= Mythos (Mario Pavone album) =

Studio album by Mario Pavone Nu Trio / Quintet
- Released: 2002
- Recorded: February 20 to November 14, 2001
- Genre: Jazz
- Length: 49:21
- Label: Playscape; PSR#J111401
- Producer: Mario Pavone

Mario Pavone chronology
Pivot (2002)	Mythos (2002)	Orange (2003)

Mythos is an album by bassist/composer Mario Pavone recorded in 2001 and released on the Playscape label.

== Reception ==
Professional ratings
Review scores
Source	Rating
Allmusic	4/5 stars
The Penguin Guide to Jazz Recordings	4/4 stars

Allmusic stated "Mythos is as powerful as its predecessor (1999's Remembering Thomas), but this time the Mario Pavone Nu Trio becomes a quintet on three tracks. The guests are trumpeter Steven Bernstein and tenor saxophonist Tony Malaby, both of whom bring a fiery irreverence to Pavone's music ... Pavone's sturdy bass playing anchors the session, leading the group through involved unison passages, consistently grooving solo statements, and inspired rubato dialogue". All About Jazz observed, "the most exciting part of Mythos is Pavone himself. You can take many approaches to listening to this record, but if you make the effort to listen to his lines, you'll hear an unswerving devotion to forward motion. Pavone can walk for years, but he has a flair for drama and angularity which he lets loose with regularity. Admittedly these pieces are in all sorts of weird time signatures, and they often shift styles midstream, but Pavone is clearly the locomotive driving this train: pure diesel power. His lines reveal the contours of the music, rendering each composition logical and coherent". In JazzTimes Harvey Siders wrote, "Pavone's writing is so harmonically daring and unpredictable that those with the technique of a Madsen or Wilson tend to bury the bass line. Imagine the texture when the horns are added. Unless Pavone is actually soloing, there are not enough opportunities to fully appreciate this late bloomer's bass playing".

== Track listing ==
All compositions by Mario Pavone except where noted.

1. "Diode" – 7:36
2. "Dialect" – 3:35
3. "Odeon" – 4:44
4. "Sky Piece" (Thomas Chapin) – 6:09
5. "Mythos" – 4:53
6. "Crutch for the Crab" (Richard Twardzik) – 4:06
7. "Dancers Tales" – 5:38
8. "Interlude" – 0:48
9. "Isobars" – 7:07
10. "Fablet" – 2:09
11. "And Then We Wrote" – 2:36

== Personnel ==
- Mario Pavone – bass
- Steven Bernstein – trumpet (tracks 1, 5 & 8)
- Tony Malaby – tenor saxophone (tracks 1, 5 & 8)
- Peter Madsen – piano
- Matt Wilson (tracks 1, 4, 5, 8 & 10), Michael Sarin (tracks 2, 3, 6, 7, 9 & 11) – drums
