= Orange (Mario Pavone album) =

Studio album by Mario Pavone Nu Trio / Quintet
- Released: October 14, 2003
- Recorded: June 18, 2003
- Studio: Systems Two, Brooklyn, NY
- Genre: Jazz
- Length: 56:03
- Label: Playscape; PSR#J061803
- Producer: Mario Pavone

Mario Pavone chronology
Mythos (2002)	Orange (2003)	Boom (2004)

Orange is an album by bassist/composer Mario Pavone recorded in 2003 and released on the Playscape label.

== Reception ==
Professional ratings
Review scores
Source	Rating
Allmusic	4.5/5 stars
The Penguin Guide to Jazz Recordings	3.5/4 stars

Allmusic stated, "Pavone's agreeable music should hold appeal for listeners of both inside and outside persuasions, from those enamored of hard bop and post-bop through to those favoring more open-ended styles of jazz exploration". In All About Jazz Jeff Stockton observed, "while these tunes keep chaos at bay with tightly composed melodies, chaos is given its due through the exciting and risky soloing of the musicians".

== Track listing ==
All compositions by Mario Pavone.

1. "Blue Rex" – 7:49
2. "Triple Diamond" – 5:13
3. "Sky Tango" – 11:22
4. "Drop Op" – 6:14
5. "Rebass Song" – 4:05
6. "Burnt Sweet Orange" – 4:52
7. "Goorootoo" – 8:53
8. "Box in Orange" – 4:51
9. "Language" – 2:44

== Personnel ==
- Mario Pavone – bass
- Steven Bernstein – trumpet, slide trumpet, arranger
- Tony Malaby – tenor saxophone
- Peter Madsen – piano
- Gerald Cleaver – drums
- Michael Musillami – arranger (track 4)
