= Deez to Blues =

Studio album by Mario Pavone Sextet
- Released: March 21, 2006
- Recorded: May 5, 2005
- Studio: Systems Two, Brooklyn, NY
- Genre: Jazz
- Length: 49:51
- Label: Playscape; PSR#050505
- Producer: Mario Pavone

Mario Pavone chronology
Boom (2004)	Deez to Blues (2006)	Trio Arc (2008)

Deez to Blues is an album by bassist/composer Mario Pavone recorded in 2005 and released on the Playscape label.

== Reception ==
Professional ratings
Review scores
Source	Rating
Allmusic	4.5/5 stars
Penguin Guide to Jazz	4/4 stars
All About Jazz	4.5/5 stars

Allmusic called it an "excellent, forward-thinking date ... Mixing orchestral flourishes with a post-bop vocabulary and a decidedly experimental sensibility, Pavone's music is both highbrow and visceral at once". The Penguin Guide to Jazz selected this album as part of its suggested Core Collection. On All About Jazz Troy Collins observed, "Pavone's swinging, multi-layered compositions push the tradition forward while always looking back" and said "Deez to Blues is a high water mark in a consistently exceptional discography". JazzTimes reviewer Brent Burton commented " Though never noisy or atonal, Blues is impossible to tune out, impossible to turn down. It demands nothing less than your undivided attention".

== Track listing ==
All compositions by Mario Pavone except where noted.

1. "Zines" – 7:44
2. "Deez" – 7:18
3. "Xapo" – 9:41
4. "Dances 3/5" – 7:20
5. "Day of the Dark Bright Light" (Marty Ehrlich) – 5:17
6. "Ocbo" – 5:12
7. "Second-Term Blues" – 7:12

== Personnel ==
- Mario Pavone – bass
- Steven Bernstein – trumpet, slide trumpet, arranger
- Howard Johnson – tuba, baritone saxophone, bass clarinet
- Charles Burnham – violin
- Peter Madsen – piano
- Michael Sarin – drums
