= Boom (Mario Pavone album) =

Studio album by Mario Pavone
- Released: 2004
- Recorded: September 10, 2003
- Genre: Jazz
- Length: 52:10
- Label: Playscape; PSR#091003
- Producer: Mario Pavone

Mario Pavone chronology
Orange (2003)	Boom (2004)	Deez to Blues (2006)

Boom is an album by bassist/composer Mario Pavone recorded in 2003 and released on the Playscape label.

== Reception ==
Professional ratings
Review scores
Source	Rating
All About Jazz	3.5/5 stars
All About Jazz	4/5 stars
The Penguin Guide to Jazz Recordings	4/4 stars

All About Jazz critic John Kelman observed, "What makes Boom remarkable and, ultimately, strangely appealing, is its combination of a freer sensibility with a rhythmic approach that usually maintains something resembling established time ... A thrilling combination of the oblique and the clearly-stated, Boom is another fine offering from Pavone, who continues to move the tradition forward with every record". On the same site Sean Patrick Fitzell said "The quartet deftly navigates Pavone's charts with tightly knit, rhythmically charged ensemble heads and spacious solo sections". In JazzTimes Ron Wynn wrote "Those expecting an exclusively outside session from Mario Pavone might be surprised by the thematic diversity on Boom ... If anything, Boom is among the most melodically delightful, musically proficient works issued on the Playscape label, and much of it wouldn't ruffle the feathers of the most rigid hard-bopper".

== Track listing ==
All compositions by Mario Pavone except where noted.

1. "Julian" - 3:40
2. "Not Five Kimono" - 5:56
3. "Arkadia" - 6:18
4. "Po" - 0:18
5. "Bad Birdie" (Thomas Chapin) - 8:43
6. "Short Yellow" - 3:23
7. "Arc" - 6:10
8. "Bastos" - 6:16
9. "Interior Boom" - 6:33
10. "Out and About" (Chapin) - 4:49

== Personnel ==
- Mario Pavone – bass
- Tony Malaby – tenor saxophone, soprano saxophone
- Peter Madsen – piano
- Matt Wilson – drums
