= Jair-Rôhm Parker Wells =

American electric bassist

Jair-Rohm Parker Wells
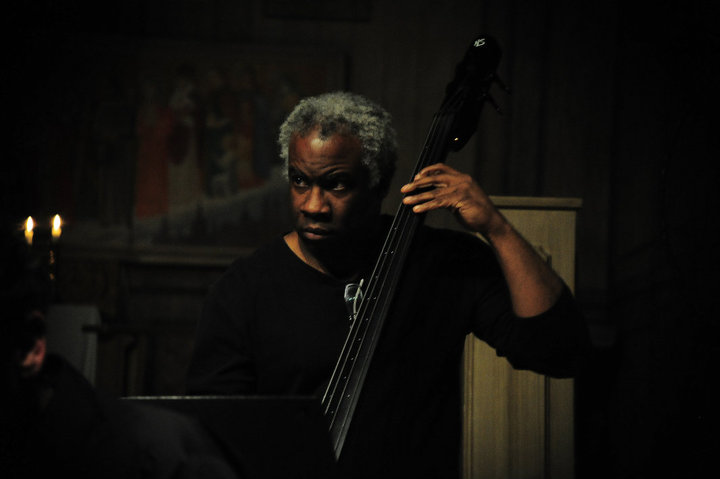
- Wells performing in 2010

Background information
- Born: October 13, 1958 (age 67)
- Origin: Tacoma, Washington
- Genres: Jazz, free jazz, free improvisation, avant-garde jazz
- Occupation: Musician
- Instruments: Bass guitar, double bass, electric upright bass
- Years active: 1974–present
- Labels: Ayler, Musso, Red Toucan
- Member of: Machine Gun
- Website: jairrohm.com

Jair-Rôhm Parker Wells (born October 13, 1958) is an American free improvising electric bassist. He is one of the founding members of the improvising band Machine Gun with Thomas Chapin and Robert Musso and the founder of the Meeting Interdisciplinary Arts Festival in Stockholm, Sweden. He lived in Stockholm, Sweden, from 1985 until 2017.

He has been a promoter of improvised and experimental music and has collaborated with Bob Belden, Karl Berger, Daniel Carter, Jaron Lanier, John Sinclair, Shabaka Hutchings, and Tony Scott. In 2017, he was in residence at EMS in Stockholm where he began work on his opera #blacbuc. The work was composed on the Buchla 100 and 200e systems at the institute. Compositions from his Liberation cycle are featured as part of res·o·nant, the light and sound installation by artist Mischa Kuball at the Jewish Museum Berlin.

Raised in southern Germany, Jair-Rohm moved to New York in 1978. After touring the United States for a year with a pop music band, he attended Tulane University in New Orleans. At Tulane he performed with local jazz and rhythm and blues musicians. He also performed as a member of Tulane University's Tulanians, met and studied with Richard Payne, and discovered the music of Harry Partch. In 1980 he returned to New York and started work-study with saxophonist Ken Simon. He met Anthony Braxton and studied his music. In 1982 he founded his experimental music theater group Glass Thought Theater Ensemble. Between 1982 and 1983 he was composer in residence at the New York Theater Ensemble, writing and producing a trilogy of progressive "operas". He received a Meet the Composer grant in 1983. During the next year, he lived in New Jersey and was a founding member of the New Brunswick Jazz Musician's Collective, for which he composed several works for ensembles. He has performed at Vahdat Hall (Tehran, Iran), Xinghai Conservatory of Music (Guangzhou, China), Tribeca Performing Arts Center (New York), Globen Arena (Stockholm), Saxophone Jazz Pub (Bangkok, Thailand), Cafe Oto (London, England) and the Domicil Jazz Club (Munich, Germany).

== Partial discography ==
- Soul Home (GTC)
- Sympathy for the Donkey with 3 Banditos (Klanggold)
- AMDG (Klanggold)
- Exquisite Noise (GTC)
- Inside of Outside with Cyndi Dawson (CD Baby)
- Steamroom Variations with Decision Dream (Red Toucan)
- Meditations on Albert Ayler with the Jair-Rohm Parker Wells Trio (Ayler)
- Machine Gun with Machine Gun (Musso)
- Active Resonance with Robert Musso (Musso)
- Open Fire with Machine Gun (Musso)
- Pass the Ammo with Machine Gun (Musso)
- Personal Nuclear Device with Reeves Gabrels, Bil Bryant, and Lance Carter (musician) as Doom Dogs (Musso)
- The Prostitution of Meritocracy (ZH27)
- Brotherly Love in Philadelphia with the Jair-Rohm Parker Wells Trio (Ayler)
- Tonal Vortex (Ephem Aural)
- Neural Resonance: Tales From The Omnisphere (Ephem Aural)

== External links and references ==
- Official website: Bass | Jair-Rohm Parker Wells
- Decision Dream Steamroom Variations
- "Take Five With Jair-Rohm Parker Wells"

Specific
