= You Don't Know Me (Thomas Chapin album) =

Studio album by Thomas Chapin
- Released: 1995
- Recorded: August 23–24, 1994
- Studio: RPM Sounds Studios, New York City
- Genre: Jazz
- Length: 62:37
- Label: Arabesque; AJ-115
- Producer: Thomas Chapin, Daniel Chriss

Thomas Chapin chronology
Menagerie Dreams (1994)	You Don't Know Me (1995)	Ride: North Sea Jazz Festival 1995 (2006)

You Don't Know Me is an album by saxophonist Thomas Chapin which was recorded in 1994 and released on the Arabesque label the following year.

== Reception ==
Professional ratings
Review scores
Source	Rating
AllMusic	4/5 stars

The AllMusic review by Scott Yanow said "Throughout this well-rounded CD, Thomas Chapin (who switches between alto, soprano and flute) is in superb form ... the album is recommended primarily for the exuberant and consistently creative playing of Chapin, a rapidly emerging talent who deserves much more recognition".

== Track listing ==
All compositions by Thomas Chapin except where noted

1. "Safari Notebook: Izzit?" – 9:29
2. "Safari Notebook: Kaokoland" – 6:06
3. "Safari Notebook: Kunene" – 7:20
4. "Safari Notebook: Opuwo" – 9:46
5. "Safari Notebook: Namibian Sunset" – 8:28
6. "Kura Kura" – 5:36
7. "Goodbye" (Gordon Jenkins) – 8:19
8. "You Don't Know Me" (Cindy Walker, Eddy Arnold) – 7:01

== Personnel ==
- Thomas Chapin – alto saxophone, mezzo-soprano saxophone, flute
- Tom Harrell – trumpet, flugelhorn
- Peter Madsen – piano
- Kiyoto Fujiwara – double bass
- Reggie Nicholson – drums
