= Ancestors (Mario Pavone album) =

Studio album by Mario Pavone Double Tenor Quintet
- Released: 2008
- Recorded: January 15, 2008
- Studio: Systems Two, Brooklyn, NY
- Genre: Jazz
- Label: Playscape; PSR#011508
- Producer: Mario Pavone

Mario Pavone chronology
Trio Arc (2008)	Ancestors (2008)	Arc Suite T/Pi T/Po (2010)

Ancestors is an album by bassist/composer Mario Pavone recorded in 2008 and released on the Playscape label.

== Reception ==
Professional ratings
Review scores
Source	Rating
Allmusic	4.5/5 stars
All About Jazz	4/5 stars
All About Jazz	4.5/5 stars
All About Jazz	4.5/5 stars

Most critics acclaimed the album. Allmusic stated "Bassist Mario Pavone just keeps on keeping on with yet another fine recording in his expanding and substantive discography ... While Pavone's recordings are generally reliable and pointedly original, this effort is close to his very best, and deserves consideration for best jazz CD of 2008". On All About Jazz Marc Corroto said "It might be cliche to say that the recording Ancestors by Mario Pavone's Double Tenor Quintet has caught lightning in a bottle, but this is indeed a potent feat of extraordinary music making ... Pavone's energy and pace may be challenging, but trying to keep up is a thing of beauty". On the same site Troy Collins called it "one of Pavone's most uncompromising and passionate recordings. For those inclined towards more adventurous fare, this is essential listening" and Nic Jones observed The very idea of a two–tenor front line is potentially fraught with complication but Pavone has been scrupulous with regards to who occupies the roles. There's enough contrast in the respective approaches of Jimmy Greene and Tony Malaby to ensure that the feeling of sameness doesn't set in. Malaby's work is the more fractious of the two whilst Greene, working a freer seam than the one he might be more readily associated with, brings to his work a kind of agitated grace which is symptomatic of a multi-faceted musician who's really coming into his own" For JazzTimes, Chris Kelsey wrote "Mario Pavone is a splendid composer and bandleader, as well. His group plays a highly evolved postbop, his compositions (arranged by Steven Bernstein, Dave Ballou and Michael Musillami) combining odd-time vamps, intricate melodies and knotty chord progressions with an open-ended modality that provides the soloists maximum freedom ... The band does a terrific job of interpreting Pavone’s highly complex tunes. This is sophisticated, exciting musi".

== Track listing ==
All compositions by Mario Pavone.

1. "Ancestors" – 9:27
2. "Strata Blue" – 5:50
3. "Tomes" – 6:00
4. "Iskmix" – 7:08
5. "Arc for Puppy" – 7:56
6. "Beige Structure" – 1:20
7. "Pachuca" – 5:32
8. "Andrew" – 7:55

== Personnel ==
- Mario Pavone – bass, arranger
- Jimmy Greene – tenor saxophone, soprano saxophone
- Tony Malaby – tenor saxophone, soprano saxophone
- Peter Madsen – piano
- Gerald Cleaver – drums
