= Mario Pavone =

American jazz musician (1940–2021)

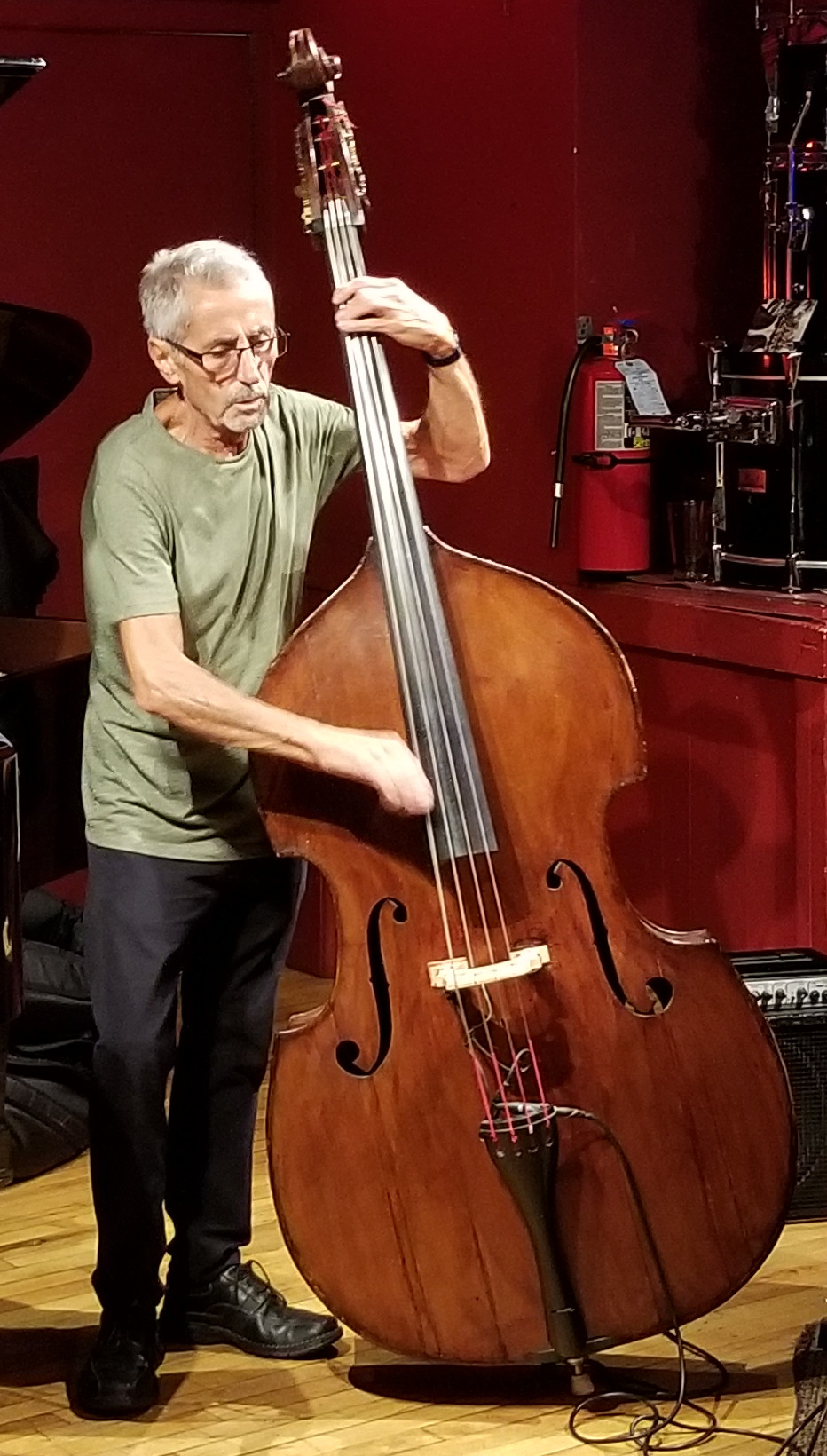
- Mario Pavone performing at the Lily Pad, Inman Square, Cambridge Mass. May 12, 2018

Background information
- Born: November 11, 1940; Waterbury, Connecticut
- Died: May 15, 2021 (aged 80) Madeira Beach, Florida
- Genres: Jazz
- Occupation: Musician
- Instrument: Double bass
- Years active: 1960s–2021
- Label: Knitting Factory
- Website: mariopavone.com

Mario Pavone (November 11, 1940 – May 15, 2021) was an American jazz bassist, composer and bandleader. Jazz critic Kevin Whitehead offers that Pavone was not only "great bass player [but also a] big-hearted mensch."

== Early life ==
Pavone was born in Waterbury, Connecticut. Pavone attended B. W. Tinker grammar school, Leavenworth High School, and the University of Connecticut at Storrs, where he graduated with a B.S. in engineering. When his Town Plot neighbor, world-renowned guitarist Joe Diorio, recognized him as an unrealized musician Mario was inspired to take up the bass. Primarily self-taught, he was a natural on his instrument. Pavone began playing bass soon after witnessing John Coltrane at the Village Vanguard in 1961.

== Career ==
Pavone's career took off in the 1960s when he toured Europe. In the 1960s he was also involved in the jazz loft era, playing in jam sessions nightly in New York City.

He began performing in 1965. The New Haven-based Creative Musicians Improvising Forum (CMIF) was founded in 1975 by Pavone, Wadada Leo Smith, and Gerry Hemingway, influenced by Chicago's Association for the Advancement of Creative Musicians. His venture into composition began here. He was a member of Paul Bley's trio during 1968–72 and Bill Dixon's trio during the 1980s. He also performed with Barry Altschul, Smith, and Hemingway.

In 1979 Pavone recorded his first album as a leader. He co-led a group with Anthony Braxton in the early 1990s, with Braxton on piano rather than his usual saxophones. In 1980 he began an 18-year musical relationship with saxophonist Thomas Chapin. With drummer Michael Sarin, the group recorded seven albums for Knitting Factory Records, which also released an eight-CD box set of these albums plus a live recording following Chapin's death in 1998.

His groups have included Matt Wilson, Gerald Cleaver, Peter Madsen, Joshua Redman, Tony Malaby, Dave Douglas, Steven Bernstein, George Schuller, Craig Taborn, and Jimmy Greene. Over 40 recordings and several films document his compositions and performances.

== Death ==
Pavone died from carcinoid cancer in Madeira Beach, Florida, on May 15, 2021, aged 80.

== Awards and honors ==
- Doris Duke Foundation composer’s grant (2010)

== Discography ==
=== As leader ===
- Digit (Alacra, 1979)
- Shodo (Alacra, 1981)
- Sharpeville (Alacra, 1988)
- Toulon Days (New World/CounterCurrents, 1992)
- Song for (Septet) (New World/CounterCurrents, 1994)
- Dancers Tales (Knitting Factory, 1997)
- Totem Blues (Knitting Factory, 2000)
- Remembering Thomas (Knitting Factory, 1999)
- Motion Poetry (Playscape, 2000)
- OpEd (Playscape, 2001)
- Mythos (Playscape, 2002)
- Orange (Playscape, 2003)
- Boom (Playscape, 2004)
- Deez to Blues (Playscape, 2006)
- Ancestors (Playscape, 2008)
- Trio Arc (Playscape, 2008)
- Arc Suite T/Pi T/Po (Playscape, 2010)
- Arc Trio (Playscape, 2013)
- Street Songs (Playscape, 2014)
- Blue Dialect (Clean Feed, 2015)
- Chrome (Playscape, 2017)
- Vertical (Clean Feed, 2017)
- Philosophy (Clean Feed, 2019)
- Isabella (Clean Feed, 2021)
- Blue Vertical (Out of Your Head, 2021)

=== As sideman ===
With Anthony Braxton

- Duets (1993) (Music & Arts, 1993)
- Seven Standards 1995 (Knitting Factory, 1995)
- Six Standards (Quintet) 1996 (Splasc(H), 2004)

With Thomas Chapin

- The Bell of the Heart (Alacra, 1981)
- Third Force (Knitting Factory, 1991)
- Anima (Knitting Factory, 1992)
- Insomnia (Knitting Factory, 1993)
- Menagerie Dreams (Knitting Factory, 1995)
- Haywire (Knitting Factory, 1996)
- Sky Piece (Knitting Factory, 1997)
- Night Bird Song (Knitting Factory, 1999)
- Ride (Playscape, 2006)

With Bill Dixon

- November 1981 (Soul Note, 1982)
- Thoughts (Soul Note, 1987)
- Son of Sisyphus (Soul Note, 1990)

With others

- Paul Bley, Paul Bley Trio (Radio Canada, 1969)
- Bobby Naughton, Understanding (Otic, 1972)
- Michael Pavone, Trio (Playscape, 2001)
- Annette Peacock & Paul Bley, Dual Unity (Freedom, 1972)
- Alan Silva, Skillfullness (ESP Disk, 1969)
- Patty Waters, Live (Blank Forms 2019)
- Patty Waters, An Evening in Houston (Clean Feed, 2020)
