= Trio Arc =

Studio album by Mario Pavone with Special Guest Paul Bley & Matt Wilson
- Released: June 1, 2008
- Recorded: October 8, 2007
- Genre: Jazz
- Length: 42:10
- Label: Playscape; PSR#100807
- Producer: Mario Pavone

Mario Pavone chronology
Deez to Blues (2006)	Trio Arc (2008)	Ancestors (2008)

Trio Arc is an album by bassist Mario Pavone, pianist Paul Bley and drummer Matt Wilson recorded in 2007 and released on the Playscape label.

== Reception ==
Professional ratings
Review scores
Source	Rating
Allmusic	4.5/5 stars
All About Jazz	4.5/5 stars
All About Jazz	5/5 stars

Allmusic stated it was "A must-have for lovers of this kind of spontaneous composition; this is not so much a throwback to the '60s as a modern update, and a welcome one indeed". For All About Jazz, music critic Robert Iannapollo said, "Trio Arc is a disc of music as timeless and innovative as only a piano trio can be". On the same site Troy Collins called it "A modern classic, Trio Arc is a superlative and timeless example of free improvisations". JazzTimes reviewer Steve Greenlee wrote, "Their jazz is free but with rhythm and a sense—a hint—of swing. This feeling of tethered freedom pervades Pavone’s excellent new record, which reunites him with his old comrade Bley on their first recording together in 35 years ... It is a beautifully odd amalgam of sounds, and it leaves the listener wanting more".

== Track listing ==
All compositions by Mario Pavone, Paul Bley and Matt Wilson except where noted.

1. "Slant" - 5:34
2. "Hello Again" - 6:53
3. "Quest" - 5:26
4. "Miro" - 5:34
5. "Lazzi" - 8:11
6. "Sweet" - 7:39
7. "Solo Bley" (Paul Bley) - 2:53

== Personnel ==
- Mario Pavone – bass (tracks 1–6)
- Paul Bley – piano
- Matt Wilson – drums (tracks 1–6)
