= Arabesque Records =

American record company and label

- Founded: 1987
- Founder: Ward Botsford, Marvin Reiss
- Genre: Jazz, classical
- Country of origin: U.S.
- Location: New York City
- Official website: www.arabesquerecords.com

Arabesque Records is an American record company and label specializing in jazz and classical music.

It was founded by Ward Botsford with Caedmon Audio as a classical music label. In 1988 it was acquired by Botsford and Marvin Reiss, becoming an independent label, and in 1992 added jazz to its production, with early releases by Craig Handy and Carmen Lundy. Its catalogue grew to include Jane Ira Bloom, Bruce Brubaker, Thomas Chapin, Dave Douglas, Art Farmer, Billy Hart, Myra Melford, and Charles McPherson, and Horace Tapscott.

== Discography ==
=== Jazz ===
Catalogue No: AJO	Artist	Album
101	Craig Handy	Split Second Timing
102	Carmen Lundy	Moment to Moment
103	8 Bold Souls	Sideshow
104	Leandro Braga	E Por Que Nao? (And Why Not?)
105	Billy Hart	Amethyst
106	Ray Drummond	Excursion
107	Jane Ira Bloom	Art and Aviation
108	String Trio of New York	Intermobility
109	Craig Handy	Introducing Three for All + One
110	Thomas Chapin	I've Got Your Number
111	Ray Drummond	Continuum
112	Art Farmer & Tom Harrell	The Company I Keep
113	Charles McPherson	First Flight Out
114	8 Bold Souls	Ant Farm
115	Thomas Chapin	You Don't Know Me
116	Barry Finnerty	Straight Ahead
117	Charles McPherson	Come Play with Me
118	Art Farmer	The Meaning of Art
119	Horace Tapscott	Aiee! The Phantom
120	Jane Ira Bloom	The Nearness
121	Charles Sullivan	Kamau
122	Ray Drummond	Vignettes
123	Bert Wilson	Endless Fingers
124	Frank Foster	Leo Rising
125	Marc Cary	Listen
126	Dave Douglas	Tiny Bell Trio: Live in Europe
127	Marlon Jordan	Marlon's Mode
128	Horace Tapscott	Thoughts of Dar es Salaam
129	Billy Hart	Oceans of Time
130	Art Farmer	Silk Road
131	Ben Monder	Dust
132	Dave Douglas	Stargazer
133	Lost Tribe	Many Lifetimes
134	Charles McPherson	Manhattan Nocturne
135	Jack Wilkins	Trio Art
136	Adrienne Wilson	She's Dangerous
137	Justin Robinson	The Challenge
138	Patrick Zimmerli	Twelve Sacred Dances
139	Dave Douglas	Magic Triangle
140	Marc Cary	The Antidote
141	Ray Drummond	1-2-3-4
142	Myra Melford	Above Blue
143	Norman Hedman	One Step Closer
144	Jane Ira Bloom	The Red Quartets
145	Dave Douglas	Leap of Faith
146	Ted Nash	Rhyme & Reason
147	Myra Melford	Dance Beyond the Color
148	Ben Monder	Excavation
149	Bobby Sanabria	Live & In Clave!!
150		
151	Donny McCaslin	Seen from Above
152	Scott Colley	The Magic Line
153	Tony Malaby	Sabino
154	Myra Melford & Marty Ehrlich	Yet Can Spring
155	Jane Ira Bloom	Sometimes the Magic
156	Ted Nash	Sidewalk Meeting
157	Hilton Ruiz	Enchantment
158	Jane Ira Bloom	Chasing Paint
159	Myra Melford	Where the Two Worlds Touch
160	Donny McCaslin	The Way Through
161		
162		
163		
164	John O'Gallagher	Abacus
165		
166	Rez Abbasi	Snake Charmer
180	Steve Wiest Big Band	Excalibur
189	Steve Wiest	Out of the New

=== Classical (early issues) ===
- Schubert and Schnabel – An Historical Recording, Volume IV., Therese Behr (1987)
- Ralph Vaughan Williams - Sir Yehudi Menuhin Conducting the English Chamber Orchestra (1988)
- The Complete Chopin Piano Works – Garrick Ohlsson, piano (1989)
- Music of Alkan – Ronald Smith, piano (1985)
- The Complete Piano Variations of Johannes Brahms – Ian Hobson, piano (1994)
- George Gershwin: An American in Paris, Rhapsody in Blue, Concerto in F – London Symphony Orchestra, Mitch Miller, conductor, David Golub, piano (1992)
- Mozart: Complete Works for Four Hands – Artur Balsam & Gena Raps, piano (1995)
- Richard Strauss: Sinfonia Domestica; 4 Orchestral Songs – Wilhelm Furtwängler, Berlin Philharmonic Orchestra (1989)
- Benjamin Britten: Illuminations; Variations on a Theme of Frank Bridge; Simple Symphony - English Chamber Orchestra; Elisabeth Söderström, Soprano; Gilbert Levine, Conductor (1989)
- Dmitri Shostakovitch: Symphony No. 1; Piano Concerto; Age of Gold Suite - Cracow Philharmonic Orchestra; Garrick Ohlsson, Piano; Gilbert Levine, Conductor (1989)

=== Classical (later issues) ===
- Encore Rossini, Rockwell Blake
- Inner Cities (2003), Alvin Curran, Bruce Brubaker, piano
- Karol Szymanowski: Solo Piano Works, Emily White, piano (2009)
- Chopin: 24 Etudes, op.10 and op.25, Matthew Cameron, piano (2015)
- Schumann: Liederkreis (Kerner Lieder; Lenau Lieder and Requiem; Eichendorff Liederkreis), Sergey Schepkin with Darren Chase, baritone (2013)
- Quynh Nguyen plays Schubert, Chopin (2004)
- Matthew Cameron plays Romantic Favorites for Piano (2012)
- Forgotten Americans Z6823, includes: "A Life," Ernst Bacon, Joel Krosnick, cello and Gilbert Kalish, piano.
- La fedeltà premiata, Haydn, Z6751-3 (1999)
- Schumann: Song Cycles Op. 24, 42 & 48 – Leon Fleisher, Phyllis Bryn-Julson, John Shirly-Quirk (2009)
- Franz Schubert: String Quartets – Guarneri String Quartet, (2009)

== See also ==
List of Record Labels
