= Excursion (album) =

Studio album by Ray Drummond
- Released: 1993
- Recorded: June 22–23, 1992
- Studio: Sound on Sound, New York City
- Genre: Jazz
- Length: 64:17
- Label: Arabesque; AJ-0106
- Producer: Ray Drummond

Ray Drummond chronology
One to One 2 (1991)	Excursion (1993)	Continuum (1994)

Excursion is an album by bassist Ray Drummond which was recorded in 1992 and released on the Arabesque label the following year.

== Reception ==
Professional ratings
Review scores
Source	Rating
AllMusic	4/5 stars
The Penguin Guide to Jazz Recordings	3/4 stars

The AllMusic review by Scott Yanow called it an "excellent set" and said "This is one of Ray Drummond's finest recordings to date".

== Track listing ==
All compositions by Ray Drummond except where noted

1. "Susanita" – 8:51
2. "Penta-Major" – 4:17
3. "Prelude" – 1:41
4. "Quads" – 9:01
5. "Invitation" (Bronisław Kaper, Paul Francis Webster) – 8:35
6. "Well, You Needn't"" (Thelonious Monk) – 6:19
7. "Andei" (Hermeto Pascoal) – 5:21
8. "Blues African" – 8:06
9. "Excursion (Suite in 5 Parts): Prologue/Waterfall/Mother Africa/Danse de Joie/Epilogue" – 12:06

== Personnel ==
- Ray Drummond – double bass
- Craig Handy, Joe Lovano – saxophone, flute
- Danilo Perez – piano
- Marvin "Smitty" Smith, Mor Thiam – drums, percussion
