= Reflections in Change =

Studio album by Craig Handy
- Released: 1999
- Recorded: June 6–8 and 25, 1999
- Studio: Systems Two Studios, Brooklyn, NY
- Genre: Jazz
- Length: 52:19
- Label: Sirrocco Music; SJL 1005
- Producer: Robin Eubanks, John Priestley

Craig Handy chronology
| Introducing Three for All + One (1994) | Reflections in Change (1999) | Flow (2000) |

Reflections in Change is the third album led by saxophonist Craig Handy which was recorded in 1999 and released on the Sirrocco Music label.

== Reception ==
Professional ratings
Review scores
| Source | Rating |
|---|---|
| AllMusic | 4/5 stars |
| The Penguin Guide to Jazz Recordings | 3/4 stars |

The AllMusic review by Scott Yanow said "A fine hard bop tenor saxophonist, Craig Handy performs four of his originals, four by drummer Ali Jackson, and Charles Mingus' "Eclipse." ... The leader plays some particularly rewarding soprano and his program is well-paced with plenty of variety, swinging in a modern fashion with just enough unpredictability to keep one guessing". On All About Jazz, Robert Dugan stated "Handy is fully in charge of an excellent quartet ... the bulk of Reflections In Change showcases Handy's capacious blowing, and he sounds relaxed, unfettered and elated"

== Track listing ==
All compositions by Craig Handy except where noted

1. "Turnerland" (Ali Jackson) – 5:12
2. "Snowqualmie" (Jackson) – 6:16
3. "Waiting for Your Call" – 5:28
4. "Eclipse" (Charles Mingus) – 6:58
5. "For Kenny" (Jackson) – 6:38
6. "Unravel the Mystery" – 6:41
7. "Homage" (Jackson) – 6:23
8. "Adona's Song: Prelude" – 2:28
9. "Adona's Song" – 6:15

== Personnel ==
- Craig Handy – soprano saxophone, tenor saxophone, bass clarinet
- Geri Allen – piano
- Rodney Whitaker – double bass
- Ali Jackson – drums
- Dave Stryker – guitar (tracks 3 & 6)
- Tara Cruise – vocals (tracks 3 & 6)
- Steve Slagle – flute (tracks 4 & 9)
- Peck Almond – trumpet (tracks 4 & 9)
- Robin Eubanks – trombone (tracks 4 & 9)
- Chris Komer – French horn (tracks 4 & 9)
- Mike Simm – clarinet (tracks 4 & 9)
- Mike Rabinowitz – bassoon (tracks 4 & 9)
- Sy Johnson – arranger (tracks 4 & 9)
