= Live in Europe (Dave Douglas album) =

Live album by Dave Douglas
- Released: 1997
- Recorded: October 10–24, 1996
- Genre: Jazz
- Length: 62:56
- Label: Arabesque
- Producer: Dave Douglas

Dave Douglas chronology
Five (1996)	Live in Europe (1997)	Sanctuary (1997)

Professional ratings
Review scores
Source	Rating
Allmusic	4/5 stars
The Penguin Guide to Jazz Recordings	3.5/4 stars

Live in Europe is the sixth album by trumpeter Dave Douglas, his first live album, and the third to feature his Tiny Bell Trio. It was released on the Arabesque label in 1997 and features performances by Douglas, Brad Schoeppach and Jim Black.

== Reception ==
The Allmusic review by Scott Yanow states "The music often looks towards Eastern Europe folk melodies but maintains its ties with American jazz and is full of constant surprises. As with virtually all of Dave Douglas' projects, this CD is well worth exploring".

== Track listing ==
1. "Around the Bend" - 7:13
2. "Bardot" - 5:42
3. "Zeno" - 11:41
4. "Preprandial" - 3:41
5. "Song for My Father-in-Law/Uncle Wiggly" - 9:46
6. "Langsam" (Schumann) - 3:58
7. "Not Thinkin' Too Good" - 8:21
8. "If the Cherry Tree Still Stands" - 6:17
9. "Czardas" (traditional Hungarian) - 6:17

All compositions by Dave Douglas except as indicated

- Tracks 1,3,6 & 8 recorded at Theatre an der Molenlaan, Bussum (Holland) on October 24, 1996; Tracks 2,4 & 7 recorded at Bimhuis, Amsterdam on October 23, 1996; Track 5 recorded at Paradox, Tilburg (Holland) on October 22, 1996; Track 9 recorded at Luchtbal, Antwerp (Belgium) on October 10, 1996

== Personnel ==
- Dave Douglas: trumpet
- Brad Schoeppach: guitar
- Jim Black: drums
