= Craig Handy =

American jazz tenor saxophonist

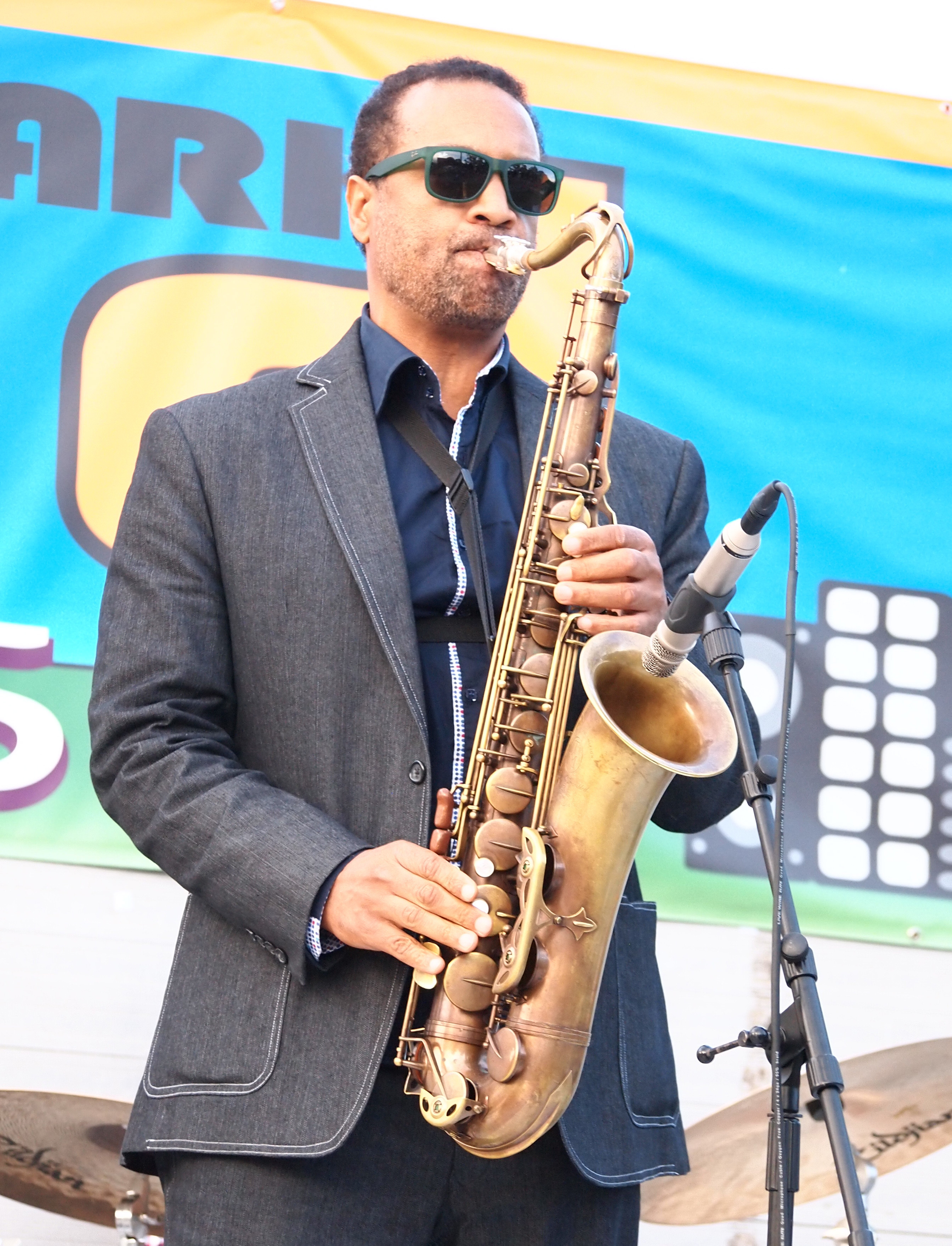
- Handy performing in 2013

Background information
- Born: Oakland, California, U.S.
- Genre: Jazz
- Occupation: Musician
- Instrument: Saxophone
- Website: www.craighandy.com

Craig Mitchell Handy (born September 25, 1962) is an American tenor saxophonist.

Born in Oakland, California, he attended North Texas State University and following this played with Herbie Hancock, Head Hunters, Art Blakey, Wynton Marsalis, Roy Haynes, Abdullah Ibrahim, Elvin Jones, Joe Henderson, Betty Carter, John Hicks, George Adams, Ray Drummond, Conrad Herwig, Dee Dee Bridgewater, The Cookers, and David Weiss among many others. He was a member and musical director of the Mingus Big Band, Mingus Dynasty, and Mingus Orchestra and performed with Charles Mingus' Epitaph reprise.

Handy plays the role of Coleman Hawkins in the 1996 film Kansas City. He is credited for performing the Cosby Show season 6 and 7 theme.

== Discography ==
=== As leader ===
Title	Year of Release	Label
Split Second Timing	1991	Arabesque
Introducing Three for All + One	1993	Arabesque
Reflections in Change	1999	Sirocco
Flow	2000	Sirocco
Craig Handy & 2nd Line Smith	2014	Okeh/Sony

=== As sideman ===
With Cecil Brooks III

- Hangin' with Smooth (Muse, 1990)

With George Cables

- The George Cables Songbook (HighNote, 2016)

With Betty Carter

- Droppin' Things (Verve, 1990)

With The Cookers

- Warriors (Jazz Legacy Productions, 2010)
- Cast the First Stone (Plus Loin, 2011)
- Believe (Motema Music, 2012)

With Ray Drummond

- Excursion (Arabesque, 1993)
- 1-2-3-4 (Arabesque, 1997 [1999])

With Joe Henderson

- Big Band (Verve, 1997)

With Freddie Hubbard

- New Colors (Hip Bop Essence, 2001)
- On the Real Side (Times Square, 2008)

With Bobby Hutcherson

- Acoustic Masters II (Atlantic, 1994)

With Abdullah Ibrahim

- Mindif (Enja, 1988)

With Charles Mingus

- Epitaph (Columbia, 1990)

With Ralph Peterson

- ALIVE At Firehouse 12 Vol. 1—The Unity Project (Onyx, 2013)

With John Scofield

- Up All Night (Verve, 2003)

With Charles Sullivan

- Kamau (Arabesque, 1995)

With Charles Tolliver

- With Love (Blue Note, 2006)

With Jack Walrath

- Journey, Man! (Evidence, 1995)
