= Steven Bernstein (musician) =

American trumpeter, arranger/composer, and bandleader

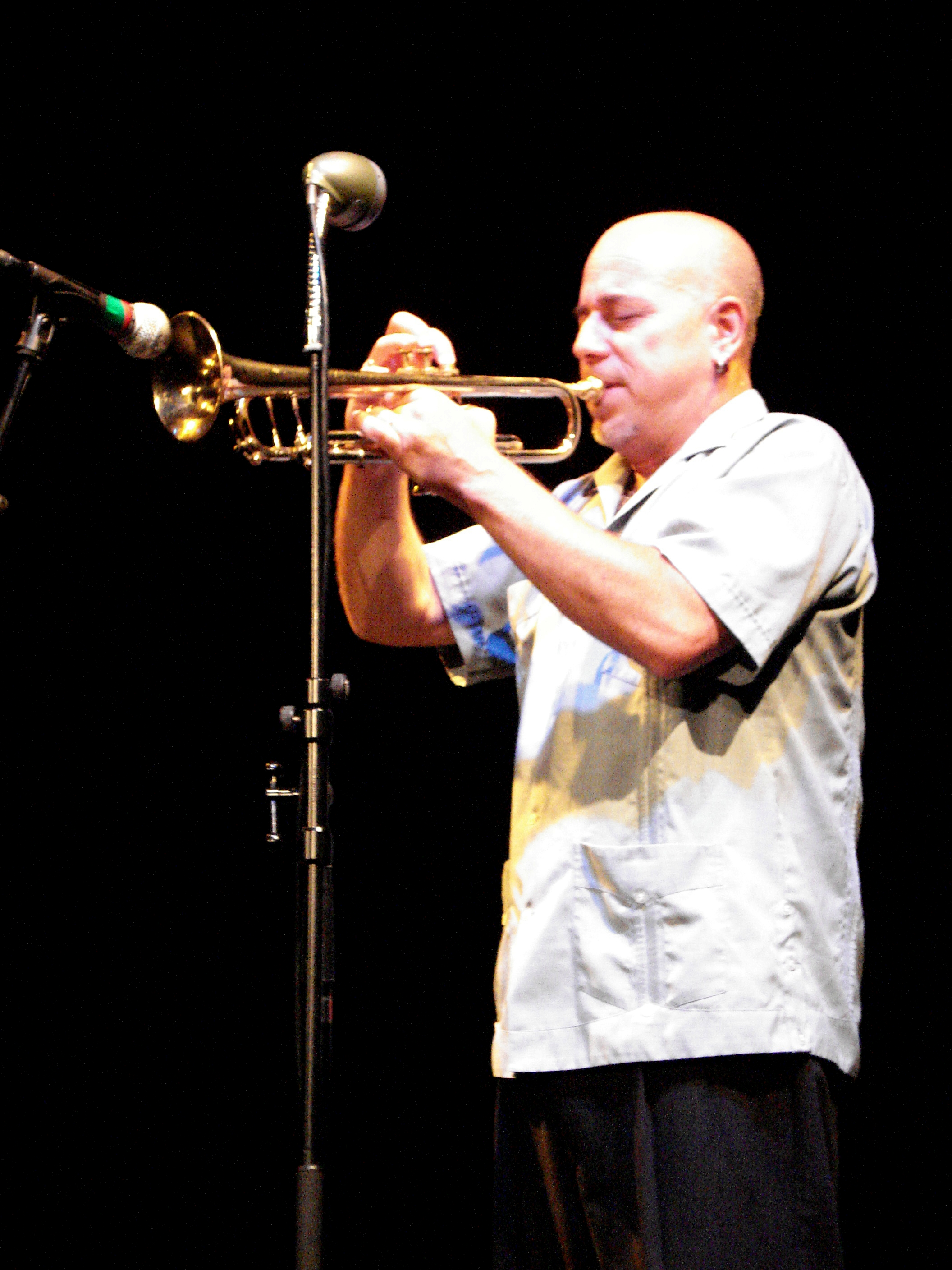
- Steven Bernstein at jazz festival in Saalfelden, 2009

Background information
- Born: October 8, 1961 (age 64); Berkeley, CA
- Genres: Jazz
- Occupation: Musician
- Instruments: Trumpet; Slide trumpet
- Labels: Tzadik, Impulse
- Website: stevenbernstein.net

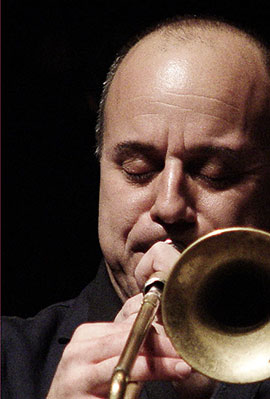
Steven Bernstein (2007)

Steven Bernstein (born October 8, 1961) is an American trumpeter, slide trumpeter, arranger/composer and bandleader based in New York City. He is best known for his work in The Lounge Lizards, Sex Mob, Spanish Fly and the Millennial Territory Orchestra. Sex Mob's 2006 CD Sexotica was nominated for a Grammy.

Bernstein has been the musical director for the Kansas City Band (from Robert Altman's film Kansas City), Jim Thirlwell's Steroid Maximus and Hal Willner's Leonard Cohen, Doc Pomus and Bill Withers projects. Bernstein has released four albums under his own name on John Zorn's Tzadik Records: Diaspora Soul, Diaspora Blues, Diaspora Hollywood and Diaspora Suite. He has performed with jazz giants including Roswell Rudd, Sam Rivers, Don Byron and Medeski, Martin & Wood, as well as musicians ranging from Aretha Franklin to Lou Reed, from Linda Ronstadt to Digable Planets, from Sting to Courtney Love. Since 2004 Bernstein has been a member of Levon Helm's Midnight Ramble band, playing in Helm's Woodstock home, as well as touring with the band. As an arranger Bernstein has written for Bill Frisell, Rufus Wainright, Marianne Faithfull and Elton John among others. He has composed for dance, theatre, film and television, and with composer John Lurie, arranged the scores to many feature films, including Get Shorty.

Bernstein is perhaps best known for playing the slide trumpet. As he indicated an interview with PostGenre, "with the slide trumpet, you have complete freedom. There’s not really anyone to compare your sound to. And that lack of comparisons gave me the freedom to not worry much about what other people did before me."

== Discography ==
=== Solo/collaborations ===
- Diaspora Soul (Tzadik, 1999)
- Diaspora Blues (Tzadik, 2002)
- Diaspora Hollywood (Tzadik, 2004)
- Diaspora Suite (Tzadik, 2008)
- Baby Loves Jazz: Go Baby Go! (Verve, 2006)
- Tattoos and Mushrooms - with Marcus Rojas and Kresten Osgood (ILK Music, 2010)
- Viper's Drag - with Henry Butler (Impulse, 2014)
- ResoNation Trio / Ultra Resonance (Royal Potato Family, 2026)

=== Sexmob (Sex Mob) ===
- Din of Inequity (Columbia/Knitting Factory, 1998)
- Solid Sender (Rex, 2000)
- Theatre & Dance (2000)
- Sex Mob Does Bond (Atlantic/Ropeadope, 2001)
- Dime Grind Palace(Ropeadope, 2003)
- Sexotica (Thirsty Ear, 2006)
- Sex Mob Meets Medeski/Live in Willisau (Thirsty Ear, 2009)
- Sexmob Plays Fellini (Royal Potato Family, 2013)
- Cultural Capital (Rex, 2017)
- The Hard Way (Corbett vs. Dempsey, 2023)

=== Steven Bernstein's Millennial Territory Orchestra ===
- MTO Volume 1 (ADA Global, 2006)
- We Are MTO (Royal Potato Family, 2008)
- MTO Plays Sly (Royal Potato Family, 2011)
- Tinctures in Time (Community Music, Vol. 1) (Royal Potato Family, 2021)
- Good Time Music (Community Music, Vol. 2) (Royal Potato Family, 2022)
- Manifesto of Henryisms (Community Music, Vol. 3) (Royal Potato Family, 2022)
- Popular Culture (Community Music, Vol. 4) (Royal Potato Family, 2022)

With John Lurie

- Live in Berlin, Vol.1, The Lounge Lizards (Intuition Music, 1991)
- Live in Berlin, Vol.2, The Lounge Lizards (Intuition Music, 1993)
- Get Shorty, Soundtrack (Verve, 1996)
- Queen of all Ears, The Lounge Lizards (Strange and Beautiful Music, 1998)
- Excess Baggage, Soundtrack (Prophesy, 1998)
- African Swim (Strange and Beautiful Music, 1999)
- Fishing with John (Strange and Beautiful Music, 1999)
- The Legendary Recordings of Marvin Pontiac (Strange and Beautiful Music, 2000)
- Music from the Series, Painting with John [Royal Potato Family, 2024)

With Nels Cline

- Lovers (Blue Note, 2016)

With Mario Pavone

- Mythos (Playscape, 2002)
- Orange (Playscape, 2003)
- Deez to Blues (Playscape, 2006)

With Michael Blake

- Kingdom of Champa, (Intuition Music, 1996)
- Drift, (Intuition Music, 2000)
- Hellbent, (P&M Records, 2007)
- Combobulate, (Newvelle Records, 2022)

== TV appearances ==
- SOLOS: the jazz sessions (Bravo! Canada - 2005)
