= Even the Sounds Shine =

Live album by Myra Melford Extended Ensemble
- Released: 1995
- Recorded: May 5 & 6, 1994
- Venue: Die Börse, Wuppertal, Germany
- Genre: Jazz
- Length: 70:38
- Label: HatART; CD 6161
- Producer: Arnd Richter, Pia Uehlinger, Werner X. Uehlinger

Myra Melford chronology
| Alive in the House of Saints (1993) | Even the Sounds Shine (1995) | The Same River, Twice (1996) |

Even the Sounds Shine is a live album by pianist Myra Melford's Extended Ensemble which was recorded in Germany in 1994 and released on the HatART label the following year.

== Reception ==
Professional ratings
Review scores
| Source | Rating |
|---|---|
| AllMusic | 4.5/5 stars |
| The Penguin Guide to Jazz Recordings | 3.5/4 stars |

The Allmusic review by Thom Jurek stated "it displays, more than any of her other recordings to date, that she's charting her own development while in transition. ... Even the Sounds Shine is a beautifully guided tour through Melford's musical psyche of the time. Possibilities and problems present themselves with startling regularity and are either resolved, transmuted, or abandoned. This is exhilarating listening, and a historical look at Melford's development as a composer as she moved from her trio setting into something more dimensional and challenging".

== Track listing ==
All compositions by Myra Melford

1. "Even the Sounds Shine" – 10:59
2. "La Mezquita Suite" – 25:12
3. "That the Peace" – 12:44
4. "Part II Frank Lloyd Wright Goes West to Rest" – 8:42
5. "Evening Might Still" – 13:00

== Personnel ==
- Myra Melford – piano
- Dave Douglas – trumpet
- Marty Ehrlich – alto saxophone, clarinet
- Lindsey Horner – double bass
- Reggie Nicholson – drums
