= Alive in the House of Saints =

Live album by Myra Melford Trio
- Released: 1993
- Recorded: February 3 & 5, 1993
- Venue: Alte Oper in Frankfurt and Der Club in Heiligenhaus, Germany
- Genre: Jazz
- Length: 74:20 Original release 113:34 Double CD with additional tracks
- Label: HatART; CD 6136
- Producer: Arnd Richter, Werner X. Uehlinger

Myra Melford chronology
Now & Now (1992)	Alive in the House of Saints (1993)	Even the Sounds Shine (1995)

Alive in the House of Saints is a live album by pianist Myra Melford's Trio which was recorded in Germany in 1993 and released on the HatART label. The album was originally released as a single CD in 1993 then as an expanded double CD in 2001 and as two separate volumes in 2017/18

== Reception ==
Professional ratings
Review scores
Source	Rating
AllMusic	4.5/5 stars
All About Jazz	4/5 stars
The Penguin Guide to Jazz Recordings	3.5/4 stars

The Allmusic review by Thom Jurek stated "This live date from 1993 from Myra Melford's piano trio is among her most remarkable recordings. ... While this live set may not be as avant-guard [sic] as her studio work, it is far more satisfying; it showcases what a fine composer and pianist Melford is, and how telepathic this trio is".

On All About Jazz, John Sharpe observed "While the trio recognizably inhabits the tradition, Melford extends and subverts the genre through her adventurous compositions in a foretaste of what was to come with her bands such as Same River Twice, Be Bread and Snowy Egret. She also distinguishes herself through a notable rhythmic impulse, blues-tinged extemporizations and the capacity to take matters outside. Horner provides a solid foundation, holding down vamps in a way that they don't overstay their welcome, and proposing a pulse-based lyricism when in the spotlight"

== Track listing ==
All compositions by Myra Melford

Part 1:

1. "Evening Might Still" – 11:16
2. "Now & Now 1" – 6:50 Additional track not on original release
3. "Between Now & Then" – 15:54 Additional track not on original release
4. "Parts I & II Frank Lloyd Wright Goes West to Rest" – 18:50

Part 2:

1. "Breaking Light" – 8:57
2. "Some Kind of Blues" – 9:40 Additional track not on original release
3. "That the Peace" – 10:44
4. "And Silence" – 12:11
5. "Now & Now 2" – 6:53 Additional track not on original release
6. "Live Jump" – 12:19

== Personnel ==
- Myra Melford – piano
- Lindsey Horner – double bass
- Reggie Nicholson – drums
