= 1-2-3-4 (Ray Drummond album) =

Studio album by Ray Drummond
- Released: February 9, 1999
- Recorded: June 9 & 10, 1997
- Studio: EastSide Sound, New York City
- Genre: Jazz
- Length: 66:29
- Label: Arabesque; AJ-0141
- Producer: Ray Drummond

Ray Drummond chronology
Vignettes (1995)	1-2-3-4 (1999)

1-2-3-4 is an album by American bassist Ray Drummond which was recorded in 1997 and released on the Arabesque label in 1999.

== Reception ==
Professional ratings
Review scores
Source	Rating
AllMusic	4/5 stars
The Penguin Guide to Jazz Recordings	4/4 stars

The AllMusic review by Michael G. Nastos said "Drummond's made yet another very fine recording -- what a great treasure jazz has in this bassist, composer, and bandleader. Easily recommended to all lovers of the modern mainstream and jazz in general". All About Jazz said "1-2-3-4 was created, performed, and recorded by a singularly intuitive group of musicians under the guidance of a legitimate mainstay in the modern jazz tradition. An in-depth critical analysis of 1-2-3-4 is unnecessary; it should simply be listened to and enjoyed".

== Track listing ==
All compositions by Ray Drummond except where noted

1. "Ana Maria" (Wayne Shorter) – 8:01
2. "Ballade Poetique" – 3:55
3. "Driftin'" – 6:37
4. "Prelude to a Kiss" (Duke Ellington, Irving Gordon, Irving Mills) – 2:31
5. "What Is Happening Here" – 8:04
6. "Little Waltz" (Ron Carter) – 3:59
7. "Goin' Home" (Traditional) – 7:57
8. "Kinda Like" – 3:46
9. "Nefertiti" (Shorter) – 6:53
10. "Mr. P.C." (John Coltrane) – 4:07
11. "Oh Jay" – 5:12
12. "Willow Weep for Me" (Ann Ronell) – 5:27

== Personnel ==
- Ray Drummond – double bass
- Craig Handy – tenor saxophone, soprano saxophone
- Stephen Scott – piano
- Billy Hart – drums
