= The Same River, Twice =

Studio album by Myra Melford
- Released: 1996
- Recorded: January 25–26, 1996
- Studio: Sorcerer Sound, NYC
- Genre: Jazz
- Length: 62:31
- Label: Gramavision; CD 6161
- Producer: Myra Melford, Dave Douglas

Myra Melford chronology
Even the Sounds Shine (1995)	The Same River, Twice (1996)	Eleven Ghosts (1997)

The Same River, Twice is an album by pianist Myra Melford which was recorded in 1996 and released on the Gramavision label.

== Reception ==
Professional ratings
Review scores
Source	Rating
AllMusic	4.5/5 stars

The Allmusic review by Stephen Cook stated "Myra Melford's studies with avant-bop pianist Don Pullen and idiosyncratic jazz composer Henry Threadgill are reflected in the seamless combination of structure and free improvisation in both her writing and piano playing. Her only release on the Gramavision label, The Same River, Twice nicely exemplifies the mix with a selection of sprawling, exploratory numbers and shorter, more straightforward pieces. ... A fine release by one of the brightest composers and players to appear on the jazz scene in the '90s".

In JazzTimes, Bill Shoemaker wrote "it was The Same River, Twice’s ’96 eponymous Gramavision disc that the trio-honed, catalytic capacity of her elegantly knotted thematic materials and wild card-like structural features was fully realized with a larger group".

== Track listing ==
All compositions by Myra Melford

1. "Bound Unbound" – 5:11
2. "Crush" – 15:36
3. "Changes I & II" – 8:33
4. "Drawing in the Dark (A Prayer for Peace in The Balkans)" – 8:32
5. "The Large Ends the Way" – 24:39

== Personnel ==
- Myra Melford – piano
- Dave Douglas – trumpet
- Chris Speed – tenor saxophone, clarinet
- Erik Friedlander – cello
- Michael Sarin – drums
