= Lindsey Horner =

American jazz double-bassist

Lindsey Horner (born October 4, 1960, New York City) is an American jazz double-bassist.

Horner studied double bass at the Juilliard School of Music as well as musicology and philosophy at Trinity College (Dublin). He also took private lessons with Milt Hinton and Dave Holland. Since 1982 he has directed his own groups; his first two CDs Never No More (1991) and Mercy Angel (1995) were rated five out of five stars by Down Beat. He also conducted the group "The Chromatic Persuaders" together with the pianist Neal Kirkwood and was a member of the trio of Myra Melford (Alive in the House of Saints, 1993) and the quartet of Matthias Schubert. In addition, he also recorded with Muhal Richard Abrams, Marty Ehrlich, Herb Robertson, Tom Varner, Bobby Previte, Peter Herborn and the New York Composer's Orchestra. He has performed with Pharoah Sanders, John Zorn, Joey Baron, Mark Feldman, Ray Anderson, and Don Byron. He also plays Irish music, with The Chieftains, the Bothy Band and Andy Irvine.

== Discography ==
- Never No More (OPEN MINDS 1991)
- Mercy Angel (Upshot Records 1994)
- Believers (Koch Jazz 1997)
- Through the Bitter Frost and Snow (with Susan McKeown) (Prime CD 1997)
- Mighty Rain with (Susan McKeown) (Depth Of Field 1998)
- Jewels & Binoculars (The Music Of Bob Dylan) (2003)
- Ships With Tattooed Sails (Upshot 2008)
- Don't Count On Glory (Cadence Jazz Records 2005)
- Undiscovered Country (ArtistShare 2010)
- One More Forever (Upshot 2017)

With Myra Melford

- Jump (Enemy, 1991)
- Now & Now (Enemy, 1992)
- Alive in the House of Saints (HatART, 1993)
- Even the Sounds Shine (Hat ART, 1995)
- The October Revolution (Evidence, 1996) featured on one track

With Joseph Jarman and Leroy Jenkins

- Out of the Mist (Ocean, 1997)
