= Eleven Ghosts =

Studio album by Myra Melford and Han Bennink
- Released: 1997
- Recorded: February 11–12, 1994
- Venue: Radio DRS, Zürich, Switzerland
- Genre: Jazz
- Length: 48:42
- Label: HatOLOGY; 507
- Producer: Pia Uehlinger, Werner X. Uehlinger

Myra Melford chronology
The Same River, Twice (1996)	Eleven Ghosts (1997)	Above Blue (1999)

Han Bennink chronology
Home Safely (1994)	Eleven Ghosts (1997)	Azurety (1994)

Eleven Ghosts is an album of duets by pianist Myra Melford and drummer/percussionist Han Bennink which was recorded in Switzerland in 1994 and released on the HatOLOGY label in 1997.

== Reception ==
Professional ratings
Review scores
Source	Rating
AllMusic	4/5 stars

The Allmusic review by Joslyn Layne stated "Supreme musicians Myra Melford and Han Bennink join together for a duo recording as blues progressions, boogie-woogie, and Harlem stride become the trampoline from which they jump. It's free, free, but far less cryptic -- and more accessible -- than one might expect. ... Eleven Ghosts won't scare the audience off. Even people who stiffen at the words "outside jazz" will relax their shoulders while listening to this album".

In JazzTimes, Bill Shoemaker wrote "On Eleven Ghosts, pianist Myra Melford and percussionist Han Bennink bring complementary assets to a free-ranging duo program. Melford’s affinity for the blues and her compositional skills give the album a subtle structural underpinning. Bennink continually pushes the music to the brink with his patented combination of cyclonic energy and loony humor".

== Track listing ==
All compositions by Myra Melford except where noted

1. "The First Mess" (Han Bennink, Myra Melford) – 2:33
2. "How Long Blues" (Leroy Carr) – 5:31
3. "Frank Goes To" – 7:23
4. "Another Mess" (Han Bennink) – 4:48
5. "Which Way Is That?" – 9:24
6. "Three Ghosts" (Bennink, Melford) – 5:11
7. "Some Relief" (composer unknown) – 1:12
8. "And Now Some Blues" – 4:43
9. "Now" – 2:05
10. "And Now" – 2:51
11. "The Maple Leaf Rag" (Scott Joplin) – 3:01

== Personnel ==
- Myra Melford – piano
- Han Bennink – drums
