= Introducing Three for All + One =

Studio album by Craig Handy
- Released: 1993
- Recorded: April 12–13, 1993
- Studio: RPM Sound Studios, New York City
- Genre: Jazz
- Length: 52:25
- Label: Arabesque; AJ-0109
- Producer: Craig Handy

Craig Handy chronology
Split Second Timing (1992)	Introducing Three for All + One (1993)	Reflections in Change (1999)

Introducing Three for All + One is the second album led by saxophonist Craig Handy which was recorded in 1993 and released on the Arabesque label.

== Reception ==
Professional ratings
Review scores
Source	Rating
AllMusic	4.5/5 stars
The Penguin Guide to Jazz Recordings	3/4 stars

The AllMusic review by Scott Yanow said "The improvisations are explorative yet melodic and logical, while the interplay between these talented players is consistently impressive. Together they explore tributes to Clifford Jordan and George Adams and at times hint at Coltrane, Sonny Rollins, and even Grover Washington, Jr.. ... recommended". On All About Jazz, Robert Dugan called it "another forward-looking set of music".

== Track listing ==
All compositions by Craig Handy except where noted

1. "Spinning Wheel" (David Clayton-Thomas) – 4:18
2. "Isotope" (Joe Henderson) – 5:25
3. "Bright Eyes" (Charles Fambrough) – 5:08
4. "E Racer X" (Ralph Peterson) – 5:02
5. "Chant" (Dave Kikoski) – 5:51
6. "P.S. I Love You" (Gordon Jenkins, Johnny Mercer) – 3:32
7. "Esnadtriuqs!" – 2:21
8. "One!" (Marvin Hamlisch. Edward Kleban) – 5:50
9. "Amy's Waltz" (Fambrough) – 3:50
10. "The Avenue" (Fambrough) – 4:54
11. "To Woo It May Concern" – 3:23
12. "West Bank: Beyond the Berlin Wall" – 3:01

== Personnel ==
- Craig Handy – tenor saxophone
- David Kikoski – piano (tracks 3, 5, 9 & 10)
- Charles Fambrough – double bass
- Ralph Peterson – drums
