= Split Second Timing =

Studio album by Craig Handy
- Released: 1992
- Recorded: June 18–19, 1991
- Studio: Clinton Recording Studios, Inc., New York City
- Genre: Jazz
- Length: 66:51
- Label: Arabesque; AJ-0101
- Producer: Craig Handy

Craig Handy chronology
| Split Second Timing (1992) | Introducing Three for All + One (1994) |

Split Second Timing is the debut album led by saxophonist Craig Handy which was recorded in 1991 and became the first release on the Arabesque label the following year.

== Reception ==
Professional ratings
Review scores
| Source | Rating |
|---|---|
| AllMusic | 4/5 stars |

The AllMusic review by Scott Yanow said "Tenor saxophonist Craig Handy's debut as a leader is an impressive effort. The advanced hard bop music has fine arrangements by Handy, who also contributed five of the nine pieces. At this point, Craig Handy's sound was almost distinctive, and he clearly had a great future. Recommended". On All About Jazz, Robert Dugan stated "it is one of those debuts that causes jazz fans to salivate. Here was a charging, explosive, up to the minute group that didn't seem content to simply rehash the past. Bringing forward the mainstream with a tough, two-feet on the ground approach, Split-Second Timing served in part as an antidote to much of the conventionalism of the '80s—where, for some, it seemed as if musicians were stuck in a time warp with too much rehashing of the Miles Davis/Wayne Shorter band of the '60s."

== Track listing ==
All compositions by Craig Handy except where noted

1. "The Immediacy of Hardcore" – 6:41
2. "Slippin 'n' Sliding" – 6:44
3. "You're Blasé" (Ord Hamilton, Bruce Sievier) – 9:18
4. "Voyage" (Kenny Barron) – 7:20
5. "In a Sentimental Mood" (Duke Ellington, Manny Kurtz, Irving Mills) – 4:57
6. "Split Second Timing" – 7:36
7. "Jogral" (Djavan) – 5:37
8. "Tori" – 10:22
9. "Ms. Thang" – 8:00

== Personnel ==
- Craig Handy – alto saxophone, tenor saxophone
- Robin Eubanks – trombone
- Edward Simon – piano, bongos
- Ray Drummond – double bass
- Ralph Peterson Jr. – drums
