= Five (Dave Douglas album) =

Studio album by Dave Douglas
- Released: 1996
- Recorded: July 31–August 1, 1995
- Genre: Jazz
- Length: 59:42
- Label: Soul Note
- Producer: Dave Douglas

Dave Douglas chronology
Constellations (1995)	Five (1996)	Live in Europe (1997)

Professional ratings
Review scores
Source	Rating
Allmusic	4/5 stars
The Penguin Guide to Jazz Recordings	4/4 stars

Five is the fifth album by trumpeter Dave Douglas and the second to feature his string group following Parallel Worlds (1993). It was released on the Italian Soul Note label in 1996 and features performances by Douglas, Mark Feldman, Erik Friedlander, Drew Gress and Michael Sarin.

== Reception ==
The Allmusic review by Scott Yanow states "Trumpeter Dave Douglas' unusual string group is reminiscent in some ways of Ornette Coleman's free-jazz quartet despite not playing any of Ornette's originals and having a very different instrumentation. All of the musicians function as equals, the interaction is often intuitive, and the improvising... is on a high level. Well worth exploring".

== Track listing ==
1. "Invasive Procedure" - 0:41
2. "Mirrors (for Steve Lacy)" - 2:56
3. "Going, Going (for Wayne Shorter)" - 5:40
4. "Seven (for Mark Dresser)" - 8:54
5. "Who Knows" (Monk) - 4:35
6. "The Inflated Tear" (Kirk) - 6:16
7. "Actualities (for Woody Shaw)" - 13:31
8. "Knit Brow" - 0:55
9. "Over Farrell's (for John Cage)" - 8:04
10. "Mogador (for John Zorn)" - 8:10

All compositions by Dave Douglas except as indicated

  - Recorded at East Side Sound, New York City on July 31 and August 1, 1995

== Personnel ==
- Dave Douglas: trumpet
- Mark Feldman: violin
- Erik Friedlander: cello
- Drew Gress: bass
- Michael Sarin: drums
