= I've Got Your Number (album) =

Studio album by Thomas Chapin
- Released: 1993
- Recorded: January 11, 1993
- Studio: Skyline Studios, New York City
- Genre: Jazz
- Length: 56:09
- Label: Arabesque; AJ-110
- Producer: Marty Ehrlich

Thomas Chapin chronology
Insomnia (1993)	I've Got Your Number (1993)	Menagerie Dreams (1994)

I've Got Your Number is an album by saxophonist Thomas Chapin which was recorded in 1993 and released on the Arabesque label.

== Reception ==
Professional ratings
Review scores
Source	Rating
AllMusic	4/5 stars

The AllMusic review by Scott Yanow said "Although this is essentially a modern bop session, it is obvious that altoist Thomas Chapin was open to more explorative music. ... The overall results are quite pleasing and often exciting within the modern mainstream of jazz".

== Track listing ==
All compositions by Thomas Chapin except where noted

1. "I've Got Your Number" (Cy Coleman, Carolyn Leigh) – 5:44
2. "Drinkin'" – 7:38
3. "Time Waits" (Bud Powell) – 7:30
4. "Moon Ray" (Artie Shaw, Arthur Quenzer, Paul Madison) – 7:43
5. "Don't Look Now" – 6:03
6. "The Present" – 6:55
7. "The Walking Wounded" – 8:42
8. "Rhino!" – 5:54

== Personnel ==
- Thomas Chapin – alto saxophone, flute
- Ronnie Mathews – piano
- Ray Drummond – double bass
- Steve Johns – drums
- Louis Bauzo – congas (tracks 5 & 7)
