= Machine Gun (band) =

- Origin: New York City, New York
- Genres: Jazz, avant-garde jazz
- Years active: 1986–present
- Labels: MuWorks
- Members: Robert Musso; Bil Bryant; John Lunar Richey; Jair-Rohm Parker Wells
- Past members: Thomas Chapin; Lance Carter; Elliott Levin; Karl Berger; Sonny Sharrock

Machine Gun is an improvising band formed in New York City in 1986. Its members were Robert Musso: guitars, Thomas Chapin: reeds and flute, John Lunar Richey: vocals, cut-ups, tapes, TV, Bil Bryant: drums, Jair-Rohm Parker Wells: basses. Karl Berger played melodica on their first album. Guitarist Sonny Sharrock frequently performed with the band and appeared on their first two albums. The band's name came from Peter Brötzmann's 1968 album Machine Gun. N. Scott Robinson played drums with them on one occasion.

== Members ==
- Thomas Chapin – flute, saxophone
- Karl Berger – vocals, melodica
- Sonny Sharrock – guitar
- Robert Musso – guitar, tapes
- Jair-Rohm Parker Wells – bass guitar
- Billy Bryant – drums
- John Lunar Richey – vocals, tapes
