= Continuum (Ray Drummond album) =

Studio album by Ray Drummond
- Released: 1994
- Recorded: January 16, 1994
- Studio: Sound On Sound, New York City
- Genre: Jazz
- Length: 66:40
- Label: Arabesque; AJ-0111
- Producer: Ray Drummond

Ray Drummond chronology
Excursion (1993)	Continuum (1994)	Vignettes (1995)

Continuum is an album by bassist Ray Drummond which was recorded in 1994 and released on the Arabesque label.

== Reception ==
Professional ratings
Review scores
Source	Rating
AllMusic	4.5/5 stars
The Penguin Guide to Jazz Recordings	3.5/4 stars

The AllMusic review by Scott Yanow said "Alternating some blues-oriented numbers with more complex pieces, Drummond put together a varied program that brings out the best in his illustrious sidemen".

== Track listing ==
All compositions by Ray Drummond except where noted

1. "A Blues from the Sketchpad" – 7:25
2. "Equipoise" (Stanley Cowell) – 6:51
3. "The Intimacy of the Blues" (Billy Strayhorn) – 5:00
4. "Gloria's Step" (Scott LaFaro) – 11:51
5. "Some Serious Steppin'" – 8:23
6. "Sakura" (Traditional) – 5:42
7. "Sail Away" (Tom Harrell) – 7:55
8. "Blues in the Closet" (Oscar Pettiford) – 7:04
9. "Sophisticated Lady" (Duke Ellington, Mitchell Parish, Irving Mills) – 6:29

== Personnel ==
- Ray Drummond – double bass
- John Scofield – guitar
- Randy Brecker – trumpet
- Kenny Barron – piano
- Marvin "Smitty" Smith – drums, percussion
- Thomas Chapin – flute, alto flute, bass flute
- Steve Nelson – vibraphone
- Mor Thiam – percussion
