= Myra Melford =

American jazz pianist and composer (born 1957)

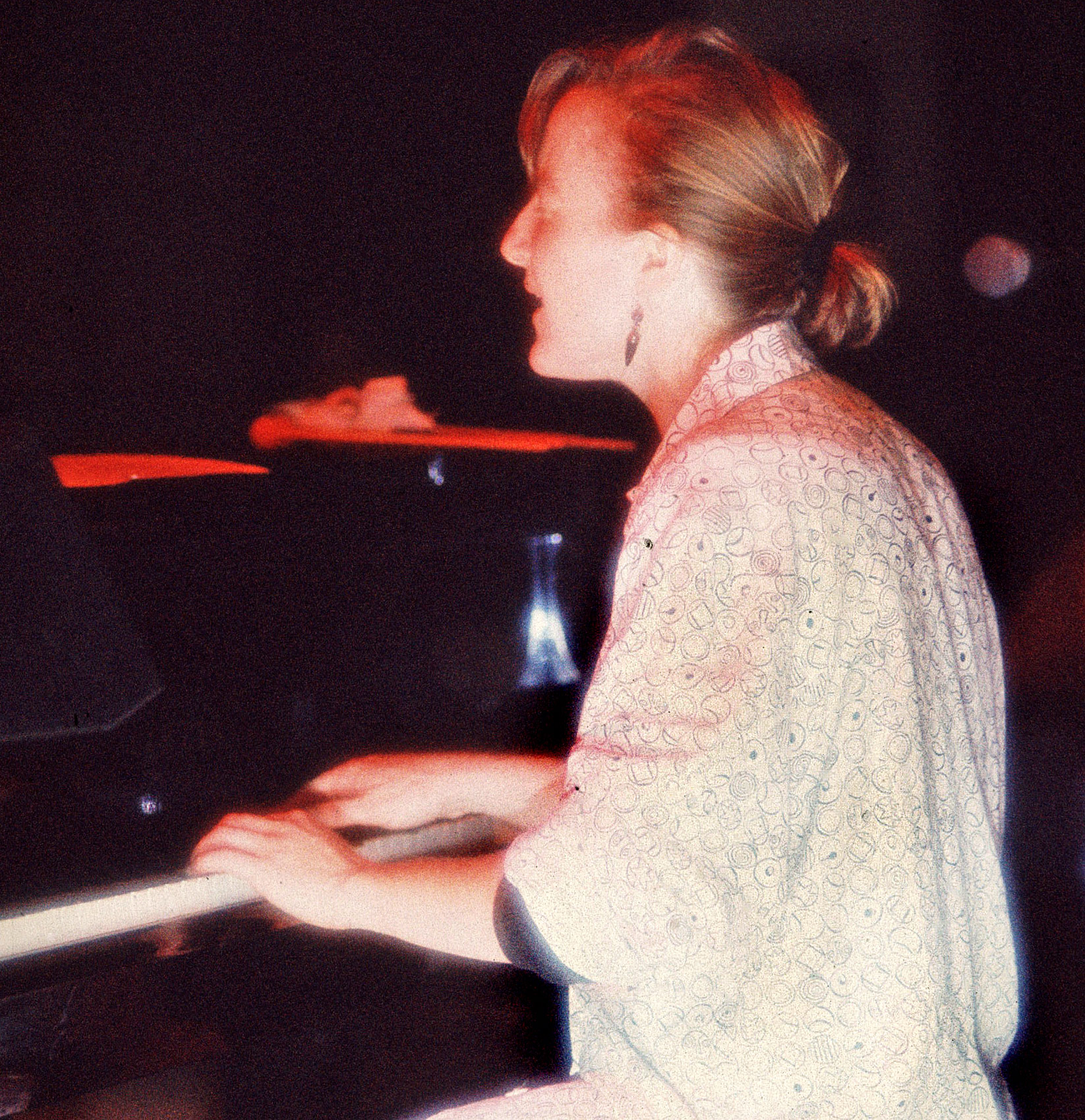
- Myra Melford in Helsinki in 1993. Photo by Michael Wilson

Background information
- Born: January 5, 1957 (age 69); Evanston, Illinois, U.S.
- Genres: Jazz, avant-garde jazz
- Occupations: Musician, composer
- Instrument: Piano
- Years active: 1980s–present
- Labels: Arabesque, Enemy, Gramavision, Hatology, Cryptogramophone, Firehouse 12, Enja/Yellowbird
- Website: www.myramelford.com

Myra Melford (born January 5, 1957) is an American avant-garde jazz pianist and composer. A 2013 Guggenheim Fellow, Melford was described by the San Francisco Chronicle as an "explosive player, a virtuoso who shocks and soothes, and who can make the piano stand up and do things it doesn't seem to have been designed for."

== Early life and education ==
Melford was born in Evanston, Illinois and was raised in a house designed by Frank Lloyd Wright. At 3, she started playing the piano on her own, climbing onto the piano bench and improvising. She began taking lessons when she was in kindergarten. She developed a strong relationship with her teacher, Erwin Helfer, a classically trained boogie-woogie player. Helfer introduced her to classical composers such as Bach before moving on to contemporary composers, such as Bartók, and later taught her to play the blues. Melford attended blues festivals, and because of her relationship with Helfer, she was often invited backstage, where she encountered many of Chicago's most acclaimed performers. Independently, Melford also began to explore improvisation.

Pushed towards performing classical repertoire, Melford attended a Northwestern University extension program in junior high school. She described her experience as a classical piano student as "not right," and while she continued to play informally, she stopped her formal studies in high school.

Melford enrolled at Evergreen State College in Olympia, Washington, where she intended to study environmental science. Although she was not then listening to jazz, and had not grown up listening to it, she knew that it involved improvisation, and when she saw an advertisement for jazz piano lessons in a local restaurant, she began studying again. She recalled that, during the next few years, "There were two records... which were on constant repeat: Cecil Taylor's Air Above Mountains and Ornette Coleman's The Shape of Jazz to Come." Shortly thereafter, she switched her major to music, and in 1980 attended Cornish College of the Arts and studied with Art Lande and Gary Peacock.

The flow I experience, when I'm following or allowing my natural impulse to guide the music, is really a kind of meta-flow. A state where I don't have to think about what to play, but rather I know what note, what gesture, what shape or rhythm comes next, and it's almost as if it happens without my doing anything. It's a visceral response through movement and sound to what I'm hearing.

While living in Olympia, Melford met prominent avant-garde musicians including Oliver Lake, Anthony Braxton, Marty Ehrlich and Leroy Jenkins, whose performance with Amina Claudine Myers and Pheeroan akLaff inspired an "ecstatic feeling" which intensified her commitment to improvisation.

== Career ==
Melford moved to New York City in 1984, where she studied composition with saxophonist Henry Threadgill, whom she would later cite as a major influence on her perception of organic composition. She also studied privately with pianists Jaki Byard and Don Pullen, whose percussive mannerisms she adapted.

After arriving in New York, Melford performed in the bands of Threadgill, Leroy Jenkins, and Butch Morris, among others. In the late 1980s she played and recorded with flutist Marion Brandis, and formed a trio with bassist Lindsey Horner and drummer Reggie Nicholson. Her career accelerated in the early 1990s, as she participated in the first Knitting Factory tour of Europe, and recorded three albums with Horner and Nicholson: Jump (1990), Now & Now (1991), and Alive in the House of Saints, a live album, in 1993.

Later in the 1990s, Melford moved toward larger groupings with diverse instrumentation, and added trumpeter Dave Douglas and reed player Marty Ehrlich to her trio lineup to create a quintet, the Myra Melford Extended Ensemble. She also formed a second five-piece, the Same River, Twice, featuring Douglas, cellist Erik Friedlander, reed player Chris Speed, and drummer Michael Sarin. Their self-titled debut album was released on Gramavision in 1996, followed by 1999's Above Blue on Arabesque. Melford also appeared as an improvisational collaborator on the 1996 Hatology release Eleven Ghosts, featuring duets performed with Dutch drummer Han Bennink; and Equal Interest, a 1999 Omnitone release by the trio of the same name, featuring Melford with Jenkins and Joseph Jarman of the Art Ensemble of Chicago. With Equal Interest, Melford performed on harmonium as well as piano. By the close of the decade, Melford had become one of the downtown jazz scene's most celebrated performers and composers, with the Seattle Times describing her in 1999 as an "explosive pianist who alternately caresses and pounds the keyboard and weaves brilliant swatches of composed material into free-form improvisation."

In 2000, Melford formed Crush, a trio in which she played piano and harmonium with Kenny Wollesen on drums and Stomu Takeishi on electric bass. Arabesque released the trio's Dance Beyond the Color later that year. In September, she traveled to Calcutta to study harmonium with Sohanlal Sharma as a Fulbright scholar. She spent several months with Sharma, focusing on raga and Hindustani classical music, and continued her studies with other musicians in Delhi and Rajistan. She additionally studied with Sudhir Nayak in Mumbai.

After returning to the United States, Melford lived at an upstate New York ashram. She subsequently formed an ensemble expressly to play music based on her studies in India, Myra Melford's Be Bread. Although it remained unreleased until 2006, Be Bread's debut album, The Image of Your Body (whose title was derived from a Rumi poem), was recorded in 2003, as was Where the Two Worlds Touch by Myra Melford's The Tent, released by Arabesque.

Melford relocated to Berkeley, California in 2004 to accept a position as Professor of contemporary improvisational music, University of California Berkeley. In 2006, along with bassist Mark Dresser and drummer Matt Wilson, Melford formed Trio M, who released their debut album, The Big Picture, on Cryptogramophone in 2007. It was followed by The Guest House on Enja/Yellowbird in 2012.

Melford performs with clarinetist/composer Ben Goldberg, who she met just after she moved to Berkeley, in the duo Dialogue. Melford formed a new quintet, Snowy Egret, featuring bassist Takeishi, guitarist Liberty Ellman, trumpeter Ron Miles, and drummer Tyshawn Sorey in 2012. In October, Melford won the 2012 Alpert Award for "her ascending and expansive trajectory, great, generous musical mind and her ability to take multiple musical traditions into another sphere."

Melford released her first solo album in October 2013. Titled Life Carries Me This Way, the album is a collection of work inspired by the paintings of the late visual artist Don Reich. That same year, she was named a Guggenheim Fellow and received both the Doris Duke Charitable Foundation's Performing Artist Award and a Doris Duke Residency to Build Demand for the Arts for her efforts to re-imagine the jazz program at San Francisco's Yerba Buena Center for the Arts; in November, Snowy Egret performed the music for Melford's multimedia project Language of Dreams, at the center.

At Berkeley, Melford has developed and taught a series of courses in contemporary jazz and improvisation-based music for performers and composers in addition to lecturing on innovations in jazz since the 1960s and other topics in contemporary improvised music.

== Selected honors, fellowships, and awards ==
- Guggenheim Fellowship (2013)
- Doris Duke Charitable Foundation's Performing Artist Award (2013)
- Alpert Award in the Arts for Music (2012)
- Jazz Journalists Association Pianist of the Year (2008, 2009)
- Jazz Journalists Association Composer of the Year (2004)
- Fulbright scholar (2000)
- New York Foundation for the Arts Composition Fellowship (1998, 2002, 2008)
- Chamber Music America New Jazz Works Commissioning grant (2003)

== Discography ==
=== As leader/co-leader ===
An asterisk indicates that the year is that of release.

| Year recorded | Title | Label | Notes |
|---|---|---|---|
| 1990 | Jump | Enemy | Trio, with Lindsey Horner (bass), Reggie Nicholson (drums) |
| 1991 | Now & Now | Enemy | Trio, with Lindsey Horner (bass), Reggie Nicholson (drums) |
| 1993 | Alive in the House of Saints | hat ART | Trio, with Lindsey Horner (bass), Reggie Nicholson (drums); in concert |
| 1994 | Eleven Ghosts | hatOLOGY | Duo, co-led with Han Bennink (drums) |
| 1994 | The October Revolution | Evidence Music | One track features a trio led by Melford, with Lindsey Horner (bass) and Tom Rainey (drums). Melford does not appear on the remaining tracks. In concert. |
| 1995 | Even the Sounds Shine | hat ART | Quintet, with Dave Douglas (trumpet), Marty Ehrlich (alto sax, clarinet), Lindsey Horner (bass), Reggie Nicholson (drums) |
| 1996 | The Same River, Twice | Gramavision | Quintet, with Dave Douglas (trumpet), Chris Speed (tenor sax, clarinet), Erik Friedlander (cello), Michael Sarin (drums) |
| 1998 | Above Blue | Arabesque | Quintet, with Dave Douglas (trumpet), Chris Speed (tenor sax, clarinet), Erik Friedlander (cello), Michael Sarin (drums) |
| 1999 | Dance Beyond the Color | Arabesque | Trio, with Stomu Takeishi (electric bass, guitars), Kenny Wollesen (drums); Melford plays harmonium on three tracks |
| 2000 | Yet Can Spring | Arabesque | Duo, co-led with Marty Ehrlich (alto sax, bass clarinet, clarinet) |
| 2002 | Hex | Zerx | with J. A. Deane and Joseph Sabella |
| 2003 | Where the Two Worlds Touch | Arabesque | Quintet, with Cuong Vu (trumpet), Chris Speed (clarinet, tenor sax), Stomu Takeishi (guitars), Kenny Wollesen (drums); Melford also plays harmonium |
| 2003 | The Image of Your Body | Cryptogramophone | Quartet, most tracks with Brandon Ross (guitar, vocals), Stomu Takeishi (bass guitar), Elliot Humberto Kavee (drums); some tracks with Cuong Vu (trumpet, electronics), Takeishi, Kavee; Melford also plays harmonium |
| 2006 | Big Picture | Cryptogramophone | Trio, as "Trio M", with Mark Dresser (bass), Matt Wilson (drums) |
| 2007* | Spark! | Palmetto | Duo, co-led with Marty Ehrlich (alto sax, clarinet) |
| 2007* | Heart Mountain | Perspicacity | Duo, co-led with Tanya Kalmanovitch (viola, violin); Melford also plays harmonium |
| 2007 | Under the Water | Libra | Co-led with Satoko Fujii (piano); three tracks duo; one track each solo piano; in concert |
| 2010* | The Whole Tree Gone | Firehouse 12 | Sextet, with Cuong Vu (trumpet), Ben Goldberg (clarinet, contra-alto clarinet), Brandon Ross (guitars), Stomu Takeishi (bass guitar), Matt Wilson (drums) |
| 2011 | The Guest House | Yellowbird | Trio, as "Trio M", with Mark Dresser (bass), Matt Wilson (drums) |
| 2012 | Everything Here Is Possible | ASM | Duo, co-led with Alister Spence (piano); in concert |
| 2013 | Life Carries Me This Way | Firehouse 12 | Solo piano |
| 2013 | Snowy Egret | Enja/Yellowbird | Quintet, with Ron Miles (cornet), Liberty Ellman (guitar), Stomu Takeishi (bass), Tyshawn Sorey (drums); in concert |
| 2014 | Dialogue | BAG Production | Duo, co-led with Ben Goldberg (clarinet) |
| 2015 | 12 from 25 | Firehouse 12 | With various; in concert |
| 2016 | Unleashed | RogueArt | Trio, as "Tiger Trio", with Nicole Mitchell (flutes), Joëlle Léandre (bass); in concert |
| 2017* | MZM | Infrequent Seams | Trio, with Zeena Parkins (harp), Miya Masaoka (koto) |
| 2017 | The Other Side of Air | Firehouse 12 | Quintet, with Ron Miles (cornet), Liberty Ellman (guitar), Stomu Takeishi (bass), Tyshawn Sorey (drums) |
| 2018 | Map of Liberation | RogueArt | Trio, as "Tiger Trio", with Nicole Mitchell (flutes), Joëlle Léandre (bass); in concert |
| 2021 | For the Love of Fire and Water | RogueArt | Quintet, with Mary Halvorson (guitar), Tomeka Reid (cello), Ingrid Laubrock (sax), Susie Ibarra (drums) |
| 2023 | Hear the Light Singing | RogueArt | Quintet, with Mary Halvorson (guitar), Tomeka Reid (cello), Ingrid Laubrock (sax), Lesley Mok (drums) |

=== As sidewoman ===
With Joseph Jarman and Leroy Jenkins

- Out of the Mist (Ocean, 1997)
- Equal Interest (Omnitone, 1999)

With Allison Miller (drummer)

- Boom Tic Boom (2010)
- Boom Tic Boom Live at Willisau (2012)
- No Morphine, No Lilies (2013)
- Otis Was A Polar Bear (2016)
- Glitter Wolf (2019)

With Scott Fields

- 96 Gestures (2001)

With Henry Threadgill

- Song Out of My Trees (Black Saint, 1994)
- Makin' a Move (Columbia, 1995)
