= Sexmob =

American jazz band

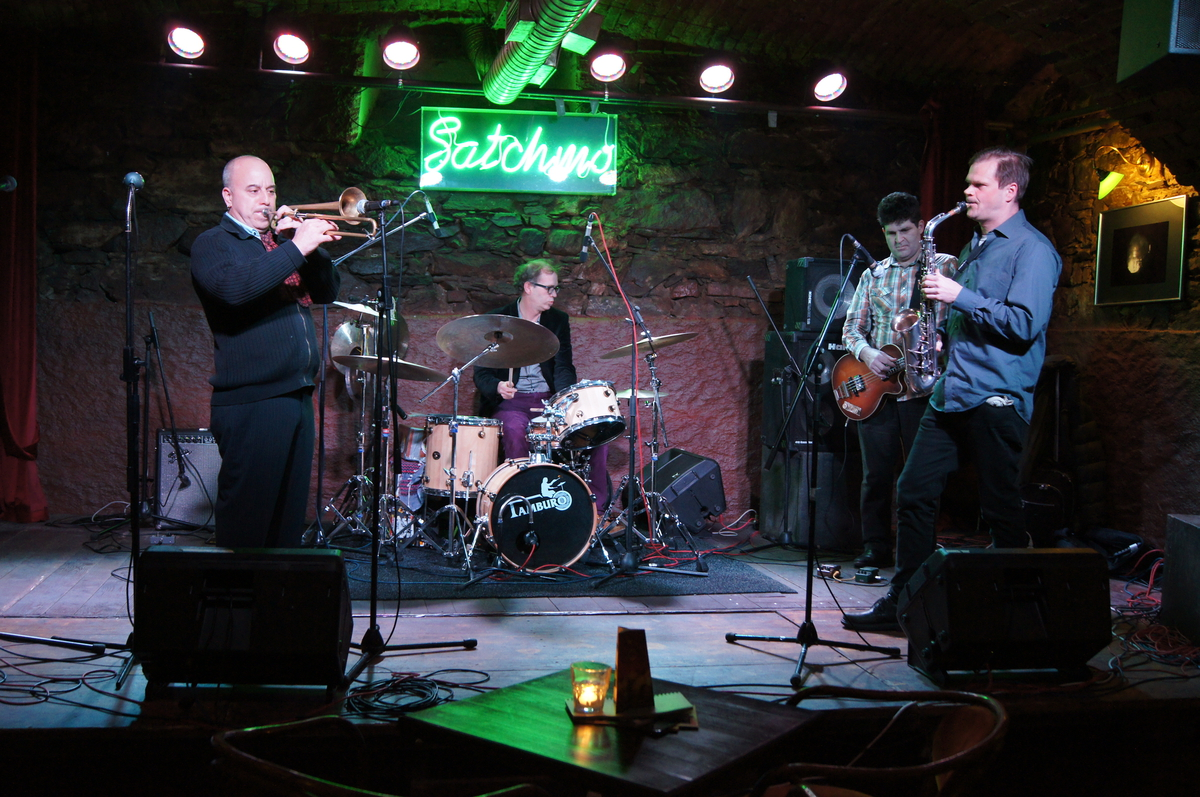
- Sexmob performing live in the Satchmo club, Maribor, Slovenia on November 16, 2011

Background information
- Origin: New York City
- Genres: Jazz
- Labels: Knitting Factory; Ropeadope; Thirsty Ear
- Members: Steven Bernstein; Tony Scherr; Briggan Krauss; Kenny Wollesen

Sexmob (also styled Sex Mob) is an American jazz band based in New York City that formed as a Knitting Factory vehicle for Steven Bernstein to exercise his slide trumpet. Sexmob's sets feature a high proportion of covers, usually familiar pop songs, which are given a humorous but avant-garde treatment. According to Bernstein, this is a return to a fundamental jazz tradition of disassembling and reassembling familiar songs.

Sexmob was Laurie Anderson's band on her 2023-2024 Let X=X tour.

== Discography ==
- Din of Inequity (Knitting Factory, 1998)
- Solid Sender (Knitting Factory, 2000)
- Theatre & Dance (2000)
- Sex Mob Does Bond (Ropeadope, 2001)
- Dime Grind Palace (Ropeadope, 2003)
- Sexotica (Thirsty Ear, 2006)
- Sexmob meets Medeski Live in Willisau 2006 (Thirsty Ear, 2009)
- Sexmob Plays Fellini: Cinema, Circus & Spaghetti, the Music of Nino Rota (2013)
- Cultural Capital (2017)
- The Hard Way (Corbett vs Dempsey, 2023)
- Let X=X (With Laurie Anderson Live, 2026)
