= Above Blue =

Studio album by Myra Melford and The Same River, Twice
- Released: April 6, 1999
- Recorded: March 31 and April 1, 1998
- Studio: Systems II, Brooklyn, NY
- Genre: Jazz
- Length: 62:31
- Label: Arabesque; AJ0142
- Producer: Myra Melford, Dave Douglas

Myra Melford chronology
Eleven Ghosts (1997)	Above Blue (1999)	Dance Beyond the Color (2000)

Above Blue is an album by pianist Myra Melford's group The Same River, Twice which was recorded in 1999 and released on the Gramavision label.

== Reception ==
Professional ratings
Review scores
Source	Rating
AllMusic	4.5/5 stars
All About Jazz	5/5 stars

The Allmusic review by Michael G. Nastos stated "Melford, an original voice on piano if there ever was one, keeps on stretching. With her potent quintet the Same River, Twice, she is the fuse for explosions of deep group interaction, offering visceral harmonic statements while injecting her busy, dancing, at times pensive, and occasionally cluster-laden outspoken style to the forefront, its territory mapped by very few. ... It's easy to find the joy and brilliance in the music of Melford, not to mention the clarity. As she further asserts her muse in a quest to continually be unique and different, everyone benefits, learning and growing as she does. This kind of music is indeed high art, rare, but unquestionably within reach".

In JazzTimes, Bill Shoemaker wrote "On Above Blue (Arabesque), two trend lines merge, and spike upwards as a result. One represents the maturation of her cohorts ... The other line charts the increasing natural flow and communicative immediacy with which Melford animates weighty compositional propositions. Throughout this wide-ranging program, Melford goes a step beyond a seamless mastery of the recombinant Downtown aesthetic of the ’80s and ’90s to achieve a rare paradox: by writing so precisely to the strengths of her collaborators, she has created highly personal work".

On All About Jazz, Glenn Astarita said "On Above Blue, Ms. Melford’s impressive track record of performing with top-notch musicians and churning out enticingly complex compositions remain intact. ... Above Blue may in fact be Melford’s finest outing to date. The brilliant ensemble work coupled with Melford’s multifaceted upfront compositional style makes for compelling listening. Myra Melford is one of jazz’ treasures and has accomplished quite a bit during her 10 year tenure within the modern jazz scene. Above Blue along with Ms. Melford’s “Same River Twice” band is a bold yet deeply personalized statement from this brilliant pianist-composer", while Robert Spencer observed "Myra Melford's piano is a welter of extraordinary activity, although unlike some other players with her power, even when her playing is at its most furious it always seems to be melodically, not percussively, rooted. She is once again surrounded on this disc by cutting-edge modern jazz players ... This group navigates Melford's rhythmically tenuous and complex ensemble passages with notable aplomb. The music is always excellent, albeit somewhat hard to classify: Melford draws from the spectrum of the jazz tradition to create something utterly new. Its emotional range is breathtaking and the virtuosity of the performers is tremendous ... What's most impressive is how finely crafted this music is, while at the same time leaving so much space for each instrumentalist to display his creativity to the utmost. Recommended".

== Track listing ==
All compositions by Myra Melford

1. "Two But Live" – 4:52
2. "A White Flower Grows in the Quietness" – 9:47
3. "Yet Can Spring" – 8:17
4. "Here Is Only Moment" – 5:31
5. "Above Blue" – 11:58
6. "Be Melting Snow" – 6:56
7. "Through Storm's Embrace" – 12:08
8. "Still in After's Shadow" – 6:13

== Personnel ==
- Myra Melford – piano
- Dave Douglas – trumpet
- Chris Speed – tenor saxophone, clarinet
- Erik Friedlander – cello
- Michael Sarin – drums
