= Vignettes (Ray Drummond album) =

Studio album by Ray Drummond
- Released: 1996
- Recorded: August 23 & 24, 1995
- Studio: EastSide Sound, New York City
- Genre: Jazz
- Length: 62:23
- Label: Arabesque; AJ-0122
- Producer: Ray Drummond

Ray Drummond chronology
Continuum (1994)	Vignettes (1996)	1-2-3-4 (1999)

Vignettes is an album by bassist Ray Drummond which was recorded in 1995 and released on the Arabesque label the following year.

== Reception ==
Professional ratings
Review scores
Source	Rating
AllMusic	4/5 stars
The Penguin Guide to Jazz Recordings	3.5/4 stars

The AllMusic review by Scott Yanow said "On what is generally an extroverted session, the bassist's two "Ballade Poetiques" serve as a change of pace, fairly free flights for the trio that are quite introspective. ... A fine post bop session".

== Track listing ==
All compositions by Ray Drummond except where noted

1. "Susanita-Like" – 7:58
2. "Ballade Poetique #2" – 4:33
3. "Dance to the Lady" (John Handy) – 12:18
4. "Dedication (To John Hicks)" – 6:32
5. "I-95" – 10:02
6. "Poor Butterfly" (Raymond Hubbell, John Golden) – 8:20
7. "Eleanor Rigby" (John Lennon, Paul McCartney) – 8:41
8. "Ballade Poetique #1" – 3:45

== Personnel ==
- Ray Drummond – double bass
- Gary Bartz – alto saxophone, soprano saxophone
- Chris Potter – tenor saxophone
- Renee Rosnes – piano
- Billy Hart – drums
