= Michael Sarin =

American jazz drummer (born 1965)

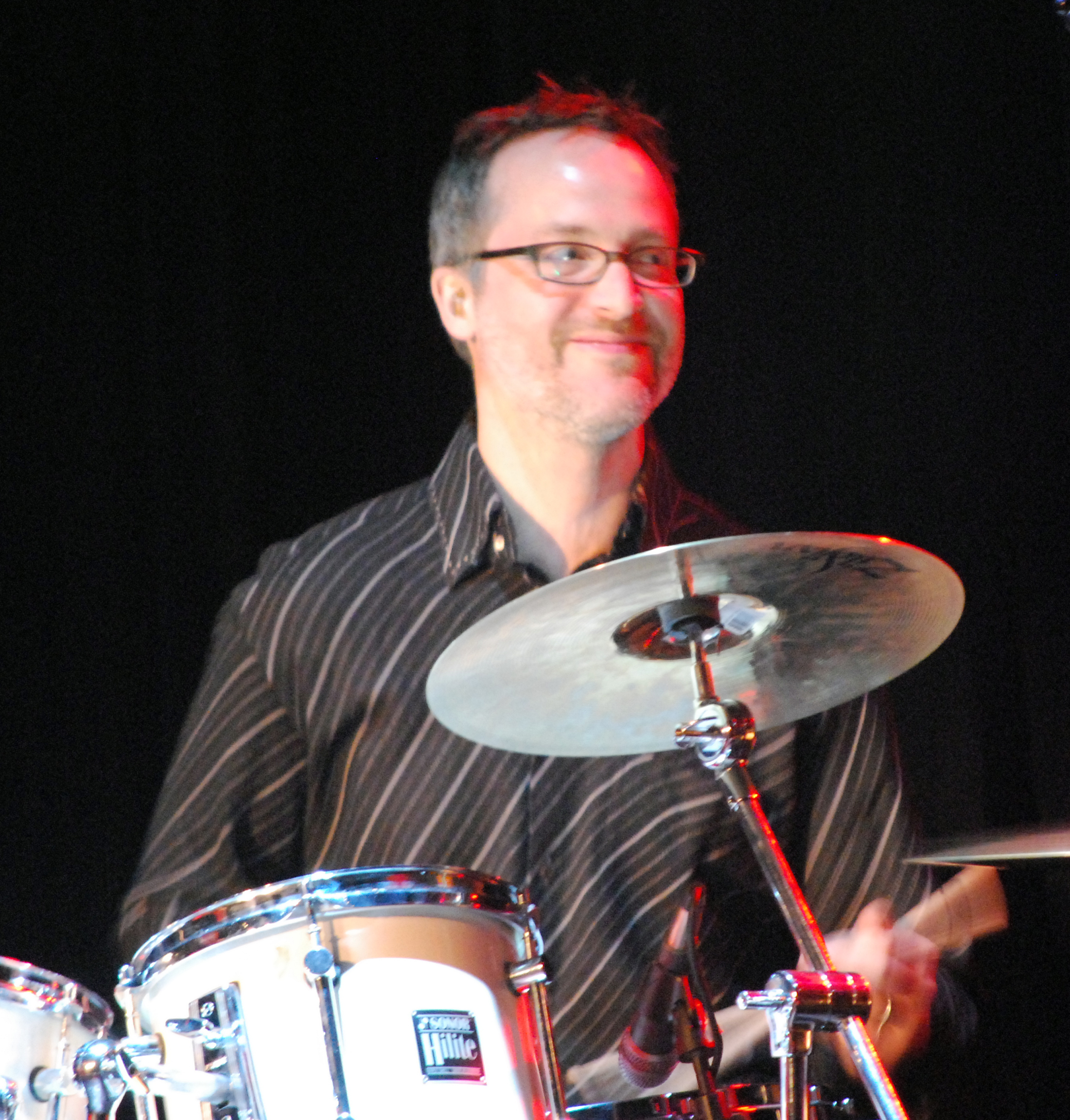
- Sarin in 2009
- Born: Michael Towne Sarin; September 20, 1965 (age 61); Stockton, California, U.S.
- Education: University of Washington; Cornish College of the Arts
- Occupation: Jazz drummer

Michael Towne Sarin (born 20 September 1965) is an American jazz drummer noted for his work in New York City's avant-garde jazz scene.

== Early life and education ==
Born in Stockton, California, Sarin moved as a child to the Puget Sound region. He studied percussion privately before attending the University of Washington and Cornish College of the Arts in Seattle, where he focused on jazz and classical drumming techniques.

== Career ==
In the early 1990s, Sarin relocated to New York City, joining the downtown jazz and improvisation community. He collaborated with saxophonist Thomas Chapin and trumpeter Dave Douglas. Sarin also performed as a member of the Thomas Chapin Trio, alongside bassist Mario Pavone.

== Musical style and influences ==
Sarin's drumming blends precise rhythmic frameworks with free improvisation, noted for its dynamic textures and polyrhythmic complexity. Influences include Tony Williams, Jack DeJohnette, and global percussion traditions.

== Collaborations ==
- Member of Dave Douglas's core ensemble (1996–2002), featured on Five, Convergence, and Witness.
- Collaborated with pianist Myra Melford on The Same River, Twice and Above Blue.
- Drummer on Tony Malaby / Tom Rainey / Michael Sarin / Drew Gress's Apparitions (2003).
- Member of Anthony Coleman's Sephardic Tinge.
- Formed the trio Open Stream and the pandemic group Relative Motion.

== Teaching and workshops ==
Sarin has conducted masterclasses at the New York Jazz Workshop and contributed to drumming podcasts.

== Discography ==
With Dave Douglas

- Five (Soul Note, 1996)
- Convergence (Arabesque, 1999)
- Witness (RCA, 2001)

With Myra Melford

- The Same River, Twice (Gramavision, 1996)
- Above Blue (Arabesque, 1999)

With Tony Malaby / Tom Rainey / Drew Gress

- Apparitions (2003)

With Anthony Coleman

- Sephardic Tinge (date unknown)

With The Other Quartet

- The Other Quartet (date unknown)

With Relative Motion

- Relative Motion (pandemic-era trio; date unknown)
