= Soprano trombone =

Musical instrument in the trombone family

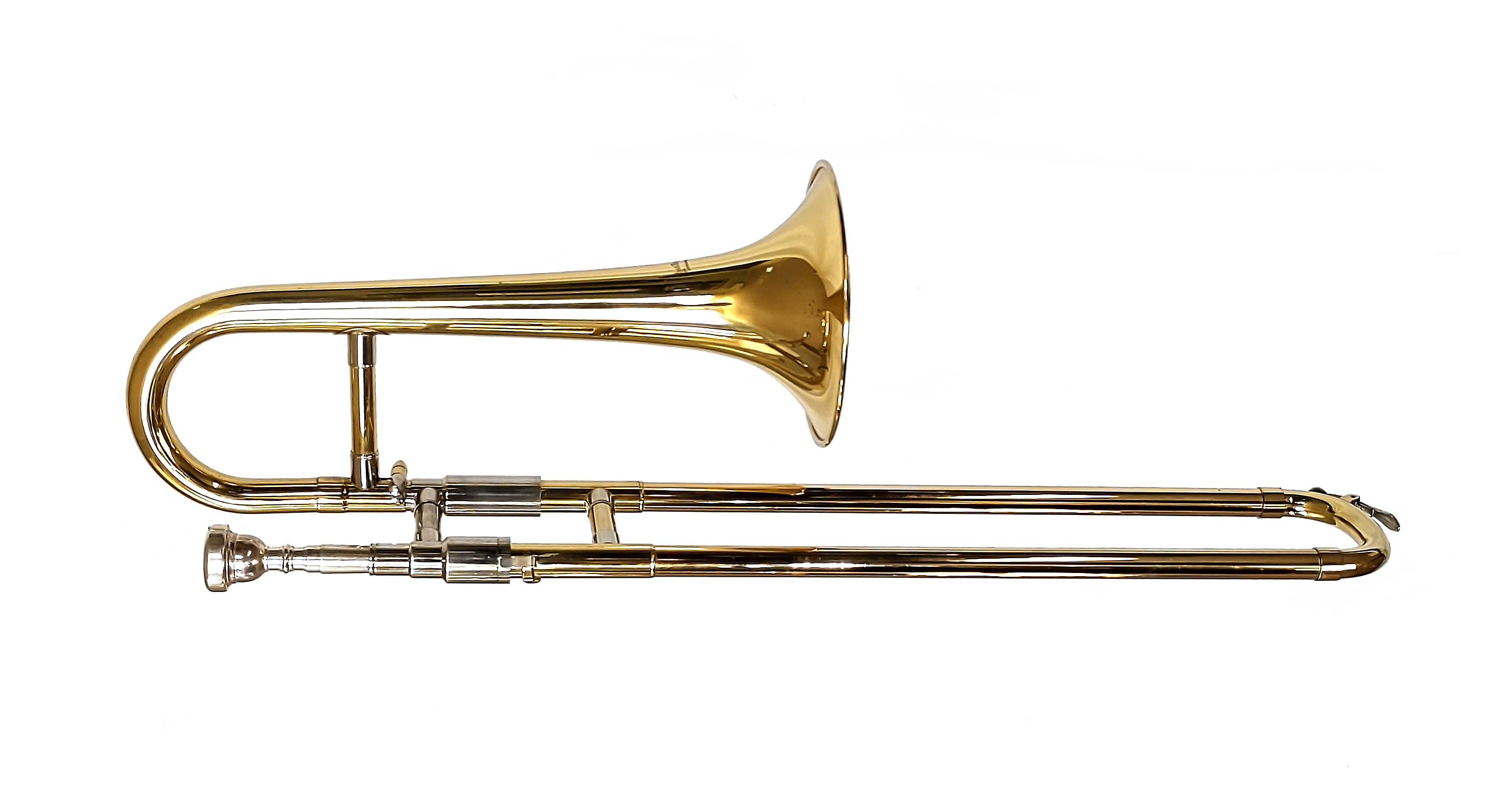
- Soprano trombone in B♭

Brass instrument
- Other names: Slide trumpet; Slide cornet
- Classification: Wind; Brass; Aerophone
- Hornbostel–Sachs classification: 423.22 (Sliding aerophone sounded by lip vibration)
- Developed: Late 17th century

Playing range
- The sounding range of the B♭ soprano trombone is the same as the B♭ trumpet.

Related instruments
- Firebird; Trombone; Trumpet

Musicians
- Louis Armstrong; Steven Bernstein; Dizzy Gillespie; Wycliffe Gordon; Torbjörn Hultmark; Christian Scott

Builders
- Carol; Jinbao; Miraphone; Thein; Helmut Voigt; Wessex; Historical: Buescher; Conn; Getzen; H. N. White (early 20th c.); Jupiter; Kanstul (c. 2005–2020)

The soprano trombone (sometimes called a slide trumpet or slide cornet, especially in jazz) is the soprano instrument in the trombone family of brass instruments, pitched in B♭ an octave above the tenor trombone. As the bore, bell and mouthpiece are similar to the B♭ trumpet, it tends to be played by trumpet players rather than trombonists. Compared to tenor, bass, or even uncommon alto, the soprano is a rare trombone. Seldom used in classical music since its first known appearance in 1677, it survived principally in the trombone ensembles of Moravian Church music. During the 20th century some soprano trombones—dubbed slide cornets—were made as novelties or for use by jazz trumpet players including Louis Armstrong and Dizzy Gillespie. A small number of contemporary proponents of the instrument include jazz artists Wycliffe Gordon and Christian Scott, and classical trumpeter Torbjörn Hultmark, who advocates for its use as an instrument for young children to learn the trombone.

== History ==
Whether the soprano trombone was ever widely used in history is still a matter for debate. The earliest surviving instrument was made in 1677, held by the Landesmuseum in Linz. German Baroque composer Johann Sebastian Bach composed three cantatas around 1723 with four trombone parts, the highest written in soprano clef for a diskant-posaune (lit. 'descant trombone').

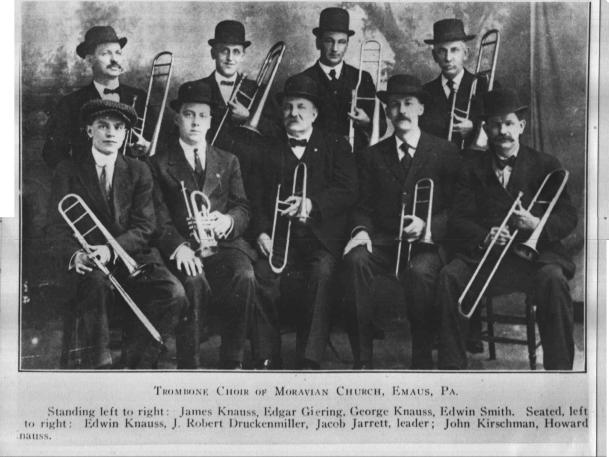
Trombone Choir of the Moravian Church in Emaus, Pennsylvania, c. 1900. Two in the front row are holding soprano trombones.

The soprano trombone was used in German-speaking countries to play the treble part in chorales, and this tradition survives in the trombone choirs of Moravian Church music. Outside of this, there is little evidence of the instrument being employed in musical ensembles or written works since the 18th century. This may have been because the Stadtpfeiffer (lit. 'town pipers'), who were trained to play all instruments, found fast and high (soprano) passages easier to play on the cornett.

Soprano trombone is seldom mentioned in the major orchestration treatises of the 19th century. German musicologist Adolf Bernhard Marx (1847) and English music scholar Ebenezer Prout (1897) only mention the soprano to state that it is considered obsolete, and French organist and composer Charles-Marie Widor in his 1904 treatise only mentioned that some manufacturers were still making them, while describing the alto as obsolete.

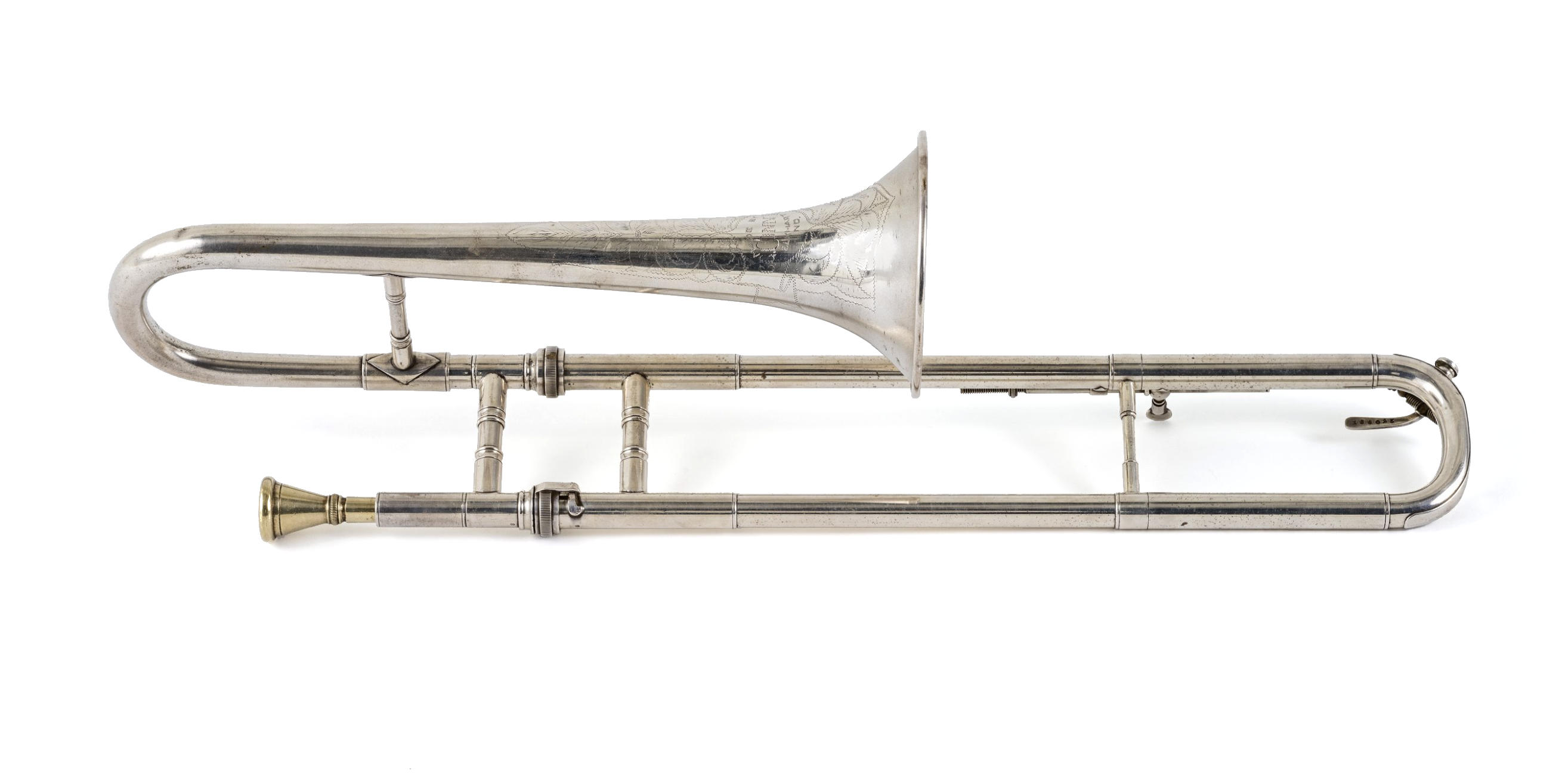
Slide cornet New Wonder model by C. G. Conn, 1921; built in B♭ adjustable to A with in-slide tuning

From 1900 through to the 1930s some soprano trombones—dubbed slide cornets—were made, mainly for jazz, by American manufacturers C. G. Conn, Buescher, and H. N. White. These instruments used tuning in the slide, rather than on the bow of the bell section. Later, Getzen produced an inexpensive slide trumpet in the 1960s. These were used by a few jazz trumpet players like Louis Armstrong, Bobby Hackett and Dizzy Gillespie, but otherwise were not widely adopted. In the 1970s and 80s, Los Angeles instrument makers Robb Stewart, Larry Minick, and Dominic Calicchio were making soprano trombones for local players including Bob and Chuck Findley, Eugene Lebeaux, and players in Moravian trombone choirs.

== Construction ==
The B♭ soprano trombone is built with dimensions similar to the B♭ trumpet. The bore size is between 0.450 and 0.470 inches (11.4 and 11.9 mm), and the bell is 5 to 6 inches (130 to 150 mm) in diameter. It usually takes a trumpet mouthpiece, although some instruments are made with a smaller shank to take a cornet mouthpiece. The slide of a soprano trombone is much shorter than that of a standard tenor trombone, with the slide positions only half the distance apart.

Soprano trombones are made by several trombone manufacturers, often as novelty instruments. An inexpensive model made in China by Jinbao is also resold as a stencil instrument by several suppliers, including Dillon, O'Malley and Schiller. High quality professional instruments are made by German manufacturers Miraphone, Thein and Helmut Voigt.

=== Valve attachment ===
Californian instrument makers Larry Minick and Robb Stewart were making soprano trombones to order in the 1980s, some of which included an F attachment, a valve operated with a left thumb lever or trigger similar to those found on larger trombones. In the early 2010s, trumpeter Torbjörn Hultmark of the Royal College of Music commissioned a soprano trombone with an F valve from Thein. Helmut Voigt also makes a soprano with an F valve.

=== Sizes ===
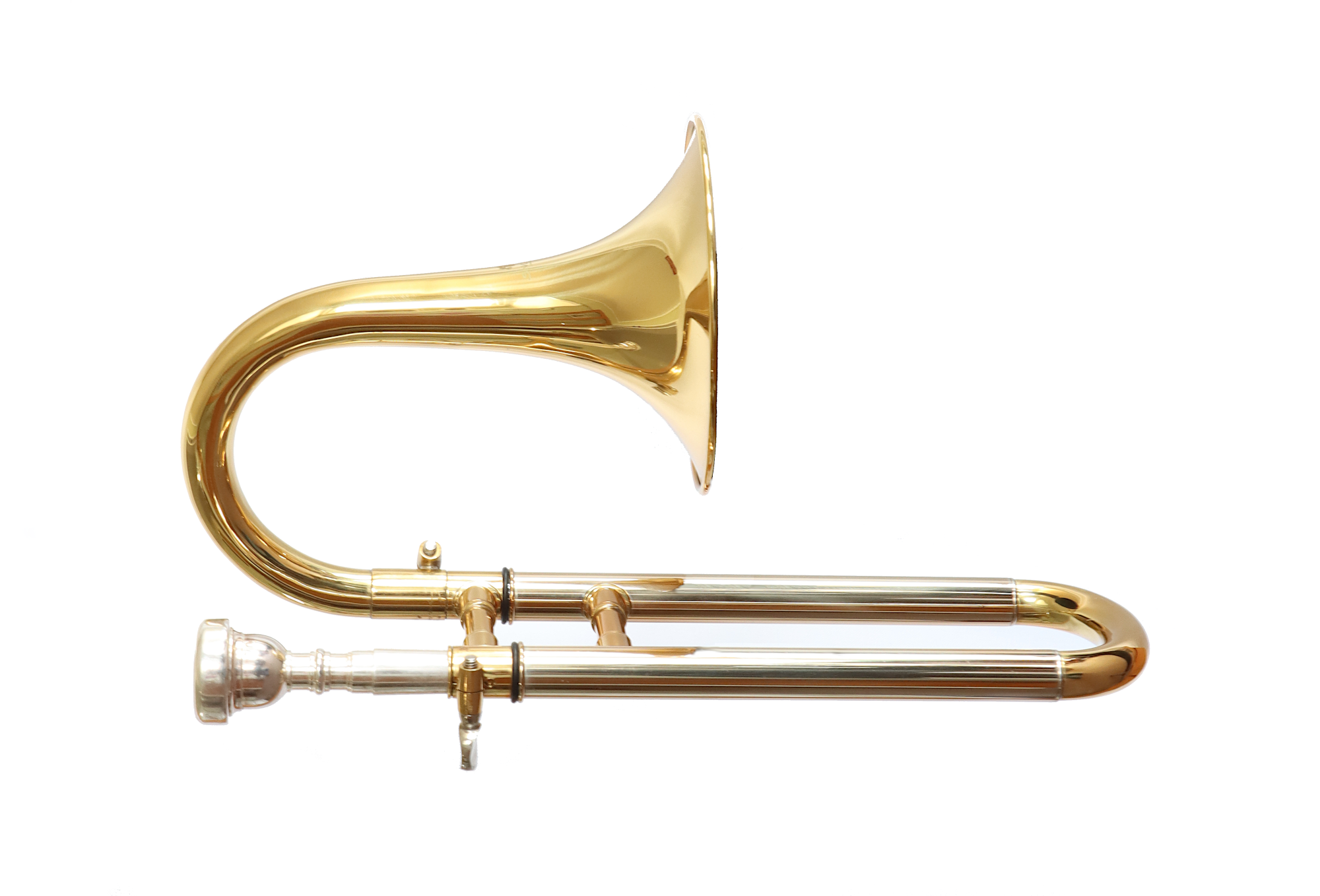
Piccolo trombone in B♭

Trombones smaller than the soprano have only been built since the 1950s, when they first appeared as novelty or "show" instruments.

The sopranino trombone in E♭, a fourth higher than the soprano and an octave above the alto, exists only in small numbers custom made, mainly for Moravian churches in the United States.

The piccolo trombone in B♭ is an octave above the soprano. It is essentially a piccolo trumpet with a slide instead of valves, and is used with a piccolo trumpet mouthpiece. Bore sizes are 0.460 inches (11.7 mm) or smaller, with bells approximately 4 inches (10 cm) in diameter. The piccolo is offered by Thein, Chinese manufacturer Jinbao, and Wessex. Thein also make a novelty piccolino trombone in F, a fifth higher than the B♭ piccolo, originally made for the German Brass ensemble.

== Performance, range and pedagogy ==
The soprano trombone's similarity to the trumpet—its high pitch, mouthpiece size and narrow embouchure—means it is usually played by trumpeters. The player must combine both trumpet playing and trombone slide techniques to control intonation and note selection accuracy.

The (sounding) range of the B♭ soprano trombone.

Soprano trombone parts are usually written in treble clef and, like the trumpet, can be in concert pitch or transposed in B♭. The range of the B♭ soprano trombone is similar to the B♭ trumpet, E_{3} to C_{6}.

As part of his "Soprano Trombone Project", Torbjörn Hultmark has used the instrument to successfully begin children on brass instruments from as young as the age of four, and is the world's first registered Suzuki teacher in soprano trombone. Hultmark has also worked with the British Music Teachers Board to produce a syllabus of grade examinations for the soprano trombone. Other researchers have reported the soprano trombone can also be used as a pedagogical tool to help trumpet players improve several core aspects of their playing technique.

== Repertoire ==
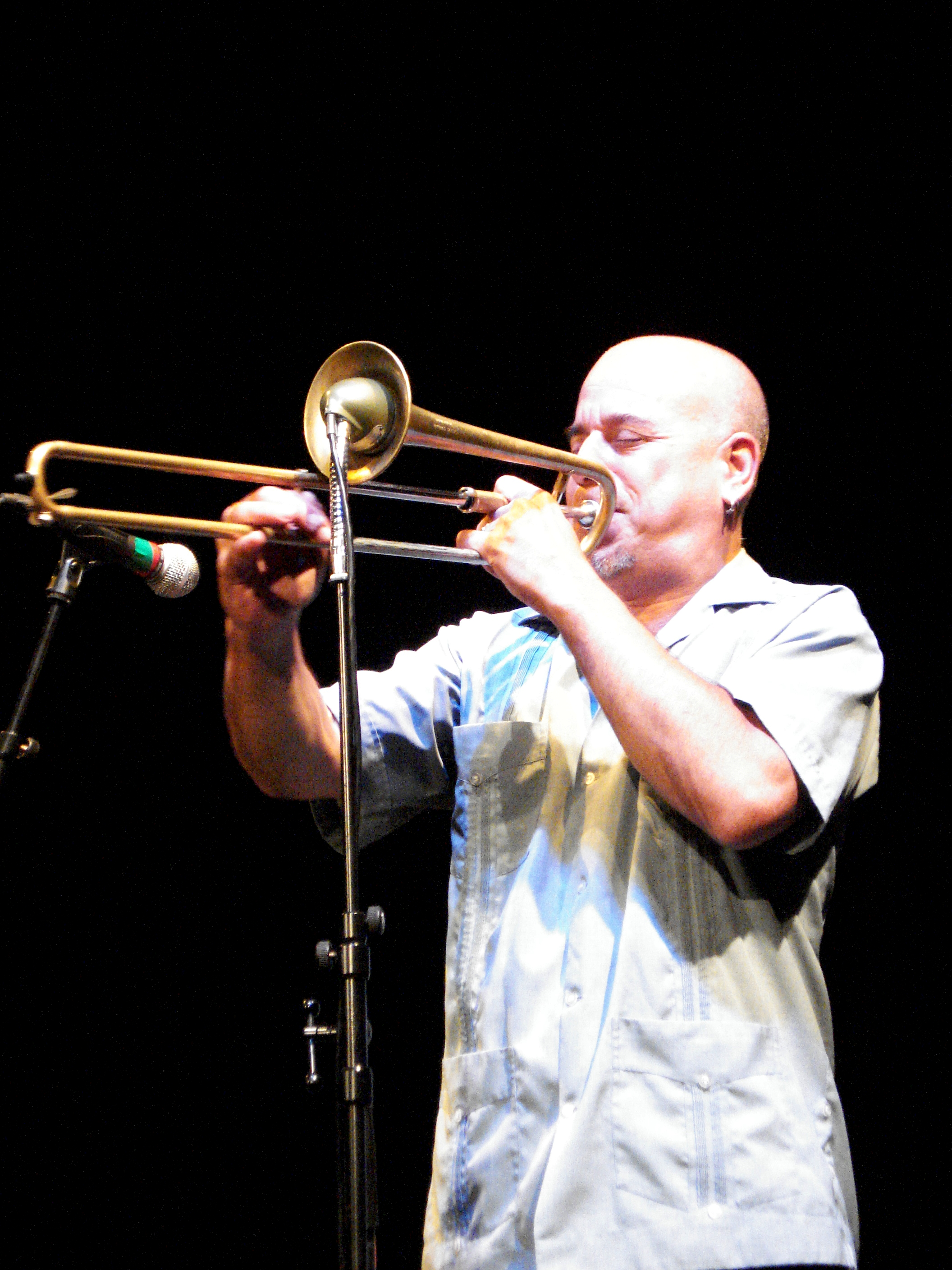
Steven Bernstein performing in Saalfelden, 2009

There is very little classical repertoire written specifically for soprano trombone. The earliest pieces are three cantatas by Johann Sebastian Bach and two passions by Georg Philipp Telemann (as edited by his grandson) from the early 18th century, and a large body of Moravian Church music for trombone choir from the late 18th and 19th century.

In contemporary music, composers have very occasionally included soprano trombone in orchestral works. British composer Brian Ferneyhough called for two in his large 2006 work Plötzlichkeit; after playing one of the parts in a performance, Hultmark became a proponent of the soprano trombone as a serious instrument. He has written and commissioned several new compositions for it.

In jazz, some contemporary artists are employing the soprano trombone in their work. Wycliffe Gordon and Christian Scott both use the instrument in solos and on their albums. New York musician Steven Bernstein has become well known for playing the "slide trumpet" in his band, Sexmob.

== Bibliography ==
- Guion, David M. (2010). A History of the Trombone. Toronto: The Scarecrow Press. ISBN 978-0-8108-7445-9. LCCN 2010000846. OCLC 725775517. OL 24019524M. Wikidata Q111039945.
- Herbert, Trevor (2006). The Trombone. Yale Musical Instrument Series. New Haven: Yale University Press. ISBN 978-0-300-23575-3. OCLC 1007305405. OL 30593699M. Wikidata Q111039091.
- Herbert, Trevor; Myers, Arnold; Wallace, John, eds. (2019). The Cambridge Encyclopedia of Brass Instruments. Cambridge University Press. doi:10.1017/9781316841273. ISBN 978-1-316-63185-0. OL 34730943M. Wikidata Q136027509.
- Klaus, Sabine Katharina (2013). Ways to Expand the Harmonic Series. Trumpets and Other High Brass. Vol. 2. Vermillion: National Music Museum. ISBN 978-0-9848269-2-6. Wikidata Q116447957.
- Yeo, Douglas (2021). An Illustrated Dictionary for the Modern Trombone, Tuba, and Euphonium Player. Dictionaries for the Modern Musician. Illustrator: Lennie Peterson. Lanham: Rowman & Littlefield. ISBN 978-1-5381-5966-8. LCCN 2021020757. OCLC 1249799159. OL 34132790M. Wikidata Q111040546.
