= Thomas Chapin =

American composer and saxophonist

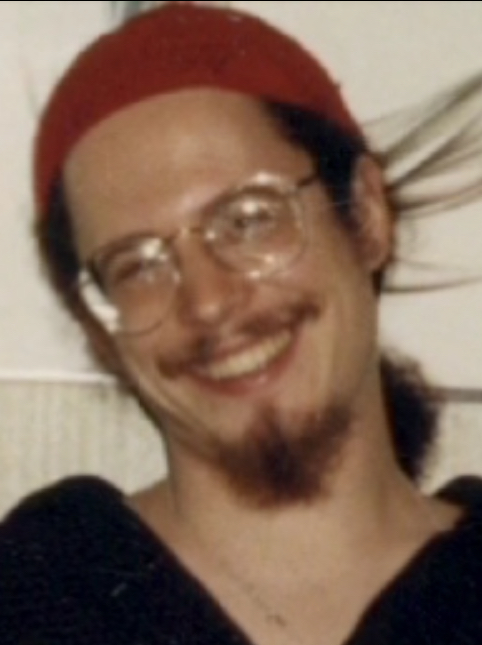
- Born: 9 March 1957; Manchester, Connecticut, U.S
- Died: 13 February 1998 (aged 40); Providence, Rhode Island, U.S
- Education: Hartt College of Music; Rutgers University, Music (BA)
- Occupations: Musician; composer
- Spouse: Terri Castillo Chapin (m. 1997)
- Musical career
- Genre: Jazz
- Instruments: Saxophone; Flute
- Years active: c. 1975–1998
- Labels: Knitting Factory Records; NoBusiness; Boxholder; Koch; MuWorks; Alacra; Epsa; Arabesque
- Formerly of: Thomas Chapin Trio; Lionel Hampton Orchestra
- Website: Official website

Thomas Chapin (March 9, 1957 – February 13, 1998) was an American composer and saxophonist and multi-instrumentalist. His music spanned the full range of 20th century creative music, from his time as Lionel Hampton's bandleader to modern jazz and his own avant-garde explorations. He helped create the Knitting Factory scene in New York City in the early 80's and was the first artist signed to Knitting Factory Records. Though primarily an alto saxophonist, he also played sopranino, as well as soprano, tenor, baritone saxes and flute. Many of his recordings as a leader were in a trio with bassist Mario Pavone and drummer Michael Sarin. Chapin studied with Jackie McLean, Paul Jeffrey, Kenny Barron, and Lionel Hampton. He died of leukemia at age 40. He played at a benefit concert two weeks before his death.

== Career ==
Chapin was born on March 9, 1957, in Manchester, Connecticut. He attended Phillips Academy in Andover, Massachusetts, where he studied classical music and jazz. In the late 1970s, he attended the Hartt School of Music at the University of Hartford in Connecticut, studying with saxophonist Jackie McLean. He played frequently in the Hartford and Amherst, Massachusetts areas until moving in 1980 to Brooklyn, New York with fellow musicians Dave Phillips and George Kormendi. He studied at Rutgers University with saxophonist Paul Jeffrey, pianist Kenny Barron, and guitarist Ted Dunbar. He graduated from Rutgers in 1980. From 1981 to 1986, he toured with Lionel Hampton as lead saxophonist and musical director. He performed with Chico Hamilton's band from 1988 to 1989.

In the late 1980s, he formed quartets, quintets, and a band and album devoted to Brazilian music, Spirits Rebellious (Alacra). He founded Machine Gun with guitarist Robert Musso and a trio with bassist Mario Pavone and drummers Steve Johns and later Michael Sarin. In 1994, the trio performed at Madarao Jazz Festival in Japan, where he also played with Betty Carter, and at the Newport Jazz Festival in 1995. He formed larger groups (Trio with Brass, Insomnia, Haywire, and Trio with Strings) and performed with Ray Drummond, Anthony Braxton, Tom Harrell, Sonny Sharrock, John Zorn, Walter Thompson, Dave Douglas, Marty Ehrlich, and Ned Rothenberg. He recorded over fifteen albums as a leader.

Chapin died of leukemia in 1998 at the age of 40.

== Discography ==
=== As leader and co-leader ===
Musicians	Album	Label	Date	Format
George Alford, Peter McEachern, Phil Buettner, Nick Makros, Lucian Williams, Mario Pavone, Emmett Spencer, Matt Emerzian	The Bell of the Heart	Alacra 1005	recorded and released 1981	LP
Ronnie Mathews, Ray Drummond, John Betsch et al.	Radius	MuWorks 1005; US	recorded 1984, released 1990	CD, LP, CS
Machine Gun (Robert Musso/Thomas Chapin/John Lunar RIchey/Jair–Rohm Parker Wells/Bil Bryant) + Sonny Sharrock/Karl Berger	Live at CBGB's Vol. 1 : June 2, 1987	MuWorks 37 CR; US	released 2008	CD
Francesca Vanasco, Saul Rubin, Thad Wheeler, Geoffrey Gordon	Spirits Rebellious	Alacra 1017; US	recorded and released 1988	LP
Motation (Mario Pavone, Michael Musillami, Thomas Chapin, Peter McEachern, George Sovak, Mike Duquette)	Live at the Hillside	Alacra 1014; US	recorded 1988, released 1989	LP
Machine Gun + Sonny Sharrock	Machine Gun	Muworks 1001; US	recorded and released 1988	CD, LP, CS
Machine Gun + Sonny Sharrock	Live at the Gas Station: December 3, 1988	MuWorks 46 CR; US	released 2008	CD
Machine Gun + Sonny Sharrock	Open Fire	MuWorks 1003; US	recorded and released 1989	CD, LP, CS
Machine Gun	Live from the Court Tavern: February 24, 1990 + December 8, 1990	MuWorks DR 03; US	released 2008	DVD
Thomas Chapin Trio with Mario Pavone, Steve Johns	Third Force	KnitWorks 103; US	recorded 1900–1991, released 1991	CD
Machine Gun	Live From the Webo Art Space: September 22, 199	MuWorks DR 01; US)	released 2008	DVD
Thomas Chapin Trio with Mario Pavone/Steve Johns	Anima	KnitWorks 121 B; US	recorded 1991, released 1992	CD, CS
Thomas Chapin & Borah Bergman	Inversions	MuWorks 1009; US	recorded and released 1992	CD, CS
Machine Gun	Pass the Ammo	MuWorks 1011; US	recorded and released 1992	CD, LP, CS
William Hooker	Crossing Points	NoBusiness LP 30/31; Lithuania	recorded 1992, released 2011	2–LP set
William Hooker	Crossing Points	NoBusiness CD 28; Lithuania	recorded 1992, released 2011	CD
Mario Pavone, Michael Sarin + Brass: Frank London, Curtis Fowlkes, Peter McEachern, Marcus Rojas, Al Bryant	Insomnia	KnitWorks 132; US	recorded 1992, released 1993	CD
Mario Pavone, Michael Sarin	Night Bird Song	KnitWorks 240; US	recorded 1992, released 1998	CD
Ronnie Mathews, Ray Drummond, Steve Johns	I've Got Your Number	Arabesque 110; US	recorded and released 1993	CD
Mario Pavone, Michael Sarin + John Zorn, Vernon Frazer	Menagerie Dreams	KnitWorks 167; US	recorded and released 1994	CD
Tom Harrell, Peter Madsen, Kiyoto Fujiwara, Reggie Nicholson	You Don't Know Me	Arabesque 115; US	recorded 1994, released 1995	CD
Mario Pavone, Michael Sarin	Ride: North Sea Jazz Festival 1995	Playscape 71595; US	released 2006	CD
Peter Madsen, Kiyoto Fujiwara or Scott Colley, Reggie Nicholson or Matt Wilson	Never Let Me Go: Quartets '95 & '96	Playscape 111095; US	released 2012	3-CD set
Avantango (Pablo Aslan, Thomas Chapin, Ethan Iverson)	Y en el 2000 tambien: Tango & Jazz	Epsa 16020; Brazil	recorded 1996	CD
Peggy Stern, Thomas Chapin Quartet with Drew Gress, Bobby Previte	The Fuchsia	Koch 7837; US	recorded 1995, released 1997	CD
Mario Pavone, Michael Sarin + Strings: Mark Feldman, Boris Raskin, Kiyoto Fujiwara	Haywire: Live at The Knitting Factory 1996	KnitWorks 176; US	released 1996	CD
Mario Pavone, Michael Sarin	Sky Piece	KnitWorks 208; US	recorded 1996, released 1998	CD
Borah Bergman	Toronto 1997	Boxholder 033; US	released 2003	CD

=== As sideman ===
With Machine Gun

- Machine Gun (MU 1988)
- Open Fire (Mu New York 1989)
- Pass the Ammo (MuWorks, 1991)
- WFMU (MuWorks, 2000)
- Live at CBGB's Vol 1 06/02/87 (Musso Music, 2007)
- Live at the Gas Station 12/03/88 (Musso Music, 2007)

With Mario Pavone

- Sharpeville (Alacra, 1988)
- Toulon Days (New World/CounterCurrents, 1992)
- Song for Septet (New World/CounterCurrents, 1994)
- Dancers Tales (Knitting Factory, 1997)

With others

- Borah Bergman, Toronto 1997 (Boxholder, 2003)
- Michael Blake, Kingdom of Champa (Intuition, 1997)
- Anthony Braxton & Mario Pavone, Seven Standards 1995 (Knitting Factory, 1995)
- Barbara Dennerlein, Junkanoo (Verve, 1997)
- Armen Donelian, Quartet Language (Playscape, 2003)
- Ray Drummond, Continuum (Arabesque, 1994)
- Pamela Fleming, Fearless Dreamer (Infinite Room, 1998)
- Lionel Hampton, Made in Japan (Glad-Hamp, 1984)
- Lionel Hampton, Sentimental Journey (Glad-Hamp, 1985)
- William Hooker, Crossing Points (NoBusiness 2011)
- Frank London, Scientist at Work (Tzadik, 2002)
- Medeski Martin & Wood, Notes from the Underground (Accurate, 1992)
- Robert Musso, Active Resonance (Tokuma, 1992)
- Ned Rothenberg, Overlays (Moers Music, 1991)
- Ned Rothenberg, Real and Imagined Time (Moers Music, 1995)
- Daniel Schnyder, Tarantula (Enja, 1996)
- Peggy Stern, The Fuchsia (Koch, 1997)
- Walter Thompson, The Colonel (Nine Winds 1998)
- Axel Zwingenberger, The Boogie Woogie Album (Telefunken, 1982)

== Books ==
- Thomas Chapin. Ten Compositions (sheet music book of original compositions) (Peace Park Publishing/Akasha; US)

== Documentaries ==
- Music Man: Thomas Chapin directed by Terri Castillo, 1989
- Dancing Chicken Man: Thomas Chapin on YouTube directed by Terri Castillo, 1991
- Newport Jazz Festival, 1995 on YouTube with features of the Thomas Chapin Trio directed by Richard Buxenbaum for Festival Productions, 1995
- Jazz Man: Thomas Chapin on YouTube directed by Stephanie J. Castillo, 2004
- Night Bird Song: The Thomas Chapin Story directed by Stephanie J. Castillo, released in 2016, winner "Best Story" Award, 2016 Nice (France) International Film Festival; shown at Monterey (CA) Jazz Fest, Sept., 2016
