= Peter Madsen (pianist) =

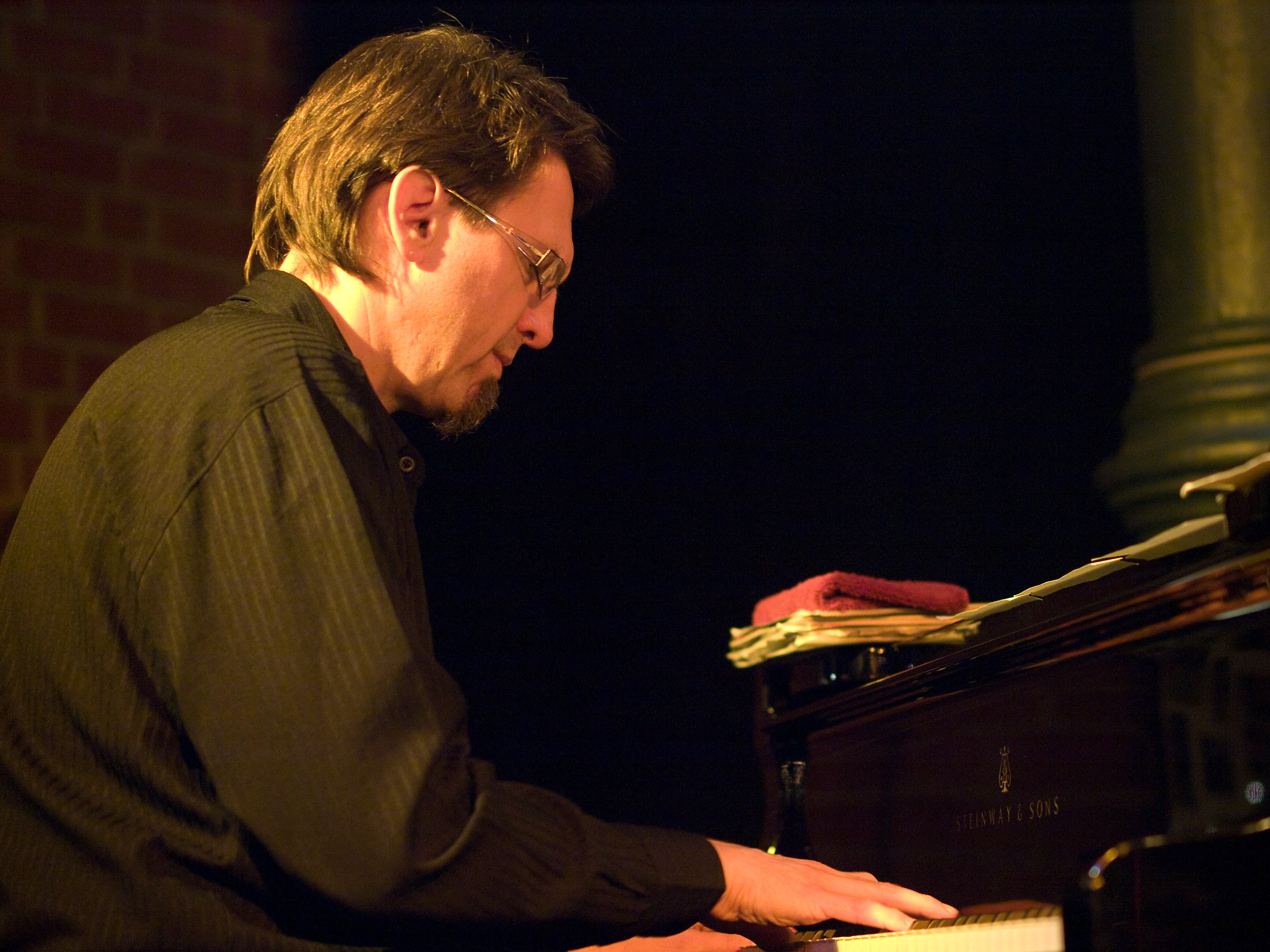

Background information
- Born: July 19, 1955 (age 70); Racine, Wisconsin
- Genres: Jazz
- Occupation: Musician
- Instrument: Piano
- Years active: 1970–present

Peter Madsen is an American jazz pianist.

== Early life ==
Madsen was born in Racine, Wisconsin, where he started playing classical piano at eight years old and classical double bass at age ten. At thirteen he started to play the piano in the jazz idiom. He attended the University of Wisconsin-Eau Claire where he majored in music education. In 1980 he moved to New York City where he got a break in the jazz world when Stan Getz invited him to tour in Europe. After his tour with Getz, he began performing regularly with many jazz musicians. He also embarked on a career as a headliner in the Peter Madsen Trio. He runs the Collective of Improvising Artists.

== Career ==
He has performed on over 160 CDs and has worked as a composer and arranger. He has composed over 600 pieces and has recorded hundreds. He has worked with Tony Allen, Arthur Blythe, Randy Brecker, Oscar Brown Jr., Bobby Byrd, Don Cherry, George Coleman, Lynn Collins, Ravi Coltrane, Pee Wee Ellis, Sonny Fortune, Kenny Garrett, Stan Getz, Benny Golson, Martha High, Toninho Horta, David Liebman, Cheikh Lo, Joe Lovano, Vusi Mahlasela, Maceo Parker, Chris Potter, Mahotella Queens, Dewey Redman, James Spaulding, Stanley Turrentine, Fred Wesley, and Carla White. His students have included Bill Carrothers, Maria Schneider and David Helbock) in Austria, Japan, and the United States.

== Discography ==
=== As leader ===
- Snuggling Snakes (Minor Music, 1993)
- Peter & Peter. Darkness Pursues the Butterfly (PAO, 1995)
- Sphere Essence: Another Side of Monk (Playscape, 2003)
- Prevue of Tomorrow (Playscape, 2006)
- Klemens Marktl Free Spirit Quartet Live (Alessa, 2008)
- The Litchfield Suite (Playscape, 2010)
- Gravity of Love (Playscape, 2012)
- Transformation (HGBS, 2013)
- Satin Doll: A Tribute to Billy Strayhorn (Playscape, 2017)
- Never Bet the Devil Your Head (Playscape, 2018)
- Curiouser & Curiouser (Playscape, 2019)

With Kilimandscharo Dub & Riddim Society

- Last Flight from Rwanda (Boomslang, 2005)
- Hip to Be Happy (Boomslang, 2008)
- Dance for Peace (Boomslang, 2015)

With Three of a Kind

- Three of a Kind (Minor Music, 1994)
- Drip Some Grease (Minor Music, 1996)
- Meets Mister T. (Minor Music, 1994)

Austrian Syndicate (Helbock, Madsen, Pirker, Preuschl, Spieler)

- Austrian Syndicate (ACT Music, 2023)

=== As sideman ===
With Fred Ho

- The Underground Railroad to My Heart (Soul Note, 1994)
- Turn Pain into Power! (OODiscs, 1997)
- Yes Means Yes, No Means No, Whatever She Wears, Wherever She Goes! (Koch, 1998)

With Mario Pavone

- Song for (Septet) (New World/CounterCurrents, 1994)
- Dancers Tales (Knitting Factory, 1997)
- Remembering Thomas (Knitting Factory, 1999)
- Motion Poetry (Playscape, 2000)
- Totem Blues (Knitting Factory, 2000)
- Op.Ed (Playscape, 2001)
- Mythos (Playscape, 2002)
- Orange (Playscape, 2003)
- Boom (Playscape, 2004)
- Deez to Blues (Playscape, 2006)
- Ancestors (Playscape, 2008)
- Arc Suite (Playscape, 2010)
- Street Songs (Playscape, 2014)

With Fred Wesley

- Amalgamation (Minor Music, 1994)
- Comme Ci Comme Ca (Minor Music, 1991)
- Full Circle (Victor, 1998)
- Studio Live Session (LoEnd, 2018)
- Swing & Be Funky (Minor Music, 1993)
- With a Little Help from My Friends (BHM, 2010)

With Carla White

- Andruline (Stash, 1984)
- Orient Express (Milestone, 1987)
- Mood Swings (Milestone, 1988)
- Listen Here (Evidence, 1995)
- The Sweetest Sounds (DIW, 2000)

With others

- Thomas Chapin, You Don't Know Me (Arabesque, 1995)
- Thomas Chapin, Never Let Me Go (Playscape, 2012)
- Franklin Kiermyer, Break Down the Walls (Konnex, 1992)
- Amy London, Bridges (FiveCut, 2014)
