= Atlantis Quartet =

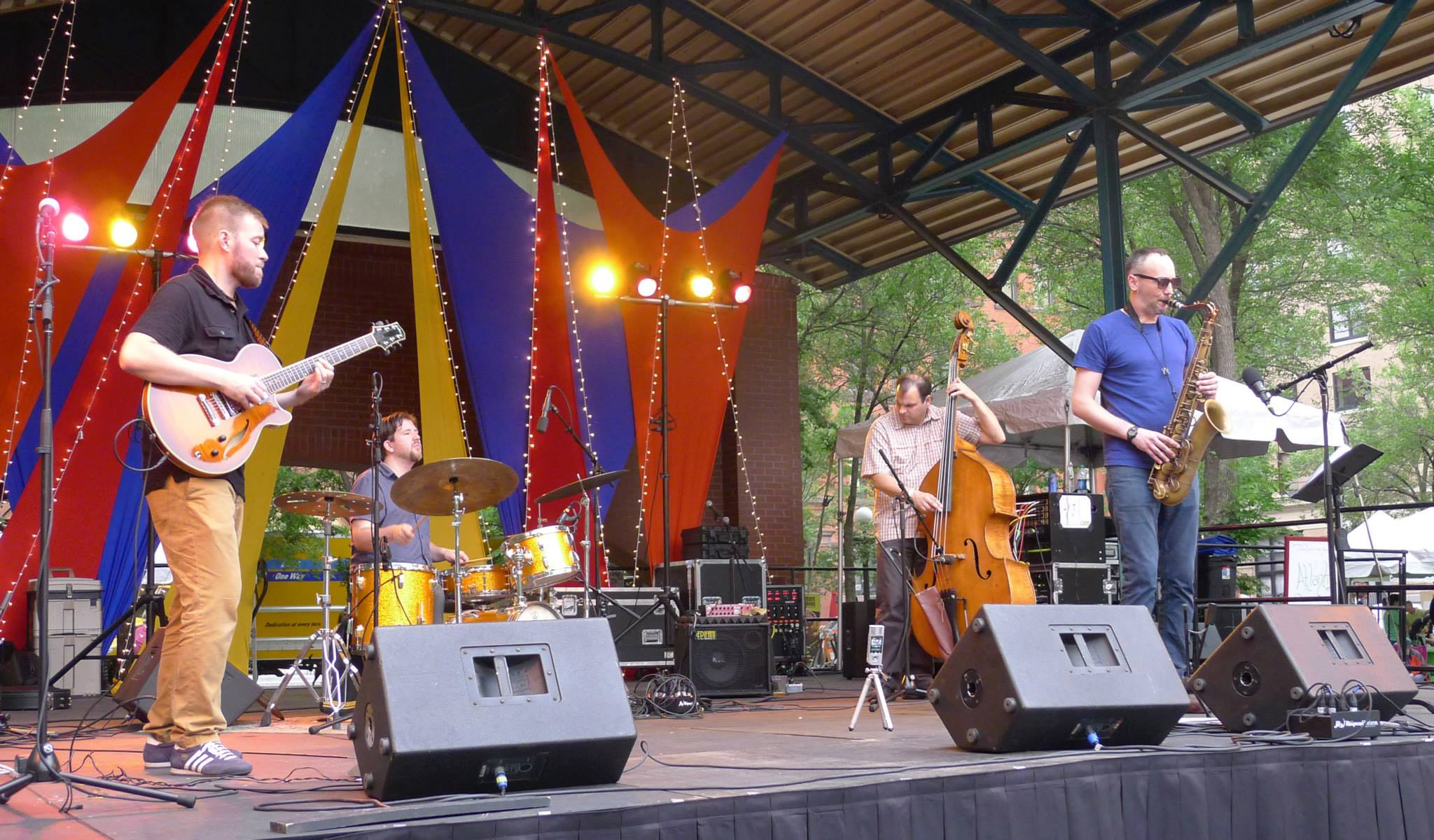
- On the main stage at the Twin Cities Jazz Festival, 2014.

Background information
- Origin: Minneapolis
- Genres: Jazz, post-bop, jazz fusion
- Years active: 2006–present
- Label: Shifting Paradigm
- Members: Brandon Wozniak; Zacc Harris; Chris Bates; Pete Hennig
- Past members: Travis Schilling
- Website: atlantisquartet.com

The Atlantis Quartet is a musical group established in 2006 in Minneapolis, Minnesota.

== History ==
The Atlantis Quartet was formed in the Twin Cities, Minnesota, after guitarist Zacc Harris moved from Southern Illinois to Minneapolis in 2005 and met drummer Pete Hennnig while playing in an R&B band led by John Starkey. After working briefly as a quintet with a pianist, the group solidified their lineup with reed player Brandon Wozniak and bassist Chris Bates (who replaced Travis Schilling in 2008). They performed regularly at the Artists' Quarter and Clown Lounge, toured throughout the midwest (including gigs at The Jazz Showcase and The Dakota), and performed at the Twin Cities Jazz Festival, the Iowa City Jazz Festival, as well as three clubs (L.I.C. Bar, Puppets Jazz Bar, and Miles Cafe) in New York City in 2011. The group recorded a live performance at Icehouse in Minneapolis on November 24, 2014 for a planned future release. Although their records have focused on original compositions by all four members, from 2008 to 2011 the quartet performed annual Halloween shows in which they interpreted other artists' albums, including The Bridge, Head Hunters, A Love Supreme, and Houses of the Holy.

== Style and reception ==
On Atlantis Quartet's debut album, Again, Too Soon, All About Jazz reported that they "create an aura of musical textures that sound as fresh and relevant as they did in Miles Davis' heyday" and while "they're all talented songwriters, attacking their compositions with utmost earnestness...they sound as if they're just having fun." In a review of their second album, Animal Progress, JazzTimes critic Bill Milkowski called the Atlantis Quartet "modern jazz renegades" who "shift nimbly from a punk-jazz aesthetic to ECM-ish sensitivity." Regarding the same album, City Pages writer Rick Mason described "a signature Atlantis sound that taps historic elements like swing, bop, and free jazz while referencing contemporary bits of funk, rock, and world music, then rolls it all into a cohesive bundle of kinetic energy with the visceral allure of intense fireworks and the intellectual challenge of multilayered complexity." Of their fourth album, Expansion, MPR's David Cazares wrote that they "deliver rapid-fire licks in complex rhythms and changing tempos, much like the best jazz-rock ensembles of the 1970s."

== Awards ==
McKnight Fellowship for Performing Musicians, 2015
Star Tribune, Best of Minnesota, 2012
City Pages, Best Jazz Artist in Minnesota, 2011
City Pages, Top 10 Minnesota Albums, 2011
Minnesota Emerging Composers Award, 2010 (Pete Hennig)

== Discography ==
=== Studio albums ===
- Again, Too Soon (Self-released, 2007)
- Animal Progress (Self-released, 2010)
- Expansion (Shifting Paradigm, 2013)
- Hello Human (Shifting Paradigm, 2018)

=== Live albums ===
- Lines in the Sand (Self-released, 2011) recorded live at the Artists' Quarter
- Live at Berlin (Shifting Paradigm, 2025) recorded live at Berlin

=== Compilations ===
- x (Shifting Paradigm, 2016) digital-only release of complete recordings 2006-2016, with bonus tracks
