= Chris Bates =

American jazz bassist

Chris Bates is an American jazz bassist. He started studying upright bass in the 4th grade, and he attended the University of Wisconsin-Eau Claire. He studied with James Clute of the Minnesota Orchestra and jazz bassist Anthony Cox. Beyond his work with jazz, Bates performs in reggae, funk, country, folk and classical styles. He has performed with several notable musicians including Mose Allison, Lee Konitz, Joe Lovano, Steven Bernstein, Howard Levy, Ira Sullivan, Eric Alexander, Tim Sparks and Dean Magraw. Bates was a member of the Motion Poets, formed in 1993, which "released three albums to wide critical acclaim." He received a McKnight Composers Fellowship for his compositions in 1999 and has performed on over 30 albums. Bates' first album as leader was released in 2012.

== Discography ==
=== As leader ===
- New Hope (Technecore, 2012) with Brandon Wozniak, Chris Thomson, Zack Lozier, JT Bates
- Good Vibes Trio (Technecore, 2014) with Dave Hagedorn and Phil Hey

=== As sideman ===
With Atlantis Quartet

- Again, Too Soon (2007)
- Animal Progress (2009)
- Lines in the Sand (2011) recorded live at the Artists' Quarter
- Expansion (2013)
- Hello Human (2018)
- Live at Berlin (2025)

With Kelly Rossum

- Line (612 Sides, 2006)
- Family (612 Sides, 2008)
- Blue Earth County (612 Sides 2016)

With Motion Poets

- Truth And Consequence (IGMOD, 1995)
- Standard of Living (IGMOD, 1997)
- Cruisin' USA (1998) live recordings 1997-1998
- Lose Your Mind and Come to Your Senses (IGMOD, 1999)

With others

- Blue Skies - Peg Carrothers (Bridge Boy, 2001)
- SolidLiquid - Dave Hagedorn (Artegra, 2003)
- Live at the Dakota - Claudia Schmidt (Independent, 2006)
- The Return of Slide Huxtable - Slide Huxtable (CDBY, 2007)
- Leaving Kansas - Holly Long (Skim Milk Productions, 2008)
- Chance, Love, Logic - Ellen Lease/Pat Moriarty Quintet (Innova, 2008)
- Space Dust - Dean Magraw's Red Planet (GoneJazz, 2009)
- Framework - Framework (GoneJazz, 2009)
- Ephemeral Eon - Luke Redfield (Dream Song, 2010)
- Charades - Matt Latterell (2010)
- Queen of the Devil's Rodeo - Jezebel Jones & Her Wicked Ways (2011)
- Deep Purple Dreams - Paula Lammers (Nightingale Jazz, 2011)
- Mighty Bird - The Hope Tonic (2011)
- Blue Door - Tony Hymas & The Bates Brothers (Nato, 2012)
- No October - Dave Olson (2012)
- The Garden - Zacc Harris Group (Shifting Paradigm, 2012)
- Pushing Chain - Pushing Chain (Kingswood, 2014)
- Tall Tales - Dean Granros (Shifting Paradigm, 2015)
- Icehouse and Elsewhere - Fall of the House of Usher (Ecstatomatic, 2015)
- Awakenings - Trent Baarspul (2016)
- Welcome to the Valley - Leisure Valley (BDThorntunes, 2016)
- Inventions & Dimensions - Wabi Sabi (Technecore, 2016)
- Big Alpaca - Bill Simenson Orchestra (2017)
- Red Planet with Bill Carrothers - Red Planet w/ Bill Carrothers (Shifting Paradigm, 2017)
- Mysterious Thelonious - Laura Caviani Trio (2017)
- Confluence - Laura Caviani Trio (2017)
