= A Night in the Life =

Live album by Frank Morgan
- Released: April 24, 2007
- Recorded: November 28–30, 2003
- Venue: Jazz Standard, NYC
- Genre: Jazz
- Length: 52:05
- Label: HighNote; HCD 7164
- Producer: Reggie Marshall, Randall Funke

Frank Morgan chronology
Reflections (2006)	A Night in the Life (2007)	Twogether (2010)

A Night in the Life (subtitled Live at the Jazz Standard Vol. 3) is a live album by saxophonist Frank Morgan which was recorded at the Jazz Standard in 2003 and released on the HighNote label in 2007.

== Reception ==
Professional ratings
Review scores
Source	Rating
AllMusic	4/5 stars
All About Jazz	4/5 stars

The review by AllMusic's Michael G. Nastos said: "Frank Morgan's final release while still alive stands as a testament to his gentle, unassuming soul, his fluid drive playing the bop music born from the seeds and stems germinated by Charlie Parker, and his ability to touch a live audience with music".

All About Jazz reviewer John Barron stated "It would be too convenient to write off A Night in the Life as just another blowing session with predictable results. What makes this set worthwhile, as well as the previously released City Nights: Live at the Jazz Standard, Volume 1 and Raising the Standard: Live at the Jazz Standard, Volume 2, is the uninhibited passion of an authentic master bearing his soul to an audience who is appreciative of the lyrical offerings being captured".

In JazzTimes, Owen Cordle noted "If you think you’ve heard these half-dozen bebop standards too many times before, reconnect via Frank Morgan’s jubilant alto saxophone expression, nimble lines and personal approach to the changes. There are lessons to be learned throughout this 2003 set at the Jazz Standard".

== Track listing ==
1. "Confirmation" (Charlie Parker) – 9:26
2. "On Green Dolphin Street" (Bronisław Kaper, Ned Washington) – 9:25
3. "Half Nelson" (Miles Davis) – 10:10
4. "Hot House" (Tadd Dameron) – 9:15
5. "Billie's Bounce" (Parker) – 7:40
6. "It's Only a Paper Moon" (Harold Arlen, Yip Harburg, Billy Rose) – 6:09

== Personnel ==
=== Performance ===
- Frank Morgan – alto saxophone
- George Cables – piano
- Curtis Lundy – bass
- Billy Hart – drums

=== Production ===
- Reggie Marshall, Randall Funke – producer
- Randall Funke – engineer
