= Jazz Standard (jazz club) =

Former jazz club in New York City

- Interactive map of Jazz Standard
- Address: 116 East 27th Street
- Location: New York City
- Coordinates: 40.7422°N 73.9838°W
- Owner: Danny Meyer
- Capacity: 150
- Type: jazz club
- Event: music
- Public transit: Subway: trains at 28th Street

Construction
- Opened: October 14, 1997
- Closed: December 2, 2020

Website
- www.jazzstandard.com

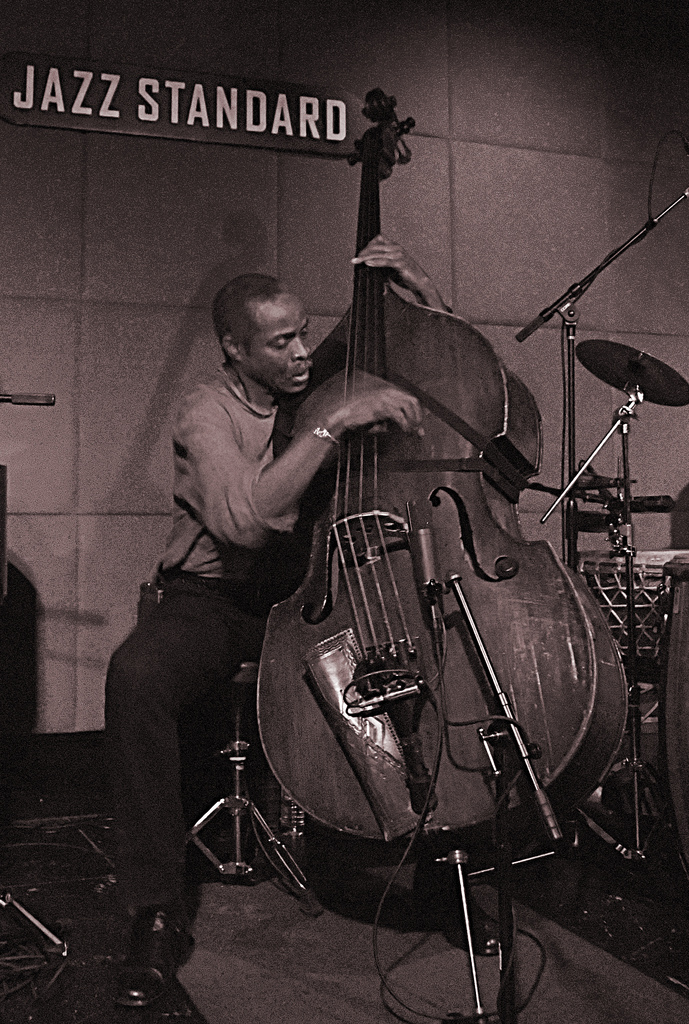
Bassist Alex Blake on stage at Jazz Standard in 2007.

Jazz Standard was a jazz club located at 116 East 27th Street in the Rose Hill neighborhood of Manhattan, New York City. It frequently hosted well-known bands and musicians. The club was owned by restaurateur Danny Meyer and was located in the basement of one of his Blue Smoke restaurants.

The magazine New York listed the club as a "top 5 jazz joint". The New York City Jazz Record named Jazz Standard the "venue of the year" 2017.

== History ==
When the club opened in the fall of 1997 the upstairs restaurant was called "Standard".

The Mingus Big Band, the Mingus Orchestra, and Mingus Dynasty rotated every Monday night as the club's de facto house bands. The former won the 2011 Grammy Award for Best Large Jazz Ensemble Album for their album Live at Jazz Standard. The Maria Schneider Orchestra played a week-long gig at the club every Thanksgiving from 2005 to 2019.

On December 2, 2020, the Jazz Standard announced it would be closing its doors at 116 East 27th Street permanently, due to lack of revenue from COVID-19 and stalled rent negotiations.

== Discography ==
- 1998: Gary Bartz Quartet – Live @ The Jazz Standard, Vol. 1: Soulstice (OYO)
- 2000: André Previn with David Finck – Live at the Jazz Standard (Decca)
- 2000: Maria Schneider Orchestra – Days Of Wine And Roses - Live at the Jazz Standard (ArtistShare)
- 2003: Frank Morgan - City Nights: Live at the Jazz Standard, Raising the Standard, A Night in the Life (HighNote)
- 2003: René Marie – Live at Jazz Standard (Maxjazz)
- 2004: Bill Mays Trio – Live at Jazz Standard (Palmetto)
- 2004: The Lonnie Plaxico Group – Live at Jazz Standard (441 Records)
- 2006: Nancy King with Fred Hersch – Live at Jazz Standard (MaxJazz)
- 2006, 2007: Russell Malone − Live at Jazz Standard Vols. 1 & 2 (MaxJazz)
- 2007: Dave Douglas Quintet – Live at the Jazz Standard (Greenleaf)
- 2007, 2008: Dena DeRose – Live at Jazz Standard Vols. 1 & 2 (MaxJazz)
- 2008: Roger Kellaway – Live at the Jazz Standard (IPO)
- 2009: Fred Hersch Pocket Orchestra – Live at Jazz Standard (Sunnyside)
- 2009: Dafnis Prieto, Si o Si Quartet – Live at Jazz Standard NYC (Dafnison Music)
- 2010: Wolfgang Muthspiel & Mick Goodrick – Live at The Jazz Standard (Material)
- 2010: Marian Petrescu Quartet with Andreas Öberg – Thrivin' – Live at Jazz Standard (Resonance)
- 2010: Mingus Big Band – Live at Jazz Standard (Audio & Video Labs)
- 2010: Antonio Sánchez – Live in New York at Jazz Standard (CAM Jazz)
- 2018: Jakob Bro - Bay of Rainbows (ECM)
