= Energy Park, Saint Paul =

Coordinates: 44°58′14″N 93°9′17″W

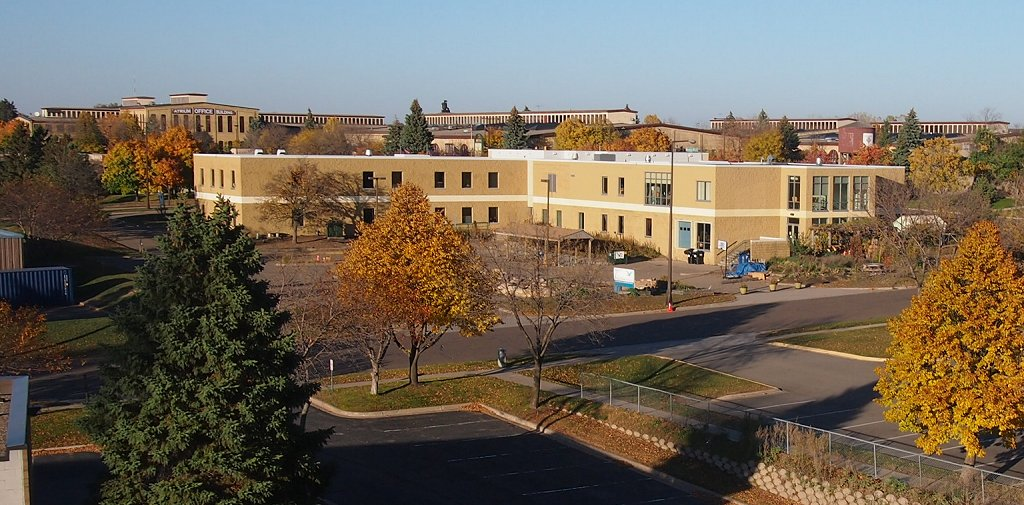
Energy Park from the Hamline Avenue pedestrian bridge

Energy Park is a mixed-use project in the Midway district of Saint Paul, Minnesota. It has industrial, commercial, and residential uses.

The area is bounded by Lexington Parkway on the east, BNSF (formerly Great Northern) railroad tracks on the south, Snelling Avenue on the west, and BNSF (formerly Northern Pacific) tracks on the north.

Planning for energy conversation in the city began after the 1970s energy crisis. In 1980, the project received $12.1 million from the federal government as an Urban Development Action Grants.

By 1989, the first two phases of housing construction were completed. The center would later be turned over to the Saint Paul Port Authority after it lost the Wilder Foundation $9 million.

The Wilder Foundation, a non-profit, contributed to Energy Park's housing and retail development. The foundation invested $35 million in Energy Park retail, housing and office developments.

The Minnesota Children's Museum was located in the neighborhood from 1985 to 1995.

== See also ==
- Bandana Square
