= You Must Believe in Spring =

You Must Believe in Spring may refer to:

- "You Must Believe in Spring", Alan and Marilyn Bergman's relyricization of a Michel Legrand song from 1967 French film The Young Girls of Rochefort
- You Must Believe in Spring (Bill Evans album), recorded in 1977 and released in 1980
- You Must Believe in Spring (Frank Morgan album), 1992
