= Quiet Fire (Frank Morgan and Bud Shank album) =

Live album by Frank Morgan Bud Shank Quintet
- Released: 1991
- Recorded: March 26–28, 1987
- Venue: The Jazz Alley, Seattle WA
- Genre: Jazz
- Length: 60:06
- Label: Contemporary; C-14064
- Producer: Eric Miller for Richard Bock Productions

Frank Morgan chronology
Bebop Lives! (1987)	Quiet Fire (1991)	Major Changes (1987)

Bud Shank chronology
Serious Swingers (1987)	Quiet Fire (1987)	Tomorrow's Rainbow (1988)

Quiet Fire is a live album by saxophonists Frank Morgan and Bud Shank which was recorded in Seattle in 1987 but not released on the Contemporary label until 1991.

== Reception ==
Professional ratings
Review scores
Source	Rating
AllMusic	4/5 stars

The review by Richard S. Ginell for AllMusic stated: "At one time, there would have been a yawning stylistic gap -- indeed, a Grand Canyon -- between alto players Frank Morgan and Bud Shank. But by the time they finally collided head on at Seattle's Jazz Alley, they were perfectly compatible, as their often fiery live exchanges here graphically prove. It was Shank who had changed the most, having set his sights upon becoming a roaring bebopper upon his move to Washington State the year before this gig ...the presence of a live audience clearly pushes these horns into some exciting, ardent jazz territory". For The Washington Post, Geoffrey Himes wrote: "The tough bop aggression of this recording will surprise those who are expecting the sensual romanticism of Morgan's last few outings or the cool-jazz that has dominated most of Shank's career. ... Despite their parallel histories, the two men had never met before the weekend, and this duet allows us to eavesdrop on them feeling each other out for the first time".

== Track listing ==
1. "Solar" (Miles Davis) – 7:13
2. "Phantom's Progress" (George Cables) – 6:14
3. "Quiet Fire" (Cables) – 9:47
4. "Emily" (Johnny Mandel, Johnny Mercer) – 6:45
5. "What's New?" (Bob Haggart, Johnny Burke) – 6:20
6. "The Night Has a Thousand Eyes" (Jerry Brainin, Buddy Bernier) – 9:40

== Personnel ==
=== Performance ===
- Frank Morgan, Bud Shank – alto saxophone
- George Cables – piano
- John Heard – bass
- Jimmy Cobb – drums

=== Production ===
- Eric Miller – producer
- Scott Charles – engineer
