= Love, Lost & Found =

Studio album by Frank Morgan
- Released: 1995
- Recorded: March 7–9, 1995
- Studio: Clinton Recording Studios, NYC
- Genre: Jazz
- Length: 62:55
- Label: Telarc; CD-83374
- Producer: John Snyder

Frank Morgan chronology
Listen to the Dawn (1994)	Love, Lost & Found (1995)	Bop! (1997)

Love, Lost & Found is an album by saxophonist Frank Morgan recorded in 1995 and released on the Telarc label.

== Reception ==
Professional ratings
Review scores
Source	Rating
AllMusic	4/5 stars
The Penguin Guide to Jazz Recordings	3/4 stars

The review by AllMusic's Alex Henderson said: "Those who had been following Morgan's career knew that he was a magnificent ballad player, and ballads are a very high priority on this CD. Most of the standards that he embraces had been recorded time and time again over the years ... It's best for musicians to stay away from such warhorses unless they have something really personal to bring to them, and thankfully, Morgan does. Though it doesn't offer a lot of surprises, Love, Lost and Found is a rewarding disc that admirers of Morgan's more romantic playing will appreciate."

== Track listing ==
1. "The Nearness of You" (Hoagy Carmichael, Ned Washington) – 7:52
2. "Last Night When We Were Young" (Harold Arlen, Yip Harburg) – 5:06
3. "What Is This Thing Called Love?" (Cole Porter) – 5:52
4. "Skylark" (Carmichael, Johnny Mercer) – 4:50
5. "Once I Loved" (Antônio Carlos Jobim, Vinícius de Moraes, Ray Gilbert) – 7:47
6. "I Can't Get Started" (Vernon Duke, Ira Gershwin) – 4:59
7. "It's Only a Paper Moon" (Arlen, Harburg, Billy Rose) – 4:32
8. "My One and Only Love" (Guy Wood, Robert Mellin) – 5:33
9. "Someday My Prince Will Come" (Frank Churchill, Larry Morey) – 4:46
10. "All the Things You Are" (Jerome Kern, Oscar Hammerstein II) – 5:10
11. "Don't Blame Me" (Jimmy McHugh, Dorothy Fields) – 6:28

== Personnel ==
=== Performance ===
- Frank Morgan – alto saxophone
- Cedar Walton – piano
- Ray Brown – bass
- Billy Higgins – drums

=== Production ===
- John Snyder – producer
- Michael Bishop – engineer
