= Twogether (John Hicks and Frank Morgan album) =

Live album / Studio album by John Hicks, Frank Morgan
- Released: 2010
- Recorded: November 2005; 2006
- Venue: The Jazz Bakery, Los Angeles, CA
- Studio: New Hope, Pennsylvania
- Genre: Jazz
- Length: 57:19
- Label: HighNote
- Producer: Elise Wood-Hicks

John Hicks chronology
Besame Mucho (2003)	Twogether (2005–06)	On the Wings of an Eagle (2006)

Frank Morgan chronology
A Night in the Life (2007)	Twogether (2010)	Montreal Memories (2018)

Twogether is an album by pianist John Hicks and alto saxophonist Frank Morgan. It was released by HighNote Records.

== Recording and music ==
The three piano solo tracks were recorded in New Hope, Pennsylvania, in 2006. The four duet tracks were recorded at The Jazz Bakery, Los Angeles, in November 2005.

== Release ==
Twogether was released by HighNote Records. Both musicians died shortly after the recordings: Hicks in May 2006 and Morgan in December 2007.

== Reception ==
Professional ratings
Review scores
Source	Rating
AllMusic	3.5/5 stars

The AllMusic reviewer commented that "Whether Morgan saw his role at the gig as second banana or Hicks just had the more dominant stage presence, Morgan's reticence to make this an equal partnership shows as he holds himself back from engaging fully as a duet partner. Twogether is a pretty, relaxed set of music, but one wonders what might have been if both parties had been willing and able to go all out.

== Track listing ==
1. "Parisian Thoroughfare"
2. "Night in Tunisia"
3. "My One and Only Love"
4. "Is That So?"
5. "Round Midnight"
6. "N.Y. Theme"
7. "Passion Flower"

== Personnel ==
- John Hicks – piano
- Frank Morgan – alto sax (tracks 2, 3, 5, 6)
