= Bop! =

Studio album by Frank Morgan
- Released: 1997
- Recorded: August 19–21, 1996
- Studio: Clinton Recording Studios, NYC
- Genre: Jazz
- Length: 67:08
- Label: Telarc; CD-83413
- Producer: John Snyder

Frank Morgan chronology
Love, Lost & Found (1995)	Bop! (1997)	City Nights: Live at the Jazz Standard (2004)

Bop! is an album by saxophonist Frank Morgan released in 1997 on the Telarc label.

== Reception ==
Professional ratings
Review scores
Source	Rating
AllMusic	4/5 stars
The Penguin Guide to Jazz Recordings	3/4 stars

The review by AllMusic's Scott Yanow said: "Although all eight selections on this CD have been played many times before, altoist Frank Morgan makes each of the pieces sound fresh. ... A fine effort".

JazzTimes's Willard Jenkins noted "By no means a frenzied, pot-boiling affair, Morgan takes the time to nurse the nuances of the music. This is a very relaxed-though far from somnambulant-date befitting a man of Morgan’s astute bop immersion. His alto tone is relaxed and confident, and he addresses these lines as if born to them".

== Track listing ==
1. "Milano" (John Lewis) – 6:06
2. "Well, You Needn't" (Thelonious Monk) – 6:18
3. "K.C. Blues" (Charlie Parker) – 9:10
4. "A Night in Tunisia" (Dizzy Gillespie, Frank Paparelli) – 7:56
5. "Blue Monk" (Monk) – 5:07
6. "Half Nelson" (Miles Davis) – 11:21
7. "Lover Man" (Jimmy Davis, Ram Ramirez, James Sherman) – 11:21
8. "52nd Street Theme" (Monk) – 9:49

== Personnel ==
=== Performance ===
- Frank Morgan – alto saxophone
- Rodney Kendrick – piano
- Curtis Lundy (tracks 1–7), Ray Drummond (track 8) – bass
- Leroy Williams – drums

=== Production ===
- John Snyder – producer
