= Double Image (album) =

Studio album by Frank Morgan and George Cables
- Released: 1987
- Recorded: May 21–22, 1986
- Studio: Monterey Sound Studio, Glendale, CA
- Genre: Jazz
- Length: 48:10
- Label: Contemporary; C 14035
- Producer: Richard Bock

Frank Morgan chronology
| Lament (1986) | Double Image (1987) | Bebop Lives! (1987) |

George Cables chronology
| Circle (1985) | Double Image (1986) | By George (1987) |

Double Image is an album of duets by saxophonist Frank Morgan and pianist George Cables recorded in 1986 and originally released on the Contemporary label.

== Reception ==
Professional ratings
Review scores
| Source | Rating |
|---|---|
| Allmusic | 4/5 stars |

Scott Yanow of Allmusic said "Most of the material is of fairly recent vintage, but even the two potential warhorses ("All the Things You Are" and "After You've Gone") sound fresh and new in this sparse yet very complete setting".

== Track listing ==
1. "All the Things You Are" (Jerome Kern, Oscar Hammerstein II) – 5:09
2. "Virgo" (Wayne Shorter) – 5:58
3. "Blues for Rosalinda" (Frank Morgan) – 5:51
4. "After You've Gone" (Turner Layton, Henry Creamer) – 5:11
5. "Helen's Song" (George Cables) – 6:47
6. "Love Dance" (Ivan Lins, Gilson Peranzzetta, Paul Williams) – 3:53
7. "(Where Do I Begin?) Love Story" (Francis Lai, Carl Sigman) – 8:16
8. "I Told You So" (George Cables) – 4:34
9. "Blue in Green (Miles Davis) – 2:31 Bonus track on CD re-issue

== Personnel ==
- Frank Morgan – alto saxophone
- George Cables – piano
