= Twin City Model Railroad Museum =

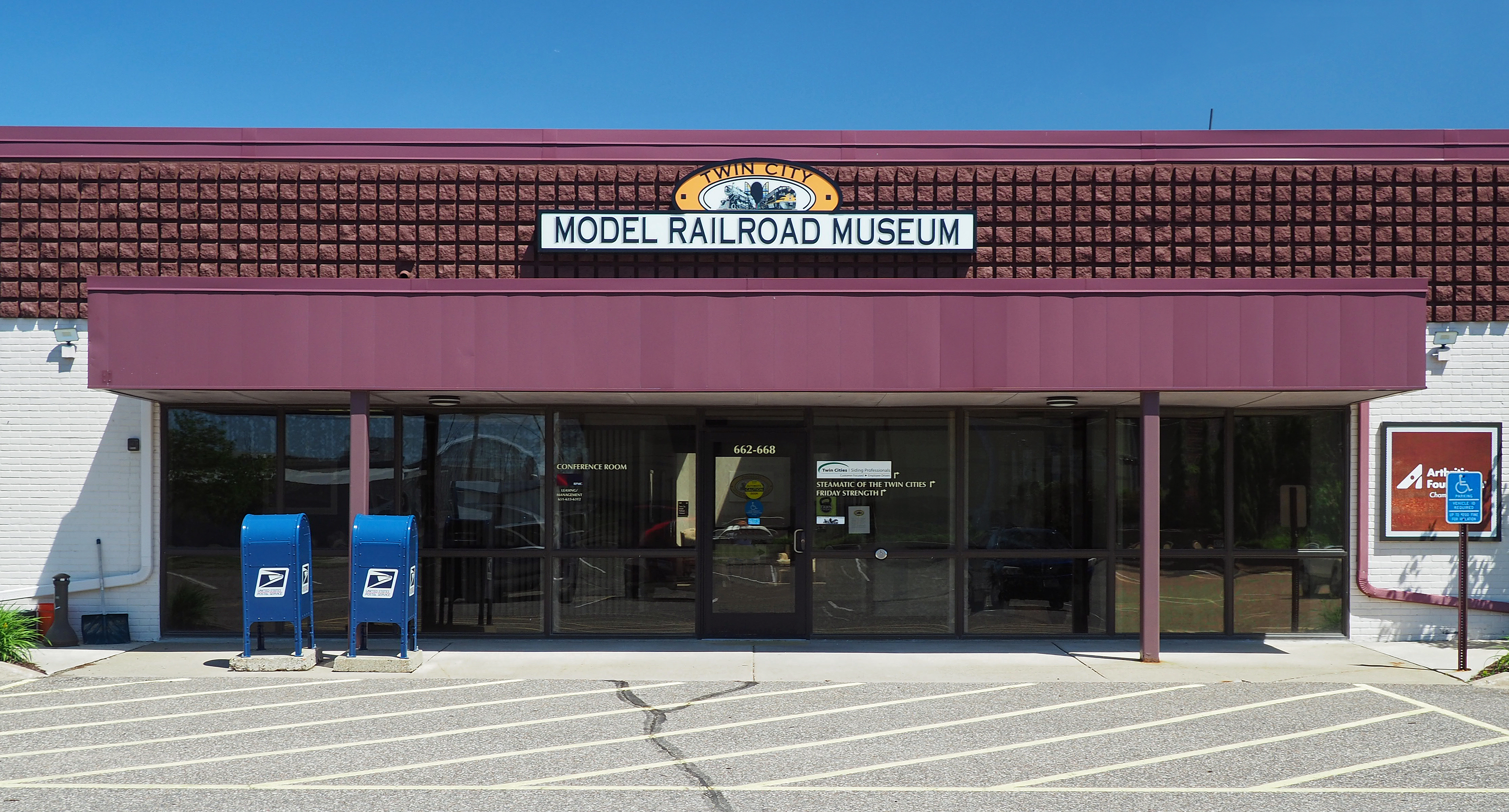
- Exterior entrance of the Twin City Model Railroad Museum
- Established: 1934
- Location: 668 Transfer Road, Suite 8. Saint Paul, Minnesota
- Coordinates: 44°57′39″N 93°11′7″W
- Type: Model Railroad Museum
- Visitors: 24,000+
- President: Dr. Peter Southard
- Curator: Paul Jones
- Website: http://www.tcmrm.org

The Twin City Model Railroad Museum is a railroad museum in Saint Paul, Minnesota, United States, which has a large display of model railroads, and hosts special events like hobby shows, holiday events and more.

== Overview ==
The museum has had a home in Saint Paul since 1934, where it first started as a club. In later years the museum established a home in the Saint Paul Union Depot where it remained till its last day of operations on September 26, 1978, when the depot was shut down. The museum's next home was Bandana Square, a former Northern Pacific railcar repair facility that was being redeveloped as a mall. The museum members started building a new O-Scale layout in the space. In 2009, museum volunteers opened the Toy Train Division in the adjacent Chimneys Building which featured an ever-changing set of toy trains in various other scales. On October 16, 2015, the museum announced that it was looking for a new home. The museum subsequently announced it would be moving to a new location in spring of 2016. The museum reopened on May 17, 2016, in their new location at 668 Transfer Road, Suite 8. The new location is just south of the former Amtrak Midway Depot along the Minnesota Commercial railyard.

The museum's most popular event is Night Trains® which began on November 30, 1996. This event features the layout buildings, streetlamps and train cars lit up with only theatrical lighting overhead, creating a holiday vibe which is highly attended. Special events during the Night Train season, held November through February, include Santa visits, live music, guest layouts and more.

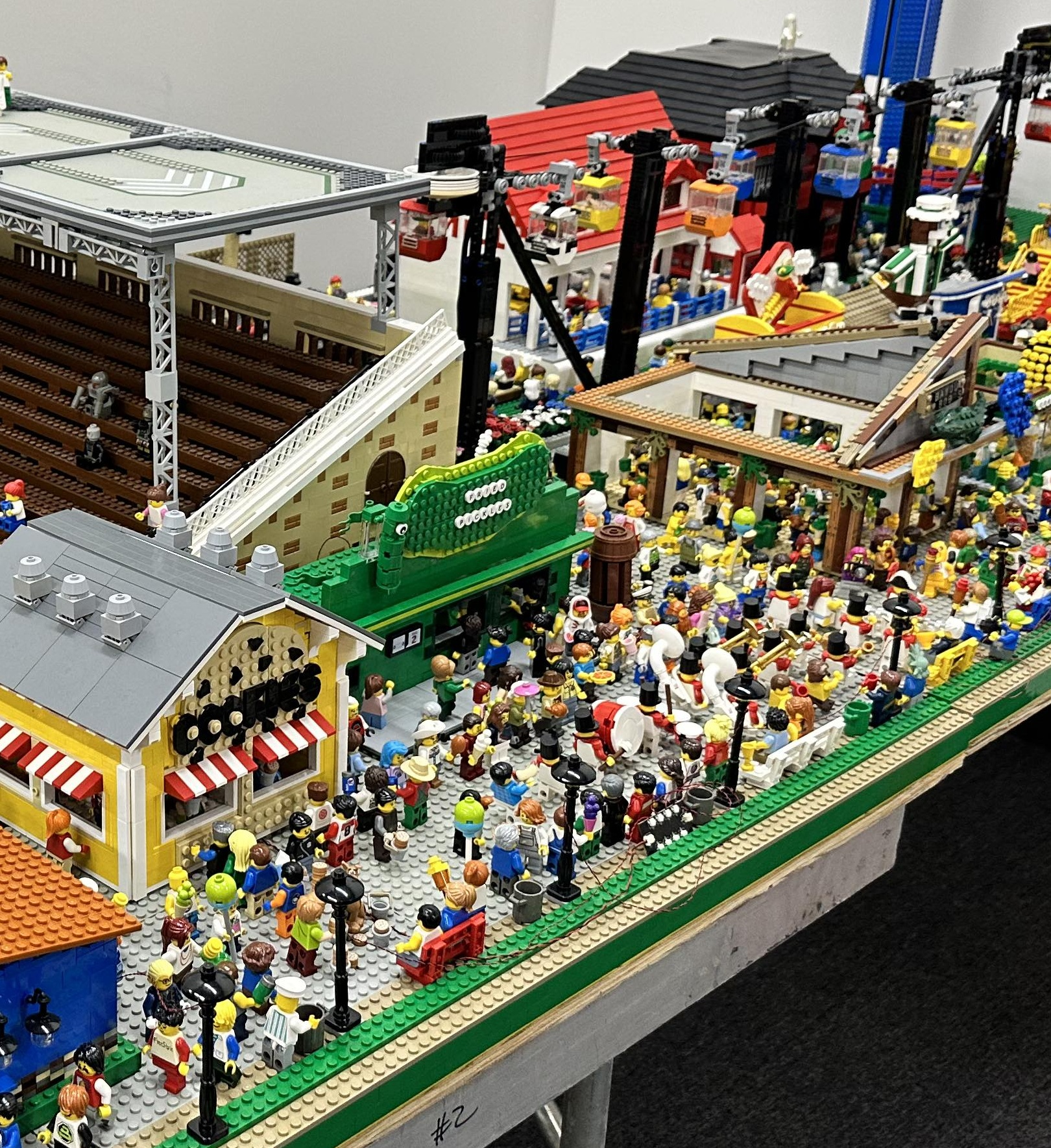
LEGO State Fair Display at the Twin City Model Railroad Museum

Additional special events throughout the year include hobby sales, circus trains, military trains, Halloween events and more.

The museum went through an expansion during the pandemic that allowed it to start offering birthday parties in a newly expanded space. The space also includes additional train layouts in the "Mini-Sota" gallery, a work area, storage, offices and break room for volunteers. This expansion brings the square footage of museum display space to nearly 14,000 square feet.

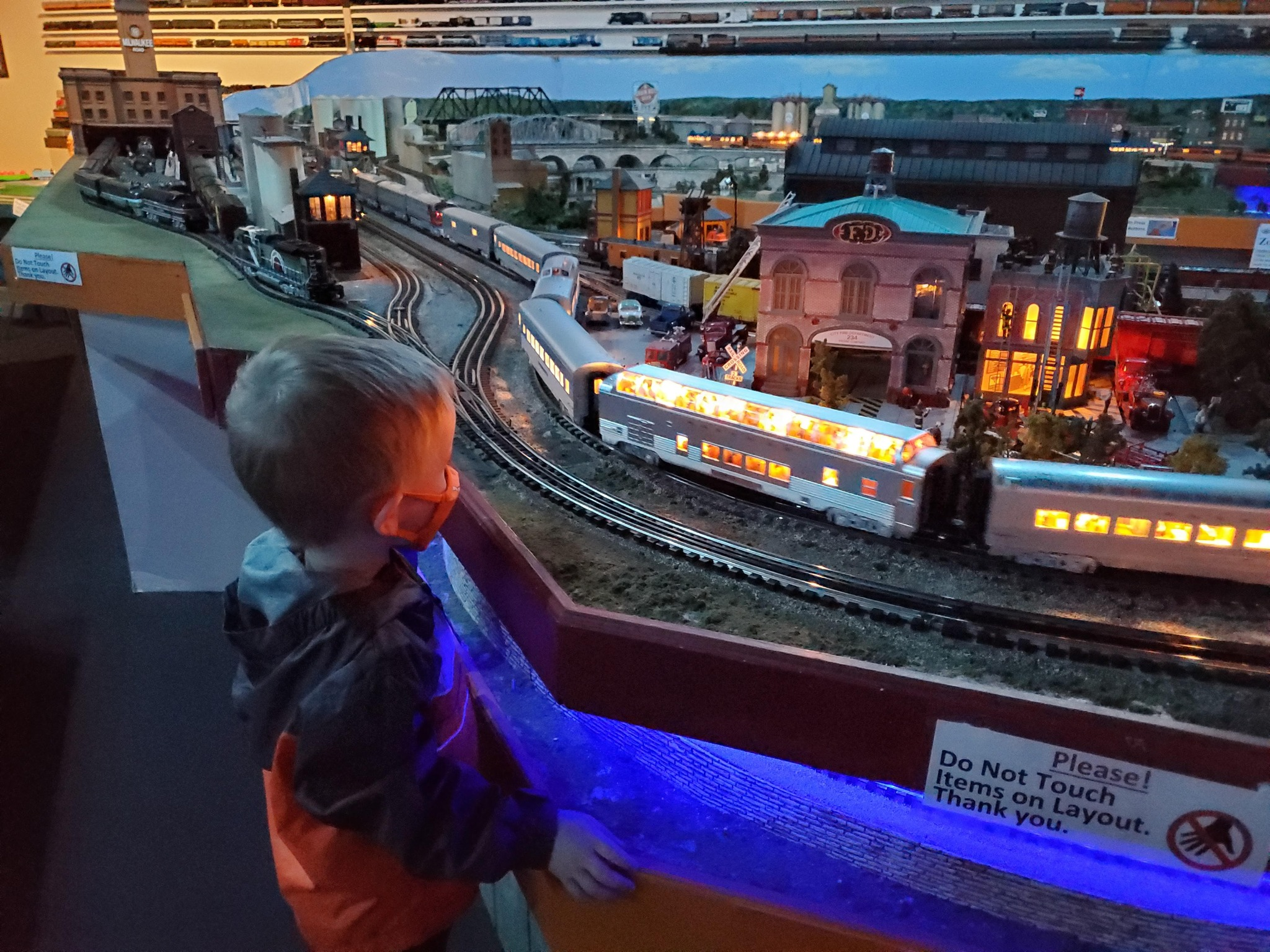
Night Trains Event scene

The museum is typically open Friday-Monday. However, additional special events are held throughout the year.

In 2024, the museum is celebrating its 90th Anniversary with special events throughout the year. The museum had a special logo made to honor the 90th anniversary which harkens back to their original look from the Bandana Square era.
