= Mood Indigo (album) =

Studio album by Frank Morgan
- Released: 1989
- Recorded: June 26–27, 1989
- Studios: RCA Recording Studios, Studio C, New York City
- Genre: Jazz
- Length: 49:03
- Labels: Antilles; 91320
- Producer: John Snyder

Frank Morgan chronology
Central Avenue Reunion (1989)	Mood Indigo (1989)	A Lovesome Thing (1990)

Mood Indigo is an album by saxophonist Frank Morgan which was recorded in 1989 and released on the Antilles label.

== Reception ==
Professional ratings
Review scores
Source	Rating
AllMusic	4.5/5 stars

The review by AllMusic's Scott Yanow said: "Every Morgan recording is well worth picking up (the altoist has been very consistent in the studio), but this one purposely has less mood variation than most and is often a bit melancholy."

== Track listing ==
1. "Lullaby" (George Cables) – 1:29
2. "This Love of Mine" (Hank Sanicola, Sol Parker, Frank Sinatra) – 6:36
3. "In a Sentimental Mood" (Duke Ellington) – 4:18
4. "Bessie's Blues" (John Coltrane) – 8:59
5. "A Moment Alone" (Buster Williams) – 1:46
6. "Mood Indigo" (Ellington) – 5:59
7. "Up Jumped Spring" (Freddie Hubbard) – 4:58
8. "Polka Dots and Moonbeams" (Jimmy Van Heusen, Johnny Burke) – 4:29
9. "We Three Blues" (Frank Morgan) – 6:55
10. "'Round Midnight" (Thelonious Monk) – 6:55
11. "Lullaby" (Cables) – 1:36
12. "Gratitude" (Morgan) – 0:35

== Personnel ==
=== Performance ===
- Frank Morgan – alto saxophone, voice (track 12)
- Wynton Marsalis – trumpet (tracks 4 & 6)
- George Cables (tracks 1, 3, 8, 10 & 11), Ronnie Mathews (tracks 2, 4, 6 & 7) – piano
- Buster Williams (tracks 2, 4–7, 9 & 10) – bass
- Al Foster (tracks 2, 4, 6, 7, 9 & 10) – drums

=== Production ===
- John Snyder – producer
- Joe Lopes – engineer
