= Sweet Love of Mine =

Studio album by John Hicks
- Released: 2006
- Recorded: April 5, 2006
- Studio: Van Gelder Studio, Englewood Cliffs, New Jersey
- Genre: Jazz
- Label: HighNote

John Hicks chronology
I Remember You (2006)	Sweet Love of Mine (2006)

Sweet Love of Mine is an album by pianist John Hicks, recorded in 2006.

== Background ==
The recording session that produced this album was the last of pianist John Hicks' career.

== Recording and music ==
The album was recorded at the Van Gelder Studio, Englewood Cliffs, New Jersey, on April 5, 2006. "One Peaceful Moment", "Sunset Blues", and "The Things We Did Last Summer" are solo piano performances. "I Guess I'll Hang My Tears Out to Dry" is a duet between Hicks and tenor saxophonist Javon Jackson.

== Release ==
Sweet Love of Mine was released by HighNote Records.

== Reception ==
Professional ratings
Review scores
Source	Rating
AllMusic	4.5/5 stars
The Penguin Guide to Jazz	3.5/4 stars

The Penguin Guide to Jazz commented that "There is an elegiac quality to this set that can't simply be explained by the closeness of Hick's own end, even if he was aware of fading health." AllMusic summarized that "This excellent date is a fitting conclusion to John Hicks' career."

== Track listing ==
1. "One Peaceful Moment"
2. "I Guess I'll Hang My Tears Out to Dry"
3. "Sweet Love of Mine"
4. "The Things We Did Last Summer"
5. "Once I Loved"
6. "Hold It Down"
7. "Mambo Influenciado"
8. "I Remember Clifford"
9. "Peanut Butter Two"
10. "Sunset Blues"

== Personnel ==
- John Hicks – piano
- Javon Jackson – tenor sax (tracks 2, 3, 5–9)
- Elise Wood – flute (tracks 3, 7–9)
- Curtis Lundy – bass (tracks 3, 5–9)
- Victor Jones – drums (tracks 3, 5–9)
- Ray Mantilla – percussion (tracks 3, 5, 7, 9)
