= Lament (Frank Morgan album) =

Studio album by Frank Morgan Quartet
- Released: 1986
- Recorded: April 21 & 22, 1986
- Studio: Fantasy Studios, Berkeley, CA
- Genre: Jazz
- Length: 43:16
- Label: Contemporary; C-14021
- Producer: Richard Bock

Frank Morgan chronology
Easy Living (1985)	Lament (1986)	Double Image (1987)

Lament is an album by saxophonist Frank Morgan which was recorded in 1986 and released on the Contemporary label.

== Reception ==
Professional ratings
Review scores
Source	Rating
Allmusic	4/5 stars

The review by Allmusic's Scott Yanow said: "Frank Morgan's comeback (he had gone 30 years between recordings) was a major story in the mid-1980s ... The music is high-quality bop, with Morgan shedding much of his Charlie Parker influence to display his own distinctive sound". In The New York Times, Robert Palmer wrote: "Mr. Morgan's new album Lament lets us know how much we've been missing. ... he plays with burning conviction, and with a fluidity that can be positively dazzling. The six tunes are well-chosen. ... Overall, this is a more impressive album than last year's very fine Easy Living. It seems that at age 53, Frank Morgan's time has finally come".

== Track listing ==
1. "Ceora" (Lee Morgan) – 7:34
2. "Until It's Time for You to Go" (Buffy Sainte-Marie) – 6:05
3. "Perdido" (Juan Tizol) – 7:56
4. "Ana Maria" (Wayne Shorter) – 6:57
5. "Lament" (J. J. Johnson) – 9:17
6. "Half Nelson" (Miles Davis) – 5:17
7. "Thank You Blues" (Frank Morgan) – 8:08 Additional track on CD release

== Personnel ==
=== Performance ===
- Frank Morgan – alto saxophone
- Cedar Walton – piano
- Buster Williams – bass
- Billy Higgins – drums

=== Production ===
- Richard Bock – producer
- Danny Kopelson – engineer
