= Frank Morgan (musician) =

American jazz saxophonist (1933–2007)

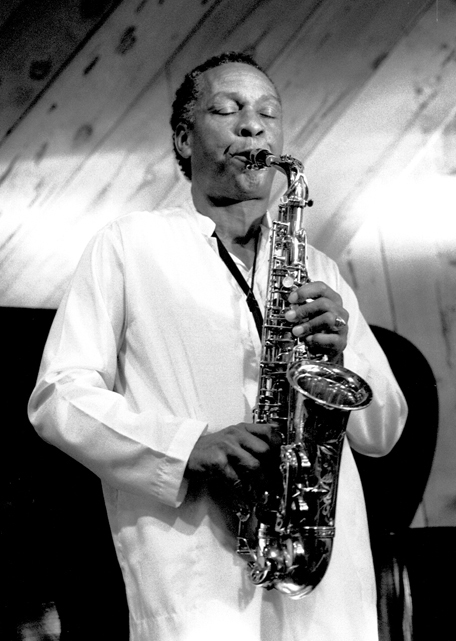
- Morgan in Half Moon Bay, California, 1986

Background information
- Born: December 23, 1933; Minneapolis, Minnesota, U.S.
- Died: December 14, 2007 (aged 73) Minneapolis, Minnesota, U.S.
- Genres: Bebop
- Occupation: Musician
- Instrument: Alto saxophone
- Years active: 1949–2007
- Labels: Contemporary, Telarc, Antilles, HighNote

Frank Morgan (December 23, 1933 – December 14, 2007) was an American jazz saxophonist with a career spanning more than 50 years. He mainly played alto saxophone but also played soprano saxophone. He was known as a Charlie Parker successor who primarily played bebop and ballads.

== Biography ==
=== Early life (1933–1947) ===
Frank Morgan was born in Minneapolis, Minnesota in 1933, but spent most of his childhood living with his grandmother in Milwaukee, Wisconsin while his parents were on tour. Morgan's father Stanley was a guitarist with Harlan Leonard and the Rockets and The Ink Spots. His mother Geraldine was a 14-year-old student when she gave birth to him.

Morgan took up his father's instrument at an early age, but lost interest the moment he saw Charlie Parker take his first solo with the Jay McShann band at the Paradise Theater in Detroit, Michigan. Stanley introduced them backstage, where Parker offered Morgan advice about starting out on the alto saxophone, and they met at a music store the following day. Morgan, seven years old at the time, believed they would be picking out a saxophone, but Parker suggested he start on the clarinet to develop his embouchure.

Morgan practiced and played the clarinet for about two years before acquiring a soprano saxophone, and finally, an alto. He continued to live with his grandmother until about age 14, when she caught him with Marijuana, which was then illegal. She sent him to live with his father (by that time divorced) in Los Angeles, California.

=== Los Angeles (1947–1955) ===
As a teenager, Morgan had opportunities to jam with Dexter Gordon and Wardell Gray on Sunday afternoons at the Crystal Tearoom. When he was 15 years old, Morgan was offered Johnny Hodges's spot in Duke Ellington's Orchestra, but Stanley deemed him too young for touring. Instead, the youth joined the house band at Club Alabam, where he backed vocalists including Billie Holiday and Josephine Baker.

That same year Morgan won a television talent-show contest, the prize of which was a recording session with the Freddy Martin Orchestra, playing "Over the Rainbow" in an arrangement by Ray Conniff, with vocals by Merv Griffin. Morgan attended Jefferson High School during the day, where he played in the school big band that also spawned such jazz musicians as Art Farmer, Ed Thigpen, Chico Hamilton, Sonny Criss, and Dexter Gordon. Morgan stayed in contact with Parker during these years, and was invited to jam sessions at Hollywood celebrities' homes when Parker visited Los Angeles.

In 1952, Morgan earned a spot in Lionel Hampton's band, but his first arrest in 1953 prevented him from joining the Clifford Brown and Max Roach quintet (that role went instead to Harold Land, and later, Sonny Rollins). He made his recording debut on February 20, 1953, with Teddy Charles and his West Coasters in a session for Prestige Records. This sextet featured short-lived tenor player Wardell Gray and was included on the 1983 posthumous release Wardell Gray Memorial Volume 1. On November 1, 1954, Morgan cut five tracks with the Kenny Clarke Sextet for Savoy Records, four of which were released with Clarke billed as the leader, with "I've Lost Your Love" credited to writer Milt Jackson as leader.

Morgan recorded an all-star date with Wild Bill Davis and Conte Candoli on January 29, 1955, and participated in a second recording session on March 31, 1955, with Candoli, Wardell Gray, Leroy Vinnegar and others, which were combined and released in 1955 as Morgan's first album, Frank Morgan, by GNP Crescendo Records. Later releases also included five tracks cut at the Crescendo Club in West Hollywood on August 11, 1956, with a sextet featuring Bobby Timmons and Jack Sheldon. The album copy hailed Morgan as the new Charlie Parker, who had died the same year. In his own words, Morgan was "scared to death" by this and "self-destructed".

=== Addiction and incarceration (1955–1985) ===
Following in the footsteps of Parker, Morgan had started taking heroin at 17. He became addicted, and spent much of his adult life in and out of prison on charges related to his illegal drug abuse. Morgan supported his drug habit through check forgery and fencing stolen property.

His first drug arrest came in 1955, the same year his debut album was released. By 1962, Morgan was incarcerated at San Quentin State Prison in 1962, where he formed a small ensemble with Art Pepper, a sax player and drug addict. His final incarceration, for which Morgan had turned himself in on a parole violation, ended on December 7, 1986.

Morgan stayed off heroin for the last two decades of his life, taking methadone daily.

=== Comeback (1985–2007) ===
Fresh out of prison in April 1985, Morgan started recording again, releasing Easy Living on Contemporary Records that June. Morgan performed at the Monterey Jazz Festival on September 21, 1986, and turned down an offer to play Charlie Parker in Clint Eastwood's film Bird (Forest Whitaker took his place).

He made his New York debut in December 1986 at the Village Vanguard, and collaborated with George W.S. Trow on Prison-Made Tuxedos, a semi-autobiographical Off-Broadway play that included live music by the Frank Morgan Quartet (featuring Ronnie Mathews, Walter Booker, and Victor Lewis). His 1990 album Mood Indigo went to number four on the Billboard jazz chart.

In 1998 Morgan suffered a stroke, but subsequently recovered. He recorded and performed music live during the last nine years of his life.

HighNote Records eventually released three albums-worth of material from a three-night stand at the Jazz Standard in New York City in November 2003. Morgan also participated in the 2004 Charlie Parker Jazz Festival in Tompkins Square Park.

In 2000, Morgan had traveled to Taos, New Mexico, for a two-night engagement. He fell in love with Taos and made it his home for the next five years. Whenever asked, he proudly proclaimed, "My hometown is Taos, New Mexico".

After moving to Minneapolis in late 2005, Morgan headlined the 2006 Twin Cities Hot Summer Jazz Festival and played duets with Ronnie Mathews at the Dakota Jazz Club there. He also played with George Cables at the Artists' Quarter in St. Paul, Minnesota. Morgan also performed on the West Coast at Yoshi's and Catalina's.

His last gig in Minneapolis featured Grace Kelly, Irv Williams, and Peter Schimke at the Dakota on July 1, 2007.

For one of Morgan's final recordings, he composed and recorded music for the audiobook adaptation of Michael Connelly's crime novel The Overlook (2007), providing brief unaccompanied sax solos at the beginning and end of the book, and between chapters. Morgan is mentioned in the book by lead character homicide detective Harry Bosch, a jazz enthusiast.

Shortly before his death, Morgan completed his first tour of Europe.

=== Death ===
Frank Morgan died in Minneapolis on Friday, December 14, 2007, from complications due to colorectal cancer, nine days before his 74th birthday. A memorial service featuring members of Morgan's family and a performance by Irv Williams was held at the Artists' Quarter on Sunday, December 23.

Morgan's ashes are buried in the courtyard of the Historic Taos Inn (Taos, New Mexico), marked by a plaque that reads "Peace & Love. Bebop Lives". Since 2015, his life in Taos has been celebrated each November by the four-day Frank Morgan Taos Jazz Festival.

== Legacy ==
The New York Times editor Peter Keepnews wrote that Frank Morgan was "a leading figure in the jazz revival of the late '80s, a living reminder of bebop's durability". Writing in JazzTimes, David Franklin described Morgan as having a "sweet, singing tone" and praised his "subtle use of dynamic contrast" and "mature self-assuredness" which complemented his "youthful exuberance". The Penguin Guide to Jazz on CD called Morgan "a passionate improviser" who "organizes his solos in a songful, highly logical way". Comparing Morgan and Art Pepper, C. Michael Bailey wrote that "both possessed a beautifully spearmint-dry ice tone in their early careers and both were unsurpassed as ballad interpreters," and that Morgan showed "why bop still matters so much". Author Michael Connelly co-produced a documentary film about Morgan, Sound of Redemption: The Frank Morgan Story, directed by N.C. Heikin, which had its world premiere at the Los Angeles Film Festival on June 14, 2014, and was followed the next day by a tribute concert at The Grammy Museum, featuring George Cables, Ron Carter, Mark Gross, Grace Kelly, and Roy McCurdy.

== Discography ==
=== As leader ===
- Frank Morgan (Gene Norman Presents, 1955)
- Easy Living (Contemporary, 1985)
- Lament (Contemporary, 1986)
- Double Image (Contemporary, 1986)
- Bebop Lives! (Contemporary, 1986)
- Major Changes (Contemporary, 1987)
- Yardbird Suite (Contemporary, 1988)
- Reflections (Contemporary, 1989)
- Mood Indigo (Antilles, 1989)
- A Lovesome Thing (Antilles, 1990)
- Quiet Fire (Contemporary, 1987 [1991]) with Bud Shank
- You Must Believe in Spring (Antilles, 1992)
- Listen to the Dawn (Antilles, 1993)
- Love, Lost & Found (Telarc, 1995)
- Bop! (Telarc, 1996)
- City Nights: Live at the Jazz Standard (HighNote, 2004)
- Raising the Standard (HighNote, 2003 [2005])
- Reflections (HighNote, 2006)
- A Night in the Life (HighNote, 2003 [2007])
- Twogether (HighNote, 2005 [2010]) with John Hicks
- Montreal Memories (HighNote, 1989 [2018]) with George Cables

=== As sideman ===
With Teddy Charles

- Adventures in California (Fresh Sound Records, 1953)

With Kenny Clarke

- Telefunken Blues (Savoy, 1955)

With Art Farmer

- Central Avenue Reunion (Contemporary, 1990)

With Terry Gibbs

- The Latin Connection (Contemporary, 1986)

With Wardell Gray

- Wardell Gray Memorial, Vol. 1 (Prestige, 1983) recorded in 1953

With Milt Jackson

- Meet Milt Jackson (Savoy, 1954)

With Abbey Lincoln

- Who Used to Dance (Verve, 1996 [1997])

With Lyle Murphy

- Four Saxophones in Twelve Tones (GNP/Crescendo, 1955)

With Mark Murphy

- Night Mood (Milestone, 1986)

With Ben Sidran

- Mr. P's Shuffle (Go Jazz, 1996)

With L. Subramaniam

- Fantasy Without Limits (Trend, 1979)
- Conversations (Milestone, 1984)
