= Central Avenue Reunion =

Live album by Art Farmer & Frank Morgan
- Released: 1990
- Recorded: May 26–27, 1989
- Venue: Kimball's East, Emeryville, CA
- Genre: Jazz
- Length: 62:00
- Label: Contemporary; C 14057
- Producer: Helen Keane

Art Farmer chronology
Ph.D. (1989)	Central Avenue Reunion (1990)	Soul Eyes (1990)

Frank Morgan chronology
Reflections (1989)	Central Avenue Reunion (1989)	Mood Indigo (1989)

Central Avenue Reunion is a live album by Art Farmer and Frank Morgan recorded in Emeryville, CA in 1989 and originally released on the Contemporary label.

== Reception ==
Professional ratings
Review scores
Source	Rating
Allmusic	4.5/5 stars
Los Angeles Times	3/4 stars
Penguin Guide to Jazz	3/4 stars

Scott Yanow of Allmusic said "This CD is filled with high-quality bebop that is easily recommended to straight-ahead jazz fans". the Los Angeles Times review observed "this quintet session harks back to the halcyon days of the 1940s Central Avenue scene, when jazz could be heard in countless clubs almost 'round the clock. Trumpeter Farmer and altoist Morgan were bandstand-mates then and they both still embrace the be-bop style: Farmer is a little more true and precise in his improvisations, whereas Morgan likes to let his lines squiggle chaotically on occasion". The Chicago Tribune noted "Trumpeter Art Farmer`s mellow lyrical style fits easily with alto saxophonist Frank Morgan`s plaintive phrasing. The result is charming and satisfying, like an evening with people you like to be with". The Penguin Guide to Jazz awarded the album 3 stars saying it had "A few fine moments amid a generally routine record".

== Track listing ==
1. "Star Eyes" (Gene de Paul, Don Raye) - 8:43
2. "Farmer's Market" (Art Farmer) - 6:58
3. "Embraceable You" (George Gershwin, Ira Gershwin) - 6:48
4. "Blue Minor" (Sonny Clark) - 7:08
5. "I Remember You" (Johnny Mercer, Victor Schertzinger) - 9:03
6. "Don't Blame Me" (Dorothy Fields, Jimmy McHugh) - 5:45
7. "Cool Struttin'" (Clark) - 9:21
8. "Donna Lee" (Charlie Parker) - 6:30 Bonus track on CD

== Personnel ==
- Art Farmer - trumpet, flugelhorn
- Frank Morgan - alto saxophone
- Lou Levy - piano
- Eric Von Essen - bass
- Albert Heath - drums
