= Reflections (2006 Frank Morgan album) =

Studio album by Frank Morgan
- Released: 2006
- Recorded: November 14, 2005
- Studio: Van Gelder Studio, Englewood Cliffs, NJ
- Genre: Jazz
- Length: 52:29
- Label: HighNote; HCD 7154
- Producer: Houston Person, Reggie Marshall

Frank Morgan chronology
Raising the Standard (2005)	Reflections (2006)	A Night in the Life (2007)

Reflections is an album by saxophonist Frank Morgan which was recorded in 2005 and released on the HighNote label the following year.

== Reception ==
Professional ratings
Review scores
Source	Rating
AllMusic	4/5 stars
All About Jazz	4/5 stars
The Guardian	3/5 stars

The review by AllMusic's Scott Yanow said: "Frank Morgan is in a mellow and lyrical mood for this quartet date ... The songs are all familiar ones, eight tunes that mean a lot to the altoist. The tempos range from ballads to a medium pace with Morgan taking his time, creating thoughtful and melodic solos that pay tribute to the melodies, his roots in Charlie Parker bebop, and his own mature style. The result is a set of very nice music, accessible yet full of subtle creativity". All About Jazz reviewer Michael P. Gladstone observed "The rhythm section employed by Morgan on Reflections is perfectly sympatico with the altoist". In JazzTimes, Terry Perkins noted "With the release of Reflections, it appears that Morgan has once again decided to focus on recording. And this strong studio session-recorded in the legendary studios of Rudy Van Gelder-captures Morgan’s lyrical, swinging alto sax sound at its best. ... The rapport between Morgan and his fellow musicians is strong, and the music flows organically throughout. This one’s a winner". The Guardian's John Fordham wrote "He released an album called Reflections in 1989, with Joe Henderson, Bobby Hutcherson and other stars on board. This is a more modest affair and deals with classic jazz materials in a straightahead manner, but it confirms Morgan as a potent force".

== Track listing ==
1. "Walkin'" (Richard Carpenter) – 6:57
2. "Monk's Mood" (Thelonious Monk) – 5:55
3. "I'll Be Around" (Alec Wilder) – 4:51
4. "Love Story" (Francis Lai, Carl Sigman) – 5:29
5. "Solar" (Miles Davis) – 7:33
6. "Blue Monk" (Monk) – 6:19
7. "Crazy He Calls Me" (Carl Sigman, Bob Russell) – 5:24
8. "Out of Nowhere" (Johnny Green, Edward Heyman) – 10:01

== Personnel ==
=== Performance ===
- Frank Morgan – alto saxophone
- Ronnie Mathews – piano
- Essiet Essiet – bass
- Billy Hart – drums

=== Production ===
- Houston Person, Reggie Marshall – producer
- Rudy Van Gelder – engineer
