= On the Wings of an Eagle (album) =

Studio album by John Hicks
- Released: 2006
- Recorded: March 10, 2006
- Studio: St. Peter's Episcopal Church, New York City
- Genre: Jazz
- Label: Chesky

John Hicks chronology
Twogether (2005–06)	On the Wings of an Eagle (2006)	I Remember You (2006)

On the Wings of an Eagle is an album by pianist John Hicks, recorded in 2006.

== Background ==
The album was recorded by the working trio led by pianist John Hicks, with bassist Buster Williams, and drummer Louis Hayes.

== Recording and music ==
The album was recorded at St. Peter's Episcopal Church, New York City, on March 10, 2006. Hicks wrote "As Birds Fly (Walton's Mountain)" as a tribute to pianist Cedar Walton; "Strivers Jewels" and "Christina" were composed by Williams.

== Release ==
On the Wings of an Eagle was released by Chesky Records.

== Reception ==
Professional ratings
Review scores
Source	Rating
AllMusic	4.5/5 stars
The Penguin Guide to Jazz	3/4 stars

The Penguin Guide to Jazz commented that "Hicks died eight weeks after the recording, which lends it a certain poignancy, but even without that association it would be a cracking set."

== Track listing ==
1. "Minority"
2. "Fly Little Bird Fly"
3. "Strivers Jewels"
4. "Balues-Bolivar-Balues-Are"
5. "Cheese Cake"
6. "Dedicated to You"
7. "Minor Mishap"
8. "Christina"
9. "As Birds Fly (Walton's Mountain)"

== Personnel ==
- John Hicks – piano
- Buster Williams – bass
- Louis Hayes – drums
