= Phil Hey =

American jazz drummer (born 1953)

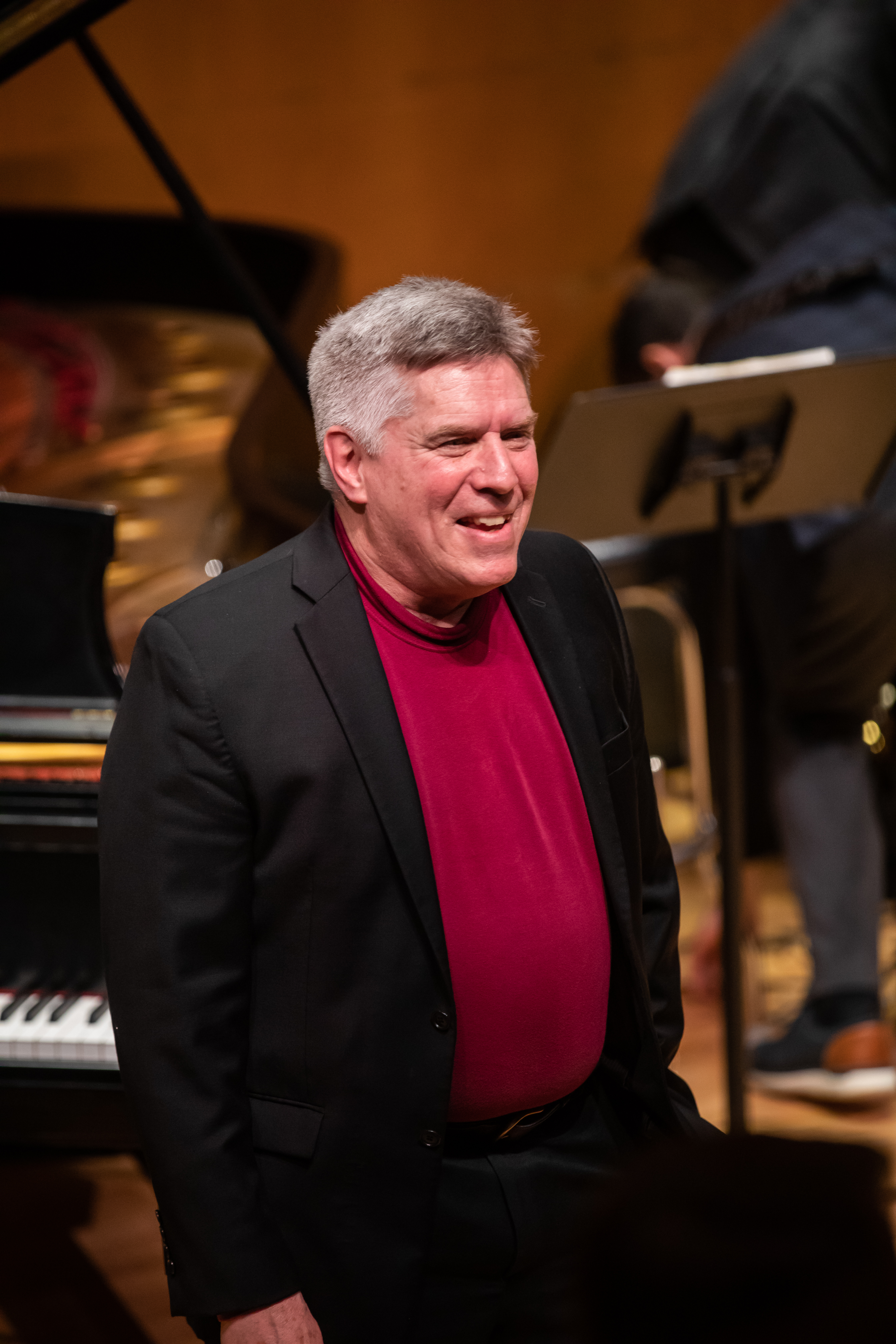

Background information
- Birth name: Philip C. Hey
- Born: May 21, 1953 (age 71); New York City, U.S.
- Genres: Jazz, bebop, hard bop
- Occupation(s): Musician, composer, educator, bandleader
- Instrument(s): Drums, percussion
- Website: www.philhey.com

Phil Hey (born May 21, 1953) is an American jazz drummer. He has worked with Dewey Redman, Jay McShann, Mose Allison, Benny Carter, Charlie Rouse, Harold Land, Charlie Byrd, David "Fathead" Newman, Geoff Keezer, Mark Murphy, Benny Golson, Stacey Kent, and Kenny Barron.

== Biography ==
Born in New York City, Hey grew up in Philadelphia and the St. Paul suburb of Roseville, Minnesota. He started his music study with mentor and legendary jazz drummer Ed Blackwell at the Creative Music Studio in New York in 1975. His relationship with Blackwell continued until Blackwell's death in 1992. He has also studied with Floyd Thompson and Marv Dahlgren, the former principal percussionist of the Minnesota Orchestra. He considers the Beatles and 1960s rock groups early music influences. He also credits his parents and his childhood band instructor for their support and encouragement in pursuing a music career.

Hey performs with several groups and leads the Phil Hey Quartet with Tom Lewis on bass, Dave Hagedorn on vibraphone, and Phil Aaron on piano. The quartet's album Subduction: Live at Artist's Quarter (2005) was named Best Jazz CD of the Year by the Twin Cities alternative weekly newspaper City Pages. City Pages also named him 2006 Jazz Musician of the Year.

His first album, Let Them All Come with Pat Moriarty, was released in 1977 on the small private label Min Records. The cover art by Homer Lambrecht is featured in Freedom, Rhythm, and Sound, a compilation of a jazz album artwork by Gilles Peterson and Stuart Baker. He has appeared on over 125 recordings and remains a first-call musician supporting regional recording artists as well as touring jazz artists. His jazz recordings include Von Freeman's Live at The Dakota, Pete Whitman's X-Tet Where's When?, Tom Hubbard's Tribute to Mingus, and Ed Berger's I'm Glad There is You, all of which received four out of five star ratings by Down Beat magazine reviewers.

In addition to his work as a jazz musician Hey has played regional performances with blues and rock acts, including Nick St. Nicholas, George "Mojo" Buford, and Mississippi Fred McDowell. He has appeared on the soundtrack of the 6th Day (2000) starring Arnold Schwarzenegger and several independent film soundtracks including Been Rich All My Life (2006). In addition, he has played many touring theater productions, including The D.B. Cooper Project, Joseph and the Amazing Technicolor Dreamcoat, and Irving Berlin's I Love a Piano and has performed with comics Bob Hope, Red Skelton, and Don Rickles.

== Educator ==
Hey is a faculty member at the University of Minnesota School of Music where he teaches jazz percussion and directs the jazz ensemble. He is on the music faculty at St. Olaf College and the MacPhail Center for Music. He taught music at Macalester College from 1997 to 2008.

== Equipment ==
Ellis Drum Shop released the Phil Hey Signature Kit, a limited edition six piece shell drum kit with maple shells in 2012.

== Discography ==
=== As leader ===
- 1977 Let Them All Come, with Pat Moriarty
- 2005 Subduction Live at the Artist's Quarter
- 2009 Conflict!, with Kelly Rossum

=== As sideman ===
With Chris Bates

- 2014 Good Vibes Trio

With Ed Berger

- 1999 I'm Glad There Is You

With Terry Lee Burns

- 1997 Freehand

With Laura Caviani

- 1999 Angels We Haven't Heard

With the Cedar Avenue Big Band

- 2002 Land of 10,000 Licks

With Debbie Duncan

- 1993 Live at the Dakota
- 1995 It Must Be Christmas
- 2007 I Thought About You

With Dan Estrem and John Holmquist

- 1988 Bossa
- 1990 Meditation

With Connie Evingson

- 1998 I Have Dreamed
- 1999 Some Cats Know
- 2003 Let It Be Jazz Connie Evingson Sings the Beatles
- 2008 Little Did I Dream
- 2012 Sweet Happy Life

With Von Freeman

- 2001 Live at the Dakota

With Dave Hagedorn

- 2003 Vibes Solidliquid

With Glen Helgeson

- 1995 Spirit of the Wood

With Tom Hubbard

- 1989 Tribute to Mingus

With the JazzMN Orchestra

- 2000 JazzMN Big Band

With Gordon Johnson

- 2005 Trios Version 3.0
- 2008 GJ4
- 2010 Trios No. 5

With Dave Karr and Mulligan Stew

- 2004 Cookin' at the Hot Summer Jazz Festival

With Mary Louise Knutson

- 2001 Call Me When You Get There
- 2011 In the Bubble

With Chris Lomheim

- 2000 The Bridge

With the Minnesota Klezmer Band

- 1998 Bulka's Song

With David Mitchell

- 2000 Young Cats

With Lucia Newell

- 2004 Steeped in Strayhorn

With the O'Neill Brothers

- 2004 On Broadway with the O'Neill Brothers

With the Out to Lunch Quintet

- 2006 Live at the Artist's Quarter

With Preston Reed

- 1991 Halfway Home

With Rio Nido

- 1986 Voicings

With Claudia Schmidt

- 1991 Essential Tension
- 2012 Bend in the River Collected Songs

With Ted Unseth and the Americana Classic Jazz Orchestra

- 2007 20th Anniversary Concert with Benny Waters

With Benny Weinbeck

- 1998 Sweet Love
- 2011 Live at D'Amico Kitchen

With Pete Whitman

- 1998 Departure Point
- 2001 The Sound of Water
- 2003 Where's When?

With Steve Yeager

- 2003 New Groove Blues

== Concert video ==
With Benny Weinbeck Trio

- 2011 – Benny Weinbeck Trio: Live at D'Amico Kitchen (DVD)
