= Listen to the Dawn (Frank Morgan album) =

Studio album by Frank Morgan
- Released: 1994
- Recorded: April 19–20 & November 27, 1993
- Studio: Sear Sound, New York City
- Genre: Jazz
- Length: 52:13
- Label: Antilles; 518 979-2
- Producer: John Snyder

Frank Morgan chronology
You Must Believe in Spring (1992)	Listen to the Dawn (1994)	Love, Lost & Found (1995)

Listen to the Dawn is a studio album by saxophonist Frank Morgan which was recorded in 1993 and released on the Antilles label the following year.

== Reception ==
Professional ratings
Review scores
Source	Rating
AllMusic	4.5/5 stars

The review by AllMusic's Alex Henderson said: "Listen to the Dawn is a rare example of Frank Morgan recording an entire album without a pianist. The veteran alto saxophonist, who was only two weeks away from his 60th birthday when this post-bop/be bop CD was recorded, evidently wanted to try something a bit different – and it was a move that paid off creatively. ... Morgan is especially introspective and really takes time to reflect. This compelling CD should not be missed."

In the Chicago Tribune, Howard Reich wrote: "One of the great success stories in jazz has been the re-emergence of alto saxophonist Frank Morgan, who, following a period of emotional and personal decline, has regained hold of his life and released one beguiling album after another. The latest, Listen to the Dawn, is no exception, summing up the warmth and spirituality of the reborn Morgan."

== Track listing ==
1. "Listen to the Dawn" (Kenny Burrell) – 7:54
2. "Grooveyard" (Carl Perkins) – 4:44
3. "Remembering" (Burrell) – 9:00
4. "Little Waltz" (Ron Carter) – 5:02
5. "It Might as Well Be Spring" (Richard Rodgers, Oscar Hammerstein II) – 4:58
6. "When Joanna Loved Me" (Jack Segal, Robert Wells) – 9:03
7. "I Didn't Know About You" (Duke Ellington, Bob Russell) – 6:46
8. "Goodbye" (Gordon Jenkins) – 4:46

== Personnel ==
Musicians

- Frank Morgan – alto saxophone
- Kenny Burrell – classical guitar (tracks 1 & 7), electric guitar (Tracks 2–6 & 8)
- Ron Carter – bass
- Grady Tate – drums

Production

- John Snyder – producer
- Bil Emmons, Fred Kevorkian – engineer
