= Bebop Lives! =

Live album by Frank Morgan Quartet
- Released: 1987
- Recorded: December 14 & 15, 1986
- Venue: Village Vanguard, NYC
- Genre: Jazz
- Length: 60:06
- Label: Contemporary; C-14026
- Producer: Richard Bock

Frank Morgan chronology
| Double Image (1987) | Bebop Lives! (1987) | Quiet Fire (1987) |

Bebop Lives! is a live album by saxophonist Frank Morgan which was recorded at the Village Vanguard in 1986 and released on the Contemporary label.

== Reception ==
Professional ratings
Review scores
| Source | Rating |
|---|---|
| Allmusic | 4.5/5 stars |

The review by Allmusic's Scott Yanow said: "Altoist Frank Morgan pays tribute to his bebop beginnings on this live set from the Village Vanguard ... The music often swings hard, and Morgan, although initially influenced strongly by Charlie Parker, sounds quite original, pushing at the tradition".

== Track listing ==
1. "What Is This Thing Called Love?" (Cole Porter) – 9:02
2. "Parker's Mood" (Charlie Parker) – 8:12
3. "Well, You Needn't" (Thelonious Monk) – 8:04
4. "Little Melonae" (Jackie McLean) – 9:13
5. "Come Sunday" (Duke Ellington) – 3:25
6. "All the Things You Are" (Jerome Kern, Oscar Hammerstein II) – 11:57
7. "A Night in Tunisia" (Dizzy Gillespie, Frank Paparelli) – 10:13 Additional track on CD release

== Personnel ==
=== Performance ===
- Frank Morgan – alto saxophone
- Johnny Coles – flugelhorn
- Cedar Walton – piano
- Buster Williams – bass
- Billy Higgins – drums

=== Production ===
- Richard Bock – producer
- Tom Mark – engineer
