= A Lovesome Thing (Frank Morgan album) =

Studio album by Frank Morgan
- Released: 1991
- Recorded: September 5–6, 1990
- Studios: BMG Studios, NYC
- Genre: Jazz
- Length: 54:32
- Labels: Antilles; 848 213-2
- Producer: John Snyder

Frank Morgan chronology
Mood Indigo (1989)	A Lovesome Thing (1991)	You Must Believe in Spring (1992)

A Lovesome Thing is an album by saxophonist Frank Morgan which was recorded in 1990 and released on the Antilles label the following year.

== Reception ==
Professional ratings
Review scores
Source	Rating
Allmusic	3/5 stars

The review by Allmusic's Scott Yanow said: "There are no barnburners on the date but overall the music is rewarding".

== Track listing ==
1. "When You Wish Upon a Star" (Leigh Harline, Ned Washington) – 2:05
2. "Footprints" (Wayne Shorter) – 7:00
3. "Ten Cents a Dance" (Richard Rodgers, Lorenz Hart) – 5:25
4. "Everything Happens to Me" (Matt Dennis, Tom Adair) – 7:05
5. "Helen's Song" (George Cables) – 6:29
6. "Pannonica" (Thelonious Monk) – 9:11
7. "Wholey Earth" (Abbey Lincoln) – 5:17
8. "A Flower Is a Lovesome Thing" (Billy Strayhorn) – 7:20
9. "Lullaby" (Cables) – 4:40

== Personnel ==
=== Performance ===
- Frank Morgan – alto saxophone, soprano saxophone
- George Cables – piano
- David Williams – bass
- Lewis Nash – drums
- Roy Hargrove – trumpet (tracks 2, 4 & 5)
- Abbey Lincoln – vocals (tracks 3 & 7)

=== Production ===
- John Snyder – producer
- Jay Newland, Joe Lopes – engineer
