= Twin Cities Jazz Fest =

Jazz festival in St. Paul, Minnesota, U.S.

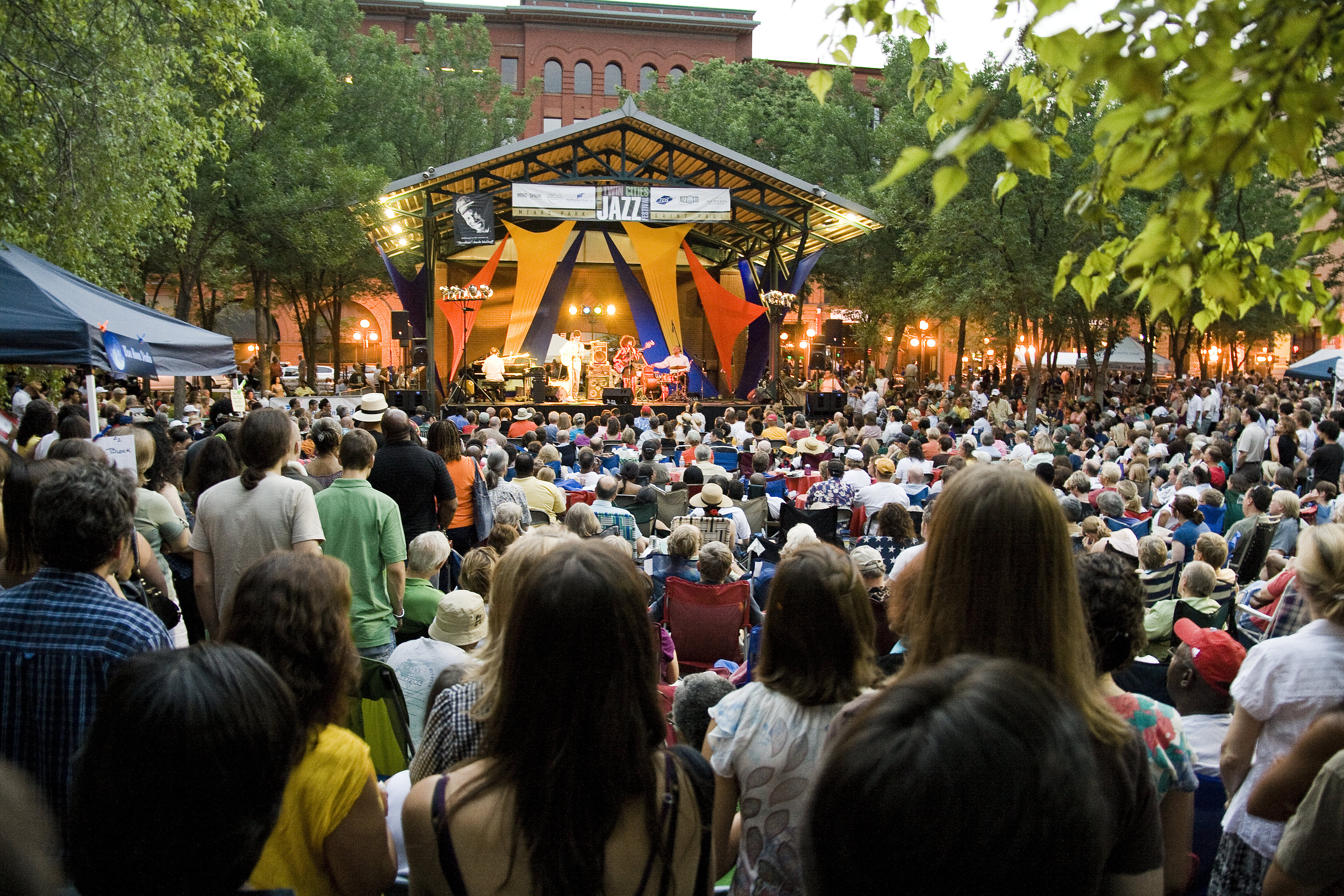
- Genre: Jazz
- Dates: 19-20 June 2026
- Venue: Mears Park
- Locations: St. Paul, Minnesota
- Coordinates: 44°56′39″N 93°5′37″W
- Years active: 1999–2019, 2021–
- Founders: Steve Heckler
- Attendance: 30,000 (estimate)
- Website: twincitiesjazzfestival.com

The Twin Cities Jazz Fest, formerly Twin Cities Hot Summer Jazz Festival, is a jazz festival in St. Paul, Minnesota, USA. Founded in 1999 by Steve Heckler. The festival is centered in the Lowertown neighborhood in downtown St. Paul. The main stage is located in Mears Park with additional stages throughout the city. The festival closes several blocks and has used clubs such as the Bulldog, Hat Trick, St. Paul Hotel, Mancini's, MetroNOME Brewery, Black Dog, Hygga, Vieux Carre, Union Depot, Erta Ale Ethiopian Restaurant, Amsterdam Bar and Gril, and the Citizen Bar and Grill. Some performances are also held outside the city in affiliation with the festival at venues such as Crooner's Supper Club, Berlin, and Volstead’s Emporium Uptown. In partnership with the Dakota Foundation for Jazz Education and Walker West Music Academy, over 100 young musicians perform at the festival. In addition, master classes and clinics are held with support form the MacPhail Center for Music and Walker West Music Academy hosted by the festival headliners. All events are free and open to all. A festival jam session is also open to musicians on both main nights.

Media partners have included Jazz 88 radio (broadcasting live locally and streaming live on the internet internationally), WCCO-TV, City Pages, Jazz Police, La Prenza, and MPLS-St. Paul magazine. The festival has received coverage in the Star Tribune, St. Paul Pioneer Press, Minnesota Spokesman-Recorder, Lavender, and Skyway News.

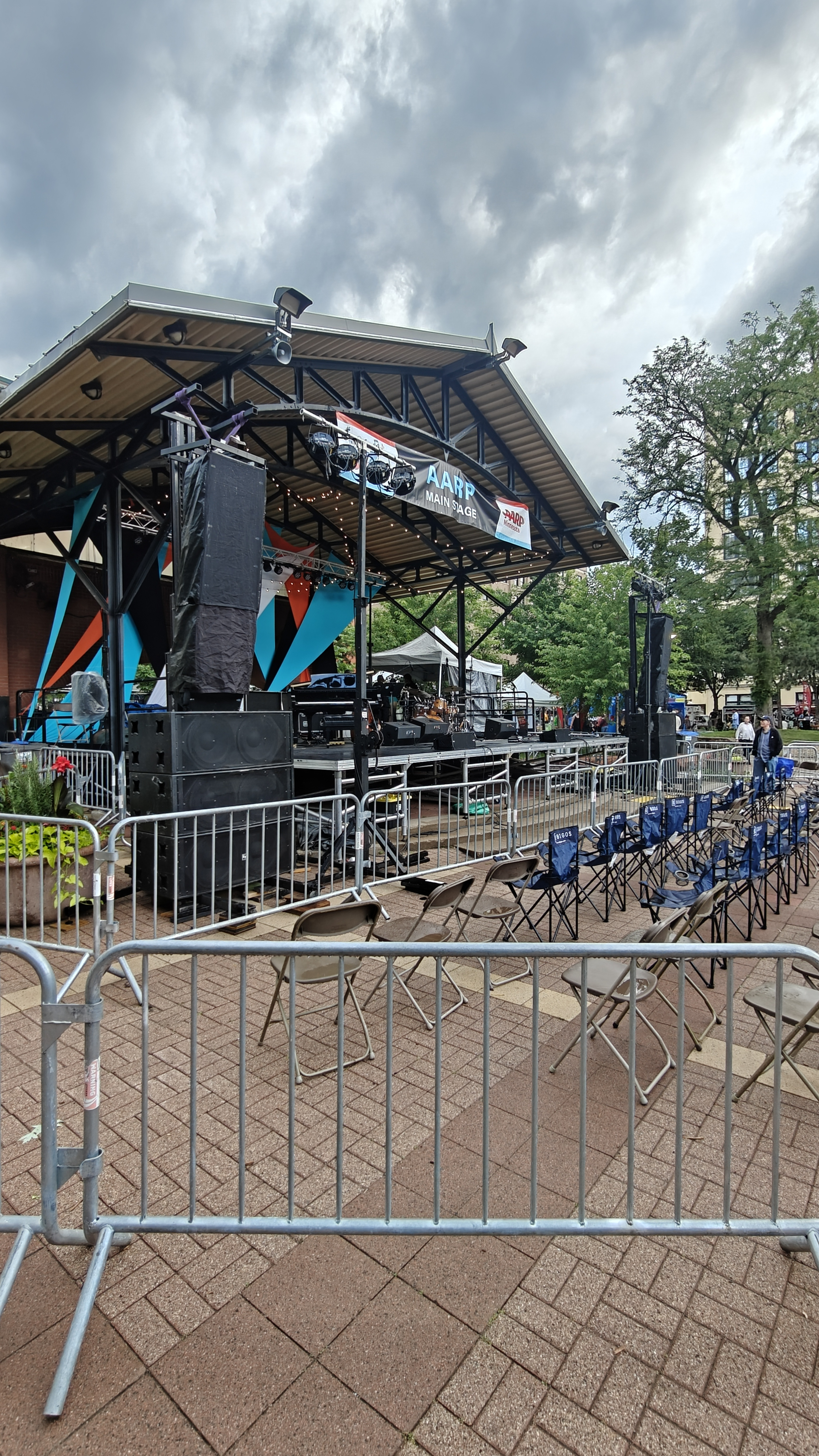
The main stage in Mears Park for the Twin Cities Jazz Fest in 2026.

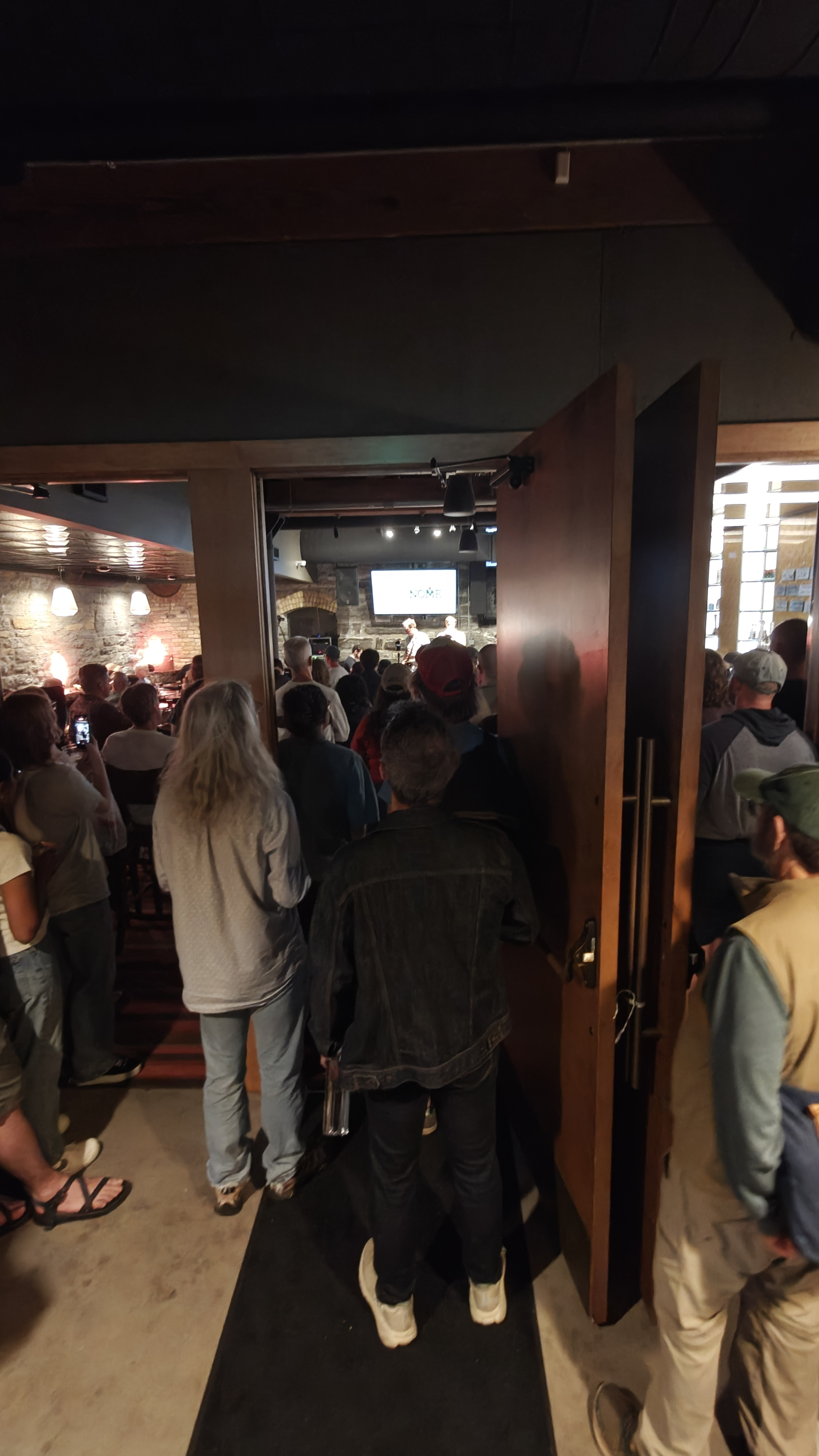
A performance by Wave Cage at Finnegan's Cave in MetroNOME Brewery in 2026.

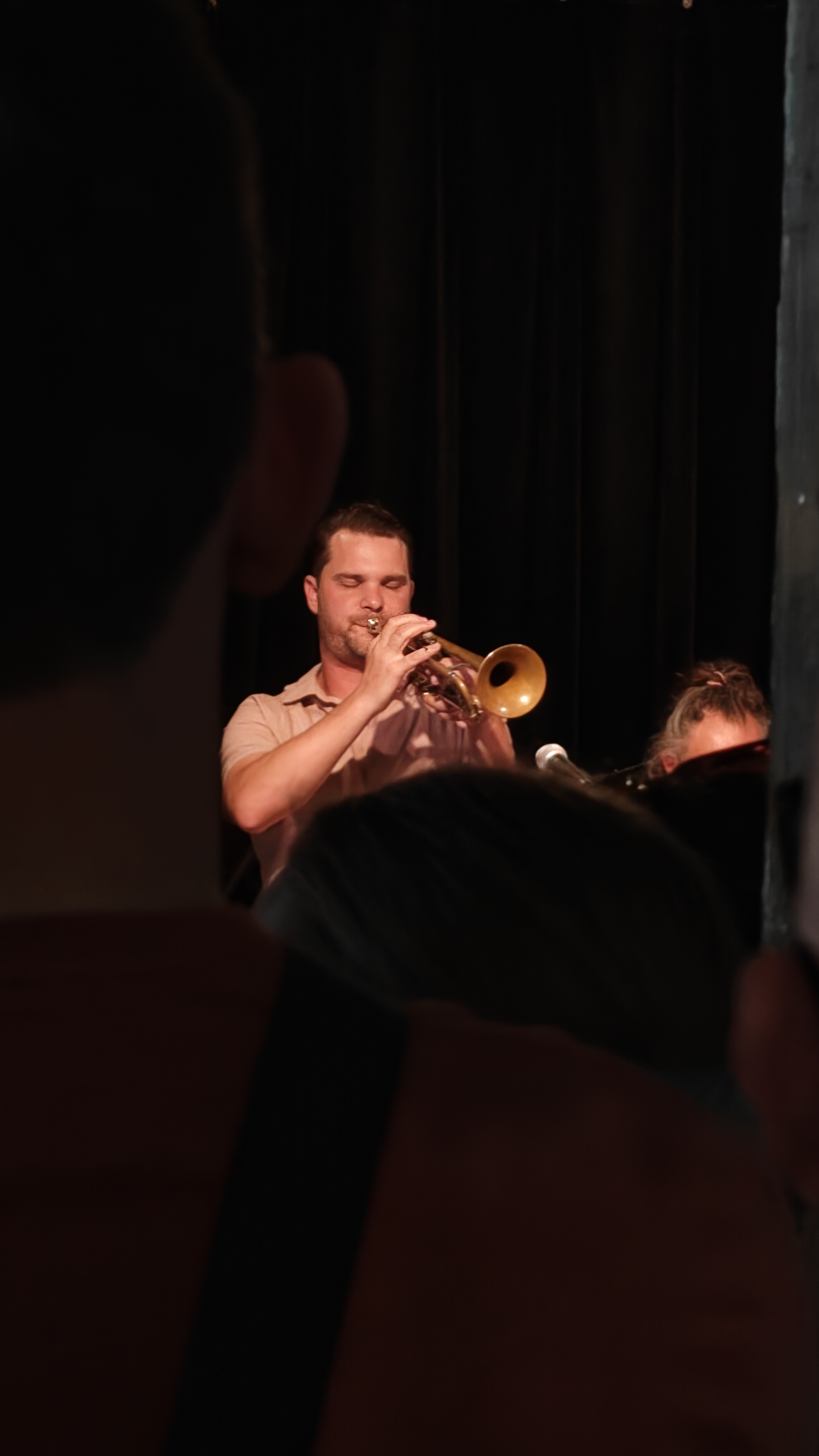
Jake Baldwin Quartet in Nautilus Music Theater in 2026. Jake Baldwin pictured on trumpet.

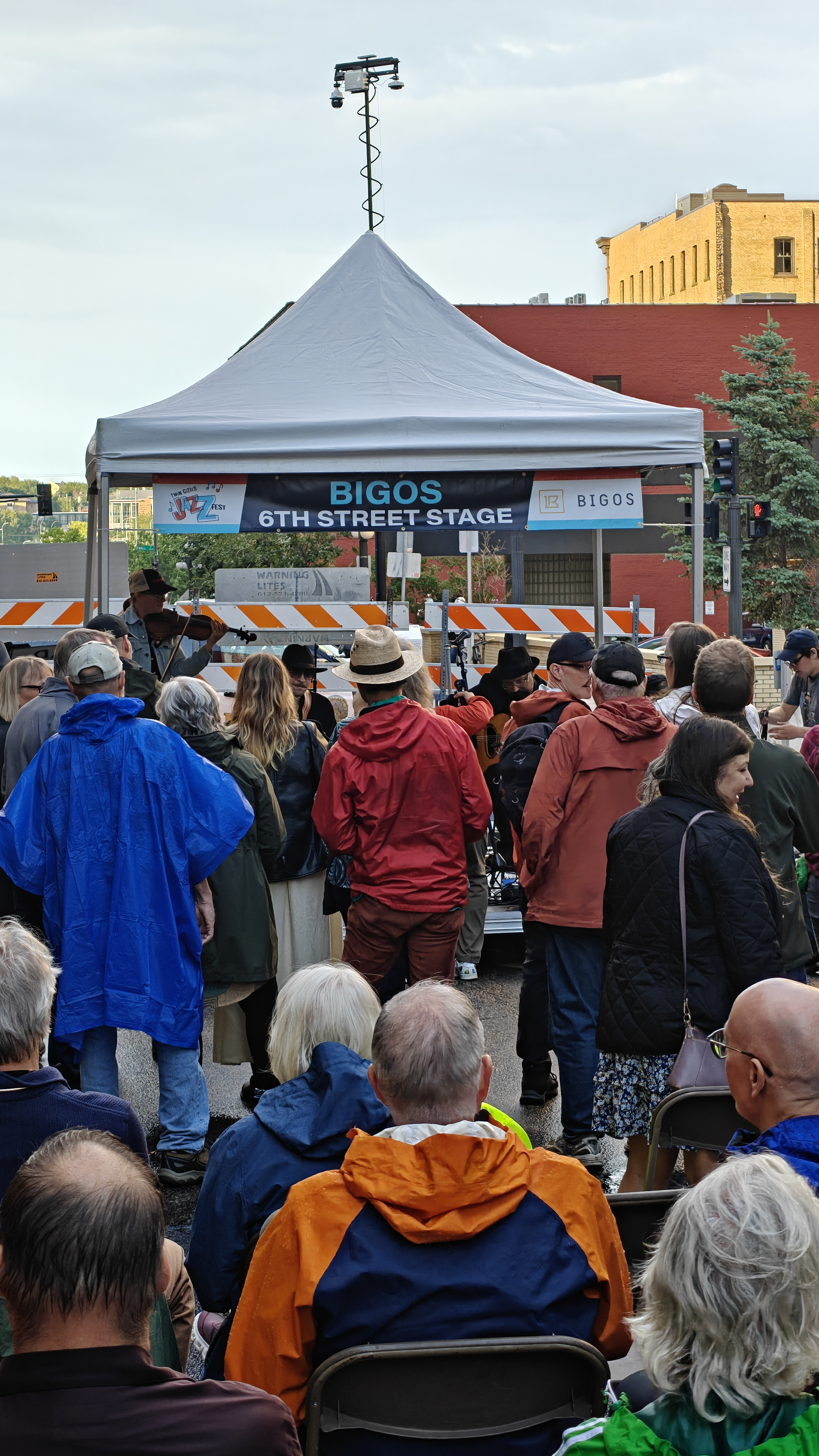
Mississippi Hot Club plays on the 6th Street outdoor side stage in 2026.

Festival performers have included McCoy Tyner, Joey Alexander, Dee Dee Bridgewater, Joshua Redman, The Bad Plus, Nayo Jones, Eric Alexander, Monty Alexander, Mose Allison, Dave Brubeck, Gary Burton, Joey DeFrancesco, Eumir Deodato, Bill Evans, Von Freeman, Benny Golson, Hiromi, Red Holloway, Kristin Korb, Bettye LaVette, Howard Levy, Joe Lovano, Branford Marsalis, Frank Morgan, Jack McDuff, Jimmy McGriff, David "Fathead" Newman, Tiger Okoshi, Danilo Pérez, Bernard Purdie, Phil Hey Quartet, Dewey Redman, Return to Forever, Melvin Rhyne, Bobby Sanabria, Esperanza Spalding, Spyro Gyra, Percy Strother, Ira Sullivan, Lew Tabackin, Clark Terry, Butch Thompson, Jon Weber, Jerry Weldon, Yogev Shetrit, and the Yellowjackets.

No Jazz Fest was held in 2020 due to the COVID-19 pandemic. The festival returned in 2021, with some events held in-person and others virtually.
