= Easy Living (Frank Morgan album) =

Studio album by Frank Morgan with the Cedar Walton Trio
- Released: 1985
- Recorded: June 12 & 13, 1985
- Studio: Monterey Sound Studio, Glendale, CA
- Genre: Jazz
- Length: 46:03
- Label: Contemporary; C-14013
- Producer: Richard Bock

Frank Morgan chronology
| Frank Morgan (1955) | Easy Living (1985) | Lament (1986) |

Easy Living is an album by saxophonist Frank Morgan which was recorded in 1985 and released on the Contemporary label. It was Morgan's first album released under his leadership in 30 years following his recording debut in 1955.

== Reception ==
Professional ratings
Review scores
| Source | Rating |
|---|---|
| Allmusic | 4.5/5 stars |
| The Penguin Guide to Jazz Recordings | 3/4 stars |

The review by Allmusic's Scott Yanow said: "After nearly 30 years off the scene, altoist Frank Morgan made a remarkable comeback. Despite his years in prison and obscurity, he had not lost anything in his playing; in fact, he had grown as an individual. ... Morgan's improbable comeback after such a long period was fortunately permanent. ... and in addition to being a historic date, the music is excellent".

== Track listing ==
1. "Manhã de Carnaval" (Luiz Bonfá, Antônio Maria) – 6:06
2. "Yes and No" (Wayne Shorter) – 6:15
3. "Easy Living" (Ralph Rainger, Leo Robin) – 6:30
4. "The Rubber Man" (Cedar Walton) – 4:08
5. "Third Street Blues" (Walton) – 5:11
6. "Three Flowers" (McCoy Tyner) – 6:20
7. "Embraceable You" (George Gershwin, Ira Gershwin) – 6:15
8. "Now's the Time" (Charlie Parker) – 5:38

== Personnel ==
=== Performance ===
- Frank Morgan – alto saxophone
- Cedar Walton – piano
- Tony Dumas – bass
- Billy Higgins – drums

=== Production ===
- Richard Bock – producer
- Arne Frager – engineer
