= Phil Hey Quartet =

American jazz band

- Origin: Minneapolis–Saint Paul
- Genres: Jazz, bebop, hard bop
- Members: Phil Hey; Dave Hagedorn; Phil Aaron; Tom Lewis

The Phil Hey Quartet is an American jazz band formed in Minneapolis–Saint Paul. The band (affectionately referred to as "PHQ" by fans) is led by founder Phil Hey, an American jazz drummer. The Phil Hey Quartet features Phil Hey on drums, Tom Lewis on bass, Dave Hagedorn on vibraphone, and Phil Aaron on piano. The group released Subduction: Live At The Artist's Quarter in 2005 which was subsequently named Best Jazz CD of the Year by the Twin Cities alternative weekly newspaper City Pages. City Pages also named him 2006 Jazz Musician of the Year.

The band has performed regularly around the Twin Cities at venues including the Artists' Quarter, the Icehouse, and Jazz Central. The group also plays at several regional festivals including the Twin Cities Hot Summer Jazz Festival. In 2016 Phil Hey and his band performed on the main sage at the Iowa City Jazz Festival.

== Discography ==
2005 - Subduction: Live At The Artist's Quarter
