= I Remember You (John Hicks album) =

Live album by John Hicks
- Released: July 28, 2009
- Recorded: 2006; New Hope, Pennsylvania
- Genre: Jazz
- Length: 55:41
- Label: HighNote; HCD 7191
- Producer: Joe Fields and Jon Rosenberg

John Hicks chronology
On the Wings of an Eagle (2006)	I Remember You (2009)	Sweet Love of Mine (2006)

I Remember You is a live solo album by pianist John Hicks which was recorded in 2006 shortly before Hick's death and released on the HighNote label. The album was released posthumously in 2009.

== Reception ==
Allmusic reviewed the album stating "An underrated genius of jazz piano if ever there was one, Hicks died before reaping the ultimate rewards and high praise he deserved, so this CD not only reflects a certain melancholy, but celebrates what an original jazz interpreter he truly was... Where Hicks was primarily an ensemble performer, it's good to hear him alone and together with his beloved piano, making subtle and substantive music from the heart".

Professional ratings
Review scores
Source	Rating
Allmusic	3.5/5 stars

== Track listing ==
1. "Reflections" (Thelonious Monk) – 7:11
2. "I Remember You" (Victor Schertzinger, Johnny Mercer) – 11:04
3. "A Nightingale Sang in Berkeley Square" (Eric Maschwitz, Manning Sherwin) – 3:38
4. "All of You" (Cole Porter) – 1:59
5. "Solar" (Miles Davis) – 8:40
6. "I Want to Talk About You" (Billy Eckstine) – 3:25
7. "Everytime We Say Goodbye" (Porter) – 6:49
8. "Upper Manhattan Medical Group" (Billy Strayhorn) – 4:09
9. "Nutty" (Monk) – 8:46

== Personnel ==
- John Hicks – piano
