= Raising the Standard =

Live album by Frank Morgan
- Released: June 28, 2005
- Recorded: November 28–30, 2003
- Venue: Jazz Standard, NYC
- Genre: Jazz
- Length: 59:57
- Label: HighNote; HCD 7143
- Producer: Reggie Marshall

Frank Morgan chronology
City Nights: Live at the Jazz Standard (2004)	Raising the Standard (2005)	Reflections (2006)

Raising the Standard (subtitled Live at the Jazz Standard Vol. 2) is a live album by saxophonist Frank Morgan which was recorded at the Jazz Standard in 2003 and released on the HighNote label in 2005.

== Reception ==
Professional ratings
Review scores
Source	Rating
All About Jazz	4/5 stars
All About Jazz	4/5 stars
The Penguin Guide to Jazz Recordings	3/4 stars

Writing for All About Jazz, Joel Roberts observed "It charts little new ground but serves up some of the best, most authentic modern bebop you're likely to hear anywhere" stating "Raising the Standard is another fine effort by one of jazz's most inspiring artists". On the same site Jack Bowers said "Raising the Standard is another impressive tour de force for Morgan and his mates, one that is easily recommended".

In JazzTimes, David Franklin noted "Almost 70 at the time and having suffered a stroke five years earlier, Morgan still plays with youthful exuberance". In The Japan Times, Michael Pronko wrote "This straight-on jazz has all the pretences stripped away, and however they were stripped away, the result is inspiring".

== Track listing ==
1. "Polka Dots and Moonbeams" (Jimmy Van Heusen, Johnny Burke) – 5:03
2. "Footprints" (Wayne Shorter) – 8:39
3. "Nefertiti" (Shorter) – 2:50
4. "Don't Get Around Much Anymore" (Duke Ellington, Bob Russell) – 9:37
5. "Old Folks" (Willard Robison, Dedette Lee Hill) – 5:26
6. "Tune Up" (Miles Davis) – 8:45
7. "In a Sentimental Mood" (Ellington) – 4:58
8. "Helen's Song" (George Cables) – 7:26
9. "Bessie's Blues" (John Coltrane) – 7:10

== Personnel ==
=== Performance ===
- Frank Morgan – alto saxophone
- George Cables – piano
- Curtis Lundy – bass
- Billy Hart – drums

=== Production ===
- Reggie Marshall – producer
- Randall Funke – engineer
