= City Nights: Live at the Jazz Standard =

Live album by Frank Morgan
- Released: August 3, 2004
- Recorded: November 28–30, 2003
- Venue: Jazz Standard, NYC
- Genre: Jazz
- Length: 65:20
- Label: HighNote; HCD 7129
- Producer: Reggie Marshall

Frank Morgan chronology
Bop! (1996)	City Nights: Live at the Jazz Standard (2004)	Raising the Standard (2005)

City Nights: Live at the Jazz Standard is the first of three live albums by saxophonist Frank Morgan that were recorded at the Jazz Standard in 2003 and released on the HighNote label.

== Reception ==
Professional ratings
Review scores
Source	Rating
AllMusic	4/5 stars
All About Jazz	4.5/5 stars
The Guardian	3/5 stars
The Penguin Guide to Jazz Recordings	3/4 stars

The review by AllMusic's Al Campbell said: "saxophonist Frank Morgan continues to illuminate the Charlie Parker style of bebop he's been playing since the mid-'50s ... Morgan is featured on alto saxophone throughout, accompanied by an excellent trio of jazz stalwarts who have frequently collaborated over the years ... These musicians work collective wonders and consistently inspire Morgan, making this set highly recommended".

All About Jazz writer Florence Wetzel stated "Despite his stature in the jazz world, Morgan still considers himself a student of the music; as he says in the liner notes, "I'm on a Monk journey." This fresh approach combined with years of experience gives City Nights a wonderful vitality. It's 64 minutes of pure delight, jazz at its classic best played by a living master".

In JazzTimes, David Franklin noted "The set was completely unrehearsed and even unplanned. Except for a spot in “Cherokee” where disagreement about the tune’s form surfaces briefly, the informality of the session, with its resulting in-the-moment freshness, was a good thing".

In The Guardian, John Fordham wrote "This may appeal chiefly to those who know Morgan and wondered what he was up to, but on this evidence that's quite a lot".

== Track listing ==
1. "Georgia on My Mind" (Hoagy Carmichael, Stuart Gorrell) – 5:16
2. "Cherokee" (Ray Noble) – 10:26
3. "Summertime" (George Gershwin, Ira Gershwin, DuBose Heyward) – 7:44
4. "All Blues" (Miles Davis) – 7:27
5. "I Mean You" (Coleman Hawkins, Thelonious Monk) – 7:41
6. "'Round Midnight" (Thelonious Monk, Cootie Williams, Bernie Hanighen) – 6:20
7. "Equinox" (John Coltrane) – 12:09
8. "Impressions" (Coltrane) – 8:17

== Personnel ==
=== Performance ===
- Frank Morgan – alto saxophone
- George Cables – piano
- Curtis Lundy – bass
- Billy Hart – drums

=== Production ===
- Reggie Marshall – producer
- Randall Funke – engineer
