= You Must Believe in Spring (Frank Morgan album) =

Studio album by Frank Morgan
- Released: 1992
- Recorded: March 10–11, 1992
- Studios: BMG Studios, New York City
- Genre: Jazz
- Length: 60:54
- Labels: Antilles; 314 512 570
- Producer: John Snyder

Frank Morgan chronology
| A Lovesome Thing (1991) | You Must Believe in Spring (1992) | Listen to the Dawn (1993) |

You Must Believe in Spring is an album by saxophonist Frank Morgan featuring duets with various pianists which was recorded in 1992 and released on the Antilles label.

== Reception ==
Professional ratings
Review scores
| Source | Rating |
|---|---|
| AllMusic | 4/5 stars |
| The Penguin Guide to Jazz Recordings | 3/4 stars |

The review by AllMusic's Ron Wynn said: "Morgan's biting, yet sensitive and rich alto has rightly been traced to Charlie Parker, but Morgan long ago rid his style of any imitative excesses. He was excellently supported on this program of duets by an amazing lineup of rotating pianists".

== Track listing ==
1. "But Beautiful" (Jimmy Van Heusen, Johnny Burke) – 5:39
2. "You've Changed" (Victor Young, Edward Heyman, Tony Martin) – 5:06
3. "With Malice Toward None" (Tom McIntosh) – 4:00
4. "Something Borrowed, Something Blue" (Tommy Flanagan) – 6:41
5. "I Should Care" (Axel Stordahl, Paul Weston Sammy Cahn) – 6:25
6. "Embraceable You" (George Gershwin Ira Gershwin) – 4:42
7. "While the Gettin's Good Blues" (Barry Harris, Frank Morgan) – 4:46
8. "My Heart Stood Still" (Richard Rodgers, Lorenz Hart) – 2:53
9. "Enigma" (Roland Hanna) – 4:30
10. "I Cover the Waterfront" (Johnny Green, Heyman) – 3:28
11. "You Must Believe in Spring" (Michel Legrand) – 6:03
12. "Come Sunday" (Duke Ellington) – 6:41

== Personnel ==
=== Performance ===
- Frank Morgan – alto saxophone (tracks 2, 4, 6, 7, 9, 11 & 12)
- Kenny Barron (tracks 1 & 2), Tommy Flanagan (tracks 3 & 4), Roland Hanna (tracks 8 & 9), Barry Harris (tracks 5–7), Hank Jones (tracks 10–12) – piano

=== Production ===
- John Snyder – producer
- Jay Newland, Joe Lopes – engineer
