= Artists' Quarter =

Jazz club in Minnesota, United States

- The AQ
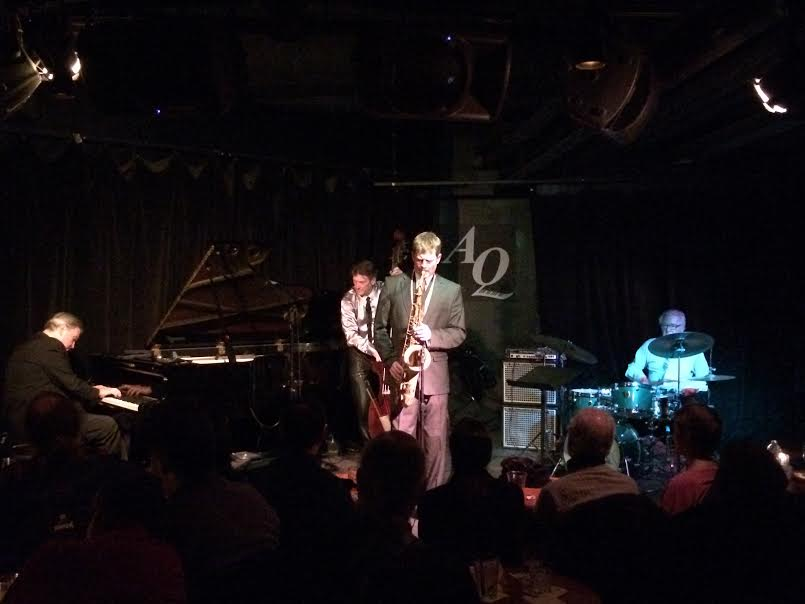
- Eric Alexander and David Hazeltine at the Artists' Quarter in 2013
- Address: 408 Saint Peter St.
- Location: Saint Paul, Minnesota
- Type: Nightclub

Construction
- Opened: Early 1970s (Nicollet Avenue location); 1995 (Jackson Street location); 2001 (Downtown Saint Paul location)

The Artists' Quarter (a.k.a. the AQ) was a well-known musician-owned and operated jazz club in the Twin Cities.

== History ==
The club opened in the early 1970s in Minneapolis, Minnesota at 26th Street and Nicollet Avenue South. After the original club closed in 1990, drummer Kenny Horst opened a new location at the corner of Fifth and Jackson streets in Saint Paul, Minnesota in 1995. The club moved to the basement of the historic Hamm Building in downtown St. Paul in 2001.

The club featured both local and touring musicians. Many famous musicians played at the AQ, including Pepper Adams, Roy Haynes, Mose Allison, Joey DeFrancesco, Sweets Edison, Lew Tabackin, Eric Alexander, Jack McDuff, Dewey Redman, Curtis Fuller, Benny Golson, Wallace Roney, and others. Lee Konitz, Roy Haynes, David Hazeltine, Ira Sullivan, Bill Carrothers, Dean Granros, Phil Hey Quartet, Atlantis Quartet, Bobby Peterson, Bob Malach, Andrés Prado, and Billy Holloman have all recorded live albums at the Artists' Quarter. The club was voted one of the top 100 jazz clubs in the world in 2009 by Down Beat magazine,

Additionally, the AQ hosted the Soapboxing Poetry Slam, home of the 2009 and 2010 National Poetry Slam Championship Teams.

On October 7, 2013, owner Kenny Horst announced that he would be closing the club on January 1, 2014, due to rising costs since his landlord died in 2012. On October 28, 2013, St. Paul mayor Chris Coleman pledged to keep the AQ open, though no details were shared at that time. As of January 1, 2014, the club is closed.

== Notable performances ==
Roy Haynes earned a Grammy nomination for his drum solo, “Hippidy Hop,” from the live album Whereas, recorded at the club over the weekend of January 20, 2006 (which mayor Chris Coleman officially proclaimed “Roy Haynes Weekend”).

== See also ==
- List of jazz clubs
