= Bandana Square =

- Northern Pacific Railway Company Como Shops Historic District
- U.S. National Register of Historic Places
- U.S. Historic district
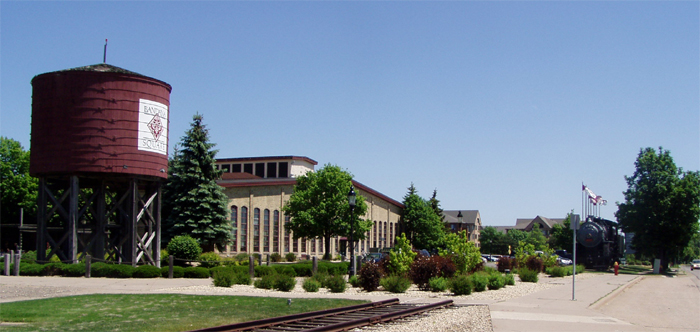
- Bandana Square: steam locomotive and water tower enhancing the railroad theme

- Location within Minnesota Location within the United States
- Location: Energy Park Dr. and Bandana Blvd. Saint Paul, Minnesota
- Coordinates: 44°58′18″N 93°9′11″W
- Built: 1885
- NRHP reference No.: 83000937
- Added to NRHP: March 31, 1983

Bandana Square, formerly the Como Shop of the Northern Pacific Railway, is currently an office center in Saint Paul, Minnesota. However, it was initially designed to be a shopping mall in the Energy Park neighborhood. The site is on the National Register of Historic Places.

== History ==
The complex opened in 1984 after the former Northern Pacific Railway's Como Shops were converted into what was to be a large festival marketplace and hotel complex. The financing and cooperation came from the railroads, the government, and private grants.

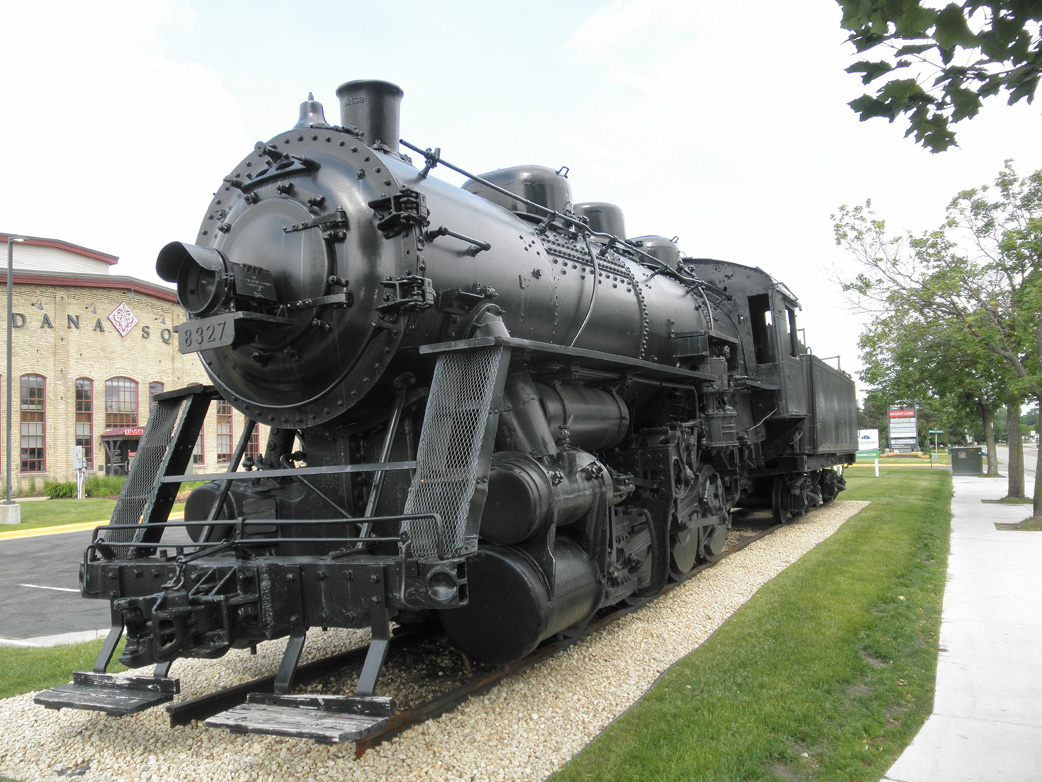
Grand Trunk Western 0-8-0 8327 at Bandana Square

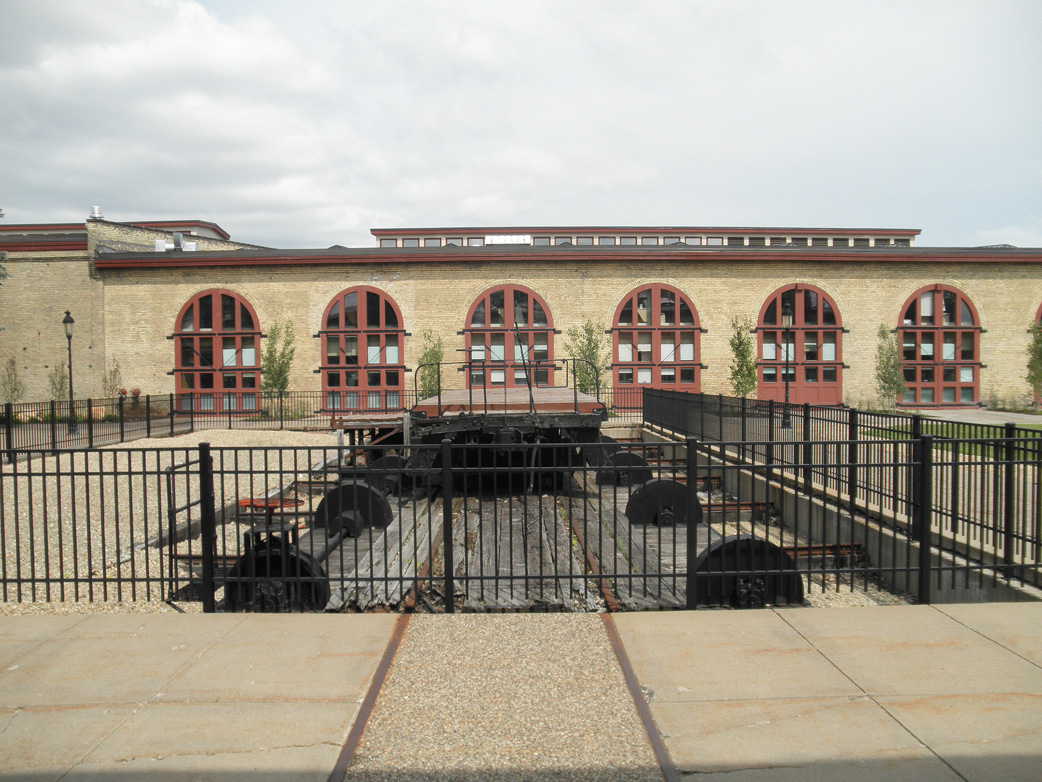
Bandana Square's old transfer table

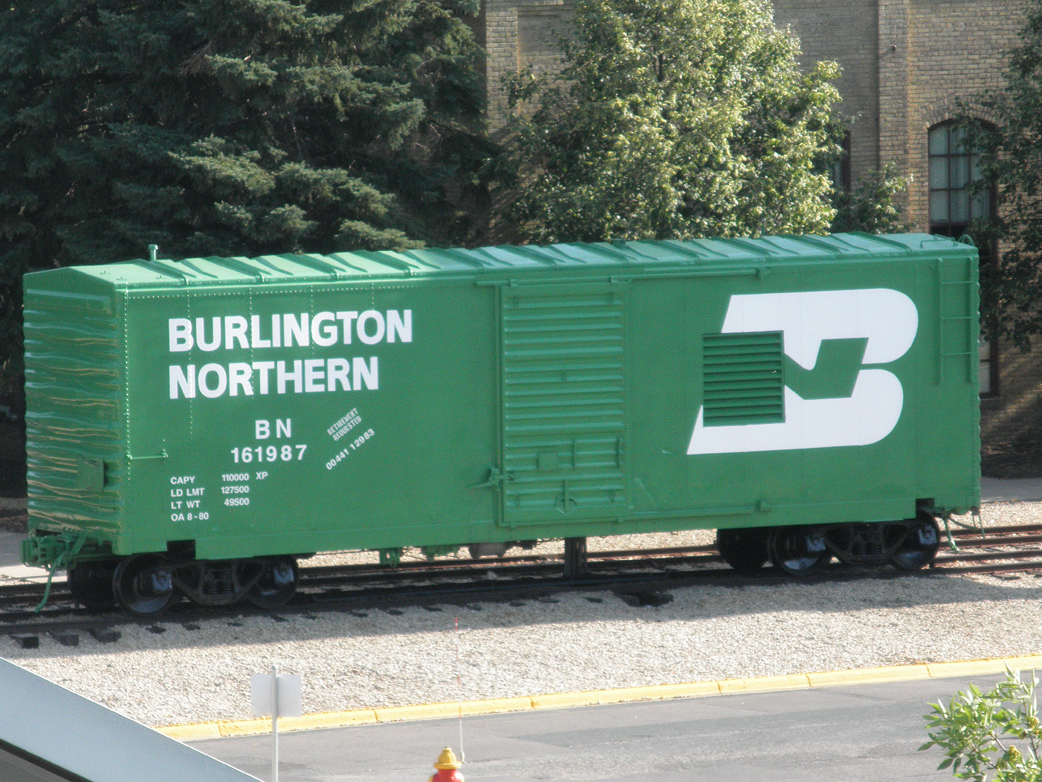
40-foot boxcar on display at Bandana Square

A Best Western hotel and conference center remains at Bandana Square. When Bandana originally opened, the complex was home to various restaurants, such as the Dakota Jazz Club and Restaurant. The Dakota moved to Downtown Minneapolis in 2003. The Dino's Greek fast-food chain also had its first year-round restaurant at Bandana Square (previously, the company had only set up stands at the Minnesota State Fair and other events).

The center was purchased by the Saint Paul-based Wilder Foundation in 1983 for $17 million. By 1989, the foundation had lost $9 million and sought help from the Saint Paul Port Authority. The project had become a financial drain to the foundation and was detracting from its mission to help children and at-risk families. At that time, only 65% of the space was occupied. The Port Authority proposed a plan that would save the Wilder Foundation $780,000 a year, but the Port Authority took over the center in March 1989. The port authority sold it to investors for $3 million, who tried to refocus it as a regional retail and entertainment center. Wellington Management bought the center in 2003 for $6.1 million. The center was converted entirely to offices in 2006.

The Minnesota Children's Museum was located in a building close to Bandana Square from 1985 until 1995, when it moved to Downtown Saint Paul.

The Twin City Model Railroad Museum was located in Bandana Square from 1984 until 2016, when it moved to a new St. Paul location. The museum was the last remaining tenant from the original renovation of the facility into a shopping and entertainment district.

== See also ==
- Galtier Plaza, a similar development in Saint Paul
- Saint Anthony Main, a similar development in Minneapolis
