= Andrés Prado =

Peruvian musician and educator

- Born: Andrés Prado Loayza; 14 August 1971 (age 55); Lima, Peru
- Genres: Jazz, jazz fusion, latin jazz
- Occupations: Musician, guitarist, educator
- Instrument: Guitar
- Years active: 2000–present
- Label: Independent
- Website: andrespradotrio.com

Andrés Prado (born 14 August 1971) is a Peruvian guitarist and music teacher based in Lima, Peru. He has released several works with a focus on jazz, latin-jazz and Afro-Peruvian music. He teaches at the Catholic University of Peru and performs with several ensembles.

== Life and career ==
Born in Lima, Peru, Prado grew up in a musical family. His mother and grandmother played the piano. He started on piano at age four and switched to guitar at age nine. He credits his grandmother for his interest in Latin-American music. He studied jazz and classical music at the National Conservatory of Music in Lima, Avellaneda School of Popular Music in Buenos Aires, and the Trinity College of Music in London.

In 2005 Prado moved to the United States and taught jazz performance at the McNally Smith College of Music in Saint Paul, Minnesota for two years. During this time he signed with RPM Records and worked with bassist Anthony Cox and pianist Peter Schimke, and released three albums. In 2007 he moved to Peru and joined the faculty of the School of Music at the Catholic University of Peru where he teaches jazz improvisation. Prado has continued to perform and record. In 2018 his musical style was characterized as: "jazz based on Peruvian and Latin American roots". His most recent album Barranquino was released in 2019 and features diverse influences including flamenco, saya, jazz and Afro-Peruvian rhythms. He performs with various jazz ensembles in Peru, Argentina, England and the United States.

== Discography ==
=== As leader ===
- Jazz Imagery (2000)
- Andrés Prado Trio (2003)
- Andrés Prado Solo (2006)
- Chinchano (2006)
- Live at the Artists' Quarter (2006)
- Shamánico (2012)
- Barranquino (2019)

=== As sideman ===
- Pena (2010) with Peña
- Afro Peruvian Jazz Celebration (2009) with Corina Bartra
- 25 Años (2012) with Perujazz
- Mississippi (2016) with Mississippi
