= Minnesota Children's Museum =

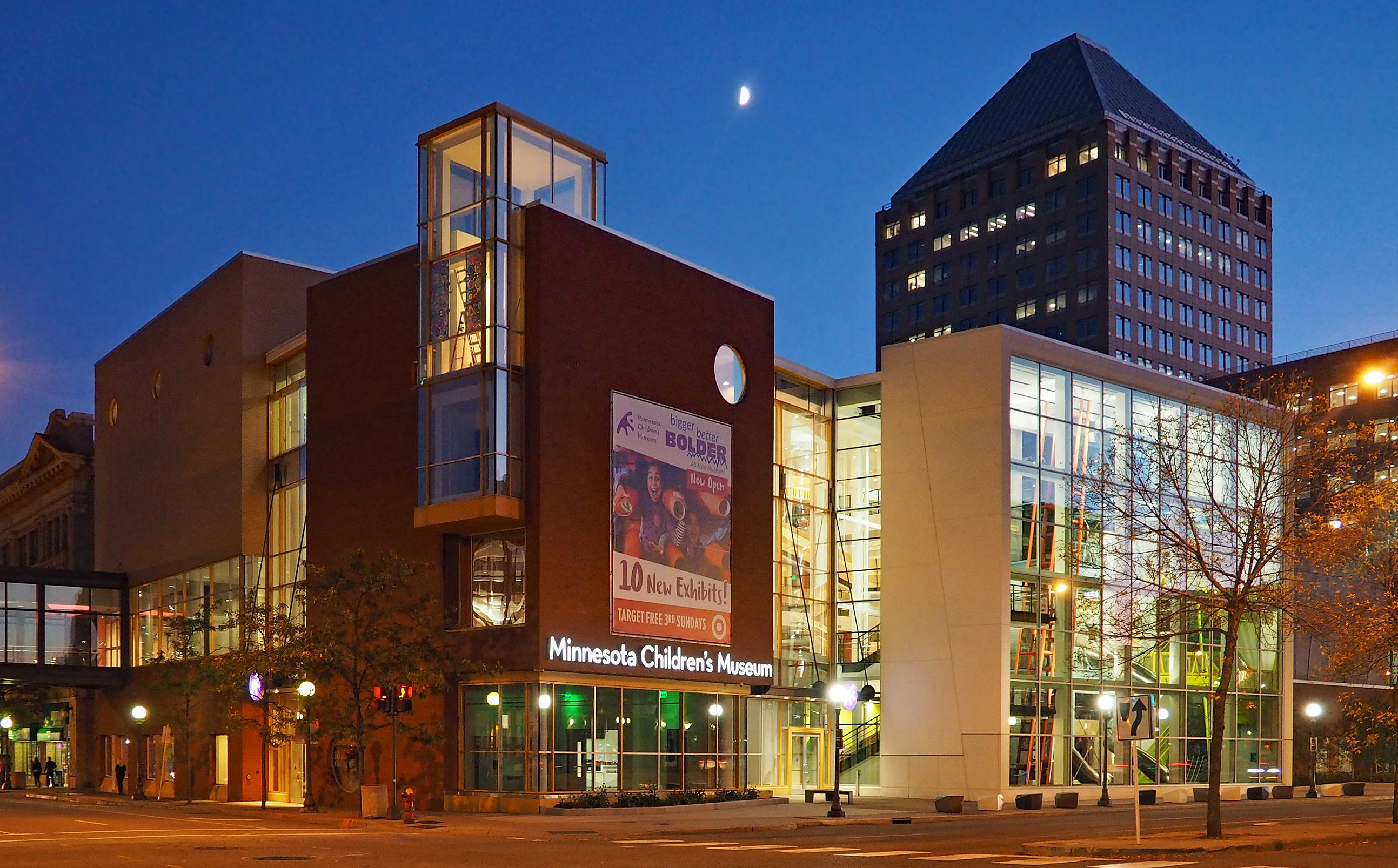
- The Minnesota Children's Museum
- Former name: Minnesota's AwareHouse
- Established: 12 December 1981
- Location: 10 West 7th Street, Saint Paul, Minnesota, US
- Coordinates: 44°56′52″N 93°5′49″W
- Type: Children's museum
- Website: www.mcm.org

The Minnesota Children's Museum is a children's museum in Saint Paul, Minnesota. Founded in 1981 in Minneapolis, the museum moved to St. Paul in 1995.

The museum includes natural exhibits of Minnesota, developmental learning areas for small children, a creativity and problem- solving area, and national traveling exhibits .

== History ==
On December 12, 1981, the Minnesota's AwareHouse, the first children's museum, opened in downtown Minneapolis. Attendance grew to 80,000, and the museum quickly outgrew the original space in downtown Minneapolis. In 1985, the museum moved to an old blacksmith's shop in Bandana Square, transforming dirt walls into 18,000 square feet (1,700 m^{2}) of galleries. By the early 1990s, the museum's visitors and exhibits again outgrew the space in Bandana Square.

In September 1995, the Minnesota Children's Museum in downtown Saint Paul opened with 65,000 square feet (6,000 m^{2}) of gallery and program space. Three of the most popular exhibits moved from Bandana Square to the new museum: Habitot; the Crane (which moved to the World Works gallery), and the Maze (which moved to Earth World and became the giant anthill).

Today, more than 6 million children and their families have visited the Museum. In September 2012, The Museum planned a $26 million expansion and began renovations in late 2015.

On December 5, 2016, the Children's Museum closed until its $30 million renovation was completed. It would reveal a different layout and 10 new exhibits, along with a cafe and coffee bar, more bathrooms and elevators. On June 7, 2017, the Museum reopened to the public.

== Exhibit History Timeline ==
The Wizard of Oz June 12, 2010 to Sept 12, 2010 Shrek Sept 25, 2010 to Jan 2, 2011 Lego Jan 27, 2011 to Feb 11, 2012 Curious George (film) Feb 28, 2012 to July 2, 2012

== Galleries ==
- The Scramble: Four-Story Climber, Giant Spiral Slide & 40-Foot High Catwalk
- Forces at Play: Ping Pong Ball Launchers, Wacky Car Wash & Bubbles Galore
- Shipwreck Adventures: An “Underwater” Adventure Based on a Real Shipwreck
- Imaginopolis: Imaginative Play Space – Now Featuring: Cosmic Junkyard
- Sprouts: Sensory Play Space for Babies and Toddlers (for ages 3 and under)
- Creativity Jam: Now Featuring – The Play Lounge
- Our World: Vibrant Pretend Town with a Fire Station, Post Office & More
- The Studio: Everchanging Maker Space – Now Featuring: Invitation to Draw
- The Backyard: An Immersive Natural World with a Twist – Outdoor Exhibit Open Seasonally
- Tip Top Terrace: Big Frame House, Sensory Garden & Musical Playground – Outdoor Exhibit Open Seasonally
- Special gallery offers traveling exhibits from around the world
