= Dakota Jazz Club =

Jazz club in Minneapolis, Minnesota, US

Coordinates: 44°58′25″N 93°16′31″W

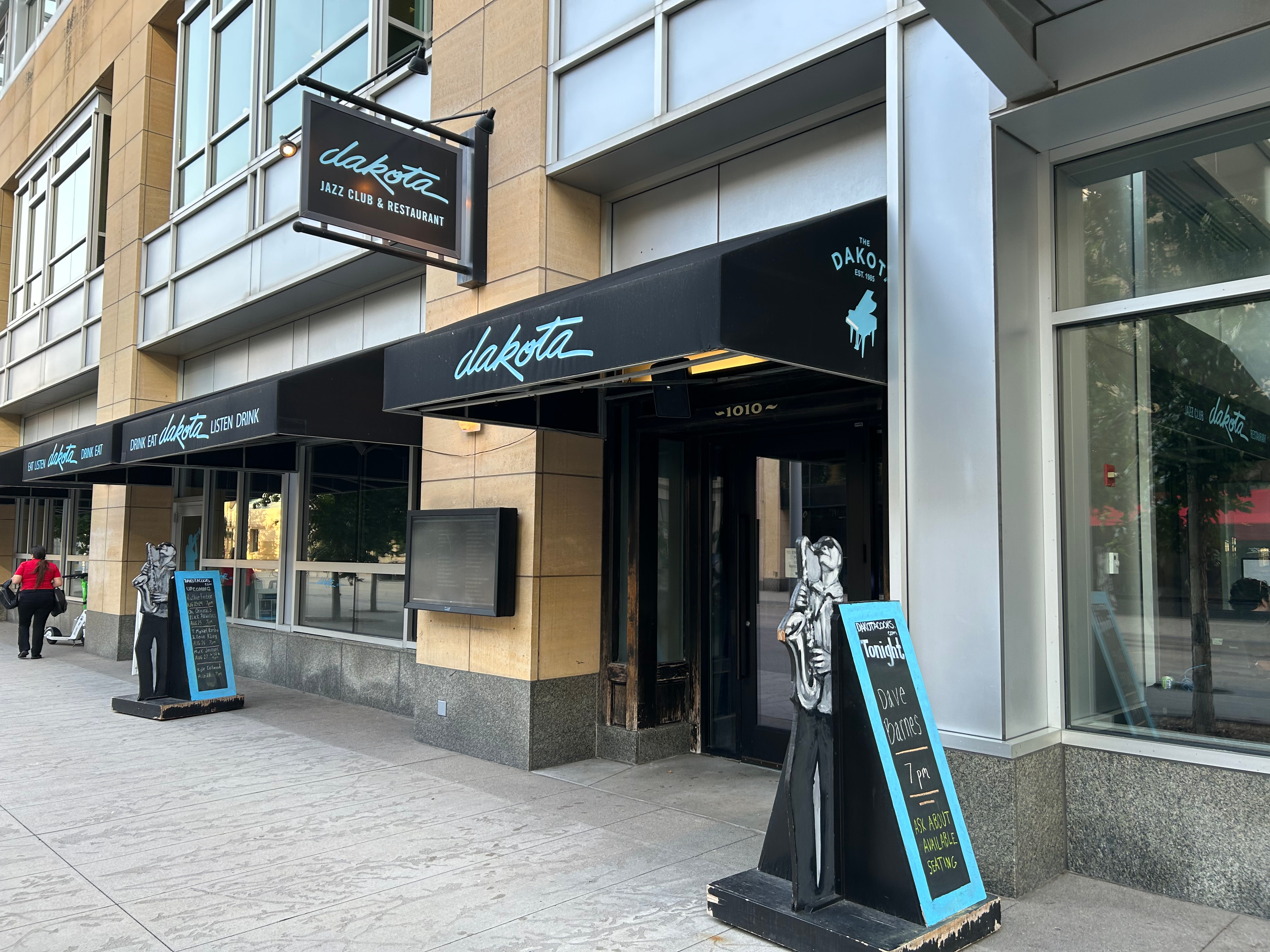
- Interactive map of Dakota Jazz Club
- Address: 1010 Nicollet Avenue
- Location: Minneapolis, Minnesota
- Owner: Lowell Pickett, Richard Erickson
- Capacity: 350
- Type: Jazz club

Construction
- Opened: 1985

Website
- dakotacooks.com

The Dakota Jazz Club and Restaurant is a jazz club in Minneapolis, Minnesota. The club opened in 1985 at Bandana Square in St. Paul, Minnesota as a restaurant with local jazz in the bar. In 1988, the programming expanded to national artists with performances by McCoy Tyner and Ahmad Jamal. In 2003, the Dakota moved to downtown Minneapolis on Nicollet Mall.

== History ==
Opening in 1985 with owner Lowell Pickett and chef Ken Goff as Dakota Bar and Grill, a 1986 review called the food as "nouvelle bar-and-grill cuisine at its best ...". By 1988, local newspaper The Star Tribune noted that Dakota chef Ken Goff stylized the food as "upper Mississippi cuisine" using "local ingredients ... with European techniques." Although music has become what it is now most widely known for, food has continued to be a significant part of the Dakota. The Dakota was one of the first Minnesota restaurants featuring "farm-to-table," working closely with Minnesota growers and developing a new "Midwestern Cuisine" under original Chef Ken Goff.

The original 1985 Bandana Square venue at 1021 Bandana Blvd E was designed by architect Bob Lundgren with assistance from architect Mike McCarthy. The original space had 125 seats in the dining room, with additional capacity in the bar and the 70-seat outdoor patio.

The Dakota was one of three Midwestern restaurants to be featured in a 1988 New York Times article about the emergence of a regional cuisine in the Midwest. Since then, the Dakota has continued to emphasize fresh ingredients from sustainable sources and continues its creative culinary approach.

According to Pickett, talent booking for the Dakota was adversely affected in the early 2000s by air travel anxiety following the 9/11 attacks. Richard Erickson joined Lowell Pickett as a business partner and co-owner during this low point in 2002, and one of their first joint decisions was moving to Minneapolis.

In 2003, the venue moved from Bandana Square to its current location on 1010 Nicollet Avenue. The space acquired by the Dakota was formerly the home of Brasserie Zinc, operated by restaurant and whiskey entrepreneur Kieran Folliard. The closing act for the Bandana Square venue was vocal group Moore by Four from October 10-11, 2003, and the new location opened with a performance from drummer Elvin Jones from October 28-29, 2003.

The current Nicollet Mall location is on the first floor of Target Plaza, a skyscraper serving as the headquarters of the Target Corporation department store chain. The Dakota now accommodates a maximum of 350 guests, split across a main floor, mezzanine, and two private rooms. Seating includes dining tables, booths, and a bar.

The Dakota was impacted by a temporary closure in response to the COVID-19 Pandemic. In September 2025, the Dakota celebrated its 40th anniversary by hosting a free block party, which returned for a second year in 2026.

=== Acts ===
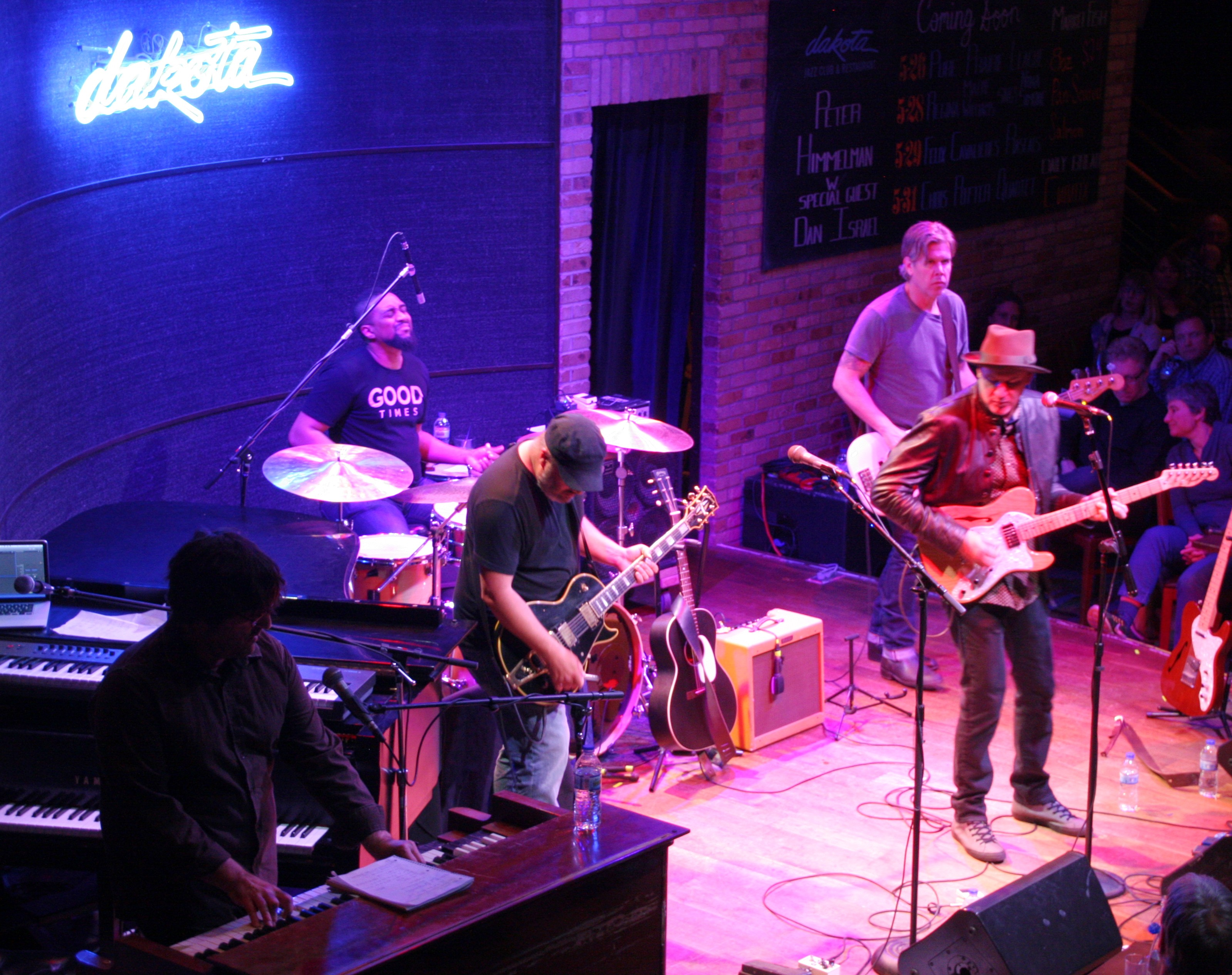
Peter Himmelman at the Dakota Jazz Club in 2017

The list of jazz musicians who have played the Dakota includes The Bad Plus, Patricia Barber, Charles Brown, Ray Brown, James Carter, Bill Carrothers, Regina Carter, Billy Cobham, Harry Connick Jr., Chick Corea, Larry Coryell, Joey DeFrancesco, Al Di Meola, Kurt Elling, Sonny Fortune, Von Freeman, Bill Frisell, Kenny Garrett, Benny Green, Roy Hargrove, Roy Haynes, Dave Holland, Zakir Hussain, Ahmad Jamal, Bob James, Stanley Jordan, Billy Higgins, Bobby Hutcherson, Charles Lloyd, Los Lobos, Wynton Marsalis,Bobby McFerrin, John McLaughlin, Frank Morgan, Jack McDuff, Jimmy McGriff, Pat Martino, Nicholas Payton, Madeleine Peyroux, Prince, Joshua Redman, Wallace Roney, Arturo Sandoval, John Scofield, Ben Sidran, Horace Silver, Toots Thielemans, McCoy Tyner, Hiromi Uehara, Chucho Valdés, and Joe Williams.
