= Bill Saxton =

American saxophonist (born 1946)

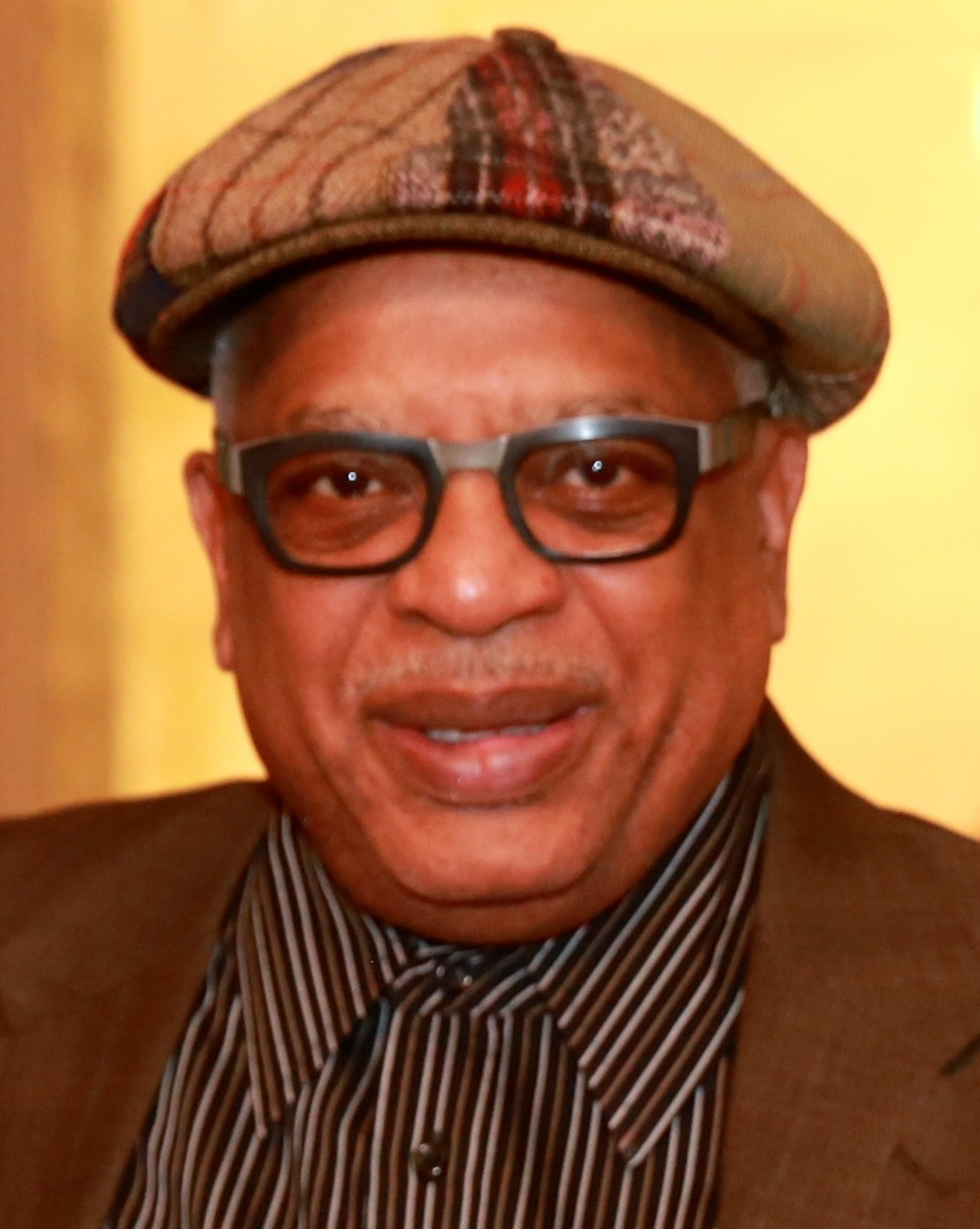

Background information
- Born: William Edward Saxton; June 28, 1946 (age 79); New York City, U.S.
- Genres: Jazz; hard bop
- Occupation: Saxophonist
- Instrument: Tenor saxophone

William Edward Saxton (born June 28, 1946, in New York City) is an American hard bop tenor saxophonist.

He studied clarinet, composition and arrangement at the New England Conservatory in Boston, graduating in 1973, and worked with Pharoah Sanders, Jackie McLean and Bennie Maupin. He began working with Dannie Richmond in 1979, and he later worked with Charlie Persip's big band and Errol Parker. He has worked with Frank Foster, Clark Terry, Carmen McRae, Nancy Wilson, Tito Puente, Mongo Santamaria, Roy Ayers, Bobby Watson and Roy Haynes. He was a Friday-night regular at Nick's jazz pub in Harlem, before he fulfilled a dream of his and opened "New York's only Jazz Speakeasy", "Bill's Place", on West 133rd Street in Harlem in 2006.

== Discography ==
=== As leader ===
- Beneath the Surface (Nilva, 1984) with John Hicks, Ray Drummond, Alvin Queen
- Atymony (Jazzline, 1993) with Carlos McKinney, Omar Avital, Noel Parris

=== As sideman ===
With Ted Curson

- I Heard Mingus (Interplay, 1980)

With Billy Gault

- When Destiny Calls (SteepleChase, 1974)

With Big John Patton

- Blue Planet Man (Evidence, 1993)

With Jimmy Ponder

- Mean Streets – No Bridges (Muse, 1987)

With Dannie Richmond

- Ode to Mingus (Soul Note, 1979)

With Charles Tolliver

- With Love (Blue Note, 2006)
- Emperor March: Live at the Blue Note (Half Note, 2008 [2009])
