= Curtis Lundy =

American jazz musician

- Born: October 1, 1955 (age 70); Miami, Florida, U.S.
- Genres: Jazz
- Occupation: Musician
- Instrument: Double bass
- Years active: 1985–present
- Labels: New Note, Justin Time, Evidence

Curtis Lundy (born October 1, 1955) is an American double bass player, composer, producer, choir director and arranger. Lundy is best known for his work as part of jazz vocalist Betty Carter's band. He is the brother of vocalist Carmen Lundy, with whom he has also recorded.

== Discography ==
=== As leader ===
- Beatitudes with Bobby Watson (New Note, 1983)
- Just Be Yourself (New Note, 1987)
- Against All Odds (Justin Time, 1999)
- Purpose (Justin Time, 2002)

=== As sideman ===
With Billy Bang

- Big Bang Theory (Justin Time, 2000)
- Vietnam: The Aftermath (Justin Time, 2001)
- Vietnam: Reflections (Justin Time, 2005)

With Betty Carter

- The Audience with Betty Carter (Bet-Car, 1980)
- Whatever Happened to Love? (Bet-Car, 1982)
- Betty Carter (Verve, 1990)
- I'm Yours, You're Mine (Verve, 1996)
- Betty Carter's Finest Hour (Verve, 2003)
- Live in Montreal (Universal, 2004)

With Johnny Griffin

- Call It Whachawana (Galaxy, 1983)
- Live Jazzbuhne Berlin '84 (Amiga, 1984)
- Tough Tenors Back Again! (Storyville, 1997)

With John Hicks

- I'll Give You Something to Remember Me By (Limetree, 1988)
- Naima's Love Song (DIW, 1988)
- East Side Blues (DIW, 1988)
- In the Mix (Landmark, 1995)
- Piece for My Peace (Landmark, 1996)
- Sweet Love of Mine (HighNote, 2006)
- Mind Wine: The Music of John Hicks (Savant, 2008)

With Carmen Lundy

- Good Morning Kiss (BlackHawk, 1985)
- Night and Day (CBS/Sony, 1987)
- This Is Carmen Lundy (Afrasia, 2001)
- Something to Believe in (Justin Time, 2003)
- Jazz and the New Songbook: Live at the Madrid (Afrasia, 2005)
- Come Home (Afrasia, 2007)

With Frank Morgan

- Bop! (Telarc, 1997)
- City Nights: Live at the Jazz Standard (HighNote, 2004)
- Raising the Standard (HighNote, 2005)
- A Night in the Life (HighNote, 2007)

With Bobby Watson

- Estimated Time of Arrival (Roulette, 1978)
- Jewel (Amigo, 1983)
- Love Remains (Red Record, 1987)
- No Question About It (Blue Note, 1988)
- The Year of the Rabbit (Evidence, 1991)
- Bobby Watson Quartet (e.f.s.a., 1997)
- Quiet As It's Kept (Red Record, 1999)
- Live & Learn (Palmetto, 2001)
- From the Heart (Palmetto, 2007)
- Check Cashing Day (Lafiya Music, 2013)
- Made in America (Smoke Sessions, 2017)
- Keepin' It Real (Smoke Sessions, 2020)

With others

- 29th Street Saxophone Quartet, Underground (Antilles, 1991)
- Johanne Blouin, Everything Must Change (Justin Time, 2000)
- Jeri Brown, Zaius (Justin Time, 1998)
- Jeri Brown, I've Got Your Number (Justin Time, 1999)
- Cyrus Chestnut, Midnight Melodies (Smoke Sessions, 2014)
- Chico Freeman, The Unspoken Word (Jazz House, 1994)
- Steve Houben, Steve Houben & Michel Herr Meet Curtis Lundy & Kenny Washington (Jazz Cats, 1983)
- Khan Jamal, Impressions of Coltrane (SteepleChase, 2009)
- Rodney Kendrick, The Colors of Rhythm (Impulse!/(Universal, 2014)
- Idris Muhammad, Right Now (Cannonball, 1998)
- Mark Murphy, A Beautiful Friendship: Remembering Shirley Horn (Gearbox, 2013)
- Steve Nelson, Live Session One (Red Record, 1990)
- Steve Nelson, Live Session Two (Red Record, 1990)
- Pharoah Sanders, Africa (Timeless, 1987)
- Mark Shim, Mind Over Matter (Blue Note, 1998)
- Sonny Simmons, Mixolydis (Marge, 2002)
- Jeffery Smith, Down Here Below (Verve, 1999)
- Clark Terry, Live in Concert (Image, 2001)
