= John Hicks (pianist) =

American jazz pianist, composer, and arranger (1941–2006)

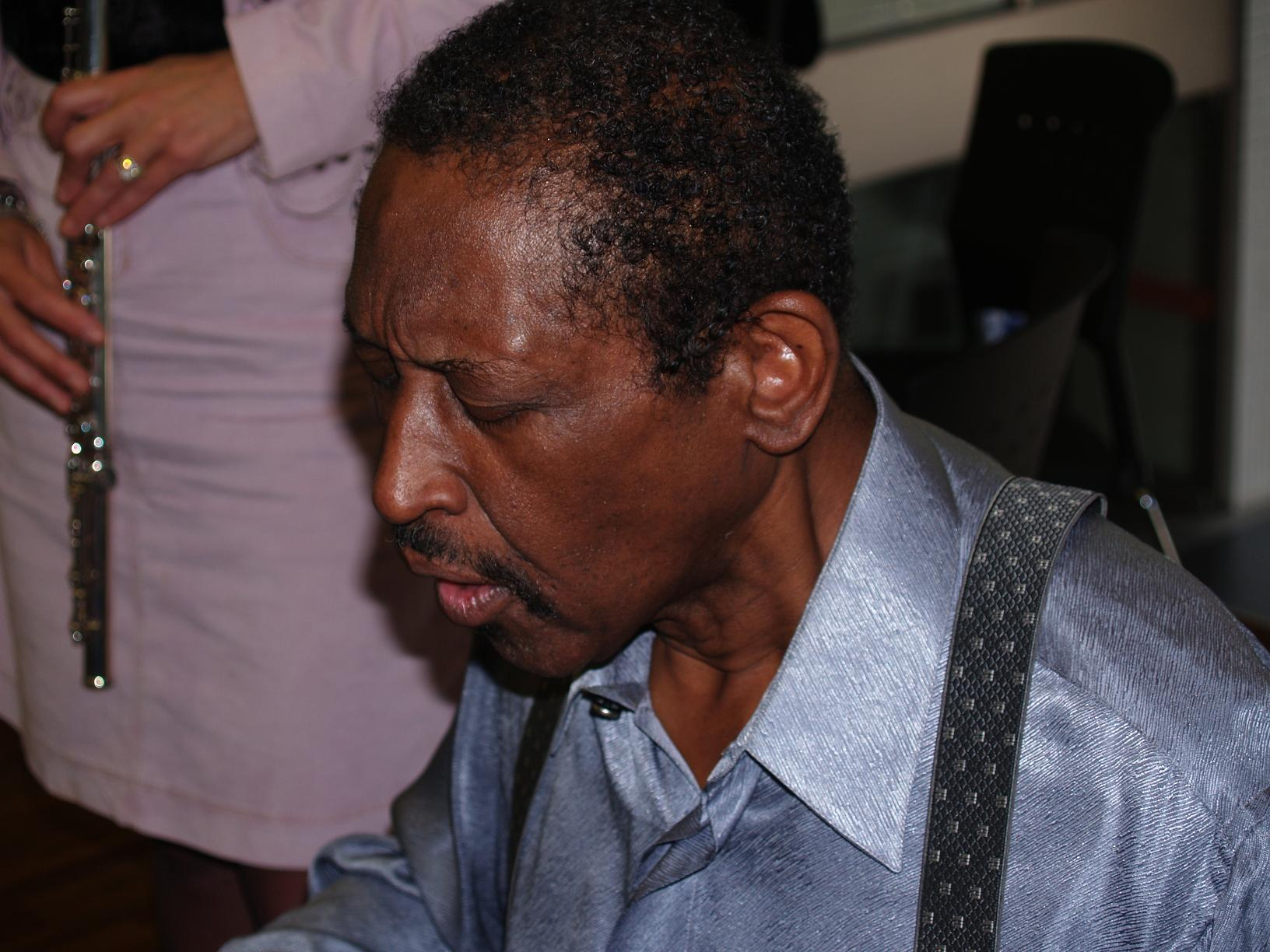
- Hicks in 2006

Background information
- Born: John Josephus Hicks Jr. December 21, 1941; Atlanta, Georgia, U.S.
- Died: May 10, 2006 (aged 64) New York City, New York, U.S.
- Genres: Jazz, hard bop, bebop, free jazz, modal jazz
- Occupations: Musician, composer, arranger, educator
- Instrument: Piano
- Years active: 1958–2006

John Josephus Hicks Jr. (December 21, 1941 – May 10, 2006) was an American jazz pianist, composer, and arranger. He was leader of more than 30 recordings and played as a sideman on more than 300.

After early experiences backing blues musicians, Hicks moved to New York in 1963. He was part of Art Blakey's band for two years, accompanied vocalist Betty Carter from 1965 to 1967, before joining Woody Herman's big band, where he stayed until 1970. Following these associations, Hicks expanded into freer bands, including those of trumpeters Charles Tolliver and Lester Bowie. He rejoined Carter in 1975; the five-year stay brought him more attention and helped to launch his recording career as a leader. He continued to play and record extensively in the United States and internationally. Under his own leadership, his recordings were mostly bebop-influenced, while those for other leaders continued to be in a diversity of styles, including multi-year associations with saxophonists Arthur Blythe, David Murray, David "Fathead" Newman, and Pharoah Sanders.

== Early life ==
Hicks was born in Atlanta, Georgia, on December 21, 1941, the eldest of five children. As a child, he moved with his family around the United States, as his father, Rev. John Hicks Sr, took up jobs with the Methodist church. His family was middle-class: "I was brought up as a decent human being, where you had aspirations and there were expectations", he commented. His mother, Pollie, was his first piano teacher, after he began playing aged six or seven in Los Angeles. He took organ lessons, sang in choirs and tried the violin and trombone. Around the age of 11, once he could read music, Hicks started playing the piano in church.

His development accelerated once his family moved to St. Louis, when Hicks was 14 and he settled on the piano. There, he attended Sumner High School and played in schoolmate Lester Bowie's band, the Continentals, which performed in a variety of musical styles. Hicks cited influences "from Fats Waller to Thelonious Monk to Methodist church hymns", as well as local pianists. He was initially interested in the blues-based compositions of Horace Silver and popular songs such as "I Got Rhythm" and "There Will Never Be Another You", for their easily recognised harmonies.

Hicks worked summer gigs in the southern United States with blues musicians Little Milton and Albert King. His stint with Little Milton provided his first professional work, in 1958; Hicks stated that his playing in a variety of keys improved because the venue's piano was so out of tune that he had to transpose each piece that they played. He studied music in 1958 at Lincoln University in Pennsylvania, where he shared a room with drummer Ronald Shannon Jackson. He also studied for a short time at the Berklee School of Music in Boston before moving to New York in 1963.

== Later life and career ==
=== 1963–80 ===
In New York, Hicks first accompanied singer Della Reese. He then played with Joe Farrell and toured with trombonist Al Grey and tenor saxophonist Billy Mitchell. In 1963 he was also part of saxophonist Pharoah Sanders' first band, and appeared on CBC Television backing vocalist Jimmy Witherspoon. After periods with Kenny Dorham and Joe Henderson, Hicks joined Art Blakey's Jazz Messengers in 1964. His recording debut was with Blakey in November that year on the album 'S Make It. Early in 1965, Hicks toured with Blakey to Japan, France, Switzerland, and England. Blakey encouraged his band members, including Hicks, to compose for the band, although they also played compositions by previous members of the band. He stayed with Blakey for two years, during which time his playing was compared by fellow jazz pianist George Cables with that of McCoy Tyner, for the level of energy displayed and for some of the intervals that they used.

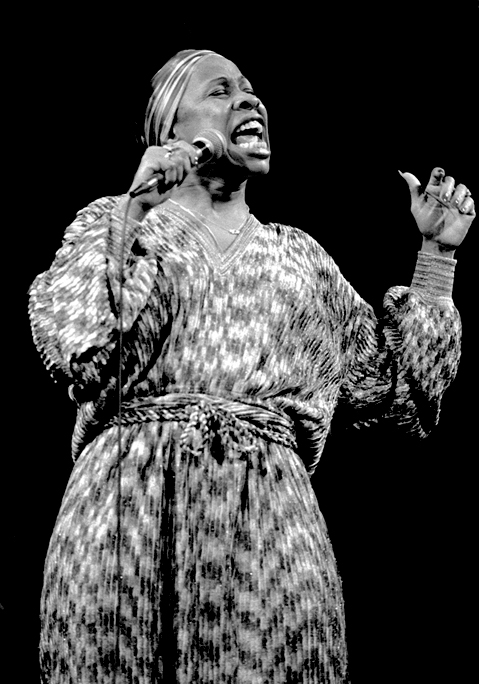
Playing with vocalist Betty Carter in the 1970s gave Hicks more exposure.

In the period 1965 to 1967, Hicks worked on and off with vocalist Betty Carter; her liking for slow ballads helped him develop his sense of time. He then joined Woody Herman's big band, where he stayed until 1970, playing as well as writing arrangements for the band. Hicks also began recording as a sideman with a wide range of leaders – in the 1960s these included Booker Ervin, Hank Mobley, and Lee Morgan – a trend that continued for the remainder of his career. From 1972 to 1973, Hicks taught jazz history and improvisation at Southern Illinois University. From the 1970s, he also played in more avant garde bands, beginning with recordings led by Oliver Lake and performances and recordings in the Netherlands with Charles Tolliver. He played with Blakey again in 1973. Hicks' debut recording as leader was on May 21, 1975, in England. The session resulted in two albums – the trio Hells Bells, with bassist Clint Houston and drummer Cliff Barbaro, and the solo piano Steadfast – that were released by Strata-East Records several years later.

Hicks reunited with Carter in 1975, including accompanying her in a musical play, Don't Call Me Man, that year. After recording with Carter on her Now It's My Turn in 1976, Hicks returned to her band full-time; this raised his profile and led to his own recording – After the Morning. His sideman recording also continued, including with Carter Jefferson (1978) and Chico Freeman (1978–79). Hicks was dismissed in 1980 by Carter, a forceful bandleader, for drinking.

=== 1981–89 ===
Some Other Time in 1981, with bassist Walter Booker and drummer Idris Muhammad, revealed more of Hicks as a composer, and included his best-known song, "Naima's Love Song".

Hicks was the leader of groups from the mid-1970s onwards. His small groups included a quartet featuring Sonny Fortune, Walter Booker, and Jimmy Cobb (1975–82, from 1990); a group featuring the flutist Elise Wood (with or without a drummer); and other groups featuring Gary Bartz, Vincent Herring, saxophonist Craig Handy, bassists Curtis Lundy or Ray Drummond and drummers Idris Muhammad or Victor Lewis. His quintets and sextets included Robin Eubanks and Tolliver (both from 1982), Branford Marsalis (1982–4), Hannibal Peterson (from 1983), Wynton Marsalis (1983–4), Craig Harris (1985–6), Eddie Henderson (1985–6, 1988–90), and Freeman (1985–8). A big band was created in autumn 1982 and revived on occasion subsequently. He played in the UK with Freeman's band in 1989.

From 1983, the flautist Elise Wood was frequently a member of his groups. As a duo, they played mostly jazz, but also some classical music. They formed a business partnership – John Hicks-Elise Wood, Inc. – and toured the US, Europe and Japan in the 1980s.

He also freelanced, including with players such as Arthur Blythe, David Murray, and Pharoah Sanders. During the 1980s, was a sideman for Richie Cole (1980), Arthur Blythe (In the Tradition), David Murray, Hamiet Bluiett, Art Davis, and Pharoah Sanders; recording with as Ricky Ford (1980, 1982), Alvin Queen (1981), Peter Leitch (1984), Herring (1986), and Bobby Watson (1986, 1988). In 1984, he had a big band that rehearsed; a sextet from it played concerts. From around 1989 into the 1990s, he played with the Mingus Dynasty band, including for performances of the symphony Epitaph. He recorded two albums in Japan in 1988 – the trio East Side Blues and the quartet Naima's Love Song, with altoist Bobby Watson added. By now making regular appearances at jazz festivals internationally, Hicks continued to perform in New York City.

=== 1990–2006 ===
Hicks divorced his wife, Olympia, in the early 1990s. The couple had a son and daughter (Jamil Malik and Naima).

Like many jazz musicians in the 1990s, Hicks recorded for multiple labels proposing different recording ideas. The resultant recordings included duo sessions with Jay McShann (1992) and Leitch (1994) for the American Reservoir Records, and several trio-based sessions for Japanese labels – the New York Unit with bassist Richard Davis and drummer Tatsuya Nakamura for Paddle Wheel Records, and the New York Rhythm Machine with bassist Marcus McLaurine and drummer Victor Lewis for Venus Records. These were followed by more trio recordings for other labels – the Keystone Trio of George Mraz and Muhammad for the Milestone label from 1995, and a longer-lasting band with Dwayne Dolphin on bass and Cecil Brooks III on drums for HighNote Records from 1997. The last of these included his most commercially successful recordings, which were tributes to other pianists, including Something to Live For: A Billy Strayhorn Songbook, Impressions of Mary Lou, and Fatha's Day: An Earl Hines Songbook. There were five such albums, all linked to Pittsburgh-associated pianist-composers; the other two were Nightwind: An Erroll Garner Songbook, and Music in the Key of Clark for Sonny Clark. Hicks played on five of David "Fathead" Newman's albums for HighNote, and was described in 2000 as the "HighNote house pianist".

There were also more dates as a sideman for Murray, Leitch, Blythe, Freeman, and Roy Hargrove (1989–90, 1995), Bartz (1990), Lake (1991), Steve Marcus and Valery Ponomarev (both 1993), Nick Brignola, Russell Gunn, and Kevin Mahogany (all 1994), the Mingus Big Band (c1995), Fortune (1996), and Jimmy Ponder (1997). As leader, his repertoire in the 1990s was often of familiar standards. He performed in the UK with the Mingus Big Band in 1999, and played on their album Blues and Politics in the same year. The pianist recorded the seventh instalment of the "Live at Maybeck Recital Hall" series of solo piano concerts which were recorded for Concord Records. He was part of Joe Lovano's quartet in 1998, which led to Hicks being part of the saxophonist's nonet from its formation the following year.

Hicks and Wood married in June 2001. He made a rare recording on organ (Hammond B3) on saxophonist Arthur Blythe's Exhale. Over the last decade or so of Hicks life, he recorded several collaborations with Elise Wood to mixed reviews (Single Petal of a Rose, Trio & Strings, Beautiful Friendship).

Towards the end of his life, Hicks taught at New York University and The New School in New York. Asked about his teaching in January 2006, Hicks replied that "I don't care how advanced my students are, I always start them off with the blues. It all comes from there." Early in 2006, Hicks again played in a big band, this time led by Charles Tolliver. In January and February, he toured Israel, chiefly playing Thelonious Monk compositions. Hicks' final studio recording was On the Wings of an Eagle in March 2006. His last performance was at St Mark's United Methodist Church in New York City a few days before he died. He died on May 10, 2006, from internal bleeding. Hicks is buried at South-View Cemetery in his hometown of Atlanta.

Wood survived him, and has led a band dedicated to his music. In the view of AllMusic reviewer Michael G. Nastos, "Hicks died before reaping the ultimate rewards and high praise he deserved". A collection of his papers and compositions, as well as video and audio recordings, is held by Duke University.

== Playing style ==
Fellow pianist George Cables stated that Hicks "was a very strong and energetic player, and a very warm player, very much part of the tradition". Hicks's playing was sometimes criticized as being insubstantial; The Penguin Guide to Jazz commented that "This [...] is missing the point. Almost always, he is more concerned to work within the dimensions of a song than to go off into the stratosphere."

Hicks had a style of his own, containing a "combination of irresistible creativity and responsiveness [...] encompassing swing, hard bop and the avant garde, and made him a first-call choice for many of the most important American modern jazz groups". A reviewer of a 1993 release, Lover Man: A Tribute to Billie Holiday, commented that Hicks "mastered the technique of shaping a piano chord so it sounds like the rising and falling of a breath". A few years later, another reviewer highlighted the "subtle dynamic shadings" of Hicks's left hand, and his "reverence for melody and a sense of musical destination that gives form to his improvisations." As an accompanist, Hicks played delicately, with carefully voiced chords.

== Compositions and arrangements ==
His compositions "are wandering and melodic, suggestive and malleable yet memorable". He "enjoyed writing arrangements for a quintet or sextet, often, like the finest jazz composers, tailoring parts to specific musicians. In the past, these have included artists of the caliber of Bobby Watson and Vincent Herring; more recently he has been working with Javon Jackson and Elise [Wood]".

== Discography ==
An asterisk (*) after the year indicates that it is the year of release.

=== As leader/co-leader ===
Year recorded	Title	Label	Notes
1975	Hells Bells	Strata-East	Trio, with Clint Houston (bass), Cliff Barbaro (drums); released 1980
1975	Steadfast	Strata-East	Solo piano; released 1980
1979	After the Morning	West 54	Some tracks solo piano; some tracks duo, with Walter Booker (bass); one track trio, with Cliff Barbaro (drums) added
1981	Some Other Time	Theresa	Most tracks trio, with Walter Booker (bass), Idris Muhammad (drums); two tracks solo piano
1982	John Hicks	Theresa	Some tracks solo piano; some tracks trio, with Bobby Hutcherson (vibes), Walter Booker (bass); one track duo, with Olympia Hicks (piano); reissue by Evidence added one track trio, with Olympia Hicks, Idris Muhammad (drums)
1984	In Concert	Theresa	Most tracks trio, with Walter Booker (bass), Idris Muhammad (drums); some tracks quartet, with Elise Wood (flute) or Bobby Hutcherson (vibes) added; in concert
1985	Inc. 1	DIW	Most tracks trio, with Walter Booker (bass), Idris Muhammad (drums); some tracks solo piano
1985	Sketches of Tokyo	DIW	Duo, with David Murray (tenor sax)
1986–87	Two of a Kind	Theresa	Duo, with Ray Drummond (bass)
1987	I'll Give You Something to Remember Me By	Limetree	Trio, with Curtis Lundy (bass), Idris Muhammad (drums)
1985–88	Luminous	Nilva	Some tracks duo, with Elise Wood (flute); some tracks quartet, with Walter Booker (bass), Jimmy Cobb, Alvin Queen (drums, separately) added; some tracks quintet, with Clifford Jordan (tenor sax) added
1988	East Side Blues	DIW	Trio, with Curtis Lundy (bass), Victor Lewis (drums)
1988	Naima's Love Song	DIW	Quartet, with Bobby Watson (alto sax), Curtis Lundy (bass), Victor Lewis (drums)
1989	Oleo	CBS/Sony	As New York Unit; quartet, with George Adams (tenor sax), Richard Davis (bass), Tatsuya Nakamura (drums)
1989	Rhythm-a-Ning	Candid	As Kenny Barron-John Hicks Quartet; quartet, with Kenny Barron (piano), Walter Booker (bass), Jimmy Cobb (drums)
1990	Power Trio	Novus	Trio, with Cecil McBee (bass), Elvin Jones (drums)
1990	Is That So?	Timeless	Trio, with Ray Drummond (bass), Idris Muhammad (drums)
1990	Live at Maybeck Recital Hall, Volume Seven	Concord Jazz	Solo piano; in concert
1990	Blue Bossa	Paddle Wheel	As New York Unit; quartet, with George Adams (tenor sax), Richard Davis (bass), Tatsuya Nakamura (drums)
1991	St. Thomas: Tribute to Great Tenors	Paddle Wheel	As New York Unit; trio, with Richard Davis (bass), Tatsuya Nakamura (drums)
1991–92	Tribute to George Adams	Paddle Wheel	As New York Unit; quartet; some tracks with George Adams, Dan Faulk (tenor sax; separately), Richard Davis (bass), Tatsuya Nakamura (drums); some tracks with Javon Jackson (tenor sax), Santi Debriano (bass), Nakamura (drums)
1992	Friends Old and New	Novus	Most tracks sextet, with Joshua Redman (tenor sax), Clark Terry and Greg Gisbert (trumpet), Ron Carter (bass), Grady Tate (drums); one track septet, with Al Grey (trombone) added
1992	Now's the Time	Paddle Wheel	As New York Unit; quartet, with Marvin "Hannibal" Peterson (trumpet), Richard Davis (bass), Tatsuya Nakamura (drums)
1992	Crazy for You	Red Baron	Trio, with Wilbur Bascomb (bass), Kenny Washington (drums)
1992	Over the Rainbow	Paddle Wheel	As New York Unit; mostly quartet, with Pharoah Sanders (tenor sax), Richard Davis (bass), Tatsuya Nakamura (drums); also released by Evidence as Naima
1992	Single Petal of a Rose	Mapleshade	Some tracks duo, with Elise Wood (flute); some tracks trio or quartet, with Jack Walrath (trumpet), Walter Booker (bass) added
1992	After the Morning	DSM	Solo piano; in concert
1992	The Missouri Connection	Reservoir	Duo, with Jay McShann (piano, vocals); one track solo piano
1992	Blues March: Portrait of Art Blakey	Venus	As New York Rhythm Machine; trio, with Marcus McLaurine (bass), Victor Lewis (drums)
1992	Moanin': Portrait of Art Blakey	Venus	As New York Rhythm Machine; trio, with Marcus McLaurine (bass), Victor Lewis (drums)
1993	Beyond Expectations	Reservoir	Trio, with Ray Drummond (bass), Marvin "Smitty" Smith (drums)
1993	Lover Man: A Tribute to Billie Holiday	Red Baron	Trio, with Ray Drummond (bass), Victor Lewis (drums)
1994	Gentle Rain	Sound Hills	Trio, with Walter Booker (bass), Louis Hayes (drums)
1994	Duality	Reservoir	With Peter Leitch (guitar)
1994	Akari	Apollon	As New York Unit; quartet, with Marvin "Hannibal" Peterson (trumpet), Richard Davis (bass), Tatsuya Nakamura (drums)
1994	In the Mix	Landmark	Quintet, with Vincent Herring (alto sax, soprano sax), Elise Wood (flute), Curtis Lundy (bass), Cecil Brooks III (drums)
1995	Piece for My Peace	Landmark	Some tracks solo piano; one track trio, with Curtis Lundy (bass), Cecil Brooks III (drums); one track quintet, with Bobby Watson and Vincent Herring (alto sax) added; most tracks sextet, with Elise Wood (flute) added; one track duo, with Wood (flute)
1995	Heart Beats	Milestone	As Keystone Trio; with George Mraz (bass), Idris Muhammad (drums)
1997	Newklear Music	Milestone	As Keystone Trio; with George Mraz (bass), Idris Muhammad (drums)
1997	Something to Live For: A Billy Strayhorn Songbook	HighNote	Trio, with Dwayne Dolphin (bass), Cecil Brooks III (drums)
1997	Nightwind: An Erroll Garner Songbook	HighNote	Trio, with Dwayne Dolphin (bass), Cecil Brooks III (drums)
1997	Cry Me a River	Venus	Trio, with Dwayne Burno (bass), Victor Lewis (drums)
1997	Trio + Strings	Mapleshade	With Elise Wood (alto flute), Steve Novosel (bass), Ronnie Burrage (drums), Steve Williams (drums), Rick Schmidt (cello), Debbie Baker (viola), Charles Olive and Tom Ginsberg (violin)
1998	Impressions of Mary Lou	HighNote	Trio, with Dwayne Dolphin (bass), Cecil Brooks III (drums)
1998	Ow!	Paddle Wheel	As New York Unit; quartet, with Javon Jackson (tenor sax), Richard Davis (bass), Tatsuya Nakamura (drums)
1998*	Hicks Time	Passin' Thru	Solo piano
2000	Beautiful Friendship	HiWood	Duo with Elise Wood (flute)
2001	Music in the Key of Clark	HighNote	Trio, with Dwayne Dolphin (bass), Cecil Brooks III (drums)
2003	Fatha's Day: An Earl Hines Songbook	HighNote	Trio, with Dwayne Dolphin (bass), Cecil Brooks III (drums)
2003*	Besame Mucho	IJE	As New York Unit; trio, with Santi Debriano (bass), Tatsuya Nakamura (drums)
2005–06	Twogether	HighNote	Most tracks duo, with Frank Morgan (alto sax); some tracks solo piano
2006	On the Wings of an Eagle	Chesky	Trio, with Buster Williams (bass), Louis Hayes (drums)
2006	I Remember You	HighNote	Solo piano; in concert
2006	Sweet Love of Mine	HighNote	Some tracks quartet, with Javon Jackson (tenor sax), Curtis Lundy (bass), Victor Jones (drums); some tracks quintet, with Elise Wood (flute) added; some tracks sextet, with Ray Mantilla (percussion) added

=== As sideman ===
Year recorded	Leader	Title	Label
1998	Eric Alexander	Solid!	Milestone
2005	Eric Alexander	Sunday in New York	Venus
1989	Ray Anderson	What Because	Gramavision
1996	Ray Appleton	Killer Ray Rides Again	Sharp Nine
1998	Harold Ashby	Just for You	Mapleshade
2001	Billy Bang	Vietnam: The Aftermath	Justin Time
2004	Billy Bang	Vietnam: Reflections	Justin Time
1990	Gary Bartz	West 42nd Street	Candid
2001	Mickey Bass	Live at the Jazz Corner of the World	Early Bird
1986	Abdul Zahir Batin	Live At The Jazz Cultural Theater	Cadence Jazz
2004	Roni Ben-Hur	Signature	Reservoir
1993	Dick Berk	East Coast Stroll	Reservoir
1999	Alex Blake	Now Is the Time: Live at the Knitting Factory	Bubble Core
1964	Art Blakey	'S Make It	Limelight
1965	Art Blakey	Are You Real	Moon
1965	Art Blakey	Soul Finger	Limelight
1965	Art Blakey	Hold On, I'm Coming	Limelight
1972	Art Blakey	Child's Dance	Prestige
2001*	Johanne Blouin	Everything Must Change	Justin Time
1983	Hamiet Bluiett	Bearer of the Holy Flame	Black Fire
1984	Hamiet Bluiett	Ebu	Soul Note
1980	Arthur Blythe	Illusions	Columbia
1981	Arthur Blythe	Blythe Spirit	Columbia
1988*	Arthur Blythe	Basic Blythe	Columbia
1993	Arthur Blythe	Retroflection	Enja
1993	Arthur Blythe	Calling Card	Enja
2001	Arthur Blythe	Blythe Byte	Savant
2002	Arthur Blythe	Exhale	Savant
1990	Bob Thiele Collective	Sunrise Sunset	Red Baron
2005–06	Richard Boulger	Blues Twilight	B-1 Music
1974	Lester Bowie	Fast Last!	Muse
1991	Teresa Brewer	Memories of Louis	Red Baron
1994*	Nick Brignola	Like Old Times	Reservoir
2000	Cecil Brooks III	Live at Sweet Basil	Savant
2000	Cecil Brooks III	Live at Sweet Basil, Volume Two	Savant
1998	Jeri Brown	Zaius	Justin Time
1998	Jeri Brown	I've Got Your Number	Justin Time
1976	Betty Carter	Now It's My Turn	Roulette
1979	Betty Carter	The Audience with Betty Carter	Bet-Car
1992	Betty Carter	It's Not About the Melody	Verve
1992	Betty Carter	The Music Never Stops	Blue Engine
2003	James Carter	Gardenias for Lady Day	Columbia
1989	Michael Carvin	Revelation	Muse
1980	Richie Cole	Side by Side	Muse
1998	Larry Coryell	Monk, Trane, Miles & Me	HighNote
2000	Larry Coryell	Inner Urge	HighNote
1985	Art Davis	Life	Soul Note
2001*	Richard Davis	The Bassist: Homage to Diversity	Palmetto
1987*	Paquito D'Rivera	Manhattan Burn	Columbia
1966	Booker Ervin	Structurally Sound	Pacific Jazz
1980	Ricky Ford	Flying Colors	Muse
1982*	Ricky Ford	Interpretations	Muse
1975	Sonny Fortune	Awakening	Horizon
1996	Sonny Fortune	From Now On	Blue Note
1999	Sonny Fortune	In the Spirit of John Coltrane	Shanachie
1978	Chico Freeman	The Outside Within	India Navigation
1978–79	Chico Freeman	Spirit Sensitive	India Navigation
1978–79	Chico Freeman	Still Sensitive	India Navigation
1989	Chico Freeman and Arthur Blythe	Luminous	Jazz House
1998	Mac Gollehon	Live at the Blue Note	Half Note
1994	Thurman Green	Dance of the Night Creatures	Mapleshade
1971	Earl Grubbs and Carl Grubbs	The Visitors - Earl Grubbs - Carl Grubbs	Cobblestone
1994	Russell Gunn	Young Gunn	Muse
1990	Roy Hargrove	Diamond in the Rough	Novus/RCA
1995	Roy Hargrove	Family	Verve
1997	Roy Hargrove	Habana	Verve
1986*	John Hazilla	Chicplacity	Cadence Jazz
1994*	Norman Hedman	Flight of the Spirit	Monad
1968	Woody Herman	Light My Fire	Cadet
1969	Woody Herman	Heavy Exposure	Cadet
1986–89	Vincent Herring	American Experience	Nimbus
1978	Carter Jefferson	The Rise of Atlantis	Timeless Muse
1993*	Sofia Laiti	Inspira	Midnight Sun
1971	Oliver Lake	Ntu: Point from Which Creation Begins	Arista
1991	Oliver Lake	Again and Again	Gramavision
1984–88	Peter Leitch	Exhilaration	Reservoir
1990*	Peter Leitch	Mean What You Say	Concord Jazz
1992*	Peter Leitch	From Another Perspective	Concord Jazz
1993	Peter Leitch	A Special Rapport	Reservoir
1995	Peter Leitch	Colours and Dimensions	Reservoir
1999	Peter Leitch	California Concert	Jazz House
2005	Amy London	When I Look in Your Eyes	Motéma Music
1999	Joe Lovano	52nd Street Themes	Blue Note
2002	Joe Lovano	On This Day ... Live at The Vanguard	Blue Note
2005	Joe Lovano	Streams of Expression	Blue Note
1999*	Curtis Lundy	Against All Odds	Justin Time
2001	Curtis Lundy	Purpose	Justin Time
1994	Kevin Mahogany	Songs and Moments	Enja
1993	Steve Marcus	Smile	Red Baron
1993	Chris McNulty	Time for Love	Amosaya
1989	Charles Mingus	Epitaph	Columbia
1997*	Mingus Big Band	Live in Time	Dreyfus
1999*	Mingus Big Band	Blues and Politics	Dreyfus
2004	Mingus Big Band	I Am Three	Sunnyside
1991*	Mingus Dynasty	Next Generation Performs Charles Mingus' Brand New Compositions	Columbia
1966	Blue Mitchell and Sonny Red	Baltimore 1966	Uptown
1967	Hank Mobley	Hi Voltage	Blue Note
1968	Lee Morgan	Taru	Blue Note
1968	Lee Morgan	Live In Baltimore: 1968	Fresh Sound
1997	Bob Mover	Television	Unidisc
1980s	Tisziji Munoz	Visiting This Planet	Anami
1980s	Tisziji Munoz	Hearing Voices	Anami
1983	David Murray	Morning Song	Black Saint
1986	David Murray	I Want to Talk About You	Black Saint
1988	David Murray	Ming's Samba	Portrait
1991	David Murray	Fast Life	DIW/Columbia
1991	David Murray	Ballads for Bass Clarinet	DIW
1991	David Murray	David Murray/James Newton Quintet	DIW
1992	David Murray	MX	Red Baron
1993	David Murray	Jazzosaurus Rex	Red Baron
1993	David Murray	Saxmen	Red Baron
1993	David Murray	For Aunt Louise	DIW
1993	David Murray	Love and Sorrow	DIW
2000	David Murray	Like a Kiss that Never Ends	Justin Time
1998	David "Fathead" Newman	Chillin'	HighNote
2000	David "Fathead" Newman	Keep the Spirits Singing	HighNote
2002	David "Fathead" Newman	The Gift	HighNote
2003	David "Fathead" Newman	Song for the New Man	HighNote
2004	David "Fathead" Newman	I Remember Brother Ray	HighNote
1997	Jimmy Ponder	James Street	HighNote
1998	Jimmy Ponder	Ain't Misbehavin'	HighNote
1998	Jimmy Ponder	A Guitar Christmas	HighNote
1993	Valery Ponomarev	Live at Sweet Basil	Reservoir
1981	Alvin Queen	Ashanti	Nilva
1985	Alvin Queen	Jammin' Uptown	Nilva
1995	Michael Rabinowitz	Gabrielle's Balloon	Jazz Focus
1990	The Reunion Legacy Band	The Legacy	Early Bird
1979	Pharoah Sanders	Journey to the One	Theresa
1981	Pharoah Sanders	Rejoice	Theresa
1981	Pharoah Sanders	Pharoah Sanders Live...	Theresa
1987	Pharoah Sanders	Africa	Timeless
1987	Pharoah Sanders	A Prayer Before Dawn	Theresa
1984	Bill Saxton	Beneath the Surface	Nilva
1995	Archie Shepp	Blue Ballads	Venus
1996	Archie Shepp	True Ballads	Venus
1998	Archie Shepp	True Blue	Venus
1996	Archie Shepp	Something to Live For	Timeless
1966	Sonny Simmons	Staying on the Watch	ESP
1999	James Spaulding	Escapade	HighNote
1972	Charles Tolliver	Live at the Loosdrecht Jazz Festival	Strata-East
1973	Charles Tolliver	Live at the Captain's Cabin	Reel to Real
2001*	Barry Wallenstein	Tony's Blues	Cadence Jazz
1997*	Frederick Washington, Jr.	Lilac: Volume 1	Passin' Thru
1986	Bobby Watson	Love Remains	Red
1988*	Bobby Watson	No Question About It	Blue Note
2006*	Ed Wiley, Jr.	About the Soul	Swing
2005	Steve Williams	New Incentive	Elabeth
1995	Dave Young	Two by Two: Volume One	Justin Time
1996*	Dave Young	Side by Side, Volume Three	Justin Time
