= Luminous (John Hicks and Elise Wood album) =

Album by pianist John Hicks and flautist Elise Wood

Studio album by John Hicks, Elise Wood
- Recorded: July 31, 1985, September 1988, New York City
- Genre: Jazz
- Label: Nilva
- Producer: John Hicks, Elise Wood

John Hicks chronology
I'll Give You Something to Remember Me By (1987)	Luminous (1985–88)	East Side Blues (1988)

Luminous is an album by pianist John Hicks and flautist Elise Wood.

== Recording and music ==
The first recording session was on July 31, 1985, in New York City. In addition to John Hicks on piano and Elise Wood on flute, bassist Walter Booker and drummer Jimmy Cobb played on three tracks, and tenor saxophonist Clifford Jordan played on two. For the second session, in the same city in September 1988, Booker and drummer Alvin Queen played on two tracks. On the tracks, Hicks "has a reflective, lyrical bent".

== Releases ==
The album was originally released by Nilva Records. It was reissued by Evidence Music, with four bonus tracks from the two original recording sessions added.

== Reception ==
The Penguin Guide to Jazz commented that the album was "Attractive but disconcertingly low-key".

Professional ratings
Review scores
Source	Rating
AllMusic	4/5 stars
The Penguin Guide to Jazz	3/4 stars

== Track listing ==
=== Original release ===
1. "Luminous"
2. "Yemenja"
3. "Ojos De Rojo"
4. "Blue in Green"
5. "Motivation"
6. "Expectation"
7. "Chelsea Bridge"

=== Reissue ===
For the reissue, four tracks were added to the seven on the original album:

8. "Osaka"
9. "I'm Getting Sentimental Over You"
10. "Upper Manhattan Medical Group"
11. "Once in a While"

== Personnel ==
- John Hicks – piano
- Elise Wood – flute
- Clifford Jordan – tenor sax (tracks 1, 2, 8)
- Walter Booker – bass (tracks 1–3, 5, 6, 8, 9, 11)
- Jimmy Cobb – drums (tracks 1–3, 8, 9)
- Alvin Queen – drums (tracks 5, 6)
