= Journey, Man! =

Studio album by Jack Walrath & Hard Corps
- Released: 1996
- Recorded: November 28–29, 1995
- Studio: Eastside, Sound, New York, NY
- Genre: Jazz
- Length: 59:59
- Label: Evidence; ECD 221502
- Producer: Jack Walrath

Jack Walrath chronology
Serious Hang (1992)	Journey, Man! (1996)	Hip Gnosis (1996)

Journey, Man! is an album by trumpeter Jack Walrath which was recorded in 1995 and released on the Evidence label in 1996.

== Reception ==
Professional ratings
Review scores
Source	Rating
AllMusic	4/5 stars

The AllMusic review by Alex Henderson stated "One of the many impressive albums he provided in the '90s, Journey, Man! finds the trumpeter leading a band he called Hard Corps and employs a cast of players you'd expect to find on a hard bop date ... And in fact, hard bop and post-bop are exactly what the sextet plays ... But Walrath isn't one to limit himself creatively, and providing an abundance of Jazz Messengers-influenced arrangements doesn't prevent him from taking it "outside" ... Although not as daring as some of Walrath's other albums, Journey, Man! is a rewarding date from a trumpeter who refuses to be predictable".

== Track listing ==
All compositions by Jack Walrath

1. "Bouncin' with Ballholzka" – 8:08
2. "Ancient Intrigues" – 6:47
3. "When Love Has Gone (It Comes Out Like This)" – 6:06
4. "Pete's Steps" – 8:07
5. "(I Wanna Be) Out There Somewhere" – 4:51
6. "Butt! (Tails from the Backside)" – 8:19
7. "Sarah Hurts" – 3:36
8. "Song of Everywhen" – 11:27
9. "Orange Has Me Down" – 2:38

== Personnel ==
- Jack Walrath – trumpet
- Craig Handy – tenor saxophone, soprano saxophone
- Bobby Watson – alto saxophone
- Kenny Drew Jr. – piano
- Ray Drummond – bass
- Victor Lewis – drums
