= Victor Lewis =

American jazz drummer (born 1950)

- Born: May 20, 1950 (age 76); Omaha, Nebraska, U.S.
- Genre: Jazz
- Occupation: Musician
- Instrument: Drums
- Years active: 1974–present
- Website: victorlewisondrums.com

Victor Lewis (born May 20, 1950) is an American jazz drummer, composer, and educator.

== Early life ==
Victor Lewis was born on May 20, 1950, in Omaha, Nebraska. His father, Richard Lewis, who played saxophone and mother, Camille, a pianist-vocalist were both classically trained musicians who performed with many of the "territory bands" that toured the midwest in the forties. Consequently, Victor grew up with jazz as well as popular and European classical music at home. He would also go with his father to hear touring big bands as they passed through Omaha, such as Duke Ellington, Count Basie and Woody Herman.

Victor started studying music when he was ten and a half years old. Too small for the acoustic bass, he began on cello, but switched to the drums a year and a half later inspired by the drum line marching in holiday parades. As part of his formal studies, he also studied classical piano.

== Career ==
By the time he was 15, Victor began playing drums professionally on the local scene. As one of the few drummers who could read music, he jumped ahead of many of the older musicians for calls on commercial jobs. His big band jazz drumming style was greatly changed after hearing a record of Tony Williams with Miles Davis' Quintet. In addition to Williams, he was greatly influenced by the jazz combo styles of Art Blakey, Kenny Clarke, Max Roach and Philly Joe Jones. He started his own small group to play around town and quickly ascended to playing with nationally known jazz musicians, the first of which was accompanying Hank Crawford in Omaha.

In 1974 Lewis moved to Manhattan, Victor's first gig there was a night at Boomer's with bassist Buster Williams, where he met trumpeter Woody Shaw. Lewis joined the trumpeter's band, becoming a steady member, and a just a few months later he made his recording debut on Shaw's classic, The Moontrane. In the early seventies, the fusion and pop-jazz scenes were becoming popular. Quickly adapting, the drummer was soon recording with Joe Farrell, Earl Klugh, Hubert Laws, Carla Bley and David Sanborn. On his first outing with Sanborn, Lewis recorded his own compositions, "Seventh Avenue" and "Sophisticated Squaw" (a/k/a "Agaya") and later "The Legend of the Cheops."

In 1980, Lewis left Shaw's group to join Stan Getz, in a long collaboration that lasted until the saxophonist's death in 1991. Throughout the eighties, Lewis was one of jazz's busiest freelancers, touring and recording with, among others, Kenny Barron, Art Farmer, J.J. Johnson, Mike Stern, John Stubblefield, Grover Washington Jr., The Manhattan Jazz Quintet, Bobby Hutcherson and Bobby Watson.

As an educator, Lewis has contributed as a freelance instructor with The New School University Jazz School-Mannes Music School Jazz Program in New York City and appears in drum clinics around the world. In 2003 Lewis joined the faculty of Rutgers University in New Brunswick, NJ where he teaches drummers and coaches jazz combos.

In the press, there have been several feature articles about him in publications such as Downbeat, The Wire, Jazz Times and Modern Drummer.

== Discography ==
=== As leader/co-leader ===
- Family Portrait (AudioQuest, 1992)
- Know It Today, Know It Tomorrow (Red, 1993)
- Ease On with John Abercrombie, Arthur Blythe, Jeff Palmer (AudioQuest, 1993)
- Eeeyyess!! (Enja, 1997)
- Three Way Conversations (Red, 1997)

=== As a member ===
The New York Rhythm Machine
With John Hicks and Marcus McLaurine

- Blues March: Portrait of Art Blakey (Venus, 1992)
- Moanin': Portrait of Art Blakey (Venus, 1992)

=== As sideman ===
With Kenny Barron

- What If? (Enja, 1986)
- Live at Fat Tuesdays (Enja, 1988)
- Quickstep (Enja, 1991)
- The Moment (Reservoir, 1991)
- Other Places (Verve, 1993)
- Sambao (Gitanes/EmArcy, 1992)
- Things Unseen (Verve, 1997)

With Andy Bey

- Shades of Bey (12th Street/Evidence, 1998)
- Tuesdays in Chinatown (12th Street/N2K Encoded Music, 2001)

With Carla Bley

- Heavy Heart (Watt, 1983)
- Night-Glo (Watt, 1985)
- Sextet (Watt, 1987)
- The Very Big Carla Bley Band (Watt, 1991)
- 4 x 4 (Watt, 2000)
- Live in Montreal (Universal, 2003)[DVD-Video]

With Paul Bley

- Speachless (SteepleChase, 1995)
- Reality Check (SteepleChase, 1996)

With George Cables

- Senorita de Aranjuez (Meldec Jazz, 2001)
- Looking for the Light (MuseFX, 2003)
- A Letter to Dexter (Kind of Blue, 2006)
- My Muse (HighNote, 2012)
- Icons & Influences (HighNote, 2014)
- In Good Company (HighNote, 2015)
- The George Cables Songbook (HighNote, 2016)

With James Carter

- Gardenias for Lady Day (Columbia, 2003)
- Present Tense (EmArcy, 2008)

With Stan Getz

- The Dolphin (Concord Jazz, 1981)
- Pure Getz (Concord Jazz, 1982)
- Line for Lyons with Chet Baker (Sonet, 1983)
- Voyage (BlackHawk, 1986)
- The Stockholm Concert (Sonet, 1989)
- Anniversary! (EmArcy, 1989)
- Billy Highstreet Samba (EmArcy, 1990)
- Serenity (EmArcy, 1991)
- Spring Is Here (Concord Jazz, 1992)
- Stan Getz Quartet Live in Paris (Dreyfus Jazz, 1996)

With John Hicks

- Naima's Love Song featuring Bobby Watson (DIW, 1988)
- East Side Blues (DIW, 1988)
- Lover Man: A Tribute to Billie Holiday (Red Baron, 1993)
- Cry Me a River (Venus, 1997)

With J. J. Johnson

- Standards (EmArcy, 1991)
- Heroes (Verve, 1998)

With Carmen Lundy

- Good Morning Kiss (BlackHawk, 1986)
- This Is Carmen Lundy (Afrasia, 2001)
- Something to Believe In (Justin Time, 2003)
- Jazz and the New Songbook: Live at the Madrid (Afrasia, 2005)
- Night and Day (Afrasia, 2011)

With Charles McPherson

- First Flight Out (Araesque, 1994)
- Manhattan Nocturne (Arabesque, 1998)

With David Murray

- Lucky Four (Tutu, 1988)
- MX (Red Baron, 1992)

With David Sanborn

- David Sanborn (Warner Bros., 1976)
- Promise Me the Moon (Warner Bros., 1977)

With Woody Shaw

- The Moontrane (Muse, 1975)
- Love Dance (Muse, 1975)
- Rosewood (Columbia, 1977)
- Stepping Stones: Live at the Village Vanguard (Columbia, 1978)
- Woody III (Columbia, 1979)
- The Iron Men (Muse, 1980) – rec. 1977
- For Sure! (Columbia, 1980)

With John Stubblefield

- Bushman Song (Enja, 1986)
- Countin' on the Blues (Enja, 1987)

With Harvie Swartz

- Urban Earth (Gramavision, 1985)
- Smart Moves (Gramavision, 1986)

With Steve Turre

- Rhythm Within (Antilles, 1995)
- Steve Turre (Verve, 1997)
- TNT (Trombone-n-Tenor) (Telarc, 2001)

With Bobby Watson & Horizon

- No Question About It (Blue Note, 1988)
- Post-Motown Bop (Blue Note, 1990)
- The Inventor (Blue Note, 1990)
- Present Tense (Columbia, 1992)
- Midwest Shuffle (Columbia, 1994)

With others

- George Adams, Nightingale (Blue Note, 1989)
- Don Alias, Grey (Quinton, 2001)
- Franco Ambrosetti, Live at the Blue Note (Enja, 1993)
- Gary Bartz, Shadows (Timeless, 1991)
- Roni Ben-Hur and Nilson Matta, Mojave (Motéma, 2011)
- Anthony Braxton, Seven Standards 1985, Vol. 1 & 2 (Magenta, 1985 & 1986)
- Cyrus Chestnut, A Million Colors in Your Mind (HighNote, 2015)
- Marc Copland, Crosstalk (Pirouet, 2011)
- Eddie "Lockjaw" Davis, The Heavy Hitter (Muse, 1979)
- Art Farmer, Blame It on My Youth (Contemporary, 1988)
- Barry Finnerty, Straight Ahead (Arabesque, 1994)
- Dexter Gordon, Sophisticated Giant (Columbia, 1977)
- G.org featuring Randy Brecker and Chuck Loeb, A New Kind of Blue (A Nest of Eggs, 2004)
- Steve Grossman, Perspective (Atlantic, 1979)
- Mark Helias, The Current Set (Enja, 1987)
- Bobby Hutcherson, Cruisin' the 'Bird (Landmark, 1988)
- Jonny King, Above All (Sunnyside, 2012)
- Oliver Lake, Heavy Spirits (Freedom/Arista, 1975)
- The Hubert Laws Group, A Hero Ain't Nothin' but a Sandwich (Original Motion Picture Soundtrack) (Columbia, 1978)
- Dave Liebman, Setting the Standard (Red, 1993)
- Abbey Lincoln, A Turtle's Dream (Gitanes/Verve, 1994)
- Helen Merrill, Brownie: Homage to Clifford Brown (Verve, 1994)
- Karlheinz Miklin, Next Page (SOS-Music, 1991)
- Ralph Moore, Furthermore (Landmark, 1990)
- Judy Niemack, Blue Nights (BluJazz, 2007) featuring Jeanfrançois Prins, Gary Bartz, Jim McNeely
- Jeanfrançois Prins, El Gaucho (Challenge, 2012) featuring Rich Perry
- Charlie Rouse, Soul Mates (Uptown, 1993) featuring Sahib Shihab
- George Russell's New York Band, Live in an American Time Spiral (Soul Note, 1982)
- Joe Sample, Invitation (Warner Bros., 1993)
- Lew Soloff, With a Song in My Heart (Milestone, 1998)
- Charles Sullivan, Kamau (Arabesque, 1995)
- Steve Swallow, Carla (Xtra Watt, 1987)
- Lew Tabackin, Desert Lady (Concord, 1989)
- Charles Tolliver, With Love (Blue Note, 2006)
- Tom Varner, Jazz French Horn (Soul Note, 1985)
- Jack Walrath, Journey, Man! (Evidence 1995)
- Cedar Walton, Composer (Astor Place, 1996)
- Randy Weston, Khepera (Verve, 2000)
- Larry Willis, Let's Play (SteepleChase, 1991)
