= Gentle Rain =

Gentle Rain may refer to:

- "The Gentle Rain", a 1965 bossa nova song composed by Luis Bonfá
- Gentle Rain (Irene Kral album), 1977
- Gentle Rain (John Hicks album), 1994
- The Gentle Rain (film), a 1966 American-Brazilian drama film
