= Beatitudes (album) =

Studio album by Bobby Watson and Curtis Lundy
- Released: 1983
- Recorded: April 11, 1983
- Studio: Van Gelder Studio, Englewood Cliffs, New Jersey
- Genre: Jazz
- Length: 59:20
- Label: New Note; KM 11867
- Producer: Bobby Watson, Curtis Lundy

Bobby Watson chronology
All Because Of You (1979)	Beatitudes (1983)	Advance (1985)

Curtis Lundy chronology
Beatitudes (1983)	Just Be Yourself (1987)

Beatitudes is an album by saxophonist and composer Bobby Watson and double bassist Curtis Lundy. It was recorded on April 11, 1983, at Van Gelder Studio in Englewood Cliffs, New Jersey, and was released on vinyl later that year by New Note Records. In 1997, the album was reissued on CD by Evidence Music. On the album, which features five Watson originals, a Lundy composition, and Gigi Gryce's "Minority", Watson and Lundy are joined by pianist Mulgrew Miller and drummer Kenny Washington.

== Reception ==
Professional ratings
Review scores
Source	Rating
AllMusic	3/5 stars
MusicHound Jazz	3.5/5 stars
The Penguin Guide to Jazz Recordings	3/4 stars

In a review for AllMusic, Scott Yanow wrote: "Watson already had a distinctive sound at this early stage and his solos in the advanced hard bop setting are enthusiastic and fairly original."

Sid Gribetz of JazzTimes stated: "The music here is crackling and sharp... Watson plays with a deep strong tone and an attack full of verve and bite... Lundy was at that time already a long-term associate of Watson's, and their empathy is evident on the recording... the songs are more than just tunes to blow on-they are lyrical and coherent, lending to fine playing that remains memorable."

== Track listing ==
1. "To See Her Face" (Bobby Watson) – 5:55
2. "Karita" (Bobby Watson) – 6:25
3. "Jewel" (Bobby Watson) – 6:03
4. "E.T.A." (Bobby Watson) – 3:31
5. "Minority" (Gigi Gryce) – 3:46
6. "Orange Blossom" (Curtis Lundy) – 8:00
7. "Beatitudes" (Bobby Watson) – 8:22

Additional tracks on CD reissue

1. "On the One" (Bobby Watson) – 4:19
2. "Karita (alternate take)" (Bobby Watson) – 7:26
3. "To See Her Face (alternate take)" (Bobby Watson) – 5:28

== Personnel ==
- Bobby Watson – alto saxophone
- Curtis Lundy – double bass
- Mulgrew Miller – piano
- Kenny Washington – drums
