= Jim Hartog =

American jazz musician

James Paul Hartog (born March 10, 1950, San Mateo, California) is an American jazz saxophonist, known primarily as a baritone saxophonist.

Hartog attended Grinnell College and the New England Conservatory of Music, taking a bachelor's from the latter in 1980. He played with Tom Varner in the late 1970s and with Jaki Byard from 1977 to 1982, and was a founder of the 29th Street Saxophone Quartet, playing with the group from 1982 to 1996. From 1985 to 1989 he also worked as an A&R man and producer for New Note Records. Other performance associations include Karl Berger, Bobby Watson, Carmen Lundy, Keshavan Maslak, East Down Septet, Mingus Big Band, and the Vanguard Jazz Orchestra. He led a quartet in the 1990s with Terell Stafford, Steve Johns, Essiet Essiet, and Pete McCann as sidemen.
