= Blue Bossa (New York Unit album) =

Studio album by New York Unit
- Recorded: December 16, 1990
- Studio: Music Inn Studio, Tokyo
- Genre: Jazz
- Length: 57:50
- Label: Paddle Wheel; KICJ 55

John Hicks chronology
Live at Maybeck Recital Hall, Volume Seven (1990)	Blue Bossa (1990)	St. Thomas: Tribute to Great Tenors (1991)

New York Unit chronology
Oleo (1989)	Blue Bossa (1990)	St. Thomas: Tribute to Great Tenors (1991)

Blue Bossa is an album by New York Unit, consisting of tenor saxophonist George Adams, pianist John Hicks, bassist Richard Davis, and drummer Tatsuya Nakamura which was recorded in 1990 and released in Japan.

== Recording and music ==
The album was recorded at Music Inn Studio, Tokyo, on December 16, 1990. The musicians were George Adams (tenor sax), John Hicks (piano), Richard Davis (bass), and Tatsuya Nakamura (drums). "A Minor Melody" is performed by Hicks and Davis, with the bassist playing both arco and pizzicato.

== Release ==
Blue Bossa was released by Paddle Wheel Records. Bellaphon were licensed to release it in Europe.

== Reception ==
Professional ratings
Review scores
Source	Rating
AllMusic	4/5 stars

The AllMusic review by Ken Dryden stated "Things immediately gel during the brisk take of Kenny Dorham's "Blue Bossa," with Adams seemingly energized by the strong rhythm section. The quartet offers a lyrical performance of "Monk's Mood" followed by Sir Roland Hanna's classically flavored "A Minor Melody," which showcases Davis playing both arco and pizzicato bass, backed by Hicks in a duo setting. Adams' hard bop vehicle sounds like it would be a perfect set-closer for a live date. They wrap their studio date with an explosive rendition of "Take the 'A' Train."".

== Track listing ==
1. "Blue Bossa" (Kenny Dorham) – 8:40
2. "The Everywhere Calypso" (Sonny Rollins) – 7:40
3. "I Thought About You" (Jimmy Van Heusen, Johnny Mercer) – 8:01
4. "Monk's Mood" (Thelonious Monk) – 8:49
5. "A Minor Melody" (Roland Hanna) – 7:15
6. "Blues for Moment" (George Adams) – 5:09
7. "Misako and Beautiful Shores" (Richard Davis) – 5:17
8. "Take the "A" Train" (Billy Strayhorn) – 6:59

== Personnel ==
- George Adams – tenor sax
- John Hicks – piano
- Richard Davis – bass
- Tatsuya Nakamura – drums
