= Ray Drummond =

American jazz bassist and educator (1946–2025)

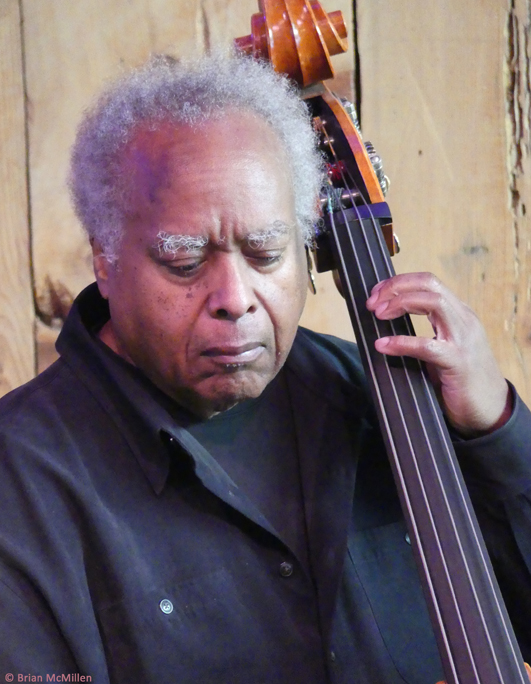
- Drummond at Bach Dancing & Dynamite Society, Half Moon Bay, California, 2017

Background information
- Born: Raymond Charles Drummond; November 23, 1946; Brookline, Massachusetts, U.S.
- Died: November 1, 2025 (aged 78) Teaneck, New Jersey, U.S.
- Genres: Jazz
- Occupations: Musician; music educator
- Instrument: Double bass
- Labels: Nilva; Theresa; Criss Cross; DMP; Arabesque

Raymond Charles Drummond (November 23, 1946 – November 1, 2025) was an American jazz bassist and teacher. He also had an MBA from Stanford University, hence his linkage to the Stanford Jazz Workshop. He can be heard on hundreds of albums and co-led The Drummonds with Renee Rosnes and Billy Drummond (not related).

Drummond was a resident of Teaneck, New Jersey, since 1980 with his wife, Susan, and his daughter, Maya.

He was the elder brother of David Drummond, who served as senior vice president, corporate development and chief legal officer of Google, until his retirement in 2020.

Drummond died on November 1, 2025, at the age of 78.

== Discography ==
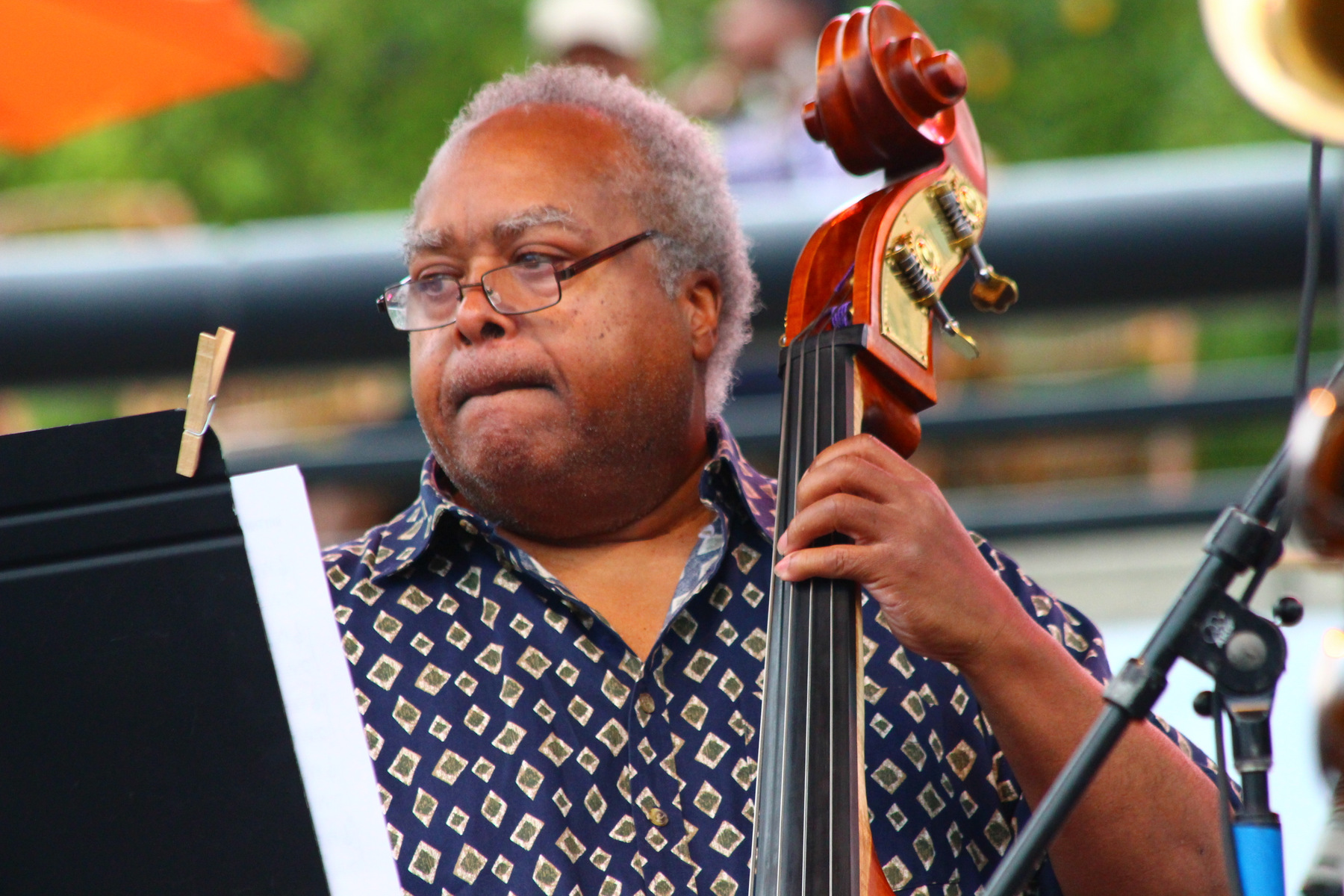
Drummond at the 2013 Detroit Jazz Festival

=== As leader/co-leader ===
- 1984: Susanita (Nilva) with Manny Boyd, Branford Marsalis, John Hicks, Alvin Queen
- 1989: Two of a Kind (Theresa) with John Hicks
- 1989: Camera in a Bag (Criss Cross) with David Newman, Kenny Barron, Steve Nelson, Marvin Smith
- 1989: One to One with Bill Mays (DMP, 1990)
- 1990: One to One 2 with Bill Mays (DMP, 1991)
- 1991: The Essence with Hank Jones, Billy Higgins (DMP, 1991)
- 1992: Excursion (Arabesque, 1993)
- 1994: Continuum (Arabesque, 1994)
- 1995: Vignettes (Arabesque, 1996)
- 1997: 1-2-3-4 (Arabesque, 1999)

=== As sideman ===
With Bill Barron

- Variations in Blue (Muse, 1983)
- The Next Plateau (Muse, 1989)

With Kenny Barron

- The Only One (Reservoir, 1990)
- Lemuria-Seascape (Candid, 1991)
- Live at Bradley's (EmArcy, 2001)
- Live at Bradley's II (Sunnyside, 2002)

With Teddy Edwards

- Close Encounters (HighNote, 1999) – also with Houston Person
- Smooth Sailing (HighNote, 2003)

With Art Farmer

- Mirage (Soul Note, 1982)
- Warm Valley (Concord, 1983)

With the Art Farmer/Benny Golson Jazztet

- Moment to Moment (Soul Note, 1983)
- Back to the City (Contemporary, 1986)
- Real Time (Contemporary, 1988) With Carl Fontana, The Great Fontana (Uptown, 1987)

With Ricky Ford

- Future's Gold (Muse, 1983)
- Saxotic Stomp (Muse, 1987)

With Benny Golson

- I Remember Miles (Alfa Jazz, 1993)
- That's Funky (Meldac Jazz, 1995)

With Johnny Griffin

- Return of the Griffin (Galaxy, 1978)
- NYC Underground (Galaxy, 1981)
- To the Ladies (Galaxy, 1982)

With John Hicks

- Is That So? (Timeless, 1991)
- Beyond Expectations (Reservoir, 1993)
- Lover Man: A Tribute to Billie Holiday (Red Baron, 1993)

With Buck Hill

- Capital Hill (Muse, 1990)
- The Buck Stops Here (Muse, 1992)

With Freddie Hubbard

- The Eternal Triangle (Blue Note, 1987) – also with Woody Shaw
- Feel the Wind (Timeless, 1988) – also with Art Blakey

With Bobby Hutcherson

- Bobby Hutcherson Live at Montreux (Blue Note, 1973)
- Cirrus (Blue Note, 1974)
- Good Bait (Landmark, 1985)

With Etta Jones

- At Last (Muse, 1995)
- Easy Living (HighNote, 2000)

With David Murray

- I Want to Talk About You (Black Saint, 1986)
- Ming's Samba (Portrait, 1988)
- Fast Life (DIW/Columbia, 1991)
- Ballads for Bass Clarinet (DIW, 1991)
- Saxmen (Red Baron, 1993)
- Jazzosaurus Rex (Red Baron, 1993)
- Creole (Justin Time, 1997)
- Like a Kiss that Never Ends (Justin Time, 2000)
- Sacred Ground (Justin Time, 2006)

With Houston Person

- Person-ified (HighNote, 1997)
- My Romance (HighNote, 1998)
- Soft Lights (HighNote, 1999)
- Blue Velvet (HighNote, 2001)
- Thinking of You (HighNote, 2007)
- Mellow (HighNote, 2009)
- Moment to Moment (HighNote, 2010)
- So Nice (HighNote, 2011)
- Naturally (HighNote, 2012)
- Nice 'n' Easy (HighNote, 2013)
- The Melody Lingers On (HighNote, 2014)
- Something Personal (HighNote, 2015)

With Pharoah Sanders

- Journey to the One (Theresa, 1980)
- Shukuru (Theresa, 1981 [1985])

With James Spaulding

- Songs of Courage (Muse, 1991 [1993])
- Blues Nexus (Muse, 1993)
- Escapade (HighNote, 1999)

With Michael White

- Spirit Dance (Impulse!, 1971)
- Pneuma (Impulse!, 1972)

With others

- Toshiko Akiyoshi, Remembering Bud: Cleopatra's Dream (Nippon Crown, 1990)
- Chris Anderson, Blues One (DIW, 1991)
- Thomas Chapin, I've Got Your Number (Arabesque, 1993)
- Arnett Cobb, Funky Butt (Progressive, 1980)
- George Coleman, At Yoshi's (Theresa, 1989)
- Ted Curson, The Trio (Interplay, 1979)
- Billy Drummond, Native Colours, (Criss Cross. 1992)
- Curtis Fuller, Blues-ette Part II (Savoy, 1993)
- Slide Hampton, World of Trombones (West 54, 1979)
- Craig Handy, Split Second Timing (Arabesque, 1992)
- Tom Harrell, Stories (Contemporary, 1988)
- the Jazztet, Moment to Moment (Soul Note, 1983)
- Randy Johnston, Walk On (Muse, 1992)
- Lee Konitz, Live at Laren (Soul Note, 1979 [1984])
- Peter Leitch, Landscape (Jazz House, 2014)
- Abbey Lincoln, It's Me (Verve, 2003)
- Wynton Marsalis, Think of One (Columbia, 1983)
- Ronnie Mathews, Roots, Branches & Dances (Bee Hive, 1978)
- Charles McPherson, Manhattan Nocturne (Arabesque, 1998)
- Grachan Moncur III, Exploration (Capri, 2004)
- Frank Morgan, Bop! (Telarc, 1997)
- Idris Muhammad, Kabsha (Theresa, 1980)
- Ben Riley, Grown Folks Music (Sunnyside, 2012)
- Woody Shaw, Imagination (Muse, 1987)
- Horace Silver, Music to Ease Your Disease (Silvertone, 1988)
- Horace Tapscott, Thoughts of Dar es Salaam (Arabesque, 1997)
- Bob Thiele Collective, Lion Hearted (1993)
- Jack Walrath, Journey, Man! (Evidence 1995)
- Michael Weiss, Presenting Michael Weiss (Criss Cross, 1987)
- John Zorn, Voodoo (Black Saint, 1985)
