= Live at Maybeck Recital Hall, Volume Seven =

Live album by John Hicks
- Released: 1991
- Recorded: August 1990
- Venue: Maybeck Recital Hall, Berkeley, California, U.S.
- Genre: Jazz
- Length: 53:49
- Label: Concord; CCD-4442

John Hicks chronology
Is That So? (1990)	Live at Maybeck Recital Hall, Volume Seven (1990)	Blue Bossa (1990)

Live at Maybeck Recital Hall, Volume Seven is an album of solo jazz piano performed by John Hicks recorded in 1990. The album was the seventh of 42 piano recitals at the hall released on CD by the Concord label.

== Music and recording ==
The album was recorded in August 1990 at the Maybeck Recital Hall in Berkeley, California. Hicks reported that, for the performance: "I wanted to do some more standard compositions. Playing solo gives me a chance to extend my repertoire and play some songs I don't normally play in a group setting", and "I arrived with a list of songs I wanted to do. But once I started, I picked songs based on the feeling I got from the audience."

== Release and reception ==
Professional ratings
Review scores
Source	Rating
AllMusic	4/5 stars

It was released by the Concord label. The AllMusic reviewer concluded: "Though not a consistently inspired concert, there are several stretches of truly breathtaking piano playing here, beautifully recorded as usual." The Chicago Tribune commented: "There is a density to John Hicks' solo piano that is rarely apparent in his performances behind others. At times it seems as muscular and lush as McCoy Tyner."

== Track listing ==
1. "Blue in Green" (Miles Davis) – 5:45
2. "All of You" (Cole Porter) – 4:58
3. "After the Rain" (John Coltrane) – 5:36
4. "Speak Low" (Kurt Weill, Ogden Nash) – 4:58
5. "Blues for Maybeck Recital Hall" (John Hicks) – 4:34
6. "Heroes" (Billy Childs) – 5:37
7. "Rhythm-a-Ning" (Thelonious Monk) – 3:37
8. "Duke Ellington's Sound of Love" (Charles Mingus) – 7:58
9. "Oblivion" (Bud Powell) – 3:35
10. "Contemplation" (Wayne Shorter) – 5:30
11. "Straighten Up and Fly Right" (Nat King Cole, Irving Mills) – 3:41

== Personnel ==
- John Hicks – piano
