= Soul Connection =

Studio album by John Patton
- Released: 1983
- Recorded: June 7, 1983
- Genre: Jazz
- Length: 40:22
- Label: Nilva
- Producer: Alvin Queen

John Patton chronology
Memphis to New York Spirit (1969-70)	Soul Connection (1983)	Blue Planet Man (1993)

Soul Connection is an album by American organist John Patton recorded in 1983 and released on the Nilva label.

== Reception ==
Professional ratings
Review scores
Source	Rating
Allmusic	3.5/5 stars

The Allmusic review by Thom Jurek awarded the album 3½ stars and stated "It is the lost gem in his catalog and showcases him in one of the most provocative quintets in his career; it feels quite directly like an extension of Patton's late Blue Note period on titles like Memphis to New York Spirit and Accent on the Blues... This is a necessary Patton date for fans". The All About Jazz review by Jerry D'Souza stated "Patton had a strong band with him on this record... Time has not effaced nor worn the impact of this music. It is still relevant".

== Track listing ==
All compositions by John Patton except as indicated

1. "Soul Connection" (Duško Gojković) - 9:49
2. "Pinto" - 5:19
3. "Extensions" - 6:51
4. "Space Station" (Grachan Moncur III) - 5:39
5. "The Coaster" (Moncur) - 12:44

- Recorded on June 7, 1983.

== Personnel ==
- John Patton - organ
- Grachan Moncur III - trombone
- Grant Reed - tenor saxophone
- Melvin Sparks - guitar
- Alvin Queen - drums
