= Naima's Love Song =

Studio album by John Hicks Quartet
- Released: 1988
- Recorded: April 8 & 9, 1988; Big Box 901 Studio, Tokyo, Japan
- Genre: Jazz
- Length: 46:36
- Label: DIW; DIW 8023
- Producer: John Hicks

John Hicks chronology
East Side Blues (1988)	Naima's Love Song (1988)	Oleo (1989)

Naima's Love Song is an album by pianist John Hicks's Quartet featuring Bobby Watson recorded in 1988 and released on the Japanese DIW label.

== Reception ==
The Allmusic review stated "With pristine sound and plenty of Hicks' inspired and vigorous solo work topping things off, Naima's Love Song qualifies as one of the best jazz titles of the '80s".

Professional ratings
Review scores
Source	Rating
Allmusic	4/5 stars

== Track listing ==
1. "Elementary My Dear Watson" (Curtis Lundy) - 9:14
2. "Someday Soon" (Bobby Watson) - 9:12
3. "Soul Eyes" (Mal Waldron) - 7:43
4. "On the One" (Watson) - 7:00
5. "Pent-Up House" (Sonny Rollins) - 3:26
6. "Naima's Love Song" (John Hicks) - 10:23

== Personnel ==
- John Hicks - piano
- Bobby Watson - alto saxophone
- Curtis Lundy - bass
- Victor Lewis - drums
