= Lover Man: A Tribute to Billie Holiday =

Studio album by John Hicks
- Released: 1993
- Recorded: 1993
- Genre: Jazz
- Label: Red Baron

John Hicks chronology
Beyond Expectations (1993)	Lover Man: A Tribute to Billie Holiday (1993)	Gentle Rain (1994)

Lover Man: A Tribute to Billie Holiday is a trio album led by pianist John Hicks, recorded in 1993.

== Recording and music ==
The album was recorded in 1993. The musicians were pianist John Hicks, bassist Ray Drummond, and drummer Victor Lewis. Hicks's playing imitates the vocal style of Billie Holiday: "on 'God Bless the Child', for example, Hicks uses broken chords to imitate the way Holiday would slide into a phrase, build it up and then let it trail off. He preserves the melody of the song but surrounds it with tenderly crushed chords that capture the harmonic and emotional overtones of her singing."

== Release and reception ==
Professional ratings
Review scores
Source	Rating
AllMusic	2.5/5 stars

Lover Man: A Tribute to Billie Holiday was released by Red Baron Records in 1993. The AllMusic reviewer described the music as "tasteful, relaxed, melodic and somewhat predictable".

== Track listing ==
1. "Lover Man"
2. "What a Little Moonlight Can Do"
3. "Fine and Mellow"
4. "God Bless the Child"
5. "Easy Living"
6. "Billie's Blues"
7. "Some Other Spring"
8. "I Thought About You"

== Personnel ==
- John Hicks – piano
- Ray Drummond – bass
- Victor Lewis – drums
