= Trio + Strings =

Studio album by John Hicks
- Recorded: September 23, 24, 27, 1997
- Studio: Mapleshade Studio, Upper Marlboro, Maryland
- Genre: Jazz
- Label: Mapleshade

John Hicks chronology
Cry Me a River (1997)	Trio + Strings (1997)	Impressions of Mary Lou (1998)

Trio + Strings is an album by pianist John Hicks, recorded in 1997.

== Recording and music ==
The album was recorded at Mapleshade Studio, Upper Marlboro, Maryland, on September 23, 24, and 27, 1997. The compositions were by Hicks, with the exception of "Passion Flower". The string arrangements were by Larry Willis.

== Release ==
Trio + Strings was released by Mapleshade Records.

== Reception ==
Professional ratings
Review scores
Source	Rating
The Penguin Guide to Jazz	3/4 stars

The Penguin Guide to Jazz commented that it was "Not our favourite Hicks record by any means but an accomplished and pleasing record." JazzTimes stated that Hicks' writing "evokes Strayhorn [...] Evans, Ibrahim, and perhaps even Elmo Hope".

== Track listing ==
All compositions are by John Hicks, except where noted.

1. "Heart to Heart"
2. "Minor Collaboration"
3. "Peace for E.H."
4. "Two Heart Beats"
5. "The Wandering Soul"
6. "Naima's Love Song"
7. "Passion Flower" (Billy Strayhorn)
8. "After the Dawn"
9. "West Side Winds"
10. "No More Regrets"

== Personnel ==
- John Hicks – piano
- Elise Wood – flute
- Steve Novosel – bass
- Ronnie Burrage – drums (tracks 1, 3, 5–10)
- Steve Williams – drums (tracks 2, 4)
- Rick Schmidt – cello
- Debbie Baker – viola
- Charles Olive – violin
- Tom Ginsberg – violin
