= In the Mix (album) =

Studio album by John Hicks
- Released: 1995
- Recorded: November 13, 1994
- Studio: Systems Two, Brooklyn, New York
- Genre: Jazz
- Label: Landmark

John Hicks chronology
Akari (1994)	In the Mix (1994)	Piece for My Peace (1995)

In the Mix is an album by pianist John Hicks, recorded in 1994.

== Recording and music ==
The album was recorded at Systems Two in Brooklyn, New York, on November 13, 1994. The five musicians were Vincent Herring (alto and soprano sax), Elise Wood (flute), John Hicks (piano), Curtis Lundy (bass), and Cecil Brooks III (drums). Half of the eight tracks were written by Hicks.

== Release ==
In the Mix was released by Landmark Records.

== Track listing ==
1. "In the Mix" (John Hicks)
2. "Yemenja" (Hicks)
3. "Elation" (Vincent Herring)
4. "Soul Eyes" (Mal Waldron)
5. "Motivation" (Hicks)
6. "Weaver of Dreams" (Jack Elliott, Victor Young)
7. "Mind Wine" (Hicks)
8. "Once in a While" (Michael Edwards, Bud Green)

== Personnel ==
- Vincent Herring – alto sax, soprano sax
- Elise Wood – flute
- John Hicks – piano
- Curtis Lundy – bass
- Cecil Brooks III – drums
