= Is That So? =

Studio album by John Hicks 3
- Released: 1991
- Recorded: July 10, 1990; Studio 44, Monster, Holland
- Genre: Jazz
- Length: 69:27
- Labels: Timeless; SJP 357
- Producer: John Hicks

John Hicks chronology
Power Trio (1990)	Is That So? (1991)	Live at Maybeck Recital Hall, Volume Seven (1990)

Is That So? is an album by pianist John Hicks's Trio recorded in Holland in 1990 and released on the Dutch Timeless label.

== Reception ==
The Allmusic review stated "Is That So? (which Hicks produced himself) may not be the most challenging or chance-taking album of the improviser's career, but his lyrical, melodic pianism is still attractive. And his accompaniment isn't anything to complain about... Is That So? falls short of essential, but all things considered, it is an album that Hicks' hardcore fans will find to be pleasing and solid".

Professional ratings
Review scores
Source	Rating
Allmusic	3/5 stars

== Track listing ==
All compositions by John Hicks except as indicated

1. "Is That So?" (Duke Pearson) - 7:30
2. "Autumn Leaves" (Joseph Kosma, Jacques Prévert, Johnny Mercer) - 6:22
3. "How Insensitive" (Antônio Carlos Jobim, Vinícius de Moraes) - 8:52
4. "April Eyes" - 5:10
5. "Yesterdays" (Jerome Kern, Otto Harbach) - 4:50
6. "Emily" (Johnny Mandel, Johnny Mercer) - 7:48
7. "I'll Remember April" (Gene de Paul, Patricia Johnston, Don Raye) - 9:09
8. "Never Let Me Go" (Jay Livingston, Ray Evans) - 8:11
9. "Softly, as in a Morning Sunrise" (Sigmund Romberg, Oscar Hammerstein II) - 5:21
10. "Sonnymoon for Two" (Sonny Rollins) - 6:14

== Personnel ==
- John Hicks - piano
- Ray Drummond - bass
- Idris Muhammad - drums
