= Dwayne Dolphin =

- Born: May 7, 1963 (age 62); Pittsburgh, Pennsylvania, U.S.
- Genres: Jazz, funk
- Occupation: Musician
- Instrument: Bass

Dwayne Dolphin is a jazz and funk bassist, composer, and educator who grew up and lives in Pittsburgh.

He's been an adjunct faculty member in Duquesne University's Jazz Performance Department and currently leads his own band, the Dwayne Dolphin Fo'Tet in addition to being a mainstay in Roger Humphries RH Factor.

== Biography ==
Dolphin plays acoustic bass, electric bass and piccolo bass. He first picked up the electric bass at age 10, switching from guitar because the sound of it was too high and it hurt his ears. By the age of 15, he was playing locally in Pittsburgh.

One Friday during high school, one of his teachers gave him Miles Davis's album Kind of Blue, telling him to go home and learn it. He came back to school on Monday and played one of Davis' solos. The teacher asked, "What is that? I wanted you to learn the bass parts." "No, you told me to learn the record."

His first thought that he might make a life in music came in 10th grade when he visited Guadeloupe with saxophonist Nathan Davis, where he was inspired by the cultural differences.

When pianist Geri Allen moved back to Pittsburgh to teach, she told him that if he wanted to play with her, he had to play "the big bass", which he had reservations about since he could not play it for a whole gig because his hands would bleed. He had to switch between it and his electric bass so his hands could make it through the gig.

Right after high school, he was playing in Boston when Wynton Marsalis picked him to join his quintet. Within weeks of joining the band, they traveled to Los Angeles and recorded on The Tonight Show one night when Bill Cosby was the host. His was the only harmonic instrument there, which drew attention to his playing and started things rolling for him.

== Influences ==
He knew he wanted to play the acoustic upright bass after hearing Sam Jones play on The Cannonball Adderley Quintet at the Lighthouse. At the time, he played only part way up the neck of his electric bass: "Here was this guy playing all over the instrument and I knew, at that minute, I want to do that.

Dolphin says that Stanley Turrentine really touched him as being everything he wanted to be in a jazz musician: "He was a sound innovator and everything that came out of his horn was from his heart. He was so in touch with music, with his soul, with the universe and that's what came out of his horn."

"The band I learned the most from was Hank Crawford. He was the dude for me because it was a great group and things were down to earth. I was the young guy in with these masters which put me in work mode so all I did for three years was practice. I learned how to make that bass talk." "Working with Maceo Parker, Fred Wesley for 20 years and Pee Wee Ellis ... if you want to get into funk, you're at the apex now. That was big fun."

== Playing style ==
The AllMusic reviewer of his 1993 album Portrait of Adrian noted that "(His) tone is round and full, and he's got an agile technique. Certainly the late Paul Chambers must have been an influence. Like Chambers, Dolphin tends to place his unfussy improvisations in the instrument's lower register. Consequently, his lines are solidly melodic and generally to the point."

He says that "My job is to make people feel good. Play and try to make the instrument communicate to the point where it connects to human beings from soul to soul as opposed to ear to ear."

== Discography ==
=== As leader/co-leader ===
- Portrait of Adrian (Minor Music, 1993)
- Three Of A Kind, Madsen - Dolphin - Cox, (Minor Music, 1994)
- Meets Mister T., Three Of A Kind, (Minor Music 1994)
- Drip Some Grease, Three Of A Kind, (Minor Music 1996)
- 4 Robin (AAM, 2004)
- Ming (Bonedog, 2006)
- Pretty Girl (Bonedog, 2008)
- Essence of an Angel (Corona, 2012)
- Indigenous (2018)
- Let The Music Play (Imani Records, 2025)

=== As sideman ===
With Geri Allen

- Maroons (Blue Note, 1992)

With Bill Heid

- Air Mobile (Doodlin’ Records, 2006)

With Arthur Blythe

- Blythe Byte (Savant, 2001)

With Pee Wee Ellis

- Twelve and More Blues (Minor Music, 1993)

With John Hicks

- Something to Live For: A Billy Strayhorn Songbook (HighNote, 1997)
- Nightwind: An Erroll Garner Songbook (HighNote, 1997)
- Impressions of Mary Lou (HighNote, 1998)
- Music in the Key of Clark (HighNote, 2001)
- Fatha's Day: An Earl Hines Songbook (HighNote, 2003)

With Jimmy Ponder

- James Street (HighNote, 1997)

With Stanley Turrentine

- T Time (MusicMasters, 1995)

With Fred Wesley

- Swing & Be Funky (Minor Music, 1993)
- Amalgamation (Minor Music, 1994)

With Nancy Wilson

- R.S.V.P. (Rare Songs, Very Personal) (MCG Jazz, 2004)
