= Ballads for Bass Clarinet =

Studio album by David Murray
- Released: 1993
- Recorded: October 1991
- Genre: Jazz
- Length: 52:16
- Label: DIW
- Producer: Kanzunori Sugiyama

David Murray chronology
| Death of a Sideman (1992) | Ballads for Bass Clarinet (1993) | South of the Border (1995) |

Ballads for Bass Clarinet is an album by David Murray, recorded in 1991 and released by DIW Records.

== Music and recording ==
The album was recorded in October 1991 by the quartet of Murray (bass clarinet), pianist John Hicks, bassist Ray Drummond, and drummer Idris Muhammad.

== Reception ==
Professional ratings
Review scores
| Source | Rating |
|---|---|
| AllMusic | 3/5 stars |
| The Penguin Guide to Jazz | 4/4 stars |

Ballads for Bass Clarinet was released by DIW Records. The AllMusic review awarded the album 3 stars. The Penguin Guide to Jazz commented on the similarity between Murray's phrasing on bass clarinet and on tenor saxophone.

== Track listing ==
1. "Waltz to Heaven" – 9:36
2. "New Life" – 9:05
3. "Chazz" (Wilber Morris) – 8:43
4. "Portrait of a Black Woman – for Mae Francis Owens" – 11:39
5. "Lyons Street" (Idris Muhammad) – 3:21
6. "Elegy for Fannie Lou" (Kunle Mwanga) – 9:46

All compositions by David Murray except as indicated.

== Personnel ==
- David Murray – bass clarinet
- John Hicks – piano
- Ray Drummond – bass
- Idris Muhammad – drums
