= St. Thomas: Tribute to Great Tenors =

Studio album by New York Unit
- Recorded: June 25, 1991
- Studio: Music Inn Studio, Tokyo
- Genre: Jazz
- Label: Paddle Wheel

John Hicks chronology
Blue Bossa (1990)	St. Thomas: Tribute to Great Tenors (1991)	Tribute to George Adams (1991–92)

St. Thomas: Tribute to Great Tenors is an album by New York Unit, consisting of pianist John Hicks, bassist Richard Davis, and drummer Tatsuya Nakamura. It was recorded in 1991.

== Recording and music ==
"During the first half of the 1990s, the New York Unit (pianist John Hicks, bassist Richard Davis, and drummer Tatsuya Nakamura) were actively recording, but usually with a different guest artist." This album was recorded at Music Inn Studio, Tokyo, on June 25, 1991 (a discography suggests January 25, 1991). The trio played "songs either composed by or closely associated with each of the four honored musicians": John Coltrane, Stan Getz, Sonny Rollins, and Archie Shepp (the CD notes add Wayne Shorter to the list).

== Release ==
St. Thomas: Tribute to Great Tenors was released by Paddle Wheel Records.

== Track listing ==
1. "St. Thomas"
2. "Softly, As in a Morning Sunrise"
3. "The Shadow of Your Smile"
4. "Fee-Fi-Fo-Fum"
5. "Dear Old Stockholm"
6. "A Child Is Born"
7. "Impressions"
8. "My One and Only Love"

== Personnel ==
- John Hicks – piano
- Richard Davis – bass
- Tatsuya Nakamura – drums
