= Piece for My Peace =

Studio album by John Hicks
- Released: 1996
- Recorded: August 8, 1995
- Studio: EastSide Sound, New York City
- Genre: Jazz
- Label: Landmark

John Hicks chronology
In the Mix (1994)	Piece for My Peace (1995)	Heart Beats (1995)

Piece for My Peace is an album by pianist John Hicks, recorded in 1995.

== Recording and music ==
The album was recorded at EastSide Sound, New York City, on August 8, 1995. Five of the tracks are played by the sextet of saxophonists Vincent Herring and Bobby Watson, flautist Elise Wood, pianist John Hicks, bassist Curtis Lundy, and drummer Cecil Brooks III. "Star-Crossed Lovers" is a duet by Hicks and Wood.

== Release and reception ==
Professional ratings
Review scores
Source	Rating
AllMusic	4/5 stars

Piece for My Peace was released by Landmark Records. The AllMusic reviewer commented that "Hicks, who often shows off the influence of McCoy Tyner's voicings, has never recorded an uninspired record and this one is better than average for him. Due to the variety of moods, instrumental colors and settings, the music is continually interesting and well worth acquiring."

== Track listing ==
1. "Faith"
2. "Piece for My Peace"
3. "Mood Swings"
4. "Diane"
5. "Mudd's Mode"
6. "Don't Let It Go"
7. "So in Love"
8. "I Should Care"
9. "My Shining Hours"
10. "Star-Crossed Lovers"

== Personnel ==
- Vincent Herring – tenor sax (tracks 1, 2, 5, 6, 8); alto sax (track 9)
- Bobby Watson – alto sax (tracks 1, 2, 5, 6, 8, 9)
- Elise Wood – flute (tracks 1, 2, 5, 6, 8, 10)
- John Hicks – piano
- Curtis Lundy – bass
- Cecil Brooks III – drums
