= Love Remains (Bobby Watson album) =

Studio album by Robert Watson Quartet
- Released: 1987
- Recorded: November 13, 1986
- Studio: Manhattan Recording Company, NYC
- Genre: Jazz
- Length: 45:18
- Label: Red; 123212
- Producer: Bobby Watson

Robert Watson chronology
| Appointment in Milano (1985) | Love Remains (1987) | The Year of the Rabbit (1986) |

Love Remains is an album by saxophonist Robert Watson which was recorded in 1986 and released on the Italian Red label.

== Reception ==
Professional ratings
Review scores
| Source | Rating |
|---|---|
| AllMusic | 4/5 stars |
| Penguin Guide to Jazz | 👑 |

On AllMusic, Scott Yanow observed "the high-quality music is essentially advanced hard bop and gives Watson a good opportunity to stretch out on some challenging structures".

The Penguin Guide to Jazz Recordings listed the album as part of its suggested "core collection" of essential recordings.

== Track listing ==
All compositions by Bobby Watson except where noted.

1. "The Mystery of Ebop" – 9:06
2. "Love Remains" (Bobby Watson, Pamela Watson) – 9:22
3. "Blues for Alto" – 6:06
4. "Ode for Aaron" – 3:36
5. "Dark Days (For Nelson Mandela)" – 6:22
6. "Sho Thang" (Curtis Lundy) – 4:48
7. "The Love We Had Yesterday" – 5:58

== Personnel ==
- Robert Watson – alto saxophone
- John Hicks – piano
- Curtis Lundy – bass
- Marvin "Smitty" Smith – drums
