= Cecil Brooks III =

American jazz drummer & record producer (born 1959)

Cecil Brooks III (born 1959) is an American jazz drummer and record producer who has worked with Arthur Blythe, Russell Gunn, John Hicks, Andrew Hill, Etta Jones, Houston Person, Roseanna Vitro, Hannibal Lokumbe, and Jimmy Ponder.

A native of the Homewood neighborhood of Pittsburgh, Pennsylvania, Brooks released a number of albums for Muse and Savant. The jazz club that he started in West Orange NJ – Cecil's – closed in 2012 after 10 years.

== Discography ==
=== As leader ===
- The Collective (Muse, 1989)
- Hangin' with Smooth (Muse, 1992)
- Neck Peckin' Jammie (Muse, 1994)
- Smokin' Jazz (Muse, 1996)
- For Those Who Love to Groove (Savant, 1999)
- Live at Sweet Basil (Savant, 2001)
- Live at Sweet Basil Vol. 2 (Savant, 2002)
- Double Exposure (Savant, 2006)
- Hot Dog (Savant, 2009)

=== As sideman ===
With Arthur Blythe

- Spirits in the Field (Savant, 2000)
- Blythe Byte (Savant, 2001)
- Focus (Savant, 2002)
- Exhale (Savant, 2003)

With Don Braden

- Landing Zone (Landmark, 1995)
- Organic (Epicure, 1995)
- The Voice of the Saxophone (RCA Victor/BMG, 1997)
- Brighter Days (HighNote, 2001)
- The New Hang (HighNote, 2004)
- Gentle Storm (HighNote, 2008)
- Luminosity (Creative Perspective Music, 2015)

With John Hicks

- In the Mix (Landmark, 1995)
- Piece for My Peace (Landmark, 1996)
- Something to Live For: A Billy Strayhorn Songbook (HighNote, 1998)
- Nightwind: An Erroll Garner Songbook (HighNote, 1999)
- Impressions of Mary Lou (HighNote, 2000)
- Music in the Key of Clark (HighNote, 2002)
- Fatha's Day: An Earl Hines Songbook (HighNote, 2003)

With Etta Jones & Houston Person

- Fine and Mellow (Muse, 1987)
- Sugar (Muse, 1990)
- Christmas with Etta Jones (Muse, 1990)

With Jimmy Ponder

- James Street (HighNote, 1997)
- Guitar Christmas (HighNote, 1998)
- Thumbs Up (HighNote, 2001)
- What's New (HighNote, 2005)

With Jack Walrath

- Serious Hang (Muse, 1992)
- Hipgnosis (TCB, 1995)
- Godzilla Jazz (Paddle Wheel, 1998)
- Invasion of the Booty Shakers (Savant, 2002)

With others

- T. K. Blue, Another Blue (Arkadia Jazz, 1999)
- Leon Lee Dorsey, The Watcher (Landmark, 1995)
- Russell Gunn, Young Gunn (Muse, 1995)
- Russell Gunn, Mood Swings (HighNote, 2003)
- Winard Harper, Trap Dancer (Savant, 1998)
- Allan Harris, Love Came (Love, 2001)
- Andrew Hill, But Not Farewell (Blue Note, 1991)
- Richard Groove Holmes, Blues All Day Long (Muse, 1989)
- Richard Groove Holmes, Timeless (Savoy, 2003)
- Ron Jackson, Thinking of You (Muse, 1994)
- Eric Johnson, Makin Whoopie (Bluejay, 1997)
- Talib Kibwe, Introducing Talibe Kibwe (Evidence, 1996)
- Oliver Lake, Dedicated to Dolphy (Black Saint, 1996)
- Oliver Lake, Talkin' Stick (Passin' Thru, 2000)
- Michael Logan, Night Out (Muse, 1994)
- Johnny Lytle, Moonchild (Muse, 1992)
- Brother Jack McDuff, Another Real Good'un (Muse, 1992)
- Houston Person, Basics (Muse, 1989)
- Houston Person & Etta Jones, Christmas with Houston Person and Etta Jones (32 Jazz, 1997)
- Hannibal Lokumbe, One with the Wind (Muse, 1994)
- Hannibal Lokumbe, African Portraits (Teldec, 1995)
- Red Prysock, For Me and My Baby (Gateway, 1964)
- Eric Reed, from My Heart (Savant, 2002)
- Michele Rosewoman, Contrast High (Enja, 1989)
