= East Side Blues =

Studio album by John Hicks Trio
- Released: 1988
- Recorded: April 8, 1988
- Studio: Big Box 901 Studio, Tokyo, Japan
- Genre: Jazz
- Length: 53:43
- Label: DIW; DIW 8028
- Producer: Shigenobu Mori, John Hicks & Bobby Watson

John Hicks chronology
Luminous (1985–88)	East Side Blues (1988)	Naima's Love Song (1988)

East Side Blues is an album by pianist John Hicks's Trio recorded in Japan in 1988 and released on the Japanese DIW label.

== Reception ==
The Allmusic review stated "This album is explosive and substantive".

Professional ratings
Review scores
Source	Rating
Allmusic	4/5 stars

== Track listing ==
All compositions by John Hicks except where noted.

1. "East Side Blues" - 7:10
2. "Yemenja" - 6:03
3. "Never Let Me Go" (Jay Livingston, Ray Evans) - 7:18
4. "Out of Somewhere" - 6:44
5. "Mou's Move" - 7:15
6. "Is That So?" - 8:01
7. "Somedity - 4:32
8. "A Beautiful Friendship" - 6:40

== Personnel ==
- John Hicks - piano
- Curtis Lundy - bass
- Victor Lewis - drums
