= I'll Give You Something to Remember Me By =

Album by John Hicks

Studio album by John Hicks
- Recorded: March 12, 1987; Monster, the Netherlands
- Genre: Jazz
- Label: Limetree

John Hicks chronology
Two of a Kind (1986–87)	I'll Give You Something to Remember Me By (1987)	Luminous (1985–88)

I'll Give You Something to Remember Me By is an album led by pianist John Hicks, recorded in 1987.

== Recording and music ==
The album was recorded in Monster, The Netherlands, on March 12, 1987. The musicians were pianist John Hicks, bassist Curtis Lundy, and drummer Idris Muhammad.

== Release ==
I'll Give You Something to Remember Me By was released by Limetree Records. A re-release by the same company added one track – "Ted's Delight" – from the same session.

== Reception ==
Critic Stuart Nicholson commented that the recording "returns to Hicks' refreshingly contemporary swing".

== Track listing ==
1. "Hold It Down"
2. "Pas De Trois"
3. "Monk's Mood"
4. "I Didn't Know What Time It Was"
5. "Airegin"
6. "My Foolish Heart"
7. "Blue In Green"
8. "Coral Keys"

== Personnel ==
- John Hicks – piano
- Curtis Lundy – bass
- Idris Muhammad – drums
