= Music in the Key of Clark =

Studio album by John Hicks
- Released: January 22, 2002
- Recorded: March 18, 2001
- Studio: Tedesco Studios, Paramus, NJ
- Genre: Jazz
- Length: 63:16
- Label: HighNote; HCD 7083
- Producer: Cecil Brooks III

John Hicks chronology
Beautiful Friendship (2000)	Music in the Key of Clark (2002)	Fatha's Day: An Earl Hines Songbook (2003)

Music in the Key of Clark (subtitled Remembering Sonny Clark) is an album by pianist John Hicks which was recorded in 2001 and released on the HighNote label. The album features eight compositions by Sonny Clark and five by Hicks.

== Reception ==
Allmusic reviewed the album stating "Overall, the desired effect of such a brilliant release is to make one want to obtain earlier CDs by John Hicks and also to look for the original versions by Sonny Clark, if they aren't already in the listener's possession". JazzTimes said "Music in the Key of Clark is not about imitation, however, but about tribute. Hicks calls attention to his predecessor's legacy with superb trio versions of pieces from Clark's huge output as a composer".

Professional ratings
Review scores
Source	Rating
Allmusic	4/5 stars
The Penguin Guide to Jazz Recordings	3.5/4 stars

== Track listing ==
All compositions by Sonny Clark except as indicated

1. "Pocket Full of Blues" (John Hicks) - 7:07
2. "My Conception (Prelude)" - 1:23
3. "My Conception" - 6:42
4. "Cable Car" - 4:39
5. "Sonny's Ballad" - 4:10
6. "Minor Meeting" - 4:39
7. "I Deal" - 4:11
8. "Sonny's Mood" - 3:51
9. "Sonny's Crib" - 5:17
10. "Angel With a Briefcase" (Hicks) - 3:47
11. "Clark Bar Blues" (Hicks) - 7:34
12. "Sonny Side Up" (Hicks) - 5:29
13. "A Sonny Day" (Hicks) - 4:27

== Personnel ==
- John Hicks - piano
- Dwayne Dolphin - bass
- Cecil Brooks III - drums

=== Production ===
- Cecil Brooks III - producer
- David Baker - engineer
