= Fatha's Day: An Earl Hines Songbook =

Studio album by John Hicks
- Released: September 9, 2003
- Recorded: May 20, 2003; Tedesco Studios, Paramus, NJ
- Genre: Jazz
- Length: 69:59
- Label: HighNote; HCD 7110
- Producer: Cecil Brooks III

John Hicks chronology
Music in the Key of Clark (2001)	Fatha's Day: An Earl Hines Songbook (2003)	Besame Mucho (2003)

Fatha's Day: An Earl Hines Songbook is an album by pianist John Hicks which was recorded in 2003 and released on the HighNote label. The album features seven compositions written or recorded by Earl Hines and five by Hicks.

== Reception ==
Allmusic reviewed the album stating "More than a few jazz musicians could learn how to make tribute CDs by listening gems such as this one by John Hicks". JazzTimes said "Fatha's Day is completely worth celebrating". All About Jazz observed "Hicks honors Hines without attempting to emulate the elder musician's famous "trumpet style" technique, instead finding inspiration in original compositions and other songs often performed by the Pittsburgh pianist".

Professional ratings
Review scores
Source	Rating
Allmusic	4/5 stars
The Penguin Guide to Jazz Recordings	3/4 stars

== Track listing ==
All compositions by Earl Hines except as indicated

1. "Rosetta" - 4:09
2. "Almost Spring" (Mickey Bass) - 7:06
3. "Remembering Earl and Marva" (John Hicks) - 3:30
4. "Serenata" (Leroy Anderson) - 6:14
5. "Poor Butterfly" (John Golden, Raymond Hubbell) - 4:31
6. "My Monday Date" - 7:54
7. "Fatha's Bedtime Story" (Hicks) - 3:17
8. "Sweet and Lovely" (Gus Arnheim, Charles Daniels, Harry Tobias) - 6:17
9. "Rhythm Run (Uphill)" (Hicks) - 4:21
10. "You Can Depend on Me" (Charles Carpenter, Louis Dunlap, Earl Hines) - 5:39
11. "Twelve Bars for Linton" (Hicks) - 4:35
12. "Synopsis" (Hicks) - 6:22

== Personnel ==
- John Hicks - piano
- Dwayne Dolphin - bass
- Cecil Brooks III - drums

=== Production ===
- Cecil Brooks III - producer
- Joe Fields - engineer
