= I Want to Talk About You =

1989 live album by the David Murray Quartet

Live album by David Murray Quartet
- Released: 1989
- Recorded: March 1, 1986
- Genre: Jazz
- Length: 56:13
- Label: Black Saint

David Murray Quartet chronology
New Life (1985)	I Want to Talk About You (1989)	The Hill (1984)

Professional ratings
Review scores
Source	Rating
AllMusic	1.5/5 stars
The Penguin Guide to Jazz Recordings	3.5/4 stars

I Want to Talk About You is an album by David Murray, released in 1989 on the Italian Black Saint label. It features a live performance by Murray, John Hicks, Ray Drummond and Ralph Peterson.

== Track listing ==
1. "Heart to Heart" (Hicks) - 12:48
2. "Quads" (Drummond) - 6:58
3. "Red Car" (Morris) - 8:37
4. "I Want to Talk About You" (Eckstine) - 13:40
5. "Morning Song" (Murray) - 14:10

- Recorded at Charlie's Tap, Boston, March 1, 1986

== Personnel ==
- David Murray: tenor saxophone, bass clarinet
- John Hicks: piano
- Ray Drummond: bass
- Ralph Peterson: drums
