= Impressions of Mary Lou =

Studio album by John Hicks
- Released: August 29, 2000
- Recorded: June 19, 1998; Audiomation Studio, Pittsburgh, PA
- Genre: Jazz
- Length: 52:01
- Label: HighNote; HCD 7046
- Producer: Cecil Brooks III

John Hicks chronology
Trio + Strings (1997)	Impressions of Mary Lou (2000)	Ow! (1998)

Impressions of Mary Lou is an album by pianist John Hicks which was recorded in 1998 and released on the HighNote label. The album features eight compositions by Mary Lou Williams along with five by Hicks.

== Reception ==
AllMusic reviewed the album stating "What is so compelling about Hicks' salute to Williams is that he ignores her best known secular works; he sticks mostly to excerpts from her religious compositions, which, of course, still swing mightily... Recommended". JazzTimes said "Hicks does a good job getting inside the tunes and developing them in his own way... Admirers of Hicks and Williams should enjoy this well-executed homage".

Professional ratings
Review scores
Source	Rating
AllMusic	4/5 stars
The Penguin Guide to Jazz Recordings	3.5/4 stars

== Track listing ==
All compositions by Mary Lou Williams except as indicated

1. "Lord Have Mercy" - 4:31
2. "Ballad for Mary Lou" (John Hicks) - 3:21
3. "O.W." - 4:08
4. "Old Time Spiritual" - 3:45
5. "Mary Lou's Interlude" (Hicks) - 4:09
6. "Medi II" - 7:54
7. "Not Just Your Blues" (Hicks) - 4:31
8. "Intermission" (Williams, Milton Suggs) - 4:58
9. "Not Too Straight" (Hicks) - 4:03
10. "Two for You" (Hicks) - 4:31
11. "Aries" - 2:15
12. "The Lord Says" - 3:55

== Personnel ==
- John Hicks - piano
- Dwayne Dolphin - bass
- Cecil Brooks III - drums

=== Production ===
- Cecil Brooks III - producer
- George Heid - engineer
