= James Street (album) =

Studio album by Jimmy Ponder
- Released: 1997
- Recorded: June 16, 1997
- Studios: Audiomation Studio, Pittsburgh, PA
- Genre: Jazz
- Length: 57:00
- Labels: HighNote; HCD 7017
- Producer: Cecil Brooks III

Jimmy Ponder chronology
Something to Ponder (1994)	James Street (1997)	Ain't Misbehavin' (1998)

James Street is an album by guitarist Jimmy Ponder that was released by HighNote in 1997.

== Reception ==
Professional ratings
Review scores
Source	Rating
AllMusic	4.5/5 stars

In his review on AllMusic, Scott Yanow stated "Guitarist Jimmy Ponder is most closely associated with soul-jazz organ groups, so this quartet outing with pianist John Hicks, bassist Dwayne Dolphin, and drummer Cecil Brooks III is a happy surprise. During the bop-oriented set, Ponder takes a few numbers unaccompanied, works well with Hicks (with whom he had not performed previously), and shows that he can play bop as well as almost anyone". In JazzTimes, Willard Jenkins wrote "One of the legion of unsung and underrated jazz artists who are the backbone of the music, Ponder has been largely showcased in funky-butt organ settings. This time around drummer-producer Cecil Brooks III decided to make it lean and simple as Ponder wends his way through the 11 tracks".

== Track listing ==
All compositions by Jimmy Ponder, Barney Fields and Cecil Brooks III except where noted

1. "J.P." – 3:29
2. "They Can't Take That Away from Me" (George Gershwin, Ira Gershwin) – 4:38
3. "September Song" (Kurt Weill, Maxwell Anderson) – 5:11
4. "God Bless the Child" (Arthur Herzog, Jr., Billie Holiday) – 8:20
5. "James Street" – 5:05
6. "Love Theme from "Spartacus"" (Alex North) – 3:49
7. "My One and Only Love" (George Gershwin, Ira Gershwin) – 3:21
8. "The End of a Beautiful Friendship" (Donald Kahn, Stanley Styne) – 4:03
9. "In a Sentimental Mood" (Duke Ellington) – 10:21
10. "Mister Magic" (Ralph MacDonald, William Salter) – 4:40
11. "N.Y.C." – 4:03

== Personnel ==
- Jimmy Ponder – guitar
- John Hicks – piano (tracks 2–5, 8, 9 & 11)
- Dwayne Dolphin – bass, piccolo bass (tracks 2–5 & 8–11)
- Cecil Brooks III – drums (tracks 2–5, 8, 9 & 11)
