= Akari (album) =

Studio album by New York Unit
- Recorded: August 3, 1994; Tokyo, Japan
- Genre: Jazz
- Label: Apollon

John Hicks chronology
Duality (1994)	Akari (1994)	In the Mix (1994)

Akari is an album by New York Unit, consisting of trumpeter Hannibal Marvin Peterson, pianist John Hicks, bassist Richard Davis, and drummer Tatsuya Nakamura. It was recorded in 1994.

== Recording and music ==
The album was recorded in Tokyo on August 3, 1994. It was a quartet recording, with trumpeter Hannibal Marvin Peterson, pianist John Hicks, bassist Richard Davis, and drummer Tatsuya Nakamura.

== Release ==
Akari was released by Apollon. It was also released by What's New Records with one track – an alternative take of "Gentle Rain" from the same session – added.

== Track listing ==
1. "Manha De Carnaval"
2. "Tenderly"
3. "Willow Weep for Me"
4. "Gentle Rain"
5. "Smile"
6. "Lover Man"
7. "Moonlight in Vermont"
8. "Reminiscing"

== Personnel ==
- Hannibal Marvin Peterson – trumpet
- John Hicks – piano
- Richard Davis – bass
- Tatsuya Nakamura – drums
