= Nightwind: An Erroll Garner Songbook =

Studio album by John Hicks
- Released: September 28, 1999
- Recorded: June 21, 1997
- Studio: Audiomation Studio, Pittsburgh, PA
- Genre: Jazz
- Length: 57:35
- Label: HighNote; HCD 7035
- Producer: Cecil Brooks III

John Hicks chronology
Something to Live For: A Billy Strayhorn Songbook (1997)	Nightwind: An Erroll Garner Songbook (1999)	Cry Me a River (1997)

Nightwind: An Erroll Garner Songbook is an album by the pianist John Hicks, recorded in 1997 and released on the HighNote label. The album contains 10 compositions by Erroll Garner along with a tribute by Hicks.

== Reception ==
AllMusic stated that "Hicks' tribute to the late Erroll Garner emphasizes the song writing brilliance that is overshadowed by the huge success of his classic 'Misty' ... John Hicks has done a service to jazz fans by exploring the music of Erroll Garner in greater detail". JazzTimes wrote: "Hicks is a very different pianist than Garner: his left hand carries subtle dynamic shadings, where Garner's was all about time. He shares with Garner a reverence for melody and a sense of musical destination that gives form to his improvisations".

Professional ratings
Review scores
Source	Rating
AllMusic	4/5 stars
The Penguin Guide to Jazz Recordings	3/4 stars

== Track listing ==
All compositions by Erroll Garner except as indicated

1. "Tribute to EG" (John Hicks) - 2:59
2. "Misty" - 6:23
3. "Paris Cries" - 4:24
4. "Paris Lover" - 5:25
5. "Night Wind" - 3:29
6. "Left Bank Swing" - 3:40
7. "Passing Through" - 4:04
8. "Something Happens" - 7:06
9. "Solitaire" (Steve Allen, Erroll Garner) - 4:58
10. "It Gets Better Every Time" - 4:02
11. "Dreamy" - 6:44

== Personnel ==
- John Hicks - piano
- Dwayne Dolphin - bass
- Cecil Brooks III - drums

=== Production ===
- Cecil Brooks III - producer
- George Heid - engineer
