= Power Trio =

Studio album by John Hicks, Cecil McBee and Elvin Jones
- Released: 1991
- Recorded: May 10, 1990
- Studio: BMG Recording Studios, New York City
- Genre: Jazz
- Length: 66:26
- Label: Novus; 3115-2-N
- Producer: Bob Thiele

Elvin Jones chronology
Elvin Jones Jazz Machine Live at Pit Inn (1985)	Power Trio (1991)	When I Was at Aso-Mountain (1990)

John Hicks chronology
Rhythm-a-Ning (1989)	Power Trio (1990)	Is That So? (1990)

Power Trio is a jazz album by pianist John Hicks, bassist Cecil McBee and drummer Elvin Jones recorded in 1990 and released on the Novus label.

== Reception ==
The AllMusic review stated "This summit recording by pianist John Hicks, drummer Elvin Jones, and bassist Cecil McBee might not always hit the heights, but it still impresses with a fine repertoire and quality playing... In spite of a few musical missteps and the somewhat tinny sound of Hicks' piano, this fine trio recording still comes highly recommended".

Professional ratings
Review scores
Source	Rating
AllMusic	3/5 stars

== Track listing ==
1. "Cousin Mary" (John Coltrane) – 6:34
2. "After the Rain" (Coltrane) – 8:07
3. "'D' Bass-ic Blues" (Cecil McBee) – 6:42
4. "Duke's Place" (Duke Ellington, Bob Thiele, Ruth Roberts, Bill Katz) – 9:38
5. "Chelsea Bridge" (Billy Strayhorn) – 8:37
6. "After the Morning" (John Hicks) – 7:28

== Personnel ==
- John Hicks – piano
- Cecil McBee – bass
- Elvin Jones – drums
