= Jazzosaurus Rex =

Studio album by David Murray
- Released: 1993
- Recorded: August 18, 1993
- Genre: Jazz
- Length: 50:28
- Label: Red Baron
- Producer: Bob Thiele

David Murray chronology
Acoustic Octfunk (1993)	Jazzosaurus Rex (1993)	Saxmen (1993)

Jazzosaurus Rex is an album by the American musician David Murray. It was released on the Red Baron label in 1993. It features performances by Murray, John Hicks, Ray Drummond, and Andrew Cyrille. Murray was not enthusiastic about many of the songs chosen by producer Bob Thiele. Poet George Hines contributed to the Miles Davis tribute, "Now He's Miles Away".

== Reception ==
Professional ratings
Review scores
Source	Rating
AllMusic	3/5 stars
The Indianapolis Star	3/4 stars

The Indianapolis Star wrote that "Ballad for David" "shows Murray evoking the titan Ben Webster in his breathy, urgent tone." The Record noted that "Murray has never been a particularly melodic improvisor and his harsh tone grows wearisome after several cuts."

The AllMusic review by Scott Yanow stated: "The poet G'ar's narration on a blues 'Now He's Miles Away' (a tribute to Miles Davis) is a bit trivial but only a minor flaw for this worthwhile David Murray set."

== Track listing ==
1. "Eternal Triangle" (Stitt) - 7:14
2. "Chelsea Bridge" (Strayhorn) - 11:20
3. "Jazzosaurus Rex" (Osser) - 6:10
4. "Mingus in the Poconos" (Murray) - 9:47
5. "Dinosaur Park Blues" (Osser) - 5:27
6. "Ballad for David" (Drummond) - 5:45
7. "Now He's Miles Away" (George Hines, Murray) - 4:45

- Recorded August 18, 1993, in NYC

== Personnel ==
- David Murray - tenor saxophone
- John Hicks - piano
- Ray Drummond - bass
- Andrew Cyrille - drums
