= Duality (Peter Leitch and John Hicks album) =

Studio album by Peter Leitch and John Hicks
- Released: 1994
- Recorded: June 1–2, 1994
- Studio: Van Gelder Recording Studio, Englewood Cliffs, New Jersey
- Genre: Jazz
- Length: 71:03
- Label: Reservoir

John Hicks chronology
Gentle Rain (1994)	Duality (1994)	Akari (1994)

Duality is an album by guitarist Peter Leitch and pianist John Hicks that was recorded in 1994.

== Recording and music ==
The album was recorded at Rudy Van Gelder Studio, Englewood Cliffs, New Jersey, on June 1 and 2, 1994. It is a duet album played by guitarist Peter Leitch and pianist John Hicks. The material is a mix of standards, relatively unknown compositions, and pieces written by each of the musicians.

== Release and reception ==
Professional ratings
Review scores
Source	Rating
AllMusic	4.5/5 stars
The Penguin Guide to Jazz Recordings	3/4 stars

Duality was released by Reservoir Records. The AllMusic reviewer concluded that "Leitch, a lyrical player in the style of Jim Hall, is beautifully complemented by Hicks' piano technique."

== Track listing ==
1. "Pas De Trois" – 7:11
2. "Epistrophy" – 6:23
3. "For B.C." – 6:45
4. "H&L" – 7:13
5. "O'Grand Amour" – 8:59
6. "Dancing in the Dark" – 5:21
7. "Last Night when We Were Young" – 5:00
8. "Duality" – 6:32
9. "After the Morning" – 6:52
10. "Chelsea Bridge" – 4:49
11. "I Hear a Rhapsody" – 5:58

== Personnel ==
- Peter Leitch – guitar
- John Hicks – piano
