= Beyond Expectations =

Studio album by John Hicks
- Recorded: September 1, 1993
- Studio: Van Gelder Studio, Englewood Cliffs, New Jersey
- Genre: Jazz
- Label: Reservoir

John Hicks chronology
Moanin': Portrait of Art Blakey (1992)	Beyond Expectations (1993)	Lover Man: A Tribute to Billie Holiday (1993)

Beyond Expectations is a trio album led by pianist John Hicks, recorded in 1993.

== Recording and release ==
The album was recorded at Rudy Van Gelder Studio, Englewood Cliffs, New Jersey, on September 1, 1993. The musicians were pianist John Hicks, bassist Ray Drummond, and drummer Marvin "Smitty" Smith.

Beyond Expectations was released by Reservoir Records.

== Reception ==
Professional ratings
Review scores
Source	Rating
AllMusic	3/5 stars
The Penguin Guide to Jazz	3.5/4 stars

The AllMusic reviewer criticised the conservative choice of material, writing that "Some of Hicks' '90s albums placed too much emphasis on overdone warhorses, and that is true of Beyond Expectations". The Penguin Guide to Jazz observed: "By this point in his career, Hicks records come with all sorts of expectations attached [...] and this one confounds none of them, an utterly professional performance from a seasoned performer."

== Track listing ==
1. "Expectations"
2. "Once I Loved"
3. "Ev'ry Time We Say Goodbye"
4. "There Is No Greater Love"
5. "Up Jumped Spring"
6. "Peace"
7. "Stella by Starlight"
8. "Au Privave"
9. "Turn Out the Stars"
10. "Bouncing with Bud"

== Personnel ==
- John Hicks – piano
- Ray Drummond – bass
- Marvin "Smitty" Smith – drums
