= Something to Live For: A Billy Strayhorn Songbook =

Studio album by John Hicks
- Released: October 20, 1998
- Recorded: June 17, 1997
- Studio: Audiomation Studio (Pittsburgh, PA)
- Genre: Jazz
- Length: 65:57
- Label: HighNote; HCD 7019
- Producer: Cecil Brooks III

John Hicks chronology
Newklear Music (1997)	Something to Live For: A Billy Strayhorn Songbook (1998)	Nightwind: An Erroll Garner Songbook (1997)

Something to Live For: A Billy Strayhorn Songbook is an album by the pianist John Hicks, recorded in 1997 and released on the HighNote label. The album contains ten compositions by Billy Strayhorn, along with two by Hicks.

== Reception ==
AllMusic wrote that Hicks "shows his softer side here, tackling the lush romanticism of Strayhorn's timeless compositions with an appropriately light touch and sense of nuance". JazzTimes called it "a fine stroll through familiar Strayhorn terrain that pays substantial dividends".

Professional ratings
Review scores
Source	Rating
AllMusic	4/5 stars
The Penguin Guide to Jazz Recordings	3/4 stars

== Track listing ==
All compositions by Billy Strayhorn except as indicated

1. "Something to Live For" (Duke Ellington, Billy Strayhorn) - 5:44
2. "Day Dream" (Ellington, Strayhorn John La Touche) - 6:40
3. "Medley: Lotus/Blossom" - 4:08
4. "Blood Count" - 6:59
5. "A Flower Is a Lovesome Thing" - 3:07
6. "Chelsea Bridge" - 6:10
7. "Lush Life" - 6:05
8. "U.M.M.G. (Upper Manhattan Medical Group)" - 5:30
9. "Minor Blues" (John Hicks) - 4:33
10. "Passion Flower" - 6:42
11. "Satin Doll" (Ellington, Strayhorn, Johnny Mercer) - 5:23
12. "Summary" (Hicks) - 4:56

== Personnel ==
- John Hicks - piano
- Dwayne Dolphin - bass
- Cecil Brooks III - drums

=== Production ===
- Cecil Brooks III - producer
- Dino DeStefano - engineer
