= Cry Me a River (album) =

Studio album by John Hicks
- Recorded: June 27, 1997
- Studio: Clinton Recording Studios, Studio A, New York City
- Genre: Jazz
- Label: Venus
- Producer: Tetsuo Hara, Todd Barkan

John Hicks chronology
Nightwind: An Erroll Garner Songbook (1997)	Cry Me a River (1997)	Trio + Strings (1997)

Cry Me a River is an album led by pianist John Hicks, with bassist Dwayne Burno and drummer Victor Lewis.

== Background ==
"John Hicks was very much in demand during the last two decades of his life, often releasing several CDs annually for a variety of labels."

== Recording and music ==
The album was recorded at Clinton Recording Studios, Studio A, New York City, on June 27, 1997. It was produced by Tetsuo Hara and Todd Barkan.

The trio was Hicks (piano), Dwayne Burno (bass), and Victor Lewis (drums). "Most of the session focuses on ballads, highlighted by his spacious, insightful scoring of 'Beautiful Love' and a strolling, bluesy take of the usually bittersweet 'You Don't Know What Love Is'."

== Reception ==
Professional ratings
Review scores
Source	Rating
AllMusic	4/5 stars

The AllMusic reviewer concluded that the recording "leaves the listener wanting more from the trio".

== Track listing ==
1. "Witchcraft"
2. "Softly, as in a Morning Sunrise"
3. "Beautiful Love"
4. "I'm Getting Sentimental Over You"
5. "Cry Me a River"
6. "Alone Together"
7. "You Don't Know What Love Is"
8. "Moon and Sand"
9. "'C' Jam Blues"

== Personnel ==
- John Hicks – piano
- Dwayne Burno – bass
- Victor Lewis – drums
