= Nilva Records =

Swiss jazz record label

Nilva Records was a jazz record label in Geneva, Switzerland established by drummer Alvin Queen. The name is an anagram of Queen's first name.

== History ==
Queen ran Nilva for ten years, then stopped during the 1990s when there were complications with distribution. Inspired by the "Blue Note sound", he began recording in the early 1980s at Minot Studios in White Plains, New York. The first album released was Alvin Queen in Europe (1981). This was followed by Ashanti and albums by Charles Davis, Ray Drummond, Junior Mance, and Bill Saxton.

== Discography ==
- NQ 3401: Alvin Queen – In Europe (1980)
- NQ 3402: Alvin Queen – Ashanti (1981)
- NQ 3403: Alvin Queen – Glidin' and Stridin' (1982)
- NQ 3404: Khaliq Al-Rouf & Salaam – Elephant Trot Dance (1979)
- NQ 3405: Junior Mance & Martin Rivera – The Tender Touch (1983)
- NQ 3406: John Patton – Soul Connection (1983)
- NQ 3407: Alvin Queen & Dusko Goykovich – A Day in Holland (1983)
- NQ 3408: Bill Saxton – Beneath the Surface (1984)
- NQ 3409: Ray Drummond – Susanita (1984)
- NQ 3410: Charles Davis – Super 80 (1984)
- NQ 3411: Bob Cunningham – Walking Bass (1985)
- NQ 3412: John Collins – The Incredible John Collins (1985)
- NQ 3413: Alvin Queen – Jammin' Uptown (1985)
- NQ 3414: Ronnie Mathews – So Sorry Please (1985)
- NQ 3415: Ray Drummond – Maya's Dance (1989)
- NQ 3416: Edmund J. Wood – Immanent Domain (1985)
- NQ 3417: Piano Seven (Thierry Lang) – Live! (1988)
- NQ 3418: Raymond Court – Beautiful Friendship (1988)
- NQ 3419: John Hicks & Elise Wood – Luminous (1988)
- NQ 3420: Moncef Genoud – Waiting for Birth (1989)
- NQ 3421: Alvin Queen – I'm Back (1992)
