= Purpose (Curtis Lundy album) =

Studio album by Curtis Lundy
- Released: 2002
- Recorded: October 1 and 2, 2001
- Studio: Sound on Sound Studios, New York City
- Genre: Jazz
- Length: 1:00:21
- Label: Justin Time; JUST 175-2

Curtis Lundy chronology
Against All Odds (1999)	Purpose (2002)

Purpose is an album by double bassist Curtis Lundy. It was recorded on October 1 and 2, 2001, at Sound on Sound Studios in New York City, and was released in 2002 by Justin Time Records. On the album, Lundy is joined by saxophonist Mark Shim, vibraphonist Steve Nelson, pianists John Hicks and Anthony Wonsey, and drummer Billy Hart.

== Reception ==
Professional ratings
Review scores
Source	Rating
All About Jazz	4/5 stars
AllMusic	4/5 stars
The Penguin Guide to Jazz Recordings	3.5/4 stars

In a review for AllMusic, Ken Dryden wrote: "Lundy only occasionally steps into the studio to lead his own record date, but the bassist never disappoints... The obvious interaction among the participants in their interpretations of this mostly new material makes this CD one that stands up very well to repeated hearings."

The authors of The Penguin Guide to Jazz Recordings called the album "the best" of Lundy's recordings to date, and stated that "Oveida" "deserves minor modern classic status."

Harvey Siders of JazzTimes noted Lundy's "beauty of tone" and "instinct for swing," stating that his "purpose here is to blend five other like-minded veterans and newcomers." He praised "Blues for J.A.," in which "Lundy reveals the sheer joy and power of straightahead walking that conjures up the abandon of Leroy Vinnegar."

Writing for All About Jazz, Jim Santella remarked: "As if working a nightclub session in the wee hours of the morning, Curtis Lundy's quintet purrs with a smooth sound and a subtle, but forceful, rhythmic drive... Mainstream jazz is in good hands."

== Track listing ==
1. "Snake Eyes" (Mark Shim) – 7:57
2. "Shape Shifting" (Steve Nelson) – 5:49
3. "A Walk in Serendipity" (Curtis Lundy) – 7:26
4. "Love Transforms" (Curtis Lundy) – 6:08
5. "Two Heartbeats" (John Hicks) – 5:36
6. "Oveida" (Curtis Lundy) – 9:13
7. "Pas de Trois" (Paul Arslanian) – 7:54
8. "Blues for J.A." (Curtis Lundy) – 5:24
9. "Carmen" (Anthony Wonsey) – 4:54

== Personnel ==
- Curtis Lundy – double bass
- Mark Shim – tenor saxophone
- Steve Nelson – vibraphone
- John Hicks – piano (tracks 3, 5, 7)
- Anthony Wonsey – piano (tracks 1–2, 4, 6, 8–9)
- Billy Hart – drums
