= Rhythm-a-Ning (album) =

Live album by Kenny Barron-John Hicks Quartet
- Released: 1990
- Recorded: September 3, 1989
- Venue: Riverside Park Arts Festival, NYC
- Genre: Jazz
- Length: 68:29
- Label: Candid; CCD 79044
- Producer: Mark Morganelli

Kenny Barron chronology
Bird Songs (1988)	Rhythm-a-Ning (1990)	The Only One (1990)

John Hicks chronology
Oleo (1989)	Rhythm-a-Ning (1989)	Power Trio (1990)

Rhythm-a-Ning is a live album by pianists Kenny Barron and John Hicks recorded as part of the 5th Annual Riverside Park Arts Festival in 1989 and released on the Candid label.

== Reception ==
Professional ratings
Review scores
Source	Rating
Allmusic	4/5 stars
The Penguin Guide to Jazz Recordings	3.5/4 stars

In his review on Allmusic, Scott Yanow noted "Kenny Barron and John Hicks are both well-respected veteran pianists whose styles fall well within the modern mainstream of jazz ... Although it can be fun to figure out who is playing what when, Barron and Hicks have such complementary styles that they often sound like one pianist with four hands".

== Track listing ==
1. "Sunshower" (Kenny Barron) – 12:44
2. "Naima's Love Song" (John Hicks) – 14:08
3. "Blue Monk" (Thelonious Monk) – 14:17
4. "After the Morning" (Hicks) – 12:05
5. "Ghost of Yesterday" (Arthur Herzog Jr., Irene Kitchings) – 5:36
6. "Rhythm-a-Ning" (Monk) – 9:49

== Personnel ==
- Kenny Barron, John Hicks (tracks 1–4 & 6) – Steinway grand piano
- Walter Booker – bass
- Jimmy Cobb – drums
