= Oleo (New York Unit album) =

Studio album by New York Unit
- Recorded: January 29, 1989
- Studio: A&R Recording Studios, New York City
- Genre: Jazz
- Label: CBS/Sony

John Hicks chronology
Naima's Love Song (1988)	Oleo (1989)	Rhythm-a-Ning (1989)

Oleo is an album by New York Unit, consisting of tenor saxophonist George Adams, pianist John Hicks, bassist Richard Davis, and drummer Tatsuya Nakamura. It was recorded in 1989.

== Recording and music ==
The album was recorded at A&R Recording Studios in New York City, on January 29, 1989.

== Release ==
Oleo was released by CBS/Sony in Japan.

== Track listing ==
1. "Jumonji"
2. "Oleo"
3. "Dance of the Matador"
4. "Hick's Time"
5. "Ballad #4"
6. "C Jam Blues"

== Personnel ==
- George Adams – tenor sax
- John Hicks – piano
- Richard Davis – bass
- Tatsuya Nakamura – drums
