= Alvin Queen =

American-born Swiss jazz drummer (born 1950)

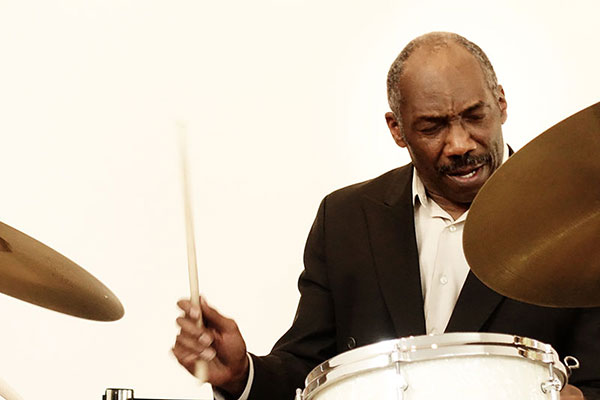
- Alvin Queen, Aarhus, Denmark, 2016

Background information
- Born: August 16, 1950; Bronx, New York, U.S.
- Genres: Jazz
- Occupation(s): Musician, label owner
- Instrument: Drums
- Years active: 1966–present
- Labels: Nilva
- Website: www.alvinqueen.com

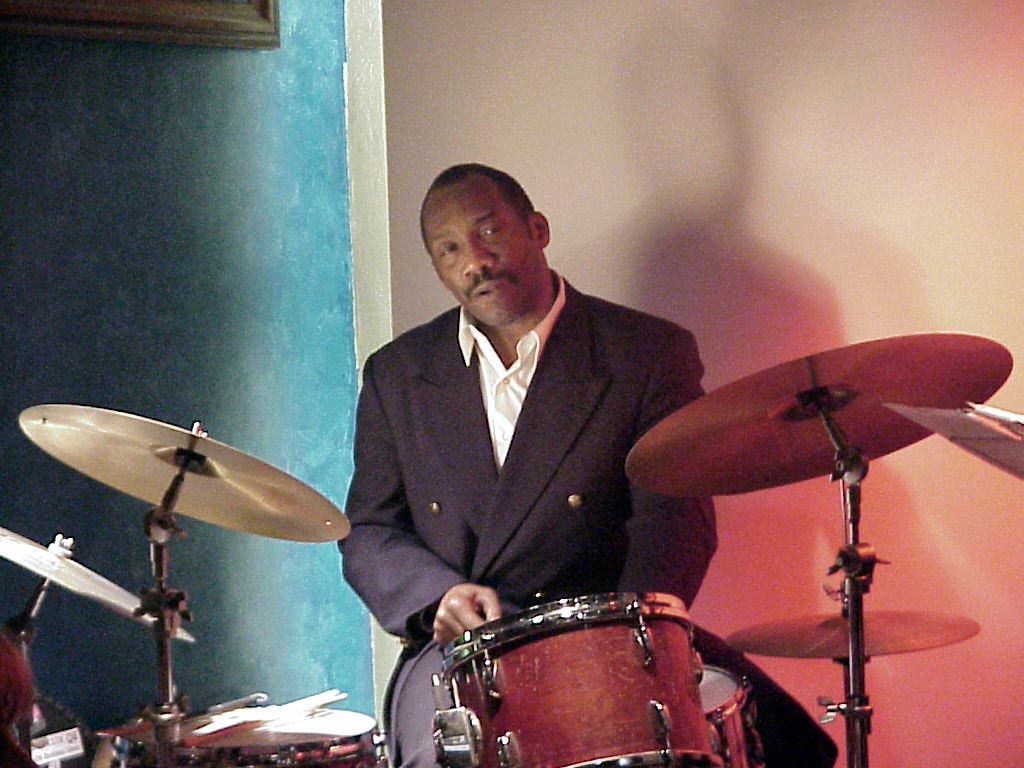
Alvin Queen in Dachau, 2001

Alvin Queen is an American-born Swiss jazz drummer born in the Bronx, New York, on August 16, 1950. At 16, he played for Ruth Brown and Don Pullen and with the Wild Bill Davis trio. He played with trombonist Benny Green and guitarist Tiny Grimes in 1969 and replaced Billy Cobham in the Horace Silver quintet. He also played with the George Benson quartet before rejoining Charles Tolliver in November 1971. During the seventies, he lived in Canada, before settling in Switzerland in 1979 and creating the label Nilva, an anagram of his first name.

He has also played with Michael Brecker, Kenny Drew, Oscar Peterson, Bennie Wallace, Duško Gojković, Johnny Griffin, and George Coleman.

== Discography ==
=== As leader ===
- Alvin Queen in Europe (Nilva, 1980)
- Ashanti (Nilva, 1981)
- Glidin' and Stridin' (Nilva, 1981) with Junior Mance
- A Day in Holland (Nilva, 1983) with Dusko Goykovich
- Lenox and Seventh (Black & Blue, 1985) with Dr. Lonnie Smith
- Jammin' Uptown (Nilva, 1985)
- I'm Back (Nilva, 1992)
- I Ain't Looking at You (Justin Time, 2005)
- Mighty Long Way (Justin Time, 2008)
- Night Train To Copenhaguen (Stunt Records, 2021)
- Feeling Good (Stunt Records, 2024)

=== As sideman ===
With George Coleman

- At Yoshi's (Theresa, 1989)

With Eddie "Lockjaw" Davis

- Jaw's Blues (Enja, 1981)

With John Hicks and Elise Wood

- Luminous (Nilva, 1988)

With Horace Parlan

- Pannonica (Enja, 1981 [1984])

With John Patton

- Soul Connection (Nilva, 1983)

With Pharoah Sanders

- A Prayer Before Dawn (Theresa, 1987)

With Charles Tolliver

- Impact (Enja, 1972)
- Live at the Loosdrecht Jazz Festival (Strata-East, 1973)

With Warren Vaché

- Talk to Me Baby (Muse, 1996)

==== With Pierre Boussaguet ====
- Charme (Polydor 1998)
