= 29th Street Saxophone Quartet =

The 29th Street Saxophone Quartet was an American saxophone quartet. Established in 1982, the ensemble's members included alto saxophonists Bobby Watson and Ed Jackson, tenor saxophonist Rich Rothenberg (in more recent years, Willie Williams), and baritone saxophonist Jim Hartog. The group has performed an eclectic repertoire, including jazz, show tunes, funk, rap, and original experimental works. Throughout the 1980s and 1990s the band toured in Britain, Europe, Turkey, Canada and in the United States.

== Critical reception ==
In an early review of the band's first extended engagement in New York City in 1984, John S. Wilson of The New York Times wrote, "The ensemble playing is clean, precise and tightly together, but the solos are filled with slashing, exuberant abandon. At times it is the very essence of loose, free jazz but it also uses the heavy, stylized sound of Stan Kenton's saxophone writing. The four musicians are choreographed in shifting formations to spotlight soloists and in dance movements that extend the musical movements."

The Glasgow Herald said "the ensemble's cohesiveness and the high quality of solo playing made everything the four men played worthy of note." The group maintained an international presence and recorded several CDs and is still in existence today.

== Discography ==
- Pointillistic Groove (Osmosis, 1984)
- Watch Your Step (New Note, 1986)
- The Real Deal (New Note, 1987)
- Live (Red, 1989)
- Underground (Antilles, 1991)
- Your Move (Antilles, 1992)
- Milano New York Bridge (Red, 1993)
