= Gentle Rain (John Hicks album) =

Studio album by John Hicks
- Recorded: May 10, 11, 1994
- Studios: Acoustic Recording, Brooklyn, New York
- Genre: Jazz
- Label: Sound Hills

John Hicks chronology
Lover Man: A Tribute to Billie Holiday (1993)	Gentle Rain (1994)	Duality (1994)

Gentle Rain is a trio album led by pianist John Hicks, recorded in 1994.

== Recording and music ==
The album was recorded at Acoustic Recording, Brooklyn, New York, on May 10 and 11, 1994. The musicians were pianist John Hicks, bassist Walter Booker, and drummer Louis Hayes. "Missing You" is played at a slow tempo; "Countdown" is up-tempo.

== Release and reception ==
Professional ratings
Review scores
Source	Rating
The Virgin Encyclopedia of Jazz	2/5 stars

Gentle Rain was released by Sound Hills. The reviewer for Cadence Magazine reported that "the playing shows few surprises, but Hicks is clearly a master of his instrument, a commanding presence, in total control."

== Track listing ==
1. "Solar"
2. "Gentle Rain"
3. "We'll Be Together Again"
4. "Hi-Fly"
5. "That Old Devil Called Love"
6. "I'll Take Romance"
7. "Goodbye Pork Pie Hat"
8. "Countdown"
9. "Missing You"
10. "Ruby, My Dear"

== Personnel ==
- John Hicks – piano
- Walter Booker – bass
- Louis Hayes – drums
