= Elise Wood =

American jazz flautist

Elise Wood is a jazz flautist. She studied classical flute in Philadelphia. In the 1970s, she moved from there to New York. There, she played in jazz groups, including with bassist Vishnu Wood. They married, but were leading separate lives by the early 1980s.

From 1983, Wood was frequently a member of groups led by pianist John Hicks. As a duo, they played mostly jazz, but also some classical music. They formed a business partnership – John Hicks-Elise Wood, Inc. – and toured the US, Europe and Japan in the 1980s. The couple married in 2001. Her first album as (co-)leader was Luminous, on which she played C and alto flute. A further album co-led with Hicks was Beautiful Friendship, recorded in 2000.

== Discography ==
=== As leader/co-leader ===
- Luminous (Nilva, 1985–88)
- Beautiful Friendship (HiWood, 2000)

=== As sidewoman ===
With John Hicks

- In Concert (Theresa, 1984)
- Single Petal of a Rose (Mapleshade, 1992)
- In the Mix (Landmark, 1994)
- Piece for My Peace (Landmark, 1996)
- Trio + Strings (Mapleshade, 1997)
- Sweet Love of Mine (HighNote, 2006)
