= Bobby Watson (American musician) =

American saxophonist, composer, and educator

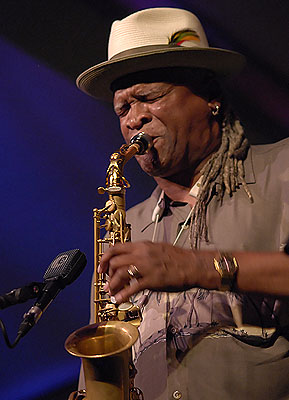
- Watson performing in 2008

Background information
- Born: Robert Michael Watson Jr. August 23, 1953 (age 72); Lawrence, Kansas, U.S.
- Genres: Jazz
- Occupations: Musician, composer, educator
- Instrument: Saxophone
- Years active: 1970s–present
- Labels: Roulette, Red, Blue Note, Columbia, Palmetto
- Website: bobbywatson.com

Robert Michael Watson Jr. (born August 23, 1953), known professionally as Bobby Watson, is an American saxophonist, composer, and educator.

== Early life ==
Watson was born in Lawrence, Kansas, United States, and grew up in Kansas City, Kansas. He had four brothers. Watson credits his father as one of his greatest inspirations. His father played saxophone in addition to being a pilot and working for the Federal Aviation Administration. The family moved to Minneapolis, Minnesota, for his father's work with the FAA. While Watson was in junior high school there, a jazz history class he took helped him realize he was a jazz musician.

== Music career ==
He attended the University of Miami, at the same time as Pat Metheny, Jaco Pastorius, and Bruce Hornsby. He graduated in 1975, moved to New York City, and became music director for the Jazz Messengers from 1977 to 1981. After leaving the band, he was productive as a session musician, recording with Wynton Marsalis, Branford Marsalis, Max Roach, Joe Williams, Dianne Reeves, Lou Rawls, Betty Carter, and Carmen Lundy. He formed the band Bobby Watson & Horizon with bassist Curtis Lundy and drummer Victor Lewis, with whom he played throughout the 1980s and 1990s. In 1991, they released the album Post Motown Bop on Blue Note Records, with John Fordham in Q Magazine describing it as "gleaming, glossy bebop".

Watson also led a group known as the High Court of Swing (a tribute to the music of Johnny Hodges), the sixteen-piece Tailor-Made Big Band, and is a founding member of the 29th Street Saxophone Quartet, an all-horn, four-piece group with alto saxophonist Ed Jackson, tenor saxophonist Rich Rothenberg, and baritone saxophonist Jim Hartog. Watson also composed a song for the soundtrack to the movie A Bronx Tale (1993).

A resident of New York for most of his professional life, he served as a member of the adjunct faculty and taught saxophone privately at William Paterson University from 1985 to 1986 and the Manhattan School of Music from 1996 to 1999. He is involved with the Thelonious Monk Institute's annual Jazz in America high school outreach program.

In 2000, he was approached to return to his native midwestern surroundings on the Kansas-Missouri border. Watson was selected as the first William D. and Mary Grant/Missouri, Distinguished Professorship in Jazz Studies. As the director of jazz studies at the University of Missouri–Kansas City Conservatory of Music, while still managing a worldwide performing schedule, Watson's ensembles at UMKC have received several awards. Watson spent the 2019-2020 academic year as a Global Jazz Ambassador for UMKC. He retired from UMKC in 2020 and remains a Kansas City resident as he continues to tour internationally as a musician.

== Honors ==
In 2011, Watson was inducted into the Kansas Music Hall of Fame. In 2013, he received the Benny Golson Jazz Master Award from Howard University. On his 61st birthday, he was one of two living inductees into the American Jazz Walk of Fame in its first group of inductees in 2014.

== Discography ==
=== As leader ===
- Estimated Time of Arrival (Roulette, 1978)
- All Because of You (Roulette, 1979)
- Beatitudes (New Note, 1983) with Curtis Lundy
- Jewel (Amigo, 1983)
- Advance (Enja, 1985)
- Appointment in Milano (Red, 1985)
- Roundtrip (Red, 1985)
- Gumbo (Amigo, 1985)
- Love Remains (Red, 1986)
- The Year of the Rabbit (New Note, 1987)
- The Inventor (Blue Note, 1989)
- This Little Light of Mine (Red Records, 1991)
- Post-Motown Bop (Blue Note, 1991)
- Present Tense (Columbia, 1992)
- Tailor Made (Columbia, 1993)
- Midwest Shuffle (Columbia, 1994)
- Urban Renewal (Kokopelli, 1995)
- Live & Learn (Palmetto, 2001)
- Old Friends New Point (City Light, 2002)
- From the Heart (Palmetto, 2007)
- Made in America (Smoke Sessions, 2017)
- Bird at 100 (Smoke Sessions, 2019)
- Keepin' It Real (Smoke Sessions, 2020)
- Back Home in Kansas City (Smoke Sessions, 2022)

=== As sideman ===
With the 29th Street Saxophone Quartet

- Pointillistic Groove (Osmosis, 1984)
- The Real Deal (New Note, 1987)
- Underground (Antilles, 1991)

With Art Blakey

- Gypsy Folk Tales (Roulette, 1977)
- In My Prime Vol. 1 (Timeless, 1977)
- In My Prime Vol. 2 (Timeless, 1977)
- In This Korner (Concord Jazz, 1978)
- Reflections in Blue (Timeless, 1978)
- Night in Tunisia: Digital Recording (Philips, 1979)
- Live at Montreux and Northsea (Timeless, 1980)
- One by One (Palcoscenico, 198)
- Art Blakey in Sweden (Amigo, 1981)
- Album of the Year (Timeless, 1981)
- Straight Ahead (Concord Jazz, 1981)

With others

- Ricky Ford, Interpretations (Muse, 1982)
- Louis Hayes, Light and Lively (SteepleChase, 1989)
- John Hicks, Naima's Love Song (DIW, 1988)
- John Hicks, Piece for My Peace (Landmark, 1995)
- The Leaders, Spirits Alike (Double Moon, 2006)
- Curtis Lundy, Just Be Yourself (New Note, 1987)
- Curtis Lundy, Against All Odds (Justin Time, 1999)
- Sam Rivers, Colours (Black Saint, 1982)
- Bernie Senensky, Wheel Within a Wheel (Timeless, 1993)
- Superblue, Superblue (Blue Note, 1988)
- Jack Walrath, Journey, Man! (Evidence, 1995)
