= Evidence Music =

American record label

- Founded: 1991
- Founder: Howard Rosen, Jerry Gordon
- Genre: Jazz, blues
- Country of origin: U.S.

Evidence Music is an American jazz and blues record label founded in 1991 by Howard Rosen and Jerry Gordon. Rosen, formerly of the We Three record retail chain, and Gordon, owner of Philadelphia’s Third Street Jazz & Rock shop, were longtime record retailers and music enthusiasts who recognized strong demand for out-of-print and mid-price catalog titles and so they acquired rights to various catalogs, including material from the short-lived Pulsar imprint. The label's name comes from the song "Evidence" by Thelonious Monk.

The label's first releases were reissues of Sun Ra albums from the catalog of the Saturn label. The catalogue also includes Nat Adderley, Art Blakey, Gil Evans, Pharoah Sanders, and blues musicians Buddy Guy, Otis Rush, and Big Joe Turner.

Evidence has reissued recordings originally recorded and issued by the Bethlehem, Black & Blue, and Theresa labels.

The company later expanded into new studio recordings by contemporary blues and jazz artists while continuing its reissue program.

== See also ==
- Category:Evidence Music albums
