= Fritz Pauer =

Austrian composer and pianist (1943–2012)

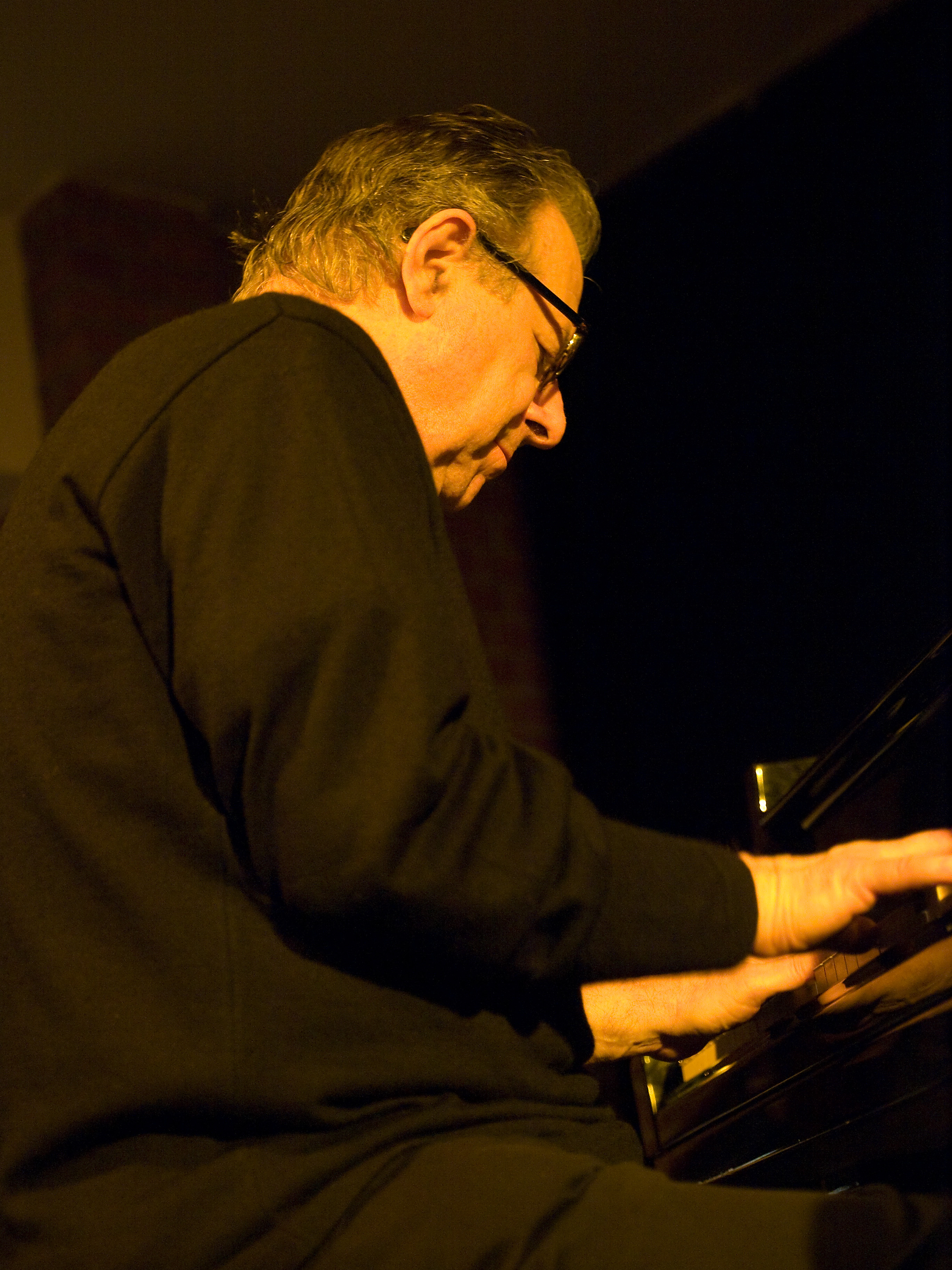
- Born: 14 October 1943; Vienna
- Died: 1 July 2012 (aged 68)
- Known for: Jazz Music

Fritz Pauer ( 14 October 1943 – July 1, 2012) was an Austrian jazz pianist, composer, and bandleader.

== Career ==
Born in Vienna, Pauer began his professional playing career as a teenager, performing with Hans Koller (1960–62) before leading his own ensembles in Berlin. In the 1960s he played with Don Byas, Booker Ervin, Art Farmer, Dexter Gordon, Friedrich Gulda, and Annie Ross. From 1968 to 1970 he taught at the Vienna Municipal Conservatory, and following this was a member of the ORF-Big Band. In the 1970s he recorded as a leader as well as with Klaus Weiss and Peter Herbolzheimer.

Pauer lived in Peru briefly in the mid-1980s, then moved to Switzerland in 1986. Later in life he became a university professor.

An early 2000s collaboration with Jay Clayton and Ed Neumeister was released as the album 3 for the Road.

== Discography ==
=== As leader/co-leader ===
- 3 for the Road (Meisteromusic)

=== As sideman ===
With Art Farmer

- Gentle Eyes (Mainstream, 1972)
- The Company I Keep (Arabesque, 1994) with Tom Harrell as composer and arranger
- The Meaning of Art (Arabesque, 1995) as composer and arranger
