= Geri Allen & Timeline Live =

Live album by Geri Allen & Timeline
- Released: 2010
- Recorded: February 7 & 12, 2009
- Venue: Reed College in Portland, Oregon and Oberlin Conservatory of Music in Oberlin, Ohio
- Genre: Jazz
- Label: Motéma MTM-42
- Producer: Geri Allen & Ora Harris

Geri Allen chronology
Flying Toward the Sound (2008)	Geri Allen & Timeline Live (2010)	A Child is Born (2011)

Geri Allen & Timeline Live is a live album by pianist Geri Allen and her group Timeline recorded in 2009 and released on the Motéma label in 2013. Bassist Kenny Davis, drummer Kassa Overall and dancer Maurice Chestnut make up the group.

== Reception ==
Professional ratings
Review scores
Source	Rating
The Guardian	4/5 stars

The Guardian review by John Fordham awarded the album 4 stars, stating, "This is the album for jazz fans to play at full volume to anybody who says the music can't be danced to any more". All About Jazz enthused, "Remember the time when jazz and dance were simpatico partners? Where swing and tap were intertwined with lively music and sweltering choreography in joints, halls, and clubs. Probably not, but pianist Geri Allen does, as she reflects on those past golden moments and dares to create new ones with Geri Allen & Timeline Live".

== Track listing ==
All compositions by Geri Allen except where noted.

1. "Philly Joe' – 15:53
2. "Four by Five" (McCoy Tyner) – 4:47
3. "The Western Wall"/"Soul Eyes" (Geri Allen)/(Mal Waldron) – 7:12
4. "LWB's House" – 3:37
5. "Embraceable You"/"Lover Man" (George Gershwin, Ira Gershwin)/(Jimmy Davis, James Sherman, Ram Ramirez) – 12:35
6. "Ah-Leu-Cha" (Charlie Parker) – 9:53
7. "In Appreciation" – 6:38

== Personnel ==
- Geri Allen – piano
- Kenny Davis – bass
- Kassa Overall – drums
- Maurice Chestnut – tap percussion
