= The Company I Keep =

Studio album by Art Farmer with Tom Harrell
- Released: 1994
- Recorded: January 11–12, 1994
- Studio: Hip Pocket Recording Studios, NYC
- Genre: Jazz
- Length: 61:15
- Label: Arabesque; AJ-0112
- Producer: Helen Keane

Art Farmer chronology
Live at Sweet Basil (1994)	The Company I Keep (1994)	The Meaning of Art (1995)

The Company I Keep (subtitled Art Farmer Meets Tom Harrell) is an album by trumpeters Art Farmer and Tom Harrell which was recorded in 1994 and released on the Arabesque label.

== Reception ==
Professional ratings
Review scores
Source	Rating
AllMusic	4/5 stars

The AllMusic review by Scott Yanow said "although few fireworks occur (the two brassmen mostly sound pretty complementary and mellow), the music is tasteful, enjoyable advanced hard bop".

== Track listing ==
1. "Sunshine in the Rain" (Tom Harrell) – 7:02
2. "Song of the Canopy" (Geoff Keezer) – 8:15
3. "Santana" (Fritz Pauer) – 10:37
4. "Beside Myself" (Harrell) – 5:29
5. "Beyond" (Kenny Davis) – 6:01
6. "T.G.T.T. (Too Good to Title)" (Duke Ellington) – 6:58
7. "Who Knows" (Davis) – 8:22
8. "Turn Out the Stars" (Bill Evans, Gene Lees) – 8:52

== Personnel ==
- Art Farmer – flumpet
- Tom Harrell – trumpet, flugelhorn, arranger
- Ron Blake – tenor saxophone, soprano saxophone
- Geoff Keezer – piano, arranger
- Kenny Davis – double bass, arranger
- Carl Allen – drums
- Fritz Pauer – arranger
