= A Child Is Born (album) =

Studio album by Geri Allen
- Released: October 11, 2011
- Recorded: January 14–15 and April 27–28, 2011
- Studio: Union Country Performing Arts Center, Rahway, NJ and Klavierhaus, NYC
- Genre: Jazz, Christmas
- Length: 50:31
- Label: Motéma MTM-69
- Producer: Geri Allen & Kunle Mwanga

Geri Allen chronology
Geri Allen & Timeline Live (2009)	A Child Is Born (2011)	Grand River Crossings (2013)

A Child Is Born is an album of Christmas carols by pianist Geri Allen with vocalists recorded in 2011 and released on the Motéma label.

== Reception ==
Professional ratings
Review scores
Source	Rating
AllMusic	4/5 stars
The Guardian	3/5 stars
PopMatters	6/10 stars

AllMusic awarded the album 4 stars, stating, "this is a holiday collection for the more adventurous jazz piano fan, rather than for someone looking for a safe, warm, and fuzzy set of jazzed-up Christmas tunes". The Guardian review by John Fordham awarded the album 3 stars, noting, "Wherever you're coming from, this remains the work of a gifted improviser exploring timelessly haunting songs". PopMatters reviewer Josh Langhoff said, "Geri Allen’s mostly-solo, mostly-jazz-piano album A Child Is Born flows through traditional Christmas songs and hymns with much facility, some invention, and a couple of surprises"

== Track listing ==
All compositions Traditional except where noted.

1. "Angels We Have Heard On High" – 4:24
2. "A Child Is Born" (Thad Jones, Alec Wilder) – 3:43
3. "Imagining Gena at Sunrise" – 1:10
4. "O Come, O Come, Emmanuel" – 7:31
5. "Journey to Bethlehem" (Geri Allen) – 1:12
6. "We Three Kings" (John Henry Hopkins, Jr.) – 5:08
7. "Little Drummer Boy" (Katherine Kennicott Davis) – 5:00
8. "God Is With Us" (Allen) – 2:16
9. "Amazing Grace" (John Newton/Traditional) – 2:43
10. "Christmas Medley: Away in a Manger/What Child Is This?/Silent Night" (Traditional/William Chatterton Dix/Franz Xaver Gruber) – 4:32
11. "Imagining Gena At Sunset" – 0:32
12. "Let Us Break Bread Together" – 5:00
13. "It Came Upon a Midnight Clear" (Richard Storrs Willis) – 6:24
14. "O Come, O Come, Emmanuel" – 0:56

== Personnel ==
- Geri Allen – Fazioli piano, celeste, Farfisa organ, Fender Rhodes electric piano, Hohner clavinet
- Carolyn Brewer (tracks 5 & 8), Connaitre Miller (track 8), Barbara Roney (track 8) – vocals
- Farah Jasmine Griffin – spoken word (track 5)
- Women Of the Gee's Bend Quilt Collective sampled and engineered by Jaimeo Brown (track 4)
