= Homecoming (Art Farmer album) =

Studio album by Art Farmer
- Released: 1971
- Recorded: June 1971; New York City
- Genre: Jazz
- Length: 31:49
- Label: Mainstream; MRL 332
- Producer: Bob Shad

Art Farmer chronology
From Vienna with Art (1970)	Homecoming (1971)	Gentle Eyes (1972)

Homecoming is an album by Art Farmer recorded in the summer of 1971 and originally released on the Mainstream label.

== Reception ==
Professional ratings
Review scores
Source	Rating
AllMusic	3/5 stars

Ken Dryden of AllMusic states, "Not an essential album in the vast Farmer discography, but worth acquiring if found at a reasonable price, though it will be difficult".

== Track listing ==
1. "Homecoming" (Art Farmer) – 4:06
2. "Cascavelo" (Horst Mühlbradt) – 8:39
3. "Some Other Time" (Leonard Bernstein) – 5:53
4. "Blue Bossa" (Kenny Dorham) – 6:47
5. "Here's That Rainy Day" (Johnny Burke, Jimmy Van Heusen) – 6:26

== Personnel ==
- Art Farmer – flugelhorn
- Jimmy Heath – tenor saxophone, soprano saxophone, flute
- Cedar Walton – piano
- Sam Jones – bass
- Billy Higgins – drums
- Mtume – congas
- Warren Smith – percussion
