= Gentle Eyes =

Studio album by Art Farmer
- Released: 1972
- Recorded: 1972; Vienna, Austria
- Genre: Jazz
- Length: 48:49
- Label: Mainstream; MRL 371
- Producer: Bob Shad

Art Farmer chronology
Homecoming (1971)	Gentle Eyes (1972)	A Sleeping Bee (1974)

Gentle Eyes is an album by Art Farmer recorded in Austria in 1972 and originally released on the Mainstream label.

== Reception ==
Professional ratings
Review scores
Source	Rating
Allmusic	2/5 stars

Scott Yanow of Allmusic states, "this sleepy affair with a European string section is unremittingly dull... the arrangements for the 15 strings, five horns and rhythm section are quite boring. There are many rewarding Art Farmer dates currently available, so skip this misfire".

== Track listing ==
1. "A Time for Love" (Johnny Mandel, Paul Francis Webster) – 5:22
2. "Didn't We" (Jimmy Webb) – 3:07
3. "Soulsides" (Erich Kleinschuster) – 4:28
4. "So Are You" (Hans Salomon) – 3:36
5. "Song of No Regrets" (Sergio Mendes) – 4:59
6. "The Gentle Rain"(Luiz Bonfá) – 4:58
7. "We've Only Just Begun" (Roger Nichols, Paul Williams) – 3:17
8. "God Bless the Child" (Billie Holiday, Arthur Herzog, Jr.) – 4:54
9. "Gloomy Morning" (Salomon) – 5:19
10. "Gentle Eyes" (Fritz Pauer) – 3:28
11. "Some Other Time" (Leonard Bernstein, Betty Comden, Adolph Green) – 5:59

== Personnel ==
- Art Farmer – flugelhorn
- Robert Demmer, Robert Politzer – trumpet
- Garney Hicks – trombone
- Hans Low – alto flute
- Leszek Zadlo – soprano saxophone, tenor saxophone
- Hans Salomon – alto saxophone, bass clarinet
- Hans Grotzer, Toni Stricker – concertmaster
- Wladi Cermac, Paul Fickl, Johann Fuchs, Herbert Heide, Erich Koritschoner, Bruno Mayr, Kurt Plaschka, Wolfgang Reichert, Walter Topf – violin
- Heinz Fussganger, Bruno Schimann, Dagmar Sothje, Gerhard Zatschek – cello
- Fritz Pauer – piano, electric piano
- Richard Oesterreicher, Julius Scheybal – guitar
- Rudolf Hansen, Jimmy Woode – bass
- Erich Bachtragl – drums
- Jula Koch – percussion
- Stephanie – vocals
- Johannes Fehring – conductor
- Hans Salomon – arranger
