= Some Aspects of Water =

Live album by Geri Allen
- Released: July 1997
- Recorded: March 15 & 17, 1996
- Venue: Tønder Kulturhus, Tønder and SAS Falkoner Center, Copenhagen
- Genre: Jazz
- Length: 54:18
- Label: Storyville STCD 4212
- Producer: Ib Skovgaard

Geri Allen chronology
Twenty One (1994)	Some Aspects of Water (1997)	Eyes in the Back of Your Head (1997)

Some Aspects of Water is a live album by pianist Geri Allen recorded in 1996 in Denmark at concerts celebrating her award of the 1996 Jazzpar Prize and released on the Storyville label.

== Reception ==
Professional ratings
Review scores
Source	Rating
Allmusic	4.5/5 stars
The Penguin Guide to Jazz	3/4 stars

Allmusic awarded the album 4½ stars, stating, "Throughout the date, Geri Allen shows why she is one of post-bop's top stars. Highly recommended". JazzTimes stated "As an example both of Allen's sense of longer form and of larger ensembles, it is interesting-but frankly, its wholeness and beauty transcend such considerations". The Penguin Guide to Jazz criticized Allen's hesitant playing of standards, and thought some of her own pieces were patchy.

== Track listing ==
All compositions by Geri Allen except where noted.

1. "Feed the Fire" - 10:53
2. "A Beautiful Friendship" (Donald Kahn, Stanley Styne) - 9:34
3. "Old Folks" (Dedette Lee Hill, Willard Robison) - 9:30
4. "Smooth Attitudes" (Jens Winther) - 8:02
5. "Some Aspects of Water" - 18:51
6. "Skin" - 9:43

== Personnel ==
- Geri Allen - piano
- Palle Danielsson - bass
- Lenny White - drums
- Johnny Coles - flugelhorn (tracks 3–5)
- Henrik Bolberg Pedersen - trumpet, flugelhorn (tracks 4 & 5)
- Kjeld Ipsen - trombone (tracks 4 & 5)
- Axel Windfeld - tuba (tracks 4 & 5)
- Michael Hove - alto saxophone, flute, clarinet (tracks 4 & 5)
- Uffe Markussen - tenor saxophone, soprano saxophone, bass clarinet, flute (tracks 4 & 5)
