= The Life of a Song =

The Life of a Song may refer to:

- The Life of a Song (Joey + Rory album)
- The Life of a Song (Geri Allen album)
