= The Meaning of Art =

Studio album by Art Farmer
- Released: 1995
- Recorded: May 9–10, 1995
- Studio: Manhattan Beach Recording, NYC
- Genre: Jazz
- Length: 50:02
- Label: Arabesque; AJ-0118
- Producer: Helen Keane

Art Farmer chronology
The Company I Keep (1994)	The Meaning of Art (1995)	Silk Road (1997)

The Meaning of Art is an album by trumpeter Art Farmer which was recorded in 1995 and released on the Arabesque label.

== Reception ==
Professional ratings
Review scores
Source	Rating
AllMusic	4/5 stars

The AllMusic review by Michael G. Nastos said "This is jazz that is relatively cliché and quote-free; not groundbreaking, but a consistent, professional effort. The release is a testimony to Farmer's endurance as one of the truly great jazz musicians of the late 1900s. Recommended".

== Track listing ==
1. "On the Plane" (Slide Hampton) – 5:17
2. "Just the Way You Look Tonight" (Jerome Kern, Dorothy Fields) – 7:04
3. "Lift Your Spirit High" (Hampton) – 5:18
4. "One Day, Forever" (Benny Golson) – 6:30
5. "Free Verse" (Geoff Keezer) – 10:35
6. "Home" (Fritz Pauer) – 7:48
7. "Johnny One Note" (Richard Rodgers, Lorenz Hart) – 7:36

== Personnel ==
- Art Farmer – flumpet, arranger
- Slide Hampton – trombone, arranger
- Ron Blake – tenor saxophone, soprano saxophone
- Geoff Keezer – piano, arranger
- Kenny Davis – double bass
- Carl Allen – drums
- Fritz Pauer – arranger
