= Silk Road (album) =

Studio album by Art Farmer
- Released: September 2, 1997
- Recorded: June 12, 1996
- Studio: EastSide Sound, NYC
- Genre: Jazz
- Length: 55:37
- Label: Arabesque; AJ-0130
- Producer: Art Farmer, Daniel Criss

Art Farmer chronology
The Meaning of Art (1995)	Silk Road (1997)	Live at Stanford Jazz Workshop (1997)

Silk Road is an album by Art Farmer which was recorded in 1996 and released on the Arabesque label the following year.

== Reception ==
Professional ratings
Review scores
Source	Rating
AllMusic	4/5 stars

The AllMusic review by Scott Yanow said "Art Farmer has long been one of the most consistent of all brassmen. Playing the flumpet (which is a cross between a trumpet and a flugelhorn), Farmer is heard throughout this 1996 set in top form ... While his sidemen play quite well, the warm-toned and swinging Farmer is consistently the main star, and at age 68 he proves to still be in his prime". In JazzTimes, Jim Ferguson wrote "Richly melodic but bold, Farmer’s influential, distinctive approach is facilitated by his full-toned instrument-the flumpet, a cross between the trumpet and the fluegelhorn. Throughout this eight-tune set, he demonstrates that he is as adept at selecting material and personnel as he is at playing ... Rife with winning performances, Silk Road reflects the current state of one of jazz’s best".

== Track listing ==
1. "Tonk" (Ray Bryant) – 6:38
2. "Ancient Evening" (Geoff Keezer) – 8:26
3. "Stardust" (Hoagy Carmichael, Mitchell Parish) – 5:38
4. "Dance of the One" (Don Braden) – 7:34
5. "Silk Road" (Keezer) – 5:51
6. "Flashback" (Art Farmer) – 6:59
7. "I Let a Song Go Out of My Heart" (Duke Ellington, Irving Mills, Henry Nemo, John Redmond) – 7:50
8. "Coming Home" (Kenny Davis) – 6:41

== Personnel ==
- Art Farmer – flumpet
- Ron Blake, Don Braden – tenor saxophone, soprano saxophone
- Geoff Keezer – piano
- Kenny Davis – double bass
- Carl Allen – drums
