= Kenny Davis (musician) =

American jazz bassist (born 1961)

- Born: September 4, 1961 (age 65)
- Genre: Jazz
- Occupation: Bassist
- Formerly of: Out of the Blue

Kenny Davis (born September 4, 1961) is an American jazz bassist.

Davis released two albums as leader for Soul Note.

He was also member of the Blue Note Records group Out of the Blue and has appeared on albums by Gary Bartz, Art Farmer, Don Byron, Eric Person, Michele Rosewoman, Onaje Allan Gumbs and others.

Kenny is currently professor of Jazz Bass and Jazz History at the Mason Gross School of the Arts at Rutgers University in New Brunswick, New Jersey.

== Discography ==
=== As a member ===
Out of the Blue

- Live at Mt. Fuji (Blue Note, 1987) – live recorded at Mount Fuji Jazz Festival in 1986

=== As sideman ===
With Art Farmer

- The Company I Keep (Arabesque, 1994) also with Tom Harrell
- The Meaning of Art (Arabesque, 1995)
- Silk Road (Arabesque, 1997)

With others

- Geri Allen, Geri Allen & Timeline Live (Motema, 2010)
- Cecil Brooks III, Hangin' with Smooth (Muse, 1990)
- Uri Caine, Sphere Music (JMT, 1993)
- Regina Carter, Something for Grace (Atlantic, 1997)
- James Carter, Caribbean Rhapsody (EmArcy, 2011)
- Steve Coleman, The Tao of Mad Phat (Novus, 1993)
- Carla Cook, Simply Natural (Maxjazz, 2002)
- Robin Eubanks, Mental Images (JMT, 1994)
- Earl MacDonald, "Re:Visions - works for jazz orchestra" (Death Defying, 2010)
- Cassandra Wilson, Blue Light 'til Dawn (Blue Note, 1993)
