= Timeless Portraits and Dreams =

Studio album by Geri Allen
- Released: August 22, 2006
- Recorded: March 16–17, 2006
- Studio: Avatar Studio A, New York City
- Genre: Jazz
- Length: 62:11
- Label: Telarc CD-83645
- Producer: Elaine Martone & Geri Allen

Geri Allen chronology
The Life of a Song (2004)	Timeless Portraits and Dreams (2006)	Flying Toward the Sound (2008)

Timeless Portraits and Dreams is an album by pianist Geri Allen recorded in 2006 and released on the Telarc label.

== Reception ==
Professional ratings
Review scores
Source	Rating
Allmusic	4/5 stars
The Guardian	4/5 stars
The Penguin Guide to Jazz	2.5/4 stars

Allmusic awarded the album 4 stars, stating: "Geri Allen's musical interests prove to be quite diverse in Timeless Portraits and Dreams, delving into jazz, spirituals, sacred works and originals... While some jazz fans may prefer to hear Geri Allen in a strictly instrumental setting, they will miss out if they fail to investigate these stimulating sessions. Highly recommended". The Guardian review by John Fordham awarded the album 4 stars, observing: "Everything else on the album is uplifting – in the most free and least doctrinal sense". JazzTimes stated: "Allen’s unique, distinctive keyboard style shines brightly throughout this recording". All About Jazz enthused: "Throughout Timeless Portraits and Dreams, Allen's piano and Carter's bass keep the listener engaged. Cobb's drum work is subtle but effective. Lundy, Walden, Roney, Shirley and the Atlanta Jazz Chorus supplement the trio with great results". The Penguin Guide to Jazz acknowledged Allen's ambition, but commented that "the sheer grandness of some of these structures is their undoing".

== Track listing ==
All compositions by Geri Allen except as indicated

1. "Oh, Freedom" (Traditional) – 1:52
2. "Melchezedik" (Antoine Roney) – 7:06
3. "Portraits and Dreams" – 2:24
4. "Well Done" (Kenny Lattimore, Pat McClain) – 5:14
5. "La Strada" (Nino Rota) – 4:20
6. "I Have a Dream" (Mary Lou Williams) – 2:24
7. "Nearly" (Ron Carter) – 4:27
8. "In Real Time" (Allen, Wallace Roney) – 5:40
9. "Embraceable You" (George Gershwin, Ira Gershwin) – 2:45
10. "Ah-Leu-Cha" (Charlie Parker) – 4:48
11. "Just for a Thrill" (Lil Hardin Armstrong) – 4:21
12. "Our Lady (For Billie Holiday)" – 5:54
13. "Timeless Portraits and Dreams" – 5:04
14. "Portraits and Dreams (Reprise)" – 1:39
15. "Lift Every Voice and Sing" (James Weldon Johnson, John Rosamond Johnson) – 3:52 Bonus CD single

== Personnel ==
- Geri Allen – piano
- Ron Carter – bass (tracks 2–4, 6–12, 14 & 15)
- Jimmy Cobb – drums (tracks 2–4, 6–12, 14 & 15)
- Wallace Roney – trumpet (tracks 8 & 12)
- Donald Walden – tenor saxophone (track 6)
- Carmen Lundy – vocals (track 4 & 13)
- George Shirley – tenor (track 6 & 15)
- The Atlanta Jazz Chorus directed by Dwight Andrews (tracks 2, 4, 6, 13 & 15)
