= Geoffrey Keezer =

American jazz pianist (born 1970)

- Born: November 20, 1970 (age 55); Eau Claire, Wisconsin
- Genres: Jazz
- Occupation: Musician
- Instrument: Piano
- Labels: MarKeez Records, Open Studio Records, Sunnyside, Blue Note, Telarc, Maxjazz
- Website: geoffreykeezer.com

Geoffrey Keezer (born November 20, 1970) is an American jazz pianist. In 2023, he won the Best Instrumental Composition Grammy for Refuge

Keezer was playing in jazz clubs as a teenager, playing piano for Art Blakey at age 18 and touring with Joshua Redman, Benny Golson and Ray Brown in his 20s. He has toured with David Sanborn, Chris Botti, Joe Locke and Christian McBride and worked with vocalist Denise Donatelli, receiving Grammy Award nominations, and releasing albums influenced by Hawaiian, Okinawan, and Afro-Peruvian folk traditions.

His 2009 album Áurea was nominated for a Grammy Award for Best Latin Jazz Album; in 2010 he was nominated for Best Instrumental Arrangement Accompanying Vocalist(s) for "Don't Explain" on Denise Donatelli's album When Lights Are Low. In 2013 Keezer released his first solo piano album in 13 years, Heart of the Piano (Motéma Music).

== Early life ==
Born in Eau Claire, the son of Mary Ann Graham, a professional French Horn player, and Ronald Willard Keezer, a composer/percussionist and member of the music faculty at the University of Wisconsin-Eau Claire, Geoff Keezer attended Putnam Heights Elementary School, South Junior High School, and Memorial High School, graduating in 1988.

== Performing and recording ==
In 1989, after attending Berklee College of Music for one year, Keezer joined Art Blakey and the Jazz Messengers, becoming the last pianist to join the band. He composed and arranged original music for the group, with which he remained until Blakey's death in 1990. Keezer's debut album as a leader, Waiting in the Wings (Sunnyside) came out in 1989.

=== 1990s ===
Keezer joined the Art Farmer Quartet in 1990. The band performed at major North American jazz festivals and jazz clubs. Keezer served as musical director and arranger from 1994 to 1995. In 1997, Keezer became a member of bassist Ray Brown's trio. He toured the world with Brown, performing at clubs and major festivals in North America, Japan, Europe and the Middle East. The Ray Brown Trio played concerts with the Israel Philharmonic; the Radio Orchestra of Munich at the Weiner Konzerthaus and Conservatory in Vienna, Austria; and at Lincoln Center in New York City.

During the 1990s, he toured with The Key Players, featuring Mulgrew Miller, James Williams, Harold Mabern & Donald Brown; a performance of Gershwin's Rhapsody in Blue with the Hollywood Bowl Orchestra; a concert with the Gerry Mulligan Quartet at London's Albert Hall; a concert at Lincoln Center with Art Farmer and Wynton Marsalis; and performances with the Carnegie Hall Jazz Orchestra, the Slide Hampton All-Stars, Dizzy Gillespie, J. J. Johnson and many others. He also traveled many times to Japan, where he played with Ray Brown Michael Brecker, Pat Metheny and Kenny Burrell.

His second album, Curveball, came out in 1990 and featured Victor Lewis on drums; Charnett Moffett on bass and Steve Nelson on vibes. He returned the next year with Here & Now (Somethin' Else, 1991); followed by World Music (DIW, 1992); Other Spheres (DIW, 1993); Trio (Sackville, 1995); a duet album with Harold Mabern called For Phineas (Sackville, 1996); and Turn Up the Quiet (Sony, 1997), which featured rising stars Diana Krall, Joshua Redman and Christian McBride. Keezer also appeared on many albums as a sideman.

=== 2000s ===
From 2000 to 2009 Keezer performed on keyboards and piano in the Christian McBride Band. The band toured North America, Europe and Japan. Keezer contributed original compositions and arrangement. Concurrently, starting in 2002, Keezer joined saxophonist Tim Garland's Storms/Nocturnes project. The band played throughout the United Kingdom, including at Queen Elizabeth Hall in London; the Hollywell Music Room in Oxford; the Royal Northern College of Music in Manchester; and at the Cheltenham Jazz Festival. In 2004, Keezer traveled to Lima, Peru, to play with Maria Schneider. This visit to Peru would later provide the inspiration for his GRAMMY-nominated album Aurea.

The following year saw Keezer again touring the world, this time with saxophonist David Sanborn. Then in 2007, Keezer began playing with Grammy Award-winning trumpeter Chris Botti, a relationship that continues to this day. That same year, Keezer received a grant from Chamber Music America to develop a new jazz work. In 2009, Keezer joined the band of fellow Art Blakey alumnus Wayne Shorter, subbing for an injured Danilo Perez. Keezer played at the Playboy Jazz Festival and at festivals in Ottawa and Montreal as a member of the Wayne Shorter Quartet.

His albums include the solo piano recording Zero One (Dreyfus, 2000), as well as Sublime: Honoring the Music of Hank Jones (Telarc, 2003), a series of duets with pianists Kenny Barron, Chick Corea, Benny Green and Mulgrew Miller. Other albums include Falling Up (Maxjazz, 2003) with Hawaiian slack key guitarist Keola Beamer; Free Association (ArtistShare, 2005) with guitarist Jim Hall; Wildcrafted: Live at the Dakota (MaxJazz, 2005); Live in Seattle (Origin, 2006); an album with Okinawan singer Yasukatsu Oshima; a collaboration with electronica artist Mary Acheta called The Near Forever (2009); and Áurea (ArtistShare, 2009), which was nominated for a 2009 Grammy Award for Best Latin Jazz Album.

=== 2010–present ===
In 2010, Keezer was nominated for his second Grammy Award, for Best Instrumental Arrangement Accompanying Vocalist(s), for the track "Don't Explain" on Denise Donatelli's When Lights Are Low. From 2012 to 2013, Keezer played concerts in Hawaii and across North America as part of the "Malama Ko Aloha" tour featuring Hawaiian slack-key guitarist Keola Beamer and native American flute player R. Carlos Nakai.

Recordings from this period include Mill Creek Road (SBE, 2011); Via (Origin, 2011) with Joe Locke on vibes and Tim Garland on saxophone; Signing (Motéma, 2012) also with Locke; and his latest solo piano recording, Heart of the Piano (Motéma, 2013).

Since 2016, Keezer has frequently performed with his wife, vocalist Gillian Margot.

== Television ==
Keezer appeared on German television in 1989 with Art Blakey. In 1995, he appeared on NBC's Today Show as part of the Terence Blanchard Quintet. In the late 1990s, he played on German, French and Swiss TV as a member of the Ray Brown Trio. In 2000, he joined Ingrid Jensen on BET's Jazz Central Station. Keezer appeared on Japan's NHK in 2005 during their coverage of that year's Tokyo Jazz Festival. In 2012, Keezer played on ABC's Good Morning America and The View in a band with Chris Botti and country star Vince Gill.

== Teaching ==
Keezer is a jazz faculty member at the Juilliard School

He has taught master classes at the Brubeck Institute, the Royal Academy of Music, the Thelonious Monk Institute of Jazz, The New School, the Stanford Jazz Workshop, Indiana University, Michigan State University, Western Michigan University, the Jazzschool, Jazz Aspen, the Amsterdam College for the Arts, the Guildhall School of Music and The Hartt School of Music.

He also has five online courses with the online jazz lessons platform, Open Studio, "Open During Construction", "Jazz Piano Essentials", "Keez to Jazz Piano", "Advanced Jazz Piano Concepts", and "Elements of Solo Piano" .

== Discography ==
=== As leader/co-leader ===
Year recorded	Title	Label	Notes
1988	Waiting in the Wings	Sunnyside	With Bill Mobley (trumpet), Billy Pierce (soprano sax, tenor sax), Steve Nelson (vibraphone), Rufus Reid (bass), Tony Reedus (drums)
1989	Curveball	Sunnyside	With Steve Nelson (vibraphone), Charnett Moffett (bass), Victor Lewis (drums)
1990	Here & Now	Blue Note	With Donald Harrison (alto sax) Steve Nelson (vibraphone), Peter Washington (bass), Billy Higgins (drums)
1992	World Music	DIW	With James Genus (bass), Tony Reedus (drums), Rudy Bird (percussion)
1992	Other Spheres	DIW	With Bill Mobley (trumpet, flugelhorn), Billy Pierce (soprano sax, tenor sax), Bill Easley (alto sax, flute, clarinet, bass clarinet), Peter Bernstein (guitar), Steve Nelson (vibraphone, marimba), John Lockwood (bass), Leon Parker (drums), Rudy Bird (percussion), Jeanie Bryson (vocals)
1993	Trio	Sackville	Trio, with Steve Nelson (vibraphone), Neil Swainson (bass)
1995	For Phineas	Sackville	Duo, co-led with Harold Mabern (piano)
1996?	Turn Up the Quiet	Sony	with Joshua Redman (sax), Christian McBride (bass), Diana Krall (vocals)
1999?	Zero One	Dreyfus	Solo piano
2002	Sublime: Honoring the Music of Hank Jones	Telarc	Duo, with Kenny Barron, Chick Corea, Benny Green, Mulgrew Miller (piano; separately)
2002–03	Falling Up	Maxjazz	With various
2004	Wildcrafted: Live at the Dakota	Maxjazz	Trio, with Matt Clohesy (bass), Terreon Gully (drums); in concert
2005?	Free Association	ArtistShare	Duo, co-led with Jim Hall (guitar)
2006?	Live in Seattle	Origin	Quartet, with Joe Locke (vibraphone), Mike Pope (bass), Terreon Gully (drums)
2009?	Áurea	ArtistShare	Nominated for a 2009 Grammy award for "Best Latin Jazz Album"
2009?	The Near Forever		with Mary Ancheta
2011?	Mill Creek Road	SBE	with Peter Sprague (guitar), Hamilton Price, and Duncan Moore
2011?	Via	Origin	As Storms/Nocturnes; trio, with Tim Garland (sax), Joe Locke (vibraphone)
2012?	Signing	Motéma	With Joe Locke (vibraphone), Mike Pope (electric bass, acoustic bass), Terreon Gully (drums)
2013?	Heart of the Piano	Motéma	Solo piano
2018?	On My Way to You	MarKeez	Some tracks trio, with Mike Pope (bass), Lee Pearson (drums); some tracks quartet, with Gillian Margot (vocals) added
2023	Live at Birdland	MarKeez	Trio, with John Patitucci (bass), Clarence Penn (drums); in concert

=== As sideman ===
With Art Blakey

- Chippin' In (Timeless, 1990)
- One for All (A&M, 1990)

With Ray Brown

- Summertime: Ray Brown Trio with Ulf Wakenius (Telarc, 1997)
- Christmas Songs with The Ray Brown Trio (Telarc, 1999)
- Some of My Best Friends Are ... Piano Players (Telarc, 2000)
- Some of My Best Friends Are ... Trumpet Players (Telarc, 2000)
- Live At Starbucks (Telarc, 2001)
- Some of My Best Friends Are ... Singers (Telarc, 2002)
- Some of My Best Friends Are ... Guitarists (Telarc, 2002)
- Walk On: The Final Ray Brown Trio Recording, and Previously Unreleased Recordings (Telarc, 2003)

With Ronnie Cuber

- The Scene is Clean (Milestone 1993)
- Airplay (Steeplechase 1994)

With Art Farmer

- Soul Eyes (Enja, 1991)
- The Company I Keep (Arabesque, 1994) with Tom Harrell
- The Meaning of Art (Arabesque, 1995)
- Silk Road (Arabesque, 1997)

With Ricky Ford

- Hard Groovin' (Muse, 1989)

With Benny Golson

- Tenor Legacy (Arkadia Jazz, 1996 [1998])
- One Day, Forever (Arkadia Jazz, 1996 [2001])

With Roy Hargrove

- Diamond in the Rough (Novus/RCA, 1990)

With Christian McBride

- Vertical Vision (Warner Bros., 2002)

With Yasukatsu Oshima

- Yasukatsu Oshima with Geoffrey Keezer (Sony Japan, 2007)

With Yvonnick Prené

- Jobim's World (Sunnyside Records, 2024)
