= Flying Toward the Sound =

Studio album by Geri Allen
- Released: 2010
- Recorded: December 18–20, 2008; Klavierhaus, NYC
- Genre: Jazz
- Length: 60:06
- Label: Motéma MTM-37
- Producer: Geri Allen

Geri Allen chronology
Timeless Portraits and Dreams (2006)	Flying Toward the Sound (2010)	Geri Allen & Timeline Live (2009)

Flying Toward the Sound (subtitled A Solo Piano Excursion Inspired by Cecil Taylor, McCoy Tyner and Herbie Hancock) is a solo album by pianist Geri Allen recorded in 2008 and released on the Motéma label in 2010.

== Reception ==
Professional ratings
Review scores
Source	Rating
AllMusic	4.5/5 stars
The Guardian	3/5 stars
PopMatters	7/10 stars

AllMusic awarded the album 4 1/2 stars, stating, "Flying Toward the Sound is a major work for solo piano: courageous, vulnerable, poetically articulated, and technically awe-inspiring in form and execution". The Guardian review by John Fordham awarded the album 3 stars, noting, "It's a specialised homage to pianists and pianos, but this is the work of a formidable virtuoso". PopMatters reviewer Will Layman said, "I’d been thinking that Geri Allen had somehow gone flat in recent years, but I was wrong. She is just more catholic in the way she packages her intelligent, brave playing" JazzTimes stated, "the ghost of each pianist’s influence inhabits the "Refractions" suite... Nonetheless, every note of music is unmistakably Allen: clear, carefully plotted (even in the tangles of notes that shape the title track), and part of a larger soundscape that's as surreal as it is melodic". All About Jazz enthused, "Jazz has been quoted as being "music that walks a tightrope without a net." Allen's Flying Toward the Sound effectively fits that description—daring, vulnerable, and breathtaking".

== Track listing ==
All compositions by Geri Allen

1. "Refraction I: Flying Toward the Sound" - 6:02
2. "Refraction II: Red Velvet in Winter" - 5:56
3. "Refraction III: Dancing Mystic Poets at Midnight" - 4:20
4. "Refraction IV: God's Ancient Sky" - 16:03
5. "Refraction V: Dancing Mystic Poets at Twylight" - 3:22
6. "Refraction VI: Faith Carriers of Life" - 6:58
7. "Refraction VII: Dancing Mystic Poets at Dawn" - 5:43
8. "Refraction VIII: Flying Toward the Sound (Reprise)" - 6:53
9. "Your Pure Self (Mother to Son)" - 5:07
10. Video 1: "Flying Toward the Sound" - 4:08
11. Video 2: "Red Velvet in Winter" - 4:03
12. Video 3: "Faith Carriers of Life" - 4:40

== Personnel ==
- Geri Allen - piano
