= Sound Museum: Three Women =

Studio album by Ornette Coleman
- Released: July 1996
- Recorded: 1996
- Studio: Harmolodic Studios, Harlem, NYC
- Genre: Jazz
- Length: 55:15
- Label: Harmolodic/Verve
- Producer: Denardo Coleman

Ornette Coleman chronology
Sound Museum: Hidden Man (1996)	Sound Museum: Three Women (1996)	Sound Grammar (2006)

Sound Museum: Three Women is an album by the American jazz composer and saxophonist Ornette Coleman recorded in 1996 and released on the Harmolodic/Verve label. It is dedicated to Don Cherry and Ed Blackwell, longtime Coleman collaborators who died in 1995 and '92 respectively

The album is the companion to Sound Museum: Hidden Man. Both albums feature different interpretations of the same thirteen instrumental pieces, performed by the same quartet, plus a song with guest vocalists. Coleman wrote: "Sound Museum exists in two CD renditions of the same compositions played differently in each rendition. This concept was done to show music harmolodically. In the Harmolodic world the concept of space and time are not past or future but the present."

== Reception ==
Professional ratings
Review scores
Source	Rating
AllMusic	2.5/5 stars
Entertainment Weekly	A
Robert Christgau	(2-star Honorable Mention)
The Penguin Guide to Jazz Recordings	3/4 stars

The AllMusic review by Scott Yanow awarded the album 2½ stars, stating, "this is an excellent showcase for Ornette's searching and emotional (yet melodic) improvisations, one of the very few occasions since 1958 when he can be heard using a conventional three-piece rhythm section".

In an article for The New York Times, Jon Pareles called the two albums "affable, concise and playfully brilliant," and noted that they are the first Coleman albums in 35 years to include a piano. He stated: "Sound Museum provides a chance to hear the music as it might come out at two separate sets. The distinctions are in details: bowed bass (on 'Hidden Man') or pizzicato in 'Sound Museum,' a distinctly bluesier version of 'Mob Job' on 'Three Women.' 'Home Grown' uses a repeating riff that might have come from a swing band; on 'Hidden Man,' Allen grabs the same syncopation, while on 'Three Women' she plays all around the beat, like someone tossing a handful of marbles into the path of a pursuer." Pareles concluded: "the music never settles on a single mood. Even within a composition, there's always room for another angle. The music isn't a revolution any more; it's just good, smart fun."

Writing for Chicago Reader, Peter Margasak commented: "The acoustic group heard on Sound Museum... seems to understand that a silence can be as provocative as a piercing sax squeal... Coleman isn't introducing any radically new concepts or dabbling in new media here... rather, he's turned his energies back to innovations that largely had been absorbed into jazz's working vocabulary. What's most remarkable about Sound Museum is just how far Coleman can push those old concerns: they sound new all over again."

Jay Trachtenberg, in an article for The Austin Chronicle, remarked: "We are still hearing basically the same music that Coleman plays with electric abandon in his Prime Time band, but the piano-bass-drum accompaniment makes for a sound that is acoustically warmer and far less busy and cluttered... As for the two releases, unless you're a stone Coleman disciple who needs both, either disc will meet with your satisfaction... Either set... will have you dancing in your head."

== Track listing ==
All compositions by Ornette Coleman

1. "Sound Museum" – 4:54
2. "Monsieur Allard" – 2:47
3. "City Living" – 3:31
4. "What Reason" – 4:58
5. "Home Grown" – 3:24
6. "Stopwatch" – 2:31
7. "Don't You Know By Now" – 4:21
8. "P.P. (Picolo Pesos)" – 3:25
9. "Women of the Veil" – 4:49
10. "Yesterday, Today & Tomorrow" – 4:14
11. "Biosphere" – 4:23
12. "European Echoes" – 4:57
13. "Mob Job" – 4:21
14. "Macho Woman" – 2:40

- Recorded at Harmolodic Studios in Harlem, New York City in 1996

== Personnel ==
- Ornette Coleman – alto saxophone, trumpet, violin
- Geri Allen – piano
- Charnett Moffett – bass
- Denardo Coleman – drums
- Lauren Kinhan, Chris Walker – vocals
