= Maroons (album) =

Studio album by Geri Allen
- Released: October 1992
- Recorded: February 11–14, 1992
- Studio: Sound On Sound Studio, NYC
- Genre: Jazz
- Length: 71:59
- Label: Blue Note CDP 7 99493 2 8
- Producer: Geri Allen

Geri Allen chronology
Live at the Village Vanguard (1990)	Maroons (1992)	Twenty One (1994)

Maroons is an album by pianist Geri Allen, recorded in 1992 and released on the Blue Note label.

== Reception ==
Professional ratings
Review scores
Source	Rating
AllMusic	4.5/5 stars

AllMusic awarded the album 4½ stars, stating, "This excellent recording is easily recommended to her fans and potential new devotees".

In an article for JazzTimes, Michael J. West praised "Number Four", writing that Allen "anticipates Belgrave's every melodic and rhythmic move—at times sticking-and-moving, a la Earl Hines with Armstrong. She picks up his pathways on her solo... but turns them in her own direction, as if his improvised figures were the written material on which she was improvising. It's a remarkable achievement, one deserving of close attention within her catalogue."

== Track listing ==
All compositions by Geri Allen except as indicated

1. "Feed the Fire I" - 1:33
2. "No More Mr. Nice Guy" - 7:05
3. "And They Partied" - 5:29
4. "Number Four" (Lawrence Williams) - 4:35
5. "A Prayer for Peace" - 5:43
6. "Mad Money" - 7:39
7. "Two Brothers" (Anthony Cox, Dwayne Dolphin) - 2:49
8. "Feed the Fire II" - 3:29
9. "Dolphy's Dance" - 5:01
10. "For John Malachi" - 4:09
11. "Laila's House" - 8:21
12. "Feed the Fire III" - 3:16
13. "Brooklyn Bound 'A'" - 1:05
14. "Bed-Sty" - 5:19
15. "Maroons" - 6:26

== Personnel ==
- Geri Allen - piano
- Marcus Belgrave, Wallace Roney - trumpet
- Anthony Cox, Dwayne Dolphin - bass
- Pheeroan akLaff, Tani Tabbal - drums
