= Segments (album) =

Studio album by Geri Allen, Charlie Haden & Paul Motian
- Released: December 1989
- Recorded: April 6–8, 1989
- Studio: Sound Ideas Studios, NYC
- Genre: Jazz
- Length: 51:05
- Label: DIW DIW-833
- Producer: Kazunori Sugiyama

Geri Allen chronology
| In the Year of the Dragon (1989) | Segments (1989) | The Nurturer (1990) |

Segments is a jazz album by pianist Geri Allen, bassist Charlie Haden and drummer Paul Motian recorded in 1989 and released on the Japanese DIW label.

== Reception ==
Professional ratings
Review scores
| Source | Rating |
|---|---|
| AllMusic | 3.5/5 stars |
| The Penguin Guide to Jazz | 3/4 stars |

AllMusic awarded the album 4 stars, stating, "At the time, the trio performed and recorded frequently, and the collaborative energy they shared is palpable on this album". The Penguin Guide to Jazz praised the contribution of all members of the trio, and added that "Allen can't entirely claim ownership".

== Track listing ==
All compositions by Paul Motian except as indicated

1. "Law Years" (Ornette Coleman) – 5:46
2. "You'll Never Know" (Harry Warren) – 5:00
3. "Marmaduke" (Charlie Parker) – 4:42
4. "Cabala/Drum Music" – 7:39
5. "Home" – 1:30
6. "I'm All Smiles" (Michael Leonard) – 6:02
7. "Segment" (Parker) – 4:26
8. "La Pasionara" (Charlie Haden) – 9:25
9. "Rain" (Geri Allen) – 3:35

== Personnel ==
- Geri Allen – piano
- Charlie Haden – bass
- Paul Motian – drums
