= Geri Allen =

American jazz musician and educator (1957–2017)

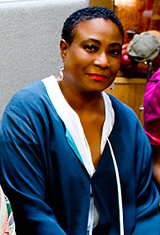
- Allen in 2008
- Born: June 12, 1957; Pontiac, Michigan, U.S.
- Died: June 27, 2017 (aged 60); Philadelphia, Pennsylvania, U.S.
- Education: Howard University; University of Pittsburgh
- Spouse: Steve Coleman (m. 1987; div. 1989) Wallace Roney (m. 1995; div. 2008)
- Children: Three
- Musical career
- Genres: Jazz, blues, funk, gospel
- Occupations: Musician, educator, composer
- Instrument: Piano
- Years active: 1982–2017
- Labels: Motema Music, Polygram, Storyville, Blue Note, Telarc
- Website: www.GeriAllen.com

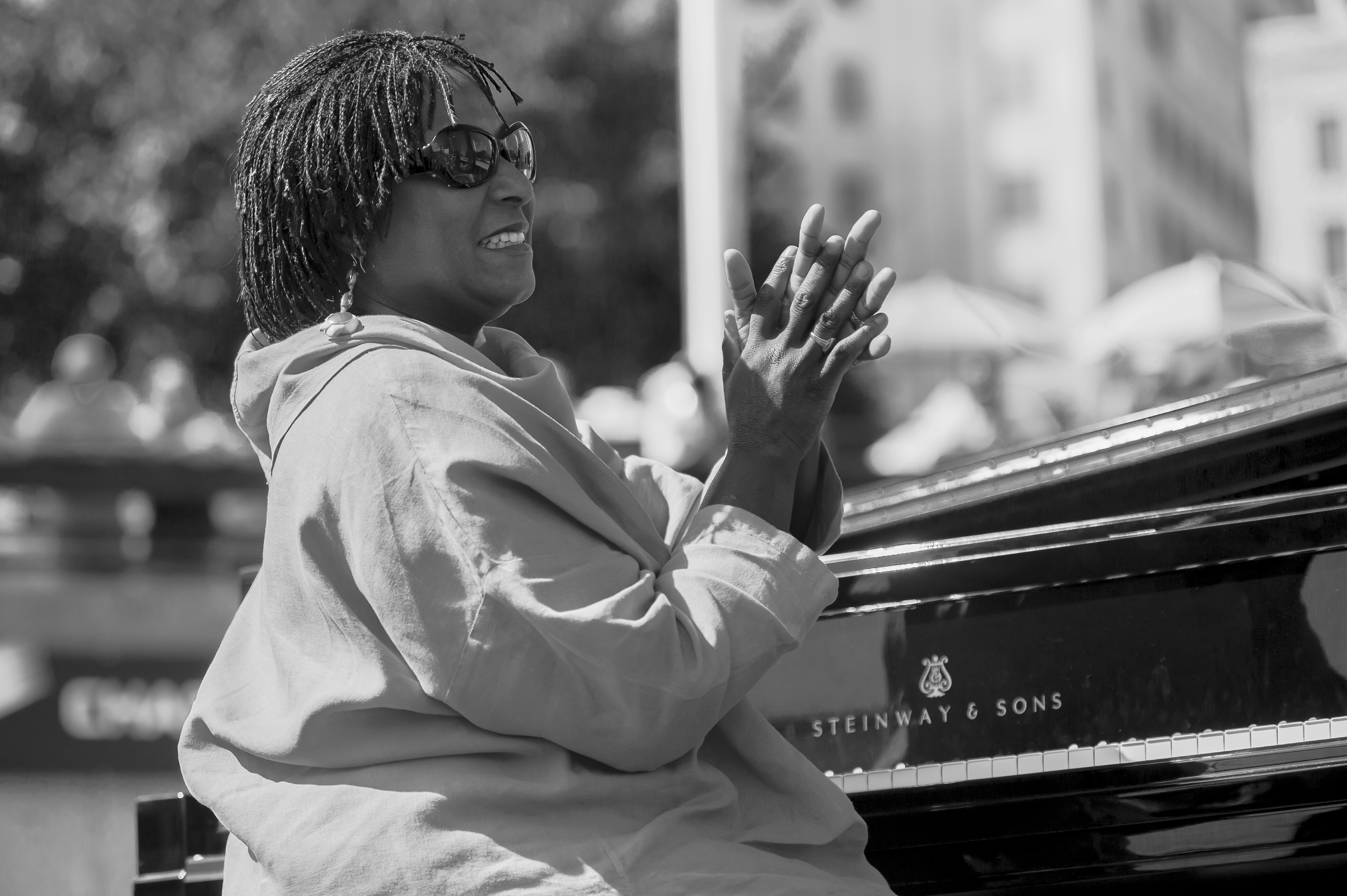
Allen at Detroit Jazz Fest in 2009

Geri Antoinette Allen (June 12, 1957 – June 27, 2017) was an American jazz pianist, composer, and educator. She taught at the University of Michigan and the University of Pittsburgh.

== Early life and education ==
Allen was born in Pontiac, Michigan, on June 12, 1957, and grew up in Detroit. "Her father, Mount Allen Jr, was a school principal, her mother, Barbara, a government administrator in the defence industry." Allen was educated in Detroit Public Schools. She started playing the piano at the age of seven, and settled on becoming a jazz pianist in her early teens.

Allen graduated from Howard University's jazz studies program in 1979. She then continued her studies: with pianist Kenny Barron in New York; and at the University of Pittsburgh, where she completed a master's degree in ethnomusicology in 1982. After this, she returned to New York.

== Career ==
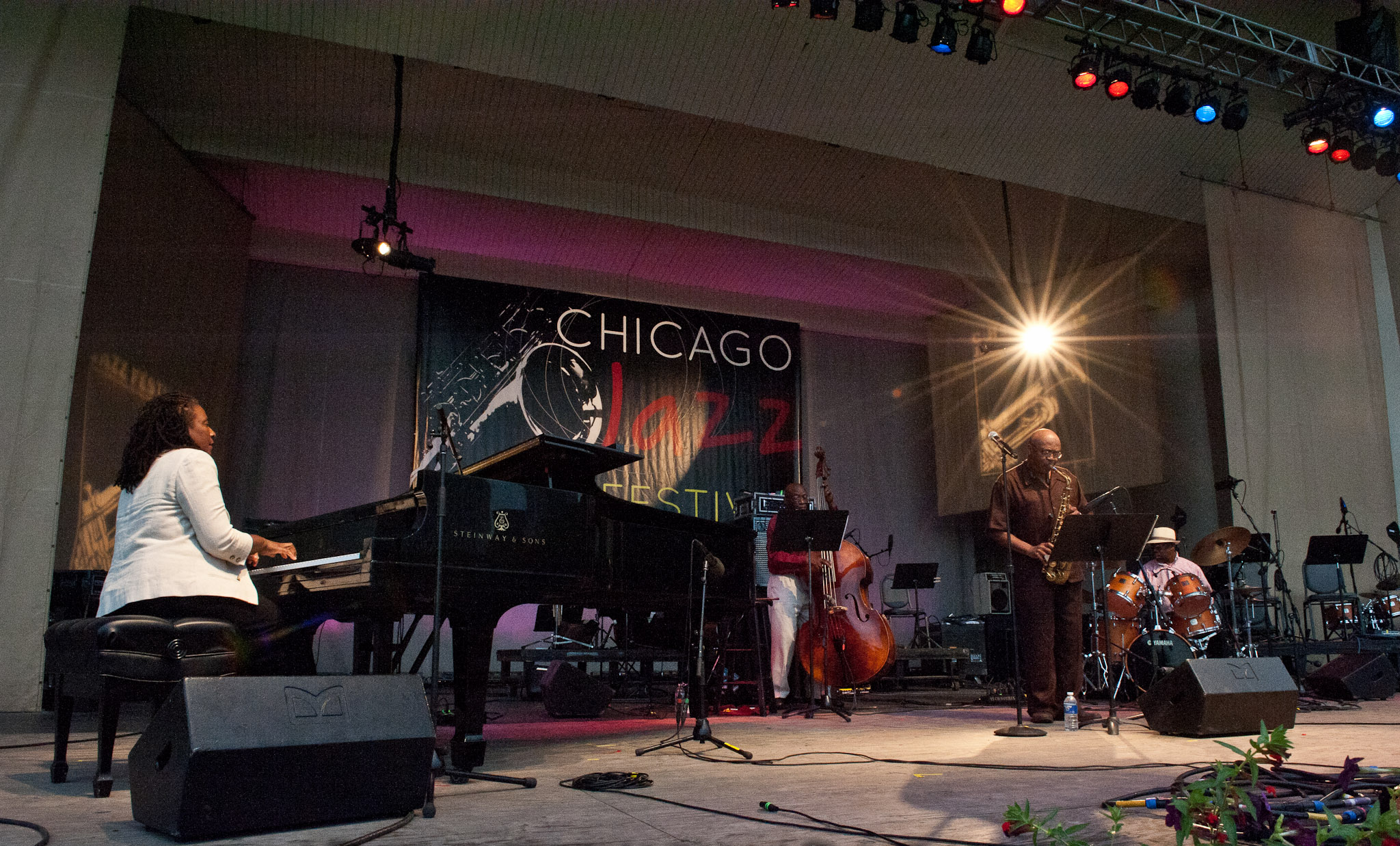
Allen with Trio 3 in 2011

Allen became involved in the M-Base collective in New York. Her recording debut as a leader was in 1984, resulting in The Printmakers. This trio album, with bassist Anthony Cox and drummer Andrew Cyrille, also featured some of Allen's compositions. Allen was awarded the Jazzpar Prize in 1996. In the same year, she recorded two albums with Ornette Coleman: Sound Museum: Hidden Man and Sound Museum: Three Women.

In 2006, Allen composed "For the Healing of the Nations", a suite written in tribute to the victims and survivors of the September 11 attacks. She was awarded a Guggenheim Fellowship in 2008. Allen was a longtime resident of Montclair, New Jersey. For 10 years she taught jazz and improvisational studies at the University of Michigan, and she became director of the jazz studies program at the University of Pittsburgh in 2013. Allen spent the last few years before her death performing with renowned pianist McCoy Tyner and was also a part of two trio groups: ACS and the Mac Power Trio. Allen also served as the program director of NJPAC's All-Female Jazz Residency, which off weeklong studies of jazz to younger women (ages 14-25).

== Personal life ==
Allen married trumpeter Wallace Roney in 1995. They had a daughter and a son; the marriage ended in divorce.

=== Death ===
Allen died on June 27, 2017, two weeks after her 60th birthday, in Philadelphia, Pennsylvania, after suffering from cancer.

== Accolades ==
- DownBeat Jazz Hall of Fame, 2022
- Honorary Doctorate of Music from Berklee, 2014
- Guggenheim Fellowship, 2008
- African American Classical Music Award from Spelman College, 2007
- The Benny Golson Jazz Master Award, 2005
- Distinguished Alumni Award from Howard, 1996
- Danish Jazzpar Prize (first woman and youngest recipient), 1996
- Soul Train's Lady of Soul Award (first recipient) for jazz album of the year for Twenty-One, 1995

== Discography ==
=== As leader/co-leader ===
Main sources:

| Recording date | Title | Label | Year released | Personnel/Notes |
|---|---|---|---|---|
| 1984–02 | The Printmakers | Minor Music | 1985 | Trio, with Anthony Cox (bass), Andrew Cyrille (drums, percussion) |
| 1985–01 | Home Grown | Minor Music | 1985 | Solo piano |
| 1986–12 | Open on All Sides in the Middle | Minor Music | 1987 | With Rayse Biggs (trumpet, flugelhorn), Robin Eubanks (trombone), David McMurray (soprano sax, flute), Steve Coleman (alto sax), Jaribu Shahid (bass), Tani Tabbal (drums), Shahita Nurallah (vocals); plus guests Mino Cinelu (drums, percussion), Lloyd Storey (tap dance), Marcus Belgrave (flugelhorn) |
| 1989 | Twylight | Minor Music | 1989 | Trio, with Jaribu Shahid (bass), Tani Tabbal (drums), plus Sadiq Bey (congas, percussion), Eli Fountain (percussion) as guests, and Clarice Taylor Bell (vocals) on one track |
| 1989–03 | In the Year of the Dragon | JMT | 1989 | Trio, with Charlie Haden (bass), Paul Motian (drums); one track quartet, with Juan Lazaro Mendolas (flute) added |
| 1989–04 | Segments | DIW | 1989 | Trio, with Charlie Haden (bass), Paul Motian (drums) |
| 1990–01 | The Nurturer | Blue Note | 1991 | Sextet, with Marcus Belgrave (trumpet, flugelhorn), Kenny Garrett (alto sax), Robert Hurst (bass), Jeff "Tain" Watts (drums), Eli Fountain (percussion) |
| 1990–12 | Live at the Village Vanguard | DIW | 1991 | Trio, with Charlie Haden (bass), Paul Motian (drums); in concert |
| 1990–12 | Live at the Village Vanguard: Unissued Tracks | Somethin' Cool | 2022 | Trio, with Charlie Haden (bass), Paul Motian (drums); in concert. Posthumous release. |
| 1992–02 | Maroons | Blue Note | 1992 | With Marcus Belgrave and Wallace Roney (trumpet), Anthony Cox and Dwayne Dolphin (bass), Pheeroan akLaff and Tani Tabbal (drums) in various combinations |
| 1994–03 | Twenty One | Blue Note | 1994 | Trio, with Ron Carter (bass), Tony Williams (drums) |
| 1995–12, 1996-03 | Eyes in the Back of Your Head | Blue Note | 1997 | Some tracks solo piano/synthesizer; some duos with Ornette Coleman (alto sax), Wallace Roney (trumpet) and Cyro Baptista (percussion); some trio tracks, with Roney (trumpet) and Baptista (percussion) |
| 1996–03 | Some Aspects of Water | Storyville | 1997 | With Henrik Bolberg Pedersen (trumpet, flugelhorn), Johnny Coles (flugelhorn), Kjeld Ipsen (trombone), Axel Windfeld (tuba), Michael Hove (alto sax, flute, clarinet), Uffe Markussen (tenor sax, soprano sax, bass clarinet), Palle Danielsson (bass), Lenny White (drums) |
| 1998–02 | The Gathering | Verve | 1998 | With Wallace Roney (trumpet, flugelhorn), Robin Eubanks (trombone), Dwight Andrews (piccolo, alto flute, bass flute, bass clarinet), Vernon Reid (guitar), Ralphe Armstrong (7-stringbass), Buster Williams (bass), Lenny White (drums), Mino Cinelu (percussion) in various combinations |
| 2004–01 | The Life of a Song | Telarc | 2004 | Trio, with Dave Holland (bass), Jack DeJohnette (drums); one track sextet, with Marcus Belgrave (flugelhorn), Dwight Andrews (sax), Clifton Anderson (trombone) added |
| 2006–03 | Timeless Portraits and Dreams | Telarc | 2006 | Trio, with Ron Carter (bass), Jimmy Cobb (drums); some tracks solo piano; some tracks with Wallace Roney (trumpet), Donald Walden (tenor sax), Carmen Lundy, George Shirley and The Atlanta Jazz Chorus (vocals) added in various combinations |
| 2008–12 | Flying Toward the Sound | Motéma | 2010 | Solo piano |
| 2009–02 | Geri Allen & Timeline Live | Motéma | 2010 | Quartet, with Kenny Davis (bass), Kassa Overall (drums), Maurice Chestnut (tap dance) |
| 2011–01, 2011-04 | A Child Is Born | Motéma | 2011 | Solo keyboards; some tracks with Carolyn Brewer, Connaitre Miller, Barbara Roney and Farah Jasmine Griffin (vocals) added in various combinations |
| 2012–08 | Grand River Crossings | Motéma | 2013 | Solo piano; some tracks duo, with Marcus Belgrave (trumpet); one track duo with David McMurray (alto sax) |
| 2012–09 | A Lovesome Thing | Motéma · Heartcore | 2023 | Duo, with Kurt Rosenwinkel (guitar). Posthumous release. |
| 2015–06 | Perfection | Motéma | 2016 | Trio, with David Murray (tenor sax, bass clarinet), Terri Lyne Carrington (drums); one track sextet, with Wallace Roney (trumpet), Craig Harris (trombone), Charnett Moffett (bass) added |

=== As a member ===
General Music Project (G. M. Project)
(Co-led by Kenny Garrett and Charnett Moffett)

- General Music Project (Sweet Basil/Apollon, 1994)

The Mary Lou Williams Collective

- Zodiac Suite: Revisited (Mary, 2006)

=== As sidewoman ===
Main source:

With Franco Ambrosetti

- Movies (Enja, 1987) – rec. 1986
- Movies Too (Enja, 1988)

With Betty Carter

- Droppin' Things (Verve, 1990) – live
- Feed the Fire (Verve, 1994) – live rec. 1983
- The Music Never Stops (Blue Engine, 2019) – live

With Ornette Coleman

- Sound Museum: Hidden Man (Harmolodic/Verve, 1996)
- Sound Museum: Three Women (Harmolodic/Verve, 1996)

With Steve Coleman

- Group, Motherland Pulse (JMT, 1985)
- And Five Elements, On the Edge of Tomorrow (JMT, 1986)
- And Five Elements, World Expansion (JMT, 1986)
- And Five Elements, Sine Die (Pangaea, 1986) – 1 track

With Charlie Haden

- 1987: Etudes (Soul Note, 1988)
- 1989: The Montreal Tapes: with Geri Allen and Paul Motian (Verve, 1997)
- 1989: The Montreal Tapes: Liberation Music Orchestra (Verve, 1999)

With Oliver Lake

- Expandable Language (Black Saint, 1984)
- Otherside (Gramavision, 1988)
- Talkin' Stick (Passin' Thru, 2000)

With Charles Lloyd

- Lift Every Voice (ECM, 2002)
- Jumping the Creek (ECM, 2005) – rec. 2004

With Greg Osby

- Mindgames (JMT, 1988)
- 3-D Lifestyles (Blue Note, 1993)

With Wallace Roney

- Munchin' (Muse, 1993)
- Crunchin' (Muse, 1993)
- Mistérios (Warner Bros., 1994)
- Village (Warner Bros, 1997)
- No Room for Argument (Stretch, 2000)
- Prototype (HighNote, 2004)
- Mystikal (HighNote, 2005)
- Jazz (Highnote, 2007)

With Trio 3
(Oliver Lake, Reggie Workman and Andrew Cyrille)

- At This Time (Intakt, 2009)
- Celebrating Mary Lou Williams–Live at Birdland New York (Intakt, 2011)

With others

- The Batson Brothers, Three Pianos for Jimi (Douglas, 1998)
- Cecil Brooks III, The Collective (Muse, 1989)
- Roy Brooks, Duet in Detroit (Enja, 1993)
- Buddy Collette, Flute Talk with James Newton (Soul Note, 1988)
- Craig Handy, Reflections in Change (Sirocco Music, 1999)
- Joseph Jarman, Inheritance (FourStar, 1991)
- Frank Lowe, Decision in Paradise (Soul Note, 1984)
- Paul Motian, Monk in Motian (JMT, 1988)
- Dewey Redman, Living on the Edge (Black Saint, 1989)
- Gregory Charles Royal, Dream Come True (GCR, 1979)
- Woody Shaw, Bemsha Swing (Blue Note, 1997)
- John Stubblefield, Bushman Song (Enja, 1986)
- Wayne Shorter, Joy Ryder (Columbia, 1988)
- Gary Thomas, By Any Means Necessary (JMT, 1989)
- Ernie Watts, Unity (JVC, 1995)
- Buster Williams, Houdini (Sirocco Music, 2001)
- Reggie Workman, Cerebral Caverns (Postcards, 1995)
- V.A., Kansas City (A Robert Altman Film, Original Motion Picture Soundtrack) (Verve, 1996)

== Filmography ==
Geri Allen portrays jazz pianist Mary Lou Williams and performs with the jazz band in the Robert Altman film Kansas City.

== See also ==
- List of jazz pianists
- The Detroit Experiment
