= Twylight =

Studio album by Geri Allen
- Released: October 1989
- Recorded: 1989
- Studio: Sound Ideas Studios (New York City, New York)
- Genre: Jazz
- Length: 45:20
- Label: Minor Music MM 1014
- Producer: Geri Allen

Geri Allen chronology
Open on All Sides in the Middle (1986)	Twylight (1989)	In the Year of the Dragon (1989)

Twylight is an album by pianist Geri Allen recorded in early 1989 and released on the German Minor Music label.

== Reception ==
Professional ratings
Review scores
Source	Rating
AllMusic	4/5 stars

AllMusic awarded the album 4 stars stating "This is a stunningly beautiful recording, marking a distinct progression for Allen, and her complete awareness of the world at large. It might take several listenings to get used to, but the ultimate reward of this high artistic achievement is limitless."

Pianist and composer Ethan Iverson wrote "the compositional integrity is striking," and commented: "Twylight has a concentrated offering of Allen's odd meter vamps that feel old and fresh at the same time. Over those vamps, Allen plays pretty chords, bluesy melodies, or jagged shapes. Everyone does this today, but at the time it was rousing call to arms."

== Track listing ==
All compositions by Geri Allen

1. "When Kabuya Dances" – 8:42
2. "Shadow Series" – 6:06
3. "Skin" – 1:43
4. "A Place of Power" – 4:10
5. "Twylight" – 1:11
6. "Stop the World" – 4:06
7. "Wood" – 2:36
8. "Little Wind" – 4:22
9. "Dream Time" – 3:44
10. "Blue" – 4:11
11. "Black Pools" – 4:29

== Personnel ==
- Geri Allen – acoustic piano, synthesizers (2, 4–8, 11)
- Jaribu Shahid – acoustic bass (1–4, 6–9, 11)
- Tani Tabbal – drums (1, 3, 6–9, 11), djembe (6)

Special guests

- Rory Young – synthesizer programming
- Sadiq Bey – congas (1, 9), percussion (4, 7, 8, 11)
- Eli Fountain – percussion (7, 8, 11)
- Clarice Taylor – vocals (2, 11)

=== Production ===
- Stephan Meyner – executive producer
- Geri Allen – producer
- Joe Rosenberg – engineer
- Peter Denenberg – mixing at Acme Recording Studio (Mamaroneck, New York)
- MICHA – art direction
- Jules Allen – photography
- Marguerite E. Green – image consultant
- Knule Mwanga – management
