= The Printmakers =

Studio album by Geri Allen
- Released: 1985
- Recorded: February 8–9, 1984
- Studio: Tonstudio Zuckerfabrik, Stuttgart, West Germany
- Genre: Jazz
- Length: 41:03
- Label: Minor Music MM 001
- Producer: Stephan Meyner

Geri Allen chronology
The Printmakers (1985)	Home Grown (1985)

The Printmakers is the first album by the pianist Geri Allen. It was recorded in February 1984 in Germany and released on the German Minor Music label.

== Reception ==
Professional ratings
Review scores
Source	Rating
AllMusic	4.5/5 stars
The Encyclopedia of Popular Music	3/5 stars
The Penguin Guide to Jazz Recordings	3/4 stars

AllMusic awarded the album 4½ stars, stating: "This session will prove to be an ear-opening experience for those familiar with Geri Allen's more mainstream work." NPR called the album "a tight, imaginative trio session." The New York Times wrote that Allen's "ballads demonstrate a rich, coloristic sense of harmony, and she can hurtle through atonal passages with steel-fingered momentum."

== Track listing ==
All compositions by Geri Allen

1. "A Celebration of All Life" - 6:20
2. "Eric" - 5:29
3. "Running as Fast as You Can...TGTH" - 3:10
4. "M's Heart" - 4:52
5. "Printmakers" - 8:05
6. "Andrew" - 4:24
7. "When Kabuya Dances" - 6:48
8. "D and V" - 1:55

== Personnel ==
- Geri Allen - piano
- Anthony Cox - double bass
- Andrew Cyrille - drums, mouth percussion, timpani
