= David Monette =

American craftsman

David G. Monette (born 1956, Kalamazoo, Michigan) is an American craftsman who designs and builds custom brass instruments and mouthpieces for musicians.

Monette's experience as a trumpeter and the influence of acoustician Arthur Benade led Monette to redesign the trumpet mouthpiece with the goal of improving playability and sound quality. Since the first mouthpieces reached the market in 1985, Monette has made mouthpieces for tuba, trombone, B♭, C, D, E♭ trumpet, and A and B♭ piccolo trumpet.

He has designed mouthpieces and trumpets for Dr. George Washington Shaw, Maynard Ferguson, Wynton Marsalis and Charles Schlueter, as well as tubist Chester Schmitz. Monette designed the Flumpet, a combination of a trumpet and flugelhorn, for jazz musicians Art Farmer and Mark Isham.

Monette designed his first trumpet in 1983. A perfectionist, he has said that his vision is to create a trumpet with the "perfect sound", which, according to Monette, is a sound that "gets out of the way" of the connection between a musician and an audience.

== See also ==
- Air Jordan XX. Monette is credited with influencing the laser-etched design of the sneaker
