= Marcus Belgrave =

American jazz trumpet player (1936–2015)

Background information
- Born: Marcus Batista Belgrave; June 12, 1936; Chester, Pennsylvania, United States
- Origin: Detroit, Michigan, United States
- Died: May 23, 2015 (aged 78) Ann Arbor, Michigan, United States
- Genres: Jazz
- Occupation: Musician
- Instrument: Trumpet
- Label: Detroit jazz musicians co-op
- Website: marcusbelgrave.com

Marcus Batista Belgrave (June 12, 1936 – May 23, 2015) was an American jazz trumpet player from Detroit, born in Chester, Pennsylvania. He recorded with numerous musicians from the 1950s onwards. Belgrave was inducted into the class of 2017 of the National Rhythm & Blues Hall of Fame in Detroit, Michigan.

== Biography ==
Belgrave was tutored by Clifford Brown before joining the Ray Charles touring band. Belgrave later worked with Motown Records, and recorded with Martha Reeves and the Vandellas, The Temptations, The Four Tops, Gunther Schuller, Carl Craig, Max Roach, Ella Fitzgerald, Charles Mingus, Tony Bennett, La Palabra, Sammy Davis Jr., Dizzy Gillespie, Odessa Harris and John Sinclair, plus more recently with his wife Joan Belgrave, among others.

Belgrave was an occasional faculty member at Stanford Jazz Workshop and a visiting professor of jazz trumpet at the Oberlin Conservatory.

Belgrave died on May 23, 2015, in Ann Arbor, Michigan, of heart failure, after being hospitalized since April with complications of chronic obstructive pulmonary disease and congestive heart failure.

== Discography ==
=== As leader ===
- Gemini II (Tribe Records, 1974; reissued Universal Sound, 2004).
- Working together (Detroit Jazz), 1992 (featuring Lawrence Williams)
- Live at Kerrytown Concert House (Detroit Jazz), 1995
- In the tradition (GHB) (featuring Doc Cheatham and Art Hodes)
- You don't know me – Tribute to New Orleans, Ray Charles and the Great Ladies of Song (DJMC), 2006 (featuring Joan Belgrave & Charlie Gabriel)
- Marcus, Charlie and Joan...Once again (DJMC), 2008

=== As sideman ===
With Roland Alexander

- Pleasure Bent (New Jazz, 1961)

With Geri Allen

- Open on All Sides in the Middle (Minor Music, 1987)
- The Nurturer (Blue Note, 1991)
- Maroons (Blue Note, 1992)
- The Life of a Song (Telarc, 2004)
- Grand River Crossings (Motéma, 2013)

With Curtis Amy

- Way Down (Pacific Jazz, 1962)

With Joan Belgrave

- Excitable (Detroit Jazz Musicians Co-Op, 2009)
- Merry Christmas Baby (Detroit Jazz Musicians Co-Op, 2014)

With Hank Crawford

- Dig These Blues (Atlantic, 1966)

With George Gruntz

- Theatre (ECM, 1983)

With Joe Henderson

- Big Band (Verve, 1997)

With B.B. King

- Let the Good Times Roll (1999)

With Kirk Lightsey

- Kirk 'n Marcus (Criss Cross Jazz, 1987)
- Lightsey to Gladden (Criss Cross Jazz 1306,1991)

With David Murray

- Black & Black (1991)

With David "Fathead" Newman

- Fathead (album) (Atlantic, 1960)
- Fathead Comes On (Atlantic, 1962)
- Resurgence! (Muse, 1981)

With Cecil Payne

- Scotch and Milk (Delmark, 1997)

With Houston Person

- The Real Thing (Eastbound, 1973)

With Horace Tapscott

- Aiee! The Phantom (Arabesque, 1996)

With McCoy Tyner

- La Leyenda de La Hora (Columbia, 1985)

With Wynton Marsalis and Jazz at Lincoln Center Orchestra

- They Came To Swing (live) (Sony, 1994)
