= Carmen Lundy =

American jazz singer (born 1954)

- Born: Carmen Latretta Lundy; November 1, 1954 (age 71); Miami, Florida, U.S.
- Genres: Jazz, vocal jazz
- Occupations: Singer, musician, composer, arranger
- Instruments: Vocals, piano, guitar
- Years active: 1978–present
- Labels: Justin Time, Arabesque, JVC, Afrasia
- Website: www.carmenlundy.com

Carmen Latretta Lundy (born November 1, 1954) is an American jazz singer. She has been performing for over four decades, with a focus on original material.

She has been positively compared with Aretha Franklin, Ella Fitzgerald and Sarah Vaughan. Lundy is also the sister of bassist Curtis Lundy.

Lundy's albums Modern Ancestors (2021) and Fade to Black (2022) were nominated for the Grammy Award for Best Jazz Vocal Album.

== Biography ==
Lundy has composed and published over forty songs. Her compositions have been recorded by such artists as Kenny Barron ("Quiet Times"), Ernie Watts ("At the End of My Rope"), and Straight Ahead ("Never Gonna Let You Go").

Lundy's first album, Good Morning Kiss (1985) featured several original compositions, and was reissued in 2002. Her second album was Night and Day (1987), and featured musicians Kenny Kirkland (piano), Alex Blake (bass), Curtis Lundy (bass), Victor Lewis (drums), Rodney Jones (guitar), Ricky Ford (tenor sax).

The John F. Kennedy Center for the Performing Arts website has called Carmen Lundy "a woman of many faces: composer, arranger, producer, actress, painter, and sophisticated vocalist well known for her progressive bop and post-bop stylings—an uncompromising jazz singer whose every note is bulls-eye accurate" (Los Angeles Times). "Equally adept at love-struck ballads, songs of heartbreak, or full-out swing, Lundy wields a voice of agility and seductive allure [that] make for a potent combination."

In 2005, Lundy and producer Elisabeth Oei launched the label Afrasia Productions with Jazz & the New Songbook: Live at the Madrid recorded live at the Madrid Theatre in Los Angeles, also released on DVD. Lundy draws on repertoire from her previous recordings, backed by brother Curtis Lundy and Victor Lewis, pianists Billy Childs, Robert Glasper, Bobby Watson, Phil Upchurch, and Mayra Casales, a percussionist, who also released on Afroasia (the only one beside Lundy so far.) The label's second release was Come Home, her tenth album, featuring Geri Allen and Steve Turre, followed by Solamente, an album with recordings that originally served as reference demos, where she was playing all instruments herself. Lundy's latest release via Afrasia Productions was released on Feb 17, 2017, and features several guest artists, notably Patrice Rushen on piano.

Lundy's oil-on-canvas paintings have been exhibited in New York at The Jazz Gallery (Soho) and in Los Angeles at the Jazz Bakery and the Madrid Theatre. Her artwork also appears in the booklets that accompany her CDs.

== Discography ==
Year	Title	Label
1986	Good Morning Kiss	Blackhawk; Justin Time, 2002
1987	Night and Day	CBS/Sony (Japan); Afrasia, 2011
1992	Moment to Moment	Arabesque Jazz; Afrasia, 2007
1995	Self Portrait	JVC
1997	Old Devil Moon	JVC
2001	This is Carmen Lundy	Justin Time
2003	Something to Believe In	Justin Time
2005	Jazz and the New Songbook: Live at the Madrid	Afrasia Productions
2007	Come Home	Afrasia Productions
2009	Solamente	Afrasia Productions
2012	Changes	Afrasia Productions
2014	Soul to Soul	Afrasia Productions
2017	Code Noir	Afrasia Productions
2019	Modern Ancestors	Afrasia Productions
2020	Jazz Deluxe	Bundlebeats
2022	Fade to Black	Afrasia Productions

With Geri Allen

- Timeless Portraits and Dreams (Telarc, 2006)

With Walter Bishop Jr.

- Cubicle (Muse, 1978)

With Curtis Lundy

- Just Be Yourself (New Note, 1987)
- Against All Odds (Justin Time, 1999)
