= Flumpet =

Hybrid musical instrument

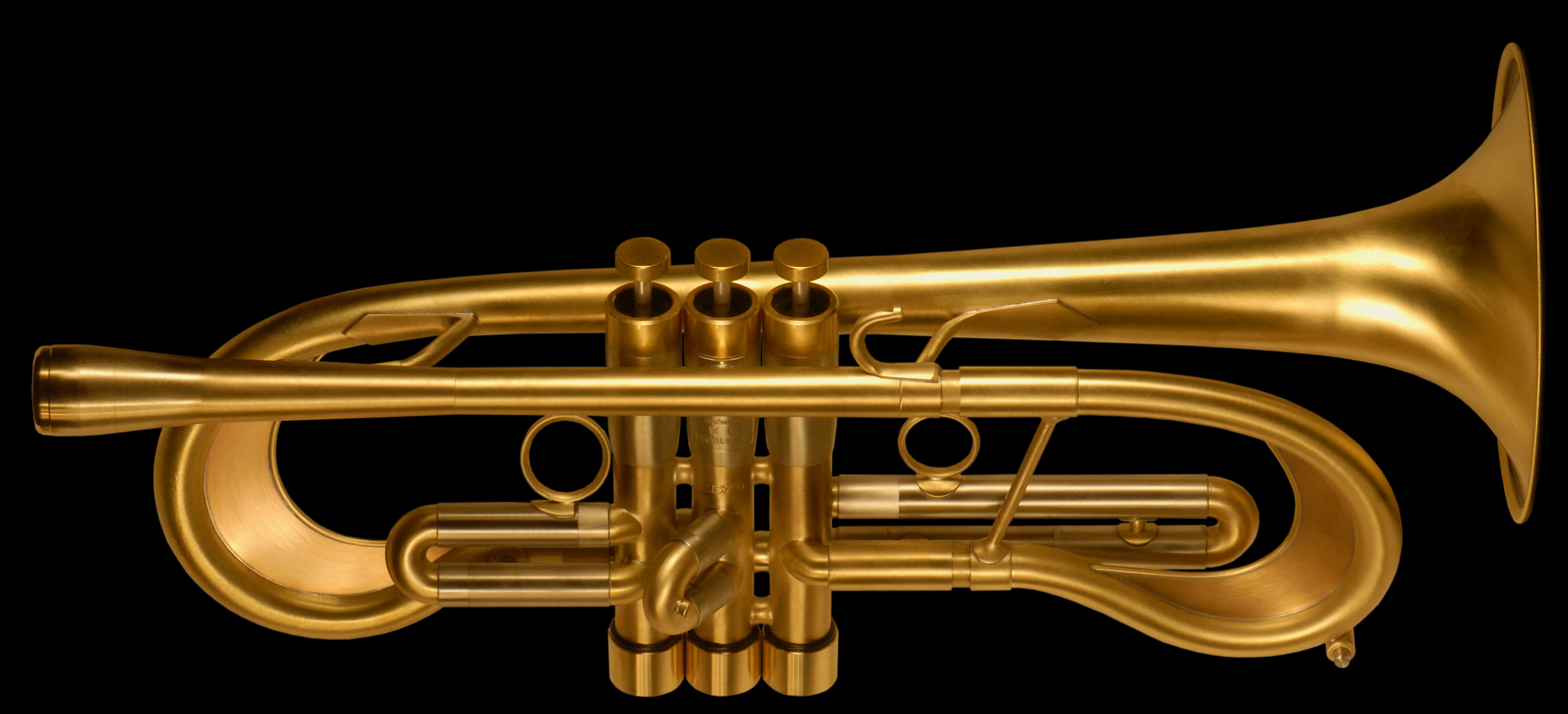
- Raja Flumpet, B♭

Brass instrument
- Classification: Brass: Wind; Brass; Aerophone
- Inventor(s): Art Farmer, David Monette
- Developed: David Monette

Playing range
- Written range

Related instruments
- Trumpet, flugelhorn, cornet

Musicians
- Art Farmer, Mark Isham, Charles Schlueter

The Flumpet is a hybrid brass instrument that shares the construction and timbral qualities of a trumpet and flugelhorn. The Flumpet was invented for Art Farmer by David Monette and is currently in production by Monette. The Flumpet is in the key of B♭.

== Design ==
The Flumpet was designed in 1989 and borrows the three piston valve design of both the trumpet and flugelhorn and shares the same instrument length of a trumpet. The curves on the end of the Flumpet have a resemblance to shepherd's crooks. The mouthpiece is deeply conical which tapers slightly, as opposed to the trumpet mouthpiece which has an extreme taper to create a bowl shape. The sound of the Flumpet is described as thicker and richer than a flugelhorn and more mellow and rounded than that of a trumpet. During its creation, instrument maker David Monette wanted to produce an instrument that broke design barriers but ultimately maintained its usefulness.

The Flumpet has been described as "capable of both warmth and sharp attack", taking advantage of the softer sound produced by the flugelhorn, advantageous in smaller and more intimate venues, whilst still being capable of producing the more familiar harder tones of a trumpet. The tone has been described as having "characteristics of a flugelhorn, but not nearly as brittle. It has the response of a cornet, but again the sound quality is broader and more resonant."

== Notable players ==
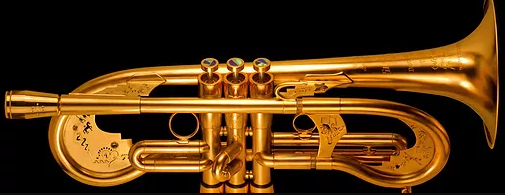
Art Farmer's decorated Flumpet

- Art Farmer
- Flea
- Nathan Halford
- Charles Schlueter
- Scotty Barnhart
- Vince Jones

== Recordings and performances ==
Made popular by Art Farmer, the Flumpet can be heard on several of his recordings from the 1990s, including Soul Eyes, The Company I Keep, The Meaning of Art, and Silk Road. Farmer also used the instrument for 1994 live performances of Haydn's trumpet concerto with the Austrian-Hungarian Haydn Philharmonic Orchestra.

At a 1997 performance by Boston Symphony Orchestra, Charles Schlueter played the Flumpet in place of the post-horn solo of Mahler's Symphony No. 3.

Film composer and musician Mark Isham played Flumpet on the soundtrack for the 1997 film Afterglow.

Flea played Flumpet on the cover of "Wichita Lineman" included in his 2026 album Honora.
