= The Nurturer =

Studio album by Geri Allen
- Released: February 1991
- Recorded: January 5–6, 1990
- Studio: Sound On Sound Studio, NYC
- Genre: Jazz
- Length: 52:56
- Label: Blue Note CDP 7 95139 2
- Producer: Geri Allen

Geri Allen chronology
Segments (1989)	The Nurturer (1991)	Live at the Village Vanguard (1990)

The Nurturer is an album by pianist Geri Allen recorded in 1990 and released on the Blue Note label.

== Reception ==
Professional ratings
Review scores
Source	Rating
AllMusic	4.5/5 stars
The Penguin Guide to Jazz	3.5/4 stars
Downbeat	4/5 stars

AllMusic's Scott Yanow awarded the album 4½ stars, calling it "A fine example of Geri Allen's advanced music (which holds on to tradition without merely recreating the past)".

The authors of the Penguin Guide to Jazz Recordings wrote: "With The Nurturer, Allen develops her interest in structures, the shape and resonance of compositions, as opposed to straightforward soloing on themes. The arrangements are watertight and quite ambitious... Strongly recommended."

Josef Woodard, writing for Downbeat, gave The Nurturer 4 stars. Woodard wrote, "Allen's own solos typically manage an adept balancing act: eloquence and self-examination. The combination is a rare one, and the mark of an artist tethered to her own sense of rhyme and reason—and no one else's".

== Track listing ==
All compositions by Geri Allen except as indicated

1. "Night's Shadow" (Eli Fountain) - 8:26
2. "No. 3" (Lawrence Williams) - 8:17
3. "It's Good To Be Home Again" (Williams) - 4:32
4. "Batista's Groove" (Marcus Belgrave) - 5:24
5. "Night of Power (For My Daughter Laila)" - 2:19
6. "Our Gang" (Robert Hurst) - 5:38
7. "Silence and Song/The Nurturer" - 9:51
8. "Le Goo Wop" - 1:48
9. "Lullaby of Isfahn" (Kenny Garrett) - 6:41

== Personnel ==
- Geri Allen - piano
- Marcus Belgrave - trumpet, flugelhorn
- Kenny Garrett - alto saxophone
- Robert Hurst - bass
- Jeff "Tain" Watts - drums
- Eli Fountain - percussion
