= Open on All Sides in the Middle =

Studio album by Geri Allen
- Released: December 1987
- Recorded: December 1986
- Studio: The Sound Suite (Detroit, Michigan)
- Genre: Jazz
- Length: 43:47
- Label: Minor Music MM 1013
- Producer: Geri Allen

Geri Allen chronology
Home Grown (1985)	Open on All Sides in the Middle (1987)	Twylight (1989)

Open on All Sides in the Middle is an album by pianist Geri Allen, recorded in late 1986 and released on the German Minor Music label.

== Reception ==
Professional ratings
Review scores
Source	Rating
AllMusic	3/5 stars
The Penguin Guide to Jazz	2/4 stars

AllMusic reviewer Scott Yanow stated that "the material is comparatively lightweight for a Geri Allen recording, often only bordering on jazz". The Penguin Guide to Jazz described the album as an attempt to create "some new kind of song-based jazz", but labelled it "dire".

== Track listing ==
All compositions by Geri Allen

1. "Open on All Sides / The Glide Was in the Ride..." - 6:45
2. "Forbidden Place" - 4:24
3. "The Dancer" - 2:33
4. "In the Middle" - 4:01
5. "Ray" - 4:17
6. "I Sang a Bright Green Tear for All of Us This Year..." - 12:46
7. "Drummer's Song" - 2:24
8. "In the Morning" - 5:03
9. "The Dancer Part 2" - 1:34

== Personnel ==
- Geri Allen – acoustic piano, keyboards, backing vocals
- Jaribu Shahid – acoustic bass
- Tani Tabbal – drums
- Steve Coleman – alto saxophone, horn arrangements (4)
- Dave McMurray – soprano saxophone, flute
- Robin Eubanks – trombone
- Rayse Biggs – trumpet, flugelhorn
- Shahida Nurullah – lead vocals

Special guests

- Mino Cinelu – electronic drums, cymbals, bells, congas, timbales, udu, percussion
- Marcus Belgrave – flugelhorn (8)
- Lloyd Storey – tap dance

Production

- Stephan Meyner – executive producer
- Geri Allen – producer, arrangements
- Steve Coleman – co-producer
- Mino Cinelu – associate producer
- Dave McMurray – associate producer
- Mike Brown – recording
- Peter Denenberg – mixing at Acme Recording Studio (Mamaroneck, New York)
- Claus Bäurele – cover design
- Christin Schindler – cover design
- Jules Allen – photography
- Earla Diange – hair
- Ruberto – jewelry
