= Perfection (album) =

Studio album by David Murray, Geri Allen, and Terri Lyne Carrington
- Released: 2016
- Recorded: June 18–19, 2015
- Studios: Avatar (New York, New York)
- Genre: Jazz
- Length: 57:41
- Labels: Motéma Music; 234221
- Producers: Terri Lyne Carrington, David Murray, Geri Allen

David Murray chronology
Blues for Memo (2016)	Perfection (2016)	Seriana Promethea (2022)

Geri Allen chronology
Grand River Crossings (2013)	Perfection (2016)	Live at the Village Vanguard: Unissued Tracks (2022)

Perfection is an album by the Murray, Allen & Carrington Power Trio, featuring saxophonist David Murray, pianist Geri Allen, and drummer Terri Lyne Carrington. It was recorded at Avatar Studios in New York City in June 2015, and was released by Motéma Music in 2016. Guest musicians Wallace Roney (trumpet), Craig Harris (trombone), and Charnett Moffett (bass) appear on one track.

The album was recorded shortly after the death of Ornette Coleman, whose previously unrecorded composition "Perfection" forms the centerpiece of the disc. According to Murray, he received the lead sheet for the piece from trumpeter Bobby Bradford, who had copied it out. Referring to Coleman, the musicians wrote: "There are certain extraordinary musicians upon whose shoulders we stand, both because their work of the highest musical standard and because of their ability to teach and inspire is exceptional, encouraging all of us to seek our own excellence and be the best we can be in order to put our feet in the groundwork which they laid."

The remaining tracks are originals by members of the group, with the exception of "Barbara Allen", a traditional ballad that Geri Allen loved upon first hearing it played by bassist Charlie Haden, before she knew its title was her mother's name. Carrington's "Samsara (For Wayne)" is dedicated to Wayne Shorter, while the title of Allen's "For Fr. Peter O'Brien" refers to the Catholic priest who was Mary Lou Williams' manager.

Regarding the unusual trio format of saxophone, piano, and drums, the musicians wrote that it "challenges each of us to engage ourselves differently than we have done in other groups or musical formats."

Perfection was Geri Allen's final release before her death in 2017.

== Reception ==
Professional ratings
Review scores
Source	Rating
DownBeat	4.5/5 stars
The Guardian	3/5 stars

In a review for DownBeat, James Hale wrote: "The bass-free configuration works well, with Carrington's particularly resonant bass drum filling the role usually played by a string instrument."

Writing for The New York Times, Nate Chinen stated: "Dynamic combustion is the core characteristic of this all-star trio... Across the board, the performances are thrilling and taut." In a separate NYT article, Chinen commented: "Stout in its purpose, ringing with expedition, it's a statement of tribute to the avant-garde hero Ornette Coleman, but also a straightforward celebration of the bonds between these players."

Michael J. West of Jazz Times remarked: "As great as saxophonist David Murray, pianist Geri Allen and drummer Terri Lyne Carrington are separately, it’s truly difficult to remember the last time any of them sounded as good as they all do together on Perfection. The members of the jazz 'power trio' share a chemistry that gives their music remarkable strength."

The Guardian's John Fordham praised the title track, stating that "Carrington and Moffett perfectly catch the airborne groove of a classic Coleman rhythm section."

In an article for NPR, Kevin Whitehead wrote: "A band without a bass gives the pianist and drummer more room to maneuver and dip into the low frequencies, and it lets Geri Allen and Terri Carrington play more duets. Their interplay is crisp, and it's a joy just to hear the drummer play time. It's a great setting for both these jazz women."

Writing for Stereophile, Fred Kaplan commented: "This is very much an equilateral triangle of musicians... and each brings distinctive flavors to the mix... I saw this trio play at New York's Winter Jazz Festival in 2015 and have hoped ever since that they'd make an album that lived up to the excitement of that concert. This one does."

Patrick Hadfield of London Jazz News praised the album's "consistent tone, centred on the excellence of the trio," and stated: "Perfection might not be perfect, but it is hard to fault."

Chris Baber of Jazz Views wrote that the album "doesn't disappoint," and noted: "we have three musicians at the peak of their talents, stretching their playing in the open structure of the bass-less trio... Each piece is developed with post-bop experimentalism but always with tremendous poise and balance in their playing."

The Denver Post's Bret Saunders stated that Perfection "is everything superior jazz should be: exciting, heartfelt, inventive... this is one release whose title is not hyperbole."

== Track listing ==
1. "Mirror of Youth" (David Murray) – 5:52
2. "Barbara Allen" (Traditional, arranged by Geri Allen) – 5:59
3. "Geri-Rigged" (Terri Lyne Carrington) – 6:11
4. "The David, Geri & Terri Show" (David Murray) – 8:16
5. "The Nurturer" (Geri Allen) – 4:43
6. "Perfection" (Ornette Coleman, arranged by David Murray) – 6:06
7. "D Special (Interlude)" (Terri Lyne Carrington) – 2:55
8. "Samsara (For Wayne)" (Terri Lyne Carrington) – 5:44
9. "For Fr. Peter O'Brien" (Geri Allen) – 5:35
10. "Cycles and Seasons" (David Murray) – 6:21

== Personnel ==
- David Murray – tenor saxophone, bass clarinet
- Geri Allen – piano
- Terri Lyne Carrington – drums
- Wallace Roney – trumpet (track 6)
- Craig Harris – trombone (track 6)
- Charnett Moffett – bass (track 6)
