= Grand River Crossings =

Studio album by Geri Allen
- Released: September 10, 2013
- Recorded: August 23 & 24, 2012; Klavierhaus, NYC
- Genre: Jazz
- Length: 60:06
- Label: Motéma MTM-128
- Producer: Geri Allen & Kunle Mwanga

Geri Allen chronology
A Child is Born (2011)	Grand River Crossings (2013)	Perfection (2016)

Grand River Crossings (subtitled Motown & Motor City Inspirations) is an album of songs associated with or inspired by Detroit and Motown by pianist Geri Allen recorded in 2012 and released on the Motéma label in 2013.

== Reception ==
Professional ratings
Review scores
Source	Rating
Allmusic	4.5/5 stars
All About Jazz	3/5 stars
The Guardian	3/5 stars
The Irish Times	3/5 stars

Allmusic awarded the album 4½ stars, stating, "Of her 19 offerings, Grand River Crossings is certainly her most personal. It's also among her very best". The Guardian review by John Fordham awarded the album 3 stars, noting, "There's a tentativeness to some of this music, but Allen's mix of intelligence, spontaneity and precision nonetheless put her in a very special league". Cormac Larkin of The Irish Times commented "...the real interest on Grand River Crossings is in hearing player of the calibre and creativity of Allen jamming quietly on some of the tunes which formed her musical mind."

== Track listing ==
All compositions by Geri Allen except as indicated

1. "Wanna Be Startin' Somethin'" (Michael Jackson) - 2:21
2. "Tears of a Clown" (Stevie Wonder, Hank Cosby, Smokey Robinson) - 5:31
3. "That Girl" (Stevie Wonder) - 6:05
4. "Grand River Crossings I" - 0:48
5. "The Smart Set" (Roy Brooks) - 2:54
6. "Let It Be" (John Lennon, Paul McCartney) - 3:58
7. "Space Odyssey" (Marcus Belgrave) - 5:36
8. "In Appreciation" - 1:04
9. "Baby I Need Your Loving" (Eddie Holland, Lamont Dozier, Brian Holland) - 4:29
10. "Itching in My Heart" (Holland, Dozier, Holland) - 1:56
11. "Stoned Love" (Kenny Thomas, Frank Wilson) - 3:40
12. "Grand River Crossings II" - 0:52
13. "Inner City Blues" (Marvin Gaye, James Nyx Jr.) - 4:26
14. "Save the Children" (Al Cleveland, Renaldo Benson, Marvin Gaye) - 7:15
15. "Nancy Joe" (Gerald Wilson) - 3:39

== Personnel ==
- Geri Allen - piano
- Marcus Belgrave - trumpet (tracks 5, 7 & 14)
- David McMurray - alto saxophone (track 10)
