= Twenty One (Geri Allen album) =

Studio album by Geri Allen
- Released: November 1994
- Recorded: March 23–24, 1994
- Studio: Manhattan Center Studios, NYC
- Genre: Jazz
- Length: 54:18
- Label: Blue Note CDP 8 30028
- Producer: Herb Jordan, Teo Macero

Geri Allen chronology
Maroons (1992)	Twenty One (1994)	Eyes in the Back of Your Head (1996)

Twenty One is an album by pianist Geri Allen with bassist Ron Carter and drummer Tony Williams, recorded in 1994 and released on the Blue Note label. The title of the album refers to the commitment Allen made at age 21 to continue and extend the tradition of the jazz masters.

== Reception ==
Professional ratings
Review scores
Source	Rating
AllMusic	3.5/5 stars

AllMusic awarded the album 3½ stars, stating, "Allen's style is fairly original, with hints of Herbie Nichols, and her chancetaking but logical solos are generally quite stimulating".

Writer Gary Giddins called the album "a display of strength" and "a mature work by a performer... who was repositioning herself as a jazz centrist." He commented: "This is a trio fearsomely alive... The triumph of Twenty One is in the certainty with which Allen's individuality asserts itself in a setting that might have neutralized her."

== Track listing ==
All compositions by Geri Allen except as indicated

1. "RTG" - 2:46
2. "If I Should Lose You" (Ralph Rainger, Leo Robin) - 4:36
3. "Drummer's Song" - 3:52
4. "Introspection/Thelonious" (Thelonious Monk) - 4:36
5. "A Beautiful Friendship" (Donald Kahn, Stanley Styne) - 3:23
6. "In the Morning" - 6:10
7. "Tea for Two" (Irving Caesar, Vincent Youmans) - 3:18
8. "Lullaby of the Leaves" (Bernice Petkere, Joe Young) - 5:15
9. "Feed the Fire" - 6:17
10. "Old Folks" (Dedette Lee Hill, Willard Robison) - 6:18
11. "A Place of Power" - 3:16
12. "In the Middle" - 4:25

== Personnel ==
- Geri Allen – piano
- Ron Carter – bass
- Tony Williams – drums
