= Live at the Village Vanguard (Geri Allen album) =

1991 live instrumental album

Live album by Geri Allen, Charlie Haden & Paul Motian
- Released: May 1991
- Recorded: December 21–22, 1990
- Venue: Village Vanguard, NYC
- Genre: Jazz
- Length: 46:25
- Label: DIW DIW-847
- Producer: Geri Allen, Charlie Haden, Paul Motian & Kazunori Sugiyama

Geri Allen chronology
The Nurturer (1990)	Live at the Village Vanguard (1991)	Maroons (1991)

Charlie Haden chronology
Dream Keeper (1990)	Live at the Village Vanguard (1991)	First Song (1992)

Live at the Village Vanguard is a live album by pianist Geri Allen, bassist Charlie Haden and drummer Paul Motian. It was recorded in 1990 at the Village Vanguard and released on the Japanese DIW label.

== Reception ==
Professional ratings
Review scores
Source	Rating
AllMusic	4/5 stars
The Penguin Guide to Jazz	4/4 stars

AllMusic awarded the album 4 stars, stating, "Live at the Village Vanguard is a good CD musically, but there's not much jump-up factor here -- it's moody and very bluesy in feeling if not actual form, almost like chamber jazz at times. The very compressed, muted recorded sound doesn't alleviate the somber aspect of the listening experience any, but jazz is about capturing the moment. And those were the moments, emotional and musical, caught by these three master musicians on those two December nights".

The authors of the Penguin Guide to Jazz Recordings awarded the album 4 stars, and wrote: "Live is both accessible and inexhaustible, making its appeal at all sorts of unexpected levels... Even allowing for the head start of Keith Jarrett's 'Standards' trio, this is probably the best piano-led group currently working."

== Track listing ==
All compositions by Geri Allen except as indicated

1. "A Prayer for Peace" – 6:32
2. "Obtuse Angles" – 6:07
3. "It Should Have Happened a Long Time Ago" (Paul Motian) – 7:11
4. "For Turiya" (Charlie Haden) – 1:01
5. "Fiasco" (Motian) – 8:23
6. "In the Year of the Dragon" (Motian) – 7:41
7. "Vanguard Blues" (Haden) – 7:43
8. "Mumbo Jumbo" (Motian) – 9:28
9. "Song for the Whales" (Haden) – 7:59

== Personnel ==
- Geri Allen – piano
- Charlie Haden – bass
- Paul Motian – drums
