= In the Year of the Dragon =

Studio album by Geri Allen, Charlie Haden & Paul Motian
- Released: 1989
- Recorded: March 1989
- Studio: Sound Ideas Studios, NYC
- Genre: Avant-garde jazz, post-bop, progressive jazz
- Length: 43:53
- Label: JMT 834 428-2
- Producer: Stefan Winter

Geri Allen chronology
Twylight (1989)	In the Year of the Dragon (1989)	Segments (1989)

In the Year of the Dragon is an album by pianist Geri Allen, bassist Charlie Haden and drummer Paul Motian recorded in 1989 and released on the German JMT label.

== Reception ==
Professional ratings
Review scores
Source	Rating
AllMusic	4/5 stars
The Penguin Guide to Jazz	3/4 stars

AllMusic awarded the album 4 stars, stating, "Fully realized, diverse, and balanced, this piano-bass-drums trio recording is one of the very best of its late-'80s era, loaded with great musicianship, surprises, and an accurate representation of these genius musicians' personalities and individualism blended into a complete whole. In the Year of the Dragon is highly recommended to all who appreciate superb musicianship coming together". The Penguin Guide to Jazz awarded it 3 stars, calling it "one of the best of the trio sets".

== Track listing ==
All compositions by Geri Allen except as indicated

1. "Oblivion" (Bud Powell) - 3:17
2. "For John Malachi" – 3:30
3. "Rollano" (Juan Lazaro Mendolas) - 4:10
4. "See You at Per Tutti's" (Charlie Haden) - 5:55
5. "Last Call" (Paul Motian) - 5:10
6. "No More Mr. Nice Guy" – 7:01
7. "Invisible" (Ornette Coleman) - 4:34
8. "First Song" (Haden) - 5:38
9. "In the Year of the Dragon" (Motian) - 7:55

== Personnel ==
- Geri Allen - piano
- Charlie Haden - bass
- Paul Motian - drums
- Juan Lazaro Mendolas - flute (track 3)
