= Just Be Yourself (album) =

Studio album by Curtis Lundy
- Released: 1987
- Recorded: 1985
- Studio: Van Gelder Studio, Englewood Cliffs, New Jersey
- Genre: Jazz
- Length: 38:41
- Label: New Note; NN1003
- Producer: Curtis Lundy, Kenny Washington

Curtis Lundy chronology
Beatitudes (1983)	Just Be Yourself (1987)	Against All Odds (1999)

Just Be Yourself is an album by double bassist Curtis Lundy. It was recorded during 1985 at Van Gelder Studio in Englewood Cliffs, New Jersey, and was released on vinyl in 1987 by New Note Records. In 1997, the album was reissued on CD by Evidence Music. On the album, Lundy is joined by saxophonist Bobby Watson, vibraphonist Steve Nelson, pianist Hank Jones, drummer Kenny Washington, and vocalist Carmen Lundy.

== Reception ==
Professional ratings
Review scores
Source	Rating
AllMusic	4/5 stars
MusicHound Jazz	4/5 stars
The Penguin Guide to Jazz Recordings	3/4 stars

In a review for AllMusic, Scott Yanow wrote: "Although the bassist is the leader, he does not take much more solo space than if he had been a sideman... The personnel differs from track to track but the music is consistently rewarding. This obscurity is worth acquiring by modern straight-ahead jazz collectors."

Sunsh Stein of JazzTimes stated that, on the album, Lundy "demonstrates his talents as a soloist, an ensemble player and vocal accompanist," and noted that the group "handles everything with the aplomb of seasoned experts and the excitement of musicians doing what they love to do."

== Track listing ==
1. "Jabbo's Revenge" (Curtis Lundy) – 5:39
2. "Silver's Serenade" (Horace Silver) – 4:12
3. "Funny (Not Much)" (Bob Merrill, Hughie Prince, Marcia Neil, Philip Broughton) – 3:45
4. "Crossroads" (Bobby Watson) – 4:35
5. "Never Gonna Let You Go" (Carmen Lundy) – 4:20
6. "Just Be Yourself" (Steve Nelson) – 4:28
7. "Bolando" (Bobby Watson) – 7:57
8. "Shaw 'Nuff" (Charlie Parker) – 3:56

== Personnel ==
- Curtis Lundy – double bass
- Bobby Watson – alto saxophone
- Steve Nelson – vibraphone
- Hank Jones – piano
- Kenny Washington – drums
- Carmen Lundy – vocals (tracks 3 and 5)
