= Home Grown (Geri Allen album) =

Studio album by Geri Allen
- Released: 1985
- Recorded: January 1985
- Studio: Tonstudio Bauer, Ludwigsburg, West Germany
- Genre: Jazz
- Label: Minor Music MM 004
- Producer: Stephan Meyner

Geri Allen chronology
The Printmakers (1984)	Home Grown (1985)	Open on All Sides in the Middle (1986)

Home Grown is an album by pianist Geri Allen recorded in West Germany in early 1985 and released on the German Minor Music label.

== Reception ==
Professional ratings
Review scores
Source	Rating
AllMusic	3/5 stars

AllMusic awarded the album 3 stars calling it "A fine early set".

A writer for Billboard stated: "Solo set for this adventurous pianist showcases her mercurial style as both composer and player, characterized by an interplay of staccato single note fragments and dense chordal work... For the adventurous."

Vijay Iyer recalled playing the album for Jason Moran, who had never heard it before, in late 1999. According to Iyer, Moran was "floored," and immediately asked to borrow it.

== Track listing ==
All compositions by Geri Allen except as indicated

1. "Mama's Babies" - 5:31
2. "Bemsha Swing" (Denzil Best, Thelonious Monk) - 2:50
3. "No More Mr. Nice Guy" - 8:31
4. "First Black Man ... M.O.P.E." - 3:59
5. "'Round Midnight" (Monk) - 6:09
6. "Blue" - 3:17
7. "Alone Together" - 7:34
8. "Home Grown" - 5:23

== Personnel ==
- Geri Allen - piano
