= The Gathering (Geri Allen album) =

Studio album by Geri Allen
- Released: August 18, 1998
- Recorded: February 19–21 & 25, 1998
- Studios: Sorcerer Sound, NYC
- Genre: Jazz
- Length: 61:04
- Label: Verve 314 557 614-2
- Producer: Teo Macero

Geri Allen chronology
Eyes in the Back of Your Head (1997)	The Gathering (1998)	The Life of a Song (2004)

The Gathering is an album by the pianist Geri Allen, recorded in 1998 and released on the Verve label.

== Reception ==
Professional ratings
Review scores
Source	Rating
AllMusic	4/5 stars
Stereo & Video	4/5 stars

AllMusic stated: "As complete and realized as many of Allen's recordings are, this one displays all of her immense powers coming to light at the same time. It's immaculately programmed, perfectly executed music that has a haunting quality overall, but enough punch, innovation, and style to rank it highly among her best projects, and comes highly recommended". JazzTimes stated: "As opportunities increase and as her experience in the music broadens, it becomes all the more clear that Geri Allen is one of our most richly talented jazz musicians. For her first Verve session, Ms. Allen's compositional focus is keen and clear, very reflective and at times quite introspective".

== Track listing ==
1. "The Gathering" - 5:22
2. "Dark Prince" - 5:47
3. "Sleepin' Pretty" - 6:48
4. "Light Matter" - 6:56
5. "Baby's Breath (For Little Barbara)" - 1:13
6. "Ray" - 5:22
7. "Soul Beir" - 6:02
8. "Joy and Wonder" - 4:40
9. "Gabriel's Royal Blue Reals" - 6:31
10. "Daybreak and Dreams" - 5:41
11. "Angels" - 6:42

== Personnel ==
- Geri Allen - piano
- Wallace Roney - trumpet, flugelhorn
- Robin Eubanks - trombone
- Dwight Andrews - piccolo, alto flute, bass flute, bass clarinet
- Vernon Reid - electric guitar, acoustic guitar
- Ralphe Armstrong - 7-string bass
- Buster Williams - bass
- Lenny White - drums
- Mino Cinelu - percussion
