= Live at Starbucks =

Live album by Ray Brown
- Released: 2001
- Length: 60:10

Professional ratings
Review scores
Source	Rating
AllMusic	3/5 stars
The Penguin Guide to Jazz Recordings	3.5/4 stars

Live at Starbucks is an album by Ray Brown.

== Track listing ==
1. "Up There" – 4:02
2. "When I Fall in Love" – 7:09
3. "Brown Bossa" – 3:53
4. "Our Delight" – 4:20
5. "Lament" – 8:10
6. "Mainstem" – 3:53
7. "Love You Madly" – 2:33
8. "Caravan" – 5:29
9. "This House Is Empty/I Should Care" – 7:19
10. "Lester Leaps In" – 4:46
11. "Starbuck's Blues" – 8:36

== Personnel ==
- Ray Brown – double bass, arranger, producer
- Geoffrey Keezer – piano
- Karriem Riggins – drums

== Production ==
- Will Friedwald – liner notes
