= Against All Odds (Curtis Lundy album) =

Studio album by Curtis Lundy
- Released: 1999
- Recorded: April 1 and 2, 1999
- Studio: Sound on Sound Studios, New York City
- Genre: Jazz
- Length: 1:02:24
- Label: Justin Time; JUST 129-2

Curtis Lundy chronology
Just Be Yourself (1987)	Against All Odds (1999)	Purpose (2002)

Against All Odds is an album by double bassist Curtis Lundy. It was recorded on April 1 and 2, 1999, at Sound on Sound Studios in New York City, and was released later that year by Justin Time Records. On the album, Lundy is joined by saxophonists Bobby Watson and Shelley Carrol, trumpeters Peven Everett and Roy Hargrove, pianists John Hicks and Anthony Wonsey, drummer Winard Harper, and vocalist Carmen Lundy.

== Reception ==
Professional ratings
Review scores
Source	Rating
AllMusic	4/5 stars
The Penguin Guide to Jazz Recordings	3.5/4 stars

In a review for AllMusic, Michael G. Nastos wrote: "There are many jazz bassists that swing, have rock-solid deep blue tones, and know their tradition forwards and backwards, but few quite like Curtis Lundy... As a complete musical statement, this goes quite far in clearly defining what Lundy's all about. Other recordings... gave more than a hint, but this very fine CD rams the point home. Curtis Lundy, Top 10 bassist, period. Recommended."

Nate Guidry of JazzTimes stated that the album "should swing the Miami native out of obscurity," and commented: "What piques the interest throughout is the interplay between Lundy and his rhythm section... The recording... brings musicians together in compelling configurations... Each combination swings with stylistic cohesiveness."

== Track listing ==
1. "Player's Anthem" (Curtis Lundy) – 6:17
2. "Do I Ever Cross Your Mind?" (Shelley Carrol) – 7:02
3. "A Long Journey" (Carmen Lundy) – 7:06
4. "Groydology" (Peven Everett) – 11:51
5. "Teardrops" (Curtis Lundy) – 5:40
6. "Where'd It Go?" (Carmen Lundy) – 5:29
7. "Sweet Audrey" (Shelley Carrol) – 4:37
8. "Blue Woman" (Carmen Lundy) – 6:11
9. "All Things Being Equal Are Not" (Onaje Allan Gumbs) – 7:41

== Personnel ==
- Curtis Lundy – double bass
- Bobby Watson – alto saxophone
- Shelley Carrol – tenor saxophone
- Peven Everett – trumpet
- Roy Hargrove – trumpet, flute, flugelhorn
- John Hicks – piano
- Anthony Wonsey – piano
- Winard Harper – drums
- Carmen Lundy – vocals
