= Josh Langhoff =

American stadium organist

Josh Langhoff is a musician known for his music writing and for being the stadium organist for the Chicago Cubs at Wrigley Field.

== Early life ==
Langhoff grew up in Warrenton, Missouri where he was a National Merit Scholar. His father, Donald Langhoff, was a Lutheran pastor. He took organ classes as a music major at Christ College at Valparaiso University. While there he hosted a radio show and showed movies on campus. He graduated with a music degree in 1999.

== Career ==
Langhoff became interested in writing and both Christian music and regional music, specifically Mexican music, while he was in college. He began working at Wrigley Field after a long audition process in March 2020 and, because of COVID-19, was playing to an empty stadium. He shares the role with organist John Benedeck. He also is the music director at St. James the Less Episcopal Church in Northfield, Illinois.

Langhoff also works as a freelance writer, writing for outlets such at Pitchfork, Pop Matters, and the Village Voice. He has presented six times at the MoPOP Pop Conference on either faith-based or regional Mexican music.
