= Ah-Leu-Cha =

Composition by Charlie Parker All-Stars
- Written: 1948
- Genre: Jazz
- Composer: Charlie Parker

"Ah-Leu-Cha" is a bebop composition written in 1948 by American jazz saxophonist Charlie Parker. It is a contrafact of "Honeysuckle Rose" in the "A" section and "I Got Rhythm" in the "B" section. "Ah-Leu-Cha" was originally recorded by Charlie Parker All-Stars on September 18, 1948, in New York City for Savoy Records.

The composition has been performed and recorded by numerous artists, including notable recordings by Dizzy Gillespie, Miles Davis, Archie Shepp, and Art Farmer.
