= The Life of a Song (Geri Allen album) =

Studio album by Geri Allen
- Released: August 24, 2004
- Recorded: January 16–17, 2004
- Studio: Avatar Studio C, New York City
- Genre: Jazz
- Length: 65:23
- Label: Telarc CD-83598
- Producer: Elaine Martone & Geri Allen

Geri Allen chronology
The Gathering (1998)	The Life of a Song (2004)	Timeless Portraits and Dreams (2006)

The Life of a Song is an album by pianist Geri Allen, recorded in 2004 and released on the Telarc label.

The album reunited Allen with drummer Jack DeJohnette and bassist Dave Holland; they had previously performed together on vocalist Betty Carter's live 1993 album, Feed the Fire.

== Reception ==
Professional ratings
Review scores
Source	Rating
AllMusic	4/5 stars
The Penguin Guide to Jazz	4/4 stars

AllMusic stated: "This is a trio date that has all the elements: an indefatigable lyricism and honesty of emotion, as well as beautiful colors and deft, even uncanny engagements among the three principals. What a welcome return for Allen, who expertly displays she's been refining her chops and listening deeply to her Muse these past six years". The Penguin Guide to Jazz awarded it 4 stars, calling it "a graceful mixture of originals and standards that not only reference past performances but create a shimmering unity of sound that one can readily imagine hovering in the ether long after the record is over".

JazzTimes stated: "Although Geri Allen's versions of standards are marvelously performed, it is her originals that distinguish The Life of a Song. She's writing fresh, distinctive songs that are made even better when performed by a master trio".

== Track listing ==
All compositions by Geri Allen except as indicated

1. "LWB's House (The Remix)" - 5:52
2. "Mounts and Mountains" - 8:05
3. "Lush Life" (Billy Strayhorn) - 8:11
4. "In Appreciation: A Celebration Song" - 6:09
5. "The Experimental Movement" - 7:09
6. "Holdin' Court" - 4:39
7. "Dance of the Infidels" (Bud Powell) - 4:03
8. "Unconditional Love" - 5:16
9. "The Life of a Song" - 5:23
10. "Black Bottom" - 4:29
11. "Soul Eyes" (Mal Waldron) - 5:40

== Personnel ==
- Geri Allen - piano
- Dave Holland - bass
- Jack DeJohnette - drums
- Marcus Belgrave - flugelhorn (track 11)
- Dwight Andrews - saxophone (track 11)
- Clifton Anderson - trombone (track 11)
