= Eyes in the Back of Your Head =

Studio album by Geri Allen
- Released: August 12, 1997
- Recorded: December 14–15, 1995 & March 1, 1996
- Studio: Clinton Recording Studios, NYC
- Genre: Jazz
- Length: 54:51
- Label: Blue Note
- Producer: Geri Allen, Herb Jordan & Teo Macero

Geri Allen chronology
Some Aspects of Water (1997)	Eyes in the Back of Your Head (1997)	The Gathering (1998)

Eyes in the Back of Your Head is an album by the pianist Geri Allen, recorded in late 1995 and early 1996 and released on the Blue Note label.

== Reception ==
Professional ratings
Review scores
Source	Rating
AllMusic	4.5/5 stars

AllMusic stated: "The music is mostly avant-garde, but purposeful and logical in its own fashion. Well worth several listens". JazzTimes stated: "In conversation she's a thoroughly grounded woman, in music she brings that as well as a sense of storytelling and picture painting that never borders on the precious, and this recording is equal parts-pure Geri Allen, always rewarding".

== Track listing ==
All compositions by Geri Allen except as indicated:

1. "Mother Wit" - 3:05
2. "New Eyes Opening" - 5:37
3. "Vertical Flowing" (Geri Allen, Ornette Coleman) - 5:27
4. "M.O.P.E." - 6:11
5. "FMFMF (For My Family, for My Friends)" - 5:34
6. "Dark Eyes" (Geri Allen, Wallace Roney) - 4:20
7. "Little Waltz" (Ron Carter) - 6:11
8. "In the Back of Your Head" (Allen, Roney) - 5:52
9. "Windows to the Soul" - 5:11
10. "The Eyes Have It" (Allen, Ornette Coleman) - 7:23

== Personnel ==
- Geri Allen - piano, synthesizer
- Wallace Roney - trumpet (tracks 4, 6, 8 & 9)
- Ornette Coleman - alto saxophone (tracks 3 & 10)
- Cyro Baptista - percussion (tracks 1, 4 & 6)
