= Nightlife in Tokyo =

Studio album by Eric Alexander
- Released: June 17, 2003
- Recorded: December 19, 2002
- Studio: Avatar (New York, New York)
- Genre: Jazz
- Length: 58:28
- Label: Milestone
- Producer: Todd Barkan

Eric Alexander chronology
Summit Meeting (2002)	Nightlife in Tokyo (2003)	Dead Center (2004)

Nightlife in Tokyo is an album by tenor saxophonist Eric Alexander. It was recorded in 2002 and released by Milestone Records.

== Recording and music ==
The album was recorded in December 2002. The quartet contains tenor saxophonist Eric Alexander, pianist Harold Mabern, bassist Ron Carter, and drummer Joe Farnsworth. Five of the eight compositions are Alexander originals.

== Release and reception ==
Professional ratings
Review scores
Source	Rating
AllMusic	4/5 stars
The Penguin Guide to Jazz	3.5/4 stars

Nightlife in Tokyo was released by Milestone Records. The AllMusic reviewer wrote that, "Alexander offers a sustained program of fresh, creative, and advanced hard bop that unequivocally establishes him as a player who is not only fully aware of the tradition, but who is now among those most eminently qualified to develop it further." The Penguin Guide to Jazz commented that, "the small miracle is that Alexander keeps it all so fresh as far as the chief improviser's role is concerned."

== Track listing ==
All compositions by Eric Alexander except where noted

1. "Nemesis" – 7:58
2. "I Can Dream, Can't I?" (Sammy Fain, Irving Kahal) – 7:59
3. "Nightlife in Tokyo" (Harold Mabern) – 6:36
4. "I'll Be Around" (Alec Wilder) – 7:59
5. "Cold Smoke" – 8:25
6. "Island" – 7:40
7. "Big R.C." – 6:17
8. "Lock Up and Bow Out" – 5:32

== Personnel ==
- Eric Alexander – tenor saxophone
- Harold Mabern – piano
- Ron Carter – bass
- Joe Farnsworth – drums
