= Solid! =

Studio album by Eric Alexander
- Recorded: April 25, May 1, 1998
- Studio: Clinton Recording Studios, New York City
- Genre: Jazz
- Length: 60:35
- Label: Milestone
- Producer: Todd Barkan

Solid! is an album by Eric Alexander, with John Hicks, George Mraz, and Idris Muhammad.

== Background ==
"Anticipating Prestige's 50th anniversary in 1999, producer Todd Barkan combed the files to find out which were the label's most successful records and then, with Hicks, chose nine songs – not all of which are in the Prestige catalog, by the way – for this generation-spanning hard bop quartet to purvey."

== Recording and music ==
The album was recorded at Clinton Recording Studios in New York City on April 25 and May 1, 1998. The four main musicians are tenor saxophonist Eric Alexander, pianist John Hicks, bassist George Mraz, and drummer Idris Muhammad. Trumpeter Jim Rotondi plays on "Little Melonae" and "Straight Street"; vibraphonist Joe Locke substitutes for Alexander on "Fire Waltz". "Light Blue" is played by Hicks alone.

== Release and reception ==
Professional ratings
Review scores
Source	Rating
AllMusic	3/5 stars
The Penguin Guide to Jazz	3.5/4 stars

Solid! was released by Milestone Records. The Penguin Guide to Jazz stated that "Alexander's sound is again tremendous; some of his most precocious solos, vaulting into double-time, are enough to have one reaching for the repeat button". The AllMusic reviewer concluded: "Nothing startling here, but fans of uncompromising modern hard bop will definitely enjoy this."

== Track listing ==
1. "Solid"
2. "Little Melonae" (comp. Jackie McLean)
3. "Theme for Ernie"
4. "Fire Waltz"
5. "Four"
6. "Star-Crossed Lovers" (comp. Duke Ellington)
7. "My Conception"
8. "Light Blue"
9. "Straight Street"

== Personnel ==
- Eric Alexander – tenor saxophone
- John Hicks – piano
- George Mraz – bass
- Idris Muhammad – drums
- Jim Rotondi – trumpet (tracks 2, 9)
- Joe Locke – vibraphone (track 4)
