= The Second Milestone =

Studio album by Eric Alexander
- Released: 2001
- Recorded: December 2000
- Studio: Van Gelder Studio, Englewood Cliffs, NJ
- Genre: Jazz
- Length: 58:23
- Label: Milestone
- Producer: Todd Barkan

Eric Alexander chronology
The First Milestone (2000)	The Second Milestone (2001)	Summit Meeting (2002)

The Second Milestone is an album by tenor saxophonist Eric Alexander. It was recorded in 2000 and released by Milestone Records.

== Recording and music ==
The album was recorded in December 2000. Most of the tracks are played by the quartet of tenor saxophonist Eric Alexander, pianist Harold Mabern, bassist Peter Washington, and drummer Joe Farnsworth. Trumpeter Jim Rotondi plays on three tracks. "The Man from Hyde Park" is a reworking of "The Song Is You"; "Luna Naranja" is a samba.

== Release and reception ==
Professional ratings
Review scores
Source	Rating
AllMusic	4.5/5 stars
The Penguin Guide to Jazz	3.5/4 stars

The Second Milestone was released by Milestone Records. The AllMusic reviewer concluded: "This very impressive date is highly recommended."

== Track listing ==
1. "Matchmaker, Matchmaker" – 8:51
2. "The Second Milestone" – 6:05
3. "Moment to Moment" – 7:08
4. "The Man from Hyde Park" – 7:04
5. "Estate" – 7:42
6. "Luna Naranja" – 7:11
7. "John Neely Beautiful People" – 8:01
8. "The Cliffs of Asturias" – 6:21

== Personnel ==
- Eric Alexander – tenor saxophone
- Jim Rotondi – trumpet
- Harold Mabern – piano
- Peter Washington – bass
- Joe Farnsworth – drums
