= The First Milestone =

Studio album by Eric Alexander
- Released: April 18, 2000
- Recorded: November 3–4, 1999
- Studio: Clinton Recording Studios, NYC
- Genre: Jazz
- Length: 63:01
- Label: Milestone
- Producer: Todd Barkan

Eric Alexander chronology
Alexander the Great (2000)	The First Milestone (2000)	The Second Milestone (2001)

The First Milestone is an album by tenor saxophonist Eric Alexander. It was recorded in 1999 and released by Milestone Records.

== Recording and music ==
The album was recorded in November 1999. The quintet contains tenor saxophonist Eric Alexander, guitarist Pat Martino, pianist Harold Mabern, bassist Peter Washington, and drummer Joe Farnsworth. Several of the compositions are Alexander originals.

== Release and reception ==
Professional ratings
Review scores
Source	Rating
AllMusic	4/5 stars
The Penguin Guide to Jazz	3.5/4 stars

The First Milestone was released by Milestone Records. The AllMusic reviewer described it as "an excellent mainstream session". The Penguin Guide to Jazz commented that, on uptempo tracks, "There's a feel of much power held in gracious reserve, rather than being unwillingly checked."

== Track listing ==
All compositions by Eric Alexander except where noted

1. "Stand Pat" – 8:52
2. "#34 Was Sweetness (For Walter Payton)" – 7:06
3. "The First Milestone" – 7:36
4. "The Towering Inferno" – 8:41
5. "Night Song" (Lee Adams, Charles Strouse) – 8:55
6. "Last Night When We Were Young" (Harold Arlen, Yip Harburg) – 7:15
7. "The Phineas Trane" – 7:56
8. "I'm Glad There Is You" (Jimmy Dorsey, Paul Madeira) – 6:40

== Personnel ==
- Eric Alexander – tenor saxophone
- Pat Martino – guitar
- Harold Mabern – piano
- Peter Washington – bass
- Joe Farnsworth – drums
