= Live at Smalls =

Live album by Harold Mabern
- Released: June 25, 2013
- Recorded: June 22–23, 2012
- Venue: Smalls Jazz Club, New York City
- Genre: Jazz
- Length: 56:12
- Label: Smalls Live
- Producer: Spike Wilner, Ben Rubin

Harold Mabern chronology
| Mr. Lucky (2012) | Live at Smalls (2013) | Right on Time (2014) |

Live at Smalls is an album by pianist Harold Mabern. It was released by Smalls Live in 2013.

== Recording and music ==
The musicians are Harold Mabern (piano), John Webber (bass), and Joe Farnsworth (drums). The album was recorded in concert at Smalls Jazz Club in New York City on June 22–23, 2012. It was produced by Spike Wilner and Ben Rubin.

== Release and reception ==
The album was released by Smalls Live on June 25, 2013. The JazzTimes reviewer commented that Mabern "brings depth and sophistication to Fats Domino's R&B classic 'I'm Walking' [...] and his take on Mongo Santamaria's 'Afro Blue' manages to simultaneously straddle dark and edgy and cheerfully upbeat. The Sesame Street theme is utterly transformed into a showcase for the three players, and Erroll Garner's 'Dreaming' is appropriately laconic and contemplative."

== Track listing ==
1. "Alone Together" (Arthur Schwartz) – 11:41
2. "I'm Walking" (Fats Domino) – 10:47
3. "Dreaming" (Erroll Garner) – 5:05
4. "Road Song (Wes Montgomery) – 9:47
5. "Boogie for Al McShann" (Harold Mabern) – 4:21
6. "Sesame Street" (Joe Raposo) – 8:12
7. "Afro Blue" (Mongo Santamaria) – 6:19

== Personnel ==
- Harold Mabern – piano
- John Webber – bass
- Joe Farnsworth – drums
