= Lookin' on the Bright Side =

Studio album by Harold Mabern Trio
- Released: 1993
- Recorded: February 11 & March 3, 1993
- Genre: Jazz
- Length: 50:53
- Label: DIW; DIW 614
- Producer: Kazunori Sugiyama & James Williams

Harold Mabern chronology
| Philadelphia Bound (1991–92) | Lookin' on the Bright Side (1993) | The Leading Man (1993) |

Lookin' on the Bright Side is an album by pianist Harold Mabern which was originally released on the DIW label in Japan in 1993.

== Reception ==
The Allmusic review by Ken Dryden awarded the album 4 stars noting that "Harold Mabern was nearing his 57th birthday around the time of the two 1993 studio sessions that provided the music for this Japanese release; he's clearly in a mood to celebrate... Highly recommended for hard bop fans".

Professional ratings
Review scores
| Source | Rating |
|---|---|
| Allmusic | 4/5 stars |

== Track listing ==
All compositions by Harold Mabern except as indicated.

1. "Look on the Bright Side" - 5:33
2. "Moment's Notice" (John Coltrane) - 5:20
3. "Big Time Cooper" - 8:00
4. "Au Privave" (Charlie Parker) - 6:08
5. "Love Is a Many Splendored Thing" (Sammy Fain, Paul Francis Webster) - 5:08
6. "It's a Lonesome Old Town" (Charles Kisco, Harry Tobias) - 9:19
7. "Too Late to Fall Back Baby" - 6:52
8. "Our Waltz" (David Rose) - 4:22

== Personnel ==
- Harold Mabern – piano
- Christian McBride – bass
- Jack DeJohnette – drums
