= Chim Chim Cheree (album) =

Studio album by Eric Alexander
- Released: 2010
- Recorded: October 3, 2009
- Studio: Avatar Studio, New York
- Genre: Jazz
- Label: Venus
- Producer: Tetsuo Hara, Todd Barkan

Chim Chim Cheree is an album by tenor saxophonist Eric Alexander, recorded in 2009 and released by Venus Records in 2010.

== Recording ==
The album was recorded at the Avatar Studio in New York on October 3, 2009. It was produced by Tetsuo Hara and Todd Barkan. The four musicians are tenor saxophonist Eric Alexander, pianist Harold Mabern, bassist John Webber, and drummer Joe Farnsworth. The material is compositions by saxophonist John Coltrane and other pieces associated with him.

== Release and reception ==
Chim Chim Cheree was released by Venus Records in 2010. The IAJRC Journal reviewer concluded that Alexander's "tackling of the Coltrane oeuvre should have been of considerable interest. Except for a few instances, the results are a bit flat."

== Track listing ==
1. "You Don't Know What Love Is"
2. "Dear Lord"
3. "On a Misty Night"
4. "Chim Chim Cheree"
5. "Pursuance"
6. "Afro Blue"
7. "The Night Has a Thousand Eyes"
8. "Wise One"

== Personnel ==
- Eric Alexander – tenor saxophone
- Harold Mabern – piano
- John Webber – bass
- Joe Farnsworth – drums
