= Payne's Window =

Studio album by Cecil Payne
- Released: March 30, 1999
- Recorded: August 17 & 18, 1998
- Studio: Riverside Studios, Chicago
- Genre: Jazz
- Length: 72:57
- Label: Delmark; DE-509
- Producer: Robert G. Koester

Cecil Payne chronology
Scotch and Milk (1997)	Payne's Window (1999)	The Brooklyn Four Plus One (1999)

Payne's Window is an album by the American jazz saxophonist/flautist Cecil Payne recorded in 1998 and released by the Delmark label the following year.

== Reception ==
Professional ratings
Review scores
Source	Rating
AllMusic	3/5 stars
The Penguin Guide to Jazz Recordings	3.5/4 stars

Allmusic reviewer Michael G. Nastos noted: "This release for the 76-year-old baritone saxophonist does not fare as well as Cerupa and Scotch & Milk, primarily because his tone is thin and edgier than his partners, trombonist Steve Davis and the wonderful tenor saxophonist Eric Alexander. However, this is still a pretty good CD with nearly 73 minutes of vibrant, swinging modern jazz from the aforementioned horn players and especially the ever brilliant pianist Harold Mabern. ... Payne has all the support he needs. Perhaps his embouchure is wanting or he needs to tune up a little -- he is tonally challenged and that may dissuade some from championing him -- but more often than not, he's a successful team player, and that is evident in spades on this slightly off-putting but still enjoyable recording".

On All About Jazz Derek Taylor said "All things considered though this disc is a treat from start to finish and is easily recommended. Take a leisurely look through Payne's propitious window and you're guaranteed to be pleased by what you see". On the same site Jack Bowers stated "this is as congenial a bop-oriented small-group session as one is likely to encounter. One of Payne's greatest assets is that his pleasant, full-bodied baritone has a personality all its own; another is that he seems thoroughly relaxed and comfortable in any framework from ballad to burner".

== Track listing ==
All compositions by Cecil Payne, except where indicated.

1. "Spiritus Parkus" – 9:20
2. "Martin Luther King Jr." – 4:21
3. "James" – 7:33
4. "That's It Blues" – 8:44
5. "Payne's Window" (Steve Davis) – 7:33
6. "South Side Samba" (Benny Carter) – 7:05
7. "Lover Man" (Jimmy Davis, Ram Ramirez, Jimmy Sherman) – 4:34
8. "Tune-Up" (Miles Davis) – 8:42
9. "Delilah" (Victor Young) – 7:01
10. "Hold Tight" (Ed Robinson) – 8:04

== Personnel ==
- Cecil Payne – baritone saxophone, flute
- Steve Davis – trombone (tracks 1–6 & 8–10)
- Eric Alexander – tenor saxophone (tracks 1–6 & 8–10)
- Harold Mabern – piano
- John Webber – bass
- Joe Farnsworth – drums
