= Dead Center (Eric Alexander album) =

Studio album by Eric Alexander
- Released: September 14, 2004
- Recorded: June 10, 2004
- Studio: Van Gelder Studio, Englewood Cliffs, NJ
- Genre: Jazz
- Length: 51:57
- Label: HighNote
- Producer: Todd Barkan

Eric Alexander chronology
Gentle Ballads (2004)	Dead Center (2004)	Sunday in New York (2005)

Dead Center is an album by tenor saxophonist Eric Alexander. It was recorded in 2004 and released by HighNote Records.

== Recording and music ==
The album was recorded at the Van Gelder Studio on June 10, 2004. It was produced by Todd Barkan. The four musicians are tenor saxophonist Eric Alexander, pianist Harold Mabern, bassist John Webber, and drummer Joe Farnsworth. The arrangement of "Almost Like Being in Love" uses the harmony of "Giant Steps".

== Release and reception ==
Professional ratings
Review scores
Source	Rating
AllMusic	4/5 stars

Dead Center was released by HighNote Records in 2004. The AllMusic reviewer compared it to "the moody and atmospheric mid-to-late-'60s work of fellow reedmen Wayne Shorter and Hank Mobley", and concluded that the album "finds Alexander revealing himself as a grounded and muscular improviser who never takes his eye off the target." On All About Jazz, Russ Musto said "Eric Alexander is one of the jazz tradition's strongest proponents, possessing an inviting sound and style that can be proudly called classic. On Dead Center he forges straight ahead with a satisfying program of standards and seldom heard original compositions by jazz masters".

== Track listing ==
All compositions by Eric Alexander except where noted

1. "One for Steve" – 6:49
2. "Sonrisa" (Herbie Hancock) – 6:46
3. "Almost Like Being in Love" (Frederick Loewe, Alan Jay Lerner) – 6:41
4. "It's Magic" (Jule Styne, Sammy Cahn) – 6:25
5. "A Few Miles from Memphis" (Harold Mabern) – 7:01
6. "Search for Peace" (McCoy Tyner) – 8:03
7. "Dead Center" – 6:14
8. "I Could Have Danced All Night" (Loewe, Lerner) – 3:58

== Personnel ==
- Eric Alexander – tenor saxophone
- Harold Mabern – piano
- John Webber – bass
- Joe Farnsworth – drums
