= Temple of Olympic Zeus =

Studio album by Eric Alexander
- Released: August 28, 2007
- Recorded: January 17, 2007
- Studios: Van Gelder Studio, Englewood Cliffs, NJ
- Genre: Jazz
- Length: 56:27
- Labels: HighNote; HCD 7172
- Producer: Todd Barkan

Eric Alexander chronology
Gentle Ballads II (2006)	Temple of Olympic Zeus (2007)	My Favorite Things (2007)

Temple of Olympic Zeus is an album by saxophonist Eric Alexander which was recorded in 2007 and released on the HighNote label.

== Reception ==
Professional ratings
Review scores
Source	Rating
Allmusic	4/5 stars
All About Jazz	4/5 stars

In his review on Allmusic, Scott Yanow states "Eric Alexander has developed into one of the giants of the tenor sax. He is not an avant-garde trailblazer; nor are there scores of saxophonists who sound like his clones. But Alexander has developed his own sound within the areas of hard bop to post-bop; he gives the impression that he can sound confident and very credible in any setting, and he has yet to make an unworthy recording. He has led at least 20 CD recordings since his emergence, with Temple of Olympic Zeus being one of his best ... a brilliant improviser who deserves much more recognition for invigorating jazz's modern mainstream". On All About Jazz, Jack Bowers said "This is a splendid example of Alexander's steady maturation as a tenor virtuoso in a more intimate setting. Alexander always comes to play, and always brings fresh and provocative ideas to the table". In JazzTimes, Steve Greenlee wrote "For all the blue light of the burners, Alexander exudes warmth, too, particularly when he slows things down ... He’s got a big, muscular tone, yes, but he’s also got a soft touch".

== Track listing ==
All compositions by Eric Alexander except where noted

1. "The Temple of Olympic Zeus" – 7:51
2. "Someday We'll All Be Free" (Donny Hathaway, Edward Howard) – 6:20
3. "Dave's System" – 6:52
4. "Some Other Time" (Betty Comden, Adolph Green) – 5:10
5. "Blues for David" (Curtis Montgomery) – 9:18
6. "Lucas Too" – 7:14
7. "I'm Gonna Laugh You Right Out of My Life" (Cy Coleman, Carolyn Leigh) – 7:53
8. "I'll Keep Loving You" (Bud Powell) – 5:25

== Personnel ==
- Eric Alexander – tenor saxophone
- James Rotondi – trumpet, flugelhorn (tracks 1–3 & 6)
- David Hazeltine – piano
- Nat Reeves – bass
- Joe Farnsworth – drums
