= Ride on Time (disambiguation) =

"Ride on Time" is a 1989 song by Black Box.

Ride on Time may also refer to:

- Ride on Time (album), a 1980 album by Tatsuro Yamashita
  - "Ride on Time" (Tatsuro Yamashita song), 1980
- "Ride on Time" (MAX song), 1998

== See also ==
- Right on Time (disambiguation)
