= Right on Time =

Right on Time may refer to:

- Right on Time (Brothers Johnson album), 1977, and its title song
- Right on Time (Gretchen Wilson album), 2013, or the title song
- Right on Time (Harold Mabern album), 2014
- "Right on Time" (Brandi Carlile song), 2021
- "Right on Time" (Lindsay Ell song), 2022
- "Right on Time", a song by Red Hot Chili Peppers from Californication
- "Right on Time", a song by Skrillex from the Bangarang EP
- "Right on Time, a song by Joey Badass from Summer Knights

== See also ==
- "Ride on Time", a 1989 single by Black Box
