= Mabern Plays Mabern =

Live album by Harold Mabern
- Released: March 20, 2020
- Recorded: January 5–7, 2018
- Venue: Smoke, New York City
- Genre: Jazz
- Length: 69:53
- Label: Smoke Sessions
- Producer: Paul Stache, Damon Smith

Harold Mabern chronology
The Iron Man: Live at Smoke (2018)	Mabern Plays Mabern (2018)

Mabern Plays Mabern is an album by pianist Harold Mabern. It was recorded in 2018 and released by Smoke Sessions Records.

== Recording and music ==
The sextet contained Harold Mabern (piano), Eric Alexander (tenor sax), Vincent Herring (alto sax), Steve Davis (trombone), John Webber (bass), and Joe Farnsworth (drums). The album was recorded in concert at Smoke jazz club in New York on January 5–7, 2018. It was produced by Paul Stache and Damon Smith.

Mabern wrote all except two of the compositions: Alexander's "The Iron Man", and "Lover Man". "Mr. Johnson" is a modal piece dedicated to trombonist J. J. Johnson. "Edward Lee" refers to trumpeter Lee Morgan, with whom Mabern played; it first appeared on the pianist's Pisces Calling, as did "Lyrical Cole-Man".

== Release and reception ==
The album was released by Smoke Sessions Records on March 20, 2020.

Some reviewers compared it with The Iron Man: Live at Smoke, which was recorded during the same set of concert appearances, but released earlier. DownBeat wrote that Mabern Plays Mabern "burns a bit brighter than its predecessor", and credited the addition of Herring and Davis for the change. The All About Jazz reviewer, in contrast, believed that the album was "a tad more subdued" than its predecessor.

== Track listing ==
1. "Mr. Johnson"
2. "The Iron Man"
3. "Lover Man"
4. "Lyrical Cole-Man"
5. "Edward Lee"
6. "It's Magic"
7. "The Beehive"
8. "Rakin' and Scrapin'"

== Personnel ==
- Harold Mabern – piano
- Eric Alexander – tenor sax
- Vincent Herring – alto sax
- Steve Davis – trombone
- John Webber – bass
- Joe Farnsworth – drums
