= Mr. Lucky (Harold Mabern album) =

Studio album by Harold Mabern
- Released: 2012
- Recorded: May 10, 2012
- Studio: Van Gelder Studio, Englewood Cliffs, New Jersey
- Genre: Jazz
- Length: 54:17
- Label: HighNote (HCD 7237)
- Producer: Harold Mabern, Don Sickler

Harold Mabern chronology
Misty (2006)	Mr. Lucky (2012)	Live at Smalls (2013)

Mr. Lucky: A Tribute to Sammy Davis Jr. is an album by pianist Harold Mabern. It was recorded in 2012 and released in the same year by HighNote Records.

== Recording and music ==
The album was recorded on May 10, 2012, at Van Gelder Studio, Englewood Cliffs, New Jersey. The material, as the sub-title suggests, relates to entertainer Sammy Davis Jr., and consists of "a mix of songs from musicals, movies and Davis' hit records." For most of the tracks, pianist Harold Mabern plays with tenor saxophonist Eric Alexander, bassist John Webber and drummer Joe Farnsworth. "Hey There" is a solo piano performance, and "What Kind of Fool Am I" is played by the trio without Alexander. The album was produced by Mabern and Don Sickler.

== Release and reception ==
Professional ratings
Review scores
Source	Rating
AllMusic	4/5 stars
All About Jazz	4/5 stars
All About Jazz	2/5 stars

Mr. Lucky was released by HighNote Records in 2012. The JazzTimes reviewer commented that, "precious few records swing so efficiently and reliably as Mr. Lucky." The AllMusic review ended with the line: "Hopefully this outstanding addition to Harold Mabern's discography will inspire U.S. labels to record the veteran on a more frequent basis." On All About Jazz reviewers were divided, Jack Bowers noted "Mabern never wavers when it is his turn to shine, swinging freely and happily through every number while endorsing the premise that, perhaps, Sammy Davis Jr. was lucky after all to have admirers like Mabern and crew singing his praises more than two decades after his passing" while Greg Simmons felt "Pianist Harold Mabern's Mr. Lucky is a bon-bon: all sugar, with no protein or vitamins ... in the end, Mr. Lucky is disappointing. This is a really talented band, capable of far greater than what was turned in here. Put this one on during a dinner party. It's lively and it won't offend anyone, but it doesn't say anything either".

== Track listing ==
1. "The People Tree" (Leslie Bricusse, Anthony Newley) – 5:26
2. "As Long as She Needs Me" (Lionel Bart) – 5:43
3. "Soft Shoe Trainin' with Sammy" (Harold Mabern) – 5:47
4. "Hey There" (Jerry Ross, Richard Adler) – 5:05
5. "I've Gotta Be Me" (Walter Marks) – 7:54
6. "Mr. Lucky" (Henry Mancini) – 5:21
7. "What Kind of Fool Am I?" (Bricusse, Newley) – 4:31
8. "Night Song" (Charles Strouse, Lee Adams) – 7:45
9. "Something's Gotta Give" (Johnny Mercer) – 6:42

== Personnel ==
- Harold Mabern – piano
- Eric Alexander – tenor sax (tracks 1–3, 5, 6, 8, 9)
- John Webber – bass (tracks 1–3, 5–9)
- Joe Farnsworth – drums (tracks 1–3, 5–9)
