= Afro Blue (Harold Mabern album) =

Album by pianist Harold Mabern

Studio album by Harold Mabern
- Released: 2015
- Recorded: August 21 & 29, 2014
- Genre: Jazz
- Length: 69:41
- Label: Smoke Sessions

Afro Blue is an album by pianist Harold Mabern. It was released by Smoke Sessions Records.

== Background ==
Mabern frequently worked with vocalists in the 1960s, but this recording was the first album of his to feature singers. The pianist had previously played with vocalist Gregory Porter at the Smoke jazz club in December 2011, and the idea for the album came out of that and Mabern commenting to the club (and Smoke Sessions Records) proprietor that he would like to record with vocalists.

== Recording and music ==
The album was recorded over two days. Mabern plays with bassist John Webber and drummer Joe Farnsworth on all of the tracks except "Don't Misunderstand", which is a Mabern-Norah Jones duet. The duet was suggested by the vocalist; the song is played in A-flat major. Guitarist Peter Bernstein is added to the trio for one instrumental number. Tenor saxophonist Eric Alexander plays on 10 of the tracks on the album; trombonist Steve Turre plays on six tracks and trumpeter Jeremy Pelt on four. The guest vocalists appear separately: Gregory Porter, Norah Jones, and Jane Monheit for two tracks each; Kurt Elling for three tracks; and Alexis Cole for one.

The opening track – "The Chief" – is a Mabern tribute to saxophonist John Coltrane. The closing track – "Bobby, Benny, Jymie, Lee, Bu" – is a tribute to Art Blakey's Jazz Messengers. "The Man from Hyde Park" refers to Herbie Hancock, with whom Mabern developed a friendship when they were both in Chicago in the 1950s.

== Release and reception ==
Professional ratings
Review scores
Source	Rating
Down Beat	3.5/5 stars

Afro Blue was released by Smoke Sessions Records. The Down Beat reviewer wrote: "The band feels restrained and often the arrangements don't feel challenging enough, but throughout Mabern's piano is strong." Jazziz concluded that: "Throughout a set that encompasses various voices, moods and styles, Mabern and this stellar band provide consistent excellence."

== Track listing ==
1. "The Chief"
2. "Afro Blue"
3. "The Man from Hyde Park"
4. "Fools Rush In"
5. "Don't Misunderstand"
6. "I'll Take Romance"
7. "My One and Only Love"
8. "Billie's Bounce"
9. "Portrait of Jennie"
10. "You Needed Me"
11. "Such Is Life"
12. "Do It Again"
13. "Mozzin'"
14. "Bobby, Benny, Jymie, Lee, Bu"

== Personnel ==
- Harold Mabern – piano
- John Webber – bass (tracks 1–4, 6–14)
- Joe Farnsworth – drums (tracks 1–4, 6–14)
- Eric Alexander – tenor sax (tracks 1–4, 6–11)
- Jeremy Pelt – trumpet (tracks 2, 4, 6, 11)
- Steve Turre – trombone (tracks 1, 2, 4, 6, 8, 11)
- Peter Bernstein – guitar (track 12)
- Gregory Porter – vocals (tracks 2, 3)
- Norah Jones – vocals (tracks 4, 5)
- Jane Monheit – vocals (tracks 6, 7)
- Kurt Elling – vocals (tracks 8–10)
- Alexis Cole – vocals (track 11)
