= Straight Up (Eric Alexander album) =

1992 album by Eric Alexander

Studio album by Eric Alexander
- Released: 1993
- Recorded: August 21–22, 1992
- Studio: Riverside Studio, Chicago
- Genre: Jazz
- Label: Delmark

Eric Alexander chronology
| Straight Up (1993) | New York Calling (1993) |

Straight Up is the debut album by tenor saxophonist Eric Alexander. It was recorded in 1992 and released by Delmark Records.

== Recording and music ==
The album was recorded at Riverside Studio, Chicago, on August 21–22, 1992. The five musicians are tenor saxophonist Eric Alexander, trumpeter Jim Rotondi, pianist Harold Mabern, bassist John Webber, and drummer George Fludas.

== Release and reception ==
Professional ratings
Review scores
| Source | Rating |
|---|---|
| AllMusic | 4/5 stars |
| The Penguin Guide to Jazz | 3/4 stars |

Straight Up was released by Delmark Records. It was Alexander's first album as leader. The AllMusic reviewer wrote that Alexander "has a full, bright, impressive tone, excellent facility and command of the instrument and is steadily developing a personal sound. While the tracks vary in quality, most are at worst competent and at best outstanding."

== Track listing ==
1. "Straight Up" (Eric Alexander) – 8:24
2. "What Are You Doing the Rest of Your Life?" (Alan Bergman, Marilyn Bergman, Michel Legrand) – 8:25
3. "Be My Love" (Nicholas Brodszky, Sammy Cahn) – 7:49
4. "Blues Waltz" (Ray Charles) – 8:05
5. "Laura" (Johnny Mercer, David Raksin) – 8:02
6. "An Oscar for Treadwell" (Charlie Parker) – 7:21
7. "The End of a Love Affair" (Edward Redding) – 8:08
8. "Love Is a Many Splendored Thing" (Sammy Fain, Paul Francis Webster) – 7:57

== Personnel ==
- Eric Alexander – tenor saxophone
- Jim Rotondi – trumpet
- Harold Mabern – piano
- John Webber – bass
- George Fludas – drums
