= The Real Thing (Eric Alexander album) =

Studio album by Eric Alexander
- Released: 2015
- Recorded: April 2, 2015
- Studio: Van Gelder Studio, Englewood Cliffs, New Jersey
- Genre: Jazz
- Label: HighNote
- Producer: Eric Alexander

The Real Thing is an album by tenor saxophonist Eric Alexander. It was recorded in 2015 and released by HighNote Records.

== Recording and music ==
The album was recorded at the Van Gelder Studio, Englewood Cliffs, New Jersey, on April 2, 2015. Most tracks are played by the quartet of tenor saxophonist Eric Alexander, pianist Harold Mabern, bassist John Webber, and drummer Joe Farnsworth. Guitarist Pat Martino is added for three tracks. Alexander also produced the album.

== Release and reception ==
Professional ratings
Review scores
Source	Rating
Down Beat	3/5 stars

The Real Thing was released by HighNote Records. The Down Beat reviewer concluded that, "The prolific saxophonist, who claims almost 40 records to his name, has matured to the point where even a not-entirely-satisfying effort like this is still worth returning to."

== Track listing ==
1. "The Real Thing"
2. "Pure Pat"
3. "Summertime"
4. "The Night Has a Thousand Eyes"
5. "Little Boat"
6. "For George and Trane"
7. "Sleep Warm"
8. "The Chief"

== Personnel ==
- Eric Alexander – tenor saxophone
- Harold Mabern – piano
- John Webber – bass
- Joe Farnsworth – drums
- Pat Martino – guitar (tracks 2–3, 8)
