= Harold Mabern =

American jazz pianist and composer (1936–2019)

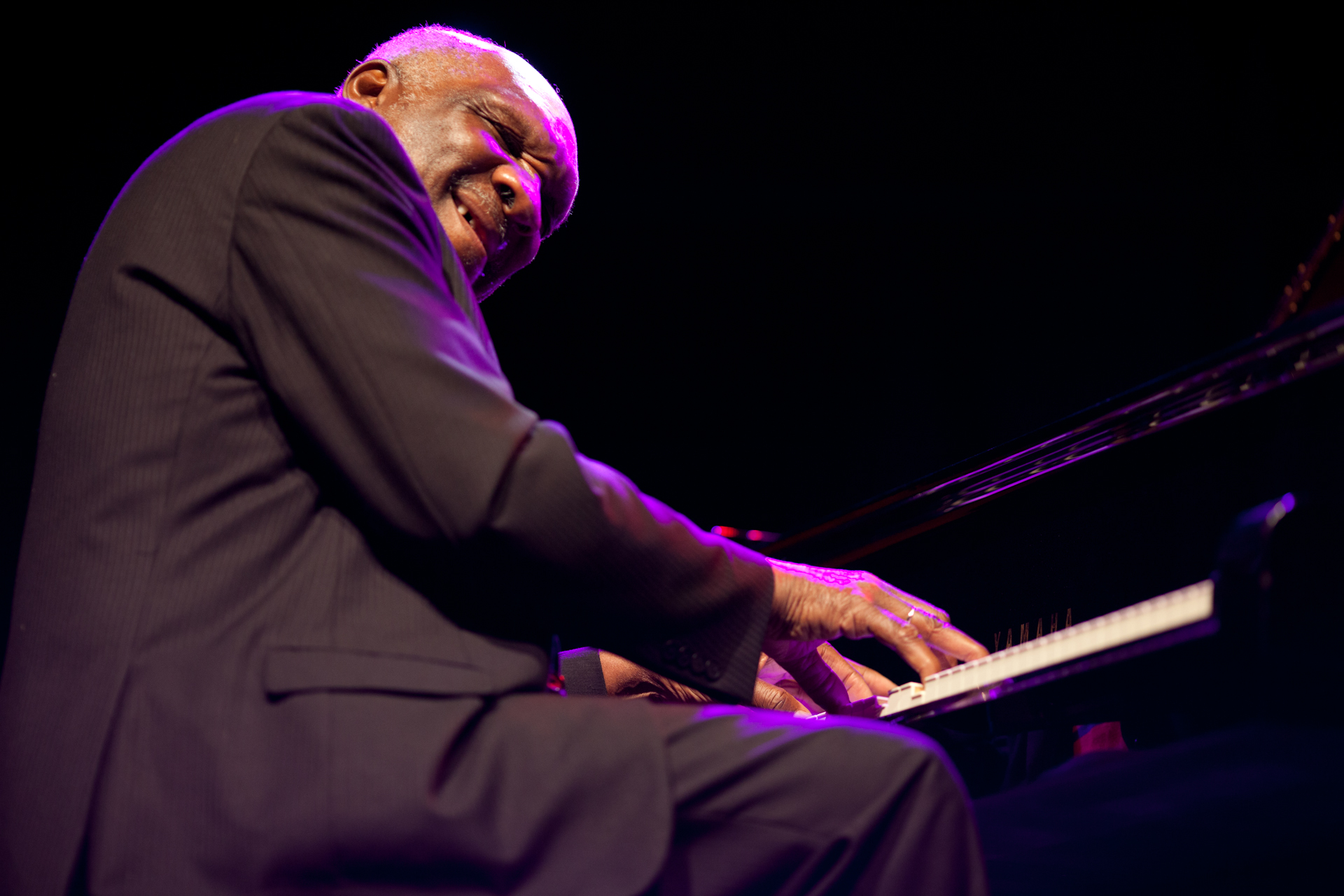
- Mabern in 2012

Background information
- Born: Harold Mabern Jr. March 20, 1936; Memphis, Tennessee, U.S.
- Died: September 17, 2019 (aged 83) New Jersey, U.S.
- Genre: Jazz
- Occupations: Musician, composer
- Instrument: Piano
- Years active: 1950s–2019
- Labels: Sackville, Prestige, DIW, Smoke Sessions

Harold Mabern Jr. (March 20, 1936 – September 17, 2019) was an American jazz pianist and composer, principally in the hard bop, post-bop, and soul jazz fields. He is described in The Penguin Guide to Jazz Recordings as "one of the great post-bop pianists".

== Early life ==
Mabern was born in Memphis, Tennessee on March 20, 1936. He initially started learning drums before switching to learning piano. He had access to a piano from his teens, after his father, who worked in a lumber yard, saved to buy him one. Mabern learned by watching and emulating pianists Charles Thomas and Phineas Newborn Jr. Mabern attended Douglass High School, before transferring to Manassas High School; he played with saxophonists Frank Strozier, George Coleman and trumpeter Booker Little at this time, but was most influenced by Newborn Jr.

In 1954, after graduating, Mabern moved to Chicago, intending to attend the American Conservatory of Music. He was unable to afford to attend music college because of a change in his parents' financial circumstances, but had private lessons there for six months and developed his reading ability by playing with trombonist Morris Ellis' big band. He also developed by listening to Ahmad Jamal and others in clubs, and "playing and practicing 12 hours a day" for the next five years, but he remained self-taught as a pianist. Mabern went on to play with Walter Perkins' MJT + 3 and others in Chicago.

Mabern learned orchestration techniques from bassist Bill Lee, and comping and chord voicing from pianists Chris Anderson and Billy Wallace.

== 1959–1967 ==
Mabern moved to New York City in 1959. According to his own account, he moved there with saxophonist Frank Strozier on November 21, 1959, checked in at a hotel and then went to Birdland, where he met Cannonball Adderley, who asked him if he wanted a gig. Mabern accepted and was shown inside, where trumpeter Harry "Sweets" Edison, who was looking for a pianist to replace the soon-to-depart Tommy Flanagan, auditioned him and offered him the place. A few weeks later, most of the members of this band then joined Jimmy Forrest for a recording in Chicago that resulted in the albums All the Gin Is Gone and Black Forrest, which were also guitarist Grant Green's debut recordings.

Mabern steadily built a reputation in New York as a sideman, playing with, among others, Lionel Hampton's big band in 1960 (including a tour of Europe), the Jazztet for 18 months in the period 1961–62, accompanying vocalists, including Betty Carter, Johnny Hartman and Arthur Prysock, and working with trumpeter Donald Byrd and drummer Roy Haynes. After completing a 1963 tour with Haynes, he had a six-week engagement at the Black Hawk in San Francisco with Miles Davis. Mabern went on to spend time with J. J. Johnson in 1963–65 after being briefly with Sonny Rollins. In 1965, he also played with Lee Morgan, an association that continued on and off until the night in February 1972 that Morgan was shot dead at Slug's Saloon, with Mabern present. Mabern toured in Europe with Wes Montgomery later in 1965 as part of a band that had been together for around two years before the European tour, traveling as a quartet from gig to gig in one car. From 1965, Mabern also worked with Freddie Hubbard, Jackie McLean, Hank Mobley, Blue Mitchell (1966), Sarah Vaughan, and Joe Williams (1966–67).

== 1968–2019 ==
Mabern's recording career as a leader began in 1968, after he signed for Prestige Records early that year. His first album, A Few Miles from Memphis, featured several of his own originals. Further dates for Prestige were released, and Mabern recorded approximately 20 albums as leader, for many labels. Mabern worked intermittently over a period of four decades with George Coleman, beginning in the 1960s, and including an appearance at the 1976 Newport Jazz Festival. From the early 1970s, he worked with trumpeters Clark Terry and Joe Newman, played jazz-pop electric piano with George Benson and Stanley Turrentine, was part of drummer Walter Bolden's trio (1973–74), and led his own trio with Bolden and bassist Jamil Nasser.

Among other musicians Mabern played with from this period were Milt Jackson in 1977, and Billy Harper for a tour of Japan in the same year. Four years later, Mabern toured Europe with George Coleman, and played with Eddie "Cleanhead" Vinson. The following year, Mabern played with James Moody.

There were also performances and recordings with innumerable other musicians, both as leader and sideman. Mabern also worked with two piano-based groups: the Piano Choir, formed and led by Stanley Cowell from the early 1970s and featuring at least six pianists/keyboardists, and the four-player Contemporary Piano Ensemble, the latter being formed in the early 1990s to pay tribute to Phineas Newborn Jr. and touring extensively, including at the Montreal (1991) and Monterey Jazz Festivals (1996).

Mabern had a career resurgence after his album Straight Street was a success in Japan in 1989. He visited Japan in 1990 as a member of a ten-pianist group that toured together but played and recorded separately. In the mid-1990s, Mabern toured with and led a trio of bassist Erik Applegate and drummer Ed Thigpen. In later years, he recorded extensively with his former William Paterson University student, the tenor saxophonist Eric Alexander. In 2010, Mabern received the Don Redman Heritage Award.

Mabern's repute in Japan was reflected in his signing by the Japanese label Venus, which resulted in six albums from 2002; Mabern stated in 2004 that his 2002 recording for Venus, Kiss of Fire, featuring Alexander as a guest, was his best seller. A longtime faculty member at William Paterson University (from 1981), Mabern was a frequent instructor at the Stanford Jazz Workshop. Mabern's stated piano preference was "naturally the Steinway D, but if you can't get a D, any Steinway".

In 2015, Mabern released Afro Blue, "the first of Mabern's two dozen leader dates to showcase the context in which he worked frequently during the 1960s: accompanying vocalists". "Mabern played in Britain [...] in 2017 and 2018 with a quartet featuring Alexander, and finally for two evenings with his trio at Ronnie Scott's club in May 2019." Mabern, who was a regular at Smoke (jazz club) recorded his final four albums on the club's label Smoke Sessions.

Mabern died of a heart attack in New Jersey on 17 September 2019.

== Playing style ==
Mabern's piano style was described as being "aggressive, very positive, crashing out chords that drop like pile drivers and warming up and down the keyboard with huge, whooping bursts of action", while, at the same time, he showed "a keen sensitivity" as "an extremely perceptive accompanist". Critic Gary Giddins identified some of the characteristics of Mabern's playing as being "blues glisses, [...] tremolos and dissonant block chords", that help to create a style "that marries McCoy Tyner's clustering modality with rippling asides that stem from [Art] Tatum". The influence of Phineas Newborn Jr. remained noticeable: Mabern employed Newborn's "manner of playing fast lines in a two-handed octave (or two-octave) unison, and uses this device in wildly imaginative ways".

When accompanying vocalists, Mabern stated that he played with "less force, less aggression. I use the soft pedal. You don't voice the chord with the leading tone. You wait for them to sing a phrase, then fill in the space."

== Discography ==
=== As leader/co-leader ===
Recording date	Title	Label	Year released	Notes
1968–03	A Few Miles from Memphis	Prestige	1968	Mabern's first release as leader
1968–12	Rakin' and Scrapin'	Prestige	1969	Mabern also plays electric piano
1969–06	Workin' & Wailin'	Prestige	1969	Mabern also plays electric piano
1970–01	Greasy Kid Stuff!	Prestige	1970	Sextet, with Lee Morgan (trumpet), Hubert Laws (flute, tenor sax), Buster Williams (bass), Idris Muhammad (drums), Joe Jones (guitar; 1 track)
1978–06	Pisces Calling	Trident	1980	Trio, with Jamil Nasser (bass), Walter Bolden (drums)
1984–04, 1985–01	Joy Spring	Sackville	1985	Solo piano; in concert
1989–12	Straight Street	DIW	1991	Most tracks trio, with Ron Carter (bass), Jack DeJohnette (drums); one track solo piano
1991–04, 1992–02	Philadelphia Bound	Sackville	1994	Duo, with Kieran Overs (bass)
1992–06	A Season of Ballads	Space Time	1997	Trio, with Ray Drummond (bass), Alan Dawson (drums); album shared with Donald Brown and Charles Thomas trios
1992–11, 1993–01 – 1993–04	The Leading Man	DIW	1993	Some tracks trio, with Ron Carter (bass), Jack DeJohnette (drums); some tracks with a guest, Bill Mobley (trumpet, flugelhorn), Bill Easley (alto sax), Kevin Eubanks (guitar), Pamela Baskin-Watson (vocals); one track piano solo; later Columbia issue has some different trio tracks, with Christian McBride (bass), DeJohnette (drums)
1993–02 – 1993–03	Lookin' on the Bright Side	DIW	1993	Trio, with Christian McBride (bass), Jack DeJohnette (drums)
1995–01	For Phineas	Sackville	1996	Duo, with Geoff Keezer (piano); in concert
1996–08	Mabern's Grooveyard	DIW	1998	Trio, with Christian McBride (bass), Tony Reedus (drums)
1999–06	Maya with Love	DIW	2000	Trio, with Christian McBride (bass), Tony Reedus (drums)
2001–10	Falling in Love with Love	Venus	2002	Trio, with George Mraz (bass), Joe Farnsworth (drums)
2001–12	Kiss of Fire	Venus	2002	Trio, with Nat Reeves (bass), Joe Farnsworth (drums); Eric Alexander (tenor sax) as guest
2003–04	Don't Know Why	Venus	2004	Trio, with Nat Reeves (bass), Joe Farnsworth (drums)
2004–06	Fantasy	Venus	2004	Trio, with Dwayne Burno (bass), Joe Farnsworth (drums)
2005–11	Somewhere Over the Rainbow	Venus	2006	Trio, with Dwayne Burno (bass), Willie Jones III (drums)
2006–12	Misty	Venus	2007	Solo piano
2012–05	Mr. Lucky	HighNote	2012	Most tracks quartet, with Eric Alexander (tenor sax), John Webber (bass), Joe Farnsworth (drums); one track trio, without Alexander; one track solo piano
2012–06	Live at Smalls	SmallsLive	2013	Trio, with John Webber (bass), Joe Farnsworth (drums); in concert
2013–03	Right on Time	Smoke Sessions	2014	Trio, with John Webber (bass), Joe Farnsworth (drums); in concert
2014–08	Afro Blue	Smoke Sessions	2015	With Eric Alexander (tenor sax), John Webber (bass), Joe Farnsworth (drums); plus guests Jeremy Pelt (trumpet), Steve Turre (trombone), Peter Bernstein (guitar), Alexis Cole, Kurt Elling, Norah Jones, Jane Monheit, Gregory Porter (vocals)
2017–04	To Love and Be Loved	Smoke Sessions	2017	Most tracks quartet, with Eric Alexander (tenor sax), Nat Reeves (bass), Jimmy Cobb (drums); some tracks quintet, with Freddie Hendrix (trumpet) or Cyro Baptista (percussion) added; one track solo piano
2018–01	Mabern Plays Mabern	Smoke Sessions	2020	Sextet, with Eric Alexander (tenor sax), Vincent Herring (alto sax), Steve Davis (trombone), John Webber (bass), Joe Farnsworth (drums); in concert
2018–01	Mabern Plays Coltrane	Smoke Sessions	2021	Sextet, with Eric Alexander (tenor sax), Vincent Herring (alto sax), Steve Davis (trombone), John Webber (bass), Joe Farnsworth (drums); in concert
2018–01	The Iron Man: Live at Smoke	Smoke Sessions	2018	[2CD] Quartet, with Eric Alexander (tenor sax), John Webber (bass), Joe Farnsworth (drums); in concert

=== As sideman ===
Year recorded	Leader	Title	Label
1959	Jimmy Forrest	All the Gin Is Gone	Delmark
1959	Jimmy Forrest	Black Forrest	Delmark
1960	Frank Strozier	MJT + 3	Vee-Jay
1961	Art Farmer	Perception	Argo
1962	The Jazztet	Here and Now	Mercury
1962	The Jazztet	Another Git Together	Mercury
1962	Frank Strozier	March of the Siamese Children	Jazzland
1963	Jimmy Heath	Swamp Seed	Riverside
1963	Roland Kirk	Reeds & Deeds	Mercury
1963	Roland Kirk	The Roland Kirk Quartet Meets the Benny Golson Orchestra	Mercury
1964	Betty Carter	Inside Betty Carter	United Artists
1964	J.J. Johnson	Proof Positive	Impulse!
1965	Jackie McLean	Consequence	Blue Note
1965	Hank Mobley	Dippin'	Blue Note
1965	Lee Morgan	The Gigolo	Blue Note
1965	Freddie Hubbard	The Night of the Cookers	Blue Note
1965	Freddie Hubbard	Blue Spirits	Blue Note
1965	Wes Montgomery	Kings of the Guitar	Beppo
1965	Wes Montgomery	Jazz 625	Vap
1965	Wes Montgomery	Solitude	BYG
1965	Wes Montgomery	Belgium 1965 Rounder	Vestapool
1966	Blue Mitchell	Bring It Home to Me	Blue Note
1967	Buddy Terry	Electric Soul!	Prestige
1968	Joe Jones	My Fire!	Prestige
1970	Lee Morgan	Live at the Lighthouse	Blue Note
1970	Idris Muhammad	Black Rhythm Revolution!	Prestige
1970	Gene Ammons	The Black Cat!	Prestige
1970	Terumasa Hino	Alone Together	Columbia
1971	Lee Morgan	The Last Session	Blue Note
1971	Stanley Turrentine	The Sugar Man	CTI
1973	Stanley Turrentine	Don't Mess with Mister T.	CTI
1973	George Benson	Body Talk	CTI
1973	Tiny Grimes	Profoundly Blue	Muse
1973	The Piano Choir	Handscapes	Strata-East
1974	Frank Foster	The Loud Minority	Mainstream
1974*	George Freeman	Man & Woman	Groove Merchant
1975	The Piano Choir	Handscapes 2	Strata-East
1976	Frank Foster	Here and Now	Catalyst
1976	Frank Strozier	Remember Me	SteepleChase
1977	Frank Strozier	What's Goin' On	SteepleChase
1977	Billy Harper	Soran-Bushi, B.H.	Denon
1977	George Coleman	Revival	Catalyst
1978	Walt Bolden	Walt Bolden	Nemperor
1978	Richie Cole	Keeper of the Flame	Muse
1978	Louis Smith	Just Friends	SteepleChase
1979	Louis Hayes	Variety Is the Spice	Gryphon
1983	Lee Willhite	First Venture	Big Tampa
1985*	George Coleman	Manhattan Panorama	Theresa
1987	George Coleman	At Yoshi's	Theresa
1989	Contemporary Piano Ensemble	Four Pianos for Phineas	Evidence
1990	100 Gold Fingers	Piano Playhouse 1990	Absord Music Japan
1990	Lewis Keel	Coming out Swinging	Muse
1992	Eric Alexander	Straight Up	Delmark
1993	Eric Alexander	Up, Over & Out	Delmark
1993	Donald Brown	Cartunes	Muse
1993	Contemporary Piano Ensemble	The Key Players	Sony
1993	Cecil Payne	Cerupa	Delmark
1996	Cecil Payne	Scotch and Milk	Delmark
1996	Andy Goodrich	Motherless Child	Delmark
1997	Eric Alexander	Mode for Mabes	Delmark
1997	Steve Davis	Crossfire	Criss Cross
1997	Jim Rotondi	Jim's Bop	Criss Cross
1998	Cecil Payne	Payne's Window	Delmark
1998	George Coleman	I Could Write a Book: The Music of Richard Rogers	Telarc
1999	Eric Alexander	Live at the Keynote	Video Arts
1999	Eric Alexander	The First Milestone	Milestone
2000	Eric Alexander	The Second Milestone	Milestone
2000	Cecil Payne	Chic Boom: Live at the Jazz Showcase	Delmark
2001	Eric Alexander	Summit Meeting	Milestone
2002	Eric Alexander	Nightlife in Tokyo	Milestone
2003	Archie Shepp	Deja Vu	Venus
2004	Eric Alexander	Dead Center	HighNote
2004*	Joe Farnsworth	It's Prime Time	Village
2004	Ned Otter	Powder Keg	Two & Four
2005	Eric Alexander	It's All in the Game	HighNote
2006	Mike DiRubbo	New York Accent	Cellar Live
2009	Eric Alexander	Revival of the Fittest	HighNote
2009	Eric Alexander	Chim Chim Cheree	Venus
2010	Eric Alexander	Don't Follow the Crowd	HighNote
2011	Joe Farnsworth	Super Prime Time	Sony
2012	Eric Alexander	Touching	HighNote
2013	Eric Alexander	Blues at Midnight	Venus
2013	Eric Alexander	Chicago Fire	HighNote
2014*	Eric Alexander	Recado Bossa Nova	Venus
2015	Eric Alexander	The Real Thing	HighNote
2015*	Steve Davis	Say When	Smoke Sessions
2016	Eric Alexander	Second Impression	HighNote
2018	Cory Weeds	Live at Frankie's Jazz Club	Cellar Live
2019	George Coleman	The Quartet	Smoke Sessions
2019	Jimmy Cobb	This I Dig of You	Smoke Sessions
