= Up, Over & Out =

Studio album by Eric Alexander
- Released: 1995
- Recorded: August 1993
- Genre: Jazz
- Label: Delmark

Eric Alexander chronology
New York Calling (1993)	Up, Over & Out (1995)	Full Range (1995)

Up, Over & Out is an album by tenor saxophonist Eric Alexander. It was recorded in 1993 and released by Delmark Records.

== Recording and music ==
The album was recorded in August 1993. The four musicians are tenor saxophonist Eric Alexander, pianist Harold Mabern, bassist John Ore, and drummer Joe Farnsworth.

== Release and reception ==
Professional ratings
Review scores
Source	Rating
AllMusic	4/5 stars
The Penguin Guide to Jazz	3/4 stars

Up, Over & Out was released by Delmark Records. It was Alexander's first album as leader without another horn player present. The AllMusic reviewer wrote that Alexander's "hard bop playing shows that it is quite possible to find an original voice within an older style and sound fresh. This CD is easily recommended to straight-ahead jazz collectors."

== Track listing ==
1. "Up, Over & Out" (Hank Mobley) – 7:54
2. "The Nearness of You" (Hoagy Carmichael, Ned Washington) – 7:27
3. "Eronel" (Thelonious Monk) – 9:44
4. "Bewitched, Bothered and Bewildered" (Lorenz Hart, Richard Rodgers) – 7:35
5. "Flying Fish" (Cecil Payne) – 10:48
6. "Blues for Mabe" (Harold Mabern) – 9:12
7. "I Remember Clifford" (Benny Golson) – 11:40
8. "Ba-Lue Bolivar Ba-Lues-Are" (Monk) – 8:11

== Personnel ==
- Eric Alexander – tenor saxophone
- Harold Mabern – piano
- John Ore – bass
- Joe Farnsworth – drums
