= Straight Street (album) =

Studio album by Harold Mabern
- Released: 1991
- Recorded: December 11, 1989
- Studios: A&R Recording, NYC
- Genre: Jazz
- Label: DIW
- Producer: James Williams

Straight Street is an album by American pianist Harold Mabern. It was recorded in 1989 and released by DIW Records.

== Recording and music ==
The album was recorded in New York in 1989. The personnel are Harold Mabern (piano), Ron Carter (bass), and Jack DeJohnette (drums). The final track is a solo piano piece entitled "Apab and Others", referencing fellow pianists Art Tatum, Phineas Newborn, Ahmad Jamal, and Bud Powell.

== Release and reception ==
Professional ratings
Review scores
Source	Rating
AllMusic	3/5 stars

Straight Street was released by DIW Records. It was distributed in the United States by Columbia Records.

The AllMusic review by Scott Yanow reported that, "The interplay between the musicians is impressive and Mabern is heard throughout in excellent form." The album was a success in Japan and led to a resurgence of interest in Mabern.

== Track listing ==
All compositions by Harold Mabern except where noted

1. "Mr. Stitt"
2. "It's All in the Game" (Charles Dawes)
3. "To Wane"
4. "Afterthoughts" (Richard Koehler)
5. "Straight Street" (John Coltrane)
6. "Don't You Worry 'Bout a Thing" (Stevie Wonder)
7. "Crescent" (John Coltrane)
8. "It's You or No One" (Cahn, Styne)
9. "Seminole"
10. "Apab and Others"

== Personnel ==
- Harold Mabern – piano
- Ron Carter – bass (tracks 1–9)
- Jack DeJohnette – drums (tracks 1–9)
