= Second Impression =

Studio album by Eric Alexander
- Released: 2016
- Recorded: March 14, 2016
- Studio: Trading 8s Recording Studio, Paramus, New Jersey
- Genre: Jazz
- Label: HighNote
- Producer: Eric Alexander

Second Impression is an album by tenor saxophonist Eric Alexander. It was recorded in 2016 and released by HighNote Records in the same year.

== Recording and music ==
The album was recorded at the Trading 8s Recording Studio, Paramus, New Jersey, on March 14, 2016. The quartet are tenor saxophonist Eric Alexander, pianist Harold Mabern, bassist Bob Cranshaw, and drummer Joe Farnsworth. This was probably Cranshaw's final recording session. Alexander also produced the album.

== Release and reception ==
Professional ratings
Review scores
Source	Rating
Down Beat	4.5/5 stars

Second Impression was released by HighNote Records in 2016. The JazzTimes reviewer praised Cranshaw's timing and sense of melody, and commented of Alexander that "the always-reliable leader is particularly inspired".

== Track listing ==
All compositions by Eric Alexander except as indicated

1. "Second Impression" - 6:20
2. "So Many Stars" (Sergio Mendes, Alan Bergman, Marilyn Bergman) - 5:43
3. "Blues for Mo" - 5:17
4. "Jennie's Dance" (Joe Farnsworth) - 5:54
5. "Secret Love" (Sammy Fain, Paul Francis Webster) - 7:31
6. "T-Bone Steak" (Jimmy Smith) - 6:06
7. "Frenzy" - 6:00
8. "Everything Happens to Me" (Matt Dennis, Tom Adair) - 6:34
9. "Full House" (Wes Montgomery) - 5:21

== Personnel ==
- Eric Alexander – tenor saxophone
- Harold Mabern – piano, Fender Rhodes (tracks 4–5, 9)
- Bob Cranshaw – bass
- Joe Farnsworth – drums
