= Joe Farnsworth =

American jazz drummer (born 1968)

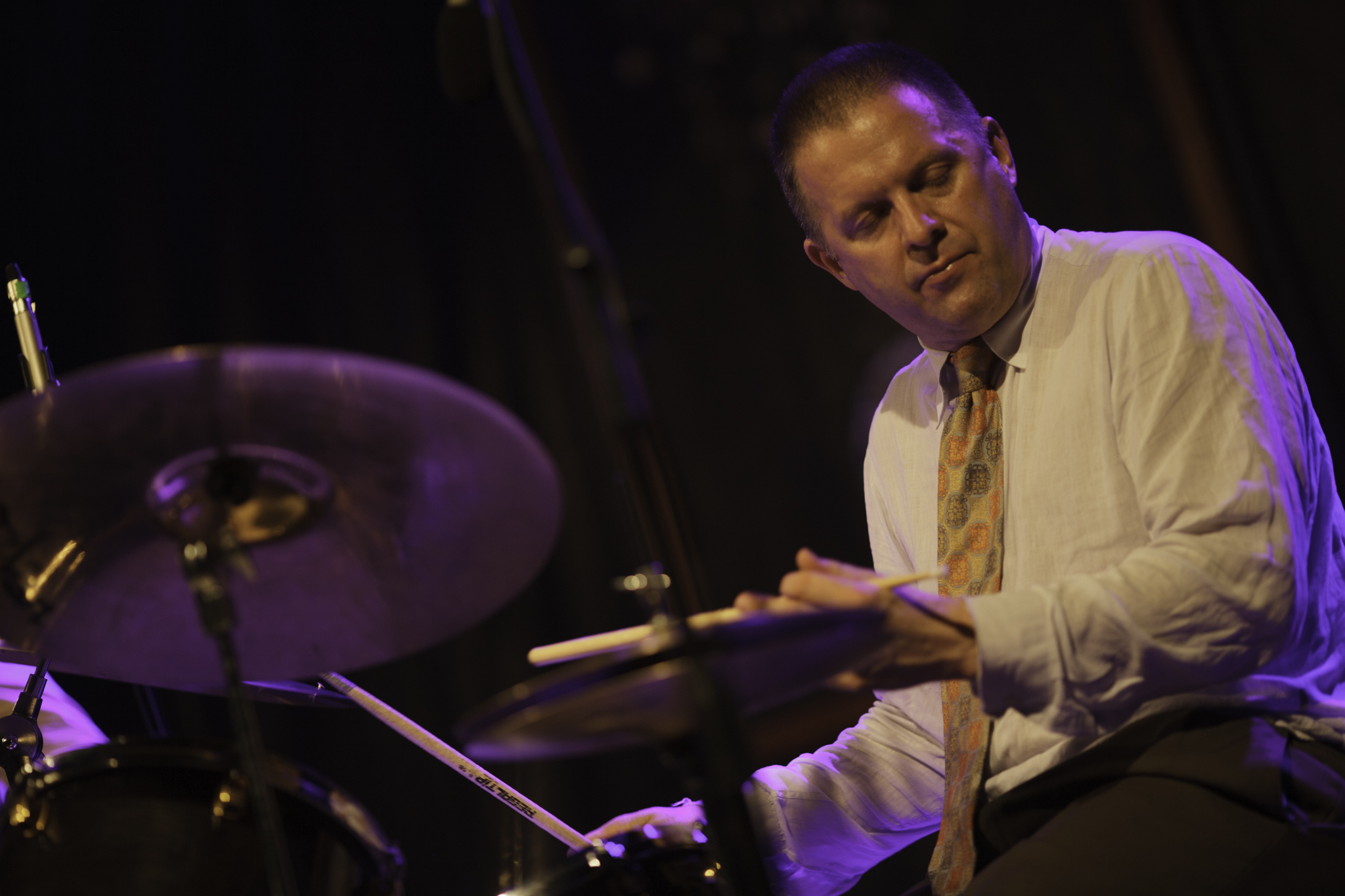
Farnsworth in 2013

Joseph Allen Farnsworth (born February 21, 1968, in South Hadley, Massachusetts) is an American jazz drummer.

Farnsworth was the youngest of five sons born to Roger Farnsworth, a well-known music teacher, trumpeter, and bandleader. His father introduced all of his sons to music of all kinds, but particularly jazz. His brothers included: John (eldest, trombone and saxophone), James (saxophone), Paul, and David (drums). His brother James played baritone saxophone in Ray Charles's band from 1992 until his death in 1999, while his brother John is a professional jazz saxophonist.

He attended South Hadley High School, Massachusetts, then William Paterson College, where he studied under Harold Mabern and drummers Art Taylor and Alan Dawson. He received his BMus in 1990.

Following this, he moved to New York City in the early 1990s and played with Junior Cook (1991), Jon Hendricks (1991), Jon Faddis (1992), George Coleman, Cecil Payne (1993 and subsequently), Annie Ross, and Benny Green (1995). He has played in the group One for All since 1995 with David Hazeltine and Jim Rotondi, and worked with Benny Golson, Steve Davis, and Eric Alexander in the second half of the 1990s. During that period he also played with Alex Graham (1995), Michael Weiss (1996, 1998), the Three Baritone Saxophone Band (1997), and Diana Krall (1999-2000). He was a member of Pharoah Sanders' band.

In July 2025, Farnsworth released the album The Big Room which spent one week at #1 on the JazzWeek chart for jazz radio play.

== Discography ==
=== As leader ===
- Beautiful Friendship (Criss Cross, 1999)
- It's Prime Time (Eighty-Eight's, 2003)
- Super Prime Time (Eighty-Eight's, 2012)
- My Heroes (Venus, 2014)
- Time to Swing (Smoke Sessions, 2020)
- City of Sounds (Smoke Sessions, 2021)
- In What Direction Are You Headed? (Smoke Sessions, 2023)
- The Big Room (Smoke Sessions, 2025)

=== As sideman ===
With Eric Alexander

- Up, Over & Out (Delmark 1993)
- Alexander the Great (HighNote, 1997 [2000])
- Live at the Keynote (Video Arts, 1999)
- The First Milestone (Milestone, 1999)
- The Second Milestone (Milestone, 2000)
- Summit Meeting (Milestone, 2001)
- Nightlife in Tokyo (Milestone, 2002)
- Dead Center (HighNote, 2004)
- Sunday in New York (Venus, 2005)
- It's All in the Game (HighNote, 2005)
- Temple of Olympic Zeus (HighNote, 2007)
- Revival of the Fittest (HighNote 2009)
- Chim Chim Cheree (Venus, 2009)
- Don't Follow the Crowd (HighNote, 2010)
- Touching (HighNote, 2012)
- Chicago Fire (HighNote, 2013)
- The Real Thing (HighNote, 2015)
- Second Impression (HighNote, 2016)

With Junior Cook

- You Leave Me Breathless (SteepleChase, 1991)

With Steve Davis

- Dig Deep (Criss Cross, 1996)
- Crossfire (Criss Cross, 1997)
- Vibe Up (Criss Cross, 1998)
- Portrait in Sound (Stretch, 2000)
- Systems Blue (Criss Cross, 2001)
- Update (Criss Cross, 2006)
- Eloquence (JLP, 2009)
- Say When (Smoke Sessions, 2015)

With Benny Golson

- Tenor Legacy (Arkadia Jazz, 1996 [1998])
- Remembering Clifford (Milestone, 1998)
- One Day, Forever (Arkadia Jazz, 1996 [2001])

With Vincent Herring

- The Uptown Shuffle (Smoke Sessions, 2013)

With Mike LeDonne

- Smokin' Out Loud (Savant, 2004)
- Night Song (Savant, 2005)

With Brian Lynch

- Brian Lynch Meets Bill Charlap (Sharp Nine, 2004)

With Harold Mabern

- Don't Know Why (Venus, 2003)
- Mr. Lucky (HighNote, 2012)
- Live at Smalls (Smalls Live)
- Right on Time (Smoke Sessions)
- Afro Blue (Smoke Sessions)
- The Iron Man: Live at Smoke (Smoke Sessions, 2018)
- Mabern Plays Mabern (Smoke Sessions, 2018)
- Mabern Plays Coltrane (Smoke Sessions, 2018)

With Cecil Payne

- Cerupa (Delmark, 1993 [1995])
- Scotch and Milk (Delmark, 1997)
- Payne's Window (Delmark, 1999)

With Pharoah Sanders

- The Creator Has a Master Plan (Venus, 2003)

With Jesse van Ruller

- Here and There (Criss Cross, 2002)

With Cedar Walton

- One Flight Down (HighNote, 2006)

With Michael Weiss

- Power Station (DIW, 1997)
- Milestones (SteepleChase, 1999)
- Soul Journey (Sintra, 2003)
