= Mode for Mabes =

1997 album by Eric Alexander

Studio album by Eric Alexander with Harold Mabern
- Released: 1998
- Recorded: May 20–21, 1997
- Studio: Riverside Studio, Chicago
- Genre: Jazz
- Label: Delmark

Mode for Mabes is an album by tenor saxophonist Eric Alexander. It was recorded in 1997 and released by Delmark Records.

== Recording and music ==
The album was recorded in May 1997. The sextet contains tenor saxophonist Eric Alexander, trumpeter Jim Rotondi, trombonist Steve Davis, pianist Harold Mabern, bassist John Webber, and drummer George Fludas.

== Release and reception ==
Professional ratings
Review scores
Source	Rating
AllMusic	4.5/5 stars
The Penguin Guide to Jazz	3/4 stars

Mode for Mabes was released by Delmark Records. The AllMusic reviewer described it as "modern mainstream post-to-hard bop at its finest".

== Track listing ==
1. "Mode for Mabes" – 8:39
2. "Sugar Ray" – 8:02
3. "For Heaven's Sake" – 10:07
4. "Erik the Red" – 8:49
5. "Love Thy Neighbor" – 8:33
6. "Stay Straight" – 6:16
7. "Stairway to the Stars" – 8:40
8. "Naima" – 11:17

== Personnel ==
- Eric Alexander – tenor saxophone
- Jim Rotondi – trumpet
- Steve Davis – trombone
- Harold Mabern – piano
- John Webber – bass
- George Fludas – drums
