= Don't Follow the Crowd =

Studio album by Eric Alexander
- Released: 2011
- Recorded: November 4, 2010
- Studio: Van Gelder Studio, Englewood Cliffs, New Jersey
- Genre: Jazz
- Label: HighNote
- Producer: Don Sickler

Don't Follow the Crowd is an album by tenor saxophonist Eric Alexander. It was recorded in 2010 and released by HighNote Records the following year.

== Recording and music ==
The album was recorded at the Van Gelder Studio, Englewood Cliffs, New Jersey, on November 4, 2010. The producer was Don Sickler. The quartet are tenor saxophonist Eric Alexander, pianist Harold Mabern, bassist Nat Reeves, and drummer Joe Farnsworth. "Cavatina" is from the film The Deer Hunter. The Alexander composition "Nomor Senterbress" is a scalar modal piece.

== Release and reception ==
Professional ratings
Review scores
Source	Rating
AllMusic	4.5/5 stars

Don't Follow the Crowd was released by HighNote Records in 2011. The JazzTimes reviewer concluded that Alexander "appears to have entered a more discerning phase – with no lapse in jazz integrity."

== Track listing ==
1. "Nomor Senterbress"
2. "She's Out of My Life"
3. "Footsteps"
4. "Charade"
5. "Don't Misunderstand"
6. "Remix Blues"
7. "Don't Follow the Crowd"
8. "Cavatina"

== Personnel ==
- Eric Alexander – tenor saxophone
- Harold Mabern – piano
- Nat Reeves – bass
- Joe Farnsworth – drums
