= HighNote Records =

American record label

- Founded: 1997
- Founder: Barney Fields; Joe Fields
- Genre: Jazz
- Country of origin: United States
- Location: New York City
- Official website: www.jazzdepot.com

HighNote Records is a jazz record company and label founded by Joe Fields with his son, Barney Fields, in 1997.

Joe Fields worked for Prestige Records in the 1960s, and in the 1970s founded Muse Records. After he sold Muse, he started the HighNote and Savant labels with his son, Barney. Many of the artists on HighNote previously recorded for Muse.

The catalogue includes Cindy Blackman, Larry Coryell, Joey DeFrancesco, Charles Earland, Russell Gunn, Etta Jones, Sheila Jordan, Houston Person, and Jimmy Ponder.

== Discography ==
=== HighNote Records ===
Catalog No. (HCD/HLP)	Artist	Album	Released
7001	Carlos Garnett	Fuego en Mi Alma (Fire in My Soul)	1997
7002	Teddy Edwards and Houston Person	Close Encounters	1997
7003	Russell Gunn	Gunn Fu	1997
7004	Houston Person	Person-ified	1997
7005	Etta Jones	The Melody Lingers On	1997
7006	James Spaulding	The Smile of the Snake	1997
7007	Randy Johnston	Somewhere in the Night	1997
7008	Dakota Staton	A Packet of Love Letters	1997
7009	Wesla Whitfield	Teach Me Tonight	1997
7010	Charles Earland	Blowing the Blues Away	1997
7011	Teddy Edwards	Midnight Creeper	1997
7012	Wesla Whitfield	My Shining Hour	1997
7013	Eric Alexander	Alexander the Great	2000 – recorded in 1997
7014	Charles Earland	Cookin' with the Mighty Burner	1997
7015	Gloria Lynne	This One's on Me	1998
7016	Santi Debriano	Circlechant	1999
7017	Jimmy Ponder	James Street	1997
7018	Ernie Andrews	The Many Faces of Ernie Andrews	1998
7019	John Hicks	Something to Live For: A Billy Strayhorn Songbook	1998
7020	Russell Gunn	Love Requiem	1999
7021	Joey DeFrancesco and "Papa" John DeFrancesco	All in the Family	1998
7022	Red Holloway	In the Red	1998
7023	Carlos Garnett	Under Nubian Skies	1999
7024	Cindy Blackman	In the Now	1998
7025	Wesla Whitfield	High Standards	1998
7026	Etta Jones	My Buddy: Etta Jones Sings the Songs of Buddy Johnson	1998
7027	Randy Johnston	Detour Ahead	2001
7028	Larry Coryell	Monk, Trane, Miles & Me	1999
7029	Sheila Jordan with the Steve Kuhn Trio	Jazz Child	1999
7030	Art Tatum	God Is in the House	1998 – reissue of 1973 Onyx LP of 1940–41 recordings
7031	Hot Lips Page	After Hours in Harlem	1998 – reissue of 1973 Onyx LP of 1940–41 recordings
7032	Joey DeFrancesco	The Champ: Dedicated to Jimmy Smith	1999
7033	Houston Person	My Romance	1998
7034	Jimmy Ponder	Guitar Christmas	1998
7035	John Hicks	Nightwind: An Erroll Garner Songbook	1999
7036	David "Fathead" Newman	Chillin'	1999
7037	Charles Earland	Stomp!	2000
7038	Cindy Blackman	Works on Canvas	2000
7039	James Spaulding	Escapade	2000
7040	Wesla Whitfield	With a Song in My Heart	1999
7041	Jimmy Ponder	Ain't Misbehavin'	2000
7042	Sheila Jordan and Cameron Brown	I've Grown Accustomed to the Bass	2000
7044	Don Byas	Midnight at Minton's	1999 – reissue of 1973 Onyx LP of 1941 recordings
7045	Lucky Thompson	Lucky in Paris	1999 – reissue of Symphonium LP of 1959 recordings
7046	John Hicks	Impressions of Mary Lou	2000
7047	Etta Jones	All the Way	1999
7048	Mark Murphy	Some Time Ago	2000
7049	Houston Person	Soft Lights	1999
7050	Joey DeFrancesco	The Philadelphia Connection: A Tribute to Don Patterson	2002
7051	Woody Shaw	Live Volume One	2000 – recorded in 1977
7052	Larry Coryell	New High	2000
7053	Fats Waller	Fine Arabian Stuff	2000 – recorded in 1939
7054	Lester Young	Prez in Europe	2002 – reissue of 1974 Onyx LP of 1958 recordings
7056	Russell Gunn	Smokin Gunn	2000
7057	David "Fathead" Newman	Keep the Spirits Singing	2001
7058	Houston Person and Etta Jones	Together at Christmas	2000
7059	Etta Jones	Easy Living	2000
7060	Houston Person	In a Sentimental Mood	2000
7061	Joey DeFrancesco	The Champ Round 2	2000
7062	Don Sickler Quintet	Reflections	2002
7063	Cindy Blackman	Someday...	2001
7064	Larry Coryell	Inner Urge	2001
7065	Wesla Whitfield	Let's Get Lost: The Songs of Jimmy McHugh	2000
7066	Charlie Ventura and Bill Harris	Live at the Three Deuces	2000 – reissue of 1975/76 Phoenix Jazz LPs of 1947 recordings
7067	Teddy Edwards	Ladies Man	2001
7068	Arnette Cobb featuring Dinah Washington	Cobb and His Mob in Concert	2000 – reissue of 1977 Phoenix Jazz LPs of 1952 recordings
7069	Jimmy Ponder	Alone	2003
7070	Charles Earland Tribute Band	Keepers of the Flame	2002
7071	"Papa" John DeFrancesco	Hip Cake Walk	2001
7072	Houston Person with Ron Carter	Dialogues	2002
7073	Ernie Andrews	Girl Talk	2001
7074	Rusty Bryant	Rusty Rides Again	2001 – reissue of 1980 Phoenix Jazz LP
7075	Coleman Hawkins	Bean and the Boys	2001 – reissue of 1978 Phoenix Jazz LP of 1950–58 recordings
7076	Don Braden	Brighter Days	2001
7077	Mark Murphy	Links	2001
7078	Etta Jones	Etta Jones Sings Lady Day	2001
7079	Chris Connor	Haunted Heart	2001
7080	Jimmy Ponder	Thumbs Up	2001
7081	Cedar Walton	The Promise Land	2001
7082	Charlie Ventura and Bill Harris	Live at the Three Deuces Vol. 2	2002 – reissue of 1976 Phoenix Jazz LP of 1947 recordings
7083	John Hicks	Music in the Key of Clark	2002
7084	Vincent Herring	Simple Pleasure	2001
7085	Carol Sloane	I Never Went Away	2001
7086	David "Fathead" Newman	Davey Blue	2002
7087	Russell Gunn	Blue on the D.L.	2002
7088	Teddy Edwards	Smooth Sailing	2003
7089	Woody Shaw	Live Volume Two	2001 – recorded 1977
7090	Houston Person	Blue Velvet	2001
7091	Wesla Whitfield	The Best Thing for You Would Be Me	2002
7092	Charles Earland	If Only for One Night	2002
7093	Larry Coryell	Cedars of Avalon	2002
7094	Mark Murphy	Lucky to Be Me	2002
7095	Chris Connor	I Walk with Music	2002
7096	Sheila Jordan and the Steve Kuhn Trio with Tom Harrell	Little Song	2003
7097	Mary Lou Williams	Live at the Keystone Corner	2002 – recorded 1977
7098	Randy Johnston	Hit & Run	2002
7099	Cedar Walton	Latin Tinge	2002
7100	Jimmy Ponder	What's New	2005
7101	Houston Person	Sentimental Journey	2002
7102	Woody Shaw	Live Volume Three	2002 – recorded 1977
7103	Ernie Andrews	Jump for Joy	2003
7104	David "Fathead" Newman	The Gift	2003
7105	Joey DeFrancesco	Joey DeFrancesco Plays Sinatra His Way	2004
7106	Vincent Herring	All Too Real	2003
7107	Russell Gunn	Mood Swings	2003
7108	Chris Connor	Everything I Love	2003
7109	Larry Coryell	The Power Trio: Live in Chicago	2003
7110	John Hicks	Fatha's Day: An Earl Hines Songbook	2003
7111	Mark Murphy	Memories of You: Remembering Joe Williams	2003
7112	Chet Baker	Chet Baker Sings, Plays: Live at the Keystone Korner	2003 – recorded 1975
7113	Carol Sloane	Whisper Sweet	2003
7114	Wesla Whitfield	September Songs	2003
7115	Houston Person	Social Call	2003
7116	Wallace Roney	Prototype	2004
7117	Don Braden	The New Hang	2004
7118	Ernestine Anderson	Love Makes the Changes	2003
7119	Cedar Walton	Underground Memoirs	2005
7120	David "Fathead" Newman	Song for the New Man	2004
7121	Vincent Herring	Mr. Wizard	2004
7122	Randy Johnston	Is It You?	2005
7123	Buster Williams	Griot Libertè	2004
7124	Etta Jones	Always in Our Hearts	2004 – compilation
7125	Freddy Cole	I'm Not My Brother, I'm Me	2004
7126	Mark Murphy	Bop for Miles	2004
7127	Houston Person	To Etta with Love	2004
7128	Charles Earland	The Mighty Burner: The Best of His HighNote Recordings	2004 – compilation
7129	Frank Morgan	City Nights: Live at the Jazz Standard	2004 – recorded 2003
7130	Steve Turre	The Spirits Up Above	2004
7131	Eric Alexander	Dead Center	2004
7132	Wesla Whitfield	In My Life	2005
7134	Houston Person with Bill Charlap	You Taught My Heart to Sing	2006
7135	David "Fathead" Newman	I Remember Brother Ray	2005
7136	Sheila Jordan and Cameron Brown	Celebration	2005
7137	Eric Alexander and Vincent Herring	The Battle	2005
7138	Sonny Stitt	Work Done	2005 – recorded 1976
7139	Woody Shaw	Live Volume Four	2005 – recorded 1981
7140	Freddy Cole	This Love of Mine	2005
7141	Dave Valentin	World on a String	2005
7142	John Hicks	Sweet Love of Mine	2006
7143	Frank Morgan	Raising the Standard	2005 – recorded 2003
7144	Larry Willis	The Big Push	2006
7145	Wallace Roney	Mystikal	2005
7146	Houston Person	All Soul	2005
7147	Joel Harrison	Harrison on Harrison	2005
7148	Eric Alexander	It's All in the Game	2006
7149	Vincent Herring	Ends and Means	2005
7150	David "Fathead" Newman	Cityscape	2006
7151	Ernie Andrews featuring Houston Person	How About Me	2006
7152	Wesla Whitfield	Livin' on Love	2006
7154	Frank Morgan	Reflections	2006
7155	Don Braden	Workin'	2006
7156	Freddy Cole	Because of You: Freddy Cole Sings Tony Bennett	2006
7157	Cedar Walton	One Flight Down	2006
7158	Billy Hart	Billy Hart Quartet	2006
7159	Steve Turre	Keep Searchin'	2006
7160	Dave Valentin	Come Fly with Me	2006
7161	Russell Gunn	Russel Gunn Plays Miles	2007
7162	Gloria Lynne	From My Heart to Yours	2007
7163	Larry Willis	Blue Fable	2007
7164	Frank Morgan	A Night in the Life	2007 – recorded 2003
7165	Jimmy Ponder	Somebody's Child	2007
7166	David "Fathead" Newman	Life	2007
7167	Joel Harrison	Harbor	2007
7168	Freddy Cole with the Bill Charlap Trio	Music Maestro	2007
7169	Jaki Byard	Sunshine of My Soul: Live at the Keystone Korner	2007 – recorded 1978
7170	Zoot Sims	Zoot Suite	2007 – recorded 1973
7171	Tom Harrell	Light On	2007
7172	Eric Alexander	Temple of Olympic Zeus	2007
7173	Etta Jones with Houston Person	Don't Misunderstand: Live in New York	2007 – recorded 1980
7174	Wallace Roney	Jazz	2007
7175	Steve Nelson	Sound-Effect	2007
7176	Various Artists	Funky Pieces of Silver: The Horace Silver Songbook	2007 – compilation of tracks recorded 1997–2006
7177	Houston Person	Thinking of You	2007
7178	Larry Willis	The Offering	2008
7179	David "Fathead" Newman	Diamondhead	2008
7180	Mary Lou Williams	A Grand Night for Swinging	2008 – recorded in 1976
7181	Steve Turre	Rainbow People	2008
7182	George Cables	Morning Song	2008 – recorded in 1980
7183	Russell Gunn	Love Stories	2008
7185	Cedar Walton	Seasoned Wood	2008
7186	Don Braden	Gentle Storm	2008
7187	Ernestine Anderson	A Song for You	2009
7188	Houston Person with Ron Carter	Just Between Friends	2008
7189	Various Artists	Early Trane: The John Coltrane Songbook	2008 – compilation of tracks recorded 1997–2006
7190	Joey DeFrancesco	Joey D	2008
7191	John Hicks	I Remember You	2009 – recorded 2006
7192	Tom Harrell	Prana Dance	2009
7193	Kenny Burrell	Prime: Live at the Downtown Room	2009 – recorded in 1976 and 2006
7194	Joel Harrison	Urban Myths	2009
7195	David "Fathead" Newman	The Blessing	2009
7196	Jimmy Rushing, Zoot Sims and Al Cohn	The Scene: Live in New York	2009 – recorded between 1965 and 1970
7197	Etta Jones and Houston Person	The Way We Were: Live in Concert	2009 recorded in 2000
7198	Freddy Cole	The Dreamer in Me	2009
7199	Joey DeFrancesco	Snapshot	2009
7200	Houston Person	The Art and Soul of Houston Person	2008 – 3CD compilation
7201	Eric Alexander Quartet	Prime Time: In Concert	2008 – CD + DVD
7202	Wallace Roney	If Only for One Night	2010
7203	Jeremy Pelt	Men of Honor	2010
7204	Cedar Walton	Voices Deep Within	2009
7205	Eric Alexander	Revival of the Fittest	2009
7206	Houston Person	Mellow	2009
7207	Tom Harrell	Roman Nights	2010
7208	Kenny Burrell	Be Yourself: Live at Dizzy's Club Coca-Cola	2010 – recorded 2008
7209	John Hicks and Frank Morgan	Twogether	2010
7210	Steve Turre	Delicious and Delightful	2010
7211	Larry Coryell	Prime Picks: The Virtuoso Guitar of Larry Coryell	2010 – compilation
7212	Mary Stallings	Dream	2010
7213	Ernestine Anderson	Nightlife	2011
7124	Freddy Cole	Freddy Cole Sings Mr. B	2010
7125	Joey DeFrancesco	Never Can Say Goodbye: The Music of Michael Jackson	2010
7216	Jeremy Pelt	The Talented Mr. Pelt	2011
7217	Houston Person	Moment to Moment	2010
7218	Wallace Roney	Home	2012
7219	Jaki Byard	A Matter of Black and White	2011 – recorded 1978–79
7220	Eric Alexander	Don't Follow the Crowd	2011
7221	Dave Valentin	Pure Imagination	2011
7222	Tom Harrell	The Time of the Sun	2011
7223	Cedar Walton	The Bouncer	2011
7224	Mary Stallings	Don't Look Back	2012
7225	Freddy Cole	Talk to Me	2011
7226	Joey DeFrancesco	40	2011
7227	Kenny Burrell	Tenderly	2011
7228	Steve Turre	Woody's Delight	2012
7229	Houston Person	So Nice	2011
7230	David "Fathead" Newman	The Soulful Mr. Newman	2011 – 3CD compilation
7231	Pat Martino Quartet	Undeniable: Live at Blues Alley	2011 – recorded 2009
7232	Eric Alexander and Vincent Herring	Friendly Fire: Live at Smoke	2012
7233	Jeremy Pelt	Soul	2012
7234	Sheila Jordan and Harvie S	Yesterdays	2012 – recorded 1990
7235	Wallace Roney	Understanding	2013
7236	Tom Harrell	Number Five	2012
7237	Harold Mabern	Mr. Lucky	2012
7238	Larry Willis	This Time the Dream's on Me	2012
7239	LaVerne Butler	Love Lost and Found Again	2012
7240	Charles Earland	Scorched, Seared & Smokin'	2011 – 3CD compilation
7241	Joey DeFrancesco	Wonderful! Wonderful!	2012
7242	Pat Martino with Bobby Rose	Alone Together	2012 – recorded 1977–78
7243	Woody Shaw	Woody Plays Woody	2012 – compilation from live albums
7244	George Cables	My Muse	2012
7245	Houston Person	Naturally	2012
7246	Freddy Cole	This and That	2013
7247	Jeremy Pelt	Water and Earth	2013
7248	Eric Alexander	Touching	2013
7249	Ethan Iverson, Lee Konitz, Larry Grenadier and Jorge Rossy	Costumes Are Mandatory	2013
7250	Mary Stallings	But Beautiful	2013
7251	Steve Turre	The Bones of Art	2013
7252	Kenny Burrell	Special Requests (and Other Favorites)	2013
7253	Andy Bey	The World According to Andy Bey	2013
7254	Tom Harrell	Colors of a Dream	2013
7255	George Cables	Icons & Influences	2014
7256	Joey DeFrancesco	One for Rudy	2013
7257	Houston Person	Nice 'n' Easy	2013
7258	Gene Ludwig-Pat Martino Trio	Young Guns	2013 – recorded 1968–69
7259	Jeremy Pelt	Face Forward, Jeremy	2014
7260	Various Artists	The Beatles: A Jazz Tribute – Celebrating 50 Years	2014 – compilation
7261	Tom Harrell	Trip	2014
7262	Eric Alexander	Chicago Fire	2014
7263	Dena DeRose	We Won't Forget You: An Homage to Shirley Horn	2014
7264	Jaki Byard	The Late Show: An Evening with Jaki Byard	2014 – recorded 1979
7265	Cedar Walton featuring Freddie Hubbard	Reliving the Moment	2014 – recorded 1977–78
7266	Andy Bey	Pages from an Imaginary Life	2014
7267	Freddy Cole	Singing the Blues	2014
7268	Russell Malone	Love Looks Good on You	2015
7269	Houston Person	The Melody Lingers On	2014
7270	Jeremy Pelt	Tales, Musings and Other Reveries	2015
7271	Cyrus Chestnut	A Million Colors in Your Mind	2015
7272	Mary Stallings	Feelin' Good	2015
7273	Ernestine Anderson	Ernestine Anderson Swings the Penthouse	2015
7274	Pat Martino with Jim Ridl	Nexus	2015 – recorded mid-1990s
7275	George Cables	In Good Company	2015
7276	Tom Harrell	First Impressions	2015
7278	Eric Alexander	The Real Thing	2015
7279	Dena DeRose	United	2016
7280	Abbey Lincoln	Sophisticated Abbey: Live at the Keystone Korner	2015 – recorded 1980
7281	Joey DeFrancesco	Trip Mode	2015
7282	Houston Person	Something Personal	2015
7283	Cyrus Chestnut	Natural Essence	2016
7284	Kenny Burrell	The Road to Love	2015
7285	Jeremy Pelt	#Jiveculture	2016
7286	Freddy Cole	He Was the King	2016
7287	Russell Malone	All About Melody	2016
7288	Benny Golson	Horizon Ahead	2016
7289	Tom Harrell	Something Gold, Something Blue	2016
7290	The Power Quintet	High Art	2016
7291	Woody Shaw and Louis Hayes	The Tour Volume One	2016 – recorded 1976
7292	George Cables	The George Cables Songbook	2016
7293	Houston Person and Ron Carter	Chemistry	2016
7294	Steve Nelson	Brothers Under the Sun	2017
7295	Wallace Roney	A Place in Time	2016
7296	Eric Alexander	Second Impression	2016
7297	Abbey Lincoln	Love Having You Around: Live at the Keystone Korner Vol. 2	2016 – recorded 1980
7298	Kenny Burrell and the Los Angeles Jazz Orchestra Unlimited	Unlimited 1	2016
7299	Jeremy Pelt	Make Noise!	2017
7301	Tom Harrell	Moving Picture	2017
7302	Charlie Sepúlveda & the Turnaround	Mr. EP: A Tribute to Eddie Palmieri	2017
7303	Cedar Walton	Charmed Circle	2017 – recorded 1979
7304	Cyrus Chestnut	There's a Sweet, Sweet Spirit	2017
7305	Russell Malone	Time for the Dancers	2017
7306	Azar Lawrence	Elementals	2018
7307	Pat Martino	Formidable	2017
7308	Woody Shaw and Louis Hayes	The Tour Volume Two	2017 – recorded 1976–77
7309	Houston Person	Rain or Shine	2017
7310	Mark Murphy	Wild and Free	2017
7311	Eric Alexander	Song of No Regrets	2017
7312	Freddy Cole	My Mood Is You	2018
7313	Black Art Jazz Collective	Armor of Pride	2018
7314	Jeremy Pelt	Noir en Rouge: Live in Paris	2018
7315	Houston Person and Ron Carter	Remember Love	2018
7316	Charlie Sepúlveda & the Turnaround	Songs for Nat	2018
7317	Cyrus Chestnut	Kaleidoscope	2018
7318	Wallace Roney	Blue Dawn-Blue Nights	2019
7319	Joel Harrison	Angel Band	2018
7320	Frank Morgan and George Cables	Montreal Memories	2018 – recorded 1989
7321	Tom Harrell	Infinity	2019
7322	George Cables	I'm All Smiles	2019
7325	Jeremy Pelt	The Artist	2019
7327	Houston Person	I'm Just a Lucky So and So	2019
7328	David Kikoski	Phoenix Rising	2019
7330	Eric Alexander	Eric Alexander with Strings	2020
7334	Jeremy Pelt	The Art of Intimacy Vol. 1	2020
7346	Jeremy Pelt	Soundtrack	2022
7351	Jeremy Pelt	The Art of Intimacy Vol. 2	2023
7358	Jeremy Pelt	Tomorrow is another day	2024

=== Savant Records ===
Catalog No. (SCD)	Artist	Album	Released
2001	Della Griffin	The Very Thought of You	1998
2002	Fernando Tarrés featuring Danilo Pérez	The Outsider	1997
2003	Quartette Indigo	Afrika! Afrika!	1997
2004	Bruce Williams	Brotherhood	1998
2005	Houston Person	The Opening Round	1997
2006	Tricia Tahara	Secrets	1998
2007	Irene Reid	Million Dollar Secret	1997
2008	Charles Earland	Slammin' & Jammin'	1998
2009	Bill Heid	Bop Rascal	1999
2010	Richard Carr and Bucky Pizzarelli	String Thing	1999
2011	Carlos Garnett	Moon Shadow	2001
2012	Irene Reid	I Ain't Doing Too Bad	1999
2013	Winard Harper	Trap Dancer	1999
2014	Everett Greene	My Foolish Heart	2000
2015	Peter Martin Weiss	Bass Hits	1999
2016	Mel Rhyne	Remembering Wes	1999
2017	Bob DeVos	Breaking the Ice	1999
2018	Bill Heid	Wet Streets	1999
2019	Lonnie Plaxico	Emergence	2000
2020	Stan Hope	Pastels	1999
2021	Winard Harper Sextet	Winard	1999
2022	Irene Reid	The Uptown Lowdown	2000
2023	Cecil Brooks III	For Those Who Love to Groove	1999
2024	Arthur Blythe Trio	Spirits in the Field	2000
2025	Bruce Williams	Altoicity	2000
2028	Irene Reid	One Monkey Don't Stop No Show	2002
2029	Norman Simmons	The Art of Norman Simmons	2000
2030	Winard Harper Sextet	Faith	2000
2031	Richard Wyands	As Long as There's Music	2001
2032	Irene Reid	Movin' Out	2003
2033	Bill Heid	Dark Secrets	2000
2034	Cecil Brooks III	Live at Sweet Basil	2001
2035	George Freeman	At Long Last George	2001
2036	Arthur Blythe	Blythe Byte	2001
2037	Santi Debriano	Artistic License	2001
2038	Jack Walrath	Invasion of the Booty Shakers	2002
2039	Cecil Brooks III	Live at Sweet Basil Vol. 2	2001
2040	Irene Reid	Thanks to You	2004
2041	Bill Heid	Da Girl	2002
2042	Eric Reed	From My Heart	2002
2043	Norman Simmons	Synthesis	2002
2044	Arthur Blythe	Focus	2002
2046	"Papa" John DeFrancesco	Jumpin'	2003
2048	Winard Harper Sextet	A Time for the Soul	2003
2049	Melvin Sparks Band	What You Hear Is What You Get	2003
2050	Arthur Blythe	Exhale	2003
2051	Eric Reed and the Quintet	E-bop	2003 – recorded 2000
2052	Eddie "Cleanhead" Vinson	Redux: Live at the Keystone Korner	2003 – recorded 1979
2053	Jim Payne	Sensei	2003
2054	Rodney Jones	Soul Manifesto Live!	2003
2055	Mike LeDonne	Smokin' Out Loud	2004
2056	Norman Simmons	In Private	2004
2057	Melvin Sparks	It Is What It Is	2004
2058	Winard Harper	Come Into the Light	2004
2059	Ray Mantilla	Man Ti Ya	2004
2060	"Papa" John DeFrancesco	Walking Uptown	2004
2061	Jim Payne	Energie	2005
2062	Curtis Fuller	Keep It Simple	2005
2063	Stan Hope	Put On a Happy Face	2005
2064	Reuben Wilson	Fun House	2005
2065	Melvin Sparks	This Is It!	2005
2066	Sammy Figueroa and His Latin Jazz Explosion	...and Sammy Walked In	2005
2067	Mike LeDonne	Night Song	2005
2068	Rodney Jones	Dreams and Stories	2005
2069	Joe Chambers	The Outlaw	2006
2070	Melvin Sparks	Groove On Up	2006
2071	Pamela Luss	There's Something About You Don't Know	2006
2072	Cecil Brooks III	Double Exposure	2006
2073	Ray Mantilla	Good Vibrations	2008
2074	Jerry Bergonzi	Tenor of the Times	2006
2075	"Papa" John DeFrancesco	Desert Heat	2006
2076	Reuben Wilson	Movin' On	2006
2077	Bob DeVos	Shifting Sands	2006
2078	Louis Hayes and the Cannonball Legacy Band	Maximum Firepower	2006
2079	Sammy Figueroa and His Latin Jazz Explosion	The Magician	2007
2080	Mike LeDonne	On Fire: Live at Smoke	2007
2081	Wayne Escoffery	Veneration	2007
2082	The Rodriguez Brothers	Conversations	2007
2083	Pamela Luss	Your Eyes	2007
2085	Jerry Bergonzi	Tenorist	2007
2086	Jim Snidero	Tippin'	2007
2087	Radam Schwartz	Blues Citizens	2009
2088	Bob DeVos	Playing for Keeps	2007
2089	Bill O'Connell with Dave Valentin and Richie Flores	Triple Play	2008
2090	Wayne Escoffery and Veneration	Hopes and Dreams	2008
2091	Mike LeDonne	FiveLive	2008
2092	Harvie S with Kenny Barron	Now Was the Time	2008
2093	Jerry Bergonzi	Tenor Talk	2008
2094	Pamela Luss	Magnet	2008
2095	Denise Donatelli	What Lies Within	2008
2096	John Hicks Legacy Band	Mind Wine – The Music of John Hicks	2008
2097	Cecil Brooks III	Hot Dog	2009
2098	"Papa" John DeFrancesco	Big Shot	2009
2099	Jerry Bergonzi	Simply Put	2009
2100	Mike LeDonne	The Groover	2009
2101	Peter Hand Big Band featuring Houston Person	The Wizard of Jazz: A Tribute to Harold Arlen	2009
2102	Jim Snidero	Crossfire	2009
2103	Pamela Luss with Houston Person	Sweet and Saxy	2009
2104	Eric Reed and Cyrus Chestnut	Plenty Swing, Plenty Soul	2010
2105	Jerry Bergonzi	Three for All	2010
2106	Carolyn Leonhart and Wayne Escoffery	Tides of Yesterday	2010
2107	Joe Chambers	Horace to Max	2010
2108	Eric Reed	The Dancing Monk	2011
2109	Denise Donatelli	When Lights Are Low	2010
2110	Jerry Bergonzi	Convergence	2011
2111	Silvano Monasterios	Unconditional	2011
2112	"Papa" John DeFrancesco	A Philadelphia Story	2011
2113	Jim Snidero	Interface	2011
2114	Mike LeDonne and The Groover Quartet	Keep the Faith	2011
2115	Piero Odorici with the Cedar Walton Trio	Piero Odorici with the Cedar Walton Trio	2012
2116	Giacomo Gates	The Revolution Will Be Jazz:- The Songs of Gil Scott-Heron	2011
2117	Denise Donatelli	Soul Shadows	2012
2118	Eric Reed	The Baddest Monk	2012
2119	Bruce Barth	Three Things of Beauty	2012
2120	Joe Chambers	Joe Chambers Moving Pictures Orchestra	2012
2121	JD Allen Trio	The Matador and the Bull	2012
2123	Jerry Bergonzi	Shifting Gears	2012
2124	Giacomo Gates	Miles Tones	2013
2125	Irene Reid	The Queen of the Party	2012
2126	Harvie S with Kenny Barron	Witchcraft	2013
2127	Jim Snidero	Stream of Consciousness	2013
2128	Barbara Morrison featuring Houston Person	A Sunday Kind of Love	2013
2129	Bill O'Connell and The Latin Jazz All-Stars	Zócalo	2013
2130	JD Allen	Grace	2013
2131	Jerry Bergonzi	By Any Other Name – Tunes Based on Other Tunes	2013
2132	Eric Reed	The Adventurous Monk	2014
2133	Ray Mantilla	The Connection	2013
2134	Bruce Barth	Daybreak	2014
2135	Mike LeDonne and The Groover Quartet	I Love Music	2014
2136	Barbara Morrison featuring Houston Person	I Love You, Yes I Do	2014
2137	Jerry Bergonzi featuring Dick Oatts	Intersecting Lines	2014
2139	JD Allen	Bloom	2014
2140	Joe Chambers	Landscapes	2016
2141	Peter Hand Big Band	Out of Hand	2014
2142	Jim Snidero	Main Street	2015
2144	Sammy Figueroa and Glaucia Nasser	Talisman	2014
2145	Bill O'Connell and The Latin Jazz All-Stars	Imagine	2014
2146	Giacomo Gates	Everything Is Cool	2015
2147	JD Allen	Graffiti	2015
2148	Mike LeDonne and The Groover Quartet	AwwlRIGHT!	2015
2149	Jerry Bergonzi	Rigamaroll	2015
2150	Denise Donatelli	Find a Heart	2015
2151	Sammy Figueroa	Imaginary World	2015
2153	Silvano Monasterios	Partly Sunny	2016
2154	Bill O'Connell and The Latin Jazz All-Stars	Heart Beat	2016
2155	JD Allen	Americana: Musings on Jazz and Blues	2016
2156	Jim Snidero	MD66	2016
2157	Giacomo Gates	What Time Is It?	2017
2158	Jerry Bergonzi	Spotlight on Standards	2016
2159	Mike LeDonne and The Groover Quartet	That Feelin'	2016
2160	Ray Mantilla	High Voltage	2017
2161	Bill O'Connell	Monk's Cha Cha	2017
2162	JD Allen	Radio Flyer	2017
2163	Jerry Bergonzi	Dog Star	2017
2164	Barbara Morrison featuring Houston Person	I Wanna Be Loved	2017
2165	Danny Grissett	Remembrance	2017
2167	Jim Snidero and Jeremy Pelt	Jubilation! Celebrating Cannonball Adderley	2018
2168	Mike LeDonne and The Groover Quartet	From the Heart	2018
2169	JD Allen	Love Stone	2018
2171	Caesar Frazier	Closer to the Truth	2018
2172	Bill O'Connell	Jazz Latin	2018
2173	Pat Bianchi	In the Moment	2018
2174	Mike LeDonne	Partners in Time	2019
2175	Peter Hand Big Band	Hand Painted Dream	2019
2177	JD Allen	Barracoon	2019
2178	Lafayette Harris Jr.	You Can't Lose with the Blues	2019
2179	Bill O'Connell and The Afro Caribbean Ensemble	Wind Off the Hudson	2019
2180	Jerry Bergonzi	Nearly Blue	2020
2182	Monika Herzig	Eternal Dance	2020
2185	Jim Snidero	Project-K	2020

== Sister label ==
- Fedora Records, founded in the late 1990s
