= One Flight Down =

Studio album by Cedar Walton
- Released: August 1, 2006
- Recorded: April 7, 2006
- Studio: Van Gelder Studio, Englewood Cliffs, NJ
- Genre: Jazz
- Length: 55:53
- Label: HighNote; HCD 7157
- Producer: Don Sickler & Cedar Walton

Cedar Walton chronology
Midnight Waltz (2005)	One Flight Down (2006)	Seasoned Wood (2008)

One Flight Down is an album by pianist Cedar Walton which was recorded in 2006 and released on the Highnote label.

== Reception ==
Allmusic reviewed the album stating "Cedar Walton shows no signs of slowing down at age 72, demonstrating both experience and enthusiasm in this invigorating studio session... Highly recommended". All About Jazz observed "His latest release is a typically excellent effort... Straight-ahead jazz piano doesn't get much better than this".

Professional ratings
Review scores
Source	Rating
Allmusic	4.5/5 stars
All About Jazz	4/5 stars
The Penguin Guide to Jazz Recordings	3.5/4 stars

== Track listing ==
All compositions by Cedar Walton except where noted.

1. "One Flight Down" - 5:39
2. "The Rubber Man" - 4:40
3. "Billy Strayhorn Medley: Lush Life" (Billy Strayhorn) - 5:29
4. "Billy Strayhorn Medley: Day Dream" (Strayhorn, Duke Ellington, John La Touche) - 4:39
5. "Billy Strayhorn Medley: Raincheck" (Strayhorn) - 4:09
6. "Seven Minds" (Sam Jones) - 7:04
7. "Time After Time" (Jule Styne, Sammy Cahn) - 7:52
8. "Hammer Head" (Wayne Shorter) - 6:36
9. "Little Sunflower" (Freddie Hubbard) - 9:45

== Personnel ==
=== Musicians ===
- Cedar Walton - piano
- Vincent Herring - tenor saxophone (tracks 1 & 2)
- David Williams - bass
- Joe Farnsworth - drums

=== Production ===
- Don Sickler - producer
- Rudy Van Gelder - engineer
