= Touching (Eric Alexander album) =

Studio album by Eric Alexander
- Released: 2013
- Recorded: October 22, 2012
- Studio: Van Gelder Studio, Englewood Cliffs, New Jersey
- Genre: Jazz
- Label: HighNote
- Producer: Eric Alexander

Touching is an album by tenor saxophonist Eric Alexander. It was recorded in 2012 and released by HighNote Records the following year.

== Recording and music ==
The album was recorded at the Van Gelder Studio, Englewood Cliffs, New Jersey, on October 22, 2012. The quartet are tenor saxophonist Eric Alexander, pianist Harold Mabern, bassist John Webber, and drummer Joe Farnsworth. Alexander also produced the album. The compositions are ballads. "Dinner for One Please, James" is an Alexander–Mabern duet.

== Release and reception ==
Professional ratings
Review scores
Source	Rating
AllMusic	4/5 stars

Touching was released by HighNote Records in 2013. The AllMusic reviewer concluded that, "Ultimately, Touching is a steamy album, with just enough classy restraint to make it a perfect accompaniment for any stylish afterglow."

== Track listing ==
1. "Touching" (Bobby Lyle)
2. "Gone Too Soon" (Larry Grossman, Buz Kohan)
3. "The Way She Makes Me Feel" (Michel Legrand, Alan Bergman, Marilyn Bergman)
4. "Dinner for One Please, James" (Michael Carr)
5. "Central Park West" (John Coltrane)
6. "I'm Glad There Is You" (Jimmy Dorsey, Paul Madeira)
7. "The September of My Years" (Jimmy Van Heusen, Sammy Kahn)
8. "Oh Girl" (Eugene Record)

== Personnel ==
- Eric Alexander – tenor saxophone
- Harold Mabern – piano
- John Webber – bass (tracks 1–3, 5–8)
- Joe Farnsworth – drums (tracks 1–3, 5–8)
