= Live at the Keynote =

1999 album by tenor saxophonist Eric Alexander

Live album by Eric Alexander
- Released: 1999
- Recorded: March 4–5, 1999
- Venue: The Keynote, Harajuku, Tokyo
- Genre: Jazz
- Label: Video Arts

Live at the Keynote is an album by tenor saxophonist Eric Alexander. It was recorded in concert in 1999 and released by Video Arts Music.

== Recording and music ==
The album was recorded at the Keynote, Tokyo, in 1999. The quartet are tenor saxophonist Eric Alexander, pianist Harold Mabern, bassist Nat Reeves, and drummer Joe Farnsworth. "In the Still of the Night" is played uptempo, as is "The Bee Hive".

== Release and reception ==
Professional ratings
Review scores
Source	Rating
AllMusic	4/5 stars

Live at the Keynote was released by Video Arts Music in Japan. The JazzTimes reviewer concluded: "Seventy-three minutes of prime Alexander. Please don't take this cat for granted – he's the real deal."

== Track listing ==
1. "The Bee Hive"
2. "Maybe September"
3. "In the Still of the Night"
4. "Edward Lee"
5. "A Nightingale Sang in Berkeley Square"
6. "Stan's Shuffle"
7. "Alone Together"

== Personnel ==
- Eric Alexander – tenor saxophone
- Harold Mabern – piano
- Nat Reeves – bass
- Joe Farnsworth – drums
