= Revival of the Fittest =

Studio album by Eric Alexander
- Released: 2009
- Recorded: April 14 & 28, 2009
- Studio: Van Gelder Studio
- Genre: Jazz
- Label: HighNote
- Producer: Don Sickler

Revival of the Fittest is an album by tenor saxophonist Eric Alexander. It was recorded in 2009 and released by HighNote Records.

== Recording and music ==
The album was recorded at the Van Gelder Studio. It was produced by Don Sickler. For all but one of the tracks, the four musicians are tenor saxophonist Eric Alexander, pianist Harold Mabern, bassist Nat Reeves, and drummer Joe Farnsworth. These were recorded on April 14, 2009. Fourteen days later, "Yasashiku (Gently)" was recorded; it is a duet by Alexander and pianist Mike LeDonne. Two of the compositions – "Too Late Fall Back Baby" and "Blues for Phineas" – are Mabern compositions that he had recorded on his own albums.

== Release and reception ==
Professional ratings
Review scores
Source	Rating
AllMusic	4/5 stars
Down Beat	4/5 stars

Revival of the Fittest was released by HighNote Records. The AllMusic reviewer concluded that "Revival of the Fittest is yet another example of how rewarding an Alexander album can be when Mabern is on board."

DownBeat reviewer Michael Jackson assigned the album 4 stars. He wrote, "Alexander’s ability to convince with ballads and burners is exceptional, and he is often at his most creative on the outro or cadenza portions of a tune when proscribed harmony isn’t dictating direction".

== Track listing ==
1. "Revival"
2. "My Grown-Up Christmas List"
3. "The Island"
4. "Too Late Fall Back Baby"
5. "Love-Wise"
6. "Blues for Phineas"
7. "You Must Believe in Spring"
8. "Yasashiku (Gently)"

== Personnel ==
- Eric Alexander – tenor saxophone
- Harold Mabern – piano (tracks 1–7)
- Mike LeDonne – piano (track 8)
- Nat Reeves – bass (tracks 1–7)
- Joe Farnsworth – drums (tracks 1–7)
