= Eric Alexander (jazz saxophonist) =

American jazz saxophonist (born 1968)

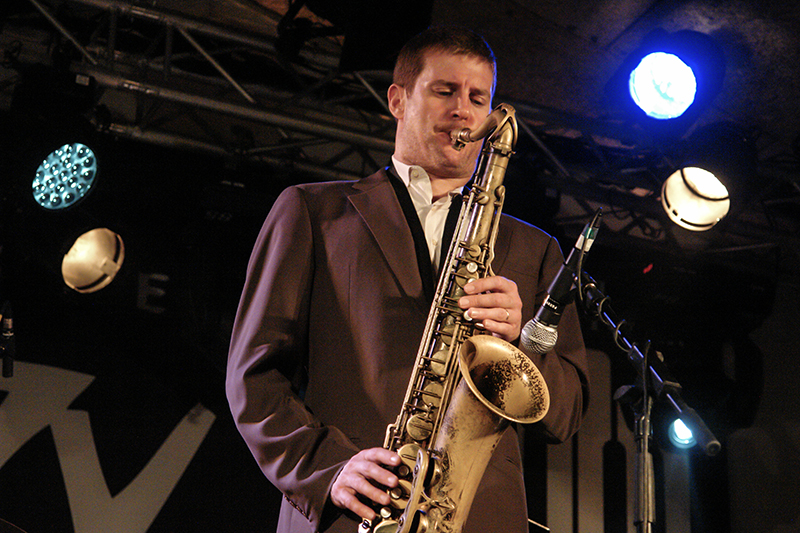
- Alexander in Aarhus, Denmark, 2012

Background information
- Born: August 4, 1968 (age 58); Illinois, U.S.
- Genres: Jazz; bebop; straight-ahead jazz
- Occupations: Musician; educator
- Instrument: Tenor saxophone
- Years active: 1991–present
- Labels: Delmark; Milestone; HighNote; Venus; Cellar
- Website: ericalexanderjazz.com

Eric Alexander (born August 4, 1968) is an American jazz saxophonist, composer, and educator. Having placed second at the 1991 Thelonious Monk International Jazz Saxophone Competition behind Joshua Redman and ahead of Chris Potter and Tim Warfield, he was soon signed by a record label and has since recorded over 20 albums as a leader and over 300 as a sideman.

== Early life and education ==
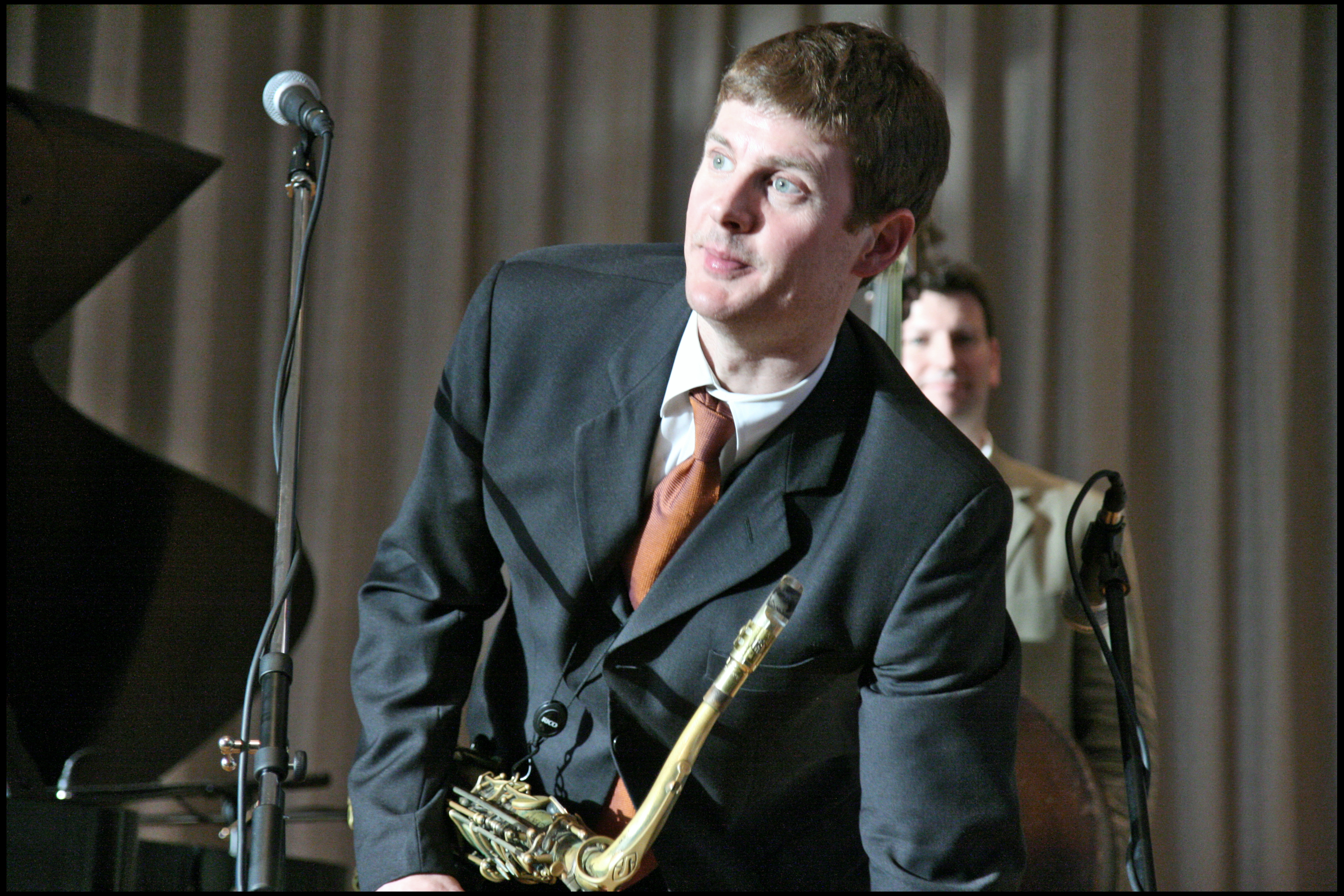
Alexander in 2007

Alexander was born in Illinois. He began as a classical musician, studying alto saxophone at Indiana University with Eugene Rousseau in 1986. He soon switched to jazz and the tenor saxophone, however, and transferred to William Paterson University, where he studied with Harold Mabern, Rufus Reid, Joe Lovano, Gary Smulyan, Norman Simmons, Steve Turre, and others.

== Career ==
Alexander placed second at the 1991 Thelonious Monk International Jazz Saxophone Competition (renamed in 2019 the Herbie Hancock Institute of Jazz International Competition). Later that year, he made his recording debut with Charles Earland and released his debut album on Delmark the following year.

Alexander has worked with many jazz musicians, including the Chicago pianist Harold Mabern, bassist Ron Carter, drummer Idris Muhammad, and guitarist Pat Martino. He is a member of Mike LeDonne's Groover Quartet with Peter Bernstein and Joe Farnsworth, with who he has recorded and toured extensively, as well as with One for All, and The Battle with Vincent Herring.

== Discography ==
=== As leader/co-leader ===
Recording date	Title	Label	Release year	Personnel/Notes
1992–08	Straight Up	Delmark	1993	Quintet, with Jim Rotondi (trumpet), Harold Mabern (piano), John Webber (bass), George Fludas (drums)
1992–12	New York Calling	Criss Cross	1993	Quintet, with John Swana (trumpet/flugelhorn), Richard Wyands (piano), Peter Washington (bass), Kenny Washington (drums)
1993–08	Up, Over & Out	Delmark	1995	Quartet, with Harold Mabern (piano), John Ore (bass), Joe Farnsworth (drums)
1994–01	Full Range	Criss Cross	1995	Sextet, with John Swana (trumpet), Kenny Barron (piano), Peter Bernstein (guitar), Peter Washington (bass), Carl Allen (drums)
1995–05	Eric Alexander in Europe	Criss Cross	1995	Quartet, with Melvin Rhyne (organ), Bobby Broom (guitar), Joe Farnsworth (drums)
1995	Stablemates	Delmark	1996	Co-led Quintet with Lin Halliday (tenor saxophone), with Jodie Christian (piano), Dan Shapera (bass), Wilbur Campbell (drums)
1996–12	Two of a Kind	Criss Cross	1997	Quintet, with Cecil Payne (baritone saxophone), David Hazeltine (piano), John Webber (bass), Joe Farnsworth (drums)
1997–01	Man with a Horn	Milestone	1997	Most tracks quartet, with Cedar Walton (piano), Dwayne Burno (bass), Joe Farnsworth (drums); some tracks sextet, with Jim Rotondi (trumpet), Steve Davis (trombone) added
1997–05	Alexander the Great	HighNote	2000	Quintet, with Jim Rotondi (trumpet), Charles Earland (organ), Peter Bernstein (guitar), Joe Farnsworth (drums) [rel. 2000]
1997–05	Mode for Mabes	Delmark	1998	Sextet, with Jim Rotondi (trumpet), Steve Davis (trombone), Harold Mabern (piano), John Webber (bass), George Fludas (drums)
1997–12	Heavy Hitters	Pony Canyon	1998	Quartet, with Harold Mabern (piano), Peter Washington (bass), Joe Farnsworth (drums)
1998–04, 1998–05	Solid!	Milestone	1998	Most tracks quartet, with John Hicks (piano), George Mraz (bass), Idris Muhammad (drums); some tracks quintet, with Jim Rotondi (trumpet) added; one track quintet, with Joe Locke (vibes) replacing Alexander; one track solo piano by Hicks
1998–11	A Love Story	32 Jazz	2000	Quartet, with Cyrus Chestnut (piano), George Mraz (bass), Lewis Nash (drums); AKA 'The Keystone Quartet'
1998–12	Extra Innings	Alfa Jazz	2000	Quartet, with Harold Mabern (piano), Peter Washington (bass), Joe Farnsworth (drums)
1999–03	Live at the Keynote	Video Arts	1999	Live. Quartet, with Harold Mabern (piano), Nat Reeves (bass), Joe Farnsworth (drums)
1999–11	The First Milestone	Milestone	2000	Quintet, with Pat Martino (guitar), Harold Mabern (piano), Peter Washington (bass), Joe Farnsworth (drums)
2000–12	The Second Milestone	Milestone	2001	Most tracks quartet, with Harold Mabern (piano), Peter Washington (bass), Joe Farnsworth (drums); three tracks quintet, with Jim Rotondi (trumpet) added
2001–12	Groovin' Blues	M & I	2002	Co-led with Junior Mance. With Junior Mance Trio.
2001–12	Summit Meeting	Milestone	2002	Most tracks quartet, with Harold Mabern (piano), John Webber (bass), Joe Farnsworth (drums); four tracks quintet, with Nicholas Payton (trumpet, fluegelhorn) added
2002–12	Nightlife in Tokyo	Milestone	2003	Quartet, with Harold Mabern (piano), Ron Carter (bass), Joe Farnsworth (drums)
2004–03	Gentle Ballads	Venus	2004	Quartet, with Mike LeDonne (piano), John Webber (bass), Joe Farnsworth (drums)
2004–06	Dead Center	HighNote	2004	Quartet, with Harold Mabern (piano), John Webber (bass), Joe Farnsworth (drums)
2005–03	Sunday in New York	Venus	2005	Quartet, with John Hicks (piano), John Webber (bass), Joe Farnsworth (drums)
2005–07	It's All in the Game	HighNote	2006	Quartet, with Harold Mabern (piano), Nat Reeves (bass), Joe Farnsworth (drums)
2006–03	Gentle Ballads II	Venus	2006	Quartet, with Mike LeDonne (piano), John Webber (bass), Joe Farnsworth (drums)
2007–01	Temple of Olympic Zeus	HighNote	2007	Most tracks quartet, with David Hazeltine (piano), Nat Reeves (bass), Joe Farnsworth (drums); some tracks quintet, with Jim Rotondi (trumpet) added
2007–04	In Concert: Prime Time	HighNote	2008	Live. Quartet, with David Hazeltine (piano), John Webber (bass), Joe Farnsworth (drums)
2007–09	My Favorite Things	Venus	2008	Quartet, with David Hazeltine (piano), John Webber (bass), Joe Farnsworth (drums)
2007–11	Gentle Ballads III	Venus	2008	Quartet, with Mike LeDonne (piano), John Webber (bass), Joe Farnsworth (drums)
2008–08	Lazy Afternoon: Gentle Ballads IV	Venus	2009	Quartet, with Mike LeDonne (piano), John Webber (bass), Joe Farnsworth (drums)
2009–04	Revival of the Fittest	HighNote	2009	Most tracks quartet, with Harold Mabern (piano), Nat Reeves (bass), Joe Farnsworth (drums); one track duo, with Mike LeDonne (piano)
2009–10	Chim Chim Cheree	Venus	2010	Quartet, with Harold Mabern (piano), John Webber (bass), Joe Farnsworth (drums)
2010–11	Don't Follow the Crowd	HighNote	2011	Quartet, with Harold Mabern (piano), Nat Reeves (bass), Joe Farnsworth (drums)
2011–03	Gentle Ballads V	Venus	2011	Quartet, with George Cables (piano), Nat Reeves (bass), Joe Farnsworth (drums)
2012–10	Touching	HighNote	2013	Quartet, with Harold Mabern (piano), John Webber (bass), Joe Farnsworth (drums)
2011–12, 2012–01, 2012–08, 2013–03	With Strings	HighNote	2019	Quartet, with David Hazeltine (piano), John Webber (bass), Joe Farnsworth (drums), plus string orchestra (conducted by Dave Rivello)
2013–03	Blues at Midnight	Venus	2013	Quartet, with Harold Mabern (piano), Nat Reeves (bass), Joe Farnsworth (drums)
2013–07	Recado Bossa Nova	Venus	2014	Quartet, with Harold Mabern (piano), Nat Reeves (bass), Joe Farnsworth (drums)
2013–11	Chicago Fire	HighNote	2014	Most tracks quartet, with Harold Mabern (piano), John Webber (bass), Joe Farnsworth (drums); some tracks quintet, with Jeremy Pelt (trumpet) added
2015–04	The Real Thing	HighNote	2015	Most tracks quartet, with Harold Mabern (piano), John Webber (bass), Joe Farnsworth (drums); some tracks quintet, with Pat Martino (guitar) added
2016–03	Second Impression	HighNote	2016	Quartet, with Harold Mabern (piano, Fender Rhodes), Bob Cranshaw (bass), Joe Farnsworth (drums)
2016–09	Just One of Those Things	Venus	2016	Trio, with Dezron Douglas (bass), Neal Smith (drums)
2017–06	Song of No Regrets	HighNote	2017	Most tracks quintet, with David Hazeltine (piano), John Webber (bass), Joe Farnsworth (drums), Alex Diaz (percussion); some tracks sextet, with Jon Faddis (trumpet) added
2018–05, 2018–08	Leap of Faith	Giant Step Arts	2019	Live. Trio, with Doug Weiss (bass), Johnathan Blake (drums)
2021–08, 2021–12	A New Beginning: Alto Saxophone with Strings	HighNote	2023	Quartet, with David Hazeltine (piano), John Webber (bass), Joe Farnsworth (drums), plus string orchestra (conducted by Bill Dobbins)
2023–04	Timing Is Everything	Cellar Music Group	2024	Quartet, with Rick Germanson (piano), Alexander Claffy (bass), Jason Tiemann (drums), plus guests: Jed Paradies- flute (on "Serenade To A Cuckoo"), Rale Micic- guitar (on "Serenade To A Cuckoo"), Alma Micic- voice (on "Evergreen"), Stan Wetering- tenor saxophone (on "Big G's Monk")
2023–07	Together	Cellar Music Group	2024	Co-led Duo with Mike LeDonne (piano)
2024–05	Chicago to New York	Cellar Music Group	2025	Quartet, with Mike LeDonne (piano), Dennis Carroll (bass), George Fludas (drums)
2024–11	Like Sugar	Cellar Music Group	2025	Quartet, with David Hazeltine (piano), Dennis Carroll (bass), George Fludas (drums)

Reeds and Deeds
With Grant Stewart

- Wailin' (Criss Cross, 2004)
- Cookin' (Criss Cross, 2005)
- Tenor Time (Criss Cross, 2010)

=== As a member ===
The Tenor Triangle
With Ralph Lalama and Tad Shull

- Tell It Like It Is (Criss Cross Jazz, 1994)
- Aztec Blues (Criss Cross Jazz, 1997) – rec. 1994

One for All
With Jim Rotondi, Steve Davis, David Hazeltine and Joe Farnsworth

- Too Soon to Tell (Sharp Nine, 1997)
- Optimism (Sharp Nine, 1998)
- Upward and Onward (Criss Cross, 1999)
- The Long Haul (Criss Cross, 2000)
- The End of a Love Affair (Venus, 2001)
- Live at Smoke, Volume 1 (Criss Cross, 2001)
- Wide Horizons (Criss Cross, 2002)
- No Problem: Tribute to Art Blakey (Venus, 2003)
- Blueslike (Criss Cross, 2003)
- Killer Joe (Venus, 2005)
- The Lineup (Sharp Nine, 2006)
- What's Going On (Venus, 2007)
- Return of the Lineup (Sharp Nine, 2008)
- Incorrigible (Jazz Legacy Productions, 2009)
- Invades Vancouver! (Live at The Cellar) (Cellar Live, 2010)
- The Third Decade (Smoke Sessions, 2016)
- Big George (Smoke Sessions, 2024) with guest: George Coleman

Charles Earland Tribute Band
With Joey DeFrancesco, Bob DeVos and Pat Martino

- Keepers of the Flame (A Tribute to Charles Earland) (HighNote, 2002)

New York All-Stars

- Burnin' In London (Ubuntu Music, 2017) – quartet with Harold Mabern
- Live Encounter (Ubuntu Music, 2018) – sextet with Seamus Blake and Mike LeDonne

=== As sideman ===
With Steve Davis

- The Jaunt (Criss Cross Jazz, 1995)
- Dig Deep (Criss Cross Jazz, 1996)
- Crossfire (Criss Cross Jazz, 1997)
- Say When (Smoke Sessions, 2015)

With Bob DeVos

- Shifting Sands (Savant, 2005)
- Playing for Keeps (Savant, 2007)

With Charles Earland

- Unforgettable (Muse, 1991)
- I Ain't Jivin'...I'm Jammin' (Muse, 1992)
- Ready 'n' Able (Muse, 1995)
- Blowing the Blues Away (HighNote, 1997)
- Cookin' with the Mighty Burner (HighNote, 1999) – rec. 1997
- Charles Earland Live (Cannonball, 1999) – rec. 1997
- Stomp! (HighNote, 2000) – rec. 1999

With Joe Farnsworth

- Beautiful Friendship (Criss Cross Jazz, 1999) – rec. 1998
- It's Prime Time (Eighty-Eight's, 2003)
- Super Prime Time (Eighty-Eight's, 2012) – rec. 2011
- My Heroes (Tribute to the Legends) (Venus, 2014)

With David Hazeltine

- Blues Quarters, Vol. 1 (Criss Cross Jazz, 1998)
- The Classic Trio Meets Eric Alexander (Sharp Nine, 2001)
- Manhattan Autumn (Sharp Nine, 2001)
- Blues Quarters, Vol. 2 (Criss Cross Jazz, 2006)
- The Inspiration Suite (Sharp Nine Jazz, 2007)
- Inversions (Criss Cross Jazz, 2010)

With Vincent Herring

- The Battle: Live at Smoke (HighNote, 2005)
- Friendly Fire: Live at Smoke (HighNote, 2012)
- In the Spirit of Coltrane and Cannonball (Yanagisawa, 2012)
- Split Decision (Smoke Sessions, 2025)

With Randy Johnston

- Jubilation (Muse, 1994) – rec. 1992
- In A-Chord (Muse, 1995) – rec. 1994

With Mike LeDonne

- Then & Now (Double-Time, 1999)
- Smokin' Out Loud (Savant, 2004)
- You'll See! (Live at The Cellar) (Cellar Live, 2004)
- On Fire (Live at Smoke) (Savant, 2006)
- Five Live (Live at Smoke) (Savant, 2007)
- The Groover (Savant, 2009)
- Keep the Faith (Savant, 2011) ('The Groover Quartet')
- I Love Music (Savant, 2013) ('The Groover Quartet')
- Awwl Right! (Savant, 2015) ('The Groover Quartet')
- That Feelin' (Savant, 2016) ('The Groover Quartet')
- From the Heart (Savant, 2018) ('The Groover Quartet')
- It's All Your Fault (Savant, 2021) ('The Groover Quartet')
- The Heavy Hitters (Cellar Music Group, 2023)
- Wonderful! (Cellar Music Group, 2024) ('The Groover Quartet')
- That's What's Up! (Cellar Music Group, 2024) ('The Heavy Hitters' sextet with Jeremy Pelt, Vincent Herring)
- Turn It Up! (Live at the Sidedoor) (Cellar Music Group, 2025) ('The Groover Quartet')

With Harold Mabern

- Kiss of Fire (Venus, 2001)
- Mr. Lucky (A Tribute to Sammy Davis Jr.) (HighNote, 2012)
- Afro Blue (Smoke Sessions, 2015)
- To Love and Be Loved (Smoke Sessions, 2017)
- The Iron Man: Live at Smoke (Smoke Sessions, 2018)
- Mabern Plays Mabern (Smoke Sessions, 2020) – rec. 2018
- Mabern Plays Coltrane (Smoke Sessions, 2021) – rec. 2018

With Cecil Payne

- Cerupa (Delmark, 1995) – rec. 1993
- Scotch and Milk (Delmark, 1996)
- Payne's Window (Delmark, 1998)

With Irene Reid

- Million Dollar Secret (Savant, 1997)
- I Ain't Doing Too Bad (Savant, 1999)
- The Uptown Lowdown (Savant, 2000)
- One Monkey Don't Stop No Show (Savant, 2002)

With Jim Rotondi

- Introducing Jim Rotondi (Criss Cross Jazz, 1996)
- Jim's Bop (Criss Cross Jazz, 1997)
- Excursions (Criss Cross Jazz, 1998)
- Blues for Brother Ray (Posi-Tone, 2009)
- Live at Smalls (Smalls Live, 2009)
- Hard Hittin' at the Bird's Eye (Sharp Nine, 2012)

With Jimmy Scott

- But Beautiful (Milestone, 2001)
- Moon Glow (Milestone, 2001)

With Michael Weiss

- Power Station (DIW, 1997)
- Persistence (Cellar Live, 2022)

With others

- The Tenor Triangle, Tell It Like It Is (Criss Cross, 1993)
- Joe Magnarelli, Why Not (Criss Cross, 1994)
- The Tenor Triangle, Aztec Blues (Criss Cross, 1994)
- Rick Stone, Steppin' Back (Jazzand, 1994)
- Robert Mazurek, Badlands (Hep, 1995)
- Melvin Rhyne, Stick to the Kick (Criss Cross, 1995)
- John Swana, In the Moment (Criss Cross, 1995)
- Atro "Wade" Mikkola Quartet, On The Way (AMK [Finland], 1995)
- Peter Bernstein, Brain Dance (Criss Cross, 1996)
- Robert Mazurek, Green & Blue (Hep, 1996)
- Mark Elf, A Minor Scramble (Jen Bay, 1996)
- Dave Specter & Lenny Lynn, Blues Spoken Here (Delmark, 1998)
- Pat Martino, Stone Blue (Blue Note, 1998)
- John Swana & Joe Magnarelli, Philly-New York Junction (Criss Cross, 1998)
- Paul Bollenback, Soul Grooves (Challenge, 1998)
- Yoron Israel Connection, Live at the Blue Note (Half Note, 1998)
- Melvin Rhyne, Classmasters (Criss Cross, 1999)
- Jimmy McGriff, McGriff's House Party (Milestone, 1999)
- Norman Simmons, The Art of Norman Simmons (Savant, 2000)
- Mads Baerentzen Trio, 785 Madison Ave. (Music Mecca, 2000)
- Dmitri Kolesnik, Blues for Dad (Boheme, 2001)
- Ryan Kisor, The Dream (Criss Cross, 2001)
- Norman Simmons, Synthesis (Savant, 2002)
- Joe Magnarelli & John Swana, New York-Philly Junction (Criss Cross, 2003)
- Jimmy Cobb's Mob, Cobb's Groove (Milestone, 2003)
- Simone [Kopmajer], Romance (Venus, 2004)
- Jim Snidero, Close Up (Milestone, 2004)
- Freddy Cole, This Love of Mine (HighNote, 2005)
- Terry Gibbs, Feelin' Good – Live in Studio (Mack Avenue, 2005)
- Dmitri Kolesnik, Five Corners (Challenge, 2007)
- John Swana, Bright Moments (Criss Cross, 2007)
- Dave O'Higgins Quintet, Sketchbook (Jazzizit, 2008)
- Stewy Von Wattenwyl Generations Trio, Live at Marians (Bemsha Music, 2008)
- Meeting Point, Quintessence (Challenge, 2008)
- Larry Willis, The Offering (HighNote, 2008)
- Neal Smith Quintet, Live at Smalls (Smalls Live, 2009)
- Pat Martino Quartet, Undeniable: Live at Blues Alley (HighNote, 2011)
- Alexis Cole (with One for All), You'd Be So Nice to Come Home To (Venus, 2011)
- Alexis Cole sings Pepper Adams, I Carry Your Heart (Motéma, 2012)
- Dee Daniels, State of the Art (Criss Cross, 2013) (quartet includes Cyrus Chestnut)
- Dena DeRose, We Won't Forget You...An Homage To Shirley Horn (HighNote, 2014) (with Jeremy Pelt, Gary Smulyan)
- Federico Bonifazi, You'll See (Steeplechase, 2015)
- Bernd Reiter Quintet, Workout at Bird's Eye (A Tribute to Hank Mobley & Grant Green) (Steeplechase, 2015)
- Harry Allen's All Star New York Saxophone Band, The Candy Men (Arbors, 2015)
- Andrew Dickeson, Is That So (Andrew Dickeson Productions, 2017)
- David Kikoski, Phoenix Rising (HighNote, 2019)
- Cory Weeds, O Sole Mio! Music From The Motherland (Cellar Music Group, 2021)
- Caesar Frazier, Tenacity / As We Speak (Track Merchant, 2022)
- Paul Brusger, A Soul Contract (SteepleChase, 2023)
- Bernie Senensky, Moment To Moment (Cellar Music Group, 2023)
- Thom Rotella, Side Hustle (HighNote, 2024)
