= Sunday in New York (album) =

Studio album by Eric Alexander
- Released: 2005
- Recorded: March 18, 2005
- Studio: Avatar Studio, New York
- Genre: Jazz
- Label: Venus
- Producer: Tetsuo Hara, Todd Barkan

Sunday in New York is an album by Eric Alexander, with John Hicks, John Webber, and Joe Farnsworth.

== Recording and music ==
The album was recorded at Avatar Studio in New York on March 18, 2005. The four musicians are tenor saxophonist Eric Alexander, pianist John Hicks, bassist John Webber, and drummer Joe Farnsworth. The material is standards, plus "Avotcja" by Hicks.

== Release and reception ==
Professional ratings
Review scores
Source	Rating
AllMusic	4/5 stars

Sunday in New York was released by Venus Records. The AllMusic reviewer described it as "an outstanding date".

== Track listing ==
1. "Sunday in New York"
2. "Avotcja"
3. "Dearly Beloved"
4. "Like Someone in Love"
5. "Watch What Happens"
6. "My Girl Is Just Enough Woman for Me"
7. "Alone Together"
8. "My Romance"

== Personnel ==
- Eric Alexander – tenor saxophone
- John Hicks – piano
- John Webber – bass
- Joe Farnsworth – drums
