= John Webber (musician) =

American jazz musician

- Born: John Robert Webber; August 5, 1965 (age 61); St. Louis, Missouri, U.S.
- Genre: Jazz
- Instruments: Double bass

John Robert Webber (born August 5, 1965) is an American jazz double-bassist.

== Early life and education ==
Webber was born in St. Louis. He first learned to play bass guitar before switching to stand-up bass at age 15. He attended Northern Illinois University and Roosevelt University in Chicago, where he worked with Von Freeman and Brad Goode.

== Career ==
Webber relocated to New York City in 1987 and played with Bill Hardman, Junior Cook, Tardo Hammer, John Marshall, and Michael Weiss before the end of the decade. In the 1990s he played with Christopher Hollyday, Johnny Griffin, Jimmy Cobb, Lou Donaldson, David Hazeltine, Diana Krall, Annie Ross, Mike LeDonne, Peter Bernstein, Eric Alexander, Chris Flory, Doug Lawrence, Etta Jones, Jim Rotondi, Ryan Kisor, and Horace Silver.

== Discography ==
=== As sideman ===
With Eric Alexander

- Straight Up (Delmark, 1992)
- Two of a Kind (Criss Cross Jazz, 1996)
- Mode for Mabes (Delmark, 1997)
- Summit Meeting (Milestone, 2001)
- Dead Center (HighNote, 2004)
- Sunday in New York (Venus, 2005)
- The Battle (HighNote Records, 2005)
- Chim Chim Cheree (Venus, 2009)
- Tenor Time (Criss Cross Jazz, 2011)
- Touching (HighNote, 2012)
- Friendly Fire (HighNote,2012)
- Chicago Fire (HighNote, 2013)
- The Real Thing (HighNote, 2015)
- Song of No Regrets (HighNote, 2017)
- Eric Alexander with Strings (HighNote, 2019)
- A New Beginning - Alto Saxophone with Strings (HighNote, 2023)

With Ernie Andrews

- The Many Faces of Ernie Andrews (HighNote, 1998)
- Girl Talk (HighNote, 2001)
- Jump for Joy (HighNote, 2003)

With Jimmy Cobb

- Cobb's Groove (Fantasy, 2003)
- Jazz in the Key of Blue (Chesky, 2009)
- The Original Mob (Smoke Sessions, 2014)

With Tardo Hammer

- Bopera House (VSOP, 1988)
- Look Stop and Listen: The Music of Tadd Dameron (Sharp Nine Records, 2007)

With David Hazeltine

- The Inspiration Suite (Sharp Nine, 2007)
- Inversions (Criss Cross, 2010)

With Etta Jones

- My Buddy: Etta Jones Sings the Songs of Buddy Johnson (HighNote, 1998)
- All the Way (HighNote, 1999)
- Etta Jones Sings Lady Day (HighNote, 2001)
- Always in Our Hearts (HighNote, 2004)

With Hank Jones & Frank Wess

- Hank and Frank (Lineage Records, 2006)
- Hank and Frank II (Lineage Records, 2009)

With Ryan Kisor

- Point of Arrival (Criss Cross Jazz, 2000)
- The Dream (Criss Cross Jazz, 2002)

With Harold Mabern

- Mr. Lucky (HighNote, 2012)
- Live at Smalls (Smalls Live)
- Right On Time (Smoke Sessions)
- Afro Blue (Smoke Sessions)
- The Iron Man: Live at Smoke (Smoke Sessions, 2018)
- Mabern Plays Mabern (Smoke Sessions, 2018)
- Mabern Plays Coltrane (Smoke Sessions, 2018)

With Joe Magnarelli

- Mr. Mags (Chris Cross Jazz, 2001)

With Rob Mazurek

- Man Facing East (Hep, 1994)
- Badlands (Hep, 1995)
- Green & Blue (Hep, 1997)

With One for All

- The Lineup (Sharp Nine, 2006)
- Return of the Lineup (Sharp Nine, 2009)
- Incorrigible (JLP/Jazz Legacy Productions, 2009)
- Invades Vancouver! (Cellar Live, 2010)
- The Third Decade (Smoke Sessions, 2016)

With Cecil Payne

- Payne's Window (Delmark, 1999)
- Chic Boom, Live at the Jazz Showcase (Delmark, 2001)

With Jim Rotondi

- Jim's Bop (Criss Cross, 1997)
- Reverence (Criss Cross, 2000)
- Four of a Kind (Posi-Tone, 2008)
- The Move (Criss Cross, 2010)

With Michael Weiss

- Power Station (DIW, 1997)
