= Chicago Fire (Eric Alexander album) =

Studio album by Eric Alexander
- Released: 2014
- Recorded: November 26, 2013
- Studio: Van Gelder Studio, Englewood Cliffs, New Jersey
- Genre: Jazz
- Label: HighNote
- Producer: Eric Alexander

Chicago Fire is an album by tenor saxophonist Eric Alexander. It was recorded in 2013 and released by HighNote Records the following year.

== Recording and music ==
The album was recorded at the Van Gelder Studio, Englewood Cliffs, New Jersey, on November 26, 2013. Most tracks are played by the quartet of tenor saxophonist Eric Alexander, pianist Harold Mabern, bassist John Webber, and drummer Joe Farnsworth. Trumpeter Jeremy Pelt is added for three tracks. Alexander also produced the album. The tracks have a Chicago theme: "The Bee Hive" is named after a former club there, while "Eddie Harris", "Mr. Stitt", and "Blueski for Vonski" are for musicians associated with the city (Eddie Harris, Sonny Stitt, and Von Freeman, respectively).

== Release and reception ==
Professional ratings
Review scores
Source	Rating
AllMusic	3.5/5 stars

Chicago Fire was released by HighNote Records in 2014. JazzTimes reported that "Alexander has released more than 30 albums in two decades, and this is one of the most vital." The AllMusic reviewer concluded that, "Chicago Fire is a no-nonsense set of original and cover songs that showcases his passionate, swinging, straight-ahead jazz sound."

== Track listing ==
1. "Save Your Love for Me"
2. "The Bee Hive"
3. "Eddie Harris"
4. "Just One of Those Things"
5. "Blueski for Vonski"
6. "Mr. Stitt"
7. "You Talk That Talk"
8. "Don't Take Your Love from Me"

== Personnel ==
- Eric Alexander – tenor saxophone
- Jeremy Pelt – trumpet (tracks 1, 2, 7)
- Harold Mabern – piano
- John Webber – bass
- Joe Farnsworth – drums
