= To Love and Be Loved =

Studio album by Harold Mabern
- Released: August 25, 2017
- Recorded: April 17, 2017
- Genre: Jazz
- Label: Smoke Sessions

To Love and Be Loved is an album by pianist Harold Mabern. It was released by Smoke Sessions Records in 2017.

== Recording and music ==
Six of the ten tracks are played by the quartet of Harold Mabern (piano), Eric Alexander (tenor sax), Nat Reeves (bass), and Jimmy Cobb (drums). Three of the tracks have trumpeter Freddie Hendrix added, while the title track adds to the quartet Cyro Baptista on percussion. "Dat Dere" is played by Mabern alone. Alexander composed "The Iron Man" in honor of Mabern. Hendrix arranged "The Gigolo".

== Release and reception ==
Professional ratings
Review scores
| Source | Rating |
|---|---|
| Down Beat | 4/5 stars |
| The Times | 4/5 stars |

The album was released by Smoke Sessions Records on August 25, 2017. The Down Beat reviewer highlighted Mabern's solo piece: "Though he's performed and recorded this one before, the pianist's fearless melodic attack of the ivories and unfailingly soulful feel for the blues remain poised to make longtime fans fall in love all over again."

== Track listing ==
1. "To Love and Be Loved"
2. "If There Is Someone Lovelier Than You"
3. "The Gigolo"
4. "Inner Glimpse"
5. "My Funny Valentine" (Richard Rodgers, Lorenz Hart)
6. "The Iron Man" (Eric Alexander)
7. "So What" (Miles Davis)
8. "I Get a Kick Out of You" (Cole Porter)
9. "Dat Dere" (Bobby Timmons, Oscar Brown, Jr)
10. "Hittin' the Jug"

== Personnel ==
- Harold Mabern – piano
- Eric Alexander – tenor sax (tracks 1–8, 10)
- Nat Reeves – bass (tracks 1–8, 10)
- Jimmy Cobb – drums (tracks 1–8, 10)
- Freddie Hendrix – trumpet (tracks 3–4, 7)
- Cyro Baptista – percussion (track 1)
