= William O'Connell =

William or Bill O'Connell may refer to:

- William Henry O'Connell (1859–1944), American cardinal of the Roman Catholic Church
- William O'Connell (priest), Archdeacon of Tuam, 1928–1939
- William O'Connell (politician) (1852–1903), member of the Queensland Legislative Assembly
- William O'Connell (actor) (1929–2024), American film and television actor
- Bill O'Connell (musician) (born 1953), American jazz pianist, educator, and bandleader
- Bill O'Connell (rugby union) (born 1930), Irish international rugby union player
