= Cerupa =

Studio album by Cecil Payne
- Released: 1995
- Recorded: June 1 & 2, 1993
- Studio: Riverside Studios, Chicago
- Genre: Jazz
- Length: 69:28
- Label: Delmark; DE-478
- Producer: Robert G. Koester

Cecil Payne chronology
Casbah (1985)	Cerupa (1995)	Scotch and Milk (1997)

Cerupa is an album by the American jazz saxophonist/flautist Cecil Payne, recorded in 1993 and released by the Delmark label in 1995.

== Reception ==
Professional ratings
Review scores
Source	Rating
AllMusic	4.5/5 stars
The Penguin Guide to Jazz Recordings	3/4 stars

AllMusic reviewer Michael G. Nastos stated: "At age 72, Cecil Payne makes a recorded comeback with this release. He sounds in fine form, playing with dexterity, clarity, and depth on baritone sax, and brings out his flute for two of the eight cuts. ... As great a baritone saxophonist as Payne has always been, his recording career is checkered. On the big horn, and especially flute where he is an unsung hero, this CD proves a great statement for an enduring jazzman who was never far from the truth, and still digs what he's doing. Recommended as perhaps his best documented work".

== Track listing ==
All compositions by Cecil Payne, except where noted.

1. "The Opening" – 7:36
2. "Bolambo" – 8:43
3. "I Should Care" (Axel Stordahl, Paul Weston, Sammy Cahn) – 8:42
4. "Cerupa" – 8:05
5. "Be Wee" – 9:23
6. "Cuba" (Gil Fuller) – 4:46
7. "Bosco" – 8:54
8. "Brookfield Andante" – 13:19

== Personnel ==
- Cecil Payne – baritone saxophone, flute
- Freddie Hubbard (track 5), Dr. Odies Williams III (track 8) – trumpet
- Eric Alexander – tenor saxophone
- Harold Mabern – piano
- John Ore – bass
- Joe Farnsworth – drums
