= Philadelphia Bound =

Studio album by Harold Mabern, Kieran Overs
- Released: 1994
- Recorded: April 15, 1991 & February 29, 1992
- Genre: Jazz
- Label: Sackville

Philadelphia Bound is an album by pianist Harold Mabern and bassist Kieran Overs. It was recorded in 1991 and 1992 and released by Sackville Records.

== Recording and music ==
The music was recorded in April 1991 and February 1992. The two musicians are pianist Harold Mabern and bassist Kieran Overs. Ten of the tracks were written by musicians from Philadelphia; the final track – "Edward Lee" – was written by Mabern. "The Cry of My People" is played by Mabern alone.

== Reception ==
Professional ratings
Review scores
Source	Rating
AllMusic	4/5 stars
The Penguin Guide to Jazz	3/4 stars

The AllMusic reviewer commented that "Mabern and Overs work quite well together, with the bassist adding stimulating lines to the pianist's solos and having some good solo spots himself." The Penguin Guide to Jazz praised the pianist's "awesome flexibility and awareness within his chosen stylistic field."

== Track listing ==
1. "Philadelphia Bound" – 4:20
2. "Are You Real" – 5:37
3. "Ceora" – 7:51
4. "Lazy Bird" – 6:14
5. "Whisper Not" – 6:39
6. "The Gigolo" – 5:26
7. "Dear Lord" – 4:28
8. "So Tired" – 7:43
9. "The Cry of My People" – 5:54
10. "Six Steps" – 4:16
11. "Edward Lee" – 4:36

== Personnel ==
- Harold Mabern – piano
- Kieran Overs – bass
