= Right on Time (Harold Mabern album) =

Live album by Harold Mabern
- Released: 2014
- Recorded: March 2013
- Venue: Smoke
- Genre: Jazz
- Label: Smoke Sessions

Right on Time is an album by pianist Harold Mabern. It was released by Smoke Sessions Records in 2014.

== Recording and music ==
The musicians are Harold Mabern (piano), John Webber (bass), and Joe Farnsworth (drums). The album was recorded in concert at Smoke jazz club in New York.

== Release ==
The album was released by Smoke Sessions Records in 2014. It was the label's first release.

== Track listing ==
1. "Dance with Me"
2. "Seven Steps to Heaven"
3. "Don't Get Around Much Anymore"
4. "My Favorite Things"
5. "To You"
6. "Edward Lee"
7. "Making Our Dreams Come True"
8. "Charade"
9. "Blues for Frank 'n' Paul 'n' All"
10. "The Nearness of You"
11. "Cherokee"

== Personnel ==
- Harold Mabern – piano
- John Webber – bass
- Joe Farnsworth – drums
