= Todd Barkan =

American jazz impresario and producer

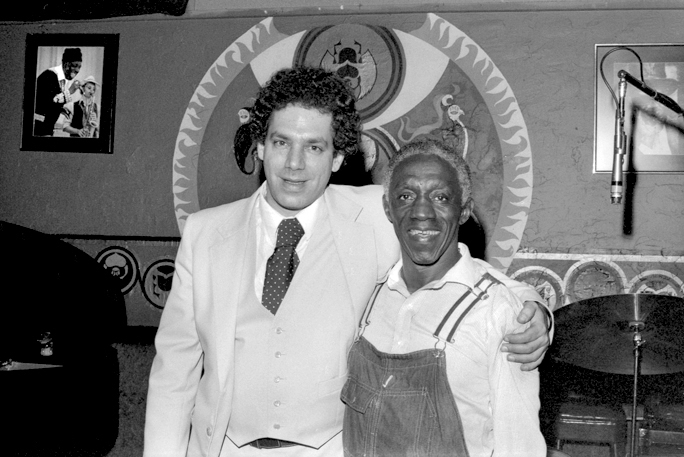
- Barkan (left) with Art Blakey at Keystone Korner, 1979
- Born: August 13, 1946 (age 80); Lincoln, Nebraska, U.S.
- Occupations: Club owner, jazz impresario
- Years active: 1964–present

Todd Barkan (born August 13, 1946) is an American jazz impresario and producer.

== Biography ==
Born in Lincoln, Nebraska, Barkan grew up in Columbus, Ohio and attended Oberlin College. He ran a club in San Francisco called Keystone Korner from 1972 to 1983, which became, in the words of journalist Bob Margolis, "legendary for its adventurous bookings and its bohemian ambience". A fan of jazz from a young age, Barkan ran the club despite its inability to break even, and financial troubles resulted in its closure in 1983. Barkan then relocated to New York City, where he became the manager of the Boys Choir of Todd Barkan; around 1990 he returned to the Bay Area to manage the club Yoshi's in Oakland. He quit Yoshi's in 1993 and worked as a record producer for the rest of the decade, with labels such as Fantasy, Milestone, HighNote, Columbia, Sunnyside, and Concord, as well as many Japanese labels.

In 2000, Barkan was hired to take Joel Dorn's place as head of the jazz label 32 Records. In 2001 he began working as the director of Dizzy's Club Coca-Cola at Jazz at Lincoln Center, a position he held until 2012. In 2011, Barkan was in a car accident which left him hospitalized for weeks. Starting in 2013, he began hosting a jazz night at Iridium, a club in New York City.

In 2019, Barkan and Michelin-starred chef Robert Wiedmaier re-launched the Keystone Korner in Baltimore's Harbor East.

== Awards ==
- 2018 NEA Jazz Masters
