= Preaching to the Choir (album) =

2021 album by Vincent Herring

Studio album by Vincent Herring
- Released: April 30, 2021
- Recorded: July 31 – August 1, 2020 and November 20–21, 2020
- Venue: Smoke Jazz & Supper Club, New York City
- Genre: Jazz
- Length: 65:21
- Label: Smoke Sessions
- Producer: Paul Stache, Damon Smith

Vincent Herring chronology
| Bird at 100 (2019) | Preaching to the Choir (2021) | Soul Jazz (2024) |

Preaching to the Choir is an album by saxophonist Vincent Herring, which was recorded in 2020 and released the following year on the Smoke Sessions label.

== Reception ==
Professional ratings
Review scores
| Source | Rating |
|---|---|
| Jazzwise | 4/5 stars |
| The Times | 4/5 stars |

Jazzwise reviewed the album stating,

One of the less-lionised among the Young Lions of the 1990s, Herring perhaps didn’t get the same publicity because he spent a long time in the quintet of Nat Adderley, ostensibly deputising for the leader's brother. Not that he sounds much like Cannonball, except in the constant manipulation of his tone and articulation to enliven his phraseology, and in the rhythmic and melodic variety that regularly brings a smile to the listener's physiognomy. Similarly, the programming poses no problems for listener or performers, featuring groovy heads by among others Cedar Walton and Wes Montgomery alongside well-worn (but now refreshed) standards by Stevie Wonder, Lionel Richie, Burton Lane and Ellington ... This is enough to guarantee a rewarding listen, but worth mentioning too is that apparently Herring undertook the session while suffering a debilitating bout of rheumatoid arthritis – you would never know it!

The Times said, "Vincent Herring made this album thinking it would be his last. A bout of coronavirus left him with rheumatoid arthritis — a worry for any saxophonist. Yet his abilities aren’t impaired and nor is his attitude. Although the CD booklet shows his masked quartet playing behind Perspex screens and quotes him on the pandemic and politics, instead of fretting or finger-wagging he goes full steam ahead on a session of smile-inducing swing".

== Track listing ==
1. "Dudli's Dilemma" (Vincent Herring) – 6:00
2. "Old Devil Moon" (Burton Lane, Yip Harburg) – 7:47
3. "Ojos de Rojo" (Cedar Walton) – 6:53
4. "Hello" (Lionel Richie) – 5:56
5. "Fried Pies" (Wes Montgomery) – 7:37
6. "Minor Swing" (Cyrus Chestnut) – 6:03
7. "In a Sentimental Mood" (Duke Ellington) – 6:26
8. "Preaching to the Choir" (Vincent Herring) – 5:02
9. "Granted" (Joe Henderson) – 6:37
10. "You Are the Sunshine of My Life" (Stevie Wonder) – 7:32

== Personnel ==
- Vincent Herring – alto saxophone
- Cyrus Chestnut – piano
- Yasushi Nakamura – bass
- Johnathan Blake – drums
