= Friendly Fire: Live at Smoke =

Live album by Eric Alexander and Vincent Herring
- Released: April 2, 2012
- Recorded: August 19–20, 2011
- Venue: Smoke Jazz & Supper Club, NYC
- Genre: Jazz
- Length: 62:44
- Label: HighNote
- Producer: Vincent Herring, Eric Alexander

Eric Alexander chronology
Don't Follow the Crowd (2011)	Friendly Fire: Live at Smoke (2012)	Touching (2013)

Vincent Herring chronology
Morning Star (2010)	Friendly Fire: Live at Smoke (2012)	The Uptown Shuffle (2013)

Friendly Fire: Live at Smoke is an album by saxophonists Eric Alexander and Vincent Herring, which was recorded in 2011 and released the following year on the HighNote label.

== Reception ==
Professional ratings
Review scores
Source	Rating
AllMusic	3.5/5 stars
All About Jazz	4/5 stars
Jazzwise	4/5 stars

AllMusic reviewed the album stating "tenor saxophonist Eric Alexander and alto saxophonist Vincent Herring join in this tradition with a swinging, passionate set of standards recorded live at the respected N.Y.C. venue ... This is a lively and exciting session of adventurous and old-school straight-ahead jazz". Jazzwise said "If you're into hard-swinging 'live' jazz performed by master musicians, rooted in the tradition but modern-minded, in front of an enthusiastic club audience, you'll find it hard to come up with a better current CD than this ... Of its kind, this is as good as it gets". On All About Jazz Jack Bowers noted "Not only are Alexander and Herring carrying on the tradition, they are among the most resourceful and enterprising saxophonists on the scene today. Alexander has yet to sculpt a solo that is less than persuasive, while Herring is irrepressibly candid in the manner of one of his main influences, the great Cannonball Adderley ... While this live session may awaken memories of days gone by, it's as stylish and inventive as today".

== Track listing ==
1. "Pat 'n Chat" (Hank Mobley) – 8:17
2. "Sukiyaki" (Kyu Sakamoto) – 9:50
3. "Inception" (McCoy Tyner) – 8:47
4. "Dig Dis" (Hank Mobley) – 8:42
5. "You've Changed" (Carl T. Fischer) – 4:57
6. "Here's That Rainy Day" (Jimmy Van Heusen) – 8:43
7. "Mona Lisa" (Jay Livingston, Ray Evans) – 4:14
8. "Timothy" (Vincent Herring) – 9:14

== Personnel ==
- Vincent Herring – alto saxophone
- Eric Alexander – tenor saxophone
- Mike LeDonne – piano
- John Webber – bass
- Carl Allen – drums
