= Night and Day (Vincent Herring album) =

2015 album by Vincent Herring

Studio album by Vincent Herring
- Released: May 12, 2015
- Recorded: August 22, 2014
- Studio: Sear Sound, Studio C, New York City
- Genre: Jazz
- Length: 62:29
- Label: Smoke Sessions
- Producer: Paul Stache, Damon Smith

Vincent Herring chronology
The Uptown Shuffle (2014)	Night and Day (2015)	Hard Times (2017)

Night and Day is an album by saxophonist Vincent Herring, which was recorded in 2014 and released the following year on the Smoke Sessions label.

== Reception ==
Professional ratings
Review scores
Source	Rating
Jazzwise	4/5 stars

Jazzwise reviewed the album stating,

Another strong Paul Stache production for Smoke. Herring is at his most assertive throughout 10 tracks ... Herring is probably the nearest we have today to a Cannonball Adderley. He's 50 now and plays with all the confidence in the world. This studio CD has all the energy of a ‘live’ club recording ... Arguably Herring's best record to date.

The New York Times said, "The alto saxophonist Vincent Herring projects his sound in a strong, centered beam, and even his most intense moments suggest a controlled combustion ... Mr. Herring should have a higher profile, as he confirms with a smart new album, Night and Day. ... the music here puts a contemporary spin on hard-bop."

== Track listing ==
1. "Grind Hog's Day" (Gary Fisher) – 7:01
2. "Night and Day" (Cole Porter) – 5:28
3. "The Adventures of Hyun Joo Lee" (Vincent Herring) – 4:49
4. "Walton" (Mike LeDonne) – 6:27
5. "The Gypsy" (Billy Reid) – 7:26
6. "Fly, Little Bird, Fly" (Donald Byrd) – 5:04
7. "Wabash" (Cannonball Adderley) – 5:10
8. "Theme For Jobim" (Cedar Walton) – 7:09
9. "There Is Something About You (I Don't Know)" (Tex Allen) – 8:55
10. "Smoking Paul's Stash" (Vincent Herring) – 5:31

== Personnel ==
- Vincent Herring – alto saxophone
- Jeremy Pelt – trumpet (tracks 1, 3, 4, 6 & 8)
- Mike LeDonne – piano
- Brandi Disterheft – bass
- Joe Farnsworth – drums
