= Jim Rotondi =

American jazz musician (1962–2024)

- Born: James Robert Rotondi; August 28, 1962; Butte, Montana, U.S.
- Died: July 8, 2024 (aged 61) Le Crest, Auvergne-Rhône-Alpes, France
- Genre: Jazz
- Occupation: Musician
- Instrument: Trumpet
- Labels: Criss Cross; Posi-Tone; Smoke Sessions
- Member of: One for All
- Website: www.jimrotondi.com

James Robert Rotondi (August 28, 1962 – July 8, 2024) was an American jazz trumpeter, composer, arranger, educator, and conductor.

The youngest of five siblings, Rotondi was born in Butte, Montana. He played in New York City for twenty years before moving to Austria. He taught at the University for Music and Dramatic Arts in Graz, Austria. He has released over fifteen albums as a leader for Sharp Nine, Criss Cross, Posi-Tone, and Smoke Sessions Records. He played on over eighty albums as a sideman. He performed and recorded with Ray Charles, Lionel Hampton, the Toshiko Akiyoshi Jazz Orchestra, Lou Donaldson, Curtis Fuller, Benny Sharoni, Eric Alexander, and George Coleman.

Rotondi led a quintet, which featured vibraphonist Joe Locke, and an electric band with David Hazeltine called Full House, which used electronic sound on his trumpet and a variety of other electronic instruments. He was also a member of the group One for All.

In 1984, while attending North Texas State University (University of North Texas), he won first place in the International Trumpet Guild's jazz trumpet competition.

Rotondi died of a heart attack in Le Crest, Auvergne-Rhône-Alpes on July 8, 2024, at the age of 61.

== Discography ==
=== As leader ===
- Introducing Jim Rotondi (Criss Cross, 1997)
- Jim's Bop (Criss Cross, 1997)
- Reverence (Criss Cross, 2000)
- Excursions (Criss Cross, 2000)
- Destination Up (Sharp Nine, 2001)
- New Vistas (Criss Cross, 2004)
- The Pleasure Dome (Sharp Nine, 2004)
- Iron Man (Criss Cross, 2006)
- Four of a Kind (Posi-Tone, 2008)
- Blues for Brother Ray (Posi-Tone, 2009)
- 1000 Rainbows (Posi-Tone, 2010)
- The Move (Criss Cross, 2010)
- Live at Smalls (Smalls Live, 2010)
- Hard Hittin' at the Bird's Eye (Sharp Nine, 2013)
- Dark Blue (Smoke Sessions, 2016)
- Over Here (Criss Cross, 2023)
- Finesse (Cellar Music Group, 2024)
- Bluesbag (G2 Records, 2024)

=== As sideman ===
With One for All

- Too Soon to Tell (Sharp Nine, 1997)
- Optimism (Sharp Nine, 1998)
- Upward and Onward (Criss Cross, 1999)
- What's Going On (Venus, 2000)
- The Long Haul (Criss Cross, 2000)
- The End of a Love Affair (Venus, 2001)
- Live at Smoke Volume 1 (Criss Cross, 2001)
- Wide Horizons (Criss Cross, 2002)
- No Problem (Venus, 2003)
- Blueslike (Criss Cross, 2004)
- Killer Joe (Venus, 2005)
- The Lineup (Sharp Nine, 2006)
- What's Going On? (Venus, 2007)
- Return of the Lineup (Sharp Nine, 2009)
- Incorrigible (JLP/Jazz Legacy Productions, 2009)
- Invades Vancouver! (Cellar Live, 2010)
- The Third Decade (Smoke Sessions, 2016)
- Big George (Smoke Sessions, 2024)

With Eric Alexander

- Straight Up (Delmark, 1992)
- Man with a Horn (Milestone, 1997)
- Solid! (Milestone, 1998)
- Mode for Mabes (Delmark, 1999)
- Alexander the Great (HighNote, 2000)
- The Second Milestone (Milestone, 2001)
- Temple of Olympic Zeus (HighNote, 2007)

With Charles Earland

- Blowing the Blues Away (HighNote, 1997)
- Cookin' with the Mighty Burner (HighNote, 1999)
- Live (Cannonball, 1999)
- Stomp! (HighNote, 2000)
- Charles Earland Tribute Band - Keepers of the Flame (HighNote, 2002)

With Irene Reid

- Million Dollar Secret (Savant, 1997)
- I Ain't Doing Too Bad (Savant, 1999)
- The Uptown Lowdown (Savant, 2000)
- One Monkey Don't Stop No Show (Savant, 2002)

With others

- One O'Clock Lab Band, Lab 85 (North Texas Lab, 1985)
- Ray Appleton, Killer Ray Rides Again (Sharp Nine, 1996)
- Ann Hampton Callaway, To Ella with Love (After 9, 1996)
- Steve Davis, Dig Deep (Criss Cross, 1997)
- Bill Mobley, Live at Small's Vol. 1 (Space Time, 1997)
- Various Artists, 45 years of Jazz and Blues (Delmark, 1997)
- Various Artists, Funky Organ B-3 Jazz Grooves (HighNote, 1997)
- Susan Tobocman, Watercolor Dream (C.A.P./Mike Longo Productions,1998)
- Bill Mobley, Live at Small's Vol. 2 (Space Time, 1998)
- David Hazeltine, How It Is (Criss Cross, 1998)
- Giacomo Gates, Fly Rite (Sharp Nine, 1998)
- Mike LeDonne, Then & Now (Double-Time, 1999)
- Lionel Hampton, 90th Birthday Celebration (Sound Hills, 1999)
- Paul Bollenback, Soul Grooves (Challenge, 1999)
- Various Artists, Essential Young Lions, Vol. 2 (Hip-O/UMe, 1999)
- Various Artists, Jazz That Cooks (HighNote, 1999)
- Various Artists, Jazz That's Easy (HighNote, 1999)
- Dena DeRose, I Can See Clearly Now (Sharp Nine, 2000)
- George Coleman, Danger High Voltage (Two and Four, 2000)
- Randy Johnston, Homage (J Curve, 2000)
- Various Artists, Jazz for a Summer Night (HighNote, 2000)
- Various Artists, That Lonely Feeling Called the Blues (HighNote, 2000)
- Mike LeDonne, Then and Now (Double-Time, 2000)
- Mike LeDonne, Bag's Groove a Tribute to Milt Jackson (Double-Time, 2001)
- Cecil Payne, Chic Boom, Live at the Jazz Showcase (Delmark, 2001)
- Mike DiRubbo, Keep Steppin' (Criss Cross, 2001)
- Jazz Faculty @ Purchase College, 10th Anniversary Celebration (Purchase Records, 2002)
- Various Artists, Jazz for Singers and Dreamers (HighNote, 2002)
- Dena DeRose, Love's Holiday (Sharp Nine, 2002)
- Ned Otter, Secrets Inside (Two and Four, 2002)
- Toshiko Akiyoshi, Jazz Orchestra Featuring Lew Tabackin, Hiroshima Rising from the Abyss (Video Arts, 2002)
- Mike DiRubbo, Human Spirit' (Criss Cross, 2003)
- Joe Farnsworth, It's Prime Time (441 Records, 2003)
- Various Artists, Jazz with Gentle Rhythms (HighNote, 2003)
- Eric Starr, She (Bronx Bound Records, 2003)
- Seleno Clarke, Diversity #2 - Live at Smoke (Self-produced, 2003)
- Toshiko Akiyoshi, Jazz Orchestra Featuring Lew Tabackin, Last Live in Blue Note Tokyo (Warner Music Japan, 2004)
- Full House, Champagne Taste – Nagel Heyer, 2005)
- Kyle Eastwood, Paris Blue (Candid, 2005)
- Westchester Jazz Orchestra, All In (WJO, 2007)
- Peter Lerner, Cry For Peace (Blujazz Records, 2007)
- Dimitri Kolesnik, Five Corners (Challenge, 2007)
- Various Artists, Funky Pieces of Silver - The Horace Silver Songbook (HighNote, 2007)
- Darren Solomon, Science for Girls (Self-produced, 2007)
- Alex Graham, Brand New (Origin, 2008)
- James Silberstein, Express Lane (Self-produced, 2008)
- Ofer Assaf, Tangible Reality (Summit, 2008)
- Bob Mintzer, Swing Out (MCG, 2008)
- Meeting Point, Quintessence (Challenge, 2008)
- Peter Hand, The Wizard of Jazz (Savant, 2009)
- Jeff Lashway, Reunion (Random Act, 2009)
- Cory Weeds, Everything's Coming Up Weeds (Cellar Live, 2009)
- Westchester Jazz Orchestra, Maiden Voyage (WJO, 2010)
- Alexis Cole, You'd Be So Nice to Come Home to (Venus, 2010)
- John Regen, Revolution (Ropeadope, 2011)
- Jared Gold, All Wrapped Up (Posi-Tone, 2011)
- Craig Wuepper, Leaps and Bounds (Cellar Live, 2013)
- Benny Sharoni: Slant Signature (Papaya, 2014)
- Ed Neumeister, Suite Ellington (PAO Records, 2015)
- Neil Slater, Legacy - Division of Jazz Studies North Texas (North Texas Jazz, 2017)
- John Regen, Higher Ground (Ropeadope, 2019)
- Win Pongsakorn, Yes, It Is! Introducing Win Pongsakorn (Cellar Music Group, 2020)
- Jakob Helling, Nerds & Sweeties (featuring Fay Claassen) (Quinton Records, 2023)
- Win Pongsakorn, Time Has Changed (Cellar Music Group, 2024)
