= Portrait in Sound =

Studio album by Steve Davis
- Recorded: March–April, 2000
- Genre: Jazz
- Label: Stretch

Portrait in Sound is an album by jazz trombonist Steve Davis.

== Music and recording ==
The core band is Davis (trombone), David Hazeltine (piano), Nat Reeves (bass), and Joe Farnsworth (drums); other musicians appear as guests. Seven of the pieces are Davis originals. Other tracks included standards and a new Chick Corea composition, "Shadows".

== Critical reception ==
The AllMusic reviewer wrote that "Portrait in Sound instantly reveals Steve Davis as an expert trombone player who communicates his musical visions with instinctive self-confidence as well as technical expertise."

Professional ratings
Review scores
Source	Rating
AllMusic	4.5/5 stars
The Penguin Guide to Jazz	3.5/4 stars

== Track listing ==
1. "Portrait in Sound"
2. "I'm Old Fashioned"
3. "Shadows"
4. "The Slowdown"
5. "Darn That Dream"
6. "Runway"
7. "Somber Song"
8. "A Bundle of Joy"
9. "I Found You"
10. "Samba D"

== Personnel ==
- Steve Davis – trombone
- David Hazeltine – piano
- Nat Reeves – bass
- Joe Farnsworth – drums

Guest musicians

- Steve Wilson – alto sax, alto flute
- Brad Mehldau – piano
- Steve Nelson – vibraphone
- Avishai Cohen – bass
- Jeff Ballard – drums, percussion
