= The Battle: Live at Smoke =

Live album by Vincent Herring and Eric Alexander
- Released: August 16, 2005
- Recorded: April 1–2, 2005
- Venue: Smoke Jazz & Supper Club, NYC
- Genre: Jazz
- Length: 1:00:30
- Label: HighNote; HCD 7137
- Producer: Vincent Herring, Eric Alexander

Vincent Herring chronology
Mr. Wizard (2004)	The Battle: Live at Smoke (2005)	Ends and Means (2006)

Eric Alexander chronology
It's All in the Game (2005)	The Battle: Live at Smoke (2005)	Gentle Ballads II (2006)

The Battle: Live at Smoke is an album by saxophonists Vincent Herring and Eric Alexander which was recorded in 2005 and released on the Highnote label.

== Reception ==
Professional ratings
Review scores
Source	Rating
AllMusic	4/5 stars
All About Jazz	5/5 stars

AllMusic reviewed the album stating "Tenor saxophonist Eric Alexander and alto saxophonist Vincent Herring pair up for two nights of fireworks at Smoke ... unlike the various two-tenor battles that have appeared on numerous releases over the decades, the contrast provided by featuring two different reeds is easier on one's ears". JazzTimes said "For listeners familiar with classic recorded saxophone battles of the past-Gene Ammons and Sonny Stitt, Dexter Gordon and Wardell Gray, “Lockjaw” Davis and Johnny Griffin-this one is of equal stature, with more modern harmonies on display". On All About Jazz Alain Londes noted "Eric Alexander is one of the most hardworking and serious young tenor saxophone players out there ... This recording, taped live at Smoke in New York, finds him joined by the equally talented Vincent Herring on alto sax ... Since Alexander and Herring play different instruments, the final exchanges between the two demonstrate their ability to feed off, rather than upstage each other. In that sense these two musicians are not engaged in an actual battle, but rather a motivational exercise that puts them both at the top of their game".

== Track listing ==
1. "Blues Up and Down" (Gene Ammons, Sonny Stitt) – 12:49
2. "Road Song" (Wes Montgomery) – 10:48
3. "Firm Roots" (Cedar Walton) – 9:37
4. "Ritual Dance" (Carl Allen) – 8:08
5. "Shirley's Song" (Mike LeDonne) – 11:07
6. "Eleven Years" (Mike LeDonne) – 8:01

== Personnel ==
- Vincent Herring – alto saxophone
- Eric Alexander – tenor saxophone
- Mike LeDonne – piano
- John Webber – bass
- Carl Allen – drums
