= Dena DeRose =

American jazz pianist, singer and educator

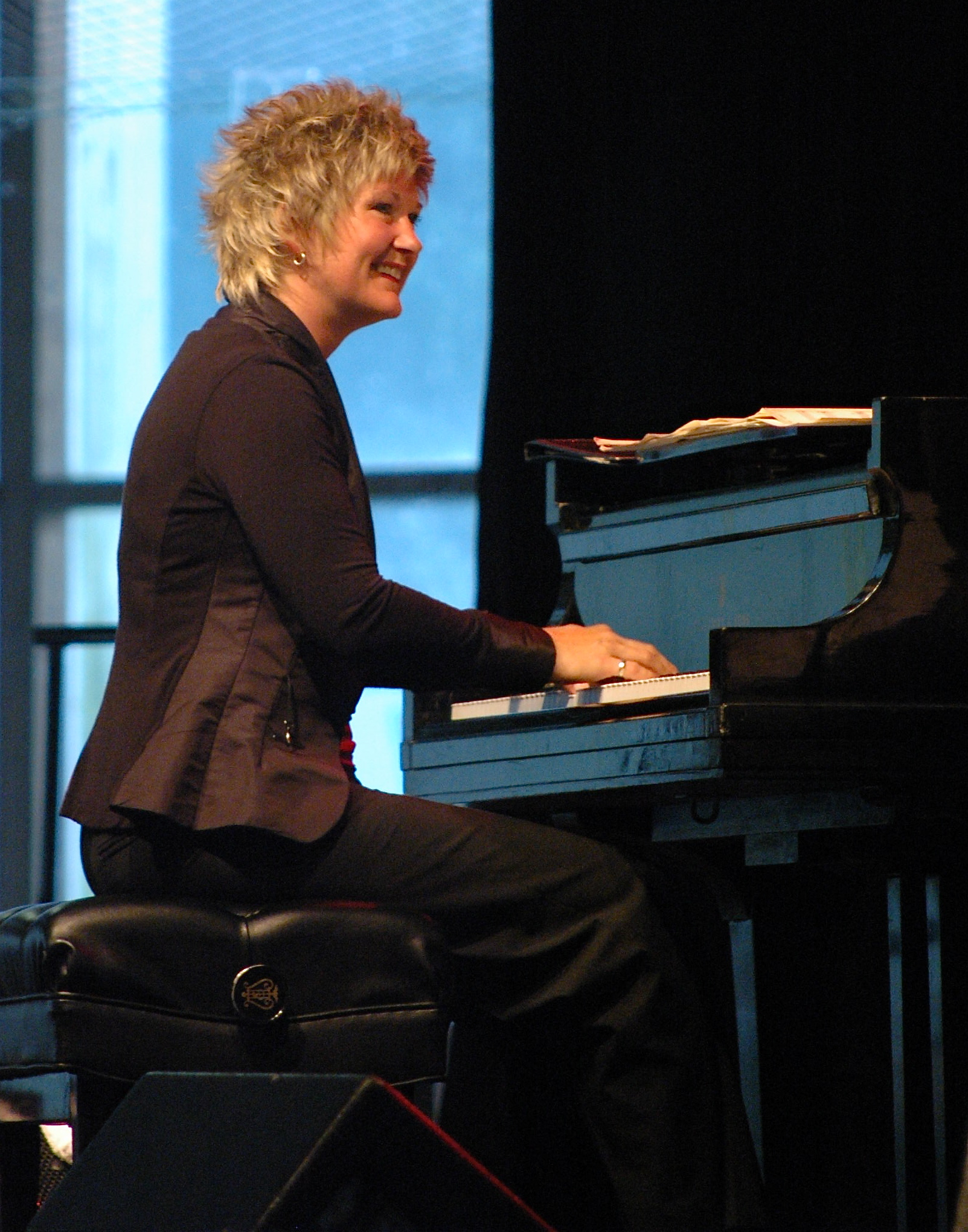
- Dena DeRose at the Litchfield Jazz festival in 2009, taken by Ed Newman

Background information
- Born: February 15, 1966 (age 59); Binghamton, New York, U.S.
- Genres: Jazz
- Occupation: Musician
- Instrument(s): Vocals, piano
- Years active: 1985–present
- Labels: Sharp Nine, Maxjazz
- Website: denaderose.com

Dena DeRose (born February 15, 1966) is an American jazz pianist, singer and educator. Although she began her career just as a pianist, medical problems with her hand forced her to become a vocalist as well. She has released seven solo albums.

== Biography ==
=== Early life ===
DeRose was born in Binghamton, New York to a construction worker and a former professional ice skater with the Ice Capades. She began playing the piano at age three and soon became a fan of jazz. As a child she also played the organ and percussion, and played the piano in school bands. When she was a teenager, she used to drive to New York City to see jazz musicians like Hank Jones and Mulgrew Miller. After high school, DeRose was offered a scholarship to Concordia College but chose to attend Binghamton University instead. At age 18, DeRose joined a popular local top forty band playing electric piano and synthesizer. She also began to sing vocal harmony parts with the band's vocalist. At 21, DeRose was diagnosed with carpal tunnel syndrome and arthritis. Suffering severe pain in her right hand, she was forced to stop playing the piano. Not performing for close to a year she became depressed and turned to drugs and alcohol to help her cope. One night she was in a bar listening to Doug Beardsley's trio when someone suggested that she get up and sing. From then she sang regularly with Beardsley's trio in Binghamton. After approximately another 18 months, she had two surgeries on her right hand which enabled her to begin playing the piano again. She moved to New York City in 1991 to further her career.

=== Recording career ===
She released her debut album Introducing Dena DeRose on Amosaya Records in 1995 and a year later renegotiated with the Sharp Nine label. The album included jazz standards "Blue Skies", "How Deep Is the Ocean?" and "Ev'ry Time We Say Goodbye". Scott Yanow for AllMusic called the album "an impressive beginning". Her second album, Another World, was released in 1998 with a septet of musicians including Steve Davis, Steve Wilson, Ingrid Jensen, and Daniel Sadownick. Tracks included standards "Spring Is Here" and "In the Wee Small Hours of the Morning", and "Don't Go", which was composed by DeRose. She released two more albums on Sharp Nine, I Can See Clearly Now (2000) and Love's Holiday (2002) before moving to MAXJAZZ. Her first album on MAXJAZZ, and her fifth in all, was 2005's A Walk in the Park which featured a trio... that started working together a few years before and would go on to perform together on and off for the next dozen years...with bassist Martin Wind and drummer Matt Wilson. It included versions of Duke Ellington's "The Lonely Ones", John Lennon's "Imagine" and Cole Porter's "I Concentrate on You". She has worked with Gene Bertoncini, Ray Brown, Jay Clayton, John Clayton, Bruce Forman, Benny Golson, Wycliffe Gordon, Jeff Hamilton, Billy Hart, Bill Henderson, Mark Murphy, Judy Niemack, Ken Peplowski, Houston Person, Alex Riel, Marvin Stamm, Clark Terry, and Steve Turre.

== Teaching ==
DeRose has been the Vocal Professor and Head of Jazz Vocals at the University of Music and Dramatic Arts in Graz, Austria, since 2006. A regular teacher at the Stanford Jazz Workshop for the past 20 years, she also teaches periodically at other summer camp and workshop programs including the Litchfield Summer Camp, Taller de Musics in Spain and the Prince Claus Conservatoire in Groningen, Holland.

== Discography ==
Year recorded	Title	Label	Notes
1995; 1998	Introducing Dena DeRose	Amosaya; Sharp Nine	With Steve Wilson (alto sax, soprano sax), Michael Zisman (bass), Albert "Tootie" Heath (drums)
1999	Another World	Sharp Nine	With Ingrid Jensen (trumpet, flugelhorn), Steve Davis (trombone), Steve Wilson (alto sax, soprano sax), Dwayne Burno (bass), Mark Taylor (drums), Daniel Sadownick (percussion)
1999	Time After Time	Ferony Enterprises	Duet, with Doug Ferony (vocal)
2000	I Can See Clearly Now	Sharp Nine	With Jim Rotondi (trumpet), Joel Frahm (tenor sax, soprano sax), Joe Locke (vibraphone), Dwayne Burno (bass), Mark Taylor (drums), Matt Wilson (drums)
2002	Love's Holiday	Sharp Nine	With Jim Rotondi (trumpet), Brian Lynch (trumpet), Tony Kadleck (trumpet, flugelhorn), Steve Davis (trombone), Sara Della Posta (French horn), Joe Locke (vibraphone), Peter Washington (bass), Matt Wilson (drums), plus special guest: Bill Charlap (piano on one track)
2005	A Walk in the Park	Maxjazz	Trio, with Martin Wind (bass), Matt Wilson (drums)
2006	The Nearness of Two [live]	GoFour [italy]	Duet, with Marvin Stamm (trumpet)
2007	Live at Jazz Standard, Vol. 1	Maxjazz	Trio, with Martin Wind (bass), Matt Wilson (drums), plus guest: Joel Frahm (tenor sax); in concert
2007 [2008]	Live at Jazz Standard, Vol. 2	Maxjazz	Trio, with Martin Wind (bass), Matt Wilson (drums); in concert
2010 [2012]	Travelin' Light	Maxjazz	Solo; in concert
2014	We Won't Forget You: An Homage to Shirley Horn	HighNote	With Martin Wind (bass), Matt Wilson (drums), plus guests: Jeremy Pelt (trumpet), Eric Alexander (tenor sax), Gary Smulyan (baritone sax)
2015 [2016]	United	HighNote	With Martin Wind (bass), Matt Wilson (drums), plus guests: Ingrid Jensen (trumpet), Peter Bernstein (guitar)
2015 [2016]	La Rosita [live]	DiscMedi Blau [spain]	With Scott Hamilton (tenor sax), Ignasi González (bass), Jo Krause (drums)
2020	Ode to the Road	HighNote	With Martin Wind (bass), Matt Wilson (drums), plus guests: Jeremy Pelt (trumpet), Houston Person (tenor sax), Sheila Jordan (vocal)
