= Folklore (disambiguation) =

Folklore is a body of expressive culture shared by a particular group of people.

Folklore may also refer to:

== Music ==
- Folklore (Jorge Cafrune album), 1962
- Folklore (16 Horsepower album), 2002
- Folklore (Nelly Furtado album), 2003
- Folklore (Big Big Train album), 2016
- Folklore (Taylor Swift album), 2020
- Folklore: The Long Pond Studio Sessions (From the Disney+ Special), a 2020 live soundtrack album featuring songs from the Taylor Swift studio album
- Folklore: Live at the Village Vanguard, a 1994 Vincent Herring album
- "Folk Lore", a 1985 song by Hüsker Dü from New Day Rising
- Prestige Folklore, a subsidiary label of Prestige Records

== Other uses ==
- Folklore (journal), the journal of The Folklore Society
- Folklore (TV series), a 2018 HBO Asia television series
- Folklore (video game), a 2007 PlayStation 3 video game
- Folklore (horse), a retired American Thoroughbred racehorse
- Folklore: The Long Pond Studio Sessions, a 2020 documentary concert film by Taylor Swift, or its associated live album
- TVR Folclor, a Romanian television channel

== See also ==
- American Folklore Society, a US-based professional association for folklorists
- American Folklore Theatre, former name of Northern Sky Theater, a theater company in Wisconsin
- The Folklore Society, a UK association for the study of folklore
- Folklore studies
- Mathematical folklore or folk mathematics, the body of theorems, definitions, proofs, or mathematical facts or techniques that circulate among mathematicians by word of mouth but have not appeared in print
