= Split Decision (album) =

Live album by Eric Alexander and Vincent Herring
- Released: August 22, 2025
- Recorded: July 4–6, 2024
- Venues: Smoke Jazz & Supper Club, NYC
- Genre: Jazz
- Length: 43:29
- Label: Smoke Sessions
- Producers: Paul Stache, Damon Smith

Eric Alexander chronology
Chicago to New York (2024)	Split Decision (2025)	Like Sugar (2025)

Vincent Herring chronology
Soul Jazz (2023)	Split Decision (2025)

Split Decision is an album by saxophonists Eric Alexander and Vincent Herring, which was recorded in 2024 and released the following year on the Smoke Sessions label.

== Reception ==
Professional ratings
Review scores
Source	Rating
DownBeat	4.5/5 stars
Jazzwise	4/5 stars
The Times	4/5 stars

DownBeat reviewed the album stating "these are two of the finest saxophonists on the jazz scene tearing it up in a fun, friendly format that still leaves plenty of room for 'Don't try this at home' antics ... they are so at ease with each other, instinctively knowing just the right moves to make ... this is one of those 'Wish you were there' live recordings that oozes with the juices of a rollicking jazz club showdown". Jazzwise said "this reunion of two energetic and competitive saxophonists lets you know they mean business ... this is brilliant small band playing, as it should be, live in a club, playing off one another and the thoroughly appreciative audience". On The Times, Chris Pearson noted "this is the kind of jazz album you might think they don't make any more. Two saxophonists in a club going head to head on a solid selection of tunes: blues, contrafacts and classics. It's the third time the Illinois tenorman Eric Alexander and the Kentucky altoist Vincent Herring have done this on record so by now it's not so much a cutting contest, more a genial joust as they spark off each other with a hotshot piano-led trio".

== Track listing ==
No.	Title	Length
1.	"Pharoah's Dance" (by Steve Turre)	8:25
2.	"Strollin'" (by Horace Silver)	7:11
3.	"A Peck a Sec" (by Hank Mobley)	6:06
4.	"My Romance" (by Richard Rodgers, Lorenz Hart)	9:35
5.	"Soft Impressions" (by Hank Mobley)	8:26
6.	"Mo's Theme" (by Rob Bargad)	3:46
Total length:		43:29

== Personnel ==
- Vincent Herring – alto saxophone
- Eric Alexander – tenor saxophone
- Mike LeDonne – piano
- John Webber – bass
- Lewis Nash – drums
