= Hard Times (Vincent Herring album) =

2017 album by Vincent Herring

Studio album by Vincent Herring
- Released: November 3, 2017
- Recorded: May 30, 2017
- Studio: Sear Sound, Studio C, New York City
- Genre: Jazz
- Length: 69:35
- Label: Smoke Sessions
- Producer: Paul Stache, Damon Smith

Vincent Herring chronology
Night and Day (2015)	Hard Times (2017)	Bird at 100 (2019)

Hard Times is an album by saxophonist Vincent Herring, which was recorded in 2017 and released on the Smoke Sessions label.

== Reception ==
Professional ratings
Review scores
Source	Rating
DownBeat	3.5/5 stars

DownBeat reviewed the album stating,

Hard Times is easy to take. The tempos bob along in a relaxed sway but don’t inhibit Herring’s splashy whirlpools of elegant double-time embroideries. In different ways, he walks in the footsteps of Cannonball Adderley—figuratively in the stylistic sense, and literally as part of the Nat Adderley group in the ’90s ... Like many of Herring’s past projects, this one welcomes us with a few familiar handshakes we all know.

== Track listing ==
1. "Hard Work" (John Handy) – 4:43
2. "Use Me" (Bill Withers) – 5:47
3. "Summertime" (George Gershwin, Ira Gershwin) – 4:36
4. "Hard Times" (Paul Mitchell) – 5:07
5. "Embraceable You" (George Gershwin, Ira Gershwin) – 5:26
6. "Eastern Joy Dance" (Mulgrew Miller) – 7:54
7. "The Sun Will Rise Again" (Vincent Herring) – 6:49
8. "Picadilly Square" (Carl Allen) – 4:59
9. "Good Morning Heartache" (Irene Higginbotham, Ervin Drake, Dan Fisher) – 7:27
10. "Amsterdam After Dark" (George Coleman) – 7:32
11. "Phineas" (Donald Brown) – 9:15

== Personnel ==
- Vincent Herring – alto saxophone
- Cyrus Chestnut – piano
- Yasushi Nakamura – bass
- Carl Allen – drums
- Nicolas Bearde – vocals (tracks 2, 3 & 5)
- Russell Malone – guitar (tracks 1, 2 & 7)
- Steve Turre – trombone (tracks 1–4 & 8–11)
- Brad Mason – trumpet (tracks 1–4, 8 & 9)
- Sam Dillon – tenor saxophone (tracks 1–4, 8 & 9)
