= Sharoni =

Sharoni (Hebrew: שרוני) is a surname of Hebrew origin. Notable people with the surname include:

- Benny Sharoni, Israeli-American saxophonist
- Moshe Sharoni (1929 - 2020), Israeli politician
- Simona Sharoni (born 1961), Romanian-Israeli feminist scholar
