= One for All (band) =

American jazz band

- Origin: New York City
- Genres: Jazz
- Years active: 1997–present
- Labels: Sharp Nine, Criss Cross, Smoke Sessions
- Members: Eric Alexander; Jim Rotondi; Steve Davis; David Hazeltine; John Webber; Joe Farnsworth

One for All is a jazz sextet formed in 1997. The band comprises Eric Alexander (tenor saxophone), Jim Rotondi (trumpet), Steve Davis (trombone), David Hazeltine (piano), John Webber (bass) and Joe Farnsworth (drums). The band has been compared to 1960s-era Blue Note jazz and Art Blakey's Jazz Messengers.

== History ==
The group was formed in 1997 for an engagement at Smalls Jazz Club and recorded its first album, Too Soon To Tell, for Sharp Nine later that year. Alexander, Rotondi, and Farnsworth had all been acquainted in New York City as far back as 1988, and Farnsworth introduced Davis to the other musicians. Hazeltine and Peter Washington began performing with the former four players in 1996 at the jazz club Augie's, which would later be re-opened as Smoke. Washington was replaced by John Webber, and the band has since signed to the Criss Cross label. The name One for All was taken from the final album by the Jazz Messengers.

== Critical reception ==
Critic David Adler of JazzTimes has called One for All "New York's premier hard-bop supergroup," while Matt Collar at AllMusic called the band "one of the foremost mainstream jazz ensembles to come out of the '90s."

== Discography ==
- Too Soon to Tell (Sharp Nine, 1997)
- Optimism (Sharp Nine, 1998)
- Upward and Onward (Criss Cross, 1999)
- The Long Haul (Criss Cross, 2000)
- The End of a Love Affair (Venus, 2001)
- Live at Smoke, Volume 1 (Criss Cross, 2001)
- Wide Horizons (Criss Cross, 2002)
- No Problem: Tribute to Art Blakey (Venus, 2003)
- Blueslike (Criss Cross, 2003)
- Killer Joe (Venus, 2005)
- The Lineup (Sharp Nine, 2006)
- What's Going On (Venus, 2007)
- Return of the Lineup (Sharp Nine, 2008)
- Incorrigible (Jazz Legacy Productions, 2009)
- Invades Vancouver! (Live at The Cellar) (Cellar Live, 2010)
- The Third Decade (Smoke Sessions, 2016)
- Big George (Smoke Sessions, 2024) with guest: George Coleman
