= Mike DiRubbo =

American jazz musician (born 1970)

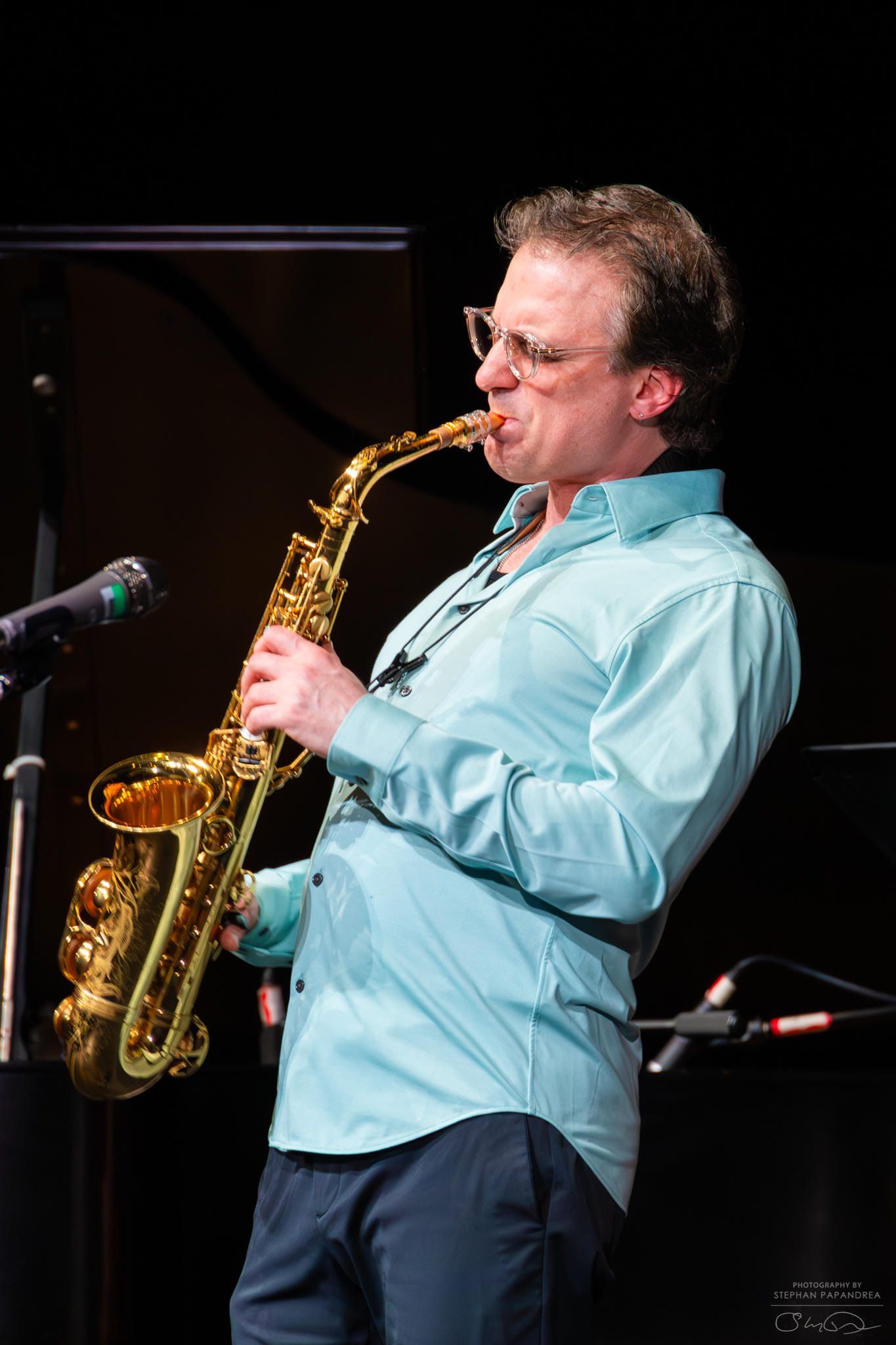

Background information
- Born: July 25, 1970 (age 56); New Haven, Connecticut, USA
- Genre: Jazz
- Occupations: Musician, composer
- Instruments: Alto and soprano saxophone
- Website: www.mikedirubbo.com

Mike DiRubbo is an American alto saxophonist and soprano saxophonist, bandleader, composer and educator. DiRubbo is based in New York City where he has made a career for himself in the field of jazz, establishing himself as a player firmly rooted in the Post-bop idiom. DiRubbo's sound on alto saxophone was heavily influenced by tenor saxophonists Dexter Gordon and John Coltrane. He has released 10 albums as a leader and has performed and recorded as a sideman with Steve Davis, Mario Pavone, Al Foster, Jim Rotondi, Joe Farnsworth, Jimmy Cobb, George Coleman, Larry Willis and Harold Mabern.

== Early years ==
DiRubbo was born and raised in New Haven, CT. He started playing the clarinet in the 4th grade. He began his tutelage on alto saxophone with master jazz saxophonist and educator Jackie McLean. In 1988 he received both academic and performance scholarships to attend college at the Jackie McLean Institute of Jazz, Hartt School, University of Hartford. DiRubbo graduated with a Bachelor of Music in 1992 and later earned a Master of Music in 2018 from State University of New York at Purchase.

== Career ==
=== 1990s ===
Jackie McLean had a profound impact on DiRubbo who remained in Connecticut after college. During this time he also found common ground with trombonist and composer Steve Davis with whom he would collaborate throughout his professional career.

In 1995 DiRubbo moved to New York City where he maintained a creative affiliation with Davis. Between 1995 and 1998 DiRubbo recorded The Jaunt, Crossfire and Vibe Up as a sideman for Davis on his landmark albums for Criss Cross. And in 1994 Davis was sideman along with Bruce Barth, Nat Reeves and Carl Allen on DiRubbo's “From the Inside Out” session.

DiRubbo released "From the Inside Out", his first album as a leader, in 1999. Noting the young alto players kinship to mentor McLean, music reviewer Joel Roberts wrote, "Like McLean, DiRubbo pursues a mostly straight-ahead style with a clear respect for the jazz tradition, but doesn't always bow allegiance to the expected post-bop gods."

From the mid to late 1990s, DiRubbo found his community in New York City, working with drummer Joe Farnsworth and other likeminded musicians.

=== 2000s ===
Throughout the 2000s DiRubbo continued to forge strong ties with his colleague Steve Davis. He also began fruitful partnerships with trumpeter Jim Rotondi and bassist Mario Pavone. In 2001 he played on Totem Blues as a member of Pavone's Octet.

After recording Rotondi’s Reverence for Criss Cross Records in 2000, DiRubbo signed a recording contract with the label for which he recorded, Keep Steppin’ in 2001 and Human Spirit in 2002.

In the mid-2000s DiRubbo employed drummer Tony Reedus, pianist Harold Mabern and bassist Dwayne Burno as his primary working quartet. The group recorded New York Accent, live in New York City at Kitano. This group was modified with the vibraphonist Steve Nelson replacing pianist Harold Mabern on his 2009 release, Repercussion.

In the 2010s DiRubbo continued performing regularly as a sideman, recording Images and Gettin’ it Done for Steve Davis and The Move with Jim Rotondi. In 2011 DiRubbo also began working in the various groups of keyboardist Brian Charette, recording three albums with him on Steeplechase Records. He also joined trumpeter Joe Magnarelli's group with whom he recorded Three On Two.

After releasing Chronos in 2011 DiRubbo started his own label, Ksanti Records on which he released a duo album with pianist Larry Willis, Four Hands, One Heart, in 2011 and a quintet session, Threshold in 2014.

In 2018 DiRubbo recorded Live At Smalls. In a 2019 Downbeat Magazine feature, Ken Micallef wrote, "The quartet acquits itself well on DiRubbo’s material, but it’s the leader’s penetrating tone and intense delivery that draws you in".

DiRubbo released Inner Light on Truth Revolution Recording Collective in 2023. Inner Light was in the JazzWeek chart Top 50 for 7 weeks and reached #35.

== Teaching ==
- 1997–present, Litchfield Jazz Festival, Jazz Camp

== Honorable mentions ==
- 1988 Louis Armstrong Music Award, Notre Dame High School, CT
- 2013-2024 Critic's Poll, Rising Star, Alto Saxophone, Downbeat Magazine

== Discography ==
=== As leader ===
- 1999 From the Inside Out (Sharp Nine Records)
- 2001 Keep Steppin' (Criss Cross Jazz)
- 2003 Human Spirit (Criss Cross Jazz)
- 2007 New York Accent (Cellar Live)
- 2009 Repercussion (Positone Records)
- 2011 Chronos (Positone Records)
- 2011 Four Hands, One Heart, Mike DiRubbo/Larry Willis (Ksanti Records)
- 2014 Threshold (Ksanti Records)
- 2018 Live at Smalls (Smalls Live)
- 2023 Inner Light (Truth Revolution Records)
- 2026 Way Out Northwest (Cellar Music)

=== As sideman ===
- 1995 The Jaunt, Steve Davis Sextet (Criss Cross Jazz)
- 1997 Crossfire!, Steve Davis Sextet (Criss Cross Jazz)
- 1998 Vibe Up!, Steve Davis Sextet (Criss Cross Jazz)
- 1999 States, Andrew Adair Sextet (Fresh Sound)
- 2000 Seventh Sign, Mary DiPaola-Davis Quintet
- 2001 The Returnsman, Craig Wuepper Quintet (Double Time Jazz)
- 2001 Totem Blues, Mario Pavone Octet (Knitting Factory Records)
- 2001 Reverence, Jim Rotundi (Criss Cross Jazz)
- 2002 Systems Blue, Steve Davis Quintet (Criss Cross Jazz)
- 2008 Peaceful Moments, Emiko Ohara
- 2008 Outlook, Steve Davis (Positone Records)
- 2008 Blueprint, Lauren Sevian (Inner Circle Music)
- 2008 New York Callin', Hiromi Kasuga
- 2009 Live at Smalls, Steve Davis (Smalls Live)
- 2010 Images, Steve Davis (Positone Records)
- 2010 Steeplechase Jam, Volume 29, Assorted Artists (SteepleChase Records)
- 2010 The Move, Jim Rotundi (Criss Cross Jazz)
- 2011 Learning to Count, Brian Charette (SteepleChase Records)
- 2011 Ganbare Nippon, Dezron Douglas (Venus Records)
- 2012 Music for Organ Sextet, Brian Charette (SteepleChase Records)
- 2012 Gettin' it Done, Steve Davis (Positone Records)
- 2012 Trio, Pavone/DiRubbo/Sorey
- 2014 The Question That Drives Us, Brian Charette (SteepleChase Records)
- 2015 Three On Two, Joe Magnarelli (Positone Records)
- 2015 All Together Now, Tom Tallitsch (Positone Records)
- 2019 New Chordtet, Peter McEachern (TRR Collective)
- 2020 Power From the Air, Brian Charette (SteepleChase Records)
- 2021 Isabella, Mario Pavone Tampa Quartet (Clean Feed Records)
- 2022 Resurgence, George Coleman Jr
- 2024 Where is Love, Abena Koomson-Davis (WJ3 Records)
