= Split decision (disambiguation) =

A split decision is a type of win in combat sports.

Split decision(s) may also refer to:

- Split Decision (album), 2025 album by Eric Alexander and Vincent Herring
- Split Decision (EP), 2023 EP by Dave and Central Cee
- Split Decisions, a 1988 boxing film
- "Split Decision", a 1985 episode of Care Bears
- "Split Decision", a 2004 episode from the first season of NCIS
- Split Decision, a pricing game from The Price Is Right
- "Split Decisions", an episode of the TV series Mickey Mouse
