= The Uptown Shuffle =

2014 album by Vincent Herring

Live album by Vincent Herring
- Released: February 4, 2014
- Recorded: April 26 – 27, 2013
- Venue: Smoke Jazz & Supper Club, New York City
- Genre: Jazz
- Length: 68:26
- Label: Smoke Sessions
- Producer: Paul Stache

Vincent Herring chronology
In the Spirit of Coltrane and Cannonball (2012)	The Uptown Shuffle (2014)	Night and Day (2015)

The Uptown Shuffle is an album by saxophonist Vincent Herring, which was recorded in 2013 and released the following year on the Smoke Sessions label.

== Reception ==
Professional ratings
Review scores
Source	Rating
Jazzwise	3/5 stars

Jazzwise reviewed the album stating, "the ex-Nat Adderley sideman plays a fiery Jackie Mclean-ish alto here in a quartet including the hard swinging, classy pianist Cyrus Chestnut".

== Track listing ==
1. "Elation" (Vincent Herring) – 7:31
2. "Love Walked In" (George Gershwin, Ira Gershwin) – 5:47
3. "Tenderly" (Walter Gross, Jack Lawrence) – 10:18
4. "Uptown Shuffle" (Cyrus Chestnut) – 7:57
5. "The Atholete" (Tex Allen) – 7:49
6. "Polka Dots and Moonbeams" (Jimmy Van Heusen, Johnny Burke) – 8:17
7. "Strike Up The Band" (George Gershwin, Ira Gershwin) – 7:22
8. "Don't Let It Go" (Vincent Herring) – 9:10
9. "Big Bertha" (Duke Pearson) – 4:15

== Personnel ==
- Vincent Herring – alto saxophone
- Cyrus Chestnut – piano
- Brandi Disterheft – bass
- Joe Farnsworth – drums
