= The Old Country (album) =

Studio album by Nat Adderley Quintet featuring Vincent Herring
- Released: 1991
- Recorded: December 5–6, 1990
- Studio: Clinton Recording Studio, NYC
- Genre: Jazz
- Length: 57:16
- Label: Alfa; ALCR 101
- Producer: Makoto Kimata

Nat Adderley chronology
Talkin' About You (1990)	The Old Country (1991)	Workin' (1992)

The Old Country is an album by Nat Adderley's Quintet recorded in 1990 and originally released on the Japanese Alfa label before being re-released on Enja Records.

== Reception ==
Professional ratings
Review scores
Source	Rating
The Penguin Guide to Jazz	3.5/4 stars
AllMusic	2.5/5 stars

in the Penguin Guide to Jazz is this writeup: "Genus and Drummond do a marvellous job ... and the two horns are well synchronised and brightly registered". In his review for AllMusic, Ron Wynn stated, "Adderley has evidently found a soul mate in alto saxophonist Vince Herring, with whom he works once more on this 1990 date. Herring's voice has grown more impressive with each release, and he now offers more than just dazzling lines and phrases; he's constructing and completing confident statements."

== Track listing ==
1. "The Old Country" (Nat Adderley) – 6:47
2. "Bohemia After Dark" (Oscar Pettiford) – 5:57
3. "Jeannine" (Duke Pearson) – 9:32
4. "Almost Always" (Vincent Herring) – 4:43
5. "Love for Sale" (Cole Porter) – 5:45
6. "One for Daddy-O" (Adderley) – 5:55
7. "Stella by Starlight" (Victor Young, Ned Washington) – 6:40
8. "The Chant" (Victor Feldman) – 5:41
9. "Nippon Soul" (Cannonball Adderley) – 6:23

== Personnel ==
- Nat Adderley – cornet
- Vincent Herring – alto saxophone
- Rob Bargad – piano
- James Genus – bass
- Billy Drummond – drums
