= On the Move (Nat Adderley album) =

Live album by Nat Adderley Quintet
- Released: 1983
- Recorded: October 1982
- Venue: Keystone Korner, San Francisco, CA
- Genre: Jazz
- Length: 56:26
- Label: Theresa TR 117
- Producer: Nat Addderley

Nat Adderley chronology
A Little New York Midtown Music (1978)	On the Move (1983)	Blue Autumn (1983)

On the Move is a live album by Nat Adderley's Quintet, recorded in 1982 and released on the Theresa label.

== Reception ==
Professional ratings
Review scores
Source	Rating
AllMusic	2.5/5 stars
The Penguin Guide to Jazz	3/4 stars
The Rolling Stone Jazz Record Guide	3/5 stars

The Penguin Guide to Jazz states, "The group as a whole is very strong and while there may be quibbles about the sound quality ... there are none whatsoever about the music". In his review for AllMusic, Ron Wynn stated that "neither Adderley nor pianist Larry Willis, who supplied half the date's songs, were in top form. Willis played some nice melodies but did not offer much during his solos, while Adderley was plagued by sloppy articulation. However, the work of Fortune, who has not recorded nearly often enough, salvages things somewhat".

== Track listing ==
All compositions by Nat Adderley except as indicated

1. "Malandro" (Larry Willis) - 12:11
2. "The Boy With the Sad Eyes" - 7:57
3. "To Wisdom the Prize" (Willis) - 10:14
4. "Naturally" - 7:00
5. "The Scene" - 4:34
6. "Come in out of the Rain" (Willis) - 14:30 Bonus track on CD reissue

== Personnel ==
- Nat Adderley - cornet
- Sonny Fortune - alto saxophone
- Larry Willis - piano
- Walter Booker - bass
- Jimmy Cobb - drums
