= Alexander the Great (Eric Alexander album) =

Studio album by Eric Alexander
- Released: 2000
- Recorded: May 8, 1997
- Studio: Van Gelder Studio, Englewood Cliffs, NJ
- Genre: Jazz
- Length: 55:44
- Label: HighNote; HCD 7013
- Producer: Charles Earland

Eric Alexander chronology
Man with a Horn (1997)	Alexander the Great (2000)	Heavy Hitters (1998)

Alexander the Great is an album by saxophonist Eric Alexander which was recorded in 1997 and released on the HighNote label in 2000.

== Reception ==
Professional ratings
Review scores
Source	Rating
Allmusic	4/5 stars

In his review on Allmusic, Michael G. Nastos states "The combination of tenor saxophonist Alexander, trumpeter Jim Rotundi, guitarist Peter Bernstein and drummer Joe Farnsworth has yielded great results, with the collective One for All and their own individual bands. Their longstanding association with organ master Charles Earland unfortunately ends with this CD, as Earland has passed away. So this is their last chance to cook with the Mighty Burner, and they do it up right. Although this is Alexander's date, all five take equal roles in this effort". On All About Jazz, David A. Orthmann said "In contrast to Alexander’s regular, straight-ahead fare as a leader for a number of record labels, Alexander the Great pretty much sticks to the formula of Earland’s popular recordings for Muse and HighNote, with an emphasis on funk and soul grooves". In JazzTimes, Miles Jordan wrote "Alexander is in the tradition of Windy City tenormen, and it’s entirely appropriate that he’s reunited here with B-3 boss Charles Earland, with whom he earned a name for himself after landing in Chicago about 10 years ago ... Recorded just three months after the hornmen guested on the late Earland’s Blowing the Blues 1997 HighNote CD, the three principals continue the mood established there".

== Track listing ==
All compositions by Eric Alexander except where noted

1. "Burner's Waltz" – 7:32
2. "Let's Stay Together" (Al Green, Al Jackson Jr., Willie Mitchell) – 6:00
3. "God Bless the Child" (Billie Holiday, Arthur Herzog Jr.) – 6:31
4. "Explosion" – 8:11
5. "Through the Fire" (David Foster, Tom Keane, Cynthia Weil) – 5:24
6. "Soft Winds" (Benny Goodman, Fred Royal) – 8:13
7. "Born to Be Blue" (Robert Wells, Mel Tormé) – 5:57
8. "Carrot Cake" (Peter Bernstein) – 7:56

== Personnel ==
- Eric Alexander – tenor saxophone
- Charles Earland – Hammond B3 organ
- Peter Bernstein – guitar
- Joe Farnsworth – drums
- James Rotondi – trumpet (tracks 1–2, 4–6, 8)
