= Ends and Means (album) =

Studio album by Vincent Herring
- Released: March 14, 2006
- Recorded: June 2005
- Studio: Knoop Music, River Edge, NJ
- Genre: Jazz
- Length: 57:04
- Label: HighNote; HCD 7149
- Producer: Vincent Herring

Vincent Herring chronology
The Battle: Live at Smoke (2005)	Ends and Means (2006)	Morning Star (2010)

Ends and Means is an album by saxophonist Vincent Herring which was recorded in 2005 and released on the Highnote label the following year.

== Reception ==
Professional ratings
Review scores
Source	Rating
Allmusic	4/5 stars
All About Jazz	4/5 stars
All About Jazz	5/5 stars
The Penguin Guide to Jazz Recordings	3/4 stars

Allmusic reviewed the album stating "For this 2005 studio session, Vincent Herring switches to a rhythm section that he had previously worked with exclusively in Europe ... Highly recommended". JazzTimes said "This is a thoroughly enjoyable record: memorable melodies, a top-notch rhythm section and a saxophonist who plays his instrument like a man who’s having a good time. Vincent Herring was a protégé of Nat Adderley, and you can hear Cannonball in Herring’s nice round tone and soulful approach". On All About Jazz Edward Zucker noted "Where Herring once sounded like Cannonball Adderley, he has developed his own distinctive sound over the years, whether on alto or soprano. Herring was one of the young lions of the '80s and early '90s (although unfortunately underrated) and has matured into a respected leader in mainstream jazz ... Ends And Means is another excellent addition to his growing catalogue as a leader in the world of modern mainstream jazz". On the same site Nic Jones observed "Vincent Herring's association with HighNote has easily been the most productive of his career, in terms of documenting his growth as an artist. Where once he perhaps owed a debt of allegiance to the work of Cannonball Adderley, he now has the sound of a musician who has come into his own".

== Track listing ==
1. "Ends and Means" (Renato Chicco) – 7:57
2. "Tom Tom" (Joris Dudli) – 8:29
3. "The Song Is Ended" (Irving Berlin) – 6:28
4. "Stable Mates" (Benny Golson) – 6:04
5. "Norwegian Wood" (John Lennon, Paul McCartney) – 5:45
6. "Wingspan" (Mulgrew Miller) – 5:16
7. "Thoughts" (Joris Dudli) – 5:38
8. "Caravan" (Juan Tizol, Duke Ellington) – 11:27

== Personnel ==
- Vincent Herring – alto saxophone, soprano saxophone
- Jeremy Pelt – trumpet (tracks 3 & 6-8)
- Danny Grissett – piano
- Essiet Essiet – bass
- Joris Dudli – drums

=== Production ===
- Vincent Herring – producer
- Manfred Knoop – engineer
