= Seasoned Wood =

Studio album by Cedar Walton
- Released: July 15, 2008
- Recorded: February 1, 2008
- Studio: Van Gelder Studio, Englewood Cliffs, NJ
- Genre: Jazz
- Length: 51:49
- Label: HighNote; HCD 7185
- Producer: Don Sickler

Cedar Walton chronology
One Flight Down (2006)	Seasoned Wood (2008)	Voices Deep Within (2009)

Seasoned Wood is an album by pianist Cedar Walton which was recorded in 2008 and released on the Highnote label.

== Reception ==
Allmusic reviewed the album stating "At 74, Walton is as promising and as dizzying a bandleader as ever. His command of the hard bop and post-bop languages and his abilities to reinterpret well-known standards authoritatively are all remarkable... In sum, Seasoned Wood is a true and exceptional highlight in Walton's career". All About Jazz observed "The title Seasoned Wood may successfully riff on the artist's name and the artistry he brings to the occasion, but as anyone with a fireplace knows, seasoned wood burns hotter and better than regular wood. Indeed, Cedar Walton does so here". JazzTimes called it "primarily a take-no-prisoners quintet date".

Professional ratings
Review scores
Source	Rating
Allmusic	3.5/5 stars
All About Jazz	4/5 stars

== Track listing ==
All compositions by Cedar Walton except as indicated

1. "The Man I Love" (George Gershwin, Ira Gershwin) - 6:24
2. "Clockwise" - 7:17
3. "Longravity" (Jimmy Heath) - 5:58
4. "When Love Is New" - 6:04
5. "Hindsight" - 7:13
6. "A Nightingale Sang in Berkeley Square" (Eric Maschwitz, Manning Sherwin) - 5:39
7. "Plexus" - 6:02
8. "John's Blues" - 7:12

== Personnel ==
- Cedar Walton - piano
- Jeremy Pelt - trumpet, flugelhorn
- Vincent Herring - tenor saxophone
- Peter Washington - bass
- Al Foster - drums

=== Production ===
- Don Sickler - producer
- Rudy Van Gelder - engineer
