= We Remember Cannon =

Live album by Nat Adderley Quintet
- Released: 1991
- Recorded: November 18, 1989
- Venue: Moonwalker Club, Aarburg, Switzerland
- Genre: Jazz
- Length: 65:56
- Label: In + Out 7012
- Producer: Mike Hennessey

Nat Adderley chronology
Blue Autumn (1983)	We Remember Cannon (1991)	Autumn Leaves (1990)

We Remember Cannon is a live album by Nat Adderley's Quintet recorded in Switzerland in 1989 and released on the In + Out label.

== Reception ==
Professional ratings
Review scores
Source	Rating
The Penguin Guide to Jazz	3/4 stars
AllMusic	4/5 stars

The Penguin Guide to Jazz states "We Remember Cannon is pretty much state of the art for the late 80s band". In his review for AllMusic, Scott Yanow stated "Cornetist Nat Adderley is in better shape than usual on this spirited live date with his quintet ... there are plenty of witty and informative verbal introductions by Adderley to the audience about the songs, and the rhythm section is quite complementary. A worthy effort".

== Track listing ==
1. "I'll Remember April" (Gene de Paul, Patricia Johnston, Don Raye) – 10:12
2. "Unit 7" (Sam Jones) – 8:02
3. "Talkin' About You, Cannon" (Nat Adderley) – 6:51
4. "Work Song" (Adderley) – 6:35
5. "Soul Eyes" (Mal Waldron) – 10:35
6. "Stella by Starlight" (Victor Young, Ned Washington) – 9:54
7. "Autumn Leaves" (Joseph Kosma, Johnny Mercer, Jacques Prévert) – 13:51

== Personnel ==
- Nat Adderley – cornet
- Vincent Herring – alto saxophone
- Art Resnick – piano
- Walter Booker – bass
- Jimmy Cobb – drums
