= Work Song: Live at Sweet Basil =

Live album by Nat Adderley Sextet
- Released: 1993
- Recorded: May 12–13, 1990
- Venue: Sweet Basil, NYC
- Genre: Jazz
- Length: 45:37
- Label: Sweet Basil; 7312-2
- Producer: Horst Liepolt and Shigeyuki Kawashima

Nat Adderley chronology
Autumn Leaves (1990)	Work Song: Live at Sweet Basil (1993)	Talkin' About You (1990)

Work Song: Live at Sweet Basil is a live album by Nat Adderley's Quintet recorded at the Sweet Basil Jazz Club in 1990 and original released on the Sweet Basil label.

== Reception ==
Professional ratings
Review scores
Source	Rating
The Penguin Guide to Jazz	4/4 stars
AllMusic	2.5/5 stars

The Penguin Guide to Jazz states the set "'has some of the energy of its illustrous namesake, though the title track has its rough spots ... A thoroughly satisfying disc ".

== Track listing ==
1. "Work Song" (Nat Adderley) – 10:42
2. "High Fly" (Randy Weston) – 13:05
3. "In a Sentimental Mood" (Duke Ellington) – 10:51
4. "Jive Samba" (Adderley) – 10:59

== Personnel ==
- Nat Adderley – cornet
- Sonny Fortune, Vincent Herring – alto saxophone
- Rob Bargad – piano
- Walter Booker – bass
- Jimmy Cobb – drums
