= Autumn Leaves (Nat Adderley album) =

Live album by Nat Adderley Sextet
- Released: 1991
- Recorded: May 12–13, 1990
- Venue: Sweet Basil, NYC
- Genre: Jazz
- Length: 58:05
- Label: Evidence; 22102
- Producer: Horst Liepolt, Shigeyuki Kawashima

Nat Adderley chronology
We Remember Cannon (1989)	Autumn Leaves (1991)	Work Song: Live at Sweet Basil (1990)

Autumn Leaves (subtitled Live at Sweet Basil) is a live album by Nat Adderley's Quintet, recorded at the Sweet Basil Jazz Club in 1989 and released on the Sweet Basil label before being rereleased in the US on the Evidence label.

== Reception ==
Professional ratings
Review scores
Source	Rating
AllMusic	4.5/5 stars
The Penguin Guide to Jazz	3.5/4 stars

The Penguin Guide to Jazz states that the set "'has a leftovers feel". In his review for AllMusic, Scott Yanow stated, "Cornetist Nat Adderley is in excellent form on his live sextet set but he is somewhat overshadowed by his two altoists... The long solos are consistently inventive and colorful, making this an easily recommended Nat Adderley CD".

== Track listing ==
1. " Big P." (Jimmy Heath) – 12:51
2. "Autumn Leaves" (Joseph Kosma, Johnny Mercer, Jacques Prévert) – 20:24
3. "Yesterdays" (Jerome Kern, Otto Harbach) – 15:01
4. "For Duke and Cannon" (Sonny Fortune) – 9:47

== Personnel ==
- Nat Adderley – cornet
- Sonny Fortune, Vincent Herring – alto saxophone
- Rob Bargad – piano
- Walter Booker – bass
- Jimmy Cobb – drums
