= Mr. Wizard (Vincent Herring album) =

Studio album by Vincent Herring
- Released: April 27, 2004
- Recorded: December 10, 2003
- Studio: Eastside Sound, New York, NY
- Genre: Jazz
- Length: 49:27
- Label: HighNote; HCD 7121
- Producer: Vincent Herring

Vincent Herring chronology
All Too Real (2003)	Mr. Wizard (2004)	The Battle: Live at Smoke (2005)

Mr. Wizard is an album by saxophonist Vincent Herring which was recorded in 2003 and released on the HighNote label the following year.

== Reception ==
Professional ratings
Review scores
Source	Rating
AllMusic	4/5 stars
The Penguin Guide to Jazz Recordings	3.5/4 stars

AllMusic reviewed the album stating "Hard bop fans will want to snap up this delightful CD without hesitation". JazzTimes observed "Vincent Herring’s third album for HighNote demonstrates once again the altoist/sopranoist’s prodigious skill as an improviser in the hard bop/modal tradition ... Herring possesses a virtuoso technique and an acute ear that allow him to execute long, melodically and rhythmically complex lines without missing a note or a beat. And his full, expressive tone permits him to render the slower tunes with grace and feeling". All About Jazz noted "Vincent Herring has developed a foolproof prescription for making great records: employ compatible sidemen, choose appealing compositions and approach the music with zealous devotion. On Mr. Wizard the brilliant saxophonist follows this formula faultlessly and the result is another rewarding listening experience".

== Track listing ==
1. "All God's Chillun Got Rhythm" (Bronisław Kaper, Walter Jurmann, Gus Kahn) – 4:28
2. "Citizen of Zamunda" (Richie Goods) – 4:43
3. "Hopscotch" (Danny Grissett) – 4:05
4. "You Leave Me Breathless" (Friedrich Hollaender, Ralph Freed) – 5:04
5. "Four by Five" (McCoy Tyner) – 5:04
6. "Encounters" (Grissett) – 7:43
7. "Cassius" (Jeremy Pelt) – 5:21
8. "The Walk Home" (Pelt) – 7:19
9. "Mr. Wizard" (Vincent Herring) – 5:40

== Personnel ==
- Vincent Herring – alto saxophone, soprano saxophone
- Jeremy Pelt – trumpet (tracks 1, 3 & 5–9)
- Danny Grissett – piano
- Richie Goods – bass
- E.J. Strickland – drums

=== Production ===
- Vincent Herring – producer
- Lou Holtzman – engineer
