= Don't Look Back (Nat Adderley album) =

Studio album by Nat Adderley Septet
- Released: 1976
- Recorded: August 9, 1976
- Genre: Jazz
- Length: 48:23
- Label: SteepleChase; SCS 1059
- Producer: Nils Winther

Nat Adderley chronology
| Double Exposure (1975) | Don't Look Back (1976) | Hummin' (1976) |

Don't Look Back is an album by jazz cornetist Nat Adderley, recorded in 1976 and released on the Danish SteepleChase label and on Inner City Records in the US.

== Reception ==
Professional ratings
Review scores
| Source | Rating |
|---|---|
| AllMusic | 2.5/5 stars |
| The Penguin Guide to Jazz | 2.5/4 stars |

The Penguin Guide to Jazz states, "Adderley's reputation as a mainstream traditionalist takes a knock with sets like these. Unfortunately the results aren't by any means commensurate with the daring of the lineup... A bold effort but not quite there".

== Track listing ==
1. "Funny Funny" (Nat Adderley) – 6:10
2. "K. High" (Ira Buddy Williams) – 9:31
3. "Just a Quickie" (Fernando Gumbs) – 4:50
4. "I Think I Got It" (Onaje Allan Gumbs) – 6:58
5. "Home" (Ken McIntyre) – 6:30
6. "Don't Look Back" (Harold Vick) – 7:30
7. "Home" [take 1] (McIntyre) – 6:54 Bonus track on CD release

== Personnel ==
- Nat Adderley – cornet
- John Stubblefield – tenor saxophone, soprano saxophone
- Ken McIntyre – alto saxophone, bass clarinet, flute, oboe
- Onaje Allan Gumbs – piano, electric piano, clavinet
- Fernando Gumbs – bass
- Ira Buddy Williams – drums
- Victor See Yuen – congas, percussion
