= Men of Honor (Jeremy Pelt album) =

Studio album by Jeremy Pelt
- Released: January 26, 2010
- Recorded: August 11, 2009
- Studio: Van Gelder Studio, Englewood Cliffs, NJ
- Genre: Jazz
- Length: 45:53
- Label: HighNote; HCD 7203
- Producer: Jeremy Pelt

Jeremy Pelt chronology
November (2010)	Men of Honor (2010)	The Talented Mr. Pelt (2011)

Men of Honor is an album by trumpeter Jeremy Pelt which was recorded in 2009 and released on the HighNote label the following year.

== Reception ==
Professional ratings
Review scores
Source	Rating
Allmusic	4/5 stars
Jazzwise	4/5 stars

In his review on Allmusic, arwulf arwulf states "Men of Honor consists of a set of eight original compositions that brings to mind the coolly creative, mainstream, pre-electric works of Lee Morgan, Freddie Hubbard, and Miles Davis. It is a deliberately drawn salute to certain musical traditions established in the late '50s and early '60s which have endured and been extended by young artists enraptured by the harmonic poetics of early modern jazz ... This thoughtful, well-crafted music is recommended for relaxation on a foggy day, or intuitive navigation after dark". On All About Jazz, Joel Roberts noted "Heralded for years as one of the "rising stars" in jazz, Pelt has earned accolades for his staggering virtuosity ... While he's clearly the man in charge here, Men of Honor is very much a band-focused release, with all five members of the group contributing compositions (Pelt penned four of the tunes) and all five voices heard distinctively and insistently throughout ... At 33, Pelt is just starting to come into his own. Men of Honor is his most mature, satisfying release to date".

== Track listing ==
All compositions by Jeremy Pelt except where noted

1. "Backroad" (Dwayne Burno) – 6:46
2. "Milo Hayward" – 4:51
3. "Brooklyn Bound" (J. D. Allen) – 5:40
4. "Danny Mack" – 6:56
5. "From a Life of the Same Name" (Gerald Cleaver) – 7:15
6. "Illusion" – 5:04
7. "Us/Them" – 5:19
8. "Without You" (Danny Grissett) – 4:02

== Personnel ==
- Jeremy Pelt – trumpet, flugelhorn
- J. D. Allen – tenor saxophone
- Danny Grissett – piano
- Dwayne Burno – bass
- Gerald Cleaver – drums
