= Talkin' About You =

Studio album by Nat Adderley Quintet
- Released: 1991
- Recorded: November 8–9, 1990
- Studio: BMG Recording Studios, NYC
- Genre: Jazz
- Length: 57:16
- Label: Landmark; LCD-1528
- Producer: Orrin Keepnews and Nat Adderley

Nat Adderley chronology
Work Song: Live at Sweet Basil (1990)	Talkin' About You (1991)	The Old Country (1990)

Talkin' About You is an album by Nat Adderley's Quintet, recorded in 1990 and released on the Landmark label.

== Reception ==
Professional ratings
Review scores
Source	Rating
AllMusic	3/5 stars
The Penguin Guide to Jazz	2.5/4 stars

The Penguin Guide to Jazz states, "Astonishingly slow to get going (almost as if it were an unedited take of a live set) and marred by intonation problems with both horns, Talkin' About You develops into a storming session ... The rhythm section is faultless and the digital recording is of the highest quality". In his review for AllMusic, Richard S. Ginell stated, "Nat is not the crisp, confident cornetist of old ... Altoist Vincent Herring has a more forceful presence on the front line, his raw, hard tone and rhythmic sense not resembling Cannonball's in the least, while Rob Bargad offers competent mainstream piano ... The veterans in the rhythm section are just fine – no frills, nothing fancy, qualities that defined Nat's music at the time". On All About Jazz Douglas Payne noted, "No surprises occur, but it's one solid set that benefits from Nat's sterling work on cornet and highlights alto player Vincent Herring's frighteningly cloned Cannonball sound ... One can only hope the availability of Talkin' About You will encourage listeners to think twice about Nat Adderley's talents. He's left his own legacy and this set sums it up rather nicely."

== Track listing ==
1. "Talkin' About You, Cannon" (Nat Adderley) – 8:52
2. "I Can't Give You Anything But Love" (Jimmy McHugh, Dorothy Fields) – 7:03
3. "Arriving Soon" (Eddie Vinson) – 7:19
4. "Plum Street" (Adderley) – 5:55
5. "Azule Serape" (Victor Feldman) – 9:21
6. "Ill Wind" (Harold Arlen, Ted Koehler) – 5:42
7. "Mo's Theme" (Rob Bargad) – 5:42
8. "Big "P"" (Jimmy Heath) – 7:22

== Personnel ==
- Nat Adderley – cornet
- Vincent Herring – alto saxophone
- Rob Bargad – piano
- Walter Booker – bass
- Jimmy Cobb – drums
