= Blue Autumn =

Live album by Nat Adderley
- Released: 1983
- Recorded: October 1982
- Venue: Keystone Korner, San Francisco, CA
- Genre: Jazz
- Length: 40:22
- Label: Theresa
- Producer: Nat Adderley

Nat Adderley chronology
On the Move (1983)	Blue Autumn (1983)	We Remember Cannon (1989)

Blue Autumn is a jazz album by the Nat Adderley quartet. The album was recorded live in October 1982 at the Keystone Korner in San Francisco and released in 1983 on cassette and 12 Aug. 1993 on CD. On this date, the quintet featured Nat Adderley on cornet, Sonny Fortune on alto saxophone, Larry Willis on piano, Walter Booker on upright bass, and Jimmy Cobb on drums.

== Reception ==
Professional ratings
Review scores
Source	Rating
AllMusic	2.5/5 stars
The Penguin Guide to Jazz	3.5/4 stars

The Penguin Guide to Jazz states, "At just 40 minutes, Blue Autumn gives slightly short measure, but there's plenty packed in". In his review for AllMusic, Ron Wynn stated, "This '83 live set at the Keystone Korner was certainly an uneven, sometimes curious event. ... There are some fine cuts with punchy, snappy melodies, taut solos, and nice rhythm section interaction ... overall, this proves a good but not essential Nat Adderley date". In the Chicago Tribune Jack Fuller wrote, "The best Adderley music has always come in front of a crowd, and this 1983 recording of brother Nat is no exception. Done in a San Francisco club, the performance is by turns lively and lovely".

== Track listing ==
1. "For Duke and Cannon" (Sonny Fortune)—7:03
2. "The Fifth Labor of Hercules" (Andrew Arthur "Tex" Allen, Jr.)—6:24
3. "Book's Bossa" (Cedar Walton, Walter Booker)—9:02
4. "Blue Autumn" (Willis)—8:30
5. "Tallahassee Kid" (Willis)—9:23

== Personnel ==
- Nat Adderley - cornet
- Sonny Fortune - alto saxophone
- Larry Willis - piano
- Walter Booker - bass
- Jimmy Cobb - drums
