= Secret Love (Vincent Herring album) =

1993 album by Vincent Herring

Studio album by Vincent Herring
- Released: 1993
- Recorded: 1992
- Studio: Sound on Sound, New York City
- Genre: Jazz
- Length: 55:13
- Label: MusicMasters
- Producer: Big Apple Productions

Vincent Herring chronology
Dawnbird (1993)	Secret Love (1993)	Folklore: Live at the Village Vanguard (1994)

Secret Love is an album by saxophonist Vincent Herring, which was recorded in 1992 and released the following year on the MusicMasters label.

== Reception ==
Professional ratings
Review scores
Source	Rating
AllMusic	4.5/5 stars
Los Angeles Times	4/4 stars

AllMusic reviewed the album, stating, "Altoist Vincent Herring's release is an impressive effort. Although he still sounds fairly close to Cannonball Adderley at times, Herring is continuing to develop as a fine modern bop stylist."

Leonard Feather of the Los Angeles Times noted "Herring’s alto sax and Renee Rosnes’ piano here have an innovative sound and style. With fine support from bassist Ira Coleman and drummer Billy Drummond, they cover Strayhorn’s “Chelsea Bridge,” Miles Davis’ “Solar” and a take-no-prisoners version of the title track. A slashing Kenny Barron blues, “And Then Again,” winds things up."

The Chicago Tribune said, "Alto saxophonist Vincent Herring's phrasing isn't unique. You hear Frank Morgan in it, even Charlie Parker. But that doesn't reduce the pleasure, because the sheer musicality overcomes all doubts. Herring has the touch, and everything he touches on this recording glows."

== Track listing ==
1. "Have You Met Miss Jones?" (Richard Rodgers, Lorenz Hart) – 4:45
2. "Skating in Central Park" (John Lewis) – 5:26
3. "Secret Love" (Sammy Fain, Paul Francis Webster) – 6:14
4. "If You Never" (Antônio Carlos Jobim) – 5:32
5. "Autumn Leaves" (Joseph Kosma) – 8:51
6. "My Foolish Heart" (Victor Young) – 4:45
7. "Solar" (Chuck Wayne) – 7:17
8. "Chelsea Bridge" (Billy Strayhorn) – 4:30
9. "And Then Again" (Kenny Barron) – 7:53

== Personnel ==
- Vincent Herring – alto saxophone
- Renee Rosnes – piano
- Ira Coleman – bass
- Billy Drummond – drums
