= All Too Real =

Studio album by Vincent Herring
- Released: March 11, 2003
- Recorded: December 19, 2002
- Studio: Tedesco Studios, Paramus, NJ
- Genre: Jazz
- Length: 48:20
- Label: HighNote; HCD 7106
- Producer: Vincent Herring

Vincent Herring chronology
Simple Pleasure (2001)	All Too Real (2003)	Mr. Wizard (2004)

All Too Real is an album by saxophonist Vincent Herring which was recorded in 2002 and released on the HighNote label the following year.

== Reception ==
Professional ratings
Review scores
Source	Rating
Allmusic	4/5 stars
The Penguin Guide to Jazz Recordings	3/4 stars

Allmusic reviewed the album stating "Herring has developed his own personal voice on alto and has developed into a strong soprano sax player, too. This straight-ahead hard bop set finds Herring in top form ... The seven instrumentals feature Herring at the peak of his creative powers, making this one of his strongest recordings to date". JazzTimes observed "Herring’s latest album, All Too Real (HighNote), once again demonstrates his firm command of the hard-bop language. ... Herring offers a stimulating program that includes some hard-bop-style up-tunes, a gentle waltz and an uptempo Latin number".

== Track listing ==
All compositions by Vincent Herring except where noted

1. "Yoko's Delight" (Anthony Wonsey) – 6:38
2. "Athlolete" (Tex Allen) – 6:00
3. "Invitation" (Bronisław Kaper, Paul Francis Webster) – 5:54
4. "The Rain" – 6:26
5. "The Herring Pelt Clause" – 4:04
6. "Piece Part 2" – 5:14
7. "Love for Sale" (Cole Porter) – 8:20
8. "I'll Sing You a Lullaby" – 5:44

== Personnel ==
- Vincent Herring – alto saxophone, soprano saxophone
- Jeremy Pelt – trumpet (tracks 1, 2 & 5)
- Anthony Wonsey – piano
- Richie Goods – bass
- E.J. Strickland – drums
- Jill Seiffers – vocals (track 8)

=== Production ===
- Vincent Herring – producer
- David Baker – engineer
