= Simple Pleasure (Vincent Herring album) =

Studio album by Vincent Herring
- Released: October 16, 2001
- Recorded: March 21, 2001
- Studio: Van Gelder Studio, Englewood Cliffs, NJ
- Genre: Jazz
- Length: 59:47
- Label: HighNote; HCD 7084
- Producer: Don Sickler

Vincent Herring chronology
Jobim for Lovers (1999)	Simple Pleasure (2001)	All Too Real (2003)

Simple Pleasure is an album by saxophonist Vincent Herring which was recorded in 2001 and released on the HighNote label.

== Reception ==
Professional ratings
Review scores
Source	Rating
Allmusic	4.5/5 stars
The Penguin Guide to Jazz Recordings	3.5/4 stars

Allmusic reviewed the album stating "Altoist Vincent Herring is in top form throughout the driving bebop/hard bop date Simple Pleasure ... Herring has rarely sounded more fiery and inspired. This is one of his finest recordings to date". JazzTimes observed "Vincent Herring’s aptly named Simple Pleasures offers the listener just that. Neither groundbreaking nor overly challenging in its repertory or its execution, this up-dated hard-bop session offers the satisfaction of highly competent performers playing straightforward material at the top of their form". All About Jazz noted "This record shows with clarity the depth and maturity of these players. These are very self-assured, convincing and yet graceful jazz musicians and who moreover, work together in uncommon synergy ... This is still Herring's record though, and he plays the horn up and down, showing a more aggressive side".

== Track listing ==
All compositions by Vincent Herring except where noted

1. "The Loop" – 6:05
2. "Once in a Lifetime" – 8:07
3. "Simple Pleasure" (Cedar Walton) – 5:59
4. "Sophia Marie" – 5:29
5. "Rounder's Mood" (Booker Little) – 6:04
6. "Sophisticated Lady" (Duke Ellington, Mitchell Parish, Irving Mills) – 5:35
7. "Straight Street" (John Coltrane) – 6:10
8. "Holly's Secret" – 7:43
9. "There Is No Greater Love" (Isham Jones, Marty Symes) – 8:35

== Personnel ==
- Vincent Herring – alto saxophone, soprano saxophone
- Wallace Roney – trumpet (tracks 4, 5, 8 & 9)
- Mulgrew Miller – piano
- Richie Goods – bass
- E.J. Strickland – drums

=== Production ===
- Don Sickler – producer
- Rudy Van Gelder – engineer
