= Hummin' =

Studio album by Nat Adderley
- Released: 1976
- Recorded: 1976
- Studio: Generation Sound Studios
- Genre: Jazz
- Length: 42:16
- Label: Little David; LD1012
- Producer: Nat Adderley

Nat Adderley chronology
| Don't Look Back (1976) | Hummin' (1976) | A Little New York Midtown Music (1978) |

Hummin' is an album by jazz cornetist Nat Adderley recorded in 1976 and released on the Dutch Little David label.

== Reception ==
Professional ratings
Review scores
| Source | Rating |
|---|---|
| Allmusic | 3/5 stars |

The Allmusic review by Scott Yanow stated "somewhat dated and often a bit commercial; not one of Nat Adderley's more significant releases."

== Track listing ==
1. "Hummin'" (Nat Adderley) – 5:22
2. "Midnight Over Memphis" (John Stubblefield) – 5:06
3. "The Traveler" (Cannonball Adderley, Nat Adderley, Diane Lampert) – 3:55
4. "Theme from M*A*S*H (Suicide Is Painless)" (Michael Altman, Johnny Mandel) – 6:10
5. "Listen to the Rain" (Onaje Allan Gumbs) – 6:55
6. "Amor Soñador" (Stubblefield) – 7:00
7. "Valerie" (Nat Adderley) – 7:56

== Personnel ==
- Nat Adderley – cornet
- John Stubblefield – tenor saxophone, soprano saxophone
- Onaje Allan Gumbs – piano
- Fernando Gumbs – bass
- Ira Buddy Williams – drums
- Victor See Yuen – congas, percussion
