= Voices Deep Within =

Studio album by Cedar Walton
- Released: September 22, 2009
- Recorded: May 20, 2009; Van Gelder Studio, Englewood Cliffs, NJ
- Genre: Jazz
- Length: 56:36
- Label: HighNote; HCD 7204
- Producer: Don Sickler

Cedar Walton chronology
Seasoned Wood (2008)	Voices Deep Within (2009)	Song of Delilah: The Music of Victor Young (2010)

Voices Deep Within is an album by pianist Cedar Walton which was recorded in 2009 and released on the Highnote label.

== Reception ==
Allmusic reviewed the album stating "Walton always has something beautiful to play that sets him apart from the rest, and is as good as a ton of bullion in his golden, productive years". All About Jazz observed "Since 2001, Cedar Walton's regular excursions into Rudy Van Gelder's legendary Englewood Cliffs studio for the HighNote label have consistently resulted in some of this century's finest mainstream jazz recordings. On Voices Deep Within he continues the tradition, once again demonstrating the vitality and endurance of (t)his music. ".

Professional ratings
Review scores
Source	Rating
Allmusic	3.5/5 stars

== Track listing ==
All compositions by Cedar Walton except as indicated

1. "Voices Deep Within" - 6:42
2. "Memories of You" (Eubie Blake, Andy Razaf) - 6:07
3. "Another Star" (Stevie Wonder) - 8:22
4. "Dear Ruth" - 6:16
5. "Something in Common" - 6:32
6. "Over the Rainbow" (Harold Arlen, Yip Harburg) - 7:03
7. "Naima" (John Coltrane) - 6:29
8. "No Moe" (Sonny Rollins) - 9:05

== Personnel ==
- Cedar Walton - piano
- Vincent Herring - tenor saxophone
- Buster Williams - bass
- Willie Jones III - drums

=== Production ===
- Don Sickler - producer
- Rudy Van Gelder - engineer
