= A Little New York Midtown Music =

Studio album by Nat Adderley
- Released: 1979
- Recorded: September 18–19, 1978
- Studio: Fantasy, Berkeley, CA
- Genre: Jazz
- Length: 48:23
- Label: Galaxy; GXY-5120
- Producer: Orrin Keepnews

Nat Adderley chronology
Hummin' (1976)	A Little New York Midtown Music (1979)	On the Move (1983)

A Little New York Midtown Music is an album by jazz cornetist Nat Adderley, recorded in 1978 and released on the Galaxy label.

== Reception ==
Professional ratings
Review scores
Source	Rating
AllMusic	3.5/5 stars
DownBeat	2.5/5 stars
The Penguin Guide to Jazz	3/4 stars

The Bay State Banner wrote that "Adderly's crisp season cornet solos and able melodic playing are soulful and enjoyable."

The AllMusic review by Scott Yanow noted, "The music is essentially modern hard bop and is as well-played as one would expect from this strong personnel". The Penguin Guide to Jazz criticized the recording quality, but praised the contributions of Adderley, Feldman, and Griffin.

== Track listing ==
All compositions by Nat Adderley except where noted.

1. "Fortune's Child" – 6:17
2. "A Little New York Midtown Music" – 7:42
3. "Sunshine Sammy" – 7:43
4. "Yeehaw Junction" – 5:42
5. "Come Rain or Come Shine" (Harold Arlen, Johnny Mercer) – 5:28
6. "Whipitup" (Victor Feldman) – 3:26
7. "Saguaro" (Ron Carter) – 7:19

== Personnel ==
- Nat Adderley – cornet
- Johnny Griffin – tenor saxophone
- Victor Feldman – piano, electric piano
- Ron Carter – bass
- Roy McCurdy – drums
