= John Stubblefield =

American jazz musician (1945–2005)

- Born: February 4, 1945; Little Rock, Arkansas, U.S.
- Died: July 4, 2005 (aged 60) The Bronx, New York, U.S.
- Genres: Jazz
- Instruments: Saxophone, flute, oboe

John Stubblefield (February 4, 1945 – July 4, 2005) was an American jazz saxophonist, flautist, and oboist.

== Early life ==
Stubblefield was born and raised in Little Rock, Arkansas. He studied music at the Association for the Advancement of Creative Musicians with Muhal Richard Abrams in Chicago before moving to New York City in 1971.

== Career ==
After moving to New York, Stubblefield played with the Mingus Big Band for 13 years. During his career, Stubblefield played with the World Saxophone Quartet (1986–1988), Reggie Workman (1989–1993), McCoy Tyner (1984), Freddie Hubbard (1985), and George Russell (1985). Stubblefield also served for a time as a jazz ensemble director at the Mason Gross School of the Arts, following the departure of Paul Jeffrey in 1983.

== Discography ==
=== As leader ===
- Prelude (Storyville, 1976) with Onaje Allan Gumbs, Cecil McBee, Joe Chambers, James Mtume, Cecil Bridgewater
- Midnight Over Memphis (Denon, 1979)
- Midnight Sun (Sutra, 1980)
- Confessin' (Soul Note, 1984) with Cecil Bridgewater, Mulgrew Miller, Rufus Reid, Eddie Gladden
- Bushman Song (Enja, 1986) with Geri Allen, Charnett Moffett, Mino Cinelu, Victor Lewis
- Countin’ on the Blues (Enja, 1987) with Hamiet Bluiett, Mulgrew Miller, Charnett Moffett, Victor Lewis
- Sophisticatedfunk (Cheetah, 1990)
- Morning Song (Enja, 1993) with George Cables, Victor Lewis, Clint Houston

=== As sideman ===
With Nat Adderley

- Don't Look Back (SteepleChase, 1976)
- Hummin' (Little David, 1976)

With Kenny Barron

- Golden Lotus (Muse, 1980 [1982])
- What If? (Enja, 1986)
- Live at Fat Tuesdays (Enja, 1988)
- Quickstep (Enja, 1991)
- Things Unseen (1997)

With Lester Bowie

- Fast Last! (Muse, 1974)

With Anthony Braxton

- Town Hall 1972 (Trio, 1972)

With Stanley Cowell

- Regeneration (Strata-East, 1976)

With Miles Davis

- Get Up with It (1974)

With Craig Harris

- F-Stops (Soul Note, 1993)

With Billy Hart

- Amethyst (Arabesque, 1993)
- Oceans of Time (Arabesque, 1997)

With Louis Hayes

- The Crawl (Candid, 1989)
- Una Max (SteepleChase, 1989)

With Julius Hemphill

- Julius Hemphill Big Band (Elektra/Musician, 1988)

With Franklin Kiermyer

- In The House Of My Fathers (Konnex, 1993)

With Abdullah Ibrahim

- African River (Enja, 1989)

With Joseph Jarman

- As If It Were the Seasons (1968)

With Victor Lewis

- Family Portrait (AudioQuest Music, 1992)

With Maurice McIntyre

- Humility in the Light of the Creator (Delmark, 1969)

With Sam Rivers

- Crystals (Impulse!, 1974)

With McCoy Tyner

- Sama Layuca (Milestone, 1974)
- The Turning Point (Birdology, 1991)
- Journey (Birdology, 1993)

With Larry Willis

- A Tribute to Someone (AudioQuest, 1994)

With Paul (PB) Brown

- Paul Brown Quartet Meets The Three Tenors (1998)
