= The Talented Mr. Pelt =

Studio album by Jeremy Pelt
- Released: January 25, 2011
- Recorded: September 15, 2010
- Studio: Van Gelder Studio, Englewood Cliffs, NJ
- Genre: Jazz
- Length: 52:29
- Label: HighNote; HCD 7216
- Producer: Jeremy Pelt

Jeremy Pelt chronology
Men of Honor (2010)	The Talented Mr. Pelt (2011)	Soul (2011)

The Talented Mr. Pelt is an album by trumpeter Jeremy Pelt which was recorded in 2010 and released on the HighNote label the following year.

== Reception ==
Professional ratings
Review scores
Source	Rating
Allmusic	4/5 stars
Jazzwise	5/5 stars

In his review on Allmusic, Matt Collar states "A forward-thinking improviser with an ear for late-'60s Miles Davis and '70s Woody Shaw, Pelt pushes the brass envelope as much as possible and can engage a listener quite well on record. In that sense, you never get a canned or predictable moment on The Talented Mr. Pelt ... Of all of Pelt's prodigious talents showcased on The Talented Mr. Pelt, clearly the ability to pick musically sympathetic and daring sidemen makes the album a joy to hear". In Jazzwise, James McCarthy noted "If history is kind and just, it will remember this Jeremy Pelt Quintet and its collective members as one of the most important and creative bands to emerge in jazz since Miles’ mid-1960s group. A great recording by a band that is THAT good!". In JazzTimes, Ron Wynn said: "in little more than a decade after his arrival in New York he’s generated considerable excitement. His group’s latest recording comprehensively demonstrates why he’s so well regarded. Pelt is a technical marvel. He executes intricate solos with ease, plays gorgeous ballads in a tasteful manner, and never lacks flair or sensitivity. At the same time, The Talented Mr. Pelt is a group statement rather than an individual showcase. Pelt deliberately doesn’t dominate the spotlight, and the band achieves a blend of spontaneity and precision that makes these songs a pleasure to hear".

== Track listing ==
All compositions by Jeremy Pelt except where noted

1. "Pandora's Box" – 4:27
2. "All My Thoughts Are of You" – 6:34
3. "Paradise Lost" (Anthony Wonsey) – 7:19
4. "When the Time Is Right" – 5:36
5. "Pulse" – 9:06
6. "In Love Again" (Cy Coleman, Peggy Lee) – 5:57
7. "Only" – 5:36
8. "David and Goliath" – 7:54

== Personnel ==
- Jeremy Pelt – trumpet, flugelhorn
- J. D. Allen – tenor saxophone
- Danny Grissett – piano
- Dwayne Burno – bass
- Gerald Cleaver – drums
