= Confessin' (album) =

Studio album by John Stubblefield
- Released: 1984
- Recorded: September 18 & 21, 1984
- Genre: Jazz
- Length: 41:34
- Label: Soul Note
- Producer: Giovanni Bonandrini

John Stubblefield chronology
Prelude (1976)	Confessin' (1984)	Bushman Song (1986)

Confessin' is an album by the American jazz saxophonist John Stubblefield recorded in 1984 and released on the Italian Soul Note label.

== Reception ==
The Allmusic review by Ken Dryden awarded the album 4 stars stating "John Stubblefield has made relatively few recordings as a leader during his long career, but it isn't because the saxophonist isn't deserving... This top-notch CD is well worth acquiring".

Professional ratings
Review scores
Source	Rating
Allmusic	4/5 stars

== Track listing ==
All compositions by John Stubblefield except as indicated

1. "Spiral Dance" – 5:08
2. "Waltz for Duke Pearson" (Cecil Bridgewater) – 4:47
3. "Blood Count" (Billy Strayhorn) – 6:33
4. "More Fun" – 4:10
5. "Dusk to Dawn" – 7:48
6. "Whisper" (Mulgrew Miller) – 4:06
7. "Confessin'" – 9:02
  - Recorded at the Vanguard Studios in New York City on September 18 & 21, 1984

== Personnel ==
- John Stubblefield – tenor saxophone, soprano saxophone
- Cecil Bridgewater – trumpet, flugelhorn
- Mulgrew Miller – piano
- Rufus Reid – bass
- Eddie Gladden – drums
