= Buddy Williams (jazz drummer) =

American musician (born 1952)

- Born: Ira "Buddy" Williams
- Occupations: Session musician; jazz drummer
- Years active: 1976-present
- Musical career
- Origin: New York City
- Instruments: Drums

Ira "Buddy" Williams (born December 17, 1952, in New York City) is an American jazz drummer. He has played with Grover Washington, Cedar Walton, David Sanborn, Kirk Whalum, Joe Sample, The Manhattan Transfer, Nat Adderley, Roberta Flack, McCoy Tyner and others. Willams is a past member of the Saturday Night Live Band, and has performed drums and percussion for theatrical works including Hello, Dolly!, Motown: The Musical, The Color Purple, among others.

In 2024, Williams received the New York City Musicians Collective Honors award.

== Early life and education ==
Buddy Willams started playing professionally at eight years old. He attended High School of Music and Art during which time he played with the group "Natural Essence". Williams graduated from Manhattan School of Music.

== Career ==
In Leonard Feather’s 1976 review of Nat Adderley’s Adderley Quintet debut performance in Los Angeles, he described "an explosive drummer named Buddy Williams."

During the early 1980s, he toured with Corea and Return to Forever, then worked with Bobby Lyle, Eliane Elias, David Benoit, Michel Petrucciani and McCoy Tyner, playing on his "Looking Out" album.

In 1981, Williams co-wrote "Rollin' On" and "Ballad for D." with Roberta Flack for the Bustin' Loose soundtrack.

== Discography ==
=== As sideman ===
With Nat Adderley

- Don't Look Back (SteepleChase, 1976)
- Hummin' (Little David, 1976)

With Andy Bey

- Experience and Judgment (Atlantic, 1974)

With Carla Bley

- Fleur Carnivore (Watt, 1989)

With Doug Carn

- Revelation (Black Jazz, 1973)

With George Freeman

- Man & Woman (Groove Merchant, 1974)

With Dizzy Gillespie

- Closer to the Source (Atlantic, 1984)

With Dave Grusin

- Dave Grusin & The GRP All-Stars - Live in Japan (Arista Records, 1981)

With Roberta Flack

- Rollin' On (MCA, 1981)
- Ballad for D. (MCA, 1981)

With Jaroslav Jakubovic

- Checkin' In (Columbia, 1978)

With Howard Johnson and Gravity

- Testimony (Tuscarora, 2017)

With Hugh Masekela

- Main Event Live (A&M, 1978)

With Lee Ritenour

- Rio (1979)

With David Sanborn

- Straight to the Heart (Warner Bros. Records, 1984)

With Sonny Sharrock & Linda Sharrock

- Paradise (ATCO Records, 1975)

With Valerie Simpson

- Valerie Simpson (Tamla, 1972)

With Lonnie Liston Smith

- Dreams of Tomorrow (Doctor Jazz, 1983)

With Bob Stewart

- Goin' Home (JMT, 1989)

With McCoy Tyner

- Looking Out (Columbia, 1982)

With Luther Vandross

- Never Too Much (Epic, 1981)

With Cedar Walton

- Animation (Columbia, 1978)
- Soundscapes (Columbia, 1980)
