= David Hazeltine =

American jazz pianist, composer, and educator

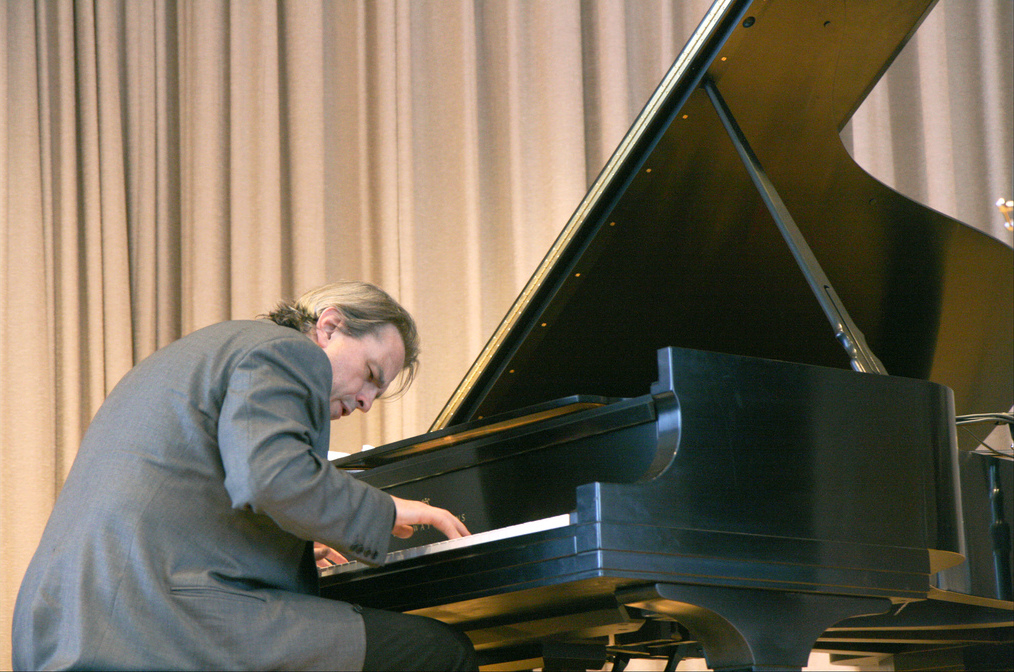

Background information
- Born: October 27, 1958 (age 67); Milwaukee, Wisconsin, U.S.
- Genres: Jazz
- Occupations: Musician, composer, arranger, educator
- Instrument: Piano
- Years active: 1990s–present
- Labels: Sharp Nine, Chesky, Criss Cross, Venus, Smoke Sessions
- Website: www.davidhazeltine.com

David Perry Hazeltine (born October 27, 1958) is an American jazz pianist, composer, arranger, and educator.

== Early life ==
Hazeltine was born in Milwaukee, Wisconsin, on October 27, 1958. He began studying the piano at the age of nine, and first performed professionally when he was thirteen. He attended the Wisconsin College Conservatory of Music from 1976 to 1979.

== Later life and career ==
=== 1980–1992 ===
Hazeltine worked around Chicago, Minneapolis, and Milwaukee, and was the regular pianist for the Milwaukee Jazz Gallery. He obtained a BA from the University of Wisconsin in 1991. After performing with Chet Baker at the Milwaukee Jazz Gallery, the trumpeter suggested he should move to New York City, which he did in 1981. After two years, "domestic considerations prompted a return to his home town". He returned to the Wisconsin College Conservatory of Music, and was the chairman of the jazz department from 1985 to 1992. In 1992, he returned to New York.

=== 1993–present ===
In New York, Hazeltine led a trio that included Peter Washington on bass and Louis Hayes on drums. He also worked with the Carnegie Hall Jazz Band, Slide Hampton's big band, and the group One for All. His first solo album, Four Flights Up, appeared in 1995.

He has spent time composing, but has stated that he does not find it easy. Although he is a pianist, he feels influenced more by saxophonists, particularly Charlie Parker.

== Discography ==
=== As leader/co-leader ===
Recording date	Title	Label	Year released	Personnel/Notes
1995–07	4 Flights Up	Sharp Nine	1995	Quartet, with Slide Hampton (trombone), Peter Washington (bass), Ray Appleton (drums)
1996–08	The Classic Trio	Sharp Nine	1996	Trio, with Peter Washington (bass), Louis Hayes (drums)
1997–10	How It Is	Criss Cross	1998	With Jim Rotondi (trumpet, flugelhorn), Steve Wilson (alto sax), Peter Washington (bass), Joe Farnsworth (drums)
1998–12	Blues Quarters, Vol. 1	Criss Cross	2000	Quartet, with Eric Alexander (tenor sax), Dwayne Burno (bass), Joe Farnsworth (drums)
1998–05, 1998–12	A World for Her	Criss Cross	1999	With Javon Jackson (tenor sax), Steve Nelson (vibes), Peter Washington (bass), Louis Hayes and Joe Farnsworth (drums; separately)
1998–12	Waltz for Debby	Venus	1999	Trio, with George Mraz (bass), Billy Drummond (drums)
1999–09	Mutual Admiration Society	Sharp Nine	1999	Co-led quartet with Joe Locke (vibes). Also with Essiet Essiet (bass), Billy Drummond (drums).
2000–01	The Classic Trio, Vol. 2	Sharp Nine	2000	Trio, with Peter Washington (bass), Louis Hayes (drums)
2000–02	Senor Blues	Venus	2000	Trio, with Peter Washington (bass), Louis Hayes (drums)
2000–11	Pearls	Venus	2001	Trio, with Peter Washington (bass), Joe Farnsworth (drums)
2001–01	Good-Hearted People	Criss Cross	2001	With Steve Davis (trombone), Jim Snidero (alto sax, flute), Jesse van Ruller (guitar), Nat Reeves (bass), Tony Reedus (drums)
2001–09	The Classic Trio Meets Eric Alexander	Sharp Nine	2002	Quartet, with Eric Alexander (tenor sax), Peter Washington (bass), Louis Hayes (drums)
2002–11	Manhattan Autumn	Sharp Nine	2003	Quartet, with Eric Alexander (tenor sax), Peter Washington (bass), Joe Farnsworth (drums)
2003–07	Alice in Wonderland	Venus	2004	Trio, with George Mraz (bass), Billy Drummond (drums)
2003–11	Close to You	Criss Cross	2004	Trio, with Peter Washington (bass), Joe Farnsworth (drums)
2004–12	Modern Standards	Sharp Nine	2005	Trio, with David Williams (bass), Joe Farnsworth (drums)
2005–06	Cleopatra's Dream	Venus	2006	Trio, with George Mraz (bass), Billy Drummond (drums)
2005–05	Perambulation	Criss Cross	2006	Trio, with Peter Washington (bass), Joe Farnsworth (drums)
2005–12	Manhattan	Chesky	2006	Trio, with George Mraz (bass), Billy Drummond (drums)
2006–03	Blues Quarters, Vol. 2	Criss Cross	2007	With Eric Alexander (tenor sax), Dwayne Burno (bass), Joe Farnsworth (drums), percussion
2006–03	Alfie	Venus	2006	Trio, with David Williams (bass), Joe Farnsworth (drums)
2006–11	The Jobim Songbook in New York	Chesky	2007	Trio, with Nat Reeves (bass), Joe Farnsworth (drums)
2007–04	The Inspiration Suite	Sharp Nine	2007	With Eric Alexander (tenor sax), Joe Locke (vibes), John Webber (bass), Joe Farnsworth (drums)
2009–02	Mutual Admiration Society 2	Sharp Nine	2009	Co-led quartet with Joe Locke (vibes). Also with Essiet Essiet (bass), Billy Drummond (drums)
2010–02	Inversions	Criss Cross	2010	Quintet, with Eric Alexander (tenor sax), Steve Nelson (vibes), John Webber (bass), Joe Farnsworth (drums)
2012–03	The New Classic Trio	Sharp Nine	2012	Trio, with George Mraz (bass), Joe Farnsworth (drums)
2012–11	Your Story	Cube Metier	2013	Trio, with George Mraz (bass), Jason Brown (drums)
2012–11	Impromptu	Chesky	2013	Trio, with George Mraz (bass), Jason Brown (drums)
2013–12	I Remember Cedar	Sharp Nine	2014	Trio, with David Williams (bass), Joe Farnsworth (drums)
2014–04	For All We Know	Smoke Sessions	2014	Quartet, with Seamus Blake (tenor sax), David Williams (bass), Joe Farnsworth (drums)
2016?	Next Door	Megabien Music	2016	with Billy Peterson (bass)
2018–05	The Time Is Now	Smoke Sessions	2018	Trio, with Ron Carter (bass), Al Foster (drums)
2022–12	Blues For Gerry	Criss Cross	2023	Trio, with Peter Washington (bass), Joe Farnsworth (drums)

=== As sideman ===
- Eric Alexander, Temple of Olympic Zeus (HighNote, 2007)
- Javon Jackson, Sugar Hill: The Music of Duke Ellington and Billy Strayhorn (Chesky, 2007)
- Jesse van Ruller, Here and There (Criss Cross, 2002)
- Cory Weeds Quintet, It's Easy to Remember (Cellar Live, 2016)
