= Jeremy Pelt =

American jazz trumpeter (born 1976)

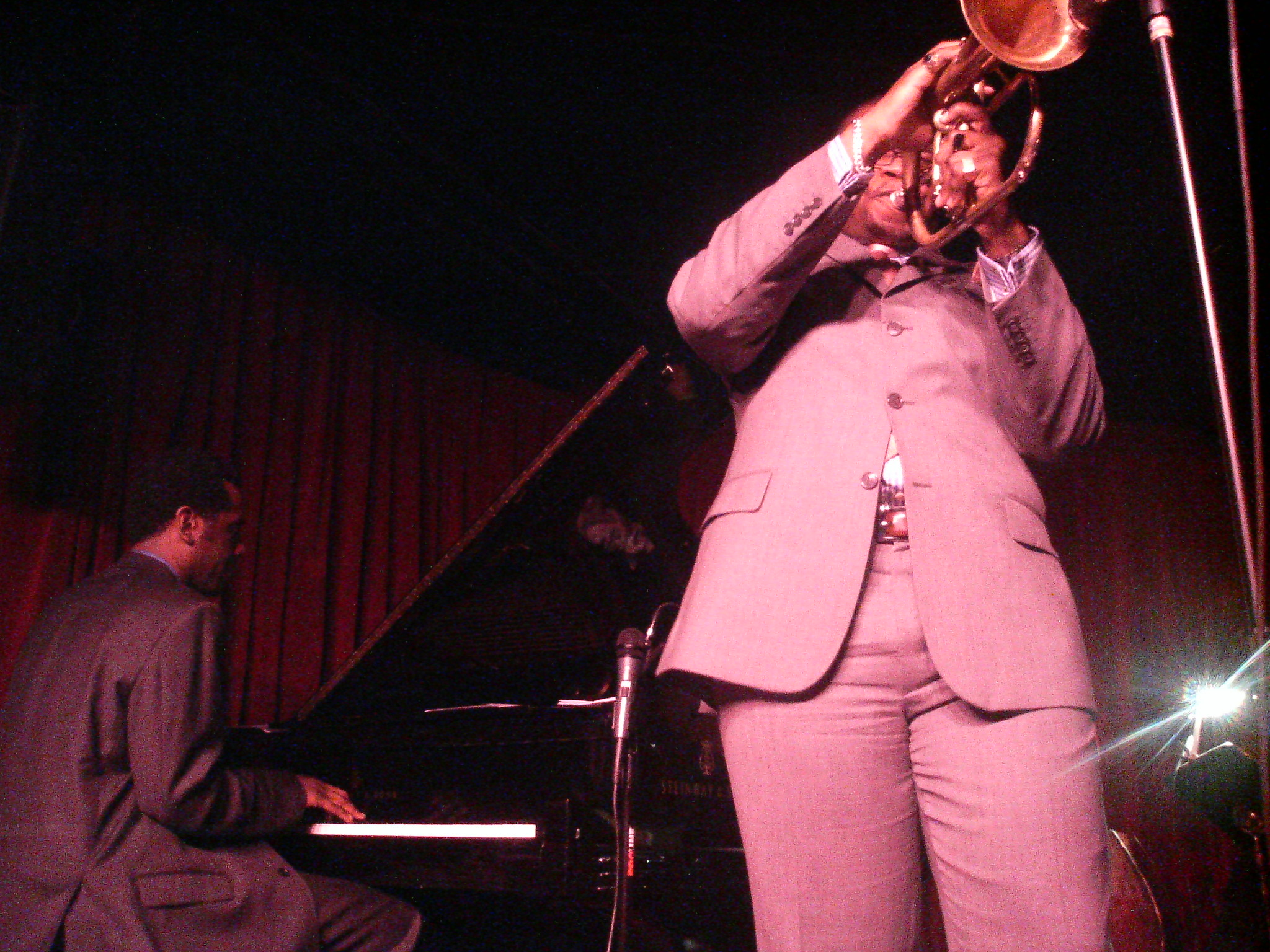

Background information
- Born: November 4, 1976 (age 49); Los Angeles, California, U.S.
- Genres: Jazz
- Occupation: Musician
- Instrument: Trumpet
- Years active: 2000–present
- Labels: Maxjazz; HighNote
- Website: jeremypelt.net

Jeremy Pelt (born November 4, 1976, in California) is an American jazz trumpeter.

== Career ==
Pelt studied classical trumpet as a child and focused on jazz after playing in a high school jazz ensemble. He studied at Berklee College of Music. Among those he has performed with are Ravi Coltrane, Roy Hargrove, Greg Osby, and Cassandra Wilson.

== Discography ==
=== As leader ===
- Profile (Fresh Sound, 2002)
- Insight (Criss Cross, 2003)
- Close to My Heart (Maxjazz, 2003)
- Identity (Maxjazz, 2005)
- Shock Value: Live at Smoke (Maxjazz, 2007)
- November (Maxjazz, 2008)
- Men of Honor (HighNote, 2010)
- The Talented Mr. Pelt (HighNote, 2011)
- Soul (HighNote, 2012)
- Water and Earth (HighNote, 2013)
- Face Forward, Jeremy (HighNote, 2014)
- Tales, Musings and Other Reveries (HighNote, 2015)
- #Jiveculture (HighNote, 2016)
- High Art (HighNote, 2016)
- The Co-Op (Brown Brothers Recordings, 2017)
- Make Noise! (HighNote, 2017)
- Noir En Rouge: Live in Paris (HighNote, 2018)
- Jubilation! Celebrating Cannonball Adderley (Savant, 2018) - with Jim Snidero
- The Artist (HighNote, 2019)
- The Art of Intimacy, Vol. 1 (HighNote, 2020)
- Griot: This is Important! (HighNote, 2021)
- Soundtrack (HighNote, 2022)
- The Art of Intimacy, Vol. 2: His Muse (HighNote, 2023)
- Tomorrow is Another Day (HighNote, 2024)
- Woven (HighNote, 2025)
- Our Community Will Not Be Erased (HighNote, 2026)

=== As sideman ===
With David Chesky

- Jazz in the New Harmonic (Chesky, 2013)
- Primal Scream (Chesky, 2015)

With Gerald Cleaver

- Gerald Cleaver's Detroit (Fresh Sound, 2007)
- Live at Firehouse 12 (Sunnyside, 2019)

With Wayne Escoffery

- Intuition (Nagel Heyer, 2004)
- Vortex (Sunnyside, 2018)

With Louis Hayes

- Maximum Firepower (Savant, 2006)
- Live at Cory Weed's Cellar Jazz Club (Cellar Live, 2014)

With Vincent Herring

- Change the World (MusicMasters/BMG, 1997)
- All Too Real (HighNote, 2003)
- Mr. Wizard (HighNote, 2004)
- Ends and Means (HighNote, 2005)
- Night and Day (Smoke Sessions, 2015)

With Mike LeDonne

- FiveLive (Savant, 2008)
- AwwlRIGHT! (Savant, 2015)

With Rene Marie

- Vertigo (Maxjazz, 2001)
- Serene Renegade (Maxjazz, 2004)

With Mingus Big Band

- Tonight at Noon...Three or Four Shades of Love (Dreyfus, 2002)
- I Am Three (Sunnyside, 2005)

With Ralph Peterson Jr.

- The Art of War (Criss Cross, 2001)
- Subliminal Seduction (Criss Cross, 2002)
- Tests of Time (Criss Cross, 2003)

With Lonnie Plaxico

- Melange (Blue Note, 2001)
- Rhythm & Soul (Sirocco Music, 2003)
- Live at the Zinc Bar (Plaxmusic, 2007)

With Jim Snidero

- Jubilation! (Savant, 2018)
- Waves of Calm (Savant, 2019)

With Soulive

- Doin' Something (Blue Note, 2001)
- Steady Groovin (Blue Note, 2005) – compilation

With Gerald Wilson

- In My Time (Mack Avenue, 2005)
- Legacy (Mack Avenue, 2011)

With others

- Eric Alexander, Chicago Fire (HighNote, 2014)
- J. D. Allen, Pharoah's Children (Criss Cross, 2001)
- Ben Allison, Layers of the City (Sonic Camera, 2017)
- Roni Ben-Hur, Keepin' It Open (Motema, 2007)
- Roxy Coss, Restless Idealism (Origin, 2016)
- Dena DeRose, We Won't Forget You (HighNote, 2014)
- David Finck, Future Day (Soundbrush, 2007)
- Al Foster, Inspirations & Dedications (Smoke Sessions, 2019)
- Frank Foster, We Do It Diff'rent (Mapleshade, 2002)
- Jared Gold, Reemergence (Strikezone 2018)
- Noah Haidu, Infinite Distances (Cellar Live, 2017)
- Kathy Kosins, Vintage (Mahogany, 2005)
- Harold Mabern, Afro Blue (Smoke Sessions, 2015)
- Lewis Nash, The Highest Mountain (Cellar Live, 2012)
- John L. Nelson, Don't Play with Love (Maken It Music, 2018)
- Jaleel Shaw, Optimism (Changu, 2008)
- Connie Han (Iron Starlet, 2020
- Wayne Shorter, Alegria (Verve, 2003)
- Jarek Smietana & Gary Bartz, African Lake (Starling, 2000)
- Somi, Red Soil in My Eyes (World Village, 2007)
- Baptiste Trotignon, Suite (Naive, 2009)
- Camille Thurman, Waiting for the Sunrise (Chesky, 2018)
- Cedar Walton, Seasoned Wood (HighNote, 2008)
- World Saxophone Quartet, Political Blues (Justin Time, 2006)
