= Steve Davis (trombonist) =

American jazz trombonist

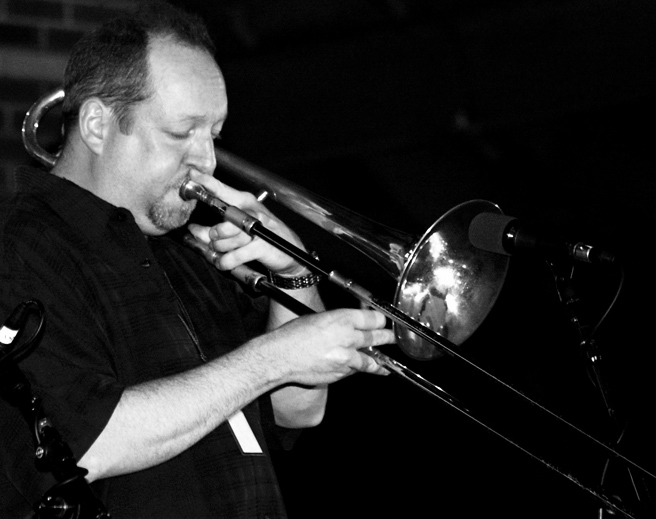
- Davis at the Hartford Jazz Festival, 2007

Background information
- Born: April 14, 1967 (age 59); Worcester, Massachusetts, U.S.
- Genre: Jazz
- Occupation: Musician
- Instrument: Trombone
- Years active: 1980s–present
- Labels: Brownstone; Criss Cross; Mapleshade; Posi-Tone; Smoke Sessions
- Website: stevedavismusic.com

Steve Davis (born April 14, 1967) is an American jazz trombonist.

== Early life and education ==
Born in Worcester, Massachusetts, Davis was raised in Binghamton, New York. He grew up with jazz music being played in his household. He studied jazz under Jackie McLean at the University of Hartford Hartt School.

== Career ==
McLean recommended Davis to Art Blakey, and he joined The Jazz Messengers in 1989. After Blakey's death, Davis joined the Hartt faculty in the early 1990s.

Davis played in Chick Corea's Origin, and recorded with them in the late 1990s and early 2000s. Davis has been a member of the sextet One for All since its inception around 1996. Along with Davis, the band features Eric Alexander, Jim Rotondi, David Hazeltine, John Webber and Joe Farnsworth. Davis led his own bands in New York City in the mid-2000s.

== Discography ==
=== As leader ===
- The Moon Knows (Brownstone, 1994)
- The Jaunt (Criss Cross, 1995)
- Dig Deep (Criss Cross, 1996)
- New Terrain w/ Explorers Quintet (Indie release, 1997)
- Crossfire (Criss Cross, 1997)
- Vibe Up (Criss Cross, 1998)
- Portrait in Sound (Stretch, 2000)
- Systems Blue (Criss Cross, 2001)
- Meant to Be (Criss Cross, 2003)
- Alone Together (Mapleshade, 2004)
- Update (Criss Cross, 2006)
- Outlook (Posi-Tone, 2008)
- Meets Hank Jones, Vol. 1 (Smoke Sessions, 2008)
- Images: The Hartford Suite (Posi-Tone, 2009)
- Live at Small's (Smalls Live, 2009)
- Gettin' It Done (Posi-Tone, 2012)
- For Real (Posi-Tone, 2014)
- Say When (Smoke Sessions, 2015)
- Think Ahead (Smoke Sessions, 2017)
- Correlations (Smoke Sessions, 2019)
- Bluesthetic (Smoke Sessions, 2022)
- We See (Smoke Sessions, 2024)

=== As a member ===
Dizzy Gillespie Alumni All-Star Big Band

- Dizzy's Business (MCG Jazz, 2006) – rec. 2005
- I'm BeBoppin' Too (Half Note, 2008)

Christian McBride Big Band

- Bringin' It (Mack Avenue, 2017)

=== As sideman ===
With Art Blakey

- Chippin' In (Timeless, 1990)
- One for All (A&M, 1990)

With Conrad Herwig

- Osteology (Criss Cross Jazz,1998)
- A Jones For Bones Tones (Criss Cross Jazz, 2007)

With Harold Mabern

- Mabern Plays Mabern (Smoke Sessions, 2018)
- Mabern Plays Coltrane (Smoke Sessions, 2018)

With Jackie McLean

- Rhythm of the Earth (Birdology, 1992)
- Fire & Love (Toshiba EMI/Blue Note, 1997)

With others

- Eric Alexander, Mode for Mabes (Delmark, 1998)
- Joe Farnsworth, Beautiful Friendship (Criss Cross Jazz, 1998)
- Avishai Cohen, Adama (Stretch/Concord, 1998)
- Cecil Payne, Payne's Window (Delmark, 1999)
- Chick Corea & Origin, Change (Stretch/Concord, 1999)
- Jimmy Greene, Brand New world (BMG, 1999)
- David Hazeltine, Good-Hearted People (Criss Cross Jazz, 2001)
- Steve Turre, One 4-J (Telarc International, 2002)
- Slide Hampton's World of Trombones, Spirit of the Horn (MCG Jazz, 2002)
- Michael Weiss, Soul Journey (Sintra, 2003)
- Andy Bey, American Song (Savoy, 2004)
- Jimmy Heath Big Band, Turn Up the Heath (Planet Arts, 2006)
- Larry Willis, Blue Fable (HighNote, 2007)
- Freddie Hubbard & New Jazz On the Real Side Composers Octet (Hip Bop, 2008)
- Benny Golson, New Time, New 'Tet (Concord Jazz, 2008)
- One for All. Return of the Lineup (Sharp Nine, 2009)
- Jay Ashby, Mistaken Identity (MCG Jazz, 2011)
- Natalie Merchant, Keep Your Courage (Nonesuch, 2023)
