= Benny Sharoni =

Israeli-American saxophonist

Benny Sharoni בני שרוני
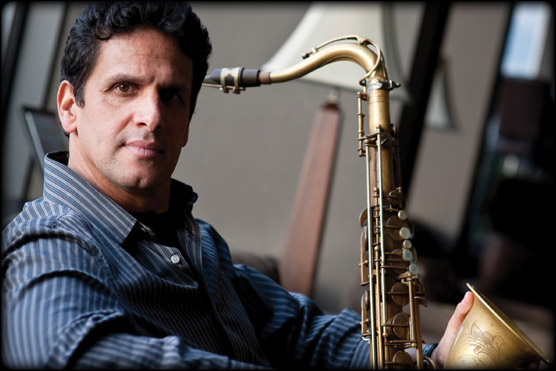
- Sharoni with his saxophone.

Background information
- Born: Kissufim, Israel
- Genres: Jazz
- Occupation: Musician
- Instrument: Tenor saxophone
- Label: Papaya
- Website: bennysharoni.com

Benny Sharoni (Hebrew: בני שרוני) is an Israeli-American saxophonist, composer and musician.

He was born in Kissufim, a kibbutz in Israel. Sharoni, served in the Israeli Army for three years. Due to Sharoni's interest in Jazz, Sharoni came to Massachusetts to study at the Berklee School of Music where he was mentored by saxophonists, George Garzone and Jerry Bergonzi.

== Discography ==
- Giant Step, Boston 2001; with Artie Barbato, trumpet; Joe Barbato, piano; John Lockwood, bass; Peter Moutis, drums; Damian Padro, congas.
- Eternal Elixer, Boston 2009; with Barry Ries, trumpet; Joe Barbato, piano; Kyle Aho, piano; Mike Mele, guitar.
- Slant Signature, Boston 2014; with Jim Rotondi, trumpet; Joe Barbato, piano; Mike Mele, guitar; Todd Baker, bass; Steve Langone, drums.
