= Cory Weeds =

Canadian jazz saxophonist

- Born: 1975 (age 50–51); Burnaby, British Columbia
- Instruments: Tenor saxophone, alto saxophone

Cory Weeds (born 1973) is a Canadian jazz saxophonist and impresario. He is the founder and owner of the Cellar Music Group record label.

Weeds has performed alongside musicians including Jeff Hamtilon, Pat Bianchi, David Fathead Newman, Christian McBride, Joey DeFrancesco, Peter Bernstein (guitarist), Eric Alexander (jazz saxophonist), Mike LeDonne, and Joe Farnsworth.

== Early life and education ==
Weeds was born and raised in Burnaby, British Columbia. His interest in jazz began in secondary school, which he then chose to pursue in his post-secondary education, attending Capilano University and University of North Texas.

== Cellar Jazz Club ==
At the age of 26, Weeds purchased a jazz club which would become the Cellar Jazz Club. This led to the establishment of the Cellar Live/Cellar Music Group recor According to The Sage International Encyclopedia of Music and Culture, American jazz magazine DownBeat named Cory Weeds' Cellar on its list of the world's greatest jazz clubs. The Cellar Jazz Club shut down in 2014. Weeds has since continued to book musicians at Frankie's Jazz Club in Downtown Vancouver and the Shadbolt Centre for the Arts in Burnaby.

In February 2023, Cellar Music Group was awarded their first Grammy Award for Best Large Jazz Ensemble Album. The Grammy was awarded to Steven Feifke and Bijon Watson's Generation Gap Jazz Orchestra for their album Generation Gap Jazz Orchestra.

== Discography ==
- Big Weeds (2008) - with Mike LeDonne
- Everything's Coming Up Weeds (2009)
- The Many Deeds of Cory Weeds (2010) - with Joey DeFrancesco
- Just Like That (2011)
- Up a Step: The Music of Hank Mobley (2012)
- With Benefits (2013) - with Bill Coon Quartet
- Let's Go! (2013)
- As of Now (2014)
- Condition Blue: The Music of Jackie McLean (2015)
- This Happy Madness with Jeff Hamilton Trio (Cellar Live, 2015)
- It's Easy to Remember featuring David Hazeltine (Cellar Live, 2016)
- Let's Groove: The Music of Earth, Wind & Fire (2017)
- Dreamsville (2017) - with Jeff Hamilton Trio
- Explosion (2018) - Cory Weeds Little Big Band
- Live at Frankie's Jazz Club (2019)
- Dream a Little (2019) - with Champain Fulton (duo)
- Day by Day (2020)
- O Sole Mio! Music from the Motherland (2021)
- Cory Weeds With Strings: What Is There to Say? (2021)
- Just Coolin' (2022)
- Home Cookin' (2023) - Cory Weeds Little Big Band
- Every Now and Then (2024) - with Champain Fulton (duo)
- Horns Locked (2025) - with Nick Hempton
- Cory Weeds Meets Jerry Weldon (Cellar Music Group, 2025)
- Hip To Be Square/Plays Huey Lewis & The News (Cellar Music Group, 2026)

=== With The Night Crawlers ===
- Presenting (2007)
- Down in the Bottom (2011)
- Volume 3 (2013)
- Do You Know a Good Thing (2021)
- Get Ready (2023)
