= Vincent Herring =

American jazz musician (born 1964)

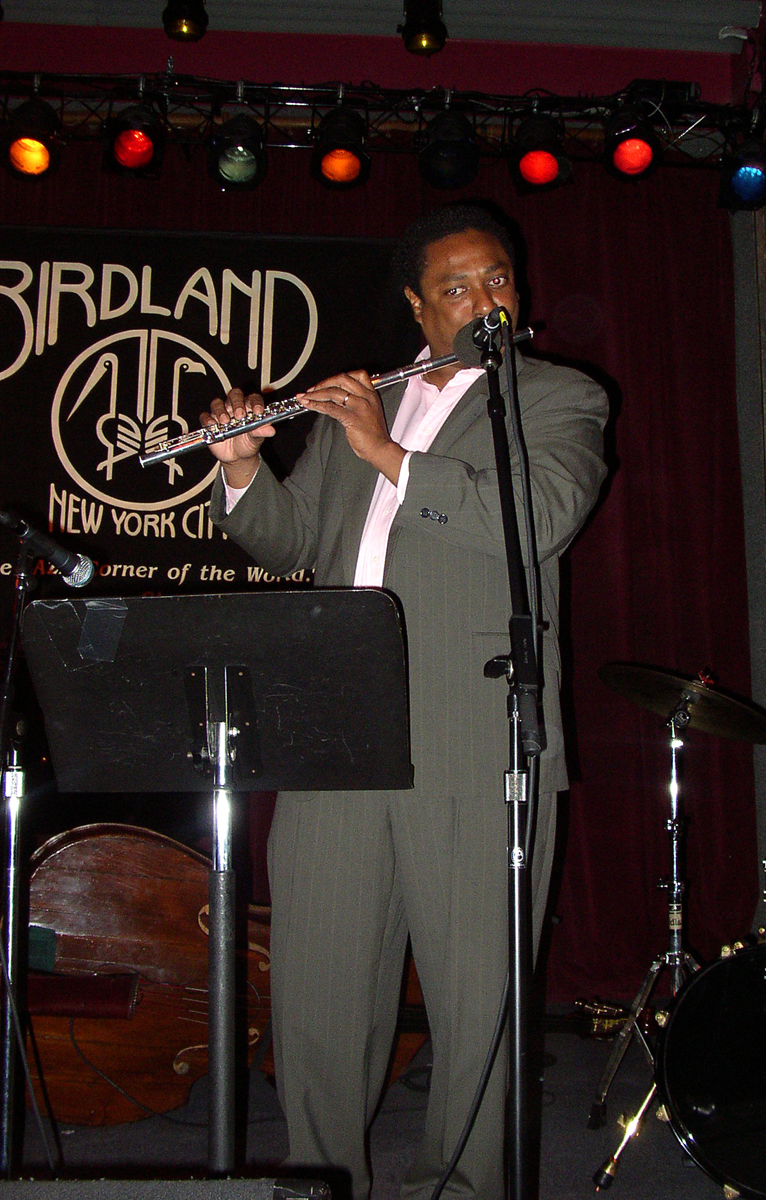
- Herring at Birdland, New York City

Background information
- Born: Vincent Dwyne Herring; November 19, 1964 (age 61); Hopkinsville, Kentucky, U.S.
- Genre: Jazz
- Occupations: Musician, educator
- Instruments: Saxophone, flute
- Years active: 1982–present
- Labels: Landmark, MusicMasters, HighNote, Smoke Sessions
- Website: VincentHerring.com
- Military service
- Allegiance: United States
- Branch: United States Army
- Service years: 1980–1982
- Unit: USMA Band

Vincent Dwyne Herring (born November 19, 1964) is an American jazz saxophonist, flautist, composer, and educator. Known for his fiery and soulful playing in the bands of Horace Silver, Freddie Hubbard, and Nat Adderley in the earlier stages of his career, he now frequently performs around the world with his own groups and is heavily involved in jazz education.

== Biography ==
He was born in Hopkinsville, Kentucky, United States. His parents divorced, and he and his mother moved to California. When he was 11, he started playing saxophone in school bands and studying privately at Dean Frederick's School of Music in Vallejo, California. At age 16, he entered California State University, Chico on a music scholarship.

A year later, Herring auditioned for the United States Military Academy band, Jazz Knights, playing lead alto sax. He moved to West Point and served one enlisted tour. In 1982 he moved to New York City attending Long Island University.

Herring first toured the United States and Europe as part of the Lionel Hampton Big Band. His talents came to the attention of Nat Adderley, and the two forged a nine-year musical relationship that led to nine albums and touring around the world year after year. After Adderley's death, Herring collaborated with former Cannonball Adderley bandmember Louis Hayes to form the Cannonball Adderley Legacy Band. He also worked and recorded with pianist Cedar Walton for over two decades. He has also appeared on stage or recordings with Dizzy Gillespie, Horace Silver, Art Blakey and the Jazz Messengers, Jack DeJohnette's Special Edition, Freddie Hubbard, James Carter, Larry Coryell, Steve Turre, the Mingus Big Band, Billy Taylor, Nancy Wilson, Kenny Barron, Roy Hargrove, Arthur Taylor, Carla Bley, Mike LeDonne, Eric Alexander, Wallace Roney, Carl Allen, Bobby Watson, Gary Bartz, Sonny Fortune, Cyrus Chestnut, Jeremy Pelt, Joe Farnsworth, and the Phil Woods Sax Machine (a band augmenting Woods' regular quintet to an octet with three additional alto saxophonists). Herring has appeared as a special guest soloist with Wynton Marsalis at Lincoln Center as well as with Jon Faddis and The Carnegie Hall Big Band.

Herring has recorded over 20 albums as a leader and over 250 as a sideman. In addition to the Cannonball Adderley Legacy Band, Herring's other projects include Something Else, The Battle with Vincent Herring and Eric Alexander, The Vincent Herring-Joris Dudli's Soul Jazz Alliance, Earth Jazz Agents, and Jazz The Story.

Herring has taken bands to Japan, Europe, and China on several occasions and has appeared in nearly every major jazz festival in the world. He is also involved in jazz education as a professor at William Paterson University and Manhattan School of Music. In 2024, Herring published his jazz improvisation method book, Logic and Critical Thinking in Jazz Improvisation, with Sher Music, which focuses on distilling his original improvisation concepts and techniques.

== Discography ==
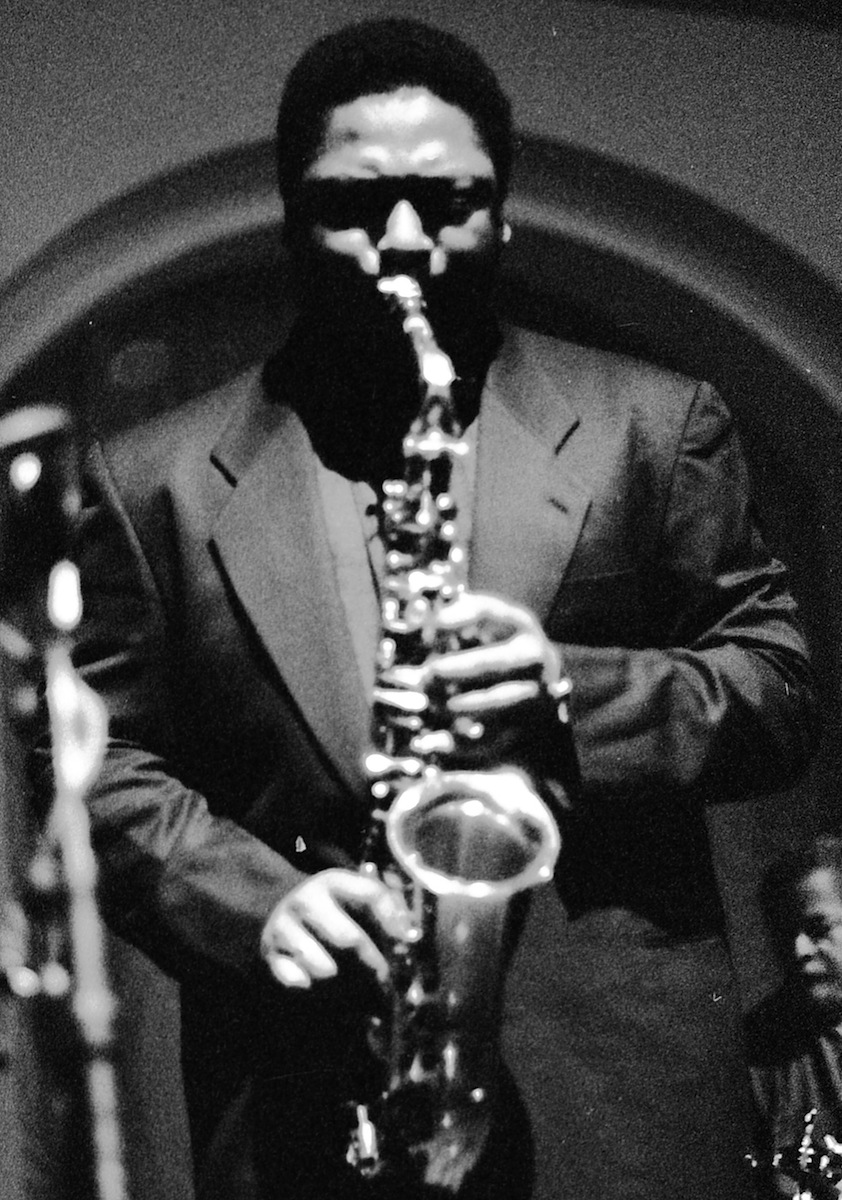
Vincent Herring performing with the Nat Adderley Quintet, 1993

=== As leader/co-leader ===
- 1989 Scene One (Evidence)
- 1990 American Experience (MusicMasters)
- 1991 Evidence (Landmark)
- 1993 Dawnbird (Landmark)
- 1993 Secret Love (MusicMasters)
- 1994 Folklore: Live at the Village Vanguard (MusicMasters)
- 1994 The Days of Wine & Roses (MusicMasters)
- 1995 Don't Let It Go (MusicMasters)
- 1997 Change the World (MusicMasters)
- 1999 Jobim for Lovers (MusicMasters)
- 2001 Simple Pleasure (HighNote)
- 2001 Burn'in the Blues (Consolidated Artists Productions) with Jeff Palmer, John Abercrombie, Bob Leto
- 2003 All Too Real (HighNote)
- 2004 Mr. Wizard (HighNote)
- 2005 The Battle: Live at Smoke (HighNote)
- 2006 Ends and Means (HighNote)
- 2007 Live at Smoke (SGM)
- 2010 Morning Star (Challenge)
- 2011 Friendly Fire: Live at Smoke (HighNote)
- 2012 In the Spirit of Coltrane and Cannonball (Yanagisawa)
- 2014 The Uptown Shuffle (Smoke Sessions)
- 2015 Night and Day (Smoke Sessions)
- 2017 Hard Times (Smoke Sessions)
- 2019 Bird at 100 (Smoke Sessions)
- 2021 Preaching to the Choir (Smoke Sessions)
- 2024 Soul Jazz (Smoke Sessions)
- 2025 Split Decision (Smoke Sessions)

=== As a member ===
Carl Allen & Manhattan Projects

- The Dark Side of Dewey (Alfa Jazz, 1992)
- Echoes of Our Heroes (Alfa Jazz, 1993)
- We Remember Cannonball (Alfa Jazz, 1997)

Alto Summit
With Antonio Hart, Phil Woods, Ruben Rogers, Carl Allen and Anthony Wonsey

- Alto Legacy (Key'stone, 1995)

Mingus Big Band

- ¡Que Viva Mingus (Dreyfus, 1997)
- Blues & Politics (Dreyfus, 1999)
- Three of Four Shades of Love (Dreyfus, 2002)
- Tonight at Noon (Dreyfus, 2002)

The Heavy Hitters
With Eric Alexander and Mike LeDonne

- Heavy Hitters (Cellar Music, 2023) – rec. 2022
- That's What's Up! (Cellar Music, 2024) – rec. 2023

=== As sideman ===
With Nat Adderley

- We Remember Cannon (In + Out, 1989)
- Talkin' About You (Landmark, 1990)
- Autumn Leaves: Live at Sweet Basil (Bellaphon, 1991)
- Work Song: Live at Sweet Basil (Bellaphon, 1991)
- The Old Country (Alfa Jazz, 1991)
- A Night in Manhattan (Alfa Jazz, 1992)
- Workin' (Timeless, 1993)
- Live at Floating Jazz Fest (Chiaroscuro, 1996)[2CD]

With Carl Allen

- Piccadilly Square w/Roy Hargrove (Timeless, 1993)
- The Pursuer (Atlantic, 1994)
- Testimonial (Atlantic, 1995)

With Don Braden

- The Voice of the Saxophone (BMG, 1997)
- Contemporary Standards Ensemble (Double-Time, 2000)

With Good Fellas

- Good Fellas (Paddle Wheel, 1992)
- 2 (Paddle Wheel, 1992)
- 3 (Paddle Wheel, 1993)

With John Hicks

- In the Mix (Landmark, 1995)
- Piece for My Peace (Landmark, 1996)

With Freddie Hubbard

- Bolivia (Musicmasters, 1991)
- MMTC: Monk, Miles, Trane & Cannon (Musicmasters, 1995)

With Harold Mabern

- Mabern Plays Mabern (Smoke Sessions, 2020)
- Mabern Plays Coltrane (Smoke Sessions, 2022)

With Barney McAll

- Exit (ABC Jazz, 1995)
- Blueprints (Jazzhead, 2011)

With Ferit Odman

- Nommo (Equinox, 2010)
- Autumn in New/York (Equinox, 2011)

With Cedar Walton

- Composer (Astor Place, 1996)
- The Promise Land (HighNote, 2001)
- One Flight Down (HighNote, 2006)
- Seasoned Wood (HighNote, 2008)
- Voices Deep Within (HighNote, 2009)
- The Bouncer (HighNote, 2011)

With others

- Eddie Allen, Another Point of View (Enja, 1993)
- Donald Brown, People Music (Muse, 1991)
- Joe Chambers, Mirrors (Blue Note, 1999)
- Jacob Chung, The Sage (Cellar Music, 2024)
- Leon Lee Dorsey, The Watcher (Landmark, 1995)
- Dave Ellis, State of Mind (Milestone, 2003)
- Johannes Enders, Quiet Fire (Enja, 2000)
- Giacomo Gates, Centerpiece (Origin, 2005)
- Tim Hagans & Marcus Printup, Hubsongs – The Music of Freddie Hubbard (Blue Note, 1998)
- Louis Hayes, Dreamin of Cannonball (TCB, 2002)
- Kevin Hays, Sweet Ear (SteepleChase, 1991)
- Jihee Heo, Flow (OA2, 2024)
- Lainie Kazan, Body & Soul (Musicmasters, 1995)
- Johnny King, In From the Cold (Criss Cross, 1994)
- Klüvers Big Band, A Tribute To Duke (Music Mecca, 1999)
- Yoichi Kobayashi, Sukiyaki (What's New, 2002)
- Patty Lomuscio, Star Crossed Lovers (Challenge, 2022)
- Gloria Lynne, No Detour Ahead (Muse, 1993)
- Jill McCarron, Gin (Jazz Bird, 2024)
- Ron McClure, Never Forget (SteepleChase, 1991)
- Linda Presgrave, Along the Path (Metropolitan, 2015)
- Benard Purdie, Benard Purdie's Soul To Jazz 2 (ACT, 1997)
- Melvin Rhyne, To Cannonball with Love (Paddle Wheel, 1993)
- Marcus Roberts, Portraits in Blue (Sony, 1996)
- Louis Smith, Strike Up the Band (SteepleChase, 1991)
- Steve Turre, The Spirits Up Above (HighNote, 2004)
- Elio Villafranca, Standing By The Crossroads (ArtistShare, 2024)
- Scott Wendholt, Scheme of Things (Criss Cross, 1993)
