= Folklore: Live at the Village Vanguard =

Live album by Vincent Herring
- Released: 1994
- Recorded: November 26–28, 1993
- Venue: Village Vanguard, NYC
- Genre: Jazz
- Length: 56:03
- Label: MusicMasters
- Producer: Big Apple Productions Inc.

Vincent Herring chronology
Secret Love (1993)	Folklore: Live at the Village Vanguard (1994)	The Days of Wine and Roses (1994)

Folklore: Live at the Village Vanguard is an album by saxophonist Vincent Herring which was recorded at the Village Vanguard in late 1993 and released on the MusicMasters label the following year.

== Reception ==
Professional ratings
Review scores
Source	Rating
AllMusic	3/5 stars

The AllMusic review by Brian Bartolini stated "The band is tight, and plays with soulfulness and swing. The music is enjoyable and makes for a pleasant listen, yet doesn't break any new ground. ... Folklore is a solid effort. It will please many fans of live, bop-oriented jazz and not offend any".

== Track listing ==
All compositions by Vincent Herring except where noted

1. "Folklore" – 6:22
2. "Theme for Delores" – 6:09
3. "The Girl Next Door" (Vincent Youmans, Otto Harbach, Schuyler Greene) – 7:58
4. "Romantic Journey" (Cyrus Chestnut) – 7:58
5. "Fountainhead" – 7:59
6. "Window of Opportunity" (Scott Wendholt) – 8:36
7. "This I Dig of You" (Hank Mobley) – 8:36
8. "Mo's Theme" (Rob Bargad) – 2:25

== Personnel ==
- Vincent Herring - alto saxophone
- Scott Wendholdt – trumpet
- Cyrus Chestnut – piano
- Ira Coleman – bass
- Carl Allen – drums
