= Smoke (jazz club) =

Smoke Jazz & Supper Club
- Interactive map of Smoke Jazz & Supper Club

Restaurant information
- Established: April 9, 1999 — Smoke; 1976–1998 — Augie's
- Owners: Paul Stache; Molly Sparrow Johnson
- Location: 2751 Broadway, Manhattan, New York City
- Website: www.smokejazz.com

Smoke Jazz & Supper Club is a jazz club located at 2751 Broadway on the Upper West Side of Manhattan in New York City. The club was opened on April 9, 1999 by co-founders Paul Stache and Frank Christopher and is currently owned by Stache and his wife and partner Molly Sparrow Johnson. The venue has hosted numerous renowned jazz artists and in 2014 launched an associated record label, Smoke Sessions Records.

== History ==
Smoke occupies the space formerly known as Augie’s Jazz Bar. A native of the former West Berlin, Germany, Paul Stache worked at Augie’s as a server and bartender after moving into New York City. When owner Augusto “Gus” Cuartas closed the club in 1998, Stache and Christopher partnered to take over the venue. Stache and Johnson assumed ownership of the club in 2019.

Smoke opened on April 9, 1999 with an inaugural performance by saxophonist George Coleman’s Quartet featuring pianist Harold Mabern. Both artists helped define the Smoke sound and became frequent performers at the club. Mabern asserted that “Smoke is the greatest jazz club in the world.” Smoke’s name was inspired by writer Paul Auster who based his character Auggie Wren on Cuartas. Harvey Keitel portrayed Auggie in the 1995 film Smoke, the title of which gave the club its name.

Artists who have performed at the club include Wynton Marsalis, Ron Carter, Benny Golson, Hank Jones, Christian McBride, Brad Mehldau, Larry Goldings, Chris Potter, Vincent Herring, Tom Harrell, Cecil Payne, Cedar Walton, Steve Turre, Eric Alexander, Bill Charlap, Jimmy Cobb, Charles Earland, Nicholas Payton, Peter Bernstein, Eddie Henderson and others.

During the COVID-19 pandemic Stache and Johnson launched a series of livestream concerts, Smoke Screens, and undertook a renovation that expanded the club into two small neighboring spaces.

== Smoke Sessions Records ==
After recording and producing several recordings for artists and labels at Smoke, Stache was encouraged to launch an affiliated record label, Smoke Sessions Records in 2014. Early releases continued to be recorded live on stage at Smoke, but the label’s output soon expanded to include studio recordings. Smoke Sessions has garnered two Grammy Award nominations for releases by pianist Orrin Evans' Captain Black Big Band.

Smoke Sessions has released albums by Harold Mabern, Nicholas Payton, Vincent Herring, Peter Bernstein, Renee Rosnes, Eddie Henderson, George Coleman, Bobby Watson, Steve Davis, The Cookers, Cyrus Chestnut, Larry Goldings, Wayne Escoffery, Gary Bartz, Jimmy Cobb, Mary Stallings, Al Foster, Buster Williams and others.

== See also ==
- List of supper clubs
