= Smoke Sessions Records =

Independent record label based in New York City

- Founded: 2014
- Founder: Frank Christopher, Paul Stache
- Genre: Jazz
- Country of origin: United States
- Location: New York City
- Official website: smokesessionsrecords.com

Smoke Sessions Records is an independent jazz record label based in New York City.

== History ==
Smoke jazz club started the label in 2014. The co-founders were Frank Christopher and Paul Stache; Damon Smith was added to the organization soon afterwards.

In its first year, a vinyl sampler and nine CDs were released. The music is mostly post-bop jazz. Early releases included recordings led by Harold Mabern, Vincent Herring, Javon Jackson, and David Hazeltine. They were recorded in concert at the club and were engineered by Stache.

== Practices ==
Releases are usually taken from recordings of concerts in the club. A late 2014 list of recording equipment included: "a matched pair of Schoeps Mk. 4 and a Neuman U87 microphones on the piano; U47 and Royer 122Vs on tenor sax; RCA 77 ribbons on alto sax; a vintage RCA Type 44 and a Coles 4038 on trumpets; an RCA 44 and Sennheister 409 on bass; and, for drums, a pair of Neuman KM84s and a Coles 4038 overhead, a D12 or FET47 on the bass drum, and an SM57 on the snare".
