= It's All in the Game =

It's All in the Game may refer to:

In music:

- "It's All in the Game" (song), a 1958 song by Tommy Edwards
- It's All in the Game (Merle Haggard album), 1984
- It's All in the Game (Nena album), 1985
- It's All in the Game (Eric Alexander album), 2005
- It's All in the Game, a 2001 album by Engelbert Humperdinck

In television:

- It's All in the Game (game show), a Dutch television game show
- "It's All in the Game" (Columbo), an episode of the TV series Columbo
