= SpangaS in Actie =

2015 Dutch teen film

- Theatrical release poster
- Directed by: Jop de Vries
- Written by: Jop de Vries; Pieter Athmer
- Based on: SpangaS by Anya Koek
- Produced by: Joris van Wijk; Alain de Levita
- Cinematography: Daan Nieuwenhuijs
- Edited by: Manuel Rombley
- Music by: Martijn Schimmer; Matthijs Kieboom
- Production companies: NL Film & TV; NCRV
- Distributed by: Dutch FilmWorks; Buena Vista International
- Release date: 18 June 2015
- Running time: 80 minutes
- Country: Netherlands
- Language: Dutch
- Box office: $1.1 million

SpangaS in Actie is a 2015 teen film based on the soap series SpangaS and a stand-alone sequel to SpangaS op Survival.

The film was released on 18 June 2015 by Dutch FilmWorks. The film won a Golden Film award for having drawn over 100,000 spectators.

== Cast ==
- Ricardo Blei as Abel Brandt
- Lennart Timmerman as Raphael 'Raaf' de Ridder
- Hassan Slaby as Eman Loukili
- Guillermo Hilversum as Tinco Benoît
- Dilara Horuz as Meral Daldal
- Djamila Abdalla as Bodil de la Aize
- Priscilla Knetemann as Charley Bogaarts
- Stijn Fransen as Renée Krul
- Timo Wils as Lef Evers
- Vajèn van den Bosch as Juliëtte Vrolijks
- Steef Hupkes as Jochem Damstra
- Judy Doorman as "Miss" Madge Jansen
- Pepijn Schoneveld as Frits van Veen

== Release ==
=== Home media ===
The film was released on DVD on 16 October 2015.
