= Josine van Dalsum =

Dutch actress and writer (1948–2009)

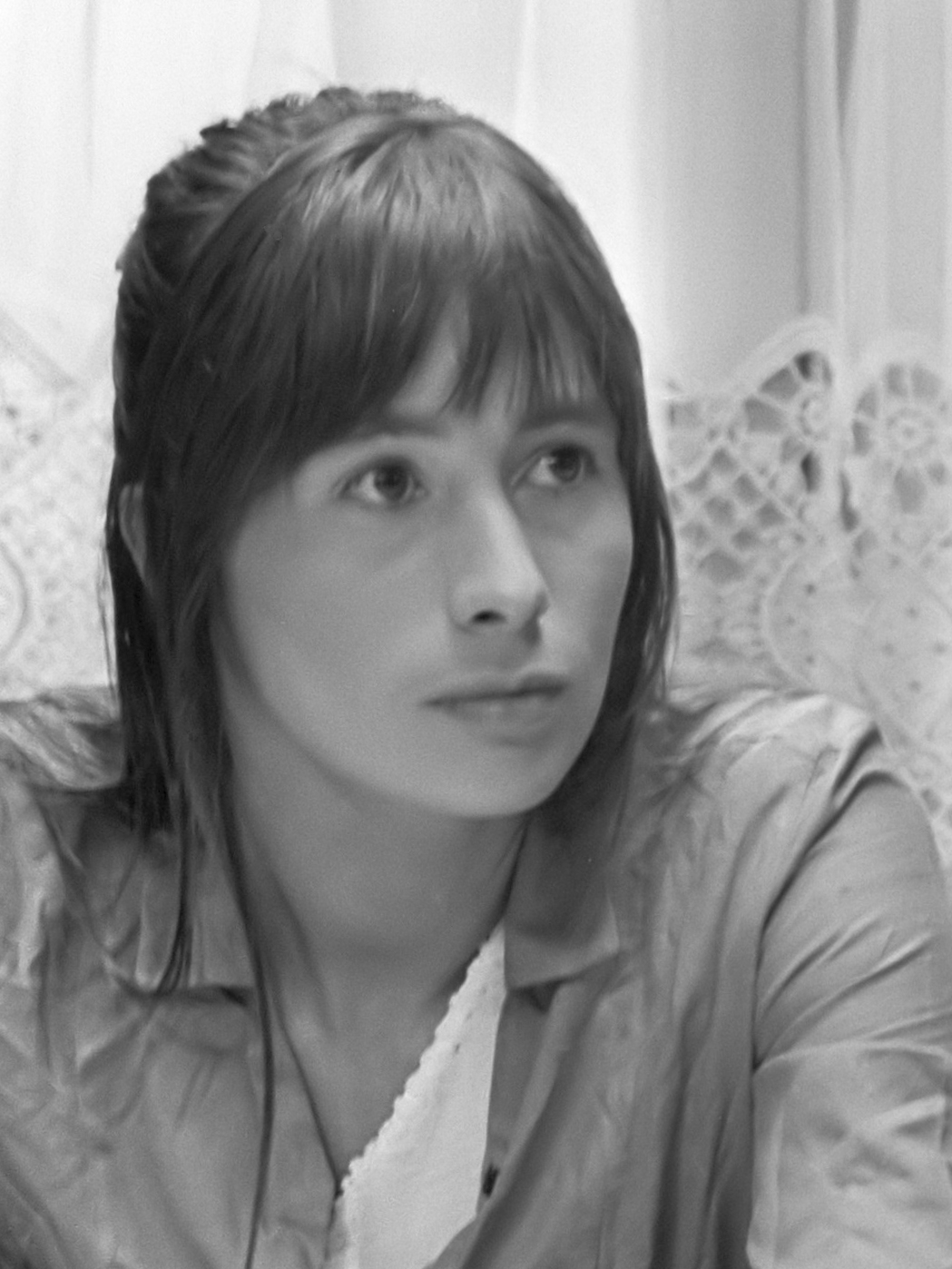
- Josine van Dalsum in 1973
- Born: Josina Johanna van Dalsum; 14 July 1948; Breda, Netherlands
- Died: 17 November 2009 (aged 61); Amsterdam, Netherlands
- Occupations: Actress, writer
- Spouse: John van de Rest (m. 1974)
- Children: Aram van de Rest

Josina Johanna van Dalsum (14 July 1948 – 17 November 2009) was a Dutch actress and writer who worked in television, film, and theatre. She later became active as a novelist and visual artist.

== Early life and education ==
Van Dalsum was born in Breda, North Brabant and grew up in a large Catholic family with ten children. Her father was an amateur actor. She attended secondary school in Oosterhout (Noord-Brabant) and later studied at the toneelschool in Amsterdam from 1967 to 1971. During her studies she began acting for television, including a role in the children's series Orimoa broadcast by the NCRV.

== Career ==
After a short period with the Nieuw Rotterdams Toneel in 1971–1972, van Dalsum mainly focused on television and film. She made her major television breakthrough in 1973 as Jet in Een mens van goede wil, based on a novel by Gerard Walschap and directed by John van de Rest, whom she married the following year. Van Dalsum later gained wide public recognition for roles such as Jeanne d’Arc in Heilige Jeanne (1978) and the title role in the television series Mata Hari (1980), which was also broadcast internationally.

Throughout the 1980s she appeared frequently in television productions and films, including The Lift (1983), directed by Dick Maas. Van Dalsum also continued to perform in theatre and began writing novels, notably Ik, Mata Hari (1981) and De Kleine Johanna (2007). In addition, she worked as a screenwriter on the German crime series Die Wache.

== Later life and death ==
In 2003 van Dalsum was diagnosed with lung cancer, later complicated by inoperable brain tumours. Despite her illness, she remained artistically active, performing in the play Leef-tijd and exhibiting her visual art. This included a solo exhibition at the Museum Jan van der Togt in Amstelveen. In July 2009 van Dalsum was appointed a Knight of the Order of Orange-Nassau. She died in Amsterdam on 17 November 2009 after a long illness. She chose to be euthanasized.

== Filmography (selection) ==
- The Lift (1983)
- De Leeuw van Vlaanderen (1984)
- Zus & Zo (2001)

== Television (selection) ==
- Een mens van goede wil (1973)
- Hollands Glorie (1976)
- Heilige Jeanne (1978)
- Kant aan m'n broek! (1978, six episodes)
- Mata Hari (1980)
- Baantjer (2003, one episode)
- De Erfenis (2004)
- Die Wache (as screenwriter)

== Theatre (selection) ==
- De Speeltuin (1971)
- Nonsens! (1987)
- Huwelijkspel (1989)
- Leef-Tijd (2005)
- Vleugellam (2008)
