= Ghislaine Pierie =

Dutch actress and film director (1969–2023)

- Born: 13 September 1969; Ede, Netherlands
- Died: 27 January 2023 (aged 53)
- Education: Maastricht Academy of Dramatic Arts; Academy of Theatre and Dance
- Occupations: Actress; Film director Stage director
- Years active: 1993–2023

Ghislaine Pierie (13 September 1969 – 27 January 2023) was a Dutch actress, film director, and stage director.

== Filmography ==
=== Actress ===
- Coverstory (1995)
- 12 steden, 13 ongelukken (1996)
- Westenwind (1999–2003)
- Rozengeur & Wodka Lime (2001–2006)
- Baantjer (2002)
- Costa! (2004)
- Spoorloos verdwenen (2008)
- Moordvrouw (2012)
- Noord Zuid (2014)
- Vechtershart (2015)
- Of ik gek ben (2016)
- Doodstil (2020)
- Goede tijden, slechte tijden (2021)

=== Director ===
- Nachtegaal & Zonen (2007)
- SpangaS (2007)

== Theatre ==
=== Stage director ===
- Het huis van Belinda (1993)
- De Presidentes (1993)
