= Ederveen =

- Village
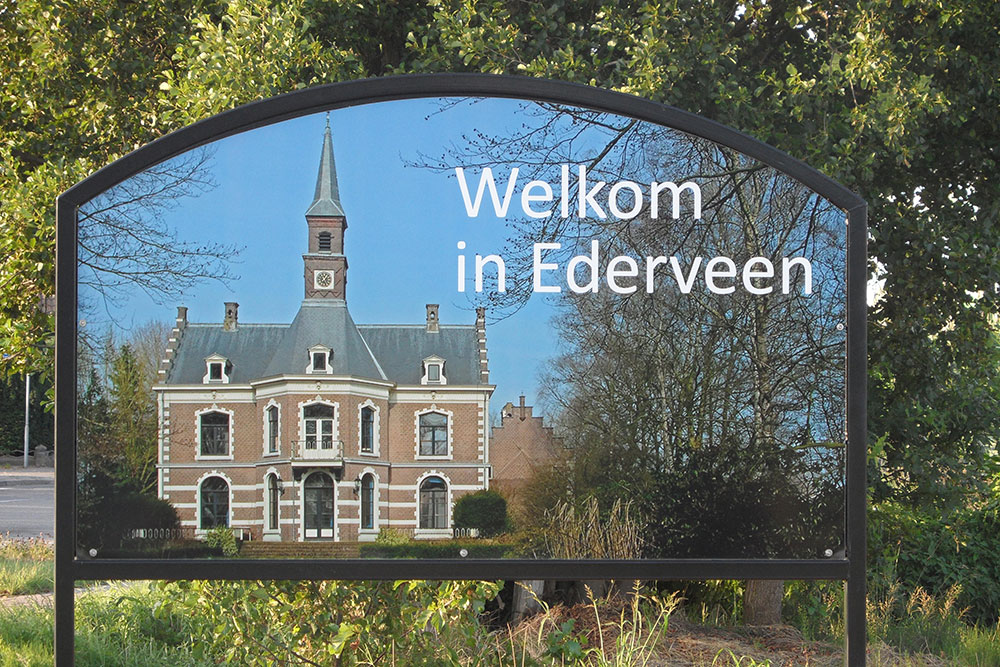

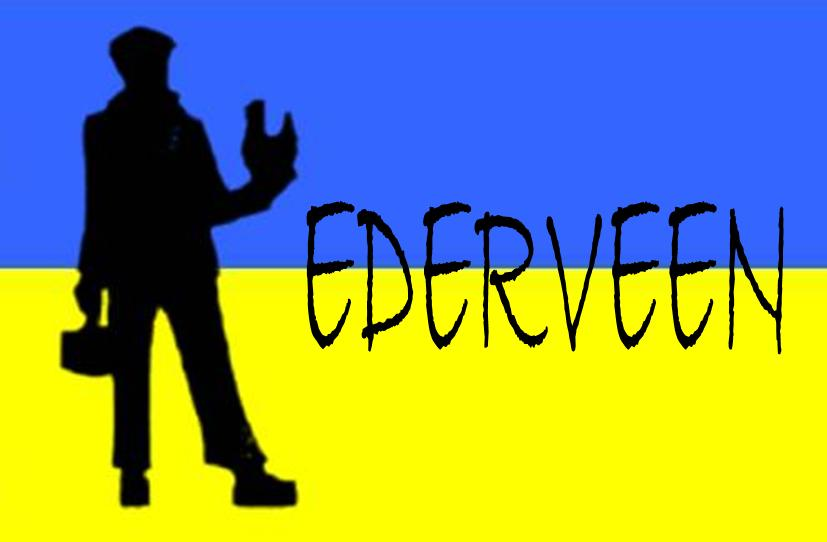
- Flag

- Map of Ede with Ederveen highlighted

- Location in the Netherlands Ederveen (Netherlands)
- Coordinates: 52°04′N 5°35′E
- Country: Netherlands
- Province: Gelderland
- Municipality: Ede

Population (2021)
  - Total: 3,685
- Time zone: UTC+1 (CET)
  - Summer (DST): UTC+2 (CEST)

Ederveen is a village in the municipality of Ede in the province of Gelderland, the Netherlands.
