= Heideweek =

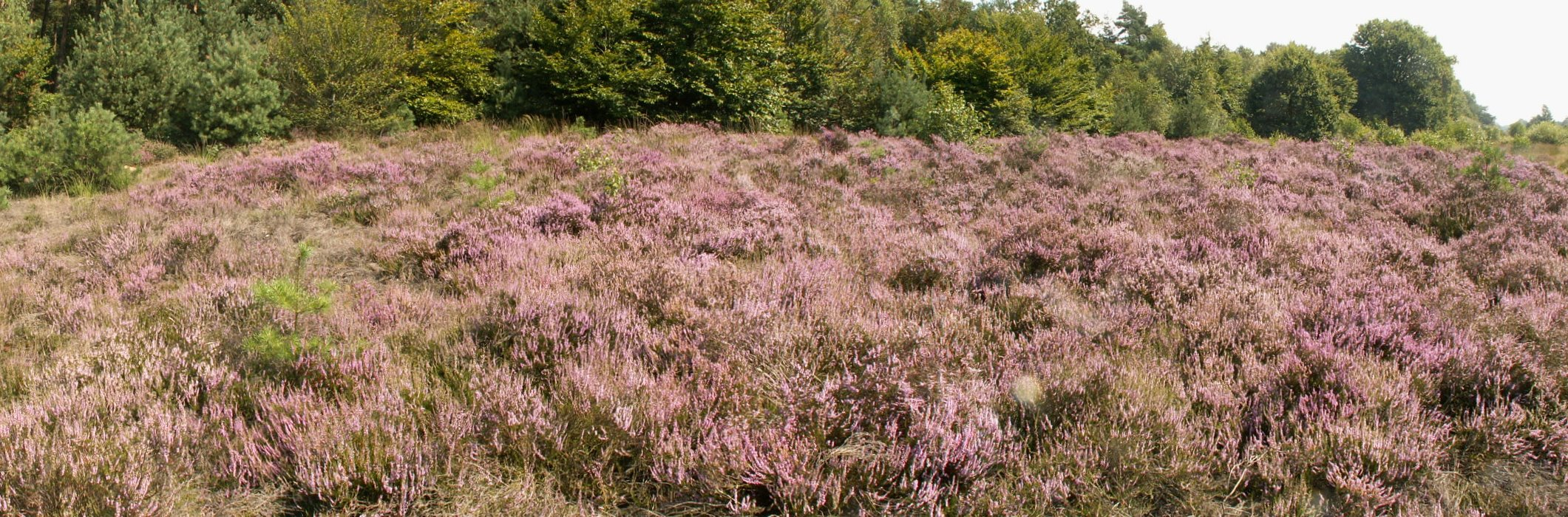
Heath in bloom near Ede

Heideweek is a week of festivities in Ede, Netherlands. Each year, the blossoming of the heath is celebrated. The people of Ede choose a heath queen and princess. A parade goes through the centre and suburbs of Ede, and festivities are scheduled for the Museum square area, including live music.

== History ==
In 1935 the chairman of the local VVV decided to organize a Heideweek. The purpose of this was to attract more tourists to Ede and thus provide more income for the local shopkeepers. It became a great success and the event was organized annually until mobilization in 1939. From 1946 to 1977, a Heideweek was not organized every year, but from 1978 it was again uninterrupted.
