= Ede Christian University of Applied Sciences =

University in The Netherlands

Coordinates: 52°01′11″N 5°39′51″E

- Christelijke Hogeschool Ede
- Motto: "overtuigend anders"
- Motto in English: "a difference that matters"
- Type: Vocational university
- Established: 1994 (after merger)
- President: Harmen van Wijnen
- Administrative staff: 400+
- Students: 4,200 (2016)
- Location: Ede, Netherlands
- Colors: green, blue
- Website: www.che.nl

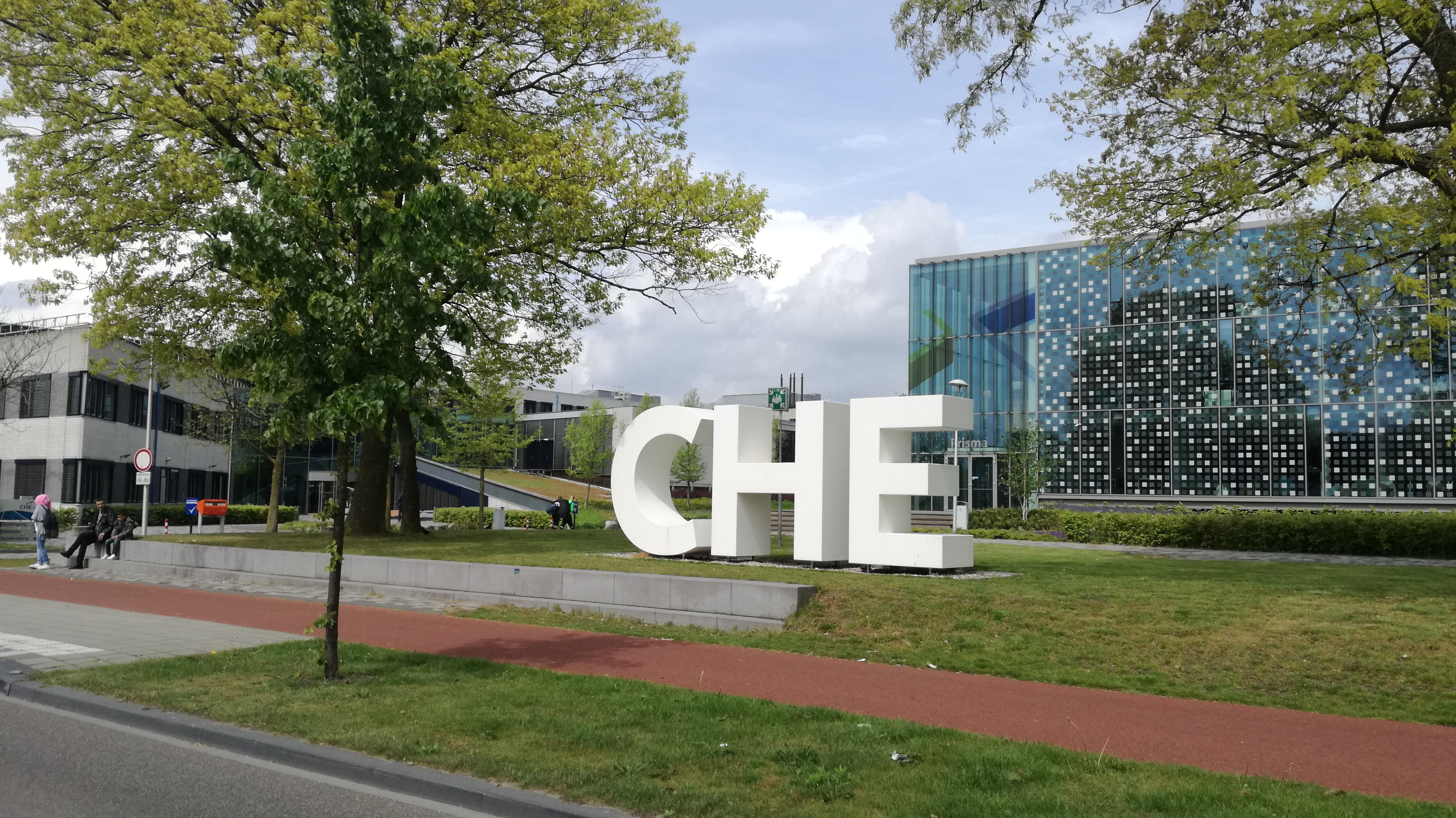
CHE abbreviation in front of the University building

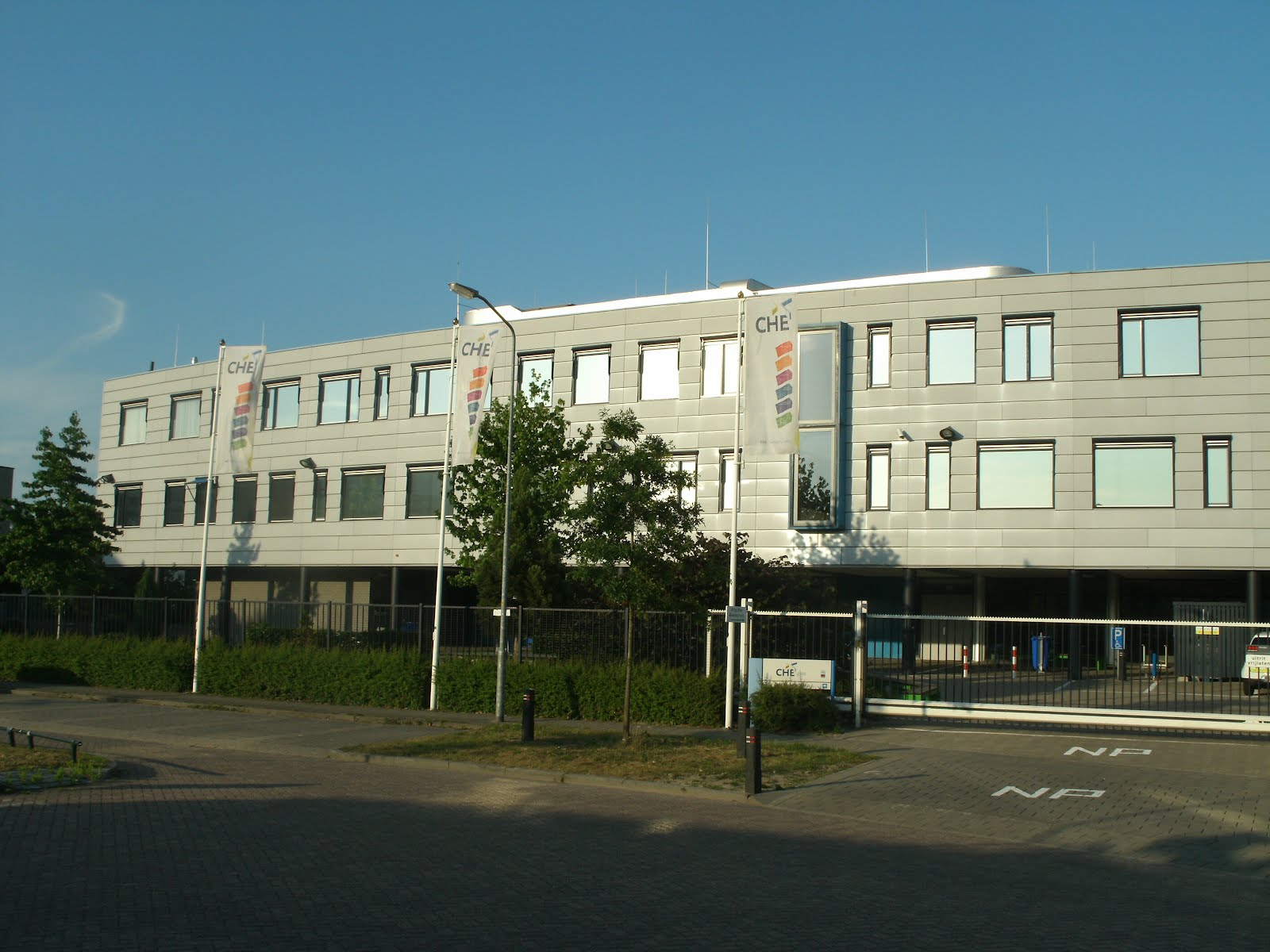
Main building of the Ede Christian University of Applied Sciences

Ede Christian University of Applied Sciences (Dutch: Christelijke Hogeschool Ede; Dutch abbreviation: CHE) is a Christian vocational university located in Ede, Netherlands. The CHE has a clear Christian basis: the Bible as norm and source of inspiration.

From 2004-2011 and in 2015, 2016 and 2017, the CHE was appointed for the eleventh time as the best university of applied sciences in the Netherlands.

== Academics ==
=== Degrees ===
All bachelor's degrees are accredited by the Accreditation Organisation of the Netherlands and Flanders (NVAO).

- Business Administration
- Human Resource Management
- Communication
- Journalism
- Social Work and Services
- Social Pedagogical Work
- Nursing
- Theology and Religion
- Religious Education
- Teacher education for primary education
- Information and communications technology (starting 2018)

International programs are available within social studies, communication studies, business studies, nursing, journalism, education and theology.

The CHE also provides services, such as media training, educational support, coaching tracks, research, organization advice programs, education for professionals or personal career counseling for non-students. This is known as CHE-Transfer and is mainly focused on markets related to the degree programs.

=== Academic year ===
A bachelor programme requires four years of full-time study (240 credits). The academic year starts September 1 and finishes the next following year on August 31. The calendar year has four periods of academic activity, which end before the summer holiday in the month of July. During the summer holiday no formal instruction is given. At the end of August, students can catch up on the work that has yet to be completed and resit for exams. During each academic period of ten weeks, students visit classes the first six to seven weeks. The remaining weeks are used for other types of educational activities, including preparing for exams.

Course-structure: most modules require the attendance of classes. A module then consists of several hours of classroom teaching or work and a number of hours of self-study. In many modules, self-study is structured by so-called study tasks (for example, library work), mini-training and assessment. Students receive detailed printed requirements per module.

=== Grading ===
Grading at the CHE:

- 10: excellent
- 9: very good
- 8: good
- 7: satisfactory (above average)
- 6: sufficient
- 0-5: failure
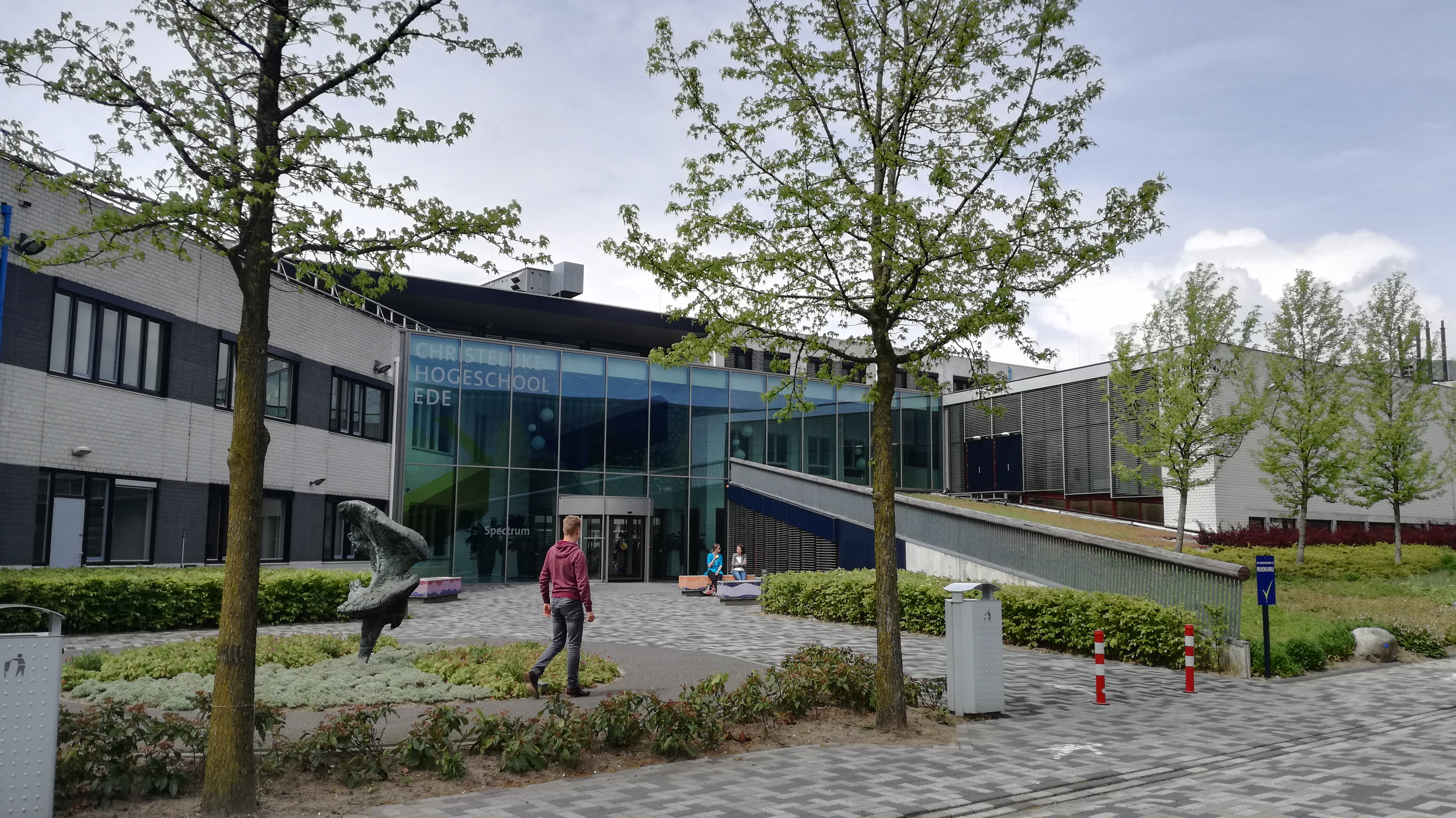
Main building, entrance

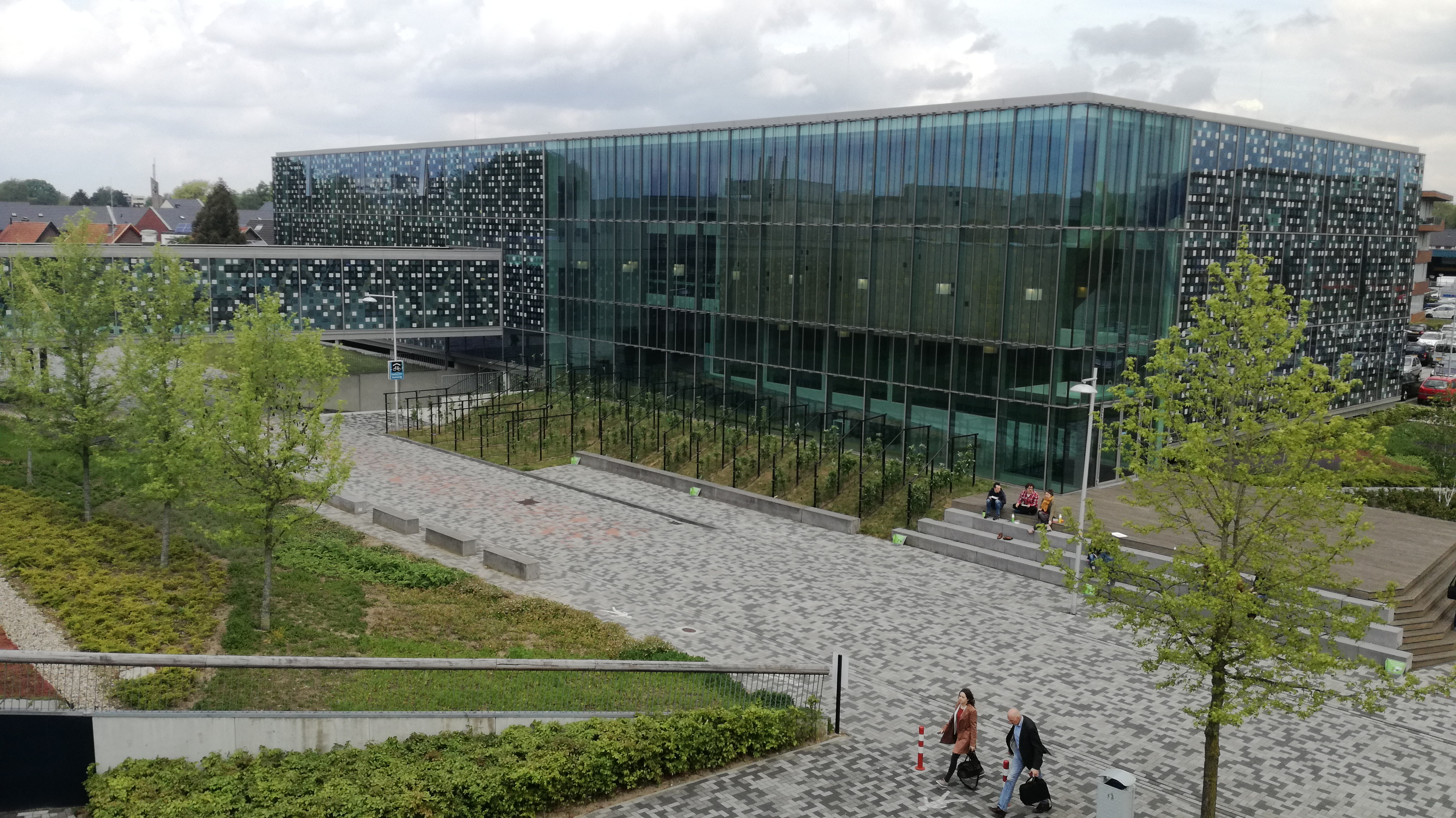
Prisma building

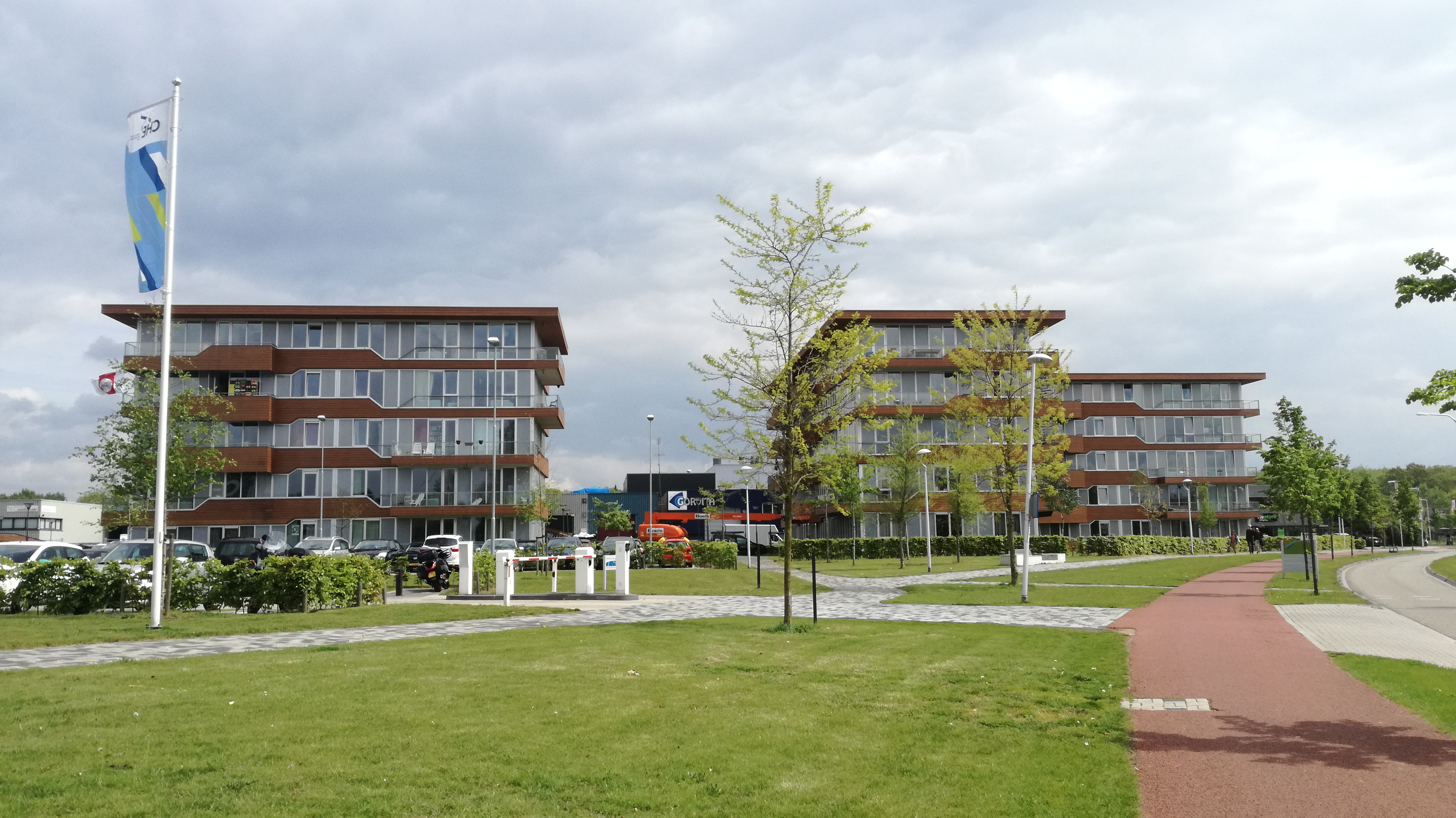
Part of the campus (student housing)

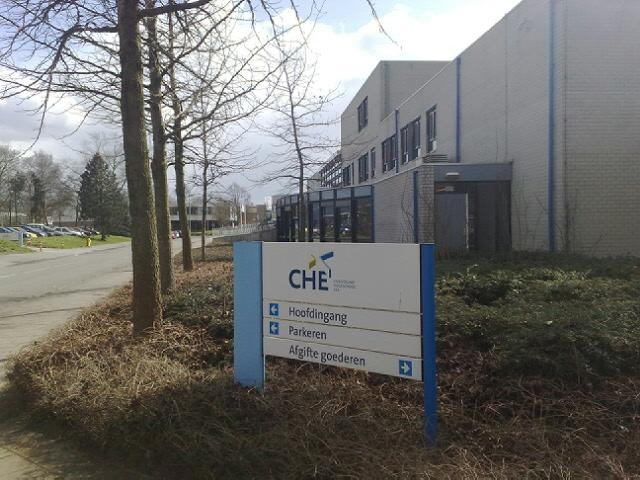
