= Help (Dutch TV series) =

- Starring: Adriaan Adriaanse; Carine Crutzen; Mies de Heer; Antonie Kamerling; René Retèl
- Country of origin: Netherlands
- Original language: Dutch

Original release
- Network: NCRV
- Release: 1994

Help is a Dutch television drama series first broadcast by the NCRV in the early 1990s.

== Content ==
Each episode in the series is an example of a story within a story: it begins with papergirl Gerrit delivering the paper to an older journalist, who then tells her and discusses with her one of the news stories he has been working on. These stories, which are all based on real events, involve themes such as sexual harassment, blackmail, etc.

== Cast ==
The papergirl, who is about thirteen years old, is played by Jonna Brenninkmeijer. Note that "Gerrit" is a masculine name, but this is in line with the character's tomboyish behaviour. The journalist is played by Eric van der Donk in earlier episodes and by John Leddy in later ones.

Guest actors include:

- Antonie Kamerling
- Elle van Rijn
- Han Römer
