= Lukkien Heliport =

Heliport Ede Lukkien Helipoort
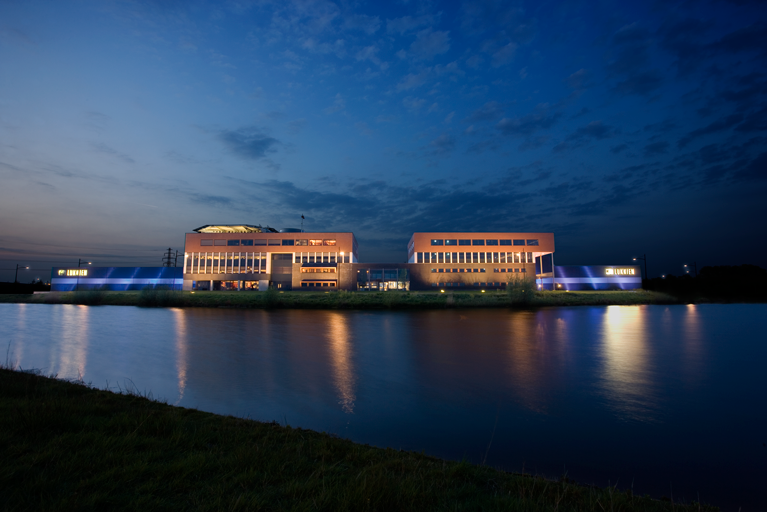
- IATA: none; ICAO: none

Summary
- Airport type: Private
- Owner: Lukkien bv
- Location: Ede, Gelderland
- Built: 12 December 2003
- Coordinates: 52°01′21.9″N 005°37′25.6″E
- Website: www.helihaven.nl
- Interactive map of Heliport Ede
- Private heliport, explicit permission needed from owner

Lukkien Heliport or Ede heliport is a small private heliport on top of the office building of Lukkien, a Dutch producer of marketing communication services (advertising). It is located in the middle of the country alongside the A12 motorway just south-west of Ede, The Netherlands.

As it is a private facility, explicit permission is needed to use the heliport. The main user of the facility is the owner to ferry clients to and from Amsterdam Schiphol Airport or other locations.

== Navigation ==
The port has lights according to ICAO-Annex 14 rules. Lukkien radio listens on 131.775 MHz but there is no permanent watch. For pilots a standard approach map is available on-line.
