= De Klomp =

- Village
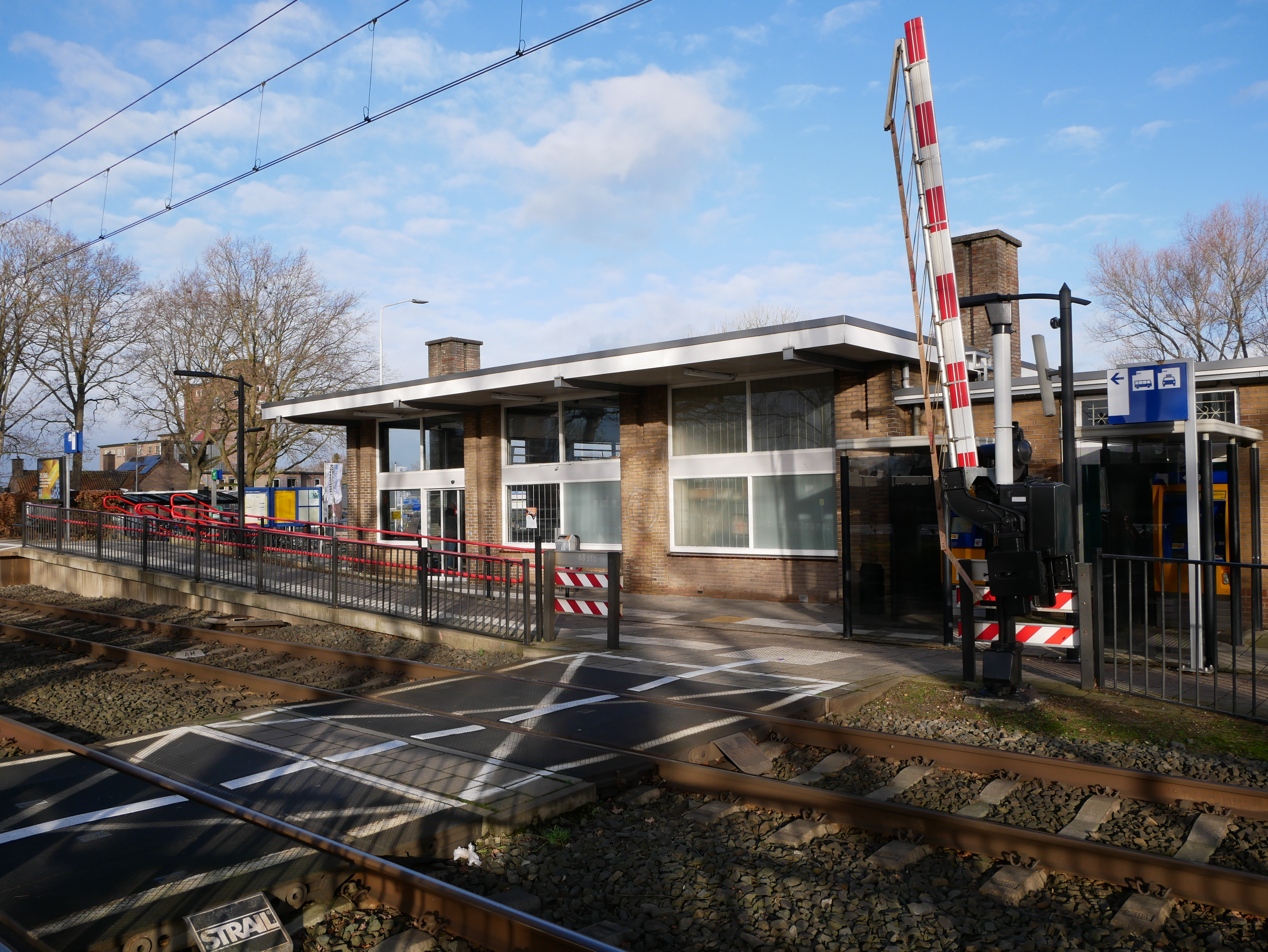
- Railway station

- Location in the Netherlands De Klomp (Netherlands)
- Coordinates: 52°2′40″N 5°34′18″E
- Country: Netherlands
- Province: Gelderland
- Municipality: Ede

Area
  - Total: 2.44 km^{2} (0.94 sq mi)
- Elevation: 8 m (26 ft)

Population (2021)
  - Total: 460
  - Density: 190/km^{2} (490/sq mi)
- Time zone: UTC+1 (CET)
  - Summer (DST): UTC+2 (CEST)
- Postal code: 6745
- Dialing code: 0318

De Klomp is a village in the municipality of Ede, with a railway station called "Veenendaal-De Klomp railway station". It is located in the Dutch province of Gelderland.

It was first mentioned in 1787 as De Klomp, and is a name of an inn. A settlement has known to exist since 1565 and mainly concentrated along the road. After World War II, industry started to settle in the village.

== Gallery ==
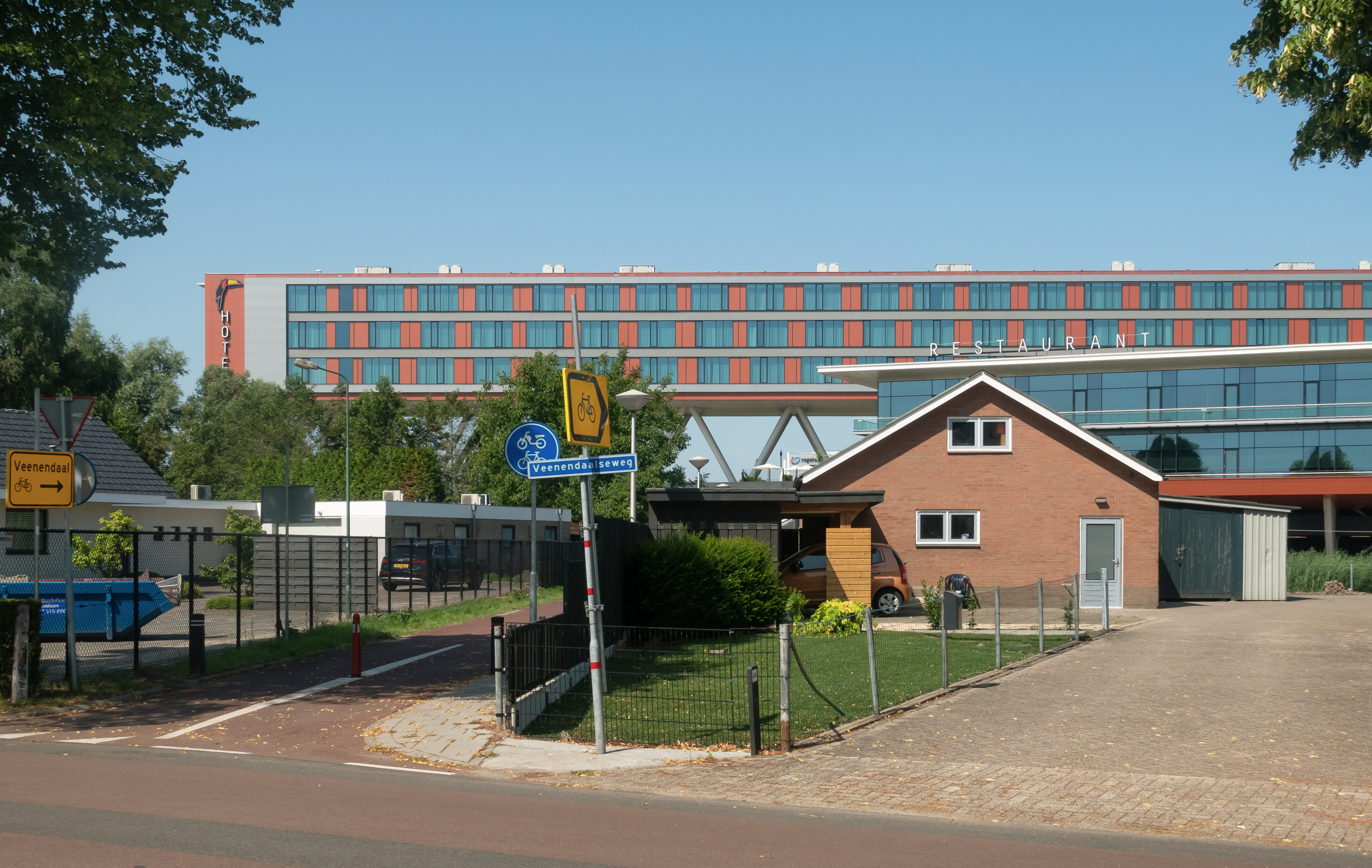
Hotel in De Klomp

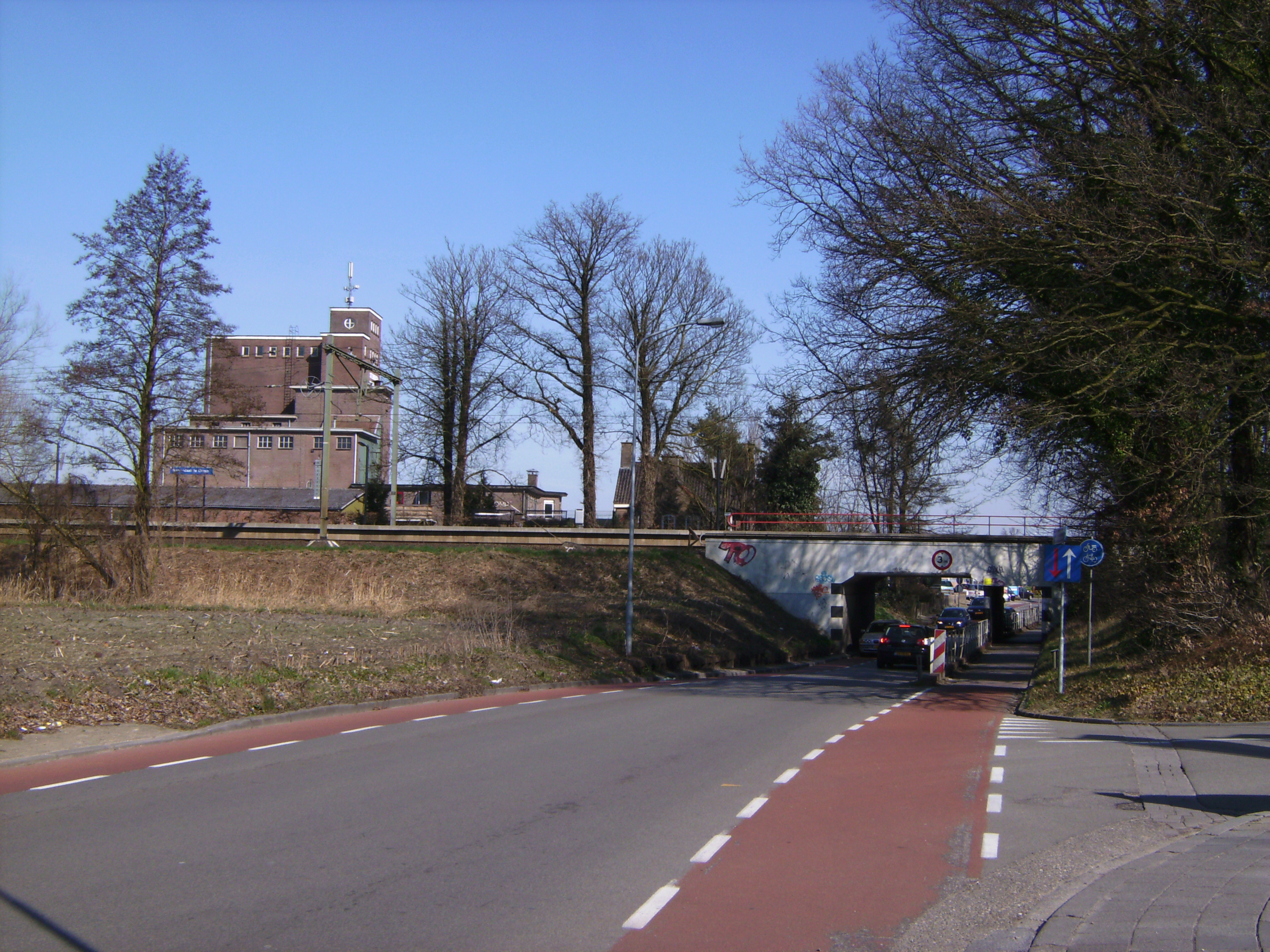
Underpass near the train station
