= It's All in the Game (game show) =

1985 Dutch television game show

- Genre: Game show
- Directed by: René Stokvis; John van de Rest; Fred Hilberdink
- Presented by: Hans Brian; Henk Mouwe
- Country of origin: Netherlands

Original release
- Network: Nederlandse Christelijke Radio Vereniging
- Release: 1985 – 1988

It's all in the game is a Dutch television game show for students of the NCRV which ran from 1985 till 1988. The show centered on home computer games. Several of the games were developed by Radarsoft.

In the show, two teams of high school students competed in different (educational) video games. The teams of high school students were accompanied by a Dutch celebrity guest. In some instances, contestants were made to use a home computer to create music, an animation or a drawing, which would then be judged on their quality by a jury panel. The show also contained a quiz, which did not involve any computer use. In 1987, the high school teams were replaced by teams consisting solely of celebrities.

== Presenters ==
- Hans Brian (1985–1987)
- Henk Mouwe (1987–1988)

== Commentator ==
- Herman Kuiphof (1986–1987)

== Directors ==
- René Stokvis (1985,1987)
- John van de Rest (1986)
- Fred Hilberdink (1988)
