= Deelen =

- Hamlet
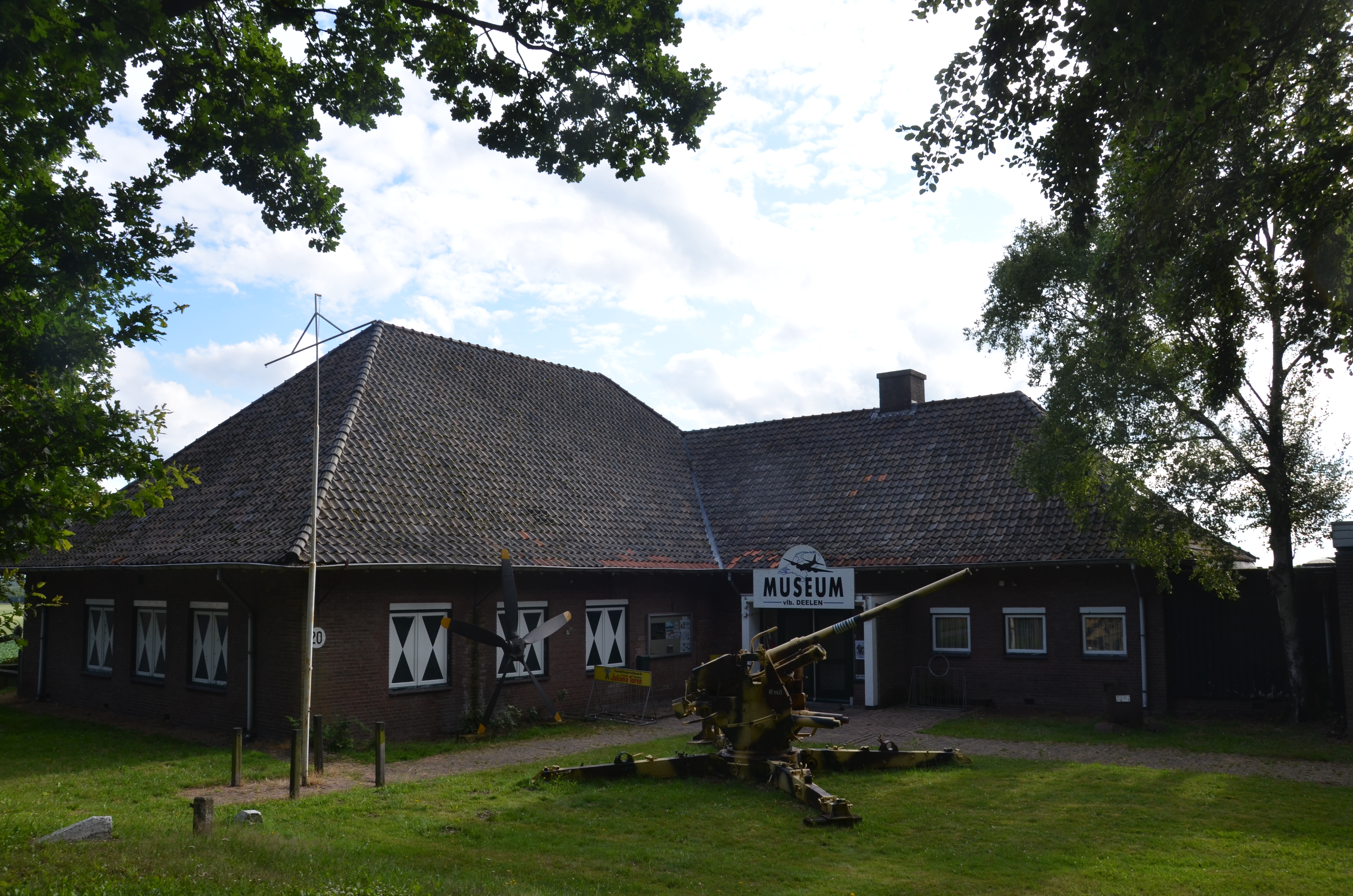
- Museum in Deelen

- Location in the Netherlands Deelen (Netherlands)
- Coordinates: 52°4′3″N 5°53′45″E
- Country: Netherlands
- Province: Gelderland
- Municipality: Ede; Arnhem

Area
  - Total: 29.75 km^{2} (11.49 sq mi)
- Elevation: 86 m (282 ft)

Population (2021)
  - Total: 40
  - Density: 1.3/km^{2} (3.5/sq mi)
- Time zone: UTC+1 (CET)
  - Summer (DST): UTC+2 (CEST)
- Postal code: 6877
- Dialing code: 026

Deelen is a hamlet in the Dutch province of Gelderland. It is largely in the municipality of Ede, Netherlands, but a small part lies in the municipality of Arnhem.

It was first mentioned in the 13th century as Deijle, and means "parcel of ground".

Deelen is best known for the Deelen Air Base, a military airfield close to the village. The airport was built in 1913 as a subsidiary of Soesterberg Air Base. During the German occupation, it was enlarged into a big airfield measuring 40 square kilometres (15 sq mi). There is a museum on the airbase dedicated to its history.

== Gallery ==
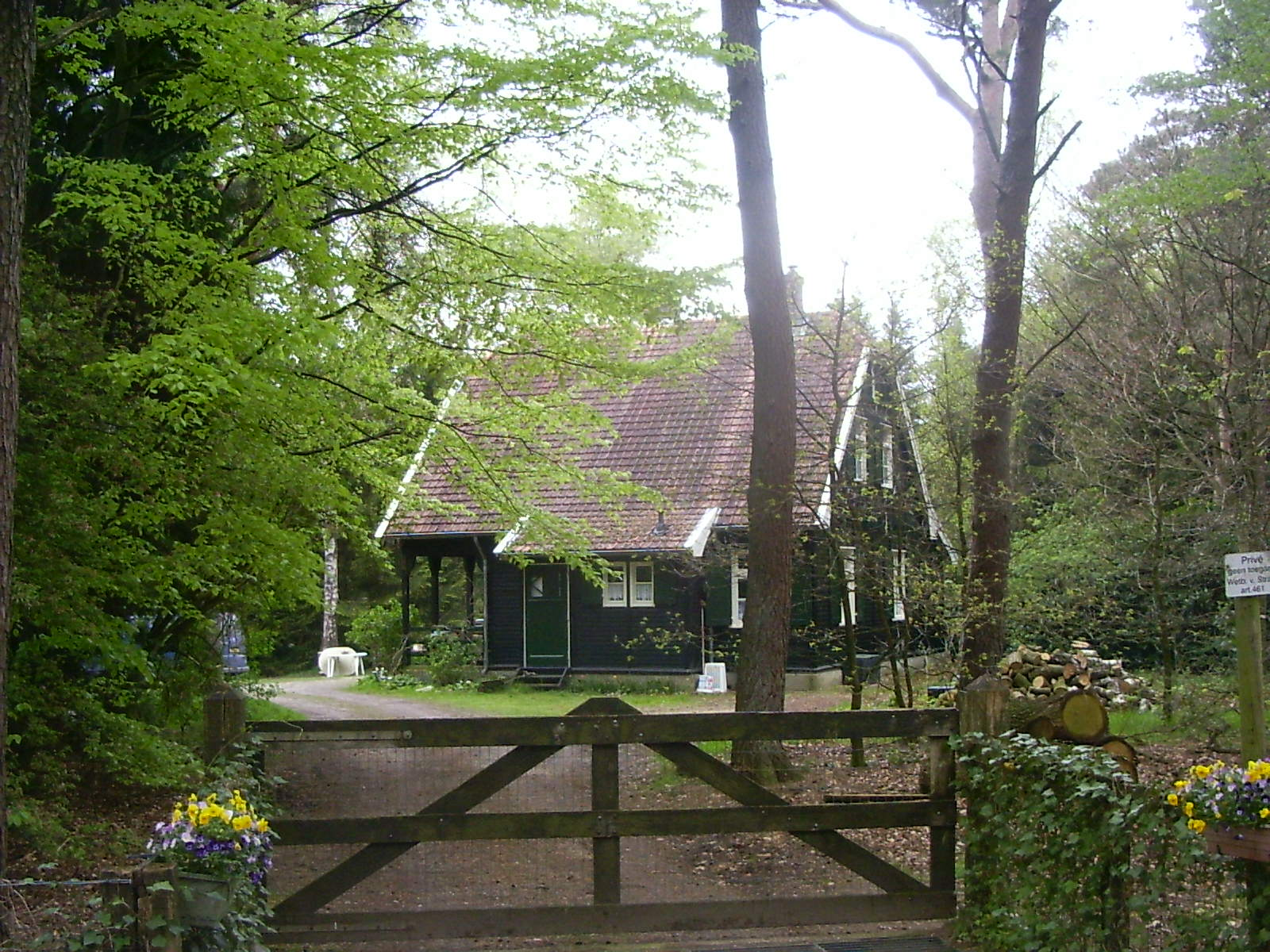
Farm in Deelen

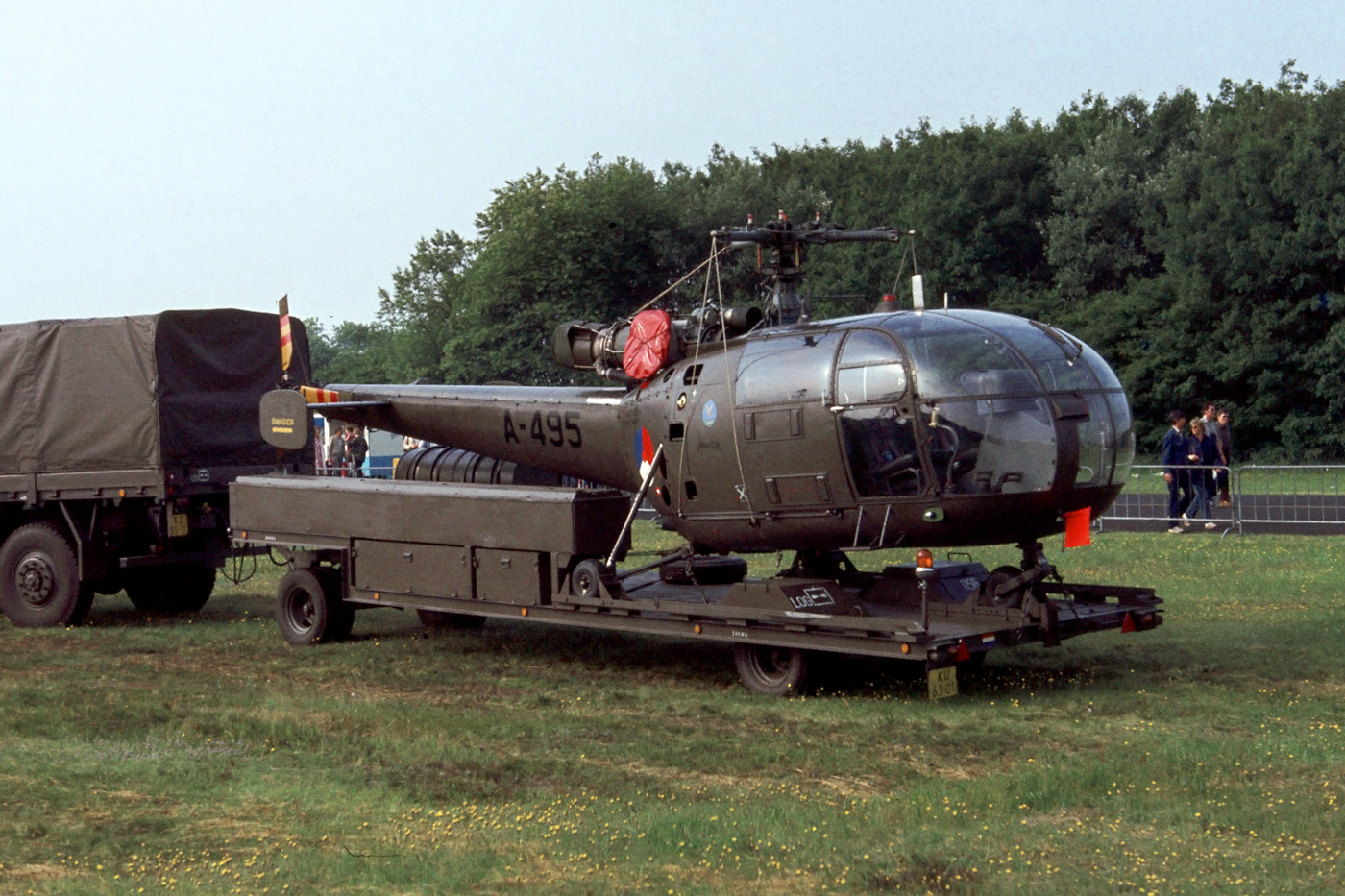
Alouette 3 at Deelen Air Base
