= Ede, Netherlands =

Ede
- Town and municipality
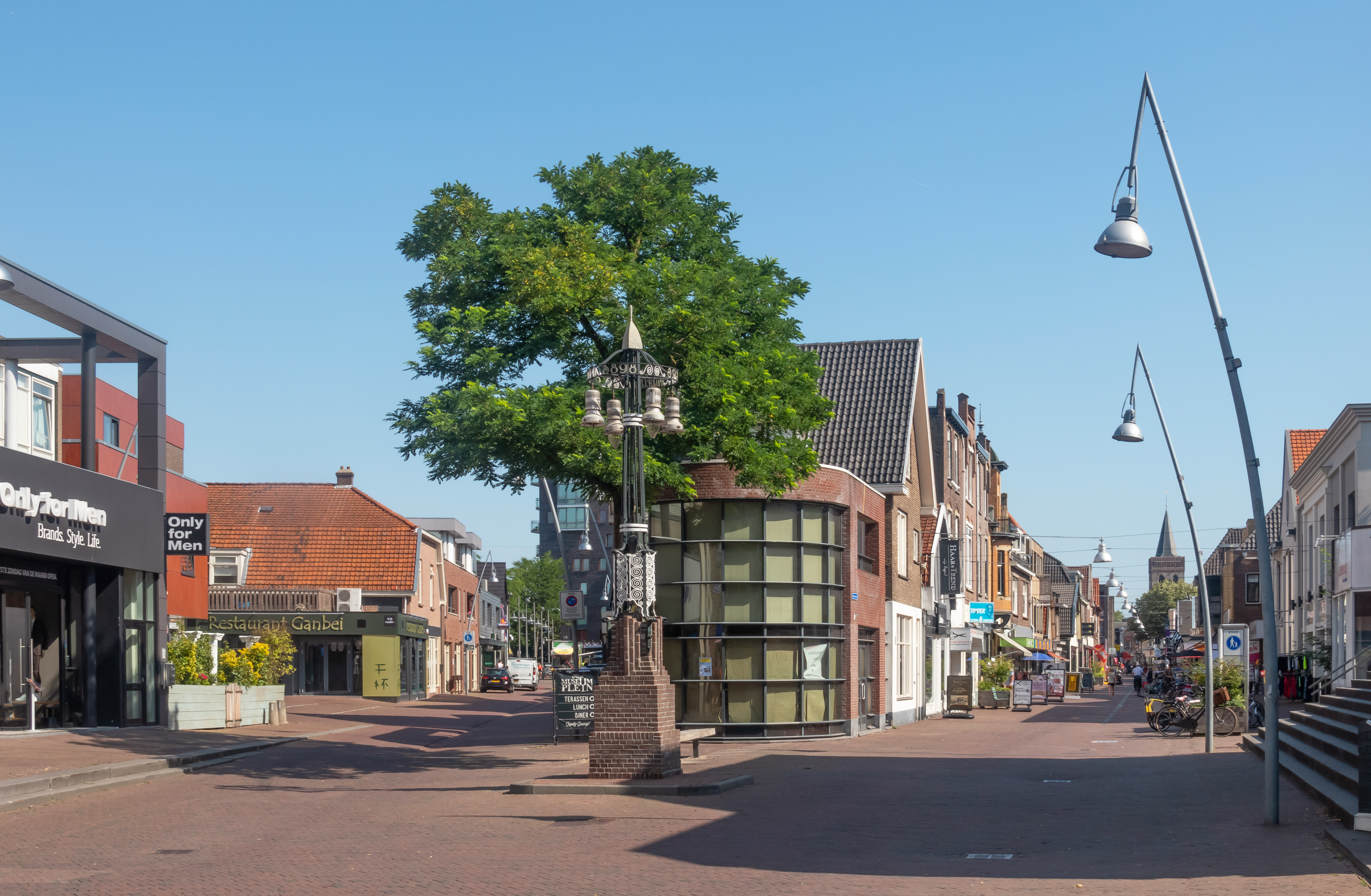
- Maanderplein with monumental lantern

- Flag Coat of arms

- Location in Gelderland

- Location within the Netherlands Location within Europe
- Coordinates: 52°3′N 5°40′E
- Country: Netherlands
- Province: Gelderland

Government
  - Body: Municipal council
  - Mayor: René Verhulst (CDA)

Area
  - Total: 318.62 km^{2} (123.02 sq mi)
  - Land: 318.18 km^{2} (122.85 sq mi)
  - Water: 0.44 km^{2} (0.17 sq mi)
- Elevation: 30 m (98 ft)

Population (January 2021)
  - Total: 118,530
  - Density: 373/km^{2} (970/sq mi)
- Demonym: Edenaar
- Time zone: UTC+1 (CET)
  - Summer (DST): UTC+2 (CEST)
- Postcode: 6710–6745, 6877
- Area code: 0318
- Website: www.ede.nl

Ede (Dutch pronunciation: [ˈeːdə]) is a city and municipality in the Netherlands, in the province of Gelderland. As of 22 November 2024, municipality had 123,532 inhabitants, and as of 1 January 2023 the city had 79,435 inhabitants.

== Population centres ==
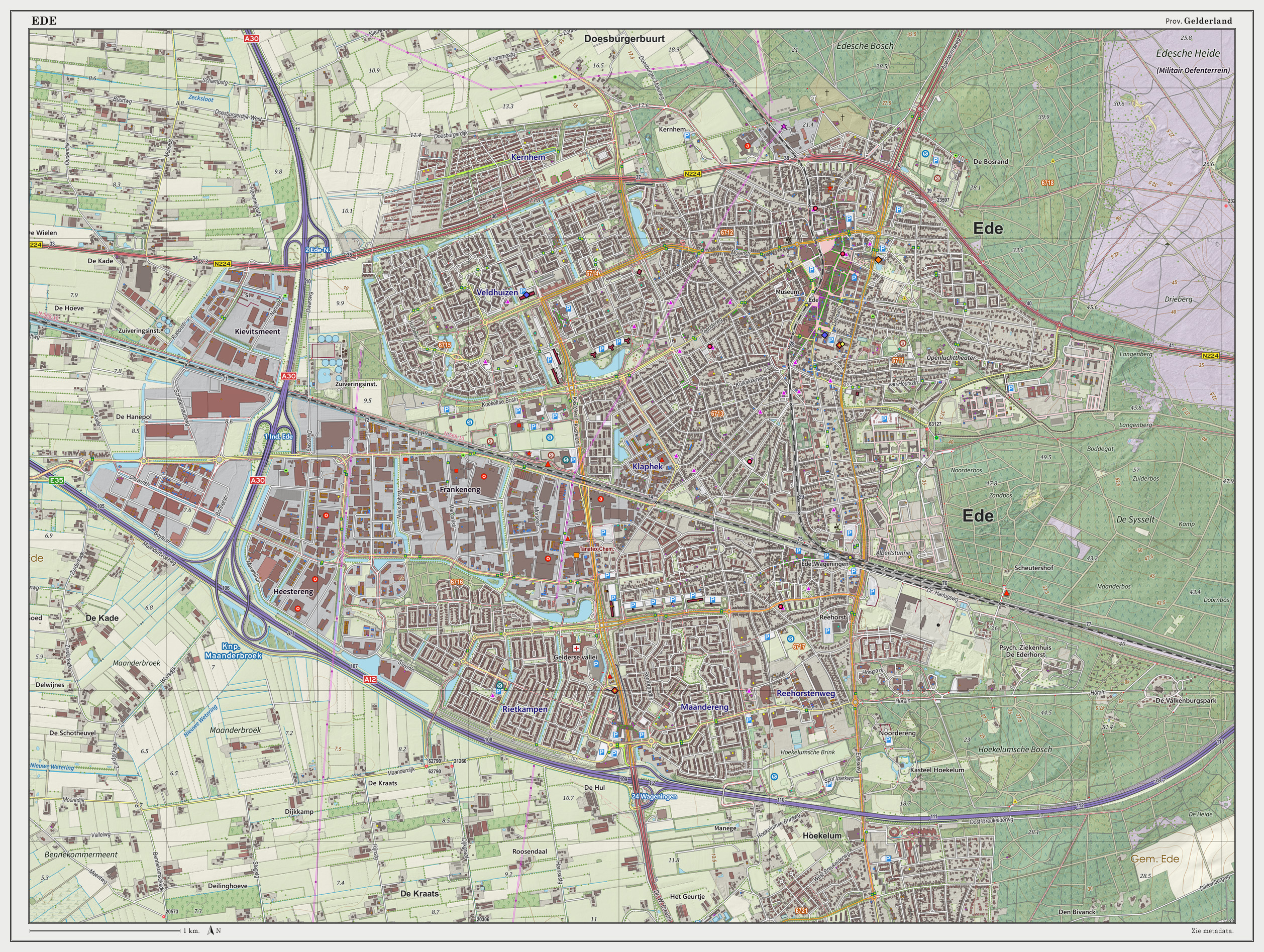
Dutch topographic map of Ede (town), March 2014

Community:

- Ede (town)
- Bennekom
- De Klomp
- Deelen
- Ederveen
- Harskamp
- Hoenderloo
- Lunteren
- Otterlo (Kröller-Müller Museum)
- Wekerom

== Location ==
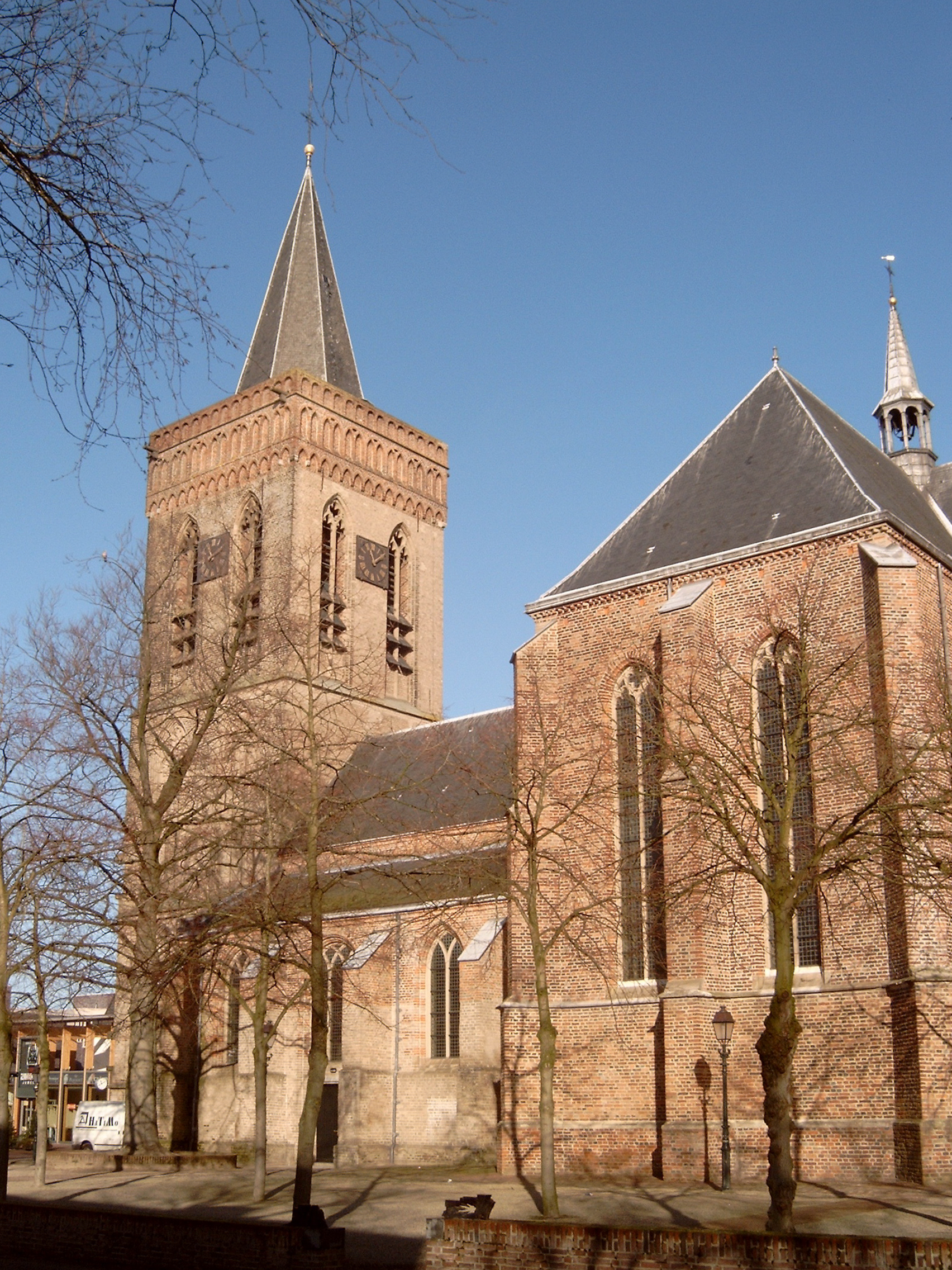
Ede, 'Oude Kerk'

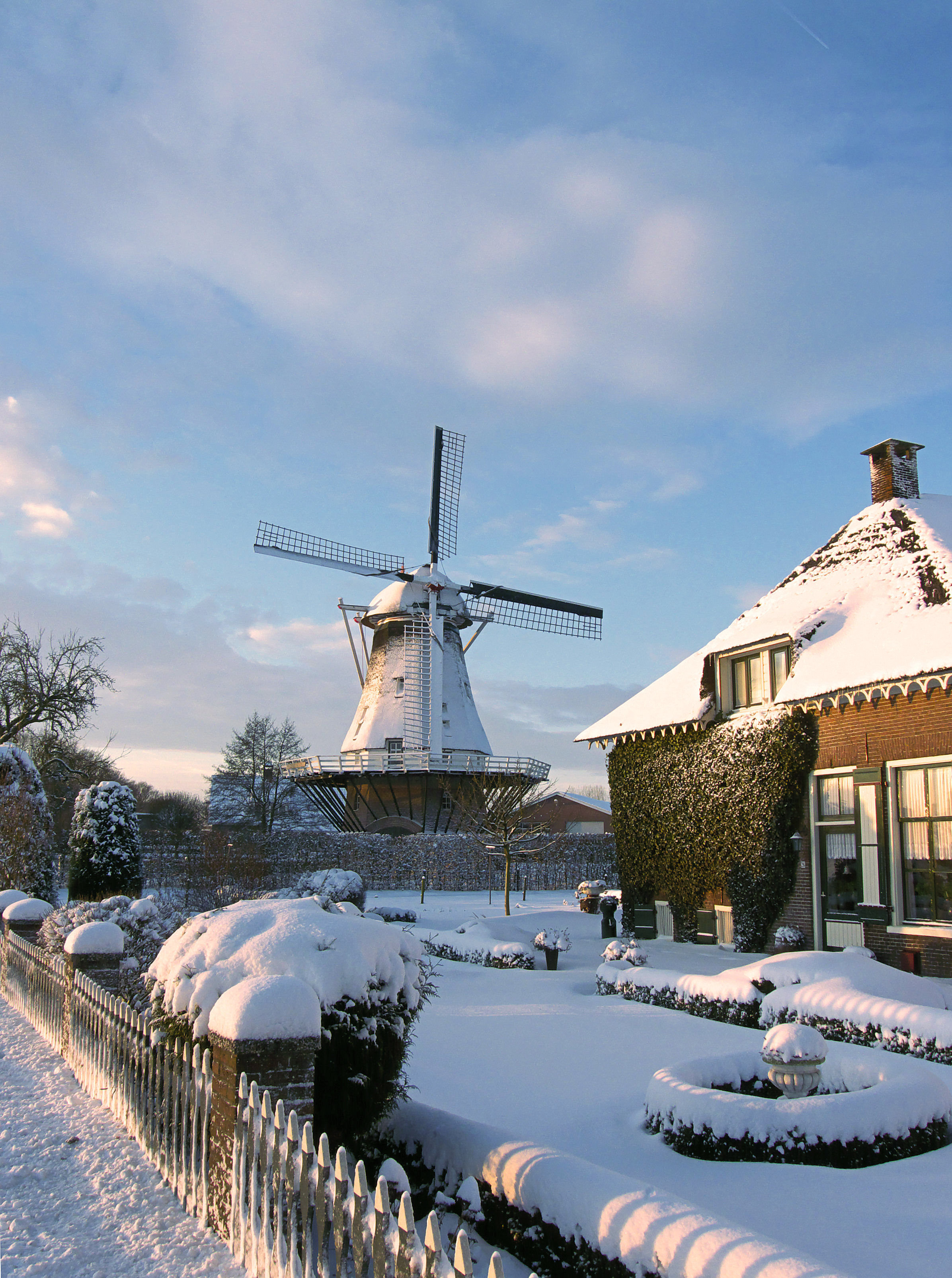
Walderveen Windmill

The town itself is situated halfway between the larger cities of Arnhem and Utrecht, with direct rail and road connections to both cities. There are no connections to any water nearby; however, there also is a direct road connection to the city of Wageningen which hosts a small industrial port on the river Rijn and a direct road and rail connection to the city of Arnhem, which features a larger port at a greater distance. The environment is clean and green because Ede is partly built in a forest and partly on the central Dutch plains in the national park called Nationaal Park "De Hoge Veluwe".

== Economy ==
Economically, the town of Ede is doing fairly well thanks to the proximity of major highways and railways which offer fast connections to the port of Rotterdam, Schiphol airport and the Ruhr Area in Germany. Ede is also part of the Rhine-Waal Euroregion. The main sources of employment used to be a factory belonging to the Dutch Enka company and the three military bases situated in the east of the town. The factory, however, has been closed and the military bases are largely underused since conscription was abolished. The town's economy is lately becoming more focused on national tourism from the more densely populated western cities like Amsterdam and The Hague, and on education such as local colleges and the large Wageningen University in the city of Wageningen.

Some of the more notable or larger companies and other employers in and around Ede are:

- Fruit juice and drinks-factory Riedel (juices and fruit drinks).
- Plant and flower auction house Plantion (since 1 March 2010).
- Advertising agency Lukkien who developed their own heliport on the roof of their office.
- The Dutch headquarters for Kimberly-Clark.
- The Dutch headquarters of mattress and pillow manufacturer Tempur-Pedic.
- Deli-XL, a foodservice distributor in Belgium and the Netherlands.
- The head office and two of the main datacentres of independent internet provider BIT.
- The world headquarters of organ manufacturer Johannus Orgelbouw and the Global Organ Group.

=== Transportation ===
Ede is situated along the A12 motorway and has a direct link to the A1 via the A30.

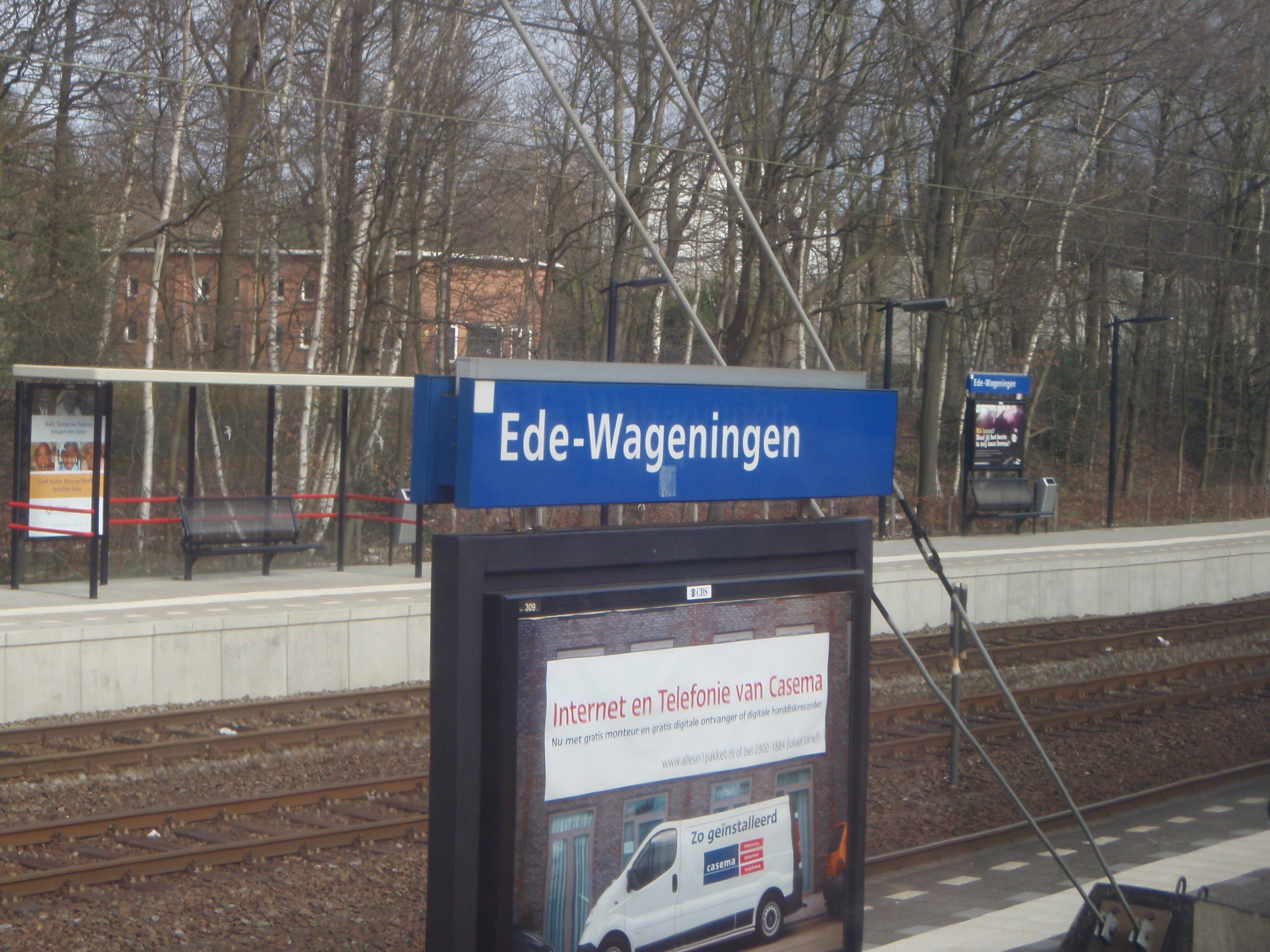
Ede-Wageningen railway station

There are two railway stations in Ede: Ede-Wageningen railway station and Ede Centrum railway station. Ede-Wageningen is the main station with services to Alkmaar, Amersfoort, Amsterdam, Amsterdam Airport Schiphol, Arnhem, Barneveld, Den Helder and Utrecht.

Ede Centrum is served by trains from Amersfoort and Barneveld to Ede-Wageningen.

=== Education ===
There are four secondary schools in Ede: Marnix College, Pallas Athene College, two divisions of Het Streek, and Aeres VMBO. In addition, Ede has a university of applied sciences, the Christian University of Applied Sciences Ede (Christelijke Hogeschool Ede).

Recently, a primary college focused on the equivalent of basic education named Technova College (formerly known as ROC A12) has been gaining interest and popularity since renovations started in 2015.

=== Social life ===
Each year, in the last week of August, there is a municipality-wide celebration called Heideweek (Week of the heather). It largely involves traditional Dutch festivities, along with local customs. During the week, a Queen of the heather and a Princess of the heather are elected from several candidates and will be the representative for the municipality of Ede on various other festivities, until next year when a new queen and princess are elected.

== Notable residents ==
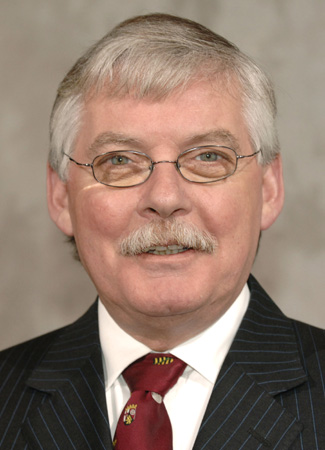
Cees van der Knaap, 2007

- Arthur F.E. van Schendel (1910–1979) a Dutch art historian and museum director
- Bert de Vries (born 1938) a retired Dutch politician and economist; lives in Bennekom
- Hans Dorrestijn (born 1940), writer and comedian
- Roel Robbertsen (born 1948) a Dutch politician and pig farmer, Mayor of Ede 2002 to 2007
- Cees van der Knaap (born 1951) a Dutch politician; Mayor of Ede 2008 to 2017
- Hans L. Bodlaender (born 1960) a Dutch computer scientist and academic
- Flora Lagerwerf-Vergunst (born 1964) a Dutch judge and former politician and educator
- Tamara Bos (born 1967) a Dutch screenwriter
- Ghislaine Pierie (born 1969), actress, film director, and stage director.
- Marianne Thieme (born 1972), politician, author and animal rights activist
- Arend Kisteman (born 1984), Dutch politician

=== Sport ===
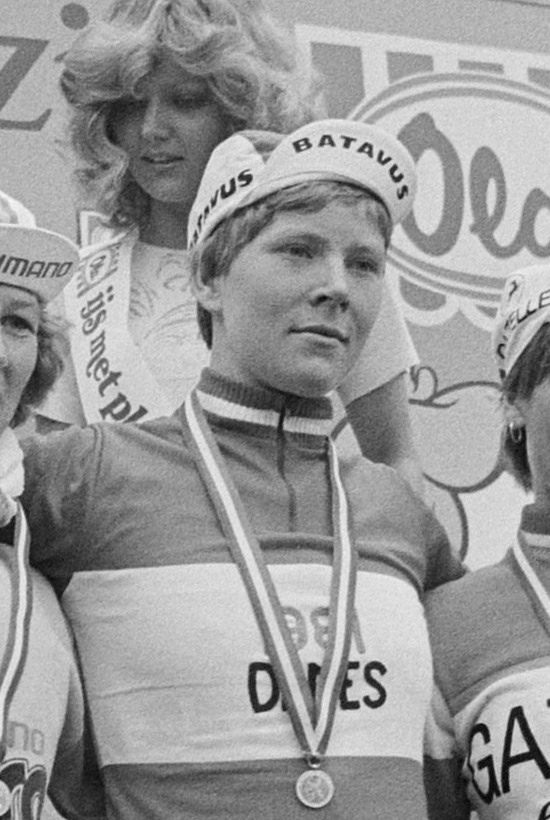
Hennie Top, 1981

- Dick Schoenaker (born 1952), a retired football midfielder with about 430 club caps
- Hennie Top (born 1956) a former professional cyclist, competed at the 1984 Summer Olympics
- John Scherrenburg (born 1963), a retired water polo player, competed at the 1992 Summer Olympics
- Angela Postma (born 1971), a former freestyle swimmer, competed at the 1996 Summer Olympics
- Sonja Tol (born 1972), a Dutch épée fencer, competed at the 2004 Summer Olympics
- Benno Kuipers (born 1974), a former breaststroke swimmer, 18 times Dutch Champion
- Jaap van Lagen (born 1976) a Dutch racing driver
- Esmeral Tunçluer (born 1980), a Dutch-Turkish former basketball player
- Diederik van Silfhout (born 1988) a dressage rider, competed at the 2016 Summer Olympics
- Bibiane Schoofs (born 1988), a Dutch professional tennis player; lives in Ede
- Ruben Knab (born 1988) a Dutch rower, competed at the 2012 Summer Olympics
- Jenson Seelt (born 2003), a professional footballer who plays for Sunderland AFC

== Gallery ==
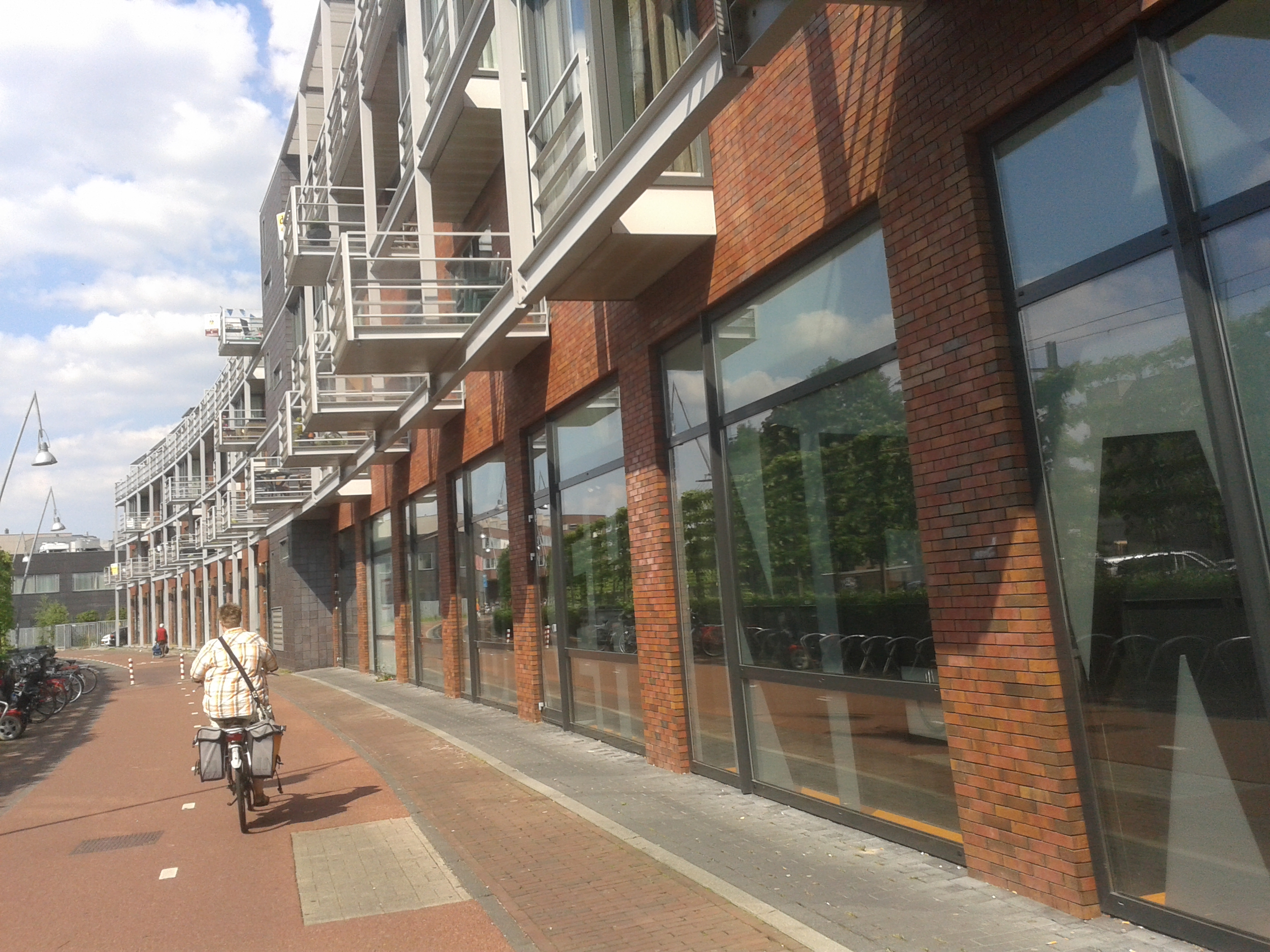

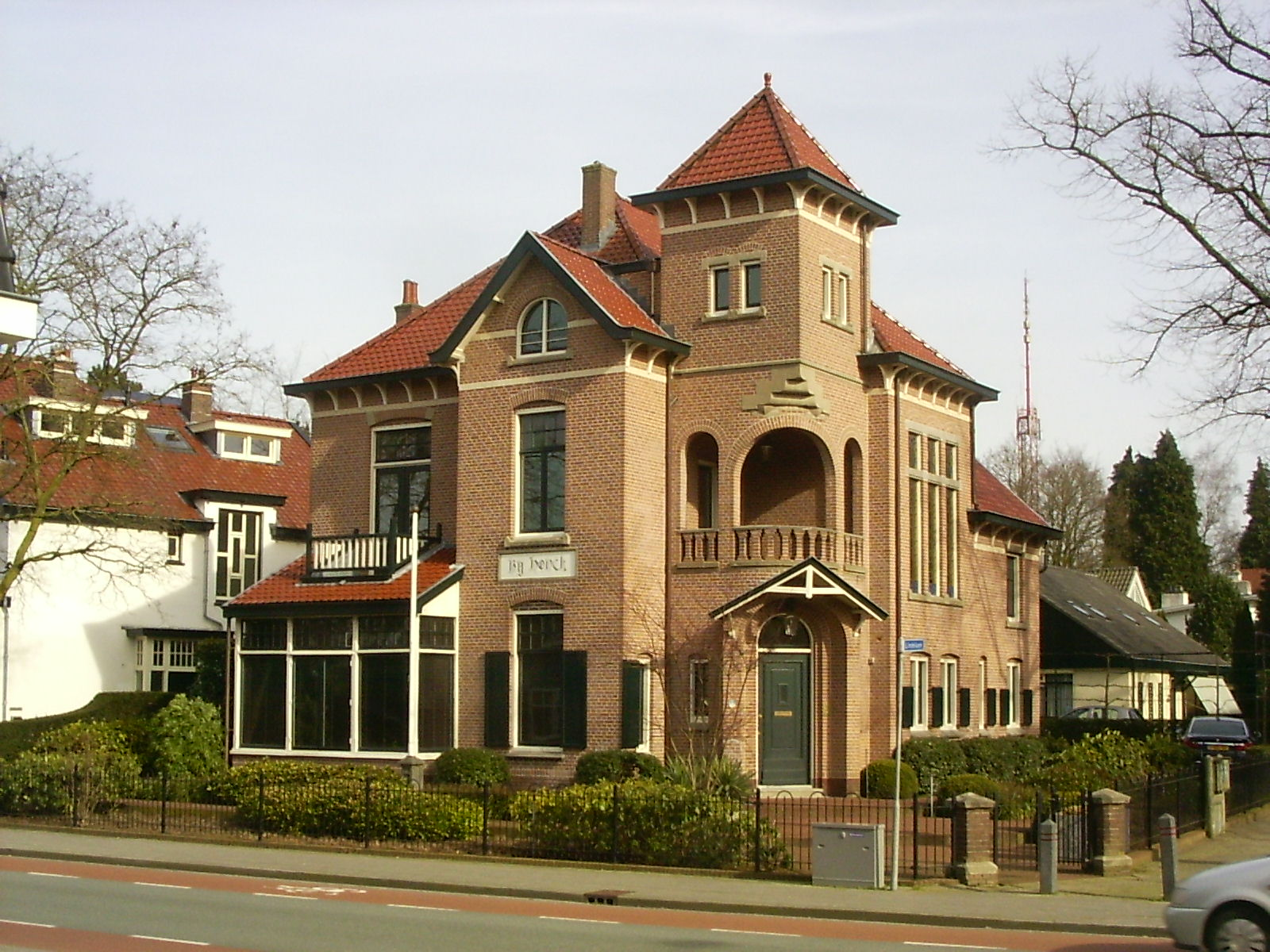

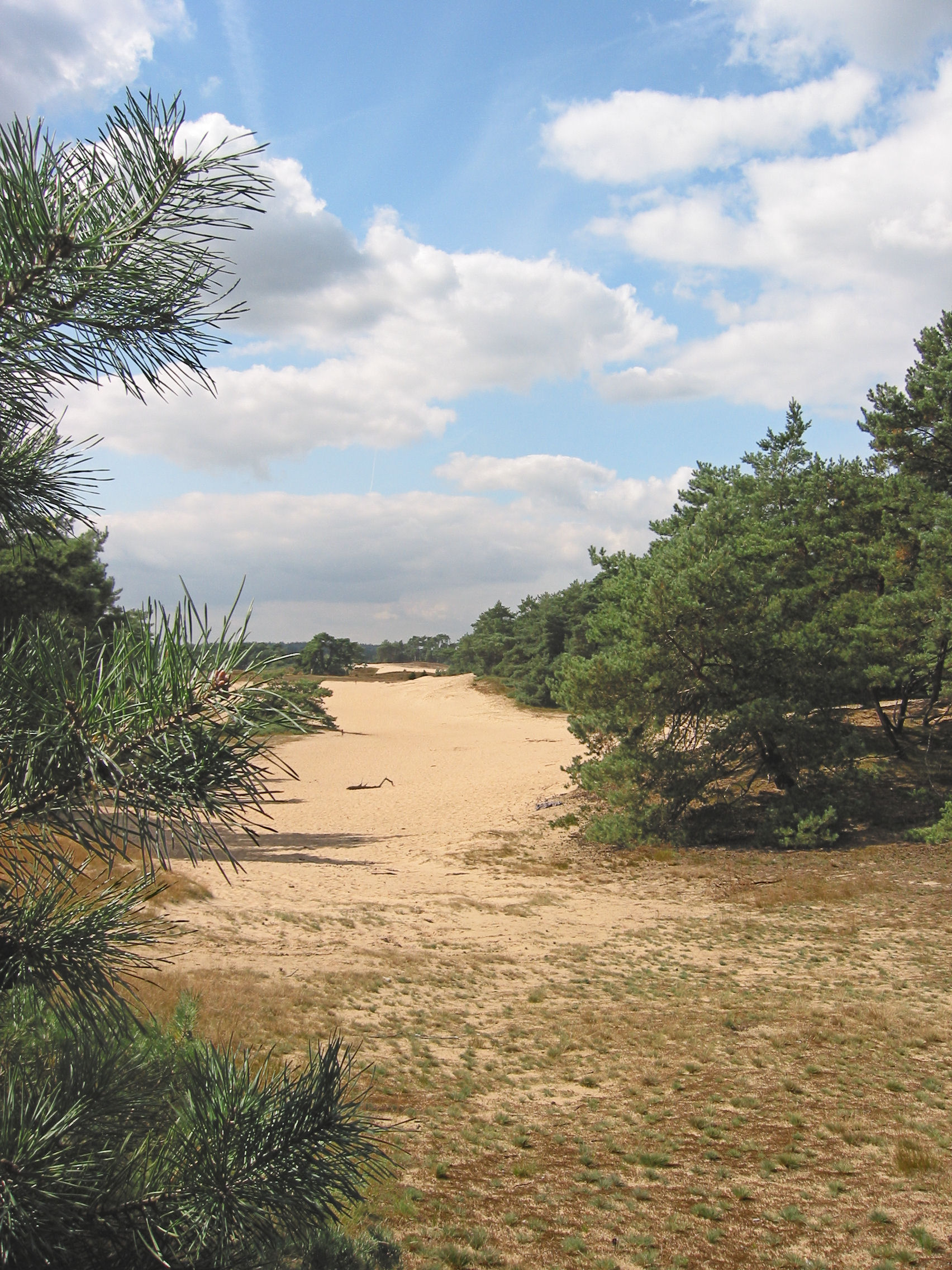

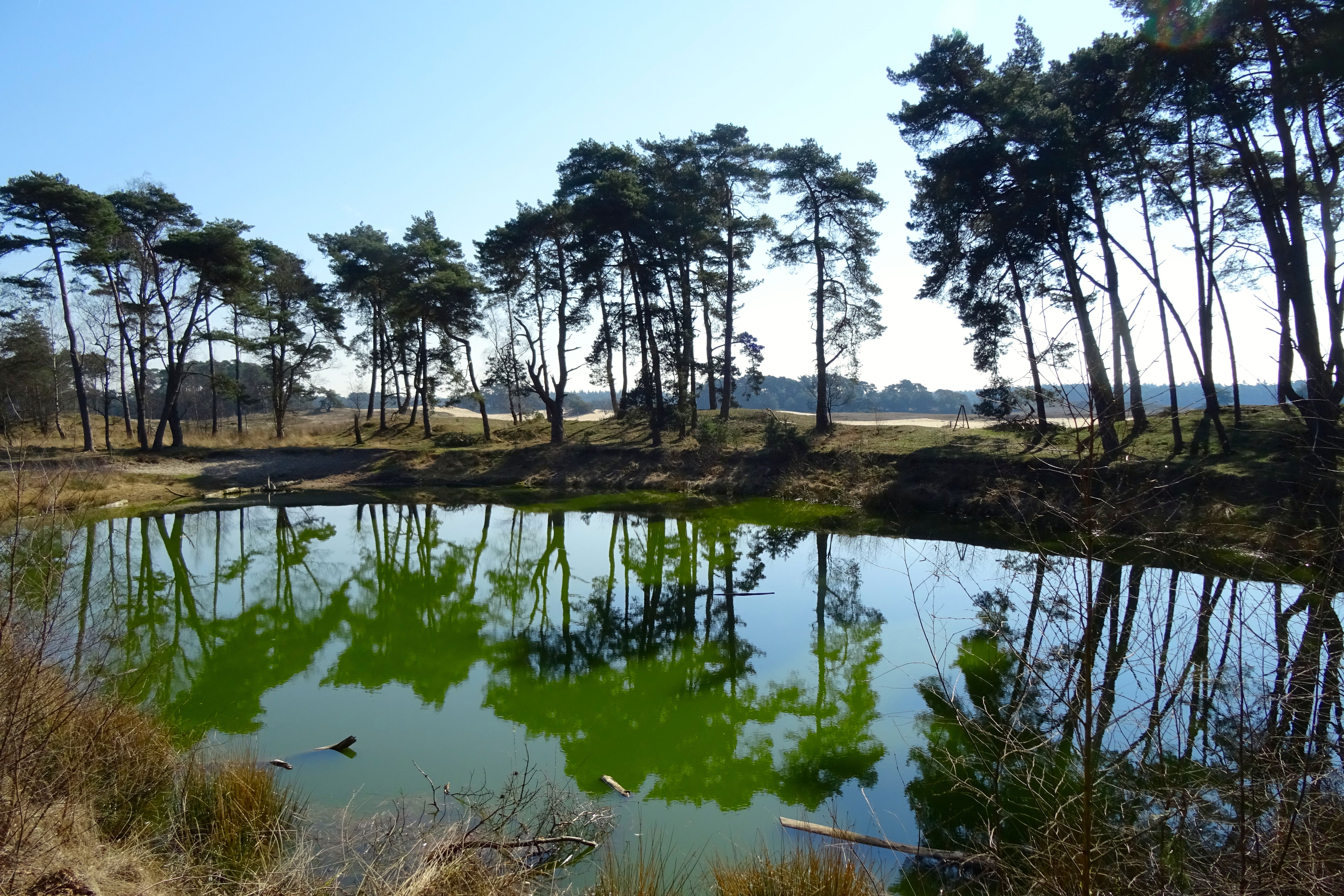

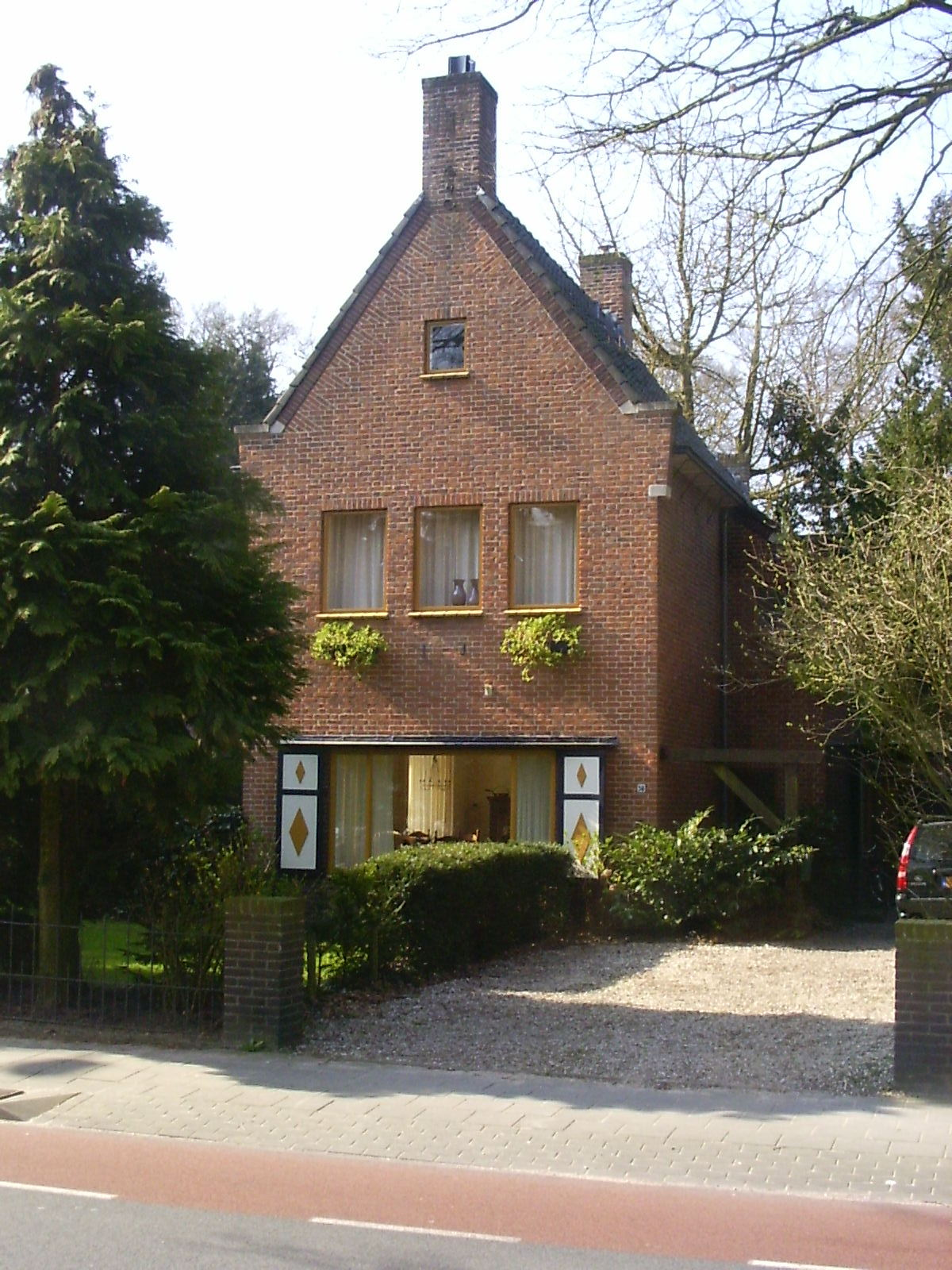

== Climate ==
Climate data for Deelen, Ede (1991−2020 normals, extremes 1953−present)
Month	Jan	Feb	Mar	Apr	May	Jun	Jul	Aug	Sep	Oct	Nov	Dec	Year
Record high °C (°F)	14.5 (58.1)	19.5 (67.1)	24.6 (76.3)	29.4 (84.9)	31.9 (89.4)	34.2 (93.6)	39.2 (102.6)	37.2 (99.0)	32.7 (90.9)	26.4 (79.5)	19.5 (67.1)	15.2 (59.4)	39.2 (102.6)
Mean daily maximum °C (°F)	5.4 (41.7)	6.5 (43.7)	10.3 (50.5)	14.9 (58.8)	18.6 (65.5)	21.3 (70.3)	23.4 (74.1)	23.0 (73.4)	19.4 (66.9)	14.5 (58.1)	9.3 (48.7)	6.0 (42.8)	14.4 (57.9)
Daily mean °C (°F)	2.9 (37.2)	3.2 (37.8)	5.9 (42.6)	9.6 (49.3)	13.3 (55.9)	16.1 (61.0)	18.1 (64.6)	17.7 (63.9)	14.5 (58.1)	10.5 (50.9)	6.4 (43.5)	3.5 (38.3)	10.1 (50.2)
Mean daily minimum °C (°F)	0.0 (32.0)	-0.0 (32.0)	1.6 (34.9)	3.8 (38.8)	7.5 (45.5)	10.4 (50.7)	12.6 (54.7)	12.3 (54.1)	9.8 (49.6)	6.6 (43.9)	3.3 (37.9)	0.9 (33.6)	5.7 (42.3)
Record low °C (°F)	−24.2 (−11.6)	−23.2 (−9.8)	−17.0 (1.4)	−9.4 (15.1)	−4.5 (23.9)	−0.9 (30.4)	2.0 (35.6)	2.4 (36.3)	−0.9 (30.4)	−6.5 (20.3)	−9.9 (14.2)	−18.4 (−1.1)	−24.2 (−11.6)
Average precipitation mm (inches)	79.5 (3.13)	63.7 (2.51)	60.7 (2.39)	43.8 (1.72)	62.9 (2.48)	69.1 (2.72)	86.5 (3.41)	83.9 (3.30)	73.8 (2.91)	73.3 (2.89)	79.5 (3.13)	91.3 (3.59)	868.0 (34.17)
Average relative humidity (%)	88.8	85.5	80.0	72.8	72.5	74.5	75.7	77.5	82.5	86.6	90.9	90.8	81.5
Mean monthly sunshine hours	62.7	86.7	135.8	181.6	205.1	196.2	203.2	188.3	148.7	115.9	66.7	53.5	1,644.4
Percentage possible sunshine	24.2	30.8	36.8	43.6	42.2	39.3	40.4	41.4	39.0	35.0	25.0	22.0	35.0
Source: Royal Netherlands Meteorological Institute
