= John van de Rest =

Dutch film director and screenwriter (1940–2022)

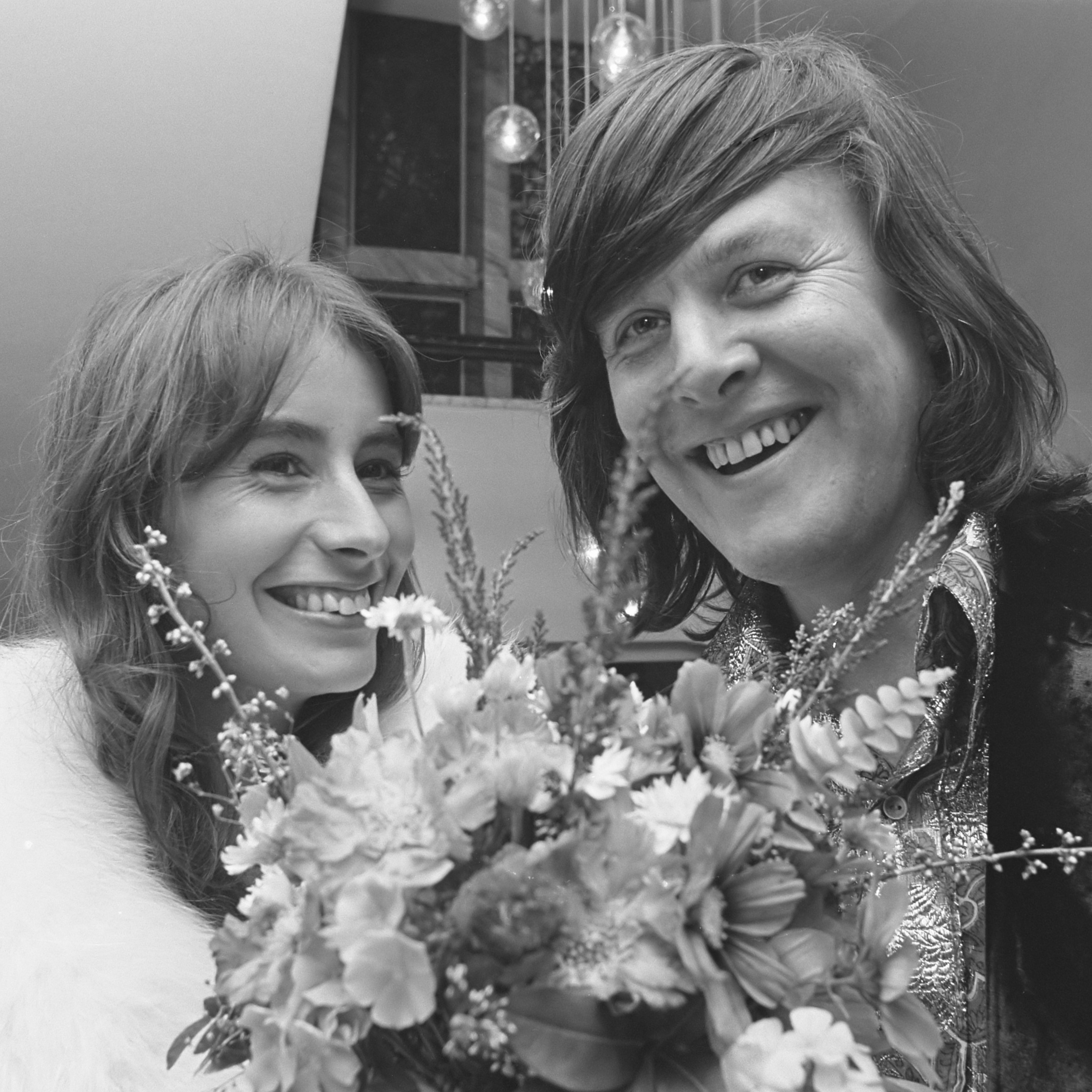
- Van de Rest (right) with wife Josine van Dalsum in 1974
- Born: 19 March 1940; Vlissingen, Netherlands
- Died: 6 April 2022 (aged 82); Laren, North Holland, Netherlands
- Occupations: Film director Screenwriter

John van de Rest (19 March 1940 – 6 April 2022) was a Dutch film director and screenwriter.

== Filmography ==
- Citroentje met suiker (1972–1974)
- Waaldrecht (1973)
- L'Homme d'Amsterdam (1976)
- Laat maar zitten (1988–1991)

== Personal life ==
Van de Rest was married to actress Josine van Dalsum from 1974 until her death in 2009. The couple had a son, Aram van de Rest. John van de Rest died in Laren, North Holland on 6 April 2022 at the age of 82.
