= SpangaS =

Dutch television series

SpangaS (also known as SpangaS: De Campus) is a Dutch youth series, created by Anya Koek for the NCRV.

The television series revolved around the lives of a group of students at Spangalis College. Episodes revolved around a wide range of student activities and personal drama during secondary education. The program was similar in format and subject matter to the Canadian series DeGrassi but with a more lighthearted feel aimed towards tweenagers and younger teens.

A SpangaS movie, SpangaS op Survival, premiered on September 30, 2009. The plot focuses on the students' trip to the Belgian Ardennes. A stand-alone sequel, SpangaS in Actie, was released in 2015.

A SpangaS theater show, SpangaS Live!, ran from April to June 2011.

In 2020, the school was replaced by "De Campus", where students slept during weekdays.

On March 14, 2022 it was announced that the series will be cancelled after a fifteen-year-run. The last episode was broadcast on April 28.

== Story ==
Every student has their own individual storylines. These usually involve events in their school lives, but occasionally their home lives as well. The show deals with various topics relevant to secondary school students and the viewing audience: love, friendship, death, loneliness, sadness, school, teacher/teachers, parents, divorce, finding a sense of belonging, bullying, discrimination, and future dreams. SpangaS also covers LGBTQ topics considered taboo to cover in past series aimed at children. Past episodes have had students coming to terms with their orientations, like Flip struggling with his sexuality and love for Mick and later Koen, both boys in his class. Later seasons also introduced transgender and non-binary characters.

The public broadcasting was satisfied with the number of viewers that SpangaS drew in the first season. In the Viewers group 9 to 12 years, the series gained a 20% market share. At the end of the season, the market share grew to 45%. On February 20, 2008, the NRC newspaper reported an average of 200,000 viewers. 52 episodes from the first season sold to the German Super RTL, where the series is called SpangaS - Das ist das Leben. A Swiss version of SpangaS has also been made with a full Swiss cast. The location scenes are filmed in Switzerland and the scenes in and around the school in Amsterdam. Starting in September 2010, SpangaS was broadcast at 19:00, replacing the soap opera ONM and aimed towards an older targeted audience. Episodes were rerun during the daytime youth timeslot. The series later moved to 18:00 and was in its final two seasons aired four times a week instead of five.

== Intro ==
The intro of SpangaS for all seasons features an original theme song. The original intro shows the teachers first, followed by two portraits of the students. This changed in Season 7 when the order switched. The theme song was replaced by a short tune in season 14.

== Cast (2019-2020) ==
Main characters
| Actor | Character | Period |
| Joe Sinduhije | Jip Baltus | 5 September 2016 – present |
| Iris van Loen | Maud Overmars | 5 September 2016 – present |
| Bruno Prent | Dylan King | 5 September 2016 – present |
| Yeliz Dogan | Filiz Kara | 4 September 2017 – present |
| Tobias Oelderik | Otis Marchand | 4 September 2017 – present |
| Renée de Gruijl | Elza van Waveren | 3 September 2018 – present |
| Claudia Kanne | Jackie Oleander | 3 September 2018 – present |
| Giorgio Sanches | Mo Duurfort | 3 September 2018 – present |
| Jard Struik | Joris Poppink | 8 June 2019 – present |
| Roosmarijn Wind | Luna van Velzen | 2 September 2019 – present |
Staff members
| Steef Hupkes | Jochem Damstra | 3 September 2007 – present |
| Felix Burleson | Aldert Patron Kalkhoven | 3 September 2007 – present |
| Judy Doorman | Madge Jansen; Miss Madge | 17 September 2008 – present |
| Mike Reus | Wilhelm van Tiel | 7 September 2018 – present |
| Imanuelle Grives | Ishana Vrijland | 27 September 2018 – present |
| Marcel Harteveld | Henri de Ruiter | 19 October 2018 – present |
| Bo Maerten | Sophie Bleeker | 2 September 2019 – present |
Supporting roles:
| Actor | Character | Period |
| Robbert Rodenburg | Leroy | 3 September 2018 – present |
| Paul vd Berg | Brandweerman Sam | |

== SpangaS specials ==
=== SpangaS: Nablijven! ===
SpangaS: Nablijven! was a special miniseries with 10 episodes aired over 2 weeks, revealing secret information about the school. Every episode had individual focus on one student. The spin-off displayed secrets and additional character information about the students with flashbacks from previous episodes and previews of new episodes of the remainder of the main series' season. This series was aired on December 8, 2008 to December 19, 2008. These episodes are not on the DVD of the second season of SpangaS.

=== SpangaS: Leergeld ===
Spangas: Leergeld is a special educational series of five short episodes about personal finance. To celebrate the fiftieth anniversary of the concierge Aldert, the children collected money. To their horror, they lost the money. SpangaS: Leergeld was broadcast from September 13, 2010 to October 11, 2010, every Monday from 10:30 to 10:40am on Nederland 3 during the SchoolTV block. The series was repeated on May 26, 2011 t/m June 30, 2011 every Thursday at 10.50 on NL3.

This series, which was commissioned by Teleac SchoolTV, was jointly produced by NL Film, TVBV and NCRV. The Nibud and the Platform Guide in finance were also involved with production.

=== SpangaS: Mediawhizz ===
This educational miniseries had the students of the Spangalis College dealing with the pros and cons of the digital world and new media. The five special episodes aired on Zapp from May 28 to June 1, immediately after the end of season 5.

== Books ==
Eleven books based on the series have been published, written by Wendy Buenen and Ed van Eeden.

1. Fay (2008)
2. Flip en Tobias (2008)
3. Irmak (2008)
4. Luxor (2008)
5. Avalanche (2008)
6. Barry (2008)
7. Jole (2009)
8. Nassim (2009)
9. Lana (2009)
10. SpangaS op Survival filmeditie (2010)
11. SpangaS ZomerBoek (2011)

There are also 17 magazines published so far.

== SpangaS the Game ==
In this online games, kids can explore the Spangalis College and interact with their favorite characters, helping them with various problems. Players can walk around the school and visit areas from the show like the canteen and the bike shed. The five levels discuss various topics tying into themes discussed in the show, including love, bullying, the environment, appearance, and partying.

By performing various tasks with the help of the SpangaS characters, players earn points and win prizes. Each level features mini-games that also be played after completion of the levels. On top of completing the levels, players can also earn achievement medals during the minigames. Episodes of SpangaS and the SpangaS newsletter also gave away secret codes for extras that players could earn in-game.

== Awards ==
- 2008: The Gouden Stuiver for Best Youth Program 2008
- 2008: The Beeld en Geluid Award 2008 in the Multimedia category
- 2009: The Gouden @penstaart in the Websites category for kids
- 2009: SpangaS was nominated for the Gouden Roos in the Drama category, a prestigious international TV award
- 2009: The Gouden Film for over 100,000 filmgoers seeing SpangaS Op Survival
- 2009: The Nieuwe Media Award, a publicly voted award from Cinekid
- 2010: The Kinderkastprijs, a publicly voted from Cinekid
- 2011: The Altijd anders Prize (Mediasmarties)
