= It's All in the Game (Eric Alexander album) =

Studio album by Eric Alexander
- Released: March 14, 2006
- Recorded: July 29, 2005
- Studio: Van Gelder Studio, Englewood Cliffs, NJ
- Genre: Jazz
- Length: 53:28
- Label: HighNote
- Producer: Todd Barkan

Eric Alexander chronology
| Sunday in New York (2005) | It's All in the Game (2006) | Temple of Olympic Zeus (2007) |

It's All in the Game is an album by tenor saxophonist Eric Alexander. It was recorded in 2005 and released by HighNote Records.

== Recording and music ==
The album was recorded at the Van Gelder Studio on July 29, 2005. It was produced by Todd Barkan. The quartet are tenor saxophonist Eric Alexander, pianist Harold Mabern, bassist Nat Reeves, and drummer Joe Farnsworth. Three of the tracks are Alexander originals: "Typhoon 11", "Open and Shut" (a minor blues), and "Little Lucas" (named for Alexander's son).

== Release and reception ==
Professional ratings
Review scores
| Source | Rating |
|---|---|
| AllMusic | 4/5 stars |

It's All in the Game was released by HighNote Records. The AllMusic reviewer concluded that "Eric Alexander is a clear winner with It's All in the Game."

== Track listing ==
All compositions by Eric Alexander except where noted

1. "Where or When" (Richard Rodgers, Lorenz Hart) – 7:05
2. "Typhoon 11" – 6:51
3. "Where Is the Love" (Ralph MacDonald, William Salter) – 6:30
4. "It's All in the Game" (Charles G. Dawes, Carl Sigman) – 5:51
5. "Open and Shut" – 8:27
6. "Ruby, My Dear" (Thelonious Monk) – 7:54
7. "Little Lucas" – 5:20
8. "Bye Bye Baby" – 5:30

== Personnel ==
- Eric Alexander – tenor saxophone
- Harold Mabern – piano
- Nat Reeves – bass
- Joe Farnsworth – drums
