= Nederlandse Christelijke Radio Vereniging =

Dutch public broadcaster

NCRV
- Type: Public broadcaster
- Country: Netherlands
- Availability: Netherlands
- Founded: 1924
- Dissolved: 2018
- Official website: www.ncrv.nl
- Replaced by: KRO-NCRV

NCRV (Nederlandse Christelijke Radio Vereniging) (English: Dutch Christian Radio Association) was a public radio and television broadcaster in the Netherlands, mostly transmitting on NPO 1 and NPO 2.

On 1 January 2014, NCRV merged with KRO to form KRO-NCRV.

== Notable people ==
- Mariska Hulscher, presenter

== Programmes ==
- Help, 1990s drama
- Hello Goodbye, 2005 ongoing reality television
- Zonder Ernst, 1990s sitcom
- It's All in the Game, 1980s game show
- Disney Club, programming block
- SpangaS (2007–2022)

== See also ==
- Television networks in the Netherlands
