= The Wallace Roney Quintet =

Studio album by Wallace Roney
- Released: 1996
- Recorded: February 20–22, 1995
- Studios: Power Station, New York City
- Genre: Jazz
- Length: 70:30
- Labels: Warner Bros. 9 45914
- Producer: Teo Macero

Wallace Roney chronology
Mistérios (1994)	The Wallace Roney Quintet (1996)	Village (1997)

The Wallace Roney Quintet is an album by American jazz trumpeter Wallace Roney, recorded in 1995 and released on the Warner Bros. label.

== Reception ==
Professional ratings
Review scores
Source	Rating
AllMusic	4/5 stars
Los Angeles Times	3/4 stars

The AllMusic review by Scott Yanow stated, "Wallace Roney began to break free of the frequent claim that he was overly imitating Miles Davis. ... the trumpeter encouraged his band to contribute pieces for this recording; the sideman are responsible for six of the ten pieces, and the performances indicate this is a true band and not just a showboat leader with a supporting cast".

In the Los Angeles Times Don Heckman wrote, "Roney’s recording, at first blush, appears to be a further extension of his reworking of the Davis approach of the ‘60s and ‘70s. But a closer listen reveals that Roney is doing a lot of reinventing of his own as well. ... the music has the kind of crisp, intuitive interplay that emerges too rarely in studio-only sessions. Roney is at the top of his form, urgently rushing from rapid-fire, cutting-edge segments to quiet, lyrical passages, continuously pushing and stretching to shape a familiar sound into his own distinctive expression. And the group ... seems as eager as Roney is to move jazz into the future without abandoning its connection with the past".

== Track listing ==
1. "Spyra" (Antoine Roney) – 7:45
2. "Astral Radium" (Carlos McKinney) – 6:12
3. "G.D.D." (Clarence Seay) – 7:39
4. "Night and Day" (Cole Porter) – 8:17
5. "Nightrance" (Carlos McKinney) – 4:40
6. "Ultra-Axis" (Antoine Roney) – 9:12
7. "Clowns" (Anthony Wonsey) – 6:59
8. "High Stakes" (Seay) – 4:51
9. "Geri" (Wallace Roney) – 9:03
10. "Northern Lights" (Wallace Roney) – 5:52

== Personnel ==
- Wallace Roney − trumpet
- Antoine Roney − tenor saxophone
- Carlos McKinney − piano, arranger
- Clarence Seay − double bass
- Eric Allen − drums
