= No Room for Argument =

Studio album by Wallace Roney
- Released: September 12, 2000
- Recorded: March 31 – April 3, 2000
- Studio: Power Station, New York City & Sonalyst, Waterford, Connecticut
- Genre: Jazz
- Length: 71:37
- Label: Stretch; SCD-9033
- Producer: Wallace Roney

Wallace Roney chronology
Village (1997)	No Room for Argument (2000)	Prototype (2004)

No Room for Argument is an album by American jazz trumpeter Wallace Roney, recorded in 2000 and released on the Stretch label.

== Reception ==
Professional ratings
Review scores
Source	Rating
AllMusic	4.5/5 stars
The Penguin Guide to Jazz Recordings	4/4 stars

The AllMusic review by Paula Edelstein stated, "This CD is packed with excellent straight-ahead, avant-garde, and free jazz ... Roney weaves its sound into the well-known orations delivered by King and Malcolm X, giving each note a new design that offers his solution to the challenges of performing respected works in a new medium. ... This CD is a great one and shows Roney as a leading jazz trumpeter."

In JazzTimes, Ron Wynn wrote: "No Room For Argument is ostensibly a tribute to Roney’s mentors and influences, but he obliterates the line between commemoration and mimicry. ... There are, however, some good things on this disc. When Roney sheds the pseudo-funk and retro-fusion gimmicks, he displays the melodic verve and pungent wit that got everyone excited when he worked in Art Blakey’s Jazz Messengers in the early ’80s. ... Roney deserves credit for trying to do something different within an improvising context, but this stumbles so far and is so uninspired that I hope it will ultimately prove just a blip on the screen rather than indicative of a trend."

Roney's obituary in The New York Times noted that "on No Room for Argument (2000), released on Stretch Records, Mr. Roney struck a nimble balance between historical reverence and futurist adventure, pairing a synthesizer with a Fender Rhodes electric piano and, at one point, mashing up parts of John Coltrane’s A Love Supreme with Davis’s Filles de Kilimanjaro."

== Track listing ==
All compositions by Wallace Roney except where noted

1. "No Room for Argument" – 5:29
2. "Homage and Acknowledgement (Love Supreme/Filles de Kilimanjaro)" (John Coltrane/Miles Davis) – 7:47
3. "Straight No Nothing" – 7:11
4. "Metropolis" – 4:33
5. "Christina" (Buster Williams) – 8:02
6. "Neubeings" – 10:14
7. "Cygroove" – 8:22
8. "He Who Knows" – 5:19
9. "Virtual Chocolate Cherry" – 8:27
10. "Midnight Blue" – 6:13

== Personnel ==
- Wallace Roney − trumpet
- Antoine Roney, Steve Hall − tenor saxophone, soprano saxophone, bass clarinet
- Geri Allen − piano, electric piano, synthesizer
- Adam Holzman – electric piano, organ, keyboards, synthesizer
- Buster Williams − bass
- Lenny White − drums
- Val "Gelder" Jeanty – sample programmer
