= Steve Berrios =

American jazz musician (1945–2013)

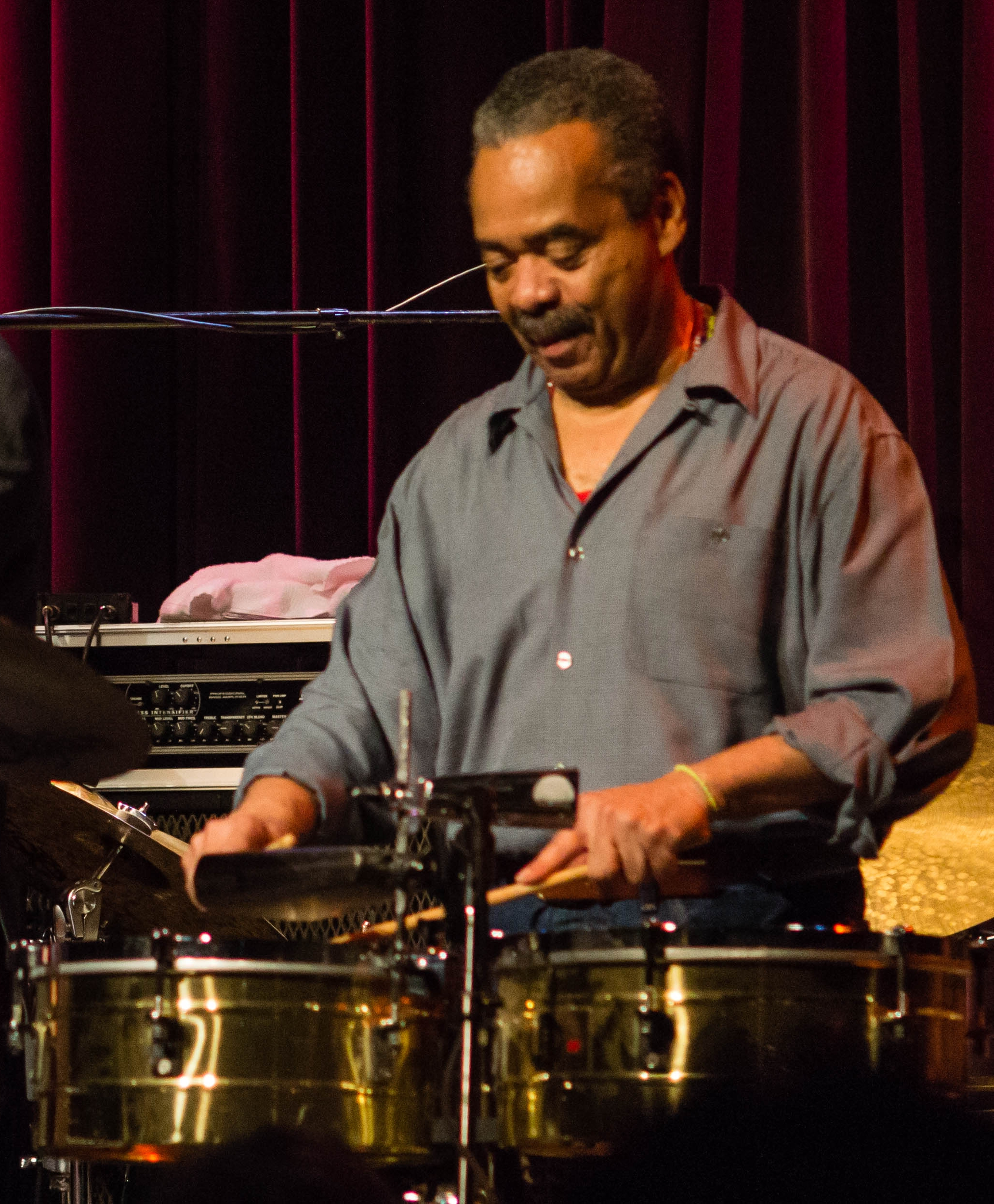
- Berrios in 2012
- Born: February 24, 1945; New York City, U.S.
- Died: July 25, 2013 (aged 68)
- Occupations: Jazz drummer and percussionist

Steve Berrios (February 24, 1945 – July 25, 2013) was an American jazz drummer and percussionist of Puerto Rican descent.

== Biography ==
Steve Berros was born in New York City to parents native to Puerto Rico. Starting out on trumpet while in public school, Berrios was influenced by his father, a professional drummer, and his neighbors in Upper Manhattan: Tito Puente, Willie Bobo and Mongo Santamaria. At 16, Berrios began winning talent and trumpet contests, including the famed Apollo Theater competitions, in which he placed first no less than five times. Switching his focus to drums and percussion, he started touring and recording with Mongo Santamaria at the age of 19.

Berrios learned to play batá sacred drums from Julito Collazo. He played conga, djembe, cowbells, marimba, timpani and glockenspiel in Dizzy Gillespie's band on a good-will tour of Cuba in the 1980s. In 1981, he became a founding member of the milestone Latin jazz group Jerry González & the Fort Apache Band. Berrios recorded more than a dozen albums as a member of the Fort Apache Band, including The River Is Deep (1982), Obatala (1988), Rumba Para Monk (1988) Earthdance (1990) and Moliendo Café (1991). He was also in M'Boom, a percussion group created by Max Roach.

Berrios also led his own group, Son Bacheche. And Then Some! (1997), one of the few albums he recorded at the head of his own group, was nominated for a Grammy Award for Best Latin Jazz Performance.

Berrios also played and recorded with artists such as Kenny Kirkland, Art Blakey, Tito Puente, Paquito D’Rivera, Pucho & His Latin Soul Brothers, Michael Brecker, Grover Washington, Hilton Ruiz and Miriam Makeba.

== Discography ==
=== As leader ===
- And Then Some (Milestone Records, 1996)

=== As sideman ===
With Jasmine - featuring Bill O'Connell, Carmen Lundy

- Jasmine (West 54 Records)

With Michael Brecker

- Now You See It… (Now You Don't) (GRP, 1990)

With Sonny Fortune

- A Better Understanding (Blue Note, 1995)

With The Harlem Experiment

- The Harlem Experiment (Ropeadope, 2007)

With Alphonse Mouzon

- Funky Snakefoot (Blue Note, 1973)

With Wallace Roney

- The Standard Bearer (Muse, 1989)
- Mistérios (Warner Bros., 1994)
- Village (Warner Bros., 1997)

With Roseanna Vitro

- Reaching for the Moon (Chase Music Group, 1991)

With Randy Weston

- Carnival (Freedom, 1974)

With Larry Willis

- Sunshower (Mapleshade, 2001)
