= Jeanty =

Jeanty is a surname. Notable people with the name include:

- Ashton Jeanty (born 2003), American football player
- Georges Jeanty, American comic book penciler illustrator
- Osvaldo Jeanty (born 1983), Canadian basketball coach and player
- Rashad Jeanty (born 1983), American football player
- Val Jeanty, Haitian electronic music artist
