= Spectrum Road =

Studio album by Spectrum Road
- Released: 2012
- Recorded: February 9–13, 2011
- Studio: Maggie's Farm, Pipersville, Pennsylvania
- Genre: Jazz fusion
- Length: 55:51
- Label: Palmetto Records; PM 2152
- Producer: Matt Balitsaris

Spectrum Road is the debut album by the American supergroup of the same name, featuring bassist and vocalist Jack Bruce, guitarist Vernon Reid, keyboard player John Medeski, and drummer Cindy Blackman Santana. The group's sole release, it was recorded in February 2011 at Maggie's Farm in Pipersville, Pennsylvania, and was issued in 2012 by Palmetto Records. The album pays homage to the jazz fusion band The Tony Williams Lifetime, and is named after the song "Via the Spectrum Road" from the 1969 Lifetime recording Emergency!. Bruce served as a personal link to Lifetime, as he participated in the creation of their second album, Turn It Over (1970).

The band's origins dated back to 2001, when Reid, who was touring with Bruce's group, suggested that they put together an ensemble to revisit and explore the music of Lifetime. Reid recommended that they include Medeski and Blackman Santana, and the quartet finally came together in 2008. Blackman Santana would record her own Lifetime tribute album, Another Lifetime, in 2010.

Although the album revolves around material from Lifetime recordings, the musicians were not interested in recreating the original music, and instead viewed the charts as jumping-off points. Reid reflected: "If this was focused on the so-called 'glories of the past' it would be dead on arrival. Since Tony's expression is only now being fully understood, we can take that momentum and run with it."

== Reception ==
Professional ratings
Review scores
Source	Rating
AllMusic	4/5 stars
The Absolute Sound	4/5 stars
All About Jazz	4/5 stars

In a review for AllMusic, Thom Jurek wrote: "Spectrum Road's self-titled debut delivers in full on the supergroup promise; in addition, they provide the kind of forward-looking tribute that a pioneer like Williams truly deserves."

Steve Greenlee of Jazz Times stated: "The 10-song program... is vicious but well plotted. In addition to jazz-rock fusion, there are elements of prog-rock, funk, metal and blues in this stew; depending on the moment, one particular style may rise to the fore... It's crazy good. Even the listener needs a rest when this album is over."

Writing for Jambands.com, Brian Robbins commented: "the sum of these parts is every bit as good as you might hope it would be... Egos? None. Talent? Oh, man … this was meant to be."

The Absolute Sound's Derk Richardson remarked: "This is not polite jazz. The ferocious (yet nuanced) recorded performance throws down a gauntlet, as well, and clears the decks of any expectations listeners might bring to the experience... For anyone with a soft spot for the icons of prog-rock and jazz-fusion... Spectrum Road is musical manna from heaven."

Doug Collette of All About Jazz wrote: "Pure power takes precedence over finesse on Spectrum Road, but just barely... there's enough loyalty to the source... without undermining the spontaneity of the moment(s)."

In an article for Burning Ambulance, Phil Freeman stated that the musicians "absorb tunes from all versions of Lifetime into a single encompassing vision that's loud, hard-rocking, sometimes funky, frequently quite exploratory, and more adventurous than most repertory projects or tribute bands. They're not actually trying to sound exactly like the original Lifetime, from any year or any album; they're honoring the singular vision that flowed through all those albums by making the music new."

Writing for Something Else!, S. Victor Aaron commented: "Spectrum Road reintroduces the limitless possibilities that were abundant... when Williams and his fearless Lifetime band were racing across the frontier and leaving most everyone behind. Here is a supergroup that actually lives up to the billing, making their debut album the rock-jazz event of the year. And Tony Williams' legacy gets a long overdue upgrade."

A writer for Grateful Web remarked: "It's apparent from the get-go that more than just another supergroup, this is a deeply attuned band speaking a rarefied improvisational language. As the recording unfolds, there's a primal urgency to the performances... Each of these four iconoclasts play to the peak of their musical powers, yet ultimately achieve a whole greater than the sum of their individual parts."

== Track listing ==
1. "Vuelta Abajo" (Tony Williams) – 5:30
2. "There Comes a Time" (Tony Williams) – 4:22
3. "Coming Back Home" (Jan Hammer) – 4:40
4. "Where" (John McLaughlin) – 12:44
5. "An T-eilan Muileach" (Traditional) – 4:33
6. "Vashkar" (Carla Bley) – 5:57
7. "One Word" (John McLaughlin) – 4:18
8. "Blues for Tillmon" (Cindy Blackman Santana, Jack Bruce, John Medeski, Vernon Reid) – 5:41
9. "Allah Be Praised" (Larry Young) – 4:12
10. "Wild Life" (Tony Williams) – 4:53

== Personnel ==
- Jack Bruce – bass, vocals
- Vernon Reid – guitar
- John Medeski – organ, mellotron
- Cindy Blackman Santana – drums, vocals
