= J. D. Allen =

American jazz saxophonist, composer (born 1972)

- Born: December 11, 1972 (age 53); Detroit, Michigan
- Genre: Jazz
- Instrument: Tenor saxophone
- Years active: 1996–present
- Labels: Criss Cross, Sunnyside, Savant

J. D. Allen III (born John Daniel Allen III, December 11, 1972) is an American jazz tenor saxophonist and composer.

== Career ==
After moving to New York City, Allen played with George Cables, Betty Carter, Ron Carter, Jack DeJohnette, Frank Foster, Butch Morris, David Murray, and Wallace Roney. Closer to his generation, he has played with Lucian Ban, Cindy Blackman, Gerald Cleaver, Dave Douglas, Orrin Evans, Duane Eubanks, Marcus Gilmore, Russell Gunn, Winard Harper, Elisabeth Kontomanou, Meshell Ndegeocello, Jeremy Pelt, Eric Revis.

Allen's first solo album, In Search Of (Red Records, 1999), led to his selection as Best New Artist in Italy. In 2003, his second album (Pharaoh's Children) was chosen as a top ten album of the year by Jazziz magazine. Ten years later he was named best composer and best tenor saxophonist in the Critics' Poll at DownBeat magazine. A critic at NPR picked his album Victory (Sunnyside, 2011) for the number three spot in the top twenty albums of 2011.

Since moving to the Savant label (2012), Allen has released albums at a steady pace of one each year. A recurring line-up is the Trio with bassist Gregg August and drummer Rudy Royston, but he has also added guests (Liberty Ellman, Charlie Hunter), used different rhythm sections and released one solo album during the pandemic (Queen City, 2021). His 2026 album Söwt was recorded in Morrocco and features an international band featuring musicians from Bolivia, Cuba and Morroco. Allen also works under the pseudonyms "Bigger Thomas" and "Cross Damon".

== Discography ==
=== As leader ===
- In Search Of (Red, 1999)
- Pharaoh's Children (Criss Cross, 2003)
- I Am I Am (Sunnyside, 2008)
- Shine! (Sunnyside, 2009)
- Victory! (Sunnyside, 2011)
- The Matador and the Bull (Savant, 2012)
- Grace (Savant, 2013)
- Bloom (Savant, 2014)
- Graffiti (Savant, 2015)
- Americana: Musings on Jazz and Blues (Savant, 2016)
- Radio Flyer (Savant, 2017)
- Love Stone (Savant, 2018)
- Barracoon (Savant, 2019)
- Toys / Die Dreaming (Savant, 2020)
- Queen City (Savant, 2021)
- Americana, Vol. 2 (Savant, 2022)
- This (Savant, 2023)
- The Dark, The Light, The Grey and the Colorful (Savant, 2024)
- Love Letters (The Ballad Sessions) (Savant, 2025)
- Söwt (Savant, 2026)

=== As co-leader ===
- Red Stars (2004) with Victor Lewis and Fabio Morgera

=== As sideman ===
With Cindy Blackman

- Works on Canvas (2000)
- Someday... (2001)
- Music for the New Millennium (2006)

With Orrin Evans

- The Band – Live at Widener University (2005)
- Easy Now (2005)
- Liberation Blues (2014)

With Winard Harper

- Trap Dancer (1998)
- Winard (1999)

With Lisa Hilton

- Twilight & Blues (2009)
- Underground (2011)
- American Impressions (2012)
- Kaleidoscope (2014)
- Horizons (2015)
- Nocturnal (2016)
- Escapism (2017)
- Chalkboard Destiny (2019)
- life is beautiful (2022)

With Fabio Morgera

- Slick (1998)
- Colors (2000)

With Jeremy Pelt

- November (2008)
- Men of Honor (2010)
- The Talented Mr. Pelt (2011)
- Soul (2012)

With Tarbaby

- Tarbaby (2009)
- The End of Fear (2010)

With others

- Duane Eubanks, Second Take (1998)
- Elisabeth Kontomanou, Embrace (1998)
- Russell Gunn, Blue on the D.L. (2002)
- Eric Revis, Tales of a Stuttering Mime (2004)
- Kerem Görsev, New York Days (2005)
- Lucian Ban, The Tuba Project (2005)
- Stacy Dillard, cPhyve (2006)
- Stacy Dillard, Elite State of Mind (2006)
- Nigel Kennedy, Blue Note Sessions (2006)
- Gerald Cleaver, Detroit (2007)
- Ozan Musluoglu, 40th Day (2011)
- Jaimeo Brown, Transcendence (2013)
- Kris Davis, Diatom Ribbons (2019)
- Erick Wyatt, The Golden Rule: For Sonny (2019)
- Gregg August, Four by Six (2012)
- Gregg August, Dialogues On Race (2020)
- Quincy Davis, Q Vision (2020)
