= A Place in Time (album) =

Studio album by Wallace Roney
- Released: November 4, 2016
- Recorded: June 10–11, 2016
- Venue: Water Music Recorders, Hoboken, New Jersey
- Genre: Jazz
- Length: 61:33
- Label: HighNote; HCD 7295
- Producer: Wallace Roney

Wallace Roney chronology
Understanding (2013)	A Place in Time (2016)	Blue Dawn-Blue Nights (2019)

A Place in Time is an album by trumpeter/composer Wallace Roney, recorded in 2016 and released on the HighNote label.

== Reception ==
Professional ratings
Review scores
Source	Rating
Financial Times	3/5 stars

Financial Times reviewer Mike Hobart stated, "Roney's beautifully rounded tone and clear sense of purpose is matched by the impressively muscular playing of young saxophonist Ben Solomon; veteran alto saxophonist Gary Bartz beefs up the brass". In JazzTimes, Philip Booth noted, "A Place in Time, suggests that the group's penchant for fruitful compositions, dynamic interplay and bracing solos remains intact. More than half of the set is devoted to originals ... Here's hoping it won't take another 15 years for a sequel".

== Track listing ==
1. "Around and Through" (Patrice Rushen) – 6:43
2. "Elegy" (Tony Williams) – 7:44
3. "Air Dancing" (Buster Williams) – 6:25
4. "Observance" (Wallace Roney, Ben Solomon) – 4:09
5. "Ardéche" (Solomon) – 7:26
6. "L's Bop" (Lenny White) – 6:28
7. "Clair de Lune" (Claude Debussy) – 5:27
8. "My Ship" (Kurt Weill, Ira Gershwin) – 5:07

== Personnel ==
- Wallace Roney – trumpet
- Gary Bartz – alto saxophone (tracks 3, 4, 5 & 7)
- Ben Solomon – tenor saxophone (tracks 1–7)
- Patrice Rushen – piano (tracks 1–7)
- Buster Williams – bass
- Lenny White – drums
