= Works on Canvas =

Studio album by Cindy Blackman
- Released: 2000
- Recorded: April 9, 1999
- Studios: Sound On Sound Recording, New York City
- Genre: Jazz
- Length: 66:49
- Labels: HighNote, HCD 7038
- Producer: Don Sickler

Cindy Blackman chronology
In the Now (1999)	Works on Canvas (2000)	Someday... (2001)

Works on Canvas is an album led by drummer Cindy Blackman which was recorded in 1999 and released on the HighNote label.

== Reception ==
Professional ratings
Review scores
Source	Rating
AllMusic	3/5 stars
The Penguin Guide to Jazz Recordings	3.5/4 stars

Michael G. Nastos of AllMusic stated, "Blackman, more than a timekeeper but less a melodist (like Max Roach), thankfully continues to grow and not sell out to more overtly commercial considerations. Her desire to be a jazz player is clear, and she's making strong inroads to being a formidable bandleader as well". In JazzTimes, John Murph called it "an amazing portrait of one of this generation’s most colorful drummers".

The Washington Post's Mike Joyce commented: "There's no concealing the painterly touches that inspired the title of... Works on Canvas... throughout the album, Blackman draws from a broad palette of tonal colors to create striking contrasts in light and dark, motion and stillness."

== Track listing ==
All compositions by Cindy Blackman except where noted

1. "Green Dolphin Street" (Bronisław Kaper, Ned Washington) – 9:04
2. "Mudee Ya" (J. D. Allen) – 8:06
3. "My Isha" (Carlton Holmes) – 2:53
4. "The Three Van Goghs - 1" – 1:16
5. "Spanish Colored Romance" – 6:53
6. "Ballad Like" – 6:36
7. "My Ship" (Kurt Weill, Ira Gershwin) – 5:39
8. "April in Paris" (Vernon Duke, Yip Harburg) – 7:24
9. "Beautiful World" (Holmes) – 5:27
10. "The Three Van Goghs - 2" – 3:14
11. "Sword of the Painter" – 7:58
12. "The Three Van Goghs - 3" – 2:19

== Personnel ==
- Cindy Blackman – drums
- J. D. Allen – tenor saxophone (tracks 1–3, 5–9 & 11)
- Carlton Holmes – piano, Fender Rhodes piano, keyboards
- George Mitchell – bass (tracks 1–3, 5–9 & 11)
