= Crunchin' =

Studio album by Wallace Roney
- Released: 1993
- Recorded: July 30, 1993
- Studio: Van Gelder Studio, Englewood Cliffs, NJ
- Genre: Jazz
- Length: 54:29
- Label: Muse; MCD 5518
- Producer: Don Sickler

Wallace Roney chronology
Munchin' (1993)	Crunchin' (1993)	A Tribute to Miles (1994)

Crunchin' is an album by American jazz trumpeter Wallace Roney which was recorded in 1993 and released on the Muse label.

== Reception ==
Professional ratings
Review scores
Source	Rating
AllMusic	4.5/5 stars

The AllMusic review by Ron Wynn stated, "Trumpeter Wallace Roney sounds poignant and fabulous throughout the eight tracks on his latest release. ... Alto saxophonist Antonio Hart chimes in with equal facility and spark, while Geri Allen shows that she is just as outstanding as an accompanist on standards and hard bop as in trios or as a leader".

== Track listing ==
1. "Woody 'n' You" (Dizzy Gillespie) − 4:46
2. "What's New?" (Bob Haggart, Johnny Burke) − 7:51
3. "Angel Eyes" (Matt Dennis, Earl Brent) − 6:22
4. "Swing Spring" (Miles Davis) − 5:39
5. "Time After Time" (Jule Styne, Sammy Cahn) − 5:55
6. "We See" (Thelonious Monk) − 6:53
7. "You Stepped Out of a Dream" (Nacio Herb Brown, Gus Kahn) − 4:16
8. "Misterioso" (Monk) − 12:47

== Personnel ==
- Wallace Roney – trumpet
- Antonio Hart – alto saxophone (tracks 1–2, 4, 6–8)
- Geri Allen – piano
- Ron Carter – bass
- Kenny Washington – drums
