= The Standard Bearer (album) =

Studio album by Wallace Roney
- Released: 1990
- Recorded: March 3, 1989
- Studio: Van Gelder Studio, Englewood Cliffs, NJ
- Genre: Jazz
- Length: 43:28
- Label: Muse; MR 5372
- Producer: Don Sickler

Wallace Roney chronology
Intuition (1988)	The Standard Bearer (1990)	Obsession (1990)

The Standard Bearer is the third album by American jazz trumpeter Wallace Roney which was recorded in 1989 and released on the Muse label early the following year.

== Reception ==
Professional ratings
Review scores
Source	Rating
AllMusic	4/5 stars

The AllMusic review by Scott Yanow stated, "Roney's The Standard Bearer (dedicated to Woody Shaw) is excellent. ... Creative frameworks and inspired solos keep this recording from being just a bop revival session. In fact, except for Roney's sound, everything about the music is quite fresh".

== Track listing ==
1. "The Way You Look Tonight" (Jerome Kern, Dorothy Fields) − 6:12
2. "I Didn't Know What Time It Was" (Richard Rodgers, Lorenz Hart) − 7:17
3. "Don't Blame Me" (Jimmy McHugh, Fields) − 7:02
4. "Con Alma" (Dizzy Gillespie) − 6:38
5. "Giant Steps" (John Coltrane) − 5:42
6. "When Your Lover Has Gone" (Einar Aaron Swan) − 5:13
7. "Loose" (Wallace Roney, Cindy Blackman, Steve Berrios) − 5:24

== Personnel ==
- Wallace Roney − trumpet
- Gary Thomas − tenor saxophone (tracks 1–6)
- Mulgrew Miller − piano (tracks 1–6)
- Charnett Moffett − bass (tracks 1–6)
- Cindy Blackman − drums
- Steve Berrios − percussion (track 7)
