= Lucian Ban =

American jazz pianist of Romanian origin

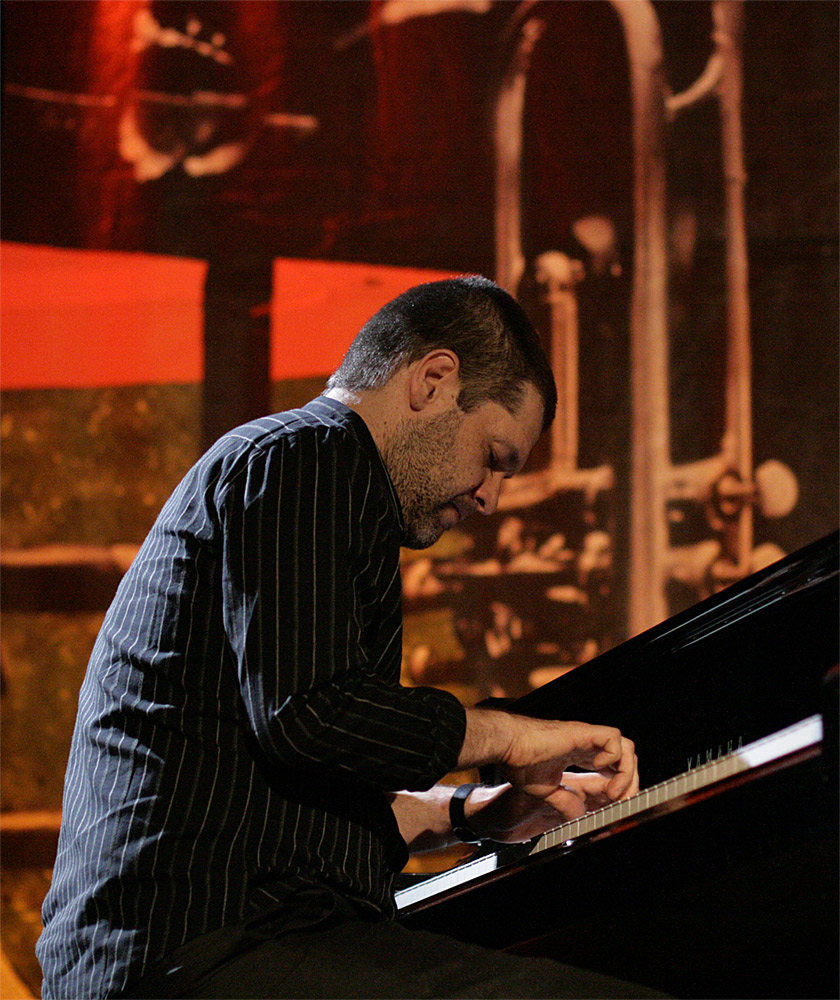
- Lucian Ban in 2007

Background information
- Genres: Jazz
- Occupation: Musician
- Instruments: Piano, keyboards
- Website: www.lucianban.com

Lucian Ban (born 1969) is a Romanian-American jazz pianist.

== Biography ==
Raised in the tiny farming village of Teaca (Transylvania, Romania), Ban grew up listening to folk songs performed at weddings, birthdays, holidays, and other celebrations.

At the age of seven, he moved to Cluj, where he started classical piano and composition training.

He studied composition at Bucharest Music Academy from 1992 to 1995. He established the group Jazz Unit in 1995 and released two albums as a leader for Green Records in Romania.

In 1999 he moved to New York City, where he studied for two years at New School University. His American debut album, Somethin' Holy, in duet with baritone saxophonist Alex Harding was followed by the albums Premonition (2003), Tuba Project (featuring Bob Stewart, 2006) and Playground (featuring Jorge Sylvester, 2006). The Lumination Ensemble, co-led with Alex Harding and featuring drummer Barry Altschul, was nominated one of the ten best shows of 2003 by All About Jazz.

Ban has played with Pheeroan AkLaff, J. D. Allen, Art Baron, Gerald Cleaver, Curtis Fowlkes, Mark Helias, Ron Horton, Brad Jones, Sam Newsome, Reggie Nicholson, Damion Reid, and Nasheet Waits.

== Awards and honors ==
- 1999 – From Now On wins Best Jazz Album of 1999 in Romania
- 2000 – The theater show Azi ma Ubu after Alfred Jarry wins Great Prize at the Bucharest Humoror Theatre Festival in Bucharest, Romania
- 2005 – Original score for the play Philosopher Fox nominated for Outstanding Sound Design and Best Score at the New York Innovative Theatre Awards
- 2005–06 Music curator for Kavehaz Jazz Club, New York City
- 2006 – Nominated for Best European Jazz Musician by the Hans Koller Foundation and the Austrian government

== Discography ==
- Somethin' Holy with Alex Harding (CIMP, 2002)
- Premonition (CIMP, 2003)
- Playground (Jazzaway, 2006)
- Enesco Re-Imagined with John Hebert (Sunnyside, 2010)
- Mystery (Sunnyside, 2013)
- Transylvanian Concert with Mat Maneri (ECM, 2013)
- Songs from Afar (Sunnyside, 2016)
- Sounding Tears with Mat Maneri and Evan Parker (Clean Feed, 2017)
