= Mystikal (album) =

Studio album by Wallace Roney
- Released: September 25, 2005
- Recorded: May 28, 2005
- Studio: Sony, New York City
- Genre: Jazz
- Length: 59:40
- Label: HighNote; HCD 7145
- Producer: Don Sickler

Wallace Roney chronology
Prototype (2004)	Mystikal (2005)	Jazz (2007)

Mystikal is an album by trumpeter/composer Wallace Roney, recorded in 2005 and released on the HighNote label.

== Reception ==
Professional ratings
Review scores
Source	Rating
All About Jazz	4/5 stars
AllMusic	4/5 stars
The Penguin Guide to Jazz Recordings	3.5/4 stars

AllMusic's Matt Collar said, "Mystikal is a modern album made up of vintage parts. Which is to say that while Roney has deep affection for the sounds of '60s jazz and '70s funk and fusion, he is a resolutely forward-thinking musician who borrows from a variety of sources and time periods even when the overall sound is funky".

On All About Jazz, John Kelman noted, "Mystikal continues Roney's progression. With the same core group as on Prototype ... it's not just about the evolution of the leader's approach, this time it's also about the evolution of a collective sound. ... As Roney's concept becomes more eclectic, it paradoxically becomes more focused. Mystikal continues his path towards combining past and present—with, most importantly, a clear eye on the future". Another review stated, "Roney's playing on Mystikal is some of his most lucid on record. The greater achievement, however, is the way he develops a template for how modern jazz can be re-immersed in funk rhythms without sounding dated, and how he then successfully merging turntablism into that same context. ... While all of the last three Roney records have presented different angles, we can't be that conclusive about the quality and insight of his vision until an entire record presents the concept. Eclecticism is cool, but it can make you look tentative, too. Still, this is a good record and pretty fresh music overall".

In JazzTimes, Mike Shanley wrote: "The album alternates between acoustic tracks like the title piece or Kenny Dorham’s “Poetic” and electric songs. One of Roney's more compelling qualities comes in the way he utilizes elements of the latter setting–basic funk riffs, clavinet, electric piano–to keep the fire burning rather than smoothing down the melodic potential. ... The only distraction from the program comes from Jeanty's samples and spoken-word interludes, which seem to pop up every time the horns take a break".

== Track listing ==
All compositions by Wallace Roney except where noted

1. "Atlantis" (Wayne Shorter) – 8:41
2. "Mystikal" – 6:20
3. "Stargaze" – 7:59
4. "Just My Imagination" (Barrett Strong, Norman Whitfield) – 5:32
5. "Hey Young World" – 7:33
6. "Poetic" (Kenny Dorham) – 5:14
7. "Baby's Breath" (Geri Allen, Wallace Roney) – 6:21
8. "Nice Town" (Allen, Roney) – 6:59
9. "I'll Keep Loving You" (Bud Powell) – 5:01

== Personnel ==
- Wallace Roney – trumpet
- Antoine Roney – alto saxophone, tenor saxophone, bass clarinet
- Geri Allen – piano, Fender Rhodes piano, keyboards
- Adam Holzman – keyboards, Fender Rhodes piano
- Matthew Garrison – double bass, electric bass
- Eric Allen – drums
- Val Jeanty – turntables
- Bobby Thomas – percussion
