= Home (Wallace Roney album) =

Studio album by Wallace Roney
- Released: March 13, 2012
- Recorded: November 23–24, 2010
- Studio: Area 51, New York City
- Genre: Jazz
- Length: 60:35
- Label: HighNote; HCD 7218
- Producer: Wallace Roney, Dawn Jones

Wallace Roney chronology
If Only for One Night (2010)	Home (2012)	Understanding (2013)

Home is an album by trumpeter/composer Wallace Roney, recorded in 2010 and released on the HighNote label.

== Reception ==
Professional ratings
Review scores
Source	Rating
Financial Times	4/5 stars
The Observer	4/5 stars

Financial Times reviewer Mike Hobart stated, "Trumpeter Wallace Roney and his saxophonist brother Antoine's long-standing partnership is steeped in the influence of the second great Miles Davis acoustic band. Both Roneys have mouth-watering tones and spin long fluent lines with imperious logic, and their working rhythm sections are fluid and spacious. Add in passing references to hip-hop, strong musical personalities and potent writing ... and a classic tradition springs to life". In The Observer, Dave Gelly noted, "No one could call these eight numbers easy listening but they have a concentrated power and moments of quite devastating boldness and originality". JazzTimes' Philip Booth wrote: "Old-school funk and fusion? Contemporary R&B? Straight-ahead jazz? Open-air modal music? ... Roney, joined by his regular bandmates and several guests, touches on several of the stylistic strains mentioned above on Home. It's chockfull of the leader's dazzling displays, including the long tones and then quick runs .. there is never a dull moment".

== Track listing ==
All compositions by Wallace Roney except where noted

1. "Utopia" (Wayne Shorter) – 7:20
2. "Home" – 7:28
3. "Pacific Express" (John McLaughlin) – 6:49
4. "Plaza Real" (Shorter) – 10:20
5. "Dawn" – 8:34
6. "Evolution of the Blues" – 8:06
7. "Ghost of Yesterday" – 9:05
8. "Revive" (Bobby Ward) – 2:53

== Personnel ==
- Wallace Roney – trumpet
- Antoine Roney – soprano saxophone, tenor saxophone
- Aruán Ortiz – keyboards
- Rashaan Carter – bass
- Kush Abadey (tracks 1, 3 & 6), Darrell Green (tracks: 4 & 5), Bobby Ward (tracks 2, 7 &, 8) – drums
- Doug Carn – organ (track 5)
- George Burton – Fender Rhodes piano (track 4)
- Shakoor Sanders – percussion (track 2)
