= In the Now (Cindy Blackman album) =

Studio album by Cindy Blackman
- Released: May 19, 1998
- Recorded: November 18, 1997
- Studios: Van Gelder Studio, Englewood Cliffs, New Jersey
- Genre: Jazz
- Length: 63:23
- Labels: HighNote, HCD 7024
- Producer: Don Sickler

Cindy Blackman chronology
The Oracle (1996)	In the Now (1998)	Works on Canvas (1999)

In the Now is an album by the drummer Cindy Blackman, recorded in 1997 and released on the HighNote label.

== Reception ==
Professional ratings
Review scores
Source	Rating
AllMusic	2.5/5 stars
The Penguin Guide to Jazz Recordings	3/4 stars

Ken Dryden of AllMusic stated, "Cindy Blackman has proved herself as an accomplished percussionist who doesn't overdo it, but there's something missing from this outing. ... most of her compositions, which make up the bulk of the CD, just don't hold one's interest. ... Instead, check out Blackman's earlier efforts". In JazzTimes, Bill Milkowski called it "her most profound and heartfelt statement to date" and wrote: "After years of trying to find her own place in the music, Cindy Blackman arrives in high style with In the Now.

The Washington Post's Mike Joyce commented: "For all its spontaneous interplay and improvisations... In the Now is firmly rooted in the past... Blackman is the principal composer, arranger and catalyst, contributing seven of the session's nine tunes and shaping all of them with a keen sense of dynamics, drama and texture. While her presence isn't overpowering, it is always felt."

== Track listing ==
All compositions by Cindy Blackman except where noted

1. "In the Now" – 6:45
2. "A Banana for Ron" – 3:22
3. "Passage" – 6:40
4. "A King Among Men" – 15:00
5. "Sophia" – 7:24
6. "Prince of Darkness" (Wayne Shorter) – 7:13
7. "Happy House" (Ornette Coleman) – 4:34
8. "A Strawberry for Cindy" – 4:30
9. "Let Love Rule" (Lenny Kravitz) – 7:55

== Personnel ==
- Cindy Blackman - drums
- Ravi Coltrane - tenor saxophone, soprano saxophone
- Jacky Terrasson - piano, Fender Rhodes
- Ron Carter - bass
