= Intuition (Wallace Roney album) =

Studio album by Wallace Roney
- Released: 1988
- Recorded: January 6, 1988
- Studio: Van Gelder Studio, Englewood Cliffs, NJ
- Genre: Jazz
- Length: 47:29 CD release with additional track
- Label: Muse; MR 5346
- Producer: Don Sickler, Joe Fields

Wallace Roney chronology
Verses (1987)	Intuition (1988)	The Standard Bearer (1989)

Intuition is the second album by American jazz trumpeter Wallace Roney which was recorded in 1988 and released on the Muse label.

== Reception ==
Professional ratings
Review scores
Source	Rating
AllMusic	4/5 stars

The AllMusic review by Scott Yanow stated, "the music is as strong as one would expect, reflecting Roney's long stint with the Tony Williams Quintet".

== Track listing ==
All compositions by Wallace Roney except where noted

1. "Intuition" (Cindy Blackman) − 5:43
2. "Opus One Point Five" (Ron Carter) − 5:40
3. "Ahead" − 7:57
4. "Taberah" − 5:49
5. "Sometimes My Heart Cries" (Blackman) − 5:34
6. "For Duke" − 8:22
7. "Willow Weep for Me" (Ann Ronell) − 8:24 additional track on CD release

== Personnel ==
- Wallace Roney − trumpet
- Kenny Garrett − alto saxophone (tracks 1–3, 5 & 6)
- Gary Thomas − tenor saxophone (tracks 1 & 4–6)
- Mulgrew Miller − piano
- Ron Carter − bass
- Cindy Blackman − drums
