= Village (album) =

Studio album by Wallace Roney
- Released: August 12, 1997
- Recorded: December 3–5, 1996
- Studio: Sear Sound, New York City
- Genre: Jazz
- Length: 60:13
- Label: Warner Bros. 9 46649
- Producer: Lenny White, Matt Pierson, Wallace Roney

Wallace Roney chronology
| The Wallace Roney Quintet (1996) | Village (1997) | No Room for Argument (2000) |

Village is an album by American jazz trumpeter Wallace Roney, recorded in late 1996 and released on the Warner Bros. label the following year.

== Reception ==
Professional ratings
Review scores
| Source | Rating |
|---|---|
| AllMusic | 4/5 stars |

The AllMusic review by Richard S. Ginell stated, "This is really two albums in one, with a clear line of demarcation between two concepts. Roney says that he wanted to "incorporate African rhythms with a Nefertiti approach" on the whole CD, but Nefertiti easily overwhelms, even obliterates, the African element up until track six ... the music becomes more interesting, sometimes following the direction of Herbie Hancock's Mwandishi Sextet ... by now, the boo birds have been out again accusing Roney of being a Miles imitator. But the means are justified here, because Roney creates thoughtful music within his post-Miles idiom and, like his late idol, tries to stretch himself". This was illustrated by JazzTimes' Owen Cordel admitting, "I have mixed feelings about Roney. For one thing, it’s impossible to review his playing and not mention Miles Davis (and in connection with this album, the writing and playing of Miles’ mid-’60s quintet.) Shouldn’t Roney have his own voice? On the other hand, the trumpeter plays extremely well within the confines of his chosen persona. His soft attack and burnished tone make the notes glow... In terms of improvising, Roney and the rhythm section perform admirably. But the nagging portrait of Roney as a Miles imitator lingers".

In The Washington Post, Geoffrey Himes wrote that "on Village, drummer Lenny White and bassist Clarence Seay keep prodding and provoking the soloists by inserting abrupt rolls, loud bursts, pauses and even time changes into the mix. And in the heady ensemble sections, Roney's trumpet plays counterpoint -- sometimes dissonant counterpoint -- against the saxophones and piano. The leader's insistence that his musicians constantly challenge each other rhythmically and harmonically is quite African in its concept and explains not only the album's title but its vibrant sense of conflict and resolution".

On All About Jazz, Rick Bruner said, "There are many rewards awaiting listeners in the latest offering from trumpeter Wallace Roney. There’s the controlled fire of Mr. Roney’s trumpet lines, the equally hot playing of wife, Geri Allen, on piano and brother, Antoine Roney, on tenor saxophone, and the rare treat of hearing Lenny White’s amazing drum work. Add inspired guest spots from Chick Corea, Pharoah Sanders, and Michael Brecker and it adds up to one exciting package. ... For those of you with an aversion to electronics, never fear! They are subtle and effective. No less than you’d expect in the hands of this great band. One of the more exciting releases of 1997, Village is a keeper".

== Track listing ==
All compositions by Wallace Roney except where noted

1. "Affinity" (Chick Corea) – 7:45
2. "Inner Urge" (Joe Henderson) – 4:24
3. "I Love You" (Cole Porter) – 8:51
4. "The Pharoah" – 6:51
5. "Aknaaba" (Antoine Roney) – 4:34
6. "Village" – 6:20
7. "Eternal One" – 6:05
8. "EBO" (Lenny White) – 10:00
9. "Oshirike" – 5:23

== Personnel ==
- Wallace Roney – trumpet, arranger
- Antoine Roney (tracks 4, 6–9) – tenor saxophone, soprano saxophone, bass clarinet
- Michael Brecker – tenor saxophone (tracks 2–3)
- Pharoah Sanders – tenor saxophone (tracks 4, 8)
- Chick Corea – piano, electric piano, arranger (tracks 1–4, 8)
- Geri Allen – piano (tracks 5–9)
- Robert "Baabe" Irving III – synthesizer (tracks 6–9)
- Clarence Seay – double bass
- Lenny White – drums
- Steve Berrios – percussion (tracks 3, 6–7, Interludes)
