= Code Red (Cindy Blackman album) =

Studio album by Cindy Blackman
- Released: 1992
- Recorded: October 19, 1990
- Studios: Van Gelder Studio, Englewood Cliffs, New Jersey
- Genre: Jazz
- Length: 52:03
- Labels: Muse, MCD 5365
- Producer: Don Sickler

Cindy Blackman chronology
Arcane (1987)	Code Red (1992)	Telepathy (1992)

Code Red is an album led by drummer Cindy Blackman which was recorded in 1990 and released on the Muse label in 1992.

== Reception ==
Professional ratings
Review scores
Source	Rating
AllMusic	3/5 stars
The Rolling Stone Jazz & Blues Album Guide	4/5 stars
The Virgin Encyclopedia of Jazz	3/5 stars

Ted Panken, writing for The Rolling Stone Jazz & Blues Album Guide, called Code Red "a rhythmic tour de force," and stated that it "elicits some of the most powerful performances on record up to that time" from the musicians. He concluded: "Code Red recodes [Tony] Williams the Milesian and '80s group leader to remarkable effect. This one is delightful over repeated listenings."

== Track listing ==
All compositions by Cindy Blackman except where noted

1. "Code Red" – 6:53
2. "Anxiety" – 5:19
3. "Next Time Forever" – 6:34
4. "Something for Art (Drum Solo)" – 6:35
5. "'Round Midnight" (Thelonious Monk, Cootie Williams Bernie Hanighen) – 9:05
6. "Circles" – 5:31
7. "Face in the Dark" – 6:13
8. "Green" – 5:30

== Personnel ==
- Cindy Blackman - drums
- Wallace Roney - trumpet (tracks 1–3 & 5–8)
- Steve Coleman - alto saxophone (tracks 1–3 & 5–8)
- Kenny Barron - piano (tracks 1–3 & 5–8)
- Lonnie Plaxico - bass (tracks 1–3 & 5–8)
