= The Oracle (Cindy Blackman album) =

Studio album by Cindy Blackman
- Released: 1996
- Recorded: January 23, 1995
- Studios: Van Gelder Studio, Englewood Cliffs, New Jersey
- Genre: Jazz
- Length: 54:05
- Labels: Muse, MCD 5542
- Producers: Cindy Blackman, Don Sickler

Cindy Blackman chronology
| Telepathy (1992) | The Oracle (1996) | In the Now (1997) |

The Oracle is an album led by drummer Cindy Blackman which was recorded in 1995 and released on the Muse label.

== Reception ==
Professional ratings
Review scores
| Source | Rating |
|---|---|
| AllMusic | 2.5/5 stars |
| The Rolling Stone Jazz & Blues Album Guide | 4/5 stars |

Jason Ankeny of AllMusic stated simply, "Blackman took time off from touring with rocker Lenny Kravitz to cut her fourth record, on which she leads a band including bassist Ron Carter, pianist Kenny Barron and Gary Bartz on alto sax".

Ted Panken, writing for The Rolling Stone Jazz & Blues Album Guide, called the band "an all-star unit... at the peak of their powers," and commented: "The ensemble sound bears Blackman's indelible stamp; she's refined her conception to assert idiomatic individuality in a multiplicity of contexts."

== Track listing ==
All compositions by Cindy Blackman except where noted

1. "The Oracle" – 9:31
2. "Crazy He Calls Me" (Bob Russell, Carl Sigman) – 7:35
3. "A.J." – 5:28
4. "Beatrice" (Sam Rivers) – 6:32
5. "Who Needs Forever? (Quincy Jones) – 5:28
6. "Traffic" – 6:45
7. "Why" – 5:21
8. "Our Blues" – 7:25

== Personnel ==
- Cindy Blackman - drums
- Gary Bartz - soprano saxophone, alto saxophone
- Kenny Barron - piano
- Ron Carter - bass
