= Prototype (Wallace Roney album) =

Studio album by Wallace Roney
- Released: October 12, 2004
- Recorded: February 23, 2004
- Studio: Sony, New York City
- Genre: Jazz
- Length: 53:39
- Label: HighNote; HCD 7116
- Producer: Don Sickler

Wallace Roney chronology
| No Room for Argument (2000) | Prototype (2004) | Mystikal (2005) |

Prototype is an album by trumpeter/composer Wallace Roney, recorded in 2004 and released on the HighNote label.

== Reception ==
Professional ratings
Review scores
| Source | Rating |
|---|---|
| All About Jazz | 3.5/5 stars |
| AllMusic | 4/5 stars |
| The Penguin Guide to Jazz Recordings | 3/4 stars |

On All About Jazz, John Kelman noted, "Roney has chosen a starting point for his music—that of the transitional Miles period of Nefertiti through Filles de Kilimanjaro — and steadfastly evolved the idea, incorporating contemporary technologies and rhythms, painting a picture of where Miles might have gone had he been more evolutionary than revolutionary ... Prototype continues to evolve Roney's conception of jazz, one that successfully combines inarguable roots with a more contemporary view, incorporating a diversity of influences into a blend where the fundamental notion is that of freedom, but, like Miles before him, with a clearly-defined rhythmic and harmonic basis".

In JazzTimes, Mike Shanley wrote: "Prototype has a definite modern feel, fastening 1960s Miles Davis ambience to modern R&B and technology. ... Maybe now jaded listeners will look beyond Roney’s association with Miles Davis and appreciate him for his own ideas". The Observer's Dave Gelly said, "This CD uses elements of hip hop, electronics and even turntables without sacrificing the immediacy and individuality of jazz performance. His playing has a poise and assurance that few can match, while his band supports him admirably".

== Track listing ==
All compositions by Wallace Roney except where noted

1. "Cyberspace" (Ronnie Burrage) – 7:48
2. "Shadow Dance" – 10:37
3. "Prototype" (André Benjamin) – 6:13
4. "Then and Now" (Antoine Roney) – 4:49
5. "Let's Stay Together" (Al Green, Willie Mitchell, Al Jackson Jr.) – 4:59
6. "Quadrant" – 6:18
7. "Three Views of the Blues" – 5:19
8. "Secret Identity" (Adam Holzman) – 7:36

== Personnel ==
- Wallace Roney – trumpet
- Antoine Roney – soprano saxophone, tenor saxophone (tracks 1–4 & 6–8)
- Don Byron – bass clarinet (track 2)
- Clifton Anderson – trombone (track 2)
- Geri Allen – piano, Fender Rhodes piano (tracks 2–7)
- Adam Holzman – keyboards, Fender Rhodes piano, piano (tracks 1, 2 & 6–8)
- Matthew Garrison – double bass, electric bass
- Eric Allen – drums
- DJ Logic – turntables (tracks 1, 6 & 7)
