= Blue Dawn-Blue Nights =

Studio album by Wallace Roney
- Released: August 30, 2019
- Recorded: September & December, 2018
- Venue: Van Gelder, Englewood Cliffs, New Jersey
- Genre: Jazz
- Length: 53:23
- Label: HighNote; HCD 7318
- Producer: Wallace Roney

Wallace Roney chronology
A Place in Time (2016)	Blue Dawn-Blue Nights (2019)

Blue Dawn-Blue Nights is the final studio album by trumpeter/composer Wallace Roney, released on the HighNote label in 2019.

== Reception ==
Professional ratings
Review scores
Source	Rating
Allmusic	4/5 stars

AllMusic's Matt Collar said, "Blue Dawn-Blue Nights, finds the trumpeter collaborating with a cadre of young lions and balancing dusky after-hours warmth and propulsive post-bop modalism. ... Somewhat of a departure from Roney's past work, Blue Dawn-Blue Nights features songs written by his bandmates, along with a handful of deftly curated covers. The result is a surprisingly cohesive album that benefits from each player's unique yet clearly like-minded point-of-view". JazzTimes reviewer Mike Joyce stated, "Given what we’ve long known about his remarkable artistry and output, is it any wonder that Wallace Roney’s latest CD is worth acquiring for its deep soulfulness alone? On this outing the trumpeter delivers the goods upfront, ... Even so, you won’t find Roney lingering in the spotlight for long here. He and drummer Lenny White, who appears on four tracks, seem more interested in guiding the ensemble than leading it, allowing plenty of space for a rotating lineup".

== Track listing ==
1. "Bookendz" (Wallace Roney) – 6:13
2. "Why Should There Be Stars" (Bryce Rohde, Kaye Dunham) – 5:28
3. "Wolfbane" – 7:54
4. "New Breed" (Dave Liebman) – 8:13
5. "Don't Stop Me Now" (Steve Lukather, David Paich) – 7:05
6. "A Dark Room" (Oscar Williams II) – 9:00
7. "Venus Rising" (Emilio Modeste) – 5:15
8. "Elliptical" (Modeste) – 4:15

== Personnel ==
- Wallace Roney – trumpet
- Emilio Modeste – tenor saxophone, soprano saxophone
- Oscar Williams II – piano
- Paul Cuffari – bass
- Kojo Odu Roney (tracks 4 & 6–8), Lenny White (tracks 1–3 & 5) – drums
- Quintin Zoto – guitar (tracks 1, 3 & 5)
