= Mistérios =

Studio album by Wallace Roney
- Released: 1994
- Recorded: 1994
- Studio: Power Station (New York City); Hit Factory (New York City)
- Genre: Jazz
- Length: 58:54
- Label: Warner Bros. 9 45641
- Producer: Teo Macero, Matt Pierson, Gordon Meltzer

Wallace Roney chronology
A Tribute to Miles (1994)	Mistérios (1994)	The Wallace Roney Quintet (1996)

Mistérios is an album by American jazz trumpeter Wallace Roney, recorded in 1994 and released on the Warner Bros. label.

== Reception ==
Professional ratings
Review scores
Source	Rating
AllMusic	4/5 stars

The AllMusic review by Scott Yanow stated: "Trumpeter Wallace Roney avoids the standard repertoire altogether on this CD, ... but, try as hard as he may, he still sounds like Miles Davis every time he hits a long tone or plays a doubletime passage. Backed by a small orchestra that mostly interprets Gil Goldstein arrangements, Roney is the main soloist throughout this interesting ballad-dominated set".

In The Washington Post, Geoffrey Himes wrote: "Not only was this recording supervised by Davis's old producer, Teo Macero, but it features Evans-like orchestral arrangements by Gil Goldstein, who had transcribed and adapted Evans's charts for Miles Davis & Quincy Jones Live at Montreux ... Because Roney emphasizes feeling over technique, Misterios has the chance to connect with a non-jazz audience as few acoustic jazz albums have since Davis's heyday".

In JazzTimes, David R. Adler noted: "Misterios, his debut for the label, is in many respects a marvelous piece of work—with jazz ensemble and strings interpreting works by Pat Metheny, Jaco Pastorius, Egberto Gismonti and, bizarrely enough, Dolly Parton. The label wanted a cover of a Grammy-winning song, and Roney averted a potential disaster, turning “I Will Always Love You,” the Parton-penned Whitney Houston hit, into a thing of enigmatic beauty, an unabashed valentine to his departed friend and mentor, Miles Davis".

== Track listing ==
1. "Meu Menino" (Danilo Caymmi, Ana Terra) – 6:15
2. "In Her Family" (Pat Metheny) – 4:47
3. "Michelle" (John Lennon, Paul McCartney) – 6:31
4. "Cafe" (Egberto Gismonti) – 6:28
5. "Mistérios" (Joyce, Mauricio Maestro) – 4:52
6. "Last to Know" (Metheny) – 6:47
7. "Memoria e Fado" (Gismonti) – 5:16
8. "71+" (Jaco Pastorius) – 6:51
9. "Muerte" (Astor Piazzolla) – 5:48
10. "I Will Always Love You" (Dolly Parton) – 5:19

== Personnel ==
- Wallace Roney – trumpet, arranger
- Gil Goldstein – conductor, keyboards, arranger
- Geri Allen – piano, arranger
- Clarence Seay – double bass
- Eric Allen – drums
- Steve Berrios – percussion
- Steve Thornton – percussion
- Valtinho Anastacio – percussion
- Antoine Roney – tenor saxophone (tracks 4, 6, 8)
- Ravi Coltrane – tenor saxophone (track 9)
- Orchestra:
  - Eric Wyrick (concertmaster), Liang-Ping How, Sandra Park – violin
  - Louise Schulman, Maureen Gallagher – viola
  - Eugene J. Moye Jr., Richard Locker – cello
  - Andrew Sterman, Chris Hunter, Harvey Estrin, Lawrence Feldman, Robert Steen – flute, recorder
