= Carlos Martins (musician) =

Portuguese musician and composer

- Born: December 23, 1961 (age 64); Grândola, Portugal
- Origin: Portugal
- Genres: Jazz, contemporary music, world music
- Occupations: saxophonist, composer, artistic director
- Instrument: Saxophone
- Years active: 1980s–present

Carlos Martins (born 23 December 1961) is a Portuguese saxophonist, jazz musician and composer. He is known for his artistic works, compositions and collaborations in contemporary music, jazz and world music, both in Portugal and abroad as well as his conceptual works as artistic director and producer.

== Biography ==
Carlos Martins was born on 23 December 1961 in Grândola, Portugal. He studied contemporary music, composition and saxophone in Lisbon, Barcelona and New York City. He was teaching at the Conservatório Nacional de Lisboa as well as the Jazz School Hot Clube de Portugal in Lisbon and at the New Jersey Performing Arts Center.

He founded some of the most important Portuguese jazz groups and performed at a number of national and international festivals.

He looks back on numerous collaborations with both Portuguese artists from different disciplines like Bernardo Sassetti, Maria João, Rui Horta as well as international acclaimed artists such as Cindy Blackman and George Garzone.

He released seven albums of his own music as band leader, some of them awarded as the best national jazz records in Portugal and appeared on plenty of others as musician.

Apart from his own compositions, he composed for films, theatre plays and dance and has contributed to a number of interdisciplinary projects.

== Style ==
His saxophone sound indicates references to American jazz musicians such as John Coltrane or Sonny Rollins, and European jazz musicians including Jan Garbarek, but his music is deeply rooted in the Mediterranean and lusophone music culture.

His style is influenced by different elements, coming as well from the Mediterranean music, especially the Portuguese traditional music, like Fado or Canto Alentejano, but also from other lusophone areas e.g. Brazil, Cape Verde and Mozambique.

== Work as artistic director ==
In 1996 he founded the Sons da Lusofonia, a project in which artists from the lusophone world collaborate for a better citizenship. Since 2002 he is artistic director of the Portuguese national jazz festival, Festa do Jazz, and, since 2006, the artistic director of Lisboa Mistura, an intercultural festival with a focus on new cultural tendencies and innovative formats. Apart from his artistic work he is socially engaged in different educational projects and is consulting in urban studies.

== Discography ==
- 2014 - Absence

Carlos Martins Quartet with Carlos Barreto, Mário Delgado, Alexandre Frazão

- 2008 - Agua

Carlos Martins Quintet with Bernardo Sassetti, Carlos Barreto, Mário Delgado, Alexandre Frazão

- 2006 - Do Outro Lado

Carlos Martins Quintet with Bernardo Sassetti, Carlos Barreto, Mário Delgado, Alexandre Frazão, with Orchestra

- 1999 - Sempre Carlos Martins Quintet with Bernardo Sassetti, Carlos Barreto, Mário Delgado, Alexandre Frazão
- 1998 - Caminho Longe Orchestra Sons da Lusofonia, directed by Carlos Martins
- 1997 - Outras Indias Carlos Martins and Vasco Martins
- 1996 - Passagem Carlos Martins Quartet
- 1991 - Cem Caminhos Quinteto de Maria João
- 1983 - Maria João, Quinteto Maria João
