= Cindy Blackman Santana =

American drummer

Cindy Blackman
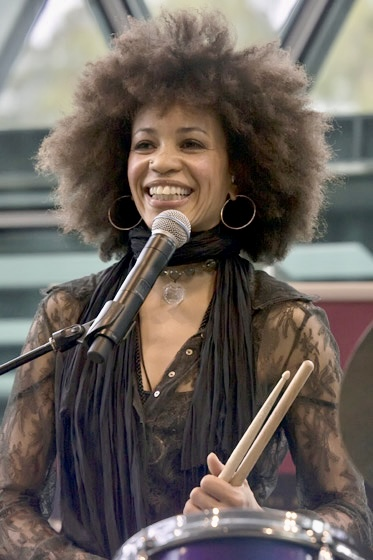
- Blackman performing in May 2008

Background information
- Born: November 18, 1959 (age 67); Yellow Springs, Ohio, U.S.
- Genres: Jazz; Latin rock
- Occupations: Musician; bandleader
- Instruments: Drums; percussion
- Years active: 1980s–present
- Labels: Muse; HighNote; Sacred Sounds
- Spouse: Carlos Santana (m. 2010)
- Website: cindyblackmansantana.com

Cindy Blackman Santana (née Blackman; born November 18, 1959) is an American jazz and rock drummer. Beginning in the 1980s, she has recorded several jazz albums as a bandleader and has performed with Pharoah Sanders, Sonny Simmons, Ron Carter, Sam Rivers, Cassandra Wilson, Angela Bofill, Buckethead, Bill Laswell, Lenny Kravitz, Joe Henderson, Joss Stone and her husband Carlos Santana.

== Early life and education ==
Blackman was born November 18, 1959, in Yellow Springs, Ohio. Her mother and grandmother were classical musicians and her uncle was a vibist. As a child, her mother took her to classical concerts.

Blackman's introduction to the drums happened at the age of seven in Yellow Springs. At a pool party at a friend's house, she saw a drum set and began playing. "Just looking at them struck something in my core, and it was completely right from the second I saw them," says Blackman. "And then, when I hit them, it was like, wow, that's me." Soon after, Blackman began playing in the school band and persuaded her parents to get her toy drums.

When Blackman was 11, she moved to Bristol, Connecticut, where she attended the Hartt School of Music in Hartford. Blackman began to have an interest in jazz at age 13 after listening to Max Roach and got her first professional drum set at 14.

Blackman then attended the Berklee College of Music in Boston, where she studied with Alan Dawson, who had also taught Tony Williams, an inspiration for Blackman. While she was at Berklee, a friend recommended her for a gig with The Drifters, so Blackman left college after three semesters and moved to New York City in 1982.

== Career ==
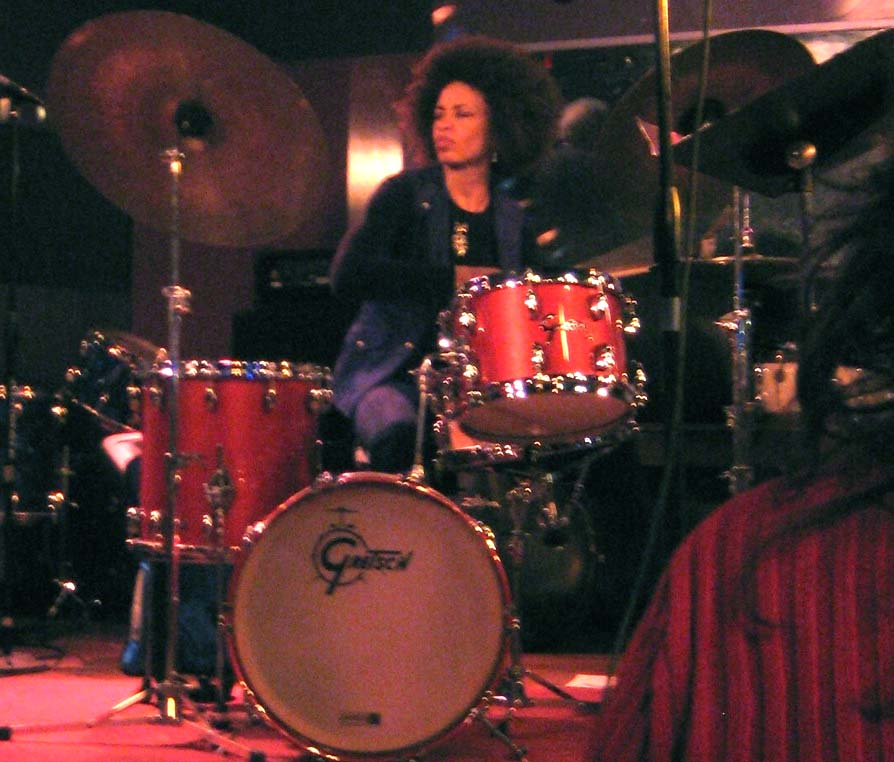
Blackman performing at Iridium Jazz Club in New York City in December 2007

In New York City, Blackman worked as a performer but also attended shows to listen to others play. Art Blakey became a significant influence. Blackman said, "he really was like a father to me. I learned a lot just watching him. I asked him a lot of questions about the drums and music – and he answered all of them."

In 1984, Blackman was showcased on Ted Curson's Jazz Stars of the Future on WKCR-FM in New York. In 1987, Blackman's first compositions appeared on Wallace Roney's Verses album. In 1988 Blackman released Arcane on Muse Records, her debut as a bandleader. Her band included Wallace Roney on trumpet, Kenny Garrett on alto saxophone, Joe Henderson on tenor saxophone, Buster Williams and Clarence Seay on bass, and Larry Willis on piano.

=== Work with Lenny Kravitz ===
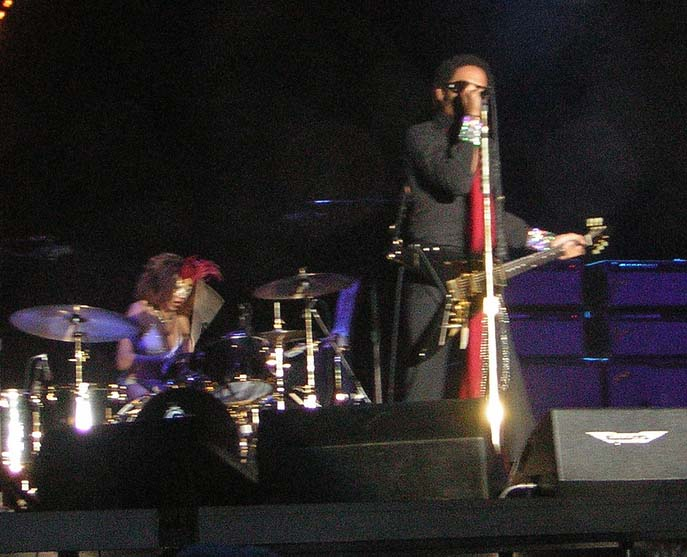
Blackman performing with Lenny Kravitz in Chile in March 2005

In 1993, Blackman had an opportunity to work with Lenny Kravitz. From New York, Blackman talked over the phone with Kravitz in Los Angeles, and played drums for him as he listened. Kravitz immediately asked Blackman to fly out to LA. She stayed for two weeks including shooting the video for "Are You Gonna Go My Way". She would go on to have an 18-year run as Kravitz's touring drummer.

=== Solo career ===
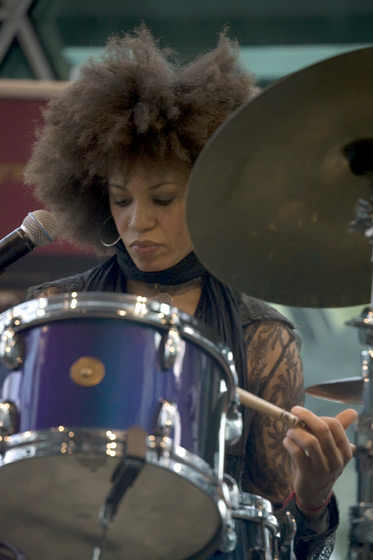
Blackman performing at Federation Square in Melbourne, Australia, in May 2008

In the late 1990s, Blackman made her first recording with a working group. They called the album Telepathy because of the tight communication in the band. Blackman and her band also recorded the instructional video Multiplicity.

In 2004, Blackman took a break from touring with Lenny Kravitz to focus on her own music. That year, she released Music for the New Millennium on her Sacred Sounds Label. "We experiment – but it's never free. Everything is written out. I have charts for all the songs. We expand on what's there, and stretch harmonics and note choices".

In September 2007, she made a tour of South America, teaching clinics in Argentina, Chile, and Brazil, and on November 30, 2007, Blackman and her quartet performed at Art After 5 at the Philadelphia Museum of Art.

In 2010, she released a first tribute album to her inspiration Tony Williams. Another Lifetime featured Mike Stern on guitar and organist Doug Carn following the line-up of the original Tony Williams Lifetime. As guest musicians appear Joe Lovano, Patrice Rushen and Vernon Reid. Reid is the lead guitarist on the second Williams tribute album Spectrum Road (2012), a collaboration between Blackman, Reid, John Medeski on organ and former bassist of Lifetime and Cream Jack Bruce. Bruce also sings on three tracks of the album and Blackman lends her voice to "Where", originally written by (then Lifetime guitarist) John McLaughlin and sung by Williams (Emergency!, 1969), which already appeared on Another Lifetime in an instrumental version. She appeared at the 2011 Montreux Jazz Festival in Switzerland, where she played drums for husband Carlos's one-off reunion with John McLaughlin, after which she helped mix the sound for the video.

In 2020, she released a 17 track album titled Give the Drummer Some. On this album, she sings on 11 of the tracks. The album includes performances by John McLaughlin, Matthew Garrison, Vernon Reid, Kirk Hammett, Bill Ortiz, and Neal Evans.

== Personal life ==
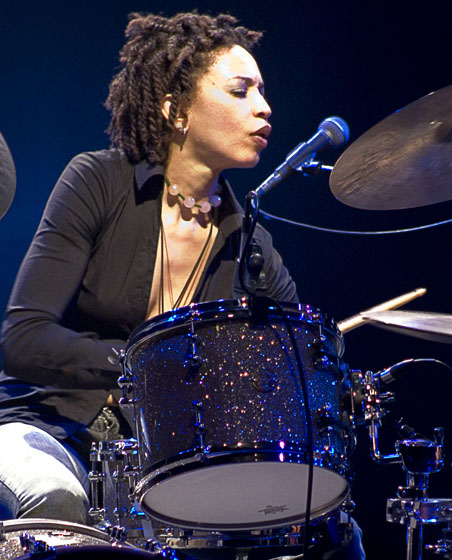
Blackman performing at Sesc Pompéia in São Paulo, Brazil, in August 2007

On July 9, 2010, Carlos Santana proposed to Blackman on stage during a concert at Tinley Park, Illinois. Blackman is Santana's touring drummer; he proposed immediately after her drum solo. They were married in Maui, Hawaii on December 19, 2010.

Blackman attended a Baptist church during her teenage years, but became a follower of the Baháʼí Faith at the age of 18; she also started studying Kabbalah in the 2000s. Blackman cultivates spirituality in her musicianship. "I believe that music is so sacred that once you're playing music you are doing the work of prayer, whether you're conscious of it or not, because you have a focused intent," says Blackman.

Blackman is a rarity as a female jazz percussionist. "In the past, there were a lot of stigmas attached to women playing certain instruments," Blackman says. "Any woman, or anyone facing race prejudice, weight prejudice, hair prejudice ... if you let somebody stop you because of their opinions, then the only thing you're doing is hurting yourself. I don't want to give somebody that power over me."

== Discography ==
=== As leader ===
- Arcane with Wallace Roney, Joe Henderson, Kenny Garrett, Larry Willis, Buster Williams, Clarence Seay (Muse, 1987)
- Code Red with Steve Coleman, Wallace Roney, Kenny Barron, Lonnie Plaxico (Muse, 1990 [1992])
- Telepathy with Antoine Roney, Jacky Terrasson, Clarence Seay (Muse, 1992 [1994])
- The Oracle with Gary Bartz, Kenny Barron, Ron Carter (Muse, 1996)
- In the Now with Ravi Coltrane, Jacky Terrasson, Ron Carter (HighNote, 1998)
- Works on Canvas with J. D. Allen III (tenor sax), Carlton Holmes (keyboards), George Mitchell (bass) (HighNote, 1999)
- A Lil' Somethin' Somethin' – The Best of the Muse Years (compilation, 32 Jazz, 2000)
- Someday... with Allen, Holmes, Mitchell (HighNote, 2001)
- Music for the New Millennium with Allen, Holmes, Mitchell (Sacred Sound, 2004)
- Another Lifetime with Mike Stern and Doug Carn featuring guests Joe Lovano, Vernon Reid, Patrice Rushen, Benny Rietveld and David Santos (4 Q, 2010)
- Give the Drummer Some (Present Future, 2020)
- Coherence (Present Future, 2026)

=== As co-leader or sidewoman ===
With Eddie Allen

- Summer Days (Enja, 2000)

With Bootsy Collins and Fantaazma

- "Funk Not Fight" (Bootzilla Records, 2023)

With Santi Debriano and David Fiuczynski

- Trio + Two featuring Greg Osby and Jerry González (Free Lance, 1991)

With Melinda Doolittle

- Coming Back to You (Hi Fi, 2009)

With Kali Z. Fasteau and William Parker

- An Alternative Universe (Flying Note, 2011)

With Russell Gunn

- Love Requiem (HighNote, 1999)

With The Isley Brothers and Santana

- Power of Peace (Sony Legacy, 2017)

With Rodney Kendrick

- The Colors of Rhythm (Impulse!, 2014)

With Lenny Kravitz

- 5 (Virgin, 1998) (track 5)

With Greg Lewis

- Organ Monk (Greg Lewis Music, 2010)

With Carlos Martins

- Passagem (Enja, 1996)

With Wallace Roney

- Intuition (Muse, 1988)
- The Standard Bearer (Muse, 1989)
- Obsession (Muse, 1990)

With Santana

- Corazón (RCA, 2014)
- Corazón: Live from México - Live It to Believe It (RCA, 2014)
- Power of Peace (2017)
- Africa Speaks (2019)
- In Search of Mona Lisa (2019)
- Blessings and Miracles (2021)
- Sentient (2025)

With Carlos Santana and John McLaughlin

- Live at Montreux 2011: Invitation to Illumination (DVD) (Eagle Rock, 2015)

With Saxemble

- Saxemble (Qwest, 1996)

With Sonny Simmons

- American Jungle (Qwest, 1997)

With Spectrum Road (Jack Bruce, Vernon Reid, John Medeski, Blackman Santana)

- Spectrum Road (Palmetto, 2012)

With Mike Stern

- Big Neighborhood (Heads Up, 2009)

With Joss Stone

- The Soul Sessions (S-Curve, 2003)
- Mind Body & Soul (S-Curve, 2004)

With Alicyn Yaffee

- Someone Else (Madman Junkyard / Little Green Butterfly, 2016)

With various artists

- Black Night – Deep Purple Tribute According to New York with TM Stevens, Stevie Salas, Corey Glover, Richie Kotzen (Revolver, 1997)
