= Telepathy (Cindy Blackman album) =

Studio album by Cindy Blackman
- Released: 1994
- Recorded: September 18, 1992
- Studios: Van Gelder Studio, Englewood Cliffs, New Jersey
- Genre: Jazz
- Length: 50:25
- Labels: Muse, MCD 5437
- Producers: Cindy Blackman, Don Sickler

Cindy Blackman chronology
Code Red (1990)	Telepathy (1994)	The Oracle (1996)

Telepathy is an album by drummer Cindy Blackman, recorded in 1992 and released on the Muse label.

== Reception ==
Professional ratings
Review scores
Source	Rating
AllMusic	4/5 stars
The Rolling Stone Jazz & Blues Album Guide	3/5 stars

Ron Wynn of AllMusic stated, "Drummer Cindy Blackman's third Muse album shows a maturity, confidence, and assertiveness that her two previous sessions lacked. ... While hard bop as well as some funk tinges are present, Cindy Blackman shows signs of being much more than another neo-bop follower on this date".

Ted Panken, writing for The Rolling Stone Jazz & Blues Album Guide, noted that the album "features more textural drumming from Blackman than on... earlier sessions," and commented: "This is interesting material that would have benefited from more assertive improvisations by her talented but inexperienced cohorts."

== Track listing ==
All compositions by Cindy Blackman except where noted

1. "Reves Electriques du Matin (Electric Dreams in the Morning)" – 2:04
2. "Spank" – 8:05
3. "Telepathy" – 4:30
4. "Well, You Needn't" (Thelonious Monk) – 6:05
5. "Missing You" – 5:32
6. "Clubhouse" (Jacky Terrasson) – 6:00
7. "Reves Electriques de l'Apres Midi (Electric Dreams in the Afternoon)" – 1:09
8. "Jardin Secret" – 6:40
9. "Persuasion" – 5:23
10. "Tune-Up" (Miles Davis) – 3:26
11. "Reves Electriques de Minuit (Electric Dreams in the Evening)" – 1:31

== Personnel ==
- Cindy Blackman - drums
- Antoine Roney - soprano saxophone, tenor saxophone
- Jacky Terrasson - piano
- Clarence Seay - bass
