= Understanding (Wallace Roney album) =

Studio album by Wallace Roney
- Released: April 23, 2013
- Recorded: June 18 & July 5, 2012
- Venue: Samurai Hotel, Astoria, New York
- Genre: Jazz
- Length: 61:33
- Label: HighNote; HCD 7235
- Producer: Wallace Roney

Wallace Roney chronology
Home (2012)	Understanding (2013)	A Place in Time (2016)

Understanding is an album by trumpeter/composer Wallace Roney, recorded in 2012 and released on the HighNote label the following year.

== Reception ==
Professional ratings
Review scores
Source	Rating
AllMusic	4/5 stars
Financial Times	3/5 stars

AllMusic's Matt Collar said "Understanding, is an expansive, often swinging work that finds the trumpeter digging even deeper into the straight-ahead if no less adventurous sound of his recent releases. These are bluesy, harmonically layered modal songs that bring to mind such touchstones as '70s Woody Shaw and late-'60s Miles Davis". Financial Times reviewer Mike Hobart stated, "The ex-Miles Davis understudy confirms he is now something of an elder statesman with this sextet recording featuring young unknowns who are full of promise". In JazzTimes, Michael J. West noted "Roney was a dyed-in-the-wool Young Lion. Understanding, a sextet session and his first all-acoustic album in over a decade, places him back in that context, with (mostly) wondrous results ... Technical virtuosity, dense harmony and zealous swing abound. At its best, melody abounds too".

== Track listing ==
1. "Understanding" (Roy Brooks) – 6:56
2. "Is That So?" (Duke Pearson) – 5:47
3. "Search for Peace" (McCoy Tyner) – 8:07
4. "Gaslight" (Pearson) – 6:51
5. "Red Lantern" (Arnold Lee) – 7:43
6. "Kotra" (Ben Solomon) – 7:08
7. "Combustible" (Wallace Roney) – 8:21
8. "You Taught My Heart to Sing" (Tyner) – 8:01

== Personnel ==
- Wallace Roney – trumpet
- Arnold Lee – alto saxophone (tracks 2–7)
- Ben Solomon – tenor saxophone (tracks 1, 2 & 4–8)
- Victor Gould (tracks 2, 3 & 5–8), Eden Ladin (tracks 1 & 4) – piano
- Daryl Johns – bass
- Kush Abadey – drums
