= Jazz (Wallace Roney album) =

Studio album by Wallace Roney
- Released: July 31, 2007
- Recorded: March 12–13, 2007
- Studio: Knoop Studios, River Edge, New Jersey
- Genre: Jazz
- Length: 65:02
- Label: HighNote Records
- Producer: Wallace Roney

Wallace Roney chronology
| Mystikal (2005) | Jazz (2007) | If Only for One Night (2010) |

Professional ratings
Review scores
| Source | Rating |
|---|---|
| AllMusic | 4.5/5 stars |

Jazz is an album by jazz artist Wallace Roney released in 2007.

== Track listing ==
1. "Vater Time" (W. Roney) – 8:52
2. "Children of the Light" (A. Roney) – 5:22
3. "Inflorescent" (R. Carter) – 6:29
4. "Fela's Shine" (E. Allen/W. Roney) – 4:59
5. "Nia" (A. Roney) – 9:18
6. "Revolution: Resolution" (W. Roney) – 5:29
7. "Her Story" (W. Roney) – 5:46
8. "Stand" (S. Stone) – 10:58
9. "Un Poco Loco" (B. Powell) – 7:49

== Personnel ==
- Wallace Roney – trumpet
- Antoine Roney – soprano sax, tenor sax, bass clarinet
- Geri Allen – piano, keyboards (tracks 2, 3, 5–9)
- Robert Irving III – keyboards, Fender Rhodes (tracks 1, 4, 6, 8)
- Rashaan Carter – bass
- Eric Allen – drums, percussion
- DJ Axum – turntables (tracks 1, 4)
- Val Jeanty – turntables (tracks 5, 6, 8)
