= Music for the New Millennium =

Studio album by Cindy Blackman
- Released: 2004
- Studios: The Music Palace Studio, West Hempstead, New York
- Genre: Jazz
- Length: 93:01
- Labels: Sacred Sound Records, 99936
- Producer: Cindy Blackman

Cindy Blackman chronology
Someday... (2001)	Music for the New Millennium (2004)	Another Lifetime (2010)

Music for the New Millennium is a two-CD album by drummer Cindy Blackman. It was recorded at The Music Palace Studio in West Hempstead, New York, and was released in 2004 by Sacred Sound Records. On the album, Blackman is joined by saxophonist J. D. Allen, keyboardist Carlton Holmes, and bassist George Mitchell. The album is dedicated to the memory of Blackman's grandmother Martha Blackman-Higby.

== Reception ==
Professional ratings
Review scores
Source	Rating
All About Jazz	4.5/5 stars
All About Jazz	4/5 stars
AllMusic	3.5/5 stars
The Penguin Guide to Jazz	3/4 stars

In a review for AllMusic, Ken Dryden wrote: "Blackman leans a bit toward fusion without entirely giving up her more mainstream roots... Blackman obviously wanted to expand her musical horizons, but only time will tell if she remains with this instrumentation or returns to her roots."

In a review for All About Jazz, Mark F. Turner called the album "thoroughly engaging," and stated: "Touching mainstream swing, urban grooves and progressive music, this is a fine showing for Blackman's skills and band that pushes the edges yet remains accessible... A stupendous and inspiring release." AAJ's Troy Collins commented: "A welcome return to her jazz roots, Music For The New Millennium is a powerful and passionate effort from one of the finest drummers on the scene. It's good to have her back."

Writing for Jazz Times, Bill Milkowski remarked: "Blackman comes out hitting hard in the tradition of her role model Tony Williams and barely lets up on her muscular attack throughout the course of this throbbing two-CD set. Maybe being out on tour with Lennie Kravitz for so long, holding her jazz chops in check, made Blackman so pent-up that she just had to record this material or explode."

== Track listing ==
"Letter To Theo" and "Sam Pei" composed by J. D. Allen. "Theme to Ginger's Rise" composed by Carlton Holmes. "I Come to the Garden Alone" composed by C. Austin Miles. Remaining tracks by Cindy Blackman.

=== Disc 1 ===
1. "Abracadabra" – 4:25
2. "Seven" – 5:26
3. "Insight (Past Wisdom)" – 4:52
4. "Letter to Theo" – 6:27
5. "Black Town (for Harlem)" – 8:29
6. "Insight (Right Now)" – 2:50
7. "For Wayne (Shorter That Is)" – 6:36
8. "The Infinite (for My Grandmother)" – 4:11
9. "The One (for God)" – 4:55

=== Disc 2 ===
1. "Sam Pei" – 4:27
2. "The Drums and Me" – 1:59
3. "Stars in Eyes" – 7:57
4. "Insight (from My Father)" – 2:32
5. "Theme to Ginger's Rise" – 8:44
6. "All I Want" – 4:45
7. "Insight (from My Mother)" – 5:47
8. "Insight (the Future)" – 7:18
9. "I Come to the Garden Alone (As Played by Martha Blackman-Higby)" – 1:16

== Personnel ==
- Cindy Blackman – drums
- J. D. Allen – tenor saxophone
- Carlton Holmes – electric piano, synthesizer
- George Mitchell – bass
