= Arcane (album) =

Studio album by Cindy Blackman
- Released: 1988
- Recorded: August 8 and December 23, 1987
- Studios: Van Gelder Studio, Englewood Cliffs, New Jersey
- Genre: Jazz
- Length: 49:21
- Labels: Muse, MR 5341
- Producers: Joe Fields, Don Sickler

Cindy Blackman chronology
Arcane (1988)	Code Red (1990)

Arcane is the debut studio album led by drummer Cindy Blackman which was recorded in 1987 and released on the Muse label.

== Reception ==
Professional ratings
Review scores
Source	Rating
AllMusic	2.5/5 stars
The Penguin Guide to Jazz	2/4 stars
The Rolling Stone Jazz & Blues Album Guide	2.5/5 stars
The Virgin Encyclopedia of Jazz	3/5 stars

Scott Yanow of AllMusic stated, "Cindy Blackman's debut as a leader finds the talented drummer showing a great deal of confidence and holding her own with her illustrious sidemen ... The music is modern hard bop, and all of the musicians play up to par in their concise solos ... A strong start to Cindy Blackman's productive recording career".

== Track listing ==
All compositions by Cindy Blackman except where noted

1. "Arcane" – 5:12
2. "Late Autumn" – 5:45
3. "Dual Force" – 6:32
4. "Incindyary (Drum Solo)" – 4:32
5. "Teeter Totter" (Joe Henderson) – 7:11
6. "Mirrored Glances" – 5:36
7. "Deceptacon" (Buster Williams) – 6:39
8. "The Awakening" – 7:07 Additional track on CD reissue

== Personnel ==
- Cindy Blackman - drums
- Wallace Roney - trumpet (tracks 1–3 & 5–8)
- Kenny Garrett - alto saxophone (tracks 1, 3, 6 & 7)
- Joe Henderson - tenor saxophone (tracks 2, 5 & 8)
- Larry Willis - piano (tracks 1–3 & 5–8)
- Buster Williams (tracks 1, 3, 6 & 7), Clarence Seay (tracks 2, 5 & 8) - bass
