= Obsession (Wallace Roney album) =

Studio album by Wallace Roney
- Released: 1991
- Recorded: September 7, 1990
- Studio: Van Gelder Studio, Englewood Cliffs, NJ
- Genre: Jazz
- Length: 42:25
- Label: Muse; MCD 5423
- Producer: Joe Fields

Wallace Roney chronology
| The Standard Bearer (1989) | Obsession (1991) | Seth Air (1991) |

Obsession is the fourth album by American jazz trumpeter Wallace Roney which was recorded in 1990 and released on the Muse label early the following year.

== Reception ==
Professional ratings
Review scores
| Source | Rating |
|---|---|
| AllMusic | 3.5/5 stars |

The AllMusic review by Ken Dryden stated, "In the early days of his career, trumpeter Wallace Roney was tagged as being yet another Miles Davis-influenced player, though a focused hearing of his fourth CD as a leader will demonstrate how much he was developing his own voice on this exciting hard bop session ... An enjoyable early effort".

== Track listing ==
All compositions by Wallace Roney except where noted

1. "Obsession" − 6:09
2. "Scenario One" (Cindy Blackman) − 7:58
3. "Alone Together" (Arthur Schwartz, Howard Dietz) − 8:53
4. "Seven" − 7:27
5. "Black Moon" (Christian McBride) − 7:37
6. "Donna Lee" (Charlie Parker) − 4:21

== Personnel ==
- Wallace Roney − trumpet
- Gary Thomas − tenor saxophone, flute
- Donald Brown − piano
- Christian McBride − bass
- Cindy Blackman − drums
