= Seth Air =

Studio album by Wallace Roney
- Released: 1991
- Recorded: September 28, 1991
- Studio: Van Gelder Studio, Englewood Cliffs, NJ
- Genre: Jazz
- Length: 52:19
- Label: Muse; MCD 5441
- Producer: Don Sickler

Wallace Roney chronology
| Obsession (1990) | Seth Air (1991) | Munchin' (1993) |

Seth Air is the fifth album by American jazz trumpeter Wallace Roney which was recorded in 1991 and released on the Muse label.

== Reception ==
Professional ratings
Review scores
| Source | Rating |
|---|---|
| AllMusic | 4/5 stars |

The AllMusic review by Scott Yanow stated, "Trumpeter Wallace Roney, 32 at the time of this recording, has yet to escape from the shadow of Miles Davis. However he is one of the stronger brassmen in jazz of the 1990s and plays quite well on this set ... The music is straightahead but occasionally as unpredictable as the repertoire".

== Track listing ==
All compositions by Antoine Roney except where noted

1. "Melchizedek" − 7:30
2. "A Breath of Seth Air" − 6:58
3. "Black People Suffering" − 6:35
4. "28, Rue Pigalle" − 5:47
5. "Lost" (Jacky Terrasson) − 3:48
6. "People" (Jule Styne, Bob Merrill) − 8:26
7. "Gone" (George Gershwin, Ira Gershwin, DuBose Heyward) − 6:28
8. "Wives and Lovers" (Burt Bacharach, Hal David) − 6:47

== Personnel ==
- Wallace Roney − trumpet
- Antoine Roney − tenor saxophone
- Jacky Terrasson − piano
- Peter Washington − bass
- Eric Allen − drums
