= Someday... (album) =

Studio album by Cindy Blackman
- Released: 2001
- Recorded: April 27, 2000
- Studios: Sound on Sound Recording, New York City
- Genre: Jazz
- Length: 57:21
- Labels: HighNote, HCD 7063
- Producer: Cindy Blackman

Cindy Blackman chronology
Works on Canvas (2000)	Someday... (2001)	Music for the New Millennium (2004)

Someday... is an album by drummer Cindy Blackman. It was recorded at Sound on Sound Recording in New York City on April 27, 2000, and was released in 2001 by HighNote Records. On the album, Blackman is joined by saxophonist J. D. Allen, keyboardist Carlton Holmes, and bassist George Mitchell.

== Reception ==
Professional ratings
Review scores
Source	Rating
AllMusic	4/5 stars
The Penguin Guide to Jazz	3/4 stars

In a review for AllMusic, Scott Yanow wrote: "These are post-bop explorations, often rather dark in mood and giving all four musicians opportunities to set the direction and to interact with each other. The result is an album of high-quality modern jazz."

A reviewer for All About Jazz stated: "Someday... puts Blackman into another light as a band leader who may now be really hitting her stride. This is after all, undoubtedly her most prescient and cohesive recording to date. It is a strong conceptual record with a very consistent aesthetic at play and moreover, one which does not fail to create some memorable moods... there is not a lot of hesitation here in giving this record an unqualified endorsement."

Bill Shoemaker, writing for Jazz Times, commented: "You know when players are stepping up as leaders when they use the tradition as a means, not the end-all. Cindy Blackman does just that on Someday..., a program that liberally taps the Miles Davis book, but with a couple of pungent twists."

== Track listing ==
1. "My Funny Valentine" (Richard Rodgers, Lorenz Hart) – 4:52
2. "Call to the Ancestors (1st Interlude)" (Cindy Blackman) – 1:13
3. "Someday My Prince Will Come" (Frank Churchill, Larry Morey) – 5:46
4. "Walkin'" (Jimmy Mundy, Richard Carpenter) – 4:20
5. "Heaven Sent" (Cindy Blackman) – 7:03
6. "Call to the Ancestors (2nd Interlude)" (Cindy Blackman) – 1:22
7. "Eternal Justice" (Carlton Holmes) – 10:32
8. "Peebow's Vibe" (J. D. Allen) – 3:34
9. "Glass Slippers" (J. D. Allen) – 6:12
10. "Paradise Island" (Cindy Blackman) – 8:30
11. "Call to the Ancestors (Main Theme)" (Cindy Blackman) – 4:05

== Personnel ==
- Cindy Blackman – drums
- J. D. Allen – tenor saxophone
- Carlton Holmes – piano, keyboards
- George Mitchell – bass
