= Munchin' =

Studio album by Wallace Roney
- Released: 1993
- Recorded: June 6, 1993
- Studio: Van Gelder Studio, Englewood Cliffs, NJ
- Genre: Jazz
- Length: 57:58
- Label: Muse; MCD 5533
- Producer: Joe Fields

Wallace Roney chronology
Seth Air (1991)	Munchin' (1993)	Crunchin' (1993)

Munchin' is an album by American jazz trumpeter Wallace Roney which was recorded in 1993 and released on the Muse label.

== Reception ==
Professional ratings
Review scores
Source	Rating
AllMusic	4/5 stars

The AllMusic review by Ken Dryden stated, "Wallace Roney is clearly shaking the comparisons to Miles Davis, even while covering some of the same ground as the late jazz legend. ... This is easily one of Wallace Roney's best".

== Track listing ==
1. "Solar" (Miles Davis) − 8:56
2. "Ah-Leu-Cha" (Charlie Parker) − 6:11
3. "Bemsha Swing" (Thelonious Monk, Denzil Best) − 7:38
4. "Lost" (Wayne Shorter) − 6:09
5. "Daahoud" (Clifford Brown) − 6:05
6. "Whims of Chambers" (Paul Chambers) − 7:22
7. "Smooch" (Davis, Charles Mingus) − 8:02
8. "Love for Sale" (Cole Porter) − 7:35

== Personnel ==
- Wallace Roney − trumpet
- Ravi Coltrane − tenor saxophone (tracks 1–3, 5 & 8)
- Geri Allen − piano
- Christian McBride − bass
- Kenny Washington − drums
