= If Only for One Night (Wallace Roney album) =

Live album by Wallace Roney
- Released: April 20, 2010
- Recorded: July 30 – August 2, 2009
- Venue: Iridium Jazz Club, New York City
- Genre: Jazz
- Length: 61:33
- Label: HighNote; HCD 7202
- Producer: Wallace Roney, Dawn Jones

Wallace Roney chronology
Jazz (2007)	If Only for One Night (2010)	Home (2012)

If Only for One Night is a live album by trumpeter/composer Wallace Roney, recorded at the Iridium in New York City in 2009 and released on the HighNote label the following year.

== Reception ==
Professional ratings
Review scores
Source	Rating
AllMusic	3.5/5 stars
Financial Times	4/5 stars
The Guardian	4/5 stars

AllMusic's Michael G. Nastos said, "Retro-fusion and funk à la latter period Miles Davis with hard-swinging jazz and some pop-type ballads comprise this meaty and beaty session full of energetic highs and introspective low-key music. ... A diverse and enjoyable set, overdue for Roney in a club or concert setting, it shows he's a strong player with plenty of ideas in the tank based in tribute to his idol Davis". Financial Times reviewer Mike Hobart stated, "Roney is a forceful and atmospheric trumpeter, stretching out in sympathetic company, his rounded tone perfectly captured by this live club recording". In The Guardian, John Fordham noted, "Plenty of trumpeters play Miles's notes, and get close to his sound – but Roney goes deeper, because he also shares the uncanny timing and dramatic instincts, and the vision to conceive a moment-to-moment improvised solo as a narrative whole". PopMatters' Will Layman wrote: "Throughout this set, the band is inventive and powerful, even if they seem to be searching for a clear identity. In being able to play anything (at least anything Davis-inspired), the band loses itself a bit. Roney seems most himself on the final track, a solo trumpet essay for his son, where he sheds the Miles sound somewhat and hints at his classical studies".

== Track listing ==
All compositions by Wallace Roney except where noted

1. "Quadrant" – 11:34
2. "If Only for One Night" (Brenda Russell) – 5:48
3. "Only with You" (Tony Williams) – 5:48
4. "I Have a Dream" (Herbie Hancock) – 10:31
5. "Metropolis" – 8:33
6. "Let's Wait Awhile" (James Harris III, Terry Lewis, Janet Jackson, Melanie Andrews) – 7:50
7. "I Love What We Make Together" (Attala Zane Giles) – 6:40
8. "FMS" – 5:09

== Personnel ==
- Wallace Roney – trumpet
- Antoine Roney – soprano saxophone, tenor saxophone, bass clarinet
- Aruán Ortiz – keyboards
- Rashaan Carter – bass
- Kush Abadey – drums
