= Verses (album) =

Studio album by Wallace Roney
- Released: 1987
- Recorded: February 19, 1987
- Studio: Van Gelder, Englewood Cliffs, NJ
- Genre: Jazz
- Length: 45:30
- Label: Muse; MR 5335
- Producer: Michael Cuscuna, Tony Williams

Wallace Roney chronology
Verses (1987)	Intuition (1988)

Verses is the debut album by American jazz trumpeter Wallace Roney, recorded in 1987 and released on the Muse label.

== Reception ==
Professional ratings
Review scores
Source	Rating
AllMusic	4/5 stars
Los Angeles Times	3/5 stars

The Los Angeles Times said that Roney's "muted solo on Bill Evans' 'Blue in Green' and his infectious explorations on a blues called 'Float' show where he is heading."

The AllMusic review by Scott Yanow stated, "The music is essentially advanced hard bop, with Roney as usual often sounding a bit tonewise like his hero Miles Davis".

== Track listing ==
1. "Float" (Cindy Blackman) − 5:43
2. "Verses" (Wallace Roney) − 9:37
3. "Blue in Green" (Bill Evans) − 5:39
4. "Topaz" (Blackman) − 5:37
5. "Lawra" (Tony Williams) − 6:36
6. "Slaves" (Roney) − 12:18

== Personnel ==
- Wallace Roney − trumpet
- Gary Thomas − tenor saxophone
- Mulgrew Miller − piano
- Charnett Moffett − bass
- Tony Williams − drums
