= Antoine Roney =

American jazz saxophonist (born 1963)

Antoine Roney (born April 1, 1963, in Philadelphia, Pennsylvania) is an American tenor saxophonist, brother to trumpeter Wallace Roney.

He attended the Duke Ellington School of the Arts and the Hartt School of Music of the University of Hartford.

His first album, The Traveler, was recorded in 1992 and released by Muse Records. Some of the tracks were with pianist Jacky Terrasson, bassist Dwayne Burno, and drummer Louis Hayes; saxophonist and flautist James Spaulding was added for the other tracks. "After a few years of extensive touring, Roney issued his sophomore recording, Whirling, in 1996."

== Discography ==
=== As leader ===
- 1992: The Traveler (Muse) with James Spaulding, Jacky Terrasson, Dwayne Burno, Louis Hayes
- 1995: Whirling (Muse) with Ronnie Mathews, Santi Debriano, Nasheet Waits

=== As sideman ===
With Cindy Blackman

- Telepathy (Muse, 1992 [1994])

With Ricky Ford

- Tenor Madness Too! (Muse, 1992)

With Elvin Jones

- The Truth: Heard Live at the Blue Note (Half Note, 1999)

With Wallace Roney

- Seth Air (Muse, 1991)
- Mistérios (Warner Bros., 1994)
- Village (Warner Bros., 1997)
- No Room for Argument (Stretch, 2000)
- Prototype (HighNote, 2004)
- Mystikal (HighNote, 2005)
- Jazz (HighNote, 2007)
- If Only for One Night (HighNote, 2010)
- Home (HighNote, 2012)
