= Val Jeanty =

Haitian electronic musician

Val Jeanty (Val-Inc)
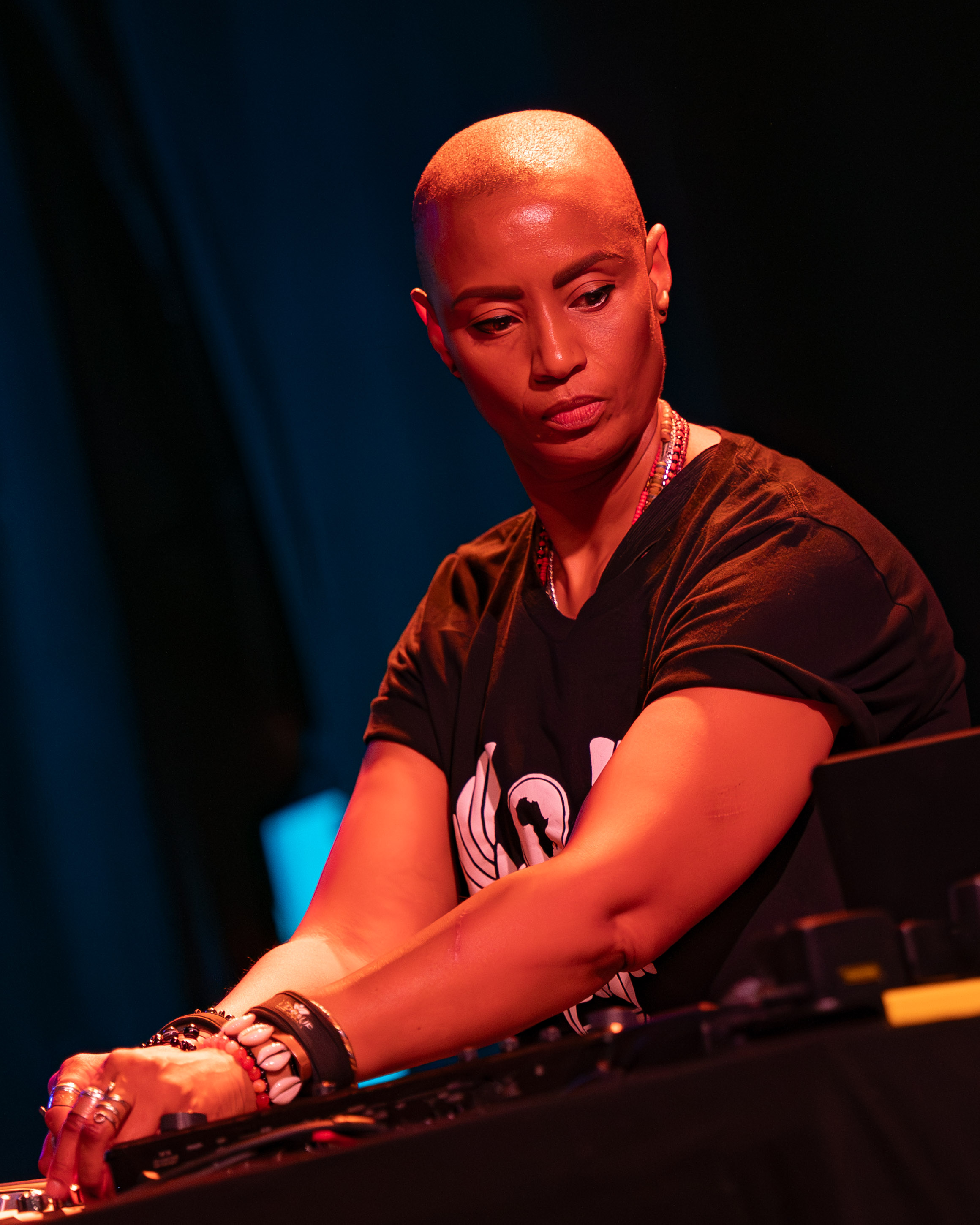
- Jeanty at Kongsberg Jazzfestival 2024

Background information
- Also known as: Val-Inc.
- Origin: Port-au-Prince, Haiti
- Genres: Afro-Electronica, electro-vodou, electronica, avant-garde
- Occupations: turntablist, percussionist, professor, music producer
- Years active: 1998 - present
- Label: Innova
- Website: https://soundcloud.com/vjeanty

Val Jeanty, also known as Val-Inc, is a Haitian electronic music composer, turntablist, and professor at Berklee College of Music. She incorporates African Haitian musical traditions into her work, combining acoustics with electronics. Jeanty works in the electronic music subgenre Afro-Electronica or "Vodou-Electro".

== Early years ==
Jeanty is the great-grandniece of Haitian composer, pianist, and music director Occide Jeanty and granddaughter of GranMe Choune mambo (Vodou priestess). Growing up in the Bizoton & Fontamara districts of Carrefour, Haiti, Jeanty attended Sacré Cœur. Jeanty left Haiti for the United States in 1986, when upheaval following the overthrow of then-president Jean-Claude Duvalier led to school closures.

== Career ==
Jeanty issued her first album in 2000 thanks to a Van Lier Fellowship, and has performed at the Whitney Museum, the Museum of Modern Art, and internationally at music festivals in Austria and Switzerland. Jeanty's installations have been showcased in New York City at the Whitney Museum, the Museum of Modern Art, the Brooklyn Academy of Music, the Village Vanguard and internationally at Saalfelden Music Festival in Austria, Stanser Musiktage in Switzerland, Jazz à la Villette in France, and the Biennale Di Venezia in Italy.

Poet Tracie Morris chose Jeanty as the sound engineer for her 2002 poetry installation at the Whitney Biennial. Morris and Jeanty worked in Jeanty's home studio, even recording the poems in a vestibule between two rooms.

In 2011, Jeanty was commissioned by Wesleyan University's Center for the arts to collaborate with Dr. Gina Athena Ulysse on Fascinating! Her resilience, a multimedia performance exploring the meanings assigned to the word "resilience" in Western conceptualizations of Haitians after the earthquake of January 2010.

Jeanty speaks about the relationship between sound and spirituality in the 2012 documentary film The United States of Hoodoo.

In 2014, Jeanty collaborated with Afro-Cuban Saxophonist Yosvany Terry on his album New Throned King (5Passion), contributing samplings of vodou ceremonies. The same year, she was also sound designer for the National Black Theater's Facing Our Truth: 10-Minute Plays on Trayvon, Race and Privilege.

Jeanty's most recent work is with Turning Jewels Into Water, a duo with Indian-born Ravish Momin. With influences including Vodou, Indian folk music, jazz, and electronica, Turning Jewels Into Water has been said to "actively decentre shallow, Westernized understandings of 'world' music", and their 2019 debut Map of Absences called "a place where the ritualistic origins of music and rhythm meet with the digital realm." Turning Jewels Into Water was also awarded a 2020 New Music USA grant. Their newest work, Our Reflection Adorned by Newly Formed Stars, was completed after the start of the pandemic, with the duo recording and sharing files at a distance.

== Discography ==
=== As leader ===
Release year	Title	Label	Personnel Notes
2008	On	Tellus Media / Innova	
2018	Which Way Is Home? (EP)	FPE Records	Turning Jewels Into Water (duo with Ravish Momin)
2019	Map of Absences	FPE Records	Turning Jewels Into Water
2020	Our Reflection Adorned by Newly Formed Stars	FPE Records	Turning Jewels Into Water
2021	Fodder	Fonograf Editions	Douglas Kearney and Val Jeanty
2025	KāFOU	ZakaMizik/Unself	KāFOU

=== As sideperson ===
Release year	Artist / Band	Title	Label	Catalog
2005	Wallace Roney	Mystikal	HighNote	HCD 7145
2007	Wallace Roney	Jazz	HighNote	HCD 7174
2014	Yosvany Terry	New Throned King	5Passion	SP-025
2015	Terri Lyne Carrington	The Mosaic Project: Love And Soul	Concord Records	CRE-37779-02
2019	Kris Davis	Diatom Ribbons	Pyroclastic Records	PR06

=== As writer/arranger ===
Release year	Title	Label	Catalog	Band/Personnel
2005	No Room For Argument	Stretch Records	SCD-9033-2	Wallace Roney
2007	John P. Parker: Viewed from 9 Dimensions	Tricky Dilemma	4077	Tricky Dilemma

=== As sound engineer ===
Release year	Title	Label	Catalog	Band/Personnel
2000	No Room For Argument	Stretch Records	SCD-9033-2	Wallace Roney
2002	Whitney Biennial 2002	Whitney Museum Of American Art	ISBN 0-8109-6832-0	Various
2004	Saturn, Conjunct the Grand Canyon in a Sweet Embrace	Pi Recordings	PI10	Wadada Leo Smith & Anthony Braxton
2006	Zodiac Suite: Revisited	Mary Records	M104	The Mary Lou Williams Collective with Geri Allen, Buster Williams, Billy Hart, Andrew Cyrille
2017	This Is Beautiful Because We Are Beautiful People	ESP-Disk	ESP 5011	TOXIC Mat Walerian Matthew Shipp William Parker
