= Another Lifetime (album) =

Studio album by Cindy Blackman
- Released: February 23, 2010
- Recorded: 2005–2009
- Studio: various
- Genre: Jazz fusion
- Length: 55:01
- Labels: 4Q (Four Quarters Entertainment), FQT-CD-1820
- Producer: Cindy Blackman

Cindy Blackman chronology
Music for the New Millennium (2004)	Another Lifetime (2010)	Give the Drummer Some (2020)

Another Lifetime is an album by drummer Cindy Blackman. It was recorded at various locations during 2005–2009, and was released in 2010 by the 4Q label. On the album, which pays homage to the jazz fusion band The Tony Williams Lifetime, Blackman is joined by guitarists Fionn O Lochlainn, Mike Stern, and Vernon Reid, saxophonist Joe Lovano, keyboard players Doug Carn, Patrice Rushen, and Carlton Holmes, and bassists Benny Rietveld and David Santos.

== Reception ==
Professional ratings
Review scores
Source	Rating
All About Jazz	4/5 stars
All About Jazz	3.5/5 stars
All About Jazz	4/5 stars
AllMusic	4/5 stars
The Guardian	4/5 stars

In a review for AllMusic, Michael G. Nastos wrote: "This homage to Tony Williams comes straight from the heart, unfiltered and exploding with the absolute dynamism both drummers have always displayed. What is even better -- this sounds very updated and not so retro as one might assume, a feather in the cap of the always formidable and substantive Cindy Blackman."

Jeff Winbush of All About Jazz stated: "Putting aside preconceived notions of what Tony Williams' Lifetime might sound like in 2010, Blackman's sonic explorations take jazz-rock beyond where the late drummer envisioned it... If Another Lifetime doesn't quite herald the second coming of the jazz-rock movement... it does prove there is quite a bit of vitality left in it and Blackman is well-positioned to lead its rebirth." AAJ's Jerry D'Souza wrote that Blackman "has always been a tasteful drummer. Never obtrusive, she strikes the right combination of dynamics, harmony, and accent. At home both in jazz and rock, this is the perfect vehicle for her." AAJ's Terrell Kent Holmes remarked: "While all of these performances are standouts, it's Blackman's powerful, relentless drumming that's the driving force."

The Guardian's John Fordham called the album a "firebreathing session," and commented: "The mad-axeman guitar and boneshaking drumming this style invites is certainly present on Another Lifetime, but Blackman balances it with tonal splashes of abstract colour."

Writing for A Jazz Noise, Dave Foxall noted: "Multiple musicians on a single album can impair consistency however, in this instance they seem to impart a freshness as well as appropriately reflecting Tony Williams' changing lineups... All of which contrives to create a cohesive diversity that makes for an engaging and uplifting (and often loud) listen."

Greg Burk of MetalJazz.com remarked: "Blackman doesn't attempt time travel so much as personal reflection, drawing from hunks of Williams material... overall, she's done justice to her inspiration."

== Track listing ==
1. "Vashkar" (Carla Bley) – 6:28
2. "Where" (John McLaughlin) – 8:56
3. "Beyond Games" (Tony Williams) – 5:35
4. "Vashkar Reprise" (Carla Bley) – 3:06
5. "40 Years of Innovation" (Carlton Holmes, Cindy Blackman, Fionn O Lochlainn) – 1:04
6. "The Game Theory" (Benny Rietveld, Cindy Blackman, Doug Carn, Mike Stern) – 1:50
7. "Vashkar - The Alternate Dimension Theory" (Carla Bley) – 7:41
8. "Love Song" (Tony Williams) – 7:33
9. "And Heaven Welcomed a King" (Benny Rietveld, Cindy Blackman, Doug Carn, Mike Stern) – 3:52
10. "There Comes a Time" (Tony Williams) – 4:05
11. "Wildlife" (Tony Williams) – 4:57
- Tracks 1–4, 6, 7, and 9 were recorded at Studio E in Brooklyn, New York, on March 23 and 24, 2007. Tracks 5 and 10 were recorded at Studio E in Brooklyn, New York, during October 9–11, 2005. Track 8 was recorded at Greene Street Studio in New York City on January 8, 2008. Track 11 was recorded at HardDrive Studios in North Hollywood, California, on August 29, 2009.

== Personnel ==
- Cindy Blackman – drums, vocals
- Fionn O Lochlainn – guitar (tracks 5 and 10)
- Mike Stern – guitar (tracks 1–4, 6, 7, and 9)
- Vernon Reid – guitar (track 11)
- Joe Lovano – tenor saxophone (track 8)
- Doug Carn – organ (tracks 1–4, 6, 7, and 9)
- Patrice Rushen – electric piano, synthesizer (track 11)
- Carlton Holmes – synthesizer (tracks 5 and 10)
- Benny Rietveld – bass (tracks 1–4, 6, 7, and 9)
- David Santos – bass (track 11)
