= Wallace Roney =

American jazz trumpeter (1960–2020)

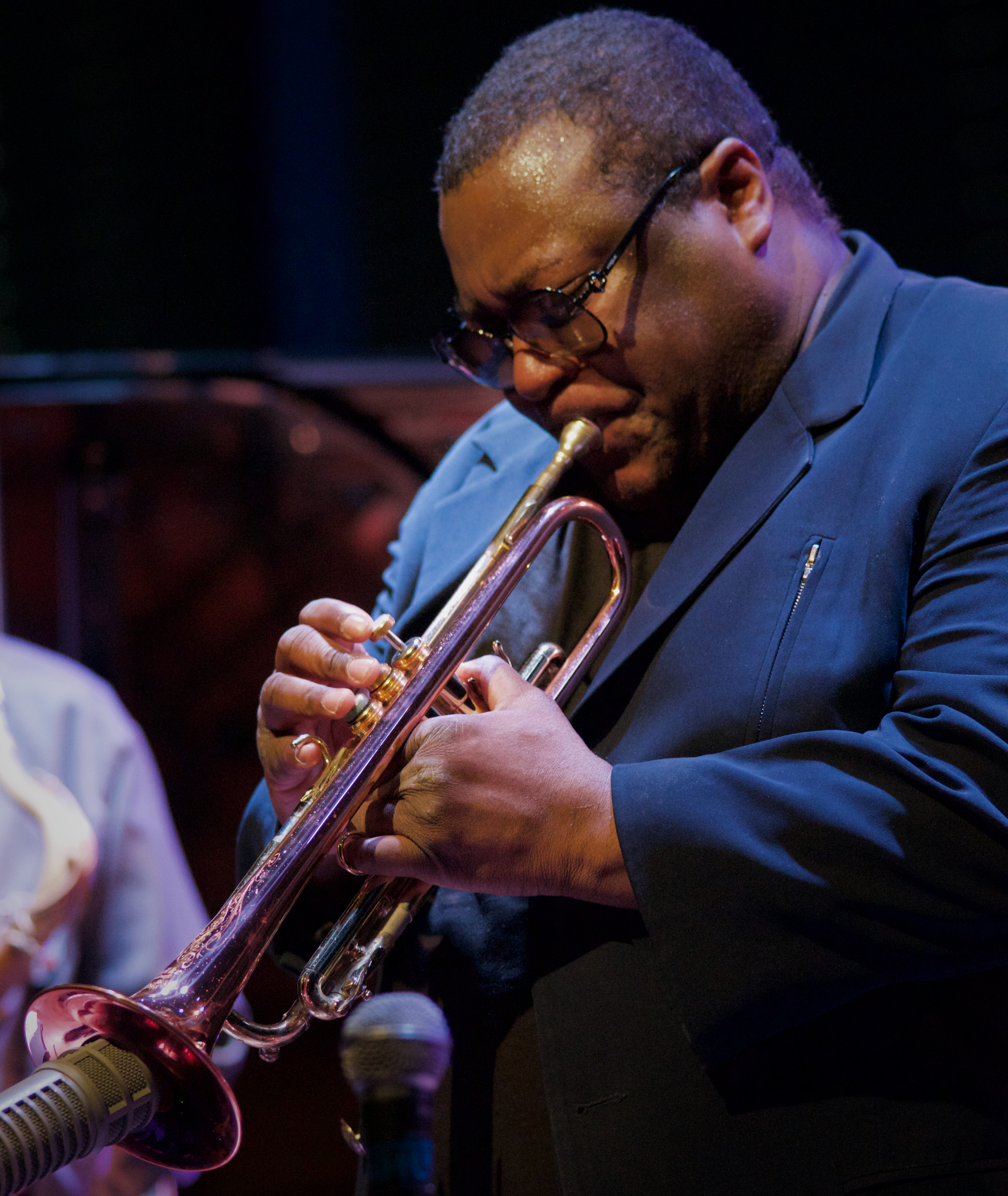
- Roney in 2015

Background information
- Born: May 25, 1960; Philadelphia, Pennsylvania, U.S.
- Died: March 31, 2020 (aged 59) Paterson, New Jersey, U.S.
- Genre: Jazz
- Occupation: Musician
- Instrument: Trumpet
- Years active: 1975–2020
- Website: www.wallaceroney.com
- Education: Howard University; Berklee College of Music
- Spouse: Geri Allen (m. 1995; div. 2008)
- Partner: Dawn Felice Jones

Wallace Roney (May 25, 1960 – March 31, 2020) was an American jazz (hard bop and post-bop) trumpeter. He won one Grammy award and was nominated twice.

Roney took lessons from Clark Terry and Dizzy Gillespie and studied with Miles Davis from 1985 until the latter's death in 1991. Wallace credited Davis as having helped to challenge and shape his creative approach to life as well as being his music instructor, mentor, and friend; he was the only trumpet player Davis personally mentored.

== Early life and education ==
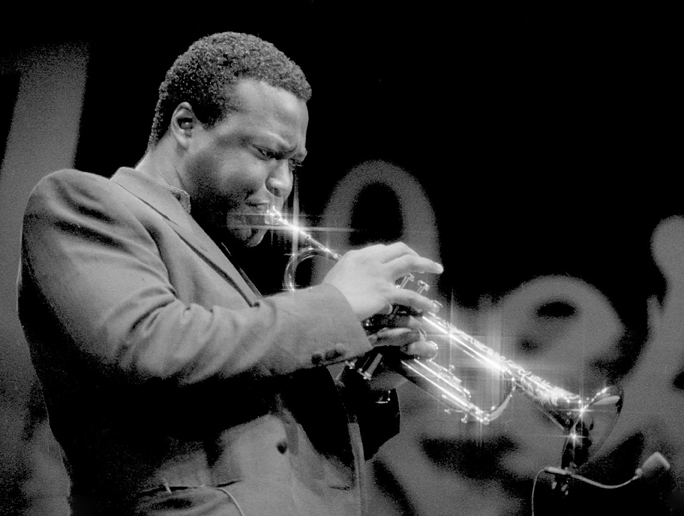
Wallace Roney at Monterey Jazz Festival 9/92

Roney was born in Philadelphia. He studied at Howard University and Berklee College of Music in Boston, Massachusetts, after graduating from the Duke Ellington School of the Arts of the D. C. Public Schools, where he learned trumpet with Langston Fitzgerald of the Baltimore Symphony Orchestra. Found to have perfect pitch at the age of four, Wallace began his musical and trumpet studies at Philadelphia's Settlement School of Music.

He studied with trumpeter Sigmund Hering of the Philadelphia Orchestra for three years. Hering regularly presented Wallace at recitals at the Settlement School, and with the Philadelphia Brass Ensemble, during his studies in Philadelphia.

== Career ==
When he entered the Duke Ellington School, Roney had already made his recording debut at age 15 with Nation and Haki R. Madhubuti, and at that time met, among others, Bill Hardman, Valery Ponomarev, Woody Shaw (who befriended him), Johnny Coles and Freddie Hubbard. He played with the Cedar Walton Quartet featuring Billy Higgins, Sam Jones, and Philly Joe Jones at 16 years of age with the encouragement of his high school teacher.

Roney attained distinction as a gifted local performer in the Washington, D.C., area. In 1979 and 1980, Roney won the DownBeat Award for Best Young Jazz Musician of the Year, and in 1989 and 1990 the DownBeat Magazine's Critic's Poll for Best Trumpeter to Watch.

In 1983, while taking part in a tribute to Miles Davis at "The Bottom Line" in Manhattan, he met his idol. "He [Davis] asked me what kind of trumpet I had," Roney told Time magazine, "and I told him none. So he gave me one of his." In 1984 and 1985, he was forced to play in Latin dance and reception bands, as the New York clubs, once a prominent part of the jazz scene, had mostly disappeared. But in 1986, he received a pair of calls, in the same month, to tour with drummers Tony Williams and Art Blakey, after which Roney became one of the most in-demand trumpet players on the professional circuit.

In 1986, he succeeded Terence Blanchard in Blakey's Jazz Messengers. In the late 1980s and early 1990s, he was an integral part of Williams's quintet. In 1991, Roney played with Davis at the Montreux Jazz Festival. After Davis's death that year, Roney toured in memoriam with Davis alumni Wayne Shorter, Herbie Hancock, Ron Carter and Tony Williams and recorded an album, A Tribute to Miles, for which they won a Grammy Award.

Roney learned his craft directly from Miles Davis. Critics have taken Roney to task for sounding too similar to his idol. Roney recorded his debut album as a leader, Verses, on Muse Records in 1987. A number of albums on Muse, Warner Bros. Records and Concord Records/Stretch Records followed, and by the time he turned 40 in 2000 Roney had been documented on over 250 audio recordings. His album titles from the 2000s include Mystikal (2005) and Jazz (2007) on HighNote Records. His two most recent albums are A Place in Time (HighNote 2016) and Blue Dawn - Blue Nights (HighNote 2019), which features his nephew, drummer Kojo Roney.

== Personal life ==
Wallace Roney was the son of Wallace Roney, U.S. Marshal and President of the American Federation of Government Employees Local 102, grandson of Philadelphia musician Roosevelt Sherman, and older brother of tenor and soprano saxophonist Antoine Roney. In 1995, Roney married pianist Geri Allen, with whom he had two daughters and a son. The marriage ended prior to Allen's death in 2017. The two artists collaborated on records on many occasions during the 1990s and 2000s, on records released under each artist's name.

Earlier in his life, Roney had been a resident of Montclair, New Jersey.

== Death ==
Wallace Roney died at the age of 59 on March 31, 2020, at St. Joseph's University Medical Center in Paterson, New Jersey. The cause was complications arising from COVID-19.

== Movie credits ==
- 2001 - The Visit - Jordan Walker-Perlman - music arrangement
- 1996 - Love Jones - music arrangement

== Discography ==
=== As leader/co-leader ===
| Recording date | Title | Label | Year released | Notes |
|---|---|---|---|---|
| 1987-02 | Verses | Muse | 1987 | |
| 1988-01 | Intuition | Muse | 1988 | |
| 1989-03 | The Standard Bearer | Muse | 1989 | |
| 1989-05 | What's New | Nippon Crown | 1989 | |
| 1990-09 | Obsession | Muse | 1991 | |
| 1991-09 | Seth Air | Muse | 1991 | |
| 1993-06 | Munchin' | Muse | 1993 | |
| 1993-07 | Crunchin' | Muse | 1993 | |
| 1994 | Mistérios | Warner Bros. | 1994 | Arranged and conducted by Gil Goldstein |
| 1995-02 | The Wallace Roney Quintet | Warner Bros. | 1996 | |
| 1996-12 | Village | Warner Bros. | 1997 | |
| 2000-03, 2000-04 | No Room for Argument | Stretch | 2000 | |
| 2004-02 | Prototype | HighNote | 2004 | |
| 2005-05 | Mystikal | HighNote | 2005 | |
| 2007-03 | Jazz | HighNote | 2007 | |
| 2009-07, 2009-08 | If Only for One Night | HighNote | 2010 | |
| 2010-11 | Home | HighNote | 2012 | |
| 2012-06, 2012-07 | Understanding | HighNote | 2013 | |
| 2016-06 | A Place in Time | HighNot | 2016 | |
| 2018-09, 2018-12 | Blue Dawn-Blue Nights | HighNote | 2019 | |

Collaboration
With Herbie Hancock, Wayne Shorter, Tony Williams and Ron Carter

- A Tribute to Miles (Qwest/Reprise/Warner Bros., 1994) – rec. 1992, 1994

Compilation

- No Job Too Big or Small (32 Jazz, 2003) – Muse recordings

=== As a member ===
Superblue

- Superblue 2 (Blue Note, 1990) – rec. 1989

=== As sideman ===
With Geri Allen

- Maroons (Blue Note, 1992)
- Eyes in the Back of Your Head (Blue Note, 1997) – rec. 1995–1996
- The Gathering (Verve, 1998)
- Timeless Portraits and Dreams (Telarc, 2006)

With Cindy Blackman

- Arcane (Muse, 1988) – rec. 1987
- Code Red (Muse, 1992) – rec. 1990

With Art Blakey

- Killer Joe with George Kawaguchi (Union Jazz, 1982) – rec. 1981
- Art Blakey And Jazz Messengers ("San Marco Cafe", Miami, FL, January 11, 1986) (Arco 3, 1990) – live rec. 1986
- Feeling Good (Delos, 1986)

With Chick Corea

- Remembering Bud Powell (Stretch, 1997) – rec. 1996
- The Musician (Concord Jazz, 2017)[3CD]

With Vincent Herring

- Evidence (Landmark, 1991) – rec. 1990
- Dawnbird (Landmark, 1993) – rec. 1991–1992
- Simple Pleasure (HighNote, 2001)

With Tony Williams

- Civilization (Blue Note, 1987) – rec. 1986
- Angel Street (Blue Note, 1988)
- Native Heart (Blue Note, 1990) – rec. 1989
- Tokyo Live (Blue Note, 1993)[2CD] – live rec. 1992

With others

- Kenny Barron, What If? (Enja, 1986)
- Samuel Blaser, Early in the Mornin' (OutNote, 2018)
- Donald Brown, Born to be Blue (Space Time, 2013)
- Terri Lyne Carrington, Jazz Is a Spirit (ACT, 2002)
- Joey DeFrancesco, Where Were You? (Columbia, 1990)
- Miles Davis and Quincy Jones, Miles & Quincy Live at Montreux (Warner Bros., 1993)
- Bill Evans, Escape (Escapade Music, 1996)
- Ricky Ford, Interpretations (Muse, 1982)
- Letizia Gambi, Introducing Letizia Gambi (Jando Music|Via Veneto Jazz, 2012)
- Kenny Garrett, Garrett 5 (Paddle Wheel, 1989)
- Dizzy Gillespie, To Diz with Love (Telarc, 1992)
- Helen Merrill, Brownie: Homage to Clifford Brown (Verve, 1994)
- David Murray, Geri Allen, and Terri Lyne Carrington, Perfection (Motéma, 2016)
- Makoto Ozone, Three Wishes (Verve, 1998)
- Powerhouse, In an Ambient Way (Chesky, 2015)
- David Sanborn, Inside (Elektra, 1999)
- Jarmo Savolainen, First Sight (Timeless, 1992)
- James Spaulding, Brilliant Corners (Muse, 1990)
- Joe Louis Walker, Pasa Tiempo (Evidence Music, 2002)
- Randy Weston and Melba Liston, Volcano Blues (Verve, 1993)
- Christopher Hollyday, Christopher Hollyday (BMG, 1989)
