= Do Your Dance! =

Studio album by Kenny Garrett
- Released: July 8, 2016
- Recorded: 2015
- Studio: Sear Sound, New York City
- Genre: Jazz; hip-hop; funk; soul
- Length: 56:41
- Label: Mack Avenue; MAC 1098
- Producer: Kenny Garrett; Donald Brown

Kenny Garrett chronology
Pushing the World Away (2013)	Do Your Dance! (2016)	Sounds from the Ancestors (2021)

Do Your Dance! is a studio album by saxophonist Kenny Garrett, released on July 8, 2016, his fourth for the Mack Avenue label. The album's concept is to encourage and celebrate dance, the many ways music can make you move, or rather, simply expressing yourself in a unique way. Featuring a core quintet of Garrett on saxophone, Vernell Brown Jr. on piano, Corcoran Holt on bass, either Ronald Bruner Jr. or McClenty Hunter on drums, and Rudy Bird on various percussion, the album also sees an appearance of Donald Brown Jr. (the son of producer Donald Brown), also known as "Mista Enz", who raps on two tracks.

== Reception ==
Professional ratings
Review scores
Source	Rating
AllMusic	4/5 stars
The Guardian	3/5 stars
The Irish Times	3/5 stars
Jazzwise	4/5 stars

Matt Collar of AllMusic described the album as having "a lively, organic ensemble sound that lends itself to group interplay even during solos". Music critic and essayist Raul Da Gama wrote: "Throughout the record Garrett takes the music in unexpected directions by varying tempo and rhythm from sliding sophistication to suddenly accelerating everything as he adds layer upon layer of harmonic language, which even includes tastefully introduced dissonance, to cast a burnished glow onto the music." Jazzwise author Kevin Le Gendre described the album's genre, writing: "[it] entails subtle subversions of the vocabularies of swing and post-Trane modalism. [...] Afro-Cuban percussive elements are infused to create something that is not standard latin-jazz, soulful backbeats are deployed to create something that is not soul jazz and the excellent Mista Enz drops rhymes in a setting that is not jazz-rap." Additionally, Patrick Hadfield, writing for UK Jazz News, noted that "Garrett seems to invoke his influences throughout this album: [...] Blakey, with whom Garrett played early in his career... Coltrane in Garrett's saxophone here, and... McCoy Tyner, who coincidentally came from Philadelphia." Finally, JazzTimes's Matt Lohr commented: "The album is also unafraid to tap into more aggressive, confrontational notions of the dance."

== Track listing ==
All tracks are written by Kenny Garrett.

No.	Title	Length
1.	"Philly"	8:05
2.	"Backyard Groove"	6:56
3.	"Wheatgrass Shot (Straight to the Head)"	4:43
4.	"Bossa"	6:22
5.	"Do Your Dance!"	4:57
6.	"Calypso Chant"	4:37
7.	"Waltz (3 Sisters)"	7:23
8.	"Persian Steps"	8:08
9.	"Chasing the Wind"	5:30
Total length:		56:41

== Personnel ==
Musicians

- Kenny Garrett – alto saxophone (1–6, 9), soprano saxophone (7), vocals (6), flute, piano, percussion, shruti box (8)
- Vernell Brown Jr. – piano (1–7, 9), chant (8)
- Corcoran Holt – double bass (1–7, 9)
- Ronald Bruner Jr. (1, 2, 8, 9), McClenty Hunter (3–7) – drums
- Rudy Bird – percussion (3–6)
- Donald "Mista Enz" Brown Jr. – rap (3, 5)

Technical

- Gretchen Valade – executive producer
- Kenny Garrett, Donald Brown – producer
- Will Wakefield – production manager
- Maria Ehrenreich – creative services director, producer
- Greg Calbi – mastering
- James Farber – engineer
- Owen Mulholland – mixing assistant
- Al Pryor – A&R
- Raj Naik – art direction
- Randall Kennedy – creative director
- Jimmy Katz, Dena Katz – photography
