= African Exchange Student =

Studio album by Kenny Garrett
- Released: 1990
- Studio: RCA Studios New York
- Genres: Jazz; post-bop
- Length: 66:50
- Labels: Atlantic; 7567-82156-2
- Producers: Kenny Garrett; Donald Brown

Kenny Garrett chronology
Prisoner of Love (1989)	African Exchange Student (1990)	Black Hope (1992)

African Exchange Student is the fourth studio album by American jazz saxophonist Kenny Garrett, released by Atlantic Records in 1990. It features a core quartet of Garrett on saxophone, Mulgrew Miller on piano, either Charnett Moffett or Ron Carter on double bass, and either Elvin Jones or Tony Reedus on drums, with various others on percussion.

== Reception ==
Professional ratings
Review scores
Source	Rating
AllMusic	4/5 stars
Los Angeles Times	3.5/5 stars

In the AllMusic review by Scott Yanow, he stated that the album was "one of [Garrett's] strongest early sets as a leader", complimenting both the "lighthearted and adventurous" playing of Garrett and the strength of the rhythm section and concluding that "Kenny Garrett justifies the praise that he received from Miles Davis" (Garrett was a member of Davis's group at the time). Zan Stewart, writing for the Los Angeles Times, described it as "modern acoustic, sans-frills stuff worthy of repeated airings ... with ideas and feeling, standing tall in a variety of contexts."

== Track listing ==
All tracks are written by Kenny Garrett except where noted.

No.	Title	Writer(s)	Length
1.	"Ja-Hed" (contrafact of John Coltrane's "Impressions")		5:57
2.	"Mack the Knife"	Kurt Weill; Bertolt Brecht; Marc Blitzstein	8:40
3.	"African Exchange Student"		9:18
4.	"Someday We'll All Be Free"	Donny Hathaway; Edward Howard	5:43
5.	"One World Through"		1:37
6.	"Straight Street"	John Coltrane	4:57
7.	"Shaw"		6:40
8.	"Lullaby of Isfahan"		6:10
9.	"One Finger Snap"	Herbie Hancock	6:15
10.	"Your Country-Ness"		5:27
11.	"Nostradamus"		6:00
Total length:			66:50

== Personnel ==
Musicians

- Kenny Garrett – alto saxophone, flute (3), vocals (3)
- Mulgrew Miller (1–4, 6–11) – piano
- Charnett Moffett (1–4, 6, 9), Ron Carter (5, 7, 8, 11) – double bass
- Elvin Jones (5, 7, 8, 10, 11), Tony Reedus (1–4, 6, 9) – drums
- Rudy Bird (3, 4, 8), Steve Thornton (3, 4), Tito Ocasio (3, 4) – percussion

Technical

- Donald Brown – production
- James Nichols, Patrick Smith – engineer
- Vincent Caro – assistant engineer
- José Rodriquez – mastering
- Larry Freemantle – art direction
- Frank Moscati – photography
