= Sounds from the Ancestors =

Studio album by Kenny Garrett
- Released: August 27, 2021
- Recorded: 2021
- Studio: New Jersey
- Genre: Jazz; post-bop
- Length: 67:37
- Label: Mack Avenue; MAC 1180
- Producer: Kenny Garrett; Donald Brown

Kenny Garrett chronology
Do Your Dance! (2016)	Sounds from the Ancestors (2021)	Who Killed AI? (2024)

Sounds from the Ancestors is a studio album by saxophonist Kenny Garrett, released on August 27, 2021, his fifth for Mack Avenue Records.

The album's second track, "Hargrove", is inspired by and dedicated to John Coltrane's A Love Supreme and trumpeter Roy Hargrove. "Soldiers of the Fields / Soldats des Champs", track six, celebrates the soldiers of Toussaint L'Ouverture, the victors of the Hatian Revolution.

It was ranked one of NPR Music's best albums of 2021.

== Reception ==
Professional ratings
Review scores
Source	Rating
All About Jazz	3.5/5 stars
AllMusic	4.5/5 stars
DownBeat	5/5 stars
Jazzwise	4/5 stars

James Hale of DownBeat stated: "this is a rare artwork that has a clear conceit yet doesn't sound contrived. In addition, Garrett succeeds at combining deep, joyous grooves like "When The Days Were Different," introspective solo piano explorations, and the ecstasy of his freer improvisations without making the album seem like a pastiche of styles." In the AllMusic review, Thom Jurek, describes Garrett's sound, referencing "his hometown including Motown soul, gospel, and its ever-evolving jazz and blues scenes", concluding: "here for the first time, he meditates upon them simultaneously, examining their roots in the music of West Africa and its role in the musical development of France, Cuba, Guadeloupe, and of course, Nigeria." Stuart Nicholson, writing for Jazzwise, spoke positively of the album, commenting, "it's impressive in its lines of input, ranging from Aretha Franklin to Marvin Gaye, from Afro-Cuban jazz to gospel and from R&B to hip hop." Ian Patterson of All About Jazz called it "a highly enjoyable ride from start to finish".

== Track listing ==
All songs are written and arranged by Kenny Garrett except "Hargrove", which includes an interpolation of A Love Supreme by John Coltrane.

No.	Title	Length
1.	"It's Time to Come Home"	9:48
2.	"Hargrove"	5:13
3.	"When the Days Were Different"	8:08
4.	"For Art's Sake"	8:05
5.	"What Was That?"	8:31
6.	"Soldiers of the Fields / Soldats des Champs"	10:55
7.	"Sounds from the Ancestors"	7:10
8.	"It's Time to Come Home (Original)"	9:47
Total length:		67:37

== Personnel ==
Musicians

- Kenny Garrett – alto saxophone (all), vocals (2), electric piano (2, 3, 4, 6), piano intro/outro (7)
- Vernell Brown Jr. – piano (all except 3)
- Corcoran Holt – bass (all)
- Ronald Bruner Jr. – drums (all)
- Rudy Bird – percussion (all), snare (6)
- Jean Baylor – vocals (1)
- Dreiser Durruthy – batá and vocals (1)
- Maurice Brown – trumpet (2)
- Linny Smith, Chris Ashley Anthony, Sheherazade Holman – vocals (2, 3)
- Johnny Mercier – piano & organ (3), Rhodes piano (4)
- Lenny White – snare (6)
- Pedrito Martinez – vocals & congas (7)
- Dwight Trible – vocals (7)
