= Simply Said =

Studio album by Kenny Garrett
- Released: 1999
- Studio: Avatar Studios, New York City; The Hit Factory, New York City; Sony Music Studios, NYC (mixing); Sterling Sound, NYC (mastering)
- Genre: Jazz; post-bop
- Length: 60:56
- Label: Warner Bros. WB 9 47343-2
- Producer: Kenny Garrett

Kenny Garrett chronology
Songbook (1997)	Simply Said (1999)	Happy People (2002)

Simply Said is the ninth studio album by saxophonist Kenny Garrett, released by Warner Bros. Records on June 18, 1999.

== Reception ==
Johnathan Widran of AllMusic wrote, "The concept behind Simply Said ... must have been to further reflect his growth as a songwriter, keeping memorable melodies as the focus while exploring – as the stylistically diverse performer has always done – new exotic, rhythmic possibilities within the jazz framework." Tom Terrell, writing for JazzTimes, stated, "Simply Said is the freshest contempo jazz record you’re gonna hear all year... Garrett resuscitates the genre's ballad-jazzy funk lite cipher with 11 tracks of oxygenated improvisation, melodic/rhythmic nuance and sheer joy of swing. Geoffrey Himes of The Washington Post noted that the album "is much less ambitious but is just as accomplished within its limited scope. The new disc doesn't have the knotty themes and free-wheeling improvisation of the albums that won Garrett comparisons to Wayne Shorter and Ornette Coleman. As the title implies, Simply Said states its attractive melodies and rippling rhythms plainly and never does anything to distort or obscure them."

Professional ratings
Review scores
Source	Rating
AllMusic	4/5 stars

== Track listing ==
All tracks are written by Kenny Garrett except where noted.

No.	Title	Writer(s)	Length
1.	"G.T.D.S." (a.k.a. "Give the Drummer Some")		6:10
2.	"Charlie Brown Goes to South Africa"		6:37
3.	"Delta Bali Blues"		4:54
4.	"Conversation With Hutcherson"		5:36
5.	"Words Can't Express"	Shedrick Mitchell	4:04
6.	"Back Where You Started"		4:29
7.	"Sounds Like Winter"		4:04
8.	"Can I Just Hold Your Hand?"		5:58
9.	"Organized Colors"		9:36
10.	"3rd Quadrant"		6:04
11.	"Simply Said"		3:24
Total length:			60:56

== Personnel ==
Musicians

- Kenny Garrett – alto, soprano, and sopranino saxophones
- Pat Metheny (7, 11) – electric and acoustic guitars
- Mulgrew Miller (10) – piano, vocals
- Shedrick Mitchell – piano, organ
- Nat Reeves – double bass, vocals
- Marcus Miller (1, 7, 11) – electric bass
- Chris Dave – drums
- Jeff "Tain" Watts – drums (10), vocals
- Bashiri Johnson – percussion
- Raymond Harris – vocals

Technical

- Raymond Harris – production manager, tour manager
- Dana Watson – production coordinator
- Joe Ferla – recording, mixing
- Aaron Sprague, Andy Manganello, Rory Romano – assistant engineer
- Greg Calbi – mastering
- Edward C. Arrendell II, Vernon H. Hammond III CFP (at The Management Ark) – management
- Ted Kurland Associates – booking (agency)
- Robin Lynch – art direction
- Andrew Eccles – photography
- Assumpta Clohessy – hair stylist
- Virginia Webster – stylist
