= Garrett 5 =

Studio album by Kenny Garrett
- Released: September 1989
- Recorded: September 21–23, 1988
- Studio: RCA Studios, New York City
- Genre: Jazz; post-bop
- Length: 59:32
- Label: Paddle Wheel; K28P-6494

Kenny Garrett chronology
Introducing Kenny Garrett (1985)	Garrett 5 (1989)	Prisoner of Love (1989)

Professional ratings
Review scores
Source	Rating
AllMusic	3/5 stars

Garrett 5 is the second studio album by American jazz saxophonist Kenny Garrett, released in September 1989 on Paddle Wheel Records. It features a quintet of Garret, trumpeter Wallace Roney, pianist Mullgrew Miller, bassist Charnett Moffett, and drummer Tony Reedus, plus guest musician Rudy Bird on various percussion. Garrett's influences for this album included Elvin Jones and Ron Carter.

== Track listing ==
All tracks are written by Kenny Garrett except where noted.

No.	Title	Writer(s)	Length
1.	"Feeling Good"	Anthony Newley; Leslie Bricusse	6:27
2.	"Little Dixie"		5:23
3.	"But Beautiful"	Jimmy Van Heusen; Johnny Burke	5:06
4.	"Little Melonae"	Jackie McLean	6:35
5.	"Computer 'G'"		6:19
6.	"La Bamba"	Mexican folk song	4:35
7.	"Lee Hall's Blues"		5:39
8.	"Tokyo Tower"		5:59
9.	"Odoriko"		7:15
10.	"United We Waltz"		6:14
Total length:			59:32

== Personnel ==
- Kenny Garrett – alto saxophone
- Wallace Roney – trumpet
- Mulgrew Miller – piano
- Charnett Moffett – bass
- Tony Reedus – drums
- Rudy Bird – percussion (guest)
