= Prisoner of Love (Kenny Garrett album) =

Studio album by Kenny Garrett
- Released: 1989
- Recorded: early 1989
- Studio: Quad Recording Studios, NYC; Grammavision, NYC; 39th Street Music Production, NYC; Sound on Sound Studios, NYC
- Genre: Jazz; fusion
- Length: 42:31
- Label: Atlantic; 7 82046-2
- Producer: Kenny Garrett

Kenny Garrett chronology
Garrett 5 (1989)	Prisoner of Love (1989)	African Exchange Student (1990)

Prisoner of Love is the third studio album by American jazz saxophonist Kenny Garrett, released by Atlantic Records in 1989.

The album was Garrett's first that featured electronic effects in his music, which he had embraced during his time with Miles Davis, who was experimenting with jazz fusion; however, he returned to an all-acoustic ensemble for his next album, African Exchange Student, in 1990.

== Reception ==
Professional ratings
Review scores
Source	Rating
AllMusic	1/5 stars

Scott Yanow, writing for AllMusic, was highly critical of the album, calling it "a surprising dud, especially compared to his later (and near-classic) recordings" and "an unsuccessful attempt to obtain a cross between Grover Washington Jr. and Stanley Turrentine", continuing, that while "Miles Davis ... makes two rare appearances as a sideman, ... his muted ensemble work ... is as forgettable as virtually this entire misfire."

== Track listing ==
All tracks are written by Kenny Garrett except where noted.

No.	Title	Writer(s)	Length
1.	"May I Have This Dance?"		4:20
2.	"Blue Moon"	Richard Rodgers; Lorenz Hart	4:09
3.	"Prisoner of Love"		5:18
4.	"Put a Smile on Your Face"		4:02
5.	"Sayydah's Single File Groove"		5:02
6.	"Big 'Ol Head"		4:52
7.	"Free Mandela"		6:05
8.	"Peace for a Dream"		3:14
9.	"Lift Ev'ry Voice and Sing"		5:29
Total length:			42:31

== Personnel ==
- Kenny Garrett – alto saxophone (1–3, 5, 7–9), soprano saxophone (4, 6), keyboards (1–9), synth-g (1, 2), synth-b (6), percussion (2, 3, 5, 7–9), drums (7), whistle (7)
- Sayydah Garrett – clarinet (4)
- Barrie Lee Hall Jr. (4), Miles Davis (6, 7) – trumpet
- Muhammad Abdul Al-Khabyyr – trombone (4)
- Foley – lead bass (2, 3), guitar (6, 7)
- Darryl Jones – bass (1), electric bass (6)
- Marcus Miller (2, 3), Charnet Moffett (4) – bass
- Ricky Wellman – drums (1–3)
- Dennis Chambers – drums (4), percussion (4)
- Rudy Bird (1, 3, 4, 6, 7), Mino Cinélu (2, 6, 7) – percussion
- Mikel Dean, Mia Dean, Chananja Bryan, Akira Frierson, Myisha Hollaway, Eric Myers, Erin Myers, Mysheerah Durant, Bonnie Bozeman, Katrina Anderson, Duane Thomas, Noel John, Cie Romeo, Akelier Soogrim – vocals (7)
