= Stars & Stripes (Kenny Garrett album) =

Live album (bootleg) by Kenny Garrett Trio
- Released: May 30, 1995
- Recorded: September 1993 in East Germany
- Genre: Jazz; post-bop
- Length: 71:24
- Label: Jazz Door; JD 1259

Professional ratings
Review scores
Source	Rating
AllMusic	2.5/5 stars

Stars & Stripes is a bootleg live album by saxophonist Kenny Garrett in a trio with bassist Charnett Moffett and drummer Brian Blade. It was released unofficially by Jazz Door on May 30, 1995.

In response to the release of the album, Garrett made his 1995 album Triology. He explained in an All About Jazz interview with Dean Nardi, "I wasn't trying to do Triology, ... but when I went to East Germany, someone recorded me trying to record this music for myself to study to see what I wanted to do, and then I was kind of forced to do it. They released a record and it was a bootleg CD called Stars and Stripes, and they said it was 'Live at Fat Tuesday's.' I never played at Fat Tuesday's [in New York City], and at that point I knew I was compelled to do this trio record, and I'm glad I did it."

== Track listing ==
No.	Title	Writer(s)	Length
1.	"Axpax"		12:05
2.	"Blues on the Corner"	McCoy Tyner	10:27
3.	"Largo" (from the New World Symphony)	Antonín Dvořák	13:29
4.	"Slop"		11:40
5.	"Mack the Knife"	Kurt Weill; Bertolt Brecht	8:58
6.	"Bone Bop"		14:45
Total length:			71:24

== Personnel ==
- Kenny Garrett – alto saxophone
- Charnett Moffett – double bass
- Brian Blade – drums
