= Happy People (Kenny Garrett album) =

Studio album by Kenny Garrett
- Released: March 12, 2002
- Recorded: September 2001
- Studio: Oceanway Studios, Los Angeles; Hannibal Studios, Santa Monica; Sterling Sound, NYC (mastering)
- Genre: Jazz; post-bop
- Length: 61:29
- Label: Warner Bros. WB 9 47754-2
- Producer: Kenny Garrett; Marcus Miller

Kenny Garrett chronology
Simply Said (1999)	Happy People (2002)	Standard of Language (2003)

Happy People is the tenth studio album by saxophonist Kenny Garrett, released by Warner Bros. Records on March 12, 2002.

Recording for the album was scheduled to begin on September 11, 2001, in Los Angeles, and while the tragic events of that day deeply affected all of the musicians, they decided to continue the session. Garrett subsequently dedicated it to those who lost their lives that day.

== Reception ==
Professional ratings
Review scores
Source	Rating
AllMusic	3/5 stars

William Ruhlmann of AllMusic stated, "What kept Happy People from being a compromised effort was Garrett's always-impressive playing, but it was certainly a record that carefully touched a lot of bases." All About Jazz's C. Andrew Hovan wrote critically of the album: "too much of what constitutes this mixed bag is simply unbecoming to an artist of Garrett's stature. [...] Only when Bobby Hutcherson is present and on the cathartic 'Brother B. Harper' do we really get a sense of Garrett's great talent, a talent that seems to have been sublimated for the most part since 1996's Pursuance." In a BBC review by John Eyles, he noted, "Garrett effectively becomes a bit-part player on his own album, mainly reduced to playing themes and riffs. The music here is not unpleasant, rather it is far too 'pleasant'; all too easily it assumes the status of light... background music, however hard one tries to focus on it." Finally, Lucy Tauss of JazzTimes described Happy People as "an eclectic, multilayered offering from Garrett".

== Track listing ==
All tracks are written by Kenny Garrett except where noted.

No.	Title	Writer(s)	Length
1.	"Song for DiFang"		5:26
2.	"Happy People"		5:12
3.	"Tango in 6"		5:52
4.	"Ain't Nothing but the Blues"		5:11
5.	"Song #8"		3:42
6.	"Halima's Story"		5:32
7.	"Monk-ing Around"		4:43
8.	"A Hole in One"		5:59
9.	"Thessalonika"		4:50
10.	"Asian Medley: Akatonbo / Arirang / Tsubasawo Kudasai"	"Akatonbo": Kōsaku Yamada, Rofū Miki "Arirang": traditional Korean folk song "Tsubasawo Kudasai": Kunihiko Murai, Michio Yamagami	7:03
11.	"Brother B. Harper"		7:59
Total length:			61:29

== Personnel ==
Musicians

- Kenny Garrett – alto and soprano saxophones
- Vernell Brown Jr. – piano
- Charnett Moffett – double bass
- Chris Dave – drums
- Jean Norris – vocals (2, 5)
- Michael "Patches" Stewart – trumpet and flugelhorn (1–2)
- Bobby Hutcherson – vibraphone (3, 6–7, 9)
- Marcus Miller – bass guitar (1)
- Randy Razz – guitar (4)
- Marcus Baylor – drums (5)

Technical

- Marcus Miller – producer
- Dana Watson – project coordinator
- Bill Schnee – recording engineer, mixing
- Taka Honda – recording engineer (additional)
- Tom Sweeney – assistant engineer
- Greg Calbi – mastering
- The Management Ark – management
- Stephen Walker – art direction
- Kwaku Alston – photography
