= Triology =

Studio album by Kenny Garrett
- Released: 1995
- Recorded: 1994
- Studio: Power Station, New York City; The Hit Factory, New York City (mixing)
- Genre: Jazz; post-bop
- Length: 57:05
- Label: Warner Bros. WB 9 45731-2
- Producer: Kenny Garrett; Matt Pierson; Donald Brown

Kenny Garrett chronology
Black Hope (1992)	Triology (1995)	Pursuance: The Music of John Coltrane (1996)

Triology is the sixth studio album by American jazz saxophonist Kenny Garrett, released by Warner Bros. Records in 1995. It features a trio setting with Garrett on alto saxophone, either Charnett Moffett or Kiyoshi Kitagawa on bass, and Brian Blade on drums.

The album was made in dedication to saxophonists Sonny Rollins and Joe Henderson.

== Reception ==
Professional ratings
Review scores
Source	Rating
AllMusic	4.5/5 stars
Jazz Music Archives	5/5 stars

The AllMusic review stated, "The trio format forces the enterprising saxophonist to create all the harmonic and melodic tension by himself. And with his tart throaty tone, cutting attack, bluesy contours and harmonic fluidity, Garrett is more than able to sustain interest." Steve Wyzard of Jazz Music Archives was positive of the album: "Triology does without the melodic 'oomph' of keyboards, guitar, or another horn. ... There are no weak links and no showing off, nor is there any hint of 'hushed reverence'. Triology is the work of a true virtuoso who knows who he is, and where he wants to go."

== Track listing ==
All tracks are written by Kenny Garrett except where noted.

No.	Title	Writer(s)	Length
1.	"Delfeayo's Dilemma"	Wynton Marsalis	5:40
2.	"Night and Day"	Cole Porter	6:53
3.	"Giant Steps"	John Coltrane	4:50
4.	"A Time for Love"	Johnny Mandel; Paul Francis Webster	6:31
5.	"Wayne's Thang"		6:48
6.	"Pressing the Issue"	Mulgrew Miller	6:19
7.	"Koranne Said"		4:31
8.	"Oriental Towaway Zone"		6:09
9.	"In Your Own Sweet Way"	Dave Brubeck	5:47
10.	"What Is This Thing Called Love?"	Porter	3:37
Total length:			57:05

== Personnel ==
Musicians

- Kenny Garrett – alto saxophone
- Charnett Moffett (2, 4, 7), Kiyoshi Kitagawa (1, 3, 5, 6, 8–10) – double bass
- Brian Blade – drums

Technical

- Matt Pierson – executive producer
- Donald Brown – producer
- Bibi Green – production coordinator
- Robin Burgess – management
- Eric Calvi – recording engineer
- Dan Wojanar – assistant recording engineer
- James Farber – mixing
- Robin Lynch – art direction
- Lisa Peardon – photography
- Emilio Lyons – saxophone technician
