= Pushing the World Away =

Studio album by Kenny Garrett
- Released: September 17, 2013
- Genre: Jazz
- Length: 72:06
- Label: Mack Avenue; MAC 1078
- Producer: Kenny Garrett; Donald Brown

Kenny Garrett chronology
Seeds from the Underground (2012)	Pushing the World Away (2013)	Do Your Dance! (2016)

Pushing the World Away is the Grammy-nominated, critically acclaimed fourteenth studio album by Kenny Garrett, released on September 17, 2013, on Mack Avenue Records. The album peaked at number 6 on the Billboard Traditional Jazz Albums chart. Featured musicians include keyboardists Vernell Brown and Benito Gonzalez, percussionist Rudy Bird, bassist Corcoran Holt and drummers Marcus Baylor, McClenty Hunter, and Mark Whitfield Jr.

== Reception ==
Professional ratings
Review scores
Source	Rating
AllMusic	4/5 stars
DownBeat	4/5 stars
Financial Times	4/5 stars
Jazzwise	4/5 stars
PopMatters	7/10
The New York Times	(favorable)
WBGO	(favorable)

Thom Jurek of AllMusic wrote, "Pushing the World Away is a wildly diverse offering for Garrett. What it doesn't reveal in swing it does in intricacies, shadows, impressive arrangements, and striking musicianship."

== Track listing ==
All tracks are written by Kenny Garrett except where noted.

No.	Title	Writer(s)	Length
1.	"A Side Order of Hijiki"		3:44
2.	"Hey, Chick"		6:05
3.	"Chucho's Mambo"		7:45
4.	"Lincoln Center"		6:26
5.	"J'ouvert (Homage to Sonny Rollins)"		4:54
6.	"That's It"		4:59
7.	"I Say a Little Prayer"	Burt Bacharach; Hal David	4:29
8.	"Pushing the World Away"		9:12
9.	"Homma San"		4:38
10.	"Brother Brown"		5:47
11.	"Alpha Man"		8:42
12.	"Rotation"		5:25

== Personnel ==
Musicians

- Kenny Garrett – alto saxophone (tracks 1–7, 9, 11, 12), soprano saxophone (track 8), chant (track 8), piano (track 10), arranger
- Donald Brown – arranger (track 9)
- Benito Gonzalez – piano (tracks 1–3, 5–7, 9, 12)
- Corcoran Holt – bass
- Marcus Baylor – drums (tracks 1–3, 5, 6, 9, 12)
- Rudy Bird – percussion (tracks 3, 5–7, 9), cymbals and gong (track 8)
- Ravi Best – trumpet (track 3)
- Vernell Brown – piano (tracks 4, 8, 11, 12), chant (track 8)
- McClenty Hunter – drums (tracks 4, 7, 10, 12), vocals (track 6)
- Mark Whitfield Jr. – drums (tracks 8, 11, 12)
- Jean Baylor – vocals (track 9)
- Carolin Pook – violin (track 10)
- Brian Sanders – cello (track 10)
- Jen Herman – viola (track 10)
- Misha Tarasov – string arrangement (track 10)

Technical

- Kenny Garrett, Donald Brown – producer
- Gretchen C. Valade – executive producer
- Al Pryor – Executive VP of A&R
- Joe Ferla – recording, mixing engineer
- Bob Mallory, Fred Sladkey – assistant engineer
- Greg Calbi – mastering engineer
- Will Wakefield – production manager
- Randall Kennedy – creative director
- Maria Ehrenreich – creative services, production
- Michael Snyder – art direction, design
- Keith Major – photography

== Awards and nominations ==
Year	Result	Award	Category	Work
2014	Nominated	Grammy Award	Best Jazz Instrumental Album	Pushing the World Away
2014	Nominated	Soul Train Awards	Best Traditional Jazz Performance	Pushing the World Away

== Charts ==
Chart (2013)	Peak position
US Billboard Traditional Jazz Albums	6
