= Jazz Door =

German bootleg record label

Jazz Door was a record label of ITM Media that released live and studio recordings from prominent names in jazz, including Miles Davis and Joe Henderson. Many releases were not authorized by the artists or their record companies.

No.	Artists	Albums	Recorded
1201	Miles Davis	Live in Paris	10/27/1969
1203	Albert Ayler	In Memory of Albert Ayler	5/1/1966
1204	Bud Powell	The Legacy	3/1953-1964
1206	Benny Carter and His Orchestra		1946
1207	Dizzy Gillespie & The Mitchell-Ruff Duo	Blues People	
1208	Bill Evans-Stan Getz Quartet	But Beautiful	8/1974
1209	Charlie Parker	Inglewood Jam, Live at Tradewinds 1952 w/Chet Baker, S. Criss, Al Haig, H. Babasin, L. Marable	1952
1210/11	John Coltrane	Visit to Scandinavia w/Mccoy Tyner, Jimmy Garrison, Elvin Jones	11/1962
1213	Charles Mingus	Charles Mingus Trios w/Hampton Hawes, Dannie Richmond, Bud Powell, Roy Haynes	1957, 1953
1214	Nina Simone	Moon of Alabama	11/17/1984
1215	Billie Holiday	Lady Day - The Storyville Concerts	
1216	Miles Davis	Live at the Hi-Hat w/J. Migliori	
1217	Juanita Hall	Sings the Blues	
1218	Various artists	The Bop Rebells [sic] w/Sonny Stitt Quartet (NYC, 1957), Sonny Rollins Quartet (NYC, 11/4/1957), Thad Jones Quintet (NYC, 12/24/1956), Thad Jones Sextet (NYC, 1/6/1957)	
1219	Charles Mingus	Keystone Korner w/Jack Walrath, George Adams, Dannie Mixon, Dannie Richmond	1976
1223	Pat Metheny Group	Blue Asphalt w/Lyle Mays, Mark Egan, Dan Gottlieb	1977
1224	Miles Davis	No More Blues w/George Coleman, Herbie Hancock, Ron Carter, Tony Williams, Wayne Shorter, Richard Davis	6/?/1963, 5/21/1966
1225	Miles Davis	Seven Steps to Heaven	
1226	Miles Davis	On Green Dolphin Street	1960
1228	Sting & Gil Evans	Last Session w/John Surman	11/7/1987
1230	The Michael Brecker Band	Live	1989
1231	Pat Metheny Group	In Concert w/Lyle Mays, Steve Rodby, Paul Wertico, Armando Marçal, Pedro Aznar	1992
1232/33	Jaco Pastorius	In NY Live w/Hiram Bullock, Kenwood Dennard, Delmar Brown	
1234	Stanley Clarke w/ George Duke	Live in Montreaux	1988
1235	Miles Davis	Miles in Montreux w/Rick Margitza, Kei Akagi, Adam Holzman, Joe Foley McCreary, Benny Rietveld, Ricky Wellman, Monyungo Jackson, Chaka Khan	7/21/1989
1236/37	Tony Scott & Bill Evans	A Day in New York	11/1957
1239	Judy Garland	The Ladies of the 20th Century	
1240	Marlene Dietrich	The Ladies of the 20th Century: Marlene Dietrich in Concert	1240
1242	Miles Davis and John Coltrane	in New York w/Red Garland, Paul Chambers, Arthur Taylor, John Coltrane, Bill Evans, Philly Joe Jones, Wynton Kelly, Jimmy Cobb, George Coleman, Herbie Hancock, Ron Carter, Tony Williams	1957,58,59,63
1243	Phillip Wilson	The Phillip Wilson Project	
1244	Modern Jazz Quartet	A Night at the Opera Live, Opera of Philadelphia	1992
1245	Gil Evans & Sting	Open the Jazz Door w/George Lewis	1993
1246	Pat Metheny Group	Unity Village w/Lyle Mays, Mark Egan, Danny Gottlieb	1979
1247	Lambert, Hendricks, and Ross	Watermelon Man	
1248	The Brecker Brothers	Live at NYC 9/92 w/Michael Brecker, Randy Brecker, Mike Stern, George Whitty, James Genus, Dennis Chambers	1992
1249	The John Scofield Quartet	Plays Live w/John Scofield, Joe Lovano, Marc Johnson, Bill Stewart	1991
1250	John McLaughlin/Carlos Santana Band	Live in Chicago w/Larry Young, Carlos Santana, John McLaughlin, Doug Rauch, Billy Cobham, Armando Peraza	1973
1251/52	Jack DeJohnette/Pat Metheny/Herbie Hancock/Dave Holland	Parallel Realities Live (Philadelphia)	1990
1253/54	Eric Dolphy	The Complete Uppsala Concert w/E. Dolphy, R. Johansson, K. Lindgren, R. Carlsson	9/4/1961
1255	Elvin Jones	Trane Member Concert w/Frank Foster, Farrell, Chick Corea	12/1971
1256/57	Miles Davis	Time After Time w/Kenny Garrett, Kei Akagi, John Beasly, Joe Foley McCreary, Benny Rietveld, Ricky Wellman, Monyungo Jackson	4/11/1989
1258	Natalie Cole	I've Got Love On My Mind	1993
1259	Kenny Garrett	Stars & Stripes, with Charnett Moffett and Brian Blade	1993
1260	Michael Brecker	The Cost of Living w/Joey Calderazzo, Jay Anderson, Adam Nussbaum	11/1989
1261	Betty Carter	I Didn't Know What Time It Was	
1262	Chet Baker	Chet Plays & Sings the Great Ballads	1966
1264	Nancy Wilson & her Trio	Live in Europe	1978
1265	Chick Corea	Summer Night Live '87 w/Acoustic Band, J. Patitucci, D. Weckl	1987
1267	Joe Henderson	6tet/4tet w/K. Barron, C. Walton	1967, 11/6/73
1269	Dizzy Gillespie United Nations Orchestra	Strangers in Paradise w/Dizzy Gillespie, Arturo Sandoval, Claudio Roditi, Papo Vazquez, James Moody, Paquito d'Rivera, Danilo Perez, Ed Cherry, Ignacio Berroa, Airto Moreira, Giovanni Hidalgo, Flora Purim, John Lee	10/1990
1270	Herbie Hancock	Quartet Live w/Mcferrin, Brecker, Osby, Foster, Williams,	1988, 1992
1271	Sonny Rollins	First Moves w/Quintet Live 11/74 With Rufus Harley	11/1974
1273	Bob Mintzer Big Band	Techno Pop w/Bob Mintzer, Lawrence Feldman, Bob Malach, Roger Rosenberg, Pete Yellin, Marvin Stamm, Laurie Frink, Tim Hagens, Bob Millikan, Michael Phillip Mossmann, Dave Bargeron, Mike Davies, Keith O'Quinn, Dave Taylor, Phil Markowitz, Jim McNeely, Mich	
1274	Herbie Hancock	Live in NY '93 w/Trio, Jeff Littleton, Gene Jackson	1993
1275	Bob Berg & Mike Stern	Games	1990
1276	Oscar Peterson	Fall'in in Love With Oscar	
1277	Dizzy-Monk	Dizzy 5tet With Stitt w/Thelonious Monk, Al Mckibbon, Kai Winding, Art Blakey	1971, 1974
1278	Joe Henderson	Live w/Bheki Mseleku, George Mraz, Al Foster	1994
1279	Joshua Redman	Captured Live	1994
1280	Carmen McRae & her Trio	Live	1975
1282	Joshua Redman Quintet	Live in San Francisco - Blues for Pat w/Pat Metheny, Christian McBride, Billy Higgins	
1283	Robben Ford and The Blue Line	In San Francisco w/Roscoe Beck, Tom Brechtlein	1993
1284/85	Miles Davis	Another Bitches Brew w/Keith Jarrett, Gary Bartz, Michael Henderson, Don Alias....	11/3/1971, 11/7/1973
1286	Jaco Pastorius-Pat Metheny-Paul Bley-Bruce Ditmas	Jaco	1974
1287/88	Miles Davis	In Montreux w/Rick Margitka, Kei Akagi, Adam Holzman, Chaka Khan, Others	7/21/1989
1290	Wynton Marsalis	Live in Swing Town w/Wes Anderson, Walter Blanding, Wycliffe Gordon...	1994
1293	John Zorn	Masada Live w/Dave Douglas, Greg Cohen, Kenny Wollesen	11/12/1994
1294	Miles Davis	It's About That Time Montreux 1969 w/Quintet With Wayne Shorter	7/25/1969
1296	Jaco Pastorius	The Word of Mouth Big Band '82	1982
1297	Tuck & Patti	Everything Is Gonna Be Alright Live '88	1988
1299	Herbie Hancock	Duets Live w/Chick Corea	1978
12101	Miles Davis	Fat Time w/Mike Stern, Bill Evans, Al Foster, Mino Cinelu, Marcus Miller	10/4/1981
12102	Ernestine Anderson	Ernestine Anderson Live in NY w/Diane Reeves, Diane Schurr	
12103	Mel Tormé	Mel Tormé Live in NY	
12107/8	Miles Davis	Carnegie Hall w/Gil Evans Orch, Hank Mobley	
12110	Miles Davis	All the Things Live '49 w/Tadd Dameron 5Tet, James Moody	1949
12112	Ornette Coleman	The Belgrade Concert w/Ornette Coleman 4Tet, Charlie Haden	
12118	Chet Baker	Love for Sale: Live at Ronnie Scott's With Michel Grailler and Ricardo Del Fra, featuring Van Morrison	June 6, 1986
12119	Lou Rawls	At the Century Plaza	
12120	Joe Henderson	Sunrise in Tokyo w/Terumasa Hino	
12121	Sonny Rollins	Just Once w/Clifton Anderson, Mark Soskin, Jerome Harris, Tommy Campbell	1993
12142	Paco de Lucia	Alcazar de Sevilla	1991
