= Sketches of MD: Live at the Iridium =

Live album by Kenny Garrett featuring Pharoah Sanders
- Released: September 22, 2008
- Venue: Iridium Jazz Club, New York City
- Genre: Jazz
- Length: 56:39
- Label: Mack Avenue; MAC 1042
- Producer: Kenny Garrett

Kenny Garrett chronology
Beyond the Wall (2006)	Sketches of MD: Live at the Iridium (2008)	Seeds from the Underground (2012)

Sketches of MD: Live at the Iridium is one of the few live albums by Kenny Garrett, his first for Mack Avenue Records—based out of Garrett's hometown of Detroit—released in 2008. Garrett is featured in a quintet with tenor saxophonist Pharoah Sanders, keyboardist Benito Gonzalez, bassist Nat Reeves and drummer Jamire Williams.

The "MD" of the title track refers to Garrett's old bandleader Miles Davis.

== Reception ==
Professional ratings
Review scores
Source	Rating
All About Jazz	3.5/5 stars
AllMusic	3.5/5 stars
DownBeat	2/5 stars
The Guardian	3/5 stars
PopMatters	8/10

In a review for AllMusic, Thom Jurek wrote: "What is most pleasing about Sketches of MD is that Garrett is as concerned with offering his audience a solid and utterly engaging show as he is with having himself thought of as a banner-carrying sophisticated jazzman."

DownBeat's Jim Macnie called the album "frustratingly static", and commented: "Garrett may be a fire-starter, but his party records need a bit more design."

John Kelman of All About Jazz described the recording as "an album of unabashed blowing and multiplicity of stylistic references", but noted that the rendition of "Happy People" "turns tedious".

Writing for The Guardian, John Fordham stated that the album "catches the incandescent quality of a typical Garrett gig", and remarked: "It's good party music, but the kind of spontaneous turns that make you jump are rare."

In an article for JazzTimes, Steve Greenlee suggested that Garrett's association with Pharoah Sanders "is pushing Garrett to new heights", and noted the influence of "John Coltrane, Wayne Shorter, Cannonball Adderley and others".

Claudrena N. Harold of PopMatters commented: "If you've had the fortune of seeing Garrett live, the magic he captures on this disc... should come as no surprise." She called the opening track "a perfect showcase of the intellectual curiosity and spiritual probing that makes Garrett's music so captivating", and wrote: "Shrieks and honks by Garrett and Pharaoh Sanders not only conjure up spirits from jazz's illustrious past, but summon us to participate in their spiritual communion."

== Track listing ==
All tracks are written by Kenny Garrett.

No.	Title	Length
1.	"The Ring"	14:35
2.	"Intro to Africa"	9:21
3.	"Sketches of MD"	10:02
4.	"Wayne's Thang"	10:57
5.	"Happy People"	11:44
Total length:		56:39

== Personnel ==
Musicians

- Kenny Garrett – alto saxophone, bass clarinet, organ, synthesizer
- Pharoah Sanders – tenor saxophone, vocals
- Nat Reeves – bass
- Benito Gonzalez – piano, electric Rhodes piano, synthesizer
- Jamire Williams – drums

Technical

- Kenny Garrett – producer
- Gretchen Valade – executive producer, liner notes
- Al Pryor – executive VP of A&R
- Jonathan Duckett – engineer (recording)
- Greg Calbi – engineer (mastering)
- Raj Naik – art direction, design
- Casey Conroy – creative direction
- Maria Enrenreich – director of creative service
- Jimmy & Dena Katz – photography

== Chart positions ==
Chart (2008)	Peak position
US Billboard Top Jazz Albums	11
