= Seeds from the Underground =

Seeds From The Underground

Studio album by Kenny Garrett
- Released: April 10, 2012
- Genre: Jazz
- Length: 70:01
- Label: Mack Avenue; MAC 1063
- Producer: Kenny Garrett; Donald Brown; Maria Ehrenreich

Kenny Garrett chronology
Sketches of MD: Live at the Iridium (2008)	Seeds From The Underground (2012)	Pushing the World Away (2013)

Seeds from the Underground is the thirteenth studio album by saxophonist Kenny Garrett. It was released on April 10, 2012, on Mack Avenue Records and received two Grammy Award nominations in Best Jazz Instrumental Album and Best Improvised Jazz Solo categories, as well as an NAACP Image Award nomination in the Outstanding Jazz Album category, a Soul Train Award nomination in the Best Traditional Jazz Artist/Group category, a Jazz Awards nomination for Alto Saxophonist of the Year and an Echo Award win in the Saxophonist of the Year category. It features Garrett in a quintet with pianist Benito Gonzalez, bassist Nat Reeves, percussionist Rudy Bird, and drummer Ronald Bruner, along with a small choir.

== Critical reception ==
Professional ratings
Review scores
Source	Rating
AllMusic	4/5 stars
The New York Times	(favorable)
The Guardian	3/5 stars
PopMatters	8/10

The album received a 77/100 score on Metacritic, based on four reviews from mainstream media.

== Track listing ==
All tracks are written by Kenny Garrett.

No.	Title	Length
1.	"Boogety Boogety"	9:03
2.	"J. Mac"	6:26
3.	"Wiggins"	7:37
4.	"Haynes Here"	7:27
5.	"Detroit"	4:21
6.	"Seeds from the Underground"	8:08
7.	"Du-Wo-Mo"	8:16
8.	"Welcome Earth Song"	8:43
9.	"Ballad Jarrett"	6:22
10.	"Laviso, I Bon?"	3:38
Total length:		70:01

== Personnel ==
Musicians

- Kenny Garrett – alto saxophone, soprano saxophone, piano
- Benito Gonzalez – piano
- Nat Reeves – bass
- Ronald Bruner – drums
- Rudy Bird – batá, percussion, vocals
- Donald Brown – vocals
- Rusty Chops – vocals
- Sengbe Kona Khasu – vocals
- Nedelka Prescod – vocals
- Misha Tarasov – vocals

Technical

- Kenny Garrett, Donald Brown, Maria Ehrenreich – producer
- Gretchen Valade – executive producer, liner notes
- Greg Calbi – engineer (mastering)
- Todd Whitelock – engineer (mixing)
- Fernando Lodeiro, Tim Marchiafava, Damon Whittemore – assistant engineer
- Will Wakefield – production manager
- Tino Passante – studio manager
- Randall Kennedy – creative director
- Timothy Zach – art direction, design
- Keith Major – photography

== Awards and nominations ==
Year	Result	Award	Category	Work
2012	Nominated	NAACP Image Award	Outstanding Jazz Album	Seeds from the Underground
2012	Nominated	Soul Train Awards	Best Traditional Jazz Artist/Group	Seeds from the Underground
2013	Nominated	Grammy Award	Best Jazz Instrumental Album	Seeds from the Underground
2013	Nominated	Grammy Award	Best Improvised Jazz Solo	"J. Mac" on Seeds from the Underground
2013	Won	Echo Award	Best International Jazz Saxophone Performance	Seeds from the Underground

== Chart positions ==
Chart (2012)	Peak position
US Billboard Top Jazz Albums	10
