= Standard of Language =

Studio album by Kenny Garrett
- Released: March 11, 2003
- Studios: Avatar Studios, New York City; Oceanway Studio, Los Angeles
- Genres: Jazz; post-bop
- Length: 58:02
- Labels: Warner Bros. WB 9 48404-2
- Producers: Kenny Garrett; Marcus Miller

Kenny Garrett chronology
Happy People (2002)	Standard of Language (2003)	Beyond the Wall (2006)

Standard of Language is a studio album by saxophonist Kenny Garrett, released on March 11, 2003, his eighth for Warner Bros. Records.

== Reception ==
Professional ratings
Review scores
Source	Rating
AllMusic	4.5/5 stars
The Guardian	4/5 stars
The Penguin Guide to Jazz	4/4 stars

John Fordham of The Guardian stated: "though much of the music is urgent and intense, Garrett's melodic gifts do not desert him in the composing, and at least two-thirds of the album features typically compelling themes." The AllMusic review by Paula Edelstein noted that Garrett "brings a muscular yet lyrical eloquence to nine songs". David Franklin, writing for JazzTimes, remarked, "his quartet brilliantly execute a program of freshly original Garrett compositions. [...] Throughout, Garrett dances, cries, screeches and/or squawks in an extraordinary example of his personal amalgamation of bop and free-jazz elements." All About Jazz's Riel Lazarus stated: "Garrett and company manage to straddle all three dimensions of human life: past, present and future. While the language spoken is that of traditional modern jazz, the dialect is undeniably current, and at times hints at things to come." The Penguin Guide to Jazz gave it four stars, calling it "unmissable" and saying "The band perform magnificently throughout and the trimmed-down personnel allows Garrett's luminous alto to shine through."

== Track listing ==
All tracks are written by Kenny Garrett except where noted.

No.	Title	Writer(s)	Length
1.	"What Is This Thing Called Love?"	Cole Porter	7:44
2.	"Kurita Sensei"		4:21
3.	"Xyz"		6:16
4.	"Native Tongue"		5:11
5.	"Chief Blackwater"		4:52
6.	"Doc Tone's Short Speech"		5:48
7.	"Just a Second to Catch My Breath"		4:44
8.	"Gendai"		7:55
9.	"Standard of Language I II III"		11:11
Total length:			58:02

== Personnel ==
Musicians

- Kenny Garrett – alto saxophone, soprano saxophone
- Vernell Brown Jr. – piano
- Charnett Moffett – bass
- Chris Dave, Eric Harland (9) – drums

Technical

- Marcus Miller – producer
- Bill Schnee – engineer
- Joe Ferla – engineer, mixing
- Aya Takemura, Ross Petersen, Tom Sweeney – assistant engineer
- Greg Calbi (Sterling Sound Studio, New York City) – mastering
- Stephen Walker – art direction
- David Grey – graphic design
- Keith Major – photography
