= Beyond the Wall (album) =

Studio album by Kenny Garrett
- Released: August 29, 2006
- Recorded: February 19–21, 2006
- Studios: Right Track Recording, NYC
- Genre: Jazz
- Length: 76:50
- Labels: Nonesuch, 7559-79933-2
- Producers: Kenny Garrett; Steven Epstein

Kenny Garrett chronology
| Standard of Language (2003) | Beyond the Wall (2006) | Sketches of MD: Live at the Iridium (2008) |

Beyond the Wall is the twelfth studio album by Kenny Garrett released on August 29, 2006, by Nonesuch Records. Among the musicians on the album are tenor saxophonist Pharoah Sanders, vibraphonist Bobby Hutcherson, pianist Mulgrew Miller, and drummer Brian Blade.

For Garrett, Beyond the Wall is a continuation of his fascination with and study of Asian cultures and philosophies. On Beyond the Wall, Garrett mixed Chinese instrumentation with Western strings, creating an amalgam of musical styles, which hang together effortlessly. Some of the tracks on Beyond the Wall relate specifically to his travels.

== Reception ==
Professional ratings
Review scores
| Source | Rating |
|---|---|
| All About Jazz | 3.5/5 stars |
| AllMusic | 4.5/5 stars |
| Audiophile Audition | 5/5 stars |
| The Guardian | 3/5 stars |
| The Penguin Guide to Jazz Recordings | 4/4 stars |

The album received a Grammy Award nomination for Best Jazz Instrumental Album.

In a review for AllMusic, Thom Jurek wrote: "This is Garrett's strongest moment in an already enduring career; it's fully realized compositionally, and in terms of its arrangements and its playing, it's virtually flawless without sacrificing emotion or creative intent or aesthetic vision. Simply put, it's his masterpiece."

The Washington Post's Geoffrey Himes called the recording "one of the year's best albums", and stated: "Garrett holds his own in... heady company, warbling his alto sax like an Islamic prayer horn one moment and shouting through it like an Alabama church choir the next."

John Kelman of All About Jazz commented: "It's hard to find fault with the deeply emotional ride of Beyond the Wall except, perhaps, in its unrelenting seriousness. Still, with a cast of players this strong, one can forgive its earnestness and revel in performances that bring Tyner's and Coltrane's innovations into the 21st Century."

Writing for The Guardian, John L. Walters remarked: "The great wall of China cover might imply world/jazz fusion, but Beyond the Wall is very much a jazz suite... the project's core is pure, deep-rooted improvisation, with plenty of forthright tenor and alto from Garrett, plus A-list sidemen."

Steve Greenlee of JazzTimes stated that the album "is no gimmick, and its pancontinental jazz never feels contrived", and noted that Garrett's experience climbing the Great Wall "unleashed a new source of creativity in him."

The BBC's Lara Bellini commented: "Beyond The Wall embraces jazz in its original connotation, as a form so flexible and unrestricted that is both able to embrace the world and not be afraid to question its own foundations in the process."

A reviewer for Audiophile Audition called the album "a dazzingly foray into the music, culture, and instruments of the Far East, reflected through the progressive jazz forms Garrett is famous for", and "a beautiful album, rich in melody, groove, and progressive notions of what jazz can be".

== Track listing ==
All tracks are written by Kenny Garrett. Track 3 contains a sample from "Ngontog Gyan (Ornament for Clear Realization)" from the album Tibet: The Heart of Dharma (Ellipsis Arts).

| No. | Title | Length |
|---|---|---|
| 1. | "Calling" | 9:37 |
| 2. | "Beyond The Wall" | 7:33 |
| 3. | "Qing Wen" | 9:46 |
| 4. | "Realization (Marching Towards The Light)" | 6:10 |
| 5. | "Tsunami Song" | 4:47 |
| 6. | "Kiss To The Skies" | 9:40 |
| 7. | "Now" | 11:48 |
| 8. | "Gwoka" | 9:14 |
| 9. | "May Peace Be Upon Them" | 8:15 |
| Total length: | | 76:50 |

== Personnel ==
Musicians

- Kenny Garrett – alto saxophone (1–4, 6–9), piano (5)
- Robert Hurst – bass
- Brian Blade – drums
- Mulgrew Miller – piano (1–4, 6–9)
- Pharoah Sanders – tenor saxophone (1–4, 6–8)
- Bobby Hutcherson – vibraphone (3–4, 6–8)
- Rogerio Boccato – percussion (1, 3–8)
- Nedelka Echols – vocals (3–4, 6, 8)
- Arlene Lewis, Dawn Caveness, Genea Martin, Geovanti Steward, Kevin Wheatley – vocals (6, 8)
- Jonathan Gandelsman – violin (5)
- Neal Humphreys – cello (5)
- Guowei Wang – erhu (5)
- Susan Jolles – harp (5)

Technical

- Kenny Garrett – producer
- Steven Epstein – producer, engineer (mastering)
- Todd Whitelock – recording engineer (mastering, mixing)
- David Stoller, Jason Stasium, Timmy Olmstead – assistant recording engineer
- Doyle Partners – design
- Mark Anderson – photography
- Barron Claiborne – photography (of Garrett)

== Awards and nominations ==
| Year | Result | Award | Category | Work |
|---|---|---|---|---|
| 2007 | Nominated | Grammy Award | Best Jazz Instrumental Album | Beyond the Wall |

== Charts ==
| Chart (2006) | Peak position |
|---|---|
| US Billboard Top Jazz Albums | 13 |
