= Vernell Brown =

Vernell Brown may refer to:

- Vernell Brown Jr. (1971–2022), American jazz and rhythm and blues pianist, composer, arranger
- Vernell Brown III (born 2006), American football wide receiver
