= With All My Heart (Harvey Mason album) =

Studio album by Harvey Mason
- Released: November 2003 (JP); 2004 (US)
- Studio: Sear Sound Recording Studios, NYC; Firehouse Recording Studios, CA
- Genre: Jazz
- Label: Videoarts Music; Bluebird Records
- Producer: Harvey Mason

With All My Heart is an album by jazz drummer Harvey Mason. It was released by Videoarts Music .

== Music and recording ==
Mason plays on each of the album's 11 tracks with a different combination of pianist and bassist.

== Reception ==
Professional ratings
Review scores
Source	Rating
AllMusic	4/5 stars

The AllAboutJazz reviewer commented on the inevitable lack of tightness in some of the band performances, given a likely lack of rehearsal time, but summarized that "this is a very solid, solid outing". Herbie Hancock won the Best Jazz Instrumental Solo Grammy for "Speak Like a Child".

== Track listing and personnel ==
Harvey Mason (drums) plays on every track.

Track	Title	Personnel	Length
1	"Bernie's Tune"	Kenny Barron (piano), Ron Carter (bass)	3:41
2	"If I Should Lose You"	Chick Corea (piano), Dave Carpenter (bass)	7:26
3	"So Near, So Far"	Fred Hersch (piano), Eddie Gomez (bass)	4:41
4	"Swamp Fire"	Monty Alexander (piano), Charnett Moffett (bass)	4:18
5	"Smoke Gets in Your Eyes"	Bob James (piano), Charlie Haden (bass)	6:13
6	"Hindsight"	Cedar Walton (piano), Ron Carter (bass)	5:26
7	"Dindi"	Brad Mehldau (piano), Larry Grenadier (bass)	7:47
8	"Without a Song"	Mulgrew Miller (piano), Ron Carter (bass)	6:40
9	"One Morning in May"	Dave Grusin (piano), Mike Valerio (bass)	4:41
10	"Speak Like a Child"	Herbie Hancock (piano), Dave Carpenter (bass)	5:18
11	"Tess"	Hank Jones (piano), George Mraz (bass)	4:40
