= Songbook (Kenny Garrett album) =

Studio album by Kenny Garrett
- Released: May 1997
- Recorded: January 7–8, 1997
- Studio: Sear Sound, New York City
- Genre: Jazz; post-bop
- Length: 59:35
- Label: Warner Bros. WB 9 46551-2
- Producer: Robin Burgess

Kenny Garrett chronology
Pursuance: The Music of John Coltrane (1996)	Songbook (1997)	Simply Said (1999)

Songbook is the eighth studio album by American jazz saxophonist Kenny Garrett, released in 1997 by Warner Bros. Records. It features Garrett in a quartet consisting of pianist Kenny Kirkland and drummer Jeff "Tain" Watts (both known as part of Branford Marsalis's quartet), and bassist Nat Reeves.

== Reception ==
Professional ratings
Review scores
Source	Rating
AllMusic	4/5 stars
The Penguin Guide to Jazz Recordings	3.5/4 stars

In 1998, the album received a Grammy Award nomination for Best Jazz Instrumental Performance.

In a review for AllMusic, Chris Slawecki wrote, "Always inventive, curious, daring, and exuberant, Garrett's Songbook proves him worthy of the alto legacy that most people ... seem to agree he carries, as he demonstrates what sounds like the uncanny ability to play two-faced—one face looking forward to the freshness of new concepts and creations as yet undiscovered, yet with another face which simultaneously looks back to the fine, fierce alto tradition of Phil Woods and Charlie Parker."

Owen Cordle of JazzTimes noted Garrett's "intense and passionate" sound and called his sidemen "tough players who create a slashing rhythmic drive". He also commented, "there's no doubt about the musical success and capability of these players with any material."

Writing for The Washington Post, Geoffrey Himes stated that, on the album, Garrett "emerges as an imposing composer", and remarked, "The modal improvising, the impressionistic gestures, the willingness to slip in and out of a swinging groove all give the 10 pieces the ability to challenge and surprise."

Billboard's Paul Verna called the album Garrett's "most original and accomplished traditional set to date" and "a muscular, no-filler set", with playing that "ranges from rough, avant-gardish riffery to sweetly keening alto tones".

== Track listing ==
All tracks are written by Kenny Garrett.

No.	Title	Length
1.	"2 Down & 1 Across"	5:16
2.	"November 15"	7:38
3.	"Wooden Steps"	6:07
4.	"Sing a Song of Song"	7:22
5.	"Brother Hubbard"	6:34
6.	"Ms. Baja"	5:54
7.	"The House That Nat Built"	4:25
8.	"She Waits for the New Sun"	6:22
9.	"Before It's Time to Say Goodbye"	5:17
10.	"Sounds of the Flying Pygmies"	4:40
Total length:		59:35

== Personnel ==
Musicians

- Kenny Garrett – alto saxophone
- Kenny Kirkland – piano
- Nat Reeves – double bass
- Jeff "Tain" Watts – drums

Technical

- Robin Burgess – management, co-producer
- Joe Ferla – engineer
- Greg Calbi – engineer (mastering)
- John Reigart – assistant engineer (recording)
- Tom Schick – assistant engineer (recording)
- Ed Raso – assistant engineer (mixing)
- Stephen Walker – art direction
- Lenn Irish – photography
