= Who Killed AI? =

Studio album by Kenny Garrett & Svoy
- Released: April 12, 2024
- Genre: Electronica; jazz
- Length: 35:20
- Label: Mack Avenue; MAC 1210
- Producer: Kenny Garrett; Svoy

Kenny Garrett chronology
Sounds from the Ancestors (2021)	Who Killed AI? (2024)

Who Killed AI? is a studio album by Kenny Garrett and Svoy, released on April 12, 2024, on Mack Avenue Records. The album consists of seven non-stop compositions and was recorded mostly at Garrett's home with pre and post-production stages taking place at Svoy's residence in New Jersey. The album is the first electronic record by Garrett.

== Reception ==
Professional ratings
Review scores
Source	Rating
Paris Move	(Indispensable)
JazzViews.net	(Favorable)
Lira.se	(Favorable)
AllMusic	4/5 stars
Rondo.de	4/4 stars
in-akustik	5/5 stars
UKvibe.org	5/5 stars

Matt Collar of AllMusic wrote, :They craft sonic"lly adventurous tracks that wouldn't sound out of place at a rave, but they also feature plenty of propulsive, harmonically nuanced improvisation. Much of this is due to Garrett's crisp, motivic style and his kinetic lines push nicely off Svoy's textured, groove-based soundscapes."

== Track listing ==
All tracks are written by Kenny Garrett and Svoy, except where noted.

No.	Title	Writer(s)	Length
1.	"Ascendence"		3:53
2.	"Miles Running Down AI"		5:11
3.	"Transcendence"		5:12
4.	"Divergence Tu-Dah"		5:10
5.	"Ladies"		3:06
6.	"My Funny Valentine"	Richard Rodgers; Lorenz Hart	6:16
7.	"Convergence"		6:29
Total length:			35:20

== Personnel ==
Musicians

- Kenny Garrett – alto and soprano saxophones, vocals
- Svoy – programming, vocals, piano, keyboards

Technical

- Kenny Garrett – producer, assistant recording and mixing
- Svoy – producer, recording, mixing, mastering
- Timothy Cobb Passarella – art direction, design
- Romelle Cananizado – additional layout
