= 2012 Soul Train Music Awards =

Music awards ceremony in Las Vegas, US

Soul Train Music Awards
- Date: November 25, 2012
- Location: Planet Hollywood, Las Vegas, Nevada
- Country: United States
- Hosted by: Cedric the Entertainer
- First award: 1987

Highlights
- Most awards: Beyoncé (2)
- Website: soultrain.com

Television/radio coverage
- Network: BET, Centric

The 2012 Soul Train Music Awards were held at Planet Hollywood in Las Vegas, Nevada on November 25, 2012. The show was hosted by actor/comedian Cedric the Entertainer. Performers included New Edition, Miguel, Ne-Yo, Keyshia Cole, Tyrese, Elle Varner, John Legend, 2 Chainz, Stevie Wonder, Eddie Levert, Charlie Wilson, Fantasia, Anthony Hamilton, and Marcus Canty. The ceremony also featured a tribute to Soul Train creator Don Cornelius, who died earlier in the year.

== Special awards ==
=== Lifetime Achievement Award ===
- New Edition

== Winners and nominees ==
Winners are in bold text.

=== Album of the Year ===
- **Frank Ocean – Channel Orange**
  - Eric Benét – The One
  - R. Kelly – Write Me Back
  - Nas – Life is Good
  - Usher – Looking 4 Myself

=== Song of the Year ===
- **Tyrese – "Stay"**
  - Estelle – "Thank You"
  - John Legend (featuring Ludacris) – "Tonight (Best You Ever Had)"
  - Trey Songz – "Heart Attack"
  - Usher – "Climax"
  - Wale (featuring Miguel) – "Lotus Flower Bomb"

=== The Ashford & Simpson Songwriter's Award ===
- **John Legend (featuring Ludacris) – "Tonight (Best You Ever Had)"**
  - **Written by: Allen Arthur, Christopher Bridges, Keith Justice, Miguel Pimentel, Clayton Reilly and John Stephens**
- Estelle – "Thank You"
  - Written by: Arden Altino, Akene Dunkley, Jerry Duplessis, Doug F. Edwards, Thomas D. Richardson and Aliaune Thiam
- R. Kelly – "Share My Love"
  - Written by: Robert Kelly
- Nas – "Daughters"
  - Written by: Nasir Jones, Ernest D. Wilson, Patrick Adams, Gary DeCarlo, Dale Frashuer and Paul Leka
- Usher – "Climax"
  - Written by: Usher Raymond IV, Sean Fenton, Thomas Pentz and Ariel Rechtshaid

=== Best R&B/Soul Male Artist ===
- **Miguel**
  - Trey Songz
  - Robin Thicke
  - Tyrese
  - Usher

=== Best R&B/Soul Female Artist ===
- **Beyoncé**
  - Mary J. Blige
  - Keyshia Cole
  - Estelle
  - Fantasia
  - Rihanna
  - Elle Varner

=== Best New Artist ===
- **Elle Varner**
  - Robert Glasper
  - J. Cole
  - Luke James
  - Emeli Sandé

=== Centric Award ===
- **Leah LaBelle**
  - Gary Clark Jr.
  - Daley
  - Santigold
  - Esperanza Spalding
  - Rihanna

=== Best Hip-Hop Song of the Year ===
- **Kanye West (featuring Big Sean, Pusha T and 2 Chainz) – "Mercy"**
  - 2 Chainz (featuring Drake) – "No Lie"
  - Nas – "Daughters"
  - Wale (featuring Miguel) – "Lotus Flower Bomb"
  - Young Jeezy (featuring Ne-Yo) – "Leave You Alone"

=== Best Dance Performance ===
- **Beyoncé – "Love On Top"**
  - Chris Brown – "Turn Up the Music"
  - Nicki Minaj – "Starships"
  - Rihanna – "Where Have You Been"
  - Usher – "Scream"

=== CENTRICTV.com Awards ===
==== Best Caribbean Performance ====
- **Sean Paul – Tomahawk Technique**
  - Jimmy Cliff – Rebirth
  - Cover Drive – Bajan Style
  - Damian Marley – SuperHeavy
  - Matisyahu – Spark Seeker
  - Rihanna – Where Have You Been

==== Best International Performance ====
- **Estelle – "Thank You"**
  - Daley (featuring Marsha Ambrosius) – "Alone Together"
  - Rebecca Ferguson – "Nothing's Real but Love"
  - Gotye (featuring Kimbra) – "Somebody That I Used to Know"
  - Emeli Sandé – "Next to Me"
  - Amy Winehouse – "Our Day Will Come"
  - Rihanna – Where Have You Been

==== Best Traditional Jazz Artist/Group ====
- **Tony Bennett – Isn't It Romantic? (tie)**
- **Robert Glasper – Black Radio (tie)**
  - Chris Botti – Impressions
  - Melody Gardot – The Absence
  - Kenny Garrett – Seeds from the Underground

==== Best Contemporary Jazz Artist/Group ====
- **Esperanza Spalding – Radio Music Society**
  - Brian Culbertson – Dreams
  - Ben Tankard – Full Tank
  - Peter White – Here We Go
  - Cassandra Wilson – Another Country

== Performers ==
- New Edition
- Miguel
- Keyshia Cole
- John Legend
- Tyrese
- Ne-Yo
- 2 Chainz
- Stevie Wonder
- Elle Varner
- Eddie Levert
- Charlie Wilson
- Fantasia
- Marcus Canty
- Anthony Hamilton

== Telecast ==
The Soul Train Awards were taped on November 8 and aired on BET and Centric on November 25, 2012.
