= Black Hope =

Studio album by Kenny Garrett
- Released: September 8, 1992
- Studio: Power Station & Eastside Sound, New York City
- Genre: Jazz; post-bop
- Length: 65:40
- Label: Warner Bros. WB 9 45017-2
- Producer: Donald Brown

Kenny Garrett chronology
| African Exchange Student (1990) | Black Hope (1992) | Triology (1995) |

Black Hope is the fifth studio album by American jazz saxophonist Kenny Garrett, the first that he recorded for Warner Bros. Records, released on September 8, 1992. It features Garrett in a quartet with pianist Kenny Kirkland, bassist Charnett Moffett, and drummer Brian Blade. Additional musicians include veteran tenor saxophonist Joe Henderson and percussionist Don Alias.

== Reception ==
Professional ratings
Review scores
| Source | Rating |
|---|---|
| AllMusic | 4/5 stars |
| The Penguin Guide to Jazz Recordings | 3.5/4 stars |

Ron Wynn of AllMusic wrote that "Only some uneven material keeps his '92 album from being exceptional, and even on the weak songs, Garrett's playing forces you to pay attention."

== Track listing ==
All tracks are written by Kenny Garrett except where noted.

| No. | Title | Writer(s) | Length |
|---|---|---|---|
| 1. | "Tacit Dance" | | 6:08 |
| 2. | "Spanish-Go-Round" | | 4:08 |
| 3. | "Computer 'G'" | | 10:03 |
| 4. | "Van Gogh's Left Ear" | | 7:39 |
| 5. | "Black Hope" | | 3:51 |
| 6. | "Jackie & The Bean Stalk" | | 7:02 |
| 7. | "Run Run Shaw" | | 4:45 |
| 8. | "2 Step" | | 5:24 |
| 9. | "Bone Bop" | | 4:53 |
| 10. | "Books & Toys" | | 5:41 |
| 11. | "Bye Bye Blackbird" | Ray Henderson; Mort Dixon | 4:32 |
| 12. | "Last Sax" | | 1:34 |
| Total length: | | | 65:40 |

== Personnel ==
Musicians

- Kenny Garrett – alto saxophone (1–3, 6, 8, 10, 12), soprano saxophone (4, 5, 7, 9)
- Joe Henderson – tenor saxophone (1, 3, 11)
- Kenny Kirkland – acoustic piano (1, 2, 4–11), synthesizers (8, 9)
- Donald Brown – synthesizers (5, 8)
- Charnett Moffett – bass (1–11)
- Brian Blade – drums (1–7, 10, 11), cymbals (9)
- Ricky Wellman – drums (8, 9)
- Don Alias – percussion (1, 2, 4, 5, 7–9)

Technical

- Matt Pierson – executive producer
- Donald Brown – producer, mixing
- Joe Ferla – recording, mixing
- Kenny Garrett – mixing
- Chris Alberts – assistant engineer
- A.W. Dick – assistant engineer
- Bob Ludwig – mastering at Gateway Mastering (Portland, Maine)
- Bibi Green – production coordinator
- Mike Beard – computer host
- Linda Cobb – art direction, design
- Keith Schoenheit – photography (of flower)
- Chris Carroll – photography (of Garrett)
- Peter Shukat – management
