= Introducing Kenny Garrett =

Kenny Garrett

Studio album by Kenny Garrett Quintet
- Released: 1985
- Recorded: December 28, 1984
- Studio: Van Gelder Studio, Englewood Cliffs, New Jersey
- Genre: Jazz; post-bop
- Length: 55:34
- Label: Criss Cross Jazz; CRISS 1014 CD
- Producer: Gerry Teekens

Kenny Garrett chronology
Kenny Garrett (1985)	Garrett 5 (1989)

Professional ratings
Review scores
Source	Rating
AllMusic	3/5 stars
The Penguin Guide to Jazz Recordings	3/4 stars

Introducing Kenny Garrett is the debut album by American jazz saxophonist Kenny Garrett, recorded on December 28, 1984. It features Garrett in a quintet with veteran trumpeter Woody Shaw, pianist Mulgrew Miller, bassist Nat Reeves, and drummer Tony Reedus.

== Track listing ==
All tracks are written by Kenny Garrett except where noted.

No.	Title	Writer(s)	Length
1.	"For Openers"		6:27
2.	"Have You Met Miss Jones?"	Richard Rodgers; Lorenz Hart	9:19
3.	"A Silent Prayer"		8:03
4.	"Blues in the Afternoon"	Mulgrew Miller	4:00
5.	"Oriental Towaway Zone"		4:32
6.	"Until Tomorrow"		8:49
7.	"Reedus' Dance"		6:11
8.	"Lover"	Rodgers; Hart	8:13
Total length:			55:34

== Personnel ==
Musicians

- Kenny Garrett – alto saxophone
- Woody Shaw – trumpet, flugelhorn
- Mulgrew Miller – piano
- Nat Reeves – bass
- Tony Reedus – drums

Technical

- Gerry Teekens – producer
- Jerry Teekens – associate producer
- Rudy Van Gelder, Max Bolleman – engineer
- Leendert Stofbergen – cover design
- Stanley Crouch – liner notes
