= 2014 Soul Train Music Awards =

Music awards ceremony in Las Vegas, US

Soul Train Music Awards
- Date: November 30, 2014
- Location: Orleans Arena, Las Vegas, Nevada
- Country: United States
- Hosted by: Wendy Williams
- First award: 1987

Highlights
- Most awards: Chris Brown, Lil Wayne and Tyga (3)
- Website: soultrain.com

Television/radio coverage
- Network: BET, Centric

The 2014 Soul Train Music Awards was held at the Orleans Arena in Las Vegas, Nevada, on Centric and BET on November 30, 2014. The ceremony, hosted by media personality Wendy Williams, honored artists in 12 different categories. The nominees were announced October 13, 2014. R&B artist Chris Brown lead with seven nominations, including Best R&B/Soul Male Artist, Song of the Year, and Video of the Year. Beyoncé had six nominations, including Best R&B/Soul Female Artist, and Pharrell Williams has five nominations, including Best R&B/Soul Male Artist of the Year.

== Special awards ==
=== Legend Award ===
- Kool and the Gang

== Winners and nominees ==
Winners are in bold text.

=== Album of the Year ===
- **Beyoncé – Beyoncé**
  - Drake – Nothing Was the Same
  - Michael Jackson – Xscape
  - John Legend – Love in the Future
  - Janelle Monáe – The Electric Lady
  - Pharrell Williams – Girl

=== Song of the Year ===
- **Pharrell Williams – "Happy"**
  - Beyoncé (featuring Jay Z) – "Drunk in Love"
  - Chris Brown (featuring Lil Wayne and Tyga) – "Loyal"
  - Drake (featuring Majid Jordan) – "Hold On, We're Going Home"
  - Michael Jackson and Justin Timberlake – "Love Never Felt So Good"
  - John Legend – "All of Me"

=== Video of the Year ===
- **Pharrell Williams – "Happy**"
  - Jhené Aiko – "The Worst"
  - Aloe Blacc – "The Man"
  - Beyoncé (featuring Jay Z) – "Drunk in Love"
  - Chris Brown (featuring Usher and Rick Ross) – "New Flame"
  - Usher – "Good Kisser"

=== The Ashford & Simpson Songwriter's Award ===
- **John Legend – "All of Me"**
  - **Written by: John Stephens and Toby Gad**
- Jhené Aiko – "The Worst"
  - Written by: Jhené Aiko Chilombo, Mac Robinson and Brian Warfield
- Aloe Blacc – "The Man"
  - Written by: Egbert Dawkins III, Elton John, Bernie Taupin, Sam Barsh, Daniel Seeff and Khalil Abdul Rahman
- Beyoncé – "Pretty Hurts"
  - Written by: Joshua Coleman, Sia Furler, Beyoncé Knowles
- Sam Smith – "Stay with Me"
  - Written by: James Napier, William Phillips and Sam Smith
- Pharrell Williams – "Happy"
  - Written by: Pharrell Williams

=== Best R&B/Soul Male Artist ===
- **Trey Songz**
  - Chris Brown
  - Kem
  - John Legend
  - Tank
  - Pharrell Williams

=== Best R&B/Soul Female Artist (The Chaka Khan Award for Best R&B/Soul Female) ===
- **Beyoncé**
  - Jhené Aiko
  - Marsha Ambrosius
  - Jennifer Hudson
  - Ledisi
  - Janelle Monáe

=== Best New Artist ===
- **Nico & Vinz**
  - Jhené Aiko
  - August Alsina
  - Sevyn Streeter
  - Liv Warfield
  - Mack Wilds

=== Centric Award ===
- **Leela James**
  - AverySunshine
  - Robert Glasper
  - Kelis
  - Luke James
  - Shaliek

=== Best Gospel/Inspirational Song ===
- **Erica Campbell (featuring Lecrae) – "Help"**
  - Inspired People (featuring Charles Jenkins) – "Real Love"
  - Tamela Mann – "I Can Only Imagine"
  - Donnie McClurkin (featuring Tye Tribbett) – "We Are Victorious"
  - Smokie Norful – "No Greater Love"
  - Michelle Williams (featuring Beyoncé and Kelly Rowland) – "Say Yes"

=== Best Hip-Hop Song of the Year ===
- **Chris Brown (featuring Lil Wayne and Tyga) – "Loyal"**
  - Iggy Azalea (featuring Charli XCX) – "Fancy"
  - Drake (featuring Majid Jordan) – "Hold On, We're Going Home"
  - Nicki Minaj – "Pills n Potions"
  - Schoolboy Q (featuring BJ the Chicago Kid) – "Studio"
  - T.I. (featuring Iggy Azalea) – "No Mediocre"

=== Best Dance Performance ===
- **Chris Brown (featuring Lil Wayne and Tyga) – "Loyal"**
  - Jason Derulo (featuring 2 Chainz) – "Talk Dirty"
  - DJ Snake and Lil Jon – "Turn Down for What"
  - Janelle Monáe (featuring Solange) – "Electric Lady"
  - Tinashe (featuring Schoolboy Q) – "2 On"
  - Usher – "Good Kisser"

=== Best Collaboration ===
- **Chris Brown (featuring Lil Wayne and Tyga) – "Loyal"**
  - Toni Braxton and Babyface – "Hurt You"
  - Chris Brown (featuring Usher and Rick Ross) – "New Flame"
  - Robert Glasper (featuring Jill Scott) – "Calls"
  - Michael Jackson and Justin Timberlake – "Love Never Felt So Good"
  - Janelle Monáe (featuring Miguel) – "PrimeTime"

=== CENTRICTV.com Awards ===
==== Best Independent R&B/Soul Performance ====
- **Joe (featuring Kelly Rowland) – "Love & Sex Pt. 2"**
  - Terrace Martin (featuring TY$ and Tone Trezure) – "You're the One"
  - Sebastian Mikael (featuring Wale) – "Last Night""
  - Kelly Price – "It's My Time"
  - Shaliek – "The Past"
  - Liv Warfield – "Why Do You Lie?"

==== Best International Performance ====
- **Machel Montano – "Ministry of Road (M.O.R.)"**
  - Davido – "Aye"
  - Ziggy Marley – "I Don't Want to Live On Mars"
  - Nico & Vinz – "Am I Wrong"
  - Shaggy (featuring Ne-Yo) – "You Girl"
  - Sam Smith – "Stay with Me"

==== Best Traditional Jazz Performance ====
- **Wynton Marsalis – "Flee as a Bird to the Mountain"**
  - Monty Alexander – "Concierto de Aranjuez"
  - Kenny Garrett – "Pushing the World Away"
  - Audra McDonald – "What a Little Moonlight Can Do"
  - Gregory Porter – "Hey Laura"

==== Best Contemporary Jazz Performance ====
- **Liv Warfield – "Stay – Soul Lifted"**
  - Vandell Andrew – "Let's Ride"
  - Robert Glasper (featuring Jill Scott) – "Calls"
  - Terrace Martin (featuring Robert Glasper) – "It's Yours"
  - Najee (featuring Meli'sa Morgan) – "In the Mood to Take It Slow"
  - Snarky Puppy – "Lingus (We Like It Here)"

== Performers ==
- Chris Brown
- Jodeci
- Stephanie Mills
- Kem
- Ledisi
- Nico and Vinz
- Tinashe
- Trey Songz

=== Tribute performers ===
Kool and the Gang Tribute

- Tamar Braxton
- Yo Yo
- Missy Elliott
- Da Brat
- Total
- MC Lyte
- Lil Kim
