= Pursuance: The Music of John Coltrane =

Studio album by Kenny Garrett
- Released: 1996
- Recorded: 1996
- Genres: Jazz; post-bop
- Length: 65:08
- Labels: Warner Bros. WB 9 46209-2
- Producers: Kenny Garrett; Matt Pierson

Kenny Garrett chronology
Triology (1995)	Pursuance: The Music of John Coltrane (1996)	Songbook (1997)

Pursuance: The Music of John Coltrane is the seventh studio album by American jazz saxophonist Kenny Garrett, recorded in 1996 and released the same year by Warner Bros. Records. It features Garrett in a quartet consisting of guitarist Pat Metheny, bassist Rodney Whitaker, and drummer Brian Blade.

== Reception ==
Professional ratings
Review scores
Source	Rating
AllMusic	4.5/5 stars

Thom Owens of AllMusic stated, "Garrett creates a loving tribute, one that is respectful to Coltrane's legacy but one that doesn't mimic his sound. It's a moving record that reveals more layers every time you listen to it." Don Heckman, writing for the Los Angeles Times, described it as "a continually rewarding album".

The album won DownBeat Readers' Poll Jazz Album of the Year for 1997.

== Track listing ==
All tracks are written by John Coltrane except where noted.

No.	Title	Writer(s)	Length
1.	"Countdown"		3:42
2.	"Equinox"		7:38
3.	"Liberia"		7:33
4.	"Dear Lord"		5:53
5.	"Lonnie's Lament"		5:23
6.	"After the Rain"		7:21
7.	"Like Sonny"		6:13
8.	"Pursuance"		6:05
9.	"Alabama"		6:10
10.	"Giant Steps"		3:23
11.	"Latifa"	Blade; Garrett; Metheny; Whitaker	5:47
Total length:			65:08

== Personnel ==
Musicians

- Kenny Garrett – alto saxophone
- Pat Metheny – electric guitar
- Rodney Whitaker – double bass
- Brian Blade – drums

Technical

- Matt Pierson – producer
- Robin Burgess – associate producer
- James Farber – engineer, mixing
- Mark Larson – art direction
- Andrew Eccles – photography

== Charts ==
Chart	Peak position
US Top Jazz Albums (Billboard)	10
