= Tony Reedus =

American jazz musician (1959–2008)

- Born: September 22, 1959; Memphis, Tennessee, U.S.
- Died: November 16, 2008 (aged 49) New York City, U.S.
- Genre: Jazz
- Occupation: Musician
- Instrument: Drums
- Years active: 1981–2008
- Labels: Jazz City; Enja; Criss Cross; Sweet Basil
- Formerly of: Woody Shaw band

Tony Reedus (September 22, 1959 – November 16, 2008) was an American jazz drummer.

== Biography ==
Reedus was born in Memphis, Tennessee, in 1959. At age 14, he began playing the drums, soon joining his school band. His uncle, James Williams, a pianist for The Jazz Messengers, inspired him to play jazz. In 1978, he began attending Memphis State University, studying music and playing in local clubs. Trumpeter Woody Shaw asked Reedus to audition for his band in New York, following a performance at Blues Alley in Memphis, and in 1980, he left college to join Shaw's group.

Reedus first gained attention performing in Woody Shaw's band in 1981, remaining with the group until it disbanded in 1983. He has also played with Dave Stryker, Mulgrew Miller, Mike Nock, Kenny Garrett, Benny Golson, James Williams, and Anthony Wonsey, among others, and recorded five albums as a leader.

He noted his influences as drummers Art Blakey, Louis Hayes, Elvin Jones, Victor Lewis, Max Roach, Chick Webb, and Tony Williams.

Reedus died of a pulmonary embolism at John F. Kennedy International Airport at the age of 49. He had just returned from a tour in Italy with pianist Mike LeDonne.

== Discography ==
=== As leader ===
- The Far Side (Jazz City, 1988)
- Incognito (Enja, 1989)
- Minor Thang (Criss Cross, 1996)
- People Get Ready (Sweet Basil, 1998)

=== As sideman ===
With Joanne Brackeen

- Power Talk (Turnipseed, 1994)

With Robin Eubanks & Steve Turre

- Dedication (JMT, 1989)

With Kenny Garrett

- Introducing Kenny Garrett (Criss Cross, 1985)
- Garrett 5 (Paddle Wheel, 1989)
- African Exchange Student (Atlantic, 1990)

With Benny Golson

- Benny Golson Quartet Live (Dreyfus, 1989 [1991])
- Benny Golson Quartet (LRC Ltd., 1990)
- Domingo (Dreyfus, 1992)
- I Remember Miles (Alfa Jazz, 1993)

With Benny Green

- Prelude (Criss Cross, 1988)

With Geoff Keezer

- Waiting in the Wings (Sunnyside, 1989)
- With Our Own Eyes (Novus, 1993)

With Harold Mabern

- Mabern's Grooveyard (DIW, 1996)
- Maya with Love (DIW, 2000)

With Ronnie Mathews

- Selena's Dance (Timeless, 1988)

With Mulgrew Miller

- Wingspan (Landmark, 1987)
- Time and Again (Landmark, 1991)

With Dick Oatts

- Gratitude (SteepleChase, 2007)

With Woody Shaw

- United (Columbia, 1981)
- Lotus Flower (Enja, 1982)
- Master of the Art (Elektra Musicia, 1982)
- Night Music (Elektra Musicia, 1982)
- The Time Is Right (Red, 1983)

With Jim Snidero

- Tippin' (Savant, 2007)

With James Spaulding

- The Smile of the Snake (HighNote, 1997)

With Walt Weiskopf Quintet

- Anytown (Criss Cross, 1998)

With Anthony Wonsey

- Blues for Hiroshi (Sharp Nine, 2004)
