= Nat Reeves =

American jazz bassist

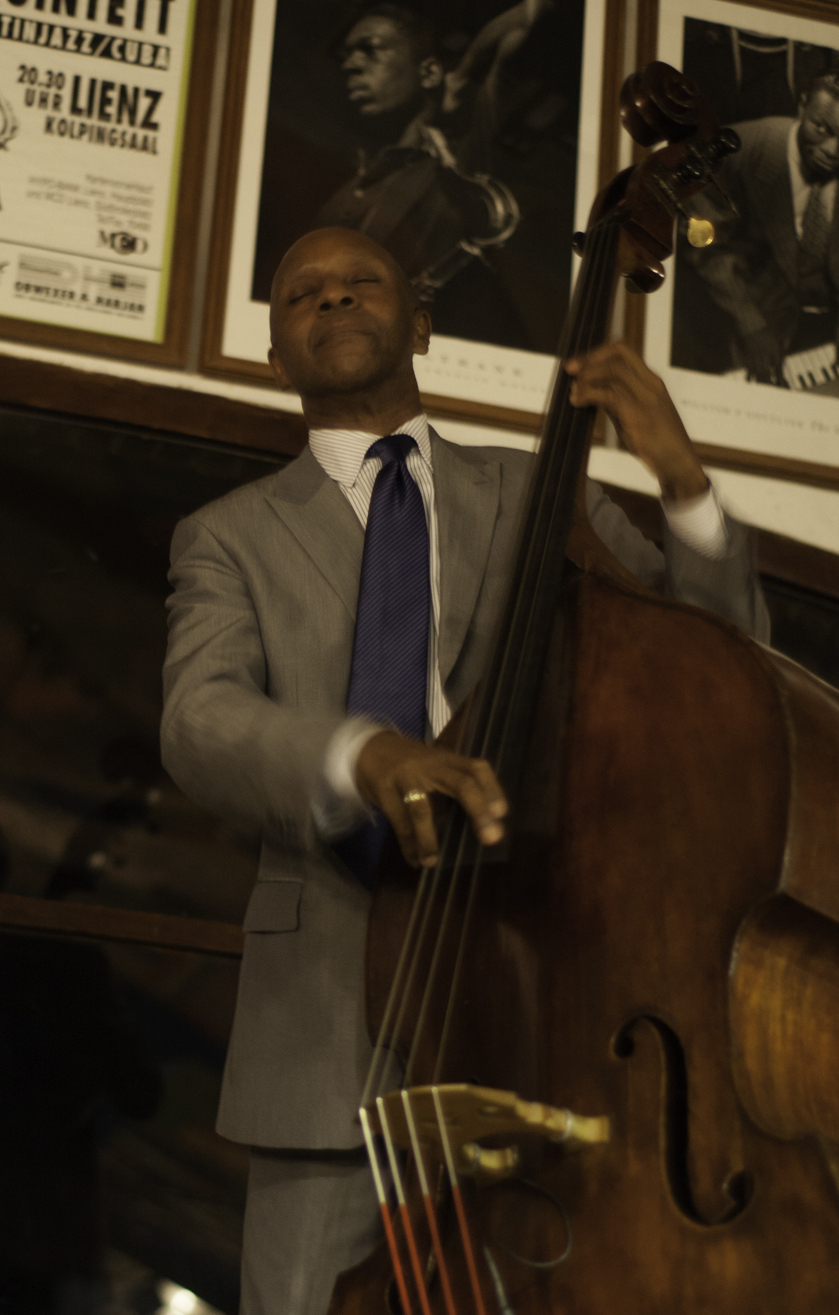
- Reeves in 2013

Background information
- Born: May 27, 1955 (age 71); Virginia, U.S.
- Genres: Jazz
- Occupations: Musician; educator
- Instrument: Double bass
- Years active: 1982–present
- Website: natreeves.com

Nat Reeves (born May 27, 1955) is an American jazz bassist. He resides in Hartford, Connecticut, and teaches at The Hartt School of the University of Hartford. He also performs internationally with a number of jazz artists.

== Band leaders ==
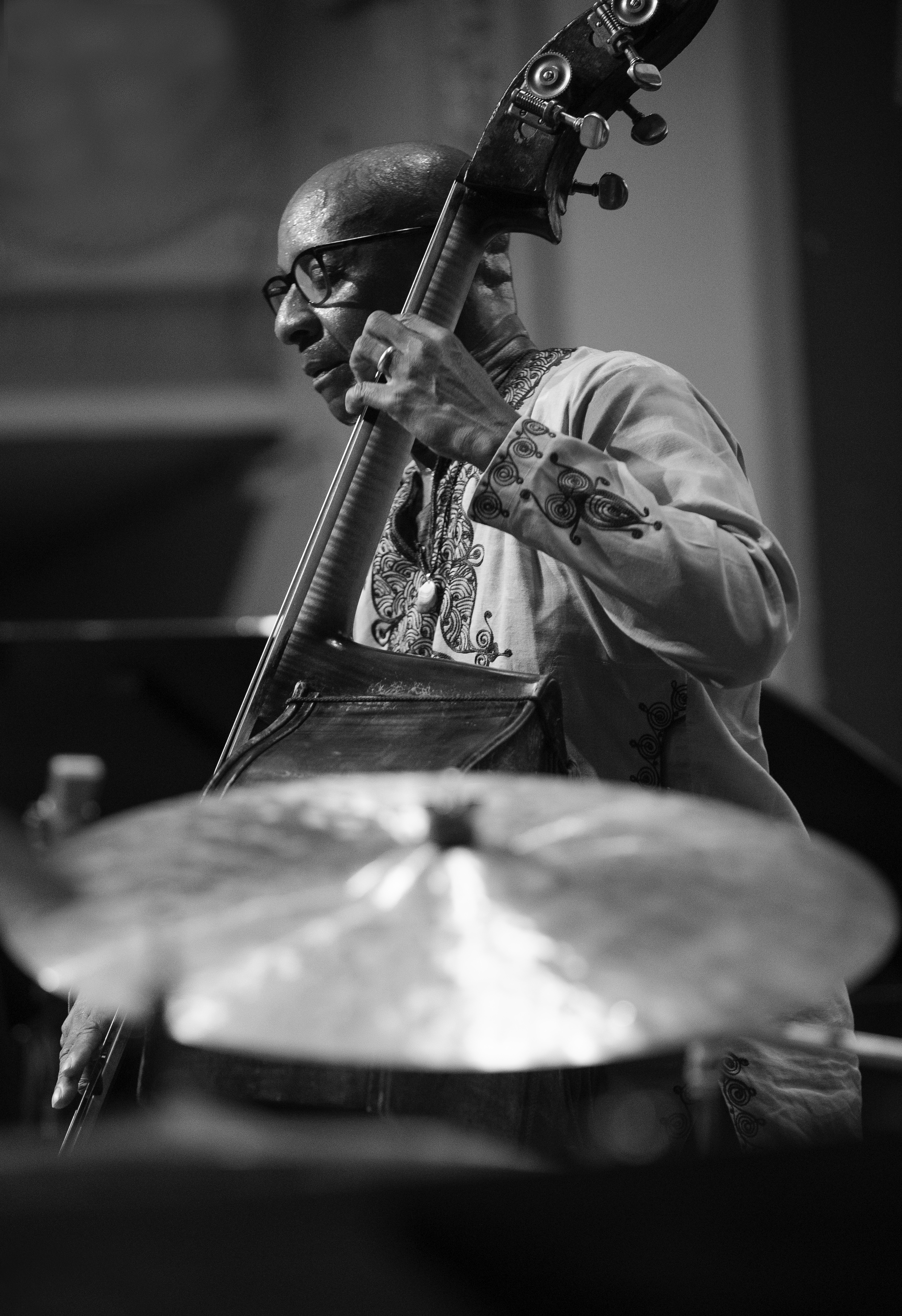
Nat Reeves, Arts for Art - Vision Festival 2024. Photo by Marek Lazarski

Reeves has worked with Jackie McLean, Kenny Garrett, Joe Farnsworth, and others.

== Discography ==
=== As leader ===
- State of Emergency (482 Music, 2012)
- Blue Ridge (Side Door, 2018)

=== As sideman ===
With Eric Alexander

- Live at the Keynote (Skip, 1999)
- It’s All in the Game (HighNote, 2006)
- Temple of Olympic Zeus ((HighNote, 2007)
- Revival of the Fittest (HighNote, 2009)
- Don't Follow the Crowd (HighNote, 2011)
- Recado Bossa Nova (Venus, 2015)

With Steve Davis

- Crossfire (Criss Cross, 1998)
- Portrait in Sound (Stretch, 2000)
- Dig Deep (Criss Cross, 2004)
- Update (Criss Cross, 2006)
- Alone Together (Mapleshade, 2007)
- Eloquence (Jazz Legacy, 2009)
- Gettin' It Done (PosiTone, 2012)
- For Real (PosiTone, 2014)
- Say When (Smoke Sessions, 2015)

With Joe Farnsworth

- Beautiful Friendship (Criss Cross, 1999)
- Drumspeak (CMD, 2006)
- Super Prime Time (Eighty Eight, 2012)
- My Heroes: Tributes to the Legends (Venus, 2014)

With Kenny Garrett

- Introducing Kenny Garrett (Criss Cross Jazz, 1984)
- Songbook (Warner Bros., 1997)
- Simply Said (Warner Bros., 1999)
- Seeds from the Underground (Mack Avenue, 2012)

With David Hazeltine

- Good-Hearted People (Criss Cross, 2001)
- The Jobim Songbook (Chesky, 2007)

With Randy Johnston

- Jubilation (Muse, 1992 [1994])
- Somewhere in the Night (HighNote, 1997)
- Homage (JCurve, 2000)
- Hit and Run (HighNote, 2002)

With Harold Mabern

- Kiss of Fire (Venus, 2002)
- Don't Know Why (Venus, 2003)
- To Love and Be Loved (Smoke Sessions, 2017)

With Steve McCraven

- Sound of the Forest Boogaraboo (World McMusic, 1994) with Archie Shepp
- Bosco (EF Mic, 1996) with Archie Shepp and Arthur Blythe

With Jackie McLean

- Dynasty (Triloka, 1988)
- Rites of Passage (Triloka, 1991)
- The Jackie Mac Attack (Dreyfus, 1991)
- Rhythm of the Earth (Dreyfus, 1992)
- Hat Trick (Somethin' Else/Blue Note, 1996)
- Montreal ’88 (Hi Hat, 2018)

With Saori Yano

- Yano Saori (JRoom Jazz, 2003)
- O2 (JRoom, 2004)

With others

- Mary DiPaola, Cat’s Cradle (Brownstone, 1997)
- Tom McClung, The Telling (Terieva, 1997)
- Mike DiRubbo, From the Inside Out (Sharp Nine, 1999)
- Dakota Staton, A Packet of Love Letters (HighNote, 1999)
- Michael Musillami, Archives (Playscape, 2001)
- Laird Jackson, Touched (Cap, 2002)
- Jesse van Ruller, Here and There (Criss Cross, 2002)
- Anthony Wonsey, The Thang (Sharp Nine, 2006)
- Diana Perez, It's Happenin' (Zoho, 2008)
- Javon Jackson and We Four, Celebrating John Coltrane (Solid Jackson, 2012)
- John Webber, Down for the Count (Cellar Live, 2014)
- Jacques Lesure, Camaraderie WJ3, 2015)
- Rene McLean, Ancestral Calling: Music of the Spirit (I'Jazza, 2017)
- Jim Snidero & Jeremy Pelt, Jubilation (Savant High Note, 2018)
- Jim Snidero, Waves of Calm (Savant, 2019)
