= Donald Brown (musician) =

American jazz pianist and producer (born 1954)

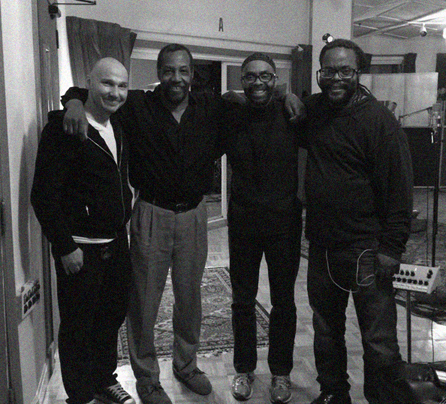
- Svoy, Brown, Kenny Garrett & Vernell Brown, Jr. at Sear Sound Recording, NYC

Background information
- Born: Donald Ray Brown; March 28, 1954 (age 72); Hernando, Mississippi, U.S.
- Education: Memphis State University
- Genres: Jazz
- Occupations: Music producer, musician
- Instrument: Piano
- Years active: 1972–2020
- Labels: Muse, Sunnyside, Evidence, Space Time
- Website: Official website

Donald Ray Brown (born March 28, 1954) is an American jazz pianist and producer.

== Biography ==
Brown was born in Hernando, Mississippi, and was raised in Memphis, Tennessee, where he learned to play trumpet and drums in his youth. From 1972 to 1975, he was a student at Memphis State University, by which time he had made piano his primary instrument. He was with Art Blakey's Jazz Messengers from 1981 to 1982, then took teaching positions at Berklee College of Music from 1983 to 1985 and the University of Tennessee from 1988. Brown has recorded for Evidence, Muse, and Sunnyside.

== Discography ==
=== As leader/co-leader ===
Recording date	Title	Label	Year released	Personnel/Notes
1987–06	Early Bird	Sunnyside	1988	Sextet, with Bill Mobley (trumpet, flugelhorn), Donald Harrison (flute), Steve Nelson (vibraphone), Bob Hurst (bass), Jeff "Tain" Watts (drums)
1988–06	The Sweetest Sounds	Jazz City	1989	Quartet, with Steve Nelson (vibraphone), Charnett Moffett (bass), Alan Dawson (drums)
1989–08	Sources of Inspiration	Muse	1990	Quintet, with Eddie Henderson (trumpet, flugelhorn), Gary Bartz (soprano sax, alto sax), Buster Williams (bass), Carl Allen (drums)
1990–03	People Music	Muse	1991	With Tom Harrell (trumpet, flugelhorn), Vincent Herring (flute, soprano sax, alto sax), Steve Nelson (vibraphone), Robert Hurst (bass), Samurai Celestial (drums, vocals), Daniel G. Sadownick (percussion); Lenora Helm (vocals) added on one track
1991–04	Cause and Effect	Muse	1992	With Joe Henderson (tenor sax), James Spaulding (flute), Steve Nelson (vibraphone, marimba), Ron Carter (bass), Carl Allen, Kenny Washington (drums), Rudy Bird, Donald Eaton (percussion), Marlon Saunders and Lenora Helm (vocals)
1992–06	Send One Your Love	Muse	1994	With Steve Wilson (flute, soprano sax, alto sax), Tom Williams (flugelhorn), Charnett Moffett (bass), Eric Walker and Louis Hayes (drums; separately), Rudy Bird (percussion)
1993–09	Cartunes	Muse	1995	With Don Braden (flute, tenor sax), Steve Wilson (soprano sax, alto sax), Bill Mobley (trumpet, flugelhorn), Steve Nelson (vibraphone), Carl Allen (drums, tambourine), Rudy Bird (percussion), Harold Mabern (vocals)
1995–02	Piano Short Stories	Space Time	1996	Live solo piano
1995–03	Wurd on the Street	Space Time	1998	With Bill Mobley (trumpet, flugelhorn), Manny Boyd (alto saxophone, soprano saxophone, flute), Sam Newsome (tenor saxophone, soprano saxophone), Essiet Essiet (bass), Billy Drummond (drums), Daniel Sadownick (percussion)
1997–07	The Classic Introvert	Space Time	2004	Solo piano
1998–01	Enchanté!	Space Time	1998	With Stephane Belmondo (trumpet, flugelhorn), Bill Easley (alto sax, flute, clarinet), Steve Nelson (vibraphone), Essiet Essiet (bass), Billy Higgins (drums), Daniel Sadownick (percussion)
1999–03	French Kiss	Space Time	2002	Quintet, with Jérôme Barde (guitar), Essiet Essiet (bass), Billy Kilson (drums), Angá Diaz (percussion)
2000–05	Autumn in New York	Space Time	2002	Trio, with Essiet Essiet (bass), Billy Kilson (drums)
2000–05	At This Point in My Life	Space Time	2001	Septet, with Bill Mobley (trumpet, flugelhorn), Jean Toussaint (soprano sax, tenor sax), Jérôme Barde (guitar), Essiet Essiet (bass), Billy Kilson (drums), Angá Diaz (percussion)
2008?	Fast Forward to the Past	Space Time	2008	With Bill Mobley (trumpet, flugelhorn), Steve Nelson (vibes), Danny Walsh (flute, alto sax, tenor sax), Jean Toussaint (soprano sax, tenor sax), Lionel Loueke and Mark Boling (guitar), Robert Hurst and Essiet Essiet (bass), Eric Harland and Kenny Brown (drums)
2013?	Born to Be Blue	Space Time	2013	With Kenny Garrett (alto sax, soprano sax), Wallace Roney (trumpet), Ravi Coltrane (tenor sax, soprano sax), Emily Mathis (flute), Vance Thompson (flugelhorn), Mark Boling (guitar), Robert Hurst (bass), Marcus Gilmore and Kenneth Brown (drums; separately), Rudy Bird (percussion)

Omnibus

- With Harold Mabern and Charles Thomas trios, A Season of Ballads (Space Time, 1997)

=== As a member ===
Continuum
(With Bill Mobley, Billy Kilson, Essiet Essiet, Gary Bartz and Jean Toussaint)

- Act One (Space Time, 2004)

=== As sideman ===
With Art Blakey

- Killer Joe with George Kawaguchi (Union Jazz, 1981)
- Keystone 3 (Concord Jazz, 1982)
- Feeling Good (Delos, 1986)

With Donald Byrd

- Getting Down to Business (Landmark, 1989)
- A City Called Heaven (Landmark, 1991)

With others

- Ricky Ford, Tenor Madness Too! (Muse, 1992)
- Wallace Roney, Obsession (Muse, 1990)

=== As producer ===
With Kenny Garrett

- African Exchange Student (Atlantic, 1990)
- Black Hope (Warner Bros., 1992)
- Triology (Warner Bros. 1995)
- Songbook (Warner Bros., 1997)
- Seeds from the Underground (Mack Avenue, 2012)
- Pushing the World Away (Mack Avenue, 2013)
- Do Your Dance! (Mack Avenue, 2016)
- Sounds from the Ancestors (Mack Avenue, 2021)

With others

- Scott Tixier, Cosmic Adventure (Sunnyside, 2016)
