= Kenny Garrett =

American jazz musician and composer (born 1960)

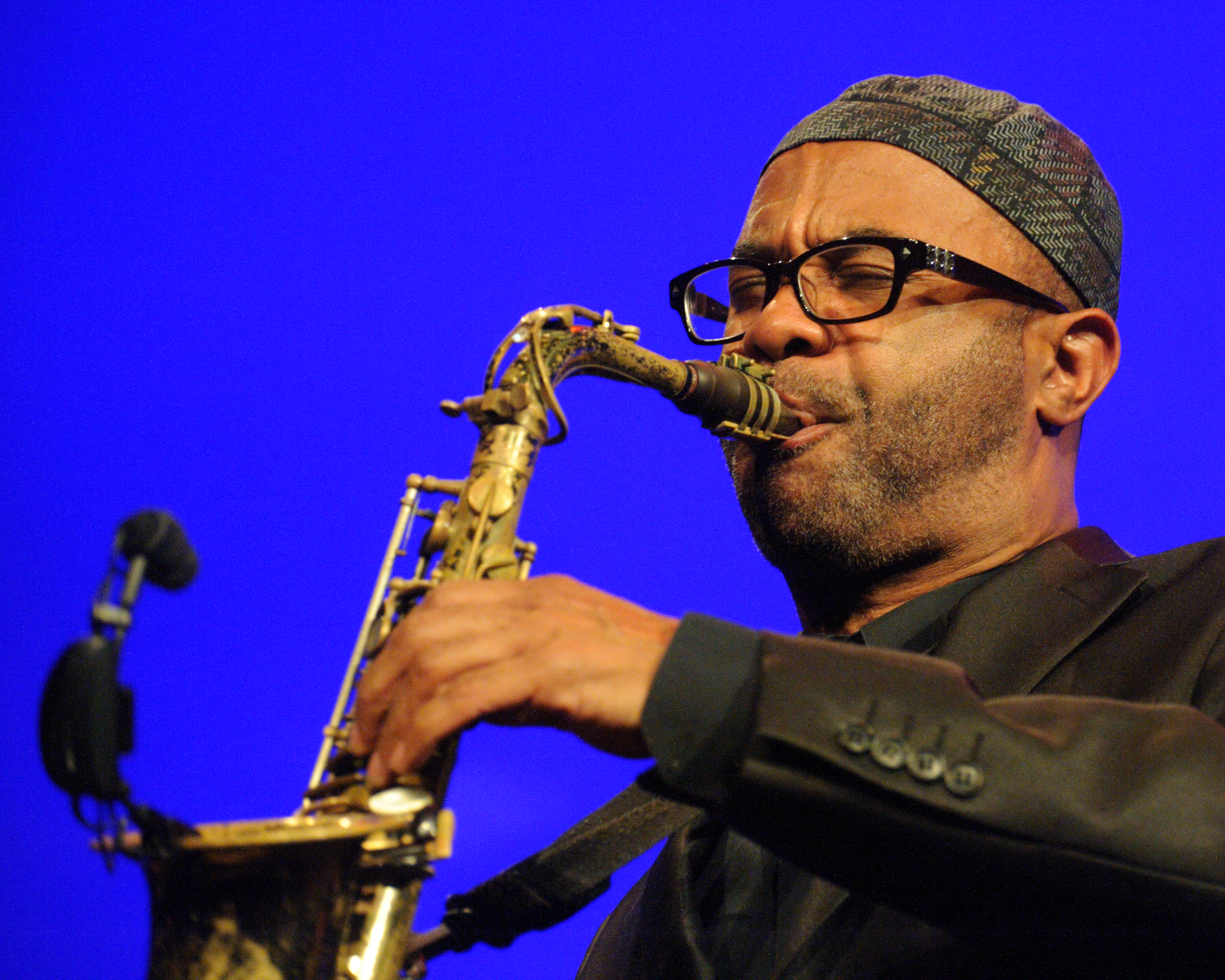
- Garrett performing in 2013

Background information
- Born: October 9, 1960 (age 65); Detroit, Michigan, U.S.
- Genres: Jazz; post-bop; jazz fusion
- Occupation: Musician
- Instruments: Alto saxophone; soprano saxophone; flute; piano
- Years active: 1978–present
- Labels: Atlantic Jazz; Warner Bros.; Mack Avenue; Criss Cross Jazz
- Formerly of: Five Peace Band; Miles Davis; Woody Shaw; The Jazz Messengers; Marcus Miller
- Website: www.kennygarrett.com

Kenny Garrett (born October 9, 1960) is an American post-bop jazz musician and composer who gained recognition in his youth as a member of the Duke Ellington Orchestra and for his time with Miles Davis's band. Garrett's primary instruments are alto and soprano saxophone and flute. Since 1985, he has pursued a solo career.

== Biography ==
Kenny Garrett was born in Detroit, Michigan, on October 9, 1960. He attended Mackenzie High School. His father was a carpenter who played tenor saxophone as a hobby. Garrett's own career as a saxophonist took off when he joined the Duke Ellington Orchestra, under the leadership of Mercer Ellington, in 1978. Garrett also played and recorded with Art Blakey, Miles Davis, Freddie Hubbard, and Woody Shaw before developing his career as a leader.

In 1984, Garrett recorded his first album as a bandleader, Introducing Kenny Garrett, on the Criss Cross label. During that year, he became the founding member of the ensemble Out of the Blue, which was produced by Blue Note Records. In 1986, Garrett became a member of Art Blakey's Jazz Messengers.

Garrett signed to the Warner Bros. Records label, and beginning with Black Hope in 1992, he recorded eight albums for them. His music sometimes exhibits Asian influences, an aspect that is especially prevalent in his 2006 Grammy-nominated recording Beyond the Wall.

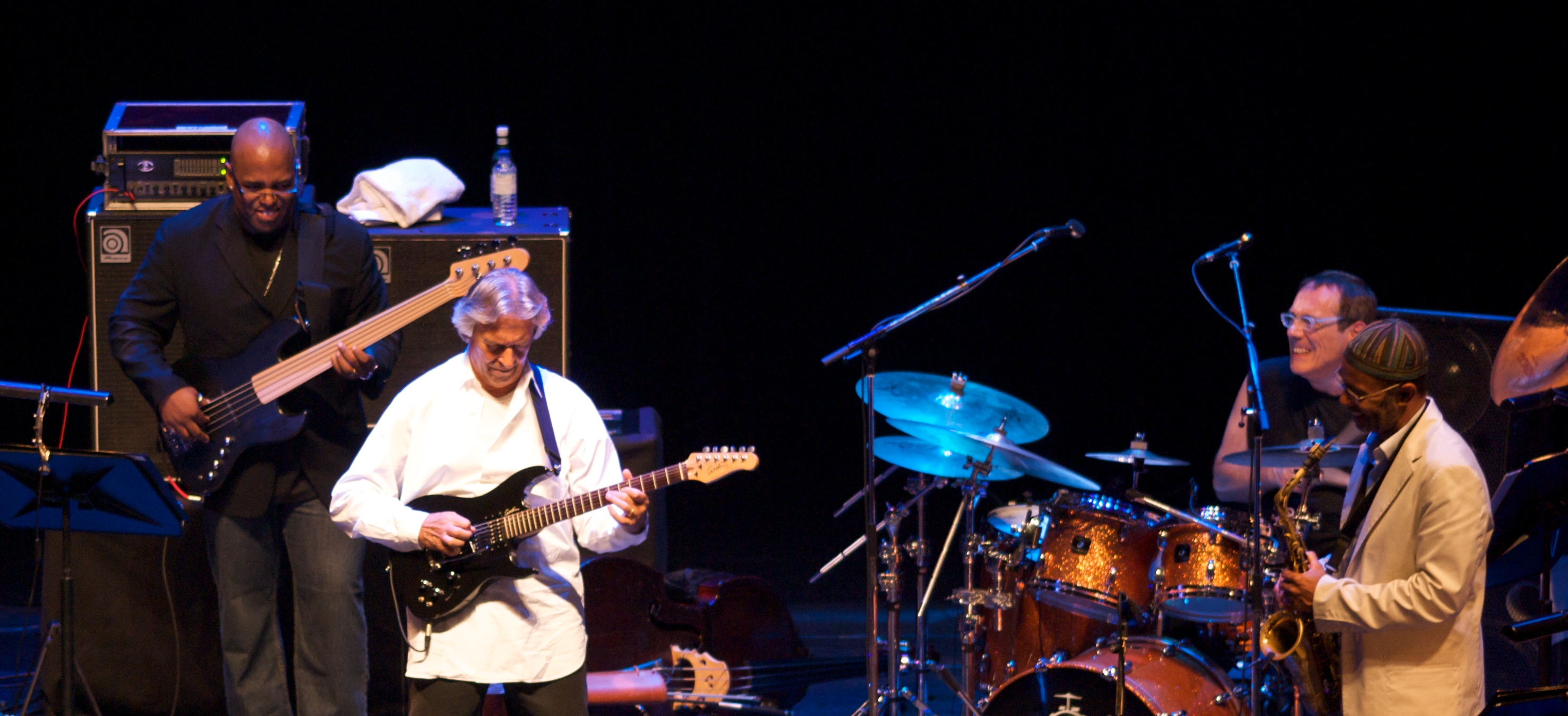
Five Peace Band in 2008. From left: Christian McBride, John McLaughlin, Vinnie Colaiuta, and Garrett.

Garrett joined the "Five Peace Band" of Chick Corea, John McLaughlin, Christian McBride, and Brian Blade/Vinnie Colaiuta around 2008. The CD Five Peace Band – Live won a Grammy Award in 2010.

In 2011, Garrett was presented with an Honorary Doctorate in Music from Berklee College of Music, in Boston, Massachusetts. Garrett also was the Commencement Speaker for graduates.

In 2012, Garrett received a Soul Train Music Award nomination for his 2012 studio album Seeds from the Underground in the Best Traditional Jazz Artist/Group category. Also in 2012, Grammy nominations for Seeds from the Underground followed in the Best Jazz Instrumental Album and Best Improvised Jazz Solo categories, and Seeds From The Underground received an NAACP Image Award nomination in the Outstanding Jazz Album category. In 2013, Garrett won an Echo Award in the Saxophonist of the Year category.

Garrett's album Pushing the World Away received a Grammy nomination in the Best Jazz Instrumental Album category in 2013. He followed with Do Your Dance! (2016), Sounds from the Ancestors (2021) and released his first electronic album, Who Killed AI? (2024), in collaboration with electronic producer/instrumentalist Svoy.

== Honors ==
- 2011: Honorary Doctorate of Music from Berklee College of Music, Commencement Speaker
- 2023: NEA Jazz Masters Fellowship
- 2023: Chevalier de l'ordre des Arts et des Lettres, Ministère de la Culture, République de France

== Influence ==
Garrett was described as the "most important alto saxophonist of his generation" by the Washington City Paper and "one of the most admired alto saxophonists in jazz after [Charlie] Parker" by The New York Times.

== Discography ==
=== As leader/co-leader ===
- Introducing Kenny Garrett (Criss Cross, 1985) – rec. 1984
- Garrett 5 (Paddle Wheel, 1989) – rec. 1988
- Prisoner of Love (Atlantic, 1989)
- African Exchange Student (Atlantic, 1990)
- Black Hope (Warner Bros., 1992)
- Stars & Stripes (Jazz Door, 1995) – bootleg (unofficial) album
- Triology (Warner Bros., 1995)
- Pursuance: The Music of John Coltrane (Warner Bros., 1996)
- Songbook (Warner Bros., 1997)
- Simply Said (Warner Bros., 1999)
- Happy People (Warner Bros., 2002)
- Standard of Language (Warner Bros., 2003)
- Beyond the Wall (Nonesuch, 2006)
- Sketches of MD: Live at the Iridium (Mack Avenue, 2008) – live
- Seeds from the Underground (Mack Avenue, 2012)
- Pushing the World Away (Mack Avenue, 2013)
- Do Your Dance! (Mack Avenue, 2016)
- Sounds from the Ancestors (Mack Avenue, 2021)
- Who Killed AI? with Svoy (Mack Avenue, 2024)

As leader of General Music Project (G. M. Project)
(Co-leader with Charnett Moffett)

- General Music Project (Sweet Basil/Apollon, 1994) – with Charles Moffett and Geri Allen
- Blacker (Sweet Basil, 1997) – with Charles Moffett and Cyrus Chestnut
- General Music Project II (Evidence, 1998) – with Charles Moffett and Cyrus Chestnut
- Mr. J.P. (Videoarts Music, 2001) – with Louis Hayes and Carlos McKinney

Compilations

- Old Folks with John Scofield, Michael Brecker and David Friesen (West Wind, 1999)
- Casino Lights '99 (Warner Bros., 2000) – live at Montreux Jazz Festival
- Various artists, Relief: A Benefit for the Jazz Foundation of America's Musicians' Emergency Fund (Mack Avenue, 2021)

=== As a member ===
Out of the Blue

- Out of the Blue (Blue Note, 1985) – with Michael Philip Mossman, Ralph Bowen, Harry Pickens, Robert Hurst and Ralph Peterson, Jr.
- Inside Track (Blue Note, 1986) – with Mossman, Bowen, Pickens, Hurst and Peterson
- Live at Mt. Fuji (Blue Note, 1987) – live rec. at the Mount Fuji Jazz Festival 1986 at Lake Yamanaka, Japan. with Mossman, Bowen, Pickens, Peterson and Kenny Davis.

Art Blakey and The Jazz Messengers

- Feeling Good (Delos Productions, 1986)

The Duke Ellington Orchestra

- Music is My Mistress (Musicmasters, 1989)

Manhattan projects
(With Carl Allen, Roy Hargrove, Donald Brown and Ira Coleman)

- Dreamboat (Timeless, 1990) – rec. 1989

=== As sideman ===
With Donald Byrd

- 1987: Harlem Blues (Landmark, 1988)
- 1989: Getting Down to Business (Landmark, 1990)

With Chick Corea

- Remembering Bud Powell (Stretch, 1997) – Grammy nominated
- Five Peace Band Live with John McLaughlin (Concord, 2009)[2CD] – Grammy won
- The Musician (Concord Jazz, 2017)[3CD]

With Miles Davis

- 1988-1989: Amandla (Warner Bros., 1989)
- 1990: Dingo (Warner Bros., 1991)
- 1988–1991: Live Around the World (Warner Bros., 1996) – live
- 1991: Miles & Quincy Live at Montreux (Warner Bros., 1993) – live
- 1991: Merci Miles! Live at Vienne (Rhino/Warner, 2021) – live

With Roy Haynes

- Praise (Dreyfus Jazz, 1998)
- Birds of a Feather: A Tribute to Charlie Parker (Dreyfus Jazz, 2001) – Grammy nominated

With Freddie Hubbard

- Double Take with Woody Shaw (Blue Note, 1985)
- The Eternal Triangle with Woody Shaw (Blue Note, 1987)
- Topsy – Standard Book (alfa, 1990) – rec. 1989

With Marcus Miller

- The Sun Don't Lie (Dreyfus, 1993)
- Tales (Dreyfus, 1995)
- Live & More (GRP, 1997) – live rec. 1996
- M² (Telarc, 2001)
- Dreyfus Night in Paris with Michel Petrucciani (Dreyfus Jazz, 2003) – live rec. 1994

With Mulgrew Miller

- Wingspan (Landmark, 1987)
- Hand in Hand (Novus, 1993) – rec. 1992

With Charnett Moffett

- Beauty Within (Blue Note, 1989)
- Evidence (Telarc, 1993)

With Woody Shaw

- Double Take with Freddie Hubbard (Blue Note, 1985)
- The Eternal Triangle with Freddie Hubbard (Blue Note, 1987)

With Mike Stern

- These Times (ESC, 2003)
- All Over the Place (Heads Up International, 2012) – rec. 2011

With Jeff "Tain" Watts

- Citizen Tain (Columbia, 1999)
- Detained at The Blue Note (Half Note, 2004) – live

With others

- Geri Allen, The Nurturer (Blue Note, 1991)
- Clifton Anderson, Decade (Doxy, 2008)
- Cindy Blackman, Arcane (Muse, 1987)
- Terence Blanchard, Romantic Defiance (Columbia, 1995)
- Richard Bona, Munia: The Tale (Verve, 2003) – 1 track
- Cameo, Machismo (Atlanta Artists, 1988)
- Dennis Chambers, Planet Earth (BHM Productions, 2005)
- Cyrus Chestnut, A Charlie Brown Christmas (Atlantic, 2000)
- Foley, 7 Years Ago ... Directions In Smart-Alec Music (MoJazz, 1993)
- Guru, Guru's Jazzmatazz, Vol. 2: The New Reality (Chrysalis, 1995)
- Bobby Hutcherson, Skyline (Verve, 1999)
- Javon Jackson, When The Time Is Right (Blue Note, 1994)
- Al Jarreau, Tenderness (Reprise, 1994) - live
- Rodney Kendrick, The Secrets of Rodney Kendrick (Verve, 1993)
- Christian McBride, Number Two Express (verve, 1996)
- John McLaughlin ans Chick Corea, Five Peace Band Live (Concord, 2009) – Grammy won
- Meshell Ndegeocello, The Spirit Music Jamia: Dance of the Infidel (Universal Music, 2005)
- Q-Tip, Kamaal the Abstract (Battery, 2009)
- Tony Reedus & Urban Relations, People Get Ready (Sweet Basil, 1998)
- Wallace Roney, Intuition (Muse, 1988)
- Philippe Saisse, Masques (Verve Forecast, 1995)
- John Scofield, Works for Me (Verve, 2001)
- Woody Shaw, Solid (Muse, 1987)
- Patches Stewart, Blow (Koch, 2005)
- Stephen Scott, The Beautiful Thing (Verve, 1997)
- Sting, If on a Winter's Night... (Deutsche Grammophon, 2009) – 1 track
- Wayman Tisdale, Power Forward (Motown, 1995)
- Steve Turre, Rainbow People (HighNote, 2008)
- Jack Walrath, Master of Suspense (Blue Note, 1987)
- Cedar Walton, Cedar Walton Plays (Delos, 1987)
- Lenny White, Present Tense (Hip Bop, 1995)
- Larry Willis, My Funny Valentine (Jazz City, 1988)
- Akiko Yano, Elephant Hotel (Epic, 1994) – 1 track

== Publications ==
- The Kenny Garrett Collection. Artist Transcriptions. Milwaukee, Wisconsin, United States: Hal Leonard Corp. 2004.
- Kenny Garrett. Jazz Play-Along. Vol. 153. Milwaukee, Wisconsin, United States: Hal Leonard Corp. 2016.

== Awards and nominations ==
Year	Result	Award	Category	Work
1996	Won	DownBeat Readers Poll	Alto Saxophone	
1997	Won	DownBeat Readers Poll	Alto Saxophone	
1997	Won	DownBeat Readers Poll	Jazz Album of the Year	Pursuance: The Music of John Coltrane
1998	Nominated	Grammy Award	Best Jazz Instrumental Performance	Chick Corea – Remembering Bud Powell
1998	Nominated	Grammy Award	Best Jazz Instrumental Performance	Songbook
1998	Won	DownBeat Readers Poll	Alto Saxophone	
1999	Won	DownBeat Readers Poll	Alto Saxophone	
2002	Nominated	Grammy Award	Best Jazz Instrumental Album	Roy Haynes – Birds of a Feather: A Tribute to Charlie Parker
2007	Nominated	Grammy Award	Best Jazz Instrumental Album	Beyond the Wall
2009	Won	DownBeat Readers Poll	Alto Saxophone	
2010	Won	DownBeat Readers Poll	Alto Saxophone	
2010	Won	Grammy Award	Best Jazz Instrumental Album	Chick Corea & John McLaughlin Five Peace Band – Five Peace Band Live
2012	Nominated	NAACP Image Award	Outstanding Jazz Album	Seeds from the Underground
2012	Nominated	Soul Train Awards	Best Traditional Jazz Artist/Group	Seeds from the Underground
2012	Won	DownBeat Readers Poll	Alto Saxophone	
2013	Nominated	Grammy Award	Best Jazz Instrumental Album	Seeds from the Underground
2013	Nominated	Grammy Award	Best Improvised Jazz Solo	"J. Mac" on Seeds from the Underground
2013	Won	Echo Award	Best International Jazz Saxophone Performance	Seeds from the Underground
2013	Nominated	JJA Jazz Awards	Alto Saxophonist of the Year	
2013	Won	DownBeat Readers Poll	Alto Saxophone	
2014	Nominated	Grammy Award	Best Jazz Instrumental Album	Pushing the World Away
2014	Nominated	Soul Train Awards	Best Traditional Jazz Performance	Pushing the World Away
2014	Won	DownBeat Critics Poll	Alto Saxophone	
2014	Won	DownBeat Readers Poll	Alto Saxophone	
2017	Won	DownBeat Readers Poll	Alto Saxophone	
2019	Won	DownBeat Readers Poll	Alto Saxophone	

== Chart positions ==
Chart	Peak position	Work
Billboard Top Jazz Albums (1989)	20	Prisoner of Love
Billboard Top Jazz Albums (1990)	5	African Exchange Student
Billboard Top Jazz Albums (1992)	6	Black Hope
Billboard Top Jazz Albums (1995)	22	Triology
Billboard Top Jazz Albums (1996)	10	Pursuance: The Music of John Coltrane
Billboard Top Jazz Albums (1997)	7	Songbook
Billboard Top Jazz Albums (1999)	20	Simply Said
Billboard Top Jazz Albums (2002)	19	Happy People
Billboard Top Jazz Albums (2003)	11	Standard of Language
Billboard Top Jazz Albums (2006)	13	Beyond the Wall
Billboard Top Jazz Albums (2008)	11	Sketches of MD: Live at the Iridium
Billboard Top Jazz Albums (2012)	10	Seeds from the Underground
Billboard Top Jazz Albums (2013)	6	Pushing the World Away
Billboard Top Jazz Albums (2016)	24	Do Your Dance!
