= Geoffrey Himes =

American music critic

Geoffrey Himes is an American music critic who wrote for the Washington Post from 1977 to 2021. He also wrote for No Depression as a contributing editor in its first print era in the late 1990s to the early 2000s and has written for Paste since 2004. He has written lyrics for songs that have been recorded by multiple artists, including Billy Kemp & the Paradise Rockers and Mojo Filter. He has won the Deems Taylor Award from the American Society of Composers, Authors and Publishers four times (in 2002, 2005, 2014, and 2016).

== Books ==
- Born in the U.S.A. (a book about Bruce Springsteen's album of the same name; part of the 33⅓ series) (Bloomsbury Publishing, 2005)
- Willie Nelson: All the Albums (a book about Willie Nelson's 100-plus albums) (Quarto / Motorbooks, 2025)
