= Vernell Brown Jr. =

American jazz/R&B pianist and composer

- Born: Vernell Brown Jr. August 13, 1971
- Origin: Los Angeles, California, U.S.
- Died: May 23, 2022 (aged 50) Las Vegas, Nevada, U.S.
- Genre: Jazz
- Occupation: Musician
- Instrument: Piano
- Years active: 1989 – 2022
- Label: A&M
- Formerly of: Kenny Garrett, Donald Brown, Corcoran Holt, Ronald Bruner Jr., Ernie Watts, Marcus Miller, John Pattitucci, Neil Stubenhause, Paul Jackson Jr., Pat Kelley, Stix Hooper, Vinnie Colaiuta, Lenny Castro, Herb Alpert, Craig T. Cooper, Terry Trotter, Charlie Shoemake, Gladys Knight, Jeffrey Osborne, Ronnie Laws, Windy Karigianes, Mike Clark, Paul Jackson.
- Website: Official website

Vernell Brown Jr. (August 13, 1971 – May 23, 2022) was a jazz and rhythm and blues pianist, composer, arranger.

== Early life ==
Starting early in life opened a path to becoming a life-long musician; even as a child Vernell practiced frequently, was surrounded by other musicians, chose his own instruments, and began taking lessons. Vernell started playing piano as a 4 year-old, drums from age 3 to 13. Vernell picked up the violin when he was 8 and focused on that instrument until high school, but continued with the piano throughout.

In high school Vernell studied with composer and pianist Terry Trotter and renowned jazz vibraphonist Charlie Shoemake, under whose tutelage Vernell developed quickly. He was recognized by Yamaha and gifted a grand piano and several other keyboards. He was a finalist at the 1988 and 1989 Thelonious Monk Institute of Jazz Piano Competitions.

Vernell was discovered as a teenager when he performed as a substitute pianist at the Recording Academy "Grammy In The Schools" program. The chance substitution brought Vernell to the attention of the co-founder of A&M Records, Jerry Moss who contracted Vernell.

== Career ==
As an 18-year old recording his debut album A Total Eclipse, Vernell had the opportunity to play alongside veterans like saxophonist Ernie Watts, bassist Marcus Miller, John Pattitucci, Neil Stubenhause, guitarists Paul Jackson Jr., and Pat Kelley, drummers Stix Hooper and Vinnie Colaiuta, percussionist Lenny Castro, and trumpeter and A&M Records co-founder Herb Alpert. Producer Stix Hooper, a founding member of The Jazz Crusaders, wrote, "This debut album of Vernell Brown Jr., is an artistic contribution to our planet of significant musical depth, vision and direction. Vernell at the young age of eighteen, has been given from the Supreme Source, the talent, wisdom, and creative skills necessary to communicate to us, music we can incorporate into our lives." Vernell then released the album Stay Tuned on A&M, taking a more aggressive route, playing with his own band The Nucleus; two tracks, "Whoever You Are" and "Everybody Needs A Friend", features a vocal collaboration with lyricist Will Jennings.

Vernell collaborated with various musicians, including Herb Alpert, Jeffrey Osborne, Ronnie Laws, and extensively with Gladys Knight starting in 1994, touring in Europe and the United States. He then recorded Just For You (1994) with Gladys and enjoyed a two-year performance show at the Flamingo Hilton Hotel on the Las Vegas Strip, listed as the number one show on the strip for a four-year period. Just for You was nominated for the 1995 Grammy.

In 1994, Vernell teamed with LA Music Awards nominee Windy Karigianes to co-write "Butterfly", featuring Herbie Hancock's Headhunters Mike Clark and Paul Jackson; it became a hit single. He also appeared on releases by Craig T. Cooper on Caught Up in a Moment (1999) and by Ronnie Laws on A Tribute to the Legendary Eddie Harris (1997) and Dream a Little (2000).

In 2002, Vernell joined the Kenny Garrett Quintet, with which he recorded Happy People (2002), Standard of Language (2003), Standard of Language (2003), Pushing the World Away (2013), Do Your Dance! (2016), and Sounds from the Ancestors (2021). With the quintet, Vernell traveled the world, averaging 40 venues a month and performing at many international jazz festivals. In his downtime, Vernell worked with developing youth musicians and led a workshop at the Las Vegas Academy for the Arts.

In 2018 Vernell began putting down his explorations on paper, resulting in the book The Alpha Pattern Method; A Theory of Composition and Improvisation.

Before his death in 2022, Vernell was working on a studio recording project consisting of a compilation of original materials composed and collected over many years.

== Discography ==
=== As leader ===
- A Total Eclipse (A&M, 1990)
- Stay Tuned (A&M, 1992)
- 13 Letters (Verlita Records, 2010)
- Do You Really Love Me (Vernell Brown Jr., 2010)

=== As sideman ===
With Ronnie Laws

- Tribute to the Legendary Eddie Harris (Blue Note, 1997)
- Dream a Little (HDH, 2000)
- Ronnie Laws – Live! In Concert (Scepterstein Records, 2001)

With Gladys Knight

- Just For You (MCA Records, 1994)

With Kenny Garrett

- Happy People (Warner Bros., 2002)
- Standard of Language (Warner Bros., 2003)
- Pushing the World Away (Mack Avenue, 2013)
- Do Your Dance! (Mack Avenue, 2016)
- Sounds from the Ancestors (Mack Avenue, 2021)

Other guest appearances with

- Craig T. Cooper – Whatever Happens In Vegas, Stays In Vegas (from, Nasty Man, 2011)
- Kaylene Peoples – A-Tisket, A-Tasket (from, My Man, 2015)
