= Charnett Moffett =

American jazz bassist (1967–2022)

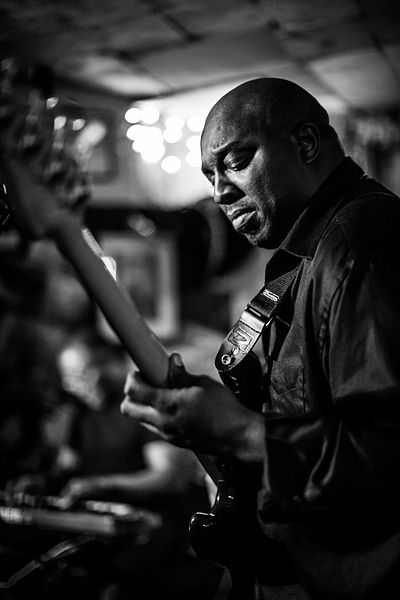
- Moffett at 55 Bar in New York City

Background information
- Born: June 10, 1967; New York City, U.S.
- Died: April 11, 2022 (aged 54) Stanford, California, U.S.
- Genres: Jazz; world music
- Occupation: Musician
- Instrument: Bass
- Years active: 1983–2022
- Labels: Blue Note; Manhattan; Evidence; Motéma
- Website: charnettmoffettbass.net

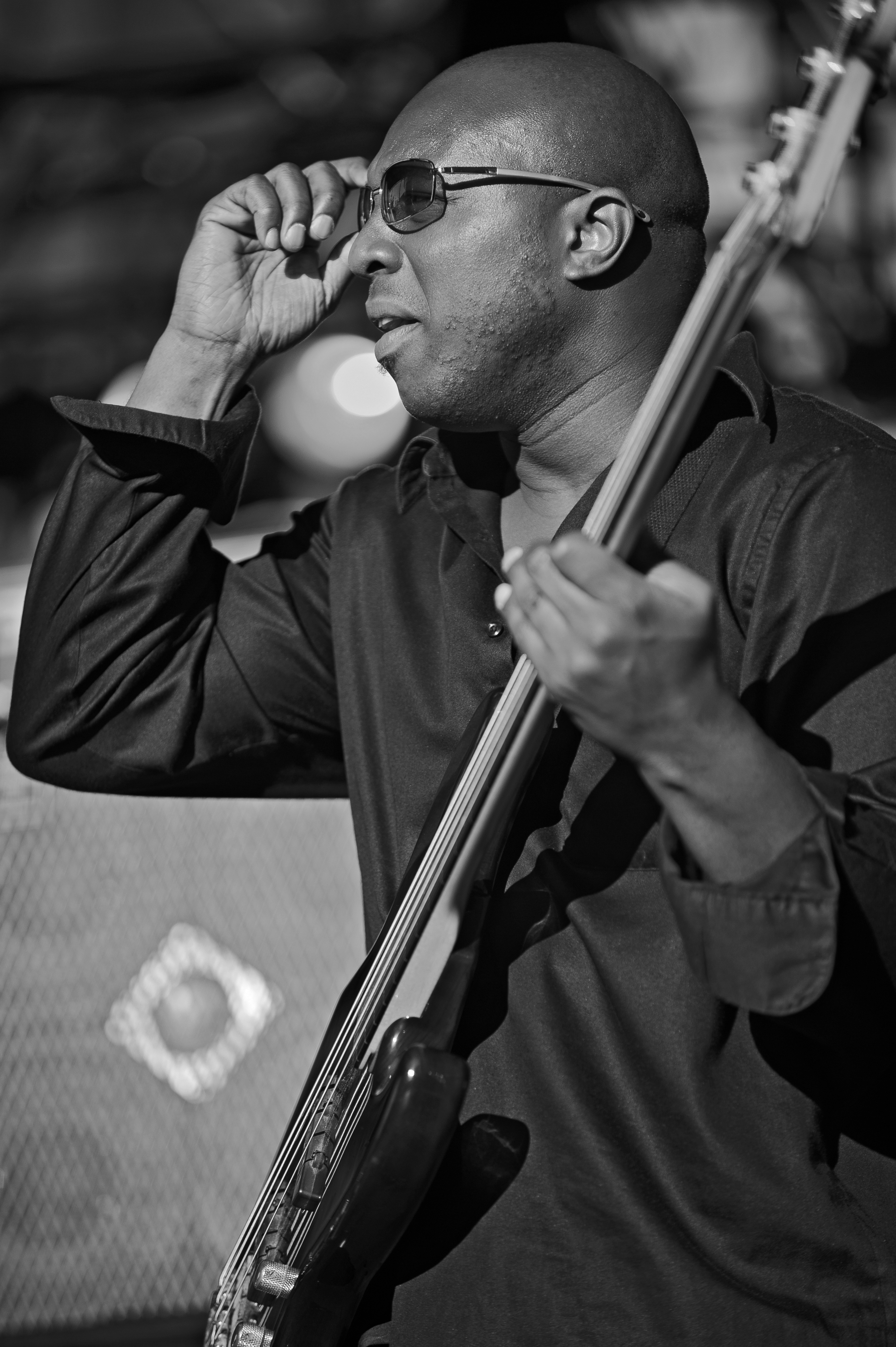
Charnett Moffett at the Detroit International Jazz Festival

Charnett Moffett (June 10, 1967 – April 11, 2022) was an American jazz bassist and composer. He was an apparent child prodigy. Moffett began playing bass in the family band, touring the Far East in 1975 at the age of eight. In the mid-1980s, he played with Wynton Marsalis and Branford Marsalis.

In 1987, he recorded his debut album Netman for Blue Note Records. He worked with Art Blakey, Ornette Coleman, Pharoah Sanders, Dizzy Gillespie, Ellis Marsalis, Sonny Sharrock, Stanley Jordan, Wallace Roney, Arturo Sandoval, Courtney Pine, David Sanborn, David Sánchez, Dianne Reeves, Frank Lowe, Harry Connick, Jr., Herbie Hancock, Joe Henderson, Kenny Garrett, Kenny Kirkland, Kevin Eubanks, Lew Soloff, Manhattan Jazz Quintet, Melody Gardot, Mulgrew Miller and Tony Williams.

== Early life and career ==
Charnett Moffett attended Fiorello H. LaGuardia High School of Music & Art and Performing Arts in New York City and later studied at Mannes College of Music and the Juilliard School of Music. In 1983, he played on saxophonist Branford Marsalis' debut as a leader, Scenes in the City, and the following year he joined trumpeter Wynton Marsalis’ quintet, appearing on 1985's Grammy-winning Black Codes (From the Underground). During the 1980s, Moffett also worked with Stanley Jordan, appearing on the guitarist's best-selling 1985 Blue Note debut, Magic Touch, as well as two Blue Note albums with drummer Tony Williams’ quintet: 1987's Civilization and 1988's Angel Street. In 1987, Moffett signed with Blue Note and debuted as a leader that year with his first of three albums for the label, NetMan (1987) which featured Michael Brecker, Kenny Kirkland and Al Foster. His second Blue Note release, Beauty Within (1989) was a family affair featuring his father Charles Moffett on drums, older brothers Mondre Moffett on trumpet, Charles Moffett, Jr on tenor sax, Codaryl Moffett on drums, and his sister Charisse on vocals. Also featured were Kenny Garrett on alto saxophone, and Stanley Jordan on guitar. His third Blue Note release, Nettwork (1991), produced by Kenny Kirkland, especially focused on Moffett's piccolo bass and electric bass work.

In 1993, Moffett recorded Rhythm & Blood for Sweet Basil's Apollon Records. A mix of jazz and pop, it placed high on the music charts in Japan. He later scored artistic triumphs on the Evidence label with 1994's Planet Home (featuring his electronically enhanced rendition of "The Star-Spangled Banner" in tribute to Jimi Hendrix's Woodstock showstopper) and 1997's Still Life, featuring keyboardist Rachel Z and drummer Cindy Blackman. Starting in 1993 for several years Moffett was widely acclaimed for his innovative performances as a member of Pharoah Sanders' touring band. In 1996, Moffett appeared on two simultaneous releases by Ornette Coleman — Sound Museum: Hidden Man and Sound Museum: Three Women. Another 1997 recording, Acoustic Trio for Teichiku Records, showcased Moffett's acoustic bass playing. Three other '90s recordings for the Sweet Basil/Evidence label were done under the collective name of General Music Project (with saxophonist Kenny Garrett, pianists Geri Allen and Cyrus Chestnut, drummer Charles Moffett Sr, his father, known for his famous work with Ornette Coleman. Another recording from 1995, Moffett & Sons, is a collaboration with his father. In 2001, Moffett released a tribute to the late Jaco Pastorius entitled Mr. P, a trio recording with pianist Mulgrew Miller and drummer Lewis Nash. He also performed on various movie soundtracks, including acclaimed ensemble cast pictures Glengarry Glen Ross (1992) and The Visit (2001), and was a featured soloist on Howard Shore's score for The Score (starring Robert De Niro and Marlon Brando).

=== Later career ===
In 2008, Moffett signed with Motéma Music releasing The Art of Improvisation in May 2009 and Treasure in June 2010. The Art of Improvisation was his Motéma debut (and his eighth recording as a leader), overdubbing electric bass guitar, piccolo bass and acoustic upright bass. Joined by drummers Will Calhoun and Eric McPherson and Tibetan vocalist Yungchen Lhamo, the release references Asian and Middle Eastern influences.

Treasure (2010), while sharing some of the Asian and Middle Eastern influences of The Art of Improvisation, has an emphasis on the swing and pulse for which Moffett has become known. The release, while his second on Motéma, marked his eleventh as a leader. Once again on Treasure, he uses his three-pointed bass method to express his distinct musicality: his upright acoustic bass, his fretless electric bass and his electric piccolo bass. The Making of Treasure, a documentary directed and narrated by Moffett, is included as enhanced content on the CD. Treasure was also released by King Records in Japan and by Membran International in the EU.

Moffett worked in duo with Jana Herzen on her sophomore release Passion of A Lonely Heart (October 2012), playing the upright bass and electric bass.

In 2013, he released The Bridge: Solo Bass Works and Spirit of Sound, both on Motéma Music. To celebrate his thirtieth year as a recording artist, Moffett released his first live album, Music From Our Soul, also on Motéma, featuring his long time jazz compatriots Pharoah Sanders, Stanley Jordan, Cyrus Chestnut, Jeff "Tain" Watts, Victor Lewis and Mike Clarke.

In 2019, Moffett released Bright New Day in collaboration with the members of his touring band, violinist Scott Tixier, keyboardist Brian Jackson, drummer Mark Whitfield, Jr, and singer/guitarist Jana Herzen.

== Death ==
Moffett died at Stanford University Hospital on April 11, 2022, due to a heart attack. He was 54.

== Discography ==
=== As leader/co-leader ===
- Net Man (Blue Note, 1987)
- Beauty Within (Blue Note, 1989)
- Nettwork (Manhattan, 1991)
- Rhythm & Blood (Sweet Basil, 1994)
- Planet Home (Evidence, 1995) – rec. 1993–1994
- Still Life (Evidence, 1997)
- Acoustic Trio (Sweet Basil, 1998) – rec. 1997
- For the Love of Peace (Piadrum, 2004)
- Internet (Piadrum, 2006)
- The Art of Improvisation (Motema, 2009)
- Treasure (Motema, 2010)
- Spirit of Sound (Motema, 2013)
- The Bridge (Motema, 2013)
- Music from Our Soul (Motema, 2017)
- Bright New Day (Motema, 2019)
- Round the World (Motema, 2020)
- New Love (Motema, 2021)

As leader of General Music Project (G. M. Project)
(Co-leader with Kenny Garrett)

- General Music Project (Sweet Basil/Apollon, 1994) – with Charles Moffett and Geri Allen
- Blacker (Sweet Basil, 1997) – with Charles Moffett and Cyrus Chestnut
- General Music Project II (Evidence, 1998) –with the same musicians
- Mr. J.P. (VideoArts, 2001) – with Louis Hayes and Carlos McKinney

=== As a member ===
Manhattan Jazz Quintet

- Manhattan Jazz Quintet (Paddle Wheel, 1984)
- Autumn Leaves (Paddle Wheel, 1985)
- Concierto De Aranjuez (Sweet Basil, 1994)
- The Original Voice (Sweet Basil, 1995)
- Teen Town (VideoArts, 2002)
- Come Together (Videoarts, 2005)
- Tribute to Art Blakey (Birds, 2009)
- Autumn in New York (Paddle Wheel, 2015)
- La Fiesta (Paddle Wheel, 2015)
- Take Five (Paddle Wheel, 2015)

=== As sideman ===
With Kenny Drew Jr.

- The Rainbow Connection (Evidence, 1988)
- The Flame Within (Jazz City, 1989)
- A Look Inside (Antilles, 1993)

With Kenny Garrett

- Garrett 5 (Paddle Wheel, 1989) - rec. 1988
- Prisoner of Love (Atlantic, 1989)
- African Exchange Student (Atlantic, 1990)
- Black Hope (Warner Bros., 1992)
- Stars & Stripes Live (Jazz Door, 1994)
- Triology (Warner Bros., 1995)
- Old Folks with John Scofield, Michael Brecker and David Friesen (West Wind, 1999)
- Happy People (Warner Bros., 2002) - rec. 2001
- Standard of Language (Warner Bros., 2003)

With Stanley Jordan

- Magic Touch (Blue Note, 1985)
- Cornucopia (Blue Note, 1990)
- Stolen Moments (Blue Note, 1991)
- Live in New York (Blue Note, 1998)
- New Morning (Inakustik, 2008)
- State of Nature (Mack Avenue, 2008)

With Donald Brown

- The Sweetest Sounds (Jazz City, 1989)
- Send One Your Love (Muse, 1994)

With Kevin Eubanks

- Turning Point (Blue Note, 1992)
- Live (Insoul Music, 2001)

With Ornette Coleman

- Sound Museum: Hidden Man (Verve, 1996)
- Sound Museum: Three Women (Verve, 1996)

With Branford Marsalis

- Scenes in the City (Columbia, 1984)
- Royal Garden Blues (CBS, 1986)

With Mulgrew Miller

- Work! (Landmark, 1986)
- Wingspan (Landmark, 1987)

With Courtney Pine

- Within the Realms of Our Dreams (Antilles, 1991)
- Modern Day Jazz Stories (Antilles, 1995)

With Rachel Z

- Trust the Universe (Columbia, 1993)
- Room of One's Own (NYC, 1996)

With Dianne Reeves

- The Nearness of You (Blue Note, 1988)
- I Remember (Blue Note, 1991)

With Wallace Roney

- Verses (Muse, 1987)
- The Standard Bearer (Muse, 1989)

With Howard Shore

- The Score (Varese Sarabande, 2001)
- Maps to the Stars (Howe, 2014)

With John Stubblefield

- Bushman Song (Enja, 1986)
- Countin' On the Blues (Enja, 1987)

With McCoy Tyner

- Land of Giants (Telarc, 2003)
- Afro Blue (Telarc, 2007) - compilations
- Trio Live in Gdynia (AC Records, 2021)

With Sadao Watanabe

- Parker's Mood - Sadao Watanabe Live at Bravas Club '85 (Elektra, 1985)
- Tokyo Dating (Elektra, 1985)

With Tony Williams

- Civilization (Blue Note, 1987)
- Angel Street (Blue Note, 1988)

With others

- Anita Baker, Rhythm of Love (Atlantic, 1994)
- David Benoit, Letter to Evan (GRP, 1992)
- Alex Bugnon, This Time Around (Orpheus, 1993)
- Ronnie Burrage, Shuttle (Sound Hills, 1994)
- Will Calhoun, Life in This World (Motema, 2013)
- Tommy Campbell, My Heart (Jazz City, 1989)
- Harry Connick Jr., Come by Me (Columbia, 1999)
- Robin Eubanks, Dedication ( (JMT, 1989)
- Herbie Hancock, Future 2 Future (Columbia, 2001)
- Jana Herzen, Nothing But Love (Motema, 2020)
- Vince Jones, One Day Spent (EMI, 1990)
- Julian Joseph, Reality (EastWest, 1993)
- Michael Kamen, The Last Boy Scout (La-La Land, 2015)
- Geoff Keezer, Curveball (Sunnyside, 1990)
- Kenny Kirkland, Kenny Kirkland (GRP, 1991)
- Frank Lowe, Decision in Paradise (Soul Note, 1985)
- Wynton Marsalis, Black Codes (From the Underground) (Columbia, 1985)
- Harvey Mason, With All My Heart (Videoarts, 2003)
- Codaryl Moffett, Evidence (Telarc, 1993)
- David Murray, Geri Allen & Terri Lyne Carrington, Perfection (Motema, 2016)
- Tony Reedus, The Far Side (Jazz City, 1989)
- David Sanchez, Street Scenes (Columbia, 1996)
- Pharoah Sanders, Message from Home (Verve, 1995)
- Arturo Sandoval, I Remember Clifford (GRP, 1992)
- Sonny Sharrock, Ask the Ages (Axiom, 1991)
- Sonny Simmons, Ancient Ritual (Qwest, 1994)
- Lew Soloff, Yesterdays (King, 1986)
- James Williams, Meet the Magical Trio (EmArcy, 1989)
