= Rudy Bird =

American drummer and percussionist

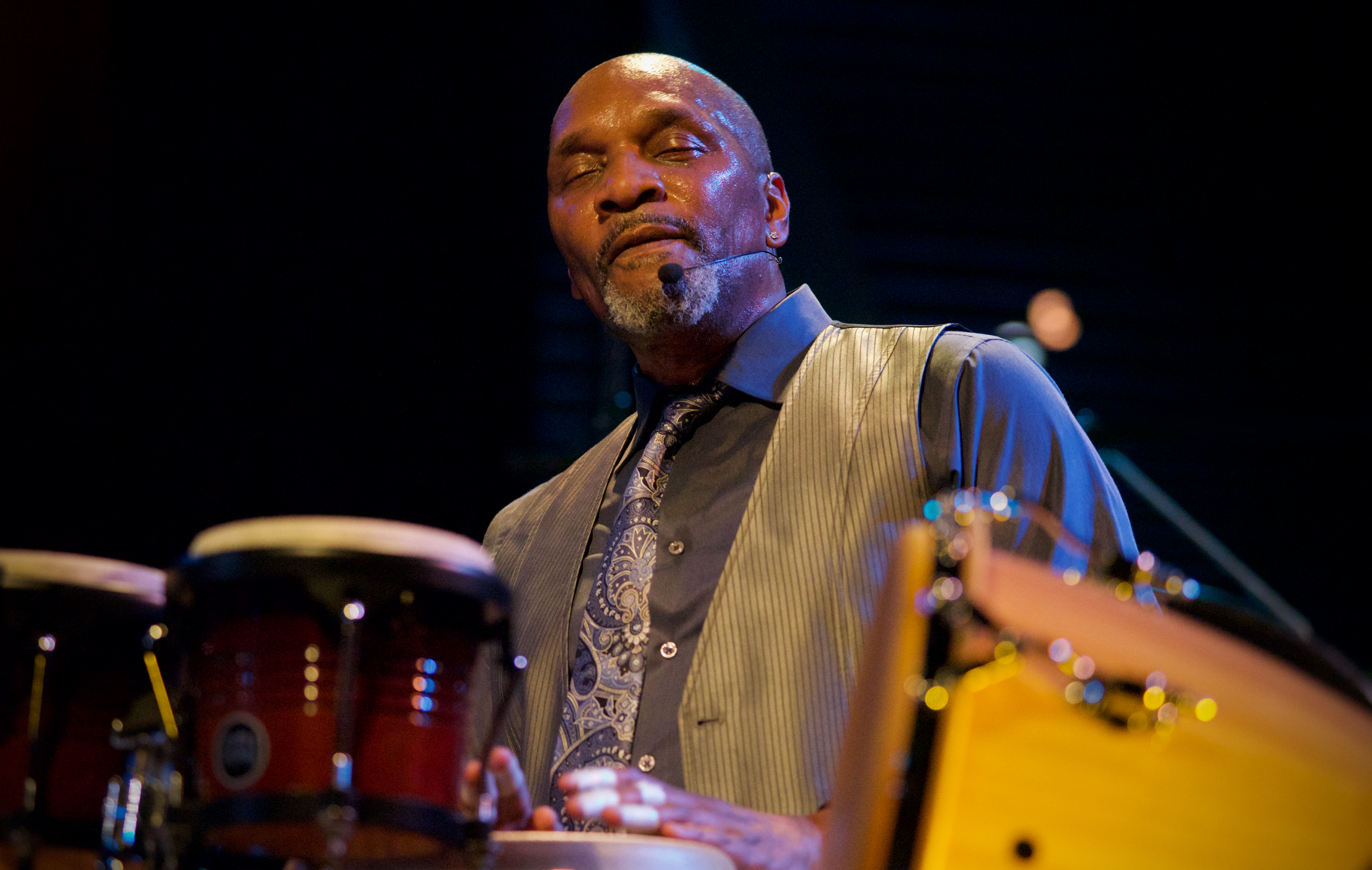
- Bird in February 2020

Background information
- Occupation: Musician
- Instruments: Drums; percussion

Rudolph Bird is a drummer and percussionist with over thirty years of experience as a stage and studio musician. He has toured throughout the United States, Europe, Asia, and Africa with many musicians including Miles Davis, the Duke Ellington Orchestra, Lauryn Hill, Kenny Garrett, Dance Theatre of Harlem, and Leela James. Bird is often requested for studio work and is featured on the albums of Amy Winehouse, Joss Stone, Nas, Leela James, Hill's award-winning album The Miseducation of Lauryn Hill, and Michael Jackson's posthumously released album, Michael. Bird has taught drums and percussion in New York and New Jersey at Dance Theatre of Harlem, Harlem School of the Arts, The Institute of Music for Children, and Essex County College for grades six through twelve (middle school through high school).
