= Benny Golson discography =

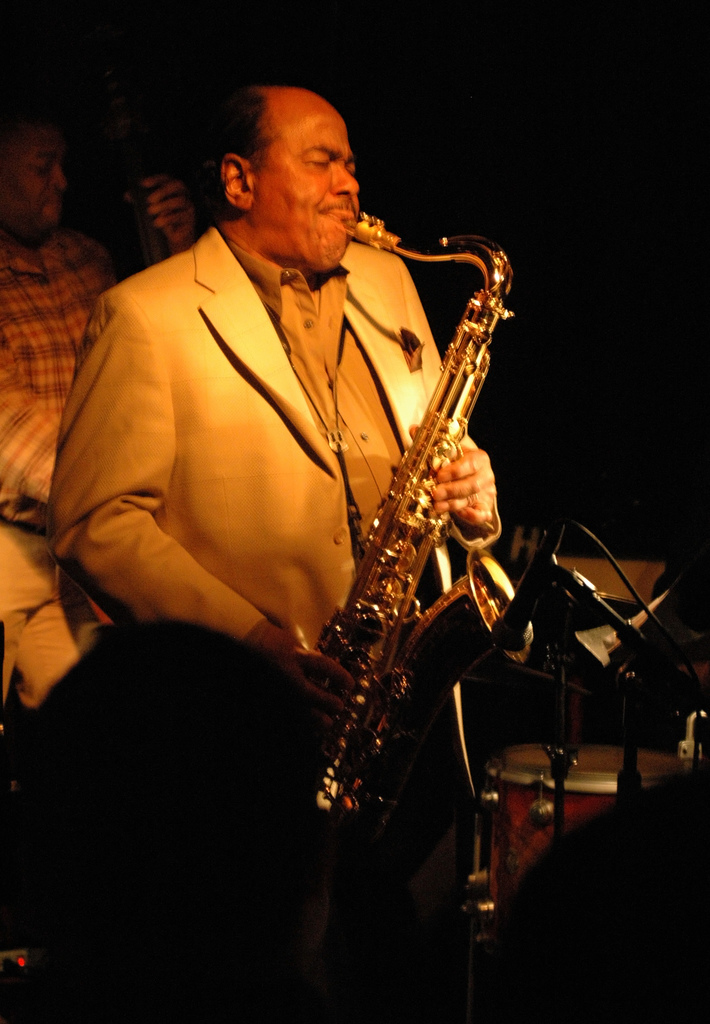
Benny Golson at 106th and Broadway, NYC, March 11, 2006

This is the discography for American jazz musician Benny Golson.

== As leader ==
- The Modern Touch (Riverside, 1958) – recorded in 1957
- The Other Side of Benny Golson (Riverside, 1958)
- Benny Golson and the Philadelphians (United Artists, 1958)
- Benny Golson's New York Scene (Contemporary, 1959) – recorded in 1957
- Gone with Golson (New Jazz, 1959)
- Groovin' with Golson (New Jazz, 1959)
- Winchester Special with Lem Winchester (New Jazz, 1959)
- Gettin' with It (New Jazz, 1960) – recorded in 1959
- Take a Number from 1 to 10 (Argo, 1961) – recorded in 1960-61
- Pop + Jazz = Swing (Audio Fidelity, 1962) – reconfigured and issued as Just Jazz! (1965)
- Turning Point (Mercury, 1962)
- Free (Argo, 1963) – recorded in 1962
- Stockholm Sojourn (Prestige, 1965) – recorded in 1964
- Tune In, Turn On (Verve, 1967)
- Are You Real (CBS/Sony, 1977)
- Killer Joe (Columbia, 1977)
- I'm Always Dancin' to the Music (Columbia, 1978)
- California Message with Curtis Fuller (Baystate, 1981) – recorded in 1980
- One More Mem'ry with Curtis Fuller (Baystate, 1982) – recorded in 1981
- Time Speaks with Freddie Hubbard and Woody Shaw (Baystate, 1983) – recorded in 1982
- This Is for You, John (Baystate, 1984) – recorded in 1983
- Stardust with Freddie Hubbard (Denon, 1987)
- Benny Golson Quartet Live (Dreyfus, 1991) – live recorded in 1989
- Benny Golson Quartet (LRC Ltd., 1990) – also released as Up, Jumped, Spring (2002)
- Domingo with Curtis Fuller (Dreyfus, 1992) – recorded in 1991
- I Remember Miles (Alfa Jazz, 1993) – recorded in 1992
- That's Funky with Nat Adderley (Meldac Jazz, 1995) – recorded in 1994
- Three Little Words (Jazz House Records 609, 1997) – recorded live at Ronnie Scott's Jazz Club in 1965
- Up Jumped Benny (Arkadia Jazz, 1997) – live recorded in 1996
- Tenor Legacy (Arkadia Jazz, 1998) – recorded in 1996
- Remembering Clifford (Milestone, 1998) – recorded in 1997
- One Day, Forever (Arkadia Jazz, 2001) – recorded in 1996-2000
- Terminal 1 (Concord, 2004)
- The Masquerade Is Over (Azzurra Music, 2005)
- The Many Moods of Benny Golson (Arkadia Jazz, 2007)
- New Time, New 'Tet (Concord, 2009) – recorded in 2008
- Horizon Ahead (HighNote, 2016) – recorded in 2015

== With the Jazztet ==
- Meet the Jazztet (Argo, 1960)
- Big City Sounds (Argo, 1960)
- The Jazztet and John Lewis (Argo, 1961) – recorded in 1960-61
- The Jazztet at Birdhouse (Argo, 1961) – live
- Here and Now (Mercury, 1962)
- Another Git Together (Mercury, 1962)
- Voices All (East West, 1983) – recorded in 1982
- Moment to Moment (Soul Note, 1983)
- V.A., Playboy Jazz Festival (Elektra/Musician, 1984)[2LP] – compilation live recorded in 1982
- Back to the City (Contemporary, 1986) – live
- Nostalgia (Baystate, 1988) – recorded in 1983
- Real Time (Contemporary, 1988) – live recorded in 1986

== As arranger ==
With Kenny Burrell

- Both Feet on the Ground (Fantasy, 1973)

With Jimmy Cleveland

- Rhythm Crazy (EmArcy, 1964) – recorded in 1959. also as a performer.

With Art Farmer

- Brass Shout (United Artists, 1959)
- Baroque Sketches (Columbia, 1967) – recorded in 1966

With Curtis Fuller

- Sliding Easy (United Artists, 1959)

With Red Holloway

- Sax, Strings & Soul (Prestige, 1964)

With Roland Kirk

- The Roland Kirk Quartet Meets the Benny Golson Orchestra (Mercury, 1963)

With Illinois Jacquet

- Bosses of the Ballad (Argo, 1964)

With Jack McDuff

- Prelude (Prestige, 1964) – recorded in 1963
- The Dynamic Jack McDuff (Prestige, 1964)
- Walk On By (Prestige, 1966)
- The Midnight Sun (Prestige, 1969) – recorded in 1964-66
- Steppin' Out (Prestige, 1969) – recorded in 1961-66

With Freda Payne

- How Do You Say I Don't Love You Anymore (MGM, 1966)

With Jerome Richardson

- Groove Merchant (Verve, 1968) – recorded in 1967

With Sahib Shihab

- Jazz Sahib (Savoy, 1957)

With Jimmy Witherspoon

- Some of My Best Friends Are the Blues (Prestige, 1964)

== As sideman ==
With Art Blakey

- 1958 - Paris Olympia (Fontana, 1958) – live
- Des Femmes Disparaissent (Fontana, 1958) – soundtrack
- Moanin' (Blue Note, 1959) – recorded in 1958

With Curtis Fuller

- The Curtis Fuller Jazztet (Savoy, 1959)
- Blues-ette (Savoy, 1960) – recorded in 1959
- Imagination (Savoy, 1960) – recorded in 1959
- Blues-ette Part II (Savoy, 1993)

With Dizzy Gillespie

- Dizzy in Greece (Verve, 1957) – recorded in 1956–57
- Birks' Works (Verve, 1957)
- Dizzy Gillespie at Newport (Verve, 1957)
- The Greatest Trumpet of Them All (Verve, 1957)
- Bird Songs: The Final Recordings (Telarc, 1992)
- To Bird with Love (Telarc, 1992)

With Quincy Jones

- The Birth of a Band! (Mercury, 1959)
- I/We Had a Ball (Limelight, 1965) – recorded in 1964-65

With John Lewis

- The Wonderful World of Jazz (Atlantic, 1961) – recorded in 1960
- Essence (Atlantic, 1965) – recorded in 1960-62

With others

- Ahmed Abdul-Malik, East Meets West (RCA Victor, 1960) – recorded in 1959
- Arkadia Jazz All Stars, Thank You, Duke! (Arkadia Jazz, 1999)
- Ron Carter, Stardust (Somethin' Else, 2001)
- Jimmy Cleveland, Cleveland Style (EmArcy, 1958) – recorded in 1957
- Cass Elliot, Cass Elliot (RCA, 1972) – recorded in 1971
- Art Farmer, Modern Art (United Artists, 1958)
- Ernie Henry, Last Chorus (Riverside, 1958) – recorded in 1956–57
- Milt Jackson, Bags' Opus (United Artists, 1959) – recorded in 1958
- Philly Joe Jones, Drums Around the World (Riverside, 1959)
- Abbey Lincoln, It's Magic (Riverside, 1958)
- Blue Mitchell, Out of the Blue (Riverside, 1959)
- Lee Morgan, Lee Morgan Vol. 3 (Blue Note, 1957)
- Oscar Pettiford, The Oscar Pettiford Orchestra in Hi-Fi Volume Two (ABC-Paramount, 1957) – also composer and arranger
- Sarah Vaughan, Sassy Swings Again (Mercury, 1967)
- Meeco, Beauty of the Night (Connector, 2012)[2CD] – recorded in 2011
- Gail Davies, Since I Don't Have You (Little Chickadee, 2014)
