= Carl Allen (drummer) =

American jazz drummer (born 1961)

Carl Allen (born April 25, 1961) is an American jazz drummer.

Allen attended William Paterson University.

He has worked with a wide variety of musicians, including Freddie Hubbard, Jackie McLean, George Coleman, Phil Woods, the Benny Green Trio, and Rickie Lee Jones.

It was with Green that Allen met bassist Christian McBride. The two have teamed up frequently, working for many combos of big name leaders. McBride recruited Allen for his band, Christian McBride & Inside Straight. Allen is that quintet's drummer for both its first recording, Kinda Brown, and its road tours.

In 1988, Allen and Vincent Herring founded Big Apple Productions, which produced several albums featuring young jazz performers.

He joined the faculty of The Juilliard School in 2001 and became the Artistic Director of Jazz Studies in 2008. He was replaced as director by Wynton Marsalis in 2013 and left Juilliard at the end of the academic year.

In 2011, Allen appeared as himself in two episodes of the HBO series Tremé in a studio recording scene in New York City.

In 2014, he formed his own group, The Art of Elvin, to pay tribute to drummers Art Blakey and Elvin Jones. The band debuted at the Percussive Arts Society (PAS) conference in Indianapolis, Indiana with Allen on drums, Freddie Hendrix (trumpet), Tivon Pennicott (tenor sax), Xavier Davis (piano), and Yasushi Nakamura (bass).

From 2021 to 2026, Allen served as the William D. and Mary Grant Endowed Professor of Jazz Studies at the University of Missouri - Kansas City (UMKC) Conservatory.

== Discography ==
=== As leader/co-leader ===
- The Pursuer (Atlantic, 1994)
- Testimonial (Atlantic, 1995)

As leader of The Manhattan Project

- Dreamboat (Alfa Jazz/Timeless, 1990) – rec. 1989
- Piccadilly Square (Alfa Jazz/Timeless)
- The Dark Side of Dewey (Alfa Jazz/Evidence, 1996)
- Echoes of Our Heroes (Alfa Jazz Japan, 1996)
- We Remember Cannonball (Alfa Jazz Japan, 1997)

Co-led with Rodney Whitaker

- Get Ready (Mack Avenue, 2007)
- Work to Do (Mack Avenue, 2009)

Other collaboration

- Live from the Detroit Jazz Festival 2013 (Mack Avenue, 2014)

=== As sideman ===
With Don Braden

- After Dark (Criss Cross, 1994)
- The Time Is Now (Criss Cross, 1994)
- Wish List (Criss Cross, 1994)

With Cyrus Chestnut

- The Nutman Speaks (Alfa Jazz )
- The Nutman Speaks Again (Alfa Jazz, 2003)
- Another Direction (Alfa Jazz )

With Art Farmer

- The Company I Keep (Arabesque, 1994)
- The Meaning of Art (Arabesque, 1995)
- Silk Road (Arabesque, 1997)

With Benny Golson

- Up Jumped Benny (Arkadia Jazz, 1997)
- One Day, Forever (Arkadia Jazz, 2001) – rec. 1999
- Terminal 1 (Concord, 2004)
- New Time, New 'Tet (Concord, 2009)
- Horizon Ahead (HighNote, 2016)

With the Benny Green Trio

- Blue Notes (Toshiba-EMI Japan)
- That's Right (Blue Note)
- Testifyin! (Blue Note)

With Vincent Herring

- Evidence (Landmark, 1991)
- Dawnbird (Landmark, 1993)
- Folklore: Live at the Village Vanguard (MusicMasters, 1994)

With Freddie Hubbard

- Life Flight (Blue Note)
- Topsy (Alfa Jazz )
- MMTC (MusicMasters )

With Jackie McLean

- Dynasty (Triloka)
- Rites of Passage (Triloka)
- The J-Mac Attack (Birdology/Verve )

With Woody Shaw

- Double Take (with Freddie Hubbard, Blue Note, 1985)
- The Eternal Triangle (with Freddie Hubbard, Blue Note, 1985)
- Imagination (Muse, 1987)

With Christian McBride

- People Music (Mack Avenue, 2013)
- Live at the Village Vanguard (Mack Avenue, 2021)

With others

- Arkadia Jazz All Stars, Thank You, Joe!
- Eric Alexander, Full Range (Criss Cross, 1994)
- Donald Brown, Sources of Inspiration (Muse, 1989)
- Donald Byrd, A City Called Heaven (Landmark, 1991)
- Dan Faulk, Focusing In (Criss Cross Jazz, 1992)
- Ricky Ford, Hot Brass (Muse, 1991)
- Donald Harrison and Terrence Blanchard, Crystal Stair (Columbia Records, 1987)
- Dewey Redman, African Venus (Evidence, 1992)
- Phil Woods, Alto Summit (Milestone, 1996)
- Eliane Elias, Everything I Love (Blue Note and EMI, 2000)
- George Freeman, The Good Life (HighNote 2023)
