= Up Jumped Benny =

Live album by Benny Golson
- Released: 1997
- Recorded: May 23, 1996
- Venue: Jazz Club Uster, Uster, Zurich, Switzerland
- Genre: Jazz
- Length: 71:26
- Label: Arkadia Jazz; 70741
- Producer: Makoto Kimata

Benny Golson chronology
Tenor Legacy (1996)	Up Jumped Benny (1997)	Remembering Clifford (1998)

Up Jumped Benny is a live album by saxophonist/composer Benny Golson that was recorded in 1996 and originally released by the Arkadia Jazz label.

== Reception ==
Professional ratings
Review scores
Source	Rating
AllMusic	3/5 stars
The Penguin Guide to Jazz Recordings	3/4 stars

The AllMusic review by Richard S. Ginell said "Benny Golson had not appeared on an American jazz label in a long time, so Bob Karcy of Arkadia Jazz stepped in where others feared to tread, issuing this live gig from a jazz club somewhere in Switzerland on the last day of a tour ... Stanley Crouch's liner notes are full of his usual respect-your-elders blather and the sound quality is boxy, but Golson's fans will feel fortunate to have this".

JazzTimes' Harvey Pekar observed "In addition to being among the great jazz composer-arrangers, Golson’s a superb tenor saxophonist ... The group takes a couple of tunes at a rapid clip but most are done at medium and slow tempos. On them Golson’s warm tone and inventiveness come to the fore. And he can still cook".

== Track listing ==
All compositions by Benny Golson except where noted

1. "Up Jumped Spring" (Freddie Hubbard) – 8:48
2. "Stablemates" – 8:46
3. Talk Intro – 0:23
4. "Tiny Capers" (Clifford Brown) – 10:45
5. Talk Intro – 0:24
6. "I Remember Clifford" – 15:21
7. "For Old Times Sake" (James Williams) – 6:32
8. "Whisper Not" – 10:02
9. "Gypsy Jingle Jangle" – 10:25

== Personnel ==
- Benny Golson – tenor saxophone
- Kevin Hays – piano
- Dwayne Burno - bass
- Carl Allen – drums

=== Production ===
- Michael Muller – producer
- Heiri Wolf – engineer
