= Big 6 (album) =

Studio album by Blue Mitchell
- Released: 1958
- Recorded: July 2 & 3, 1958
- Studio: Plaza Sound Studios
- Genre: Jazz
- Length: 42:56
- Label: Riverside
- Producer: Orrin Keepnews

Blue Mitchell chronology
Big 6 (1958)	Out of the Blue (1959)

Big 6 is the debut album by American trumpeter Blue Mitchell recorded in 1958 and released on the Riverside label. It contains the first recording of Benny Golson's jazz standard "Blues March".

== Reception ==
Professional ratings
Review scores
Source	Rating
Allmusic	5/5 stars
The Penguin Guide to Jazz Recordings	4/4 stars

The Allmusic review by Scott Yanow awarded the album 5 stars and stated "Mitchell is heard in excellent form in an all-star sextet".

== Track listing ==
No.	Title	Length
1.	"Blues March" (Benny Golson)	10:23
2.	"Big Six" (William Boone Jr.)	6:42
3.	"There Will Never Be Another You" (Mack Gordon, Harry Warren)	4:59
4.	"Brother 'Ball" (Blue Mitchell)	7:21
5.	"Jamph" (Curtis Fuller)	3:46
6.	"Sir John" (Mitchell)	8:05
7.	"Promenade" (Boone)	1:40

- Recorded in New York City on July 2 & 3, 1958.

== Personnel ==
- Blue Mitchell - trumpet
- Curtis Fuller - trombone
- Johnny Griffin - tenor saxophone
- Wynton Kelly - piano
- Wilbur Ware - bass
- Philly Joe Jones - drums
