= Bags' Opus =

Studio album by Milt Jackson
- Released: 1959
- Recorded: December 28–29, 1958
- Genre: Jazz
- Length: 34:18
- Label: United Artists
- Producer: Jack Lewis

Milt Jackson chronology
| Bean Bags (1959) | Bags' Opus (1959) | The Ballad Artistry of Milt Jackson (1959) |

Bags' Opus is an album by vibraphonist Milt Jackson featuring performances recorded in 1958 and released on the United Artists label.

== Reception ==
The AllMusic review by Scott Yanow awarded the album 4½ stars, calling it "A successful outing by some of the greats."

Professional ratings
Review scores
| Source | Rating |
|---|---|
| AllMusic | 4.5/5 stars |

== Track listing ==
All compositions by Milt Jackson except as indicated

1. "Ill Wind" (Harold Arlen, Ted Koehler) - 4:28
2. "Blues for Diahann" - 7:25
3. "Afternoon in Paris" (John Lewis) - 6:02
4. "I Remember Clifford" (Benny Golson) - 5:55
5. "Thinking of You" (Bert Kalmar, Harry Ruby) - 4:23
6. "Whisper Not" (Golson) - 6:16
  - Recorded at Nola's Penthouse Sound Studios in New York City on December 28 & 29, 1958

== Personnel ==
- Milt Jackson – vibes
- Art Farmer – trumpet
- Benny Golson – tenor saxophone
- Tommy Flanagan – piano
- Paul Chambers – bass
- Connie Kay – drums
