= I Remember Miles =

I Remember Miles refers to the following Miles Davis tribute albums

- I Remember Miles (Benny Golson album), released in 1993
- I Remember Miles (Shirley Horn album), released in 1998
