= California Message =

Studio album by Benny Golson featuring Curtis Fuller
- Released: 1981
- Recorded: October 20, 21 & 22, 1980
- Studio: Maui Music Studios, Los Angeles, CA
- Genre: Jazz
- Length: 46:43
- Label: Baystate; RJL 8013
- Producer: Fumimaru Kawashima, Makoto Kimata

Benny Golson chronology
| I'm Always Dancin' to the Music (1978) | California Message (1981) | One More Mem'ry (1982) |

Curtis Fuller chronology
| Giant Bones at Nice (1980) | California Message (1981) | One More Mem'ry (1982) |

California Message is an album by saxophonist/composer Benny Golson that was recorded in 1980 and released on the Japanese Baystate label the following year. The album features trombonist Curtis Fuller, Golsons colleague from The Jazztet who also played with The Jazz Messengers, and was reissued on the Dutch Timeless label in 1984.

== Reception ==
Professional ratings
Review scores
| Source | Rating |
|---|---|
| AllMusic | 3/5 stars |

The AllMusic review by Steve Loewy said "While not one of Benny Golson's best recordings, there are still delights to be found. Golson leads a septet of trombonist Curtis Fuller plus mostly studio musicians from the Los Angeles area, performing a set of generally well-known tunes written by the leader ... trumpeter Oscar Brashear is a pleasant surprise with his lyrical, forward-looking solos. Golson is a pleasure to hear, too, on both tenor and soprano saxophones. Largely, the recording is fairly ordinary, though, with a sense that much of this has been done before, only better, by groups led by Golson. There is better Golson available elsewhere".

== Track listing ==
All compositions by Benny Golson

1. "California Message" – 5:41
2. "Soul Talk" – 6:41
3. "Blues March" – 5:56
4. "The Berliner" – 5:48
5. "Whisper Not" – 8:55
6. "Free Again" – 7:15
7. "I Remember Clifford" – 6:30

== Personnel ==
- Benny Golson – tenor saxophone, soprano saxophone
- Curtis Fuller – trombone
- Oscar Brashear – trumpet
- Thurman Green – trombone
- Bill Mays – piano
- Bob Magnusson - bass
- Roy McCurdy – drums

=== Production ===
- Fumimaru Kawashima, Makoto Kimata – producer
- Ron Nadel – engineer
