= That's Funky =

Studio album by Benny Golson Funky Quintet
- Released: 1995
- Recorded: December 22–23, 1994
- Studio: 39th Street Music, NY
- Genre: Jazz
- Length: 49:01
- Label: Meldac Jazz; MECJ-30001
- Producer: Makoto Kimata

Benny Golson chronology
I Remember Miles (1993)	That's Funky (1995)	Tenor Legacy (1996)

Arkadia Jazz cover

That's Funky is an album by saxophonist/composer Benny Golson that was recorded in 1994 and originally released by the Japanese Meldac Jazz label before being reissued by Arkadia Jazz in 2001.

== Reception ==
Professional ratings
Review scores
Source	Rating
AllMusic	4/5 stars
The Penguin Guide to Jazz Recordings	3.5/4 stars

The AllMusic review by Michael G. Nastos said "As an originator of the initial soul-funk movement of the '60s when he was with Art Blakey's Jazz Messengers, Golson is eminently qualified to funkify jazz and R&B-flavored instrumental music. Nat Adderley plays cornet alongside Golson's tenor in this, one of his last recordings before he passed away ... Though they're not swinging, for the most part, in conventional 2/4 or 4/4 jazz beats, in a sense they are swinging in their own inimitable, danceable, street-derived, backbeat-driven way á la Silver, Stanley Turrentine, and Grant Green, among others. Those inventors of this boogaloo-influenced subgenre should be happy with Golson's results".

All About Jazz's C. Michael Bailey stated "All of the performances are splendidly executed, solos well considered, and performance spontaneously conceived ... What could possibly be better? In two words: the originals. That is not to slight the performances here, they are very fine. I would encourage all who read this to buy this disc and once curious, invest in the original recordings of these tunes. You cannot go wrong.There is no mixed bag here; this is an excellent disc. It will be a fine addition to any fan of jazz. But the originals are brilliant artifacts that while old are still essential to the proper understanding of this great American music".

JazzTimes' John Murph observed "With this aptly described quintet, tenor saxophonist Benny Golson pays tribute to the stylistic idiom that made him famous-hard bop. By channeling his R&B sensibilities, which go back to his 1950s days with Bull Moose, Golson interprets a handful of war horses ... While some may argue that the material on That’s Funky is overdue for a moratorium, Golson’s Funky Quintet has ingeniously crafted worthy interpretations that sound fresh without sentimentality or overt pretensions".

== Track listing ==
All compositions by Benny Golson except where noted

1. "Mack the Knife (Funky Version)" (Kurt Weill, Bertolt Brecht) – 5:38
2. "Moanin'" (Bobby Timmons) – 7:57
3. "Sidewinder" (Lee Morgan) – 6:11
4. "Mississippi Windows" – 8:16
5. "Work Song" (Nat Adderley) – 6:21
6. "Moritat (Modern Bebop Version)" (Weill, Brecht) – 6:01
7. "Blues March – 8:37

== Personnel ==
- Benny Golson – tenor saxophone, arranger
- Nat Adderley – trumpet
- Monty Alexander – piano
- Ray Drummond – bass
- Marvin "Smitty" Smith – drums

=== Production ===
- Makoto Kimata – producer
- Dennis Wall – engineer
