= Bill Mays =

American jazz pianist (born 1944)

- Born: William Allen Mays; February 5, 1944 (age 82); Sacramento, California, U.S.
- Genres: Jazz
- Occupation: Musician
- Instrument: Piano
- Years active: 1960s–present
- Labels: Concord Jazz, DMP, Palmetto
- Website: billmays.net

William Allen Mays (born February 5, 1944), known professionally as Bill Mays, is an American jazz pianist from Sacramento, California.

== Biography ==
Mays came from a musical family and at the age of 15 became interested in jazz at an Earl Hines concert.

From 1969 to the early 1980s Mays worked as a studio session musician in Los Angeles. He has been an accompanist to singers Al Jarreau, Peggy Lee, Anita O'Day, Frank Sinatra, Sarah Vaughan and Dionne Warwick, and also worked with artists such as Don Ellis, Mel Lewis, Barry Manilow, Shelly Manne, Bob Mintzer, Red Mitchell, Gerry Mulligan, Art Pepper, Bud Shank, Bobby Shew, Sonny Stitt, Paul Winter, Phil Woods, Ray Drummond and Frank Zappa. In 1984, he moved to New York City and began to do more work as a bandleader, composer, and arranger. He has recorded 43 albums under his own name, and has been heard on hundreds more by others. He has published a book Stories of the Road, the Studios, Sidemen & Singers: 55 Years In The Music Biz.

== Discography ==
=== As leader ===
- A Musical Cocktail: The Music of Cole Porter (MCR, 1976)
- Two of a Mind with Red Mitchell (ITI, 1983)
- Tha's Delights with Shelly Manne, Andy Simpkins, Ralph Moore, Tom Harrell (Trend, 1983)
- One to One with Ray Drummond (DMP, 1990)
- One to One 2 with Ray Drummond (DMP, 1991)
- Kaleidoscope with Peter Sprague, Dick Oatts, Harvie Swartz, Jeff Hirshfield (The Jazz Alliance, 1992)
- Live At Maybeck - Concord Duo Series Volume Seven with Ed Bickert (Concord Jazz, 1994)
- Live At Maybeck (Concord Jazz, 1995)
- An Ellington Affair with Lewis Nash, John Goldsby(Concord Jazz, 1995)
- Mays in Manhattan with Marvin Stamm, Ed Neumeister, Jon Gordon, Sean Smith, Tim Horner (Concord Jazz, 1996)
- Out in Pa. with Matt Wilson, Martin Wind (No Blooze Music, 1999)
- By Ourselves with Marvin Stamm (Marstam, 2000)
- Summer Sketches (Palmetto, 2001)
- Going Home (Palmetto, 2003)
- Bick's Bag with Neil Swainson, Terry Clarke (Triplet, 2004)
- Live at Jazz Standard (Palmetto, 2005)
- Beyond the Red Door with Bud Shank (Jazzed Media, 2007)
- Stuffy Turkey with Joe La Barbera, Mattias Svensson (Five Stars Records, 2009)
- Blue Rondo a la Turk with Keisuke Ohta (Five Stars Records, 2009)
- The Best Is Yet To Come with Joe La Barbera, Rwu Kawamura (Five Stars Records, 2010)
- Mays at the Movies with Peter Washington, Billy Drummond (SteepleChase, 2010)
- Phil & Bill with Phil Woods (Palmetto, 2011)
- Front Row Seat Solo (©Bill Mays, 2015)
- Live at COTA (No Blooze Music, 2019)
- Mays Plays Mays (No Blooze Music, 2019)
- Autumn Serenade (Sunnyside Records, 2022)
- Bill Mays Sings (No Blooze Music, 2024)
- Soundscape (No Blooze Music, 2025)

With Inventions Trio

- Fantasy (Palmetto, 2007)
- Delaware River Suite (No Blooze Music, 2008)
- Life's a Movie (Chiaroscuro, 2013)

With Road Work Ahead

- Night And Day (Trend, 1983)
- On The Road Again (SBE, 1998)
- Intersection (SBE, 2012)

=== As sideman ===
With Carter Burwell

- Gods and Monsters (RCA Victor/BMG, 1998)
- The Man Who Wasn't There (Decca, 2001)
- The Alamo (Hollywood, 2004)
- Hail Caesar! (Back Lot/Universal 2016)

With Elliot Goldenthal

- Cobb (Sony Classical, 1994)
- Interview with the Vampire (Geffen, 1994)
- Sphere (Varese Sarabande, 1998)

With Benny Golson

- California Message (Baystate, 1981)
- One More Mem'ry (Baystate, 1982)
- One Day, Forever (Arkadia, 2001)

With Bob Magnusson

- Revelation (Discovery, 1979)
- Two Generations of Music (Trend, 1982)

With Barry Manilow

- Even Now (Arista, 1978)
- One Voice (Arista, 1979)
- Barry (Arista, 1980)
- If I Should Love Again (Arista, 1981)
- I Wanna Do It with You (Arista, 1982)
- 2:00 AM Paradise Cafe (Arista, 1984)

With Bud Shank

- Heritage (Concord Jazz, 1978)
- Crystal Comments with Bud Shank and Alan Broadbent (Concord Jazz, 1980)
- Explorations: 1980 with Bud Shank (Concord Concerto, 1980)
- Silver Storm (Raw, 2000)
- On the Trail (Raw, 2002)
- Fascinating Rhythms (Jazzed Media, 2009)

With Bobby Shew

- Class Reunion (Sutra, 1980)
- Outstanding in His Field (Inner City, 1980)
- Play Song (Jazz Hounds, 1981)
- Telepathy with Bobby Shew (Jazz Hounds, 1982)
- Shewhorn (Pausa, 1986)

With Frank Zappa

- Bognor Regis (Dragonfly, 2006)
- One Shot Deal (Zappa, 2008)
- Orchestral Favorites 40th Anniversary (Zappa, 2019)

With others

- Sarah Vaughan, A Time in My Life (Mainstream, 1971)
- Sarah Vaughan, Live At 1971 Monterey Jazz Festival (Monterey Jazz Festival Records, 2007)
- Percy Faith, Corazon (CBS, 1973)
- Ray Conniff, You’re The Sunshine Of My Life (Columbia, 1973)
- Percy Faith, New Thing (Columbia, 1974)
- Percy Faith, The Entertainer (Columbia, 1974)
- Andy Williams, Christmas Present (Columbia, 1974)
- Jose Feliciano, Just Wanna Rock 'n' Roll (RCA Victor, 1975)
- Bobby King, The Outer Kingdom (Del Fi DOCD, 1975)
- Marlena Shaw, Who Is This Bitch, Anyway? (Blue Note, 1975)
- Maxine Weldon, Alone On My Own (Monument, 1975)
- Ray Conniff, Love Will Keep Us Together (Columbia, 1975)
- Charles Bernstein, Gator (United Artists, 1976)
- Kathie Epstein, The Quiet Riot (Petra, 1976)
- Jaye P. Morgan, Jaye P. Morgan (Candor, 1976)
- Andy Williams, Andy (Columbia, 1976)
- Sharalee Lucas, Jesus, You Are My Friend (Petra Records, 1976)
- Barry Devorzon, Nadia's Theme (Arista, 1976)
- Donny & Marie Osmond, New Season (Polydor, 1976)
- Paul Johnson Singers, Sons Of The Kingdom (Petra, 1976)
- Joe Harnell, Harnell (Capitol, 1977)
- Leonard Cohen, Death of a Ladies' Man (Columbia, 1977)
- Lalo Schifrin, Rollercoaster (MCA, 1977)
- Morris Albert, Love And Life (RCA, 1977)
- Kathie Lee Johnson, Finders Keepers (Petra, 1978)
- Larry Gatlin, Oh! Brother (Monument, 1978)
- Dick St. Nicklaus, Magic (Epic, 1979)
- The Manhattan Transfer, Extensions (Atlantic, 1979)
- Dionne Warwick, Dionne (Arista, 1979)
- Peter Sprague, The Path (Xanadu, 1980)
- Bill Tole Orchestra, New York, New York (Calliope, 1980)
- Movie Soundtrack LP, Sharkey's Machine (Warner Brothers, 1981)
- Gordon Brisker, Collective Consciousness (Sutra, 1981)
- Mark Murphy, Bop for Kerouac (Muse, 1981)
- Howard Roberts, Turning to Spring (Discovery, 1981)
- Shelly Manne, Double Piano Jazz Quartet in Concert at Carmelo's (Trend, 1981)
- Shelly Manne, Double Piano Jazz Quartet in Concert at Carmelo's Vol. 2 (Trend, 1982)
- Freddie Hubbard, Ride Like the Wind (Elektra Musician, 1982)
- Beau Williams, Beau Williams (Capitol, 1982)
- Billy Preston, Pressin' On (Motown, 1982)
- Scot Scheer, Rappin' It Up (Palo Alto, 1982)
- Peter Sprague, Bird Raga (Xanadu, 1983)
- Wilton Felder, Gentle Fire (MCA, 1983)
- Lew Tabackin, My Old Flame (Atlas, 1983)
- Ron McCroby, Ron McCroby Plays Puccolo (Concord Jazz, 1983)
- Ron McCroby, The Other Whistler (Concord Jazz, 1984)
- Michael Vlatkovich, 9113 Michael Vlatkovich (Thank You Records, 1984)
- Morgana King, Simply Eloquent (Muse, 1986)
- Gerry Mulligan, Symphonic Dreams (PAR, 1987)
- Mark Murphy, Beauty And The Beast (Muse, 1987)
- Mark Murphy, Kerouac, Then and Now (Muse, 1989)
- Dianne Mower, A Song For You (Jazz City, 1990)
- Mark Murphy, One for Junior (Muse, 1991)
- Jeff Jarvis, Golden Palm (Optimism, 1991)
- Jerry Tilitz, Tales Of Two Cities (Bellaphon, 1991)
- Angelo Badalamenti, Twin Peaks Fire Walk with Me (Warner Bros., 1992)
- Carolyn Leonhart, Vol. 1 & 2 Carolyn Leonhart (Toshiba-EMI, 1992)
- Kenny Garrett (& others), Super Septet (Sweet Basil, 1992)
- Sherrie Maricle, Live Concert (LRC, 1993)
- Jill O'Hara, Jill O'Hara (Sterling, 1993)
- Allen Mezquida, A Good Thing (Koch Jazz, 1993)
- Martin Wind, Gone With The Wind (September Records, 1993)
- Gerry Mulligan, Dream a Little Dream (Telarc, 1994)
- John Goldsby, Tale Of The Fingers (Concord Jazz, 1994)
- Bob Kindred, Hidden Treasures (Music for the World Foundation, 1994)
- Dave Bargeron (et al), Super Trombone 96 (Sweet Basil, 1995)
- Martin Wind, Tender Waves (“A” Records, aka Challenge Records, 1995)
- Bob Kindred, Bending Towards The Light (Conawago Records, 1995)
- Bruce Eskovitz, One For Newk (Koch Jazz, 1995)
- Trudy Desmond, My One And Only (Justin Time Records, 1998)
- Catherine Dupuis, I Hear Music (JBQ, 1999)
- Wayne Darling & Arni Egilsson, Say What? (SOS Music, 1999)
- Charles Cochran, Charles Cochran Meets Bill Mays (Audiophile, 2000)
- Mary Foster Conklin, You’d Be Paradise (Mock Turtle Music, 2001)
- Bruce Eskovitz, Conversations (Azica, 2001)
- Catherine Dupuis, Moments (Bearheart, 2001)
- Dina Blade, S’wonderful (Pony Boy, 2001)
- Dina Blade, I’m In The Mood For Love (Nocturne Records, 2002)
- Peter Weniger & Martin Wind, The Soccerball (Nagel Heyer, 2002)
- David Arnold, Changing Lanes (Varese Sarabande, 2002)
- Marvin Stamm & Ed Soph, Live at Birdland NYC (Jazzed Media, 2005)
- Jed Levy, Mood Ellington (SteepleChase, 2006)
- Jack Walrath, Ballroom (SteepleChase, 2008)
- Kelly Harland, Long Ago And Far Away (Origin Records, 2008)
- Yoshiaki Masuo, I'm Glad There Is You (Sunshine, 2009)
- Ann Hampton Callaway, At Last (Telarc, 2009)
- Mattias Svensson, Head Up High (Five Stars Records, 2009)
- Kazuhimo Tsumura, Ole (Five Stars Records, 2009)
- Jed Levy, One Night At Kitano (Steeplchase, 2009)
- Jack Cortner, Sound Check (JazzedMedia, 2009)
- Chuck Deardorf, Transparence (Origin Records, 2011)
- Adam Unsworth, Balance (Acoustical Concepts Records, 2014)
- Phil Woods, Live at the Deer Head Inn (Deer Head, 2015)
- Lynn Seaton, Live (self-released, 2016)
- John Cacavas, Lalo Schifrin, Airport '77/The Concorde... Airport '79 (La-La Land, 2018)
- Dave Grusin, And Justice for All (Varese Sarabande, 2018)
- Art Pepper & Warne Marsh, Unreleased Art Volume 9 at Donte's, April 26, 1974 (Widow's Taste, 2016)
- P.J. Perry, This Quiet Room (Cellar Music, 2018)
- James Kreger, Have Yourself a Merry Cello Christmas (Guild, 2018)
- Philippe Sarde, Ghost Story (Quartet, 2019)
- Tommy Cecil, Side By Side-Sondheim (©Tommy Cecil, 2012)
- Tommy Cecil, Our Time-Sondheim Duos 2 (©Tommy Cecil, 2013)
- Todd Strait, There'll Be Some Changes Made (self-release, 2018)
- Martin Wind, My Astorian Queen (Laika Records, 2021)
- David Larsen, The Mulligan Chronicles (self-released, 2021)
- Todd Strait, Fun House (self-release, 2024)
- Mattias Svensson, Embrace (Origin Records, 2026)
- Ron Vincent, Ray's Hat Trick (Origin Records, 2026)
