= Bob Magnusson =

American jazz bassist (born 1947)

Bob Magnusson (born February 24, 1947, in New York) is an American jazz bassist.

== Career ==
Magnusson studied French horn for 12 years before switching to bass in 1967. He toured with Buddy Rich's Orchestra in 1968 and played with the San Diego Symphony and Sarah Vaughan (1971–72 and 1975–76). A studio musician for decades, he was part of the co-op group Road Work Ahead from 1979 to 1982, and worked with John Klemmer, Art Pepper, Benny Golson, Joe Farrell, Linda Ronstadt (with Nelson Riddle's Orchestra), Bud Shank, Laurindo Almeida, Shorty Rogers, Bob Cooper, Lou Donaldson, Clifford Jordan, George Cables, Victor Lewis, Joe Pass, Art Farmer, Kenny Barron, Freddie Hubbard, Slide Hampton, Billy Higgins, Carl Fontana, Tommy Flanagan, Mike Wofford, Holly Hofmann, Kenny Burrell, Roger Kellaway, Randy Porter, Ernie Watts, Eddie "Cleanhead" Vinson, Peter Erskine, Bobby Shew, Bill Mays, Natalie Cole, Neil Diamond, Bonnie Raitt, 10,000 Maniacs, Madonna, Hank Jones, Cedar Walton, Jimmy Heath, Peter Sprague and others. Including the Road Work Ahead projects, Magnusson led record dates for Discovery Records in 1979, 1980 and 1984, and Trend Records in 1982.

Magnusson has performed in many of the world's finest concert halls and club venues, such as Carnegie Hall, Lincoln Center, and Kennedy Center for the Performing Arts. He has made many trips to Europe, Japan, Australia, New Zealand, and Central and South America.

As a teacher and clinician, Magnusson was an active faculty member of Musician's Institute in Hollywood, California, from 1977 to 1996. In 1998 he joined the faculty at San Diego Mesa Community College and the Coronado School of the Arts, where he teaches harmony, theory and jazz improvisation. He wrote a book, The Art of the Walking Bass, which was published by the Hal Leonard Publishing Company in 1999.

== Discography ==
=== As leader ===
- Revelation (Discovery, 1979)
- Road Work Ahead (Discovery, 1981)
- Two Generations of Music (Trend, 1982)
- Song for Janet Lee (Discovery, 1985)
- Street News (CAP, 1997)
- Omens (CIMP, 2000)
- Liquid Lines (SBE, 2006)

=== As sideman ===
With Neil Diamond

- Lovescape (Columbia Records, 1991)
- The Christmas Album (Columbia Records, 1992)
- The Christmas Album, Volume II (Columbia Records, 1994)

With Bonnie Raitt

- The Glow (Warner Bros. Records, 1979)

With Rod Stewart

- It Had to Be You: The Great American Songbook (J Records, 2002)

With others

- 10,000 Maniacs, In My Tribe (Elektra 1987)
- Pepper Adams, California Cookin' (Interplay, 1983)
- Laurindo Almeida, Chamber Jazz (Concord Jazz 1993)
- Herb Alpert, Rise (A&M, 1979)
- Stanley Clarke & Bill Shields, Shieldstone (Bellaphon, 1987)
- Richie Cole, Holywood Madness (Muse, 1980)
- Richie Cole, Return to Alto Acres (Palo Alto, 1983)
- Chick Corea, Touchstone (Warner Bros., 1982)
- Joe Farrell, Skate Board Park (Xanadu, 1979)
- Mike Garson, Conversations with My Family (Resonance 2008)
- Benny Golson, California Message (Baystate, 1981)
- Benny Golson, One More Mem'ry (Baystate, 1982)
- Christian Howes, Heartfelt (Resonance, 2008)
- John Klemmer, Nexus (Arista Novus, 1979)
- John Klemmer, Finesse (Elektra, 1983)
- Andy LaVerne, Captain Video (Atlas, 1981)
- Madonna, I'm Breathless (Sire, 1990)
- Sam Most, Flute Talk (1979)
- Mark Murphy, Bop for Kerouac (Muse, 1981)
- Mark Murphy, Mark Murphy Sings Nat's Choice The Complete Nat "King" Cole Songbook Volumes 1 and 2 (Muse, 1986)
- Art Pepper, Among Friends (Interplay, 1978)
- Shorty Rogers & Bud Shank, Yesterday, Today and Forever (Concord Jazz, 1983)
- Linda Ronstadt, Lush Life (Asylum, 1984)
- Linda Ronstadt, For Sentimental Reasons (Elektra/Asylum, 1986)
- Linda Ronstadt, Round Midnight (Elektra, 1986)
- Steve Tyrell, A New Standard (Atlantic, 1999)
- Steve Tyrell, This Guy's in Love (Columbia, 2003)
