= Mike LeDonne =

American jazz pianist and organist

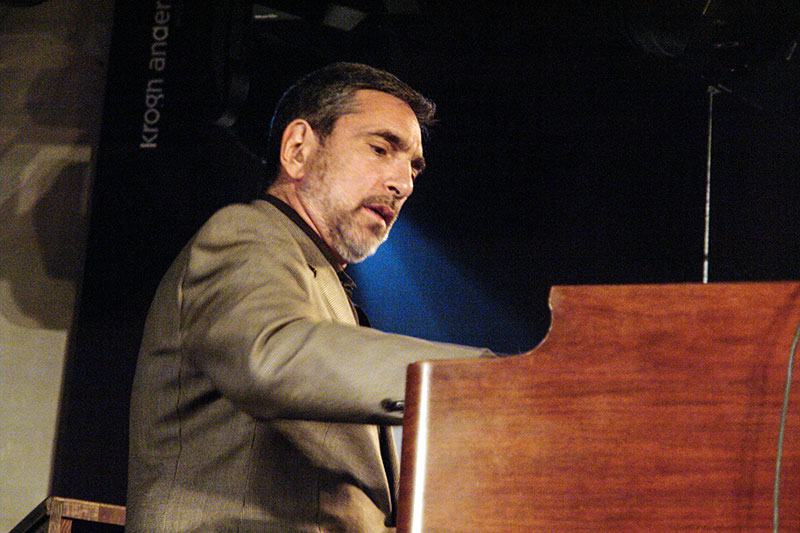
- LeDonne in Denmark, 2012

Background information
- Born: Michael Arthur LeDonne; October 26, 1956 (age 69); Bridgeport, Connecticut, U.S.
- Genre: Jazz
- Instruments: Piano; Hammond organ
- Years active: 1988–present
- Labels: Criss Cross; Savant; Double-Time

Michael Arthur LeDonne (born October 26, 1956) is an American jazz pianist, organist, composer, and educator. Having played with Benny Goodman, Milt Jackson, and Benny Golson in various stages of his career, he now leads several of his own groups and frequently performs around the world.

== Early life ==
LeDonne was born in Bridgeport, Connecticut, on October 26, 1956. His parents ran a music store. His father was a jazz guitarist, and LeDonne started performing locally around the age of ten. He also had lessons with John Mehegan for four years. After graduating from the New England Conservatory of Music where he studied with Jaki Byard in 1978, he moved to New York City and joined the Widespread Depression Jazz Orchestra.

== Later life and career ==
LeDonne left the Widespread Depression Jazz Orchestra in 1981 and toured the UK with Panama Francis and the Savoy Sultans Back in New York, LeDonne became the house pianist at Jimmy Ryan's, where he played with some big names in jazz during 1981–83. He was also part of Benny Goodman's Sextet in 1982–83.

LeDonne joined Milt Jackson's Quartet around 1987; he also composed for and recorded with the band and eventually became musical director. He stayed with this quartet until Jackson's death in 1999. His first recording as a leader was in 1988. It was released by Criss Cross, and LeDonne went on to record several more albums for this label in the 1990s. "As a sideman he played in the Art Farmer–Clifford Jordan Quintet and toured Paris with Grady Tate (both 1988), performed with Charles McPherson (1992), James Moody (1992), Sonny Rollins (1995), and Benny Golson (late 1990s to the present), and served as an accompanist to Ernestine Anderson, Annie Ross and Mary Stallings." In 1998, LeDonne began recording for Double-Time Records. In 2000, LeDonne started his "Groover Quartet" (organ with guitar, drums and, tenor saxophone) band as the result of a weekly Tuesday night gig at the Smoke Jazz Club in New York City. This brought his organ playing to prominence and the band went on to record many CDs for the Savant label as well as tour the world. He continues to split his time between the organ and the piano, releasing several number one 'jazz chart' recordings as well as winning the Downbeat Rising Star Poll and being nominated for Best Keyboards by the Jazz Journalist Association in 2012. As a sideman, he played organ with Lou Donaldson, George Coleman and David "Fathead" Newman.

A devoted supporter of promoting the inclusion, awareness, and visibility of people with disabilities, LeDonne organized the inaugural Disability Pride march in New York City in 2015.

== Playing style ==
Grove wrote: "A level of understatement in LeDonne's style reflects the playing of Hank Jones and Tommy Flanagan. Predominantly a bop pianist, he introduces a strong left hand into his work and reveals an understanding of swing piano playing".

== Discography ==
=== As leader/co-leader ===
| Year recorded | Title | Label | Notes |
|---|---|---|---|
| 1988 | 'Bout Time | Criss Cross | Quintet, with Tom Harrell (trumpet, flugelhorn), Gary Smulyan (baritone sax), Dennis Irwin (bass), Kenny Washington (drums) |
| 1990 | The Feeling of Jazz | Criss Cross | Quintet, with Tom Harrell (trumpet, flugelhorn), Gary Smulyan (baritone sax), Dennis Irwin (bass), Kenny Washington (drums) |
| 1990 | Common Ground | Criss Cross | Trio, with Dennis Irwin (bass), Kenny Washington (drums) |
| 1993 | Soulmates | Criss Cross | Sextet, with Ryan Kisor (trumpet), Joshua Redman (tenor sax), Jon Gordon (alto sax), Peter Washington (bass), Lewis Nash (drums) |
| 1995 | Waltz for an Urbanite | Criss Cross | Quintet, with Steve Nelson (vibraphone), Peter Bernstein (guitar), Peter Washington (bass), Kenny Washington (drums) |
| 1998 | To Each His Own | Double-Time | Trio, with Peter Washington (bass), Mickey Roker (drums) |
| 1998 | Then & Now | Double-Time | Quintet, with Jim Rotondi (trumpet), Eric Alexander (tenor sax), Peter Washington (bass), Joe Farnsworth (drums); released 2000 |
| 2001 | Bags Groove: A Tribute to Milt Jackson | Double-Time | Octet, with Jim Rotondi (trumpet), Steve Davis (trombone), Steve Wilson (alto sax, soprano sax), Jim Snidero (alto sax, flute), Steve Nelson, vibes), Bob Cranshaw (bass), Mickey Roker (drums) |
| 2003 | Smokin' Out Loud | Savant | Quartet, with Eric Alexander (tenor sax), Peter Bernstein (guitar), Joe Farnsworth (drums) |
| 2004 | You'll See! (Live at the Cellar) | Cellar Live | Quartet, with Eric Alexander (tenor sax), Peter Bernstein (guitar), Joe Farnsworth (drums) |
| 2005 | Night Song | Savant | Trio, with Ron Carter (bass), Joe Farnsworth (drums) |
| 2006 | On Fire (Live at Smoke) | Savant | Quartet, with Eric Alexander (tenor sax), Peter Bernstein (guitar), Joe Farnsworth (drums) |
| 2007 | Five Live (Live at Smoke) | Savant | Quintet, with Jeremy Pelt (trumpet), Eric Alexander (tenor sax), John Webber (bass), Joe Farnsworth (drums) |
| 2008 | Let It Go | GoFour | Blue Duo, with John Webber; released 2013 |
| 2009 | The Groover | Savant | Quartet, with Eric Alexander (tenor sax), Peter Bernstein (guitar), Joe Farnsworth (drums) |
| 2011 | Keep the Faith | Savant | LeDonne's Groover Quartet, with Eric Alexander (tenor sax), Peter Bernstein (guitar), Joe Farnsworth (drums) |
| 2012 | Speak (Live at the Cellar) | Cellar Live | Trio, with John Webber (bass), Joe Farnsworth (drums) |
| 2013 | I Love Music | Savant | LeDonne's Groover Quartet, with Eric Alexander (tenor sax), Peter Bernstein (guitar), Joe Farnsworth (drums) |
| 2015 | Awwl Right! | Savant | LeDonne's Groover Quartet, with Eric Alexander (tenor sax), Peter Bernstein (guitar), Joe Farnsworth (drums); 3 tracks with guest: Jeremy Pelt (trumpet) added, 2 tracks with guest: Bob Cranshaw (bass) added |
| 2016 | That Feelin' | Savant | LeDonne's Groover Quartet, with Eric Alexander (tenor sax), Peter Bernstein (guitar), Joe Farnsworth (drums); 3 tracks with guest: Vincent Herring (alto sax) added |
| 2018 | From the Heart | Savant | LeDonne's Groover Quartet, with Eric Alexander (tenor sax), Peter Bernstein (guitar), Joe Farnsworth (drums); 2 tracks with guest: Mike Clark (drums) added |
| 2019 | Partners in Time | Savant | Trio, with Christian McBride (bass), Lewis Nash (drums) |
| 2020 | It's All Your Fault | Savant | LeDonne's Groover Quartet (3 tracks), with a 17-piece big band added (5 tracks) |
| 2022 | The Heavy Hitters | Cellar Music Group | Sextet, with Eric Alexander (tenor sax), Jeremy Pelt (trumpet), Vincent Herring (alto sax), Peter Washington (bass), Kenny Washington (drums) |
| 2023 | Wonderful! | Cellar Music Group | LeDonne's Groover Quartet; with guest: Vincent Herring (alto sax), plus a gospel choir |
| 2023 | Together | Cellar Music Group | Duo, with Eric Alexander (tenor sax) |
| 2023 | That's What's Up! | Cellar Music Group | 'The Heavy Hitters' sextet, with Eric Alexander (tenor sax), Jeremy Pelt (trumpet), Vincent Herring (alto sax), Alexander Claffy (bass), Kenny Washington (drums) |
| 2024; 2004 | Turn It Up! (Live at the Sidedoor) | Cellar Music Group | LeDonne's Groover Quartet, with Eric Alexander (tenor sax), Peter Bernstein (guitar), Joe Farnsworth (drums); note: this is a 2-CD set... second disc is a reissue of You'll See! (Live at the Cellar) from 2004. |

=== As sideman ===
With Eric Alexander

- Gentle Ballads (2004) Venus
- The Battle (Live at Smoke) [with Vincent Herring] (2005) HighNote
- Gentle Ballads II (2006) Venus
- Gentle Ballads III (2007) Venus
- Lazy Afternoon: Gentle Ballads IV (2008) Venus
- Revival of the Fittest (2009) HighNote
- Friendly Fire (Live at Smoke) [with Vincent Herring] (2011) HighNote
- Live Encounter [New York All-Stars] (2018) Ubuntu Music

With Vincent Herring

- Night and Day (2015) Smoke Sessions

With Paul Brusger

- Waiting for the Next Trane (2014) SteepleChase

With Mike DiRubbo

- Keep Steppin' (2001) Criss Cross

With Chris Flory

- For All We Know (1988) Concord
- Word on the Street (1996) Double-Time
- For You (2007) Arbors

With Benny Golson

- Remembering Clifford (1998) Milestone
- Brown Immortal (1997 [rel. 2000]) Keystone/Video Arts [Japan]
- Terminal 1 (2004) Concord
- New Time, New 'Tet (2009) Concord
- Horizon Ahead (2016) HighNote

With Wycliffe Gordon

- Boss Bones (2007) Criss Cross
- Cone and T-Staff (2009) Criss Cross

With Scott Hamilton

- Organic Duke (1994) Concord

With Michael Hashim

- A Blue Streak (1991) Stash
- Guys and Dolls (1992) Stash
- Multi Coloured Blue [a tribute to Billy Strayhorn] (1998) Hep

With Milt Jackson

- Sa Va Bella (For Lady Legends) (1997) Qwest/WB

With Clifford Jordan

- The Mellow Side of Clifford Jordan (1989–1991 [rel. 1997]) Mapleshade

With Hendrik Meurkens

- Cobb's Pocket [with Peter Bernstein, Jimmy Cobb] (2019) In+Out

With Alvin Queen

- I Ain't Lookin' at You (2005) Enja
- Mighty Long Way (2008) Enja

With Duke Robillard

- Swing (1986 [rel. 1988]) Rounder

With Scott Robinson

- Jazz Ambassador: Scott Robinson Plays the Compositions of Louis Armstrong (2004) Arbors
- Forever Lasting: Scott Robinson Plays the Compositions of Thad Jones (2007) Arbors

With Jim Rotondi

- Blues for Brother Ray [a tribute to Ray Charles] (2009) Posi-Tone

With Tad Shull

- Deep Passion (1990) Criss Cross
- In the Land of the Tenor (1991) Criss Cross

With Greg Skaff

- Blues For Mr. T (2003) Khaeon [note: reissued in 2004 as Ellington Boulevard on Zoho]

With Gary Smulyan

- Saxophone Mosaic (1993) Criss Cross
- Gary Smulyan With Strings (1996) Criss Cross
- The Real Deal (2002) Reservoir
- More Treasures (2006) Reservoir
- Smul's Paradise (2011) Capri

With Jim Snidero

- Standards Plus (1997) Double-Time
- Tippin' (2007) Savant

With Benny Waters

- Birdland Birthday: Live at 95 (1997) Enja

With Cory Weeds

- Big Weeds (2008) Cellar Live
- Up a Step: The Music of Hank Mobley (2012) Cellar Live
- Condition Blue: The Music of Jackie McLean (2014) Cellar Live
- Let's Groove: The Music of Earth Wind & Fire (2017) Cellar Live
- O Sole Mio! Music From the Motherland (2019 [rel. 2021]) Cellar Live

With Laura Welland

- Dissertations on the State of Bliss (2004) OA2/Origin

With Saori Yano

- Sakura Stamp (2005) Columbia
