= Tenor Legacy =

Tenor Legacy may refer to the following jazz albums:

- Tenor Legacy (Joe Lovano album), 1993
- Tenor Legacy (Benny Golson album), 1996
