= Imagination (Woody Shaw album) =

Studio album by Woody Shaw
- Released: 1988
- Recorded: June 24, 1987
- Studio: Van Gelder Studio, Englewood Cliffs, New Jersey
- Genre: Jazz
- Length: 39:47
- Label: Muse; MR 5338
- Producer: Don Sickler

Woody Shaw chronology
The Eternal Triangle (1987)	Imagination (1988)

Imagination is the final studio album led by trumpeter Woody Shaw which was recorded in 1987 and released on the Muse label. Imagination was reissued by Mosaic Records as part of Woody Shaw: The Complete Muse Sessions in 2013.

== Reception ==
Professional ratings
Review scores
Source	Rating
Allmusic	4/5 stars
Philadelphia Inquirer	3/4 stars

Scott Yanow of Allmusic stated, "Trumpeter Woody Shaw's final album as a leader (cut less than two years before his death) is surprisingly upbeat. Although his health became shaky, Shaw never declined as a player, as he shows throughout the spirited quintet outing... Recommended".

== Track listing ==
1. "If I Were a Bell" (Frank Loesser) - 5:27
2. "Imagination" (Jimmy Van Heusen, Johnny Burke) - 7:28
3. "Dat Dere" (Bobby Timmons, Oscar Brown, Jr.) - 8:13
4. "You and the Night and the Music" (Howard Dietz, Arthur Schwartz) - 6:06
5. "Stormy Weather" (Harold Arlen, Ted Koehler) - 8:00
6. "Steve's Blues" (Steve Turre) - 4:48

== Personnel ==
- Woody Shaw - trumpet
- Steve Turre - trombone
- Kirk Lightsey - piano
- Ray Drummond - bass
- Carl Allen - drums
