= Tenor Legacy (Benny Golson album) =

Studio album by Benny Golson
- Released: June 16, 1998
- Recorded: January 29 & 30, 1996
- Studio: NYC
- Genre: Jazz
- Length: 61:22
- Label: Arkadia Jazz; 70742
- Producer: Makoto Kimata

Benny Golson chronology
That's Funky (1995)	Tenor Legacy (1998)	Up Jumped Benny (1997)

Tenor Legacy is an album by saxophonist/composer Benny Golson, that features tunes associated with ten prominent jazz tenor saxophonists, which was recorded in 1996 and originally released by the Japanese Keystone label before being re-released by the Arkadia Jazz label in 1998.

== Reception ==
Professional ratings
Review scores
Source	Rating
AllMusic	4/5 stars

The AllMusic review by Scott Yanow said "On this enjoyable set, veteran tenor saxophonist Benny Golson pays tribute to nine other tenors: Lester Young, Coleman Hawkins, Sonny Rollins, Dexter Gordon, John Coltrane, Stan Getz, Zoot Sims, Ben Webster, and Don Byas ... Golson sounds quite inspired by the settings. This is one of his strongest all-round sessions of the 1990s". All About Jazz's Jack Bowers stated "I've long held Golson in high regard, both as a player and writer; my admiration for the other horns on Tenor Legacy is, shall we say, somewhat less intense ... This is a colorful session with perceptive choices of melody and tempo. One's enjoyment may rest in part on the extent to which he fancies the horn section".

== Track listing ==
1. "Lester Leaps In" (Lester Young) – 3:54
2. "Body and Soul" (Johnny Green, Frank Eyton, Edward Heyman, Robert Sour) – 6:20
3. "St. Thomas" (Sonny Rollins) – 5:48
4. "Cry Me a River" (Arthur Hamilton) – 7:07
5. "My Favorite Things" (Richard Rodgers, Oscar Hammerstein II) – 5:05
6. "Whisper Not" (Benny Golson) – 9:18
7. "The Girl from Ipanema" (Antônio Carlos Jobim, Vinícius de Moraes, Norman Gimbel) – 4:54
8. "My Old Flame" (Arthur Johnston, Sam Coslow) – 6:40
9. "Lover, Come Back to Me" (Sigmund Romberg, Hammerstein) – 5:30
10. "In Memory Of" (Golson) – 6:46

== Personnel ==
- Benny Golson – tenor saxophone, arranger
- Harold Ashby (tracks 1, 3 & 7–9), James Carter (tracks 1 & 4–6), Branford Marsalis (track 2) – tenor saxophone
- Geoff Keezer – piano
- Dwayne Burno - bass
- Joe Farnsworth – drums

=== Production ===
- Makoto Kimata – producer
- Katsuhiko Naito – engineer
