= Benny Golson and the Philadelphians =

Studio album by Benny Golson
- Released: 1958
- Recorded: November 17, 1958; Nola's Penthouse Sound Studios, New York City
- Genre: Jazz
- Length: 37:09
- Label: United Artists; UAL 4020

Benny Golson chronology
| The Other Side of Benny Golson (1958) | Benny Golson and the Philadelphians (1958) | Gone with Golson (1959) |

Benny Golson and the Philadelphians is an album by saxophonist Benny Golson which was recorded in November and December 1958. Originally released on the United Artists label, the album was re-issued in 1998 on the Blue Note label with four additional bonus tracks.

== Reception ==
Professional ratings
Review scores
| Source | Rating |
|---|---|
| AllMusic | 4/5 stars |
| The Penguin Guide to Jazz Recordings | 3/4 stars |

Scott Yanow, in his review for AllMusic, says the album is "recommended for hard bop collectors".

== Track listing ==
All compositions by Benny Golson except as indicated

1. "You're Not the Kind" (Gigi Gryce) – 4:17
2. "Blues on My Mind" – 7:27
3. "Stablemates" – 5:44
4. "Thursday's Theme" – 7:35
5. "Afternoon in Paris" (John Lewis) – 6:50
6. "Calgary" (Ray Bryant) – 3:36
7. "Blues March" – 4:02 Bonus track on CD reissue
8. "I Remember Clifford" – 2:59 Bonus track on CD reissue
9. "Moanin'" (Bobby Timmons) – 6:04 Bonus track on CD reissue
10. "Stablemates" [2nd Version] – 8:07 Bonus track on CD reissue

== Personnel ==
- Benny Golson – tenor saxophone
- Lee Morgan – trumpet
- Ray Bryant — piano
- Percy Heath – bass
- Philly Joe Jones – drums

Bonus tracks recorded in Paris, France, on December 12, 1958

- Roger Guérin – trumpet
- Benny Golson – tenor saxophone
- Bobby Timmons – piano
- Pierre Michelot – bass
- Christian Garros – drums
