= Smokin' Out Loud =

Studio album by Mike LeDonne
- Released: April 6, 2004
- Recorded: November 5, 2003
- Studio: Van Gelder Studio, Englewood Cliffs, NJ
- Genre: Jazz
- Length: 63:13
- Label: Savant; SCD 2055
- Producer: Mike LeDonne

Mike LeDonne chronology
Bags Groove: A Tribute to Milt Jackson (2001)	Smokin' Out Loud (2004)	Night Song (2005)

Smokin' Out Loud is an album by organist Mike LeDonne which was recorded in 2003 and released on the Savant label early the following year.

== Reception ==
Professional ratings
Review scores
Source	Rating
Allmusic	4/5 stars
The Penguin Guide to Jazz Recordings	2.5/4 stars

In his review on Allmusic, Scott Yanow states "Mike LeDonne, who is better known as a pianist, is also a talented organist in the Jimmy Smith/Charles Earland/Don Patterson tradition. His quartet set is straight-ahead hard bop rather than soul-jazz ... Although nothing innovative or overly surprising occurs, the music is well played and Alexander in particular has plenty of spirited solos". On All About Jazz, Russ Musto called the album "Soul Stirring" and said "LeDonne's two-fisted sure-footed mastery of the Hammond B3 tradition is evident from the beginning"

== Track listing ==
1. "One for Don" (Mike LeDonne) – 7:55
2. "Delilah" (Victor Young) – 6:46
3. "After the Love Has Gone" (David Foster, Jay Graydon, Bill Champlin) – 6:48
4. "You'll See" (Jimmy Smith) – 4:57
5. "Superstar" (Bonnie Bramlett, Leon Russell) – 5:44
6. "Silverdust" (LeDonne) – 7:23
7. "French Spice" (Donald Byrd) – 9:12
8. "(They Long to Be) Close to You" (Burt Bacharach, Hal David) – 7:02
9. "Pisces Soul" (Howard McGhee) – 7:26

== Personnel ==
- Mike LeDonne – Hammond B-3
- Eric Alexander – tenor saxophone
- Peter Bernstein – guitar
- Joe Farnsworth – drums
