= Yesterday, Today and Forever =

Studio album by Shorty Rogers and Bud Shank
- Released: 1983
- Recorded: June 1983
- Studio: Sage and Sound Recording, Hollywood, CA
- Genre: Jazz
- Length: 43:35
- Label: Concord Jazz; CJ 223
- Producer: Bud Shank and Shorty Rogers

Bud Shank chronology
Brazilville (1981)	Yesterday, Today and Forever (1983)	Back Again (1984)

Shorty Rogers chronology
Re-Entry (1983)	Yesterday, Today and Forever (1983)	Back Again (1984)

Yesterday, Today and Forever is an album by saxophonist/flautist Bud Shank and flugelhornist/trumpeter Shorty Rogers recorded in 1983 and released on the Concord Jazz label.

== Reception ==
Professional ratings
Review scores
Source	Rating
AllMusic	4.5/5 stars

Scott Yanow, writing for AllMusic, commented: "Rogers is in pretty good form on the quintet date although occasionally overshadowed by altoist Bud Shank (who doubles on flute). The rhythm section is excellent, the repertoire is full of vehicles for swinging improvisations and the musicians sound fairly inspired. Recommended".

== Track listing ==
All compositions by Shorty Rogers, except where indicated.

1. "Budo" (Bud Powell, Miles Davis) - 5:09
2. "Blood Count" (Billy Strayhorn) - 6:27
3. "Yesterday, Today and Forever" - 7:29
4. "TNT" (Tiny Kahn) - 4:14
5. "Wagon Wheels" (Peter DeRose, Billy Hill) - 8:08
6. "Lotus Bud" - 5:21
7. "Have You Hugged a Martian Today" - 6:47

== Personnel ==
- Shorty Rogers - fluegelhorn, trumpet
- Bud Shank - alto saxophone, flute
- George Cables - piano
- Bob Magnusson - bass
- Roy McCurdy - drums
