= The Ballad Artistry of Milt Jackson =

Studio album by Milt Jackson
- Released: 1959
- Recorded: May 1, 1959; September 9–10, 1959
- Genre: Jazz
- Length: 38:12
- Label: Atlantic
- Producer: Nesuhi Ertegun

Milt Jackson chronology
Bags' Opus (1959)	The Ballad Artistry of Milt Jackson (1959)	Music from Odds Against Tomorrow (1959)

The Ballad Artistry of Milt Jackson is an album by vibraphonist Milt Jackson featuring performances recorded in 1959 and released on the Atlantic label.

== Reception ==
The AllMusic review awarded the album 3 stars. DownBeat gave the album 4 stars. The review called Jackson "a master balladeer . . . "the most expressive in jazz".

Professional ratings
Review scores
Source	Rating
AllMusic	3/5 stars
DownBeat	4/5 stars

== Track listing ==
All compositions are by Milt Jackson except as indicated:

1. "The Cylinder" - 2:45
2. "Makin' Whoopee" (Walter Donaldson, Gus Kahn) - 3:02
3. "Alone Together" (Howard Dietz, Arthur Schwartz) - 4:50
4. "Tenderly" (Walter Gross, Jack Lawrence) - 4:29
5. "Don't Worry 'Bout Me" (Rube Bloom, Ted Koehler) - 4:02
6. "Nuages" (Django Reinhardt) - 3:38
7. "Deep in a Dream" (Eddie DeLange, Jimmy van Heusen) - 3:39
8. "I'm a Fool to Want You" (Joel Herron, Frank Sinatra, Jack Wolf) - 4:39
9. "The Midnight Sun Will Never Set" (Dorcas Cochran, Quincy Jones, Henri Salvador) - 3:48
10. "Tomorrow" - 3:22

- Recorded in New York City on May 1, 1959 (tracks 6, 7, 9 & 10), September 9, 1959 (tracks 4, 5 & 8) and September 10, 1959 (tracks 1–3)

== Personnel ==
- Milt Jackson – vibes
- Don Hammond – alto flute
- Romeo Penque – reeds
- Max Cahn, Alexander Cores, Paul Gershman, Julius Held, Leo Kahn, Harry Katzman, Harry Lookofsky, David Nadien, George Ockner, Gene Orloff, Leonard Posner, Sol Shapiro – violin
- Al Brown, Harold Coletta, Burt Fisch, David Mankowitz – viola
- Maurice Brown, Charles McCracken, Harvey Shapiro, George Ricci – cello
- Gloria Agostini – harp
- Jimmy Jones – piano, arranger
- Barry Galbraith, Chuck Wayne – guitar
- Bill Crow, Milt Hinton – bass
- Connie Kay – drums
- Quincy Jones – arranger, conductor
