= Night Song (Mike LeDonne album) =

Studio album by Mike LeDonne
- Released: September 13, 2005
- Recorded: May 10, 2005
- Studio: Van Gelder Studio, Englewood Cliffs, NJ
- Genre: Jazz
- Length: 61:37
- Label: Savant; SCD 2067
- Producer: Don Sickler

Mike LeDonne chronology
Smokin' Out Loud (2004)	Night Song (2005)	On Fire: Live at Smoke (2006)

Night Song is an album by pianist Mike LeDonne which was recorded in 2005 and released on the Savant label.

== Reception ==
Professional ratings
Review scores
Source	Rating
Allmusic	4/5 stars
The Penguin Guide to Jazz Recordings	3.5/4 stars

In his review on Allmusic, Scott Yanow states "Pianist Mike LeDonne, whose main influence is McCoy Tyner, mostly sounds pretty original throughout this swinging trio set ... Mike LeDonne is the main star throughout and is heard in prime form. Recommended". In JazzTimes, Thomas Conrad wrote "LeDonne is a deeply middle-of-the-road mainstream-modern pianist who lacks any signature stylistic manifestations that would give his work a clearly identifiable personality. But he is highly proficient and swings at all tempos. He also has taste. Night Song is a quality project throughout"

== Track listing ==
1. "Night Song" (Lee Adams, Charles Strouse) – 6:43
2. "JB" (Mike LeDonne) – 5:31
3. "After the Rain" (John Coltrane) – 7:36
4. "I Should Care" (Axel Stordahl, Paul Weston, Sammy Cahn) – 7:54
5. "Don't You Worry 'bout a Thing" (Stevie Wonder) – 8:06
6. "In a Sentimental Mood" (Duke Ellington) – 6:25
7. "Toys" (Herbie Hancock) – 7:14
8. "Continuum" (LeDonne) – 7:26
9. "Alone Together" (Arthur Schwartz, Howard Dietz) – 4:42

== Personnel ==
- Mike LeDonne – piano
- Ron Carter – bass
- Joe Farnsworth – drums
