= The Eternal Triangle =

Studio album by Freddie Hubbard and Woody Shaw
- Released: 1987
- Recorded: June 11–12, 1987
- Genre: Jazz
- Label: Blue Note
- Producer: Michael Cuscuna

Freddie Hubbard chronology
Life Flight (1987)	The Eternal Triangle (1987)	Stardust (1987)

Woody Shaw chronology
In My Own Sweet Way (1987)	The Eternal Triangle (1987)	Imagination (1987)

Professional ratings
Review scores
Source	Rating
Allmusic	4/5 stars

The Eternal Triangle is an album by trumpeters Freddie Hubbard and Woody Shaw recorded in June 1987 and released on the Blue Note label. It features performances by Hubbard, Shaw, Ray Drummond, Carl Allen, Mulgrew Miller and Kenny Garrett. The album followed the first Hubbard/Shaw collaboration Double Take (1985) and the two volumes were combined for the double CD release The Complete Freddie Hubbard and Woody Shaw Sessions (1995).

== Track listing ==
1. "Down Under" (Hubbard) - 7:35
2. "The Eternal Triangle" (Sonny Stitt) - 7:49
3. "The Moontrane" (Shaw) - 6:30
4. "Calling Miss Khadija" (Lee Morgan) - 6:40
5. "Nostrand and Fulton" (Hubbard) - 6:12
6. "Tomorrow's Destiny" (Shaw) - 7:06
7. "São Paulo" (Kenny Dorham) - 8:13
8. "Reets and I" (Benny Harris) - 6:40

== Personnel ==
- Freddie Hubbard - trumpet, flugelhorn
- Woody Shaw - trumpet
- Kenny Garrett - alto saxophone, flute
- Mulgrew Miller - piano
- Ray Drummond - bass
- Carl Allen - drums

== See also ==
- List of jazz contrafacts
