= Testimonial (album) =

Studio album by Carl Allen
- Released: 1995
- Genre: Jazz, gospel
- Label: Atlantic
- Producer: Carl Allen, Yves Beauvais

Carl Allen chronology
The Pursuer (1994)	Testimonial (1995)

Testimonial is an album by the American drummer Carl Allen, released in 1995. It combines the musical styles of jazz and gospel. Allen supported the album with a North American tour.

== Production ==
Allen wrote the majority of the songs. "Come Sunday" is a cover of the Duke Ellington song. "Holy Land" was written by Cedar Walton. Cyrus Chestnut played the organ. Kevin Mahogany sang on "A City Called Heaven".

== Critical reception ==
Professional ratings
Review scores
Source	Rating
AllMusic	4/5 stars
Calgary Herald	C
The Encyclopedia of Popular Music	3/5 stars
MusicHound Jazz: The Essential Album Guide	4/5 stars
The Penguin Guide to Jazz on CD	3/4 stars

Westword called the album a mostly successful attempt "to infuse creative jazz with a heavy dose of spirituality." The Calgary Herald determined that, "as a drummer, [Allen] has little more to offer than brawn and metronomic timing." The Ottawa Citizen noted that "trumpeter Nicholas Payton has begun making his name with fiery, flawless playing."

The Washington Post wrote that "Tuesday Night Prayer Meeting" "boasts an infectious melody and has Allen sounding like a whole church full of hand-clapping worshipers." The Globe and Mail stated that Allen "explores the hidden and not-so-hidden connections between gospel music and hard bop." The New York Times deemed Testimonial "a religious concept album" on which "everyone is reluctant to relinquish his be-bop cool."

AllMusic wrote that there's "nothing in particular wrong with the music, which is heartily played and deeply felt ... except for the fact that it's covering ground that's been pretty much trampled into dust."

== Track listing ==
No.	Title	Length
1.	"Come Sunday"
2.	"Holy Land"
3.	"The Message"
4.	"Foot Pattin'"
5.	"Testimonial"
6.	"The Sacrifice"
7.	"The Presence of Dr. B"
8.	"Relativity"
9.	"Storefront Revival"
10.	"Tuesday Night Prayer Meeting"
11.	"Dark & Lovely"
12.	"A City Called Heaven"
