= Double Take (Freddie Hubbard and Woody Shaw album) =

Studio album by Freddie Hubbard & Woody Shaw
- Released: 1985
- Recorded: November 21–22, 1985
- Studio: Van Gelder Studio, Englewood Cliffs, NJ
- Genre: Jazz
- Length: 44:06
- Label: Blue Note
- Producer: Michael Cuscuna

Freddie Hubbard chronology
| The Rose Tattoo (1983) | Double Take (1985) | Life Flight (1987) |

Woody Shaw chronology
| Woody Shaw with the Tone Jansa Quartet (1985) | Double Take (1985) | Bemsha Swing (1986) |

Professional ratings
Review scores
| Source | Rating |
|---|---|
| Allmusic | 4.5/5 stars |

Double Take is an album by trumpeters Freddie Hubbard and Woody Shaw recorded in November 1985 and released on the Blue Note label. It features performances by Hubbard, Cecil McBee, Carl Allen, Mulgrew Miller and Kenny Garrett. The album was Hubbard's first for Blue Note since recording The Night of the Cookers (1965) twenty years previously.

== Reception ==
The Allmusic review by Scott Yanow states "Hubbard still gets the edge (his range is wider and he cannot be surpassed technically). Although Shaw tended to play more harmonically sophisticated lines and is remarkably inventive, they are both trumpet masters". The album was followed by a second Hubbard/Shaw collaboration The Eternal Triangle in 1987 and the two volumes were combined for the double CD release The Complete Freddie Hubbard and Woody Shaw Sessions (1995).

The album debuted on the Billboard Top Jazz Album chart on July 5, 1986 and would spend 12 weeks on the chart, eventually peaking at #19.

== Track listing ==
1. "Sandu" (Clifford Brown) - 4:28
2. "Boperation" (Howard McGhee, Fats Navarro) - 4:56
3. "Lament for Booker" (Freddie Hubbard, J. J. Johnson) - 6:22
4. "Hub-Tones" (Hubbard) - 6:25
5. "Desert Moonlight" (Lee Morgan) - 8:10
6. "Just a Ballad for Woody" (Woody Shaw) - 5:30
7. "Lotus Blossom" (Kenny Dorham) - 8:15

== Personnel ==
- Freddie Hubbard - trumpet, flugelhorn
- Woody Shaw - trumpet
- Kenny Garrett - alto saxophone, flute
- Mulgrew Miller - piano
- Cecil McBee - bass
- Carl Allen - drums
