= New Time, New 'Tet =

Studio album by Benny Golson
- Released: January 20, 2009
- Recorded: August 25 and September 29, 2008
- Studio: Bennett Studios, Englewood, NJ and G Studio Digital, Studio City, CA
- Genre: Jazz
- Length: 70:47
- Label: Concord; CJA-31121
- Producer: Benny Golson, Dennis Wall

Benny Golson chronology
Terminal 1 (2008)	New Time, New 'Tet (2009)	Horizon Ahead (2016)

New Time, New 'Tet is an album by saxophonist/composer Benny Golson that was recorded in 2008 and released on the Concord label the following year.

== Reception ==
Professional ratings
Review scores
Source	Rating
AllMusic	4/5 stars

The AllMusic review by Michael G. Nastos said "the watchwords for this recording are erudite, refined, intelligent, and above all, sophisticated. Appreciative veteran jazz lovers will want this excellent set of straight-ahead jazz from one of the true masters who needs to reclaim or affirm nothing in his decades as one of the true legends in American music".

All About Jazz's George Kanzler stated "He has displayed an unfailing gift for suave melodies combined with elaborate and sophisticated harmonies, all spiced with rhythms ranging from sultry saunters to high-stepping marches. And his playing, like his compositions, never relinquishes melody, no matter how baroque or extravagant his bebop-inspired harmonic flights may soar.".

JazzTimes' Perry Tannenbaum observed "Surprises are strewn along our path as Golson temporarily disregards Broadway in favor of Verdi and Chopin".

== Track listing ==
All compositions by Benny Golson except where noted

1. "Grove's Groove" (Steve Davis) – 8:33
2. "Airegin" (Sonny Rollins) – 6:45
3. "From Dream to Dream" – 7:35
4. "Whisper Not" – 4:38
5. "Epistrophy" (Thelonious Monk, Kenny Clarke) – 8:46
6. "L'Adieu" (Frédéric Chopin) – 5:40
7. "Love Me in a Special Way" (El DeBarge) – 7:07
8. "Gypsy Jingle-Jangle" – 7:14
9. "Verdi's Voice" (Giuseppe Verdi) – 7:26
10. "Uptown Afterburn" – 7:08

== Personnel ==
- Benny Golson – tenor saxophone
- Eddie Henderson – trumpet
- Steve Davis – trombone
- Mike LeDonne – piano
- Buster Williams – bass
- Carl Allen – drums
- Al Jarreau – vocals (track 4)

=== Production ===
- Benny Golson, Dennis Wall – producer
- Dennis Wall – engineer
