= Terminal 1 (album) =

Studio album by Benny Golson
- Released: June 22, 2004
- Recorded: February 24, 25 & 26, 2004
- Studio: 39th Street Studios, New York, NY
- Genre: Jazz
- Length: 69:09
- Label: Concord; CCD-2259-25
- Producer: John Burk

Benny Golson chronology
One Day, Forever (2001)	Terminal 1 (2004)	New Time, New 'Tet (2009)

Terminal 1 is an album by saxophonist/composer Benny Golson that was recorded in 2004 and released by the Concord label.

== Reception ==
Professional ratings
Review scores
Source	Rating
AllMusic	4/5 stars
The Penguin Guide to Jazz Recordings	3/4 stars

The AllMusic review by Matt Collar said: "Tying in with his cameo appearance in Steven Spielberg's film The Terminal, saxophonist Benny Golson returns with Terminal 1. Featuring more of his sophisticated and swinging tunes, the album finds Golson in top form on some of his best compositions in years ... Calling to mind the best Blue Note-era recordings, Terminal 1 is one flight of fancy not to be missed".

All About Jazz's Eric J. Iannelli stated: "Benny Golson is indisputably a fine tenor saxophonist, but at the end of his already long career he will probably be best remembered for the quality and breadth of his songwriting ... Terminal 1 is a solid, engaging album, full of some lively ensemble work and a showcase of new interpretations of familiar Golson songs next to at least one fresh chart and the two older standards ... It’s hardly a matter of settling for whatever Golson happens to be offering on account of his notoriety or his age. While Terminal 1 benefits from his experience, it’s as expressive and buoyant as anything Golson was doing with Blakey’s Jazz Messengers lineup fifty years ago".

JazzTimes's David Franklin observed: "As a player, Golson remains an awesome modern mainstream improviser, able to craft captivating and emotion-laden melodic lines while sailing through the chord changes with the ease afforded by his ultrasharp composer’s ear".

== Track listing ==
All compositions by Benny Golson except where noted

1. "Terminal 1" – 8:12
2. "Killer Joe" – 6:54
3. "Caribbean Drifting" – 6:27
4. "Park Avenue Petite" – 7:47
5. "Blues March" – 6:54
6. "Sweet Georgia Brown" (Ben Bernie, Maceo Pinkard, Kenneth Casey) – 5:34
7. "Cherry" (Don Redman, Ray Gilbert) – 8:32
8. "In Your Own Sweet Way" (Dave Brubeck) – 10:30
9. "Touch Me Lightly" – 8:27

== Personnel ==
- Benny Golson – tenor saxophone
- Eddie Henderson – trumpet, flugelhorn
- Mike LeDonne – piano
- Buster Williams - bass
- Carl Allen – drums

=== Production ===
- John Burk – producer
- Dennis Wall – engineer
