= Domingo (Benny Golson album) =

Studio album by Benny Golson Quintet with Curtis Fuller
- Released: 1992
- Recorded: November 11, 12 & 13, 1991
- Studio: Ferber Studios, Paris, France
- Genre: Jazz
- Length: 64:58
- Label: Dreyfus; FDM 36557-2
- Producer: Benny Golson, Francis Dreyfus

Benny Golson chronology
Benny Golson Quartet (1990)	Domingo (1992)	I Remember Miles (1992)

Domingo is an album by saxophonist/composer Benny Golson that was recorded in Paris in 1991 and released on the French Dreyfus label.

== Reception ==
Professional ratings
Review scores
Source	Rating
AllMusic	4/5 stars
The Penguin Guide to Jazz Recordings	3.5/4 stars

The AllMusic review by Scott Yanow said "Tenor-saxophonist Benny Golson reunites with his longtime associate Curtis Fuller for this enjoyable set of hard bop ... Golson and Fuller both sound very much in their musical prime. The tenor's sound at this point had become quite a bit harder than previously, at times fairly close to Archie Shepp's, but he swung as hard as ever. Fuller in contrast is unchanged from his earlier days. Together they play in top form".

== Track listing ==
All compositions by Benny Golson except where noted

1. "My Blues House" – 8:41
2. "Domingo" – 7:57
3. "In Your Own Sweet Way" (Dave Brubeck) – 9:34
4. "Thinking Mode" – 9:27
5. "Moment to Moment" – 6:48
6. "Time Speaks" – 9:20
7. "A La Mode" (Curtis Fuller) – 9:02
8. "Blues March" – 4:09

== Personnel ==
- Benny Golson – tenor saxophone
- Curtis Fuller – trombone
- Kevin Hays – piano
- James Genus - bass
- Tony Reedus – drums
- Jean-Loup Longnon – trumpet (track 8)
