= Life Flight (album) =

Studio album by Freddie Hubbard
- Released: 1987
- Recorded: January 23–24, 1987
- Genre: Jazz
- Length: 42:23
- Label: Blue Note
- Producer: Michael Cuscuna

Freddie Hubbard chronology
Double Take (1985)	Life Flight (1987)	The Eternal Triangle (1987)

Professional ratings
Review scores
Source	Rating
AllMusic	4/5 stars
Los Angeles Times	3.5/5 stars

Life Fight is an album by trumpeter Freddie Hubbard, recorded in January 1987 and released on the Blue Note label. It features performances by Hubbard, Larry Willis, Stanley Turrentine, George Benson, and Ralph Moore.

== Reception ==
The AllMusic review by Scott Yanow states:

This CD captures the great trumpeter Freddie Hubbard at the age of 48 just before he began to decline. Hubbard is heard in excellent shape on two selections apiece with two separate bands... Overall this set (from an era when the veteran trumpeter was being overshadowed by Wynton Marsalis) gives listeners one of the last opportunities to hear Freddie Hubbard in peak form".

Written shortly after the album's release, Los Angeles Times jazz reviewer Leonard Feather's assessment was somewhat more mixed:

In this Janus-faced album, Side 1 is another "Let's get Freddie to do something commercial" venture. He has been that route (and abandoned it) several times before, but on this occasion, with George Benson and Stanley Turrentine as guests, it comes off inoffensively. Side 2, with the trumpeter leading a straight-ahead quintet in two of his own works, achieves a splendid level of Hubbard heat in the title tune; after the placebo of Side 1, it's potent medicine. 3 1/2 stars.

== Track listing ==
1. Battlescar Galorica 8:48
2. A Saint's Homecoming Song 11:20
3. The Melting Pot 9:10
4. Life Flight 13:05

- Recorded at M&I Studios, New York City, on January 23 & 24, 1987

== Personnel ==
- Freddie Hubbard – trumpet, flugelhorn
- Larry Willis – piano, electric piano, synthesizer
- Stanley Turrentine – tenor saxophone (tracks 1 & 2)
- George Benson – guitar (tracks 1 & 2)
- Wayne Braithwaite – electric bass (tracks 1 & 2)
- Idris Muhammad – drums, tambourine (tracks 1 & 2)
- Ralph Moore – tenor saxophone (tracks 3 & 4)
- Rufus Reid – bass (tracks 3 & 4)
- Carl Allen – drums (tracks 3 & 4)

== Charts ==
Chart performance for Life Flight
Chart (1987)	Peak position
US Top Contemporary Jazz Albums (Billboard)	13
