= Stablemates (jazz composition) =

1955 jazz composition by Benny Golson

Stablemates is a jazz composition by the American saxophonist Benny Golson written in 1955. The song was first recorded by Miles Davis for the 1956 album Miles: The New Miles Davis Quintet. It is widely regarded as a jazz standard and has been recorded by many notable jazz artists.

== Background ==
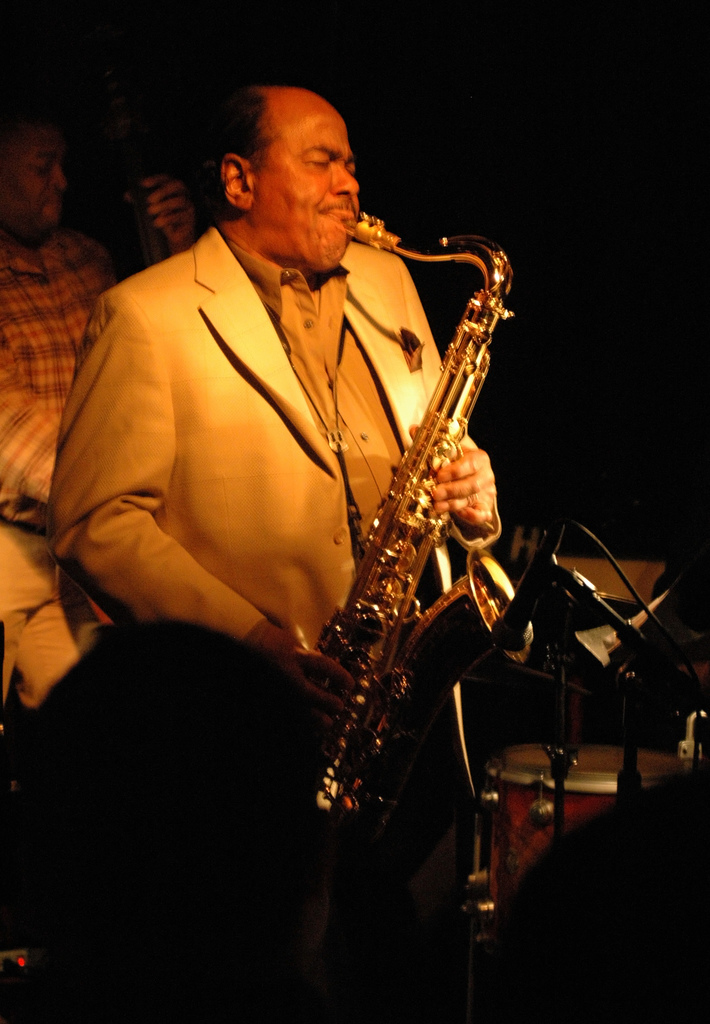
Benny Golson at the Smoke Jazz Club in 2006.

According to his autobiography, Golson wrote Stablemates while on the road with Earl Bostic in Wilmington, Delaware. His soon-to-be ex-wife was present with her friends, and he told her during intermission that he was busy with a "very important assignment" due the following morning. He wrote the first 14 bars of the song on the bandstand, and he initially thought the song was "demented". In the coming two days he spent on tour, he took those respective intermissions to write the song on the bandstand.

== Musical composition ==
The tune follows an ABA form. Written in D-flat major, the A sections are 14 bars each, while the bridge is 8 bars, for a total of 36 bars.

== Notable recordings ==
- Miles Davis (with John Coltrane) on Miles: The New Miles Davis Quintet (1956)
- Paul Chambers (also with Coltrane) on Chambers' Music (1956)
- Mal Waldron on Mal-1 (1957)
- Dizzy Gillespie on Dizzy in Greece (1957)
- Benny Golson on Benny Golson and the Philadelphians (1958): with Lee Morgan (trumpet), Ray Bryant (piano), Percy Heath (bass) and Philly Joe Jones (drums)
- Jackie McLean on Swing, Swang, Swingin' (1960)
