= One Day, Forever =

Studio album by Benny Golson
- Released: February 27, 2001
- Recorded: November 6, 1996, September 22, 1999 and October 11, 2000
- Studio: Sandhausen Studios, Germany, Avatar Studios, New York, NY, 39th Street Music, NYC and Patrych Recording, NY
- Genre: Jazz
- Length: 63:00
- Label: Arkadia Jazz; 70744
- Producer: Bob Karcy

Benny Golson chronology
| Remembering Clifford (1997) | One Day, Forever (2001) | Terminal 1 (2004) |

One Day, Forever is an album by saxophonist/composer Benny Golson that was recorded between 1996 and 2000 and released by the Arkadia Jazz label in 2001.

== Reception ==
Professional ratings
Review scores
| Source | Rating |
|---|---|
| AllMusic | 4.5/5 stars |
| All About Jazz | 4/5 stars |

The AllMusic review by Ken Dryden said "Benny Golson has made many excellent recordings over the decades, but One Day, Forever is in a class by itself". All About Jazz stated "The result is a CD in three mentalities, all of which are contained by Golson's imagination: the famous sextet sound that produced numbers like “Killer Joe,” a string orchestra backing Shirley Horn as she sings the words to Golson's new music, and a piano piece introducing Golson's first classical composition. While not consistent in theme, One Day, Forever does reveal in startling contrast the creative curiosity of Benny Golson ... Certainly, one could say that One Day, Forever contains something for everyone". JazzTimes' Harvey Siders observed "One Day Forever is a tour de force for Benny Golson. This is an elaborate sampler of his talents as composer-arranger, lyricist and tenor saxophonist ... So many facets of Benny Golson are on display here".

== Track listing ==
All compositions by Benny Golson

1. "One Day, Forever (I Remember Miles)" – 5:08
2. "Blue Walk" – 6:18
3. "Killer Joe" – 7:54
4. "Are You Real?" – 6:59
5. "Sad to Say" – 4:46
6. "Out of the Past" – 9:18
7. "Blues Alley" – 4:13
8. "Along Came Betty" – 7:36
9. "On Gossamer Wings" – 10:20

== Personnel ==
Tracks 2–4 & 6–8:

- Benny Golson – tenor saxophone
- Art Farmer – trumpet
- Curtis Fuller – trombone
- Geoff Keezer – piano
- Dwayne Burno – bass
- Joe Farnsworth – drums

Tracks 1 & 5:

- Benny Golson – tenor saxophone, arranger, conductor
- Robert Carlisle, John Clark – French horn
- Elizabeth Mann – flute
- Gerard Reuter – oboe
- Mulgrew Miller – piano
- Bill Mays – keyboards
- Ron Carter – bass
- Carl Allen – drums
- Shirley Horn – vocals
- Clay Ruede, David Heiss, Diane Barere, Eliana Mendoza, Erik Friedlander, Eugene Moye, Frederick Zlotkin, Jeanne Leblanc, Joseph Kimura, Lanny Paykin, Maxine Neuman, Richard Locker – cello

Track 9:

- Lara Downes – piano

=== Production ===
- Bob Karcy – producer
- Dennis Wall – engineer
