= Gettin' with It =

Studio album by Benny Golson
- Released: 1960
- Recorded: December 23, 1959
- Studio: Van Gelder Studio, Englewood Cliffs, New Jersey
- Genre: Jazz
- Length: 37:16
- Label: New Jazz; NJLP 8248
- Producer: Esmond Edwards

Benny Golson chronology
Winchester Special (1959)	Gettin' with It (1960)	Meet the Jazztet (1960)

Gettin' with It is the seventh album by saxophonist Benny Golson featuring performances recorded in 1959 and originally released on the New Jazz label.

== Reception ==
Professional ratings
Review scores
Source	Rating
AllMusic	4/5 stars
DownBeat	4.5/5 stars
The Penguin Guide to Jazz Recordings	3/4 stars

The contemporaneous DownBeat reviewer praised the entire band as: "certainly among the most creative and swinging men on their respective instruments". The AllMusic review calls it "one of Benny Golson's best dates as a leader because one not only gets to enjoy his always strong arrangements, but his consistently first-rate tenor sax solos. Highly recommended".

== Track listing ==
All compositions by Benny Golson except where noted

1. "Baubles, Bangles & Beads" (Alexander Borodin, George Forrest, Robert Wright) – 6:16
2. "April in Paris" (Vernon Duke, E.Y. "Yip" Harburg) – 5:07
3. "Blue Streak" – 6:55
4. "Tippin' on Thru" – 6:40
5. "Bob Hurd's Blues" – 12:18

== Personnel ==
- Benny Golson – tenor saxophone
- Curtis Fuller – trombone
- Tommy Flanagan – piano
- Doug Watkins – bass
- Art Taylor – drums
