= Stardust (Benny Golson album) =

Studio album by Benny Golson featuring Freddie Hubbard
- Released: 1987
- Recorded: June 22 & 23, 1987
- Studio: Clinton Recording Studios, NYC
- Genre: Jazz
- Length: 67:03 CD release with additional tracks
- Label: Denon; CY-1838
- Producer: Tatsunori Konno

Benny Golson chronology
This Is for You, John (1984)	Stardust (1987)	Benny Golson's New York Orchestra (1989)

Freddie Hubbard chronology
The Eternal Triangle (1987)	Stardust (1987)	Feel the Wind (1988)

The Jazz Masters Cover

Stardust is an album by saxophonist/composer Benny Golson featuring trumpeter Freddie Hubbard that was recorded in 1987 and originally released on the Japanese Denon label. The album was reissued on the LRC label in 2006.

== Reception ==
Professional ratings
Review scores
Source	Rating
AllMusic	4/5 stars

The AllMusic review by Scott Yanow said "Hubbard was in prime form during this period, and the repertoire provides inspiration for some excellent hard bop-oriented solos. Worth searching for.".

== Track listing ==
All compositions by Benny Golson except where noted

1. "Stardust" (Hoagy Carmichael, Mitchell Parish) – 9:18
2. "Double Bass" (Ron Carter) – 9:20
3. "Gipsy Jingle-Jangle" – 4:41
4. "Povo" (Freddie Hubbard) – 12:13
5. "Love Is a Many Splendored Thing" (Sammy Fain, Paul Francis Webster) – 7:29
6. "Sad to Say" – 10:16 Additional track on CD release
7. "Far Away" (Hubbard) – 13:46 Additional track on CD release

== Personnel ==
- Benny Golson – tenor saxophone
- Freddie Hubbard – trumpet, flugelhorn
- Mulgrew Miller – piano
- Ron Carter - bass
- Marvin "Smitty" Smith – drums

=== Production ===
- Tatsunori Konno – producer
- Ed Rak – engineer
