= One More Mem'ry =

Studio album by Benny Golson Quintet featuring Curtis Fuller
- Released: 1982
- Recorded: August 19 & 20, 1981
- Studio: A&M Studios Los Angeles, CA
- Genre: Jazz
- Length: 46:59
- Label: Baystate; RJL 8026
- Producer: Makoto Kimata

Benny Golson chronology
California Message (1981)	One More Mem'ry (1982)	Time Speaks (1983)

One More Mem'ry is an album by saxophonist/composer Benny Golson that was recorded in 1981 and released on the Japanese Baystate label the following year. The album features trombonist Curtis Fuller and was reissued on the Dutch Timeless label in 1984.

Professional ratings
Review scores
Source	Rating
AllMusic	4/5 stars

== Track listing ==
All compositions by Benny Golson except where noted

1. "One More Mem'ry" – 8:32
2. "Out of the Past" – 8:27
3. "Sweetness" (Curtis Fuller) – 6:44
4. "Five Spot After Dark" – 6:05
5. "Touch Me Lightly" – 6:03
6. "Sad to Say" – 7:04
7. "Once Again" – 4:04

== Personnel ==
- Benny Golson – tenor saxophone
- Curtis Fuller – trombone
- Bill Mays – piano
- Bob Magnusson - bass
- Roy McCurdy – drums

=== Production ===
- Makoto Kimata – producer
- Kenny Present – engineer
