= Time Speaks =

Studio album by Benny Golson with Freddie Hubbard and Woody Shaw
- Released: 1983
- Recorded: December 7 & 8, 1982
- Studio: Van Gelder Studio, Englewood Cliffs, NJ
- Genre: Jazz
- Length: 49:23
- Label: Baystate; RJL 8054
- Producer: Makoto Kimata

Benny Golson chronology
One More Mem'ry (1982)	Time Speaks (1983)	This Is for You, John (1984)

Freddie Hubbard chronology
Back to Birdland (1983)	Time Speaks (1983)	Sweet Return (1983)

Woody Shaw chronology
Night Music (1982)	Time Speaks (1983)	The Time Is Right (1983)

Timeless Cover

Time Speaks, subtitled Dedicated to the Memory of Clifford Brown, is an album by saxophonist/composer Benny Golson that was recorded in 1982 and released on the Japanese Baystate label the following year. The album features trumpeters Freddie Hubbard and Woody Shaw performing tunes associated with, or inspired by, Clifford Brown and was reissued on the Dutch Timeless label in 1984.

== Reception ==
Professional ratings
Review scores
Source	Rating
AllMusic	4/5 stars

The AllMusic review by Scott Yanow said "This set was chiefly notable for teaming together for the first time trumpeters Freddie Hubbard and Woody Shaw. Ostensibly a tribute to Clifford Brown, the sextet date only has two songs actually played by Brown. No matter; it is for the Hubbard-Shaw matchup that this straight-ahead outing is mostly recommended, as the two trumpeters provide most of the fireworks".

== Track listing ==
All compositions by Benny Golson, except where noted

1. "I'll Remember April" (Gene de Paul, Patricia Johnston and Don Raye) – 8:00
2. "Time Speaks" – 10:27
3. "No Dancin'" – 7:01
4. "Jordu" (Duke Jordan) – 10:38
5. "Blues for Duane" (Freddie Hubbard) – 5:14
6. "Theme for Maxine" (Woody Shaw) – 8:18

== Personnel ==
- Benny Golson – tenor saxophone
- Freddie Hubbard, Woody Shaw – trumpet
- Kenny Barron – piano
- Cecil McBee – bass
- Ben Riley – drums

=== Production ===
- Makoto Kimata – producer
- Rudy Van Gelder – engineer
