= Benny Golson Quartet Live =

Live album by Benny Golson Quartet
- Released: 1991
- Recorded: February 3, 1989
- Venue: OK Village, Portomaggiore, Italy
- Genre: Jazz
- Length: 65:59
- Label: Dreyfus; FDM 36552-2

Benny Golson chronology
Benny Golson's New York Orchestra (1989)	Benny Golson Quartet Live (1991)	Benny Golson Quartet (1990)

Benny Golson Quartet Live is a live album by saxophonist/composer Benny Golson that was recorded in Italy in 1989 and released on the French Dreyfus label.

== Reception ==
Professional ratings
Review scores
Source	Rating
AllMusic	3/5 stars

The AllMusic review by Dave Nathan said "With live sessions there's a special vitality and excitement that's missing from a studio recording as the players feed off each other and the audience. Not constrained by time limitations or technical barriers, the quartet lets its collective hair down for 67 minutes of intelligent, but somewhat subdued, improvisation ... This is a good, solid quartet recording".

== Track listing ==
All compositions by Benny Golson except where noted

1. "Sweet and Lovely" (Gus Arnheim, Jules LeMare, Harry Tobias) – 13:47
2. "Along Came Betty" – 11:47
3. "I Remember Clifford" – 12:13
4. "The Cup Bearers" (Tom McIntosh) – 16:51
5. "Jam the Avenue" – 11:21

== Personnel ==
- Benny Golson – tenor saxophone
- Mulgrew Miller – piano
- Peter Washington - bass
- Tony Reedus – drums
