= The Modern Touch =

Studio album by The Benny Golson Sextet
- Released: 1958
- Recorded: December 19 & 23, 1957; Reeves Sound Studios, New York City
- Genre: Jazz
- Length: 39:37
- Label: Riverside; RLP 12-256
- Producer: Orrin Keepnews

Benny Golson chronology
| Benny Golson's New York Scene (1957) | The Modern Touch (1958) | The Other Side of Benny Golson (1958) |

Professional ratings
Review scores
| Source | Rating |
|---|---|
| Allmusic | 4/5 stars |
| The Penguin Guide to Jazz Recordings | 3/4 stars |

The Modern Touch is the second album by saxophonist Benny Golson featuring performances recorded in late 1957 and originally released on the Riverside label.

== Reception ==
The Allmusic review by Scott Yanow states: "Excellent playing on an above-average set that defines the modern mainstream of 1957 jazz."

== Track listing ==
All compositions by Benny Golson except as indicated

1. "Out of the Past" - 6:22
2. "Reunion" (Gigi Gryce) - 7:14
3. "Venetian Breeze" - 5:38
4. "Hymn to the Orient" (Gryce) - 4:07
5. "Namely You" (Gene de Paul, Johnny Mercer) - 4:42
6. "Blues on Down" - 11:34

== Personnel ==
- Benny Golson - tenor saxophone
- Kenny Dorham - trumpet
- J. J. Johnson - trombone
- Wynton Kelly - piano
- Paul Chambers - bass
- Max Roach - drums
