= This Is for You, John =

Studio album by Benny Golson
- Released: 1984
- Recorded: December 20–21, 1983
- Studio: Vanguard Studios New York, NY
- Genre: Jazz
- Length: 42:51
- Label: Baystate; RJL 8092
- Producer: Benny Golson, Fumimaru Kawashima

Benny Golson chronology
Time Speaks (1983)	This Is for You, John (1984)	Stardust (1988)

This Is for You, John is an album by saxophonist/composer Benny Golson that was recorded in 1983 and released on the Japanese Baystate label the following year. The album features saxophonist Pharoah Sanders performing tunes associated with, or inspired by, John Coltrane and was reissued on the Dutch Timeless label in 1986.

== Reception ==
Professional ratings
Review scores
Source	Rating
AllMusic	4/5 stars

The AllMusic review by Steve Loewy said "While Sanders might seem a strange stylistic choice due to his scorching, free-style performances with Coltrane, he is, in fact, the only one of this group who recorded regularly with Coltrane, and he performs here totally within the hard bop context of the recording. Golson carefully chooses the tunes, including the lovely "Greensleeves," as well as four by Golson and one by Sanders. Most relate to Trane in some way, although Golson wisely eschews any kind of retrospective. Thankfully, too, the saxophonists never engage in any cutting, so the results are uniformly delightful, if somewhat conservative".

== Track listing ==
All compositions by Benny Golson except where noted

1. "Jam the Avenue" – 5:01
2. "Greensleeves" (Traditional) – 6:28
3. "Origin" (Pharoah Sanders) – 4:25
4. "A Change of Heart" – 7:25
5. "Times Past (This Is for You, John)" – 7:55
6. "Page 12" – 5:25
7. "Vilia" (Franz Lehár) – 6:21

== Personnel ==
- Benny Golson, Pharoah Sanders – tenor saxophone
- Cedar Walton – piano
- Ron Carter - bass
- Jack DeJohnette – drums

=== Production ===
- Benny Golson, Fumimaru Kawashima – producer
- David Baker – engineer
