= Benny Golson's New York Scene =

Studio album by Benny Golson
- Released: January 1959
- Recorded: October 14 & 17, 1957; New York City
- Genre: Jazz
- Length: 38:24
- Label: Contemporary; C 3552
- Producer: Nat Hentoff

Benny Golson chronology
Benny Golson's New York Scene (1959)	The Modern Touch (1957)

Benny Golson's New York Scene is the debut album by saxophonist Benny Golson featuring performances recorded in late 1957 and originally released on the Contemporary label.

== Reception ==
Professional ratings
Review scores
Source	Rating
Allmusic	4.5/5 stars
The Rolling Stone Jazz Record Guide	4/5 stars
The Penguin Guide to Jazz Recordings	3/4 stars

John S. Wilson's contemporaneous review was positive, noting that both quintet and nonet bands feature "Farmer playing with broad authority no matter what the fare at hand while Golson's warm, dark lines flare and glide through all the pieces." Scott Yanow of Allmusic stated, "this underrated gem served as a strong start to Benny Golson's influential solo career".

== Track listing ==
All compositions by Benny Golson except as indicated.

1. "Something in B flat" (Ray Bryant) - 6:04
2. "Whisper Not" - 6:01
3. "Step Lightly" - 6:54
4. "Just by Myself" - 4:12
5. "Blues It" - 6:52
6. "You're Mine, You" (Johnny Green, Edward Heyman) - 4:22
7. "Capri" (Gigi Gryce) - 3:59
8. "B.G.'s Holiday" - 5:34 Bonus track on CD

== Personnel ==
- Benny Golson - tenor saxophone
- Art Farmer - trumpet
- Jimmy Cleveland - trombone (tracks 2, 4 & 7)
- Julius Watkins - French horn (tracks 2, 4 & 7)
- Gigi Gryce - alto saxophone (tracks 2, 4 & 7)
- Sahib Shihab - baritone saxophone (tracks 2, 4 & 7)
- Wynton Kelly - piano
- Paul Chambers - bass
- Charlie Persip - drums
