= Gone with Golson =

Studio album by Benny Golson
- Released: 1959
- Recorded: June 20, 1959
- Studio: Van Gelder Studio, Hackensack, New Jersey
- Genre: Jazz
- Length: 40:33
- Label: New Jazz; NJLP 8235
- Producer: Esmond Edwards

Benny Golson chronology
Benny Golson and the Philadelphians (1958)	Gone with Golson (1959)	The Curtis Fuller Jazztet (1959)

Gone with Golson is the fifth album by saxophonist Benny Golson featuring performances recorded in 1959 and originally released on the New Jazz label.

== Reception ==
Professional ratings
Review scores
Source	Rating
Allmusic	4/5 stars
The Penguin Guide to Jazz Recordings	3.5/4 stars

The Allmusic review by Scott Yanow described the album as "a fine example of hard bop of the late '50s".

== Track listing ==
All compositions by Benny Golson, except where noted.

1. "Staccato Swing" (Ray Bryant) – 4:49
2. "Autumn Leaves" (Joseph Kosma, Johnny Mercer, Jacques Prévert) – 6:48
3. "Soul Me" – 6:37
4. "Blues After Dark" – 8:37
5. "Jam for Bobbie" – 9:21
6. "A Bit of Heaven" (Curtis Fuller) – 4:21 Bonus track on CD

== Personnel ==
- Benny Golson – tenor saxophone
- Curtis Fuller – trombone
- Ray Bryant – piano
- Tommy Bryant – bass
- Al Harewood – drums
