= The Other Side of Benny Golson =

Studio album by Benny Golson
- Released: 1958
- Recorded: November 12, 1958; Nola's Penthouse Sound Studios, New York City
- Genre: Jazz
- Length: 37:09
- Label: Riverside; RLP 12-290
- Producer: Orrin Keepnews

Benny Golson chronology
The Modern Touch (1957)	The Other Side of Benny Golson (1958)	Benny Golson and the Philadelphians (1958)

The Other Side of Benny Golson is the third album by saxophonist Benny Golson featuring performances recorded in late 1958 and originally released on the Riverside label.

== Reception ==
Professional ratings
Review scores
Source	Rating
Allmusic	4/5 stars
The Penguin Guide to Jazz Recordings	3/4 stars

Scott Yanow of Allmusic says, "Tenor-saxophonist Benny Golson's third recording as a leader was significant in two ways. It was his first opportunity to work with trombonist Curtis Fuller (the two would be members of The Jazztet by 1960) and it was one of his first chances to really stretch out on record as a soloist; up to this point Golson was possibly better known as a composer".

== Track listing ==
All compositions by Benny Golson except as indicated

1. "Strut Time" - 6:03
2. "Jubilation" (Junior Mance) - 6:18
3. "Symptoms" (Curtis Fuller) - 5:58
4. "Are You Real?" - 5:37
5. "Cry a Blue Tear" - 5:20
6. "This Night" (Richard Evans) - 7:50

== Personnel ==
- Benny Golson - tenor saxophone
- Curtis Fuller - trombone
- Barry Harris - piano
- Jymie Merritt - bass
- Philly Joe Jones - drums
