= Remembering Clifford =

Studio album by Benny Golson Group
- Released: May 19, 1998
- Recorded: March 30 & 31, 1997
- Studio: Sound on Sound, New York, NY
- Genre: Jazz
- Length: 65:40
- Label: Milestone; MCD 9278
- Producer: Makoto Kimata

Benny Golson chronology
Up Jumped Benny (1997)	Remembering Clifford (1998)	One Day, Forever (2001)

Remembering Clifford is an album by the saxophonist/composer Benny Golson, recorded in 1997 and released on the Milestone label the following year.

== Reception ==
Professional ratings
Review scores
Source	Rating
AllMusic	4/5 stars
The Penguin Guide to Jazz Recordings	3/4 stars

The AllMusic review by Cub Koda stated: "Benny Golson was moved by the death of bop trumpeter Clifford Brown to pen the classic 'I Remember Clifford'. Now presented with the opportunity to do an album in honor of his old friend, Golson assembles a sextet and presents an album that takes the idea of 'I Remember Clifford', thoroughly updates it, and extends it across an hour of great music on this disc ... With some great music on tap, there's no level at which this album does not succeed".

JazzTimes' Bill Bennett observed: "Benny Golson has produced some of the finest compositions in the hard bop tradition, foremost among them his elegy for Brownie, 'I Remember Clifford'. Trading on that is surely Golson’s right, even after 40 years-perhaps because after 40 years-we know for a fact that the tune is a certifiable classic".

== Track listing ==
All compositions by Benny Golson except where noted

1. "Brown Immortal" – 7:23
2. "Five Spot After Dark" – 7:31
3. "Dear Old Stockholm" (Traditional) – 8:22
4. "Matinee" – 5:50
5. "You're the First to Know" – 6:25
6. "Lullaby of Birdland" (George Shearing, George David Weiss) – 9:01
7. "Tito Puente" – 7:23
8. "Horizon Ahead" – 5:57
9. "Ever More" – 7:48

== Personnel ==
- Benny Golson – tenor saxophone
- John Swana – trumpet
- Ron Blake – tenor saxophone
- Mike LeDonne – piano
- Peter Washington - bass
- Joe Farnsworth – drums
- Tito Puente, Carlos "Patato" Valdes – percussion (track 7)

=== Production ===
- Makoto Kimata – producer
- Philip Klum – engineer
