= Earle Theatre =

Former theater in Pennsylvania, US

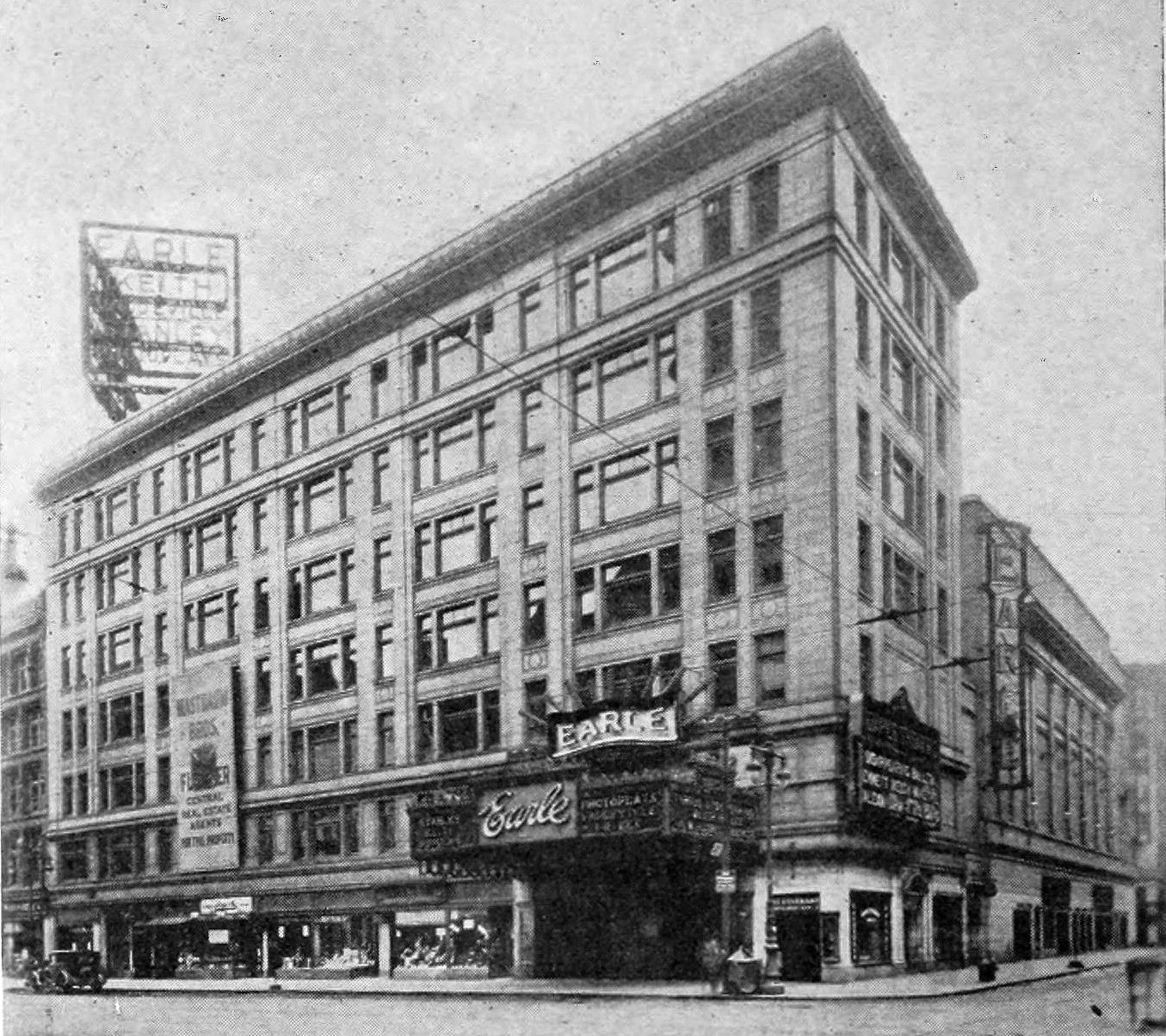
The Earle Theater in 1928

The Earle Theatre was a 2768-seat theater in Philadelphia, Pennsylvania, United States at 1046 Market Street, on the southeast corner of South 11th Street. It is associated with being a thriving venue for big band jazz music in the 1930s and 1940s.

== History ==
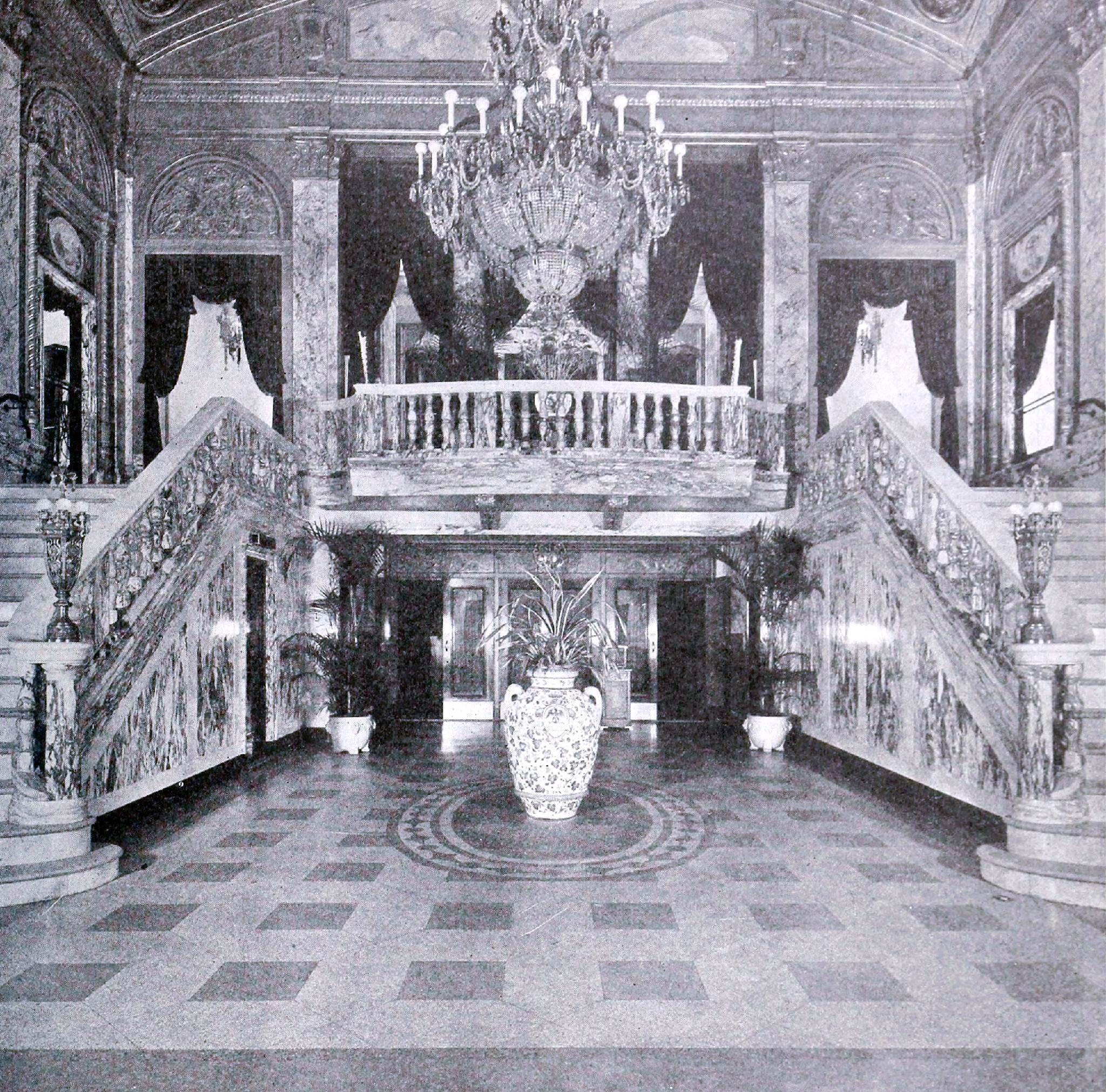
Earle Theatre main lobby in 1928

The theater, the most expensive venue in Philadelphia at the time of its opening on March 24, 1924, was originally called the Elrae (Earle spelled backwards), after Stanley Corporation stockholder George H. Earle. It was initially made for Vaudeville performances but was later adapted to a movie cinema. The theater was a thriving venue for theatrical stage performances, films, and big band jazz music in the 1930s and 1940s, nurturing talents such as Duke Ellington, Benny Goodman and Billy Eckstine. The Count Basie Orchestra opened a one-week engagement at the Earle Theatre on Friday, January 23, 1942, breaking opening records. Basie also played at the Downbeat jazz club while in Philadelphia. Cab Calloway had an annual concert at the theater.

The theater returned to Vaudeville for periods, including April 1931 and September 1940, with a four-week production of Boom Town. By 1953 the popularity of the theater had declined due to the growth of television, and the last stage show was given on February 26, 1953. The theater was demolished later that year and replaced with a two-story department store.

== Architecture ==
At the time of construction in 1923, the theater was the costliest theater ever constructed in Philadelphia. The opulent grand theater in the Italian renaissance style contained 2768 seats, of which 1164 seats were on the balcony. The stage measured 62 feet by 35 feet. George Matthews Harding painted the extravagant murals and friezes, and marble was imported from Italy.

== Notable recordings ==
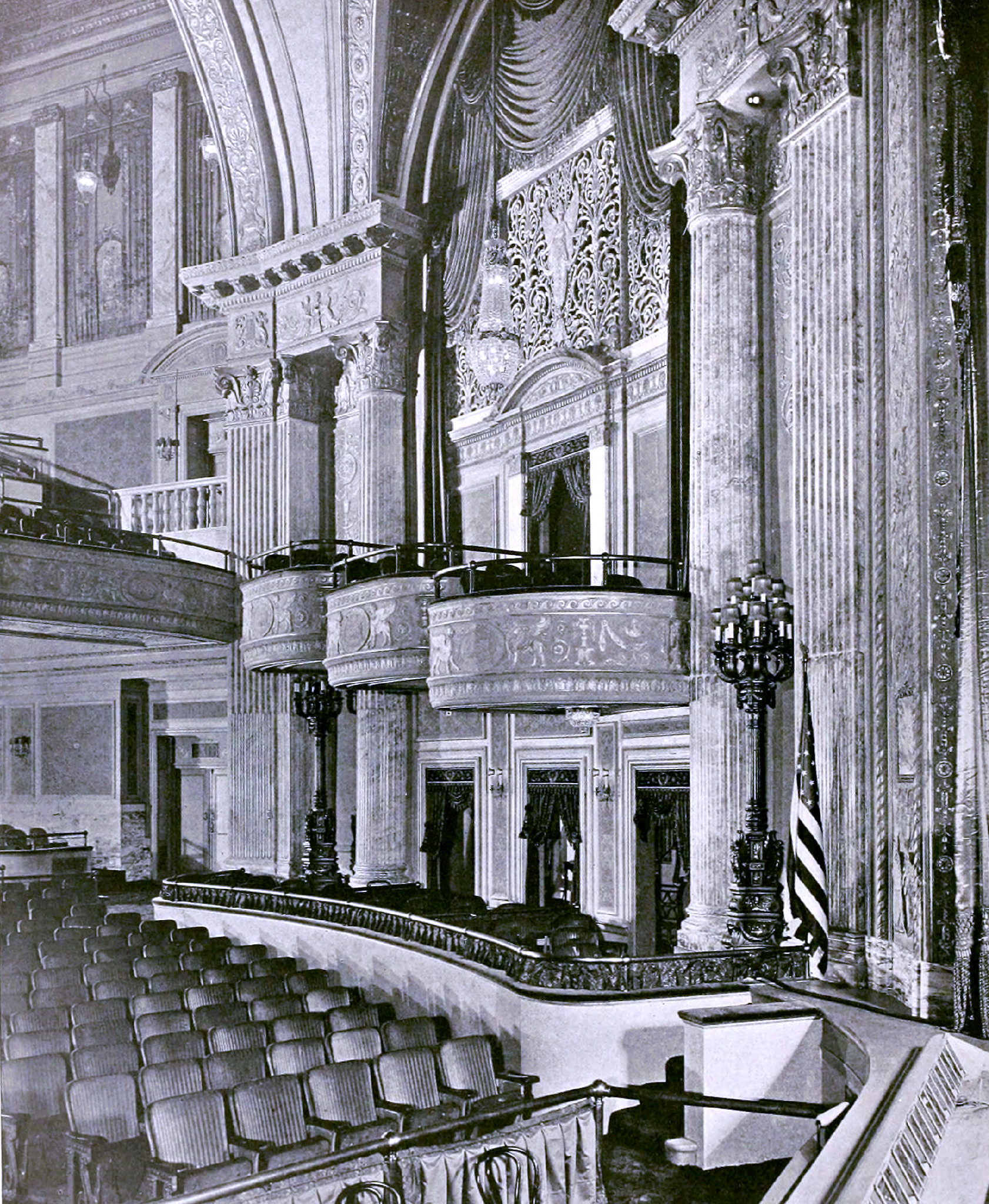
Proscenium and side arches of the Earle theater in 1928

- 1939: Jimmie Lunceford and His Orchestra: Live 1939 at the "Earle Theatre", Philadelphia.
