= Benny Golson Quartet =

Studio album by Benny Golson
- Released: 1990
- Recorded: June 20 & 21, 1990
- Studio: Clinton Recording Studios, NYC
- Genre: Jazz
- Length: 61:23
- Label: LRC Ltd. CDC 9018
- Producer: Dan Lester

Benny Golson chronology
Benny Golson Quartet Live (1991)	Benny Golson Quartet (1990)	Domingo (1991)

Benny Golson Quartet, also released as Up, Jumped, Spring, is an album by saxophonist/composer Benny Golson that was recorded in 1990 and originally released by the LRC Ltd. label.

== Reception ==
Professional ratings
Review scores
Source	Rating
AllMusic	4.5/5 stars

The AllMusic review by Scott Yanow said " the music is excellent ... Golson is heard throughout in top form, stretching himself on Freddie Hubbard's "Up Jumped Spring" (listed as an original called "Up, Jump, Spring!"), Kenny Barron's "Voyage" and his own "Stable Mates." On the latter, Golson plays an effective and intense duet with drummer Reedus. 61 at the time, Benny Golson is heard here at the peak of his powers".

== Track listing ==
All compositions by Benny Golson except where noted

1. "Up Jumped Spring" (Freddie Hubbard) – 10:10
2. "Voyage" (Kenny Barron) – 7:50
3. "Beautiful Love" (Wayne King, Victor Young, Egbert Van Alstyne, Haven Gillespie) – 14:50
4. "Goodbye" (Gordon Jenkins) – 7:30
5. "Gypsy Jingle Jangle" – 10:05
6. "Stablemates" – 10:58

== Personnel ==
- Benny Golson – tenor saxophone
- Mulgrew Miller – piano
- Rufus Reid - bass
- Tony Reedus – drums

=== Production ===
- Dan Lester – producer
