= Horizon Ahead =

Studio album by Benny Golson
- Released: April 15, 2016
- Recorded: December 7, 2015
- Studio: The Samurai Hotel Recording Studio, Astoria, NY
- Genre: Jazz
- Length: 54:53
- Label: HighNote; HCD 7288
- Producer: Benny Golson

Benny Golson chronology
| New Time, New 'Tet (2008) | Horizon Ahead (2016) |

Horizon Ahead is an album by saxophonist/composer Benny Golson that was recorded in 2015 and released on the HighNote label the following year.

== Reception ==
Professional ratings
Review scores
| Source | Rating |
|---|---|
| All About Jazz | 4/5 stars |

All About Jazz's Jack Bowers stated "At age eighty-seven, saxophonist Benny Golson is one of the last surviving links to the Golden Age of modern jazz... If time has dulled Golson's razor-sharp mind or degraded his admirable technique, it's certainly not apparent on Horizon Ahead, on which Golson is in total command of a much-more-youthful rhythm section ... Benny Golson not only keeps working but showing a younger generation that when it comes to contemporary jazz, maturity and experience are dependable allies in the ongoing battle with Father Time. It is, of course, a battle that can never be won, but Golson proves on Horizon Ahead that when his time comes, he'll definitely go down swinging".

JazzTimes' Evan Haga observed "Neither blowing session nor conceptual work, Horizon Ahead is simply terrific".

== Track listing ==
All compositions by Benny Golson except where noted

1. "Don't Get Around Much Anymore" (Duke Ellington, Bob Russell) – 6:16
2. "Jump Start" – 3:10
3. "Horizon Ahead" – 6:03
4. "Mood Indigo" (Ellington, Barney Bigard, Irving Mills) – 4:16
5. "Domingo" – 8:41
6. "Lulu's Back In Town" (Harry Warren, Al Dubin) – 4:40
7. "Night Shade" – 5:28
8. "Three Little Words" (Harry Ruby, Bert Kalmar) – 5:57
9. Spoken introduction – 2:39
10. "Out of the Darkness, and Into the Light" (Carl Allen) – 7:43

== Personnel ==
- Benny Golson – tenor saxophone
- Mike LeDonne – piano
- Buster Williams - bass
- Carl Allen – drums

=== Production ===
- Joe Fields – executive producer
- Dennis Wall – engineer
