= Whisper Not (song) =

1956 composition by Benny Golson

Song
- Language: English
- Written: 1956
- Composer: Benny Golson
- Lyricist: Leonard Feather

"Whisper Not" is a composition by Benny Golson. It is in a minor key and contains a shout chorus (a special chorus between the final solo and the closing head). Golson gave an account of writing the piece in which he said: "I wrote it in Boston at George Wein's Storyville club when I was with Dizzy Gillespie's big band. I wrote that tune in 20 minutes." Some sources indicate that the first recording was by Gillespie, while others indicate that trumpeter Lee Morgan was first.

It quickly became popular with other musicians: Thad Jones and Morgan recorded their own versions before its composer had the chance to record it with his own group. Golson's early version was on his 1957 album Benny Golson's New York Scene. By 1960, John S. Wilson, critic at The New York Times, had labelled the song, together with another Golson composition, "I Remember Clifford", "an established part of the jazz repertory". It has been recorded by hundreds of musicians, becoming a jazz standard. Leonard Feather added lyrics, which were recorded by Anita O'Day in 1962 and later by several other prominent vocalists.

Half a century after its composition, Golson remained strongly associated with the tune, and named one of his tours – the "Whisper Not Tour" – after it.

== See also ==
- List of post-1950 jazz standards
