= Blues March =

Jazz composition by Benny Golson

Song by Blue Mitchell

from the album Big 6
- Recorded: July 2 and 3, 1958
- Genre: Jazz
- Label: Riverside
- Composer: Benny Golson
- Producer: Orrin Keepnews

"Blues March" is a composition by Benny Golson. It was first recorded for Blue Mitchell's Riverside album Big 6 on July 2 and 3, 1958, and has become a jazz standard.

== Composition and recording ==
The composition is in 4/4 time. It was influenced by New Orleans marching bands, and "starts in long meter form and transforms back into regular time." Its straightforward harmony and separate sections make it ideal for improvisation. In the view of Leonard Feather, "the theme, with its slight bugle-call orientation, has a period quality that ties the work together".

Although some sources state that its first recorded version is the well known one by Art Blakey's band on his album Moanin' (recorded on October 30, 1958), the first version was on trumpeter Blue Mitchell's Big 6, which was recorded on July 2 and 3, 1958. This album was also Mitchell's first as leader.

== Influence ==
"Blues March" is commonly played by military and other marching bands.
