= Arkadia Records =

- Founded: 1996
- Founder: Bob Karcy
- Genre: Jazz, world music
- Country of origin: United States
- Location: New York City
- Official website: arkadiarecords.com

Arkadia Records is an independent record label that was founded in 1996.

The label was founded in New York City by Bob Karcy, who had been a manager for musicians and an independent record producer. The first release was Billy Taylor's Music Keeps Us Young, in 1997. From the first releases, the session leaders were allowed to select the other musicians and the material. Writers of early liner notes included Stanley Crouch, Ira Gitler, and Nat Hentoff. Arkadia acquired the catalog of Postcards Records in 1999.

The original label was Arkadia Jazz, on which 20 albums had been released by early 2000. The sub-label Arkadia Chansons is used for licensed re-releases of French recordings by performers such as Josephine Baker and Edith Piaf. By 2022, Arkadia had released more than 100 albums. This included sessions led by Joanne Brackeen, Benny Golson, Dave Liebman, and T. K. Blue.

Several releases have been by the Arkadia Jazz Allstars. These led to three Grammy Award nominations for Best Jazz Instrumental Solo: for Liebman on Thank You, John! Our Tribute to John Coltrane; for Golson on The Stars of Jazz, Vol.1; and for Randy Brecker on Thank You, Gerry!

In 2022, the label announced plans to make all of its recordings available for streaming, the establishment of Arkadia Concerts as a video-on-demand channel, and its first releases of new material for several years. Around 2024, they began reissuing albums on 180-gram vinyl.
