= Benny Golson =

American jazz saxophonist and composer (1929–2024)

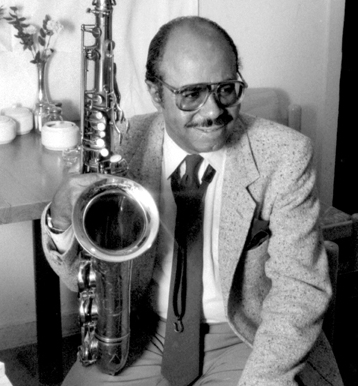
- Golson in 1985

Background information
- Born: January 25, 1929; Philadelphia, Pennsylvania, U.S.
- Died: September 21, 2024 (aged 95) New York City, U.S.
- Genres: Jazz; bebop; hard bop
- Occupations: Musician; composer; arranger
- Instrument: Tenor saxophone
- Years active: 1949–2024
- Formerly of: The Jazztet
- Website: www.bennygolson.com

Benny Golson (January 25, 1929 – September 21, 2024) was an American bebop and hard bop jazz tenor saxophonist, composer, and arranger. He came to prominence with the big bands of Lionel Hampton and Dizzy Gillespie, more as a writer than a performer, before launching his solo career. Golson was known for co-founding and co-leading The Jazztet with trumpeter Art Farmer in 1959. From the late 1960s through the 1970s Golson was in demand as an arranger for film and television and thus was less active as a performer, but he and Farmer re-formed the Jazztet in 1982.

Many of Golson's compositions have become jazz standards, including "I Remember Clifford", "Blues March", "Stablemates", "Whisper Not", "Along Came Betty", and "Killer Joe". He is regarded as "one of the most significant contributors" to the development of hard bop jazz, and was a recipient of a Grammy Trustees Award in 2021.

== Early life and education ==
He was born Benny Golson in Philadelphia, Pennsylvania, on January 25, 1929. His father, also Bennie Golson, left the family early. His mother Celadia brought the family up, working as a seamstress and a waitress. Golson witnessed racism first at age eight on a trip to Georgia with an uncle. He began taking piano lessons at age nine; his interest in music was nurtured at Benjamin Franklin High School in Philadelphia giving him ambitions to become a concert pianist; he was fascinated by the music of Brahms and Chopin. At age 13, he was taken to New York's Minton Playhouse, where bebop was born, and he experienced some bop pioneers including Thelonious Monk. He saw Lionel Hampton's band, featuring Arnett Cobb on tenor saxophone, at Philadelphia's Earle Theatre. Inspired, he switched to the saxophone at age 14. At the high school, he played with several other promising young musicians, including John Coltrane, Red Garland, Jimmy Heath, Percy Heath, Philly Joe Jones, and Red Rodney. He later attended Howard University.

== Career ==
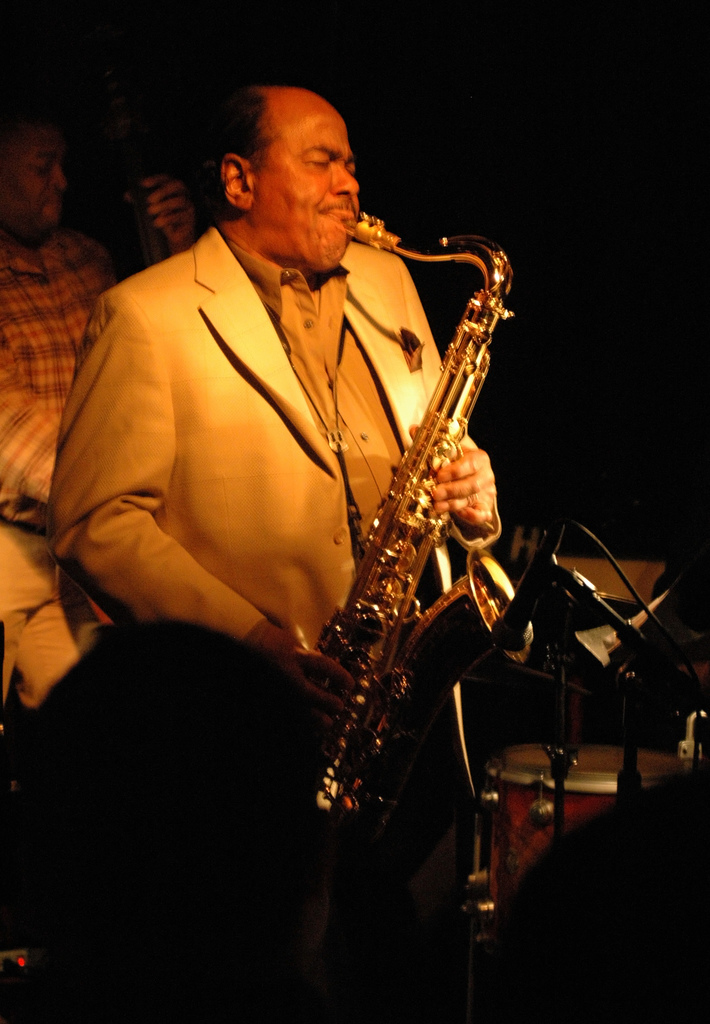
Golson in New York City in 2006

After graduating from Howard University, Golson joined Bull Moose Jackson's rhythm and blues band; Tadd Dameron, whom Golson came to consider the most important influence on his writing, was Jackson's pianist at the time.

From 1953 to 1959, Golson played with Dameron's band and then with the bands of Lionel Hampton, Johnny Hodges, Earl Bostic, Dizzy Gillespie, and Art Blakey and the Jazz Messengers, with whom he recorded the classic Moanin' in 1958.

Golson was working with the Lionel Hampton band at the Apollo Theater in Harlem in 1956 when he learned that Clifford Brown, a noted and well-liked jazz trumpeter who had done a stint with him in Dameron's band, had died in a car accident. Golson was so moved by the event that he composed the threnody "I Remember Clifford", as a tribute to a fellow musician and friend.

In addition to "I Remember Clifford", many of Golson's other compositions have become jazz standards. Songs such as "Stablemates", "Killer Joe", "Whisper Not", "Along Came Betty", and "Are You Real?", have been performed and recorded numerous times by many musicians.

From 1959 to 1962, Golson co-led the Jazztet with Art Farmer, mainly playing his own compositions. Golson then left jazz to concentrate on studio and orchestral work for 12 years. During this time, he composed music for such television shows as Mannix, Ironside, Room 222, M*A*S*H, The Partridge Family and Mission: Impossible. He also formulated and conducted arrangements to various recordings, such as Eric Is Here, a 1967 album by Eric Burdon, which features five of Golson's arrangements, conducted by Golson.

During the mid-1970s, Golson returned to jazz playing and recording. Critic Scott Yanow of AllMusic wrote that Golson's sax style underwent a major shift with his performing comeback, more resembling avant-garde Archie Shepp than the swing-era Don Byas influence of Golson's youth. He made a successful second career playing in clubs and on festivals internationally. In 1982, Golson re-organized the Jazztet with Farmer.

Golson is central to the plot of the 2004 Steven Spielberg movie The Terminal, and makes a cameo appearance as himself. In the film, main character Viktor Navorski (Tom Hanks) has the autographs of everyone who appears in A Great Day in Harlem, a famous 1958 photo of prominent jazz musicians, except Golson's; he has traveled to the US from Europe to obtain this final signature. Pianist Ray Bryant's song "Something in B-Flat," which was included on Golson's debut album as a leader, Benny Golson's New York Scene, can be heard during a scene where Viktor is painting and redecorating part of an airport terminal; in a later scene, Golson's band performs "Killer Joe". The album Terminal 1 was released by Golson shortly after the film, as a "homage to Steven Spielberg".

== Musical style ==
Golson's early playing has been described as "characterised by a distinctively fibrous, slightly hoarse tone ... firmly within the mainstream-modern tradition exemplified by another of his heroes, the tenor player Don Byas." During the 1960s, however, he absorbed some of the techniques pioneered by his friend John Coltrane, whom he described as "an inextinguishable example of spiritual nobility." He is regarded as "one of the most significant contributors" to the development of hard bop jazz.

== Personal life ==
Golson was married to Seville Golson; they had three sons, Odis, Reggie and Robert, and the marriage ended in divorce. He married the ballet dancer Bobbie Hurd in 1959; they had a daughter, Brielle. In an interview with Awake! on October 8, 1980, Golson said that since the late 1960s he and his wife had become members of Jehovah's Witnesses.

Golson died, following a short illness, at his home in Manhattan, New York, on September 21, 2024, at the age of 95.

== Awards and honors ==
In 1996, Golson received the NEA Jazz Masters Award of the National Endowment for the Arts.

In 1999, Golson was awarded an honorary doctorate of music from Berklee College of Music.

In October 2007, Golson received the Mellon Living Legend Legacy Award, presented by the Mid Atlantic Arts Foundation at a ceremony at the Kennedy Center. Additionally, during the same month, he won the University of Pittsburgh International Academy of Jazz Outstanding Lifetime Achievement Award at the university's 37th Annual Jazz Concert in the Carnegie Music Hall.

In November 2009, Golson was inducted into the International Academy of Jazz Hall of Fame, during a performance at the University of Pittsburgh's annual jazz seminar and concert.

He received the Grammy Trustees Award in 2021.

The Howard University Jazz Studies program created a prestigious award in his honor called the "Benny Golson Jazz Master Award" in 1996. Many distinguished jazz artists have received this award.

== Notable compositions ==
- "Stablemates", 1955
- "Whisper Not", 1956
- "Are You Real?", 1958
- "I Remember Clifford", 1957
- "Blues March", 1958
- "Along Came Betty", 1958
- "Five Spot After Dark", 1959
- "Killer Joe", 1960

== Gallery ==
Benny Golson in Denmark (2007)

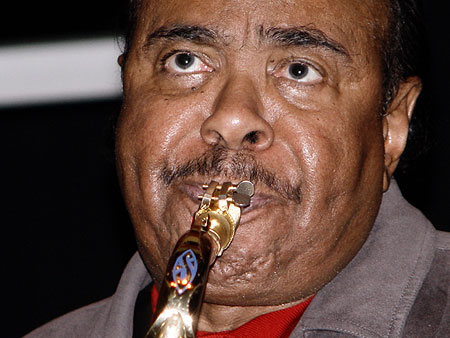

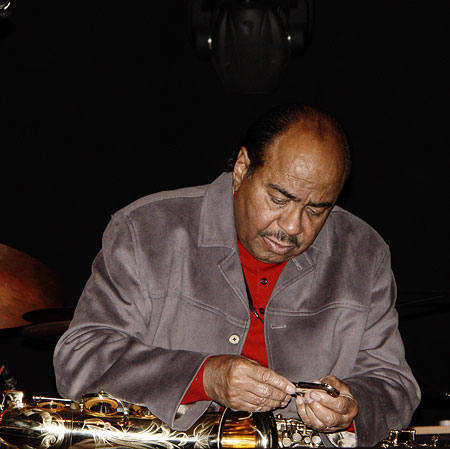

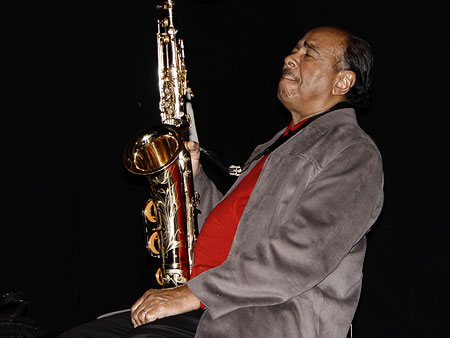

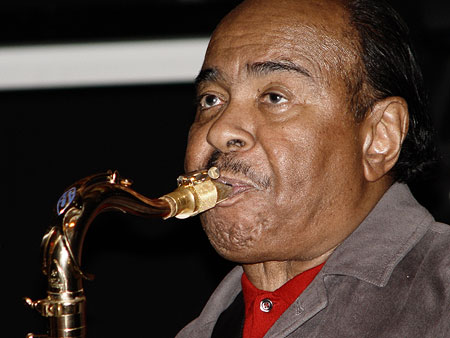

== Discography ==
Sources:

- The Modern Touch (Riverside 1958) – recorded in 1957
- The Other Side of Benny Golson (Riverside, 1958)
- Benny Golson and the Philadelphians (United Artists, 1958)
- Benny Golson's New York Scene (Contemporary, 1959) – recorded in 1957
- Gone with Golson (New Jazz, 1959)
- Groovin' with Golson (New Jazz, 1959)
- Winchester Special with Lem Winchester (New Jazz, 1959)
- Gettin' with It (New Jazz, 1960) – recorded in 1959
- Take a Number from 1 to 10 (Argo, 1961) – recorded in 1960–61
- Pop + Jazz = Swing (Audio Fidelity, 1962)
- Turning Point (Mercury, 1962)
- Free (Argo, 1963) – recorded in 1962
- The Roland Kirk Quartet Meets the Benny Golson Orchestra with Roland Kirk (Mercury, 1964)
- Stockholm Sojourn (Prestige, 1965) – recorded in 1964
- Tune In, Turn On (Verve, 1967)
- Killer Joe (Columbia, 1977)
- California Message with Curtis Fuller (Baystate, 1981)
- One More Mem'ry with Curtis Fuller (Baystate, 1982)
- Time Speaks with Freddie Hubbard and Woody Shaw (Baystate, 1983)
- This Is for You, John (Baystate, 1984) – recorded in 1983
- Stardust with Freddie Hubbard (Denon, 1987)
- Benny Golson Quartet Live (Dreyfus, 1991) – recorded in 1989
- Benny Golson Quartet (LRC Ltd. 1990)
- Domingo (Dreyfus, 1992) – recorded in 1991
- I Remember Miles (Alfa Jazz, 1993) – recorded in 1992
- That's Funky (Meldac Jazz, 1995) – recorded in 1994
- Up Jumped Benny (Arkadia Jazz, 1997) – recorded in 1996
- Tenor Legacy (Arkadia Jazz, 1998) – recorded in 1996
- Remembering Clifford (Milestone, 1998) – recorded in 1997
- One Day, Forever (Arkadia Jazz, 2001) – recorded in 1996–2000
- Terminal 1 (Concord, 2004)
- New Time, New 'Tet (Concord, 2009) – recorded in 2008
- Horizon Ahead (HighNote, 2016) – recorded in 2015
