= Mulgrew Miller discography =

Mulgrew Miller was an American jazz pianist. His appearances on record date from at least 1980 to 2012, the year before his death. They include more than 15 albums under his own name.

== Discography ==
These lists exclude compilations.

=== As leader/co-leader ===
Recording date	Title	Label	Year released	Notes
1985-06	Keys to the City	Landmark	1985	Trio, with Ira Coleman (bass), Marvin "Smitty" Smith (drums)
1986-04	Work!	Landmark	1986	Trio, with Charnett Moffett (bass), Terri Lyne Carrington (drums)
1987-05	Wingspan	Landmark	1987	Sextet, with Kenny Garrett (flute, alto sax), Steve Nelson (vibraphone), Charnett Moffett (bass), Tony Reedus (drums), Rudy Bird (percussion)
1987-12	Trio Transition	DIW	1987	As "Trio Transition" – with Reggie Workman (bass), and Frederick Waits (drums)
1988-06	Trio Transition with Special Guest Oliver Lake	Disk Union	1988	As "Trio Transition" – with Reggie Workman (bass), Frederick Waits (drums); and Oliver Lake (alto sax)
1988-08	The Countdown	Landmark	1989	Quartet, with Joe Henderson (tenor sax), Ron Carter (bass), Tony Williams (drums)
1990-03	From Day to Day	Landmark	1990	Trio, with Robert Hurst (bass), Kenny Washington (drums)
1991-08	Time and Again	Landmark	1991	Trio, with Peter Washington (bass), Tony Reedus (drums)
1992-12	Hand in Hand	Novus	1993	Quintet to septet, with Kenny Garrett (soprano sax, alto sax), Joe Henderson (tenor sax), Eddie Henderson (trumpet, flugelhorn), Steve Nelson (vibraphone), Christian McBride (bass), Lewis Nash (drums)
1993-12	With Our Own Eyes	Novus	1994	Trio, with Richie Goods (bass), Tony Reedus (drums)
1995-03	Getting to Know You	Novus	1995	Trio, with Richie Goods (bass), Karriem Riggins (drums); quintet with Big Black (conga), Steve Kroon (percussion) added on some tracks
1999-01	The Duets	Bang & Olufsen	1999	Duo, with Niels-Henning Ørsted Pedersen (bass)
2000-07	NHOP & Mulgrew Miller: The Duo – Live!	Storyville	2016	[2CD] Duo, with Niels-Henning Ørsted Pedersen (bass); in concert
2000-10	Solo	Space Time	2010	Solo; in concert
2002-06	The Sequel	Maxjazz	2002	Sextet, with Steve Wilson (soprano sax, alto sax), Duane Eubanks (trumpet), Steve Nelson (vibraphone), Richie Goods (bass), Karriem Riggins (drums)
2002-09	Live at the Kennedy Center Vol. 1	Maxjazz	2006	Trio, with Derrick Hodge (bass), Rodney Green (drums); in concert
2002-09	Live at the Kennedy Center: Vol. 2	Maxjazz	2007	Trio, with Derrick Hodge (bass), Rodney Green (drums); in concert
2003-07	Live at Yoshi's, Vol. 1	Maxjazz	2004	Trio, with Derrick Hodge (bass), Karriem Riggins (drums); in concert
2003-07	Live at Yoshi's, Vol. 2	Maxjazz	2005	Trio, with Derrick Hodge (bass), Karriem Riggins (drums); in concert
2004-02	Solo in Barcelona	Storyville	2023	Solo; in concert
2006-11, 2007-11	In Harmony	Resonance	2021	[2CD] Duo, co-led with Roy Hargrove (trumpet, flugelhorn); in concert
2005-03, 2011-05	Live: The Art of Piano Duo	Groovin' High	2019	[3CD] Duo, with Kenny Barron (piano); in concert
2012-02	Grew's Tune	Stunt	2012	With Klüvers Big Band; in concert

Main sources:

=== As sideman ===
An asterisk (*) indicates that it is year of release, not recording.

Year recorded	Leader	Title	Label
1993	Carl Allen	The Dark Side of Dewey	Evidence
2002	Karrin Allyson	In Blue	Concord
1990	Harold Ashby	What Am I Here For?	Criss Cross
1994	Gary Bartz	The Red and Orange Poems	Atlantic
1994–1995	Bob Belden	Shades of Blue	Blue Note
1989	Jerry Bergonzi	Lineage	Red
1984	Art Blakey	New York Scene	Concord
1985	Art Blakey	Blue Night	Timeless
1985	Art Blakey	Live at Kimball's	Concord
1985	Art Blakey	Live at Sweet Basil	Paddle Wheel
1985	Art Blakey	Live at Ronnie Scott's	TP Jazz
1985	Art Blakey	Dr. Jeckyle	Evidence
1985	Art Blakey	New Year's Eve at Sweet Basil	Paddle Wheel
1983	Terence Blanchard and Donald Harrison	New York Second Line	Concord
1984	Terence Blanchard and Donald Harrison	Discernment	Concord
1986	Terence Blanchard and Donald Harrison	Nascence	Columbia
1986	Hamiet Bluiett	Last Night	Just a Memory
1998	Cecil Bridgewater	Mean What You Say	Brownstone
1991–1992	Gary Burton	Six Pack	GRP
2000	Gary Burton	For Hamp, Red, Bags and Cal	Concord
1987	Donald Byrd	Harlem Blues	Landmark
2008*	Paul Carr	Musically Yours	PCJ
1992	Betty Carter	It's Not About the Melody	Verve
2002	Ron Carter	The Golden Striker	Blue Note
2007	Ron Carter	It's the Time	Somethin' Else
2011	Ron Carter	Great Big Band	Sunnyside
2010	Ron Carter	San Sebastian	In + Out
1998	Joe Chambers	Mirrors	Blue Note
1989	The Contemporary Piano Ensemble	Four Pianos for Phineas	Evidence
1993	The Contemporary Piano Ensemble	The Key Players	Sony
1993*	Larry Coryell	Fallen Angel	CTI
1990	Bill Cosby	My Appreciation	Verve
1988	Monte Croft	A Higher Fire	Columbia
1990	Monte Croft	Survival of the Spirit	Columbia
1992	Eddie Daniels and Gary Burton	Benny Rides Again	Contemporary
1991*	Jesse Davis	Horn of Passion	Concord
1997	Jesse Davis	First Insight	Concord
2005	The Dizzy Gillespie All-Star Big Band	Dizzy's Business	Telarc
1999	The Dizzy Gillespie Alumni All-Stars	Dizzy's World	Shanachie
1989*	The Duke Ellington Orchestra	Music Is My Mistress	Musicmasters
2000	John D'Earth	Restoration Comedy	Double T
1986	Bill Easley	Wind Inventions	Sunnyside
2001	Dave Ellis	State of Mind	Milestone
1989	Robin Eubanks and Steve Turre	Dedication	JMT
1997	Charles Fambrough	Upright Citizen	Nugroove
1984	William Fielder	Love Progression	Prescription
1991	Sonny Fortune	It Ain't What It Was	Konnex
1990	Tomas Franck	Tomas Franck in New York	Criss Cross
1984	Kenny Garrett	Introducing Kenny Garrett	Criss Cross
1988	Kenny Garrett	Garrett 5	Bellaphon
1990*	Kenny Garrett	African Exchange Student	Atlantic
1999*	Kenny Garrett	Simply Said	Warner Bros.
2006	Kenny Garrett	Beyond the Wall	Nonesuch
1987	Benny Golson	Stardust	Denon
1989	Benny Golson	Benny Golson Quartet Live	Dreyfus
1990	Benny Golson	Benny Golson Quartet	Lester Recording Catalog
1992	Benny Golson	I Remember Miles	Evidence
1999	Benny Golson	One Day, Forever	Arkadia Jazz
1994	Gabrielle Goodman	Until We Love	Winter & Winter
1983	Johnny Griffin	Call It Whachawana	Galaxy
1999	Mark Gross	Riddle of the Sphinx	J Curve
1997	Stefon Harris	A Cloud of Red Dust	Blue Note
1999*	Donald Harrison	Free to Be	Impulse!
2004	Donald Harrison	The Survivor	Nagel Heyer
1991*	Antonio Hart	For the First Time	Novus
1993*	Antonio Hart	For Cannonball and Woody	Novus
2010*	Louis Hayes	Lou's Idea	American Showplace Music
1990	Vincent Herring	Evidence	Landmark
1991–1992	Vincent Herring	Dawnbird	Landmark
2001	Vincent Herring	Simple Pleasure	High Note
1998	Emil Hess and Richard Livingston Huntley	The Great Bridge	Storyville
2007	Dave Holland	Pass It On	Dare2/Emarcy
1983	The Horizon Quintet	Gumbo	Amigo
1988	Freddie Hubbard and Art Blakey	Feel the Wind	Timeless
1985	Freddie Hubbard and Woody Shaw	Double Take	Blue Note
1987	Freddie Hubbard and Woody Shaw	The Eternal Triangle	Blue Note
1985	Bobby Hutcherson	Color Schemes	Landmark
1993	Bobby Hutcherson	Acoustic Masters II	Atlantic
2003*	Javier Colon	Javier	Capitol
1998	Rodney Jones	The Undiscovered Few	Blue Note
2003	Sean Jones	Eternal Journey	Mack Avenue
2005*	Sean Jones	Gemini	Mack Avenue
1998*	Joyce	Astronauta: Canções De Elis	Pau Brasil
2002	Geoff Keezer	Sublime: Honoring the Music of Hank Jones	Telarc
2000*	Trudy Kerr	Day Dream	Jazzizit
1993	Ryan Kisor	On the One	Columbia
2001*	David Klein	My Marilyn	Enja
2000	Harold Land	Promised Land	Audiophoric
1992	David Liebman	Setting the Standard	Red
1994*	Lincoln Center Jazz Orchestra	The Fire of the Fundamentals	Columbia
1993	Joe Lovano	Tenor Legacy	Blue Note
1995	Joe Lovano	Quartets: Live at the Village Vanguard	Blue Note
2006*	Pamela Luss	There's Something About You I Don't Know	Savant
2000	Brian Lynch	Tribute to the Trumpet Masters	Sharp Nine
2012	Joe Magnarelli	Live at Smalls	Smallslive
2001	Rick Margitza	Memento	Palmetto
2000	René Marie	How Can I Keep from Singing?	Maxjazz
2001	René Marie	Vertigo	Maxjazz
1983	Branford Marsalis	Scenes in the City	Columbia
2002	Delfeayo Marsalis	Minions Dominion	Troubadour Jass
2008	Delfeayo Marsalis	Sweet Thunder	Troubador
2004*	Harvey Mason	With All My Heart	BMG
2005*	Chris McNulty	Dance Delicisio	Elefant Dreams
1995	Charles McPherson	Come Play with Me	Arabesque
1997	Charles McPherson	Manhattan Nocturne	Arabesque
1996	Bill Mobley	Live at Small's Vol. 1	Space Time
1996	Bill Mobley	Live at Small's Vol. 2	Space Time
2007	Bill Mobley	Moodscape	Space Time
2006*	Antoinette Montague	Pretty Blues	CAP
2010*	Antoinette Montague	Behind the Smile	In The Groove
1995	James Moody	Moody's Party	Telarc
1996	James Moody	Young at Heart	Warner Bros.
1988	Ralph Moore	Rejuvenate!	Criss Cross
1988	Frank Morgan	Yardbird Suite	Contemporary
1989	Frank Morgan	Reflections	Contemporary
1995*	Ronald Muldrow	Diaspora	Enja
1998	Ronald Muldrow	Freedom's Serenade	Double-Time
1989	Lewis Nash	Rhythm Is My Business	Evidence
2006	Lewis Nash	Jazz Museum: Tribute to Great Artists	All Art
1987–1989	Steve Nelson	Communications	Criss Cross
1999	Steve Nelson	New Beginnings	TCB
2007	Steve Nelson	Sound Effect	High Note
1990	Sam Newsome	Sam I Am	Criss Cross
1991*	New York Voices	Hearts of Fire	GRP
1995*	Greg Osby	Black Book	Blue Note
2011*	Charles Owens	Joy	Charles Owens
1996*	Dave Panichi	Blues for McCoy	Spirit Song
1994	Nicholas Payton	From This Moment	Verve
1997	Nicholas Payton and Lew Soloff, Tom Harrell, Eddie Henderson	Trumpet Legacy	Milestone
2005	Pierrick Pedron	Deep in a Dream	Nocturne
2003	Jeremy Pelt	Close to My Heart	Maxjazz
1989	P.J. Perry	My Ideal	Unity
1987	Billy Pierce	Give and Take	Sunnyside
1991	Billy Pierce	One for Chuck	Sunnyside
1988	Tony Reedus	The Far Side	Evidence
1988	Dianne Reeves	The Nearness of You	Blue Note
1997*	Dianne Reeves	That Day	Blue Note
1999*	Dianne Reeves	Bridges	Blue Note
2000	Dianne Reeves	The Calling	Blue Note
1985	Claudio Roditi	Claudio!	Uptown
1987	Wallace Roney	Verses	Muse
1988	Wallace Roney	Intuition	Muse
1989	Wallace Roney	The Standard Bearer	Muse
2001	Jim Rotondi	Destination Up!	Sharp Nine
1990	David Sanborn	Another Hand	Elektra
1994	David Sanborn	Pearls	Elektra
2000	Randy Sandke	Cliffhanger	Nagel-Heyer
1977	Woody Shaw	Woody Shaw Live Volume Three	High Note
1980–1981	Woody Shaw	Field Recordings of a Jazz Master	International Trumpet Guild
1981	Woody Shaw	United	Columbia
1981	Woody Shaw	Tokyo '81	Elemental
1982	Woody Shaw	Lotus Flower	Enja
1982	Woody Shaw	Master of the Art	Elektra/Musician
1982	Woody Shaw	Night Music	Elektra/Musician
1983	Woody Shaw	The Time Is Right	Red
1983	Woody Shaw	Live in Bremen 1983	Elemental
2008	Alex Sipiagin	Mirages	Criss Cross
1987	Marvin Smith	Keeper of the Drums	Concord
2009	Neal Smith	Live at Smalls	Smallslive
1990	Gary Smulyan	The Lure of Beauty	Criss Cross
1990	Jim Snidero	Storm Rising	Ken Music
1998	Lew Soloff	With a Song in My Heart	Milestone
1988	James Spaulding	Brilliant Corners	Muse
1988	James Spaulding	Gotstabe a Better Way!	Muse
2003	Terell Stafford	New Beginnings	Maxjazz
1991*	Dave Stryker	Guitar on Top	Strikezone
1984	John Stubblefield	Confessin'	Soul Note
1987	John Stubblefield	Countin' on the Blues	Enja
1988	Superblue	Superblue	Blue Note
1993	Steve Swallow	Real Book	XtraWatt
1991	John Swana	John Swana and Friends	Criss Cross
1997	Jubilant Sykes	Jubilant	CBS
1997	Gregory Tardy	Serendipity	Impulse!
1989	Toots Thielemans	Footprints	Emarcy
1991	Gary Thomas	The Kold Kage	Winter & Winter
2001	Jean Toussaint	Blue Black	Space Time
1987	Steve Turre	Viewpoint	Stash
1997	Steve Turre	Lotus Flower	Verve
2000	Steve Turre	TNT	Telarc
2004	Steve Turre	The Spirits Up Above	HighNote
2008*	Steve Turre	Rainbow People	High Note
1999*	Urban Jazz Network	Urban Dreams	Mankind
1996*	Myron Walden	Hypnosis	NYC
1998	Bennie Wallace	Someone to Watch over Me	Enja
2001*	Bennie Wallace	Moodsville	Groovenote
1983	Bobby Watson	Jewel	Evidence
1983	Bobby Watson	Gumbo	Evidence
1987	Bobby Watson	The Year of the Rabbit	Evidence
1983	Bobby Watson and Curtis Lundy	Beatitudes	New Note
1993	Ernie Watts	Reaching Up	JVC
1999*	Ernie Watts	Classic Moods	JVC
2009*	Chip White	More Dedications	Dark Colors
1995*	Lenny White	Present Tense	Hip Bop
1999	Buster Williams	Live at the Montreux Jazz Festival, 1999	TCB
1985	Tony Williams	Foreign Intrigue	Blue Note
1986	Tony Williams	Civilization	Blue Note
1988	Tony Williams	Angel Street	Blue Note
1989	Tony Williams	Native Heart	Blue Note
1991	Tony Williams	The Story of Neptune	Blue Note
1992	Tony Williams	Tokyo Live	Blue Note
1996	Tony Williams	Young at Heart	Columbia
1988	Cassandra Wilson	Blue Skies	JMT
1991	Steve Wilson	New York Summit	Criss Cross
1998	Steve Wilson	Generations	Stretch
2005	Warren Wolf	Incredible Jazz Vibes	M&I
2009	Warren Wolf	Black Wolf	M&I
1996*	Dave Young	Two by Two, Vol. 2	Justin Time
1996*	Dave Young	Side by Side, Vol. 3	Justin Time

Main sources:
