= On the Trail =

Studio album by Jimmy Heath
- Released: 1964
- Recorded: Spring 1964; New York City
- Genre: Jazz
- Length: 37:09
- Label: Riverside; RLP 486

Jimmy Heath chronology
Swamp Seed (1963)	On the Trail (1964)	Jam Gems: Live at the Left Bank (1965)

On the Trail is the sixth album by saxophonist Jimmy Heath featuring performances recorded in 1964 originally released on the Riverside label.

== Reception ==
Professional ratings
Review scores
Source	Rating
Allmusic	4.5/5 stars
The Penguin Guide to Jazz Recordings	3/4 stars

Scott Yanow of Allmusic says, "Heath is in excellent form with a quintet... It's a good example of his playing talents".

== Track listing ==
All compositions by Jimmy Heath except as indicated

1. "On the Trail" (Ferde Grofé) - 5:04
2. "Cloak and Dagger" - 4:17
3. "Vanity" (Guy Wood, Jack Manus, Bernard Bierman) - 4:37
4. "All the Things You Are" (Jerome Kern, Oscar Hammerstein II) - 5:19
5. "Gingerbread Boy" - 5:29
6. "I Should Care" (Axel Stordahl, Paul Weston, Sammy Cahn) - 5:13
7. "Project S" - 8:01

== Personnel ==
- Jimmy Heath - tenor saxophone
- Kenny Burrell - guitar
- Wynton Kelly - piano
- Paul Chambers - bass
- Albert Heath - drums
