= Ira Coleman =

French-American jazz bassist (b. 1956)

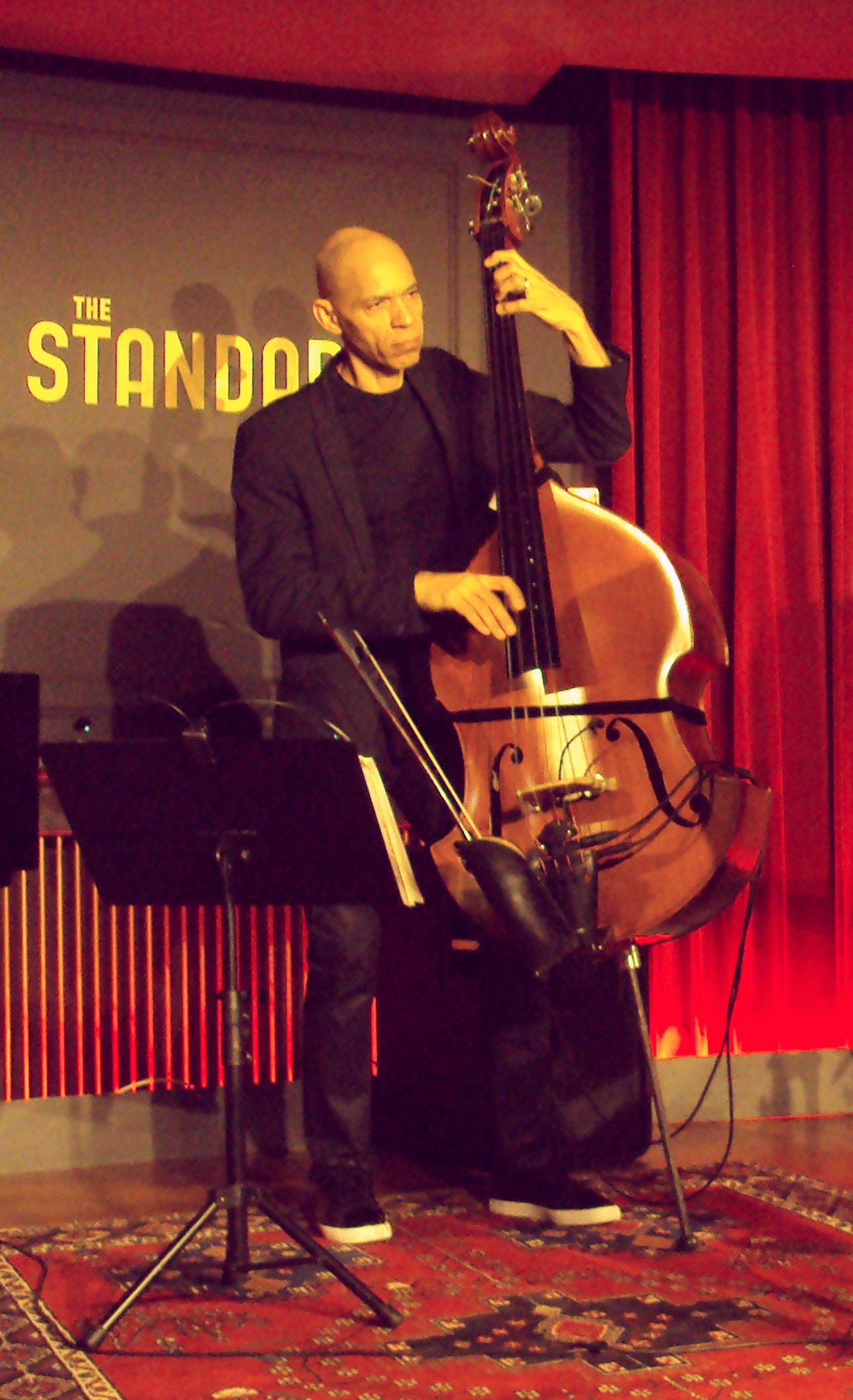

Background information
- Born: 1956 (age 69–70); Stockholm, Sweden
- Genres: Jazz
- Occupation: Musician
- Instrument: Double bass
- Years active: 1985–present
- Website: iracoleman.com

Ira Coleman (born April 29, 1956) is a Swedish-American jazz bassist.

Educated at the Berklee College of Music, he appears on four albums by Paris-based pianist Laurent de Wilde and has worked with artists such as Dee Dee Bridgewater, Milt Jackson, Ulf Wakenius, John Esposito, Joanne Brackeen, Herbie Hancock, Sting, Tony Williams, Ayọ and Antonio Farao.

== Discography ==
- 1985 Mulgrew Miller, Keys to the City (Landmark)
- 1990 Carl Allen And Manhattan Projects, Dreamboat (Timeless) – rec. 1989
- 1991 Vincent Herring, Evidence (Landmark)
- 1991 Vincent Herring, Dawnbird (Landmark)
- 1992 Franco Ambrosetti, Live at the Blue Note (Enja) – live
- 1993 Vincent Herring, Secret Love (MusicMasters)
- 1993 Tony Williams, Tokyo Live (Blue Note)[2CD] – live rec. 1992
- 1993 Carl Allen and Manhattan Projects, Piccadilly Square (Timeless)
- 1994 Vincent Herring, Folklore: Live at the Village Vanguard (MusicMasters) – live rec. 1993
- 1994 Barney Wilen, Le Ça : New York Romance (Venus)
- 1994 Jonny King, In from the Cold (Criss Cross Jazz)
- 1994 Joanne Brackeen, Power Talk (Turnipseed)
- 1995 Monty Alexander, Steamin' (Concord) – rec. 1994
- 1996 Ernest Ranglin, Below the Bassline (Island Jamaica Jazz)
- 1996 Tony Williams, Young at Heart (Sony)
- 1997 Georges Arvanitas, Rencontre (Sony)
- 1998 Herbie Hancock, Gershwin's World (Verve)
- 1998 Antonio Faraò, Jeff Tain Watts, Black Inside (Enja)
- 1998 Joe Chambers, Mirrors (Blue Note)
- 2000 Mamadou Diabate, Tunga (Alula)
- 2002 Dee Dee Bridgewater, This Is New (Verve)
- 2002 Grady Tate, Sings All Love (Eighty-Eight's)
- 2002 Philip Bailey, Soul on Jazz (Heads Up International)
- 2003 Pharoah Sanders, The Creator Has a Master Plan (Venus)
- 2005 Dee Dee Bridgewater, J'ai deux amours (DDB)
- 2010 Sting, Symphonicities (Deutsche Grammophon)
- 2010 Sting and the Royal Philharmonic Concert Orchestra, Live in Berlin (Deutsche Grammophon)[DVD-Video & CD] – live
- 2013 Antonio Faraò, Evan (P-Vine)
- 2016 Joe Chambers, Landscapes (Savant) – rec. 2015
- 2023 Joe Chambers, Dance Kobina (Blue Note) – rec. 2022
