= Vanity (1951 song) =

"Vanity" is a popular song.

The music was written by Guy Wood, the lyrics by Jack Manus and Bernard Bierman. The song was published in 1951. It had some success on the charts, reaching the top 20, in 1951 and was recorded by Don Cherry, who had recorded the hit version, for his 1968 album, There Goes My Everything.

The original 1951 recording by Don Cherry was released by Decca Records as catalog number 27618. It first reached the Billboard Best Seller chart on July 20, 1951, and lasted 11 weeks on the chart, peaking at number 17.

Jazz tenor saxophonist Jimmy Heath recorded an instrumental version for his 1964 album On the Trail.
