= The Time and the Place (Jimmy Heath album) =

Studio album by Jimmy Heath
- Released: 1994
- Recorded: June 24, 1974
- Studio: RCA Studios, NYC
- Genre: Jazz
- Length: 44:51
- Label: Landmark; LCD-1538-2
- Producer: Don Schlitten

Jimmy Heath chronology
Love and Understanding (1973)	The Time and the Place (1994)	Picture of Heath (1975)

The Time and the Place is an album by saxophonist Jimmy Heath featuring performances recorded in 1974 but not released until 1994 on the Landmark label.

== Reception ==
Professional ratings
Review scores
Source	Rating
Allmusic	3/5 stars

Scott Yanow at Allmusic noted "Jimmy Heath, who is heard here on tenor, alto, soprano and flute, played at his prime throughout the 1970's although he tended to be somewhat overlooked in popularity polls. Heath was stretching himself during the era as can be heard on these obscure pieces".

== Track listing ==
All compositions by Jimmy Heath except as indicated

1. "The Time and the Place" – 9:34
2. "The Voice of the Saxophone" – 6:11
3. "No End" (Kenny Dorham) – 7:06
4. "The 13th House" – 9:04
5. "Fau-Lu" – 8:07
6. "Studio Style" – 4:49

== Personnel ==
- Jimmy Heath – tenor saxophone, alto saxophone, soprano saxophone, flute, vocals
- Curtis Fuller – trombone, vocals
- Pat Martino – guitar
- Stanley Cowell – piano, mbira
- Sam Jones – bass
- Billy Higgins – drums
- Mtume – congas, percussion
