= Mellifluous =

Studio album by Mel Lewis Quintet
- Released: 1981
- Recorded: March 31, 1981
- Studios: Van Gelder Studio, Englewood Cliffs, NJ
- Genre: Jazz
- Length: 50:49 CD reissue with additional track
- Labels: Landmark; LCD-1543
- Producer: David Feinman

Mel Lewis chronology
| Live In Montreux (1980) | Mellifluous (1981) | Make Me Smile & Other New Works by Bob Brookmeyer (1982) |

Landmark CD Cover

Mellifluous is an album composed by drummer Mel Lewis recorded in 1981 and originally released on the Gatemouth label before being reissued on Landmark Records in 1995 (mistitled Mellifuous) with an additional track.

== Reception ==
Professional ratings
Review scores
| Source | Rating |
|---|---|
| Allmusic | 4/5 stars |

Allmusic reviewer Ken Dryden stated "This quintet led by drummer Mel Lewis was actually part of his larger orchestra, so they were high gear by the time of this 1981 recording session".

== Track listing ==
All compositions by Jim McNeely except where noted

1. "Blue Note" – 8:02
2. "Giving Way" – 4:29
3. "Audrey" (Bud Powell) – 7:30
4. "I'm Old Fashioned" (Jerome Kern, Johnny Mercer) – 7:22
5. "Warm Valley" (Duke Ellington) – 7:45
6. "John's Abbey" (Powell) – 5:21
7. "Blue Note" [Alternate take] – 10:20 Additional track on CD reissue

== Personnel ==
- Mel Lewis – drums
- John Mosca – trombone
- Dick Oatts – alto saxophone, soprano saxophone, alto flute
- Jim McNeely – piano
- Marc Johnson – bass
