= You've Changed (album) =

Studio album by Jimmy Heath
- Released: 1992
- Recorded: August 1991; Copenhagen, Denmark
- Genre: Jazz
- Length: 62:37
- Label: SteepleChase; SCCD 31292
- Producer: Nils Winther

Jimmy Heath chronology
Peer Pleasure (1987)	You've Changed (1992)	Little Man Big Band (1992)

You've Changed is a 1992 album by saxophonist Jimmy Heath featuring performances that were recorded in Denmark in 1991 and released through the SteepleChase label in 1992.

== Reception ==
Professional ratings
Review scores
Source	Rating
AllMusic	3.5/5 stars
The Penguin Guide to Jazz Recordings	3/4 stars

David Dupont at AllMusic stated "You've Changed presents journeyman saxophonist Jimmy Heath in an unadorned setting that exhibits his talents in full splendor."

== Track listing ==
All compositions by Jimmy Heath, unless otherwise indicated

1. "Soul Eyes" (Mal Waldron) – 8:13
2. "Sleeves" – 9:21
3. "Bluesville" (Sonny Red) – 7:14
4. "You've Changed" (Victor Young) – 8:19
5. "Basic Birks" – 7:29
6. "Last Night When We Were Young" (Harold Arlen, E.Y. "Yip" Harburg) – 7:12
7. "Sassy Samba" – 6:36
8. "Prince Albert" (Kenny Dorham) – 8:10

== Personnel ==
- Jimmy Heath – tenor saxophone, soprano saxophone
- Tony Purrone – guitar
- Ben Brown – bass
- Albert "Tootie" Heath – drums
