= The Countdown =

Studio album by Mulgrew Miller
- Released: 1989
- Recorded: August 15–16, 1988
- Studio: Fantasy Studios, Berkeley, CA.
- Genre: Jazz
- Length: 49:54
- Label: Landmark Records LLP-1519
- Producer: Orrin Keepnews

Mulgrew Miller chronology
Trio Transition (1987)	The Countdown (1989)	Trio Transition with Special Guest Oliver Lake (1988)

The Countdown is the fifth studio album by American jazz pianist Mulgrew Miller. The album was released in 1988 by Landmark Records. For this record Miller teamed with Ron Carter on bass, Joe Henderson on tenor sax, and Tony Williams on drums. Initially, the album contained seven compositions, but later it was re-released with the bonus track "1684".

== Reception ==
Professional ratings
Review scores
Source	Rating
Allmusic	4/5 stars

Scott Yanow of Allmusic noted that the album "is a particularly strong all-star date, teaming the pianist with tenor saxophonist Joe Henderson (who sits out on two of the seven numbers), bassist Ron Carter and drummer Tony Williams. Other than a surprisingly effective 'What the World Needs Now Is Love', the repertoire is composed of originals by Miller (four) and one apiece from Williams and Henderson ('Tetragon'). A high-quality advanced hard bop set."

== Track listing ==
No.	Title	Writer(s)	Length
1.	"The Countdown"	Miller	8:16
2.	"Exact Change"	Miller	5:19
3.	"What the World Needs Now Is Love"	Burt Bacharach, Hal David	7:27
4.	"1684"	Ron Carter	5:51
5.	"Tetragon"	Joe Henderson	6:42
6.	"Crystal Palace"	Tony Williams	5:39
7.	"Ambrosia"	Miller	4:42
8.	"August Afternoon"	Miller	5:58
Total length:			49:54

== Personnel ==
Musicians

- Ron Carter – bass
- Joe Henderson – tenor sax
- Mulgrew Miller – piano
- Tony Williams – drums

Production

- Phil Bray – photography
- Phil Carroll – art direction
- George Horn – mastering
- Orrin Keepnews – liner notes, producer
- Danny Kopelson – engineering, remixing
