= Invitation (Milt Jackson album) =

Studio album by Milt Jackson Sextet
- Released: 1963
- Recorded: August 30, October 31 and November 7, 1962
- Genre: Jazz
- Length: 40:53
- Label: Riverside
- Producer: Orrin Keepnews

Milt Jackson chronology
Big Bags (1962)	Invitation (1963)	Vibrations (1964)

Invitation is an album by vibraphonist Milt Jackson's Sextet featuring performances recorded in 1962 and released on the Riverside label.

== Reception ==
The Allmusic review by Scott Yanow awarded the album 3½ stars stating it has "enough variety to hold one's interest throughout. It's not essential but Milt Jackson fans will enjoy this music".

Professional ratings
Review scores
Source	Rating
Allmusic	3.5/5 stars
The Penguin Guide to Jazz Recordings	2.5/4 stars

== Track listing ==
All compositions by Milt Jackson except as indicated

1. "Invitation" (Bronislaw Kaper, Paul Francis Webster) - 3:55
2. "Too Close for Comfort" (Jerry Bock, Larry Holofcener, George David Weiss) - 5:15
3. "Ruby, My Dear" [Take 6] (Thelonious Monk) - 4:27
4. "Ruby, My Dear" [Take 5] (Monk) - 4:15 Bonus track on CD reissue
5. "The Sealer" - 6:32
6. "Poom-A-Loom" - 6:56
7. "Stella by Starlight" (Ned Washington, Victor Young) - 4:00
8. "Ruby" (Monk) - 5:53
9. "None Shall Wander" [Take 8] (Kenny Dorham) - 3:55
10. "None Shall Wander" [Take 6] (Dorham) - 3:56 Bonus track on CD reissue

- Recorded in New York City on June 19 & 20 and July 5, 1962

== Personnel ==
- Milt Jackson – vibes
- Kenny Dorham, Virgil Jones (tracks 2 & 6) – trumpet
- Jimmy Heath – tenor saxophone (tracks 1, 3–5 & 7–10)
- Tommy Flanagan – piano
- Ron Carter – bass
- Connie Kay – drums
