= From Day to Day =

Studio album by Mulgrew Miller
- Released: 1990
- Recorded: March 14–15, 1990
- Studios: BMG Studios, NYC
- Genre: Jazz
- Length: 48:49
- Label: Landmark Records LLP-1525
- Producer: Orrin Keepnews

Mulgrew Miller chronology
| Trio Transition with Special Guest Oliver Lake (1988) | From Day to Day (1990) | Time and Again (1991) |

From Day to Day is a 1990 studio album by American jazz pianist Mulgrew Miller recorded together with drummer Kenny Washington and bassist Robert Hurst. This is his seventh album as a leader.

== Reception ==
Professional ratings
Review scores
| Source | Rating |
|---|---|
| Allmusic | 4/5 stars |

Jack Fuller of Chicago Tribune noted "The piano jazz of Mulgrew Miller is altogether serviceable. He is quick with the unusual scale, graceful on the ballads. Here with only a bass and drums behind him, he has a chance to show his skill. The trouble, at least for me, is that I can`t hear his voice. He is still generic, which is a shame, because he just may have something to say".

== Track listing ==
| No. | Title | Length |
|---|---|---|
| 1. | "La Chambre" | 7:35 |
| 2. | "What a Diff'rence a Day Made" | 8:08 |
| 3. | "Four" | 7:53 |
| 4. | "From Day to Day" | 7:26 |
| 5. | "Playthang" | 7:01 |
| 6. | "Farewell to Dogma" | 5:56 |
| 7. | "One Notch Up" | 4:50 |
| 8. | "More Than You Know" |
| Total length: | | 48:49 |

== Personnel ==
Band

- Robert Hurst – bass
- Mulgrew Miller – piano
- Kenny Washington – drums

Production

- Paul Goodman – engineer
- Orrin Keepnews – producer
