= Dawnbird =

1993 jazz album by Vincent Herring

Studio album by Vincent Herring
- Released: 1993
- Recorded: October 31, 1991, November 1, 1991 and February 7, 1992
- Studio: BMG Studio B, NYC
- Genre: Jazz
- Length: 58:04
- Label: Landmark; LCD 1533
- Producer: Orrin Keepnews

Vincent Herring chronology
| Evidence (1991) | Dawnbird (1993) | Folklore: Live at the Village Vanguard (1994) |

Dawnbird is an album by saxophonist Vincent Herring which was released on Orrin Keepnews' Landmark label in 1993.

== Reception ==
Professional ratings
Review scores
| Source | Rating |
|---|---|
| AllMusic | 4.5/5 stars |

The AllMusic review by Ron Wynn stated "Alto saxophonist Vince Herring has steadily developed his own tart, bluesy sound ... There is more spark, ambition and drive in his playing on this release than any previous date; he tries new things on each number and isn't afraid to stretch out ... by far his best release".

== Track listing ==
All compositions by Vincent Herring except where noted

1. "Sound Check" – 8:15
2. "August Afternoon" (Mulgrew Miller) – 6:33
3. "Almost Always" – 8:53
4. "Toku Do" (Buster Williams) – 6:40
5. "Dawnbird" (Mike Nock) – 6:15
6. "Dr. Jamie" – 5:20
7. "Who's Kidding Who?" – 9:08
8. "Dark Side of Dewey" (Carl Allen) – 7:00

== Personnel ==
- Vincent Herring - alto saxophone, soprano saxophone
- Wallace Roney (tracks 1–5), Scott Wendholt (tracks 6–8) – trumpet
- Kevin Hays (tracks 6–8), Mulgrew Miller (tracks 1–5) – piano
- Dwayne Burno (tracks 6–8), Ira Coleman (tracks 1–5) – bass
- Carl Allen (tracks 6–8), Billy Drummond (tracks 1–5) – drums
