= In a New Setting =

Studio album by Milt Jackson
- Released: 1965
- Recorded: December 9, 14 & 28, 1964
- Genre: Jazz
- Length: 36:51
- Label: Limelight
- Producer: Luchi De Jesus

Milt Jackson chronology
I/We Had a Ball (1965)	In a New Setting (1965)	Ray Brown / Milt Jackson (1965)

In a New Setting is an album by vibraphonist Milt Jackson featuring McCoy Tyner recorded in 1964 and released on the Limelight label.

== Reception ==
The Allmusic review by Ken Dryden awarded the album 4 stars stating "The leader's percussive but swinging style, plus the potent solos by Tyner and Heath, are all appealing".

Professional ratings
Review scores
Source	Rating
Allmusic	4/5 stars

== Track listing ==
All compositions by Milt Jackson except as indicated

1. "Sonny's Blues" - 3:38
2. "I'm Gonna Laugh You Right Out of My Life" (Cy Coleman, Joseph McCarthy) - 3:33
3. "Spanish Fly" (McCoy Tyner) - 3:17
4. "No Moon at All" (Redd Evans, David Mann) - 3:25
5. "Slow Death" - 4:51
6. "Clay's Blues" - 2:48
7. "Lazy Melody" - 2:46
8. "Project S" (Jimmy Heath) - 4:12
9. "Ev'ry Time We Say Goodbye" (Cole Porter) - 2:41
10. "That's In" - 3:00
11. "Ineffable" (Heath) - 2:33
12. "The Other Half of Me" (Stan Freeman, Jack Lawrence) - 3:07 Bonus track on CD reissue

- Recorded in New York City on December 9, 1964 (tracks 9 & 12), December 14, 1964 (tracks 6, 7 & 10) and December 28, 1964 (tracks 1–5, 8 & 11)

== Personnel ==
- Milt Jackson – vibes
- Jimmy Heath – flute, tenor saxophone
- McCoy Tyner – piano
- Bob Cranshaw – bass
- Connie Kay – drums
