= Swamp Seed =

Studio album by Jimmy Heath
- Released: 1963
- Recorded: March 11 & May 28, 1963; New York City
- Genre: Jazz
- Length: 36:50
- Label: Riverside; RLP 465

Jimmy Heath chronology
Triple Threat (1962)	Swamp Seed (1963)	On the Trail (1964)

Swamp Seed is the fifth album by the saxophonist Jimmy Heath of performances recorded in 1963, originally released on the Riverside label.

== Reception ==
Professional ratings
Review scores
Source	Rating
Down Beat	4.5/5 stars
AllMusic	3/5 stars
The Rolling Stone Jazz Record Guide	3/5 stars
The Penguin Guide to Jazz Recordings	3.5/4 stars

Scott Yanow of AllMusic wrote, "This is a delightful if underrated set... The music is straight-ahead but contains some unpredictable moments."

== Track listing ==
All compositions by Jimmy Heath except as indicated

1. "Six Steps" - 4:49
2. "Nutty" (Thelonious Monk) - 4:05
3. "More Than You Know" (Edward Eliscu, Billy Rose) Vincent Youmans) - 5:09
4. "Swamp Seed" (Percy Heath) - 5:19
5. "D Waltz" - 6:33
6. "Just in Time" (Betty Comden, Adolph Green, Jule Styne) - 5:28
7. "Wall to Wall" - 5:27

== Personnel ==
- Jimmy Heath - tenor saxophone
- Donald Byrd - trumpet
- Jim Buffington, Julius Watkins - French horn
- Don Butterfield - tuba
- Herbie Hancock (tracks 3 & 5–7), Harold Mabern (tracks 1, 2 & 4) - piano
- Percy Heath - double bass
- Connie Kay (tracks 3 & 5–7), Albert Heath (tracks 1, 2 & 4) - drums
