= Peer Pleasure =

Studio album by Jimmy Heath
- Released: 1987
- Recorded: February 17 & 18, 1987
- Studio: Van Gelder Studio, Englewood Cliffs, NJ
- Genre: Jazz
- Length: 47:32
- Label: Landmark; LLP-1514
- Producer: Orrin Keepnews

Jimmy Heath chronology
New Picture (1985)	Peer Pleasure (1987)	You've Changed (1991)

Peer Pleasure is an album by saxophonist Jimmy Heath featuring performances recorded in 1987 and released on the Landmark label.

== Reception ==
Professional ratings
Review scores
Source	Rating
Allmusic	4.5/5 stars

Scott Yanow at Allmusic noted "Jimmy Heath (60 at the time) shows that he was still very much in prime form".

== Track listing ==
All compositions by Jimmy Heath except where noted

1. "Trane Connections" - 7:22
2. "Song for Ben Webster" (Ernie Wilkins) - 6:13
3. "You Can See" (Monty Alexander) - 6:57
4. "Is That So?" (Duke Pearson) - 5:58
5. "Ellington's Stray Horn" - 6:26
6. "Forever Sonny" - 7:58
7. "I Waited for You" (Dizzy Gillespie) - 6:38

== Personnel ==
- Jimmy Heath - tenor saxophone, alto saxophone, soprano saxophone
- Tom Williams - trumpet, flugelhorn
- Tony Purrone - guitar
- Larry Willis - piano
- Stafford James - bass
- Akira Tana - drums
