= Color Schemes =

Studio album by Bobby Hutcherson
- Released: 1986
- Recorded: October 8–10, 1985
- Studio: Fantasy Studios, Berkeley CA
- Genre: Jazz
- Length: 43:21
- Label: Landmark; LLP/LCD 1508
- Producer: Orrin Keepnews

Bobby Hutcherson chronology
Good Bait (1985)	Color Schemes (1986)	In the Vanguard (1987)

Color Schemes is an album by vibraphonist Bobby Hutcherson featuring performances recorded in 1985 and released the following year on Orrin Keepnews' Landmark label.

== Reception ==
Professional ratings
Review scores
Source	Rating
AllMusic	4/5 stars

On AllMusic, Scott Yanow observed "On Color Schemes, Bobby Hutcherson (vibes) is backed by a top-notch rhythm section for a set of jazz standards and originals. Every selection has its worthwhile points ... This is an easily recommended album of high-quality, if conservative, music".

== Track listing ==
All compositions by Bobby Hutcherson except where noted.

1. "Recorda-Me" (Joe Henderson) – 5:52
2. "Bemsha Swing" (Thelonious Monk, Denzil Best) – 4:52
3. "Rosemary, Rosemary" – 5:09
4. "Second-Hand Brown" – 5:28
5. "Whisper Not" (Benny Golson) – 6:53
6. "Color Scheme" – 4:12
7. "Remember" (Irving Berlin) – 4:38
8. "Never Let Me Go" (Jay Livingston, Ray Evans) – 6:17

== Personnel ==
- Bobby Hutcherson – vibraphone, marimba
- Mulgrew Miller – piano
- John Heard – bass
- Billy Higgins – drums
- Airto – percussion (tracks 1, 4, 6 & 8)
