= In the Vanguard =

Live album by Bobby Hutcherson
- Released: 1987
- Recorded: December 5–6, 1986
- Venues: Village Vanguard, NYC
- Genre: Jazz
- Length: 55:27
- Labels: Landmark; LLP/LCD 1513
- Producer: Orrin Keepnews

Bobby Hutcherson chronology
Color Schemes (1986)	In the Vanguard (1987)	Farewell Keystone (1988)

In the Vanguard is a live album by vibraphonist Bobby Hutcherson featuring performances recorded in late 1986 at the Village Vanguard and released the following year on Orrin Keepnews' Landmark label.

== Reception ==
Professional ratings
Review scores
Source	Rating
Allmusic	3.5/5 stars

On Allmusic, Scott Yanow observed "Vibraphonist Bobby Hutcherson was once associated with the avant-garde to a certain extent but by the 1970s it was clear he had found his voice in the modern mainstream of jazz. ... the results are high-quality modern bebop. The communication between the players is quite impressive".

== Track listing ==
1. "Little Niles" (Randy Weston) – 6:44
2. "Estaté" (Bruno Martino, Bruno Brighetti) – 7:56
3. "Well, You Needn't" (Thelonious Monk) – 7:32
4. "Young and Foolish" (Albert Hague, Arnold B. Horwitt) – 10:23
5. "Someday My Prince Will Come" (Frank Churchill, Larry Morey) – 10:02
6. "Witchcraft" (Cy Coleman, Carolyn Leigh) – 7:44
7. "I Wanna Stand Over There" (Bobby Hutcherson) – 5:06

== Personnel ==
- Bobby Hutcherson – vibraphone, marimba
- Kenny Barron - piano
- Buster Williams – bass
- Al Foster – drums
