= Getting to Know You (album) =

Studio album by Mulgrew Miller
- Released: October 24, 1995
- Recorded: March 20–21, 1995
- Studio: Manhattan Center Studios, New York City
- Genre: Jazz
- Length: 60:51
- Label: Novus
- Producer: Steve Patterson, Tim Patterson

Mulgrew Miller chronology
With Our Own Eyes (1993)	Getting to Know You (1995)	The Duets (1999)

Professional ratings
Review scores
Source	Rating
Allmusic	4/5 stars

Getting to Know You is a studio album by American jazz pianist Mulgrew Miller. The album was released in 1995 by Novus Records. This is Miller's third record for Novus and eleventh overall.

== Background ==
The album is named after the popular song by Oscar Hammerstein II and Richard Rodgers, and consists of several standards and originals by Miller and Goods.

== Reception ==
Ken Dryden of Allmusic wrote "Mulgrew Miller is in top form for these 1995 sessions as he covers a wide range of compositions. With his regular trio on hand, including bassist Richie Goods and drummer Karriem Riggins, plus the addition of percussionist Steve Kroon and conga player Big Black, this marked the pianist's final recording for the Novus label. Miller's exotic "Eastern Joy Dance" and thoughtful "Second Thoughts" (which brings James Williams' writing style to mind) provide an excellent introduction. Standards include a breezy waltz treatment of "Getting to Know You" (from The King and I) and a driving rendition of "If I Should Lose You." The Beatles' "Fool on the Hill" takes flight in Miller's hands, as he adds a sprightly touch without sounding like a cocktail pianist."

== Track listing ==
No.	Title	Writer(s)	Length
1.	"Eastern Joy Dance"	Miller	6:39
2.	"Second Thoughts"	Miller	5:49
3.	"Sweet Sioux"	Freddie Hubbard	6:52
4.	"Getting to Know You"	Oscar Hammerstein II, Richard Rodgers	6:18
5.	"Whisper"	Miller	5:46
6.	"Didn't We"	Jimmy Webb	5:15
7.	"The Fool on the Hill"	John Lennon, Paul McCartney	6:45
8.	"I Don't Know How to Love Him"	Tim Rice, Andrew Lloyd Webber	5:10
9.	"If I Should Lose You"	Ralph Rainger, Leo Robin	6:53
10.	"Nandhi"	Richie Goods	5:36
Total length:			60:51

== Personnel ==
Band

- Mulgrew Miller – piano
- Big Black – congas (tracks: 1 2 4 7)
- Karriem Riggins – drums
- Richie Goods – bass
- Steve Kroon – percussion (tracks: 1 2 7 8)

Production

- Daniel Miller – photography
- Sean Mosher-Smith – art direction
- James Nichols – mastering, mixing
- Steve Patterson – producer
- Tim Patterson – producer
- Samuel Fromartz – liner notes
- Richard Clarke – mixing
