= New Picture =

Studio album by Jimmy Heath
- Released: 1985
- Recorded: June 18 & 20, 1985
- Studio: Van Gelder Studio, Englewood Cliffs, NJ
- Genre: Jazz
- Length: 44:51
- Label: Landmark; LLP-1506
- Producer: Jimmy Heath & Orrin Keepnews

Jimmy Heath chronology
Picture of Heath (1975)	New Picture (1985)	Peer Pleasure (1987)

New Picture is an album by saxophonist Jimmy Heath featuring performances recorded in 1985 and released on the Landmark label.

== Reception ==
Professional ratings
Review scores
Source	Rating
Allmusic	4/5 stars

Scott Yanow at Allmusic noted "Ten years after his most recent set as a leader, Jimmy Heath (heard here on tenor and soprano) finally had another opportunity to lead an album of his own... A tasteful and swinging effort".

== Track listing ==
All compositions by Jimmy Heath except as indicated

1. "New Picture" - 5:00
2. "Lush Life" (Billy Strayhorn) - 8:06
3. "Changes" - 5:59
4. "Keep Love Alive" - 5:21
5. "Dewey Square" (Charlie Parker) - 4:05
6. "Sophisticated Lady" (Duke Ellington, Irving Mills, Mitchell Parish) - 6:44
7. "Togetherness" - 5:10

== Personnel ==
- Jimmy Heath - tenor saxophone, soprano saxophone
- John Clark, Bobby Routch - French horn (tracks 2, 4 & 6)
- Benny Powell - trombone (tracks 2, 4 & 6)
- Howard Johnson - tuba (tracks 2, 4 & 6)
- Tony Purrone - guitar
- Tommy Flanagan - Rhodes piano (tracks 3 & 4)
- Rufus Reid - bass
- Al Foster - drums
