= Triple Threat (Jimmy Heath album) =

Studio album by Jimmy Heath
- Released: 1962
- Recorded: January 4 & 7, 1962; New York City
- Genre: Jazz
- Length: 37:09
- Label: Riverside; RLP 400

Jimmy Heath chronology
| The Quota (1961) | Triple Threat (1962) | Swamp Seed (1963) |

Triple Threat is the fourth album by saxophonist Jimmy Heath featuring performances recorded in 1962 originally released on the Riverside label.

== Recording ==
Triple Threat was a follow-up of Heath's 1961 album The Quota and used the same band. The Penguin Guide to Jazz Recordings considers the lineup, which features Heath's brothers Percy and Albert, a "dry-run" for their later Heath Brothers records. The album was recorded over two sessions in January 1962. Freddie Hubbard and Julius Watkins were not present for the second session when "The More I See You" was recorded.

The song "Gemini" was written for Heath's daughter, Roslyn, whose star sign it was.

The album title was an allusion to Heath's own status as a "triple threat": musician, arranger and composer. In the album liner notes, Ira Gitler described Heath in the following way:

The triple threat in football must pass, punt, and run on a high level. Musically, Jimmy Heath approximates this by his composing, arranging and playing, all of which are ably and amply demonstrated here.

== Release and reception ==
Professional ratings
Review scores
| Source | Rating |
|---|---|
| Allmusic | 4/5 stars |
| The Penguin Guide to Jazz Recordings | 3.5/4 stars |

Cannonball Adderley recorded his own version of "Gemini" only 10 days after Heath's recording. Shortly beforeTriple Threat was released in 1962, Adderley released a record featuring his version which somewhat overshadowed Heath's recording.

Scott Yanow of Allmusic says, "The arrangements of Heath uplift the straightahead music and make each selection seem a bit special". Billboard described the album as one of Heath's best sessions, praising his playing and the "directness, individuality and strength" of the compositions.

In his autobiography, Heath, a Philadelphian, recalls his pride that he was gaining recognition in his hometown upon reading a positive review of the album in the Philadelphia Daily News.

== Track listing ==
All compositions by Jimmy Heath except as indicated

1. "Gemini" - 6:09
2. "Bruh Slim" - 5:16
3. "Goodbye" (Gordon Jenkins) - 7:04
4. "Dew and Mud" - 5:01
5. "Make Someone Happy" (Jule Styne, Betty Comden, Adolph Green) - 3:41
6. "The More I See You" (Harry Warren, Mack Gordon) - 4:18
7. "Prospecting" - 5:40

== Personnel ==
- Jimmy Heath - tenor saxophone
- Freddie Hubbard - trumpet
- Julius Watkins - French horn
- Cedar Walton - piano
- Percy Heath - bass
- Albert Heath - drums
