= Bernard Bierman =

American composer (1908–2012)

Bernard Bierman (August 26, 1908 – November 5, 2012) was an American composer of popular songs.

== Biography ==
Bierman was born in New York City. He studied pre-law and law at NYU and Brooklyn Law School, passing the bar in 1930. He practiced law until 1942 when he joined the U.S. Army where he served until 1945.

After the war, he worked at the height of The Great American Songbook as a contracted songwriter for the music publisher Shapiro, Bernstein & Co. in NYC's Brill Building, in the historic Tin Pan Alley writing a multitude of songs performed by such artists as Sarah Vaughan, Frank Sinatra, Billy Eckstine, Harry James, Guy Lombardo, Sammy Kaye, Xavier Cugat and Jimmy Heath.

Some of his best known songs of this period are "Midnight Masquerade", recorded 11 different times by various artists, reaching No. 3 in the US on Hit parade music chart; "Vanity", recorded twice by jazz vocalist Sarah Vaughan, reaching No. 2 on Hit parade was also recorded by vocalist Hadda Brooks and saxophonist Jimmy Heath. Other hits were "My Cousin Louella" recorded by Frank Sinatra and "Forgiving You" recorded by Sammy Kaye Orchestra in 1947 and by Billy Eckstine for Decca Records in 1951.

He left his position as staff writer in 1952 due to the death of a relative to lead an existing family business as head of the Painting and Decorating Contractors of America. He returned to music in 1989 when a song he co-wrote with Jack Manus and Guy Wood recorded by Guy Lombardo with Xavier Cugat was featured in the theatrical release of the Woody Allen film Crimes and Misdemeanors. The tune was incorrectly licensed and miscredited resulting in mistaken violation of the songwriters' copyrights. Although it resulted in a winning settlement for the writers, the song was later replaced by another when the film was released on video.

== Selected works ==
Musicals

- The Love of Two Cabbages, An Operetta for Children Apollo Records, (1946)
- The Farmer Weds a Widow, A Musical Romance (1998)
- We Have Something to Say, A Musical Revue (1999)

Songs

- "Why?"
- "It Must Be You"
- "My Cousin Louella"
- "I Wouldn't Be Surprised"
- "Midnight Masquerade"
- "I Can't Sleep"
- "Don't Shout!"
- "Now and Then"
- "Forgiving You"
- "Where Were You"
- "I Can Tell"
- "Let Me Be The One"
- "Anything for a Laugh"
- "Lies"
- "Go Away"
- "Immigrant Song"
- "Confetti"
- "A Puppet on a String"
- "City Limits"

== Discography ==
- The Other Half of Me (1995)
- The Farmer Weds a Widow: A Musical Romance (1998 Studio Cast Recording)
- We Have Something to Say: A Musical Revue (1999)
- Somewhere in the World: Michelle Pirret (2002)
- Bernie's Journey (2005)
- Discoveries (2007)
