= Ray Brown / Milt Jackson =

Studio album by Ray Brown and Milt Jackson
- Released: 1965
- Recorded: January 4–5, 1965
- Genre: Jazz
- Length: 40:33
- Label: Verve
- Producer: Jim Davis

Ray Brown chronology
Much in Common (1964)	Ray Brown / Milt Jackson (1965)	Memphis Jackson (1970)

Milt Jackson chronology
In a New Setting (1965)	Ray Brown / Milt Jackson (1965)	The Modern Jazz Quartet Plays George Gershwin's Porgy and Bess (1965)

Ray Brown / Milt Jackson is an album by bassist Ray Brown and vibraphonist Milt Jackson recorded in 1965 and released on the Verve label.

== Reception ==
The Allmusic review awarded the album 4½ stars.

Professional ratings
Review scores
Source	Rating
Allmusic	4.5/5 stars

== Track listing ==
1. "Lined with a Groove" (Ray Brown) - 5:34
2. "For Someone I Love (What's Your Story)" (Milt Jackson) - 4:35
3. "Dew and Mud" (Jimmy Heath) - 4:19
4. "I Just Can't Fool Myself" (Brown) - 6:16
5. "Lazy Theme" (Oscar Peterson) - 4:53
6. "Now Hear My Meaning" (Jimmy Woods) - 5:16
7. "In a Crowd" (John Lewis) - 6:05
8. "Monterey Mist" (Jackson) - 3:35

- Recorded in New York City on January 4 & 5, 1965

== Personnel ==
- Milt Jackson – vibraphone
- Ray Brown – bass
- Ernie Royal, Clark Terry, Snooky Young – trumpet
- Jimmy Cleveland, Urbie Green, Tom McIntosh, Tony Studd – trombone
- Ray Alonge – French horn
- Bob Ashton, Danny Bank, Jimmy Heath, Romeo Penque, Jerome Richardson, Phil Woods – reeds
- Hank Jones – piano
- Grady Tate – drums
- Oliver Nelson tracks 1, 5, 6, 7, Jimmy Heath tracks 2, 3, 4, 8 – arranger, conductor
