= Picture of Heath =

Studio album by Jimmy Heath
- Released: 1975
- Recorded: September 22, 1975; New York City
- Genre: Jazz
- Length: 40:08
- Label: Xanadu; 118
- Producer: Don Schlitten

Jimmy Heath chronology
The Time and the Place (1974)	Picture of Heath (1975)	New Picture (1985)

Picture of Heath is an album by saxophonist Jimmy Heath featuring performances recorded in 1975 and originally released on the Xanadu label.

== Reception ==
Professional ratings
Review scores
Source	Rating
Allmusic	4.5/5 stars
The Rolling Stone Jazz Record Guide	3/5 stars

Scott Yanow of Allmusic states: "The great tenorman was clearly inspired by the stellar rhythm section resulting in one of his best blowing sessions".

== Track listing ==
All compositions by Jimmy Heath except as indicated

1. "For Minors Only" - 7:23
2. "Body and Soul" (Frank Eyton, Johnny Green, Edward Heyman, Robert Sour) - 7:24
3. "Picture of Heath" - 5:59
4. "Bruh Slim" - 8:58
5. "All Members" - 5:12
6. "C.T.A." - 5:12

== Personnel ==
- Jimmy Heath - tenor saxophone, soprano saxophone
- Barry Harris - piano
- Sam Jones - bass
- Billy Higgins - drums
