= Time and Again (Mulgrew Miller album) =

Studio album by Mulgrew Miller
- Released: 1991
- Recorded: August 19–21, 1991
- Studio: BMG Studios, NYC
- Genre: Jazz
- Label: Landmark Records LCD-1532-2
- Producer: Orrin Keepnews

Mulgrew Miller chronology
From Day to Day (1990)	Time and Again (1991)	Hand in Hand (1992)

Time and Again is a 1991 studio album by American jazz pianist Mulgrew Miller together with Peter Washington on bass and Tony Reedus on drums. This is his eighth album as a leader and sixth for Landmark Records label.

== Reception ==
Professional ratings
Review scores
Source	Rating
AllMusic	4/5 stars

Scott Yanow of AllMusic wrote "Miller's ... recording finds him returning to the trio format with bassist Peter Washington and drummer Tony Reedus. Six of the ten selections are his compositions (including 'Tongue Twister,' 'Woeful Blues,' 'My Minuet' and an unaccompanied solo rendition of 'Song of Today'), while the four remaining songs include the spiritual 'Lord, In the Morning Thou Shalt Hear' (taken solo) and Bud Powell's 'I'll Keep Loving You.' The reliable pianist is in typically fine form on this swinging and fairly exploratory set."

Billboard reviewers called the album "a tasteful program of originals and standards".

== Track listing ==
No.	Title	Writer(s)	Length
1.	"Tongue Twister"	Miller	6:38
2.	"Broad Street"	Miller	5:07
3.	"You and the Night and the Music"	Arthur Schwartz, Howard Dietz	7:11
4.	"Woeful Blues"	Miller	10:21
5.	"Lord, in the Morning Thou Shalt Hear"	Isaac Watts	4:21
6.	"Who Can I Turn To"	Leslie Bricusse, Anthony Newley	5:40
7.	"I'll Keep Loving You"	Bud Powell	7:10
8.	"My Minuet"	Miller	4:06
9.	"If It Ain't One Thing - It's Two"	Miller	6:06
10.	"Song of Today"	Miller	4:45

== Personnel ==
- Mulgrew Miller – piano
- Peter Washington – bass
- Tony Reedus – drums
