= Big Bags =

Studio album by Milt Jackson Orchestra
- Released: 1962
- Recorded: June 19–20 & July 5, 1962
- Genre: Jazz
- Length: 50:51
- Label: Riverside
- Producer: Orrin Keepnews

Milt Jackson chronology
| Lonely Woman (1962) | Big Bags (1962) | Invitation (1963) |

Big Bags is an album by vibraphonist Milt Jackson featuring big band performances arranged by Tadd Dameron and Ernie Wilkins recorded in 1962 and released on the Riverside label.

== Reception ==
In his January 3, 1963 review, Down Beat magazine critic John S. Wilson described the album thus: "A big band made up of top New York studio men that varies slightly in the course of three recording sessions, plus arrangements by Tadd Dameron and Ernie Wilkins provide the surrounding in which Jackson works here". "This is not really a big band album but a group of solo settings."

The Allmusic review by Scott Yanow awarded the album 4 stars calling it a "melodic and always-swinging set".

Professional ratings
Review scores
| Source | Rating |
|---|---|
| Down Beat | 3.5/5 stars |
| Allmusic | 4/5 stars |
| The Penguin Guide to Jazz Recordings | 3/4 stars |

== Track listing ==
All compositions by Milt Jackson except as indicated

1. "Old Devil Moon" (E. Y. Harburg, Burton Lane) - 3:07
2. "'Round Midnight" [Take 2] (Thelonious Monk) - 6:50
3. "'Round Midnight" [Take 1] (Monk) - 6:50 Bonus track on CD reissue
4. "The Dream Is You" (Tadd Dameron) - 3:11
5. "You'd Be So Nice to Come Home To" (Cole Porter) - 3:02
6. "Echoes" - 4:35
7. "If You Could See Me Now" (Dameron, Carl Sigman) - 5:17
8. "Star Eyes" [Take 5] (Gene de Paul, Don Raye) - 3:24
9. "Star Eyes" [Take 4] (de Paul, Raye) - 3:24 Bonus track on CD reissue
10. "Namesake" - 3:21
11. "If I Should Lose You" (Ralph Rainger, Leo Robin) - 3:36
12. "Later Than You Think" (Ernie Wilkins) - 4:43
  - Recorded in New York City on June 19 & 20 and July 5, 1962

== Personnel ==
- Milt Jackson – vibes
- Nat Adderley, Dave Burns, Bernie Glow, Ernie Royal, Doc Severinsen, Clark Terry, Snooky Young – trumpet
- Jimmy Cleveland, Paul Faulise, Melba Liston, Tom McIntosh – trombone
- Willie Ruff – French horn
- Earle Warren – alto saxophone
- George Dorsey – alto saxophone, flute
- James Moody, Jerome Richardson – alto saxophone, flute, tenor saxophone
- Jimmy Heath – tenor saxophone, flute
- Arthur Clarke, Tate Houston – baritone saxophone
- Hank Jones – piano
- Ron Carter – bass
- Connie Kay – drums
- Tadd Dameron, Ernie Wilkins – arranger, conductor
