= Backlash (Freddie Hubbard album) =

Studio album by Freddie Hubbard
- Released: Early May 1967
- Recorded: October 19 & 24, 1966
- Studios: Atlantic Studios, New York City
- Genre: Jazz
- Length: 40:06
- Labels: Atlantic; SD 1477
- Producer: Arif Mardin

Freddie Hubbard chronology
Jam Gems: Live at the Left Bank (2001)	Backlash (1967)	High Blues Pressure (1968)

Professional ratings
Review scores
Source	Rating
Allmusic	4.5/5 stars
The Rolling Stone Jazz & Blues Album Guide	4/5 stars
The Penguin Guide to Jazz Recordings	2.5/4 stars

Backlash is a 1967 album by trumpeter Freddie Hubbard, his first released on the Atlantic label. It features performances by Hubbard, James Spaulding, Albert Dailey, Bob Cunningham, Otis Ray Appleton and Ray Barretto.

== Reception ==
A reviewer on Dusty Groove commented "One of Freddie Hubbard's greatest records – a soaring bit of soulful modernism that's almost a precursor to 70s sounds on record labels like Black Jazz or Strata East! Freddie's at his early best here – stepping aside from some of the more serious Blue Note modes, and definitely feeling himself more strongly – reaching out with this righteous vibe that's quite different than later electric work in the 60s – and which, quite honestly, almost comes through best on this record than anywhere else! The group are wonderful too – and James Spaulding turns in some killer flute and alto work for the date – perfect for Freddie's lines on trumpet." Scott Yanow of AllMusic stated "The first of trumpeter Freddie Hubbard's three Atlantic albums, this excellent set falls between hard bop and the avant-garde, often hinting at both... Hubbard and Spaulding made for an excellent team and there are plenty of exciting moments on this brief but potent set.

== Track listing ==
All compositions by Freddie Hubbard except as indicated

1. "Backlash" (Donald Pickett) - 4:15
2. "The Return of the Prodigal Son" (Harold Ousley) - 5:42
3. "Little Sunflower" - 7:55
4. "On the Que-Tee" - 5:47
5. "Up Jumped Spring" - 6:43
6. "Echoes of Blue" (Cunningham) - 9:44

== Personnel ==
- Freddie Hubbard - trumpet, flugelhorn
- James Spaulding - flute, alto saxophone
- Albert Dailey - piano
- Bob Cunningham - bass
- Otis Ray Appleton - drums
- Ray Barretto - percussion (tracks 1,2,3)

== Charts ==
Chart performance for Backlash
Chart (1967)	Peak position
US Top R&B/Hip-Hop Albums (Billboard)	21
