= Lonely Woman (album) =

Studio album by Modern Jazz Quartet
- Released: 1962
- Recorded: January 24–25 & 29 and February 2, 1962; New York City
- Genre: Jazz
- Length: 43:37
- Label: Atlantic 1381
- Producer: Nesuhi Ertegun

Modern Jazz Quartet chronology
The Comedy (1962)	Lonely Woman (1962)	The Sheriff (1964)

Milt Jackson chronology
The Comedy (1962)	Lonely Woman (1962)	Big Bags (1962)

Alternate Cover

Professional ratings
Review scores
Source	Rating
Allmusic	5/5 stars
Down Beat	4/5 stars
The Penguin Guide to Jazz Recordings	3.5/4 stars

Lonely Woman is an album by American jazz group the Modern Jazz Quartet featuring performances recorded in 1962 and released on the Atlantic label.

== Reception ==
The Allmusic review called the album "one of the band's best efforts... A great disc that's perfect for the curious jazz lover".

== Track listing ==
All compositions by John Lewis except as indicated

1. "Lonely Woman" (Ornette Coleman) - 6:20
2. "Animal Dance" - 4:05
3. "New York 19" - 7:59
4. "Belkis" - 3:43
5. "Why Are You Blue?" (Gary McFarland) - 6:34
6. "Fugato" - 2:48
7. "Lamb, Leopard (If I Were Eve)" - 6:25
8. "Trieste" - 5:43

== Personnel ==
The Modern Jazz Quartet

- Milt Jackson - vibraphone
- John Lewis - piano
- Percy Heath - bass
- Connie Kay - drums

Production

- Nesuhi Ertegun – supervisor
- Phil Iehle – recording supervisor
- Tom Dowd – recording supervisor
- Loring Eutemey – artwork
- Richard Heimann – photography
