= The Quota (Jimmy Heath album) =

Studio album by Jimmy Heath
- Released: 1961
- Recorded: April 14 & 20, 1961; New York City
- Genre: Jazz
- Length: 38:20
- Label: Riverside; RLP 372
- Producer: Orrin Keepnews

Jimmy Heath chronology
Really Big! (1960)	The Quota (1961)	Triple Threat (1962)

The Quota is the third album by saxophonist Jimmy Heath featuring performances recorded in 1961 originally released on the Riverside label.

== Reception ==
Professional ratings
Review scores
Source	Rating
AllMusic	4/5 stars
DownBeat	3.5/5 stars
The Penguin Guide to Jazz Recordings	3.5/4 stars

The contemporaneous DownBeat reviewer, Leonard Feather, concluded: "All in all, a session that didn't aim too high and managed to hit the target." Stephen Cook of AllMusic says, "Jimmy Heath's considerable talents are very evident on this fine hard bop title... The Quota's strong material, tight arrangements, and thoughtful solos help make this Heath title one of the better hard bop releases available and a must for any jazz collection".

== Track listing ==
All compositions by Jimmy Heath except as indicated

1. "The Quota" - 5:08
2. "Lowland Lullaby" - 4:38
3. "Thinking of You" (Harry Ruby, Bert Kalmar) - 5:08
4. "Bells and Horns" (Milt Jackson) - 4:55
5. "Down Shift" - 5:47
6. "When Sunny Gets Blue" (Marvin Fisher, Jack Segal) - 6:29
7. "Funny Time" - 6:23

== Personnel ==
- Jimmy Heath - tenor saxophone
- Freddie Hubbard - trumpet
- Julius Watkins - French horn
- Cedar Walton - piano
- Percy Heath - bass
- Albert Heath - drums
