= Love and Understanding (Jimmy Heath album) =

Studio album by Jimmy Heath
- Released: 1973
- Recorded: June 11, 1973; RCA Studios, New York City
- Genre: Jazz
- Length: 38:03
- Label: Muse; MR 5028
- Producer: Don Schlitten

Jimmy Heath chronology
The Gap Sealer (1972)	Love and Understanding (1973)	The Time and the Place (1974)

Love and Understanding is an album by saxophonist Jimmy Heath featuring performances recorded in 1973 and originally released on the Muse label.

== Reception ==
Professional ratings
Review scores
Source	Rating
Allmusic	3/5 stars
The Rolling Stone Jazz Record Guide	4/5 stars
DownBeat	4/5 stars

Scott Yanow of Allmusic says, "This is one of Jimmy Heath's more unusual and versatile records".

DownBeat assigns the record 4 stars. Herb Nolan wrote, "Everyone involved with this date is excellent, but one would be surprised if they weren't. All are among the best playing today".

== Track listing ==
All compositions by Jimmy Heath except as indicated

1. "One for Juan" - 7:03
2. "In a Sentimental Mood" (Duke Ellington, Manny Kurtz, Irving Mills) - 5:07
3. "Head up! Feet Down!" - 7:11
4. "Far Away Lands" - 5:03
5. "Smilin' Billy" - 5:48
6. "Gemini" - 7:51

== Personnel ==
- Jimmy Heath - tenor saxophone, soprano saxophone, flute
- Curtis Fuller - trombone
- Bernard Fennell - cello
- Stanley Cowell - piano, electric piano
- Bob Cranshaw - electric bass
- Billy Higgins - drums, tambourine
