= You or Me (Jimmy Heath album) =

Studio album by Jimmy Heath
- Released: 1995
- Recorded: April 1995
- Genre: Jazz
- Length: 62:02
- Label: SteepleChase; SCCD 31370
- Producer: Nils Winther

Jimmy Heath chronology
Little Man Big Band (1992)	You or Me (1995)	Turn Up the Heath (2002)

You or Me is an album by saxophonist Jimmy Heath featuring performances recorded in 1995 and released on the SteepleChase label.

== Reception ==
Professional ratings
Review scores
Source	Rating
AllMusic	4.5/5 stars
The Penguin Guide to Jazz Recordings	4/4 stars

Ken Dryden at AllMusic noted "Jimmy Heath is in top form throughout this quartet session".

== Track listing ==
All compositions by Jimmy Heath except as indicated

1. "The Quota" – 7:23
2. "Rio Dawn" – 7:52
3. "Ballad from Upper Neighbors Suite" – 5:49
4. "Is That So?" (Duke Pearson) – 7:53
5. "Fungii Mama" (Blue Mitchell) – 6:53
6. "You or Me" – 7:15
7. "All Too Soon" (Duke Ellington, Carl Sigman) – 8:41
8. "Hot House" (Tadd Dameron) – 10:16

== Personnel ==
- Jimmy Heath – tenor saxophone
- Tony Purrone – guitar
- Kiyoshi Kitagawa – bass
- Albert Heath – drums
