= Jam Gems: Live at the Left Bank =

Live album by Freddie Hubbard & Jimmy Heath
- Released: January 30, 2001
- Recorded: June 13, 1965
- Genre: Jazz
- Length: 55:35
- Label: Label M

Freddie Hubbard chronology
The Night of the Cookers (1965)	Jam Gems: Live at the Left Bank (2001)	Backlash (1966)

Jimmy Heath chronology
On the Trail (1964)	Jam Gems: Live at the Left Bank (1965)	The Gap Sealer (1973)

Professional ratings
Review scores
Source	Rating
Allmusic	4.5/5 stars
The Penguin Guide to Jazz Recordings	3/4 stars

Jam Gems: Live at the Left Bank is collaboration live album by trumpeter Freddie Hubbard and tenor saxophonist Jimmy Heath recorded at the Left Bank ballroom in Baltimore in June 1965 and released on the Label M label in 2001. It features performances by Hubbard, Heath, Gus Simms, Wilbur Little, and Bertell Knox.

== Reception ==
The Allmusic review by Paula Edelstein states: "Jam Gems is jazz history documented at its finest and is a must-have for anyone interested in the energies and nuances of 'live' jazz in the '60s".

== Track listing ==
1. "All Members (incomplete)" (Jimmy Heath) - 4:01
2. "Bluesville" (Sonny Red Kyner) - 10:08
3. "Lover Man" (Jimmy Davis, Ram Ramirez, Jimmy Sherman) - 12:11
4. "What Is This Thing Called Love?" (Cole Porter) - 11:24
5. "Autumn Leaves" (Joseph Kosma, Johnny Mercer, Jacques Prévert) - 17:51

- Recorded by the Left Bank Jazz Society at the Famous Ballroom, Baltimore, Maryland on June 13, 1965

== Personnel ==
- Freddie Hubbard - trumpet
- Jimmy Heath - tenor saxophone
- Gus Simms - piano
- Wilbur Little - bass
- Bertell Knox - drums
