= Evidence (Vincent Herring album) =

Studio album by Vincent Herring
- Released: 1991
- Recorded: June 29 and July 2, 1990
- Studios: BMG Studios, NYC
- Genre: Jazz
- Length: 56:38 CD release with additional track
- Labels: Landmark; LLP/LCD 1527
- Producer: Orrin Keepnews

Vincent Herring chronology
American Experience (1990)	Evidence (1991)	Dawnbird (1993)

Evidence is an album by saxophonist Vincent Herring which was recorded in 1990 and released on Orrin Keepnews' Landmark label the following year.

== Reception ==
Professional ratings
Review scores
Source	Rating
AllMusic	4/5 stars

The AllMusic review by Scott Yanow stated "The underrated but talented hard bop altoist Vincent Herring is in excellent form on the quintet date Evidence. While Herring's tone is as usual a bit reminiscent of Cannonball Adderley, he comes up with many fresh ideas and swinging phrases on the eight songs ... Easily recommended to fans of Herring's straight-ahead playing".

== Track listing ==
All compositions by Vincent Herring except where noted

1. "Mr. Wizard" – 5:19
2. "I Sing a Song" (Tex Allen) – 8:10
3. "Stars Fell on Alabama" (Frank Perkins, Mitchell Parish) – 6:20
4. "Voyage" (Kenny Barron) – 5:55
5. "Hindsight" (Cedar Walton) – 7:35 Additional track on CD release
6. "Never Forget" – 6:32
7. "Evidence" (Thelonious Monk) – 7:46
8. "Soul-Leo" (Mulgrew Miller) – 8:40

== Personnel ==
- Vincent Herring - alto saxophone
- Wallace Roney – trumpet (tracks 1, 2, 4, 5, 7 & 8)
- Mulgrew Miller – piano
- Ira Coleman – bass
- Carl Allen – drums
