= With Our Own Eyes =

Studio album by Mulgrew Miller
- Released: May 1994
- Recorded: December 21–22, 1993
- Studio: Systems Two, Brooklyn, New York
- Genre: Jazz
- Length: 60:09
- Label: Novus
- Producer: Tim Patterson, Mulgrew Miller

Mulgrew Miller chronology
Hand in Hand (1992)	With Our Own Eyes (1994)	Getting to Know You (1995)

Professional ratings
Review scores
Source	Rating
Allmusic	4.5/5 stars
Tom Hull	B+

With Our Own Eyes is a studio album by American jazz pianist Mulgrew Miller with bassist Richie Goods and drummer Tony Reedus. The album was released in December 1993 by Novus Records. This is Miller's second record for Novus and tenth overall.

== Reception ==
Scott Yanow of Allmusic wrote "The consistent pianist Mulgrew Miller leads his trio ... through a set dominated by his originals but also including "Body and Soul" and Michel Legrand's "Summer Me, Winter Me." The McCoy Tyner influence will probably always remain a significant part of Miller's style but he is such a powerful player in his own right that one really does not mind. His originals on this set range from the modal 6/4 piece "Somewhere Else" and the thoughtful "Dreamin'" to the melancholy "Carousel." As with all of Mulgrew Miller's releases thus far, this one is well worth picking up". Reviewers of Billboard noted that "One of the unsung heroes of jazz piano, Miller is once again tasteful, poignant and on-target with a trio."

== Track listing ==
No.	Title	Writer(s)	Length
1.	"Somewhere Else"	Miller	5:48
2.	"Carousel"	Miller	6:52
3.	"Small Portion"	Miller	6:32
4.	"Dreamin'"	Miller	6:25
5.	"Body and Soul"	Frank Eyton, Johnny Green, Edward Heyman, Robert Sour	5:41
6.	"New Wheels"	Miller	5:14
7.	"Words"	Miller	6:04
8.	"When I Get There"	Miller	5:48
9.	"Summer Me, Winter Me"	Michel Legrand	5:34
10.	"Another Type Thang"	James Williams	6:11
Total length:			01:00:09

== Personnel ==
Band

- Mulgrew Miller – piano
- Richie Goods – bass
- Tony Reedus – drums

Production

- Michael Marciano – assistant engineer
- Daniel Miller – photography
- Jacqueline Murphy – art direction
- James Nichols – editing, engineer, mastering
- Tim Patterson – direction, director, producer
- Ed Reed – assistant engineer
- Sean Smith – design
