= Wingspan (Mulgrew Miller album) =

Studio album by Mulgrew Miller
- Released: 1987
- Recorded: May 11, 1987
- Studio: ERAS Studio, NYC.
- Genre: Jazz
- Length: 53:46
- Label: Landmark Records LLP-1515
- Producer: Orrin Keepnews

Mulgrew Miller chronology
Work! (1986)	Wingspan (1987)	Trio Transition (1987)

Wingspan is an album by jazz pianist Mulgrew Miller with a quintet of other musicians. The album was recorded on May 11, 1987, and released later that year by Landmark Records.

== Reception ==
Professional ratings
Review scores
Source	Rating
Allmusic	4.5/5 stars

Scott Yanow of Allmusic wrote that "The emphasis on this quintet album is on Mulgrew Miller's compositions; five of the seven numbers (all but Kenny Garrett's "Sonhos Do Brasil" and the standard "I Remember You") are by the pianist/leader. Miller is joined by bassist Charnett Moffett, drummer Tony Reedus, vibraphonist Steve Nelson and altoist Garrett (who plays flute on one song); percussionist Rudy Bird guests on three numbers. The inventive solos on the fairly complex material and the attractive sound of the ensembles make this a worthy release".

== Track listing ==
No.	Title	Writer(s)	Length
1.	"Wingspan"	Miller	5:34
2.	"One's Own Room"	Miller	6:44
3.	"The Eleventh Hour"	Miller	6:04
4.	"I Remember You"	Johnny Mercer, Victor Schertzinger	5:23
5.	"Soul-Leo"	Miller	7:50
6.	"You're That Dream"	Miller	7:29
7.	"Sonhos Do Brasil" (Dreams of Brazil)	Kenny Garrett	7:11
8.	"The Eleventh Hour" (later take)	Miller	7:31
Total length:			53:46

== Personnel ==
Band

- Mulgrew Miller – piano
- Charnett Moffett – bass
- Tony Reedus – drums
- Rudy Bird – percussion (tracks: 2 5 7)
- Kenny Garrett – saxophone, flute
- Steve Nelson – vibraphone

Production

- Orrin Keepnews – producer
- George Horn – mastering
- Tom Mark – recording
