= Trio Transition =

Studio album by Mulgrew Miller
- Released: 1987
- Recorded: December 16, 1987
- Studio: Big Box 901 Studio, Tokyo, Japan
- Genre: Jazz
- Length: 1:03:00
- Label: DIW DIW-8018
- Producer: Trio Transition

Mulgrew Miller chronology
Wingspan (1987)	Trio Transition (1987)	The Countdown (1988)

Professional ratings
Review scores
Source	Rating
Allmusic	4/5 stars

Trio Transition is the fourth studio album by American jazz pianist Mulgrew Miller together with drummer Frederick Waits and bassist Reggie Workman. The album was recorded on December 16, 1987 in Tokyo when that ad-hoc trio toured there, and released on the Japanese label DIW. The record was remastered in 2008 and re-released.

The trio also released the album Trio Transition with Special Guest Oliver Lake in 1988 which was recorded in New York.

== Reception ==
Ken Dryden of Allmusic noted that: "this is the first of the only two CDs they recorded for DIW prior to Waits' death in 1989. The two standards include a driving version of "I Hear a Rhapsody" and an easygoing "Like Someone in Love," though most of the session focuses on originals. Miller contributed three songs, including the constantly shifting post-bop vehicle "No Sidestepping," the unusually structured ballad "Whisper," and the thoughtful hard bop tune "Second Thoughts," the latter a tune that shows the influence of James Williams, with whom Miller had recorded previously while working with Art Blakey. Workman's "Shades of Angola" is introduced by Waits' furious solo before taking shape as a brisk samba as the others join the drummer. Waits' tense "Two Faces of Nasheet" (dedicated to his son, who also took up the drums) is easily the most exotic offering of the date, delivering a Far Eastern flavor and a hint of John Coltrane in Miller's McCoy Tyner-like solo, though it also shifts back and forth into a more conventional ballad setting."

== Track listing ==
No.	Title	Writer(s)	Length
1.	"I Hear a Rhapsody"	Jack Baker, George Fragos, Dick Gasparre	8:13
2.	"Shades of Angola"	Reggie Workman	8:36
3.	"Up Jumped Spring"	Freddie Hubbard	9:48
4.	"No Sidestepping"	Mulgrew Miller	6:07
5.	"Like Someone in Love"	Johnny Burke, James Van Heusen	7:03
6.	"Two Faces of Nasheet"	Frederick Waits	11:59
7.	"Whisper"	Mulgrew Miller	5:30
8.	"Second Thoughts"	Mulgrew Miller	5:44
Total length:			01:03:00

== Personnel ==
- Reggie Workman – bass
- Frederick Waits – drums
- Mulgrew Miller – piano
