= Little Man Big Band =

Studio album by Jimmy Heath
- Released: 1992
- Recorded: January 30 & 31 and March 3, 1992; BMG Studios, New York City
- Genre: Jazz
- Length: 51:56
- Label: Verve; 314 513 956-2
- Producer: Bill Cosby

Jimmy Heath chronology
You've Changed (1991)	Little Man Big Band (1992)	You or Me (1995)

Little Man Big Band (also written Little Man, Big Band) is a Grammy-nominated album by saxophonist Jimmy Heath featuring performances recorded in 1992 and released on the Verve label.

== Reception ==
Professional ratings
Review scores
Source	Rating
Allmusic	3/5 stars

David Dupont at Allmusic noted "Jimmy Heath brings to life his compositions, including his greatest hits 'CTA' and 'Gingerbread Boy,' with blaring, upper register trumpets, punchy trombone countermelodies and swirling saxophone ensembles".

== Track listing ==
All compositions by Jimmy Heath except as indicated

1. "Trane Connections" - 5:04
2. "Two Friends" (Bill Cosby, Stu Gardner) - 4:24
3. "The Voice of the Saxophone" - 7:46
4. "Forever Sonny" - 6:56
5. "C.T.A." - 7:01
6. "Ellington's Stray Horn" - 7:18
7. "Gingerbread Boy" - 5:06
8. "Without You, No Me" - 8:21

== Personnel ==
- Jimmy Heath - tenor saxophone, soprano saxophone, conductor
- Ted Nash, Jerome Richardson - alto saxophone
- Bill Easley - alto saxophone, tenor saxophone
- Billy Mitchell, Loren Schoenberg - tenor saxophone
- Danny Bank - baritone saxophone
- John Eckert, Virgil Jones, Bob Millikan, Claudio Roditi, Lew Soloff - trumpet
- Eddie Bert, John Mosca, Benny Powell - trombone
- Jack Jeffers - bass trombone
- Tony Purrone - guitar
- Roland Hanna - piano
- Ben Brown - bass
- Lewis Nash - drums
- Steve Kroon - percussion
