= The Gap Sealer =

Studio album by Jimmy Heath
- Released: 1973
- Recorded: March 1, 1972
- Studio: Bell Sound (New York City)
- Genre: Jazz
- Label: Cobblestone; 9012
- Producer: Don Schlitten

Jimmy Heath chronology
Jam Gems: Live at the Left Bank (1965)	The Gap Sealer (1973)	Love and Understanding (1973)

The Gap Sealer is an album by saxophonist Jimmy Heath featuring performances recorded in 1972 and originally released on the Cobblestone label but rereleased as Jimmy on the Muse label.

== Reception ==
Professional ratings
Review scores
Source	Rating
Allmusic	4/5 stars

Ron Wynn of Allmusic called the album "Some of Heath's finest, most aggressive playing. He is a standout on soprano, flute, and tenor".

== Track listing ==
All compositions by Jimmy Heath except as indicated

1. "Heritage Hum" - 7:48
2. "Invitation" (Bronislau Kaper, Paul Francis Webster) - 5:46
3. "A Sound for Sore Ears" - 7:20
4. "Gap Sealer" - 7:28
5. "Angel Man" - 7:20
6. "Alkebu-Lan (Land of the Blacks)" - 7:34

== Personnel ==
- Jimmy Heath - tenor saxophone, soprano saxophone, flute
- Kenny Barron - piano, electric piano
- Bob Cranshaw - electric bass
- Albert Heath - drums
- Mtume - congas, percussion
