= Young at Heart (Tony Williams album) =

Studio album by Tony Williams Trio
- Released: 1996
- Recorded: September 24 and 25, 1996
- Studio: CBS/Sony Studios, Shinano-Machi, Tokyo, Japan
- Genre: Jazz
- Length: 1:09:13
- Label: Sony Japan; SRCS 8212; Columbia; CK 69107
- Producer: Tony Williams

Tony Williams chronology
Wilderness (1996)	Young at Heart (1996)	Live at The Village Gate (2017)

Young at Heart is an album by the Tony Williams Trio, led by drummer Tony Williams, and featuring pianist Mulgrew Miller and double bassist Ira Coleman. Consisting primarily of jazz standards, it was recorded on September 24 and 25, 1996, at CBS/Sony Studios in Shinano-Machi, Tokyo, Japan, and was initially released in 1996 by Sony Japan, after which it was issued in the United States by Columbia Records in 1998. The recording would prove to be Williams's last, as he died roughly six months after the session.

== Reception ==
Professional ratings
Review scores
Source	Rating
AllMusic	4/5 stars
The Penguin Guide to Jazz	4/4 stars

In a review for AllMusic, Michael G. Nastos wrote: "Although this might not be viewed by fans as typical of Tony Williams, it is a logical conclusion to a brilliant career in jazz, and holds up high the lofty improvisational values he kept close to his vest, but near to our hearts. Recommended."

The authors of The Penguin Guide to Jazz Recordings awarded the album a full 4 stars, and stated: "It is not Williams's greatest record, but it is ample reminder that he was first and foremost a jazz man and one of the very greatest of the last 30 years... Williams hadn't been known as much of a standards player, but he caresses these as if they were second skin."

A writer for CMJ New Music Report commented: "Williams goes directly to the heart of the jazz repertoire, drumming with extraordinary sympathy, taste and eloquence. One doesn't often think of the drums as elegant, but in Williams's hands, one is inclined to think differently."

Bill Holland of Billboard listed the album in the #1 position in his contribution to the 1998 "Year in Music" critics' poll, calling it "a lovely goodbye."

== Track listing ==
1. "Promethean" (Mulgrew Miller) – 4:07
2. "Young at Heart" (Johnny Richards, Carolyn Leigh) – 5:48
3. "On Green Dolphin Street" (Bronisław Kaper, Ned Washington) – 8:53
4. "Farewell to Dogma" (Mulgrew Miller) – 5:52
5. "How My Heart Sings" (Earl Zindars) – 6:14
6. "The Fool on the Hill" (Lennon–McCartney) – 6:21
7. "Neptune: Fear Not" (Tony Williams) – 6:11
8. "You and the Night and the Music" (Arthur Schwartz, Howard Dietz) – 6:45
9. "Body and Soul" (Johnny Green, Edward Heyman) – 6:39
10. "This Here" (Bobby Timmons, Jon Hendricks) – 7:33
11. "Summer Me, Winter Me" (Alan and Marilyn Bergman, Michel Legrand) – 4:50

== Personnel ==
- Tony Williams – drums
- Mulgrew Miller – piano
- Ira Coleman – double bass
