= Trio Transition with Special Guest Oliver Lake =

Studio album by Mulgrew Miller
- Released: 1988
- Recorded: June 6–7, 1988
- Studios: A&R Recording Studio, NYC
- Genre: Jazz
- Length: 48:15
- Label: DIW Records DIW-829
- Producer: Zen Matsuura

Mulgrew Miller chronology
The Countdown (1988)	Trio Transition with Special Guest Oliver Lake (1988)	From Day to Day (1990)

Professional ratings
Review scores
Source	Rating
Allmusic	4.5/5 stars

Trio Transition with Special Guest Oliver Lake is a studio album by American jazz pianist Mulgrew Miller together with drummer Frederick Waits, bassist Reggie Workman, and saxophonist Oliver Lake. This is the sixth album for Miller as a bandleader; this is also second and final record for his Trio Transition. The album was released in 1988 by Japan's label DIW Records.

== Reception ==
David Dupont of Allmusic wrote "This session ... represents a free bop supergroup. Those names promise much, and the recording delivers that and more. This conjoining of talents results in an adventurous, free-swinging session informed by a keen sense of structure. The group's ability to match expansive free blowing with intriguing song forms is most pronounced on the ensemble's version of Stanley Cowell's joyful waltz, "Effie." The special rapport among the members of the core trio lifts the music, and at the heart of the trio is bassist Reggie Workman. The aptly named Workman moves up any session he's on a couple notches, and he's at his best here laying down a foundation of expansive, elastic lines and contributing powerful solos. On the opener he instigates pianist Mulgrew Miller's journey from bebop into the free beyond. The much-underrated Frederick Waits is at once colorful and earthbound. He also contributes two pieces, including a tribute to fellow drummer Ed Blackwell that features metric trickery and interlocking piano and saxophone lines. Guest Oliver Lake feasts on the support he receives, delivering a number of hearty orations".

Jack Fuller of Chicago Tribune wrote: "Oliver Lake`s alto saxophone and Mulgrew Miller`s piano complement one another on this set, recorded in 1988. At times both artists have seemed, despite prodigious technical skills, a bit empty. Here they find a sound they can authentically make their own. It is unemotional and affectless, but it still engages the audience rather than distancing it. Reggie Workman`s bass and Frederick Wart`s drums provide the solid foundation on which they build".

== Track listing ==
No.	Title	Writer(s)	Length
1.	"Planetside Trip"	Miller	8:05
2.	"Moon Storm"	Waits	7:16
3.	"Mr. Blackwell"	Waits	12:33
4.	"Effie"	Stanley Cowell	10:49
5.	"Variation of III"	Workman	5:16
6.	"November '80"	Lake	4:16
Total length:			48:15

== Personnel ==
Band

- Mulgrew Miller – piano
- Oliver Lake – sax (alto)
- Frederick Waits – drums
- Reggie Workman – bass

Production

- Angela Gomez – assistant engineer
- Zen Matsuura – producer
- Takao Ogawa – liner notes
- Kazunori Sugiyama – engineer
- Jim Anderson – engineer
- Shigeru Uchiyama – cover photo
