= Solo (Mulgrew Miller album) =

Live album by Mulgrew Miller
- Released: 2010
- Recorded: October 24, 2000
- Venue: Clermont-Ferrand, France
- Genre: Jazz
- Length: 54:07
- Label: Space Time

Mulgrew Miller chronology
The Duets (1999)	Solo (2010)	NHOP & Mulgrew Miller: The Duo – Live! (2000)

Solo is a solo piano album by Mulgrew Miller. It was recorded in 2000 and released by Space Time Records a decade later.

== Recording and music ==
The album was recorded in concert at the Jazz en Tête festival in Clermont-Ferrand in 2000. Miller plays his composition "Carousel" with stride influences. "My Old Flame" and "Body and Soul" are ballads, and other tracks are played at a greater tempo.

== Releases and reception ==
Professional ratings
Review scores
Source	Rating
Financial Times	4/5 stars

Solo was released by Space Time Records in 2010. The Financial Times described it as "a masterclass in the traditional jazz virtues of harmonic development and unflagging tempo." The New York Amsterdam News suggested that "it will be the album that fledgling musicians copy and practice by."

== Track listing ==
1. "Jordu" – 6:42
2. "Con Alma" – 9:35
3. "Carousel" – 8:27
4. "My Old Flame" – 7:20
5. "Dreamsville" – 4:01
6. "Yardbird Suite" – 6:45
7. "Body and Soul" – 6:44
8. "Giant Steps" – 4:41

== Personnel ==
- Mulgrew Miller – piano
