= Work! =

Studio album by Mulgrew Miller
- Released: 1986
- Recorded: April 23–24, 1986
- Studio: ERAS Studio, NYC.
- Genre: Jazz
- Length: 43:22
- Label: Landmark Records LLP-1511
- Producer: Orrin Keepnews

Mulgrew Miller chronology
Keys to the City (1985)	Work! (1986)	Wingspan (1987)

Professional ratings
Review scores
Source	Rating
Allmusic	4.5/5 stars

Work! is an album by jazz pianist Mulgrew Miller, featuring Charnett Moffett on bass and Terri Lyne Carrington on drums. The album was recorded on April 23–24, 1986, and released later that year by Landmark Records. The album is named after the song "Work" by Thelonious Monk and Sonny Rollins, from their 1954 album Thelonious Monk and Sonny Rollins.

== Reception ==
Scott Yanow of Allmusic noted: "Made about the time he left Art Blakey's Jazz Messengers to go out on his own, Mulgrew Miller's second date as a leader matches his modern mainstream modal style with bassist Charnett Moffett and drummer Terri Lyne Carrington. Once again, the repertoire is a mixture of Miller originals, jazz standards ("Without a Song," "Powell's Prances" and Thelonious Monk's "Work") and an unaccompanied piano solo ("My Man's Gone Now"). And once again, the set is recommended to fans of 1980s/'90s jazz piano".

== Track listing ==
No.	Title	Writer(s)	Length
1.	"Sublimity"	Miller	8:07
2.	"Without a Song"	Edward Eliscu, Billy Rose, Vincent Youmans	4:33
3.	"Blues Again"	Miller	6:19
4.	"Powell's Prances"	Richie Powell	3:27
5.	"Work"	Thelonious Monk	6:25
6.	"The Sage"	Miller	8:33
7.	"My Man's Gone Now"	George Gershwin, Ira Gershwin, DuBose Heyward	5:58
Total length:			43:22

== Personnel ==
Band

- Mulgrew Miller – piano, composer
- Charnett Moffett – bass
- Terri Lyne Carrington – drums

Production

- Phil Carroll – art direction
- George Horn – mastering
- Orrin Keepnews – liner notes, producer
- Chuck Stewart – photography
