= Hand in Hand (Mulgrew Miller album) =

Studio album by Mulgrew Miller
- Released: 1993
- Recorded: December 16–18, 1992
- Studio: BMG Studios, New York City
- Genre: Jazz
- Length: 61:53
- Label: Novus
- Producer: Orrin Keepnews, Mulgrew Miller

Mulgrew Miller chronology
Time and Again (1991)	Hand in Hand (1993)	With Our Own Eyes (1993)

Professional ratings
Review scores
Source	Rating
AllMusic	4.5/5 stars
Tom Hull	B+
Los Angeles Times	4/5 stars

Hand in Hand is a studio album by American jazz pianist Mulgrew Miller with Kenny Garrett on alto saxophone, Joe Henderson on tenor saxophone, Eddie Henderson on trumpet, Steve Nelson on vibraphone, Christian McBride on bass, and Lewis Nash on drums. The record was released in 1993 by Novus Records. It is Miller's ninth album as a bandleader.

== Reception ==
Scott Yanow of AllMusic wrote: "Mulgrew Miller, a talented McCoy Tyner-influenced pianist, leads an all-star septet on much of this date. The main stars, however, are Miller's nine diverse originals which range from modal to Monkish. With tenor-saxophonist Joe Henderson appearing on five selections, trumpeter Eddie Henderson on six and altoist Kenny Garrett heard throughout the full CD, Miller has a perfect frontline to interpret his tricky but logical originals."

Zan Stewart of the Los Angeles Times noted: "Pianist and composer Miller, making his Novus debut after eight sessions for Landmark, presents a splendid assortment of nine modern mainstream originals—one's by pianist Donald Brown—that are inventive, warm, visceral, swinging, direct and unabashedly musical."

== Track listing ==
No.	Title	Writer(s)	Length
1.	"Grew's Tune"	Miller	8:05
2.	"For Those Who Do"	Miller	6:41
3.	"Thinkin' out Loud"	Miller	7:56
4.	"Leilani's Leap"	Miller	5:41
5.	"Like the Morning"	Miller	5:24
6.	"Hand in Hand"	Miller	7:19
7.	"Return Trip"	Miller	6:01
8.	"Waltz for Monk"	Donald Brown	5:51
9.	"Neither Here nor There"	Miller	8:55
Total length:			01:01:53

== Personnel ==
Band

- Mulgrew Miller – piano, composer, liner notes, producer
- Kenny Garrett – sax (alto), sax (soprano)
- Eddie Henderson – flugelhorn, trumpet
- Joe Henderson – sax (tenor)
- Christian McBride – bass
- Lewis Nash – drums
- Steve Nelson – vibraphone

Production

- Steve Backer – director
- Daniela Barcelo – design
- Orrin Keepnews – producer
- Danny Miller – photography
- Jacqueline Murphy – art direction
- James Nichols – mastering, mixing

== Chart performance ==
Chart	Peak position
Billboard Top Jazz Albums (1993)	17
