= Keys to the City (Mulgrew Miller album) =

Studio album by Mulgrew Miller
- Released: 1985
- Recorded: June 28, 1985
- Studio: ERAS Studio, NYC.
- Genre: Jazz
- Length: 41:57
- Label: Landmark Records LLP 1507
- Producer: Orrin Keepnews

Mulgrew Miller chronology
Keys to the City (1985)	Work! (1986)

Professional ratings
Review scores
Source	Rating
Allmusic	4/5 stars

Keys to the City is the debut album by jazz pianist Mulgrew Miller, recorded on June 28, 1985, and released by Landmark Records.

== Background ==
The album is dedicated to Miller's wife, Tanya, and musicians who inspired him. The record contains eight compositions: four originals and four jazz standards. The originals are: the blues-inspired "Song for Darnell", named after his son; "Promethean", inspired by a Greek myth; "Portrait of a Mountain"; and "Saud's Run". The last two are dedicated to McCoy Tyner.

== Track listing ==
No.	Title	Writer(s)	Length
1.	"Song for Darnell"	Miller	6:33
2.	"Inner Urge"	Joe Henderson	3:51
3.	"Ev'ry Time We Say Goodbye"	Cole Porter	6:22
4.	"Promethean"	Miller	3:23
5.	"Milestones"	Miles Davis	4:20
6.	"Portrait of a Mountain"	Miller	8:03
7.	"Saud's Run"	Miller	5:46
8.	"Warm Valley"	Duke Ellington	3:39
Total length:			41:57

== Personnel ==
- Mulgrew Miller – piano
- Ira Coleman – bass
- Marvin Smith – drums
