= The Duets (Mulgrew Miller album) =

Studio album by Mulgrew Miller and Niels-Henning Ørsted Pedersen
- Released: 1999
- Recorded: January 15, 1999
- Studio: Studio 3, Broadcast House, Copenhagen.
- Genre: Jazz
- Length: 51:19
- Label: Bang & Olufsen B&O CD1
- Producer: Ib Skovgaard

Mulgrew Miller chronology
Getting to Know You (1993)	The Duets (1999)	Solo (2000)

The Duets is a studio album by American jazz pianist Mulgrew Miller and Danish bassist Niels-Henning Ørsted Pedersen. The album was recorded in Copenhagen on the Bang & Olufsen label and released in 1999. The record features famous compositions by pianist Duke Ellington as well as two originals by bandmembers. Their duo later became a trio with the occasional inclusion of drummer Alvin Queen in 2000.

== Background ==
In 1999–2000, Pedersen had the opportunity to make a studio recording to celebrate Duke Ellington's 100th birthday. The session was initially planned as a piano-and-bass duo, so NHØP chose Miller, whom he had never played with before. From that occasion on, they played together and had an affinity both as men and musicians. They opted for a repertoire based on the historic 1941 Duke Ellington–Jimmy Blanton duets. In 2000, NHØP and Miller recorded another album and toured around the world, commemorating Duke Elington's 100th birthday.

== Track listing ==
No.	Title	Writer(s)	Length
1.	"C Jam Blues"	Ellington	3:51
2.	"Sophisticated Lady"	Ellington	4:44
3.	"Pitter Patter Panther"	Ellington	3:16
4.	"I Got It Bad"	Ellington	5:27
5.	"What Am I Here For"	Ellington	4:16
6.	"Mood Indigo"	Barney Bigard, Duke Ellington	4:45
7.	"Blues in the PM's"	Mulgrew Miller	3:18
8.	"Come Sunday"	Ellington	4:49
9.	"Just Squeeze Me"	Ellington	5:04
10.	"Solitude"	Ellington	4:52
11.	"Caravan"	Duke Ellington, Juan Tizol	3:47
12.	"O.D. Blues"	N.-H. Ørsted Pedersen	3:10
Total length:			51:19

== Personnel ==
Band

- Mulgrew Miller – piano
- Niels-Henning Ørsted Pedersen – bass

Production

- Ib Skovgaard – producer
- Niels Erik Lund – engineer
- MHI Partners – booklet design
- Peter H. Larsen – executive producer
- Jordi Sunol – executive producer
- Hans P. Folmann – executive producer
- Jan Persson – photography
