= Landmark Records =

American record label

- Founded: 1985
- Founder: Orrin Keepnews
- Defunct: 1992
- Status: Inactive
- Genre: Jazz
- Country of origin: U.S.

Landmark Records was an American jazz record company and label founded in 1985 by Orrin Keepnews. Landmark's releases included music by Donald Byrd, Jack DeJohnette, Jimmy Heath, Vincent Herring, Bobby Hutcherson, Mulgrew Miller, Buddy Montgomery, and reissues of Cannonball Adderley.

Its catalogue also included two jazz albums by the Kronos Quartet in which they covered the work of Bill Evans and Thelonious Monk. Landmark was bought by Muse Records in 1993. Muse and Landmark were acquired by 32 Jazz in 1996. In 2003, Savoy Jazz (which had become a subsidiary of Nippon Columbia) acquired the rights to the Muse and Landmark catalogs from 32 Jazz.

== Discography ==
=== 1300 Series ===
LCD ARTIST TITLE

- 1301 Cannonball Adderley – Them Dirty Blues
- 1302 Cannonball Adderley – Cannonball's Bossa Nova
- 1303 Cannonball Adderley – Jazz Workshop Revisited
- 1304 Cannonball Adderley – Cannonball Adderley and the Poll-Winners
- 1305 Cannonball Adderley – The Cannonball Adderley Quintet at the Lighthouse
- 1306 Cannonball Adderley – Cannonball Takes Charge
- 1307 Cannonball Adderley – Cannonball in Europe!

(1301–1307 were released under The Cannonball Addderley Collection Volumes 1–7 and consisted of the Riverside Records masters (originally produced by Orrin Keepnews) that Adderley took with him when he moved to Capitol Records after Riverside Records went bankrupt. This explains why these were never released as part of the "Original Jazz Classics" series from Fantasy Records, the subsequent owner of the Riverside Records catalog–in addition, V.7 was previously unreleased in the US).

- 1308 Helen Merrill & Dick Katz – A Shade of Difference (reissue)
- 1309 Eddie "Cleanhead" Vinson and Cannonball Adderley – Cleanhead & Cannonball
- 1310 Bobby Hutcherson – Landmarks (compilation)

=== 500/1500 Series ===
Catalog No. (LLP/LCD)	Artist	Title	Notes
1501	Bobby Hutcherson	Good Bait	
1502	Yusef Lateef	In Nigeria	
1503	Keith MacDonald	This Is Keith MacDonald	
1504	Jack DeJohnette	The Jack DeJohnette Piano Album	
1505	Kronos Quartet	Monk Suite: Kronos Quartet Plays Music of Thelonious Monk	
1506	Jimmy Heath	New Picture	
1507	Mulgrew Miller	Keys to the City	
1508	Bobby Hutcherson	Color Schemes	
1509	Keith MacDonald	Waiting	
1510	Kronos Quartet	Music of Bill Evans	
1511	Mulgrew Miller	Work!	
1512	Buddy Montgomery	Ties of Love	
1513	Bobby Hutcherson	In the Vanguard	
1514	Jimmy Heath	Peer Pleasure	
1515	Mulgrew Miller	Wingspan	
1516	Donald Byrd	Harlem Blues	
1517	Bobby Hutcherson	Cruisin' the 'Bird	
1518	Buddy Montgomery	So Why Not?	
1519	Mulgrew Miller	The Countdown	
1520	Ralph Moore	Images	
1521	Charlie Rouse	Epistrophy	
1522	Bobby Hutcherson	Ambos Mundos	
1523	Donald Byrd Sextet featuring Joe Henderson	Getting Down to Business	
1524	Weslia Whitfield	Lucky to Be Me	
1525	Mulgrew Miller	From Day to Day	
1526	Ralph Moore	Furthermore	
1527	Vincent Herring	Evidence	
1528	Nat Adderley Quintet	Talkin' About You	
1529	Bobby Hutcherson	Mirage	
1530	Donald Byrd	A City Called Heaven	
1531	Weslia Whitfield	Live in San Francisco	
1532	Mulgrew Miller	Time and Again	
1533	Vincent Herring	Dawnbird	
1534	Elvin Jones	Live at the Village Vanguard Volume One	
1535	Joe Roccisano Orchestra	The Shape I'm In	
1536	Indigo Quartette	Quartette Indigo	
1537	Dannie Richmond Quintet	The Last Mingus Band A.D.	reissue of Gatemouth LP
1538	Jimmy Heath	The Time and the Place	
1539	Don Braden	Landing Zone	
1540	Leon Lee Dorsey	The Watcher	
1541	Joe Roccisano Orchestra	Leave Your Mind Behind	
1542	John Hicks	In the Mix	
1543	Mel Lewis	Mellifluous	reissue of Gatemouth LP
1544	Weslia Whitfield	Nice Work	
1545	John Hicks	Piece for My Peace	
1548	Michael Cochrane	Impressions	
1551	Weslia Whitfield with Mike Greenhill Quartet	Nobody Else But Me	reissue of Myoho LP

== See also ==
- List of record labels
