= Jimmy Heath =

American jazz saxophonist, composer, and band leader (1926–2020)

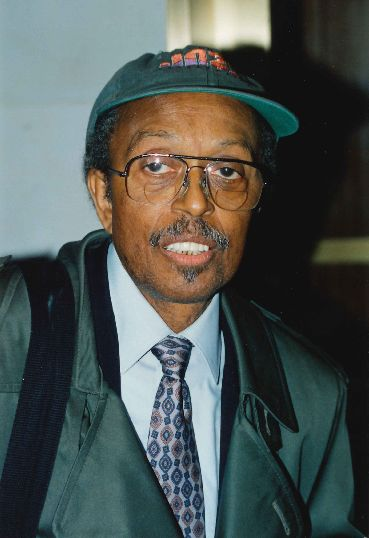
- Heath in 1998

Background information
- Also known as: Little Bird
- Born: James Edward Heath; October 25, 1926; Philadelphia, Pennsylvania, U.S.
- Died: January 19, 2020 (aged 93) Loganville, Georgia, U.S.
- Genres: Jazz; bebop; hard bop
- Occupations: Musician; composer; arranger; educator
- Instruments: Saxophone; flute
- Years active: 1940s–2020
- Labels: Riverside; Limelight; Impulse; Atlantic; Verve; Xanadu; Landmark; SteepleChase
- Formerly of: Heath Brothers
- Website: jimmyheath.com
- Relatives: Percy Heath (brother); Albert Heath (brother)

James Edward Heath (October 25, 1926 – January 19, 2020), nicknamed Little Bird, was an American jazz saxophonist, composer, arranger, and big band leader. He was the brother of bassist Percy Heath and drummer Albert Heath.

== Biography ==
Heath was born in Philadelphia on October 25, 1926. His father, an auto mechanic, played the clarinet, performing on the weekends. His mother sang in a church choir. The family frequently played recordings of big band jazz groups around the house. Heath's sister was a pianist, while his brothers were bassist Percy Heath (older) and drummer Albert Heath (his youngest sibling).

During World War II, Heath was rejected for the draft for being below the minimum weight.

Heath originally played alto saxophone. He earned the nickname "Little Bird" after his work for Howard McGhee and Dizzy Gillespie in the late 1940s, during which his playing displayed influences from Charlie Parker (Parker's nickname was "Bird"). He then switched to tenor saxophone.

From late 1945 through most of 1946, he performed with the Nat Towles band. In 1946, he formed his own band, which was a fixture on the Philadelphia jazz scene until 1949. The band included John Coltrane, Benny Golson, Specs Wright, Cal Massey, Johnny Coles, Ray Bryant, and Nelson Boyd. Charlie Parker and Max Roach sat in on one occasion. The band performed at venues such as the Apollo Theater in Harlem. Although Heath recalls that the band recorded a few demos on acetate, it never released any recordings, and its arrangements were lost at a Chicago train station. The band dissolved in 1949 so that Heath could join Dizzy Gillespie's band.

Heath was arrested and convicted twice for the sale of heroin; he was an acknowledged addict. The first time, in the spring of 1954, he was sent to the Federal Medical Center, Lexington, Kentucky, where many musicians and celebrities (and other people) were given treatment. After release, In early 1955, still an addict, he was arrested again, and served most of a six-year prison sentence in Lewisburg. He went cold turkey, and was able to spend a lot of his time engaged in music. While in prison he actually composed most of the Chet Baker and Art Pepper album Playboys (1956). He was released early, on May 21, 1959, and remained clean for the rest of his life; conditions of probation made it difficult, but he managed to start rebuilding his career.

He briefly joined Miles Davis's group in 1959, replacing Coltrane, and also worked with Kenny Dorham and Gil Evans. Heath recorded extensively as leader and sideman. During the 1960s, he frequently worked with Milt Jackson and Art Farmer.

In 1975, he and his brothers formed the Heath Brothers, also featuring pianist Stanley Cowell.

Jimmy Heath composed "For Minors Only", "Picture of Heath", "Bruh' Slim", and "CTA" and recorded them on his 1975 album Picture of Heath.

In the 1980s, Heath joined the faculty of the Aaron Copland School of Music at Queens College, City University of New York. With the rank of Professor, he led the creation of the Jazz Program at Queens College and attracted prominent musicians such as Donald Byrd to the campus. He also served on the board of the Louis Armstrong Archives on campus, and the restoration and management of the Louis and Lucille Armstrong Residence in Corona, Queens, near his own home. In addition to teaching at Queens College for more than 20 years, he also taught at Jazzmobile.

== Personal life ==
At a coming-home party the night after his release from Lewisburg Penitentiary, he met his eventual wife, Mona Brown, whom he married in 1960; they had two children, Roslyn and Jeffrey.

Heath was the father of R&B songwriter/musician James Mtume.

In 2010 his autobiography I Walked With Giants was published by the Temple University Press. Heath stood 5 feet, 3 inches.

He notably played in a jazz concert at the White House, when President Bill Clinton borrowed his saxophone for one number.

Heath died on January 19, 2020, in Loganville, Georgia, of natural causes.

== Awards and legacy ==
He received a Grammy nomination for box-set liner notes of The Heavyweight Champion, John Coltrane, the Complete Atlantic Recordings (Rhino, 1995), and Grammy nominations for Little Man Big Band (Verve, 1994) and Live at the Public Theatre with The Heath Brothers (Columbia, 1980).

Heath was a recipient of the 2003 NEA Jazz Masters Award. In 2004, he was awarded an honorary Doctorate in Human Letters.

Heath worked on over 100 albums and wrote more than 125 compositions. Many have since become jazz standards, recorded by artists such as; Art Farmer, Cannonball Adderley, Clark Terry, Chet Baker, Miles Davis, James Moody, Milt Jackson, Ahmad Jamal, Ray Charles, Dizzy Gillespie, J. J. Johnson, and Dexter Gordon. Heath also composed suites and string quartets, and a symphony, Three Ears, which premiered in 1988 at Queens College, with Maurice Peress conducting.

== Books ==
- Heath, Jimmy; McLaren, Joseph (2010). I Walked With Giants: The Autobiography of Jimmy Heath. Temple University Press. ISBN 978-1-4399-0198-4.

== Discography ==
=== As leader ===
- 1959: The Thumper (Riverside, 1960)
- 1960: Really Big! (Riverside, 1960)
- 1961: The Quota (Riverside, 1961)
- 1962: Triple Threat (Riverside, 1962)
- 1963: Swamp Seed (Riverside, 1963)
- 1964: Fast Company (Milestone, 1975)[2LP]
- 1964: On the Trail (Riverside, 1964)
- 1965: Jam Gems: Live at the Left Bank with Freddie Hubbard (Label M, 2001) – Live
- 1972: The Gap Sealer (Cobblestone, 1973) – also released as Jimmy (Muse, 1979)
- 1973: Love and Understanding (Muse, 1973)
- 1974: The Time and the Place (Landmark, 1994)
- 1975: Picture of Heath (Xanadu, 1975)
- 1985: New Picture (Landmark, 1985)
- 1987: Peer Pleasure (Landmark, 1987)
- 1991: You've Changed (SteepleChase, 1992)
- 1992: Little Man Big Band (Verve, 1992)
- 1995: You or Me (SteepleChase, 1995)
- 2004, 06: Turn Up the Heath (Planet Arts, 2006)
- 2007, 10: Endless Search (Origin, 2010)
- 2011: Togetherness: Live at the Blue Note (Jazz Legacy Productions, 2013) – Live
- 2020?: Love Letter (Impulse!, 2020)

Compilation

- Nice People - The Riverside Collection (Original Jazz Classics) – rec. 1959–64

With the Heath Brothers

- Marchin' On (Strata-East, 1975)
- Passin' Thru (Columbia, 1978)
- Live at the Public Theatre (Columbia, 1979)
- In Motion (Columbia, 1979)
- Expressions of Life (Columbia, 1980)
- Brotherly Love (Antilles, 1981)
- Brothers and Others (Antilles, 1981)
- As We Were Saying (Concord, 1997)
- Jazz Family (Concord, 1998)
- Endurance (Jazz Legacy Productions, 2009)

=== As sideman ===
With Kenny Dorham

- Kenny Dorham Quintet (Debut, 1953)
- Showboat (Time, 1960)

With Art Farmer

- The Time and the Place: The Lost Concert (Mosaic, 1966) - released 2007
- The Art Farmer Quintet Plays the Great Jazz Hits (Columbia, 1967)
- The Time and the Place (Columbia, 1967)
- Homecoming (Mainstream, 1971)

With Curtis Fuller

- Soul Trombone (Impulse!, 1962)
- Smokin' (Mainstream, 1972)

With Milt Jackson

- Vibrations (Atlantic, 1961)
- Big Bags (Riverside, 1962)
- Invitation (Riverside, 1962)
- Statements (Impulse!, 1962)
- Milt Jackson Quintet Live at the Village Gate (Riverside, 1962)
- Jazz 'n' Samba (Impulse! 1964)
- In a New Setting (Limelight, 1964)
- Ray Brown / Milt Jackson with Ray Brown (Verve, 1965)
- Born Free (Limelight, 1966)
- Olinga (CTI, 1974)

With Sam Jones

- The Soul Society (Riverside, 1960)
- The Chant (Riverside, 1961)
- Down Home (Riverside, 1962)

With Herbie Mann

- Latin Mann (Columbia, 1965)
- Big Boss Mann (1970)

With Blue Mitchell

- Blue Soul (Riverside, 1959)
- A Sure Thing (Riverside, 1962)

With others

- Nat Adderley, That's Right! (Riverside, 1960)
- Donald Byrd, Up with Donald Byrd (Verve, 1965)
- Benny Carter, Over the Rainbow (MusicMasters, 1989)
- Stanley Cowell, Regeneration (Strata-East, 1976)
- Continuum, Mad About Tadd (Palo Alto, 1980)
- Miles Davis, Miles Davis Volume 2 (Blue Note, 1953) – reissued mostly on Miles Davis Vol 1 - 12 inch LP
- Charles Earland, Black Drops (Prestige, 1970)
- Red Garland, The Quota (MPS, 1971)
- Bunky Green, My Babe (Vee-Jay, 1965) – rec. 1960
- Johnny Hartman, I've Been There (PErception, 1973)
- Albert Heath, Kwanza (The First) (Muse, 1973)
- Elmo Hope, Homecoming! (Riverside, 1961)
- Freddie Hubbard, Hub Cap (Blue Note, 1961)
- J. J. Johnson, All Stars (with Clifford Brown) (Blue Note, 1953) – reissued as The Eminent Jay Jay Johnson Volume 1 (1957)
- Carmell Jones, Jay Hawk Talk (Prestige, 1965)
- Howard McGhee, Howard McGhee and Milt Jackson (Savoy, 1948)
- The Modern Jazz Quartet, MJQ & Friends: A 40th Anniversary Celebration (Atlantic, 1994)
- Kanji Ohta & The Jazz Family, Our Jazz Family (JZAZ, 2012) – rec. 2002
- Don Patterson, These Are Soulful Days (Muse, 1972)
- Pony Poindexter, Pony's Express (Epic, 1962)
- Julian Priester, Keep Swingin' (Riverside. 1960)
- Don Sickler, The Music of Kenny Dorham (Reservoir, 1983)
- Don Sleet, All Members (Jazzland, 1961)
- Cal Tjader, Soul Sauce (Verve, 1965)
- Charles Tolliver, Music Inc. (Strata-East, 1970)
- Diego Urcola, Viva (Cam Jazz, 2007)
- Gerald Wilson, New York, New Sound (Mack Avenue, 2003)
- Nancy Wilson, Turned to Blue (2006)
