= Mulgrew Miller =

American jazz pianist (1955–2013)

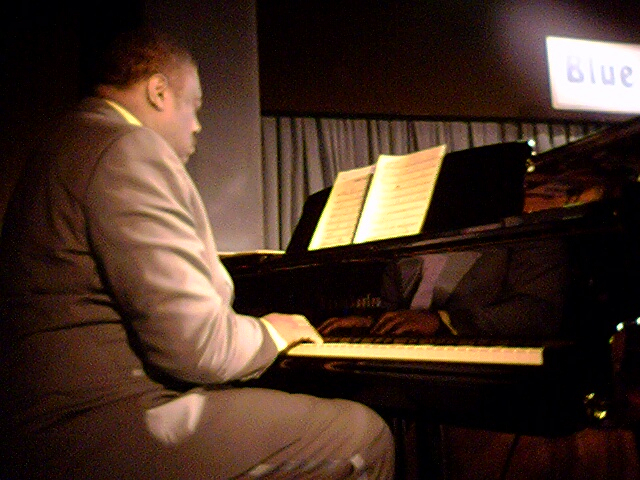
- Miller in 2004

Background information
- Born: August 13, 1955; Greenwood, Mississippi, U.S.
- Died: May 29, 2013 (aged 57) Allentown, Pennsylvania, U.S.
- Genres: Jazz
- Occupations: Musician, composer, educator
- Instrument: Piano
- Years active: 1970s–2013
- Labels: Landmark, Novus, Maxjazz, Stunt

Mulgrew Miller (August 13, 1955 – May 29, 2013) was an American jazz pianist, composer, and educator. As a child he played in churches and was influenced on piano by Ramsey Lewis and then Oscar Peterson. Aspects of their styles remained in his playing, but he added the greater harmonic freedom of McCoy Tyner and others in developing as a hard bop player and then in creating his own style, which influenced others from the 1980s on.

After leaving university he was pianist with the Duke Ellington Orchestra for three years, then accompanied vocalist Betty Carter. Three-year stints with trumpeter Woody Shaw and with drummer Art Blakey's high-profile Jazz Messengers followed, by the end of which Miller had formed his own bands and begun recording under his own name. He was then part of drummer Tony Williams' quintet from its foundation, while continuing to play and record with numerous other leaders, mostly in small groups.

Miller was director of jazz studies at William Paterson University from 2005, and continued to play and tour internationally with other high-profile figures in the music until his death from a stroke at the age of 57.

== Early life and education ==
Miller was born in Greenwood, Mississippi, to parents who had been raised on plantations. He had three brothers and four sisters. His family was not musical, but they had a piano, which no one in the house could play. Miller, however, played tunes on the piano from the age of six, playing by ear. He had piano lessons from the age of eight. As a child, he played blues and rhythm and blues for dances, and gospel music in a church. His family was Methodist, but he played in churches of multiple denominations. His principal influence on piano at this stage was Ramsey Lewis.

While in high school, Miller formed a trio that played at cocktail parties. His elder brother recommended that he listen to pianist Oscar Peterson, but there was no way of doing this in Greenwood until Peterson appeared on The Joey Bishop Show on television when Miller was about 14. After watching Peterson's performance, Miller decided to become a pianist: "It was a life changing event. I knew right then that I would be a jazz pianist". Miller later mentioned Art Tatum and Erroll Garner as piano influences during his teenage years. Miller reported years later that he always found that playing fast was easy, so playing slowly and with more control were what he had to work hardest on.

After graduating from Greenwood High School, Miller attended Memphis State University in 1973, attending with a band scholarship. He played euphonium, but, during his two years at the university, Miller met pianists Donald Brown and James Williams, who introduced him to the music of players such as Wynton Kelly, Bud Powell, and McCoy Tyner. Still at Memphis State, Miller attended a jazz workshop, where one of the tutors was his future bandleader, Woody Shaw, who stated that they would meet again in two years. They did meet again two years later, and Shaw remembered the young pianist.

After leaving Memphis State in 1975, Miller took lessons privately in Boston with Margaret Chaloff, who had taught many of the pianists that Miller admired. He later said: "I should have stayed with her longer, [...] but at that time I was so restless, constantly on the move." Miller played with saxophonists Ricky Ford and Bill Pierce in Boston. That winter, Miller was invited to Los Angeles by a school friend and decided to go, to escape the cold weather. He stayed on the West Coast for a year, playing locally in clubs and a church.

== Later life and career ==
=== 1976–86 ===
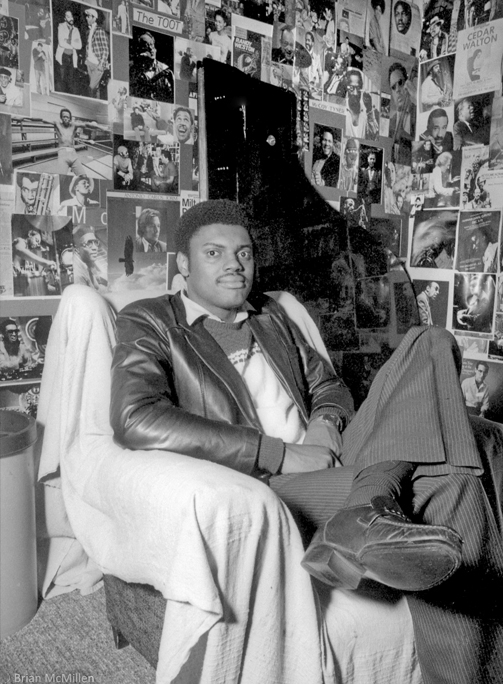
Miller at Keystone Korner in San Francisco, in 1983

Towards the end of 1976, Miller was invited to substitute for the regular pianist in the Duke Ellington Orchestra (by then led by Mercer Ellington; his father died in 1974). Miller had performed the same role for one weekend around a year earlier, and the new work was to be for only three weeks, but he ultimately toured with the orchestra for almost three years. His membership of the orchestra helped him, in the words of a piano magazine, to get "respect as a powerful, two-fisted pianist adept at delivering entrancingly lyrical and gracefully introspective runs as well as dazzling and buoyant passages".

In January 1980, Miller left the Duke Ellington Orchestra after being recruited by vocalist Betty Carter, with whom he toured for eight months that year. He was then part of Shaw's band from 1981 to 1983, thereby, in Miller's view, fulfilling his destiny from their earlier meetings. In 1981, he made his studio recording debut, on Shaw's United. During the early 1980s, he also accompanied vocalist Carmen Lundy, and played and recorded with saxophonist Johnny Griffin. Miller married on August 14, 1982.

Miller was recommended by Terence Blanchard and Donald Harrison for Art Blakey's Jazz Messengers, and he joined the drummer's band in 1983. Initially, he struggled to fit in with Blakey dominating the rhythm section, but Miller stated that, over his period with the band: "My playing just generally matured. I don't think one single characteristic changed, but the experience certainly boosted my confidence". At times during concert performances he was allotted a solo piano spot, which Miller used to play medleys. His presence in the Jazz Messengers cemented his reputation within jazz. His recording career as a leader began in 1985, with Keys to the City, the first of Miller's several recordings for Landmark, which continued with Work! the following year. Jon Pareles' review of a solo concert in 1986 observed that Miller's playing showed the influence of Powell on some numbers and Kelly on others, but that, overall, he was developing "his own, authoritative style".

=== Later 1986–94 ===
After leaving Blakey in 1986, Miller was pianist in drummer Tony Williams' quintet from its foundation that year until it disbanded around 1993. Miller remained active between tours with Williams' band, in part by touring with his own groups. The first of these was formed in 1987 and named Wingspan, as, Miller explained, "sort of a dedication to the legacy of Charlie Parker – Bird, you know". It became one of Miller's main bands, enduring through changes of personnel, and featured a lot of his compositions in its performances. Another band was known as Trio Transition, which contained bassist Reggie Workman and drummer Freddie Waits. They released the album of the same name in 1987.

Miller also played on Williams bandmate Wallace Roney's first three recordings (1987–89), and many other albums recorded by other leaders in the late 1980s. These included an album with long-term collaborator Steve Nelson, a recording by trumpeter Donald Byrd, comeback albums from alto saxophonist Frank Morgan, and the first of a series of releases with tenor saxophonist Benny Golson.

Miller and his family moved to Palmer Township in the Lehigh Valley region of eastern Pennsylvania in 1989. The same year, he joined three other pianists in recording a CD tribute to Memphis-born pianist Phineas Newborn, Jr. This group, the Contemporary Piano Ensemble, performed intermittently until 1996, often playing together on four separate pianos. In 1990, Miller traveled to the Soviet Union to appear as pianist in Benny Golson's band at the first Moscow International Jazz Festival.

In 1992, Miller also toured domestically and internationally with the New York Jazz Giants, a septet containing Jon Faddis, Tom Harrell, Lew Tabackin, Bobby Watson, Ray Drummond, and Carl Allen. Miller continued to accompany vocalists, including on recordings with Dianne Reeves and Cassandra Wilson. Starting in 1993, he also played and recorded with saxophonist Joe Lovano.

The influence of Williams continued into Miller's own projects, including their compositions and arrangements: The Guardian reviewer of Miller's 1992 Hand in Hand, his first for Novus Records, commented that "it's his occasional boss, drummer Tony Williams, who has made the strongest impression on the way he organises the material. The opening 'Grew's Tune' and the bluesier numbers would slot unnoticed into the Williams library."

=== 1995–2013 ===
For several years after he turned 40, Miller concentrated on composing and playing his own music. He reduced his recording and club appearances, as well as one-day associations. The stimulus for this change had built gradually from Miller's first studio recording in 1981: "my recording activity increased and by the time that it got into 1986–87 I was on so many records it was unbelievable until eventually it became rather overwhelming and stressful, so I had to cut back." He did continue to record, often with musicians he had established relationships with: in 1996 he reunited with Williams to appear on what became the drummer's final recording, Young at Heart; further albums led by Kenny Garrett, Nelson, Reeves, and others were made in the period 1997–99.

In 1997, Miller toured Japan with 100 Golden Fingers, a troupe of 10 pianists. He joined bassist Niels-Henning Ørsted Pedersen in 1999 to record The Duets an album based on 1940s performances by Duke Ellington and Jimmy Blanton. The two men toured Europe the following year, with drummer Alvin Queen added for some concerts.

In 2002, Miller's discography as leader began to expand again, as Maxjazz started to release recordings. A series of four concert recordings were released over the following years: Live at The Kennedy Center Vol. 1 and Live at The Kennedy Center Vol. 2 (recorded in 2002), with Derrick Hodge (bass) and Rodney Green (drums); and Live at Yoshi's Vol. 1 and Live at Yoshi's Vol. 2 (recorded in 2003), with Hodge and Karriem Riggins (drums). In 2002 Miller joined bassist Ron Carter's Golden Striker Trio, with guitarist Russell Malone. The trio occasionally toured internationally for the next decade. In 2003, Miller was commissioned to write a score for the Dayton Contemporary Dance Company; after writing The Clearing in the Woods and having it choreographed by Ronald K. Brown, Miller and his band played the piece for performances by the company.

In the mid-2000s, Miller joined bassist Dave Holland's band, changing it from a quintet to a sextet, and adding gospel and soul elements to the group's sound. Around this time, Miller had two regular bands of his own: a piano trio, and a quintet featuring saxophone and vibraphone. He also became heavily involved in music education: Miller was the Director of Jazz Studies at William Paterson University from 2005, and was the Artist in Residence at Lafayette College in 2008, which was two years after it had awarded him an honorary doctorate in Performing Arts.

A 2000 concert recording entitled Solo, was released in 2010 and was well received by critics for the imagination and harmonic development in Miller's playing. Also in 2010, Miller joined guitarist John Scofield's new band. That year, Miller had a minor stroke. After this, he took medicine, changed his diet and lost weight; he also reduced his touring and recording. In February 2012 he traveled to Denmark to play with Klüvers Big Band; selections from one of the five concerts were released under Miller's co-leadership as Grew's Tune. In autumn 2012, he performed as a piano duo with Kenny Barron, continuing an association that had begun some years earlier. In the winter of that year he toured Europe as part of a quintet led by reeds players Yusef Lateef and Archie Shepp.

On May 24, 2013, Miller was admitted to Lehigh Valley Hospital–Cedar Crest in Allentown, Pennsylvania after suffering another stroke. He died there on May 29. Miller was survived by his wife, son, daughter, and grandson.

Miller made more than 15 albums under his own name during his career, and appeared on more than 400 for other leaders. His last working trio consisted of Ivan Taylor on bass and Green on drums. Bassist Christian McBride commented on the day of Miller's death: "I sincerely hope every self-respecting jazz musician takes this day to reflect on all the music Mulgrew left us."

== Personality ==
Miller was quiet and gentle, and was "a modest man, with a self-deprecating sense of humour". Miller described his own attitude towards music in a 2005 interview:

I worked hard to maintain a certain mental and emotional equilibrium. It's mostly due to my faith in the Creator. I don't put all my eggs in that basket of being a rich and famous jazz guy. That allows me a certain amount of freedom, because I don't have to play music for money. I play music because I love it.

== Style and influence ==
Ben Ratliff, writing for The New York Times, commented that, "As a composer, Mr. Miller is difficult to peg; like his piano playing, he's a bit of everything." Critic Ted Panken observed in 2004 that Miller the pianist "finds ways to conjure beauty from pentatonics and odd intervals, infusing his lines with church and blues strains and propelling them with a joyous, incessant beat". John Fordham in The Guardian commented that Miller's "melodic fluency and percussive chordwork [...] recalled Oscar Peterson [...but] with glimpses of the harmonically freer methods of McCoy Tyner", and that Miller was much more than the hard bop player that he was often stereotyped as being. The obituary writer for DownBeat observed that "Miller could swing hard but maintained grace and precision with a touch and facility that influenced generations of musicians."

Miller had a strong reputation with fellow musicians. Pianist Geoffrey Keezer was convinced that he wanted to be a pianist after attending a performance by Miller in 1986. Vibraphonist Warren Wolf stated that Miller helped him early in his career, including by being a link to jazz history: "you're getting that experience of playing with Art Blakey, that attitude of 'Yes, it's my band, but you have to give other people a chance to shine.'" Robert Glasper also cited Miller as an influence, and wrote and recorded "One for 'Grew" as a tribute.

Speaking in 2010, Miller commented on his approach to playing standards, which was more conservative than that of many others: "I believe in giving due respect to the melody, playing it as true as possible, [...] a solo is a creative process that improves the melody." He almost never transcribed recordings (something that jazz musicians are typically taught to do); Miller credited this with slowing his learning process, but also with allowing him to express himself more freely, as he reached his own understanding of the compositions he played.

Miller explained the lack of critical attention he received, saying, "Guys who do what I am doing are viewed as passé." He also contrasted his own approach with that of performers who produced "interview music": "something that's obviously different, and you get the interviews and a certain amount of attention".
