= Art Farmer discography =

This is an incomplete list, which will never be able to satisfy particular standards for completeness as it excludes bootlegs, mix tapes and other minor records by independent labels.

Art Farmer was a jazz musician who played trumpet, flugelhorn and flumpet. His appearances on record date from 1948 to 1998 and include more than 60 albums under his own name and more than 70 as a sideman, in addition to a dozen with the Jazztet. His appearances on film are also listed on this page, including his two appearances in Hollywood productions.

== Discography ==
Years refer to the date of Farmer's appearance on the recording.

=== As leader ===
Year recorded	Title	Label	Year released	Notes
1953–1954	The Art Farmer Septet	Prestige	1956	Farmer's debut recordings as leader. With Jimmy Cleveland, Quincy Jones or Horace Silver, Monk Montgomery or Percy Heath
1954	Early Art	Prestige	1962	With two bands: first featuring Sonny Rollins (tenor sax) and Horace Silver (piano); second featuring Wynton Kelly (piano)
1954–1955	When Farmer Met Gryce	Prestige	1955	With Gigi Gryce (alto sax) and two bands: first with Horace Silver (piano), Percy Heath (bass), Kenny Clarke (drums); second with Freddie Redd (piano) Addison Farmer (bass) Art Taylor (drums)
1955	Art Farmer Quintet featuring Gigi Gryce	Prestige	1956	With Gigi Gryce (alto sax) Duke Jordan (piano), Addison Farmer (bass), Philly Joe Jones (drums)
1956	2 Trumpets	Prestige	1957	With Donald Byrd (trumpet), Jackie McLean (alto sax), Barry Harris (piano), Doug Watkins (bass), Art Taylor (drums)
1956	Farmer's Market	Prestige	1958	With Hank Mobley (tenor sax), Kenny Drew (piano), Addison Farmer (bass), Elvin Jones (drums)
1957	Three Trumpets	Prestige	1957	With Donald Byrd and Idrees Sulieman (trumpet), Hod O'Brien (piano), Addison Farmer (bass), Ed Thigpen (drums)
1957	Last Night When We Were Young	ABC-Paramount	1958	With the Quincy Jones orchestra; Jones also wrote the arrangements
1958	Portrait of Art Farmer	Contemporary	1958	With Hank Jones (piano), Addison Farmer (bass), Roy Haynes (drums)
1958	Modern Art	United Artists	1958	With Benny Golson (tenor sax), Bill Evans (piano), Addison Farmer (bass), Dave Bailey (drums)
1959	Brass Shout	United Artists	1959	With big band; arrangements by Benny Golson
1959	The Aztec Suite	United Artists	1959	With big band; arrangements by Chico O'Farrill
1960	Art	Argo	1960	With Tommy Flanagan (piano), Tommy Williams (bass), Albert Heath (drums)
1961	Perception	Argo	1964	With Harold Mabern (piano), Tommy Williams (bass), Roy McCurdy (drums)
1962	Listen to Art Farmer and the Orchestra	Mercury	1963	With big band; arrangements by Oliver Nelson
1963	Interaction	Atlantic	1963	With Jim Hall (guitar), Steve Swallow (bass), Walter Perkins (drums)
1963	Live at the Half-Note	Atlantic	1964	Personnel as on Interaction; in concert
1964	To Sweden with Love	Atlantic	1964	With Jim Hall (guitar), Steve Swallow (bass), Pete LaRoca (drums)
1964	The Many Faces of Art Farmer	Scepter	1964	With Charles McPherson (alto sax), Tommy Flanagan (piano), Steve Swallow (bass), Bobby Thomas (drums)
1965	Sing Me Softly of the Blues	Atlantic	1965	With Steve Kuhn (piano), Steve Swallow (bass), Pete LaRoca (drums)
1965–1966	Group Therapy	Scepter	1966	Credited to the New York Jazz Sextet
1966	The Time and the Place: The Lost Concert	Mosaic	2007	With Jimmy Heath (tenor sax), Albert Dailey (piano), Walter Booker (bass), Mickey Roker (drums); in concert
1966	Baroque Sketches	Columbia	1967	With the Baroque Orchestra arranged by Benny Golson
1967	The Time and the Place	Columbia	1967	With Jimmy Heath (tenor sax), Cedar Walton (piano), Walter Booker (bass), Mickey Roker (drums); studio album with overdubbed applause
1967	The Art Farmer Quintet Plays the Great Jazz Hits	Columbia	1967	Personnel as on The Time and the Place (1967)
1968	Art Worker	Lotus	1979	With Ernie Royal (trumpet), Jimmy Cleveland (trombone), Oscar Estelle (alto, tenor, baritone saxes), Harold Mabern (piano), Jimmy Woode (bass), Roy McCurdy (drums)
1968	What Happens?	Campi-Editore Recording	1968	With Phil Woods (alto sax), Martial Solal (piano), Henri Texier (bass), Daniel Humair (drums)
1970	In Europe	Enja	1998	With Fritz Pauer (piano), Peter Marshall (bass), Erich Bachtragl (drums); in concert
1970	From Vienna with Art	MPS	1970	With Jimmy Heath (tenor sax), Fritz Pauer (piano), Jimmy Woode (bass), Erich Bachtragl (drums)
1971	Homecoming	Mainstream	1971	With Jimmy Heath (tenor sax), Cedar Walton (piano), Sam Jones (bass), Billy Higgins (drums), James Mtume (congas), Warren Smith (percussion)
1972	Gentle Eyes	Mainstream	1972	With big band; arrangements by Hans Salomon
1974	Talk to Me	Pye	1975	With the ORF [Austrian Broadcasting Corporation] Big Band
1974	A Sleeping Bee	Grammofonverket	1974	With Goran Strandberg (piano), Jan Schaffer (guitar), Red Mitchell (bass), Tony Inzalaco and Island Ostlund (drums; separately), Sabu Martinez (percussion)
1975	Yesterday's Thoughts	East Wind	1976	With Cedar Walton (piano), Sam Jones (bass), Billy Higgins (drums)
1975	To Duke with Love	East Wind	1976	With Cedar Walton (piano), Sam Jones (bass guitar), Billy Higgins (drums)
1976	The Summer Knows	East Wind	1977	Personnel as on To Duke with Love
1976	Art Farmer Quintet at Boomers	East Wind	1976	With Clifford Jordan (tenor sax), Cedar Walton (piano), Sam Jones (bass) Billy Higgins (drums); in concert
1976	On the Road	Contemporary	1976	With Art Pepper (alto sax), Hampton Hawes (piano), Ray Brown (bass), Steve Ellington and Shelly Manne (drums; separately)
1977	Crawl Space	CTI	1977	With Jeremy Steig (flute), David Grusin (keyboards), Eric Gale (guitar), Will Lee (bass, gong), George Mraz (bass), Steve Gadd (drums)
1977	Something You Got	CTI	1977	With the David Matthews orchestra, featuring Yusef Lateef (tenor sax)
1977	Art Farmer Live in Tokyo	CTI	1977	With Jackie McLean (alto sax), Cedar Walton (piano), Sam Jones (bass), Billy Higgins (drums); in concert
1978	Big Blues	CTI	1979	With Jim Hall (guitar), Mike Mainieri (vibraphone), Mike Moore (bass), Steve Gadd (drums)
1979	Yama	CTI	1979	Featuring Joe Henderson (tenor sax)
1981	A Work of Art	Concord	1982	With Fred Hersch (piano), Bob Bodley (bass), Billy Hart(drums)
1981	Manhattan	Soul Note	1982	With Sahib Shihab (soprano and baritone saxes), Kenny Drew (piano), Mads Vinding (bass), Ed Thigpen (drums)
1981	Foolish Memories	Bellaphon	1981	With Harry Sokal (tenor sax), Fritz Pauer (piano), Heiri Känzig (bass), Joris Dudli (drums)
1982	Mirage	Soul Note	1982	With Clifford Jordan (tenor sax), Fred Hersch (piano), Ray Drummond (bass), Akira Tana (drums)
1982	Warm Valley	Concord	1983	With Fred Hersch (piano), Ray Drummond (bass), Akira Tana (drums)
1983	Ambrosia	Denon	1984	With The Great Jazz Trio
1983	Maiden Voyage	Denon	1984	With strings, Masahiko Satoh (piano)
1984	You Make Me Smile	Soul Note	1986	With Clifford Jordan (tenor sax), Fred Hersch (piano) Rufus Reid (bass), Akira Tana (drums)
1987	Something to Live For: The Music of Billy Strayhorn	Contemporary	1987	With Clifford Jordan (tenor sax), James Williams (piano), Rufus Reid (bass), Marvin "Smitty" Smith (drums)
1987	Azure	Soul Note	1987	With Fritz Pauer (piano)
1988	Blame It on My Youth	Contemporary	1988	With Clifford Jordan (tenor and soprano sax), James Williams (piano), Rufus Reid (bass), Victor Lewis (drums)
1989	Ph.D.	Contemporary	1989	With Clifford Jordan (tenor sax), James Williams (piano), Kenny Burrell (guitar), Rufus Reid (bass), Marvin "Smitty" Smith (drums)
1989	Central Avenue Reunion	Contemporary	1990	With Frank Morgan (alto sax), Lou Levy (piano), Eric Von Essen (bass), Albert Heath (drums)
1991	Soul Eyes	Enja	1992	With Geoff Keezer (piano), Kenny Davis (bass), Lewis Nash (drums); in concert
1994	The Company I Keep	Arabesque	1994	With Tom Harrell (trumpet, flugelhorn), Ron Blake (soprano and tenor saxes), Geoff Keezer (piano), Kenny Davis (bass), Carl Allen (drums)
1995	The Meaning of Art	Arabesque	1995	With Slide Hampton (trombone), Ron Blake (soprano and tenor saxes), Geoff Keezer (piano), Kenny Davis (bass), Carl Allen (drums)
1996	Silk Road	Arabesque	1997	With Don Braden and Ron Blake (soprano and tenor saxes), Geoff Keezer (piano), Kenny Davis (bass), Carl Allen (drums)
1996	Live at Stanford Jazz Workshop	Monarch	1997	With Harold Land (tenor sax), Bill Bell (piano), Rufus Reid (bass), Albert Heath (drums); in concert
1998	Art Farmer Plays Standards	PAO	2000	With Jarek Smietana (guitar), Jacek Niedziela and Antoni Debski (bass; separately), Adam Czerwinski (drums)

=== With the Jazztet ===
All feature Benny Golson (tenor sax)

Year recorded	Title	Label	Year released	Notes
1960	Meet the Jazztet	Argo	1960	With Curtis Fuller (trombone), McCoy Tyner (piano), Addison Farmer (bass), Lex Humphries (drums)
1960	Big City Sounds	Argo	1960	With Tom McIntosh (trombone), Cedar Walton (piano), Tommy Williams (bass), Albert Heath (drums)
1960–1961	The Jazztet and John Lewis	Argo	1961	Personnel as on Big City Sounds; John Lewis (composer, arranger)
1961	The Jazztet at Birdhouse	Argo	1961	Personnel as on Big City Sounds; in concert
1962	Here and Now	Mercury1	1962	With Grachan Moncur III (trombone), Harold Mabern (piano), Herbie Lewis (bass), Roy McCurdy (drums)
1962	Another Git Together	Mercury	1962	Personnel as on Here and Now
1982	Voices All	Eastworld	1983	With Curtis Fuller, Cedar Walton, Buster Williams (bass), Albert Heath
1982	In Performance at the Playboy Jazz Festival	Elektra/Musician	1984	With Mike Wolff (piano), John B. Williams (bass), Roy McCurdy, Nancy Wilson (vocals); in concert; shared with various bands
1983	Moment to Moment	Soul Note	1983	With Curtis Fuller, Mickey Tucker (piano), Ray Drummond (bass), Albert Heath
1983	Nostalgia	Baystate	1988	With Curtis Fuller, Mickey Tucker, Rufus Reid (bass), Billy Hart (drums)
1986	Back to the City	Contemporary	1986	With Curtis Fuller, Mickey Tucker, Ray Drummond, Marvin 'Smitty' Smith (drums); in concert
1986	Real Time	Contemporary	1988	Personnel as on Back to the City; in concert

=== Albums as sideman ===
Year recorded	Leader	Title	Label
1949	(Various)	Black California	Savoy
1953	Clifford Brown	The Clifford Brown Big Band In Paris	Prestige
1953	Clifford Brown	Memorial	Prestige
1953	Quincy Jones	Jazz Abroad	EmArcy
1953	Lionel Hampton	European Concert 1953	IAJRC
1953	Clifford Brown	The Complete Paris Collection, Vol. 3	Jazz Legacy
1955	Gene Ammons	All Star Sessions	Prestige
1956	Gene Ammons	The Happy Blues	Prestige
1956	Gene Ammons	Jammin' with Gene	Prestige
1956	Quincy Jones	This Is How I Feel About Jazz	ABC
1956	Johnny Mathis	Johnny Mathis	Columbia
1956	Teddy Charles	The Teddy Charles Tentet	Atlantic
1956	Oscar Pettiford	The Oscar Pettiford Orchestra in Hi-Fi	ABC-Paramount
1956	Teddy Charles	Word from Bird	Atlantic
1956	Bennie Green	Bennie Green with Art Farmer	Prestige
1956	Hal McKusick	The Jazz Workshop	RCA Victor
1956	Gil Mellé	Gil's Guests	Prestige
1956	George Russell	The Jazz Workshop	RCA Victor
1956	Earl Coleman	Earl Coleman Returns	Prestige
1957	Manny Albam	The Jazz Greats of Our Time, Vol. 1	Coral
1957	Gene Ammons	Funky	Prestige
1957	Kenny Burrell	Earthy	Prestige
1957	Jimmy Cleveland	Cleveland Style	EmArcy
1957	Eddie Costa	Eddie Costa Quintet	Interlude
1957	Sonny Clark	Dial "S" for Sonny	Blue Note
1957	Curtis Fuller	Curtis Fuller Volume 3	Blue Note
1957	Benny Golson	Benny Golson's New York Scene	Contemporary
1957	Oscar Pettiford	The Oscar Pettiford Orchestra in Hi-Fi Volume Two	ABC-Paramount
1957	Clifford Jordan	Cliff Craft	Blue Note
1957	Joe Holiday	Holiday for Jazz	Decca
1957	Prestige All Stars	Earthy	Prestige
1957	Prestige All Stars	Three Trumpets	Prestige
1957	Prestige All Stars	Coolin'	New Jazz
1957	(Various)	Modern Jazz Concert	Columbia
1957	Horace Silver	The Stylings of Silver	Blue Note
1957	Hal McKusick	Hal McKusick Quintet	Coral
1957	Hank Mobley	Hank Mobley Quintet	Blue Note
1958?	Dick Hyman	Oh, Captain!	
1958	Jimmy Giuffre	The Music Man	Atlantic
1958	Mal Waldron	Mal/3: Sounds	Prestige
1958	Ben Webster	The Soul of Ben Webster	Verve
1958	Gerry Mulligan	The Jazz Combo from I Want to Live!	United Artists
1958	Prestige Blues-Swingers	Outskirts Of Town	Prestige
1958	Annie Ross and Gerry Mulligan	Annie Ross Sings a Song with Mulligan!	World Pacific
1958	Horace Silver	Further Explorations	Blue Note
1958	Hal McKusick	Cross Section – Saxes	Decca
1958	Sonny Clark	Cool Struttin'	Blue Note
1958	John Benson Brooks	Alabama Concerto	Riverside
1958	Milt Jackson	Bags' Opus	United Artists
1958	Michel Legrand	Legrand Jazz	Columbia
1958	Abbey Lincoln	It's Magic	Riverside
1958	Mundell Lowe	Porgy & Bess	RCA Camden
1958–59	Gerry Mulligan	What Is There to Say?	Columbia
1958–59	George Russell	New York, N.Y.	Decca
1958-59	Tony Ortega	Jazz for Young Moderns	Bethlehem
1959	Bill Potts	The Jazz Soul of Porgy & Bess	United Artists
1959	Carmen McRae	Something to Swing About	Kapp
1959	Jimmy Cleveland	Rhythm Crazy	EmArcy
1959	Quincy Jones	The Great Wide World of Quincy Jones	Mercury
1960	André Previn	The Subterraneans (Soundtrack)	MGM
1960–61	Benny Golson	Take a Number from 1 to 10	Argo
1963	Gerry Mulligan	Night Lights	Philips
1963	Gerry Mulligan	Butterfly with Hiccups	Limelight
1964	Sergio Mendes	Bossa Nova York	Elenco
1966	Chico O'Farrill	Nine Flags	Impulse!
1966	J. J. Johnson	The Total J.J. Johnson	RCA Victor
1966	Ray Bryant	Slow Freight	Cadet
1967	Benny Golson	Tune In, Turn On	Verve
1969	Kenny Clarke/Francy Boland Big Band	TNP	Delta Music
1969	Heikki Sarmanto	Many Moons – July '69	Louhi Productions
1969	Kenny Clarke/Francy Boland Big Band	Clarke Boland Big Band en Concert avec Europe 1	Tréma
1970	Kenny Clarke/Francy Boland Big Band with Carmen McRae	November Girl	Black Lion
1970	Kenny Clarke/Francy Boland Big Band	Off Limits	Polydor
1971	Kenny Clarke/Francy Boland Big Band and Stan Getz	Change of Scenes	Verve
1974	Peter Herbolzheimer	Scenes	MPS
1975	BP Convention Big Band	Blue Sunset	Jugoton
1976	Jim Hall	Commitment	A&M/Horizon
1976	(Various)	Jazz Gala Concert	Atlantic
1977	Yusef Lateef	Autophysiopsychic	CTI
1978	Duke Jordan	Duke's Artistry	SteepleChase
1979	Tommy Flanagan	Something Tasty	Baystate
1979	Ron Carter	New York Slick	Milestone
1980	Enrico Pieranunzi	Isis	Soul Note
1982	Ron Carter	Etudes	Elektra/Musician
1983	Joe Carter	My Foolish Heart	Empathy
1987	Bob Dorough	Songs of Love	
1987	Mark Murphy	September Ballads	Milestone
1987	Taina	Scene from a Trance	CBS
1987–88	Magni Wentzel	My Wonderful One	Gemini
1990	(Various)	Rhythmstick	CTI
1993	Barbara Carroll	This Heart of Mine	DRG
1996	Benny Golson	One Day, Forever	Arkadia Jazz
1996	Jim Hall	Panorama: Live at the Village Vanguard	Telarc

=== Singles as sideman ===
Year recorded	Leader	Title	Label
1948	Big Joe Turner	Radar Blues / Trouble Blues	Swing Time
1948	Big Joe Turner	Wine-O-Baby / B & O Blues	Swing Time
1948	Big Joe Turner	Christmas Date Boogie / Tell Me Pretty Baby	Swing Time
1948	Big Joe Turner	Old Piney Brown is Gone / Baby Won't You Marry Me	Swing Time
1949	Roy Porter	Little Wig / Gassin' The Wig	Savoy
1949	Roy Porter	Don't Blame Me	Rex Hollywood
1949	Roy Porter	Frantic Dream / Everything's Cool	Rex Hollywood
1952	Wardell Gray	April Skies / Bright Boy	Prestige
1952	Wardell Gray	Jackie / Sweet and Lovely	Prestige
1952	Wardell Gray	Farmer's Market / Lover Man	Prestige
1959	Teddy Charles	Air Mail Special / Flyin' Home	Bethlehem

== Filmography ==
Year recorded gives date of Farmer's appearance. An asterisk (*) indicates that the year is that of release.

Year recorded	Title	Notes
1958*	I Want to Live!	Hollywood film; Farmer appears as himself
1958	Jazz on a Summer's Day	Filmed at the Newport Jazz Festival; Farmer is part of the Gerry Mulligan band
1959	Gerry Mulligan & Art Farmer – Live in Rome 1959	With Bill Crow (bass), Dave Bailey (drums)
1960*	The Subterraneans	Hollywood film, based on the Jack Kerouac novella; Farmer appears as himself
1964	Ralph J. Gleason's Jazz Casual: Art Farmer	TV recording, later released on DVD
1981–1982	Jazz Masters Series: Art Farmer	At the Smithsonian Institution
1982*	Jazz in Exile	About American jazz musicians living in Europe
1986	Jacksonville Jazz Festival VI	TV broadcast of the Jacksonville Jazz Festival
1990	Ron Carter & Art Farmer: Live at Sweet Basil	With Cedar Walton and Billy Higgins
1992	The Creative Spirit	PBS broadcast
1994*	A Great Day in Harlem	About the 1958 photograph of 57 jazz musicians
1994	Jazz at Lincoln Center With Wynton Marsalis	PBS broadcast
2007*	Benny Golson: The Whisper Not Tour	Concert recordings of the Jazztet
