= The Time and the Place =

The Time and the Place may refer to:

- The Time and the Place (Art Farmer album), 1967
- The Time and the Place: The Lost Concert, an album by the Art Farmer Quintet, recorded in 1966 and released in 2011
- The Time and the Place (Jimmy Heath album), recorded in 1974 and released in 1994
- "The Time and the Place", a composition by Jimmy Heath appearing on all the above albums

== See also ==
- A Time and a Place, a 2010 box set by Emerson, Lake & Palmer
