= Perception (Art Farmer album) =

Studio album by Art Farmer
- Released: 1964
- Recorded: October 25, 26 & 27, 1961
- Studio: Nola Penthouse Studio, New York City
- Genre: Jazz
- Length: 33:57
- Label: Argo; LP-738
- Producer: Kay Norton

Art Farmer chronology
The Jazztet at Birdhouse (1961)	Perception (1964)	Here and Now (1962)

Professional ratings
Review scores
Source	Rating
AllMusic	4/5 stars

Perception is an album by flugelhorn player Art Farmer's Quartet, featuring performances recorded in 1961 and originally released on the Argo label.

== Background ==
This was Farmer's second album as leader for Argo, and the first recording on which he played only flugelhorn. The three other musicians were all part of the Jazztet, a sextet that Farmer co-led.

== Music and recording ==
"Punsu" (formerly "Pon-su") is a 32-bar composition in the form AABCB; "the B sections acting as four-bar tags to the main melody and the bridge". "The Day After" is a ballad that hints at modal influences. "Lullaby of the Leaves" has just Farmer and bassist Williams for the first chorus, while the flugelhorn joins the latter half of the choruses by bass and piano. "Kayin'" features strong playing by Williams and is an acknowledgement of the album's producer, Kay Norton.

== Reception ==
The AllMusic review stated, "This is a gorgeous record, full of light and airiness; it showcases the depth rather than the breadth of Farmer's contribution".

== Track listing ==
All compositions by Art Farmer except as indicated.

1. "Punsu" – 5:14
2. "The Day After" (Tom McIntosh) – 2:25
3. "Lullaby of the Leaves" (Bernice Petkere, Joe Young) – 4:18
4. "Kayin'" – 3:57
5. "Tonk" (Ray Bryant) – 4:37
6. "The Blue Room" (Lorenz Hart, Richard Rodgers) – 3:58
7. "Change Partners" (Irving Berlin) – 5:23
8. "Nobody's Heart" (Hart, Rodgers) – 4:05

== Personnel ==
- Art Farmer – flugelhorn
- Harold Mabern – piano
- Tommy Williams – bass
- Roy McCurdy – drums
