= Turning Point (Benny Golson album) =

Studio album by Benny Golson
- Released: 1962
- Recorded: October 30 & 31 and November 1, 1962; New York City
- Genre: Jazz
- Length: 34:07
- Label: Mercury; MG 20801
- Producer: Kay Norton

Benny Golson chronology
Another Git Together (1962)	Turning Point (1962)	Free (1962)

Turning Point is an album by saxophonist Benny Golson, featuring performances recorded in late 1962 and originally released on the Mercury label.

== Background ==
This was the first of a pair of quartet recordings by Golson in two months. Golson was displeased with his playing at the time: "I was frustrated, because I didn't know how I wanted to sound"; he soon stopped playing, and did not resume for seven or eight years. The title, according to Golson, "indicates my frustration with [producer] Kay Norton and Art [Farmer, co-leader of the Jazztet], because we had reached a point where we wanted to go in different directions."

== Reception ==
Professional ratings
Review scores
Source	Rating
Allmusic	3/5 stars
Down Beat	3.5/5 stars
The Rolling Stone Jazz Record Guide	4/5 stars

The Allmusic review states, "this quartet set for tenor saxophonist Benny Golson was the beginning of the close of an era. Within a year, Golson would be working full-time as a writer in the studios, and he de-emphasized his playing until making a comeback in the late 1970s".

== Track listing ==
All compositions by Benny Golson except as indicated

1. "How Am I to Know" (Dorothy Parker, Jack King) - 3:47
2. The Masquerade Is Over"" (Herbert Magidson, Allie Wrubel) - 4:38
3. "Dear Kathy" - 4:48
4. "Three Little Words" (Harry Ruby, Bert Kalmar) - 4:38
5. "Turning Point" - 3:56
6. "Stella by Starlight" (Victor Young, Ned Washington) - 4:50
7. "Alone Together" (Arthur Schwartz, Howard Dietz) - 7:30
- Recorded in New York City on October 30 (tracks 4, 5 & 7), October 31 (tracks 2 & 6) and November 1 (tracks 1 & 3), 1962

== Personnel ==
- Benny Golson - tenor saxophone
- Wynton Kelly - piano
- Paul Chambers - bass
- Jimmy Cobb - drums
