= Really Big! =

Studio album by Jimmy Heath
- Released: 1960
- Recorded: June 24 & 28, 1960; New York City
- Studio: Plaza Sound Studios
- Genre: Jazz
- Length: 35:53
- Label: Riverside; RLP 333
- Producer: Orrin Keepnews

Jimmy Heath chronology
The Thumper (1959)	Really Big! (1960)	The Quota (1961)

Really Big! is the second album by saxophonist Jimmy Heath featuring big band performances recorded in 1960 and originally released on the Riverside label.

== Reception ==
Professional ratings
Review scores
Source	Rating
Allmusic	4.5/5 stars
The Penguin Guide to Jazz Recordings	3.5/4 stars

Scott Yanow of Allmusic says, "Jimmy Heath's first chance to lead a fairly large group, an all-star ten-piece, found him well featured both on tenor and as an arranger/composer... A well-conceived set".

== Track listing ==
All compositions by Jimmy Heath except as indicated

1. Big "P" - 3:53
2. Old Fashioned Fun - 4:34
3. Mona's Mood - 4:53
4. Dat Dere (Bobby Timmons) - 4:24
5. Nails - 4:47
6. On Green Dolphin Street (Bronisław Kaper, Ned Washington) - 4:42
7. My Ideal (Richard A. Whiting, Newell Chase, Leo Robin) - 4:10
8. Picture of Heath - 4:30

== Personnel ==
- Jimmy Heath - tenor saxophone
- Nat Adderley - cornet
- Clark Terry - flugelhorn, trumpet
- Tom McIntosh - trombone
- Dick Berg - French horn
- Cannonball Adderley - alto saxophone
- Pat Patrick - baritone saxophone
- Tommy Flanagan - piano
- Cedar Walton - piano
- Percy Heath - bass
- Albert Heath - drums
- Orrin Keepnews - producer
- Ray Fowler - engineer
