= The Many Faces of Art Farmer =

Studio album by Art Farmer
- Released: 1964
- Recorded: 1964; New York City
- Genre: Jazz
- Label: Scepter; SRM/SPS-521

Art Farmer chronology
To Sweden with Love (1964)	The Many Faces of Art Farmer (1964)	Sing Me Softly of the Blues (1965)

The Many Faces of Art Farmer is an album by Art Farmer recorded in 1964 and originally released on the Scepter label.

== Reception ==
The Allmusic review awarded the album two stars.

Professional ratings
Review scores
Source	Rating
Allmusic	2/5 stars
The Penguin Guide to Jazz Recordings	4/4 stars

== Track listing ==
1. "Happy Feet" (Tom McIntosh) - 4:39
2. "Hyacinth" (Dennis Sandole) - 5:00
3. "Ally" (McIntosh) - 6:46
4. "Minuet in G" (McIntosh) - 5:00
5. "All About Art" (Sergio Mihanovich) - 4:41
6. "People" (Jule Styne, Bob Merrill) - 5:15
7. "Saucer Eyes" (Randy Weston) - 4:48

== Personnel ==
- Art Farmer - flugelhorn
- Charles McPherson - alto saxophone
- Tommy Flanagan - piano
- Ron Carter (tracks 2, 4 & 7), Steve Swallow (tracks 1, 3, 5 & 6) - bass
- Bobby Thomas - drums
