= Voices All =

Studio album by The Jazztet
- Released: 1983
- Recorded: April 24–25, 1982
- Studio: CBS/Sony Studios, Tokyo, Japan
- Genre: Jazz
- Label: Eastworld; EWJ 90016
- Producer: Kiyoshi Hitoh

The Jazztet chronology
Another Git Together (1962)	Voices All (1983)	Moment to Moment (1983)

Voices All is an album by Art Farmer and Benny Golson's group, The Jazztet recorded in Tokyo in 1983 and originally released on the Japanese Eastworld label.

== Reception ==
Professional ratings
Review scores
Source	Rating
Allmusic	3/5 stars

Allmusic awarded the album 3 stars.

== Track listing ==
All compositions by Benny Golson except as indicated

1. "Whisper Not" - 6:12
2. "Voices All" - 7:48
3. "Killer Joe" - 7:43
4. "Mox Nix" (Art Farmer) - 6:15
5. "I Remember Clifford" - 5:31
6. "Evermore" - 6:43
7. "Park Avenue Petite" - 4:29

== Personnel ==
- Art Farmer - flugelhorn, trumpet
- Benny Golson - tenor saxophone
- Curtis Fuller - trombone
- Cedar Walton - piano
- Buster Williams - bass
- Albert Heath - drums
