= Free (Benny Golson album) =

Studio album by Benny Golson
- Released: 1963
- Recorded: December 26, 1962
- Studio: Van Gelder Studio, Englewood Cliffs, New Jersey
- Genre: Jazz
- Length: 38:00
- Label: Argo; LP 716
- Producer: Esmond Edwards

Benny Golson chronology
Turning Point (1962)	Free (1963)	The Roland Kirk Quartet Meets the Benny Golson Orchestra (1963)

Free is an album by saxophonist Benny Golson recorded in late 1962 and originally released on the Argo label.

== Background ==
Pianist Tommy Flanagan had played with Golson before; bassist Ron Carter was selected to provide a different approach for the leader; and drummer Art Taylor was a replacement for Philly Joe Jones, who was due to play, but did not go to the studio.

== Reception ==
In the November 7, 1963 issue of Down Beat magazine, critic Harvey Pekar awarded the album 5 stars and said that "Golson's improvising is outstanding; I doubt that he's ever before played as consistently well on record."

The Allmusic review states, "Golson's last album as a leader in which he plays in his Don Byas/Lucky Thompson style (he would soon become a fulltime arranger and; by the time he led his next playing date in 1977, Golson's sound was quite a bit different) finds him in top form." Writing in 2004, critic Bob Blumenthal commented that the album "remains among the highlights of his recording career."

Professional ratings
Review scores
Source	Rating
Down Beat	5/5 stars
Allmusic	4.5/5 stars

== Track listing ==
All compositions by Benny Golson except as indicated

1. "Sock Cha Cha" (Will Davis) – 7:10
2. "Mad About the Boy" (Noël Coward) – 7:15
3. "Just by Myself" – 5:45
4. "Shades of Stein" – 4:30
5. "My Romance" (Lorenz Hart, Richard Rodgers) – 7:30
6. "Just in Time" (Betty Comden, Adolph Green, Jule Styne) – 5:55

== Personnel ==
=== Musicians ===
- Benny Golson – tenor saxophone
- Tommy Flanagan – piano
- Ron Carter – bass
- Art Taylor – drums

=== Production ===
- Esmond Edwards – production
- Rudy Van Gelder – recording engineering
