= Art (album) =

Studio album by Art Farmer
- Released: 1961
- Recorded: September 21, 22 & 23, 1960; Nola Penthouse Studio, New York City
- Genre: Jazz
- Length: 39:02
- Label: Argo; LP-678
- Producer: Kay Norton

Art Farmer chronology
Big City Sounds (1960)	Art (1961)	The Jazztet and John Lewis (1961)

Art is an album by trumpeter Art Farmer, featuring performances recorded in 1960 and originally released on the Argo label. Farmer stated in 1995 that the album, which consists mainly of ballads, was his favorite.

== Background ==
Farmer was co-founder and co-leader of the Jazztet, which had recorded two albums for Argo, including Big City Sounds on September 16, 19, and 20, 1960. Two of the members of that sextet – bassist Tommy Williams, and drummer Albert Heath – were retained by Farmer for his recording as leader, and pianist Tommy Flanagan was added, completing the quartet.

== Recording and music ==
The album was recorded immediately after the Big City Sounds sessions – on September 21–23, 1960. The band did not rehearse the music before recording it.

The music chosen had an "emphasis on less frequently played ballads." "So Beats My Heart for You" features two solos by Williams. "Goodbye, Old Girl", from the musical Damn Yankees, is played with a "mood of rueful farewell". The Gershwins' "Who Cares?" and Irving Berlin's "The Best Thing for You (Would Be Me)" are up-tempo numbers. Benny Golson's "Out of the Past" was intended to sound like a standard, and was first recorded in 1957. The playing on "Younger Than Springtime" is "impressionistic" and "reflective". "I'm a Fool to Want You" was described by Nat Hentoff in the original liner notes as "the essence of jazz lyricism – intimacy without self-pity". "That Ole Devil Called Love" has solos from Farmer and Williams.

== Reception ==
Professional ratings
Review scores
Source	Rating
Allmusic	4.5/5 stars
The Penguin Guide to Jazz	4/4 stars

The Allmusic review stated "This series of studio sessions from 1960 [...] find the trumpeter in great form". The Penguin Guide to Jazz described the album as "close to perfect, [...] measured, unflashy but deeply felt".

Speaking in 1995, Farmer stated that Art was his favorite album: "Sometimes things gel, and sometimes things that should gel don't, and nobody can really anticipate it. Sometimes it works, sometimes it doesn't work. In this case, it worked."

== Track listing ==
1. "So Beats My Heart for You" (Pat Ballard, Charles E. Henderson, Tom Waring) – 4:38
2. "Goodbye Old Girl" (Richard Adler Jerry Ross) – 4:24
3. "Who Cares?" (George Gershwin, Ira Gershwin) – 5:15
4. "Out of the Past" (Benny Golson) – 5:20
5. "Younger Than Springtime" (Oscar Hammerstein II, Richard Rodgers) – 5:38
6. "The Best Thing for You (Would Be Me)" (Irving Berlin) – 4:06
7. "I'm a Fool to Want You" (Joel Herron, Frank Sinatra, Jack Wolf) – 5:27
8. "That Ole Devil Called Love" (Doris Fisher, Allan Roberts) – 4:14

== Personnel ==
=== Musicians ===
- Art Farmer – trumpet
- Tommy Flanagan – piano
- Tommy Williams – bass
- Albert Heath – drums

=== Production ===
- Kay Norton – production
- Tommy Nola – recording engineering
- Ernest Fiene – cover art
- Nat Hentoff – liner notes
