= Take a Number from 1 to 10 =

Studio album by Benny Golson
- Released: 1961
- Recorded: December 13 & 14, 1960 and April 11, 1961; Nola's Penthouse Sound Studio, New York City
- Genre: Jazz
- Length: 41:55
- Label: Argo; LP 684
- Producer: Kay Norton

Benny Golson chronology
Big City Sounds (1960)	Take a Number from 1 to 10 (1961)	The Jazztet and John Lewis (1961)

Take a Number from 1 to 10 is an album by saxophonist Benny Golson, featuring performances recorded in late 1960 and early 1961 and originally released on the Argo label.

== Background ==
This was Golson's first recording as leader for Argo. The concept for the album was that of producer Kay Norton. The album begins with a track of solo saxophone by Golson, then adds one musician for each of the remaining tracks, finishing with ten performers on the final song.

== Recording and music ==
The first seven tracks were recorded on December 13 and 14, 1960. Golson begins on tenor saxophone with one chorus of "You're My Thrill". "My Heart Belongs to Daddy" adds bassist Tommy Williams, who maintains the tempo while "matching Golson's intensity". Drummer Albert Heath is added for a trio version of "The Best Thing for You Is Me"; then pianist Cedar Walton joins, becoming the fourth member of the Golson-Art Farmer-led band the Jazztet playing, for "Impromptune". Trumpeter Freddie Hubbard plays on the medium tempo "Little Karin", which was named after Norton's daughter. "Swing It" is a fast blues with Curtis Fuller on trombone added; the sextet with Fuller, Hubbard, and Walton presaged the 1961 version of Art Blakey's Jazz Messengers. Golson is the main soloist for the ballad "I Fall in Love Too Easily", which has Sahib Shihab added on baritone saxophone.

The personnel changed considerably for the final three tracks, recorded on April 11, 1961. The octet that plays "Out of This World" consists of baritone saxophone, two tenor saxophones, trumpet, trombone, French horn, bass, and drums; they form rhythms that allow Golson to flow in and out of the harmonic structure of the composition. A second trumpet is added for "The Touch"; and another, Farmer, completes the tentet for "Time".

== Reception ==
Professional ratings
Review scores
Source	Rating
Allmusic	4/5 stars

The Allmusic review describes the album as "A gimmick record that transcends its novelty trappings [...] While the progressive sonic expansion is fascinating to behold, the small-group settings are no less impressive for their intimacy and nuance".

== Track listing ==
All compositions by Benny Golson except as indicated

1. "You're My Thrill" (Burton Lane, Ned Washington) – 1:36
2. "My Heart Belongs to Daddy" (Cole Porter) – 4:11
3. "The Best Thing for You Is Me" (Clifford Brown, Buddy DeSylva, Ray Henderson) – 2:49
4. "Impromptune" – 3:03
5. "Little Karin" – 3:36
6. "Swing It" – 4:26
7. "I Fall in Love Too Easily" (Sammy Cahn, Jule Styne) – 4:47
8. "Out of This World" (Harold Arlen, Johnny Mercer) – 3:54
9. "The Touch" – 5:16
10. "Time" – 3:35
- Recorded at Nola's Penthouse Sound Studio in New York City on December 13, 1960 (tracks 1–4), December 14, 1960 (tracks 5–7) and April 11, 1961 (tracks 8–10)

== Personnel ==
=== Musicians ===
- Benny Golson – tenor saxophone
- Art Farmer (track 10), Bernie Glow (tracks 9 & 10), Freddie Hubbard (tracks 5–7), Nick Travis (tracks 8–10) – trumpet
- Willie Ruff – French horn (tracks 8–10)
- Bill Elton (tracks 8–10), Curtis Fuller (tracks 6 & 7) – trombone
- Hal McKusick – alto saxophone (tracks 8–10)
- Sol Schlinger (tracks 8–10), Sahib Shihab (track 7) – baritone saxophone
- Cedar Walton – piano (tracks 4–7)
- Tommy Williams – bass (tracks 2–10)
- Albert Heath – drums (tracks 3–10)

=== Production ===
- Kay Norton – production
- Tommy Nola – recording engineering
