= Pop + Jazz = Swing =

Studio album by Benny Golson
- Released: 1962
- Recorded: April 1962; New York City
- Genre: Jazz
- Length: 37:41
- Label: Audio Fidelity; AFLP 1978
- Producer: Tom Wilson

Benny Golson chronology
Here and Now (1962)	Pop + Jazz = Swing (1962)	Another Git Together (1962)

Just Jazz! Cover

Professional ratings
Review scores
Source	Rating
Allmusic	3/5 stars

Pop + Jazz = Swing is an album arranged and conducted by Benny Golson featuring performances recorded in 1962 and originally released on the Audio Fidelity label. Record producer Tom Wilson was involved in the sessions and wrote the album's liner notes. The album utilised stereophonic sound to present a jazz group on the right channel and an 11-piece pop orchestra playing the same song or a related tune on the left channel which could be separated or mixed by the listener. The related jazz tunes are contrafacts or borrowed chord progressions where new melodies are overlaid on an existing harmonic structure.

The jazz tunes were later released as Just Jazz! and both albums were combined on a CD reissue on the Jazz Beat label. The recording of "Walkin'" is the last released recording of the famed rhythm section of Bill Evans, Paul Chambers, and Jimmy Cobb.

== Track listing ==
1. Left Channel: "You're Driving Me Crazy" (Walter Donaldson) / Right Channel: "Moten Swing" (Bennie Moten) – 4:14
2. "Out of Nowhere" (Johnny Green, Edward Heyman) – 4:16
3. Left Channel: "Whispering" (John Schoenberger, Richard Coburn, Vincent Rose) / Right Channel: "Groovin' High" (Dizzy Gillespie) – 3:14
4. "Autumn Leaves" (Joseph Kosma, Jacques Prévert, Johnny Mercer) – 4:39
5. Left Channel: "Indiana" (Ballard MacDonald, James F. Hanley) / Right Channel: "Donna Lee" (Charlie Parker) – 2:44
6. Left Channel: "Lover, Come Back to Me" (Sigmund Romberg, Oscar Hammerstein II) / Right Channel: "Quicksilver" (Horace Silver) – 3:52
7. "Stella by Starlight" (Victor Young, Ned Washington) – 4:20
8. Left Channel: "How High the Moon" (Nancy Hamilton, Morgan Lewis) / Right Channel: "Ornithology" (Charlie Parker) – 3:43
9. "If I Should Lose You" (Ralph Rainger, Leo Robin) – 3:00
10. Left Channel: "St. Louis Blues" (W. C. Handy) / Right Channel: "Walkin'" (Richard Carpenter) – 3:39

== Personnel ==
- Benny Golson – arranger, conductor
- Bill Evans – piano
- Ron Carter (tracks 1–9), Paul Chambers (track 10) – bass
- Charlie Persip (tracks 1–9), Jimmy Cobb (track 10) – drums

Jazz Band – Right Channel

- Freddie Hubbard (tracks 1, 2, 4, 6, 7 & 10), Bill Hardman (tracks 3, 5, 8 & 9) – trumpet
- Curtis Fuller (tracks 1, 2, 4, 6, 7 & 10), Grachan Moncur III (tracks 3, 5, 8 & 9) – trombone
- Eric Dolphy – alto saxophone (tracks 3, 5, 6, 8 & 9)
- Wayne Shorter (tracks 1, 2, 4, 7 & 10) – tenor saxophone

Pop Orchestra – Left Channel

- Ray Alonge, Bob Northern – French horn
- Jerome Richardson – flute
- Danny Bank – flute, baritone saxophone
- Lou Cranston – tenor saxophone
- Julius Held, Harry Lookofsky, George Ockner, Gene Orloff – violin
- Harold Goletta – viola
- Charles McCracken – cello
