= Kwanza (The First) =

Studio album by Albert Heath
- Released: 1973
- Recorded: June 14, 1973
- Studio: RCA Studios, New York City
- Genre: Jazz
- Length: 44:22
- Label: Muse; MR 5031
- Producer: Don Schlitten

Albert Heath chronology
Kawaida (1969)	Kwanza (The First) (1973)	Live at Smalls (2009)

Kwanza (The First) is an album by drummer Albert Heath featuring performances recorded in 1973 and originally released on the Muse label.

== Reception ==
Andrew Gilbert of KQED says, "Kwanza captures a mid-career master with a long-established reputation as one of the most eloquent and adaptable drummers in jazz ... Heath wasn’t content to organize an all-star jam session. He’d been collaborating and studying composition with multi-instrumental explorer Yusef Lateef, and he used Kwanza to investigate some of the chamber music concepts he’d been working on". Jazz Views' Eddie Myer observed, "This album come replete with all kinds of modish innovations, from Swahili titles to 4/4 straight-8 rock rhythms, to guitar and rhodes from the youngest members".

== Track listing ==
All compositions by Albert Heath, except Oops! by Percy Heath.

1. "Tafadhali" – 6:56
2. "A Notion" – 5:29
3. "Dr. JEH" – 6:22
4. "Dunia" – 4:01
5. "Oops!" – 6:33
6. "Sub-Set" – 10:11

== Personnel ==
- Albert Heath – drums, chimes, timpani
- Curtis Fuller – trombone
- Jimmy Heath – tenor saxophone, soprano saxophone, flute
- Kenny Barron – piano, electric piano
- Ted Dunbar – guitar
- Percy Heath – bass
