= Tommy Williams (musician) =

American jazz double bassist

Tommy Williams was an American jazz double bassist. He played with Art Farmer, Benny Golson, Stan Getz and others before he stopped playing in the 1960s. His last recording from that period was in 1965. He returned to playing years later, but, according to Golson, "died before he could reestablish himself." He played in the Jazztet, where, Golson reported, "I hated to follow [Williams'] bass solos [...] because he could put horn players to shame." He also played alto saxophone, piano, and vibraphone, but, according to pianist Ronnie Matthews, "Bass is what everybody wanted him for because that was the thing that would make your hair stand on end when you heard him play it." In February 1965 Williams played in the Quincy Jones orchestra for the soundtrack to the film The Pawnbroker.

Accounts of why he left music vary. Golson reported that Williams worked in a hardware store after his wife forced him to stop playing; pianist Ronnie Matthews suggested that "he was the kind of person who for whatever reason could never deal with the bullshit business part of the music business. [...] one morning when he was coming home from work with his bass, he got mugged. He just stopped playing and went to work for Sears Roebuck."

Williams latterly lived in Dean Street, Brooklyn, New York, with his wife, Audrey.

== Discography ==
=== As sideman ===
Year recorded	Leader	Title	Label
1958	Gene Rodgers	Introducing the Gene Rodgers Trio	Mercury
1959	Carmen McRae	Something to Swing About	Kapp
1959	Billy Taylor	Billy Taylor with Four Flutes	Riverside
1960	Art Farmer	Art	Argo
1960	The Jazztet	Big City Sounds	Argo
1960	Kai Winding and J. J. Johnson	The Great Kai & J. J.	Impulse!
1960–61	The Jazztet	The Jazztet and John Lewis	Argo
1960–61	Benny Golson	Take a Number from 1 to 10	Argo
1960–61	Blue Mitchell	Smooth as the Wind	Riverside
1961	Art Farmer	Perception	Argo
1960	The Jazztet	The Jazztet at Birdhouse	Argo
1962	Stan Getz	Big Band Bossa Nova	Verve
1963	Stan Getz and Luiz Bonfá	Jazz Samba Encore!	Verve
1965	Quincy Jones	The Pawnbroker [soundtrack]	Mercury
