= Warm Valley =

Studio album by Art Farmer
- Released: 1983
- Recorded: September 1982
- Studio: Soundmixers, NYC
- Genre: Jazz
- Length: 39:04
- Label: Concord; CJ 212
- Producer: Carl Jefferson

Art Farmer chronology
Mirage (1982)	Warm Valley (1983)	Moment to Moment (1983)

Warm Valley is an album by American jazz trumpeter Art Farmer recorded in New York in 1982 and originally released on the Concord label.

== Reception ==
Professional ratings
Review scores
Source	Rating
Allmusic	3.5/5 stars
The Rolling Stone Jazz Record Guide	3/5 stars

Scott Yanow of Allmusic said: "The second of flugelhornist Art Farmer's two Concord albums is the equal of his first... Art Farmer is heard in prime form, playing in his appealing lyrical bop style".

== Track listing ==
1. "Moose the Mooche" (Charlie Parker) - 4:31
2. "And Now There's You" (Fred Hersch) - 5:09
3. "Three Little Words" (Bert Kalmar, Harry Ruby) - 4:49
4. "Eclypso" (Tommy Flanagan) - 5:28
5. "Sad to Say" (Benny Golson) - 5:34
6. "Upper Manhattan Medical Group" (Billy Strayhorn) - 5:41
7. "Warm Valley" (Duke Ellington) - 7:52

== Personnel ==
- Art Farmer - flugelhorn
- Fred Hersch - piano
- Ray Drummond - bass
- Akira Tana - drums
