= Interaction (album) =

Studio album by Art Farmer Quartet featuring Jim Hall
- Released: 1963
- Recorded: July 25 & 29 and August 1, 1963; New York City
- Genre: Jazz
- Length: 39:44
- Labels: Atlantic; SD 1412
- Producer: Nesuhi Ertegun

Art Farmer chronology
Listen to Art Farmer and the Orchestra (1962)	Interaction (1963)	Live at the Half-Note (1963)

Jim Hall chronology
Undercurrent (1962)	Interaction (1963)	Live at the Half-Note (1963)

Interaction is an album by Art Farmer's Quartet featuring guitarist Jim Hall. It was recorded in 1963 and originally released on the Atlantic label. The original LP release had six tracks, including the then-new Richard Rodgers song "Loads of Love", and an early recording of the then 26-year-old Argentinian composer Sergio Mihanovich's "Sometime Ago". An additional track from the sessions, "My Kinda Love", was included on the Argentinian LP release (in the place of "Loads of Love"), and later added as a bonus track to some CD reissues.

Professional ratings
Review scores
Source	Rating
Down Beat	5/5 stars
Allmusic	3/5 stars
Record Mirror	3/5 stars
The Rolling Stone Jazz Record Guide	4/5 stars

== Track listing ==
=== 1963 U.S. Atlantic LP ===
1. "Days of Wine and Roses" (Henry Mancini, Johnny Mercer) - 6:49
2. "By Myself" (Howard Dietz, Arthur Schwartz) - 7:11
3. "My Little Suede Shoes" (Charlie Parker) - 5:02
4. "Embraceable You" (George Gershwin, Ira Gershwin) - 7:02
5. "Loads of Love" (Richard Rodgers) - 4:58
6. "Sometime Ago" (Sergio Mihanovich) - 6:26

=== CD reissue bonus track ===
- "My Kinda Love" (Louis Alter, Jo Trent) - 7:14

== Personnel ==
- Art Farmer - flugelhorn
- Jim Hall - guitar
- Steve Swallow - bass
- Walter Perkins - drums
