= Listen to Art Farmer and the Orchestra =

Studio album by Art Farmer
- Released: 1963
- Recorded: August 10 and September 5 & 20, 1962; Webster Hall, New York City
- Genre: Jazz
- Length: 34:33
- Label: Mercury; MG 20766

Art Farmer chronology
Another Git Together (1962)	Listen to Art Farmer and the Orchestra (1963)	Interaction (1963)

Professional ratings
Review scores
Source	Rating
Down Beat (Original LP release)	5/5 stars
Allmusic	4.5/5 stars
The Rolling Stone Jazz Record Guide	3/5 stars

Listen to Art Farmer and the Orchestra is an album by trumpeter Art Farmer featuring performances recorded in 1962 and originally released on the Mercury label.

== Reception ==
The Allmusic review stated "Oliver Nelson's arrangements provide great backdrops for the leader, as do the mix of dependable studio musicians and outstanding jazzmen assembled for the three sessions".

== Track listing ==
1. "Street of Dreams" (Sam M. Lewis, Victor Young) - 4:18
2. "Rain Check" (Billy Strayhorn) - 3:40
3. "Rue Prevail" (Art Farmer) - 4:08
4. "The Sweetest Sounds" (Richard Rodgers) - 4:38
5. "My Romance" (Lorenz Hart, Rodgers) - 4:57
6. "Fly Me to the Moon" (Bart Howard) - 2:53
7. "Naima" (John Coltrane) - 5:21
8. "Ruby" (Mitchell Parish, Heinz Roemheld) - 4:38
- Recorded at Webster Hall in New York City on August 10 (track 5), September 5 (tracks 1–3) and September 20 (tracks 4 & 6–8), 1962

== Personnel ==
- Art Farmer - flugelhorn
- Ray Copeland, Rolf Ericson, Bernie Glow, Ernie Royal, Paul Serrano, Clark Terry, Snooky Young - trumpet
- Jimmy Cleveland, Urbie Green, Tommy Mitchell - trombone
- Paul Faulise, Tony Studd - bass trombone
- Ray Alonge, Jim Buffington, Bob Northern - French horn
- Danny Bank, Ray Beckenstein, Phil Bodner, Walt Levinsky, Romeo Penque, Stan Webb, Phil Woods - reeds
- Tommy Flanagan - piano
- Barry Galbraith, Jim Hall - guitar
- George Duvivier - bass
- Charlie Persip - drums
- Ray Barretto, Willie Rodriguez - percussion
- Oliver Nelson - arranger, conductor
