= Meet the Jazztet =

Studio album by Art Farmer and Benny Golson
- Released: 1960
- Recorded: February 6, 9 & 10, 1960
- Studio: Nola Penthouse Studios, New York City
- Genre: Jazz
- Length: 39:56
- Label: Argo; LP 664
- Producer: Kay Norton

Art Farmer chronology
The Aztec Suite (1959)	Meet the Jazztet (1960)	Big City Sounds (1960)

Benny Golson chronology
Gettin' with It (1959)	Meet the Jazztet (1960)	Big City Sounds (1960)

Meet the Jazztet is an album by the Jazztet, led by trumpeter Art Farmer and saxophonist Benny Golson featuring performances recorded in 1960 and originally released on the Argo label.

== Background ==
Meet the Jazztet was the debut recording of the Jazztet, a sextet co-led by Art Farmer and Benny Golson. The band had first performed in public in November 1959; the original drummer was Dave Bailey, but he was replaced by Lex Humphries prior to the recording sessions.

== Recording ==
The album's ten tracks were recorded for Argo Records at Nola Penthouse Studios over three days: February 6, 9, and 10, 1960. Argo knew the commercial value of having successful jazz singles; this may have influenced the length of the tracks on the album, only one of which exceeds five minutes.

The Jazztet consisted of Farmer (trumpet), Golson (tenor saxophone), Curtis Fuller (trombone), McCoy Tyner (piano), Addison Farmer (bass), and Humphries (drums).

== Music ==
"Serenata" has a chord structure that suits improvisation; Golson added an introduction and "a hard 6/8 groove on the theme chorus". Golson and Farmer each have a two-chorus solo. "It Ain't Necessarily So" is from Porgy and Bess, which had gained recent attention from the 1959 film version. The version recorded is at a medium tempo. "Avalon" is taken at a higher tempo, and features solos from piano, trombone, trumpet, and saxophone, all before the full melody is played. Golson's ballad "I Remember Clifford" is a feature for Farmer; he had already recorded it twice, but this version, in the words of Bob Blumenthal, is a "heartbreaking reading. The balance Farmer achieves between fealty to the melody and sympathetic variation make this [...] definitive." "Blues March" was also written by Golson, and first recorded two years before this version, which contains some double-timing from Farmer. "It's All Right With Me" is chiefly a feature for Fuller. "Park Avenue Petite" is a ballad written by Golson. "Mox Nix" is an up-tempo blues by Farmer. "Easy Living" features Golson's ballad playing, which was influenced by Lucky Thompson and Ben Webster. "Killer Joe" is "lean and mean, with Farmer's muted horn in the lead and horns blowing softly over a bridge where the rhythm is suspended".

== Reception ==
Professional ratings
Review scores
Source	Rating
Allmusic	5/5 stars
New Record Mirror	3/5 stars

In August 1960, the album was reported as having good sales, and a single from it, "Killer Joe", with "Mox Nix" on the B side, had reportedly sold over 40,000 copies. Scott Yanow of Allmusic calls the album "a hard bop classic".

The album's final track, "Killer Joe", helped the Jazztet gain attention, in Golson's opinion.

== Track listing ==
All compositions by Benny Golson except as indicated

1. "Serenata" (Leroy Anderson, Mitchell Parish) – 3:30
2. "It Ain't Necessarily So" (George Gershwin, Ira Gershwin) – 4:26
3. "Avalon" (Buddy DeSylva, Al Jolson, Vincent Rose) – 3:29
4. "I Remember Clifford" – 3:10
5. "Blues March" – 5:16
6. "It's All Right with Me" (Cole Porter) – 3:53
7. "Park Avenue Petite" – 3:41
8. "Mox Nix" (Art Farmer) – 4:01
9. "Easy Living" (Ralph Rainger, Leo Robin) – 3:33
10. "Killer Joe" – 4:57

== Personnel ==
=== Musicians ===
- Art Farmer – trumpet
- Benny Golson – tenor saxophone
- Curtis Fuller – trombone
- McCoy Tyner – piano
- Addison Farmer – bass
- Lex Humphries – drums

=== Production ===
- Kay Norton – production
- Tommy Nola – recording engineering
