= Baroque Sketches =

Studio album by Art Farmer and the Baroque Orchestra
- Released: 1967
- Recorded: September 13 & 15, 1966
- Genre: Jazz
- Label: Columbia
- Producer: Teo Macero

Art Farmer chronology
| The Time and the Place: The Lost Concert (1966) | Baroque Sketches (1967) | The Time and the Place (1967) |

Baroque Sketches is an album by trumpeter Art Farmer featuring performances recorded in 1966 and released on the Columbia label in 1967.

== Reception ==
Professional ratings
Review scores
| Source | Rating |
|---|---|
| Penguin Guide to Jazz | 3/4 stars |
| Allmusic | 3/5 stars |

The Penguin Guide to Jazz stated: "Baroque Sketches is a mix of genuine and pastiche baroque (from Bach to John Lewis) helped up with what amount to boogaloo rhythms. Benny Golson was smart enough to make the charts straddle kitsch and a more proper jazz feeling and Farmer, the consummate pro, plays seriously enough".

The Allmusic review said: "Art Farmer enjoyed playing pieces with strong melodies, and the original concept of Baroque Sketches was to adapt the music of Johann Sebastian Bach into a jazz setting. After initial research, it was decided to also include works by Chopin and Albeniz, as well as John Lewis' "Little David's Fugue" and Sonny Rollins' "Alfie Theme." With arrangements by his former Jazztet partner Benny Golson, Farmer creates music that is entertaining, though unlikely to stand up to repeated listening".

== Track listing ==
1. "Fuja XI" (Johann Sebastian Bach) - 3:01
2. "Aria" (Bach) - 3:56
3. "Little David's Fuge" (John Lewis) - 2:37
4. "Prelude in E Minor" (Frédéric Chopin) - 2:58
5. "Sinfonia" (Bach) - 2:26
6. "Zortzico" (Isaac Albéniz) - 2:17
7. "Alfie's Theme" (Sonny Rollins) - 2:03
8. "Jesu" (Bach) - 3:34
9. "Etude" (Chopin) - 3:25
10. "Prelude in A Minor" (Chopin) - 2:55
11. "Rhythm of Life" (Cy Coleman, Dorothy Fields) - 2:43

== Personnel ==
- Art Farmer - flugelhorn
- Don Butterfield - tuba
- Ted Gompers, Romeo Penque - reeds
- George Duvivier – bass
- Don Lamond - drums
- Phil Kraus percussion
- Benny Golson - arranger
- Unknown musicians - trumpet, flugelhorn, trombone, French horn, harp
