= Live at the Half-Note =

Live album by Art Farmer Quartet featuring Jim Hall
- Released: 1964
- Recorded: December 5, 6 & 7, 1963
- Venue: Half Note Club, New York City
- Genre: Jazz
- Length: 37:26
- Label: Atlantic; SD 1421
- Producer: Arif Mardin

Art Farmer chronology
| Interaction (1962) | Live at the Half-Note (1964) | To Sweden with Love (1964) |

Jim Hall chronology
| Interaction (1962) | Live at the Half-Note (1963) | To Sweden with Love (1964) |

Live at the Half-Note is an album by Art Farmer's Quartet featuring guitarist Jim Hall recorded in 1963 at the Half Note Club and released on the Atlantic label.

== Reception ==
Professional ratings
Review scores
| Source | Rating |
|---|---|
| Allmusic | 4.5/5 stars |

The Allmusic review by Scott Yanow states, "Hall was a perfect musical partner for Farmer since both musicians have mellow sounds and thoughtful improvising styles that are more complex than expected".

== Track listing ==
1. "Stompin' at the Savoy" (Benny Goodman, Andy Razaf, Edgar Sampson, Chick Webb) - 12:27
2. "Swing Spring" (Miles Davis) - 5:51
3. "What's New?" (Johnny Burke, Bob Haggart) - 4:24
4. "I Want to Be Happy" (Irving Caesar, Vincent Youmans) - 9:41
5. "I'm Gettin' Sentimental Over You" (George Bassman, Ned Washington) - 5:03

== Personnel ==
- Art Farmer - flugelhorn
- Jim Hall - guitar
- Steve Swallow - bass
- Walter Perkins - drums
