= To Sweden with Love =

Studio album by Art Farmer Quartet featuring Jim Hall
- Released: 1964
- Recorded: April 28 & 30, 1964; Stockholm, Sweden
- Genre: Jazz
- Length: 32:41
- Label: Atlantic; SD 1430
- Producer: Anders Burman

Art Farmer chronology
Live at the Half-Note (1963)	To Sweden with Love (1964)	The Many Faces of Art Farmer (1964)

Jim Hall chronology
Live at the Half-Note (1963)	To Sweden with Love (1964)	Intermodulation (1966)

To Sweden with Love is an album of Swedish folk music by Art Farmer's Quartet featuring guitarist Jim Hall recorded in Stockholm in 1964 and originally released on the Atlantic label.

== Background and recording ==
Farmer's account was that his band was touring in Sweden not long after the Swedish pianist Jan Johansson had had a commercially successful recording of Swedish folk songs; a record company official "comes to me and says, 'How about you guys do an album of Swedish folk songs?' I said, 'We don't know any Swedish folk songs.' [...] He said, 'Okay, I’ll get the music'". The band flicked through the book of songs that the man bought for them and selected some to play at the recording session that had been arranged. One of them, Farmer said, was ""Sw. Folk Song", and so we thought that meant Swedish. [...] We're in the studio, and we had never seen the music before. The guy runs out and says, 'Hey, stop, stop!' I said, 'What's the matter?' He says, 'That's not Swedish, that's Swiss". The band abandoned that song and went on to record genuine Swedish ones.

== Reception ==
Professional ratings
Review scores
Source	Rating
Allmusic	4/5 stars
The Rolling Stone Jazz Record Guide	4/5 stars
The Penguin Guide to Jazz Recordings	3.5/4 stars

The Allmusic review states "The band's cool and restrained style suits the music perfectly, turning it into jazz without losing its essence".

== Track listing ==
All compositions are traditional except as indicated

1. "Va Da Du? (Was It You?)" – 5:24
2. "De Salde Sina Hemman (They Sold Their Homestead)" – 6:13
3. "Den Motstravige Brudgummen (The Reluctant Groom)" – 5:52
4. "Och Hor du Unga Dora (And Listen Young Dora)" – 5:51
5. "Kristallen Den Fina (The Fine Crystal)" – 3:11
6. "Visa Vid Midsommartid (Midsummer Song)" (Rune Lindstrøm, Hakan Norlen) – 6:16

== Personnel ==
- Art Farmer – flugelhorn
- Jim Hall – guitar
- Steve Swallow – bass
- Pete LaRoca – drums
