= Manhattan (Art Farmer album) =

Studio album by Art Farmer Quintet
- Released: 1982
- Recorded: November 29–30, 1981
- Studio: Barigozzi Studio, Milano, Italy
- Genre: Jazz
- Length: 38:45
- Label: Soul Note; SN 1026
- Producer: Giovanni Bonandrini

Art Farmer chronology
A Work Of Art (1981)	Manhattan (1982)	Mirage (1982)

Manhattan is an album by American flugelhornist Art Farmer featuring performances recorded in 1981 and released on the Soul Note label.

== Reception ==
Professional ratings
Review scores
Source	Rating
AllMusic	4/5 stars
The Penguin Guide to Jazz Recordings	3.5/4 stars
The Rolling Stone Jazz Record Guide	3/5 stars

The AllMusic review called the album "of great interest to fans of Art Farmer".

== Track listing ==
1. "Context' (Kenny Drew) – 6:53
2. "Blue Wail" (Drew) – 5:06
3. "Manhattan" (Lorenz Hart, Richard Rodgers) – 6:50
4. "Passport" (Charlie Parker) – 6:48
5. "Arrival" (Horace Parlan) – 6:51
6. "Back Door Beauty" (Bennie Wallace) – 6:17

== Personnel ==
- Art Farmer – flugelhorn
- Sahib Shihab – soprano saxophone, baritone saxophone
- Kenny Drew – piano
- Mads Vinding – bass
- Ed Thigpen – drums
