= Sing Me Softly of the Blues =

Studio album by Art Farmer
- Released: 1965
- Recorded: March 12, 16 & 30, 1965; New York City
- Genre: Jazz
- Length: 34:50
- Label: Atlantic; SD 1442
- Producer: Arif Mardin

Art Farmer chronology
The Many Faces of Art Farmer (1964)	Sing Me Softly of the Blues (1965)	New York Jazz Sextet: Group Therapy (1965)

Sing Me Softly of the Blues is an album by Art Farmer's Quartet recorded in 1965, and released on the Atlantic label.

== Reception ==
The Allmusic review awarded the album 3 stars. The Penguin Guide to Jazz awarded the album 3 1/2 stars, noting that "the playing is immaculate and slow burning as only Farmer's records can be."

Professional ratings
Review scores
Source	Rating
Allmusic	3/5 stars
The Penguin Guide to Jazz Recordings	3.5/4 stars
Record Mirror	5/5 stars
The Rolling Stone Jazz Record Guide	4/5 stars

== Track listing ==
1. "Sing Me Softly of the Blues" (Carla Bley) - 6:44
2. "Ad Infinitum" (Bley) - 6:21
3. "Petite Belle" (Traditional) - 4:08
4. "Tears" (Pete LaRoca) - 5:45
5. "I Waited for You" (Walter Gil Fuller) - 5:55
6. "One for Majid" (LaRoca) - 5:57

== Personnel ==
- Art Farmer - flugelhorn
- Steve Kuhn - piano
- Steve Swallow - bass
- Pete LaRoca - drums
