= The Art Farmer Quintet Plays the Great Jazz Hits =

Studio album by Art Farmer Quintet
- Released: 1967
- Recorded: May 16, 23, & 25 and June 7, 1967; New York City
- Genre: Jazz
- Label: Columbia; CL 2746/CS 9546
- Producer: Teo Macero

Art Farmer chronology
The Time and the Place (1967)	The Art Farmer Quintet Plays the Great Jazz Hits (1967)	Art Worker (1968)

The Art Farmer Quintet Plays the Great Jazz Hits is an album by Art Farmer's Quintet recorded in 1967 and originally released on the Columbia label.

== Reception ==
Professional ratings
Review scores
Source	Rating
Allmusic	4/5 stars
The Rolling Stone Jazz Record Guide	3/5 stars
DownBeat	2/5 stars

Scott Yanow of Allmusic states, "The quintet's concise interpretations (no performance is over six minutes) are melodic without being overly predictable. As usual Farmer's lyricism by itself is a good reason to search for this underrated album".

Writing in Down Beat, Harvey Siders states "most tracks are played with the same inspiration one might find on a visit to the dentist," adding "that Farmer and Heath could rise above such a dismal format is a tribute to their instinct for swinging."

== Track listing ==
1. "Song for My Father" (Horace Silver) - 4:36
2. "'Round Midnight" (Thelonious Monk) - 5:30
3. "Sidewinder" (Lee Morgan) - 3:58
4. "Moanin'" (Bobby Timmons) - 4:49
5. "Watermelon Man" (Herbie Hancock) - 3:55
6. "Mercy, Mercy, Mercy" (Joe Zawinul) - 3:13
7. "I Remember Clifford" (Benny Golson) - 5:41
8. "Take Five" (Paul Desmond) - 3:37
9. "Gemini" (Jimmy Heath) - 5:28
10. "The 'In' Crowd" (Billy Page) - 4:11
- Recorded in New York City on May 16 (tracks 1–3 & 5), May 23 (tracks 4 & 6), May 25 (tracks 7 & 9) and June 7 (tracks 8 & 10), 1967

== Personnel ==
- Art Farmer - flugelhorn, trumpet
- Jimmy Heath - tenor saxophone
- Cedar Walton - piano
- Walter Booker - bass
- Mickey Roker - drums
