= Here and Now (The Jazztet album) =

Studio album by Art Farmer and Benny Golson
- Released: 1962
- Recorded: February 28 and March 2, 1962
- Studio: Nola Penthouse (New York City)
- Genre: Jazz
- Length: 43:11
- Label: Mercury; SR 60698
- Producer: Kay Norton

Art Farmer chronology
Perception (1961)	Here and Now (1962)	Another Git Together (1962)

Benny Golson chronology
The Jazztet at Birdhouse (1961)	Here and Now (1962)	Pop + Jazz = Swing (1962)

Professional ratings
Review scores
Source	Rating
Down Beat	4/5 stars
Allmusic	3/5 stars

Here and Now is an album by the Jazztet, led by trumpeter Art Farmer and saxophonist Benny Golson. It features performances recorded in 1962 and was originally released on the Mercury label.

== Background ==
This was the Jazztet's first recording for Mercury after they moved from Argo, following A&R man Jack Tracy. The Jazztet's first three albums had stressed the compositions of one person, but this one had "a diverse program that included contributions by each of the primary soloists and an equal number of standards and jazz tunes from outside the band."

== Music and recording ==
"Tonk" was the name of a card game played by its composer, Ray Bryant; it has a "bass-clef piano figure and a foreshortened bridge that takes the melody into a different key". Alternative takes that appeared later may have been made with the intention of releasing them as singles, or they may have been part of rehearsals of the tune. Farmer's "Rue Prevail" is a slow blues. Mabern's "Richie's Dilemma" was a tribute to Richie Powell and has a Latin tinge. Golson's "Whisper Not" dates from 1956. The following track, "Just in Time", was arranged by Farmer. Golson is featured on "Ruby, My Dear", which is played as a ballad. Moncur does not play on "In Love In Vain", which has "a loose, conversational approach to its statement of the melody", but he composed the final track on the original album, "Sonny's Back", a comment on the return from exile of saxophonist Sonny Rollins.

== Reception ==
The Allmusic review awarded the album 3 stars.

== Track listing ==
1. "Tonk" (Ray Bryant) – 6:46
2. "Rue Prevail" (Art Farmer) – 4:23
3. "Richie's Dilemma" (Harold Mabern) – 5:07
4. "Whisper Not" (Benny Golson) – 5:17
5. "Just in Time" (Adolph Green, Betty Comden, Jule Styne) – 5:22
6. "Ruby, My Dear" (Thelonious Monk) – 5:06
7. "In Love In Vain" (Jerome Kern, Leo Robin) – 7:08
8. "Sonny's Back" (Grachan Moncur III) – 4:02
9. "Tonk" [45-rpm take] (Bryant) – 3:01 Bonus track on CD
10. "Sonny's Back" [45-rpm take] (Moncur) – 2:51 Bonus track on CD

== Personnel ==
=== Musicians ===
- Art Farmer – trumpet, flugelhorn
- Benny Golson – tenor saxophone
- Grachan Moncur III – trombone
- Harold Mabern – piano
- Herbie Lewis – bass
- Roy McCurdy – drums

=== Production ===
- Kay Norton – production
- Tommy Nola – recording engineering
