= Real Time (The Jazztet album) =

Live album by Art Farmer/Benny Golson Jazztet featuring Curtis Fuller
- Released: 1988
- Recorded: February 21–22, 1986
- Venue: Sweet Basil, New York City
- Genre: Jazz
- Length: 48:42
- Label: Contemporary; C 14034
- Producer: Helen Keane

Art Farmer chronology
Back to the City (1986)	Real Time (1988)	Something to Live For: The Music of Billy Strayhorn (1987)

Real Time is a live album by the Art Farmer/Benny Golson Jazztet featuring Curtis Fuller recorded at the Sweet Basil Jazz Club in New York in 1986 and originally released on the Contemporary label in 1988.

== Reception ==
Professional ratings
Review scores
Source	Rating
Allmusic	4.5/5 stars
Penguin Guide to Jazz	3.5/4 stars

Scott Yanow of Allmusic said "This highly recommended disc is a near-classic". The Penguin Guide to Jazz awarded the album 3½ stars saying it "gives a vivid idea of the group's continued spirit".

== Track listing ==
All compositions by Benny Golson except as indicated

1. "Whisper Not" - 11:09
2. "Sad To Say" - 5:58
3. "Are You Real" - 8:19
4. "Autumn Leaves" (Joseph Kosma, Jacques Prévert, Johnny Mercer) - 13:51
5. "Along Came Betty" - 9:25

== Personnel ==
- Art Farmer - flugelhorn
- Benny Golson - tenor saxophone
- Curtis Fuller - trombone
- Mickey Tucker - piano
- Ray Drummond - bass
- Marvin "Smitty" Smith - drums
