= The Jazztet at Birdhouse =

Live album by Art Farmer and Benny Golson
- Released: 1961
- Recorded: May 15, 1961
- Venue: Birdhouse, Chicago
- Genre: Jazz
- Length: 40:00
- Label: Argo; LP 688
- Producer: Kay Norton

Art Farmer chronology
The Jazztet and John Lewis (1961)	The Jazztet at Birdhouse (1961)	Perception (1961)

Benny Golson chronology
The Jazztet and John Lewis (1961)	The Jazztet at Birdhouse (1961)	Here and Now (1962)

The Jazztet at Birdhouse is a live album by the Jazztet, led by trumpeter Art Farmer and saxophonist Benny Golson. It features performances recorded in Chicago in 1961 and was originally released on the Argo label.

== Reception ==
Professional ratings
Review scores
Source	Rating
Down Beat	4.5/5 stars
Allmusic	4/5 stars

The Allmusic review by Ken Dryden says, "The interaction between the musicians throughout the session adds to the value of this live material".

== Track listing ==
1. "Junction" (Benny Golson) - 5:54
2. "Farmer's Market" (Art Farmer) - 8:36
3. "Darn That Dream" (Jimmy Van Heusen, Eddie DeLange) - 4:28
4. "Shutterbug" (J. J. Johnson) - 4:50
5. "'Round Midnight" (Thelonious Monk) - 10:12
6. "November Afternoon" (Tom McIntosh) - 6:16

== Personnel ==
- Art Farmer - trumpet, flügelhorn
- Benny Golson - tenor saxophone
- Tom McIntosh - trombone
- Cedar Walton - piano
- Tommy Williams - bass
- Albert Heath - drums
