= New York Jazz Sextet: Group Therapy =

Studio album by Art Farmer
- Released: 1966
- Recorded: December 27, 1965 and January 17, 1966; New York City
- Genre: Jazz
- Length: 76:32
- Label: Scepter; SRM/SPS-526

Art Farmer chronology
Sing Me Softly of the Blues (1965)	New York Jazz Sextet: Group Therapy (1966)	The Time and the Place: The Lost Concert (1966)

Group Therapy (released on CD as Art Farmer's New York Jazz Sextet) is an album by Art Farmer's New York Jazz Sextet recorded in 1965 and 1966 and originally released on the Scepter label.

The Lone Hill Jazz CD reissue includes both mono and stereo versions. The stereo versions seem to have been mastered from a stereo LP and are poorly banded.

== Reception ==
Professional ratings
Review scores
Source	Rating
Allmusic	3.5/5 stars

Ken Dryden of Allmusic states, "Art Farmer fans will want to pick up this valuable reissue, especially since this represents the sole recording by this short-lived sextet".

== Track listing ==
1. "Signature" (Tom McIntosh) – 0:10
2. "Bottom on Top" (McIntosh) – 5:32
3. "Supplication" (Adolph Sandole) – 5:26
4. "Another Look" (Adolph Sandole) – 7:31
5. "Dim After Day" (Dennis Sandole) – 6:42
6. "Indian Summer" (Victor Herbert) – 4:32
7. "Joy Shout" (Dennis Sandole) – 4:37
8. "Giant Steps" (John Coltrane) – 3:41

== Personnel ==
- Art Farmer – flugelhorn
- Tom McIntosh – trombone
- James Moody – tenor saxophone, flute
- Patti Bown (track 8 & 16), Tommy Flanagan (tracks 1–7) – piano
- Richard Davis (tracks 1–7), Reggie Workman (track 8) – bass
- Albert Heath – drums
- Marie Volpee – vocals (track 8)
