= Nostalgia (The Jazztet album) =

Studio album by The New Jazztet
- Released: 1988
- Recorded: November 22–23, 1983
- Studio: Vanguard Studios, New York City
- Genre: Jazz
- Label: Baystate; RJL-8089
- Producer: Benny Golson & Fumimaru Kawashima

The New Jazztet chronology
Moment to Moment (1983)	Nostalgia (1988)	Back to the City (1986)

Nostalgia is an album by Art Farmer and Benny Golson's New Jazztet featuring Curtis Fuller, recorded in New York in 1983 and originally released on the Japanese Baystate label in 1984.

== Reception ==
Professional ratings
Review scores
Source	Rating
Allmusic	4/5 stars

Ken Dryden of Allmusic said "While neither version of the old nor the updated edition of the Jazztet met with commercial success, the various groups co-led by Art Farmer and Benny Golson always produced memorable recordings".

== Track listing ==
All compositions by Benny Golson except where noted

1. "Autumn Leaves" (Joseph Kosma, Jacques Prévert, Johnny Mercer)
2. "Jam 'N' Boogie"
3. "Caribbean Runabout"
4. "Dark Eyes" (Traditional)
5. "Red Dragonfly" (Kosaku Yamada)
6. "Solstice" (Art Farmer)
7. "From Dream to Dream"

== Personnel ==
- Art Farmer - flugelhorn
- Benny Golson - tenor saxophone
- Curtis Fuller - trombone
- Mickey Tucker - piano
- Rufus Reid - bass
- Billy Hart - drums
