= Back to the City =

Live album by Art Farmer/Benny Golson Jazztet featuring Curtis Fuller
- Released: 1986
- Recorded: February 21–22, 1986
- Venue: Sweet Basil Jazz Club, New York City
- Genre: Jazz
- Length: 45:05
- Label: Contemporary; C 14020
- Producer: Helen Keane

The Jazztet chronology
Nostalgia (1983)	Back to the City (1986)	Real Time (1986)

Back to the City is a live album by the Art Farmer/Benny Golson Jazztet featuring Curtis Fuller recorded at the Sweet Basil Jazz Club in New York in 1986 and originally released on the Contemporary label. The cover photograph was taken at Madison Square Park, Manhattan, New York City.

== Reception ==
Professional ratings
Review scores
Source	Rating
Allmusic	4/5 stars
Penguin Guide to Jazz	3.5/4 stars

Scott Yanow of Allmusic calls the album "Timeless hard bop music".The Penguin Guide to Jazz awarded the album 3 1/2 stars, saying it "features some lesser known items from the band's book, including a rare outing for Farmer as a composer".

== Track listing ==
All compositions by Benny Golson except as indicated

1. "Back to the City" - 7:55
2. "From Dream to Dream" - 6:49
3. "Write Soon" (Art Farmer) - 9:44
4. "Vas Simeon" - 7:31
5. "Speak Low" (Ogden Nash, Kurt Weill) - 6:07
6. "Without Delay/Time Speaks" - 6:59

== Personnel ==
- Art Farmer - flugelhorn
- Benny Golson - tenor saxophone
- Curtis Fuller - trombone
- Mickey Tucker - piano
- Ray Drummond - bass
- Marvin "Smitty" Smith - drums
