= Albert Heath =

American drummer (1935–2024)

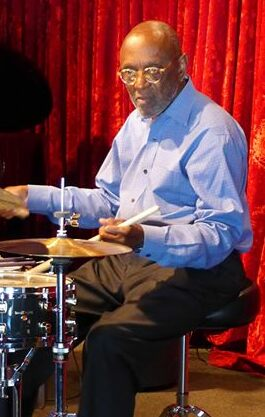
- Heath in 2014

Background information
- Also known as: Tootie Heath
- Born: May 31, 1935; Philadelphia, Pennsylvania, U.S.
- Died: April 3, 2024 (aged 88) Santa Fe, New Mexico, U.S.
- Genre: Jazz
- Instrument: Drums
- Years active: 1957–2024
- Formerly of: Heath Brothers
- Spouse: Beverly Collins (m. 1974)
- Relatives: Percy Heath (brother); Jimmy Heath (brother)

Albert "Tootie" Heath (May 31, 1935 – April 3, 2024) was an American jazz hard bop drummer, the brother of tenor saxophonist Jimmy Heath and the double-bassist Percy Heath. With Stanley Cowell, the Heaths formed the Heath Brothers jazz band in 1975.

== Life and career ==
Born in Philadelphia, Pennsylvania, United States on May 31 1935, he first recorded in 1957 with John Coltrane. From 1958 to 1974, he worked with, among others, J. J. Johnson, Wes Montgomery, Art Farmer and Benny Golson's Jazztet, Cedar Walton, Bobby Timmons, Kenny Drew, Sonny Rollins, Dexter Gordon, Johnny Griffin, Herbie Hancock, Friedrich Gulda, Nina Simone, and Yusef Lateef. In 1975, he, Jimmy and Percy formed the Heath Brothers. He remained with the group until 1978, then left to freelance. He recorded extensively throughout his career.

Among his many workshop and classroom teaching assignments, Heath was a regular instructor at the Stanford Jazz Workshop.

Heath was later the producer and leader of The Whole Drum Truth, a jazz drum ensemble featuring Ben Riley, Ed Thigpen, Jackie Williams, Billy Hart, Charlie Persip, Leroy Williams and Louis Hayes.

Albert Heath died of leukemia in Santa Fe, New Mexico, on April 3, 2024, at the age of 88.

== Discography ==
=== As leader ===
- 1969: Kawaida (O'Be, 1969) with Ed Blackwell, Herbie Hancock, Buster Williams, James Mtume
- 1974: Kwanza (The First) (Muse)
- 2009: Live at Smalls (Smalls Live)
- 2012: Krakkle (Geco)
- 2013: Tootie's Tempo (Sunnyside)
- 2014: Philadelphia Beat (Sunnyside)

=== As sideman ===
With Kenny Barron

- Peruvian Blue (Muse, 1974)

With Walter Benton

- Out of This World (Jazzland, 1960)

With Anthony Braxton

- In the Tradition (SteepleChase, 1974)
- In the Tradition Volume 2 (SteepleChase, 1974 [1977])

With George Cables

- Skylark (SteepleChase, 1995)

With the Kenny Clarke/Francy Boland Big Band

- Latin Kaleidoscope (MPS, 1968)

With John Coltrane

- Coltrane (Prestige, 1957)
- Lush Life (Prestige, 1957–58 [1961])

With Ted Curson

- Quicksand (Atlantic, 1974)

With Kenny Dorham

- Trompeta Toccata (Blue Note, 1964)

With Kenny Drew

- Dark Beauty (Steeplechase, 1974)
- If You Could See Me Now (Steeplechase, 1974)

With Art Farmer

- Big City Sounds (Argo, 1960) – with Benny Golson
- Art (Argo, 1960)
- The Jazztet and John Lewis (Argo, 1961) – with Benny Golson
- The Jazztet at Birdhouse (Argo, 1961) – with Benny Golson
- New York Jazz Sextet: Group Therapy (Scepter, 1966)
- Voices All (Eastworld, 1982) – with Benny Golson
- Moment to Moment (Soul Note, 1983) – with Benny Golson
- Central Avenue Reunion (Contemporary, 1989)

With Benny Golson

- Take a Number from 1 to 10 (Argo, 1961)
- The Roland Kirk Quartet Meets the Benny Golson Orchestra (Mercury, 1964)

With Dexter Gordon

- Both Sides of Midnight (Black Lion, 1967 [1981])
- Body and Soul (Black Lion, 1967 [1981])
- Take the "A" Train (Black Lion, 1967 [1988])
- The Tower of Power! (Prestige, 1969)
- More Power! (Prestige, 1969)
- The Apartment (SteepleChase, 1975)

With Bennie Green and Gene Ammons

- The Swingin'est (Vee-Jay, 1958)

With Johnny Griffin

- Bush Dance (Galaxy, 1978)

With Herbie Hancock

- The Prisoner (Blue Note, 1969)
- Fat Albert Rotunda (Warner Bros.-Seven Arts, 1969)

With Jimmy Heath

- The Thumper (Riverside, 1959)
- Really Big! (Riverside, 1960)
- The Quota (Riverside, 1961)
- Triple Threat (Riverside, 1962)
- Swamp Seed (Riverside, 1963)
- On the Trail (Riverside, 1964)
- The Gap Sealer (Cobblestone, 1973)
- You've Changed (SteepleChase, 1991)
- You or Me (SteepleChase, 1995)

With Milt Jackson

- Milt Jackson Quintet Live at the Village Gate (Riverside, 1963)
- Much in Common with Ray Brown (Verve, 1964)

With J. J. Johnson

- J. J. in Person! (Columbia, 1958)
- Really Livin' (Columbia, 1959)
- J.J. Inc. (Columbia, 1961)

With Clifford Jordan

- Spellbound (Riverside, 1960)
- Starting Time (Jazzland, 1961)
- These are My Roots: Clifford Jordan Plays Leadbelly (Atlantic, 1965)
- In the World (Strata-East, 1969 [1972])
- Half Note (SteepleChase, 1974 [1985])

With Yusef Lateef

- Yusef Lateef's Detroit (Atlantic, 1969)
- Suite 16 (Atlantic, 1970)
- The Gentle Giant (Atlantic, 1971)
- Hush 'N' Thunder (Atlantic, 1972)
- Part of the Search (Atlantic, 1973)
- 10 Years Hence (Atlantic, 1974)

With Johnny Lytle

- Blue Vibes (Jazzland, 1960)

With Roberto Magris

- Morgan Rewind: A Tribute to Lee Morgan Vol. 1 (JMood Records, 2012)
- One Night in with Hope and More Vol. 1 (JMood, 2012)
- One Night in with Hope and More Vol. 2 (JMood, 2013)

With Guido Manusardi

- Trio de Jazz (Electrecord – EDE 0476, 1968)

With Warne Marsh

- Back Home (Criss Cross, 1986)

With Ronnie Mathews

- Doin' the Thang! (Prestige, 1963)

With Charles McPherson

- Bebop Revisited! (Prestige, 1964)

With Blue Mitchell

- A Sure Thing (Riverside, 1962)
- Mapenzi with Harold Land (Concord, 1977)

With Roscoe Mitchell

- Hey Donald (Delmark, 1995)
- In Walked Buckner (Delmark, 1999)

With Wes Montgomery

- The Incredible Jazz Guitar of Wes Montgomery (Riverside, 1960)

With Tete Montoliu

- Piano for Nuria (SABA, 1968)
- Catalonian Fire (SteepleChase, 1974)
- Tete! (SteepleChase, 1975)
- Tête à Tete (SteepleChase, 1976)
- Tootie's Tempo (SteepleChase, 1976 [1979])
- Catalonian Nights Vol. 1 (Steeplechase, 1980 [1981])
- Catalonian Nights Vol. 2 (Steeplechase, 1980 [1985])
- Catalonian Nights Vol. 3 (Steeplechase, 1980 [1989])

With Don Patterson

- These Are Soulful Days (Muse, 1973)

With Cecil Payne

- Zodiac (Strata-East, 1968 [1973])

With Niels-Henning Ørsted Pedersen

- Double Bass (SteepleChase, 1976) with Sam Jones

With Sonny Red

- Breezing (Jazzland, 1960)

With George Russell

- George Russell Sextet at Beethoven Hall (MPS, 1965)

With Michel Sardaby

- Night Blossom (DIW, 1990)

With Bud Shank

- That Old Feeling (Contemporary, 1986)

With Nina Simone

- Little Girl Blue (Bethlehem, 1958)
- Nina Simone and Her Friends (Bethlehem, 1959)

With Les Spann

- Gemini (Jazzland, 1961)

With Billy Taylor

- Billy Taylor with Four Flutes (Riverside, 1959)

With Bobby Timmons

- Chun-King (Prestige, 1964)

With Mal Waldron

- Impressions (New Jazz, 1959)

With Cedar Walton

- Soul Cycle (Prestige, 1969)

With The Young Lions

- The Young Lions (Vee-Jay, 1960)

With Bill Harris

- Encompass Quartet (Daddy Jazz, 1997)

== Awards and nominations ==
In October 2020, the National Endowment for the Arts (NEA) announced Heath as one of four recipients of the NEA Jazz Masters Fellowships, celebrated in an online concert and show on 22 April 2021. Awarded in recognition of lifetime achievement, the honor is bestowed on individuals who have made significant contributions to the art form. The other 2021 recipients were Terri Lyne Carrington, Phil Schaap, and Henry Threadgill.
