= Mirage (Art Farmer album) =

Studio album by Art Farmer Quintet
- Released: 1982
- Recorded: September 18–19, 1982
- Studio: Vanguard Studios, NYC
- Genre: Jazz
- Length: 41:28
- Label: Soul Note; SN 1046
- Producer: Giovanni Bonandrini

Art Farmer chronology
Manhattan (1981)	Mirage (1982)	Warm Valley (1982)

Mirage is an album by American flugelhornist Art Farmer's Quintet featuring performances, recorded in 1982 and released on the Soul Note label.

== Reception ==
Professional ratings
Review scores
Source	Rating
AllMusic	4/5 stars
The Penguin Guide to Jazz Recordings	3.5/4 stars
The Rolling Stone Jazz Record Guide	3/5 stars

The AllMusic review stated: "Mirage marked a reunion for Art Farmer and Clifford Jordan, who had known each other for decades but only recorded together on occasion at the time of these 1982 sessions".

== Track listing ==
1. "Barbados" (Charlie Parker) - 5:07
2. "Passos" (Fritz Pauer) - 7:13
3. "My Kinda Love" (Louis Alter, Jo Trent) - 8:24
4. "Mirage" (Fred Hersch) - 8:12
5. "Cherokee Sketches" (Pauer) - 6:38
6. "Smiling Billy" (Jimmy Heath) - 5:54

== Personnel ==
- Art Farmer - flugelhorn
- Clifford Jordan - tenor saxophone
- Fred Hersch - piano
- Ray Drummond - bass
- Akira Tana - drums
