= Big City Sounds =

Studio album by Art Farmer and Benny Golson
- Released: 1960
- Recorded: September 16, 19 & 20, 1960
- Studio: Nola's Penthouse, New York City
- Genre: Jazz
- Length: 39:56
- Label: Argo; LP 672
- Producer: Kay Norton

Art Farmer chronology
Meet the Jazztet (1960)	Big City Sounds (1960)	Art (1960)

Benny Golson chronology
Meet the Jazztet (1960)	Big City Sounds (1960)	Take a Number from 1 to 10 (1960)

Big City Sounds is an album by The Jazztet, led by trumpeter Art Farmer and saxophonist Benny Golson, featuring performances recorded in 1960 and originally released on the Argo label.

== Music ==
"The Cool One" is a medium tempo piece by Golson that was intended to be a commercial success, as "Killer Joe" had been on the Jazztet's previous album, Meet the Jazztet. "Blues on Down" is also by Golson, and was originally performed for his album The Modern Touch. Golson added 16 written bars to the version of "Hi-Fly" recorded for Big City Sounds, which is faster than usual. Farmer is the main feature on the jazz standard "My Funny Valentine". "Wonder Why" has "a 36-bar, AABA'C form". The Latin "Con Alma" also contains material added by Golson. "Lament" is a feature for trombonist Tom McIntosh, while "Bean Bag" features pianist Cedar Walton. The final track, "Five Spot After Dark", is a blues written by Golson when playing at New York's Five Spot.

== Reception ==
The Allmusic review awarded the album 3 stars.

Professional ratings
Review scores
Source	Rating
Allmusic	3/5 stars

== Track listing ==
All compositions by Benny Golson except as indicated

1. "The Cool One" – 3:02
2. "Blues on Down" – 6:03
3. "Hi-Fly" (Randy Weston) – 5:50
4. "My Funny Valentine" (Lorenz Hart, Richard Rodgers) – 4:33
5. "Wonder Why" (Sammy Cahn) – 5:54
6. "Con Alma" (Dizzy Gillespie) – 5:00
7. "Lament" (J. J. Johnson) – 3:31
8. "Bean Bag" – 4:53
9. "Five Spot After Dark" – 3:18

== Personnel ==
- Art Farmer – trumpet
- Benny Golson – tenor saxophone
- Tom McIntosh – trombone
- Cedar Walton – piano
- Tommy Williams – bass
- Albert Heath – drums
