= The Jazztet and John Lewis =

Studio album by John Lewis, Art Farmer and Benny Golson
- Released: 1961
- Recorded: December 20–21, 1960; January 9, 1961
- Studio: Nola's Penthouse, NYC
- Genre: Jazz
- Length: 41:55
- Label: Argo; LP 684
- Producer: Kay Norton

Art Farmer chronology
Art (1960)	The Jazztet and John Lewis (1961)	The Jazztet at Birdhouse (1961)

Benny Golson chronology
Take a Number from 1 to 10 (1960)	The Jazztet and John Lewis (1961)	The Jazztet at Birdhouse (1961)

The Jazztet and John Lewis is an album by the Jazztet, led by trumpeter Art Farmer and saxophonist Benny Golson and featuring performances composed and arranged by John Lewis. It was recorded in late 1960 and early 1961 and originally released on the Argo label.

== Music and recording ==
John Lewis wrote all of the compositions. The first, "Bel", was written for this recording and is an "affirmative blues with altered chord changes and a slightly [Thelonious] Monkish line". "Milano" is a ballad with "an arrangement that rotates the lead among the three horns". "Django" had been recorded by several groups; this version has a higher tempo than most and has "a vamp that links individual statements and appears as a prodding background", as on the opening track. "New York 19" is another ballad. "2 Degrees East, 3 Degrees West" is a "medium-slow blues" that again features a vamp. "Odds Against Tomorrow" was written for the 1959 film of the same title; "Lewis passes the melody among the instruments, with diverse combinations of the horns in pairs that gain prominence when the 32-bar blowing section finally arrives."

== Reception ==
Professional ratings
Review scores
Source	Rating
Allmusic	4/5 stars

The Allmusic review states, "Even though the Jazztet and Lewis' own group, the Modern Jazz Quartet, are dissimilar in many ways, the marriage is a successful one".

== Track listing ==
All compositions by John Lewis

1. "Bel" – 4:05
2. "Milano" – 4:49
3. "Django" – 4:50
4. "New York 19" – 7:04
5. "2 Degrees East, 3 Degrees West" – 8:40
6. "Odds Against Tomorrow" – 12:27

== Personnel ==
=== Musicians ===
- Art Farmer – trumpet
- Benny Golson – tenor saxophone
- Tom McIntosh – trombone
- Cedar Walton – piano
- Tommy Williams – bass
- Albert Heath – drums
- John Lewis – arranger

=== Production ===
- Kay Norton – production
- Tommy Nola – recording engineering
