= The Time and the Place (Art Farmer album) =

Studio album by Art Farmer Quintet
- Released: 1967
- Recorded: February 8, 1967; New York City
- Genre: Jazz
- Label: Columbia; CL 2649
- Producer: Teo Macero

Art Farmer chronology
Baroque Sketches (1966)	The Time and the Place (1967)	The Art Farmer Quintet Plays the Great Jazz Hits (1967)

The Time and the Place is an album by Art Farmer's Quintet recorded in 1967 and originally released on the Columbia label. Although originally promoted as a live album the tracks were actually recorded in the studio and audience overdubbed. In 2007, Mosaic Records released the original live set from the original three-track recordings as the title The Time and the Place: The Lost Concert.

== Reception ==
Professional ratings
Review scores
Source	Rating
Allmusic	3/5 stars
The Rolling Stone Jazz Record Guide	4/5 stars

Ken Dryden of Allmusic states, "Although the overly enthusiastic audience tends at times to applaud prematurely and a bit too loudly, the music is first-rate".

== Track listing ==
1. "The Time and the Place" (Jimmy Heath) - 4:30
2. "The Shadow of Your Smile" (Johnny Mandel, Paul Francis Webster) - 7:10
3. "One for Juan" (Heath) - 8:56
4. "Nino's Scene" (Art Farmer) - 5:53
5. "Short Cake" (J.J. Johnson) - 5:26
6. "Make Someone Happy" (Betty Comden, Adolph Green, Jule Styne) - 6:57
7. "On the Trail" (Ferde Grofé) - 2:31

== Personnel ==
- Art Farmer - flugelhorn
- Jimmy Heath - tenor saxophone
- Cedar Walton - piano
- Walter Booker - bass
- Mickey Roker - drums
