= Moment to Moment (The Jazztet album) =

Studio album by The Jazztet
- Released: 1983
- Recorded: May 30–31, 1983
- Studio: Barigozzi Studio, Milan, Italy
- Genre: Jazz
- Length: 51:27
- Label: Soul Note; SN 1066
- Producer: Giovanni Bonandrini

The Jazztet chronology
Voices All (1982)	Moment to Moment (1983)	Nostalgia (1983)

Moment to Moment is an album by Art Farmer and Benny Golson's group, The Jazztet recorded in Italy in 1983 and originally released on the Soul Note label.

== Reception ==
Professional ratings
Review scores
Source	Rating
Allmusic	4.5/5 stars
The Rolling Stone Jazz Record Guide	5/5 stars

Allmusic awarded the album 4½ stars.

== Track listing ==
All compositions by Benny Golson except as indicated

1. "Moment to Moment" - 8:50
2. "Along Came Betty" - 6:45
3. "Farmer's Market" (Art Farmer) - 5:32
4. "Fair Weather" - 5:50
5. "Yesterday's Thoughts" - 8:21
6. "Ease Away Walk" - 8:21

== Personnel ==
- Art Farmer - flugelhorn, trumpet
- Benny Golson - tenor saxophone
- Curtis Fuller - trombone
- Mickey Tucker - piano
- Ray Drummond - bass
- Albert Heath - drums
