= Another Git Together =

Studio album by Art Farmer and Benny Golson
- Released: 1962
- Recorded: May 28 and June 21, 1962; Nola's Penthouse Sound Studios, New York City
- Genre: Jazz
- Length: 34:28
- Label: Mercury; SR 60737
- Producer: Kay Norton

Art Farmer chronology
Here and Now (1962)	Another Git Together (1962)	Listen to Art Farmer and the Orchestra (1962)

Benny Golson chronology
Pop + Jazz = Swing (1962)	Another Git Together (1962)	Turning Point (1962)

Another Git Together is an album by the Jazztet, led by trumpeter Art Farmer and saxophonist Benny Golson. It features performances recorded in 1962 and originally released on the Mercury label. It was the band's last recording for 20 years.

== Background ==
The personnel for this album was the same as for the Jazztet's previous recording for Mercury.

== Music and recording ==
"Space Station" is a rapid 24-bar composition by trombonist Moncur. "Domino" is a waltz; "Another Git Together" is a blues. Golson's "Along Came Betty" is faster than its original 1958 version. "This Nearly Was Mine" is from South Pacific and is another waltz, but has additional written material towards the end. This is the first recording of "Reggie", a tribute to composer Golson's second son; it has a "30-bar chorus" and "is a swinging conclusion to the album".

== Reception ==
Professional ratings
Review scores
Source	Rating
Down Beat	4/5 stars
Allmusic	4/5 stars
The Rolling Stone Jazz Record Guide	3/5 stars

Scott Yanow of Allmusic states, "This spirited and swinging set has six strong selections".

== Track listing ==
1. "Space Station" (Grachan Moncur III) – 5:10
2. "Domino" (Don Raye, Jacques Plante, Louis Ferrari) – 6:58
3. "Another Git Together" (Jon Hendricks, Pony Poindexter) – 6:12
4. "Along Came Betty" (Benny Golson) – 5:24
5. "This Nearly Was Mine" (Richard Rodgers, Oscar Hammerstein II) – 6:20
6. "Reggie" (Benny Golson) – 4:24

== Personnel ==
=== Musicians ===
- Art Farmer – trumpet, flugelhorn
- Benny Golson – tenor saxophone
- Grachan Moncur III – trombone
- Harold Mabern – piano
- Herbie Lewis – bass
- Roy McCurdy – drums

=== Production ===
- Kay Norton – production
- Tommy Nola – recording engineering
