= The Time and the Place: The Lost Concert =

Live album by Art Farmer Quintet
- Released: November 20, 2007
- Recorded: August 18, 1966
- Venues: Museum of Modern Art, NYC
- Genre: Jazz
- Length: 72:06
- Labels: Mosaic; MCD-1010
- Producer: Michael Cuscuna

Art Farmer chronology
New York Jazz Sextet: Group Therapy (1965)	The Time and the Place: The Lost Concert (2007)	Baroque Sketches (1966)

The Time and the Place: The Lost Concert is a live album by Art Farmer's Quintet recorded at the Museum of Modern Art in 1966 and released on the Mosaic label in 2007. The album is taken from a concert originally intended for release as The Time and the Place on Columbia Records in 1967 which was replaced by studio recordings with overdubbed applause. Three tracks from the concert were previously released on an expanded 2LP edition of The Time and the Place in 1982.

== Reception ==
The Allmusic review awarded the album 4 stars stating "A worthy addition, and not a footnote, to the great discography of Art Farmer, Mosaic and Michael Cuscuna deserve big kudos for unearthing this heretofore hidden treasure".

Professional ratings
Review scores
Source	Rating
Allmusic	4/5 stars

== Track listing ==
1. "On the Trail" (Ferde Grofé) - 10:09
2. Band Announcement - 0:41
3. "Far Away Lands" (Jimmy Heath) - 6:46
4. "The Shadow of Your Smile" (Johnny Mandel, Paul Francis Webster) - 14:33
5. "Dailey Bread" (Albert Dailey) - 12:02 Previously released on 2LP reissue of The Time and the Place
6. "Blue Bossa" (Kenny Dorham) - 8:02 Previously released on 2LP reissue of The Time and the Place
7. "Is That So?" (Duke Pearson) - 9:06 Previously released on 2LP reissue of The Time and the Place
8. "The Time and the Place" (Heath) - 10:47

== Personnel ==
- Art Farmer - flugelhorn
- Jimmy Heath - tenor saxophone
- Albert Dailey - piano
- Walter Booker - bass
- Mickey Roker - drums
