= Tom McIntosh =

American jazz musician

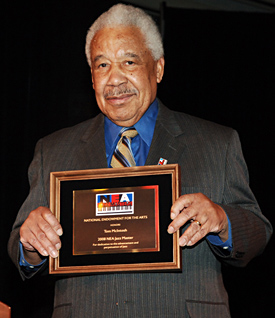
- McIntosh receives the Jazz Master award from the National Endowment for the Arts in 2008. The award is the highest honor in jazz in the United States.

Background information
- Born: Thomas S. McIntosh; February 6, 1927; Baltimore, Maryland, U.S.
- Died: July 26, 2017 (aged 90)
- Genres: Jazz
- Occupations: Instrumentalist, composer, arranger, conductor
- Instrument: Trombone

Thomas S. McIntosh (February 6, 1927 – July 26, 2017) was an American jazz trombonist, composer, arranger, and conductor.

McIntosh was born in Baltimore, Maryland, the eldest of six siblings. He also had an elder half-sibling by his father. He studied at Peabody Conservatory. He was stationed in West Germany after World War II. He played trombone in an Army band, and eventually graduated from Juilliard in 1958. He played in New York City from 1956, with Lee Morgan, Roland Kirk, James Moody (1959, 1962) and the Art Farmer/Benny Golson Jazztet (1960–61).

In 1961, McIntosh composed a song for trumpeter Howard McGhee. In 1963, he composed music for Dizzy Gillespie's Something Old, Something New album. The following year his composition Whose Child Are You? was performed by the New York Jazz Sextet, of which he was a member. He also worked with Thad Jones and Mel Lewis later in the 1960s.

In 1969, McIntosh gave up jazz and moved to Los Angeles to pursue a career in film and television composing. He wrote music for The Learning Tree, Soul Soldier, Shaft's Big Score, Slither, A Hero Ain't Nothin' but a Sandwich, and John Handy.

In 2008, McIntosh was named a Jazz Master by the National Endowment for the Arts McIntosh was a member of Jehovah's Witnesses and once preached to Benny Golson about the faith.

== Discography ==
- Manhattan Serenade (1968) - Earl Coleman - with Jerome Richardson (fl) Billy Taylor (p) Frank Foster (ts) Tom McIntosh Eddie Williams (ts) Gene Bertoncini (g) Reggie Workman (b) Bobby Thomas (d)
- With Malice Toward None: The Music Of Tom McIntosh (IPO, 2003)

=== As arranger/composer ===
With Art Blakey

- Hold On, I'm Coming (Limelight, 1965)

With Illinois Jacquet

- Bosses of the Ballad (Argo, 1964)

With James Moody

- Another Bag (Argo, 1962)
- Great Day (Argo, 1963)
- Moody and the Brass Figures (Milestone, 1966)
- The Blues and Other Colors (Miilestone, 1969)

With Bobby Timmons

- Got to Get It! (Milestone, 1967)

With Milt Jackson

- Milt Jackson and the Hip String Quartet (Verve, 1968)

=== As sideman ===
With Art Farmer

- Big City Sounds (Argo, 1960) - with Benny Golson
- The Jazztet and John Lewis (Argo, 1961) - with Benny Golson
- The Jazztet at Birdhouse (Argo, 1961) - with Benny Golson
- New York Jazz Sextet: Group Therapy (Scepter, 1966)

With Dizzy Gillespie

- The Dizzy Gillespie Reunion Big Band (MPS, 1968)

With Eddie Harris

- Plug Me In (Atlantic, 1968)

With Jimmy Heath

- Really Big! (Riverside, 1960)

With Milt Jackson

- Vibrations (Atlantic, 1960–61)
- Big Bags (Riverside, 1962)
- For Someone I Love (Riverside, 1963)
- Ray Brown / Milt Jackson with Ray Brown (Verve, 1965)

With John Lewis

- Odds Against Tomorrow (Soundtrack) (United Artists, 1959)

With Jack McDuff

- Prelude (Prestige, 1963)

With James Moody

- James Moody (Argo, 1959)

With Oliver Nelson

- The Spirit of '67 with Pee Wee Russell (Impulse!, 1967)

With Shirley Scott

- For Members Only (Impulse!, 1963)
- Roll 'Em: Shirley Scott Plays the Big Bands (Impulse!, 1966)

With Jimmy Smith

- Hoochie Coochie Man (Verve, 1966)

== Sources ==
- Leonard Feather and Ira Gitler, The Biographical Encyclopedia of Jazz. Oxford, 1999, p. 451.
