= The Jazztet =

American jazz ensemble

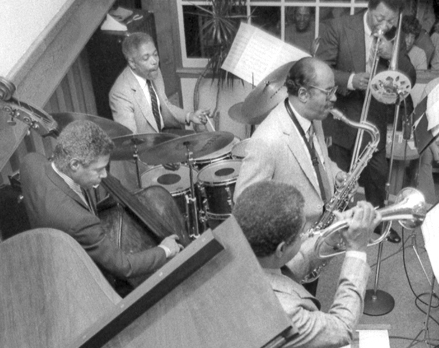
- The Jazztet in 1985

Background information
- Origin: United States
- Genres: Jazz; Hard bop
- Years active: 1959–1962; 1982–late 1980s
- Past members: Art Farmer; Benny Golson; Curtis Fuller; Mccoy Tyner; Addison Farmer; Dave Bailey

The Jazztet was a jazz sextet, co-founded in 1959 by trumpeter Art Farmer and tenor saxophonist Benny Golson, always featuring the founders along with a trombonist and a piano-bass-drums rhythm section. In its first phase, the Jazztet lasted until 1962, and helped to launch the careers of pianist McCoy Tyner and trombonist Grachan Moncur III. Farmer and Golson revived the group in 1982 and it again toured extensively. Each generation of the group recorded six albums, which were released on a variety of labels.

The Jazztet was "famous for nicely structured, precise yet soulful pieces and a swinging style". It benefitted from having a set of strong compositions by Golson, including "I Remember Clifford", "Whisper Not", "Blues March", "Killer Joe" and "Five Spot After Dark". While Golson also provided many of the arrangements, Farmer took the largest share of the soloing responsibilities.

== Origins: 1959 ==
The Jazztet was co-founded by trumpet and flugelhorn player Art Farmer and saxophonist Benny Golson in 1959. They had first played together in 1953, but soon separated – Farmer then recorded under his own name and was a sideman for several leaders, while Golson composed and played for various bands. The two collaborated on Farmer's quintet recording, Modern Art, in 1958, and the 10-piece Brass Shout the following year, after both had signed to United Artists Records. Golson reported that he wanted to form a sextet, because "there were so many quintets around, and I wanted to hear one more voice in the band. When I called Art with the idea, he just started laughing, because he was ready to leave Gerry Mulligan and had been about to call me to be the tenor saxophonist in his new sextet." The pair decided to choose two additional members each; Farmer selected Addison Farmer (bass) and Dave Bailey (drums), and Golson picked Curtis Fuller (trombone), and McCoy Tyner (piano). All agreed to join, so these six formed the original sextet. The band's manager was Kay Norton, a United Artists executive.

Bailey stated that the band name was created by himself and Fuller; Golson credited Fuller alone, and said that he asked the trombonist if the name could be used, after it had been used on Fuller's The Curtis Fuller Jazztet, which was recorded in August 1959. The name "Jazztet" had, however, been used at least as early as 1949, for a band led by Eddie Woodland in the New Jersey–Maryland area.

The Jazztet's first public performance was on November 10, 1959, at the Village Note in Washington, D.C. Their first appearance in New York was at the Five Spot on November 17. A later New York appearance, at the Town Hall on November 28, was well received, with The New York Times' critic John S. Wilson writing that, although the soloists were "unusually good", "it is the ensemble feeling of the group that is its strongest point, for Mr. Golson's arrangements constantly offer the soloists a kind of close, intimate support that has all but disappeared from small group jazz".

Their New York debut was shared with Ornette Coleman and other players of a more radical style than their own. Farmer felt that the band suffered from being co-billed with Coleman, who attracted more press attention: "compared to what Ornette was doing, what we were doing [...] was more conventional. It just didn't seem to be as adventurous, stepping out into the unknown like what Ornette was doing. Ornette got more notice than we did. I don't think we ever recovered from that."

== 1960–1962 ==
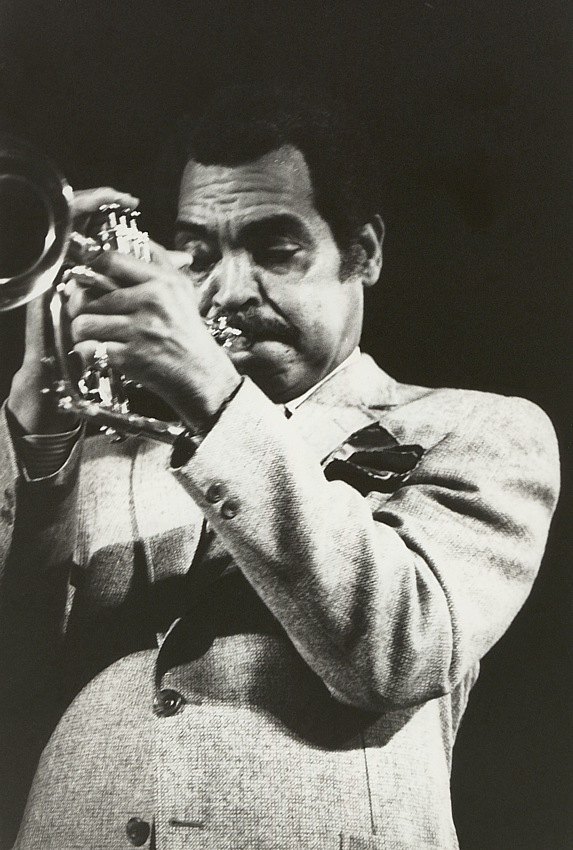
Art Farmer

Following their first appearance in Chicago (at the Orchestra Hall) on February 12, 1960, the Jazztet made its television debut, on The Steve Allen Show, on February 15. Their first record contract, with Argo Records, was announced in March, 1960; by this time, Lex Humphries had replaced Bailey on drums, with the latter stating that he left because "outside forces" had pressured the two leaders to use the name "the Art Farmer/Benny Golson Jazztet". This is the band that recorded the Jazztet's first album, Meet the Jazztet, on February 6, 9 and 10. The album was reported as having good sales, and a single from it, "Killer Joe", with "Mox Nix" on the B side, reportedly sold over 40,000 copies in a few months. By May the same year, Tyner had left to join John Coltrane's band; he was replaced by Duke Pearson. The band played at the Newport Jazz Festival on June 30, 1960 and the first Atlantic City jazz festival two days later.

Also in 1960, the Jazztet won Down Beat Magazine's International Critics Poll New Star award for jazz groups. By July the same year, Tom McIntosh had replaced Fuller on trombone, with the other five members being the same. By the following month, however, the drummer had changed: Albert Heath replacing Humphries. The personnel continued to change: by early September, Addison Farmer had left, being replaced on bass by Tommy Williams, and pianist Cedar Walton had taken over from Pearson. The rapid turnover of personnel was attributable in large part to differences of opinion on financial aspects of the band's existence. Norton reported that the two co-leaders had invested considerably in the band, as the time commitment required meant that their sideman appearances fell considerably, as did the number of compositions Golson created for other leaders. This sextet recorded three albums: Big City Sounds (September 16, 19 and 20, 1960); The Jazztet and John Lewis (December 20 and 21, 1960, and January 9, 1961, featuring compositions and arrangements by John Lewis); and the May 15, 1961 concert recording entitled The Jazztet at Birdhouse. Critic Bob Blumenthal's comment on Meet the Jazztet and Big City Sounds was that "too many features for supporting band members and the resulting programming clutter make [...them] imperfect representations of the band's first year", although "they offer a clear enough picture of the unit's character", which combined numerous, unexpected written sections that helped to gel each piece and its improvised parts together. On July 1, 1961, the Jazztet again played the Newport Jazz Festival.

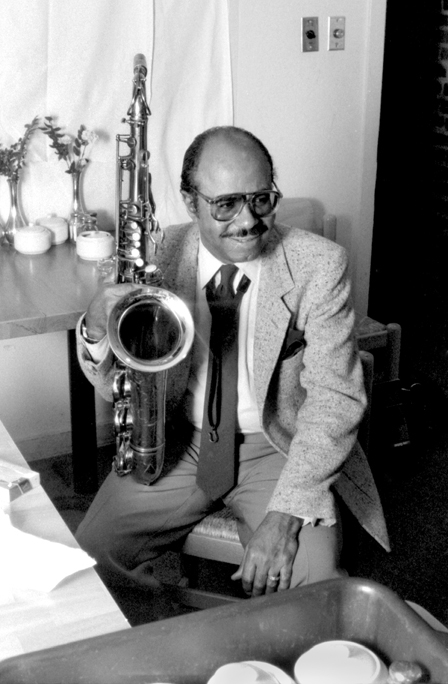
Benny Golson in 1985

By the time of the band's first recording for Mercury Records, 1962's Here and Now, only Farmer and Golson remained from the Argo days. Kenny Barron was briefly the new pianist, but was replaced by Harold Mabern; the other new players were Grachan Moncur III (trombone), Herbie Lewis (bass), and Roy McCurdy (drums). The move to Mercury followed Argo A&R man Jack Tracy, and seemed to Golson "like a step up".

The band eventually broke up later in 1962, for a combination of reasons. The leaders felt the project was time-consuming, with frequent rehearsals required to integrate new members unfamiliar with their difficult material. Farmer stated that "we were spending more time rehearsing what we had done than moving ahead. [...] Benny felt like he would like to stay in New York, [...] and do more writing and get involved with various other things than just working with the Jazztet on the road and writing for the Jazztet". Golson reported that each of the leaders "wanted to go in a different direction, and it was impossible to pursue both in one band", and that the band was getting fewer bookings.

== Reunion: 1980s and 1990s ==
The Jazztet reformed in the 1980s and 1990s. In early 1983, the band contained Farmer, Golson, Fuller, Mickey Tucker (piano), Ray Drummond (bass), and Heath. In July, 1995 the Jazztet, with Farmer, Golson, Fuller, Michael Weiss (piano), Buster Williams (bass) and Carl Allen (drums) toured Europe, performing at jazz festivals in Vienna, Copenhagen, Rotterdam, and Belgrade.

== Discography ==
All have Art Farmer (trumpet and flugelhorn) and Benny Golson (tenor saxophone).

Year recorded	Title	Label	Other Musicians / Notes
1960	Meet the Jazztet	Argo	Curtis Fuller (trombone), McCoy Tyner (piano), Addison Farmer (bass), Lex Humphries (drums)
1960	Big City Sounds	Argo	Tom McIntosh (trombone), Cedar Walton (piano), Tommy Williams (bass), Albert Heath (drums)
1960–61	The Jazztet and John Lewis	Argo	Personnel as on Big City Sounds; John Lewis (composer, arranger)
1961	The Jazztet at Birdhouse	Argo	Personnel as on Big City Sounds; in concert
1962	Here and Now	Mercury	Grachan Moncur III (trombone), Harold Mabern (piano), Herbie Lewis (bass), Roy McCurdy (drums)
1962	Another Git Together	Mercury	Personnel as on Here and Now
1982	Voices All	East World	Curtis Fuller, Cedar Walton, Buster Williams (bass), Albert Heath
1982	In Performance at the Playboy Jazz Festival	Elektra/Musician	Mike Wolff (piano), John B. Williams (bass), Roy McCurdy, Nancy Wilson (vocals); in concert; album shared with various bands
1983	Moment to Moment	Soul Note	Curtis Fuller, Mickey Tucker (piano), Ray Drummond (bass), Albert Heath
1983	Nostalgia	Baystate	Curtis Fuller, Mickey Tucker, Rufus Reid (bass), Billy Hart (drums)
1986	Back to the City	Contemporary	Curtis Fuller, Mickey Tucker, Ray Drummond, Marvin 'Smitty' Smith (drums)
1986	Real Time	Contemporary	Personnel as on Back to the City
