= Black Women Oral History Project =

The Black Women Oral History Project consists of interviews with 72 African American women from 1976 to 1981, conducted under the auspices of the Schlesinger Library of Radcliffe College, now Radcliffe Institute for Advanced Study.

== Project background ==
Beginning in 1977, Ruth Edmonds Hill coordinated and devoted herself to the completion of the project and to creating awareness of the rich information contained in the transcripts. The project began with the goal of capturing the lives and stories of women of African descent, many already in their 70s, 80s and 90s. On the recommendation of Dr. Letitia Woods Brown, professor of history at George Washington University, and with funding secured from the Rockefeller Foundation, the project began to address what Brown noted as inadequate documentation of the stories of African-American women in the Schlesinger Library and at other centers for research.

The project sought a cross section of women who had made significant contributions to American society in the first half of the twentieth century. Many interviewees had professional careers in such fields as education, government, the arts, business, medicine, law and social work. Others combined care for their families with volunteer work at the local, regional, or national level. Most of the interviews explored topics such as family background, education and training, employment, voluntary activities, and family and personal life. The intention was to give the interviewee the opportunity to explore and reflect on the influences and events that shaped her life.

== Participants ==
Among the participants were Melnea Cass, Zelma George, Dorothy Height, Queen Mother Moore, Rosa Parks, Esther Mae Scott, Muriel S. Snowden, and Dorothy West.

Volume 2 of the published work features conversations with Sadie Alexander, Elizabeth Barker, and Etta Moten Barnett.

Volume 3 includes interviews with Juanita Craft, Alice Dunnigan, and Eva B. Dykes, while Volume 10 features Charleszetta Waddles, Dorothy West, and Addie Williams.

All of the interviews are open for research with digitized materials, with the exception of the following: Merze Tate whose interview is not yet complete and five interviews that remain closed until 2027: Kathleen Adams, Margaret Walker Alexander, Lucy Miller Mitchell, Ruth Janetta Temple, and Era Bell Thompson.

Name	Year(s)	Note
Jessie Abbott	1977	Wife of Cleve Abbott; secretary to Margaret M. Washington, Jennie B. Moton, and George W. Carver
Christia Adair	1977	Suffragist and civil rights worker
Frankie V. Adams	1977	Atlanta-based educator, activist, and author
Kathleen Adams	1976, 1977	One of the first black supervisors in Atlanta's public schools
Frances M. Albrier	1977, 1978	Civil rights activist and community leader
Margaret Walker	1977	Poet and novelist
Sadie Alexander	1977	One of the first three black women in the United States ever to receive a Ph.D.
Elizabeth C. Barker	1976, 1977	One of the Cardozo Sisters; granddaughter of Francis L. Cardozo; niece of Meta Vaux Warrick Fuller
Etta Moten Barnett	1985	Opera star and actress
Norma Boyd	1976	Educator, co-founder of Alpha Kappa Alpha
Melnea Cass	1977	Civil rights activist
May Chinn	1979	Physician
Juanita Craft	1977	Civil rights activist
Clara Dickson	1978	Mashpee, Massachusetts community activist
Alice Dunnigan	1977	Journalist
Alfreda Duster	1978	Social worker; daughter of Ida B. Wells
Eva Dykes	1977	One of the first three black women in the United States to receive a Ph.D.
Mae Eberhardt	1979	Trade unionist
Florence Edmonds	1980	Nurse and trainer of nurses
Lena Edwards	1977	Physician and educator; recipient of the Presidential Medal of Freedom
Dorothy Ferebee	1979	Obstetrician and civil rights activist
Minnie Fisher	1979	Teacher, lifelong resident of Mound Bayou, Mississippi
Katherine Flippin	1977, 1978	Head Start organizer
Virginia Gayton	1977	Granddaughter of Lewis G. Clarke, on whom the character of George Harris is based in Uncle Tom's Cabin
Zelma George	1978	Musicologist, actress
Frances Grant	1977	Teacher at the Bordentown School and Fieldston School
Ardie C. Halyard	1978	Banker, first woman president of the Milwaukee NAACP
Pleasant Harrison	1979	Granddaughter of slave; craftswoman; built her own home
Anna A. Hedgeman	1978, 1979	Civil rights leader
Dorothy Height	1974, 1975, 1976	Educator and civil rights activist
Beulah Hester	1978	Boston social worker, graduate of Simmons College
May Hill	1978	Social worker; wife of Daniel Hill, theologian at Howard University; mother of Daniel G. Hill
Margaret C. Holmes	1977	One of the Cardozo Sisters; wife of Eugene C. Holmes, chairman of the philosophy department at Howard University
Clementine Hunter	1979	First black artist to exhibit at the New Orleans Museum of Art
Ellen S. Jackson	1978, 1979	Boston school desegregation pioneer
Fidelia Johnson	1976	Teacher; daughter of Grambling State University founder Charles P. Adams
Lois Mailou Jones	1977	Painter
Susie Jones	1977	Wife of Bennett College president David Dallas Jones,
Virginia L. Jones	1978	Librarian and educator
Hattie Kelly	1976	Dean of women at the Tuskegee Institute; studied under Booker T. Washington
Maida S. Kemp	1977	Labor organizer
Flemmie Kittrell	1977	Nutrionist
Abna Lancaster	1978	Graduate of Shaw University; instructor at Livingstone College; daughter of Achimota College co-founder James Aggrey
Eunice R. Laurie	1977	Nurse and trainer of nurses
Catherine C. Lewis	1980	One of the Cardozo Sisters
Inabel Lindsay	1977	First dean of the Howard University School of Social Work
Miriam Matthews	1977	Librarian and historian
Eliza McCabe	1977	Clubwoman, music teacher, member of Woman's Christian Temperance Union
Lucy M. Mitchell	1977	Pioneer in early childhood education
Audley Moore	1978	Civil rights leader and black nationalist
Annie Nipson	1978	Domestic worker from North Carolina; migrant to the North
Rosa Parks	1978	Civil rights leader
Rucker Sisters	1977	Granddaughters of Georgia politician Jefferson Long
Esther Mae Scott	1977	Singer, musician, and composer
Julia Smith	1978	Schoolteacher; donated hundreds of photographs to the Museum of Afro-American History
Muriel S. Snowden	1977	Founder of Freedom House
Olivia P Stokes	1979	Educator; the first African-American woman to receive a doctorate in Religious Education
Ann Tanneyhill	1978	Active in the National Urban League from 1930 to 1971
Merze Tate	1978, 1979	History professor at Howard University; expert on international relations
Ruth Temple	1978	First black women to practice medicine in California
Constance Thomas	1977	Dancer, American Negro Theatre performer, speech therapist
Era Bell Thompson	1978	Editor of Ebony magazine
Mary Thompson	1977	Massachusetts dentist, humanitarian, NAACP branch co-founder
Bazoline Usher	1977	Teacher at Booker T. Washington High School; Georgia Women of Achievement inductee
Charleszetta Waddles	1980	Activist, Pentecostal minister, and humanitarian
Dorothy West	1978	Harlem Renaissance writer; friend of Langston Hughes, Claude McKay, and others
Addie Williams	1977, 1978	Schoolteacher; daughter of slaves
Frances Harriet Williams	1977	Civil rights activist
Ozeline Wise	1978	Linotype operator; sister of Satyra Bennett, a Cambridge civic leader
Deborah Wolfe	1979	Educator, author, president of the National Alliance of Black School Educators
Arline Yarbrough	1977	Clubwoman; founder of a black historical society

== Methodology ==
The interviews were recorded on audiotape and transcribed and each interviewee was given an opportunity to edit and correct the transcript prior to the final printing. Both the transcripts and audiotapes have been archived and preserved at the Schlesinger Library. Copies of these materials are also held in the Sophia Smith Collection at Smith College and include the published guide to the transcripts; also the summary of each woman's life and highlights of topics from their interviews, as well as an index. Furthermore, the interviews and transcripts have been digitized and are available from the Schlesinger Library collection through the Black Women Oral History Project finding aid.

== Related projects ==
In 1981, Judith Sedwick offered to create portraits of a few of the interviewees, and later, with additional grant funding, photographed many more. The result is a collection of stunning photographs, which became a traveling exhibition, first shown in 1984 at the New York Public Library. All of these photographs are also catalogued at Harvard's Visual Information Access (VIA) database and available to view as a collection under "Black Women Oral History".
