= Ruth Edmonds Hill =

American scholar and educator

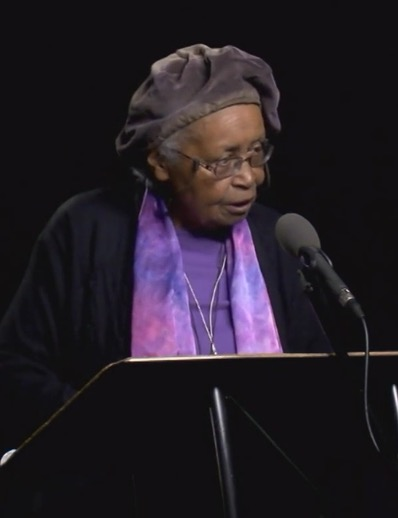
- Ruth Edmonds Hill in 2015
- Born: Ruth Edmonds
- Other names: Sister Ruth
- Occupation(s): Scholar, oral historian, oral storytelling editor, journal editor, educator, historic preservation advocate
- Spouse: Brother Blue

Ruth Edmonds Hill (March 5, 1925 – April 15, 2023) was an American scholar, oral historian, oral storytelling editor, journal editor, educator, and historic preservation advocate. Her oral history office is part of the Radcliffe Institute for Advanced Study at Harvard University. She is an iconic figure among oral storytellers, particularly in the United States but also abroad, and has advised storytellers' organizations. Her spouse is Dr. Hugh Morgan Hill who is also known as Brother Blue. Ruth Edmonds Hill is sometimes known as Sister Ruth. Ruth Edmonds Hill is the daughter of Florence Edmonds of western Massachusetts, whose life story is chronicled and has been critically analyzed as part of African-American oral history. Hill has degrees from Simmons College and the University of Massachusetts Amherst.

Hill is most widely known among oral history researchers for conducting the Black Women Oral History Project at the Arthur and Elizabeth Schlesinger Library on the History of American Women at the Radcliffe Institute for Advanced Study which has often been cited within related fields of study in journal articles, dissertations, and in panel discussions and has been acclaimed as a pioneering work in its genre.

Hill has also made oral history field recordings, including guided interviews, of Cambodians, Chinese Americans and other ethnic and sociolect communities, traveling widely in research as well as conference participation.

After the death of her husband Brother Blue in 2009, Ruth Edmonds Hill hosted Memorial Tributes in the Blue Circle community of artists, ministers and educators formed during his lifetime and from his joint opus with Ruth Edmonds Hill, most recently in 2010.

== Personal genealogy and historic conservation ==
In addition to being the daughter of health care specialist Florence Edmonds (1889–1983) of Pittsfield, Massachusetts, who was later chosen to be among the subjects of the Black Women Oral History Project which Ruth Edmonds Hill conducted, Hill is the great-granddaughter of Reverend Samuel Harrison (born April 15, 1818, Philadelphia, Pennsylvania, to enslaved parents, died August 11, 1900, Pittsfield, Massachusetts), pastor of the Second Congregational Church in Pittsfield and of Sanford Street Congregational Church (now St. John's Congregational Church) in Springfield, Massachusetts, who successfully crusaded to obtain equal pay for black soldiers serving in the Union Army during the Civil War.

Reverend Harrison served as chaplain of the 54th Massachusetts Volunteer Infantry, the first all-black infantry regiment to see action in the Civil War, whose exploits were dramatized in the motion picture Glory. Reverend Harrison also served as Chaplain of the W.W. Rockwell Post of the Grand Army of the Republic.

In May 2004, Ruth Edmonds Hill and her husband, Brother Blue, met with Pittsfield residents interested in conserving, as a historic site, the modest 19th century Samuel Harrison House at 82 Third Street in the Morningside neighborhood (plot purchased by Harrison 1852 for $50, house completed and occupied by the Harrison family fall 1858) which was Reverend Harrison's homestead. The City of Pittsfield had moved to demolish the structure, which was in poor condition. Hill petitioned the Massachusetts Historical Commission, citing her great-grandfather's works and "lifelong pioneering spirit," and the Commission denied the City's motion for demolition. The Samuel Harrison Society's preservation initiative gained support as a consequence of the documentary A Trumpet at the Walls of Jericho: The Untold Story of Samuel Harrison by filmmaker Mike Kirk which PBS television aired in February, 2005. Congressman John Olver secured a Save America’s Treasures matching grant of $246,000 for the Samuel Harrison Society, starting endowment of the preservation project, and the initiative which Hill had placed into historic conservation procedures resulted in the Samuel Harrison House being designated a National Register of Historic Places landmark on March 22, 2006, a National Park Service "Save America’s Treasures" Preservation Project, and a Massachusetts Historical Commission Preservation Project. On August 22, 2008, Ruth Edmonds Hill participated in groundbreaking ceremonies to mark the official start of renovation work on the Samuel Harrison House. After renovations costing $500,000, the house's new function became that of a black museum.

== The Black Women Oral History Project ==
In the mid 1970s, the Radcliffe College Schlesinger Library on the History of Women in America responded to recommendations that selected memoirs of older living black women be collected and made available by opening The Black Women Oral History Project. Ruth Edmonds Hill and a team of black oral history interviewers recorded 71 subjects from 1976 to 1981, with work continuing after these first case studies.

=== Subjects of the Black Women Oral History Project ===
Some oral histories published or exhibited by Ruth Edmonds Hill as part of the Black Women Oral History Project at the Schlesinger Library, which houses the archives of their recorded and vita materials, include those of:

- Frances Mary Albrier (September 21, 1898 – August 21, 1987), civil rights activist, union organizer
- Florence Edmonds (March 27, 1889 – December 1, 1983), health care specialist, Pittsfield, Massachusetts, US
- Fidelia O. Johnson, Master's in Home Economics, University of Iowa (1945)
- Maida Springer Kemp (born 1910), labor leader and consultant, women's and civil rights activist
- Era Bell Thompson, journalist and editor born in Iowa, BA Morningside College, Sioux City, Iowa
- Margaret Walker, MA English (1940), Ph.D English (1965), her dissertations representing the first versions of her book of poetry, For My People, and her novel, Jubilee

Subsequently, the lives and statements of these subjects are individually treated in literature secondary to the Black Women Oral History Project's reports.

== Publications and exhibitions ==
- Black Women Oral History Project: From the Arthur and Elizabeth Schlesinger Library on the History of Women in America, [at that time part of] Radcliffe College by Ruth Edmonds Hill (1992), hardcover, Univ Pubns of Amer, ISBN 0-88736-611-2 (0-88736-611-2)
- Women of Courage exhibition (University of Iowa, September – October 1991) curated by Marianne Ryan, Christine Tade, and William Welburn, with assistance from Pamela Spitzmueller. Reprised and extended, regarding individuals in Iowa history, Women of Courage: An Exhibition of Photographs curated by Judith Sedwick, Ruth Edmonds Hill (1984)
- Black Women Oral History Project: From the Arthur and Elizabeth Schlesinger Library on the History of American Women, [at that time part of] Radcliffe College by Ruth Edmonds Hill (1991), hardcover, Walter De Gruyter Inc, ISBN 0-88736-615-5 (0-88736-615-5)and several other similar editions.
- Guide to the Transcripts of the Black Women Oral History Project by Arthur and Elizabeth Schlesinger Library on the History of Women in America, Ruth Edmonds Hill, Patricia Miller King (K G Saur Verlag edition 31 Aug 1990), Hardcover, Univ. of Pennsylvania Pr, ISBN 0-88736-681-3 (0-88736-681-3)
- Dialog between Ruth Edmonds Hill and Dr. Hugh Morgan Hill (Brother Blue) mediated by Louise Stewart
- Women of Courage: An Exhibition of Photographs book by Judith Sedwick, Ruth Edmonds Hill, introductory essay by Linda M. Perkins (Radcliffe College: Arthur and Elizabeth Schlesinger Library on the History of Women in America: Black Women Oral History Project, illustrated, 1984)
- Women of Courage: An Exhibition of Photographs exhibition curated by Judith Sedwick, Ruth Edmonds Hill, Black Women Oral History Project, at the Arthur and Elizabeth Schlesinger Library on the History of Women in America (photographs from 1981, Schlesinger library than US touring exhibit, 1984)

== Honors ==
- The Oral History Review, an Oxford University journal, Editorial Board Member, (2000s–2011 and current)
- Brother Blue was a 2009 recipient of the W. E. B. Du Bois Medal from the W. E. B. Du Bois Research Institute at Harvard University, named for W. E. B. Du Bois, the first African American to earn a Harvard PhD in 1895. Brother Blue's award was accepted posthumously on his behalf by his spouse, Ruth Edmonds Hill on December 4, 2009, a bare month after his death, for what Henry Louis Gates Jr. cited as "his desire to build a better world, one story at a time.
- League for the Advancement of New England Storytelling (LANES) Brother Blue (Hugh Morgan Hill) and Ruth Hill Award is an annual award named for Brother Blue and Ruth Hill and honoring extraordinary commitment to and support of storytelling and storytellers.
- Samuel Harrison Society, Board of Trustees (2000s–2011 and current)
