= Brother Blue =

American storyteller, educator, actor, and minister

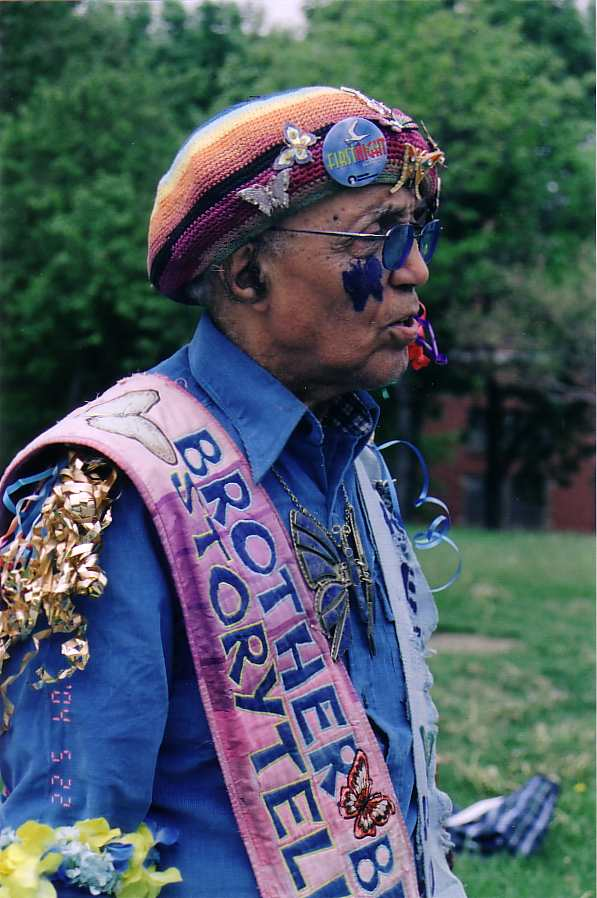
- Photo by Pete Lee
- Born: Hugh Morgan Hill; July 12, 1921; Cleveland, Ohio, U.S.
- Died: November 3, 2009 (aged 88); Cambridge, Massachusetts, U.S.
- Education: Harvard University (BA); Yale University (MFA); Union Institute and University (PhD)
- Occupations: Storyteller; actor; educator
- Spouse: Ruth Edmonds
- Website: www.brotherblue.com

Hugh Morgan Hill (July 12, 1921 – November 3, 2009), also known as Brother Blue, was an American educator, storyteller, actor, musician, and street performer based principally in the Boston area. After serving as First Lieutenant from 1943 to 1946 in the segregated United States Army in World War II and being honorably discharged, he received a BA from Harvard College in 1948 (cum laude in Social Relations), was accepted into the Harvard Graduate School of Arts and Sciences (GSAS) before transferring to receive a MFA from the Yale School of Drama and a Ph.D. from the Union Institute. While performing frequently at U.S. National Storytelling Festivals and flown abroad by organizations and patrons from England to Russia and the Bahamas, Brother Blue regularly performed on the streets around Cambridge, most notably in Harvard Square. He was the Official Storyteller of Boston and of Cambridge by resolutions of both city councils.

Brother Blue was a 2009 recipient of the W. E. B. Du Bois Medal from the W. E. B. Du Bois Research Institute at Harvard University, named for W. E. B. Du Bois, the first African American to earn a Harvard PhD in 1895. Brother Blue's award was accepted posthumously on his behalf by his spouse, Ruth Edmonds Hill, oral historian at the Radcliffe Institute for Advanced Study at Harvard University, on December 4, 2009."

== Youth and early career ==
Hill was born in Cleveland, Ohio. Raised in the boisterous revivalist African Methodist Episcopal church of the 1920s and 1930s, he was the grandson of a slave who heard tales of his grandfather's slavery from his father, a devout Christian. The Hills lived in a poor area in Cleveland, Ohio where they were one of few black families. Brother Blue recalled his childhood as a rough time, saying "I'm like a flower who grew up in rocky soil." During Sunday church services, Blue found his voice telling stories, carrying this art forward into Sunday school sessions he taught after prayer.

Entering Harvard on scholarship, Brother Blue won the undergraduate Boylston Prize for his recital of a speech penned and originally orated by Haitian slave rebellion leader Toussaint L'Ouverture. He subsequently won the Walt Whitman International Media Competition for delivering selections from The Autobiography of Malcolm X. Inspired by American Civil Liberties attorney Clarence Darrow of Scopes Trial, son of an abolitionist family, Brother Blue initially intended to apply to law school in order to become "the black Clarence Darrow." However his storytelling calling brought him successfully to Yale School of Drama's graduate school instead before obtaining his doctorate in Divinity from the Union Institute.

== Iconography ==
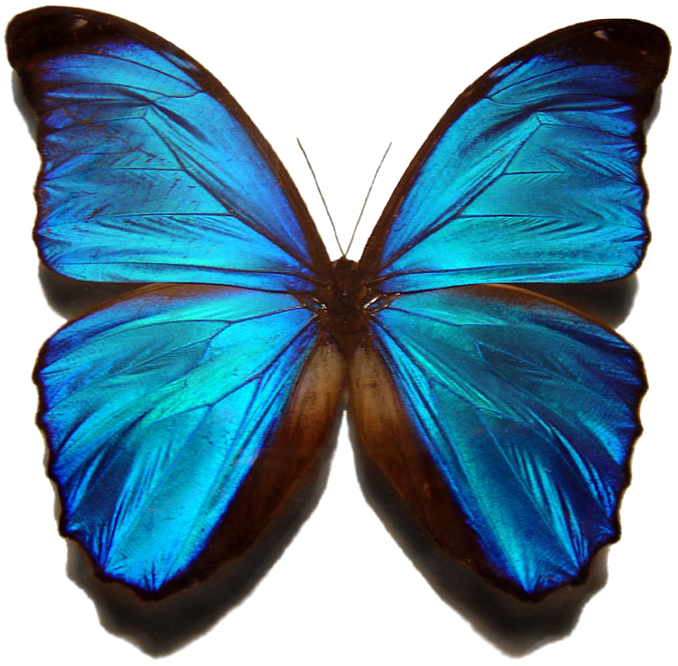
Morpho menelaus blue butterfly

Brother Blue and Ruth's ubiquitous symbol is the blue butterfly, inspired by the blue morpho native to South America. The story of a caterpillar's struggles, hopes and dreams and metamorphosis into a butterfly was one of Brother Blue's signature motifs. Brother Blue also acknowledged the butterfly's ancient Greek association with the psyche. Blue's clothing was often covered in butterfly medallions and blue butterflies were frequently painted on his cheeks and the palms of his hands, sometimes even drawn on with a ballpoint pen. In the later part of his career, Brother Blue constantly wore a broad, breast-plate-sized medallion around his neck which was one of many butterfly-themed gifts with which people expressed their appreciation and affection for the Hills. Brother Blue's publications, media jackets, festival banners, ornamental staff, and stages were also frequently decorated with butterflies. In his role as Merlin in the 1981 George A. Romero film Knightriders, blue butterflies can be seen as the camera zooms in on his hands as they wave goodbye during a funeral which he officiates in the film.

Brother Blue wore a predominantly blue ensemble, sporting blue turtlenecks or collared shirts and blue pants. He frequently wore a blue beret on which butterfly pins, some with rhinestones or sea opals, were affixed. He wore a sash emblazoned with "BROTHER BLUE STORYTELLER" in his capacity as Official Storyteller of Cambridge, Massachusetts. Ribbons laced his shoulders, arms, elbows, wrists, knees, and ankles and he was known to carry bright blue balloons. Inspired by Judaic, Vedic, African traditions, he often appeared barefoot or would take off his shoes in the early course of a performance to touch earth as sacred ground.

Brother Blue's 2002 business card read "Storyteller, Street Poet, Soul Theater".

== Opus ==
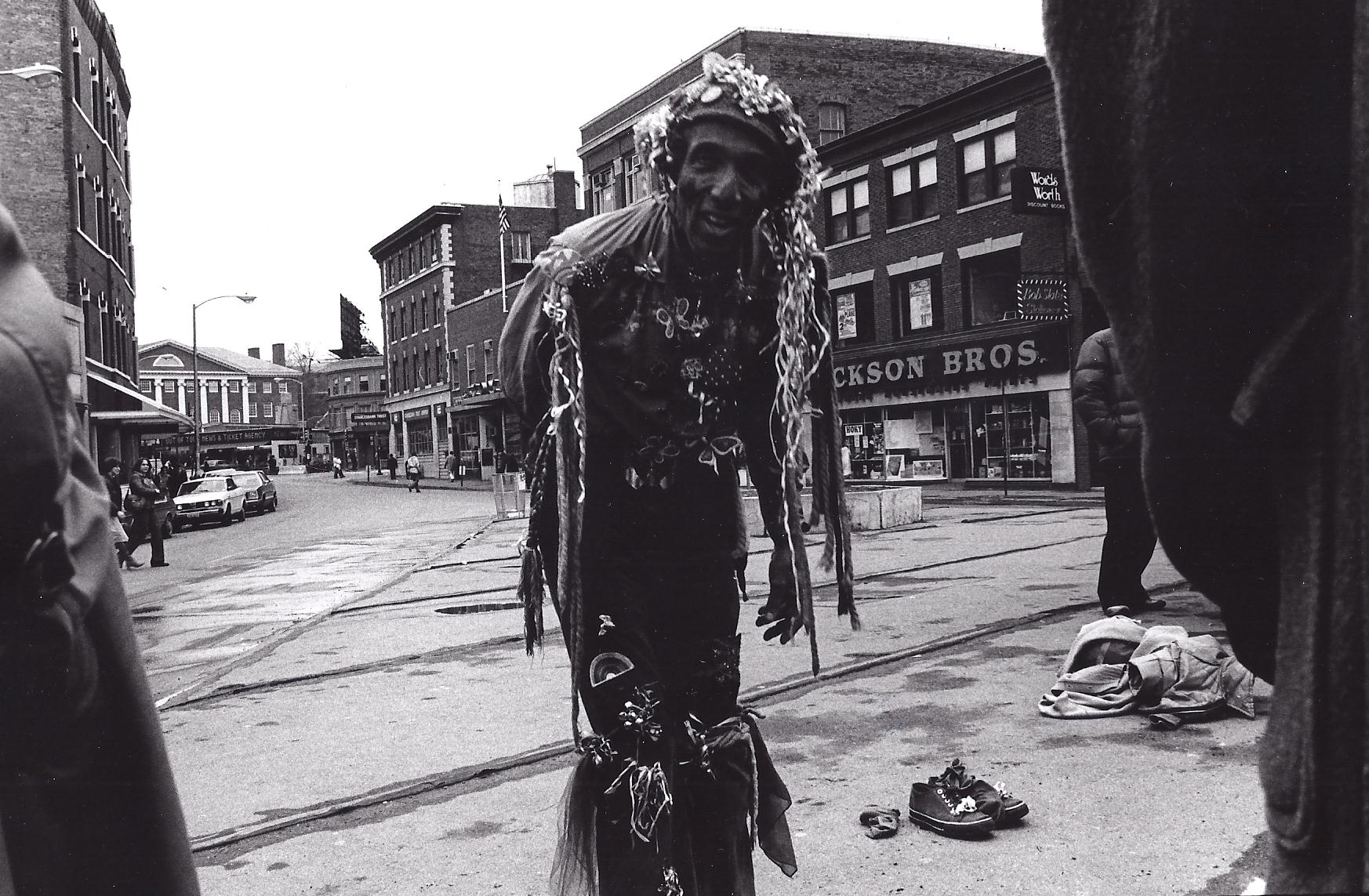
Brother Blue performing in Harvard Square circa 1979

"From the middle of the middle of me," Brother Blue would say, twirling his finger in the air and tapping it on a listener's heart, "to the middle of the middle of you ..." as part of his traditional opening. He would continue, "I am older than the oldest stories, I am the storyteller." A signature story which gave form to one face of this archetypal "storyteller" from Blue is his tale of Muddy Duddy, a fictional musician who could hear the sound of a harp coming out of the earth.

Brother Blue's unique style of storytelling made extensive use of rhyme, rhythm, and improvisation. He referred to himself as a street poet and, alluding to Saint Francis of Assisi, as "God's fool". He told idiosyncratic versions of Shakespeare's King Lear, "The Big O, Othell-O" and Romeo and Juliet, a variety of self-mythologizing autobiographical stories, and his signature story about a caterpillar's first vision of a butterfly. American theater director Peter Sellars (Harvard College Class of 1981) cast Brother Blue as an idiosyncratic actor in updated classical productions in such venues as The American Repertory Theater.

As an educator, Brother Blue taught at the Episcopal Divinity School and Harvard Divinity School, with Ruth Hill through the Harvard Storytelling Workshop in venues across Harvard University's campus, on television through WGBH, and in a later, more casual forum, Storytelling with Brother Blue.

Predominant themes in Brother Blue's performance and teaching were birth, love, anguish, death, ugliness, impairment, imprisonment, divinity, freedom, imagination, and the discontent which transforms social roles. He drew thematic inspiration from ancient story cycles, African and Franco-Welsh legend, Shakespeare, modern jazz interpretations, and improvisation.

These themes were often embodied by picaresque characters, though Blue also utilized high-status characters such as Othello or unnamed archetypal personalities such as the Old Storyteller or This Little Girl or Someone Who's Somewhere Everywhere.

=== Teaching and story coaching philosophy ===
Brother Blue's refusal to assign grades to graduate students in his university courses was a source of controversy. He formally espoused an ethic of not "criticizing" in the usual sense, but instead "appreciating" and "saying thank you" in response to performances he proctored, coached, or judged. This stance was in line with a liberal humanist understanding of oral storytelling critique, which was expanded on later in Blue's lifetime by Doug Lipman's guidelines for Story Dynamics coaching, Jay O'Callahan, and others among Brother Blue's League for the Advancement of New England Storytelling (LANES) colleagues who. Cautious of "the green dance" of pursuing wealth, Brother Blue eschewed the world of commerce as much as he rejected quantifying people's aptitude, explaining that he preferred to address people "in their wonderfulness".

Improvisation was a pervasive element in Brother Blue's performances and one of the chief skills he encouraged in his students. "I call it cosmic jazz. I don't repeat myself, I don't write it down, you can't get it in a book, in a book" he said (2008).

In the early and middle parts of his career, Brother Blue practiced Calling the Muse to open any gathering of storytellers or storytelling.

=== Tradition strands ===
==== Universal traditions ====
Brother Blue believed that telling stories is a divine calling. "I think I was anointed to be a storyteller—I mean touched by the fire," he said. "I can tell stories in my sleep and blow the world away!" Stating that he was "working on greatness!" he described what he sought from everyone as "stories to change the world". He declared that "Love will overcome all in this world. Love's gonna win. Nothing can stop this. There will be these fools that come along, and I don't mind being that fool, who is trying to express that. I have this madness—volition—this chosen madness to believe that I can change this world". "Storytelling is a sacred art," he emphasized. "And the irony of it is that most people—if you say that—back away. They want to be amused mostly, or have a way of passing a little time. Not Blue. Even when I'm trying to be funny, I'm trying to give you my soul. That's strong".

==== Music and song and the European bardic tradition ====
Brother Blue's chief musical instruments were harmonica and human voice, and occasionally tambourine, and drums. He also made music with a set of genuine early American slave chains in a signature story he developed during his time as a Divinity School teaching fellow. Finger snapping, stomping and dancing, often barefoot, are featured in many of his performances.

At Harvard, Brother Blue studied under Albert Bates Lord who, with Milman Parry, compared the oral storytelling methods of surviving contemporary Slavic and Eastern Mediterranean bardic storytellers with the language and content and literary formats of the Homeric epics, concluding that Homeric works derived from or were transcribed out of oral storytelling forms, as ultimately documented in The Singer of Tales (1960) Other academic influences included global mythography through the work of Marija Gimbutas and Joseph Campbell which Brother Blue addressed in his training of others. Albert Lord's 1954 class also led Herbert Mason to write his intensely personal Gilgamesh, A Verse Narrative (1970) as Mason's young friend lay deathly ill, and which was narrated for accompaniment to the international museum exhibit, Treasures of the Royal Tombs of Ur, with dedication to both Mason and the Hills by a student of Brother Blue and Ruth Hill as Gilgamesh: God King of Sumer, The Oldest Story in the World, along with Diane Wolkstein's portrayal of Inanna. Brother Blue also advised a live, partially extemporaneous performance of the Gilgamesh and Inanna cycle for this exhibit at the Bowers Museum in Santa Ana, California.

Professor Albert Lord said that Brother Blue was "sui generis", meaning in Latin "of a kind of his own" because Brother Blue "does not really belong to any particular tradition in storytelling" but is "a phenomenon in himself".

European figures referenced in Brother Blue's opus include: Albert Einstein, Homer, Virgil, Dante, William Shakespeare and particularly St. Francis of Assisi and Don Quixote, to whose life stories he would compare his, his colleagues' and his audiences' works and lives. "I bring Homer to the streets. I bring Sophocles," he said. "To tell stories, you should know Chaucer. You should know Shakespeare. You should know Keats. You have to be constantly reading. You read, you think, you create. You have to know the new moves: You must be able to rap and be able to sing the blues!".

==== United States pan-cultural traditions ====
United States historical and cultural figures referenced in Brother Blue's opus include: Bob Dylan, John Coltrane and Robert F. Kennedy. Brother Blue said he wanted to be "the black Clarence Darrow," which is why he had intended to go to law school before finding his calling at Yale School of Drama.

==== African-American and African traditions ====
African-American and African-related motifs referenced in Brother Blue's opus include: "a chicken with a busted wing", lions, elephants, Dr. Martin Luther King Jr., B.B. King. Blue spoke about skin color and racial issues, and his own experience of being African American.

Brother Blue was frequently featured by the U.S. National Association of Black Storytellers and is frequently referenced by the U.S. griot movement, spearheaded by oral storyteller griots such as Michael D. McCarty in Los Angeles, California, who are extending the original West African griot tradition.

== Awards ==
- W. E. B. Du Bois Medal, 2009
- National Storytelling Network Lifetime Achievement Award, 1999, "for sustained and exemplary contributions to storytelling in America". Steve Kardaleff, interim executive director of the U.S. National Storytelling Network introduced Brother Blue's award with "His mother is verse, rhythm and rhyme, and his father is reportedly inverse time." A nominator had described Brother GBlue as "a walking, talking, living legend".
- League for the Advancement of New England Storytelling (LANES) Brother Blue (Hugh Morgan Hill) and Ruth Hill Award, 2002, founding recipient, an annual award named for Brother Blue and Ruth Hill and honoring extraordinary commitment to and support of storytelling and storytellers. Brother Blue described this award's purpose as "To honor those who give their lives to storytelling to change the world."
- Cambridge Center for Adult Education Anne Bradstreet Lifetime Achievement Award, 2000 for "contributions to the poetry community".
- Cambridge, Massachusetts, USA Peace Commission Peace and Justice Award, 1999
- U.S. National Storytelling Association Circle of Excellence Award, 1996
- U.S. National Association of Black Storytellers Esteemed Elder, 1995
- U.S. National Association of Black Storytellers Zora Neale Hurston Award, 1986
- Boston Music Awards "Best of Boston" award for Best Street Performance, 1982
- Corporation for Public Broadcasting Local Programming Award, 1975
- WGBH Special Citation for Outstanding Solo Performance on Public Radio, for "Miss Wunderlich," which he told on "The Spider's Web" (WGBH, Boston), 1975
- Walt Whitman International Media Competition winner, circa 1940s, Poetry on Sound Tape award for delivering selections from The Autobiography of Malcolm X
- Boylston Prize, circa 1945 for recital of a speech by Haitian slave rebellion leader Toussaint L'Ouverture.
- Brother Blue was also posterboy for the Spoleto Festival USA in Charleston, South Carolina

== Performances and bibliography ==
- "Brother Blue: Storyteller" and similar program titles, Cambridge Community Television regular series and special features (live and recorded, 1980s–2000s)
- Brother Blue: A Narrative Portrait of Brother Blue a.k.a. Dr. Hugh Morgan Hill (Portrait Series) by Warren Lehrer (Bay Press, WA, October 1995, ISBN 978-0-941920-36-0) contains several of Brother Blue's stories conveyed through Warren's imaginative typesetting.
- "Miss Wunderlich" in Jump Up and Say: A Collection of Black Storytelling (Simon and Schuster, 1995) and in Homespun, Tales from America's Favorite Storytellers (Crown Publishers, 1988)
- "The Rainbow Child" in Spinning Tales, Weaving Hope (New Society Publishers, 1992)
- "The Butterfly" in Talk That Talk, an Anthology of African-American Storytelling (Simon and Schuster, 1989)
- New Age Conference, Florence, Italy (live, 1988)
- "Muddy Duddy" in The Wide World All Around (Longman, 1987)
- UNICEF pavilion, 1984 World's Fair, New Orleans, Louisiana (live, 1984)
- Merlin in Knightriders directed by George A. Romero (1981)
- New Age Conference, Florence, Italy (live, 1978)
- Official Storyteller, United Nations Habitat, Vancouver, British Columbia, Canada (live, 1976)
- Boston's First Night (live, 1974–2009)
- Lincoln Center Out-of-Doors, New York
- New York Folk Festival, New York
- Artscape, Baltimore, Maryland
- Civil Rights Museum, Memphis, Tennessee
- National Storytelling Festival, Jonesborough, Tennessee
- Africa in April, Memphis, Tennessee
- American Imagery Conference
- Sacred Dance Guild

Storytelling festivals include:

- Mariposa Festival, Toronto, Ontario, Canada
- Toronto Festival of Storytelling, Toronto, Ontario, Canada
- Vancouver Storytelling Festival, Vancouver, British Columbia, Canada
- Yukon Storytelling Festival, Yukon Territory, Canada
- Sharing the Fire, sponsored by the League for the Advancement of New England Storytelling
- Corn Island Storytelling Festival, Louisville, Kentucky
- In the Tradition... festival/conference of the U.S. National Association of Black Storytellers
