= Kathleen Adams =

Kathleen Adams may refer to:

- Kathleen M. Adams, American cultural anthropologist
- Kathleen Redding Adams (1890–1993), American teacher and member of the First Congregational Church in Atlanta
