= Elizabeth Barker =

Elizabeth Barker may refer to:

- Elisabeth Barker, English journalist, historian and civil servant
- Elizabeth Barker, Baroness Barker (born 1961), member of the House of Lords
- Elizabeth Cardozo Barker (1900–1981), founder of Cardozo Sisters Hairstylists
- Liz Barker (born 1975), English television presenter

== See also ==
- Elisabeth Barker (1910–1986), English journalist, historian and civil servant
