= Lucy Mitchell =

Lucy Mitchell may refer to:

- Lucy Miller Mitchell (1899–2002), American early childhood education specialist and community activist
- Lucy Myers Wright Mitchell (1845–1888), American writer, historian, and expert on ancient art
- Lucy Sprague Mitchell (1878–1967), American educator

== Fictional characters ==
- Lucy Mitchell, in the UK children's TV drama series Grange Hill, played by Belinda Crane
