= Juanita Craft Civil Rights House and Museum =

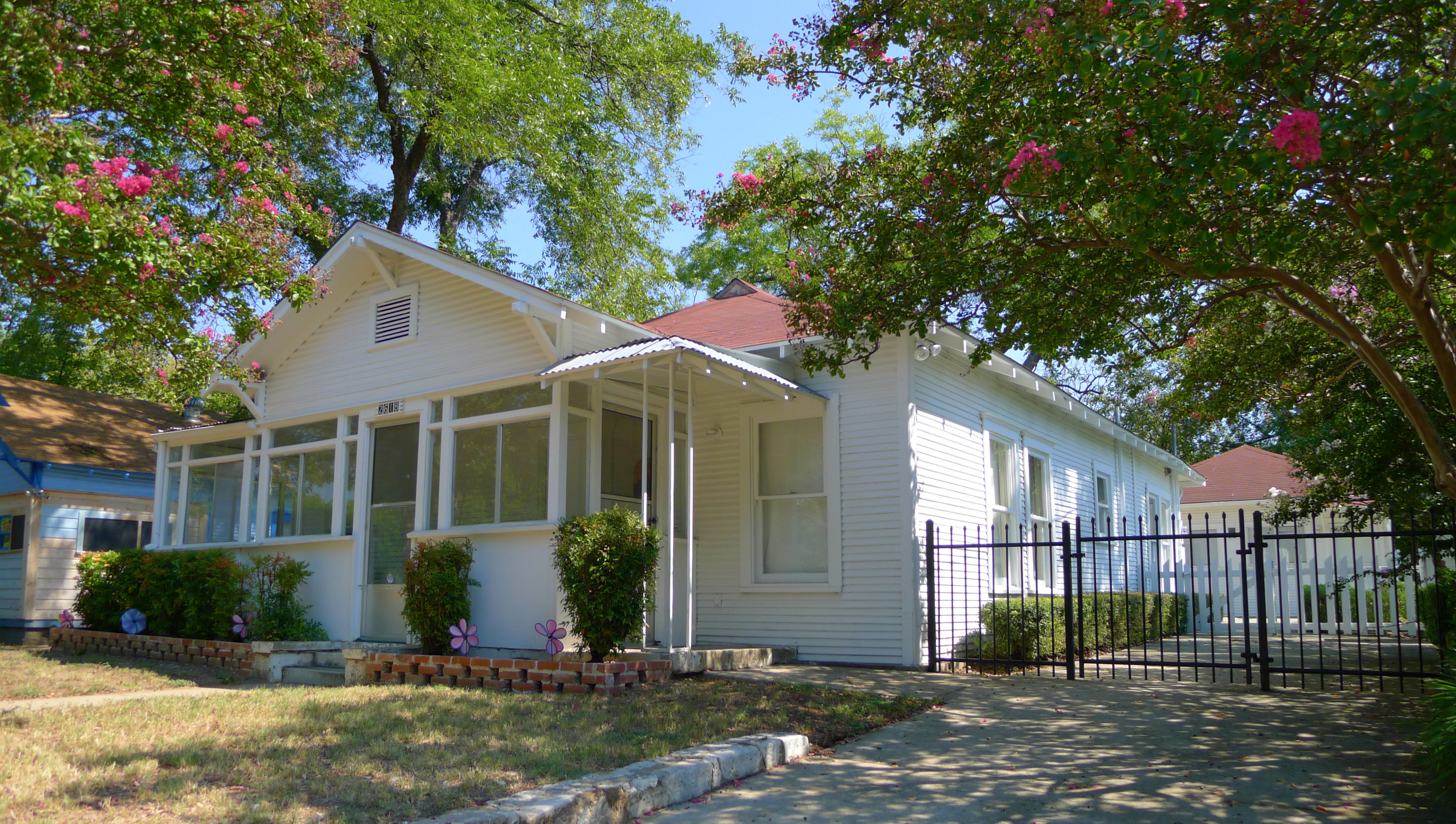
- Juanita Craft Civil Rights House
- Location: Dallas, Texas
- Restored: 2020-2023
- Website: friendsofjuanitacraft.org

The Juanita Craft Civil Rights House and Museum, (1930) is a historic house museum located at 2618 Warren Avenue in Dallas, Texas, USA. It is the former home of Juanita Craft, a Civil Rights leader, activist and politician. It is a designated Dallas City and Texas Landmark and is listed on the National Register of Historic Places.

The house opened as a public museum in May 2023.

== History ==
The Juanita Craft Civil Rights House and Museum was home to Juanita Craft, a civil rights leader who founded 182 NAACP chapters and helped lead efforts to integrate The University of Texas Law School and North Texas State University.

Craft was elected to Dallas City Council in 1973.

Her home was a meeting place for Civil Rights leaders. President Lyndon B. Johnson and Dr. Martin Luther King, Jr. visited her there.

Craft willed her home to the city of Dallas upon her death in 1985.

== Restoration and museum ==
The City of Dallas operated the house as a historic site starting in 1994. In 2018, while being converted into a museum, the house was damaged by a flood caused by a burst pipe. In 2020, The Junior League of Dallas announced a partnership with the City of Dallas and the Friends of the Juanita Craft Civil Rights House to help fund the costs to restore the house and open it as a museum. The project was also supported with grants from the National Park Service.

The Juanita Craft Civil Rights House and Museum opened to the public in 2023.
