= Lena Frances Edwards =

American doctor

Lena Frances Edwards Madison
- Edwards in 1980
- Born: September 17, 1900; Washington, DC, U.S.
- Died: December 3, 1986 (aged 86); Lakewood, New Jersey, U.S.
- Occupation: Physician
- Spouse: Keith Madison
- Awards: Presidential Medal of Freedom

Lena Frances Edwards (September 17, 1900 – December 3, 1986) was a New Jersey physician who was awarded the Presidential Medal of Freedom in 1964.

== Early life and education ==
Edwards was born in Washington, D.C., on September 17, 1900. She was the daughter of dentist and oral surgeon Thomas W. Edwards and Marie Coakley Edwards, a homemaker. Her father taught at the Howard University College of Dentistry.

Edwards was valedictorian of her class at Washington's Dunbar High School in 1917. She completed her undergraduate studies at Howard University in three years and graduated from Howard University Medical School in 1924. While at Howard, Edwards joined Delta Sigma Theta and served as chapter president from 1920 to 1921.

== Medical career ==
In 1925, Edwards and her husband moved to Jersey City, New Jersey, and each entered medical practice. She became a speaker on public health and a natural childbirth advocate while serving the European immigrant community of Hudson County, New Jersey. In 1931, she joined the staff of Margaret Hague Hospital in Jersey City, but she was not admitted to residency in obstetrics and gynecology there until 1945.

Edwards returned to Washington in 1954 and taught obstetrics at Howard University Medical School. She would not accept a position as department chair because of her religious objections to abortion. She was the medical adviser to the National Association of Colored Women's Clubs. She chaired the Maternal Welfare Committee of the District of Columbia Urban League.

At the age of 60, Edwards helped found Our Lady of Guadeloupe Maternity Clinic in Hereford, Texas, a mission serving Mexican migrant worker families. She donated more than a third of the money needed for the building's construction costs, and worked there without pay. She served at the mission until 1965 when a heart attack led her to leave and move back to Washington. She worked there at the Office of Economic Opportunity and Project Head Start until her retirement in 1970.

== Personal life ==
She and Keith Madison, a fellow student at the medical school, were married following their graduation. They had six children together between 1925 and 1939. Among their children, two became physicians, one a social worker, one an officer in the US Air Force, and one became a Catholic priest. She separated from Madison in 1947.

Edwards died in 1986 in Lakewood, New Jersey.

=== Religion ===
Edwards was a devout adherent of Catholicism. In 1947, she became a lay member of the Third Order of Saint Francis. Her son Thomas Madison joined the Franciscan Friars of the Atonement in 1953 taking the religious name Martin. He was ordained in 1962, and was the first African American priest to be ordained in the Society of the Atonement. Her work at Hereford was inspired at her son's seminary: After attending a Catholic Mass there, she said that she wanted to serve the poor when her children were grown. One of her son's classmates recommended that she visit Hereford. She went first for a long visit and later went back to build the clinic.

== Honors and legacy ==
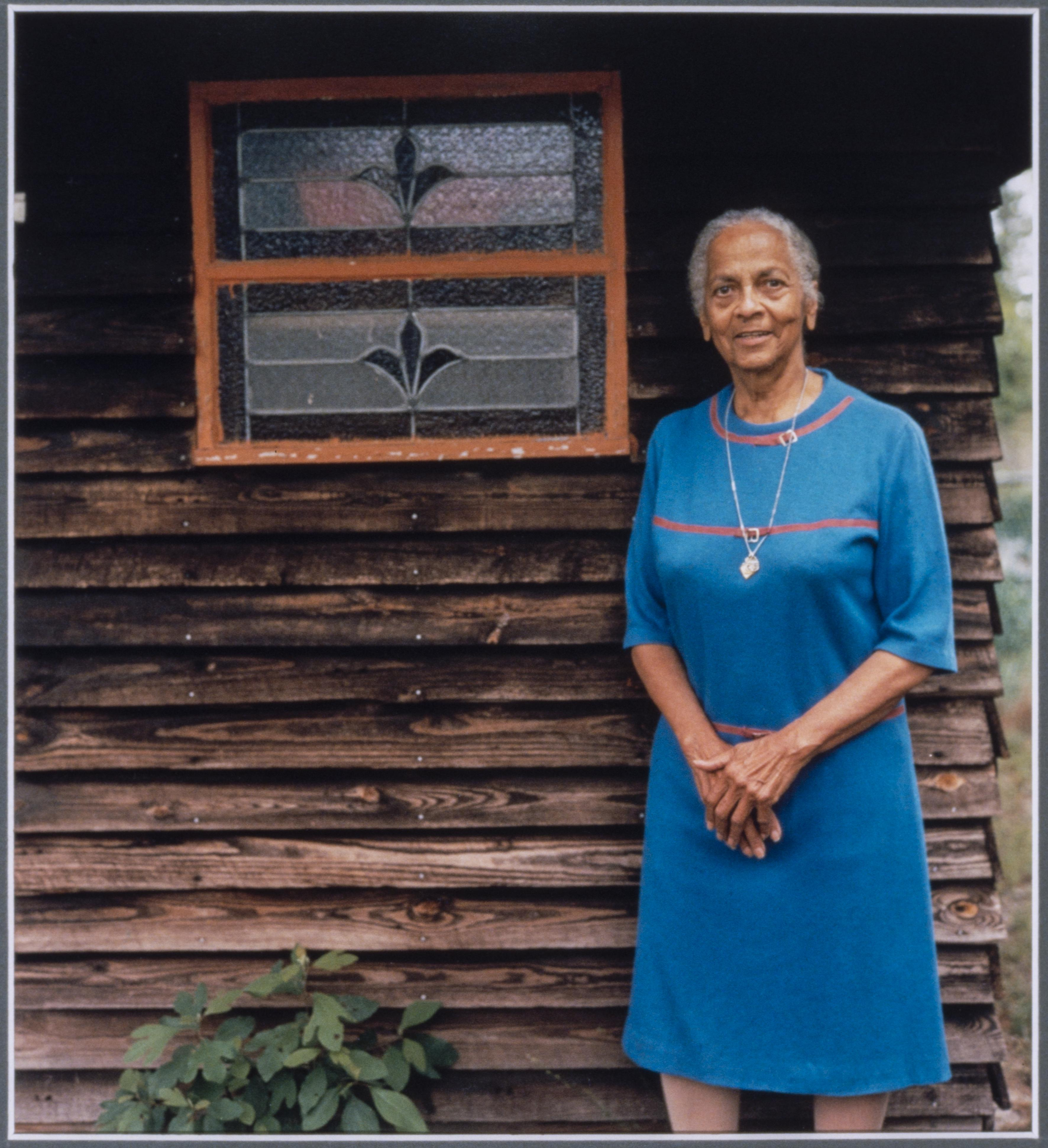
Lena Edwards when interviewed for the Black Women Oral History Project

Her service was recognized by Lyndon B. Johnson in 1964 when she was awarded the Presidential Medal of Freedom. In 1966, she received an honorary degree from Saint Peter's College, New Jersey. In 1967, she received the Poverello Medal.

She was a diplomate of the American Board of Obstetrics and Gynecology and a Fellow of the International College of Surgeons.

In 1955, she was named the Medical Woman of the Year by the New Jersey district of the American Medical Women's Association.
