= Juanita Craft =

American activist and politician

Juanita J. Craft
- Craft during her tenure as a city council member in Dallas, Texas, 1976.
- Born: Juanita Jewel Shanks; February 9, 1902; Round Rock, Texas, U.S.
- Died: August 6, 1985 (aged 83); Dallas, Texas, U.S.
- Occupations: Activist; politician
- Years active: 1935–1984
- Known for: Activist during the Civil Rights Movement
- Spouses: Charles Floyd Langham (m. 1921; div. 1925) Johnnie Edward Craft (m. 1937; died 1950)
- Awards: Eleanor Roosevelt Humanitarian Award (1984); NAACP Golden Heritage Life Membership Award (1978)

Juanita Craft (born Juanita Jewel Shanks; February 9, 1902 – August 6, 1985) was an American activist and politician. Craft was an activist in the civil rights movement and also served as a member of the Dallas City Council in Texas.

== Biography ==
Born in Round Rock, Texas, Craft was the only child of schoolteachers David Sylvestus (d. 1947) and Eliza Balfour Shanks (d. 1918). Craft was raised by her mother until she died in 1918. After her mother's death, Craft moved to Columbus, Texas to be with her father. After graduating high school in 1919, Craft attended Prairie View A&M University where she studied sewing and millinery. After two years at Prairie View, Craft moved back to Austin, Texas and received her teaching certificate from Samuel Huston College. By 1925, Craft was working as a maid at the Adolphus Hotel and later as a seamstress.

Craft joined the NAACP in 1935, eventually becoming the Dallas NAACP membership chairman in 1942 and the Texas NAACP field organizer in 1946. She helped to organize 182 branches of the NAACP over eleven years. In 1944, Craft became the first black woman in Dallas County to vote in a public election. In 1955, she organized a protest of the State Fair of Texas against its policy of admitting blacks only on "Negro Achievement Day." Craft also assisted in the organization of protests and pickets in segregated lunch counters, restaurants, theaters and public transportation.

Following the 1954 decision in Brown v. Board of Education, Craft worked to integrate the University of Texas Law School and the Dallas Independent School District. She attempted to help enroll the first black student at North Texas State College (Now the University of North Texas), a battle eventually won through litigation She later served two terms on the Dallas City Council from 1975 and 1979. Craft became a towering historic figure in the Civil Rights Movement in Texas, and was given many awards for her efforts, including the NAACP Golden Heritage Life Membership Award in 1978, the Eleanor Roosevelt Humanitarian Award in 1984, and she was recognized by the NAACP for her fifty years of service shortly before her death at the age of 83 on August 6, 1985.

== Legacy ==
The Juanita Jewel Craft Recreation Center and a Dallas city park were named in her honor as was a U.S. Post Office in southeast Dallas. Craft home on Warren Avenue in South Dallas is now the Juanita J. Craft Civil Rights House and is part of Dallas's Wheatley Place Historic District. Many historic figures, including Martin Luther King, Jr., and President Lyndon B. Johnson, climbed the wooden steps of its front porch to seek audience with Craft.

== Personal and awards ==
Craft was married twice, first to a childhood friend Charles Floyd Langham from 1921 to 1925. Craft's second marriage was to salesman and gambler Johnnie Edward Craft from 1937 until his death in 1950.

== Juanita Craft Civil Rights House and Museum ==
Craft willed her home to the City of Dallas upon her death in 1985.

The City of Dallas operated the house as a historic site starting in 1994. In 2018, while being converted into a museum, the house was damaged by a flood caused by a burst pipe. In 2020, The Junior League of Dallas announced a partnership with the City of Dallas and the Friends of the Juanita Craft Civil Rights House to help fund the costs to restore the house and open it as a museum. The project was also supported with grants from the National Park Service.

The Juanita Craft Civil Rights House and Museum opened to the public in 2023.
