= Ann Tanneyhill =

Ann (Anna) Elizabeth Tanneyhill
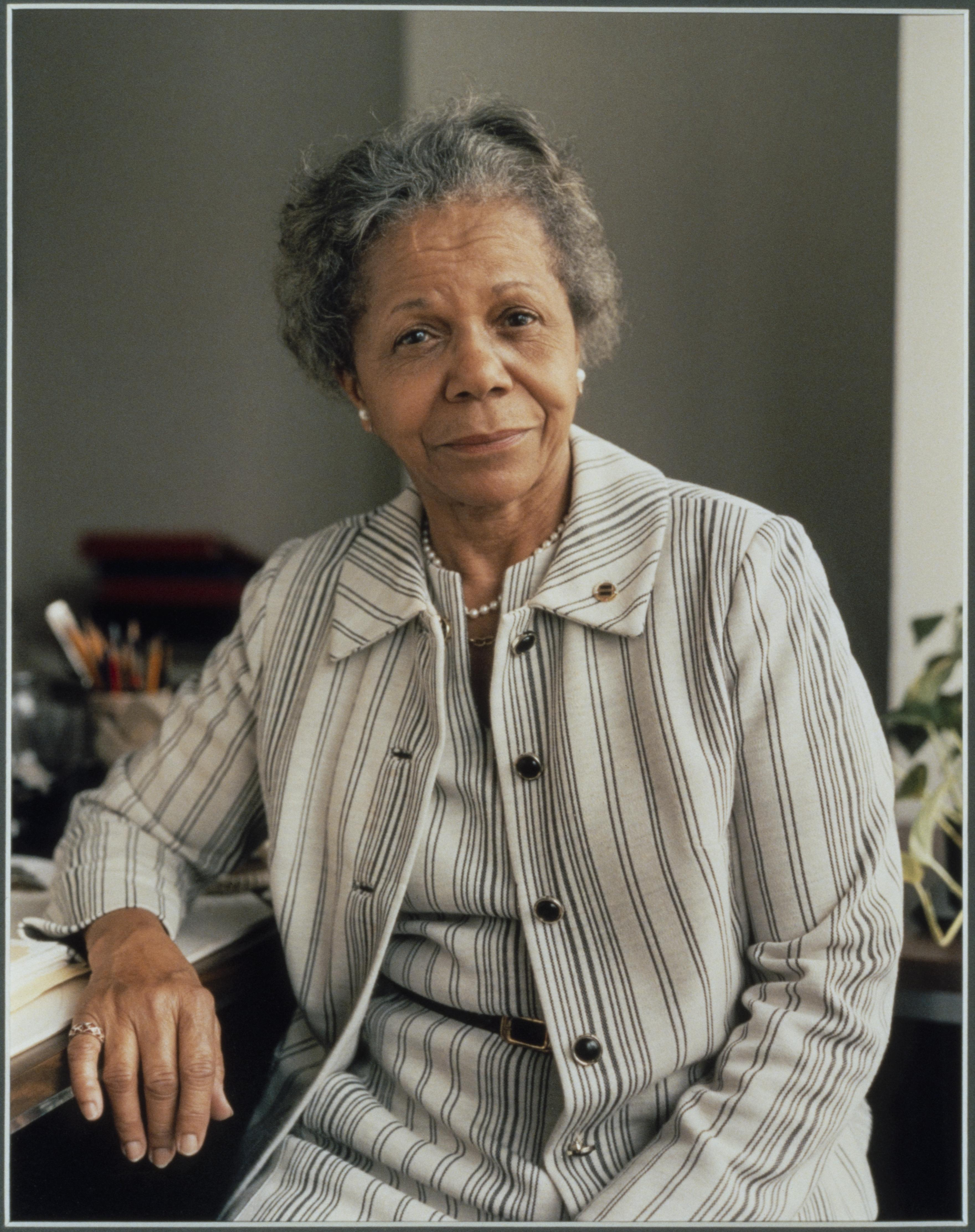
- Born: January 19, 1906; Norwood, Massachusetts
- Died: May 15, 2001 (aged 95); Mashpee, Massachusetts
- Education: B.S. Simmons College (1928) M.A. Columbia University Teachers College (1938)
- Years active: 1928-1971
- Organization: National Urban League
- Parents: Alfred Weems Tanneyhill (father); Adelaide (Grandison) Tanneyhill (mother)

Ann (Anna) Elizabeth Tanneyhill (January 19, 1906 - May 15, 2001) was the National Urban League's director of vocational services from 1947 to 1961. Starting in 1930 and until her retirement in 1971, she was on the headquarters staff of the organization and led the league's efforts to increase job opportunities for Black Americans. She did groundbreaking work in the use of radio and television to promote pride in Black heritage and was a strong supporter of voter registration efforts aimed at minority youth.

== Early life and education ==
Ann Tanneyhill was born in Norwood, Massachusetts on January 19, 1906, to Alfred Weems Tanneyhill and Adelaide (née Grandison) Tanneyhill. She received her B.S. from Simmons College in 1928 and would eventually go on to earn an M.A. in vocational guidance and personnel administration from Columbia University Teachers College in 1938. She was also awarded a certificate from the Radio Workshop of New York University.

== Career ==
After graduating from Simmons, Tanneyhill worked for two years as a secretary and bookkeeper for St. John's Institutional Activities (an organization affiliated with the National Urban League) in Springfield, Massachusetts.In 1930, Tanneyhill was appointed secretary to the National Urban League's director of industrial relations, a position she held for the next ten years. And in 1931 she became director of the league's Vocational Opportunity Campaign, which she continued to lead until 1955. It was during this time, she also earned her M.A. in vocational guidance and personnel administration. During her years with the league, Tanneyhill served in a number of professional posts, including Secretary of the Bureau of Guidance and Placement (1941–45), Executive Assistant (1946), Director of Vocational Services (1947–61), assistant director of Public Relations (1961–63), associate director of Public Relations (1964–68), and Director of Conferences (1969–70). After her retirement in 1971 she continued to serve as a Consultant to the executive director of the League (1971–79) and as Director of the George Edmund Haynes Fellowship Program (1979–81).

During her tenure with the Urban League, Tanneyhill was instrumental in establishing two major initiatives. The first was a series of career conferences between 1950 and 1955 where major companies were invited to recruit on HBCU campuses, which served to provide Black students with more professional opportunities and also to provide employers with records of discriminatory practices a means to improve their standing by hiring more Black talent. The second was the Tomorrow's Scientists and Technicians Project, which was a nation-wide program designed to encourage Black youth to explore career interests in the sciences.

In addition to outreach in print, Tanneyhill did groundbreaking work in radio. She oversaw two radio programs for CBS, "The Negro and National Defense" in 1941, and "Heroines in Bronze" in 1943. She was also involved in television, as the primary consultant for a documentary sponsored by the National Urban League, "A Morning for Jimmy."

Tanneyhill was also active in preserving her community's local history. At Tanneyhill's memorial service, the chairwoman of the Mashpee Historical Commission credited her with researching and gathering much of the data held by the town's archives and for playing in active role in saving South Mashpee School, one of the three buildings in town on the National Register of Historic Places.

== Awards and honors ==
In 1963, Tanneyhill received both the Merit Award of the New York Personnel and Guidance Association and the National Vocational Guidance Association Award. In 1971, she was the first recipient of the National Urban League's annual Ann Tanneyhill Award, named in her honor, "for excellence and extraordinary commitment to the Urban League Movement." That same year she was also honored with an Alumnae Achievement Award from Simmons College.

== Publications ==
National Urban League, Department of Industrial Relations, and Ann Tanneyhill. 1940. Vocational Guidance Bibliography; New York: Dept. of industrial relations, National urban league.

Tanneyhill, Ann. 1938. Guiding Negro Youth toward Jobs. New York: National Ubarn League.

———. 1953. From School to Job: Guidance for Minority Youth. New York: Public Affairs Committee.

———. 1991. Program Aids for the Vocational Opportunity Campaign,. New York, N.Y: Bureau of vocational guidance, Dept. of Industrial relations, National Urban League.

Tanneyhill, Ann, and National Urban League. 1950. How to Organize the Vocational Opportunity and Back-to-School Campaigns.

Tanneyhill, Ann, National Urban League, and Department of Industrial Relations. 1943. Womanpower Is Vital to Victory!: Eleventh Vocational Opportunity Campaign, March 14–21, 1943.

Tanneyhill, Ann, National Urban League, and Industrial Relations Department. 1941. Bibliography on the Negro and National Defense ; Selected References for the Period January 1940 to July 1941. New York: Dept. of Industrial Relations, National Urban League.
