= Ruth Janetta Temple =

American physician

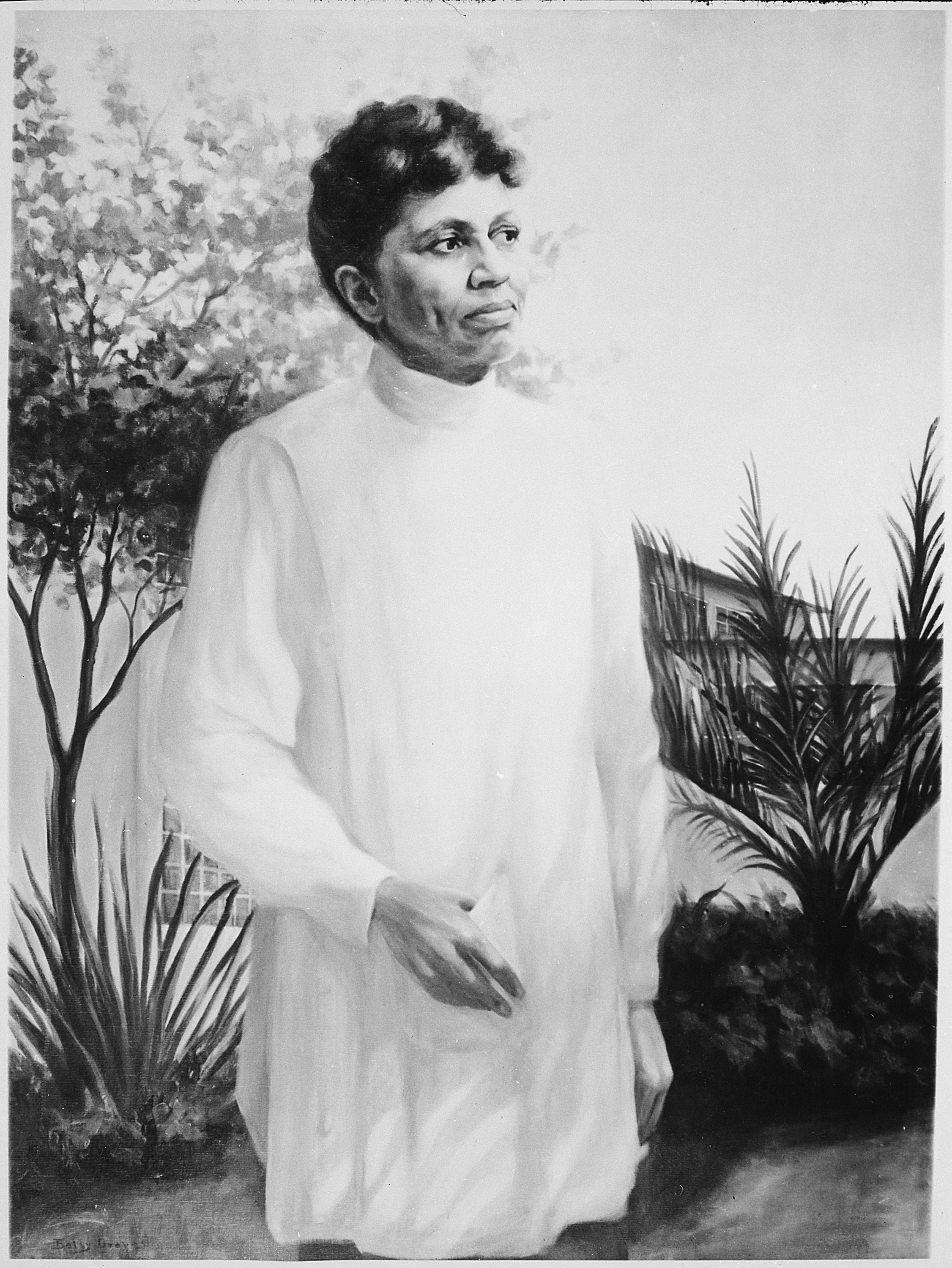
- Portrait of Ruth Janetta Temple by Betsy Graves Reyneau
- Born: 1892; Natchez, Mississippi
- Died: 1984 (aged 91–92)
- Education: Loma Linda University; Yale University
- Occupation: Public Health
- Spouse: Otis Banks

Ruth Janetta Temple (1892–1984) was an American physician who was a leader in providing free and affordable healthcare and education to underserved communities in Los Angeles, California. She and her husband, Otis Banks, established the Temple Health Institute in East Los Angeles, which became a model for community-based health clinics across the country.

== Early life ==
Ruth Janetta Temple was born in Natchez, Mississippi, in 1892 to Amy Morton and Richard Jason Temple. She was her parents' second-born child. Her siblings included Walter, Vivian, Richard, Ethel, and Lanier Temple. Two other siblings died at a young age.

Temple's parents stressed the importance of education and humanism. Her father, a Baptist minister and graduate of Denison University, especially stressed the importance of looking beyond racial barriers and therefore made his home to be a place where people of all backgrounds could congregate. He even shared his personal collection of books written in Greek and Hebrew with Jewish, Catholic and Protestant theologians who needed them for research. Her father felt that, "People will come into our house. All people, all kinds of people, of all race all creeds, all colors, and all educational backgrounds. Our children will learn love before they learn hate." His perspective on race had a strong impact on Temple's life and made it easier for her to work in integrated spaces in her adult life. Temple's mother shared her husband's community spirit. She frequently invited people who were less fortunate into their home for food and clothing.

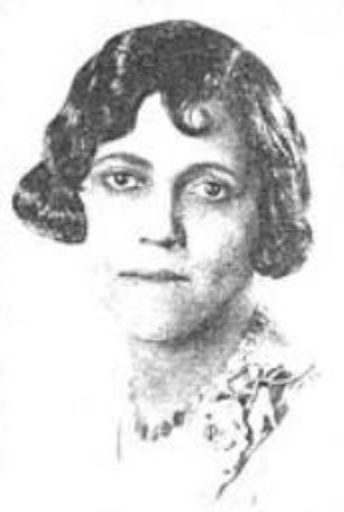
Ruth Janetta Temple, from a 1929 issue of The Crisis

Two years after her father died in 1902, Temple and her family moved to southeast Los Angeles. Originally her mother had homeschooled her children, but she had to go back to work as a nurse to provide for her family. So Ruth had to act as a mother while she was gone. When Temple was 13, her oldest brother Walter, was experimenting with gunpowder outside. He put it into a hose and lit it, causing the gunpowder to blow up in his face. Ruth ran over to her brother who was lying on the ground, grabbed his head and turned it to her. Brushed the soot and powder off his face. She realized he hadn't done much damage, except from a singed eyebrow. After this she saw the possibility of helping others and taking pain away, from then on she wanted to be a physician. In another event Ruth was even more determined to be a physician. One day the Temple's neighbors son, Ernie Fennell, fell into an oil ditch in the area and was carried away for a quarter of a mile. When he was rescued he was covered with oil and wasn't breathing. Ruth knelt down and gave Ernie CPR. After a few moments he began coughing and breathing.

Juliette Estelle Troy, an African American Seventh-day Adventist, converted the Temple family to the denomination. The Troy family and Temple family became the founding members of the Furlong Track Church, the first African American Seventh-day Adventist church in the West, founded in 1908.

== Education ==
Temple enrolled in the College of Medical Evangelists (Loma Linda University) in 1913 and became the first African American woman to graduate from this institution. Temple's family could not afford to fund her college education, but T.W. Troy, a prominent member of the Los Angeles Forum, a black men's civic organization, arranged for the group to pay Temple's tuition. Troy continued to sponsor her education until she graduated with a bachelor's degree in medicine in 1918. She then interned in 1921 at the Los Angeles City Health Department, where she specialized in obstetrics and gynecology. After over twenty years of service in the medical profession, Temple was accepted in the Public Health master's program at Yale University in 1941, and the Los Angeles City Health Department awarded her with a scholarship to support her advanced educational endeavors.

== Career ==
Upon graduation from Loma Linda, Temple began working to create public health services to underserved low-income communities in Los Angeles. She opened the first medical clinic in Southeast Los Angeles, a city of 250,000 people. Funding for the clinic was scarce, so she and her husband Otis Banks turned their newly purchased five-bedroom bungalow into the Temple Health Institute. The institute was a free medical clinic that discussed common community issues such as substance abuse, immunization, nutrition and sex education. Temple found it important to educate adults and children; she wanted people to be self-sufficient, so that nothing would prevent them from getting the resources they need to maintain a healthy life.

She developed, within the institute, community-based programs like the Total Health Program, the Health Study Center, and the Health Study Club. These programs were designed to educate patients and other local residents about the resources available not only in her clinic, but also in the larger community. These services were offered in schools, PTAs, YWCAs, churches, synagogues, service agencies, private medical practices, study clubs, block-to-block trainings, and local health information centers. Her program gained national attention with acronyms like ABC, which stands for "Acquiring basic health knowledge, Bringing into practice what is learned, and Communicating it to contacts". Even after her retirement in 1962 Temple continued to work in the public health service.

Temple was a member of the American Medical Association, the Women's University Club, the California Medical Association, the California Congress of Parents and Teachers, and Alpha Kappa Alpha.

== Legacy ==
Temple died in 1984 at age 91. A year prior to her death, the East Los Angeles Health Center was renamed the Dr. Ruth Temple Center in her honor.
