= Mae Massie Eberhardt =

American unionist activist (1915–2007)

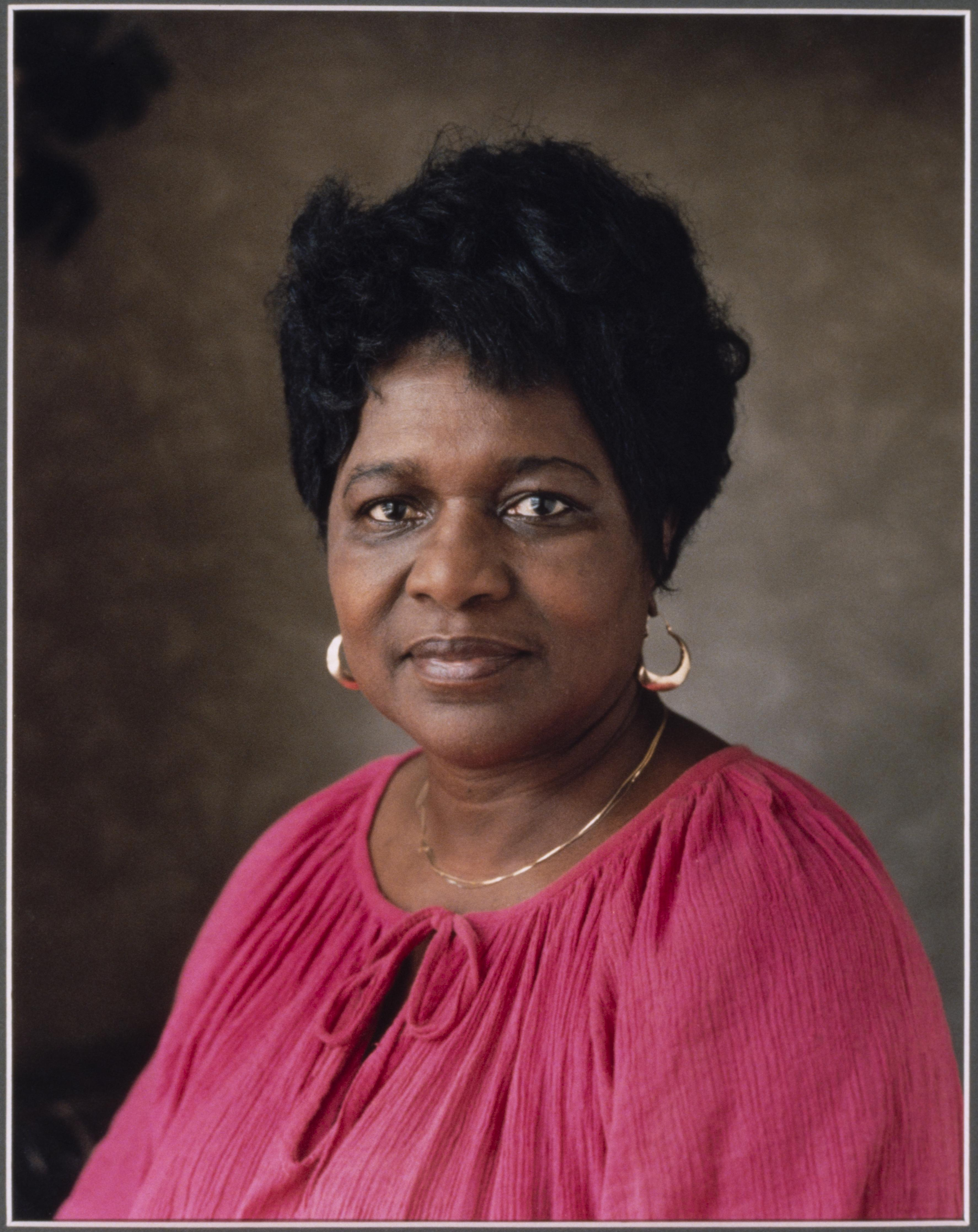
- Born: Mary Eliza Graves; August 31, 1915; Richmond, Virginia, U.S.
- Died: March 11, 2007 (aged 91); Orange, New Jersey, U.S.
- Other names: Mary Massie, Mary Brown
- Occupations: Union Activist; Executive Vice-President of the New Jersey Industrial Union Council

Mary Eliza Eberhardt (née Graves; August 31, 1915 – March 11, 2007) was an American union activist in New Jersey who was active during the twentieth century.

== Biography ==
Mary Eliza Graves was born in Richmond, Virginia on August 31, 1915, to parents Randolph and Ida Kenny Graves. She moved to New Jersey after her first marriage. After the end of her first marriage, she began to work at Orange and Domestic Laundry, which led to her involvement in Local 284, AFL, and union activism. Eberhardt went on to work as on electronics for Kuthe Laboratories in Newark, New Jersey, where she was actively involved with International Union of Electrical, Radio and Machine Workers (IUE). In 1963, she went to work for IUE as civil rights director for District 3, which covers both New Jersey and New York. Eberhardt became the first Black woman ever elected as an officer in a state labor organization when she was elected executive vice-president of the New Jersey Industrial Union Council.

Eberhardt died in Orange, New Jersey on March 11, 2007, at the age of 91.
