= Lucy Miller Mitchell =

- Born: Lucy Miller; January 11, 1899; Daytona Beach, Florida, U.S.
- Died: January 10, 2002 (aged 102); New Rochelle, New York, U.S.
- Known for: Early childhood education

Lucy Miller Mitchell (1899 – 2002) was an early childhood education specialist and community activist from Boston who was instrumental in getting the state to regulate day care centers. She is credited with modernizing the day care system in Massachusetts.

== Early life and education ==
She was born in Daytona Beach, Florida in 1899, the youngest of four children. Howard Thurman, who lived nearby, was a childhood playmate. She attended the Daytona Normal and Industrial Institute and graduated from Talladega College in 1922. That same year, as a teacher at the Daytona School, she witnessed a confrontation between the school's founder, Mary McLeod Bethune, and the Ku Klux Klan.

Soon afterwards she married attorney Joseph S. Mitchell and moved to the Roxbury neighborhood of Boston. While raising her two children, Joseph and Laura, she took courses at the Nursery Training School with nursery school movement pioneer Abigail Adams Eliot. She earned a master's degree in early childhood education from Boston University in 1935.

Her husband was assistant attorney general of Massachusetts from 1945 to 1949; he was also a playwright. Her son, Joseph S. Mitchell, Jr., became the second African American to serve as a superior court judge in Massachusetts when he was appointed by governor John Volpe in 1966.

== Career ==
From 1932 to 1953 she directed the nursery school at Robert Gould Shaw House, a settlement house and community center. Under her direction it became a model school to which student teachers were sent to observe and practice. She was a co-founder of Associated Day Care Services of Metropolitan Boston, and later served as its educational director and acting executive director.

In 1953 she was appointed by the governor of Massachusetts, Christian Herter, to a special commission to study day care licensing. After years of research and activism, a state licensing law was finally passed in 1962 under Governor Volpe. Mitchell then worked with the Massachusetts Department of Education to develop affordable training courses for day care workers. She is considered a pioneer in early childhood education.

After retiring from Associated Day Care Services of Metropolitan Boston, Mitchell trained Peace Corps volunteers to work with children; consulted for the national Head Start Program and helped implement the program in Boston; helped Muriel Snowden establish Freedom House in Roxbury; was president of the Boston Association for the Education of Young Children; and served on the boards of various agencies, including the Boston YWCA and United Community Services of Metropolitan Boston. She died in a nursing home in New Rochelle, New York, the day before her 103rd birthday.

== Honors and awards ==
In 1977 an oral history of Mitchell's life was recorded for the Black Women Oral History Project at the Schlesinger Library of Radcliffe College. She received a Distinguished Citizen Award from the City of Boston in 1979. She was awarded an honorary degree by Wheelock College in 1988. Her home on Waumbeck Street in Roxbury is a stop on the Boston Women's Heritage Trail.

== Publications ==
- Mitchell, Lucy M.; Bill, Audrey A. (November 1962). "Raising Day Care Standards in Massachusetts". The Journal of Nursery Education. 18 (1). National Association for the Education of Young Children (NAEYC): 30–41. JSTOR 42717012.
