= Zelma Watson George =

American philanthropist, opera singer

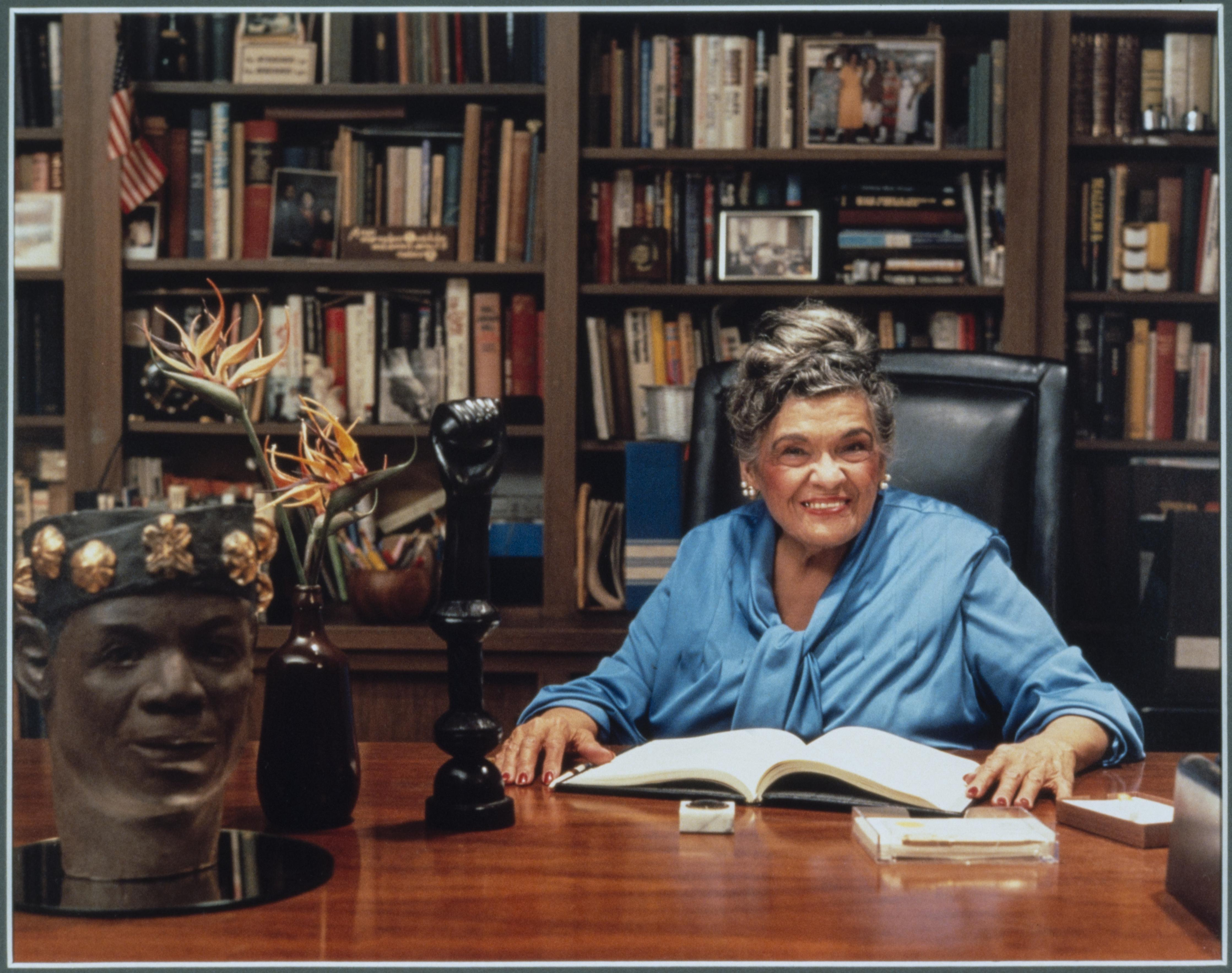
- Zelma Watson George in 1982
- Born: December 8, 1903; Hearne, Texas, U.S.
- Died: July 3, 1994 (aged 90); Shaker Heights, Ohio, U.S.

Zelma Watson George (December 8, 1903 – July 3, 1994) was an African-American philanthropist who was famous for being an alternate in the United Nations General Assembly and as a headliner in Gian Carlo Menotti's opera The Medium in 1949, the first African-American to play a role that was typically played by a white actress.

== Early life ==
Zelma Watson was born to Samuel E.J. and Lena (Thomas) Watson in Hearne, Texas, on December 8, 1903. Her mother was a coordinator of religious activities at Tennessee State College in Nashville, Tennessee. Her father was a Baptist minister, which caused them to move frequently. In 1917 the family moved to Topeka, Kansas, from Dallas, Texas, because the white citizens of Dallas did not approve of Samuel E. J. Watson assisting African-American prisoners. Zelma Watson was born the eldest of six children.

== Education ==
After graduating from Topeka Public Schools, George enrolled at the University of Chicago and obtained a bachelor's degree in sociology in 1924. She then went on to Northwestern University and studied the pipe organ from 1924 until 1926, and in 1925 enrolled as a voice student at the American Conservatory of Music in Chicago until 1927.

In 1943, George received her master's degree in personnel administration from New York University as well as her Ph.D. in sociology in 1954. Her doctoral dissertation, A Guide to Negro Music: Towards a Sociology of Negro Music, which catalogued about 12,000 musical compositions written or enthused by African Americans, due to her extraordinary work, allowed her to receive honorary doctorates from Heidelberg College and Baldwin Wallace College in 1961 as well as Cleveland State University in 1974.

== Personal life ==
Zelma married Baxter Duke in 1937. They were divorced in 1942. In 1944, she married attorney Clayborne George of Ohio who was president of the Cleveland, Ohio, Civil Service Commission. The couple had no children. Zelma was active in the civic affairs of Cleveland as a member of the National Conference of Christians and Jews, the League of Women Voters, Girl Scouts and Alpha Kappa Alpha. She sang in church groups, directed choirs, appeared on lecture programs, and studied singing.

== Musical accomplishments ==
George received a Rockefeller Foundation grant to study African-American music. After completing her study, she wrote the musical drama Chariot's A'Comin!, which was locally aired on television in Cleveland in 1949. She went on to be cast as the first African-American woman to act in a typically white role, in Gian Carlo Menotti's opera The Medium at the Karamu Theater in Cleveland and the Edison Theatre in New York City. Following her debut, George was honored with the Merit Award of the National Association of Negro Musicians. George was later cast in the title role in Menotti's The Consul and Kurt Weill's The Threepenny Opera.

== Political and philanthropy accomplishments ==
In the 1950s George was an advisor to President Dwight D. Eisenhower's administration. She was involved with various national government committees, which usually concerned women, youth, and African Americans. She was a part of the Defense Advisory Committee on Women in the Armed Forces from 1954 until 1957. From 1959 to 1971, George served on the executive council for the American Society of African Culture. She was a long-time member of Alpha Kappa Alpha sorority.

George was an alternate delegate to the United Nations General Assembly from 1960 until 1961. President Richard Nixon named her to be a part of the Corporation for Public Broadcasting in 1971. She received numerous awards for her accomplishments, including the Dag Hammarskjöld Award in 1961, the Dahlberg Peace Award in 1963, and the Mary Bethune Gold Medallion in 1973. George was inducted into the Ohio Women's Hall of Fame in 1983.

== Later life ==
After her husband died, George continued to work in philanthropy and continued to give to and improve the community. From 1966 until 1974 she was the director of the Cleveland Job Corps. Following her retirement, she then went on to teach classes at Cuyahoga Community College in the Elders program. Zelma Watson George died in Shaker Heights, Ohio, on July 3, 1994. Today, there is a community center in Cleveland, Ohio, named in her honor.
