= Elizabeth Cardozo Barker =

American businesswoman and hair stylist

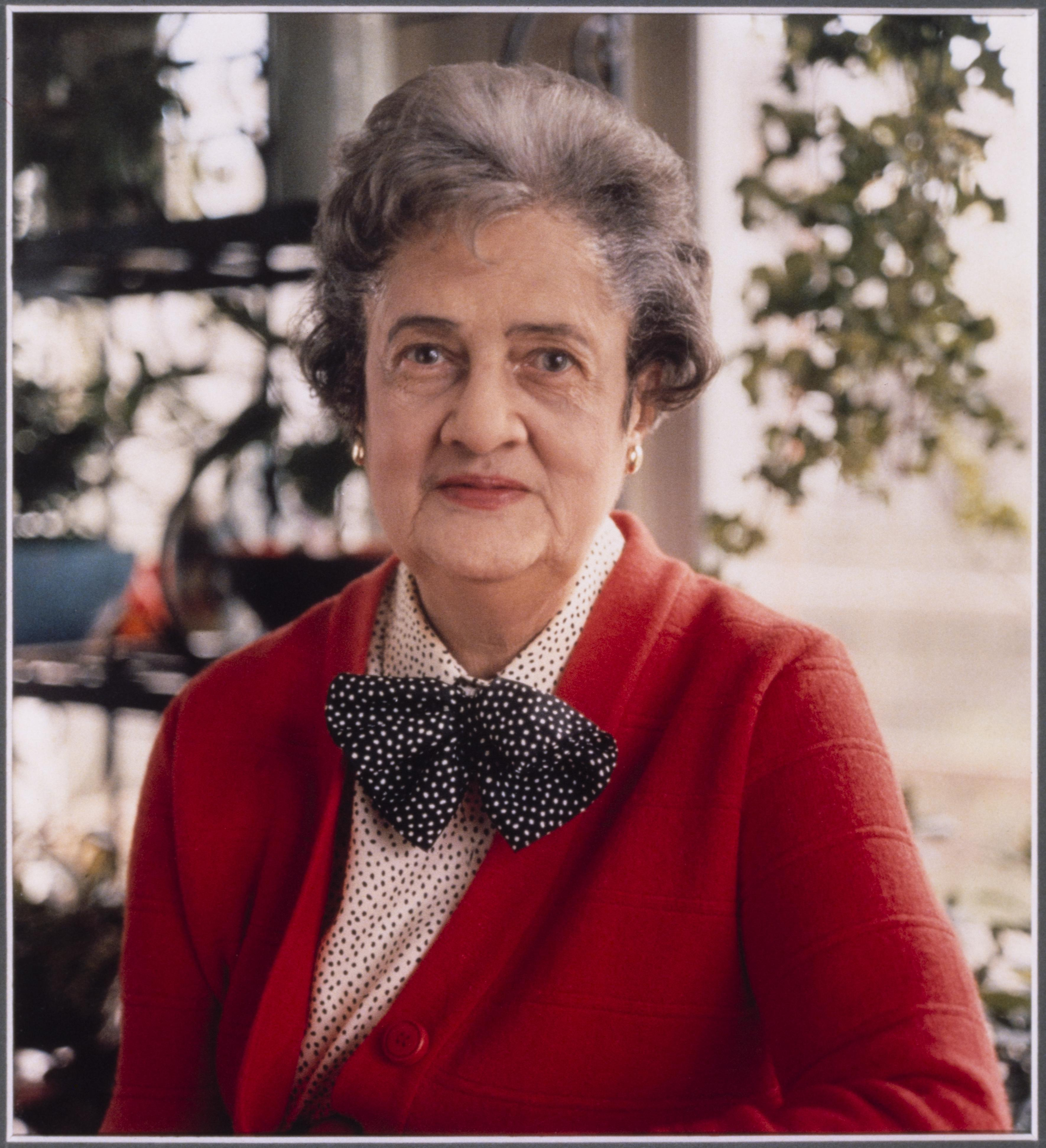
- Born: 1900; Washington, D.C., U.S.
- Died: November 24, 1981 (aged 80); Hyannis, Massachusetts

Elizabeth Cardozo Barker (1900–1981) was the founder of Cardozo Sisters Hairstylists in Washington, D.C. She was also a president of the D.C. Cosmetology Board.

== Biography ==
Elizabeth Cardozo Barker was born in Washington, D.C., where she lived until she retired in 1970. She was interviewed for the Black Women Oral History Project along with both of her sisters, Margaret Cardozo Holmes and Catherine Cardozo Lewis. In 1928, she founded, and the three of them later ran together, Cardozo Sisters Hairstylists. Barker worked as a typist at Howard University and as a manager of the Washington, D.C. branch of Liberty Life Insurance Company of Chicago. Barker originally started the salon in her upstairs apartment but it later grew to have five storefront locations in Washington, D.C. Barker and her sister Margaret Cardozo Holmes would attend white trade shows to learn new techniques and find new products for their business. Jim Crow laws would normally prevent their entrance to these shows but the sisters "passed for white". The sisters sold the business after 50 years in 1978. Elizabeth Cardozo Barker was appointed to the D.C. cosmetology board in 1963 and was made president in 1967. She was also a member of the board of directors for the Small Business Development Center. Through this role and her successful business, she fought for desegregation and the end of discriminatory practices in this field. She retired in Osterville, Massachusetts in 1970. Her second husband, Beltran Barker, died in 1979. She died of a heart attack in 1981 at Cape Cod Community Hospital in Hyannis, Massachusetts.
