= Ardie Clark Halyard =

American banker and civil rights advocate (1896–1989)

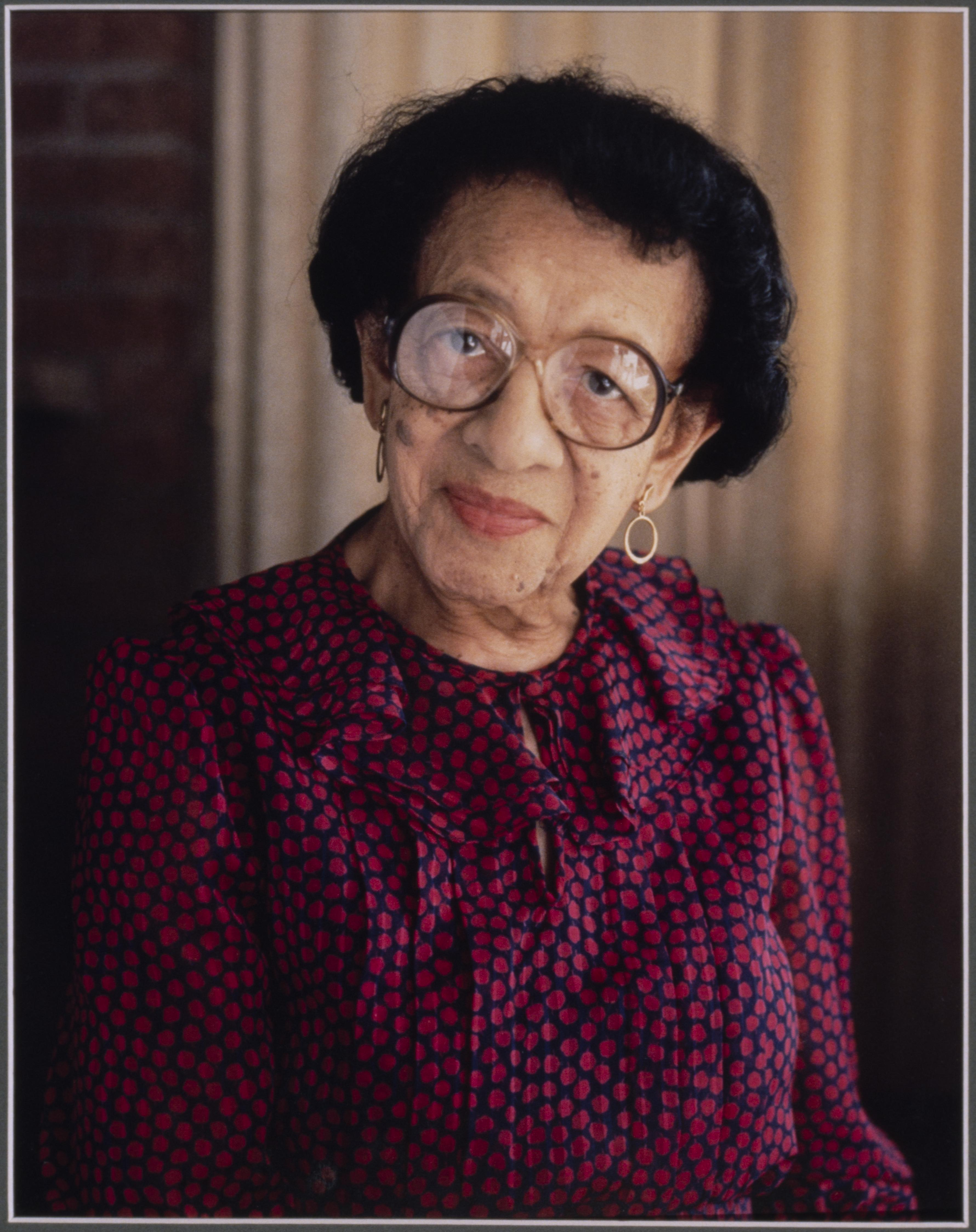
- Halyard in 1982
- Born: 1896; Covington, Georgia, U.S.
- Died: 1989 (aged 92–93)
- Education: Atlanta University
- Occupations: Businesswoman, banker
- Employer(s): Goodwill Industries, Columbia Savings and Loan
- Organization: National Association for the Advancement of Colored People

Ardie A. Clark Halyard (1896–1989) was a banker, activist and first woman president of the Milwaukee chapter of the National Association for the Advancement of Colored People (NAACP).

== Early life ==
Halyard was born in Covington, Georgia. She was the daughter of a sharecropper. Halyard graduated with a degree in education from Atlanta University. She married Wilbur Halyard in 1920. She and her husband lived in Beloit for some time, where they started an NAACP branch there. In 1923, she and her husband moved to Milwaukee, Wisconsin. At the time when they had moved to Milwaukee, they discovered white realtors "openly discussed strategies to restrict the city's black population" to certain areas of town.

== Career ==
In 1925, she and her husband co-founded the first black-owned savings and loan in Milwaukee, Columbia Savings and Loan Association. The couple opened the savings and loan with a single ten-dollar bill. This bank allowed black people to apply for loans without facing racial discrimination. It was "virtually impossible for blacks to obtain a mortgage so they could purchase a home" at the time. To make the savings and loan a success, neither she nor Wilbur Halyard "drew a salary" for the first 10 years. Halyard worked as a director at Goodwill Industries for 20 years, while at the same time acting as "bookkeeper and secretary for Columbia." By the late 1960s, their Columbia's assets were valued at $4 million.

Halyard became the first woman president of the Milwaukee chapter of the NAACP in 1951. During her time as president, she "increased dues-paying membership from 39 to 1,416 people." She remained active in the NAACP in other capacities, often as treasurer. She was also a member of the Wisconsin Governor's Commission on the Status of Women.

== Legacy ==
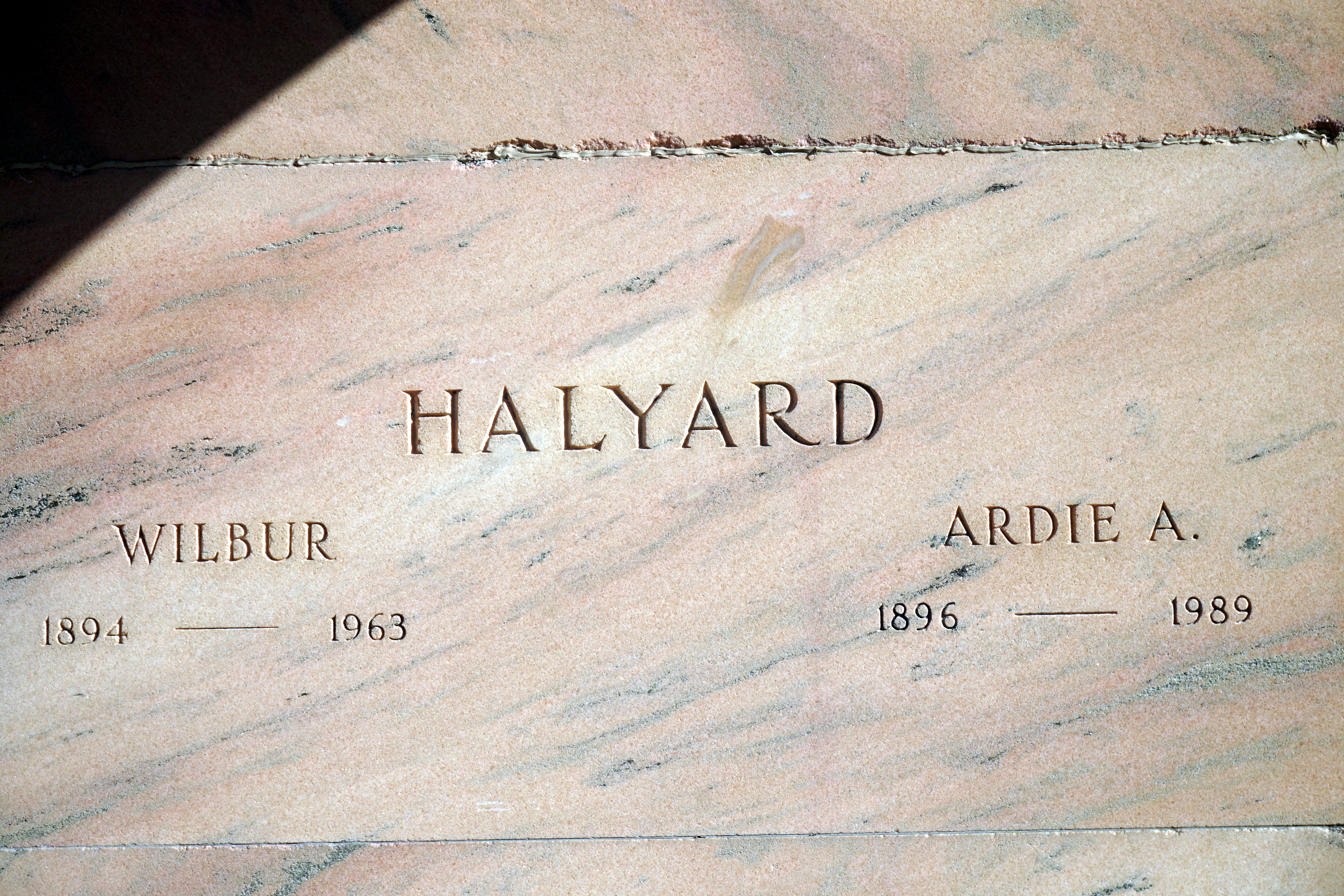
Ardie and Wilbur Halyard graves at Forest Home Cemetery

In 1983 she was awarded the Public Service Recognition Award from the United Negro College Fund.

As part of her legacy, there is a park, city street and neighborhood, Halyard Park, named after her and her husband in Milwaukee.
