= Esther Mae Scott =

Mississippi blues singer (1893–1979)

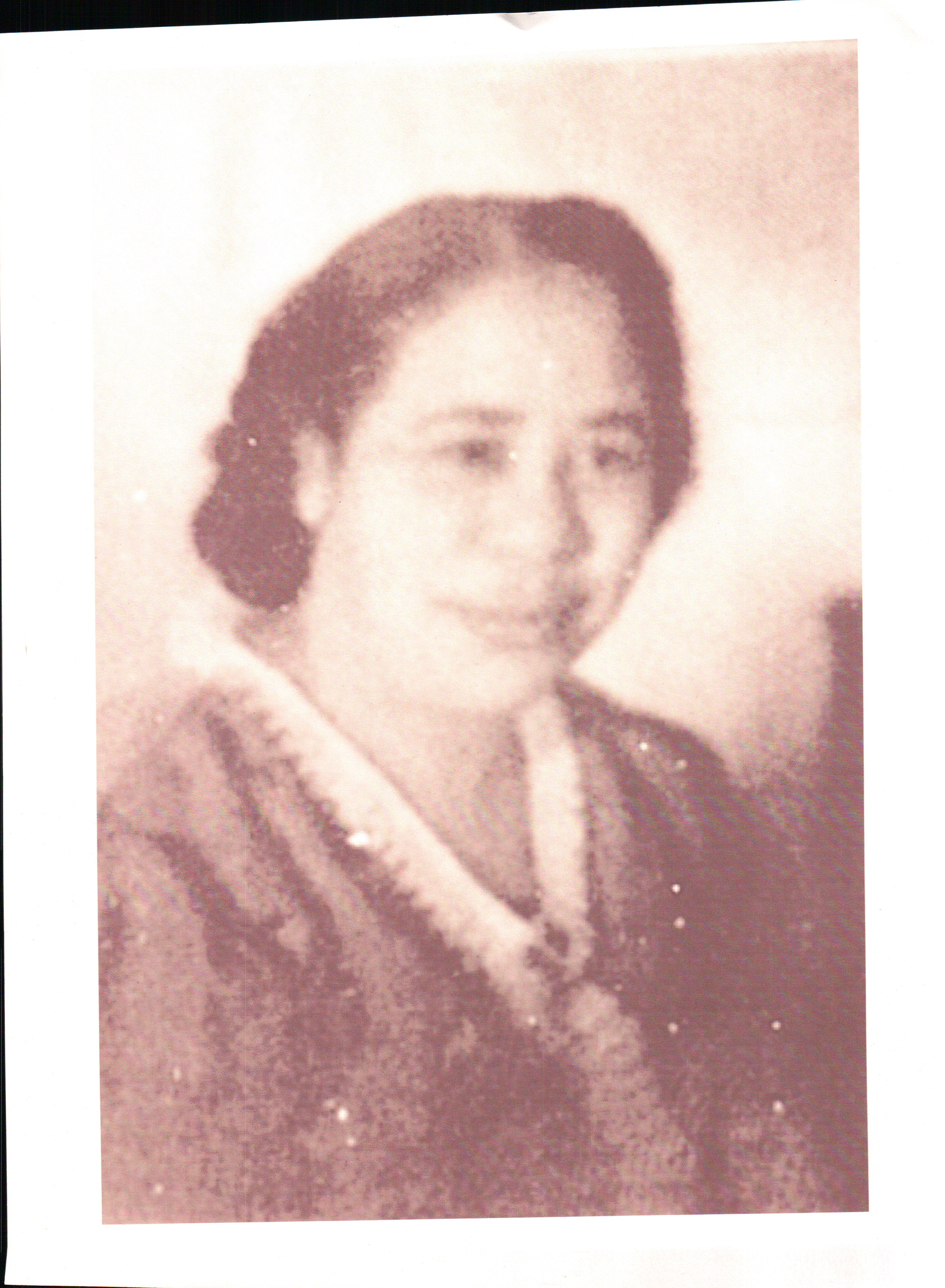
- Born: March 25, 1893
- Died: October 8, 1979

Esther Mae Prentiss Scott (March 25, 1893 – October 16, 1979) was a Mississippi blues singer, also known as Mother Scott. After touring during the heyday of the blues, she stopped performing for about four decades before reviving her musical career in the Washington, D.C., area and releasing her only album, Mama Ain't Nobody's Fool (1971).

*The photo above has her death on October 8: that is incorrect. She died on October 16, 1979.

== Early life and career ==
Scott was born on March 25, 1893, on Polk Plantation in Bovina, Mississippi. She was the seventh of fourteen children of poor black sharecroppers Henry S. Erves, her step father and Mary Eliza Prentiss Erves her mother. Their family worked on the plantation where their ancestors Monroe Prentiss and Agnes Jane Garrett Prentiss, Mary Eliza's parents, had been enslaved. Scott's biological father was Sam Brown, from a prominent Jewish family in Vicksburg. She began farm work at age five, and food and clothing were so scarce she often suffered frostbite. Schooling at the Clover Valley Baptist School, a Rosenwald School, was limited to a few winter weeks where farm work could not be done.

Music, however, was an abundant part of life there, and she quickly learned to play guitar, mandolin, banjo, and piano, though never learned to read music. She said in 1979:

The average Negro from Mississippi and other slave counties knew how to sing because singing is something to raise your ego up enough to help you solve the task you got to do. And singing looked like it'd make the day shorter for you.

Around age 14, she ran away from home and lied about her age to join the travelling show W.S. Wolcott's Rabbit Foot Minstrels, which at various points in its long history featured numerous blues musicians, including Ma Rainey and Bessie Smith. Scott's stage name was Big Baby, and was paid a dollar a day to sing, play guitar, dance, and sell a hair care product called Jack Rabbit and Bentone Liniment, a hair pomade that was falsely claimed to grow and straighten hair, but was actually red devil lye that made hair fall out. She left after two years, tired of "bathing out of a pickle barrel."

For 27 years, she worked for the Klaus family, a family of German-Jewish caterers in Vicksburg, Mississippi, as a housekeeper and nanny. The family was related to her father Sam Brown. Her father acknowledged her, and her sister Clara and brother William. Sam Brown maintained two families, one white and one black; though it was illegal to associate and intermingle between races, it was very common. Scott was put to work as a domestic into her paternal extended family.

The family allowed her occasional time off to travel to see or perform with Lead Belly, Bessie Smith, Louis Armstrong, and other musicians. In 1938, the family downsized due to the Great Depression and unceremoniously fired Scott without severance, offering her nothing but a ticket back to her former childhood home in Mississippi on the Walter Langston Polk plantation, which was eventually purchased by her grandfather Monroe Prentiss and his son Jeff Prentiss.

Instead, Scott moved to Baltimore, Maryland, where she worked as a housekeeper and nanny for a cousin of the Klaus family, Merty Landau Shoemaker, for twenty years.

== Return to the stage ==
In 1958, Scott moved to Washington, D.C., and began her life-long association with the St. Stephen and the Incarnation Episcopal Church in Mount Pleasant. She began performing at St. Stephen, then at funerals and weddings, then at nightclubs like the Cellar Door, Childe Harold, Cool Font, Smithsonian Folk Life and other festivals, many schools and colleges and Universities including Douglass College, Rutgers University and many radio and television interviews and performances.

At the age of 78, Scott released her only album in 1971 on Bomp Records Adelphi Records. The album Mama Ain't Nobody's Fool includes her own compositions like "God Called Adam" and covers including Bessie Smith's "Gulf Coast Blues", the Beatles' "Can't Buy Me Love", and Fats Domino's "I'm Walkin'". On the album she is accompanied by Vassar Clements and Emmylou Harris. A review in Folklore Forum stated "If Bessie Smith, Ma Rainey or some of the other so-called 'classic' blues singers of the twenties were still actively recording today [...] their LPs would not be very different from the one featuring Esther Mae Scott."

For her 80th birthday, Scott wrote the song "Keep-A' Goin'", a musical setting of the poem by Frank Lebby Stanton. She sued the makers of the film Nashville (1975) for using the song without permission.

Scott performed at a number of large events, including several bicentennial celebrations, the 1976 and 1978 Smithsonian Folklife Festivals, the General Convention of the Episcopal Church, and at Washington National Cathedral.

She was also invited to the White House to play for President Jimmy Carter's mother's birthday party.

== Death ==
Scott suffered a stroke and died at Washington Hospital Center on October 8, 1979.
