= Inabel Burns Lindsay =

American social worker

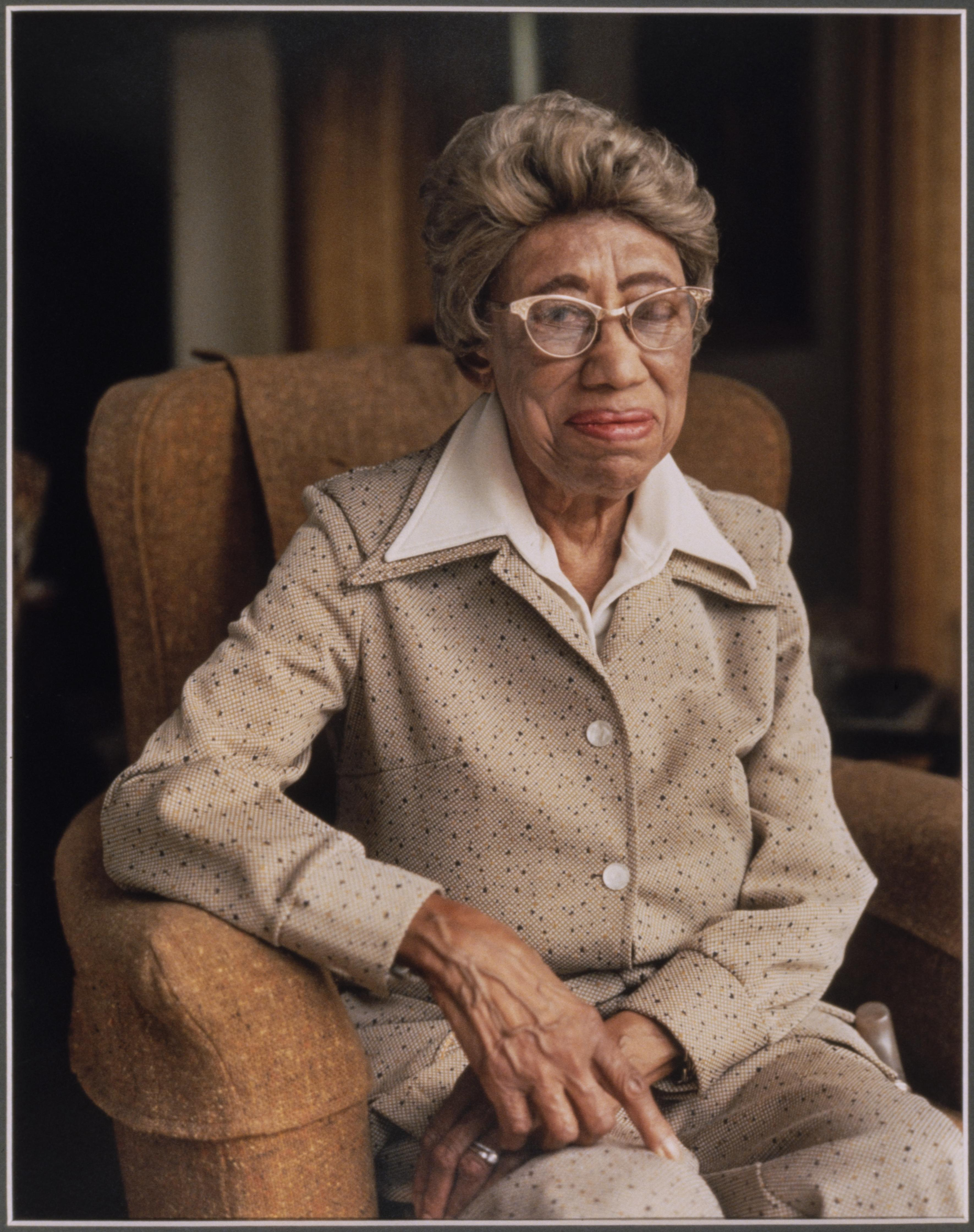
Portrait of Inabel Burns Lindsay

Inabel Burns Lindsay (February 13, 1900, St. Joseph, Missouri – 1983) was an American social worker and the founding dean of Howard University School of Social Work.

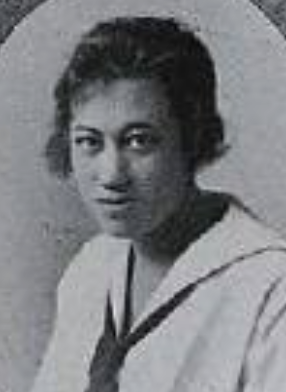
Inabel Burns Lindsay, from the 1920 yearbook of Howard University

== Biography ==
Inabel Burns Lindsay was the youngest of six children. She suffered from blindness at a young age, so two of her siblings, both teachers, instructed her. Encouraged by her mother and older brother to go to college, Lindsay enrolled at Howard University in 1916, and became actively involved with the campus activities, and joined Alpha Kappa Alpha. Soon after, she became the founder of the Howard Chapter of the Women's Suffrage League.

After getting her bachelor's degree and graduating with honors in 1920, she entered the New York School of Social Work. Afterward, Lindsay returned to Missouri due to her mother's failing health. After returning home, she worked in a public welfare office until enrolling at the Crown Family School. After completing her degree in 1937, E. Franklin Frazier invited Lindsay to join the faculty at Howard and assist in the development of a new social work project.

== Career ==
Before joining the faculty at Howard University in 1937, Lindsay taught at Kansas City public schools where she developed various methods to teaching at-risk children. She also carried out research for the National Urban League in cities experiencing many types of racial unrest as well as developing recommendations for addressing their needs.

She married Arnett Lindsay, a real estate broker. The two settle down in St. Louis where Arnett was in business. Although Lindsay was free from teaching she didn't immediately go back to work. Lindsay promised her husband that she would stay home for a year and try to conceive a child. After eleven months of Inabel's stay at home, she would slowly and eventually return to work. The Urban League would contact Inabel and ask if she would join Charles S. Johnson in conducting fieldwork in Springfield, Illinois - which she would. Soon after, she returns to Washington to continue her career.

E. Franklin Frazier, a sociologist and social worker, was influential in adding Lindsay to the faculty at Howard University. Lindsay worked at the university for 30 years before retiring in 1967. In 1944, the Howard University trustees approved the establishment of an autonomous school of social work. The next year she became Dean for the School of Social Work, and held that position until 1967. As Dean, she continued her efforts to expand the existing programs and introduce new ones such as a course studying racial and cultural factors in social work. She was known for both her local and nationwide public service. After retiring in 1967. Lindsay was a social welfare consultant to the Department of Health, Education and Welfare. She stayed as a social welfare consultant for two and a half years. She died in 1983 from complications of diabetes.

== Accomplishments ==
Lindsay was the only female academic dean at any Washington DC area during the thirty-year period she worked at Howard. In 1966, she was a delegate for the 1966 White House Conference of Civil Rights, and she was on the District of Columbia Public Welfare Advisory Board in 1966. In 1974, the Metropolitan Washington chapter of the National Association of social workers named Lindsay the "Social Worker of the Year". Later in 1982, Lindsay was to be awarded the Doctor of Humane Letters.

In 1985, Howard's Board of Trustees named the building that houses the School of Social Work after her, the Dr. Inabel Burns Lindsay Hall.
