= Ozeline Wise =

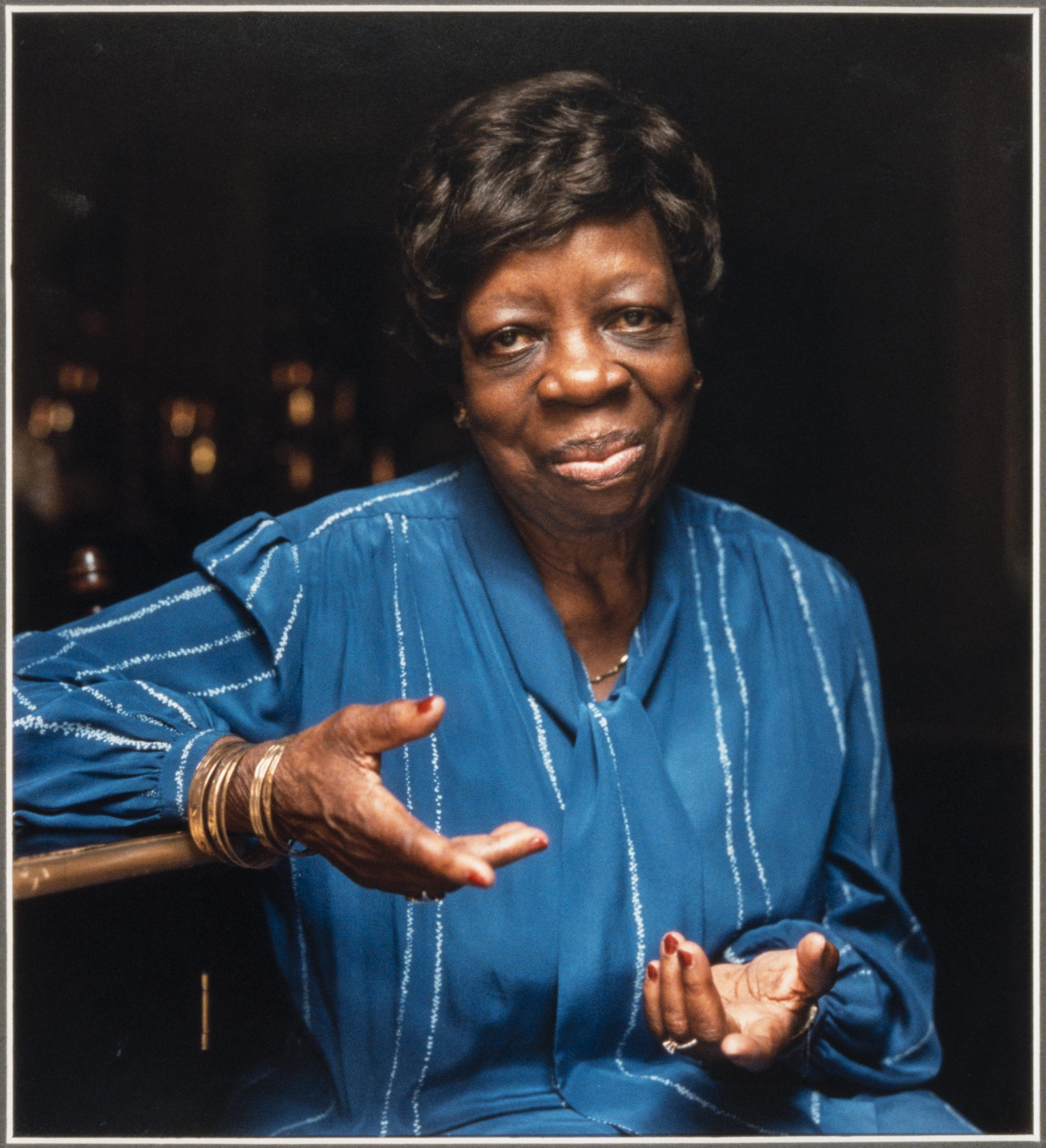
- Wise in 1978
- Born: 1903; Worcester, Massachusetts, U.S.
- Died: 1988 (aged 84–85); Cambridge, Massachusetts, U.S.

Ozeline Pearson Wise (1903 – 1988) was the first African-American woman to be employed in the banking department of the Commonwealth of Massachusetts, a position she held for 20 years. She and her sister Satyra Bennett co-founded the Citizens Charitable Health Association and the Cambridge Community Center.

Wise took the civil service exam but was denied a job with the post office because of her gender. She later took a job at the banking department of the Commonwealth of Massachusetts in the early 1950s.

== Personal life ==
Ozeline was born in Worcester, Massachusetts. Her parents were Frances Lavina Gale (1868–1948) and William B. Pearson (1868–1919) both born in Jamaica. Her grandfather Josiah Pearson had been an enslaved person in Jamaica. According to the Cambridge City Directories, in the early 1900s, Reverend William B. Pearson and his family moved to serve as the pastor of the St. Paul's African Methodist Episcopal Church She graduated from high school in Cambridge, Mass. She married John Wise in 1931 and they adopted a son, Hubert Barrett Wise, in the 1940s. According to the Greater Lowell City Directories about 1942, Ozeline and John Wise opened an inn, Galehurst Guest House, 239 Concord Road, Billerica which was owned and operated for nearly 30 years. In the Greater Lowell area, the Galehurst Guest House was the only tourist facility recommended for African American travelers in the Negro Motorist Green Book. Wise died in 1988 and left her papers, as well as those of her sister and her father, to the Schlesinger Library.
