= Charleszetta Waddles =

Detroit activist and minister

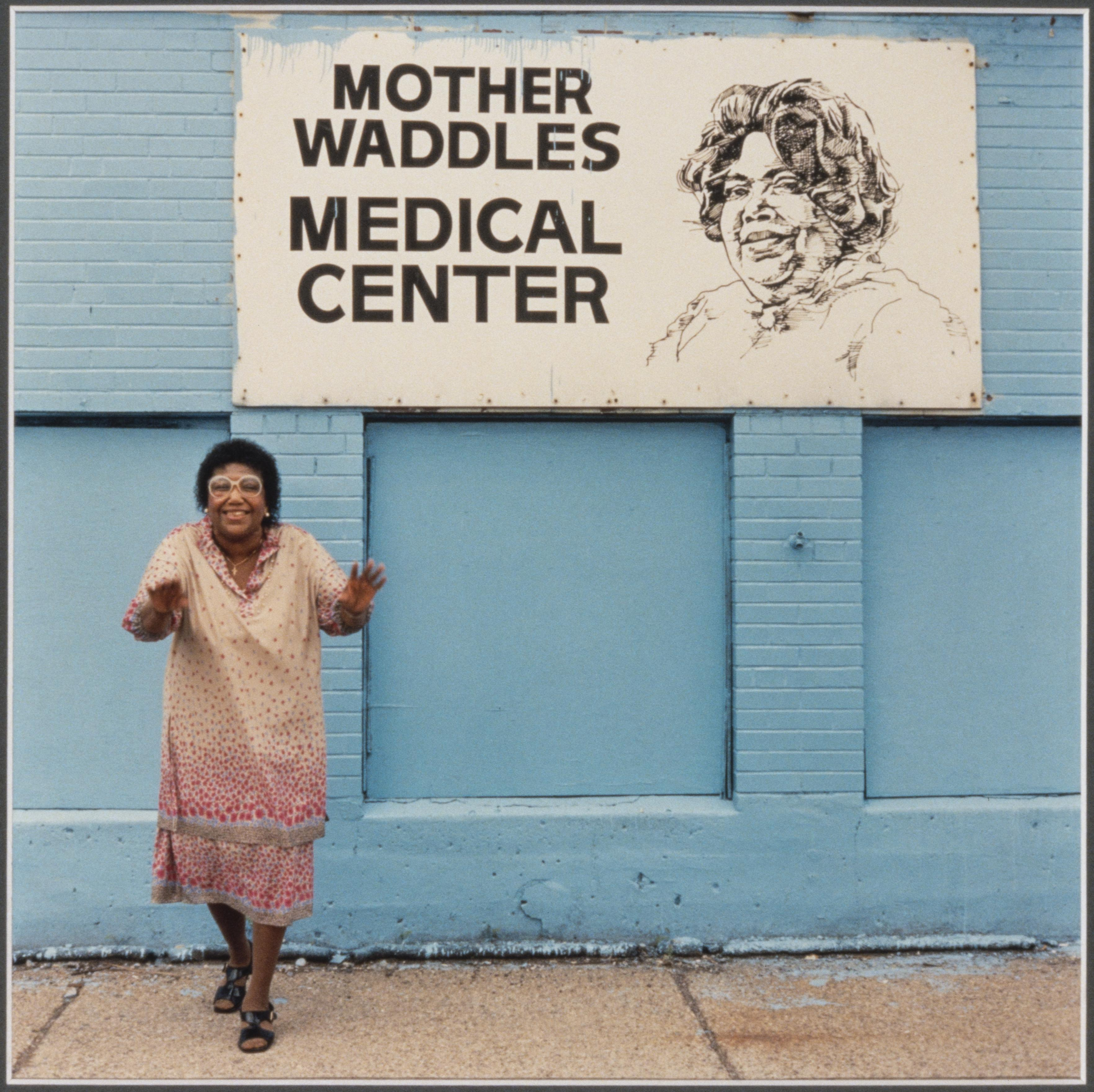
- Born: Charleszetta Lena Campbell; October 7, 1912; St. Louis, Missouri, United States
- Died: July 12, 2001 (aged 88); Detroit, Michigan, United States
- Occupation: Minister
- Employer: Mother Waddles Perpetual Mission
- Title: Founder
- Spouses: LeRoy Wash (m. 1933; div. 1945) Payton Waddles (m. 1950)
- Children: 7

Charleszetta Waddles (born Charleszetta Lena Campbell; October 7, 1912 – July 12, 2001), also known as Mother Waddles, was an African-American activist, Pentecostal church minister, and founder of Mother Waddles Perpetual Mission, an independent church in Detroit that provides support, such as food, clothing and other basic services to Detroit's poor. She is listed in the Michigan Women's Hall of Fame for her contributions to Social Work and Mission Work in the Detroit area.

== Early life and education ==
Charleszetta Lena Campbell was born on October 7, 1912, in St. Louis, Missouri to Henry Campbell and Ella Brown. She was the eldest of seven children, only three of whom survived to adulthood. Her father Henry was a successful St. Louis barber who became financially ruined after he unknowingly gave a haircut to a customer with impetigo, a contagious skin disease, which subsequently caused the infection to spread to other clients who were members of his church congregation. Her father died when she was 12, and, despite being a successful student, she left school in eighth grade to get work as a housemaid and provide for her family.

The following year, Waddles found work as a sorter in a rag factory and later that year became pregnant by her 23-year-old boyfriend, who ended up leaving her. In 1933, at age 21, she married LeRoy Wash, a 37-year-old truck driver, and the couple had six children together. The family moved together to Detroit in 1936. Waddles divorced Wash in 1945. She then lived in a common-law marriage with Roosevelt Sturkey and had three more children. In 1950 she married Payton Waddles, an employee of Ford Motor Company.

== Ministry and help to poor ==
Portrait by Nicole Macdonald

For over four decades, the Reverend Charleszetta Waddles, affectionately known as "Mother Waddles," devoted her life to providing food, hope, and human dignity to the downtrodden and disadvantaged people of Detroit. Founder, director, and spiritual leader of the Mother Waddles Perpetual Mission, Inc., a nonprofit, nondenominational organization run by volunteers and dependent on private donations, Waddles believed that the church must move beyond religious dogma to focus on the real needs of real people.

Following a period of diligent bible study, Charleszetta Waddles became an ordained as a minister in the First Pentecostal Church. She was later re-ordained, in the International Association of Universal Truth. In 1950, her religious teachings gave shape and inspiration to the founding of the Helping Hand Restaurant. In Detroit's skid row surrounded by flophouses she offered meals for as little as 35 cents. Unlike the “soup kitchens” of the Depression era, where the destitute lined up with a tin cup for a handout, Mother Waddles’ establishment boasted of white tablecloths, a flower on every table and uniformed waitresses. Those who could not pay could eat for free, while those who could afford to often paid as much as three dollars for a cup of coffee. At first Mother Waddles did all the cooking, dishwashing and laundry herself, but as time went by, dozens of dedicated volunteers joined her. The restaurant remained open until 1984 when a fire forced its closure.

In 1956 Waddles convinced an inner-city landlord to let her use a vacant storefront at no cost. It was at this property, located in a crime-ridden area of Detroit that she established Mother Waddles Perpetual Mission for Saving Souls of All Nations. Its name was later shortened to: Mother Waddles Perpetual Mission. Fires, financial setbacks and other problems forced the mission to move several times over the years, but its spirit and goals remained the same. Thousands of needy people walked through the doors of the mission. At times over 200 volunteers were available to help provide for and assist the needy.

In addition to helping people, Mother Waddles, started innovative programs for the disadvantaged. Classes in typing, dressmaking, machine operation, upholstery and cooking were among those taught at the centers. A free medical clinic, job counseling and placement were available through the mission. "We're trying to show what the church could mean to the world if it lived by what it preached," Mother Waddles told Newsweek. "I read the Bible. It didn't say just go to church. It said, 'Do something.'" In addition to operating a 35-cent dining room on Detroit's "skid row" that serves appetizing meals in cheerful, dignified surroundings, the mission offers health care, counseling, and job training to thousands of needy citizens. Still others benefit from an Emergency Services Program that provides food, clothing, shelter, and medicine. Well into her eighties, Waddles continued to work 12-hour days and to remain on call throughout the night. "We give a person the things he needs, when he needs them," she told Lee Edson of Reader's Digest. "We take care of him whether he's an alcoholic or a junkie, black or white, employed or unemployed. We don't turn anyone away."
