= Kathleen Redding Adams =

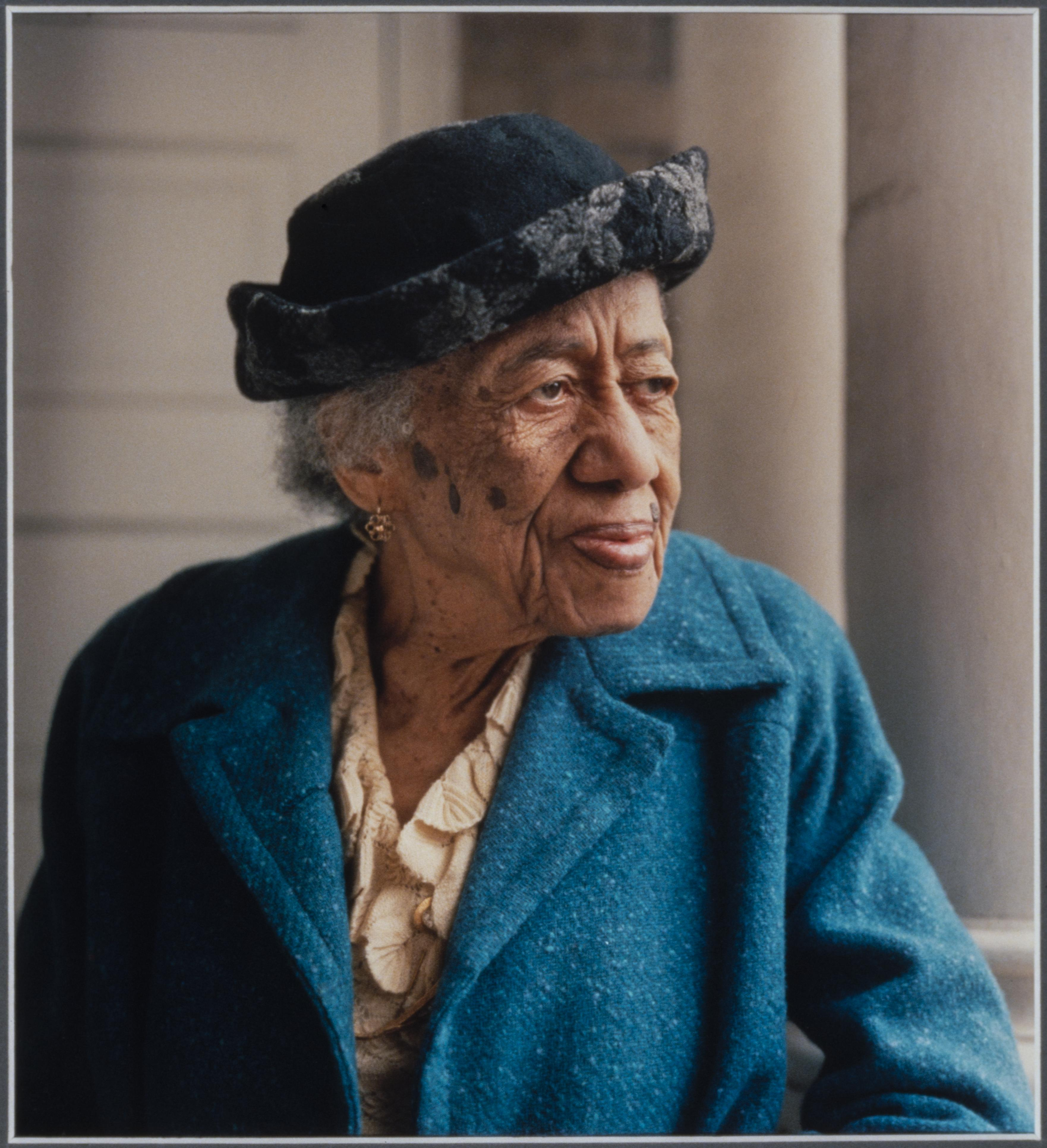

Kathleen Redding Adams (July 11, 1890 – June 15, 1993) was a teacher both in Atlanta Public Schools and at the Carrie Steele Pitts Home, which was a home for orphans, as well as a prominent member of the First Congregational Church in Atlanta.

== Biography ==
Kathleen Redding was born on July 11, 1890, to Wesley Chapel Redding and his wife, Ellen, the eldest of four children. The Reddings were a prominent Black family in Atlanta. As a child, she lived on Auburn Avenue in Atlanta, a prosperous black neighborhood, and attended public school.

Kathleen Redding went on to attend Atlanta University in 1906, where she studied under W.E.B. DuBois and George A. Towns. She graduated from Atlanta University in 1911. After her graduation, Kathleen Redding taught at the Roach Street School in Atlanta for twelve years, and then left her public school teaching career to marry William D. Adams, a railway postal clerk. They divorced in 1935. She returned to her work as a public school teacher, this time in the Fulton County School District, for 17 more years. During this time she taught at the Carrie Steele Pitts Home for the care of orphans. She retired in 1957.

Adams preserved the history of her family through documents and memorabilia. She sometimes loaned these materials to the City of Atlanta for display, and made tapes about the history of the public schools in Atlanta. As a hobby, Adams wrote "verses" to describe people and events, some of which were published in the Atlanta Daily World.

As of 1977, she was the oldest active member of the First Congregational Church in Atlanta and acted as the church historian during the time that Henry H. Proctor was minister of the church.

== Death ==
Kathleen Redding Adams died on June 15, 1993, aged 102.
