= Florence Edmonds =

American nurse, teacher and healthcare administrator (1890–1983)

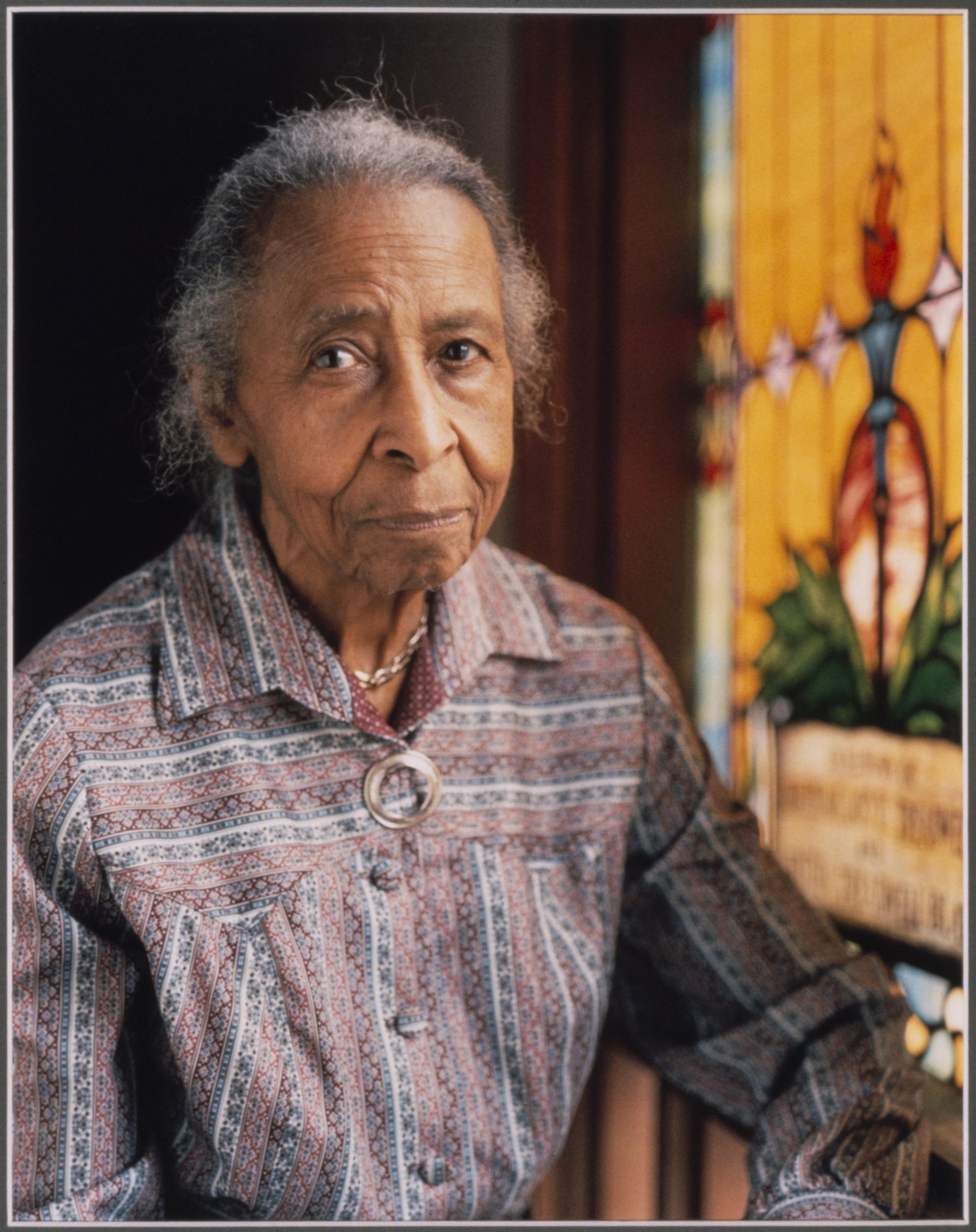
- Portrait of Florence Edmonds
- Born: Florence Jacobs; March 27, 1890; Pittsfield, Massachusetts
- Died: 1983 (Age 94)
- Occupations: Nurse; Teacher; Healthcare Administrator

Florence Edmonds (March 27, 1890 – 1983) was an American nurse, teacher, and healthcare administrator from Massachusetts.

== Biography ==
Edmonds was born, raised, and went school in Pittsfield, Massachusetts. Her grandfather was Rev. Samuel Harrison, the founder and first leader of Second Congregational Church. In 1908, she was the valedictorian for the class of 1908 at Pittsfield High School.

During World War I, she was refused training as a nurse by a local Pittsfield hospital, House of Mercy. In 1917, she was able to enroll in a three-year nursing course at Lincoln Hospital and Home Training School for Nurses in New York City. After completing this course, Edmonds received a scholarship to study hospital social service from Columbia University.

After graduating, Edmonds worked at Henry Street Settlement, a visiting nurses service.

In 1922, Edmonds married William Bailey Edmonds and in 1926, they relocated to her hometown, Pittsfield. They had four children. After moving from New York City to Pittsfield, Edmonds did not try to find work because Pittsfield wasn't "ready for a black [registered] nurse." During this time, she began to sew from home to help earn money for her family.

In the 1940s, Edmonds sought work as a nurse and, during World War II, she taught home nursing classes for the American Red Cross. In 1945, she joined the Pittsfield Visiting Nurse Association. She acted as secretary for District One of the Massachusetts State Nurses Association. From 1956 to 1968, Edmonds served as a health coordinator and part-time instructor in home nursing at Pittsfield General Hospital.

In 1962, Edmonds was named "Mother of the Year" by the Women's Club in Pittsfield.
