= W. E. B. Du Bois Research Institute =

Academic institute in Harvard University

The W. E. B. Du Bois Research Institute, formerly the W. E. B. Du Bois Institute for African and African-American Research, is part of the Hutchins Center for African and African American Research located at Harvard University. Its main work is in the provision of fellowships to scholars studying a wide variety of topics relating to its central concerns, which are African and African American studies.

== History ==
The W. E. B. Du Bois Institute for African and African-American Research was established in 1975. It is named after W. E. B. Du Bois, who was the first African American to receive a Ph.D. from Harvard University (1895).

The center was the basis for the foundation of the Hutchins Center for African & African American Research, and became one of several institutes under the umbrella of this center.

== Functions ==
The Institute awards up to twenty fellowships annually to scholars at various stages in their careers in the fields of African and African American studies to facilitate the writing of doctoral dissertations. The appointed fellows conduct individual research for a semester or two in fields broadly related to African and African American Studies. It has as of 2020 supported more than 300 Fellows.

The institute co-hosts the W. E. B. Du Bois Society, an academic and cultural enrichment program for African American secondary school students, along with Ella J. Baker House in Dorchester, Boston. The society was founded by Jacqueline and Rev. Eugene C. Rivers, and its director as of 2020 is Jacqueline O. Cooke Rivers.

Henry Louis Gates Jr. is the director of the institute.

In 2013 the institute alongside the Hip-Hop Archive and Research Institute established the Nasir Jones Hip-Hop Fellowship as a scholarship for the arts.
