= Newman Taylor Baker =

American jazz drummer & washboard player (born 1943)

- Born: February 4, 1943 (age 82); Petersburg, Virginia, United States
- Genres: African American music, Jazz, Black string band, Free improvisation, Blue grass
- Occupations: Washboardist, Drummer, Teaching artist, Vocalist, Composer
- Instruments: Washboard, Drum set, Percussion, Voice
- Years active: 1960s–present

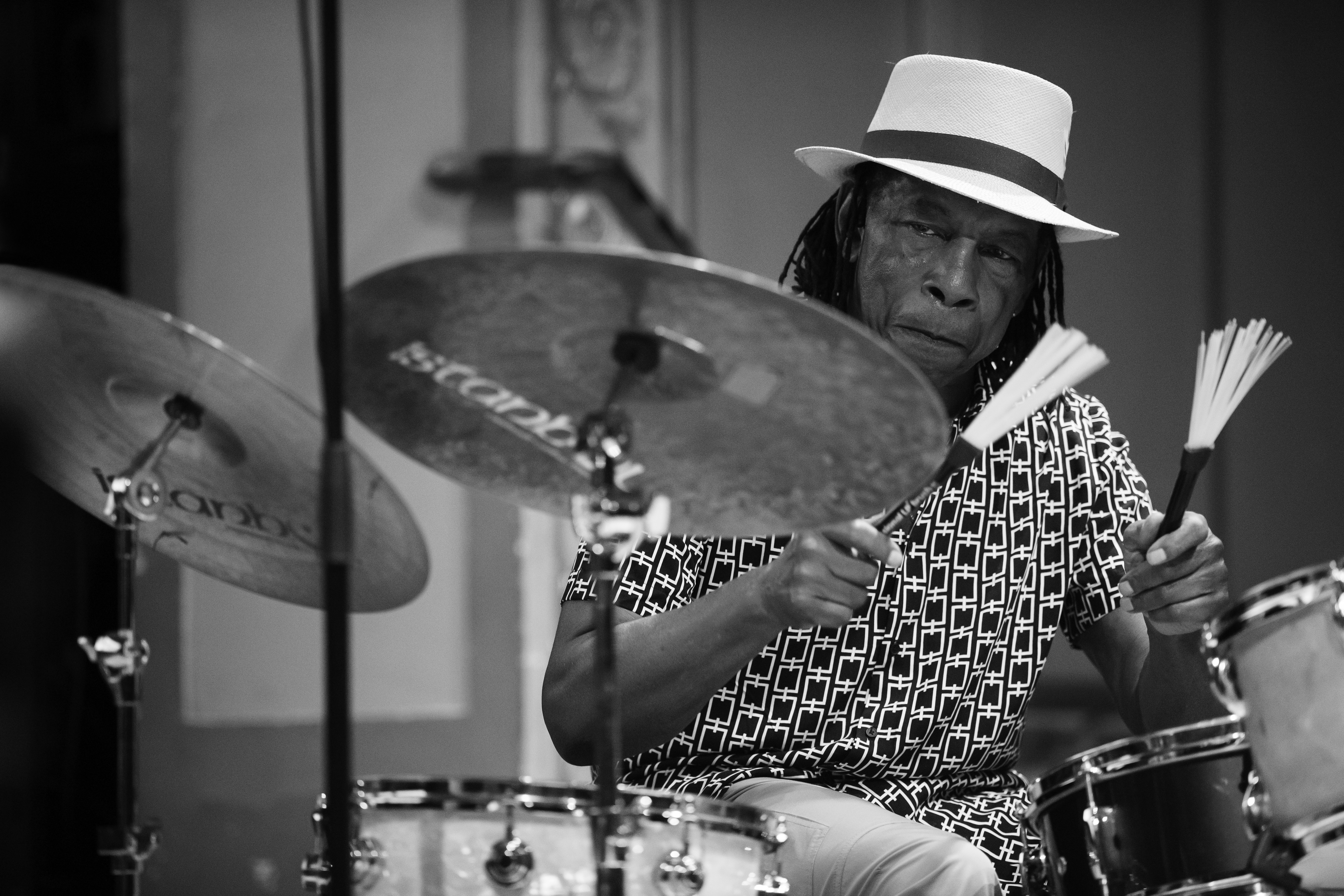
Newman Taylor Baker, Arts for Art - Vision Festival 2024. Photo by Marek Lazarski

Newman Taylor Baker (born February 4, 1943) is a jazz drummer and a washboard player.

== Early life ==
Newman Taylor Baker's paternal grandfather, Thomas Nelson Baker Sr., was the only former slave to receive a PhD from Yale University (1906). His father and siblings graduated from Oberlin College and Conservatory. Edith Baker (voice and piano), Ruth B. Baker (voice and piano), and Harry B. Baker (piano and organ), his aunts and uncle, were graduates of Oberlin Conservatory of Music. His maternal grandfather, Reverend Newman D. Taylor, known as the "Roland Hayes" of Mississippi, gave vocal recitals throughout the state and his uncle, Newman C. Taylor, accompanied him on piano. His aunt, India Taylor Johnson (a classmate of Dr. Billy Taylor at Virginia State University), was a vocal music and piano teacher in the Norfolk, VA public school system.

His parents were Ruth Taylor Baker, born Yazoo City, Mississippi, and Dr. T. Nelson Baker, Jr., born Pittsfield, Massachusetts. Newman's mother was an associate professor of English, and his father was head of the chemistry department. He sang bass in the a cappella choir and played oboe in the concert band and the symphony orchestra. His parents played four-hand transcriptions of Brahms and Beethoven symphonies at home. They lived on the campus in faculty housing. Newman's brother, Dr. T. Nelson Baker, III, was Newman's source for recordings of Max Roach and Clifford Brown, Horace Silver, Miles Davis, Cannonball Adderley, Ella Fitzgerald, Art Blakey, and many others.

Newman Taylor Baker received his first drum the Christmas before he turned three; soon he was playing at home with jazz and classical recordings. Growing up on the campus of Virginia State University, he attended performances of leading international artists and orchestras. He was mentored by members of the music faculty. He began formal study of drums at five years as a member of the children's band for the campus elementary school and played in the university concert band from fourth-seventh grade. He was the youngest member of both bands.

As a child, and later as a college student, Baker studied with Virginia State University music faculty members including Dr. F. Nathaniel Gatlin, Dr. Undine S. Moore, and Dr. Thomas C. Bridge. Baker is a graduate of Kent School in 1961 and earned a Bachelor of Science with a major in education from Virginia State University. He went on to study with Fred Begun, solo timpanist National Symphony Orchestra Washington, D.C., and Harold Jones, School of Music East Carolina University at Greenville, North Carolina, where he completed a Master of Music in Education. Settling in New York City, he studied with Saul Goodman, solo timpanist New York Philharmonic Repertoire Institute, and Billy Hart.

== Career ==
=== WashboardXT ===
In 2010, Baker met the washboard working with the Ebony Hillbillies and it changed his life, resulting in Washboard XT and his current pursuit of washboard music for the 21st century. He defines Washboard XT as the combination of the musical and artistic knowledge, skills and creativity accumulated over his 50-year career and the washboard, an instrument embedded with the 19th-century history and culture of his U.S. African heritage. Personally significant for him because his paternal grandfather, Rev. Dr. T. Nelson Baker (1860–1941), the first U.S. African to receive a Ph.D. in philosophy (Yale University, 1903), lived during the heyday of the washboard, a 19th-century tool of drudgery transformed into a musical instrument of pleasure and relief.

Baker extends the washboard language by using expended shotgun shells (a tradition of Southeastern U.S.) on four fingers of each hand, customizing the physical instrument and adding microphones, effects pedals, and amplifiers. This produces a unique sound with more presence, variety, and responsiveness than the traditional thimbles, spoons, or knife handles. Approaching the washboard as a hand drum, touch is central to Newman's performance. He creates a great variety in texture, color, and articulation through the angle of the shells where they make contact, the weight of the arm when contact is made and the number of fingers is used. He found that his sound on the washboard blends with numerous combinations of instruments, and is applicable to a variety of musical genres and styles including but not limited to Jazz (swing, bebop, post-bop, hard bop, avant-garde, free jazz, fusion), Blues (acoustic and electric), World (Brazilian, Colombian, Cuban, Jamaican), Roots, Classical (string orchestra, brass ensembles, woodwind ensembles), Electronic, New Music and Modern Dance.

WashboardXT was featured in ABC7 NY WABC-TV's 2020 Black History Month; played with Vienna Carroll at the American Folk Art Museum; awarded a 2019 NYFA/NYSCA Music/Sound Fellowship; performed with Matthew Shipp in Patricia Nicholson's 70th Birthday Celebration presented by Arts for Art, Inc.; performed for the ESVA Boys and Girls Club in Exmore, VA (2019); participated in "In Dreams Begin Responsibilities: Frank London and Friends" at the New York Public Library (2019), and received a NewMusic USA Project Grant for "2/4/THREE," a performance collaboration with Vincent Chancey which premiered at Roulette Intermedium in Brooklyn (2018). With the Ebony Hillbillies WashboardXT has appeared at the Spoleto Festival in Charleston, South Carolina; Hardly Strictly Bluegrass in San Francisco, California; Port Townsend Blues Camp and Festival in Port Townsend, Washington, three cities in Bulgaria under the auspices of the U.S. Embassy and collaborated with the Irish traditional band Téada on a series of U.S. concerts. Newman has also played washboard with percussionist Warren Smith at the Stone; at the Williamsburgh Music Center with Steve Berrios, Gerry Eastman, Joe Ford and Carlton Holmes, and at the 2013 Washboard Music Festival in Logan, Ohio.

=== Singin' Drums ===
His solo drumset project, Singin' Drums, premiered at the Williamsburgh Music Center in 1995 and grew with projects Virginia Peanuts Meets Buffalo Chips with saxophonist Joe Ford (The Internet Cafe 1996) and Sound of the Drum/Language of the Heart with dancer/choreographer Mickey Davidson (The Internet Cafe/JVC Jazz Festival 1997). In 1997, he collaborated with Horacee Arnold in Dialogue for 2001: A Duet for Drumset, as part of Many Festival, Performance on 42nd, Whitney Museum of American Art. See Discography below for two recordings of Singin' Drums on Innova label. In 1999, Singin' Drums was presented live-in-concert on Jazz Corner, the BETA Award-winning New York cable TV jazz show. As artistic director for A Celebration of the Drum Set: Give The Drummer Some, on the opening night of the Warwick Summer Arts Festival 2001 Warwick, NY, he performed Singin' Drums, and presented guest artists Steve Berrios and Susie Ibarra in solo and trio settings. In 2012, Baker collaborated with his niece, mezzo-soprano Andrea Baker, along with pianist Richard Lewis, on Singin' Drums: Voice and Drum which premiered at the Edinburgh Fringe Festival in Scotland.

=== Touring ===
Baker has performed internationally with Joe Henderson, McCoy Tyner, Kenny Barron, Henry Grimes, John Hicks, Kevin Eubanks, Ahmad Jamal, Yvette Glover, Tom Harrell, James Moody, Lou Donaldson, Gloria Lynne, Frank Morgan, Cecil Bridgewater, Benny Powell, Stanley Cowell, John Blake, Jymie Merritt, Frode Gjerstad, Marilyn Crispell, Bobby Bradford, Leroy Jenkins, Myra Melford, Eileen Fulton, Billy Harper Quintet, Henry Threadgill Sextett, Billy Bang Quintet, Francesca Tanksley Trio, Reggie Workman's Topshelf, Sam Rivers Quartet, Charlie Rouse's Cinnamon Flower, Diedre Murray and Fred Hopkins, Gerry Eastman Quartet, Jeanne Lee Quartet, Craig Harris and Tailgator's Tales, Bern Nix, Bobby Zankel, Abdullah Ibrahim and Ekaya, Ebony Hillbillies, and the Monnette Sudler Quartet. He has participated in USIA tours to Turkey, Poland, Romania, Portugal, Brazil, Argentina, Uruguay, Paraguay, Chile, Peru, South Korea, Taiwan, Singapore, Malaysia, Philippines, Indonesia.

=== Music Theater ===
- Coincidents (music by Leroy Jenkins, libretto by Mary Griffin), 2006, 2005
- Three Willies (music by Leroy Jenkins, libretto by Homer Jackson), 2001
- Running Man, Obie Award (music by Diedre Murray with text by Cornelius Eady), 1999
- Walcott Songs (music by Henry Threadgill, with poetry by Derek Walcott), 1998
- You Don't Miss the Water (music by Diedre Murray, words by Cornelius Eady), 1997
- Mu Lan Pi (music and text by Diedre Murray), 1996
- Unending Pain (music and text by Diedre Murray), 1996
- A Sense of Breath (music by Jeanne Lee, choreography by Mickey Davidson, text by Ntozake Shange), 1991
- National Broadway tours: Jelly's Last Jam, Your Arms Too Short to Box with God, Don't Play Us Cheap, Jesus Christ Superstar, Oliver!, Ann Corio's This Was Burlesque

=== Teaching artist ===
Baker offers clinics and master classes in collaboration with saxophonist Sylwester Ostrowski to music conservatories throughout Poland. With Mickey D and Friends and the Avodah Dance Company, Baker brings dance/music residencies and workshops to schools, communities, and correctional facilities throughout the U.S. He has also led masterclasses through such organizations as Jazzmobile, Young Audiences, and Arts Horizons, and served as faculty at Rutgers University-Newark, Widener College, Livingstone College and Shaw University. Baker also teaches privately.

=== Funding ===
Baker was awarded a New Music USA 2018 Project Grant, two New York Foundation for the Arts Fellowships and grants from Meet The Composer and the National Endowment for the Arts.

== Discography ==
=== As soloist ===
- Drum Suite Life (Innova, 2013)
- The NYFA Collection (Innova, 2011)

=== As ensemble member ===
With Vienna Carroll

- Harlem Field Recordings (Independent, 2020)

With Matthew Shipp

- The Unidentifiable (ESP-Disk', 2020)
- Signature (ESP-Disk', 2019)
- Piano Song (Thirsty Ear Records, 2017)
- The Conduct of Jazz (Thirsty Ear Records, 2015)

With Sylwester Ostrowski and SO Jazz

- Kansas City Here I Come, Deborah Brown Quartet featuring Sylwester Ostrowski with the NFM Leopoldinum and Kevin Mahogany, (Agora S.A., 2016)
- Just Music, Makoto Kuriya and Sylwester Ostrowski Quintet (P-Vine Records, 2014)
- Don't Explain (Jazzmania Nordea, 2013)
- When The Groove Is Low (SO Jazz Records, 2011)

With Jemeel Moondoc

- The Zookeeper's House (Relative Pitch Records, 2014)
- The Astral Revelations (RogueArt, 2018)

With Ted Daniel

- Zulu's Ball – Ted Daniel Plays The Music Of King Oliver (Altura, 2017)

With The Ebony Hillbillies

- Barefoot and Flyings (2011)

With Billy Bang

- Da Bang! (Tum Records, 2013)
- Prayer for Peace (Tum Records, 2010)

With David Schnitter

- The Spirit of Things (CIMP, 2008)

With Henry Grimes

- Live at Edgefest, Ann Arbor, MI (HenryGrimes.com, 2006)
- Sublime Communication (HenryGrimes.com, 2005)

With Bobby Few & Avram Fefer 4tet

- Sanctuary (CIMP, 2006)

With Judi Silvano

- Let Yourself Go (Zoho, 2004)

With Patrick Brennan

- The Drum Is Honor Enough (CIMP, 2004)
- Rapt Circle (CIMP, 2004)

With Carl Grubbs

- Stepping Around the Giant (CIMP, 2002)

With Francesca Tanksley

- Journey (DreamCaller, 2002)

With the Billy Harper Quintet

- Destiny Is Yours (Steeplecase, 1990)
- Live on Tour in the Far East (Steeplecase, 1991)
- Live on Tour in the Far East Vol. 2 (Steeplecase, 1991)
- Live on Tour in the Far East Vol. 3 (Steeplecase, 1991)
- Somalia (Evidence, 1995)
- If Our Hearts Could Only See (DIW, 1997)
- Soul of an Angel (Metropolitan, 2000)

With Yuka Aikawa

- All Beings in the Whole Universal (Kings Records, 1999)

With the Bobby Zankel Trio

- Human Flowers (CIMP, 1996)

With Diedre Murray and Fred Hopkins

- Stringology (Black Saint, 1994)
- Prophecy (About Time, 1991)

With the Bern Nix Trio

- Alarms and Excursions (New World Records, 1993)

With Jeanne Lee

- Natural Affinities (Owl Records, 1992)

With Gerry Eastman

- Songbook (WMC Records, 1995)
- Native Son (WMC Records, 1992)
- My Real Self (WMC Records, 1986)

With the Henry Threadgill Sextett

- Rag, Bush and All (RCA/Novus, 1989)

With Haze Greenfield

- All About You (Black Hawk Records, 1987)

With Monnette Sudler

- Live in Europe (Steeplecase, 1979)
- Brighter Days (Steeplecase, 1978)
- Time for a Change (Inner City Records/Steeplecase, 1977)

With Cullen Knight

- Looking Up (Tree Top Records, 1978)

== Media ==
- One in 7 (Healing Voice-Personal Stories, 2021)
- Meet 'Washboard XT' musician plays washboard in honor of enslaved grandfather (ABC7NY WABC-TV, 2020)
- Interview with Tomasz Dec, host of Kind of Jazz (Akademinicke Radio Pormorze, Szczecin, Poland, 2015)
- Avodah Dance Ensemble with Newman Taylor Baker, Resident Musician (Avodah Dance, 2014)
- Lawrence D. Butch Morris: Black February (Vipal Monga, 2012)
- Billy Bang: Long Over Due (Oscar Sanders/Malcolm Entertainment, 2012)
