= Clarence Seay =

American jazz musician (born 1957)

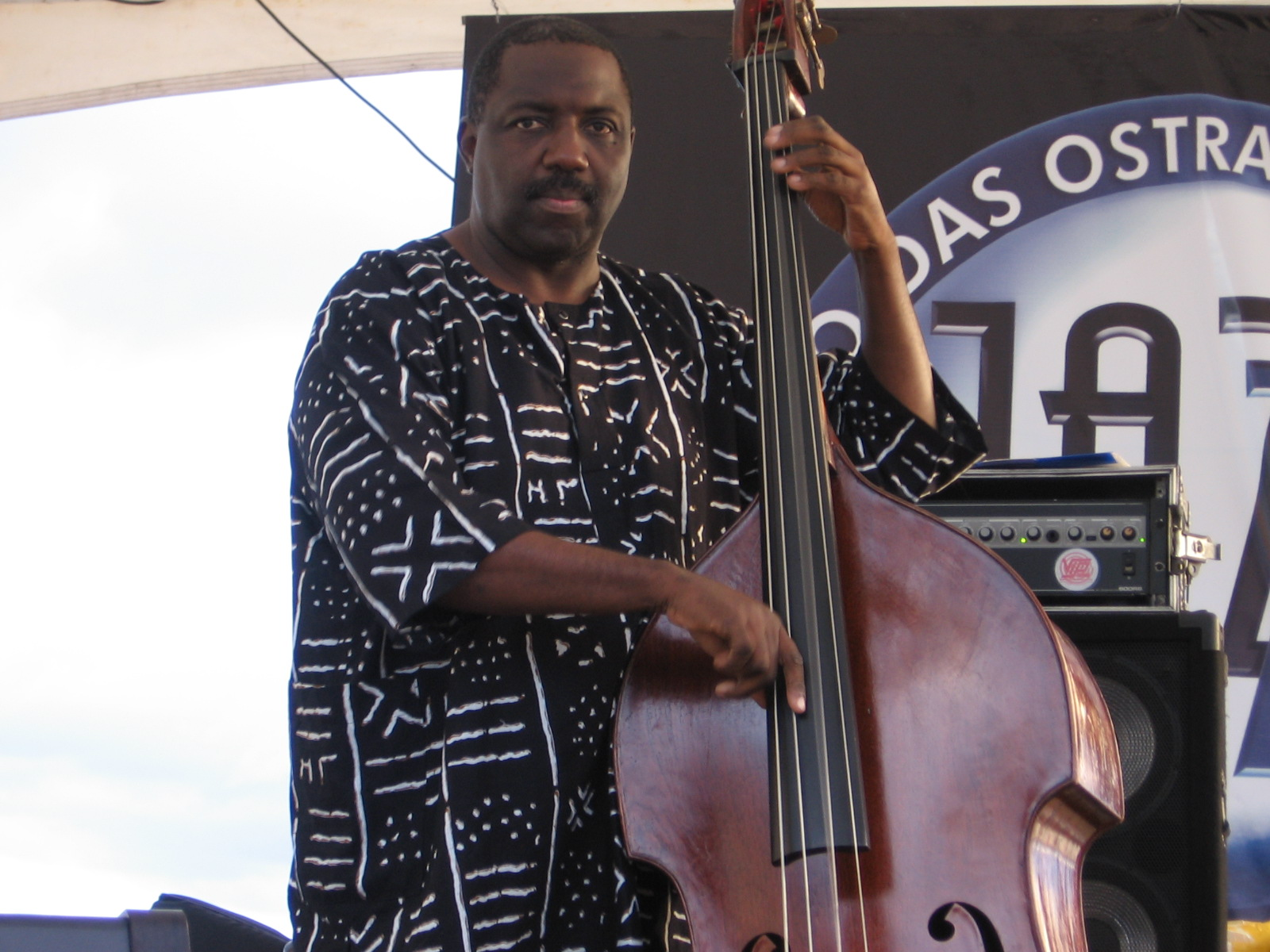

Clarence Seay (born January 7, 1957, Washington, DC) is an American jazz bassist and composer.

He was the bassist with the Wallace Roney Quintet for over 15 years. Seay, also known as "Big C", is a disciple of the Paul Chambers school of jazz bass playing which features a style of walking harmonically inventive bass lines in a robust manner by positioning strings relatively high from the fingerboard – a practice mostly abandoned by modern bass players because of its physical difficulty.

In addition to Roney, Seay has recorded and/or toured domestically and internationally with several renowned jazz artists and groups including Art Blakey and the Jazz Messengers, Wynton Marsalis, Billy Harper, Chico Freeman, Lou Donaldson and the Smithsonian Jazz Works Orchestra.

Seay attended Duke Ellington School of the Arts in Washington, DC, with Wallace Roney and Gregory Charles Royal in the 1970s and attended Howard University with them and pianist Geri Allen in the 1980s. Seay was an adjunct professor at the Virginia Commonwealth University in Richmond for over 10 years in the 1980s and 90s.

He was commissioned by the United States Post Office to compose and perform on their Album Commemorating America's Celebration of Jazz.

== Discography ==
=== As sideman ===
With Wallace Roney

- Mistérios (Warner Bros., 1994)
- Village (Warner Bros., 1997)

With Billy Harper

- Destiny Is Yours (SteepleChase, 1990)
- If Our Hearts Could Only See (DIW, 1998)
- Soul of an Angel (Metropolitan, 2000)
- Blueprints of Jazz Vol. 2 (Talking House, 2008)

With Cindy Blackman

- Arcane (Muse, 1987)
- Telepathy (Muse, 1992 [1994])

With Wynton Marsalis

- Wynton Marsalis (Columbia, 1982)

Gregory Charles Royal (with Geri Allen)

- Dream Come True

David Esleck Trio (with Clarence Penn)

- Three
