= Jon & Billy =

Studio album by Jon Faddis and Billy Harper
- Released: 1974
- Recorded: March 13, 1974
- Studio: Teichiku Studio in Tokyo, Japan
- Genre: Jazz
- Length: 38:24
- Label: Trio PAP 9003
- Producer: Kazuo Harada and Kuniya Inaoka

Billy Harper chronology
Capra Black (1973)	Jon & Billy (1974)	Black Saint (1975)

Jon Faddis chronology
Jon & Billy (1974)	Oscar Peterson & Jon Faddis (1975)

Jon & Billy is an album by trumpeter Jon Faddis and saxophonist Billy Harper recorded in Japan in 1974 and originally released on the Japanese Trio label.

== Reception ==
Professional ratings
Review scores
Source	Rating
AllMusic	3.5/5 stars

On AllMusic Ron Wynn states " the date's value is in hearing where Harper and Faddis, as well as jazz itself, were in the mid-'70s and then comparing how far they and the music have and have not come since then".

== Track listing ==
1. "Jon and Billy" (Roland Hanna) – 6:02
2. "Water Bridge-Mizu Hashi San" (Ron Bridgewater) – 8:06
3. "Ballad for Jon Faddis" (Hanna) – 4:03
4. "Two 'D's from Shinjyuku, Dig and Dug" (Billy Harper) – 7:07
5. "17-Bar Blues" (Hanna) – 5:29
6. "This All-Koredake" (Hanna) – 7:56

== Personnel ==
- Jon Faddis – trumpet
- Billy Harper – tenor saxophone
- Roland Hanna – piano, electric piano
- George Mraz – bass
- Motohiko Hino – drums
- Cecil Bridgewater – kalimba (track 4)
