= Thomas Nelson Baker Sr. =

American philosopher (1860–1941)

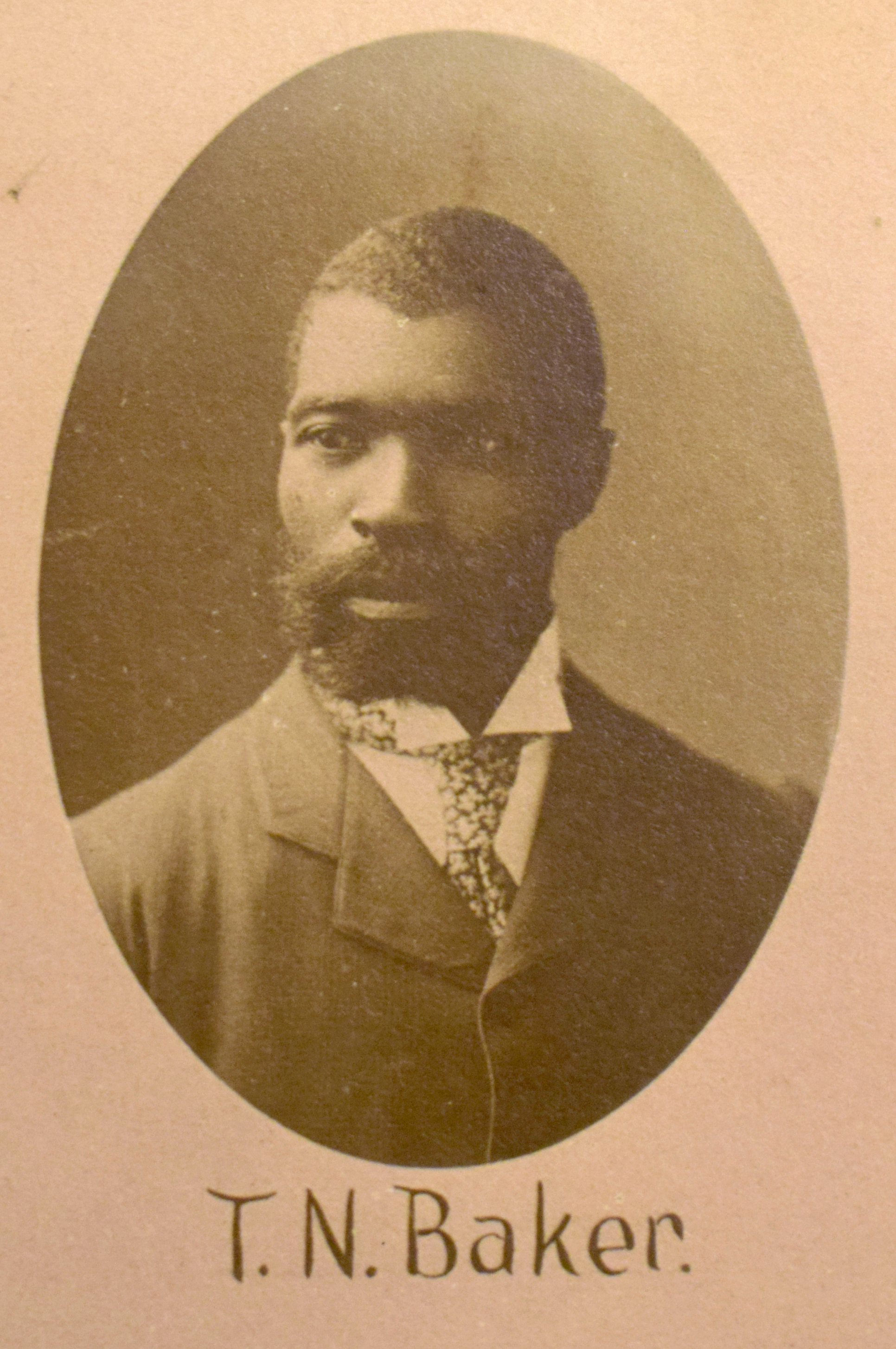
A portrait of Thomas Nelson Baker, Sr. as a student at Yale Divinity School

Reverend Dr. Thomas Nelson Baker, Sr. was a minister, author and philosopher. Born into slavery, Baker was the first African-American to receive a PhD in philosophy in the United States.

== Biography ==
Baker was born in Eastville, Virginia, on August 11, 1860. His parents were Thomas Chadwick and Edith Nottingham Baker, who were slaves on Robert Nottingham's plantation in Northampton County, Virginia.

His father became a Union soldier, and after the Civil War, Baker's mother taught him to read, which was a crime during slavery.

My mother taught me my letters, although I well remember when she learned them herself. My first reading lesson was the second chapter of Matthew, the Bible being the only book we had. I never read a bad book in my life which is one of the blessings I got by being poor. I began to attend the common schools at eight and learned to love books passionately. I used to read through my recesses. Evenings I read the Bible to my parents and grandparents, while they listened with weeping eyes, thankful that I had the great blessing of being able to read.

When he was 12, his father took him out of school, which left him with a burning desire to get an education. After nine years of a "bookless life," he entered the Hampton Institute Normal School program, where he graduated as valedictorian.

To prepare for college, he enrolled at Mount Hermon Boys School in 1886, where he was one of only two black students. He was 25 when he started, and would serve as substitute principal in the summer months. He graduated from Mount Hermon in June 1889. In 1890, he entered Boston University and graduated three years later as the valedictorian of his class. He then studied at Yale Divinity School, where he earned a degree, and was ordained as a minister at a Congregational Church on Dixwell Avenue in New Haven. He continued at Yale, where he was awarded a Ph.D. in philosophy in 1903. His dissertation topic: "The Ethical Significance of the Connection Between Mind and Body."

He left New Haven for Pittsfield to become the minister at Second Congregational Church August 1, 1901, a position he held for 37 years. He succeeded the Rev. Dr. Samuel Harrison.

Baker's ideas on race put him in the middle of the early 20th century debates between W.E.B. DuBois and Booker T. Washington. The philosopher George Yancy has written numerous articles about Baker, explaining that he believed his work had been neglected.

His wife Lizzie Baytop Baker, a leader among African American women in Western Massachusetts, predeceased him. Rev. Dr. Baker died at home from an accidental gas poisoning on February 22, 1941. His son, Dr. T. Nelson Baker, Jr., was the first African American to earn a Ph.D. in chemistry from Ohio State in 1941. His first grandson, Dr. T. Nelson Baker, III, earned a Ph.D. in chemistry from Cornell University in 1963. Newman Taylor Baker, his second grandson, and Andrea Baker, one of his great-grandchildren, are international musical artists.
