= Eddie Henderson (musician) =

American jazz musician (born 1940)

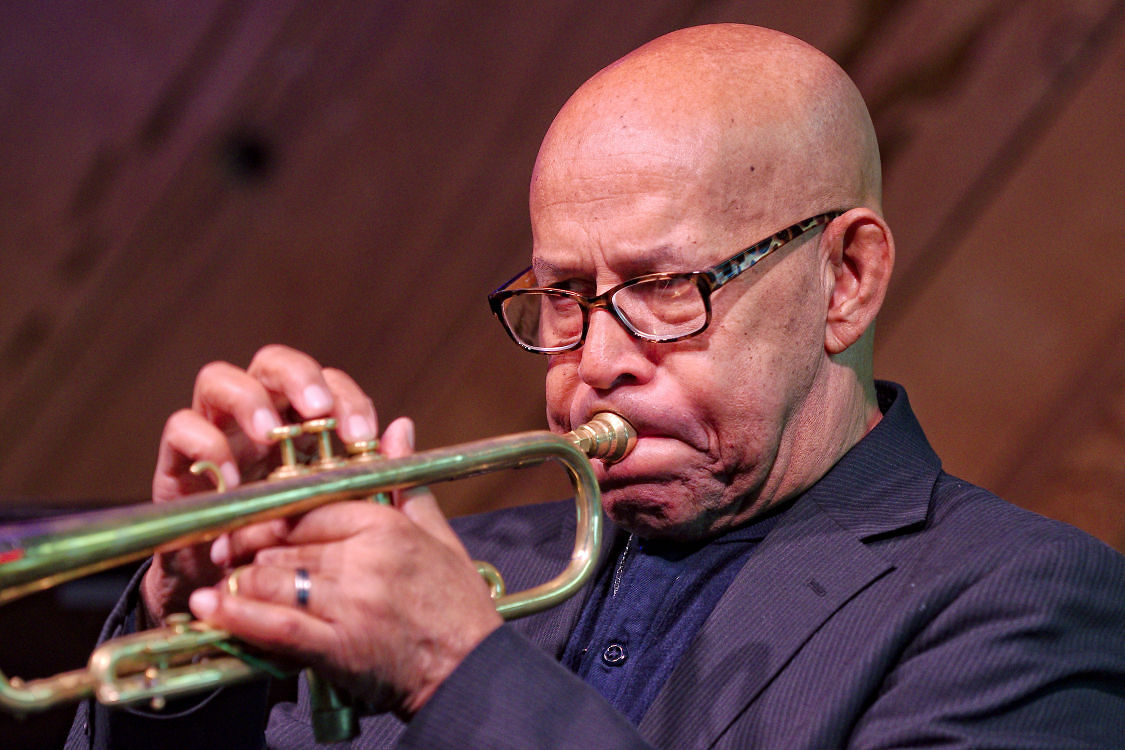
- Eddie Henderson in 2017

Background information
- Born: Edward Jackson Henderson; October 26, 1940 (age 85); New York, U.S.
- Genre: Jazz
- Occupation: Musician
- Instrument: Trumpet
- Years active: 1970–present
- Labels: Capricorn; Blue Note; Capitol; SteepleChase; Milestone

Eddie Henderson (born October 26, 1940) is an American jazz trumpet and flugelhorn player. He came to prominence in the early 1970s as a member of pianist Herbie Hancock's Mwandishi band, going on to lead his own electric/fusion groups through the decade. Henderson earned his medical degree and worked a parallel career as a psychiatrist and musician, turning back to acoustic jazz by the 1990s.

== Family influence and early music history ==
Henderson was born in New York City on October 26, 1940. At the age of nine he was given an informal lesson by Louis Armstrong, and he continued to study the instrument as a teenager in San Francisco, where he grew up, after his family moved there in 1954, at the San Francisco Conservatory of Music.

Henderson was influenced by the jazz musician Miles Davis, who was a friend of his parents. They met in 1957 when Henderson was aged seventeen.

After completing his medical education, Henderson went back to the Bay area for his medical internship and residency. It was a week-long gig with Herbie Hancock's Mwandishi band that led to a three-year job, lasting from 1970 to 1973. In addition to the three albums recorded by the group under Hancock's name, Henderson recorded his first two albums, Realization (1972) and Inside Out (1973), with Hancock and the Mwandishi group.

After leaving Hancock, the trumpeter worked with Pharoah Sanders, Norman Connors, and Art Blakey's Jazz Messengers, returning to the San Francisco Bay Area in 1975 where he joined the Latin-jazz group Azteca and fronted his own bands. Other jazz performers Henderson has played with include Elvin Jones, Johnny Griffin, Slide Hampton, McCoy Tyner, Benny Golson, Joe Henderson, Max Roach, Jackie McClean, Dexter Gordon, Roy Haynes, etc. His discography consists of albums under his name on Capricorn, Blue Note, Capitol, Columbia, Steeplechase, Sirocco, Kind of Blue, Furthermore and Smoke Session Records.

A documentary film about his life titled Doctor Eddie Henderson: Uncommon Genius has been aired on several TV stations and screened at several film festivals since February 2024. Henderson was on the faculty at Juilliard school of music 2007 to 2016 and has been on the faculty Oberlin University jazz department since 2014 and promoted to full professor in 2023.

== Medical career ==
After three years in the Air Force, Henderson enrolled at the University of California, Berkeley, graduating with a B.S. in zoology in 1964. He then studied medicine at Howard University in Washington D.C., graduating in 1968. Though he undertook his residency in psychiatry, he practiced general medicine.

== Personal life ==
Eddie Henderson's father, Eddie Jackson, sang with a popular singing group the Charioteers, and his mother, Vivian Brown, danced as one of the Brown twins at the Cotton club. Eddie Henderson is married to Natsuko Henderson. He has three children from his previous marriages: two sons, Kenny and the late Ronnie, and a daughter, Cava.

His daughter, Cava Menzies, is a musician and educator. Both his wife and daughter contribute compositions to his albums.

== UK success ==
Henderson's only UK hit was the single "Prance On" recorded for Capitol which reached No. 44 in the UK Singles Chart in November 1978.

== Discography ==
=== As leader ===
- Realization (Capricorn, 1973)
- Inside Out (Capricorn, 1974) – recorded in 1973
- Sunburst (Blue Note, 1975)
- Heritage (Blue Note, 1976)
- Comin' Through (Capitol, 1977)
- Mahal (Capitol, 1978)
- Runnin' to Your Love (Capitol, 1979)
- Phantoms (SteepleChase, 1989)
- Think On Me (SteepleChase, 1990) – recorded in 1989
- Colors of Manhattan with Laurent De Wilde (Gazebo, 1990)
- Flight of Mind (SteepleChase, 1991)
- Manhattan in Blue (Videoarts, 1994)
- Inspiration (Milestone, 1995) – recorded in 1994
- Tribute to Lee Morgan with Joe Lovano, Cedar Walton, Grover Washington Jr. (NYC, 1995) – recorded in 1994
- Dark Shadows (Milestone, 1996)
- Dreams of Gershwin (Videoarts, 1998)
- Reemergence (Sharp Nine, 1999)
- Oasis (Sirocco, 2001)
- So What (Eighty-Eight's, 2002)
- Time & Spaces (Sirocco, 2004)
- Echoes (Marge, 2004)
- Precious Moment (Kind of Blue, 2006)
- For All We Know (Furthermore, 2010)
- Collective Portrait (Smoke Sessions, 2015)
- Be Cool (Smoke Sessions, 2018)
- Shuffle and Deal (Smoke Sessions, 2020)
- Witness to History (Smoke Sessions, 2022)

=== As sideman ===
With Kenny Barron

- Live at Fat Tuesdays (Enja, 1988)
- Quickstep (Enja, 1991)
- Things Unseen (Gitanes Jazz, 1997)
- Spirit Song (Verve, 2000)

With Gary Bartz

- Dance of Magic (Cobblestone, 1975)
- Music Is My Sanctuary (Capitol, 1977)
- Reflections On Monk (SteepleChase, 1989)
- The Red and Orange Poems (Atlantic, 1994)

With Norman Connors

- Dance of Magic (Cobblestone, 1972)
- Dark of Light (Cobblestone, 1973)
- Love from the Sun (Buddah, 1973)
- Slew Foot (Buddah, 1974)
- Saturday Night Special (Buddah, 1975)
- Invitation (Arista, 1979)

With The Cookers

- Warriors (Jazz Legacy Productions, 2010)
- Cast The First Stone (Plus Loin Music/Harmonia Mundi, 2011)
- Believe (Motéma Music, 2012)
- Time And Time Again (Motéma Music, 2014)
- The Call Of The Wild And Peaceful Heart (Smoke Sessions, 2016)
- Look Out! (Gearbox, 2021)

With Stanley Cowell

- Talkin' 'Bout Love (Galaxy, 1977)
- New World (Galaxy, 1981)
- Setup (SteepleChase, 1994)

With Richard Davis

- Fancy Free (Galaxy, 1977)
- Way Out West (Muse, 1980)

With Charles Earland

- Leaving This Planet (Prestige, 1974)
- The Dynamite Brothers (Prestige, 1974)

With Ilhan Ersahin

- She Said (Pozitif Muzik Yapim 1996)
- Silver (Nublu, 2019)

With Joe Farnsworth

- Beautiful Friendship (Criss Cross, 1998)
- The Good Life (Smoke Sessions, 2010)

With Benny Golson

- I Remember Miles (Alfa, 1993)
- Terminal 1 (Concord Jazz, 2004)
- New Time, New 'Tet (Concord Jazz, 2009)

With Herbie Hancock

- Mwandishi (Warner Bros. 1971)
- Crossings (Warner Bros. 1972)
- Sextant (Columbia, 1973)
- V.S.O.P. (Columbia, 1977)
- Gershwin's World (Verve, 1998)

With Billy Harper

- Destiny Is Yours (SteepleChase, 1990)
- Live on Tour in the Far East (SteepleChase, 1992)
- Live on Tour in the Far East Vol. 2 (SteepleChase, 1993)
- Somalia (Omagatoki/Evidence, 1994)
- Live on Tour in the Far East Vol. 3 (SteepleChase, 1995)
- If Our Hearts Could Only See (DIW, 1997)
- Soul of an Angel (Metropolitan, 2000)

With Billy Hart

- Enchance (Horizon, 1977)
- Rah (Gramavision, 1988)

With Willie Jones III

- Groundwork (WJ3, 2015)
- My Point Is... (WJ3, 2017)

With Jarek Smietana

- Live at the Jazz Jamboree (GOWI, 1996)
- Autumn Suite (JSR, 2006)

With Buddy Terry

- Lean on Him (Mainstream, 1972)
- Pure Dynamite (Mainstream, 1972)

With Gerald Wilson

- New York, New Sound (Mack Avenue, 2003)
- In My Time (Mack Avenue, 2005)

With Pete Yellin

- Dance of Allegra (Mainstream, 1972)
- Mellow Soul (Metropolitan, 1998)

With others

- Mina Aoe, The Shadow of Love (Victor, 1993)
- Dale Barlow, Hipnotation (Scratch, 1991)
- Bill Barron, Higher Ground (Joken, 1993)
- T. K. Blue, Another Blue (Arkadia Jazz, 1999) – recorded in 1998
- Donald Brown, Sources of Inspiration (Muse, 1990) – recorded in 1989
- George Cables, Morning Song (HighNote. 2003) – live recorded in 1980
- Joe Chambers, Mirrors (Blue Note, 1998)
- Jimmy Cobb, Remembering Miles (Eighty-Eight's, 2011)
- Michael Davis, Trumpets Eleven (Hip-Bone, 2003)
- Steve Davis, Say When (Smoke Sessions, 2015)
- Laurent de Wilde, Off the Boat (Ida, 1988)
- Dilba, Dilba (WEA, 1996)
- Will Downing, A Dream Fulfilled (Island, 1991)
- Ray Drummond, Maya's Dance (Nilva, 1989)
- Pete Escovedo & Sheila Escovedo, Happy Together (Fantasy, 1978)
- Sonny Fortune, From Now On (Blue Note, 1996)
- Rick Germanson, Live at Smalls (SmallsLIVE, 2011)
- Winard Harper, Be Yourself (Epicure, 1994)
- Kevin Hays, Sweet Ear (SteepleChase, 1991)
- Bertha Hope, Elmo's Fire (SteepleChase, 1991)
- J. J. Johnson, The Brass Orchestra (Verve, 1997)
- Azar Lawrence, Mystic Journey (Furthermore, 2010)
- Babatunde Lea, Levels of Conciousness [sic] (Theresa, 1979)
- The Leaders, Spirits Alike (Double Moon, 2006)
- Victor Lewis, Know It Today, Know It Tomorrow (Red 1993)
- Bennie Maupin, Slow Traffic to the Right (Mercury, 1977)
- Ron McClure, Never Forget (SteepleChase, 1991)
- Mingus Big Band, Live in Tokyo (Sunnyside, 2006)
- Butch Morris, Nublu Orchestra Conducted by Butch Morris (Nublu, 2006)
- Mulgrew Miller, Hand in Hand (BMG/RCA, 1993)
- Nicholas Payton, Lew Soloff, Tom Harrell, Eddie Henderson, Trumpet Legacy (Milestone, 1998)
- Courtney Pine, Modern Day Jazz Stories (Antilles, 1995)
- Martha Reeves, Gotta Keep Moving (Fantasy, 1980)
- Justin Robinson, Just in Time (Verve, 1992)
- Pharoah Sanders, Journey to the One (Theresa, 1980)
- Sonny Simmons, Mixolydis (Marge, 2002)
- Archie Shepp, Something to Live For (Timeless, 1997)
- Bill Stewart, Snide Remarks (Blue Note, 1995)
- John Thompson, Romantic Night (AMH 2002)
- McCoy Tyner, Journey (Verve/Birdology 1993)
- Roseanna Vitro, Catchin' Some Rays (Telarc, 1997)
- Mal Waldron, My Dear Family (Alfa, 1994)
- Tim Warfield, Spherical (Criss Cross, 2015)
- Grover Washington Jr., All My Tomorrows (Columbia, 1994)
- Wax Poetic, Three (Doublemoon, 1998)
- Buster Williams, Dreams Come True (Buddah, 1980)
- Lenny Williams, Rise Sleeping Beauty (Motown, 1975)
- Leon Thomas Precious Energy (Mapleshade, 1990)
- Denny Zeitlin, Invasion of the Body Snatchers (United Artists, 1978)
