= Inspiration (Eddie Henderson album) =

Jazz album by Eddie Henderson featuring Manhattan

Studio album by Eddie Henderson
- Released: 1995
- Recorded: July 8 & 9, 1994
- Genre: Jazz
- Length: 71:09
- Label: Milestone MCD 9240-2
- Producers: Todd Barkan and Makoto Kimata

Eddie Henderson chronology
Phantoms (1994)	Inspiration (1995)	Manhattan in Blue (1994)

Inspiration is an album by American jazz trumpeter Eddie Henderson, recorded in 1994 and released in 1995 on the Milestone label. The first nine tracks were previously released on the Japaneses VideoArts label as "Manhattan in Blue."

== Reception ==
Professional ratings
Review scores
Source	Rating
AllMusic	4.5/5 stars
The Penguin Guide to Jazz Recordings	3/4 stars

The AllMusic review by Scott Yanow states, "Throughout Henderson plays in prime form and he takes the majority of the solo space, making this CD an excellent example of his talents". All About Jazz contributor Bob Jacobson noted, "While the influences of Miles and Freddie Hubbard are demonstrated, Henderson is definitely his own man and a master at that. The ensemble work is strong and swinging throughout. ...If you're looking for an album which breaks new ground this isn't it. Otherwise Inspiration satisfies on every level".

== Track listing ==
1. "The Surrey with the Fringe on Top" (Richard Rodgers, Oscar Hammerstein II) - 6:55
2. "I Remember Clifford" (Benny Golson) - 7:03
3. "Jinriksha" (Joe Henderson) - 5:57
4. "Oliloqui Valley" (Herbie Hancock) - 9:24
5. "When You Wish upon a Star" (Leigh Harline, Ned Washington) - 5:52
6. "Phantoms" (Kenny Barron) - 9:12
7. "On Green Dolphin Street" (Bronisław Kaper, Washington) - 5:13
8. "If One Could Only See" (Billy Harper) - 7:30
9. "Little B's Poem" (Bobby Hutcherson) - 5:52
10. "Peresina" (McCoy Tyner) - 8:11

== Personnel ==
- Eddie Henderson – trumpet, flugelhorn
- Grover Washington, Jr. – soprano saxophone (tracks 2 & 4)
- Kevin Hays – piano
- Joe Locke – vibraphone
- Ed Howard – bass
- Lewis Nash – drums
