= Soran-Bushi, B.H. =

Studio album by Billy Harper
- Released: 1978
- Recorded: 15 and 17 December 1977
- Studio: Sound Ideas Studios in NYC
- Genre: Jazz
- Length: 35:40
- Label: Denon YX-7522-ND

Billy Harper chronology
Black Saint (1975)	Soran-Bushi, B.H. (1978)	Trying to Make Heaven My Home (1979)

Soran-Bushi, B.H. is an album by saxophonist Billy Harper recorded in 1977 and released on the Japanese Denon label.

== Reception ==
Professional ratings
Review scores
Source	Rating
AllMusic	3/5 stars

AllMusic awarded the album 3 stars.

== Track listing ==
All compositions by Billy Harper.

1. "Trying to Get Ready" - 10:34
2. "Loverhood" – 8:40
3. "Soran-Bushi, B.H." – 16:26

== Personnel ==
- Billy Harper – tenor saxophone
- Everett Hollins – trumpet
- Harold Mabern – piano
- Greg Maker – bass
- Horacee Arnold, Billy Hart – drums
