= Capra Black =

Studio album by Billy Harper
- Released: June 1974
- Recorded: 1973
- Genre: Jazz
- Label: Strata-East SES-19739
- Producer: Billy Harper

Billy Harper chronology
Capra Black (1974)	Black Saint (1974)

Capra Black is the debut album by American jazz saxophonist Billy Harper. It was recorded in 1973 and released on the Strata-East label.

== Reception ==
Professional ratings
Review scores
Source	Rating
AllMusic	5/5 stars

In his review for AllMusic, Jason Ankeny praised the album, stating "Capra Black remains one of the seminal recordings of jazz's black consciousness movement. A profoundly spiritual effort that channels both the intellectual complexity of the avant-garde as well as the emotional potency of gospel, its focus and assurance belie Billy Harper's inexperience as a leader".

== Track listing ==
All compositions by Billy Harper

1. "Capra Black" - 11:17
2. "Sir Galahad" - 8:00
3. "New Breed" - 4:30
4. "Soulfully, I Love You / Black Spiritual of Love" - 10:34
5. "Cry of Hunger" - 10:46

== Personnel ==
- Billy Harper - tenor saxophone, voice
- Jimmy Owens - trumpet
- Dick Griffin, Julian Priester - trombone
- George Cables - piano
- Reggie Workman - bass
- Billy Cobham, Elvin Jones, Warren Smith - drums
- Barbara Grant, Gene McDaniels, Laveda Johnson, Pat Robinson - voice
