= Trying to Make Heaven My Home =

Studio album by Billy Harper
- Released: 1979
- Recorded: March 3–4, 1979
- Studios: Tonstudio Zuckerfabrik in Stuttgart, Germany
- Genre: Jazz
- Length: 38:21
- Label: MPS 0068.234
- Producer: Joachim-Ernst Berendt

Billy Harper chronology
Soran-Bushi, B.H. (1977)	Trying to Make Heaven My Home (1979)	Billy Harper Quintet in Europe (1979)

Trying to Make Heaven My Home is an album led by saxophonist Billy Harper recorded on March 3 and 4, 1979, at Tonstudio Zuckerfabrik in Stuttgart (Germany) and released on the German MPS label.

== Reception ==
Professional ratings
Review scores
Source	Rating
AllMusic	4/5 stars

In his review for AllMusic, Michael G. Nastos states "A quintet recording for this incendiary tenor saxophonist. An extended, hard-blowing session".

== Track listing ==
All compositions by Billy Harper

1. "Trying to Make Heaven My Home" - 18:00
2. "Inside" - 8:29
3. "Love on the Sudan" - 11:52

== Personnel ==
- Billy Harper - tenor saxophone
- Everett Hollins - trumpet
- Armen Donelian - piano
- Wayne Dockery - bass
- Malcolm Pinson - drums
