= Blueprints of Jazz Vol. 2 =

Studio album by Billy Harper
- Released: 2008
- Recorded: August 8–10, 2006
- Studio: Talking House Productions
- Genre: Jazz
- Label: Talking House Records THR0810-019A
- Producer: Marc Weibel, Stephen Smith

Billy Harper chronology
Soul of an Angel (1999)	Blueprints of Jazz Vol. 2 (2008)	The Roots of the Blues (2013)

Blueprints of Jazz Vol. 2 is an album by saxophonist Billy Harper recorded in 2006 and released in 2008 on the Talking House Records label. It is part of the Blueprints of Jazz series conceived, produced and recorded by Talking House Productions with an aim to expose the histories and current work of important but often lesser-known jazz players who had contributed to the sounds of jazz legends from the 50s, 60s, and 70s. Production and recording of the albums was helmed by Talking House producers Marc Weibel and Stephen Smith

== Reception ==
Professional ratings
Review scores
Source	Rating
AllMusic	4/5 stars

In his review for AllMusic, Michael G. Nastos states "Certainly a celebration for fans of the 65-year-old Harper and a welcome addition to his potent discography, this CD represents him playing at an exceptionally high level, staying true to his spirit, and still making powerful music". In JazzTimes Michael J. West wrote "The album is a tableau of Harper's spiritual jazz, bookended with Amiri Baraka poems on the music's evolution in both America and Africa. When it's on point, Blueprints is brilliant; when it's off, it just misses the mark".

== Track listing ==
All compositions by Billy Harper except where noted.

1. "Africa Revisited" (Amiri Baraka, Billy Harper) – 16:45
2. "Knowledge of Self" (Baraka, Harper) – 9:06
3. "Another Kind of Thoroughbred" – 4:33
4. "Thoughts and Slow Actions" – 5:37
5. "Time and Time Again" – 5:14
6. "Who Here Can Just Our Fates?" – 7:46
7. "Amazing Grace" (Traditional) – 4:03
8. "Cast the First Stone? (...If You Yourself Have No Sins)" – 12:26
9. "Oh... If Only" (Baraka, Harper) – 6:14

== Personnel ==
- Billy Harper – tenor saxophone, vocals
- Amiri Baraka – spoken word (tracks 1, 2 & 9)
- Keyon Harold – trumpet, French horn
- Charles McNeal – alto saxophone (tracks 5 & 8)
- Francesca Tanksley – piano
- Clarence Seay (tracks 1–6 & 8), Louie Spears (tracks: 1–3 & 5–9) – bass
- Aaron Scott – drums
