= If Our Hearts Could Only See =

Studio album by Billy Harper
- Released: 1998
- Recorded: February 17 & 19, 1997
- Genre: Jazz
- Length: 61:40
- Label: DIW DIW-931
- Producer: Kazunori Sugiyama and Billy Harper

Billy Harper chronology
Somalia (1993)	If Our Hearts Could Only See (1998)	Soul of an Angel (2000)

If Our Hearts Could Only See is an album led by saxophonist Billy Harper recorded in 1997 and released on the Japanese DIW label.

== Reception ==
Professional ratings
Review scores
Source	Rating
AllMusic	4/5 stars

In his review for AllMusic, Greg Turner states "This is one of 1997's best releases and a wonderful addition to Harper's slender discography".

== Track listing ==
All compositions by Billy Harper except as indicated

1. "The Seventh Day" – 8:30
2. "Time and Time Again" – 8:06
3. "My One and Only Love" (Robert Mellin, Guy Wood) – 5:28
4. "Egypt" – 6:20
5. "Speak to Me of Love, Speak to Me of Truth" – 7:35
6. "If One Could Only See" – 6:00
7. "The One Who Makes the Rain Stop" – 7:54
8. "I Move Silently Throughout This World" (Billy Harper, Vernel Lillie) – 4:48
9. "World Without End" – 6:59

== Personnel ==
- Billy Harper – tenor saxophone, vocals
- Eddie Henderson – trumpet
- Francesca Tanksley – piano
- Clarence Seay – bass
- Newman Taylor Baker – drums
