= Billy Harper Quintet in Europe =

Studio album by Billy Harper
- Released: 1979
- Recorded: January 24–25, 1979
- Genre: Jazz
- Length: 42:41
- Label: Soul Note

Billy Harper chronology
Trying to Make Heaven My Home (1979)	Billy Harper Quintet in Europe (1979)	The Awakening (1979)

Billy Harper Quintet in Europe is an album by American jazz saxophonist Billy Harper recorded in 1979 for the Italian Soul Note label. The album was the first release for the record label.

== Reception ==
Professional ratings
Review scores
Source	Rating
AllMusic	4/5 stars
The Penguin Guide to Jazz Recordings	3/4 stars

In a review for AllMusic, Jeff Schwachter wrote: "In Europe gives a fine glimpse at the power and intensity of Harper's compositions and his tremendous abilities as an improviser... Highly recommended music for post-bop and free jazz appreciators."

The authors of The Penguin Guide to Jazz Recordings called the album "faintly disappointing," but noted that it is "full of potential and marked by pretty much the same strengths as Harper's other work." They described "Calvary" as "superb."

== Track listing ==
All compositions by Billy Harper

1. "Priestess" - 13:10
2. "Calvary" - 7:32
3. "Illumination" - 21:59
  - Recorded at Barigozzi Studio in Milano, Italy on January 24 & 25, 1979

== Personnel ==
- Billy Harper - tenor saxophone
- Everett Hollins - trumpet
- Fred Hersch - piano
- Louie "Mbiki" Spears - bass
- Horace Arnold - drums
