= Prophecy (Fred Hopkins and Diedre Murray album) =

Studio album by Fred Hopkins and Diedre Murray
- Released: 1998
- Recorded: August 20 and 21, 1990
- Studio: RPM Studios, New York City
- Genre: Jazz
- Length: 49:39
- Label: About Time Records; AT-1009
- Producer: Ed Fishman, Alan Ringel, Larry Shengold

Diedre Murray and Fred Hopkins chronology
Stringology (1994)	Prophecy (1998)

Prophecy is an album by bassist Fred Hopkins and cellist and composer Diedre Murray. It was recorded in August 1990 at RPM Studios in New York City, and was released by About Time Records in 1998. On the album, Hopkins and Murray are joined by guitarist Brandon Ross and drummer Newman Baker.

== Reception ==
Professional ratings
Review scores
Source	Rating
AllMusic	4/5 stars
All About Jazz	4/5 stars

In a review for AllMusic, Thom Jurek called the album "a knotty, steamy, smoky ride through the various entanglements associated with a jazz ensemble whose principals are all string players," and wrote: "The compositions here may be by Murray, and her cello is everywhere, but the depth of feeling and closeness of the ensemble are evidenced here by the gigantic presence of Hopkins, a musician who believed that what made music go from one person to the next was the simple transference of emotion."

Glenn Astarita of All About Jazz described the album as "a wonderfully exciting recording," and remarked: "Besides the abundance of twists, turns and surprises, there are many cohesive elements to this music, which at times borders rock, free jazz and blues; hence, descriptions are difficult. Trying to categorize this music is a daunting task so with that stated, you'll have to hear for yourself. Highly Recommended." Another AAJ reviewer stated: "The... idea behind... Prophecy emphasizes continuity and fluidity of musical thought... Within a fairly straight-ahead setting, soloists trade off with accompanists in very subtle ways... the players come up with some interesting arrangements and improvisational surprises... Occasional forays into a freer sound keep the music from deflating... the iron rock of the group is bassist Fred Hopkins... His depth and focus keep the band grounded."

Duck Baker of Jazz Times commented: "The group sound is very tight, as Murray's compositions reflect classical influence, but there is also a sort of chamber jazz-rock feeling to some of the proceedings... The feeling is very arranged and controlled, sort of like updated Chico Hamilton."

== Track listing ==
All compositions by Diedre Murray.

1. "Eureka" – 8:28
2. "Prophecy" – 7:42
3. "Waterfall" – 11:01
4. "Doo-Wop II" – 8:30
5. "Song for the Lost People" – 5:55
6. "Calypso" – 8:07

== Personnel ==
- Fred Hopkins – bass
- Diedre Murray – cello
- Brandon Ross – guitar
- Newman Baker – drums
