= Firestorm (Diedre Murray and Fred Hopkins album) =

Studio album by Diedre Murray and Fred Hopkins
- Released: 1992
- Recorded: July 12 and 13, 1992
- Studios: East Side Sound Studio, New York City
- Genre: Free jazz
- Length: 56:48
- Labels: Les Disques Victo; CD 020

Diedre Murray and Fred Hopkins chronology
Firestorm (1992)	Stringology (1994)

Firestorm is an album by cellist Diedre Murray and bassist Fred Hopkins. It was recorded at East Side Sound Studio in New York City during July 1992, and was released later that year by Les Disques Victo.

== Reception ==
Professional ratings
Review scores
Source	Rating
AllMusic	3/5 stars
The Penguin Guide to Jazz	3.5/4 stars

In a review for AllMusic, François Couture wrote: "Murray favors a written-down approach; her compositions lay out melodies, phrases, and sections, but also include lots of improvisation and time stretching, and they require the kind of underlying complicity very few are capable of... Strings in jazz... don't have to sound pompous: When freed from all clichés, they can lie somewhere between jazz and classical, while being pledged to neither of them."

David Grundy, writing for Point of Departure, praised the track titled "Dedicated to Wilbur Little," commenting: "Murray plays the melody over Hopkins' arco counter-figurations: an ecstatic yet restrained chorale. Murray's slides and slurs exemplify the cry of the string while her horn-like phrasing, carefully weighing each note, judging each pause, is a masterclass in emotional timing and depth. The music rises and falls like an engraved sigh."

In an article for JazzTimes, bassist Linda Oh also singled out the closing track for praise, and stated: "Bookended by excellent arco work..., this simple, sentimental ballad travels many places. Hopkins' solo interlude explores a range of dynamics and sounds-from striking double stops and hammer-ons, to lush sounds with full vibrato, to the extreme buzzes and rattles his instrument is capable of."

== Track listing ==
1. "Jolly Ollie" – 6:03
2. "Never to Return" – 7:08
3. "Firestorm" – 9:26
4. "Dedicated to Ronnie Boykins" – 5:28
5. "Almost Unison" – 6:13
6. "Systems" – 5:25
7. "Eureka" – 9:23
8. "Dedicated to Wilbur Little" – 7:42

== Personnel ==
- Diedre Murray – cello
- Fred Hopkins – double bass
