= Samuel Harrison House =

Historic house in Massachusetts, United States

- U.S. National Register of Historic Places
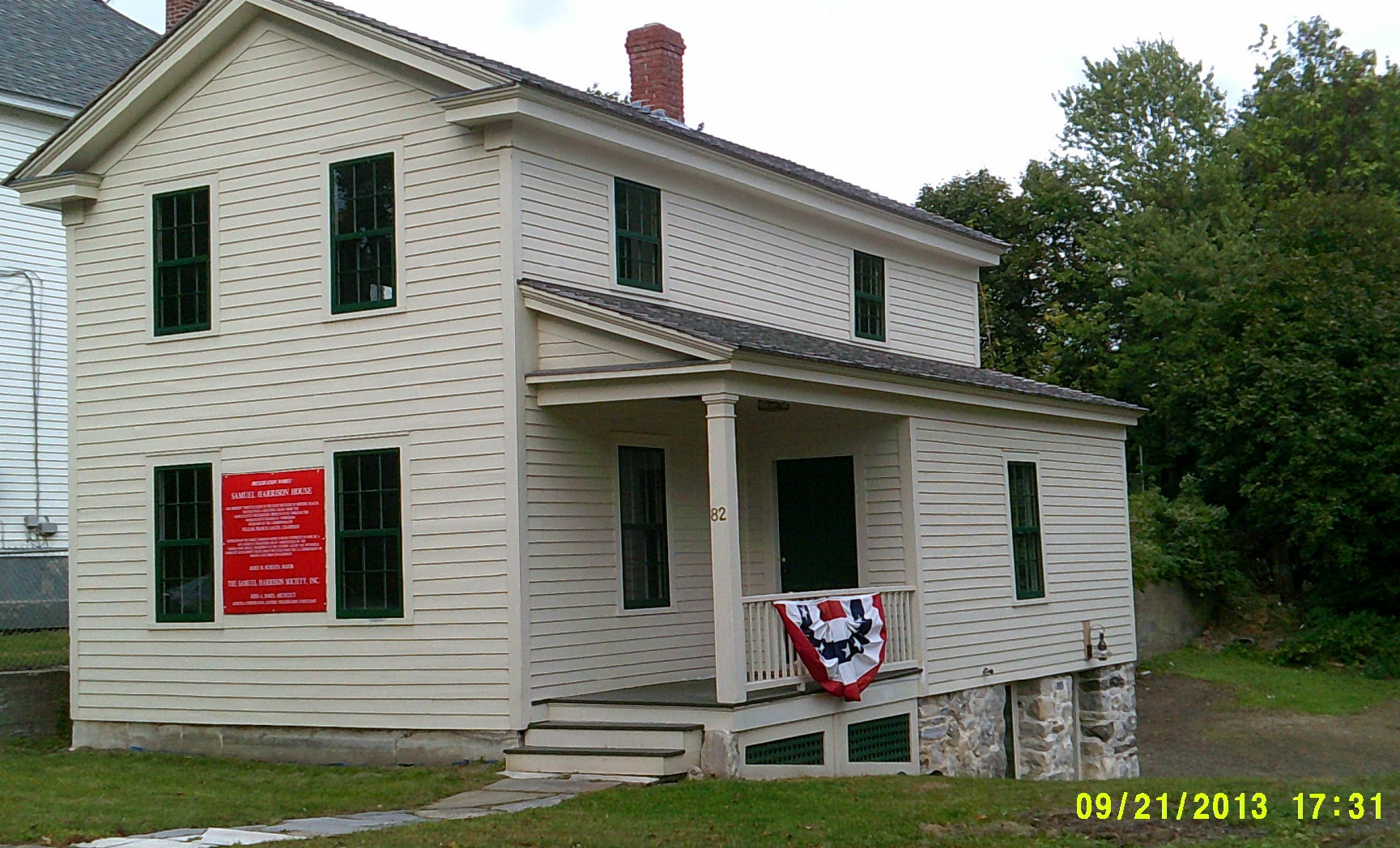

- Location within Massachusetts Location within the United States
- Location: 82 Third St., Pittsfield, Massachusetts
- Coordinates: 42°27′7.86″N 73°15′5.51″W
- Built: 1850
- Architectural style: Greek Revival
- NRHP reference No.: 06000147
- Added to NRHP: March 22, 2006

Samuel Harrison House is a historic house at 82 Third Street in Pittsfield, Massachusetts. Built about 1850, it was for many years home to Rev. Samuel Harrison, a regionally-prominent African-American minister (1818–1900) who served as chaplain to the 54th Massachusetts Infantry Regiment during the American Civil War. It was listed on the National Register of Historic Places in 2006.

== House ==
The Samuel Harrison House stands on the east side of Third Street near its junction with Silver Street in a residential area northeast of Pittsfield's central Park Square. It is a 1 1/2-story plank-framed wooden structure, with a gabled roof, and a shed-roof porch extending along its south side. It has modest vernacular Greek Revival elements, include gable returns and a Doric column supporting the porch, whose rear section is enclosed.

In 2004, the Samuel Harrison Society was formed to save Rev. Samuel Harrison's house from demolition after learning that it had historic value. Now with Rev. Harrison's house on the Registry of Historic Places, the Samuel Harrison Society is committed to restoring and preserving the home.

== See also ==
- National Register of Historic Places listings in Berkshire County, Massachusetts
