= The Awakening (Billy Harper album) =

Studio album by Billy Harper
- Released: 1979
- Recorded: January 29, 1979
- Studio: Studio Ramasès, Paris, France
- Genre: Jazz
- Length: 40:53
- Label: Marge SCCD 31260
- Producer: Gérard Terronès

Billy Harper chronology
| Billy Harper Quintet in Europe (1979) | The Awakening (1979) | The Believer (1980) |

The Awakening is an album by saxophonist Billy Harper. It was recorded in 1979 in Paris and released on the French Marge label.

== Reception ==
Professional ratings
Review scores
| Source | Rating |
|---|---|
| AllMusic | 4/5 stars |
| The Penguin Guide to Jazz Recordings | 3.5/4 stars |

In his review for AllMusic, Thom Jurek states: "This 1979 date by tenor saxophonist Billy Harper is one of his most transcendent. Rife with his deep study of Coltrane's modalism, and his own deep knowledge of the blues and Eastern music, Harper and his quintet take on three extended pieces... This is a winner, top to bottom, and one of the more engaging vanguard jazz outings of the late '70s to come from American soil".

== Track listing ==
All compositions by Billy Harper

1. "The Awakening" - 8:00
2. "Soran Bushi-B.H." - 12:44
3. "Cry of Hunger" - 20:14

== Personnel ==
- Billy Harper - tenor saxophone
- Everett Hollins - trumpet
- Fred Hersch - piano
- Louie "Mbiki" Spears - bass
- Horacee Arnold - drums
