= Youngblood (Jon Faddis album) =

Studio album by Jon Faddis
- Released: 1976
- Recorded: January 8 & 9, 1976
- Studio: RCA Recording Studios, New York, NY
- Genre: Jazz
- Length: 42:12
- Label: Pablo; 2310 765
- Producer: Norman Granz

Jon Faddis chronology
Oscar Peterson & Jon Faddis (1975)	Youngblood (1976)	Good and Plenty (1978)

Youngblood is an album by trumpeter Jon Faddis recorded in 1976 and released by the Pablo label.

== Reception ==
Professional ratings
Review scores
Source	Rating
AllMusic	4.5/5 stars

AllMusic reviewer Scott Yanow stated "Jon Faddis burst onto the jazz scene at an early age, recording a brilliant duo album with pianist Oscar Peterson and this quartet date before disappearing into the studios for a few years. Twenty-two at the time, Faddis (heavily influenced by Dizzy Gillespie but possessing a superior high-note technique) holds his own".

== Track listing ==
1. "Here 'Tis" (Dizzy Gillespie) – 9:55
2. "Gershwin Prelude #2" (George Gershwin) – 9:28
3. "Round Midnight" (Thelonious Monk, Cootie Williams, Bernie Hanighen) – 11:20
4. "Be Bop (Dizzy'z Fingers)" (Gillespie) – 6:11
5. "Samba de Orpheus (Carnival)" (Luiz Bonfá, Antônio Maria) – 6:18

== Personnel ==
- Jon Faddis – trumpet
- Kenny Barron – piano
- George Mraz – bass
- Mickey Roker – drums
