= Stringology (album) =

Studio album by Diedre Murray and Fred Hopkins
- Released: 1994
- Recorded: September 24–27, 1993
- Studio: Sear Sound, New York City
- Genre: Free jazz
- Length: 52:21
- Label: Black Saint; 120143
- Producer: Flavio Bonandrini

Diedre Murray and Fred Hopkins chronology
Firestorm (1992)	Stringology (1994)	Prophecy (1998)

Stringology is an album by cellist Diedre Murray and bassist Fred Hopkins. It was recorded at Sear Sound in New York City during September 1993, and was released in 1994 by Black Saint. On the album, Murray and Hopkins are joined by guitarist Marvin Sewell and percussionists Ray Mantilla and Newman Baker.

In an interview, Murray defined "stringology" as "a language of string playing, a new language, a contemporary language," and Hopkins added: "We take what we know, where we come from, and where we are right now, and then, we put it all together and more ahead of that too."

== Reception ==
Professional ratings
Review scores
Source	Rating
AllMusic	3/5 stars
The Penguin Guide to Jazz	3/4 stars

In a review for AllMusic, Ron Wynn called the music "loose, unpredictable, exciting fare," and wrote: "Their mastery of their respective instruments results in some superb duets with Murray's higher-pitched bowing and Hopkins' plucking and answering lines making remarkable statements. The group explores calypso and tango variations, as well as outside dialogues, inside movements and a concluding blues tune that turns that form upside down. This material is sometimes challenging, sometimes humorous, and never conventional or staid."

The authors of The Penguin Guide to Jazz Recordings stated that Murray "trades too heavily on certain rather limited ideas and these... can't quite be made to last the pace."

== Track listing ==
"Old Nancock" composed by Fred Hopkins. Remaining tracks composed by Diedre Murray.

1. "Doo Wop" – 6:00
2. "Zebra Walk" – 7:26
3. "Calypso" – 6:49
4. "Glass Walls" – 8:14
5. "Relay Replay" – 7:10
6. "Systems" – 8:40
7. "Minute Tango" – 5:12
8. "Old Nancock" – 2:50

== Personnel ==
- Diedre Murray – cello, strumstick
- Fred Hopkins – double bass, strumstick
- Marvin Sewell – guitar, dobro
- Ray Mantilla – congas
- Newman Baker – drums, spoons
