= Live on Tour in the Far East Vol. 3 =

Live album by Billy Harper Quintet
- Released: 1993
- Recorded: May 11, 1991 in Kuala Lumpur, Malaysia
- Genre: Jazz
- Length: 76:12
- Label: SteepleChase SCCD 31321
- Producer: Nils Winther

Billy Harper chronology
Live on Tour in the Far East Vol. 2 (1991)	Live on Tour in the Far East Vol. 3 (1993)	Somalia (1995)

Live on Tour in the Far East Vol. 3 is a live album led by saxophonist Billy Harper recorded in 1991 in Korea and released on the SteepleChase label. The album followed two additional volumes recorded on the same tour.

== Reception ==
Professional ratings
Review scores
Source	Rating
AllMusic	4/5 stars
The Penguin Guide to Jazz Recordings	3/4 stars

In his review for AllMusic, Don Snowden states "maybe this one is the best single disc of the three. It's got the best sound, bright and well-balanced, and fans of extended jazz blowing will appreciate hearing three pieces (the shortest clocks in at just under 21 minutes) on a night when the musicians are really on and totally in synch with one another".

== Track listing ==
All compositions by Billy Harper

1. "Soran-Bushi-B.H." - 23:47
2. "Call of the Wild and Peaceful Heart" - 20:47
3. "Cry of Hunger" - 31:38

== Personnel ==
- Billy Harper - tenor saxophone
- Eddie Henderson - trumpet
- Francesca Tanksley - piano
- Louie Spears - bass
- Newman Taylor Baker - drums
