= Oscar Peterson and Jon Faddis =

Studio album by Oscar Peterson
- Released: 1975
- Recorded: June 5, 1975
- Genre: Jazz
- Length: 44:10
- Label: Pablo
- Producer: Norman Granz

Oscar Peterson chronology
Happy Time (1975)	Oscar Peterson and Jon Faddis (1975)	Zoot Sims and the Gershwin Brothers (1975)

Jon Faddis chronology
Jon & Billy (1974)	Oscar Peterson and Jon Faddis (1975)	Youngblood (1976)

Professional ratings
Review scores
Source	Rating
AllMusic	4.5/5 stars
The Rolling Stone Jazz Record Guide	3/5 stars

Oscar Peterson and Jon Faddis is a 1975 studio album by the Canadian jazz pianist Oscar Peterson, featuring the American trumpeter Jon Faddis.

== Track listing ==
1. "Things Ain't What They Used to Be" (Mercer Ellington, Ted Persons) – 10:23
2. "Autumn Leaves" (Joseph Kosma, Johnny Mercer, Jacques Prévert) – 6:51
3. "Take the 'A' Train" (Billy Strayhorn) – 7:58
4. "Blues for Birks" (Jon Faddis, Oscar Peterson) – 7:22
5. "Summertime" (George Gershwin, Ira Gershwin, DuBose Heyward) – 7:28
6. "Lester Leaps In" (Lester Young) – 6:25

== Personnel ==
Recorded June 5, 1975:

- Oscar Peterson - piano
- Jon Faddis - trumpet
- Norman Granz - producer
