= Soul of an Angel =

Studio album by Billy Harper
- Released: 2000
- Recorded: December 1–2, 1999
- Studio: RPM Studio, NYC
- Genre: Jazz
- Length: 58:51
- Label: Metropolitan MR 1120
- Producer: Stan Chovnick and Billy Harper

Billy Harper chronology
If Our Hearts Could Only See (1998)	Soul of an Angel (1999)	Blueprints of Jazz Vol. 2 (2008)

Soul of An Angel is an album by saxophonist Billy Harper recorded in 1999 and released on the Metropolitan label.

== Reception ==
Professional ratings
Review scores
Source	Rating
AllMusic	4.5/5 stars
The Penguin Guide to Jazz Recordings	4/4 stars

In his review for AllMusic, Michael G. Nastos states "This is a Rock of Gibraltar solid CD, ranking amongst Harper's very best efforts, leaving nothing on the table, and cementing his status as an admirable figure and one of the very best performers, improvisers, and pure players in the idiom. Highly recommended without reservation, and a strong candidate for Jazz CD of Y2K". Writing in JazzTimes Larry Appelbaum noted "the 57-year-old Texas tenor makes the most of every opportunity to sharpen his playing, composing and band leading skills on Soul of an Angel".

== Track listing ==
All compositions by Billy Harper except where noted.

1. "Thine Is the Glory" – 13:40
2. "Credence" – 6:58
3. "It Came Upon a Midnight Clear" (Edmund Sears, Richard Storrs Willis) – 8:49
4. "Let All the Voices Sing" – 8:44
5. "Soul of an Angel" – 12:10
6. "Was It Here...Is It There?" – 8:30

== Personnel ==
- Billy Harper – tenor saxophone, vocals
- Eddie Henderson – trumpet (tracks 1, 2 & 4)
- John Clark – French horn (track 4)
- Francesca Tanksley – piano
- Clarence Seay – bass
- Newman Taylor Baker – drums
