= Somalia (album) =

Studio album by Billy Harper
- Released: 1995
- Recorded: October 18–21, 1993
- Genre: Jazz
- Length: 60:32
- Label: Evidence ECD 22133-2
- Producer: Billy Harper, Mark Rappaport

Billy Harper chronology
Live on Tour in the Far East Vol. 3 (1991)	Somalia (1995)	If Our Hearts Could Only See (1998)

Somalia is an album by the American saxophonist Billy Harper. It was released in 1995 on the Evidence label.

== Critical reception ==
Professional ratings
Review scores
Source	Rating
AllMusic	4.5/5 stars
The Penguin Guide to Jazz Recordings	3/4 stars

The Vancouver Sun determined that "whether by design, osmosis or accident, Harper sounds like Coltrane reincarnate." The Globe and Mail concluded that "the performances tend to be rather cumbersome, thanks to the efforts of not one, but two drummers, Newman Baker and Horacee Arnold."

In his review for AllMusic, Scott Yanow stated: "This CD contains some of Billy Harper's finest playing in years".

== Track listing ==
All compositions by Billy Harper.

1. "Somalia" – 13:37
2. "Thy Will Be Done" – 21:56
3. "Quest" – 12:45
4. "Light Within" – 7:59
5. "Quest in 3" – 4:15

== Personnel ==
- Billy Harper – tenor saxophone, cowbell, voice
- Eddie Henderson – trumpet
- Francesca Tanksley – piano
- Louie Spears – bass
- Horacee Arnold, Newman Taylor Baker – drums
- Madeleine Yayodele Nelson – shekere
