= Destiny Is Yours =

Studio album by Billy Harper Quintet
- Released: 1990
- Recorded: December 1989
- Genre: Jazz
- Length: 68:42
- Label: SteepleChase SCCD 31260
- Producer: Nils Winther

Billy Harper chronology
The Believer (1980)	Destiny Is Yours (1990)	Live on Tour in the Far East (1991)

Destiny Is Yours is an album led by saxophonist Billy Harper recorded in 1989 and released on the SteepleChase label.

== Reception ==
Professional ratings
Review scores
Source	Rating
AllMusic	4/5 stars
The Penguin Guide to Jazz Recordings	3/4 stars

In his review for AllMusic, Greg Turner states "the vastly under-recognized Harper is a master tenor saxophonist who has developed a unique sound on his chosen instrument, sometimes very passionate, sometimes very lyrical. His compositions, characterized by shifting tempos and themes played over insistent vamps, always have a spiritual, uplifting quality to them. ...This is a perfect introduction to the artist's music. ".

== Track listing ==
All compositions by Billy Harper except as indicated

1. "Destiny Is Yours" - 12:44
2. "East-West Exodus" - 13:46
3. "Dance in the Question" (Francesca Tanksley) - 11:06 Bonus track on CD release
4. "My Funny Valentine" (Lorenz Hart, Richard Rodgers) - 5:21 Bonus track on CD release
5. "The One That Makes the Rain Stop" - 10:36
6. "If Only One Could See" - 4:33
7. "Groove from Heaven" - 10:55

== Personnel ==
- Billy Harper - tenor saxophone
- Eddie Henderson - trumpet
- Francesca Tanksley - piano
- Clarence Seay - bass
- Newman Taylor Baker - drums
