= Horace Arnold =

American musician (born 1937)

Horace Emmanuel Arnold, or Horacee Arnold (born September 25, 1937) is an American jazz drummer. He was born in Wayland, Kentucky.

== Career ==
Arnold first began playing drums in 1957 in Los Angeles while he was in the United States Coast Guard. In 1959, he began performing as "Horacee" when he joined a big band led by David Baker; he also played with Roland Kirk and Charles Mingus that year. In 1960 he became the drummer in a trio with Cecil McBee and Kirk Lightsey.

Throughout the 1960s, he worked in jazz with pianist/composer Hasaan Ibn Ali and bassist Henry Grimes, and with the Bud Powell Trio at Birdland. He worked as part of the Alvin Ailey American Dance company on a tour of Asia. Later in the 1960s, he played with Hugh Masekela and Miriam Makeba; following this he studied composition under Heiner Stadler, Hy Gubenick, and classical guitar with Ralph Towner. In 1967 he founded his own ensemble, the Here and Now Company, with Sam Rivers, Karl Berger, Joe Farrell, and Robin Kenyatta.

In the 1970s, Arnold became one of the best-known jazz fusion drummers, playing with Return to Forever, Stan Getz, Archie Shepp, and Billy Harper in addition to releasing two of his own solo albums. Later in the 1970s he formed an ensemble called Colloquium III with Billy Hart and Freddie Waits. In the 1980s Arnold went on to teach at William Paterson College. He worked as a session musician, played with Kenny Burrell, and formed a trio with David Friedman and Anthony Cox.

== Discography ==
- Tribe (Columbia, 1973)
- Tales of the Exonerated Flea (Columbia, 1974)

With Billy Harper

- Soran-Bushi, B.H. (Denon, 1978)
- Billy Harper Quintet in Europe (Soul Note, 1979)
- The Awakening (Marge, 1979)
- Somalia (Evidence, 1993 [1995])

With Roswell Rudd

- Blown Bone (Emanem, 2006; one track)
