= Live on Tour in the Far East =

Live album by Billy Harper Quintet
- Released: 1992
- Recorded: April 27, 1991 in Pusan, Korea
- Genre: Jazz
- Length: 68:42
- Label: SteepleChase SCCD 31260
- Producer: Nils Winther

Billy Harper chronology
Destiny Is Yours (1989)	Live on Tour in the Far East (1992)	Live on Tour in the Far East Vol. 2 (1991)

Live on Tour in the Far East is a live album led by saxophonist Billy Harper recorded in 1991 in Korea and released on the SteepleChase label. The album was followed by two additional volumes recorded on the same tour.

== Reception ==
Professional ratings
Review scores
Source	Rating
AllMusic	4/5 stars
The Penguin Guide to Jazz Recordings	3.5/4 stars

In his review for AllMusic, Don Snowden states "On Tour, Vol. 1 shows an impressive musical range, great command of dynamics and is just loaded with really sharp, smart, excellent music once it hits its stride. And it's probably the least exciting of these three discs released from a tour that should have established Billy Harper's quintet as a major group in the jazz world".

== Track listing ==
All compositions by Billy Harper except as indicated

1. "I Do Believe" - 15:27
2. "Countdown" (John Coltrane) - 5:12
3. "Dance in the Question" (Francesca Tanksley) - 13:41
4. "Insight" - 11:21
5. "If One Could Only See" - 5:01
6. "Croquet Ballet" - 14:50

== Personnel ==
- Billy Harper - tenor saxophone
- Eddie Henderson - trumpet
- Francesca Tanksley - piano
- Louie Spears - bass
- Newman Taylor Baker - drums
