= The Ebony Hillbillies =

American string band

- Origin: New York City, U.S.
- Genres: Old-time, Americana, blues, folk, country, jazz
- Years active: 1980s–present
- Labels: EH MUSIC
- Members: Henrique Prince; William Salter; Gloria Thomas Gassaway; Reggie “A.R.” Ferguson; Newman Taylor Baker; Allanah Salter; Iris Thomas Olden; Dave Colding; Ricky “Dirty Red” Gordon
- Past members: Norris Washington Bennett
- Website: http://www.theEbonyHillbillies.com

The Ebony Hillbillies is an American old-time string band based in New York City.

A recording of their music is held in the archives of the Smithsonian Institution's Smithsonian Center for Folklife and Cultural Heritage.

== History ==
During the 1980s, Henrique Prince began putting together a band due to "an idea of specializing in dance music, because I really liked the idea of the violin as a dance instrument." He also wanted to make "music African Americans used to perform and dance to before they found the blues and jazz and the other stuff became associated with grizzled mountain white guys". Based in New York City, The Ebony Hillbillies began performing on New York subway platforms. As the band continued to perform they were invited to perform in venues such as Carnegie Hall, the Lincoln Center, Washington state's Wintergrass Festival, and the Kennedy Center.

== Members ==
- Henrique Prince: violin, vocals
- Gloria Thomas Gassaway: bones, lead vocals
- Reggie “A.R.” Ferguson: washboard, “cowboy" percussion kit (consisting of organic wood and metal materials)
- William “Salty Bill” Salter: acoustic bass, voice
- Newman Taylor Baker: washboard
- Allanah Salter: vocals

=== Additional members ===
- Ricky “Dirty Red” Gordon: washboard, percussion
- Dave Colding: acoustic bass, vocals
- Iris Thomas: vocals
- AW: banjo, bass

=== Deceased ===
- Norris Washington Bennett: Five-string banjo, mountain dulcimer, lead vocals

== Discography ==
- 2004 — Sabrina's Holiday (EH MUSIC)
- 2005 — I Thought You Knew (EH MUSIC)
- 2011 — Barefoot and Flying (EH MUSIC)
- 2015 — Slappin' A Rabbit - Live! (EH MUSIC)
- 2017 — 5 Miles From Town (EH MUSIC)
