= Live on Tour in the Far East Vol. 2 =

Live album by Billy Harper Quintet
- Released: 1993
- Recorded: April 22, 1991 in Kaohsiung, Taiwan
- Genre: Jazz
- Length: 75:16
- Label: SteepleChase SCCD 31321
- Producer: Nils Winther

Billy Harper chronology
Live on Tour in the Far East (1991)	Live on Tour in the Far East Vol. 2 (1993)	Live on Tour in the Far East Vol. 3 (1991)

Live on Tour in the Far East Vol. 2 is a live album led by saxophonist Billy Harper recorded in 1991 in Taiwan and released on the SteepleChase label. The album was the second of three volumes recorded on the same tour.

== Reception ==
Professional ratings
Review scores
Source	Rating
AllMusic	4/5 stars
The Penguin Guide to Jazz Recordings	4/4 stars

In his review for AllMusic, Don Snowden states "It's just exceptional jazz that constantly engages the listener, following its own flow and internal logic and continually changing up on your expectations...which is a pretty good basic blueprint of what all great jazz should strive for".

== Track listing ==
All compositions by Billy Harper except as indicated

1. "Priestess" - 17:39
2. "Trying to Make Heaven My Home" - 25:52
3. "My Funny Valentine" (Lorenz Hart, Richard Rodgers) - 9:12
4. "Destiny Is Yours" - 12:35

== Personnel ==
- Billy Harper - tenor saxophone
- Eddie Henderson - trumpet
- Francesca Tanksley - piano
- Louie Spears - bass
- Newman Taylor Baker - drums
