= Samuel Harrison (minister) =

Abolitionist, former slave, preacher, and Army chaplain (1818–1900)

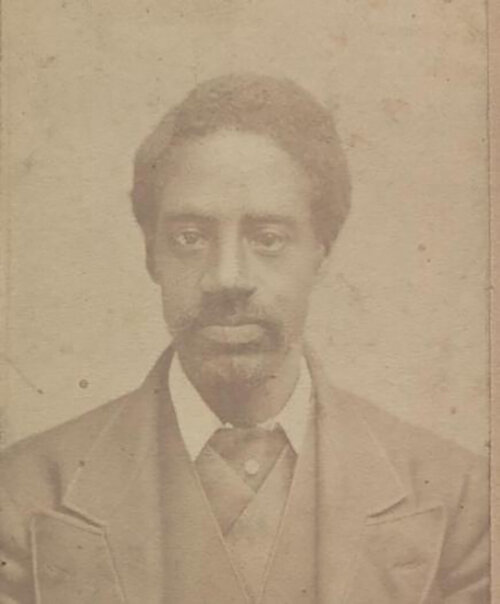
- Born: 1818; Philadelphia, Pennsylvania
- Died: August 11, 1900 (aged 82)
- Occupations: abolitionist; preacher; Army chaplain

Samuel Harrison (April 15, 1818 – August 11, 1900) was a black American abolitionist, former slave, preacher, and Army chaplain who operated largely in and around New England. He was a staunch writer and orator against slavery and racism, eventually convincing President Abraham Lincoln to enact equal pay for black chaplains.

== Birth and early life ==
Samuel Harrison was born into slavery on April 15th, 1818 in Philadelphia, Pennsylvania, and was freed along with his mother in 1821. As a young man he was an apprentice shoemaker for his uncle when he felt a call towards being a minister. He began his education at the Peterboro Manual Labor School in Peterboro, New York, but as it closed shortly after his arrival, at the suggestion of Gerrit Smith, the school's founder and patron, he moved to Western Reserve College and Preparatory School in Hudson, Ohio, where he studied from 1836 to 1839 and from which he graduated. During this time Harrison married his childhood sweetheart, Ellen Rhodes, and they later had 13 children. He was ordained and began work as the first minister of the 2nd Congregational Church of Pittsfield, Massachusetts.

== Military service and equal pay debate ==
In 1862, Rev. Harrison resigned from the church and worked for the National Freedman's Relief Society during the American Civil War charged with helping the blacks on Georgia's sea islands.

In July 1863, the 54th Regiment Massachusetts Volunteer Infantry, the first all-black unit in the North during the Civil War, spearheaded the assault on Fort Wagner in Charleston, South Carolina. The regiment suffered heavy losses. Massachusetts Governor John A. Andrew sent Rev. Harrison to South Carolina to express the sympathies of the Commonwealth to the men of the 54th. Later that year, Rev. Harrison received a commission as chaplain and was mustered into the 54th, thus becoming one of 19 African-American chaplains during the Civil War. During this time, Rev. Harrison protested the unequal pay gap between white and black chaplains. His friendship with Massachusetts Governor John Albion Andrew allowed him enough sway for Andrew to draft a letter to Abraham Lincoln requesting that he end the racist practice, naming Rev. Harrison and describing his unequal experiences. In 1864, not a year later, President Lincoln equalized the pay scale.

In 1864, Rev. Harrison was honorably discharged for health reasons. He would work for the National Freedman's Relief Society until the war ended.

== Later life, death, and legacy ==
After being honorably discharged from the Army, Rev. Harrison ministered at several different churches in multiple Northeastern states. In the states of Rhode Island, Massachusetts, and Maine he wrote pieces against the state of racial dynamics during the era of Reconstruction. He wrote his memoir, Rev. Samuel Harrison: His Life Story, printed in 1899, and in 1872 returned to pastor the Second Congregational Church of Pittsfield. During this time, Rev. Harrison would have 3 sermons printed. He died on August 11, 1900, in the city where he had begun his ministry. His house in Pittsfield, Massachusetts, deemed the Samuel Harrison House, was placed on the National Register of Historic Places on March 22nd, 2006.

== Publications ==
- Harrison, Samuel (1899). Rev. Samuel Harrison His Life Story told by himself.
- Harrison, Samuel (1877). An appeal of a colored man, to his fellow-citizens of a fairer hue. Pittsfield, Massachusetts: Chickering & Axtell.
- Harrison, Samuel (1876). Shall a nation be born at once? A centennial sermon delivered in the chapel of the Methodist Episcopal Church, July 2, 1876.
- Harrison, Samuel (1874). Pittsfield twenty-five years ago. Pittsfield, Massachusetts.

== Media ==
- A Trumpet at the Walls of Jericho: The Untold Story of Samuel Harrison, PBS, 2005.

== Memorial tablet ==
Funds were raised by area citizens and a tablet was donated to the Second Congregational Church in memory of Harrison on December 11, 1902. The inscription, written by Anna L. Dawes, reads as follows;

In Memory of the Reverend Samuel Harrison. Ordained and Settled over this Church as its First Minister, 1850-1862. Again its Minister from 1872 until his death. Member of the Association of Congregational Ministers of Berkshire County for Forty Years. Chaplain 54th Massachusetts Volunteers, 1862. A Wise Leader, an Honored Citizen, an Ardent Patriot, a beloved Messenger of the Lord, he wrought well for his People, his Country and his God. I have Fought a good Fight. I have finished my Course. I have kept the Faith. Henceforth, there is laid up for me a crown of Righteousness.

== See also ==
- Abolitionism

== Archival materials ==
- Documents concerning Samuel Harrison found in the Abraham Lincoln Papers in the Library of Congress:
  - Commission from Massachusetts Governor John A. Andrew for Samuel Harrison as "Chaplain in the 54th Massachusetts", September 8, 1863.
  - Muster-in as commissioned officer November 12, 1863, for three years, "by commission from the Governor of Massachusetts".
  - Letter from Massachusetts Governor John A. Andrew to Lincoln, April 4, 1864, strongly supporting Harrison's request for equal pay.
  - Letter from Attorney General Edward Bates to Lincoln, April 23, 1864, about the "Case of Samuel Harrison" (11 pages)
  - Resolution of the U.S. Senate, April 30, 1864, requesting Lincoln send to Congress "any opinion of the Attorney General on the rights of colored persons in the army or volunteer service of the United States".
  - Letter from John A. Andrew to Lincoln on behalf of Harrison "and also of all the non-commissioned officers and privates of the 54th and 55th Regiments of Massachusetts Infantry Volunteers", "than whom none have been more distinguished for toilsome work in the trenches, fatigue duty in camp, and conspicuous valor and endurance in battle". "After having waited during a reasonable time, for the consideration of the subject by your Excellency, — I do hereby respectfully claim, and so much as in me lies, I do by this appeal to Your Excellency, hereby demand of and from the Executive Department of the Government of the United States the just, full, and immediate payment to all the aforesaid officers and men, of the sums of money now due to them as volunteer soldiers of the United States serving in the field."
- Letter of Lincoln to Bates, June 24, 1864.
- Attorney General Bates' lengthy letter to Lincoln of July 18, 1864, recommending colored and white soldiers be paid the same, was published by David Garrison in The Liberator on December 16, 1864.
