= Jon Faddis =

American jazz trumpeter, composer, and conductor (born 1953)

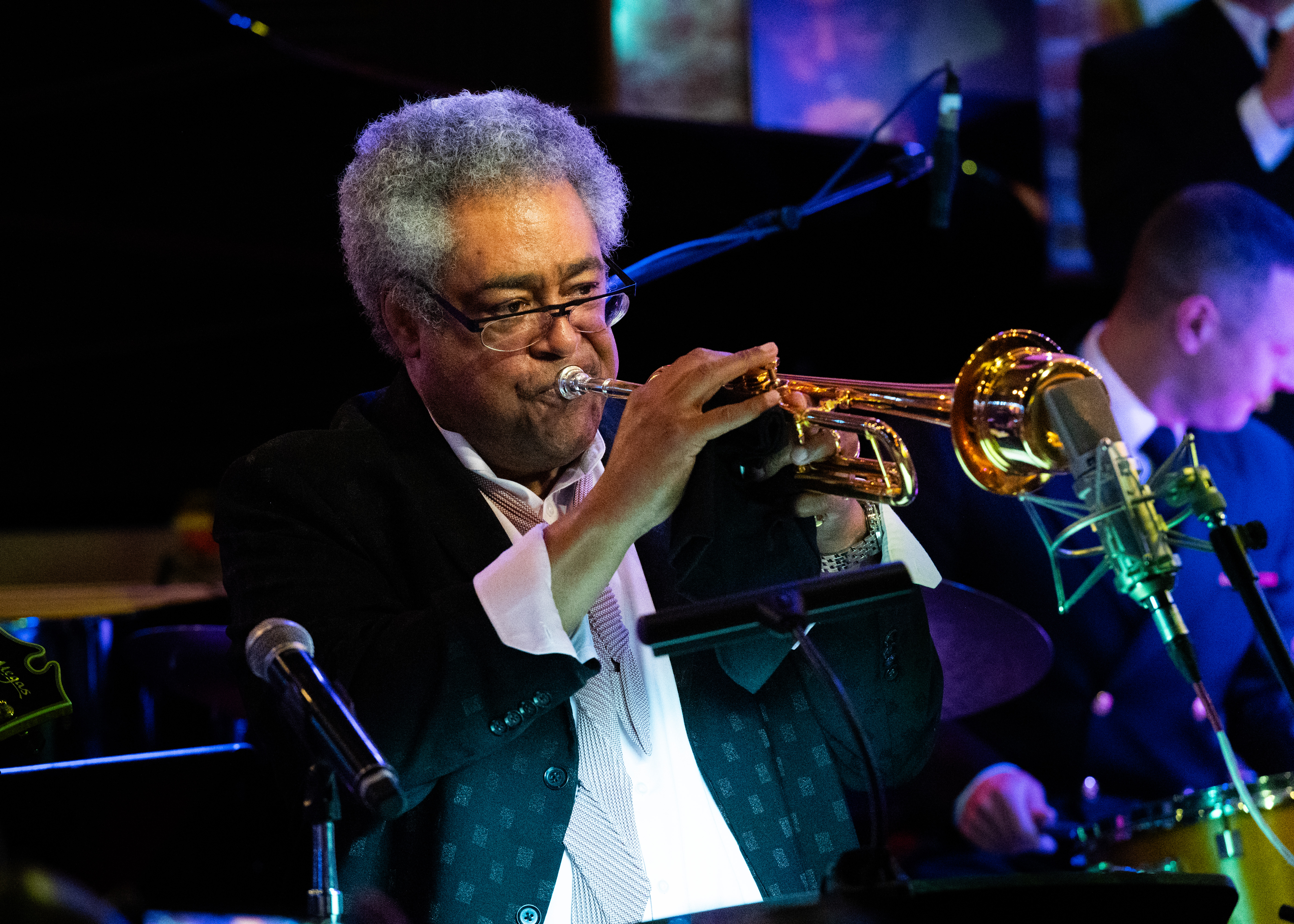
- Faddis performing in 2025

Background information
- Born: July 24, 1953 (age 73); Oakland, California, U.S.
- Genres: Bebop; jazz
- Occupations: Musician; Conductor; Composer; Educator
- Instruments: Trumpet; flugelhorn
- Years active: 1971–present
- Website: www.jonfaddis.net

Jon Faddis (born July 24, 1953) is an American jazz trumpet player, conductor, composer, and educator, renowned for both his playing and for his expertise in the field of music education. Upon his first appearance on the scene, he became known for his ability to closely mirror the sound of trumpet icon Dizzy Gillespie, who was his mentor along with pianist Stan Kenton and trumpeter Bill Catalano.

== Biography ==
Jon Faddis was born in Oakland, California, United States. He played trumpet in the Oakland Symphony's Youth Chamber Orchestra, directed by composer Robert Hughes. In 1970 he participated in the YCO historic performance program and tour of "The Black Composer in America" to the American South, later recorded on the Desto label. At 18, he joined Lionel Hampton's big band before joining the Thad Jones/Mel Lewis Orchestra as lead trumpet. After playing with Charles Mingus in his early twenties, Faddis became a noted studio musician in New York City, appearing on many pop recordings in the late 1970s and early 1980s.

One such recording was the Players Association's cover of "Disco Inferno", from their LP Born to Dance (1977), on which he plays trumpet. In the mid-1980s, he left the studios to continue to pursue his solo career, which resulted in albums such as Legacy (1985), Into the Faddisphere (1989) and Hornucopia (1991). He became the director and main trumpet soloist of the Dizzy Gillespie 70th Birthday Big Band and Dizzy's United Nation Orchestra.

From 1992 to 2002, Faddis led the Carnegie Hall Jazz Band (CHJB) at Carnegie Hall, conducting more than 40 concerts in ten years, during which time the CHJB presented over 135 musicians, featured over 70 guest artists, and premiered works by over 35 composers and arrangers at Carnegie Hall.

In 1997, Faddis composed the jazz opera Lulu Noire, which was presented at USA in Charleston, South Carolina, as well as at the American Music Theater Festival in Philadelphia.

Faddis appeared in the 1998 movie Blues Brothers 2000, playing trumpet with the Louisiana Gator Boys.

In 1999, Faddis released the Grammy Award-nominated Remembrances (Chesky Records), which was composed almost entirely of ballads and featured work from Argentinian composer/arranger Carlos Franzetti.

Faddis also led the Dizzy Gillespie Alumni All-Stars and the Dizzy Gillespie Alumni All-Stars Big Band from their inception in 1998 through 2004, when he was appointed artistic director of the Chicago Jazz Ensemble (CJE), based at Columbia College Chicago in Illinois. Faddis led the CJE from autumn 2004 though spring 2010, premiering significant new works, pioneering educational initiatives in Chicago public schools focusing on Louis Armstrong's music, and bringing the CJE into new venues (including presenting the first of the "Made in Chicago" Jazz series at the Pritzker Pavilion in Millennium Park), while concurrently leading the Jon Faddis Jazz Orchestra of New York (the successor to the Carnegie Hall Jazz Band).

In 2006, the Jon Faddis Quartet released the CD Teranga (Koch Records, now E1), featuring guests including Clark Terry, Russell Malone, Gary Smulyan, and Frank Wess.

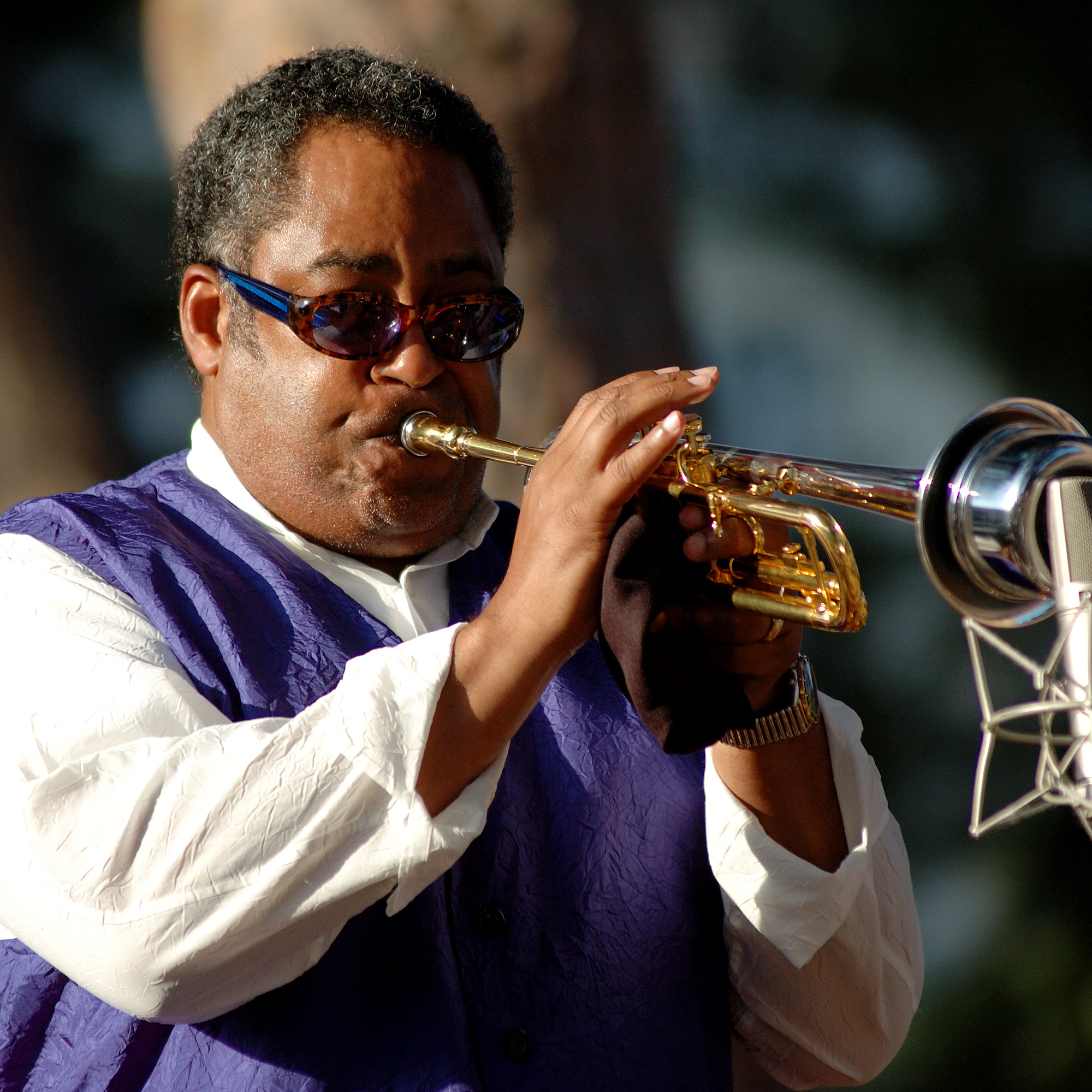
Faddis performing in 2007

As of May 2010, Faddis leads the JFJONY, while continuing also to lead the Jon Faddis Quartet and the JFQ+2. The JFJONY headlined The Kennedy Center's New Year's Eve performance in December 2010 (available as a podcast on NPR's JazzSet); the JFJONY has also performed at the Kimmel Center in Philadelphia, the Performing Arts Center in Westchester, New York, the Newport Jazz Festival and other venues.

Faddis is also a noted educator for jazz and the trumpet. Faddis has taught – and continues to teach – at the Conservatory of Music at Purchase College-SUNY, in Westchester, New York, where he teaches trumpet, classes, and an ensemble. He also leads master classes, clinics and workshops around the world, often bringing students to his gigs and allowing them to sit in, and has produced a number of CDs for up-and-coming musicians.

In July 2011, he played a tribute to Miles Davis at the Prague Castle, hosted by the Czech President, Václav Klaus, accompanied by Lenny White on drums, Jaroslav Jakubovič on baritone saxophone, Tom Barney on bass and Emil Viklický on piano.

Faddis is a Schilke Performing Artist, performing on the Schilke "Faddis" model trumpet. He has played Schilke instruments since 1970, encompassing nearly his entire career and complete discography.

For 2026 Grammy Awards, he received a nomination for the album The Original Influencers: Dizzy, Chano & Chico Arturo O'Farrill & The Afro Latin Jazz Orchestra in the Best Latin Jazz Album category.

== Family and personal life ==
Faddis has been a resident of Teaneck, New Jersey.

Faddis is the uncle of Madlib and Oh No, acclaimed hip-hop producers.

== Discography ==
=== As leader ===
- 1974 Jon & Billy (Trio)
- 1976 Youngblood (Pablo)
- 1978 Good and Plenty (Buddah)
- 1985 Legacy (Concord Jazz)
- 1989 Into the Faddisphere (Epic)
- 1991 Hornucopia (Epic)
- 1996 The Carnegie Hall Jazz Band / Music Director Jon Faddis (Blue Note)
- 1997 Swing Summit: Passing the Torch, Vol. 1 (Blue Chip)
- 1997 Eastwood After Hours: Live at Carnegie Hall (Malposo/Warner Bros.)
- 1998 Remembrances (Chesky)
- 2006 Teranga (Koch)

=== As sideman ===
With George Benson

- Body Talk (CTI, 1973)
- In Your Eyes (Warner Bros., 1983)
- 20/20 (Warner Bros. 1985)
- Big Boss Band (Warner Bros., 1990)

With Ron Carter

- Parade (Milestone, 1979)
- Empire Jazz (RSO, 1980)

With Eric Clapton

- August (Warner Bros., 1986)
- Journeyman (Reprise, 1989)

With Charles Earland

- Intensity (Prestige, 1972)
- Charles III (Prestige, 1973)
- The Dynamite Brothers (Prestige, 1973)
- Kharma (Prestige, 1974)

With Aretha Franklin

- Love All the Hurt Away (Arista, 1981)
- Get It Right (Arista, 1983)

With Dizzy Gillespie

- Dizzy Gillespie Jam (Pablo, 1977)
- To Diz with Love (Telarc, 1992)

As Music Director for the Dizzy Gillespie Alumni All-Stars

- Dizzy's 80th Birthday Party (Shanachie, 1997)
- Dizzy's World (Shanachie, 1999)
- Things to Come (Telarc/McG Jazz, 2002)

With Grant Green

- The Main Attraction (Kudu, 1976)
- Easy (Versatile, 1978)

With the Thad Jones - Mel Lewis Big Band

- Potpourri (The Thad Jones/Mel Lewis Orchestra album) (Philadelphia International, 1974)
- Live in Munich (A&M/Horizon, 1976)

With O'Donel Levy

- Dawn of a New Day (Groove Merchant, 1973)
- Simba (Groove Merchant, 1974)

With Charles Mingus

- Charles Mingus and Friends in Concert (Columbia, 1972)
- Mingus at Carnegie Hall (Atlantic, 1974)

With Mingus Dynasty

- Live at the Theatre Boulogne-Billancourt/Paris, Vol. 1 (Soul Note, 1988)
- Live at the Theatre Boulogne-Billancourt/Paris, Vol. 2 (Soul Note, 1988)

With Lou Reed

- Sally Can't Dance (RCA, 1974)
- New Sensations (RCA, 1984)

With Lalo Schifrin

- Black Widow (CTI, 1976)
- More Jazz Meets the Symphony (Atlantic, 1993)
- Firebird: Jazz Meets the Symphony No. 3 (Four Winds, 1995)
- Lalo Schifrin with WDR Big Band: Gillespiana in Cologne (Aleph, 1998)
- Latin Jazz Suite (Aleph, 1999)
- Ins and Outs and Lalo Live at the Blue Note (Aleph, 2003)

With Johnny "Hammond" Smith

- The Prophet (Kudu, 1972)
- Higher Ground (Kudu, 1973)

With Leon Spencer

- Where I'm Coming From (Prestige, 1973)
- Something Real (Elektra, 1989)

With Stanley Turrentine

- The Man with the Sad Face (Fantasy, 1976)
- Nightwings (Fantasy, 1977)

With Gerald Wilson

- New York, New Sound (Mack Avenue, 2003)
- In My Time (Mack Avenue, 2005)
- Monterey Moods (Mack Avenue, 2007)
- Detroit (Mack Avenue, 2009)

With Tatsuro Yamashita

- Circus Town (RCA, 1976)
- Pocket Music (Moon, 1986)
- Boku No Naka No Syounen (Moon, 1988)

With others

- Faye Carol, Faye Sings The Blues (Getdown Records, 2026)
- Peter Allen, Continental American (A&M, 1974)
- Patti Austin, The Real Me (Qwest, 1988)
- Anthony Braxton, Creative Orchestra Music 1976 (Arista, 1976)
- Rusty Bryant, Until It's Time for You to Go (Prestige, 1974)
- Kenny Burrell, Ellington Is Forever (Fantasy, 1975)
- Michel Camilo, One More Once (Columbia, 1994)
- Linda Clifford, I'll Keep on Lovin' You (Capitol, 1982)
- Hank Crawford, I Hear a Symphony (Kudu, 1975)
- Bo Diddley, Big Bad Bo (Chess, 1974)
- Gil Evans, Live at the Public Theater (New York 1980) (Trio, 1981)
- Jerry Fielding, The Gauntlet (Soundtrack) (Warner Bros., 1977)
- Michael Franks, Skin Dive (Warner Bros., 1985)
- Gene Harris, Tribute to Count Basie (Concord Jazz, 1988)
- Groove Holmes, New Groove (Groove Merchant, 1974)
- Milt Jackson, Bebop (East West, 1988)
- Mick Jagger, Primitive Cool (CBS, 1987)
- Billy Joel, An Innocent Man (Columbia, 1983)
- Chaka Khan, Destiny (Warner Bros. Records, 1986)
- Julian Lennon, Valotte (Atlantic, 1984)
- Les McCann, Another Beginning (Atlantic, 1974)
- Jack McDuff, The Fourth Dimension (Cadet, 1974)
- Jimmy McGriff, Red Beans (Groove Merchant, 1976)
- Bette Midler, Thighs and Whispers (Atlantic, 1979)
- Blue Mitchell, Many Shades of Blue (Mainstream, 1974)
- David "Fathead" Newman, Scratch My Back (Prestige, 1979)
- Jimmy Owens, Headin' Home (A&M/Horizon, 1978)
- Jaco Pastorius, Invitation (Warner Bros., 1983)
- Oscar Peterson, Oscar Peterson & Jon Faddis (Pablo, 1975)
- Don Sebesky, The Rape of El Morro (CTI, 1975)
- Marlena Shaw, Take a Bite (Columbia, 1979)
- Carly Simon, Hello Big Man (Warner Bros., 1983)
- Paul Simon, Graceland (Warner Bros., 1986)
- Lonnie Liston Smith, Reflections of a Golden Dream (RCA/Flying Dutchman, 1976)
- Phoebe Snow, Against the Grain (Columbia, 1978)
- Candi Staton, Candi Staton (Warner Bros., 1980)
- Jeremy Steig, Firefly (CTI, 1977)
- Gábor Szabó, Macho (Salvation, 1975)
- Charles Tolliver, Impact (Strata-East, 1975)
- Tina Turner, Love Explosion (EMI, 1979)
- Steve Turre, The Rhythm Within (Antilles, 1995)
- Frankie Valli, Closeup (Private Stock, 1975)
- Cedar Walton, Beyond Mobius (RCA, 1976)
- Randy Weston, Tanjah (Polydor, 1973)
