= Black Saint (album) =

Studio album by Billy Harper
- Released: 1975
- Recorded: July 21–22, 1975
- Genre: Jazz
- Length: 41:10
- Label: Black Saint
- Producer: Giacomo Pellicciotti

Billy Harper chronology
Jon & Billy (1974)	Black Saint (1975)	Soran-Bushi, B.H. (1977)

Black Saint is an album by American jazz saxophonist Billy Harper recorded in 1975 for the Italian Black Saint label. The album was the first release for the record label.

== Reception ==
The Allmusic review by Glenn Astarita awarded the album 4½ stars calling it "one of the finest modern jazz releases of the '70s... Vigorously recommended". The Penguin Guide to Jazz Recordings says it is “the album people associate with Harper, a strong, eclectic blend of blues, hard-edged rock patterns and the by now familiar preaching style.”

Professional ratings
Review scores
Source	Rating
Allmusic	4.5/5 stars
The Penguin Guide to Jazz Recordings	3.5/4 stars

== Track listing ==
All compositions by Billy Harper.

1. "Dance, Eternal Spirits, Dance!" – 6:52
2. "Croquet Ballet" – 13:02
3. "Call of the Wild and Peaceful Heart" – 21:22
- Recorded at Barclay Studios in Paris, France, on July 21 & 22, 1975

== Personnel ==
- Billy Harper – tenor saxophone, cowbell
- Virgil Jones – trumpet
- Joe Bonner – piano
- David Friesen – bass
- Malcolm Pinson – drums
