= Diedre Murray =

American cellist and composer

- Born: New York
- Genres: Jazz, classical
- Occupation: Musician
- Instrument: Cello
- Years active: 1970s–present

Diedre Murray is an American cellist and composer specializing in jazz and musical theater. She also works as a record producer and curator.

As a performer she has worked with Leroy Jenkins, Marvin "Hannibal" Peterson, Henry Threadgill, Muhal Richard Abrams, James Brown, Julius Hemphill, Fred Hopkins, Jason Kao Hwang, and Archie Shepp, in addition to leading her ensembles, and has appeared on over 50 recordings as a cellist, composer, arranger and/or producer.

A native of New York, Murray received a B.S. degree from Hunter College in ethnomusicology, and studied at the Manhattan School of Music.

== Career ==
Early composing for theater or music productions: a score for the inaugural concert at the Danny Kaye/Sylvia Fine Playhouse entitled "Five Minute Tango", performed by the Manhattan Brass Quintet; The Conversation for the Seattle-based New Performance Group at the Walker Art Center in Minnesota for the Music in Motion program; Flashes, a structured improvised collaboration with choreographer Blondell Cummings and musicians Jeanne Lee and Pauline Oliveros for the Firewall Festival 1993; and music for Helen Thorington's radio piece Dracula's Wives for broadcast: a tour of Flashes to the Taklos Festival in Switzerland; and, a dramatized version of Unending Pain, with text by Laurie Carlos, at P.S. 122 in New York City. Her work as a composer was intermixed with an extensive concert schedule as a band leader and concert soloist.

Ms. Murray was also a curator of music programs in the 1990's and early 2000's. She curated programing for the Jamaica Arts Center, Jazz at St. Mary's, P.S. 122 and the 53rd Street Y. She is the co-creator (along with Craig Harris) of the Firewall Festival, produced by P.S. 122, which played in New York City and Philadelphia.

In 1996 her composing projects included: You Don't Miss Your Water, a music-theater piece, in collaboration with poet Cornelius Eady produced by the Music Theatre Group; the premiere of Women in the Dunes, a dance piece created by Blondell Cummings for the Japan Society and Mu Lan-Pi, her dance theatrescape commissioned by District Curators and performed in Washington, D.C. by the Ajax Moving Dance Company. In 1998 Murray developed the jazz opera The Running Man, for which she wrote the original story, score, and book with collaborators Cornelius Eady and Diane Paulus. Murray also conceived Songbird: The Life and Times of Ella Fitzgerald, for which she wrote the original music. She received a grant from the Commissioning Project to write Eleven Elements of Joy for orchestra, which debuted in June 1999.

In 2000 she wrote a chamber and choral piece for the Commissioning Project. In 2001 she wrote arrangements for the musical Eli's Coming, for which she won her second Obie. In 2002 she composed the score for Brutal Imagination, a verse play by Cornelius Eady. Other works include Strings Attached, a dance piece by choreographer Risa Jaroslow; Best of Both Worlds created by Randy Weiner and Diane Paulus; and a collaboration with Sonoko Kawahara on Name of the Flower, a music-theater piece; The Iliad and The Odyssey produced by Music Theater Group and Kathryn Walker. Murray collaborated with Paulus on the musical The Best of Both Worlds. Other projects include a collaboration with Carl Hancock Rux on The Blackamoor Angel, a full-length opera, a collaboration with Lynn Nottage on the musical Sweet Billy and the Zooloos; The Voice Within, an a cappella theater piece for ten voices with text by Marcus Gardley, at Aaron Davis Hall during a yearlong residency at Harlem Stages. She adapted the music for Tony Award winning production of The Gershwin's Porgy and Bess, directed by Diane Paulus in 2012 which played at the Richard Rodgers Theater. In 2019 she collaborated with Regina Taylor on two productions, "Crowns", produced by The Long Wharf and McCarter Theaters, and "Oo Bla Dee" produced by Three Rivers Theater.

Recent projects include working with Deborah Brevoort on "Loving", a musical based on the ground breaking relationship of Richard and Mildred Loving; scoring Chesney Snow's The Soil Beneath, a streamed choreopoem produced by Primary Stages; writing the score for Patient Zero, an opera, libretto by Cornelius Eady and Ms. Murray for Music Theater Group; composing music for an Opera on Tap production slated for December 2021; new music for a dance production by choreographer Dianne McIntyre, a retrospective of Ms. McIntyre's career; composing the soundtrack for "An Apology", based on the book written by V, formerly known as Eve Ensler.

== Awards ==
- Obie Award, The Running Man, 1999
- Pulitzer Prize Finalist for Drama, The Running Man, 1999
- Obie Award, Eli's Comin', 2002
- The Lilly's Composer Award, 2015

== Partial Discography ==
=== As leader or co-leader ===
- 1992 Firestorm (Victo)
- 1994 Stringology with Fred Hopkins (Black Saint)
- 1998 Prophecy with Fred Hopkins (About Time)

=== As sidewoman ===
With Leroy Jenkins and The Jazz Composer's Orchestra

- For Players Only (1975)

With Muhal Richard Abrams

- The Hearinga Suite (1989)

With Marvin "Hannibal" Peterson

- Children of the Fire (1973)
- Hannibal (1975)
- Hannibal in Berlin (1976)
- Hannibal Live in Antibes (1977)
- Hannibal Live in Berlin (1977
- Hannibal in Lausanne (1978)
- The Light (1978)
- Naima (1978)
- Tribute (1979)
- Children of Atlanta (1981)
- Visions of a New World (1989)

With Henry Threadgill

- Just the Facts and Pass the Bucket (1983)
- Subject to Change (1985)
- You Know the Number (1986)
- Easily Slip Into Another World (1987)
- Rag, Bush and All (1988)
