= Billy Harper =

American jazz saxophonist (born 1943)

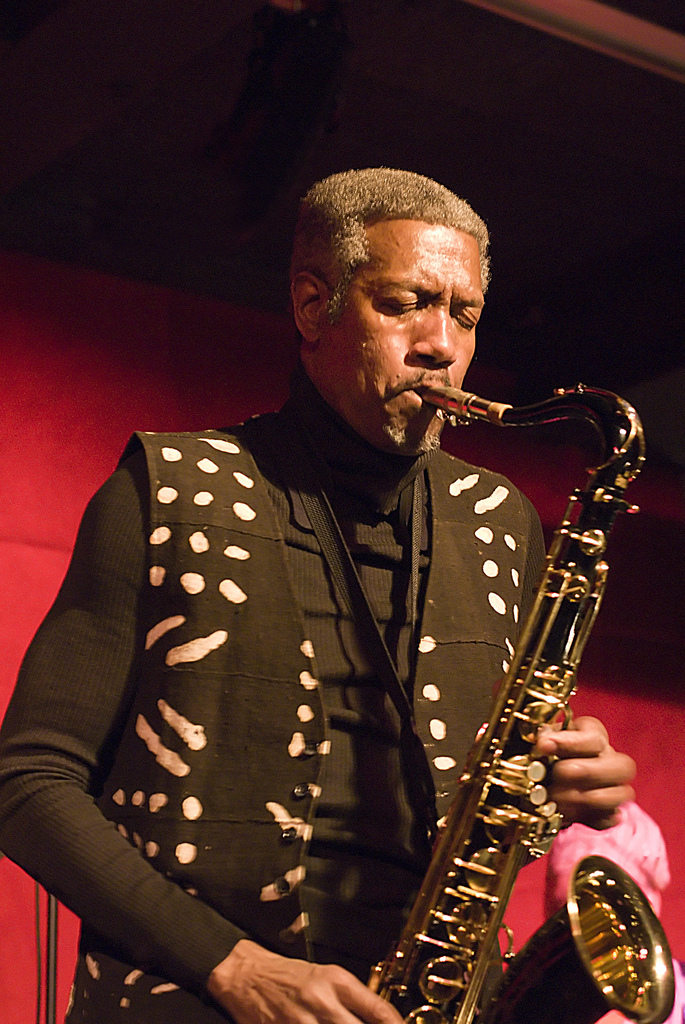
- Billy Harper at the Jazz Standard in 2007

Background information
- Born: January 17, 1943 (age 83); Houston, Texas, U.S.
- Genre: Jazz
- Occupations: Musician, Composer, Educator
- Instruments: Saxophone, Drums
- Labels: Black Saint, Strata-East, SteepleChase, Evidence, Marge, Denon Jazz, Denon Records, Nippon Columbia Co. Ltd., Soul Note, MPS Records, Baystate, DIW, Metropolitan Records, Arkadia Jazz, Talking House Records, Mosaic Records, Sunnyside, Blue Note, Verve, RCA, Enja, LyHarp Music
- Website: https://billyharpermusic.com

Billy Harper (born January 17, 1943) is an American jazz saxophonist, "one of a generation of Coltrane-influenced tenor saxophonists" with a distinctively stern, hard-as-nails sound on his instrument.

== Biography ==
He was born in Houston, Texas, United States. In 1965, Harper earned a Bachelor of Music degree from the University of North Texas.

Harper has played with some of jazz's greatest drummers; he served with Art Blakey's Messengers for two years (1968–1970); he played very briefly with Elvin Jones (1970), he played with the Thad Jones/ Mel Lewis Orchestra in the 1970s, and was a member of Max Roach's quartet from 1971–1978. In 1979, Harper formed his own group, touring with it and documenting its music on the recording Billy Harper Quintet in Europe, and he was featured as a soloist on a 1983 recording, Such Great Friends, with virtuoso, visionary pianist and record producer Stanley Cowell. After a period of relative inactivity in the 1980s, Harper came back strong with another international tour, which ended with perhaps his most ambitious recording: the three-volume Live on Tour in the Far East (1991). In the new millennium, Harper's recording activity has been subdued and sporadic, though more recently he appeared as a regular member of pianist-jazz historian Randy Weston's ensembles. In 2013, they recorded their first album as a duo, entitled The Roots of the Blues.

A retrospective of Billy Harper's career would include the following among its highlights: The saxophonist performed on Gil Evans' 1973 album Svengali, and contributed two of the most-performed tunes in the band's repertoire: "Priestess" and "Thoroughbred". Harper's own 1973 album Capra Black "remains one of the seminal recordings of jazz's black consciousness movement – a profoundly spiritual effort that channels both the intellectual complexity of the avant garde as well as the emotional potency of gospel". The Italian jazz label Black Saint was launched with Harper's 1975 album, Black Saint. His later releases have mostly been on SteepleChase and Evidence Records.

== Discography ==
=== As leader/co-leader ===
- 1973: Capra Black (Strata-East, 1974)
- 1974: Jon & Billy with Jon Faddis (Trio, 1974)
- 1975: Black Saint (Billy Harper Quintet On Tour In Europe '75) (Black Saint, 1975)
- 1977: Love on the Sudan (Denon, 1977)
- 1977: Soran-Bushi, B.H. (Denon, 1978)
- 1978: Knowledge of Self (Denon, 1979)
- 1979: Billy Harper Quintet in Europe (Soul Note, 1979)
- 1979: The Awakening (Marge, 1979)
- 1979: Trying to Make Heaven My Home (Saba/MPS, 1979)
- 1980: The Believer (Baystate/RVC, 1980)
- 1980: Billy Harper Quintet (PolJazz, 1981) – live
- 1989: Destiny Is Yours (Steeplechase, 1990)
- 1991: Live on Tour in the Far East (Steeplechase, 1992) – live
- 1991: Live on Tour in the Far East Vol. 2 (Steeplechase, 1993) – live
- 1991: Live on Tour in the Far East Vol. 3 (Steeplechase, 1993) – live
- 1993: Somalia (Evidence, 1995)
- 1997: If Our Hearts Could Only See (DIW, 1998)
- 1999: Soul of an Angel (Metropolitan, 2000)
- 2006: Blueprints of Jazz Vol. 2 (Talking House, 2008)
- 2013: The Roots of the Blues with Randy Weston (Sunnyside, 2013)

In omnibus album

- V.A., Jazz Jamboree '80 (Polskie Nagrania Muza, 1980) – live

=== As a member ===
The Thad Jones/Mel Lewis Orchestra

- Consummation (Blue Note, 1970)
- Potpourri (Philadelphia International, 1974)
- Suite for Pops (Horizon/A&M, 1975)

=== As sideman ===
With Art Blakey

- Live! Vol. 1 (Trip, 1974) – live rec. 1968
- Moanin' (Sarpe, 1990) – live rec. 1968

With Charles Earland

- Intensity (Prestige, 1972)
- Charles III (Prestige, 1973) – rec. 1972–1973

With Gil Evans

- Svengali (Atlantic, 1973)
- The Gil Evans Orchestra Plays the Music of Jimi Hendrix (RCA, 1974)
- There Comes a Time (RCA, 1976) – rec. 1975
- Blues in Orbit (Enja, 1980) – rec. 1969–1971
- Where Flamingos Fly (Artists House, 1981) – rec. 1971

With Lee Morgan

- The Last Session (Blue Note, 1972) – rec. 1971
- We Remember You (Fresh Sound, 1991) – rec. 1972

With Max Roach

- Lift Every Voice and Sing (Atlantic, 1971)
- Live in Tokyo Vol. 1 (Denon, 1977)
- Live in Tokyo Vol. 2 (Denon, 1977)
- The Loadstar (Horo, 1977)
- Live in Amsterdam (Baystate/RVC, 1977)
- Confirmation (Fluid, 1978)

With Malachi Thompson

- 47th Street (Delmark, 1997)
- Freebop Now! (Delmark, 1998)
- Blue Jazz (Delmark, 2003)

With Charles Tolliver

- With Love (Mosaic/Blue Note, 2006)
- Emperor March: Live at the Blue Note (Half Note, 2009) – rec. 2008

With Randy Weston

- Tanjah (Polydor, 1973)
- Carnival (Freedom, 1974)
- The Spirits of Our Ancestors (Antilles/Verve, 1991)
- Saga (Verve, 1995)
- The Roots of the Blues (Sunnyside, 2013)

With others

- Louis Armstrong, Louis Armstrong and His Friends (Flying Dutchman/Amsterdam, 1970)
- Horacee Arnold, Tribe (Columbia, 1973)
- Joe Bonner, Angel Eyes (Muse, 1976)
- Stanley Cowell, Such Great Friends (Strata-East, 1983)
- Sonny Fortune, Great Friends (Black & Blue, 1986)
- Bobbi Humphrey, Flute-In (Blue Note, 1971)
- Mark Masters Jazz Orchestra, Priestess (Capri, 1990) – with Jimmy Knepper
- Barney McAll, Widening Circles (Extra Celestial Arts, 1998)
- Grachan Moncur III, Exploration (Capri, 2004)
- Woody Shaw, Love Dance (Muse, 1975)
- Leon Thomas, The Leon Thomas Album (Flying Dutchman, 1970)
- McCoy Tyner, Journey (Birdology, 1993)
- Piotr Wojtasik, Quest (Power Bros, 1996)
