= Denon Records =

Japanese audiophile record label

Denon Records was a Japanese audiophile record label owned by Denon and distributed by A&M Records from 1990 through 1992. This was a reissue program that included 390 jazz and classical music titles that were issued on compact disc.

== Artists ==
- Aerosmith
- Alesso
- András Adorján
- Archie Shepp
- Art Farmer
- Bob Berg
- Camerata Bern
- Count Basie Orchestra
- Czech Philharmonic
- Dave Burrell
- Eliane Elias
- Hélène Grimaud
- Huguette Dreyfus
- Kenny Barron
- Luis Conte
- Michel Dalberto
- Peter Erskine
- Randy Brecker
- Ryuichi Sakamoto
- Sadao Watanabe
- Steve Laury
- Tommy Flanagan
