= October 1969 =

Month of 1969

<<	October 1969					>>
Su	Mo	Tu	We	Th	Fr	Sa
			1	2	3	4
5	6	7	8	9	10	11
12	13	14	15	16	17	18
19	20	21	22	23	24	25
26	27	28	29	30	31

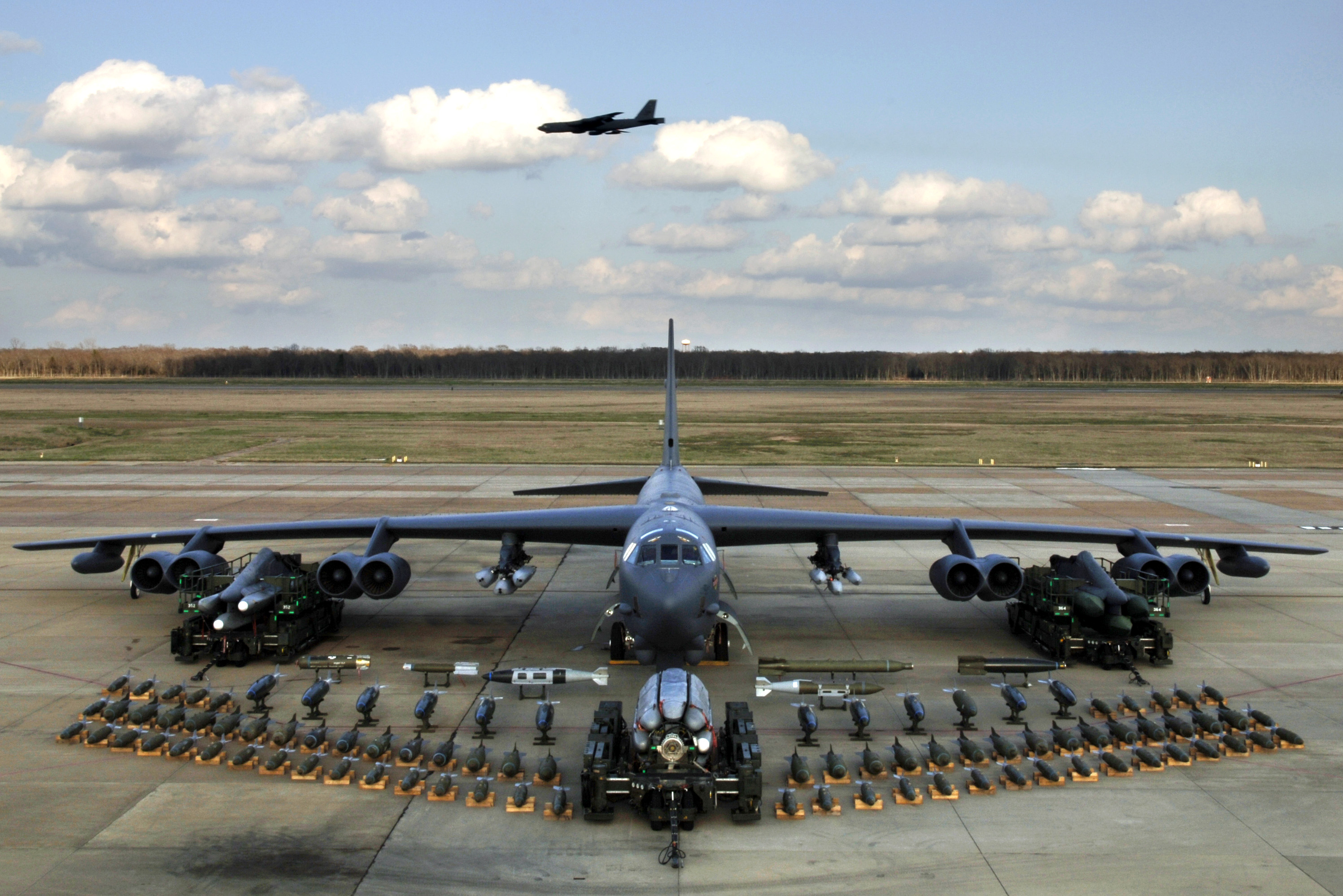
October 27, 1969: Nixon orders secret mission and 18 nuclear-armed American B-52 bombers fly toward USSR

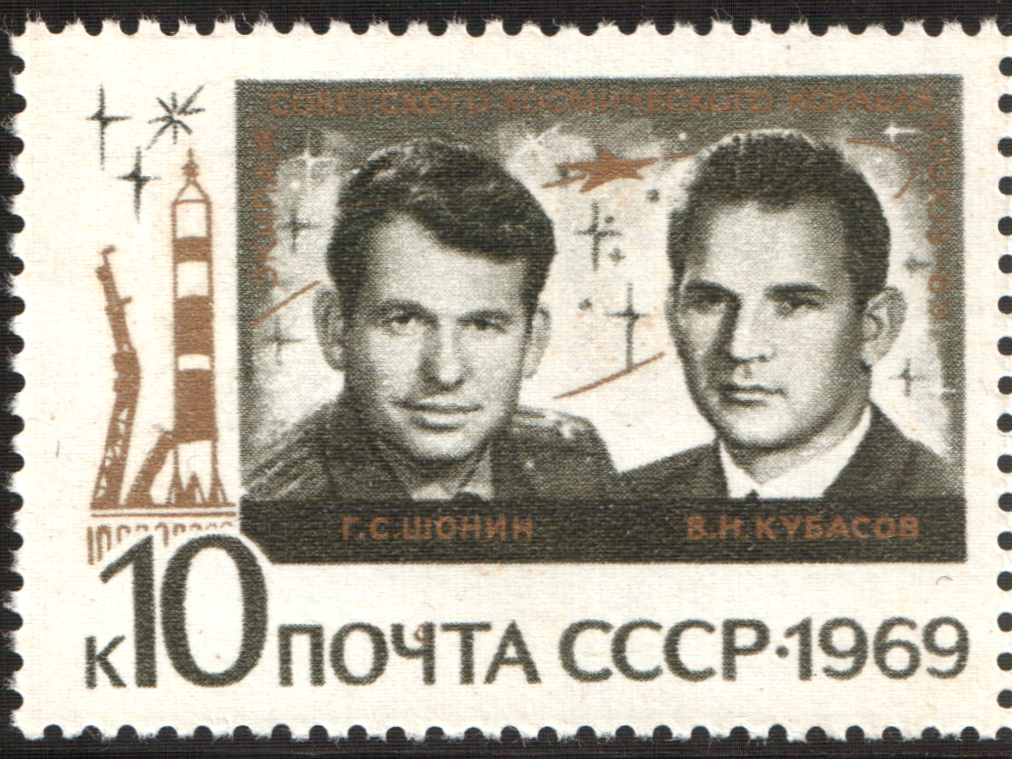
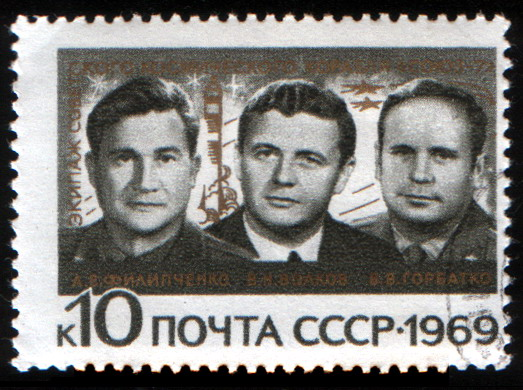
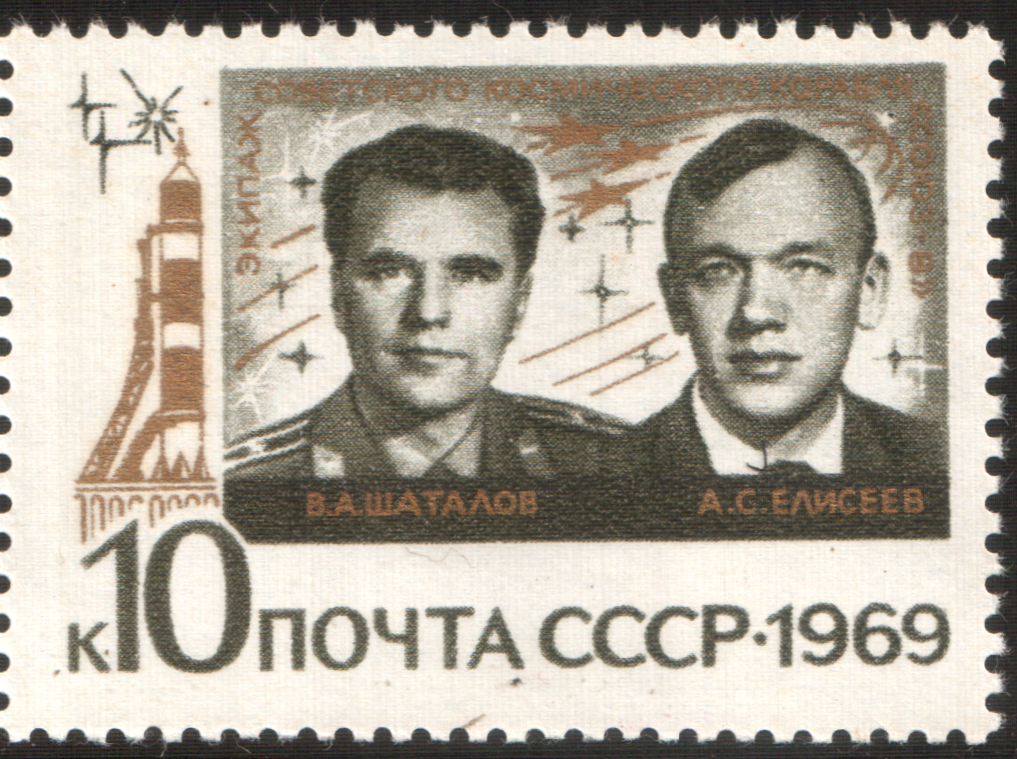
October 11–13, 1969: Cosmonauts Shonin and Valeri Kubasov (Soyuz 6); Volkov and Gorbatko (Soyuz 7); and Shatalov and Yeliseyev (Soyuz 8)

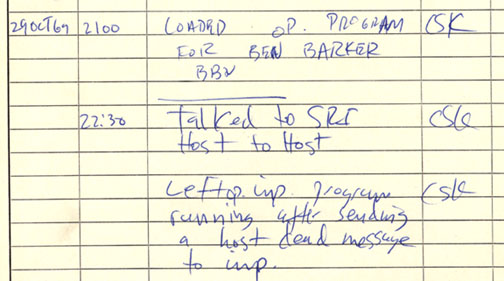
October 29, 1969: The first electronic message between two computers, "L-O", is sent from UCLA to Stanford

The following events occurred in October 1969:

== October 1, 1969 (Wednesday) ==
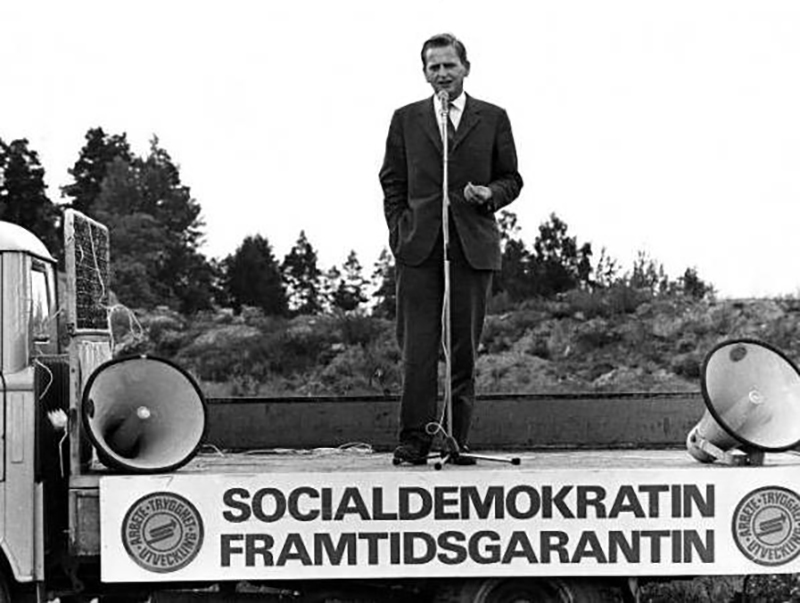
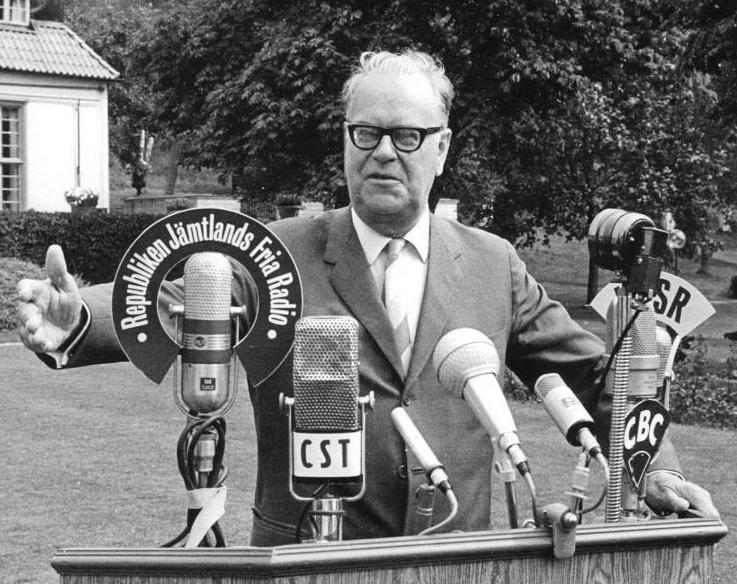
Prime Ministers Palme and Erlander
- Olof Palme was approved unanimously by the Riksdag to be the next Prime Minister of Sweden after Finance Minister Gunnar Sträng, a fellow member of Sweden's Social Democratic Workers Party (SAP), declined an attempt by conservative legislators to nominate a challenger to Palme. He would replace Tage Erlander as Prime Minister upon Erlander's retirement on October 14.
- The Beijing Subway began operation in a ceremony timed to coincide with the 20th anniversary of the founding of the People's Republic of China. The original line was 13 miles (21 km) long and ran from the Beijing central railway station to the People's Liberation Army base at Fushouling.
- Born:
  - Zach Galifianakis, American comedian; in Wilkesboro, North Carolina
  - Marcus Stephen, President of Nauru from 2007 to 2011

== October 2, 1969 (Thursday) ==
- A 1.2 megaton thermonuclear device was tested at Amchitka Island, Alaska. The test, codenamed Project Milrow, was a "calibration shot" to test if the island was fit for larger underground nuclear detonations.
- Born: Mitch English, American TV host; in Covington, Kentucky

== October 3, 1969 (Friday) ==
- Twenty-four of the 30 legislators of West Germany's Free Democrats party voted to join in a coalition government with the 224 members of Willy Brandt's Social Democratic Party, only one short of the 249 that would be necessary for Brandt to become Chancellor on the first ballot of voting in the new Bundestag that would take office on October 20. The Free Democrat Party decision meant that, for the first time in West Germany's 20-year history, the Christian Democrats would no longer lead the government.
- The member nations of the International Monetary Fund voted overwhelmingly to approve the implementation of a "new form of manmade international money", special drawing rights, referred to as "paper gold". Under the plan, the IMF would distribute $9.5 billion dollars of credit over a three-year period to IMF members "in proportion to their economic importance" in order to facilitate trade between nations without an actual transfer of their gold reserves.
- Born: Gwen Stefani, American singer and three-time Grammy Award winner, frontwoman of No Doubt; in Fullerton, California

== October 4, 1969 (Saturday) ==
- Diane Linkletter, the 21-year old daughter of popular TV show host Art Linkletter, died after falling or jumping from a window of her sixth floor apartment at the Shoreham Towers in West Hollywood. Diane had made regular appearances on her father's show during the 1968–69 season. The elder Linkletter attributed the death to his daughter's use of the hallucinogenic drug LSD, and told reporters, "It wasn't suicide, because she wasn't herself. It was murder. She was murdered by the people who manufacture and sell LSD." He clarified in an interview with the Los Angeles Times that Diane was already "somewhat emotional and dramatic", that she had confided in him that she had experimented with LSD five months earlier and had a bad experience, and that she apparently had taken the drug again hours before calling a friend and her brother to say that she was terrified. The tragedy would become part of an urban legend that, during the LSD trip, Diane had jumped because she "believed she could fly", and would be cited in debates over stricter controls over illicit drugs.
- Major League Baseball's first divisional playoffs began as the Minnesota Twins visited the Baltimore Orioles and the New York Mets visited the Atlanta Braves. The division of the National League and the American League into Eastern and Western Divisions was new for 1969. Previously, the AL's Orioles (109–53 record) and the NL's Mets (100–62) would have been the pennant winners without need for a playoff. Opening the best 3 games of 5 series, the Orioles won, 4–3, and the Mets 9–5.
- Died: Natalino Otto, 56, Italian big band leader, died after his second heart attack in two weeks.

== October 5, 1969 (Sunday) ==
- The groundbreaking British comedy Monty Python's Flying Circus first aired, appearing on BBC One at 10:55 at night. The first show was described in the news as "Latest late-night show which will, we are warned, be 'nutty'."
- The Japanese TV manga program Sazae-san, certified by Guinness World Records as the world's longest-running animated television series "Guinness Certifies Sazae-san as Longest Running Animated Show – News". Anime News Network. 2013-09-05. premiered on Fuji Television. As of 2024, Sazae-san had been on the air for 55 years.

== October 6, 1969 (Monday) ==
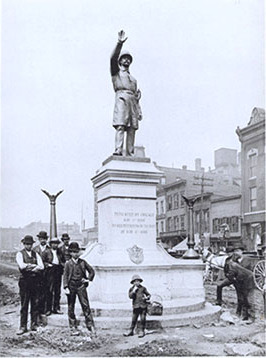
The Haymarket Memorial

- In Chicago, a time bomb placed by the American anarchist organization Weather Underground, destroyed a statue that had been erected to commemorate the victims of the Haymarket Bombing that killed seven Chicago policemen on May 4, 1886. The statue of a 19th century policeman, located at the time on Randolph Street near the Kennedy Expressway, was broken in half by the blast and toppled from its pedestal. The 1969 bombing was the first of several blasts that would be carried out by the "Weathermen" against American governmental buildings, and was the opener of the "Days of Rage" that coincided with the trial of the "Chicago Seven", who were on trial for conspiracy to incite a riot during the Democratic National Convention in 1968. Nobody was injured, and the statue would be rebuilt, only to be bombed again on October 6, 1970.
- The Baltimore Orioles and the New York Mets clinched the championships of the American League and the National League, respectively, by winning the third games of their best-of-5 series. Both games were played in the afternoon, with the NL series starting at 1:00 in New York, and the AL series beginning 90 minutes later in Minnesota. The Mets beat the Atlanta Braves, 7–4, and the Orioles beat the Minnesota Twins, 11–2, to qualify both teams for the 1969 World Series, set to begin on October 11.
- Born:
  - Muhammad V of Kelantan, Sultan of Kelantan since 2010 and Malaysia's Head of State (the Yang di-Pertuan Agong) from 2016 to his abdication in 2019; in Kota Bharu
  - Ogün Temizkanoğlu, Turkish soccer football defender and national team member; in Hamm, West Germany
- Died: Walter Hagen, 76, American professional golfer who won the PGA Championship five times and the British Open four times during the 1920s, as well as the U.S. Open twice (in 1914 and 1919).

== October 7, 1969 (Tuesday) ==
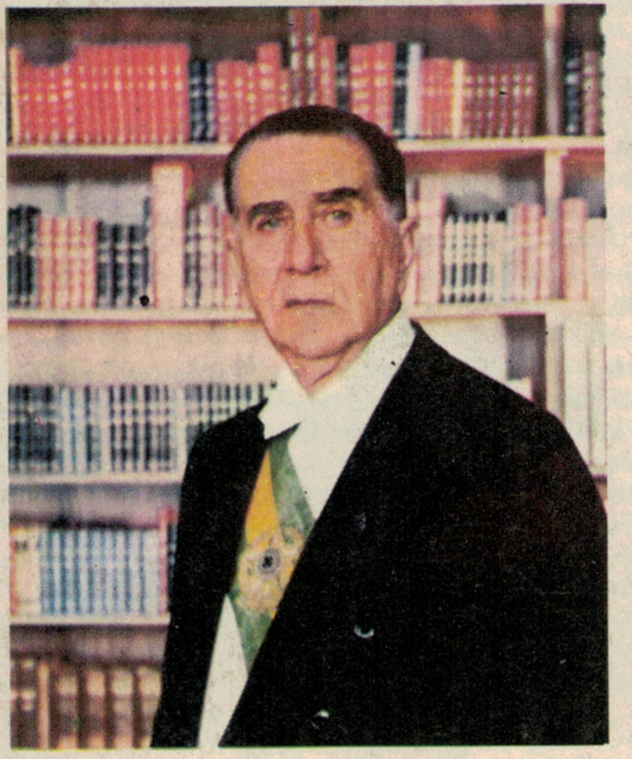
Medici

- A three-member military junta, that had governed Brazil since August 31, selected Army General Emílio Médici as the nation's new President. The three ministers of Brazil's Army, Navy and Air Force (Aurélio Tavares, Augusto Grünewald and Márcio Melo, respectively) had governed the country since August 31 after President Artur da Costa e Silva had suffered a stroke. Medici would be sworn in on October 30 after Brazil's Congress was called back into session to give official approval to the appointment and to approve 58 amendments to the national constitution to legalize the military junta's actions.
- Born: DJ Qbert (stage name for Richard Quitevis), American turntable DJ and composer; in San Francisco
- Died: Natalya Lisenko, 85, Russian-born French actress and wife of Ivan Mosjoukine

== October 8, 1969 (Wednesday) ==
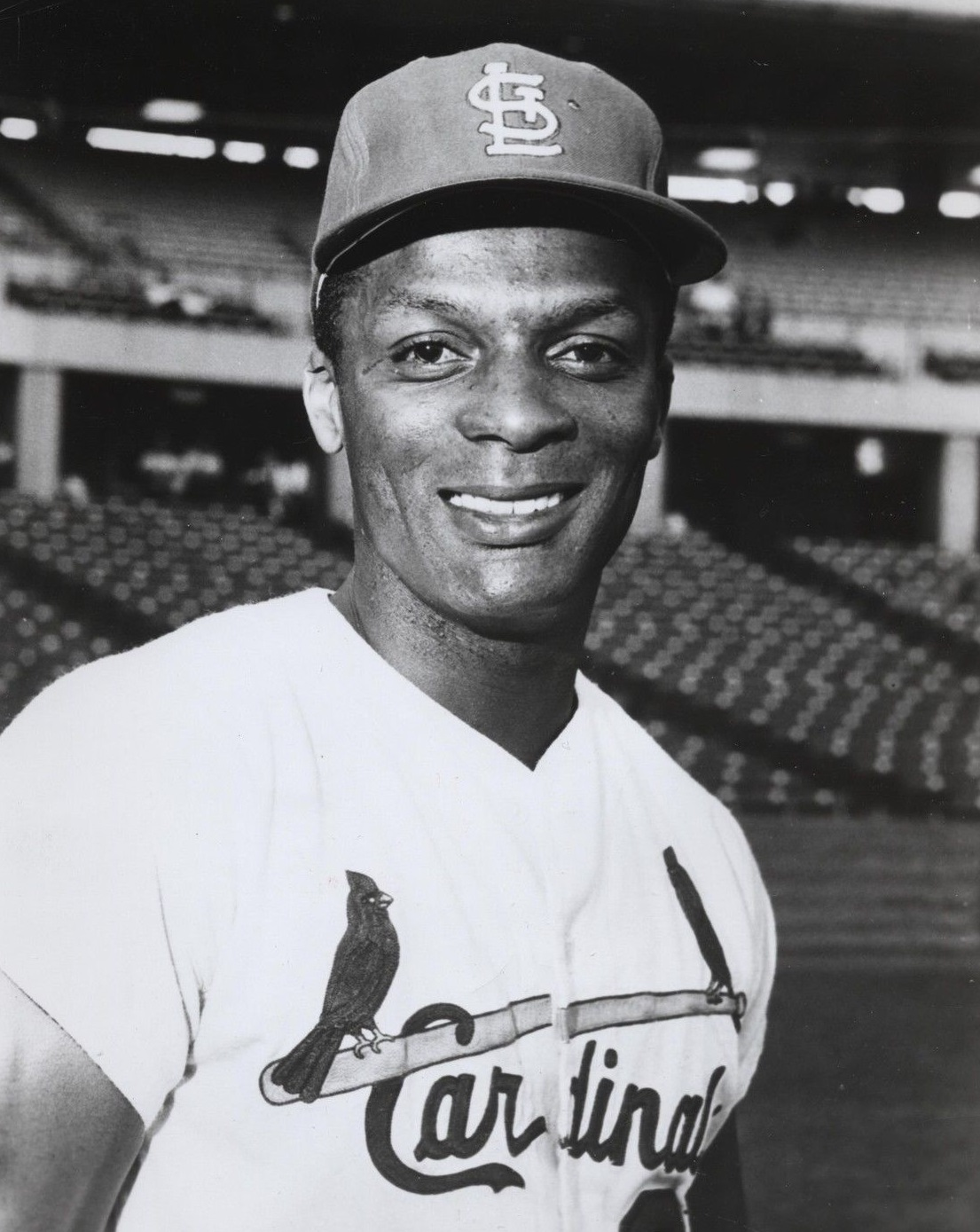
Flood

- The rights to employ St. Louis Cardinals center fielder Curt Flood were traded to the Philadelphia Phillies as part of an exchange involving seven players. Flood, however, didn't want to leave St. Louis, where he had built a profitable business as a portrait painter. He announced first that he intended to retire from baseball but soon became the first player to challenge the nearly century long practice of teams trading players without the players' consent. Before the 1970 season was to begin, Flood would file an antitrust lawsuit that, while ultimately unsuccessful, would lead the way for the players to strike successfully for the right to free agency.
- The first public protests by the radical American Weather Underground organization began with the "Days of Rage" in Chicago, timed to coincide with the "Chicago Seven" trial of defendants people charged with inciting violence during the Democratic National Convention in 1968. The Illinois National Guard was called in the next day to control the violence. Shortly after 10:30 p.m., a speaker at Chicago's Lincoln Park told 600 assembled demonstrators to "tear down the Drake Hotel" and to "get" Judge Julius Hoffman, who was presiding over the federal trial.

== October 9, 1969 (Thursday) ==
China and the Soviet Union
- The People's Republic of China announced that it would renounce further claims to territory that had been ceded to Russia during the past three centuries, including in the Treaty of Nerchinsk signed on August 27, 1689, between the Chinese Empire and the Russian Empire. "China does not demand the return of Chinese territory which Tsarist Russia annexed by means of unequal treaties," the government said in a 4,500-word statement, and added that the only request that it had was for the Soviets to concede that the treaties had been unfair. The declaration also brought an immediate end to the border wars that had been going on since March, with a return to the status quo by withdrawal of both nations' troops from each other's territory.
- The USSR made a partial change in its economic policy to allow employers the option to pay some workers more than others based on production. The move, which one British newspaper commented was "in effect, based on the capitalist policy of higher wages for better workers" and to allow managers to fire inefficient ones, was approved by the Central Committee of the Soviet Communist Party following the recommendations of Soviet Premier Alexei Kosygin.
- Born:
  - Steve McQueen, British film director and Oscar winner for 12 Years a Slave; as Steven Rodney McQueen in London
  - Jun Akiyama, Japanese professional wrestler and President of All Japan Pro Wrestling; in Izumi, Osaka Prefecture
  - PJ Harvey, British singer and musician; in Bridport
- Died: Don Hoak, 41, former third baseman of baseball's Pittsburgh Pirates died of a heart attack shortly after not being named the Pirates new manager, a job that he wanted to have. Hoak collapsed while driving his car, after giving chase to three young men who had stolen his brother-in-law's automobile.

== October 10, 1969 (Friday) ==
- On the advice of National Security Adviser Henry Kissinger, U.S. President Richard Nixon issued secret orders to the Joint Chiefs of Staff to commence "Operation Giant Lance", the sending of bombers armed with nuclear weapons toward Moscow in an effort to convince the Soviet leaders that he was not reluctant to launch a nuclear war in an effort to end the ongoing Vietnam War. A squadron of 18 B-52 bombers, each carrying nuclear bombs, would be sent out on October 27. "The mission was so secretive", a historian would write in 2008 after the orders had been declassified, "that even senior military officers following the orders — including the SAC commander himself — were not informed of its true purpose." The cable from General Earle Wheeler, the JCS Chairman, to eight commanders, began with the words "We have been directed by higher authority to institute a series of actions during the period 130000Z — 250000Z Oct, to test our military readiness in selected areas world-wide to respond to possible confrontation by the Soviet Union."
- The city of Simi Valley, California, came into existence three weeks after voters in the Ventura County communities of Simi Valley and Santa Susana voted, 6,454 to 3,685 to incorporate.
- The town of McLendon-Chisholm, Texas, was incorporated by voters in two neighboring rural settlements in Rockwall County, Texas.
- In the Court of the Crimson King, the debut album of King Crimson, is released.
- Born:
  - Brett Favre, American NFL quarterback and Pro Football Hall of Famer, three time NFL Most Valuable Player for three consecutive years (1995, 1996 and 1999); in Gulfport, Mississippi
  - Loren Bouchard, American television producer who created the animated sitcom Bob's Burgers; in New York City
  - Wendi McLendon-Covey, American film and television comedian; in Bellflower, California

== October 11, 1969 (Saturday) ==
- The Soviet Union launched Soyuz 6 into orbit with two cosmonauts, Georgy Shonin and Valery Kubasov, as the first step in building a permanent orbital space station.
- The Zodiac Killer claimed his seventh, and final victim, shooting San Francisco taxicab driver Paul Stine to death. Soon afterward, the killer mailed a piece of Stine's shirt to the San Francisco Chronicle and, as in previous letters to the Chronicle, claimed responsibility for the other murders.

== October 12, 1969 (Sunday) ==
- Anti-war protesters invaded a U.S. Army base for the first time, as an estimated 5,000 anti-war demonstrators crossed into the boundaries of the base at Fort Dix, New Jersey. The group was driven back by about 1,000 military policemen with tear gas, and there were no arrests and no injuries.
- Soyuz 7, the Soviet Union's first three-man spacecraft, was launched the day after Soyuz 6 had been sent up. The cosmonauts sent aloft were Anatoly Filipchenko, Vladislav Volkov and Viktor Gorbatko.
- Voting was conducted in Turkey for the 450-member Grand National Assembly, as Prime Minister Suleyman Demirel and his Justice Party continued their control of the government.
- Richard Fitzgerald, 26, fell 75 feet (23 m) to his death while climbing Huntington Ravine on Mount Washington. Fitzgerald's hiking partner survived.
- Born: Judit Mascó, Spanish Catalan model and TV host; in Barcelona

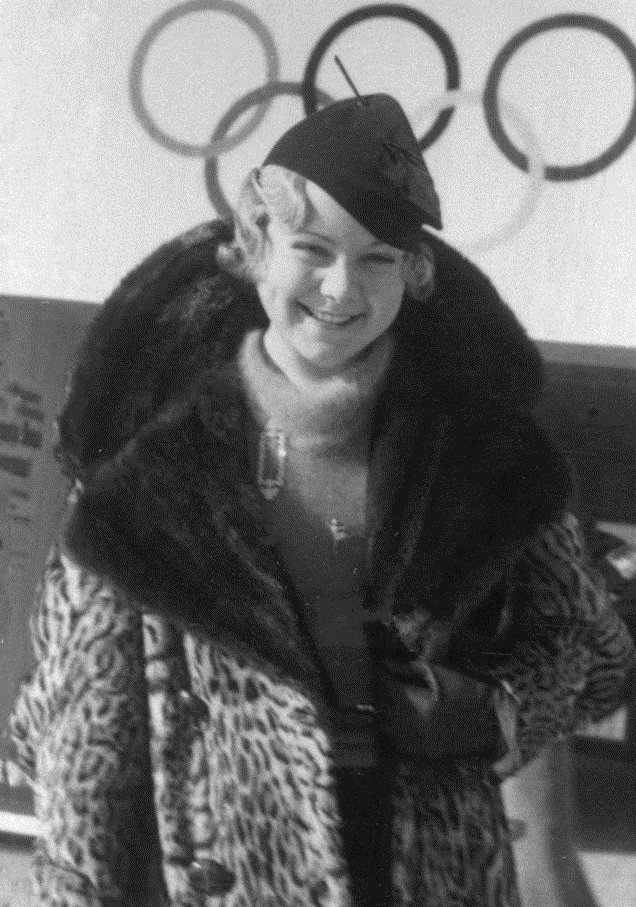
Sonja at the 1936 Olympics

- Died: Sonja Henie, 57, Norwegian Olympic figure skating champion and actress, died from complications of leukemia while flying home to Oslo.

== October 13, 1969 (Monday) ==
- For the third day in a row, the USSR launched men into space as Vladimir Shatalov and Aleksei Yeliseyev were sent up on Soyuz 8. In addition to marking the first time that seven people had been in space at the same time, the mission of Soyuz 6, 7 and 8 became clear with the apparent plan for the three spacecraft to be linked up to form the first long-term space station to orbit the Earth. On October 16, Soyuz 6 returned to Earth, followed the next day by Soyuz 7 and Soyuz 8 after the failure of the mission.
- Twenty-four of the 56 people on board Aeroflot Flight 227 were killed when the Antonov An-24B plane crashed while approaching Nizhnevartovsk on a flight from Surgut in the Russian SFSR.
- Born:
  - Nancy Kerrigan, American Olympic figure skater; in Stoneham, Massachusetts
  - Cady McClain, American soap opera actress; in Burbank, California
  - Rhett Akins, American country music singer; in Valdosta, Georgia
- Died: Fred Kohlmar, 64, American film producer, died from complications following lung surgery.

== October 14, 1969 (Tuesday) ==
- In one of the first major acts of in the United States of the animal rights movement, activists broke into the Bio-Research Institute in Cambridge, Massachusetts and released 3,000 hamsters that had been used in disease research. A spokesman for the Institute said that the act had ruined years of research into medical problems, in that none of the hamsters could be matched up with their testing records.
- Born: David Strickland, American TV actor; in Glen Cove, New York (committed suicide, 1999)
- Died:
  - Arnie Herber, 59, American NFL quarterback and Pro Football Hall of Famer, died of cancer.
  - August Sang, 55, Estonian Soviet poet

== October 15, 1969 (Wednesday) ==
- Hundreds of thousands of people took part in Moratorium to End the War in Vietnam demonstrations across the United States. Estimates of turnouts were 250,000 in Washington, D.C. and 100,000 in Boston on a regular workday. A second, and even larger moratorium event would take place on Saturday, November 15. The news media covering the event pointed out that although hundreds of thousands were involved millions of others were not and did not agree with the protesters, a sentiment echoed by U.S. President Nixon three weeks later when he coined the term "silent majority" in a nationally-televised speech.
- Abdirashid Ali Shermarke, the President of Somalia elected in 1967, was shot and killed by one of the policemen assigned to guard him during his visit to the Somali city of Las Anod. The murder, by Abdulkadir Abdi, took place one day before Shermarke's 50th birthday. Mukhtar Mohamed Hussein, the leader of the Somali National Assembly, assumed the role of acting president under the constitution. Hussein would serve for less than a week before being removed from office by a military coup.
- KBS Channel 9 (now DZKB-TV), the Philippines' sixth TV station, was launched.
- Died: Rod La Rocque, 70, American film actor

== October 16, 1969 (Thursday) ==
- The New York Mets won the World Series as they defeated the Baltimore Orioles in Game 5 of the World Series, 5 to 3, to complete one of the most memorable upsets in baseball history. The Mets had finished in last place in the National League in five of their first seven seasons from 1962 to 1968, and had ended 1968 ninth out of 10 teams.
- Born: Wendy Wilson, American singer and television personality; in Los Angeles, as the second daughter to Beach Boys singer Brian Wilson
- Died: Leonard Chess, 52, Polish-American record company executive and the co-founder of Chess Records, died of a heart attack.

== October 17, 1969 (Friday) ==
- Fourteen black members of the undefeated University of Wyoming Cowboys football team were kicked off the squad by head coach Lloyd Eaton when they came to talk to him at his office while wearing black armbands. The players had come in to talk to the coach at his Laramie, Wyoming office, about wearing the armbands as a protest during the next day's game against the all-white and all-Mormon Brigham Young University (BYU) team. Accounts of what happened next differ, but all 14 (including five starters), were barred from playing again during the argument that followed. A lawsuit by the players against Coach Eaton and the University would later be dismissed. As for the Wyoming Cowboys, they beat BYU the next day without the 14 players, and another team the following week, they would lose their final four games. Eaton would quit at the end of the 1970 season after the Cowboys finished at 1–9–0. Two of the players, Tony McGee and Joe Williams, would go on to careers in the NFL.
- Police in La Paz, Bolivia, seized the offices of the Gulf Oil Corporation. Later in the day, a spokesman for Bolivia's military junta announced the nationalization of Compania Bolivia Gulf, a subsidiary of the American oil producer.
- Born:
  - Ernie Els, South African professional golfer, two time U.S. Open and British Open winner; in Johannesburg
  - Wyclef Jean, Haitian-born rapper and Grammy Award winner; as Nel Ust Wyclef Jean in Croix-des-Bouquets
  - Wood Harris (Sherwin David Harris), American actor; in Chicago
  - Jesús Ángel García, Spanish race walker; in Madrid

== October 18, 1969 (Saturday) ==
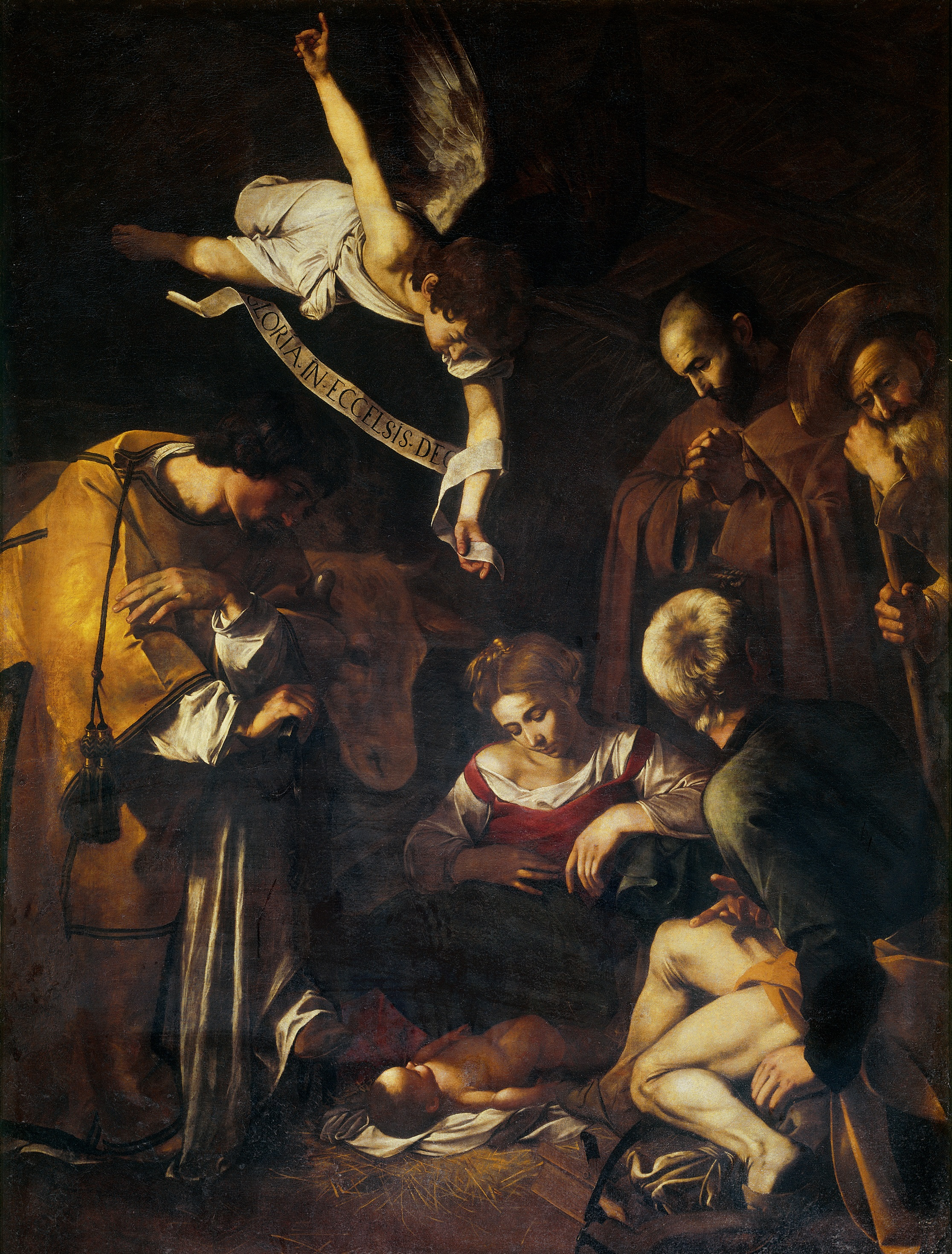
Caravaggio's Nativity

- Nativity with St. Francis and St. Lawrence, painted in the spring of 1600 by Milanese artist Michelangelo Amerighi da Caravaggio, was stolen from the Oratorio di San Lorenzo in Palermo. Worth an estimated $20,000,000 now, the painting has never been recovered in the 55 years since its disappearance.
- Robert H. Finch, Secretary of the U.S. Department of Health, Education and Welfare, announced a ban (effective January 1, 1970) on the use by food and beverage makers of the artificial sweetener sodium cyclamate, more commonly referred to as "cyclamates". After meeting with Finch, a representative of the 12 leading American soft drink manufacturers announced that the makers of sugar-free colas and other beverages would "immediately suspend production of low calorie soft drinks" containing cyclamates (which were more costly than saccharin) and that the companies would "turn their efforts to developing or reformulating other products... so that low calorie products can again be offered for consumption to those people who wish to make that choice." The drinks already bottled or canned could still be shipped to local distributors and retail outlets for the remainder of the year.
- The agreement to create the Caribbean Development Bank was signed in Kingston, Jamaica, by representatives of 16 nations, along with the United Kingdom and Canada. The agreement entered into force three months later, on January 26, after 15 of the 18 nations had ratified the pact.

== October 19, 1969 (Sunday) ==
- The morning after the state funeral and burial for assassinated Somalian President Shermarke, Somalian Army General Siad Barre led a bloodless coup d'etat. The broadcast on Radio Mogadishu, announcing the coup, included a statement that "the revolution was staged to save Somalia from the corrupt malpractices of the ruling classes" and pledged to abolish tribalism. General Barre and his Supreme Revolutionary Council would control the northeast African nation for more than 20 years until his overthrow by rebels on January 26, 1991.
- A landslide killed 18 children in the Mexican village of Tremenio de Los Reyes, located in the state of Michoacán about 35 miles (56 km) south of Morelia. The victims, ranging in age from 8 to 16 years old, had been part of a group of 60 student volunteers who were gathering sand for cement to help build a basketball court for the village church.
- Born: Trey Parker (Randolph Severn Parker III), American TV producer and co-creator of South Park; in Conifer, Colorado

== October 20, 1969 (Monday) ==
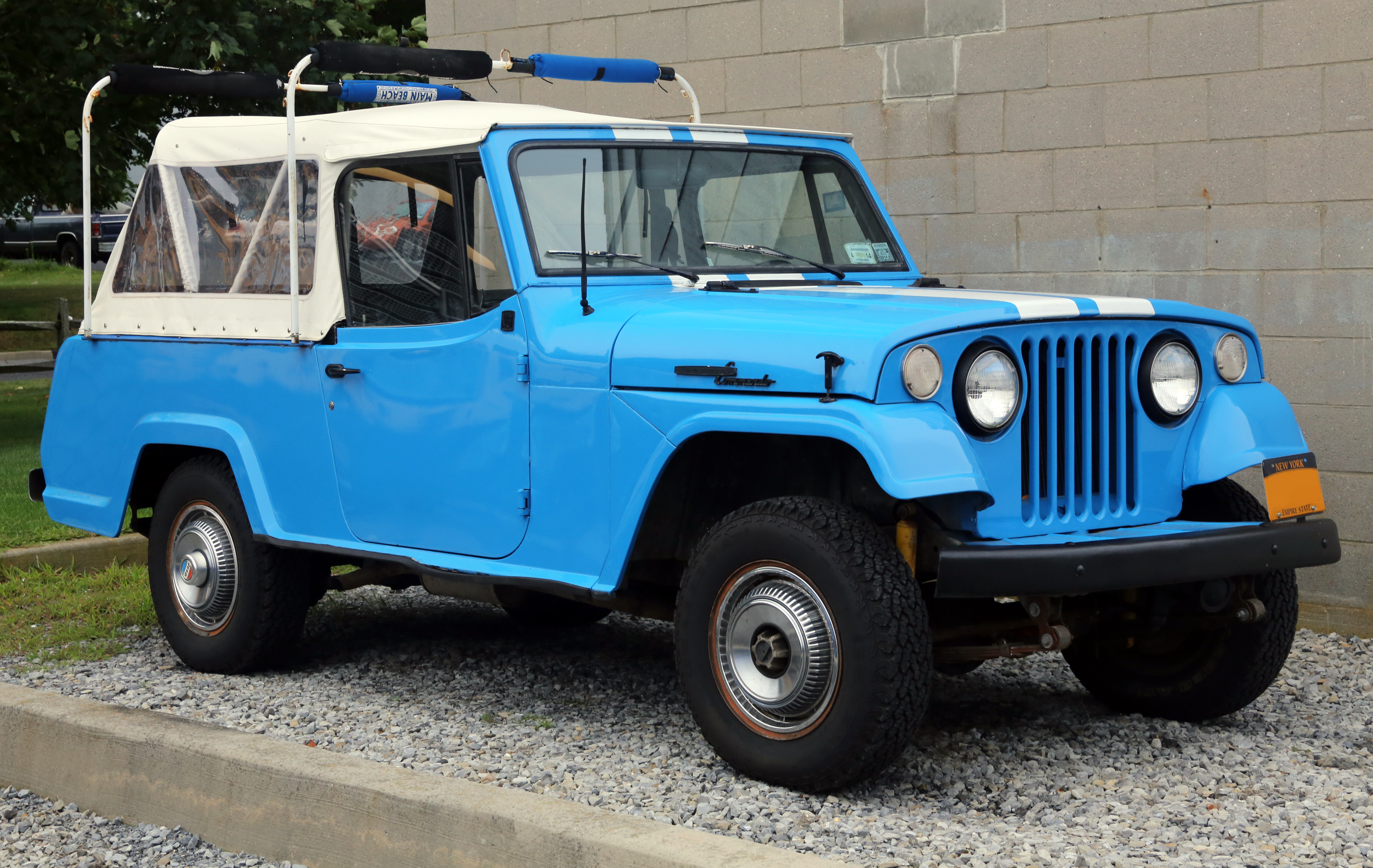
A 1969 Kaiser Jeep

- The fourth largest automaker in the United States, American Motors Corporation (AMC), announced its acquisition of the Kaiser Jeep Corporation, which had only manufactured the Jeep military and consumer vehicles since discontinuing its line of Kaiser-Frazer automobiles in 1963. The buyout, capitalized at $10 million in cash, $10 million in promissory notes due in 1974, and 5.5 million shares of AMC stock, brought an end to the Kaiser Company's 24-year existence.
- Experimental research showing that protons were composed of smaller particles, the first evidence of quarks, was published.
- Born:
  - Juan González, Puerto Rican American MLB outfielder with 434 home runs, American League MVP in 1992 and 1993; in Vega Baja, Puerto Rico"
  - Laurie Daley, Australian rugby league five-eighth back with 26 caps on the Australia national team; in Junee, New South Wales

== October 21, 1969 (Tuesday) ==
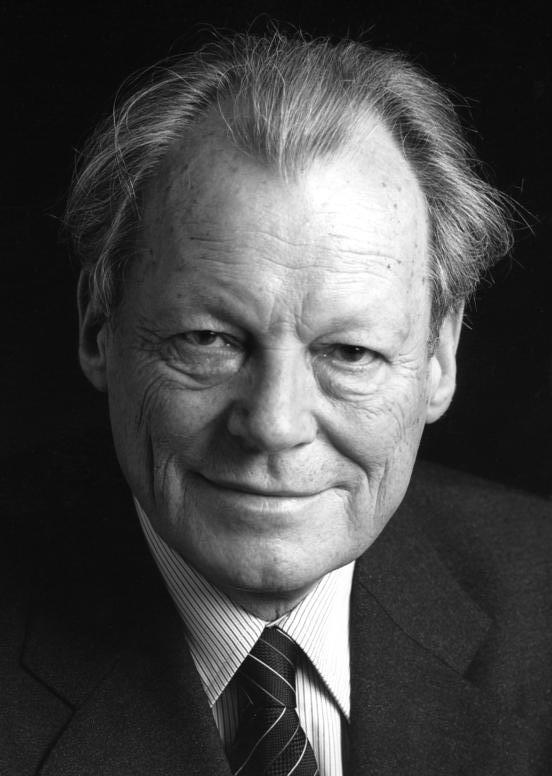
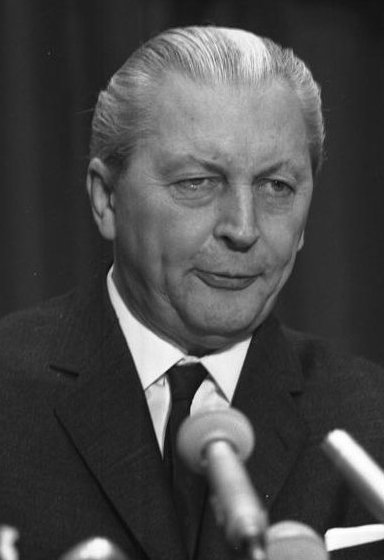
Brandt and Kiesinger
- Members of the Bundestag, West Germany's lower house of parliament, voted to elect Willy Brandt as the new Chancellor of West Germany, bringing an end to the government of Kurt Georg Kiesinger. All but three of the members of Brandt's coalition of 224 Social Democrats and 30 Free Democrats cast votes in favor of Brandt to form a government, giving him 251 of the 496 possible votes, two more than needed for a majority.
- Born: Michael Hancock, Australian rugby league wing; in Stanthorpe, Queensland
- Died:
  - Jack Kerouac, 47, American novelist who pioneered the "Beat Generation" with his classic 1957 novel On the Road died from an abdominal hemorrhage caused by cirrhosis.
  - Wacław Sierpiński, 87, Polish mathematician for whom the Sierpiński number and Sierpiński's constant are named

== October 22, 1969 (Wednesday) ==
- During a live broadcast on San Francisco's KGO-TV morning program The Jim Dunbar Show, a voice who confirmed to be the Zodiac Killer was heard for the first time. The voice, who later turned out wasn't the Zodiac, called in at least five times over a 90 minute period. Dunbar's guest was the famous criminal defense attorney, Melvin Belli, and the first call came at 7:10, as the caller threatened to commit more murders if he wasn't allowed to talk to Belli on the air.
- Lebanon's Prime Minister Rashid Karami resigned after a series of violent clashes between the Lebanese Army and Palestinian guerrillas, protests in the streets of Beirut, and threats by Iraq, Syria and Libya.
- Led Zeppelin released its second studio album, Led Zeppelin II, in the United States on Atlantic Records. Atlantic would release the album in the United Kingdom on October 31.
- Born: Spike Jonze (stage name for Adam Spiegel), American film director; in Rockville, Maryland

== October 23, 1969 (Thursday) ==
- Eight sailors on board the Canadian destroyer HMCS Kootenay were killed in an explosion at sea.
- Born:
  - Sanjay Gupta, American neurosurgeon, medical reporter and writer
  - Jon Huertas (stage name for Jonathan Hofstedt), American actor; in New York City

== October 24, 1969 (Friday) ==
- Convicted of espionage eight years earlier, American spies Morris Cohen and Lona Cohen, better known by their aliases as "Peter and Helen Kroger", were released from prison in Great Britain. Mr. Cohen had been serving a 20-year sentence at Parkhurst Prison on the Isle of Wight, while his wife had been held at Holloway Prison near London. They were reunited in London, then taken to Heathrow Airport and put on a British European Airways flight to Warsaw, from which they would then be taken to live in the Soviet Union.
- Paul McCartney of The Beatles appeared in public for the first time since the "Paul is dead" rumor that had been circulating for several weeks, bringing an end to the speculation that clues to his apparent accidental death had been included in backward messages within Beatles songs, and images on albums. Paraphrasing the late Mark Twain, McCartney told reporters, "Reports of my death have been greatly exaggerated."
- Born:
  - Arthur Rhodes, American baseball relief pitcher who played 20 seasons and exactly 900 regular season games in the major leagues for nine different teams, and 26 postseason games before retiring at age 41; in Waco, Texas
  - Adela Noriega, Mexican TV actress and star of multiple telenovelas; in Mexico City

== October 25, 1969 (Saturday) ==
- In elections for Australia's House of Representatives, Prime Minister John Gorton's coalition government of Liberal and Country Party members narrowly survived a challenge by the resurgent Australian Labor Party (ALP), led by Gough Whitlam. The Liberal Party lost 15 of its 61 seats in the 125-member House, while the ALP gained 18, giving it the plurality of seats (59 vs. 46 for the Gorton's party), still short of the required 63 seats for a majority. The coalition's lead over the conservative ALP dropped from a two-to-one (82 to 41) advantage to just seven seats (66 to 59). In the immediate aftermath of the election, Gorton would survive a challenge to the leadership of the Liberal Party made by his deputy, William McMahon, and by David Fairbairn, on November 7.
- Born:
  - Oleg Salenko, Soviet Russian soccer football striker; in Leningrad (now Saint Petersburg)
  - Samantha Bee, Canadian-American comedian known for Full Frontal with Samantha Bee and The Daily Show with Jon Stewart; in Toronto
  - Nika Futterman, American voice actress; in New York City

== October 26, 1969 (Sunday) ==
- In the first multiparty elections in almost 44 years in Portugal, the União Nacional won all 130 seats in the Assembly of the Republic, the European nation's unicameral parliament. Under the law at the time, there were 18 electoral districts and all the seats of a district were awarded to whichever party had the highest number of votes. Overall, the UN party, which had held all the seats since elections were resumed in 1934 from Estado Novo of dictator António de Oliveira Salazar, had 85% of the vote. The UN party would be dissolved after the overthrow of the government of Prime Minister Marcelo Caetano in 1974.

== October 27, 1969 (Monday) ==
- Unbeknownst to the general public, 18 American B-52 bombers, each loaded with nuclear weapons, took off from the United States and flew a polar route toward Moscow and the Soviet Union, as part of Operation Giant Lance. For three days, in maneuvers designed to attract the attention of the USSR and to test their intelligence capabilities, the bombers flew close to Soviet territory in what a historian would later describe as "the only moment we know of when a president decided that it made strategic sense to pretend to launch World War III." The operation was ended on October 30 by order of President Nixon.
- The Caribbean British colonies of Antigua and Barbuda, Dominica, Grenada, Saint Christopher and Nevis, Saint Lucia, and Saint Vincent and the Grenadines, comprising 31 inhabited islands, were allowed autonomy as the West Indies Associated States after 300 years of being governed by British colonial authorities.

== October 28, 1969 (Tuesday) ==
- In elections for Israel's Knesset, Prime Minister Golda Meir's Alignment of her Labor Party and Mapam lost seven seats, but retained a plurality, with control of 56 of the 120 Knesset seats.

== October 29, 1969 (Wednesday) ==
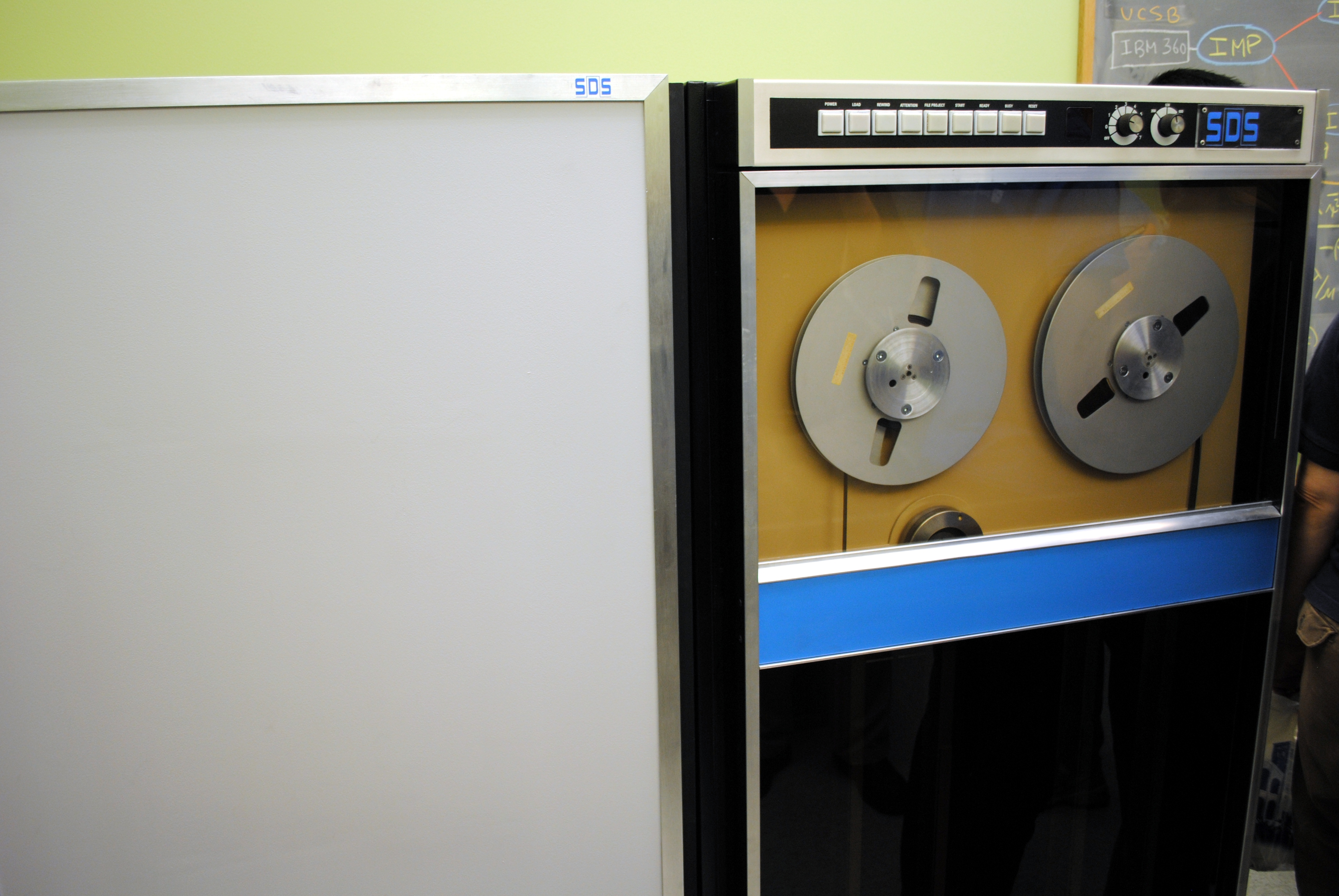
The UCLA Sigma 7

- At 10:30 in the evening at the University of California, Los Angeles (UCLA) campus, the first message was sent over ARPANET, the forerunner of the internet. Leonard Kleinrock would recall later that the first message, transmitted from UCLA to the computer at the Stanford Research Institute (SRI) was intended to be transmitting the letters "L-O-G", after which Stanford would add two more letters to send back the word "LOGIN". Charley Kline, a 21-year old UCLA student, attempted to send a message on the department's SDS Sigma 7 computer to a Sigma 7 at SRI. Kline sent the "L", then asked over the telephone whether it had been received, then sent the "O". Before UCLA could transmit the letter "G", the SRI computer crashed and, as Kleinrock would note later, "History now records how clever we were to send such a prophetic first message, namely 'Lo'".
- The United States Supreme Court ruled unanimously in Alexander v. Holmes County Board of Education that the last remaining school districts in the United States practicing de facto racial segregation could no longer delay submitting desegregation plans. In doing so, the Court referenced its 1955 amendment to its 1954 ruling in Brown v. Board of Education of Topeka, which had ordered that schools be desegregated "with all deliberate speed", declaring that 14 years had been long enough. "Continued operation of segregated schools under a standard of allowing 'all deliberate speed' for desegregation", the Court wrote, "is no longer constitutionally permissible." The Court ordered that the 30 districts that had continued to have separate schools for white and black students would have to submit plans by December 1.
- Died:
  - Paul Bailliart, 91, French ophthalmologist and designer of several measuring devices, including Bailliart's ophthalmodynamometer
  - Francisco Orlich Bolmarcich, 62, President of Costa Rica from 1962 to 1966

== October 30, 1969 (Thursday) ==
- The government of Kenya, at the direction of President Jomo Kenyatta, outlawed the African nation's only opposition political party, the Kenya People's Union (KPU). The action, taken a little more than a month before parliamentary elections scheduled for December 6, took place three days after the arrest of former Vice President Jaramogi Oginga Odinga and the other seven members of the National Assembly from the KPU. With no rivals on the ballot, the candidates from Kenyatta's party, the Kenya African National Union (KANU) would be elected to the 158 seats in the Assembly.
- General Emílio Garrastazu Médici was sworn in as the new President of Brazil, with Admiral Augusto Rademaker as vice president. A three-man military junta had governed the nation since August 30. The Brazilian National Congress also approved 58 amendments to the Brazilian constitution to enhance the power of the President and to limit the powers of the Congress, which was reduced from 409 to 280 members, and to legalize the death penalty for anyone charged and convicted in the military courts for subversion against the government.
- Future U.S. President Bill Clinton was reclassified from "1-S" to "1-A" by his local draft board, losing the deferment for college students, after reneging on a promise to enroll in the ROTC program at the University of Arkansas.
- Born:
  - Stanislav Gross, Prime Minister of the Czech Republic from 2004 to 2005; in Prague (died of ALS, 2015)
  - Snow (stage name for Darrin O'Brien), Canadian reggae artist; in Toronto
- Died: George "Pops" Foster, 77, American jazz musician

== October 31, 1969 (Friday) ==
- Sam Walton's chain of Walmart discount department stores was formally incorporated. Shares of stock in the company would first be offered to the public on October 1, 1970, originally at the price of $16.50 per share. In the first 47 years after the trade, there would be eleven different stock-splits so that one of the original shares of Walmart stock would be 2,048 by the end of 2016. With a price 49 years later of $100 per share, each original share of stock would now be worth $204,800.
- The disappearance of Patricia Spencer and Pamela Hobley happened in Oscoda, Michigan when the two teenage girls, aged 16 and 15 respectively, vanished after choosing to walk out of classes at Oscoda High School. The two were apparently picked up by their killers while hitchhiking, and were never seen again.
- Died: Carlos Alberto Arroyo del Río, 75, President of Ecuador from 1940 to 1944
