= November 1969 =

Month of 1969

<<	November 1969					>>
Su	Mo	Tu	We	Th	Fr	Sa
						1
2	3	4	5	6	7	8
9	10	11	12	13	14	15
16	17	18	19	20	21	22
23	24	25	26	27	28	29
30

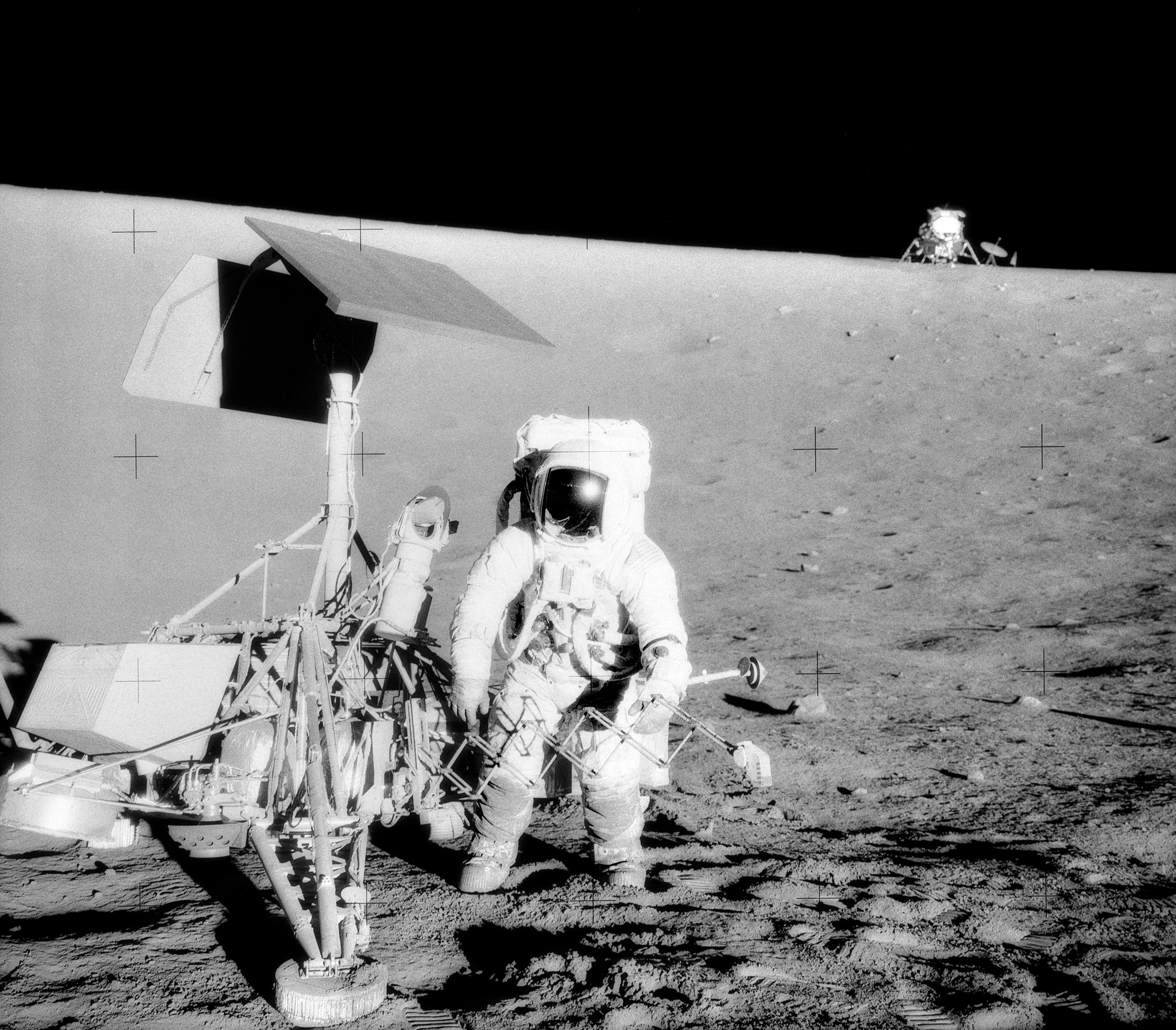
November 19, 1969: Alan Bean guides Apollo 12 module to within 200 yards of Surveyor 3 landing site

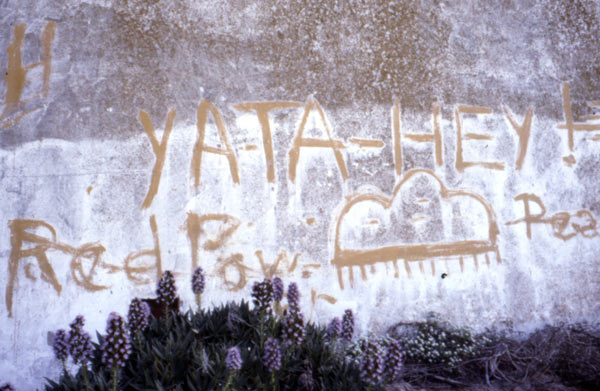
November 20, 1969: Ninety American Indians begin seizure of Alcatraz Island

The following events occurred in November 1969:

== November 1, 1969 (Saturday) ==
- TWA Flight 85 landed safely at Rome's Fiumicino Airport at 5:07 in the morning local time, 18 hours after it had been hijacked during a scheduled flight between two California cities. The Boeing 707 had departed Los Angeles for San Francisco when one of its passengers, Italian-born U.S. Marine Lance Corporal Raphael Minichiello, entered the cockpit with a carbine rifle and directed the six-member crew to travel eastward. With the crew held at gunpoint, Flight 85 had made stops in Denver; New York; Bangor, Maine; and Shannon, Ireland, before Minichiello landed in Rome and was transported out of the Italian capital by the chief of Rome's police, Pietro Guli. Minichiello then escaped into the Italian countryside, then made his way back to the city. Hours later, the native of Italy was captured by Rome police "who found him shivering in his underwear near the ancient Appian Way". Italian courts declined requests to extradite Minichiello and convicted him on a firearms charge, for which he served 18 months in prison. Afterwards, Minichiello, facing charges that carried a minimum sentence of 20 years in prison, remained in Italy.
- Died: Pauline Bush, 83, American silent film actress

== November 2, 1969 (Sunday) ==
- Elections were held in Tunisia for the 101-member Chamber of Deputies and for the presidency, and no choices were available to the reported 1,443,347 eligible citizens who participated. Habib Bourguiba, who had overthrown the monarchy in 1957, was unopposed and was re-elected to another five year term as President of Tunisia, and the legislators were from the only legal political organization in the North African nation, the Socialist Destourian Party.
- Born: Reginald "Fieldy" Arvizu, American musician, bassist for the metal band Korn; in Bakersfield, California

== November 3, 1969 (Monday) ==
- U.S. President Richard Nixon addressed the nation on television and radio at 9:30 p.m., Washington time, to announce his plans to end American involvement in the Vietnam War. Nixon gave his reasons for rejecting immediately removing all troops, framing that option as the "first defeat in our Nation's history" that "would result in a collapse of confidence in American leadership, not only in Asia but throughout the world." Nixon instead reiterated his plan for Vietnamization, "the complete withdrawal of all U.S. combat ground forces, and their replacement by South Vietnamese forces on an orderly scheduled timetable" but added that he did not intend to announce details of the timetable. In closing, he described the people who would support his plan for a drawdown as "the great silent majority of my fellow Americans", in contrast to a "vocal minority" of protesters which, if their will prevailed "over reason and the will of the majority", would mean that the United States would have "no future as a free society."

== November 4, 1969 (Tuesday) ==
- The Public Broadcasting Service (PBS) was incorporated in the United States.
- Born:
  - Tony Burke, Australian politician, Leader of the House (2022-present), in Sydney
  - Sean "Puff Daddy" Combs, American hip hop recording artist and three time Grammy winner; in New York City
  - Matthew McConaughey, American film and TV actor, 2014 Oscar winner; in Uvalde, Texas
- Died:
  - Frank G. Clement, 49, three time Governor of Tennessee; in an auto accident
  - Ikbal Ali Shah, 75, Indian-born British author; in an auto accident
  - Carlos Marighella, 57, Brazilian politician; from police ambush

== November 5, 1969 (Wednesday) ==
- Thirty-six crewmen on board the Liberian-registered oil tanker Keo were killed after the vessel was cut in half and sank about 120 miles (190 km) from Nantucket Island in Massachusetts. The Keo had departed Marion, Massachusetts with a cargo of 210,000 U.S. gallons (790,000 L; 170,000 imp gal) of fuel oil, en route to Bermuda, when it encountered a storm in the Atlantic Ocean. The U.S. Coast Guard was able to rescue all seven people from a sinking yacht in the same area.
- Three American prisoners of war walked into a South Vietnamese militia outpost near Tam Ky, a week after they had been freed from captivity by the Viet Cong. The three, all from the southeastern United States, had walked for a week through the jungle after being set free.
- Died: Lloyd Corrigan, 69, American film director

== November 6, 1969 (Thursday) ==
- At least 65 gold miners near Klerksdorp, South Africa, were killed by an underground dynamite explosion at the Buffelsfontein mine. The blast happened a few minutes before their shift had been scheduled to end, and about half an hour after their employer had lowered 11 cases of dynamite into the mine shaft where they were working. Most of the dead were black Africans from the neighboring kingdom of Lesotho.
- Died: Susan Taubes, 41, Hungarian-born American novelist; by suicide only a month after the release of her bestselling book Divorcing, by walking into the Atlantic Ocean after taking a taxi to the beach at East Hampton, New York.

== November 7, 1969 (Friday) ==
- Australia's Prime Minister, John Gorton, survived a challenge to his leadership of the Liberal Party, waged by two of his fellow MPs among the 66 Liberal Party members in the Australian House of Representatives. A win by either of the challengers, Treasurer and Deputy Party Leader William McMahon or National Development Minister David Fairbairn, would have removed Gorton from office as Prime Minister. The results of the vote were not made public, and the official report was only that Gorton had received at least 33 of the 66 votes on the first ballot, enough for a majority over his challengers.
- The first German orbiting satellite, AZUR, was launched from Vandenberg Air Force Base in California at 5:52 p.m. local time (2:52 a.m. Saturday Central European Time) and inserted into a polar orbit. The 72.6 kilograms (160 lb) spacecraft, made to study cosmic radiation, solar particles and the Van Allen belts, made West Germany the ninth nation to enter outer space, and would transmit data until June 29, 1970.
- Sister Catherine Cesnik, a Roman Catholic nun and schoolteacher in Baltimore, disappeared after leaving her apartment to go shopping in Catonsville, Maryland. Her abandoned car would be found a block away the next morning, but her body would not be located until January 3, 1970. The case, which remains unsolved, would be the subject 47 years later in a Netflix documentary television series, The Keepers.
- Born:
  - Hélène Grimaud, French classical pianist and conservationist; in Aix-en-Provence
  - Michelle Clunie, American TV actress; in Portland, Oregon

== November 8, 1969 (Saturday) ==
- Paul Roitsch of Pan American World Airways became the first commercial pilot to fly the supersonic Concorde airliner, although Pan Am would never add the Concorde to its fleet of aircraft.
- Died:
  - Dave O'Brien (stage name for David Fronabarger), 57, American film actor; from a heart attack during a yachting race
  - Ricardo Aguirre, 30, Venezuelan folk singer who popularized the gaita zuliana style of music; in an auto accident
  - Vesto Slipher, 93, American astronomer who discovered the redshift variation in measuring galactic data

== November 9, 1969 (Sunday) ==
- A group of American Indians, led by Richard Oakes, seized Alcatraz Island for 19 months, inspiring a wave of renewed Indian pride and government reform. Oakes, a Mohawk Indian and a student at San Francisco State College, organized a gathering at San Francisco and began reading a proclamation reclaiming the former site of the federal prison "by right of discovery", and made an offer to compensate the United States government with "24 dollars in glass beads and red cloth", based on an apocryphal story that Dutch West India Company had paid 60 Dutch guilders to a group of Delaware Indians for their rights to Manhattan Island. After telling reporters that the offer followed "a precedent set by the white man's purchase of a similar island about 300 years ago", Oakes then accepted an offer by Canadian yacht owner Ronald Craig to sail over to Alcatraz at no charge, and 50 boarded the Monte Cristo. Oakes and Chippewa businessman Adam Fortunate Eagle (at the time, Adam Nordwall) swam to the island along with two other men. The group stayed for 15 minutes, and then was escorted back in a small boat, but Oakes and 13 others returned that evening and spent the night before being returned to the mainland on a U.S. Coast Guard cutter. After the symbolic taking of the island, a much longer siege would begin 11 days later on November 20, and would last until June 11, 1971.
- The end of the daily rum ration, enjoyed by sailors of Britain's Royal Navy for more than two centuries, was announced by the Ministry of Defence. The "tot", consisting of 71 millilitres (2.5 imp fl oz; 2.4 US fl oz) of 95.5 proof rum, was given at mid-day as a morale-booster for the men at sea and had been a practice introduced in 1731. The serving of the rum would formally end on August 1, 1970.

== November 10, 1969 (Monday) ==
- The eight-team International Boxing League, a venture of Chicago sportscaster Jack Drees, made its debut at 8:00 in the evening before about 200 people at the Memorial Auditorium in Louisville, Kentucky. The Kentucky Pacers defeated the Milwaukee Bombers, 50 to 20, in the inaugural meet. An IBL card consisted of seven bouts (of three rounds apiece) in weight classes ranging from bantamweight to heavyweight. For each bout, a team would be credited with one point for each round that was a draw, two points for winning a round, and four points for winning the bout. Drees had proposed the idea of teams of amateur boxers to compete against each other in advance of an eventual professional boxing team league. With the approval of the Amateur Athletic Union for the idea, the other six teams in the IBL were the Detroit Dukes, Miami Barracudas and New York Jolts in the Eastern Division and the Chicago Clippers, Denver Rocks and St. Louis Saints in the Western Division. The New York Jolts would win the first IBL title, 46–24, over the Chicago Clippers on June 19, 1970.
- Sesame Street aired its first episode on the National Educational Television (NET) network, the predecessor to the Public Broadcasting System (PBS), starting after school at various times. As one critic noted in informing parents that the new show for preschool children presented the alphabet and numerals in the form of commercials, "The first edition of Sesame Street comes to you today... through the courtesy of the numbers 2 and 3, and the letters E, S and W." The AP's TV critic, Cynthia Lowry, praised the show as "a delight" that "is bound to have many post-school fans" as well and noted that new characters introduced were "a huge creature called Big Bird and another called Kermit the Frog" while Rick DuBrow of UPI said that "This gentle, witty series... has the sound and feel of people who know and love children— not those whose idea is to exploit them."
- The U.S. Central Intelligence Agency (CIA) tested the first supersonic drone aircraft, the D-21 TAGBOARD, on a secret reconnaissance mission over China. Flying at an altitude of 84,000 feet (26,000 m) and a speed of Mach 3.27, the drone deviated from its planned route because of programming errors in its inertial navigation system, and self-destructed a pre-set altitude after exhausting its fuel supply, and no data was recovered.
- Born:
  - Jens Lehmann, German soccer football goalkeeper for Borussia Dortmund, Arsenal, and the German national team; in Essen, West Germany
  - Faustino Asprilla, Colombian soccer football forward and national team member; in Tuluá
  - Ellen Pompeo, American TV and film actress; in Everett, Massachusetts
- Died: Sir David Rose, 46, 2nd Governor-General of Guyana since 1966, was killed in a freak accident while visiting London, as a nine-story tall scaffolding collapsed on his limousine while he was in front of Britain's Parliament Square.

== November 11, 1969 (Tuesday) ==
- Ferdinand Marcos was re-elected to a four year term as President of the Philippines, defeating Senator Sergio Osmeña Jr. in a landslide and winning more than 60 percent of the vote. Marcos's Nacionalista Party also increased its huge majorities in the Philippine Senate, with 19 of the 24 seats, and in the Philippine House of Representatives (88 of the 110 seats) in what a news service described as "what appeared to be the Philippines' bloodiest election on record", with at least 65 people killed in political violence since campaigning began, and orders from President Marcos to have the National Police shoot any armed person attempting to harass voters.
- One day after pleading not guilty in Miami to charges of indecent exposure and public intoxication during a March 1 concert, rock singer Jim Morrison was arrested again upon his arrival in Phoenix, Arizona. Morrison and his friend Tom Baker were charged with the federal offense of interfering with an airline flight, arising out of their disorderly conduct during a Continental Airlines flight from Los Angeles. A federal judge would later dismiss the charges against Morrison on April 20, 1970.

== November 12, 1969 (Wednesday) ==
- The story of the 1968 My Lai Massacre was revealed to the public by freelance American investigative reporter Seymour Hersh, who was contributing to the Dispatch News Service. Hersh started with the words, "Lt. William L. Calley Jr., 26 years old, is a mild-mannered, boyish-looking Vietnam combat veteran with the nickname 'Rusty'. The Army is completing an investigation of charges that he deliberately murdered at least 109 Vietnamese civilians in a search-and-destroy mission in March 1968 in a Viet Cong stronghold known as 'Pinkville'...." The New York Times published a similar report from its own reporter, Robert M. Smith, at the same time.
- Five Americans and one New Zealander became the first women to visit the South Pole. Four of the group, led by Dr. Lois Jones, were researchers from Ohio State University and Pam Young was from the New Zealand Antarctic Research Operation. Jean Pearson was sent as the science writer for the Detroit News. All six were flown to the Pole by helicopter from the American research center at McMurdo Station on New Zealand's Ross Island, and arrived at 23:05 UTC (12:05 p.m. on Thursday at McMurdo).
- The cartoon character Fat Albert was introduced in an NBC television special titled "Hey, Hey, Hey, It's Fat Albert". The character, based on comedian Bill Cosby's memories of his childhood friend Albert Robinson and characters based on Cosby and Albert's friends, would later become part of a regular cartoon series on CBS from 1972 to 1985 and a 2004 live action film.
- Born: Ian Bremmer, American political scientist and best-selling author; in Baltimore
- Died: William F. Friedman, 78, Russian-born American cryptographer

== November 13, 1969 (Thursday) ==
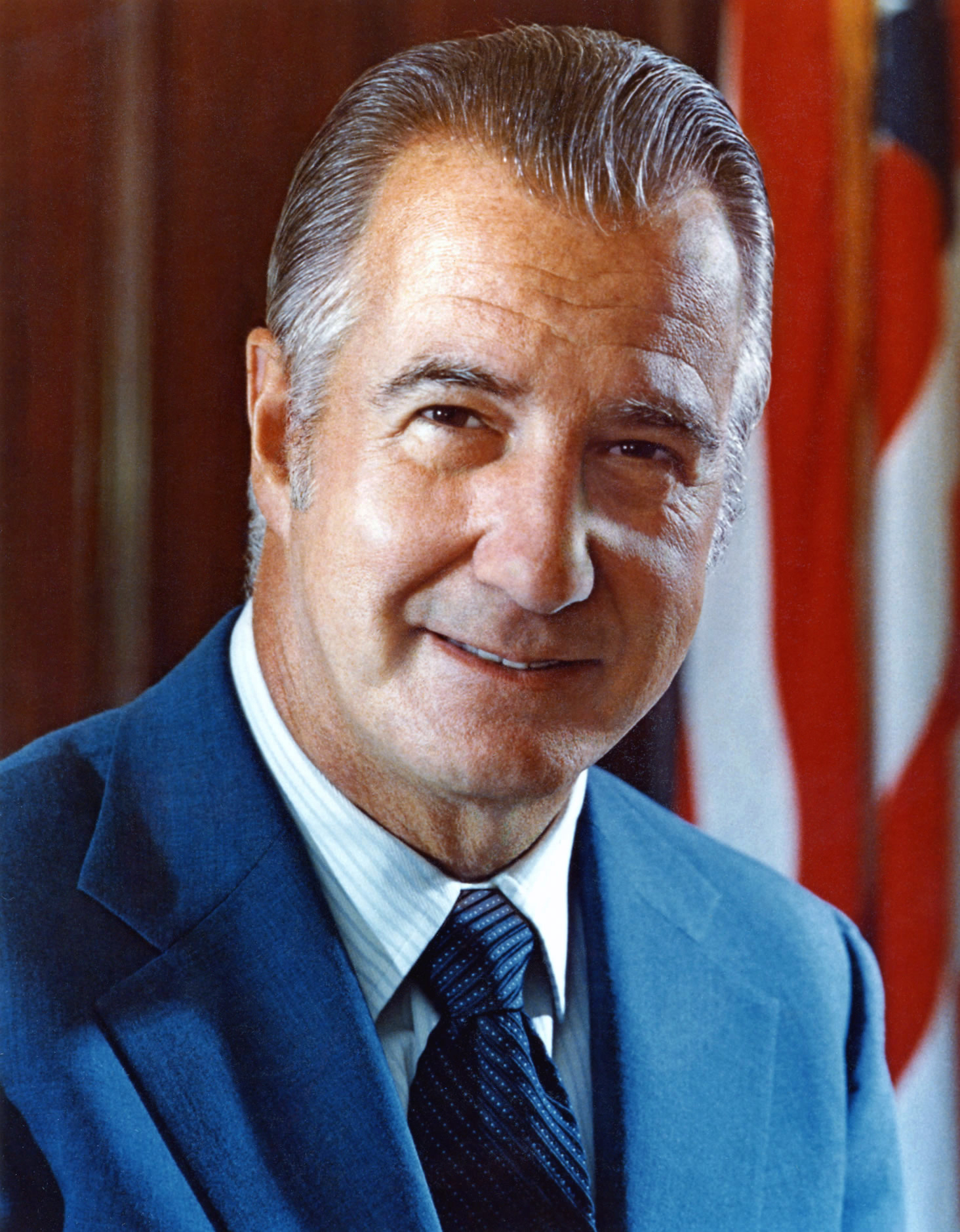
Vice President Agnew

- U.S. Vice President Spiro Agnew took the unprecedented step of accusing the three American television networks (whose affiliate stations' broadcast rights were licensed by the United States government) of letting their newscasters and commentators of abusing "a concentration of power over American public opinion, unknown in history" and hinting that "perhaps it is time that the networks were made more responsive to the views of the nation and more responsible to the people they serve", and urged Americans to call and write their local TV stations. Agnew, who previously delivered criticism against opponents of Nixon's policies, delivered the criticism after a disappointing response from the networks' news to President Nixon's Vietnamization speech of November 3. The site was the "Midwest Regional Republican Conference", an annual meeting of 500 Republican Party campaign strategists, which was being held at the Hotel Fort Des Moines in Des Moines, Iowa.
- In the advance texts sent to the networks, Agnew wrote "whether what I have said to you tonight will be heard or seen at all by the nation is not my decision; it is not your decision; it is their decision" and, as the New York Times reported the next day, "The networks... accepted the challenge. They all carried the speech live." The network presidents then gave their response, with Frank Stanton of CBS calling it "an unprecedented attempt by the vice president of the United States to intimidate a news medium which depends for its existence upon government licenses."
- Production of the five cent Hershey bar was discontinued by America's largest chocolate manufacturer, as a result of the rising costs of cocoa beans. A statement by the Hershey Company said that "the decision to discontinue the nickel bar had been made by its board of directors only after much deliberation because of the important place these bars have held with its customers and the consumer throughout the history of the company."
- U.S. Senator Gaylord Nelson of Wisconsin and U.S. Representative Pete McCloskey of California announced in Washington that Wednesday, April 22, 1970, would be the day for the first "National Teach-In on the Crisis of the Environment" on American college campuses. Now observed annually on April 22 around the world, the event is better known as "Earth Day".
- The Presidential Citizens Medal, the second-highest civilian award in the United States (after the Presidential Medal of Freedom, created in 1963), was established by Executive Order 11494 from U.S. President Nixon, to recognize United States citizens "who have performed exemplary deeds of service for their country or their fellow citizens".
- Born: Gerard Butler, Scottish film actor; in Paisley, Renfrewshire
- Died: Iskander Mirza, 70, first President of Pakistan from 1956 to 1958

== November 14, 1969 (Friday) ==
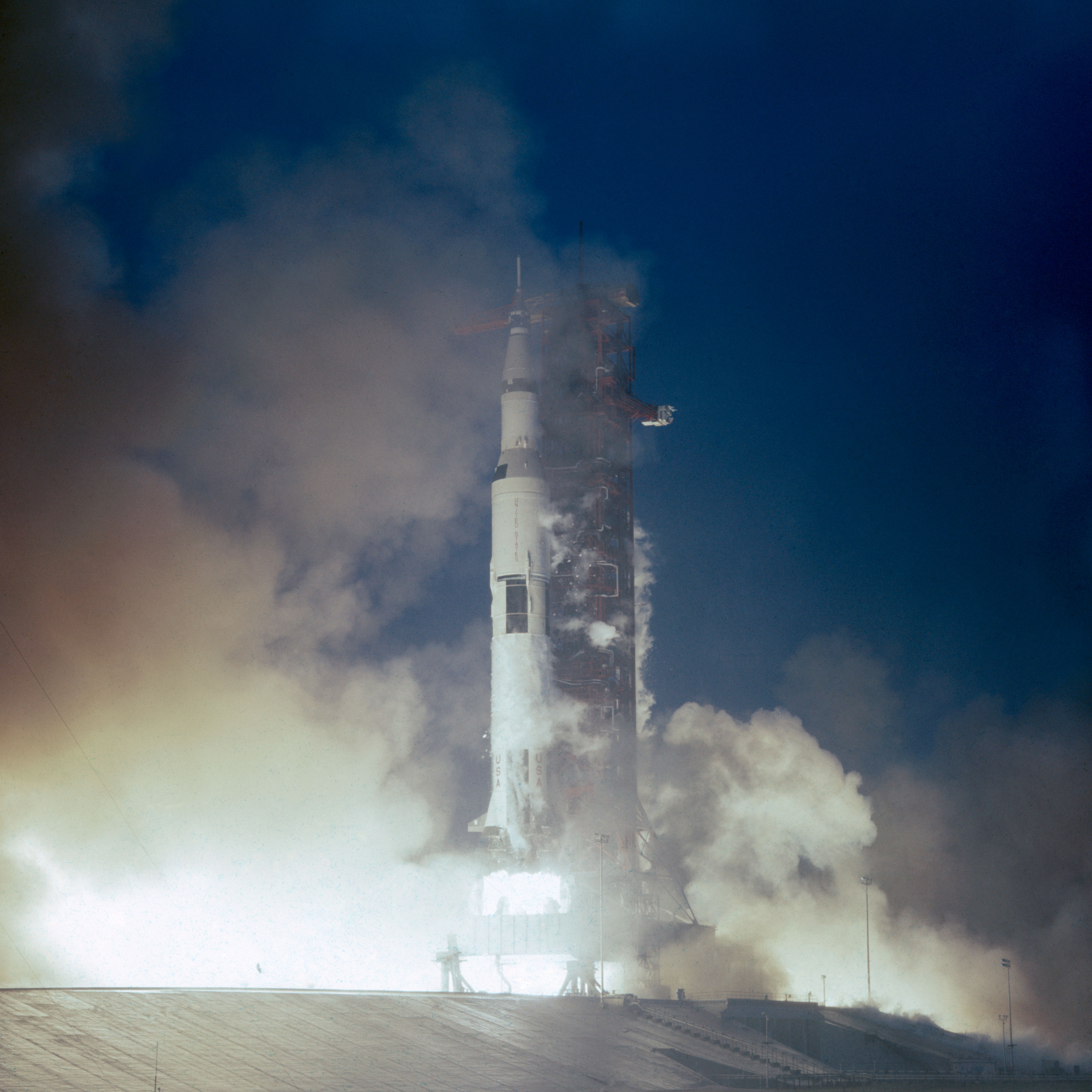
November 14, 1969: Launch of Apollo 12

- At 11:22 in the morning local time (1622 UTC), NASA launched Apollo 12 from Cape Kennedy in Florida, with Pete Conrad, Richard Gordon and Alan Bean, making the second crewed mission to a Moon landing. After being sent up during a rainstorm (in spite of Rule I-404 of the Manned Space Flight Center), the rocket was struck by lightning, 36 seconds into its ascent, and again 16 seconds later, experiencing electrical surges that shut down the computer for the fuel cells; fortunately, the main computer in the Instrument Unit "soldiered on without a hiccup". Inspections by the crew of the orbiter and the lunar module found no damage after the ship achieved Earth orbit. A little more than an hour after reaching parking orbit, Apollo 12 fired its third stage at 2:09 to begin its four-day travel toward the Moon.

== November 15, 1969 (Saturday) ==
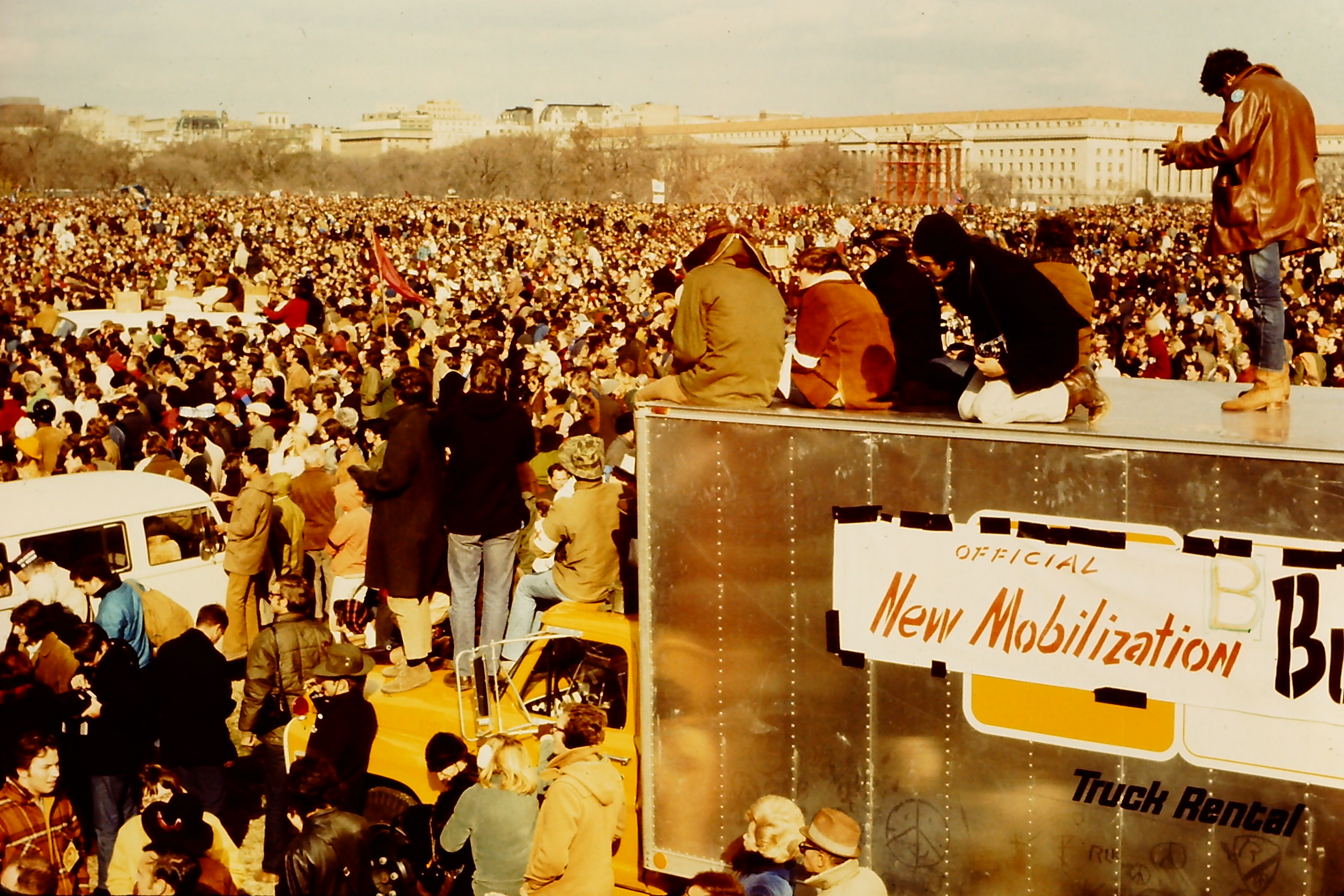
November 15, 1969: Anti-Vietnam War demonstrators near the Washington Monument

- In Washington, D.C., more than 500,000 protesters staged "the largest peace march on Washington in American history" for the second "Moratorium to End the War in Vietnam". The event, which was also held on a smaller scale in other American cities, included a symbolic "March Against Death".
- The first Wendy's "old fashioned" hamburger restaurant was opened, as businessman Dave Thomas began business at 257 East Broad Street in downtown Columbus, Ohio. "Wendy" was Thomas's eight year old daughter Melinda "Wendy" Thomas, who served also as the model for the "smiling little girl" on the restaurant's sign and logo. Despite having a higher price for its freshly cooked, made-to-order, square hamburgers, the restaurant was so popular that it began making a profit by the end of the year.
- Regular color television broadcasts began a few seconds after midnight on BBC1, following the lead of the less popular BBC2 two years earlier, with a one-hour special, An Evening with Petula, a concert by popular singer Petula Clark.
- The Soviet submarine K-19 collided with the American submarine USS Gato in the Barents Sea.
- Died: Billy Southworth, 76, American baseball player and manager

== November 16, 1969 (Sunday) ==
- Singer Janis Joplin was arrested at the Curtis Hixon Convention Center in Tampa, Florida and charged with obscenity for using profanity while addressing the police during a concert. Tampa police allowed her to finish her set of seven songs before arresting her backstage. She posted a $504 bond and was released. Her hearing date in municipal court would be postponed four times. On March 4, 1970, she would be fined $200 and costs after failing to appear for a scheduled trial date. Joplin would die of a heroin overdose exactly seven months later.
- Died: Reet Jurvetson, 19, Canadian murder victim who would be listed as "Jane Doe Number 59" by the Los Angeles Police Department until her identification by a friend of her family more than 45 years later. A 15-year-old boy discovered her body while hiking in the hills above Hollywood near Mulholland Drive and Kimridge Road. Jurvetson, the 59th unidentified female body found in Los Angeles County during the year, had been stabbed more than 150 times; Vincent Bugliosi would refer to her in his book, Helter Skelter, as a possible victim of the Manson Family. The case would be reopened in 2003 with the isolation of a DNA sample from the evidence, and her identity would finally be confirmed in 2016.

== November 17, 1969 (Monday) ==
- Negotiators from the Soviet Union and the United States met in Helsinki, to begin the first Strategic Arms Limitation Talks (SALT I), negotiations aimed at limiting the number of nuclear missiles and bombers on both sides. Gerard C. Smith, Director of the U.S. Arms Control and Disarmament Agency, led the American delegation while Vladimir Semyonov negotiated for the Soviet Union. After five weeks, preliminary discussions were adjourned on December 22 and would resume on April 16, 1970, in Vienna.

== November 18, 1969 (Tuesday) ==
- "J002E3", which would return to Earth orbit 33 years later, began its journey during the "CSM-LM separation" phase of the Apollo 12 mission. The object had been the third and last stage of the Saturn V rocket that had brought the Apollo 12 crew to lunar orbit, and at 16:16 UTC, was separated from the command module Yankee Clipper and the lunar module Intrepid. The rocket stage engines were fired to send it away from the Moon, with the intention of putting it into orbit around the Sun. For decades, the third stage continued its heliocentric orbit until April 2002, when its path took it near Earth's L1 Lagrange point and entered Earth orbit. The object would be discovered by Canadian amateur astronomer Bill Yeung on September 3, 2002, and the Jet Propulsion Laboratory (JPL) would determine that J002E3, was "the first known case of an object being captured by the Earth". J002E3's orbital path was such that JPL calculated that it would leave Earth orbit again in June 2003.
- Born:
  - Raghib "Rocket" Ismail, American college, Canadian and NFL football wide receiver; in Elizabeth, New Jersey
  - Duncan Sheik, American singer-songwriter and composer (Spring Awakening), in Montclair, New Jersey (d. 2026)
- Died: Joseph P. Kennedy Sr., 81, American financier, diplomat and father of the Kennedy political dynasty

== November 19, 1969 (Wednesday) ==
- Apollo 12 astronauts Pete Conrad and Alan Bean landed the lunar module Intrepid at the northern edge of the crater Mare Cognitum within the Oceanus Procellarum ("Ocean of Storms") area, at 0655 UTC (1:55 Florida time), becoming the third and fourth humans to reach the surface of the Moon. Conrad became the third person to walk on the Moon, at 1145 UTC and Bean alighted almost half an hour later at 1214 UTC. Richard F. Gordon remained in orbit, piloting the mothership Yankee Clipper. The landing was made to come close to the Surveyor 3 lunar probe that had arrived on the Moon two years and seven months earlier, on April 19, 1967, and set down only 200 metres (660 ft) away. A plan to televise live color images from the Moon was ruined after Bean accidentally pointed the camera at the Sun, burning out the imaging tube.
- Edson Arantes do Nascimento of Brazil, known worldwide as Pelé, became the first professional soccer football player to score 1,000 goals in a career. O Milésimo ("The Thousandth") came in the 77th minute of play during a penalty kick for his team, Santos, against CR Vasco da Gama at Maracanã Stadium in Rio de Janeiro and was made past goalkeeper Norberto Andrada. The milestone, anticipated around the globe, also proved to be the margin of victory in Santos' 2 to 1 win over Vasco da Gama.
- All 14 people on board Mohawk Airlines Flight 411 were killed when the Fairchild FH-227B crashed in New York's Adirondack Mountains during a short flight from Albany to Glens Falls.

== November 20, 1969 (Thursday) ==
- The Occupation of Alcatraz for a year and half began two weeks after a symbolic claim on the California island. At about 5:00 in the morning as the first of five boatloads of American Indians of various tribes arrived and took up residence. In all, 78 people arrived for the first occupation and set up camps. Claiming the island from the U.S. government based on a 19th century land treaty, the group announced that it would stay indefinitely. The occupation would continue until June 11, 1971. With only 15 occupiers remaining by then, the group would be taken into custody by United States Marshals and the U.S. Coast Guard.
- Astronauts Pete Conrad and Alan Bean ascended from the Moon and docked with the orbiter Yankee Clipper. After re-entering the orbiter, the astronauts sent the lunar module Intrepid rocketing back toward the Moon, crashing it into the lunar surface at a speed of 3,700 miles per hour (6,000 km/h) in order to measure the impact of an object of known weight and speed to serve as a standard for evaluating future seismological readings. The Intrepid crash left a man-made elliptical lunar crater measuring 20 feet (6.1 m) by 40 feet (12 m), and roughly 20 inches (510 mm) deep.
- All 87 people on Nigeria Airways Flight 825 were killed when the Vickers VC-10 jet struck trees during its attempted landing at Lagos at the end of a multi-stop flight that had originated in London.
- A Cleveland, Ohio newspaper, The Plain Dealer, published explicit photographs of dead villagers from the My Lai Massacre in Vietnam.
- Born: Dabo Swinney (William C. Swinney), American college football coach; in Birmingham, Alabama

== November 21, 1969 (Friday) ==
- By a margin of 45 "yes" to 55 "no", the United States Senate rejected the nomination of Clement Haynsworth to be an Associate Justice on the Supreme Court. All 100 U.S. Senators participated in a roll call vote, in alphabetical order, that took 11 minutes to complete. The "no" vote from Maryland senator Joe Tydings marked 51 against 44 "yes", ending the possibility of confirmation.
- The connection between the interface message processors at the University of California, Los Angeles (UCLA), and the Stanford Research Institute (SRI, in Menlo Park, California) was made permanent, creating the first link of ARPANET, the Advanced Research Projects Agency Network. ARPANET would exist until 1990 and serve as the progenitor of the global Internet.
- U.S. President Richard Nixon and Japanese Premier Eisaku Satō agreed in Washington, D.C. to the return of Okinawa to Japanese control in 1972. Under the terms of the agreement, the U.S. retained rights to military bases on the island, but on condition that they be free of nuclear weapons.
- Skynet 1, the United Kingdom's first military communications satellite, was launched into outer space from Cape Kennedy in the United States. It entered its designated orbit three days later to begin service.
- Born: Ken Griffey Jr., American baseball outfielder and Baseball Hall of Fame inductee; in Donora, Pennsylvania
- Died:
  - Frederick Mutesa, 45, first President of Uganda from 1963 to 1966 and monarch of the semi-autonomous kingdom of Buganda as the Kabaka Mutesa II from 1939 until 1967; of alcohol poisoning.
  - Norman Lindsay, 90, Australian illustrator and artist

== November 22, 1969 (Saturday) ==
- Michigan ended Ohio State's 22-game college football winning streak, with a 24–12 upset at Ann Arbor. With the defeat, the #1 ranked Ohio State Buckeyes, who held the unofficial 1968 college football championship, dropped from first place to #4 in the next wire-service polls and the second-ranked University of Texas Longhorns and fourth-ranked University of Arkansas Razorbacks, scheduled to meet on December 6, moved to first and second place.

== November 23, 1969 (Sunday) ==
- The South Tyrolean People's Party (Südtiroler Volkspartei or SVP), which had lobbied for more than 20 years for greater autonomy for the German-speaking people of Italy's South Tyrol province, approved the Italian government's proposals to settle the dispute regarding the status of the border region and granting many of the Party's demands. At the urging of SVP leader Silvius Magnago, delegates to the SVP convention voted 583 to 492 to accept the package, paving the way for an agreement between Italy and neighboring Austria.
- In the first known incident of fragging during the Australian participation in the Vietnam War, Royal Australian Regiment Lieutenant Robert T. Convery was killed when Private Peter D. Allen rolled a live grenade into the tent where Convery was sleeping. Private Allen was convicted of the murder, and sentenced to life imprisonment, but released after less than 11 years.
- Born: Robin Padilla, Philippine action film star; in Manila
- Died: Donnell "Spade" Cooley, 58, American musician known as the "king of Western swing" prior to his conviction of murder; of a heart attack following a performance for a police officers benefit concert in Oakland.

== November 24, 1969 (Monday) ==
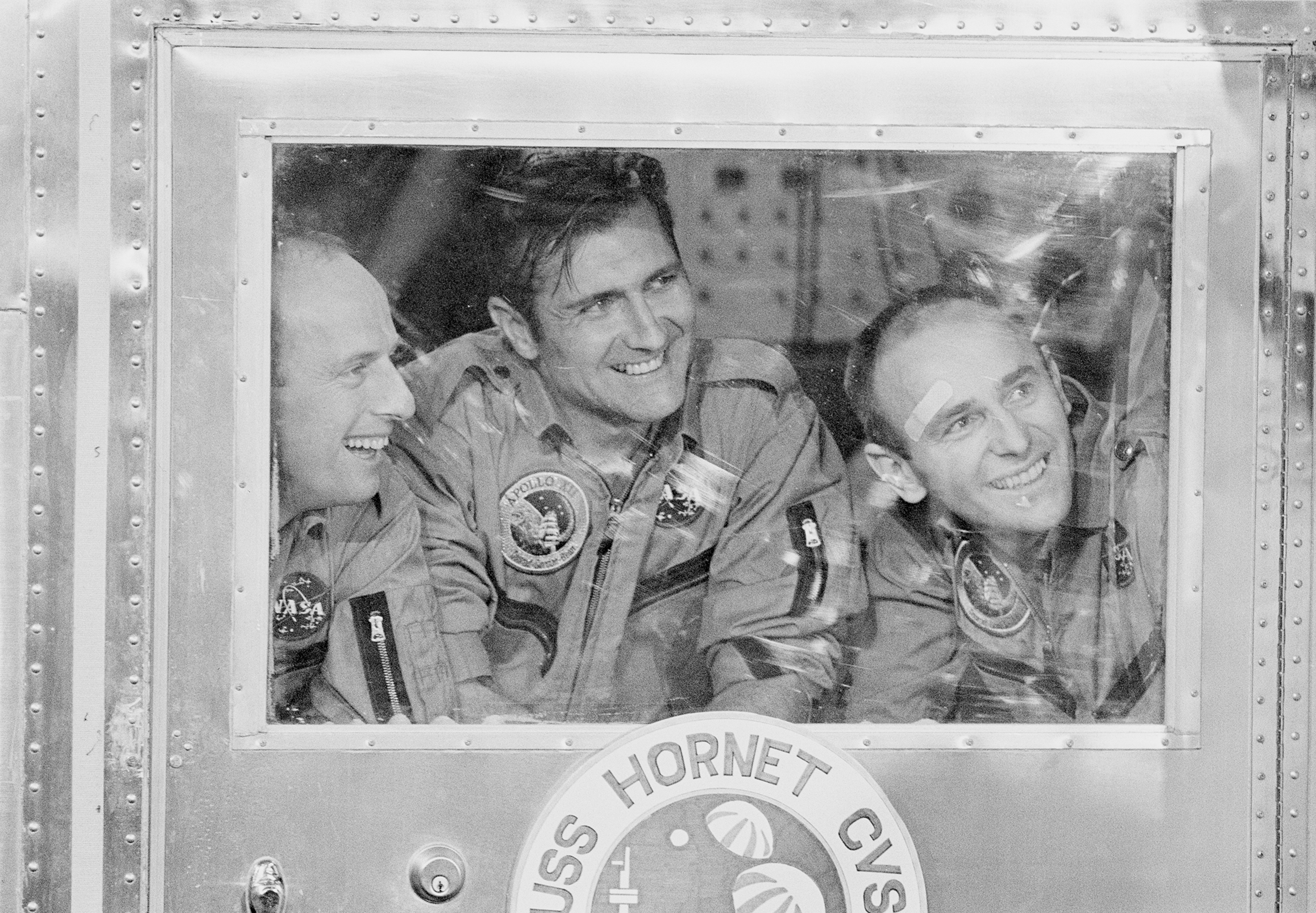
Apollo 12 crew in quarantine

- The Apollo 12 spacecraft splashed down safely in the Pacific Ocean at 21:57 UTC, ending the second crewed mission to the Moon. The capsule landed in the South Pacific Ocean only 3.1 miles (5.0 km) from the aircraft carrier USS Hornet, at a point about 400 miles (640 km) southeast of American Samoa. As with the Apollo 11 astronauts, the crew of Apollo 12 was placed into a mobile quarantine unit while scientists did tests to see if the trio had returned to Earth with microorganisms; they would be allowed to leave after 21 days confinement that found no contamination.
- The United States and the Soviet Union both signaled their joint ratification of the Treaty on the Non-Proliferation of Nuclear Weapons and the simultaneous signing of the document in both nations. The U.S. Senate had voted, 83 to 15, to approve the treaty on March 13, but U.S. President Nixon had delayed formal acceptance until November 24, when the Presidium of the Soviet Union voted to allow President Nikolai V. Podgorny to ratify the treaty on behalf of the USSR.
- Guru Nanak Dev University was established Amritsar in India's Punjab state, on the 500th birthday of the founder of Sikhism, Guru Nanak (b. November 24, 1469, d. September 22, 1539). Located in the Amritsar suburb of Kot Khalsa, GNDU now has 20,000 students.
- The U.S. Army ordered the court-martial of 1st Lieutenant William L. Calley, Jr. on 109 charges of murder in connection with the My Lai Massacre of 1968.

== November 25, 1969 (Tuesday) ==
- U.S. President Nixon announced in a statement that "The United States shall renounce the use of lethal biological agents and weapons, and all other methods of biological warfare" after noting that he had ordered a review of weapons policies and declaring that "Biological weapons have massive, unpredictable and potentially uncontrollable consequences. They may produce global epidemics and impair the health of future generations." Nixon closed by saying that "Mankind already carries in its own hands too many of the seeds of its own destruction. By the examples we set today, we hope to contribute to an atmosphere of peace and understanding between nations and among men."
- The American Falls portion of Niagara Falls began cascading again, more than five months after the water had been blocked by an artificial dam so that erosion and rock slides could be brought under control. The cofferdam had been completed on June 12 and the river bed in front of it dried. Horseshoe Falls and the Bridal Veil Falls had continued unimpeded, but for nearly half a year, visitors were able to walk across the area where the American Falls had been. At 11:05 in the morning, an hour after the removal of 27,800 tons (25,220 metric tons) of rock and dirt had finished, the first waters of the American Falls began flowing again.
- John Lennon returned his MBE medal to protest the British government's involvement in the Nigerian Civil War.
- Died: Dr. Hans Reiter, 88, German physician and convicted Nazi war criminal

== November 26, 1969 (Wednesday) ==
- The first nationwide teachers' strike in British history began as thousands of State Education Board schoolteachers walked off the job in protest of low wages. At the time, the gross wage for public education teachers ranged from £16 to £30 ($39 to $74) per week. The initial walkouts of half a day or more were a warning in advance of the strike to being on December 1.
- U.S. President Nixon signed into law a provision for the first "draft lottery", with random selection of "the dates of the year and then of the letters of the alphabet" to determine which young men would be picked first for military service, with the picks to be made on Monday, December 1.

== November 27, 1969 (Thursday) ==
- Israeli Aircraft Industries (IAI) unveiled the first airplane to be both designed and built in Israel, as the IAI Arava made its first test flight. A turboprop military transport aircraft, the Arava initially had room for a pilot, a co-pilot, and 19 passengers. A little more than 90 of the Arava models would be sold.

== November 28, 1969 (Friday) ==
- A Lockheed L-749A Constellation airplane crashed into the western face of Tibherine, part of the High Atlas Mountains in Morocco, and a 12,783 ft (3,896 m) peak in the Toubkal National Park. The L-749A, chartered to carry weapons for Biafra during that region's war of secession from Nigeria, had departed the Faro Airport in Portugal and was flying to the island of São Tomé when all three of its engines failed over North Africa. The wreckage would finally be discovered 18 months later, on July 18, 1970, by a group of mountain climbers, along with the bodies of all eight people who had been on board. Pieces of the airplane remain scattered across the mountain (including the engine, on the top of Tibherine) and are a popular sight for climbers.
- Pakistan's President, General Yahya Khan, made a nationwide address announcing that he would eventually restore constitutional government and that parliamentary elections would be held in 1970 for the first time since the nation became independent in 1947. The outcome of the vote would eventually lead to the breakup of Pakistan, with East Pakistan seceding to become the nation of Bangladesh.
- Died:
  - Betsy Aardsma, 22, American college student and murder victim, was fatally stabbed while doing schoolwork at the library at Penn State University. No person was ever arrested for, or charged with, her murder, which took place in the afternoon during regular library hours. The case was never solved, although in 2008, an author would identify an acquaintance (by then, deceased), of Aardsma, as a likely suspect.
  - Roy Barcroft (stage name for Howard Ravenscroft), 67, American character actor in film, known for being the villain in more than 300 films for Republic Pictures.

== November 29, 1969 (Saturday) ==
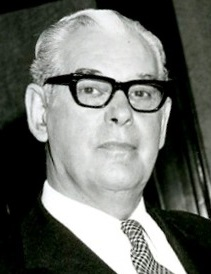
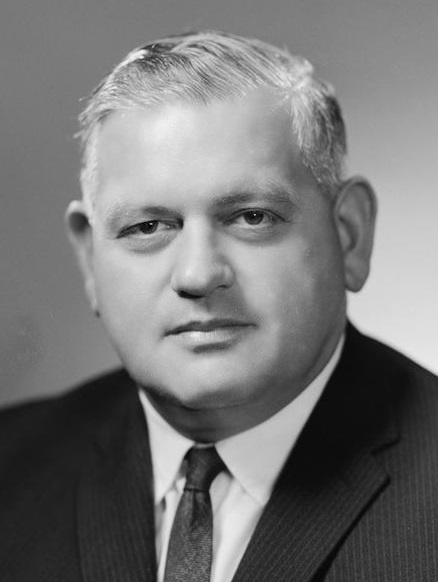
Holyoake (National), Kirk (Labour)
- Elections were held in New Zealand for the unicameral New Zealand Parliament. Keith Holyoake, Prime Minister since 1960, retained his office and his National Party gained one seat, holding 45 of the 84, slightly more than the 43 needed for a majority government. Norman Kirk's Labour Party won the other 39 seats, gaining four.
- Born:
  - Kasey Keller, American soccer football goalkeeper and U.S. national team member; in Olympia, Washington
  - Pierre van Hooijdonk, Netherlands soccer football striker and national team member; in Steenbergen
  - Mariano "Mo" Rivera, Panamanian-born American baseball pitcher; in Panama City

== November 30, 1969 (Sunday) ==
- Charles Denton "Tex" Watson, who had carried out most of the shooting or killing of the seven victims of the Tate-La Bianca murders at the direction of Charles Manson, was arrested in McKinney, Texas after the Los Angeles Police Department identified his fingerprints from the crime scenes. Watson would successfully resist extradition until his return to California on September 11, 1970, and would later be convicted on seven counts of first degree murder and sentenced to life imprisonment.
- In Moscow, thousands of Russian visitors packed into an exhibition hall to see the first Moon rock to be brought to the Soviet Union. The rock was part of an exhibit of United States scientific achievements and included one of the samples of lunar soil brought back by the Apollo 11 mission.
- The Ottawa Rough Riders defeated the Saskatchewan Roughriders, 29 to 11, to win the Grey Cup for the championship of the Canadian Football League. Ottawa's Russ Jackson, the game's Most Valuable Player, became the last Canadian citizen to throw a touchdown pass in the championship game, and it would take another 48 years before a Canadian quarterback even threw a touchdown in the CFL playoffs.
- The very first NCAA Men's Water Polo Championship was held, with the UCLA Bruins defeating the California Golden Bears, 5 to 2, to win the NCAA title and to finish an unbeaten season with 19 wins and no losses. During the first 56 championships, no team from outside of California ever appeared in the finals, with the most titles having been won by the University of California (17), followed by UCLA (13), Stanford (11), USC (10), UC Irvine (3), Pepperdine (1) and UC Santa Barbara (1). Pacific, UC San Diego, Long Beach State, and San Jose State have been in the finals without winning
- Born: Trina Gulliver, English professional darts champion; in Leamington Spa, Warwickshire
