= Joey DeFrancesco discography =

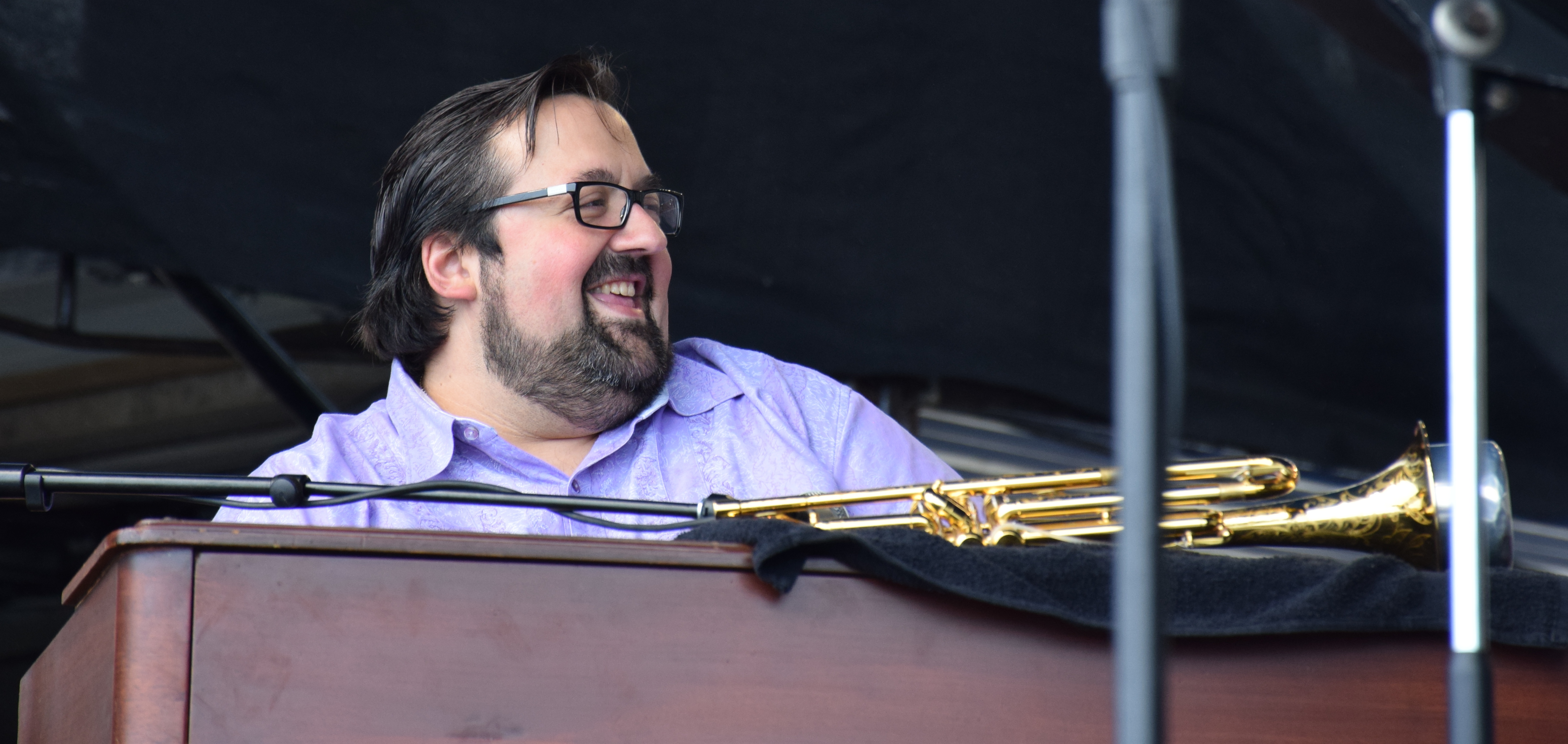
- DeFrancesco, Newport Jazz Festival, 2014
- Studio albums: 31
- Live albums: 1
- Compilation albums: 1
- Albums as sideman: 48

This article presents the discography of the American jazz organist, trumpeter, saxophonist, and occasional singer, Joey DeFrancesco (1971–2022).

DeFrancesco had his recording debut at age 17 when his album All of Me was released on Columbia Records, a label with which he would record five albums. He would later release albums for HighNote, Big Mo, Concord Jazz, and Mack Avenue, among other labels.

== Discography ==
=== Studio albums ===
Year	Title	Label	Format	Notes
1989	All of Me	Columbia	LP, CD	with guest Houston Person
1990	Where Were You?	Columbia	CD	with guests Illinois Jacquet, Kirk Whalum, and John Scofield
1991	Part III	Columbia	CD	with guest "Papa" John DeFrancesco
1992	Reboppin'	Columbia	CD	with guests "Papa" John and Johnny DeFrancesco
1993	Live at the 5 Spot	Columbia	CD	with guests Illinois Jacquet, Grover Washington Jr., Houston Person, Kirk Whalum, and Jack McDuff
1994	Relentless	Big Mo	CD	with Danny Gatton
1994	All About My Girl	Muse	CD	with Houston Person, Paul Bollenback and, Byron Landham
1995	The Street of Dreams	Big Mo	CD	with Paul Bollenback and Byron Landham
1996	It's About Time	Concord	SACD, CD	with Jack McDuff
1997	All in the Family	HighNote	CD	with "Papa" John DeFrancesco
1998	All or Nothing at All	Big Mo	CD	with Paul Bollenback and Byron Landham
1998	The Champ: Dedicated to Jimmy Smith	HighNote	CD	with Randy Johnston and Billy Hart
1999	Joey DeFrancesco's Goodfellas	Concord	CD	with Frank Vignola and Joe Ascione
2000	The JazzTimes Superband	Concord	CD	with Bob Berg, Randy Brecker, and Dennis Chambers
2000	Incredible!	Concord	CD	with guest Jimmy Smith
2000	The Champ: Round 2	HighNote	CD	with Paul Bollenback and Byron Landham
2001	Singin' and Swingin'	Concord	CD	with a big band, including Wayne Bergeron, Conte Candoli, Carl Saunders, George Bohanon, Andy Martin, Sal Lozano, Pete Christlieb, Rickey Woodard, Jack Nimitz, Ray Brown, and Dave Cook
2002	The Philadelphia Connection: A Tribute to Don Patterson	HighNote	CD	with Paul Bollenback and Byron Landham
2002	Ballads and Blues	Concord	CD	with Pat Martino, Gary Bartz, and "Papa" John DeFrancesco
2003	Falling in Love Again	Concord	CD	with Joe Doggs (Joe Pesci)
2004	Plays Sinatra His Way	HighNote	CD	with Houston Person and Melvin Sparks. Recorded 1998.
2005	Legacy	Concord	CD	with Jimmy Smith and guest James Moody
2006	Organic Vibes	Concord	CD	with Bobby Hutcherson and George Coleman
2007	Live: The Authorized Bootleg	Concord	CD	with Jake Langley, Byron Landham, and guest George Coleman
2008	Joey D!	HighNote	CD	with Jerry Weldon
2008	Estate	Zucca	CD	with Massimo Faraò, Byron Landham, and Aldo Zunino
2009	Finger Poppin' – Celebrating the Music of Horace Silver	Doodlin'	CD	with Tom Harrell and Tim Warfield
2009	Snapshot (The Original Trio)	HighNote	CD	with Paul Bollenback and Byron Landham
2010	Never Can Say Goodbye: The Music of Michael Jackson	HighNote	CD	with Paul Bollenback and Byron Landham
2011	40	HighNote	CD	with Rick Zunigar and Ramon Banda [note: this is Joey's 29th album]
2011	The DeFrancesco Brothers: Joey & Johnny	Vectordisc	CD	
2012	Wonderful! Wonderful!	HighNote	CD	with Larry Coryell and Jimmy Cobb
2013	One for Rudy	HighNote	CD	with Steve Cotter and Ramon Banda
2014	Home for the Holidays	JD Music (thru Alma/Universal)	2xCD	with Jeff Parker, George Fludas, George Coleman, Jerry Weldon, John Webber, George Coleman Jr., Ramon Banda, Tony Banda, Papo Rodriguez, Steve Wilkerson
2015	Trip Mode	HighNote	CD	with Dan Wilson and Jason Brown
2017	Project Freedom	Mack Avenue	CD	with Dan Wilson, Jason Brown and Troy Roberts
2018	You're Driving Me Crazy	Sony Legacy	CD	with Van Morrison
2019	In the Key of the Universe	Mack Avenue	CD	with Pharoah Sanders and Billy Hart
2021	More Music	Mack Avenue	CD	with Lucas Brown and Michael Ode
2023	ArtWork	Calvary Productions/BFD	CD	with Jack Jones
2026	Live at Keystone Korner	Mack Avenue	CD	with Lucas Brown and Anwar Marshall

=== As sideman ===
Rel.	Performer	Title	Rec.	Label	Format	Notes
1987	Grover Washington, Jr.	Strawberry Moon		Columbia	LP, CD	
1989	Miles Davis	Amandla	1988–1989	Warner Bros.	LP, CD	
1991	Houston Person	The Party	1989	Muse	CD	with Randy Johnston
1991	Houston Person	Why Not!	1990	Muse	CD	with Philip Harper, Winard Harper and Randy Johnston
1993	"Papa" John DeFrancesco	Doodlin'	1992	Muse	CD	
1994	Ronnie Cuber	The Scene is Clean	1993	Milestone	CD	
1994	John McLaughlin	Tokyo Live	1993	Verve	CD	with Dennis Chambers
1995	Randy Johnston	In A-Chord	1994	Muse	CD	
1995	Dave Stryker Organ Trio	Stardust	1994	SteepleChase	CD	with Adam Nussbaum
1995	John McLaughlin	After the Rain	1994	Verve	CD	with Elvin Jones
1995	"Papa" John DeFrancesco	Comin' Home	1994	Muse	CD	
1995	John McLaughlin	The Promise		Verve	CD	
1996	Miles Davis	Live Around the World	1988–1991	Warner Bros.	2xLP, CD	
1996	Jimmy Bruno	Like That		Concord	CD	
1996	Essence All Stars	Organic Grooves		Hip Bop Essence/Silva Screen	CD	with Kenny Garrett, Grover Washington Jr., Dr. Lonnie Smith and Tony Purrone
1997	Didier Lockwood	Storyboard	1996	Dreyfus Jazz	CD	with Steve Gadd
1997	Marchel Ivery	Marchel Ivery Meets Joey DeFrancesco		Leaning House Jazz	CD	with Clint Strong
1997	Paul Bollenback	Double Gemini		Challenge	CD	with Jeff "Tain" Watts
1997	Houston Person	The Opening Round		Savant	CD	with Bernard Purdie
1998	Randy Johnston	Riding the Curve		J-Curve	CD	
1999	Doug Raney	The Backbeat	1997	SteepleChase	CD	with Billy Hart
1999	City Rhythm Orchestra	Swingin' Blue	1997	Limehouse	CD	
1999	Mimi Fox	Kicks	1998	Monarch	CD	
1999	Dave Cook & Intensity	Groovin' in the Dark		Chartmaker	CD	
1999	Marchel Ivery	Marchel Ivery 3		Leaning House Jazz	CD	
2000	Moe Denham	Little Blue Volkswagen		Burnt Weenie	CD	
2001	Randy Johnston	Detour Ahead	1998	HighNote	CD	
2001	"Papa" John DeFrancesco	Hip Cake Walk	2000	HighNote	CD	
2001	Pat Martino	Live at Yoshi's		Blue Note	CD	with Billy Hart
2002	Charles Earland Tribute Band	Keepers of the Flame	2000	HighNote	CD	with Jim Rotondi, Eric Alexander, Bob DeVos, Pat Martino
2003	Janis Siegel	Friday Night Special	2002	Telarc	CD	with Houston Person
2003	Joe Beck Trio	Girl Talk	2002	Venus	CD	with Idris Muhammad
2003	Mort Weiss	Mort Weiss Meets Joey DeFrancesco	2002	SMS Jazz	CD	with Ron Escheté and Ramon Banda
2003	Annie Sellick	No Greater Thrill		Chalice	CD	
2004	Ximo Tebar	The Champs	1999	Sunnyside	CD	with Idris Muhammad
2004	City Rhythm Orchestra	Vibrant Tones	2001/2003	Limehouse	CD, DVD	
2004	"Papa" John DeFrancesco	Walking Uptown		Savant	CD	
2004	Jake Langley	Diggin' In		Alma/Universal	CD	
2005	Terry Gibbs	Feelin' Good: Live in Studio		Mack Avenue	CD	
2005	Bette Midler	Bette Midler Sings the Peggy Lee Songbook		Columbia	CD	
2006	Ray Charles + Count Basie Orchestra	Ray Sings, Basie Swings	1973/2006	Concord	CD	
2006	HR Bigband (conducted by Jörg Achim Keller)	Once in a Lifetime	2003	TCB	CD	with Jeff Hamilton
2006	"Papa" John DeFrancesco	Desert Heat		Savant	CD	
2006	Jake Langley	Movin' & Groovin'		Alma/Universal	CD	
2008	Colleen McNabb	Don't Go to Strangers		Zucca	CD	with Jake Langley and Byron Landham
2009	"Papa" John DeFrancesco	Big Shot	2008	Savant	CD	
2010	Cory Weeds Quartet featuring Joey DeFrancesco	The Many Deeds of Cory Weeds		Cellar Live	LP, CD, DL	
2010	David Sanborn	Only Everything		Decca	CD	with Steve Gadd
2010	Lee Ritenour	6 String Theory		Concord	CD	with Pat Martino and George Benson
2010	Steve Gadd and Friends	Live at Voce		BFM Jazz	CD	with Ronnie Cuber and Paul Bollenback
2010	Dan Adler	Back to the Bridge		Emdan Music	CD	
2011	"Papa" John DeFrancesco	A Philadelphia Story	2010	Savant	CD	
2011	Frank Wess Quartet	Menage a Bleu		Labeth Music	CD	with Paul Bollenback and Byron Landham
2012	Bobby Hutcherson	Somewhere in the Night	2009	Kind of Blue	CD	with Peter Bernstein and Byron Landham
2012	Cinque	Catch a Corner		Alma/Universal	CD	with Steve Gadd
2014	Bobby Hutcherson	Enjoy the View		Blue Note	CD	with David Sanborn and Billy Hart
2015	Diana Krall	Wallflower (Deluxe Edition)	2014	Verve	CD	with Georgie Fame
2016	Eric Hargett Trio	Steppin' Up		Whaling City Sound	CD	with Gerry Gibbs
2016	Jimmy Scott	I Go Back Home: A Story About Hoping and Dreaming		Eden River Records	2xLP, CD	
2018	Count Basie Orchestra	All About That Basie		Concord	CD	
2018	Van Morrison	The Prophet Speaks		Exile/Caroline	CD	
2019	Troy Roberts	Days Like These		Toy Robot Music	CD	with Jeff "Tain" Watts
2020	Christian McBride	For Jimmy, Wes and Oliver		Mack Avenue	CD	with Mark Whitfield
2021	Temple University Jazz Band (directed by Terrel Stafford)	Without You, No Me: Honoring the Legacy of Jimmy Heath		BCM+D	CD	with Christian McBride
2021	Tom Cohen	My Take		Versa	CD	
2023	George Freeman	The Good Life	2022	HighNote	CD	
