= Joel Jaffe =

American musician, record producer, songwriter

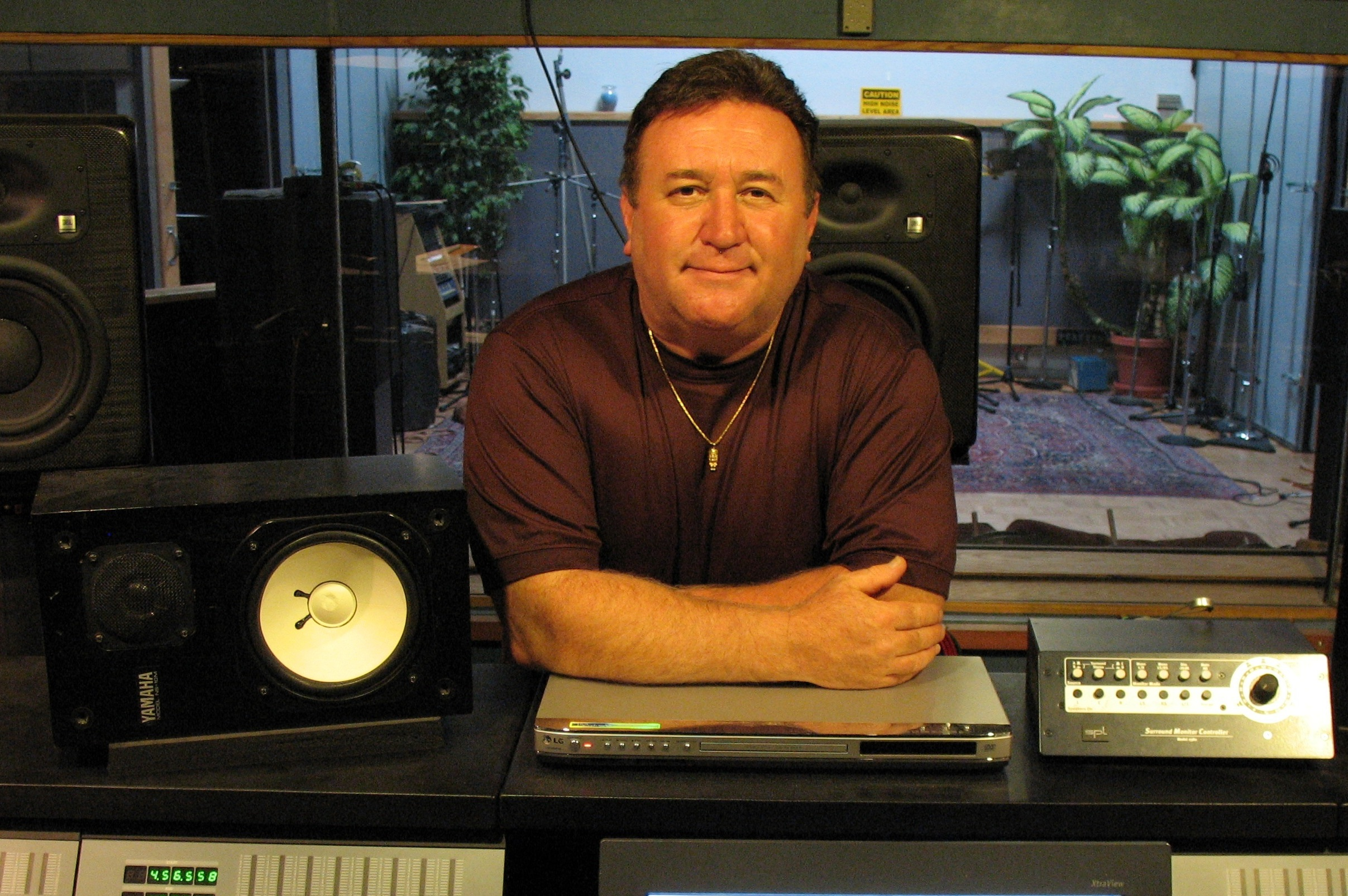
- Jaffe in 2007

Background information
- Born: Joel Jaffe; January 15, 1952 (age 74); Cleveland, Ohio, U.S.
- Genres: Pop; pop rock; Jazz; Americana; alternative rock; rock
- Occupations: Audio engineer; record producer; musician; composer; songwriter
- Instruments: Guitar; mandolin; pedal steel; dobro; lap steel; keyboards
- Years active: 1967–present
- Labels: BMG; Polygram; Island; Qwest
- Website: jjaffemusic.com

Joel Jaffe (born January 15, 1952), also known as J. Jaffe, is an American audio engineer, record producer, multi-instrumentalist, songwriter, and president and co-founder of Studio D Recording, Inc.

Jaffe has worked with artists including Huey Lewis and the News, Ringo Starr, Buddy Greco, Melissa Etheridge, The Stylistics, Eddie Money, Santana, and Bonnie Raitt.

In 2014, he released his debut album, Dark Room, which was included in the Marin Independent Journal's "Best of Marin CDs of 2014."

== Early life ==
Joel Jaffe was born in Cleveland, Ohio, United States, to Jay and Dorothy (Née Watkins) Jaffe. He began taking piano lessons from his mother at age six, as well as studying classical and jazz piano with other instructors. He began taking guitar lessons at age twelve after seeing The Beatles perform on The Ed Sullivan Show. In high school he formed the band The Illusions, performing at dances and parties, then at nightclubs opening shows for such artists as The Four Tops, The Everly Brothers, and The O'Jays.

Jaffe moved to California in the 1970s and began working at the Record Plant in Sausalito, California, mentored by Dr. Richie Moore who would eventually help Jaffe to build Studio D.

== Selected discography ==
Artist	Album	Credit	Year
Bruce Hornsby	Indigo Park	Engineer	2026
Mavis Staples	Sad and Beautiful World	Engineer	2025
The Fabulous Thunderbirds	Struck Down	Engineer	2024
The Call	The Lost Tapes	Engineer	2024
Bonnie Raitt	Just Like That...	Engineer	2022
Sheryl Crow	Threads	Engineer	2019
Van Morrison	The Prophet Speaks	Engineer	2018
Sheryl Crow	Live Wire	Audio engineer for Bonnie Raitt's recording	2018
Liz Kennedy	Hike Up Your Socks	Producer, engineer, mixing, guitar, mastering, dobro, lap steel, mandolin, background vocals	2018
Flamin' Groovies	Fantastic Plastic	Producer, engineer, mixing, guitar, lap steel, slide guitar	2017
Mitch Woods	Friends Along the Way	Engineer	2017
The Sneetches	Form of Play: A Retrospective	Engineer, lap steel	2017
Liz Kennedy	Speed Bump	Producer, engineer, mixing, guitar, mandolin, background vocals	2015
The Sneetches	Form of Play: A Retrospective	Engineer, lap steel	2017
	Midight Rider: A Tribute to the Allman Brothers Band	Engineer	2014
Chris Wilson	It's Flamin' Groovy!	Engineer	2014
Contino	Back Porch Dogma	Producer, engineer, mastering, percussion	2012
Flambeau/Tom Rigney	You're the One	Engineering	2012
Kirk Franklin	Kirk Franklin and the Family/What You Lookin' 4	Engineering	2011
Ray Manzarek and Roy Rogers	Translucent Blues	Engineer, associate producer	2011
Liz Kennedy	A Clean White Shirt	Engineer, producer, guitar	2011
Maria Muldaur	Steady Love	Mastering	2011
Roy Rogers	Into the Wild Blue	Engineer, mixing, mastering	2011
	This One's For Him: A Tribute to Guy Clark	Vocal engineering	2011
Paul Rogers	The Cul de Sac Kids	Mixing, mastering	2010
Bill Kirchen	Word to the Wise	Engineering	2010
Coto Pincheira	Coto Pincheira & The Sonido Moderno Project	Recording	2009
Jackie Ryan	Doozy	Mastering	2009
Roy Rogers	Split Decisions	Engineering, mixing	2009
Ashling	Sweet Feelings	Associate producer	2009
Nikki Amber	When I Look into Your Eyes	Composer	2009
Ray Manzarek/Roy Rogers	Ballads Before the Rain	Engineering, mixing	2008
Maria Muldaur	Yes We Can!	Producer, engineering, mixing, slide guitar, lap steel guitar	2008
Evelyn "Champagne" King	Open Book	Producing, mixing, mastering, keyboards	2007
Carlos Santana/Wayne Shorter	Live at Montreux	Audio post producer, surround mixing	2007
Kyle Lardner	Sail Among the Stars	Guitar, pedal steel	2007
Solis	Songs For Judah	Mixing	2007
Eddie Money	Wanna Go Back	Producer, engineering, mastering, pedal steel	2007
Maria Muldaur	Heart of Mine: Love Songs of Bob Dylan	Producer, engineering, lap steel guitar, e-bow, shaker, tambourine	2006
Idris Ackamoor	Music of Idris Ackamoor 1971 – 2004	Engineering, mixing	2006
Oxbow	Love That Lasts: A Wholly Hypographic and Disturbing Work by Oxbow	Mixing	2006
Umphrey's McGee	Safety in Numbers	Engineering	2006
Preston Glass	Street Corner Prophecy	Engineering, guitar (steel)	2006
Dominic Frasca	Deviations	Mastering	2005
Magic Christian	Magic Christian	Producer, engineering	2005
Beth Waters	Beth Waters	Mixing	2004
Those Darn Accordions!	Lawnball	Mixing, mastering, percussion	2004
Roy Rogers	Live! At the Sierra Nevada Brewery Big Room	Mixing, mastering	2004
Continuum	Mad About Tadd: The Compositions of Tadd Damerson	Mastering, restoration	2004
Brian Auger	Auger Rhythms: Brian Auger's Musical History	Mastering	2003
Gordon Stevens	Homecoming	Engineering	2003
Johnny Colla	Lucky Devil	Engineering	2003
Les DeMerle	On Fire	Restoration	2003
J. Thompson	Romantic Night	Digital editing	2003
Those Darn Accordions!	Amped	Engineering, mixing, mastering	2002
Stephen Dreyfuss	Broadway Blues	Mixing, mastering, guitar	2002
Dozie	Redemption	Guitar	2002
Slim	Interstate Medicine	Clapping	2002
Roy Rogers	Roots of our Nature	Engineering	2002
Huey Lewis and the News	Plan B	Engineer	2001
Ali-Ollie Woodson	Right Here All Along	Engineering, mixing	2001
Mitch Woods	Jump For Joy!	Engineer, producer	2001
Ringo Starr	Ringo Starr and his All Star Band – So Far	Audio post producer, surround mixer	2001
Jerry Joseph	Goodlandia	Lap steel guitar	2000
Shana Morrison	Caledonia	Mixing	1999
Those Darn Accordions!	Clownhead	Mixing, mastering	1999
Roy Rogers	Everybody's Angel	Mixing, engineering	1999
Can You Read This Boston?	Can You Read This Boston?	Producer	1999
Angela Strehli	Deja Blue	Engineering	1998
Far From Home	Like a Whisper	Producer, engineering, mixing, composer, guitar (electric/acoustic), slide guitar, pedal steel	1998
Terreiro de Sao Francisco	Vivendo de Pao	Engineering	1998
Adrianne	For Adeline	Engineer	1998
Nate Fox	Hittin' It From the Back	Mixing, guitar	1997
The Call	The Best of The Call	Engineering	1997
Katherine Chase	Truth	Engineering	1997
The Stylistics	Love is Back in Style	Engineering, associate producer, guitar (steel), percussion	1996
Huey Lewis and the News	Time Flies: The Best of Huey Lewis and the News	Engineering	1996
Fred Williamson	Tribute Songs	Mixing, associate producer	1996
Beggars	Beggars	Producer, Engineering	1995
Lenny Williams	Chill	Producer, engineering, mixing, vocals	1995
Kapono Beamer	Cruisin' on Hawaiian Time	Engineering	1995
Pamela Polland	Heart of the World	Engineer	1995
Kirk Franklin	Whatcha Lookin' 4	Engineering, overdubs	1995
Larry Tagg	With a Skeleton Crew	Engineering	1995
Michael Been	On the Verge of a Nervous Breakthrough	Engineering	1994
The Sneetches	Blow of the Sun	Engineering, associate producer	1994
A Tribute To Mark Heard	Strong Hand of Love	Engineering	1994
Peter Rowan	Awake Me in the New World	Engineer	1993
Gena Krupa	Hot Drums	Mastering, restoration	1993
The Count Five	The Psychotic Reunion Live!	Guitar, background vocals	1993
Buddy Guy/Junior Wells	Live at the Mystery Club	Mastering, restoration	1993
Dick Dale	Tribal Thunder	Engineering	1993
Maria Muldaur	On the Sunny Side	Engineering	1992
McCoy Tyner	Just Feelin'	Remastering, restoration	1991
Triple M	Triple M	Engineering, mixing, associate producer, guitar (electric)	1991
Zydeco Expressmen/Al Rapone	Speakerboxxx/The Love Below	Engineering	1990
A Fine & Private Place	A Musical Fantasy	Mixing, editing, mixing engineer	1989
Huey Lewis and the News	Small World	Background vocals	1988
Joe Satriani	Surfing with the Alien	Audio restoration	1987
Rocky Sullivan	Caught in the Crossfire	Guitar, synthesizer	1984
Jesse Barish	Jesse Barish	Pedal steel	1978
