= List of UK Jazz & Blues Albums Chart number ones of 2018 =

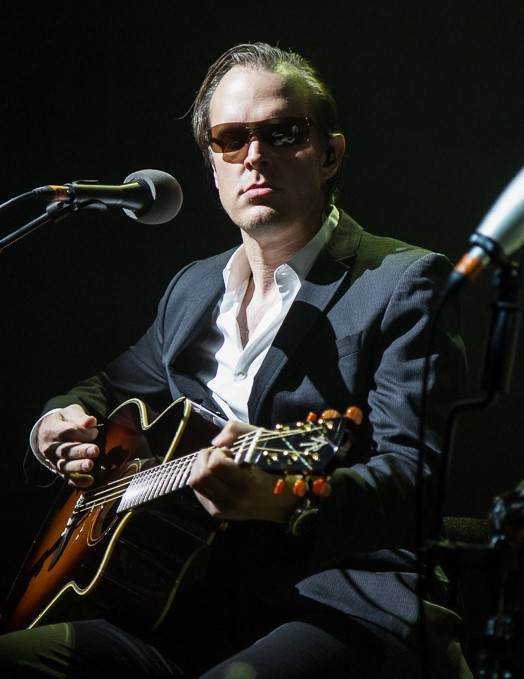
Joe Bonamassa spent a total of 11 weeks atop the UK Jazz & Blues Albums Chart in 2018: six with Black Coffee (with Beth Hart), four with Redemption and one with British Blues Explosion Live.

The UK Jazz & Blues Albums Chart is a record chart which ranks the best-selling jazz and blues albums in the United Kingdom. Compiled and published by the Official Charts Company, the data is based on each album's weekly physical sales, digital downloads and streams. In 2018, 52 charts were published with 27 albums at number one. The first number-one album of the year was Parking Lot Symphony by Trombone Shorty. The last number-one album of the year was The Prophet Speaks, the 40th studio album by Northern Irish singer-songwriter Van Morrison, which topped the last three charts of December.

The most successful album on the UK Jazz & Blues Albums Chart in 2018 was Black Coffee by Beth Hart and Joe Bonamassa, which spent six weeks at number one. Bonamassa also spent four weeks atop the chart with Redemption and another with British Blues Explosion Live. Van Morrison and Joey DeFrancesco spent four weeks atop the chart together with You're Driving Me Crazy (one week) and The Prophet Speaks (three weeks), as did John Coltrane with The Final Tour: The Bootleg Series, Vol. 6 (with Miles Davis – one week) and Both Directions at Once: The Lost Album (three weeks).

== Chart history ==
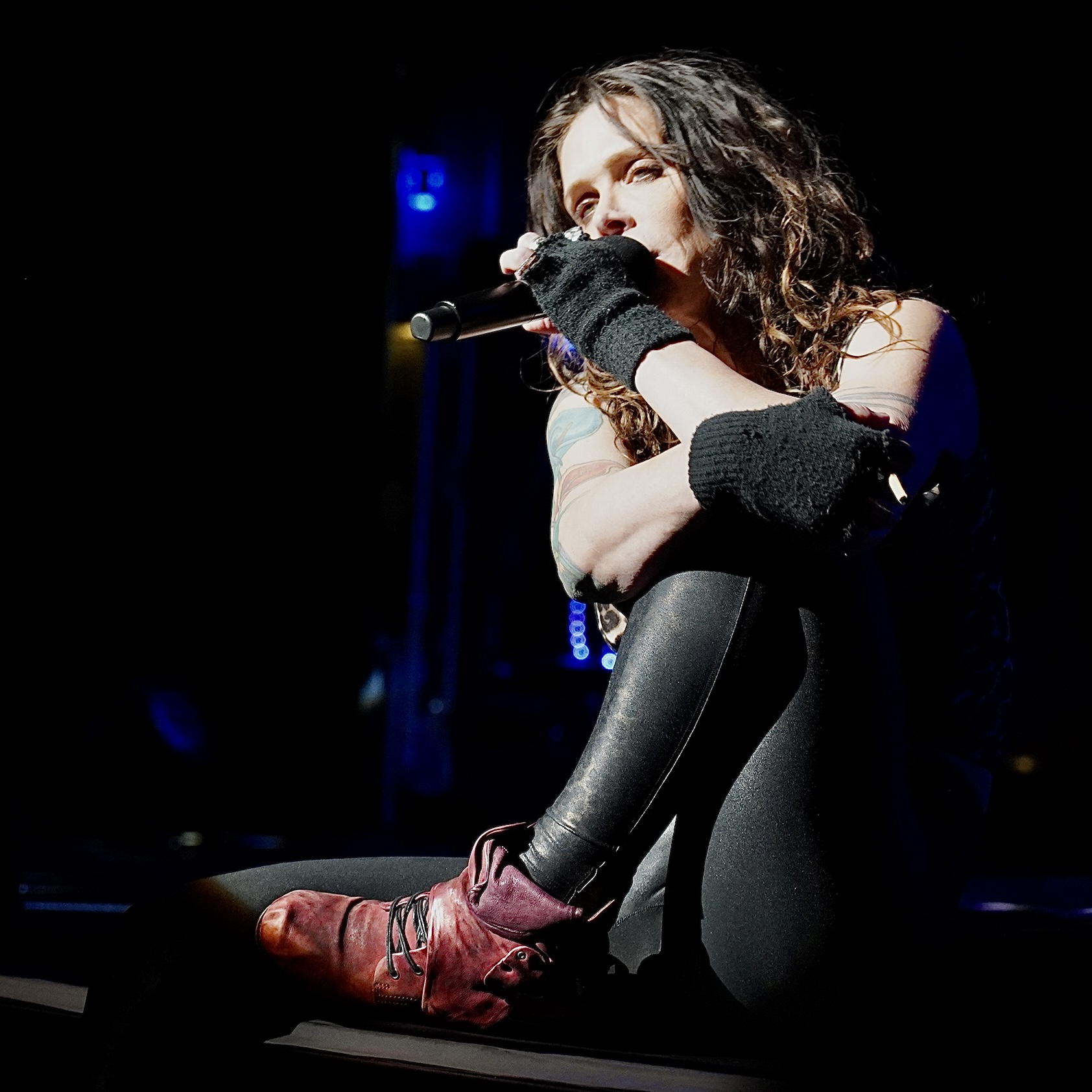
In addition to Black Coffee, Beth Hart also spent a week at number one with Front and Center: Live from New York.

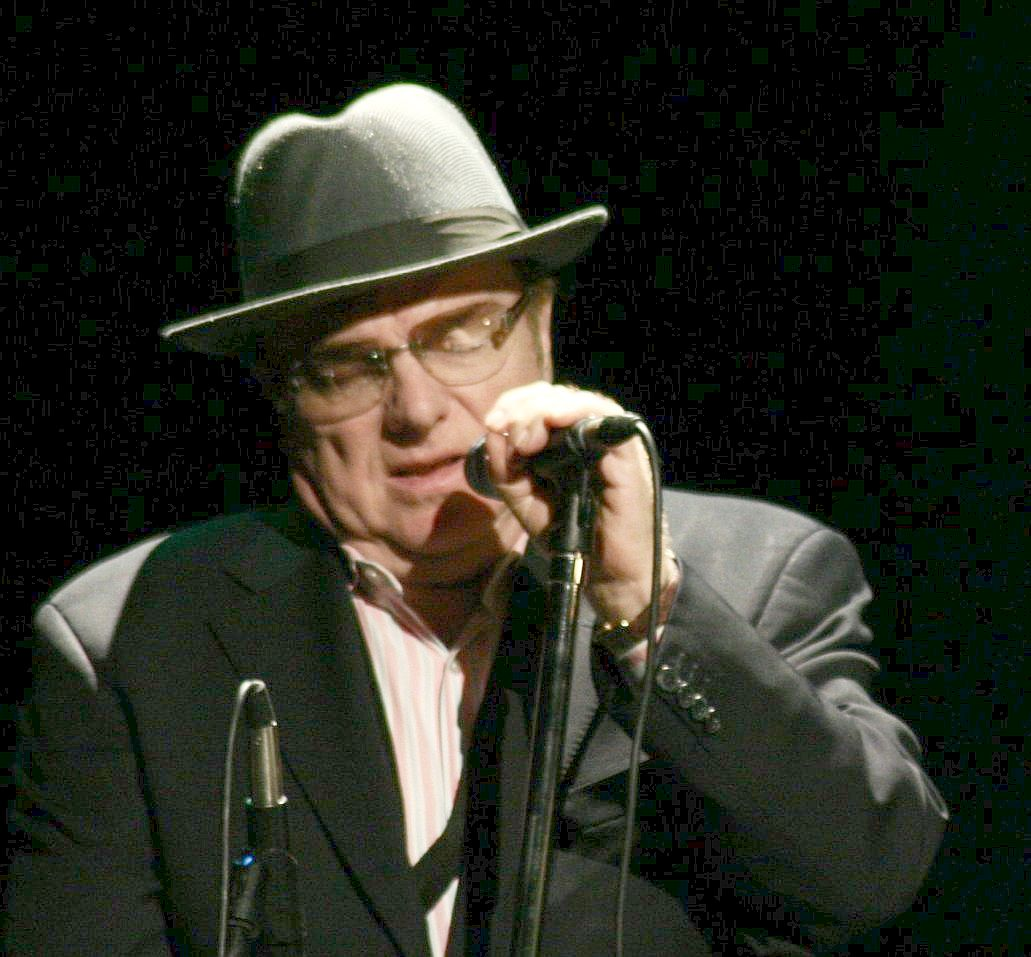
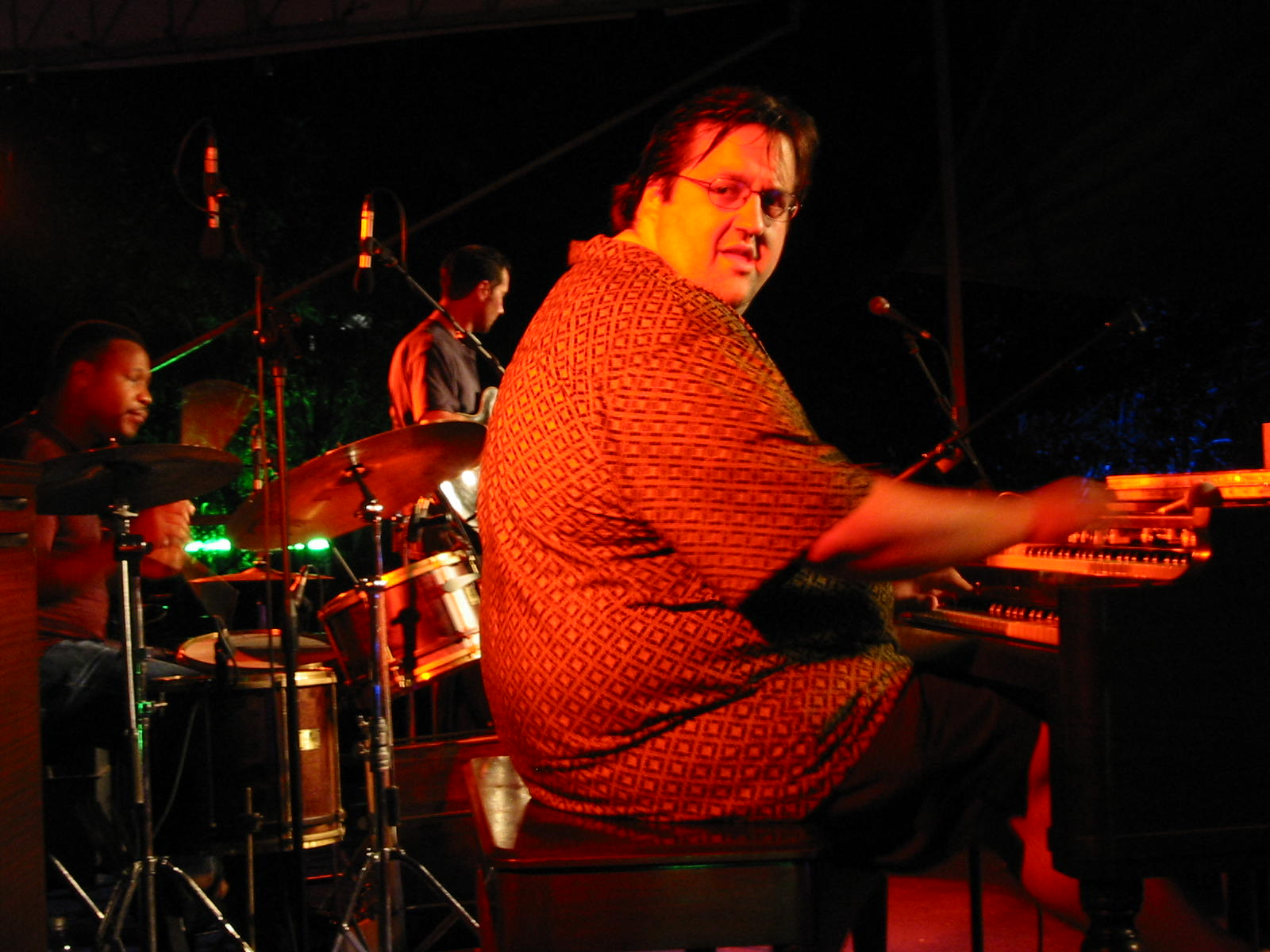
Van Morrison (top) and Joey DeFrancesco (bottom) spent four weeks atop the chart together with the albums You're Driving Me Crazy and The Prophet Speaks.

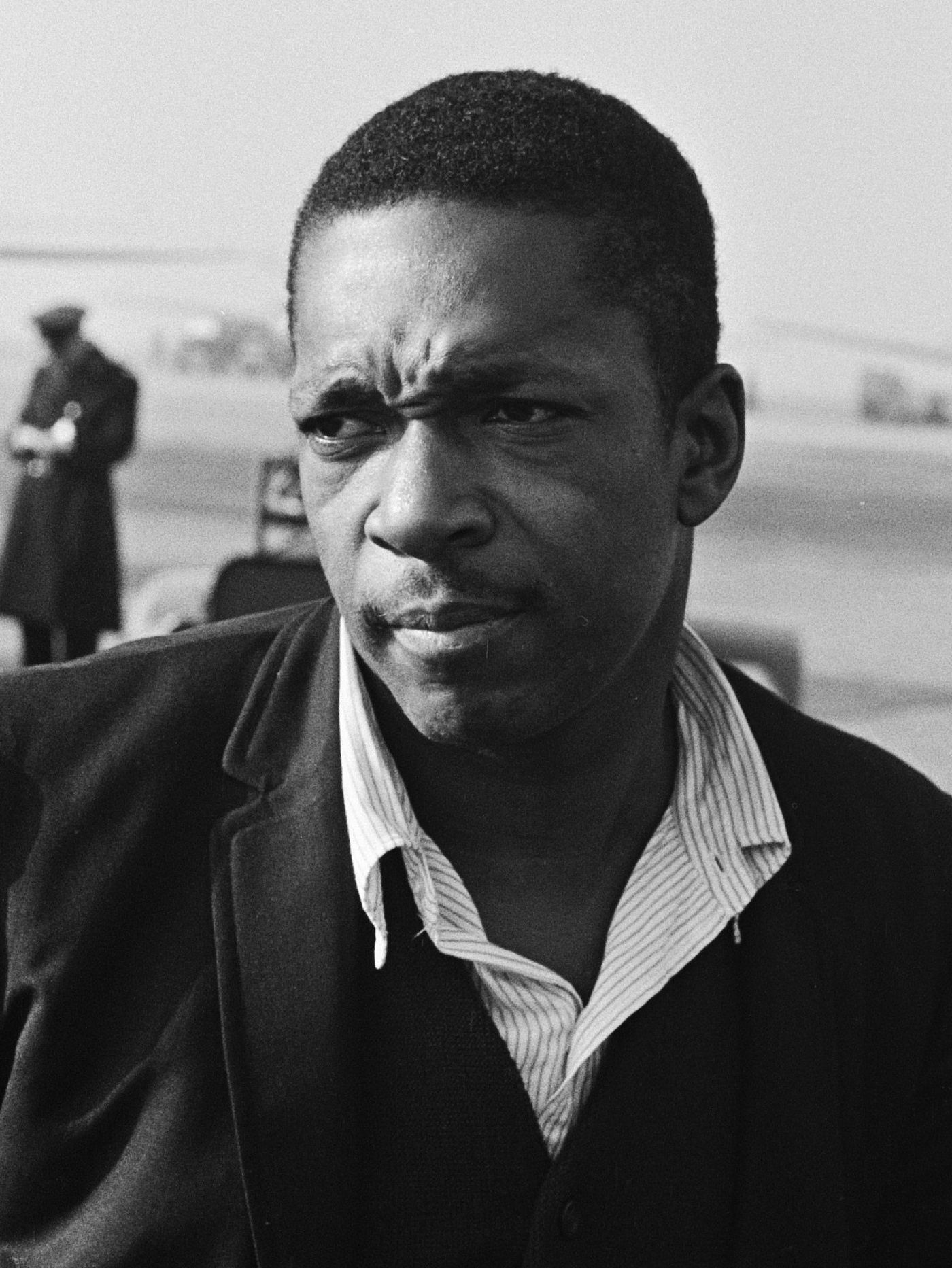
John Coltrane was also number one for four weeks with two albums: three with Both Directions at Once: The Lost Album and one with The Final Tour: The Bootleg Series, Vol. 6 (with Miles Davis).

Issue date	Album	Artist(s)	Record label(s)	Ref.
5 January	Parking Lot Symphony	Trombone Shorty	Blue Note	
12 January	Liquid Spirit	Gregory Porter	Blue Note	
19 January	Liquid Spirit	Gregory Porter	Blue Note	
26 January	Liquid Spirit	Gregory Porter	Blue Note	
2 February	Black Coffee	Beth Hart, Joe Bonamassa	Provogue	
9 February	Black Coffee	Beth Hart, Joe Bonamassa	Provogue	
16 February	A Humdrum Star	GoGo Penguin	Blue Note	
23 February	Black Coffee	Beth Hart, Joe Bonamassa	Provogue	
2 March	Black Coffee	Beth Hart, Joe Bonamassa	Provogue	
9 March	Black Coffee	Beth Hart, Joe Bonamassa	Provogue	
16 March	Black Coffee	Beth Hart, Joe Bonamassa	Provogue	
23 March	Irish Tour '74	Rory Gallagher	UMC	
30 March	The Final Tour: The Bootleg Series, Vol. 6	Miles Davis, John Coltrane	Sony	
6 April	Blue & Lonesome	The Rolling Stones	Polydor	
13 April	Blue & Lonesome	The Rolling Stones	Polydor	
20 April	Front and Center: Live from New York	Beth Hart	Provogue	
27 April	Blue & Lonesome	The Rolling Stones	Polydor	
4 May	You're Driving Me Crazy	Van Morrison, Joey DeFrancesco	Legacy	
11 May	The Kings & Queens of Swing	various artists	UMOD	
18 May	The Prodigal Son	Ry Cooder	Fantasy	
25 May	British Blues Explosion Live	Joe Bonamassa	Provogue	
1 June	The Return	Kamaal Williams	Warp	
8 June	Got the Blues	various artists	UMOD	
15 June	Now That's What I Call Jazz	various artists	Virgin/EMI/Sony	
22 June	Now That's What I Call Jazz	various artists	Virgin/EMI/Sony	
29 June	Heaven and Earth	Kamasi Washington	Young Turks	
6 July	Both Directions at Once: The Lost Album	John Coltrane	Impulse!	
13 July	Both Directions at Once: The Lost Album	John Coltrane	Impulse!	
20 July	Both Directions at Once: The Lost Album	John Coltrane	Impulse!	
27 July	Now That's What I Call Jazz	various artists	Virgin/EMI/Sony	
3 August	Now That's What I Call Jazz	various artists	Virgin/EMI/Sony	
10 August	Got the Blues	various artists	UMOD	
17 August	High Water I	The Magpie Salute	Provogue	
24 August	High Water I	The Magpie Salute	Provogue	
31 August	High Water I	The Magpie Salute	Provogue	
7 September	Anthem	Madeleine Peyroux	Decca	
14 September	Indigo	Kandace Springs	Blue Note	
21 September	Love Is Here to Stay	Tony Bennett, Diana Krall	Columbia/Verve	
28 September	Redemption	Joe Bonamassa	Provogue	
5 October	Can U Cook?	Seasick Steve	BMG	
12 October	Redemption	Joe Bonamassa	Provogue	
19 October	Redemption	Joe Bonamassa	Provogue	
26 October	Redemption	Joe Bonamassa	Provogue	
2 November	Can U Cook?	Seasick Steve	BMG	
9 November	Moore Blues for Gary	Bob Daisley & Friends	ear	
16 November	The Capitol Studios Sessions	Jeff Goldblum, The Mildred Snitzer Orchestra	Decca	
23 November	The Capitol Studios Sessions	Jeff Goldblum, The Mildred Snitzer Orchestra	Decca	
30 November	The Capitol Studios Sessions	Jeff Goldblum, The Mildred Snitzer Orchestra	Decca	
7 December	Bitter-Sweet	Bryan Ferry	BMG	
14 December	The Prophet Speaks	Van Morrison	Exile	
21 December	The Prophet Speaks	Van Morrison	Exile	
28 December	The Prophet Speaks	Van Morrison	Exile	

== See also ==
- 2018 in British music
