= Troy Roberts (musician) =

Australian-American saxophonist and composer

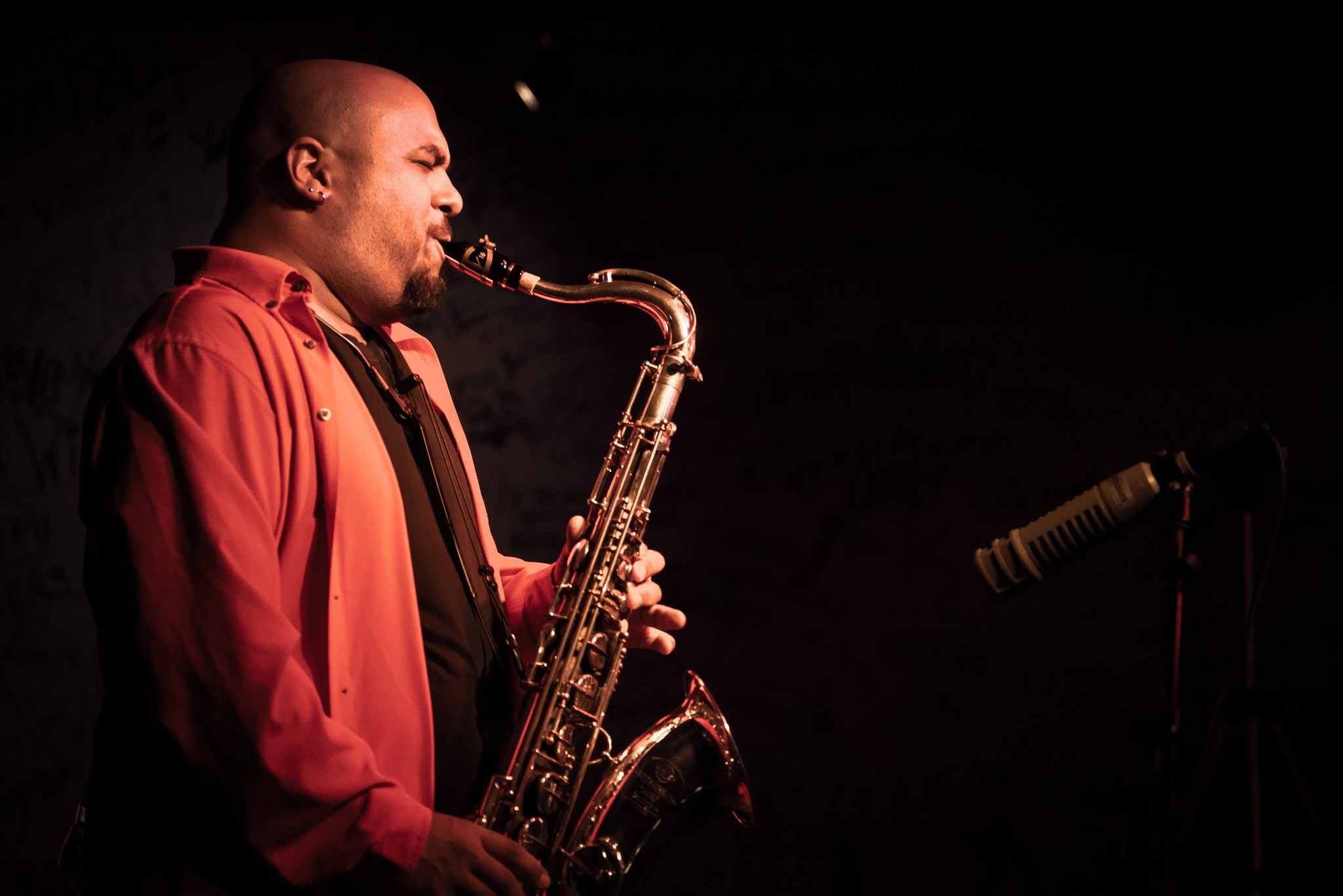

Background information
- Born: 1982 (age 43–44); Perth, West Australia, Australia
- Genres: Jazz, post-bop, jazz fusion, jazz groove
- Occupations: musician, composer, band leader, educator
- Instruments: tenor saxophone, soprano saxophone, alto saxophone, electric bass, acoustic bass
- Label: Toy Robot Music
- Website: troyroberts.com

Troy Roberts is an Australian-born jazz saxophonist, composer, and educator based in New York City. He is a three-time Grammy-nominated artist and has released sixteen albums as a bandleader. Roberts has performed and recorded with numerous prominent jazz musicians, including Joey DeFrancesco, Jeff "Tain" Watts, Kurt Elling, and Van Morrison.

== Early life and education ==
Roberts was born in Perth, Western Australia. He began his formal music education at the West Australian Academy of Performing Arts (WAAPA), where he was accepted at the age of 15. He completed a Bachelor of Music with honors in 2001. In 2007, Roberts earned a Master of Music degree from the University of Miami in the United States.

== Career ==
Roberts has established himself as a versatile saxophonist, known for his work across various jazz styles. He has been a member of ensembles led by Joey DeFrancesco, Jeff "Tain" Watts, and Orrin Evans' Captain Black Big Band. Roberts has also collaborated with artists such as Kurt Elling, Van Morrison, and Veronica Swift.

As a bandleader, Roberts has released sixteen albums, including Green Lights (2024), which features John Patitucci, Paul Bollenback, and Jimmy Macbride. His project Nu-Jive blends jazz with funk and fusion elements.

Roberts is also active as an educator, having served as an artist-in-residence and lecturer at institutions such as the University of Miami's Frost School of Music, the New School for Jazz and Contemporary Music, and the West Australian Academy of Performing Arts.

== Awards and recognition ==
- Three-time Grammy nominee for contributions to albums by Sammy Figueroa, Joey DeFrancesco, and Dan Pugach.
- Winner of the 2001 James Morrison Jazz Scholarship.
- Semi-finalist in the 2008 Thelonious Monk International Jazz Saxophone Competition.
- Second place in the 2016 Wangaratta International Saxophone Competition.
- Recipient of three consecutive DownBeat Jazz Soloist Awards.

== Discography ==
=== As Leader ===
- Green Lights (2024)
- Nu-Jive: Live at the Perth International Jazz Festival (2023)
- Nu-Jive: Nations United (2022)
- Best Buddies (2021)
- Stuff I Heard (2020)
- Days Like These (2019)
- Nu-Jive Perspective (2018)
- Tales & Tones (2017)
- Secret Rhymes (2015)
- Nu-Jive 5 (2013)
- Nu-Jive (2011)
- The XenDen Suite – Live DVD (2010)
- The XenDen Suite (2008)
- Soul Garbage (2006)
- VOID (2005)
- VOID: Live at The Llama Bar DVD (2004)

=== As Sideman ===
Roberts has appeared on over fifty recordings as a featured artist and sideman, including:

- Joey DeFrancesco's In the Key of the Universe (2019)
- Van Morrison's The Prophet Speaks (2018)
- Kurt Elling & James Morrison's Live in New York (2019)
- Orrin Evans' Presence (2018)
- Terraza Big Band's One Day Wonder (2019)
- Sammy Figueroa's The Magician (2007)
- Samuel Torres, A Dance For Birds (2025)
- Silvano Monasterios, The River (2025)
- Jackson Potter, Small Things (2024)
- Pat Bianchi, Three (2024)
- Robby Ameen, Live at The Poster Museum (2024)
- Dan Pugach Big Band, Bianca Reimagined (2024)
- The Birdland Big Band, Storybook (2024)
- Mikailo Kasha, Bloom, (2024)
- Austin McMahon, Things Are Looking Up (2023)
- Michael Davis – “Open City” (2023)
- Leon Foster Thomas – “Calasanitus” (2023)
- Tito Carrillo – “Urbanessence” (2022)
- Kristin Berardi – “The Light and The Dark” (2022)
- Jared Schonig – “Two Takes Vol. 2: Big Band” (2021)
- Nicole Henry – “A Time To Love Again” (2021)
- John Daversa – “All Without Words” (2021)
- Robby Ameen – “Diluvio” (2020)
- Orrin Evans – “The Intangible Between, feat. The Captain Black Big Band” (2020)
- Joey DeFrancesco – “In The Key Of The Universe” (2019)
- Kurt Elling & James Morrison – “Live In New York” (2019)
- Sarah McKenzie – “Secrets Of My Heart” (2019)
- Terraza Big Band – “One Day Wonder” (2019)
- Tim Stocker – “The View From Here” (2019)
- Orrin Evans & The Captain Black Big Band – “Presence” (2018)
- Van Morrison – “The Prophet Speaks” (2018)
- Van Morrison – “Your’re Driving Me Crazy” (2018)
- Giedrius Nakas – “No Fear, Full Of Love” (2018)
- Adison Evans – “Meridian” (2018)
- Joey DeFrancesco – “Project Freedom” (2017)
- Jared Hall – “Hallways” (2017)
- Berta Moreno – “Little Steps” (2017)
- Jeff ‘Tain’ Watts – “Blue Vol. 2” (2016)
- Silvano Monasterios – “Partly Sunny” (2016)
- Jeff ‘Tain’ Watts – “Wattify” (2016)
- Shareef Clayton – “North & South” (2016)
- Slippery Rock Univ. Jazz Ensemble feat. Troy Roberts – “Identity” (2016)
- Chad Bernstein – “Suite for 2nd Lieutenant” (2016)
- Jeff ‘Tain’ Watts – “Blue, Vol. 1” (2015)
- Robby Ameen – “Days In The Night” (2015)
- Sammy Figueroa – “Imaginary World” (2015)
- Sarah McKenzie – “We Could Be Lovers” (2015)
- Revive Music Presents, “Supreme Sonacy, Vol. 1” (2015)
- JC Stylles – “Blakey Grease” (2014)
- Rony Afif – “Zourouf” (2014)
- Daniel Strange – “Life As I Hear It” (2012)
- Gabriel Vivas – “Ninth Life” (2012)
- Silvano Monasterios – “Unconditional” (2011)
- Dave Grusin – “An Evening With Dave Grusin (CD & DVD)” (2010)
- Valeria Proano – “Retrato En Blanco Y Negro“(2010)
- John Trotter – “(Instructional DVD) The Working Drummer” (2010)
- Stephen Guerra Big Band – “Namesake” (2010)
- JazzWA – “Jazzaziz Vol 4.” (2009)
- James Morrison – “(DVD) On The Edge – Live at The Sydney Opera House” (2009)
- Johannes Luebbers Dectet “Make Some Noise” (2008)
- Jono McNeil – “Places” (2008)
- South Nine Ensemble – “The Llama” (2007)
- Sammy Figueroa – “The Magician” (2007)
- Alex Alberti – “Two Sides To Every Story” (2007)
- Jean Caze – “Miami Jazz Scene” (2006)
- JazzWA – “Jazzaziz Vol 2.” (2005)
- James Morrison – “(DVD) On The Edge, live in Germany” (2004)
- James Morrison – “On The Edge” (2003)
- Hip Mo Toast Big Band – “Mischievous Girl” (2003)
- Salamander – “Adapt” (2003)
- JazzWA – “Jazzaziz Vol 1.” (2002)
