= Francesco (disambiguation) =

Francesco is a given name.

Francesco may also refer to:

- Francesco (1989 film), a docu-drama about St. Francis of Assisi
- Francesco (2002 film), a drama film about St. Francis of Assisi
- Francesco (2020 film), a documentary about Pope Francis

== See also ==
- De Francesco
- Di Francesco
- San Francesco (disambiguation)
