= Studio D Recording =

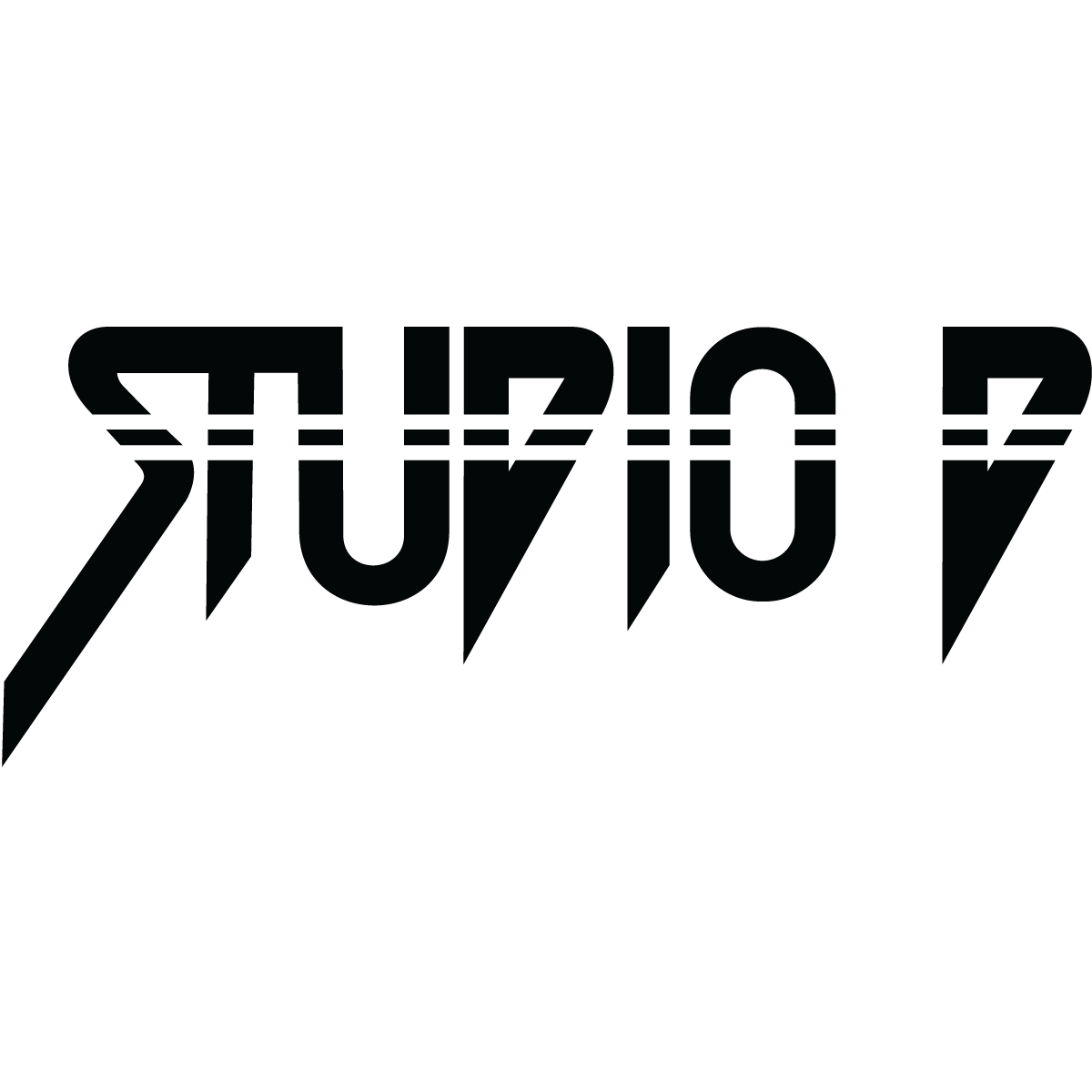

Studio D Recording, Inc. is a San Francisco Bay Area based recording, mixing, and mastering studio opened in 1984 in Sausalito. Studio D is most well known for its live room, equipped with a 20 foot ceiling and tunable acoustics. Studio D has been a major presence in the Bay Area's music scene since its inception, recording a number of multiplatinum and Grammy Award winning albums.

Artists having worked at Studio D include Soundgarden, Earth, Wind, & Fire, Faith No More, Aretha Franklin, Huey Lewis and the News, Eddie Money, Bruce Hornsby, Chris Isaak, Carlos Santana, Joe Satriani, Dick Dale, and Bonnie Raitt.

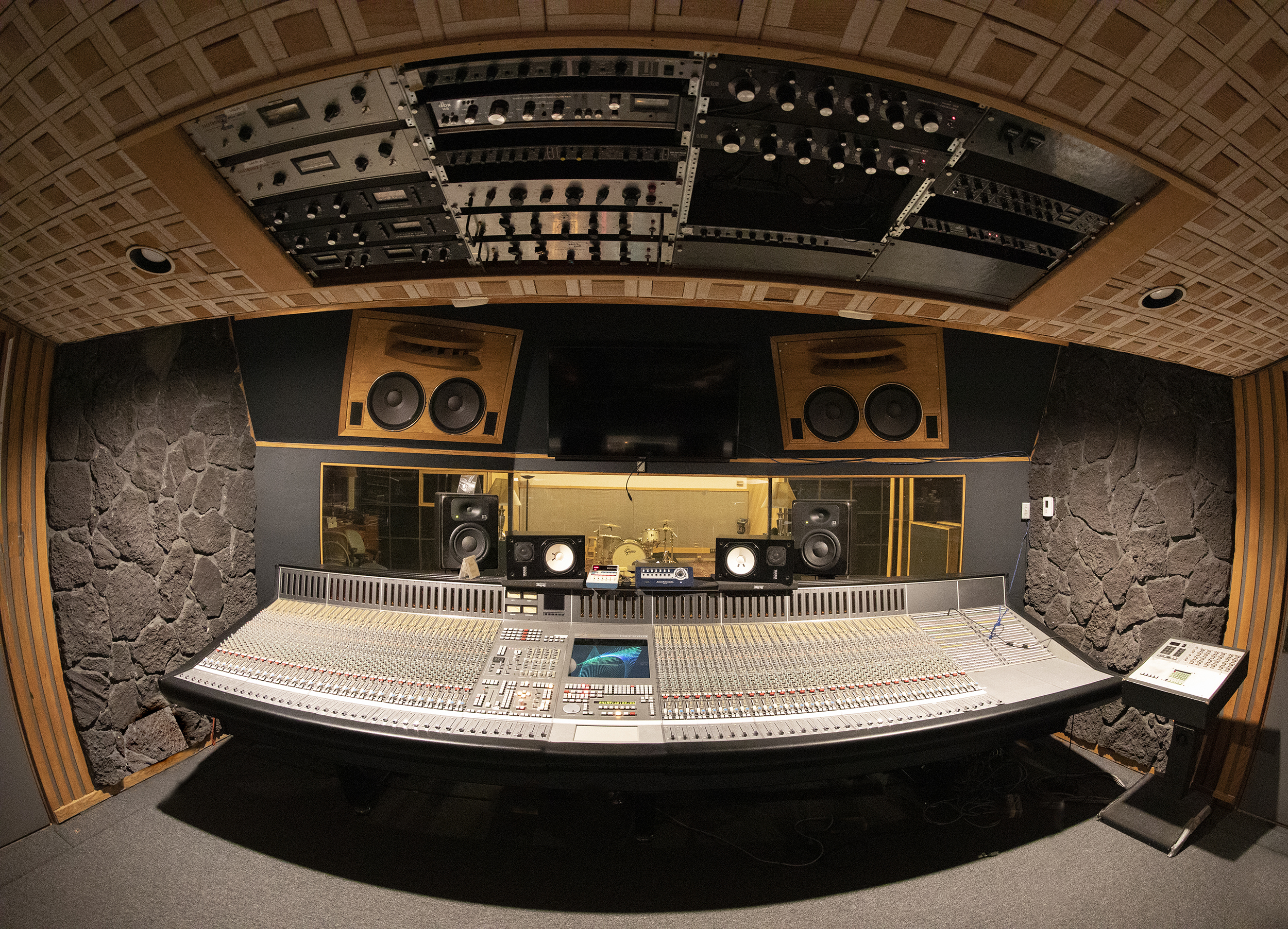
View from the control room, over Studio D's SSL 9000J console, out to the expansive live room.

== Selected List of Albums Recorded at Studio D ==
Some notable albums recorded and/or mixed at Studio D include:

- Aretha Franklin: Aretha 1986
- Huey Lewis and the News: Fore! 1986
- Bruce Hornsby and the Range: The Way It Is 1986
- Melvins: Gluey Porch Treatments 1986
- Earth, Wind & Fire: Touch the World 1987
- Pebbles: Pebbles 1987
- Faith No More: Introduce Yourself 1987
- Huey Lewis and the News: Small World 1988
- Faith No More: The Real Thing 1989
- Soundgarden: Badmotorfinger 1991
- Flipper: American Grafishy 1992
- Dick Dale: Tribal Thunder 1993
- Testament: Low 1994
- Chris Isaak: Forever Blue 1995
- Huey Lewis and the News: Time Flies... The Best of Huey Lewis & the News 1996
- The Verve Pipe: Villains 1996
- The Call: The Best of The Call 1997
- Bonnie Raitt: Souls Alike 2005
- Umphrey's McGee: Safety in Numbers 2006
- Eddie Money: Wanna Go Back 2007
- The Doobie Brothers: World Gone Crazy 2010
- Kenny Wayne Shepherd: How I Go 2011
- Ray Manzarek & Roy Rogers Twisted Tales 2013
- Exodus: Blood In, Blood Out 2015
- Van Morrison & Joey Defrancesco: You're Driving Me Crazy 2018
- Van Morrison & Joey Defrancesco: The Prophet Speaks 2018
- Sheryl Crow: Threads 2019
- Bonnie Raitt: Just Like That... 2022
