= De Francesco =

De Francesco (or de Francesco) is an Italian surname. Notable people with this surname include:

- Alberto De Francesco (born 1994), Italian football player
- Devlin DeFrancesco (born 2000), Canadian-Italian auto racing driver
- Francesco De Francesco (born 1977), Italian football striker
- Grete De Francesco (1893–1945), German-speaking writer
- Joey DeFrancesco (1971–2022), American jazz organist, trumpeter, saxophonist, and occasional singer
- John DeFrancesco (1940–2024), American jazz organist and vocalist
- Johnny DeFrancesco (born 1965), merican blues guitarist
- Lucas de Francesco (born 1981), Italian football striker
- Matteuccia de Francesco (died 1428), an alleged Italian witch and nun
- Roberto De Francesco (born 1964), Italian actor
- Sebastian DeFrancesco (1953–2023), American paralympic athlete and table tennis player
- Tony DeFrancesco (born 1963), American baseball coach

== See also ==
- Francesco
- Di Francesco
