= Cotino =

Cotino or Cotina may refer to:

- Cotino (community), a Storyliving by Disney community in Rancho Mirage, California
- Juan Cotino (1950 – 2020), a Spanish entrepreneur and politician
- Ćehotina, or Ćotina, a river in Montenegro and Bosnia and Herzegovina

== See also ==
- Contino, an Italian surname
- Cortina (disambiguation)
- Cortino, a town in Italy
- Cotinus, a genus of shrub
