= The Best of The Call =

Compilation album by The Call
- Released: July 8, 1997
- Genre: Rock
- Length: 59:17
- Label: Warner Resound
- Producer: Daniel Presley; Dan Russell; Don Smith; Barry Landis (exec.)

The Call chronology
Red Moon (1990)	The Best of The Call (1997)	To Heaven and Back (1997)

The Best of The Call is a compilation album released by American rock band The Call, released in the United States on July 8, 1997, by Warner Resound.

== Track listing ==
All tracks are written by Michael Been, except where noted.

The Best of The Call track listing
No.	Title	Writer(s)	Original album	Length
1.	"Let the Day Begin"		Let the Day Begin, 1989	3:51
2.	"Everywhere I Go"		Reconciled, 1986	4:19
3.	"I Still Believe (Great Design)"	Been; Jim Goodwin	Reconciled	5:32
4.	"I Don't Wanna"		Into the Woods, 1987	5:06
5.	"Memory"		Into the Woods	4:04
6.	"What's Happened to You"		Red Moon, 1990	4:11
7.	"You Were There"		Red Moon, 1990	4:01
8.	"Become America"		Previously unreleased	3:19
9.	"To Feel This Way"		On the Verge of a Nervous Breakthrough, 1994	5:59
10.	"Us"		On the Verge of a Nervous Breakthrough	3:45
11.	"All You Hold On To"	Been; Peter Hayes	Previously unreleased	3:19
12.	"We Know Too Much"	Mark Heard	Orphans of God, 1994	5:49
13.	"The Walls Came Down"		Modern Romans, 1983	3:40
14.	"Uncovered"	Been; Goodwin	Let the Day Begin, 1989	2:22

=== Notes ===
- Tracks 8–12 are performed solo by Michael Been.
- The Call versions of "Become America" and "All You Hold On To" were released later in 1997 on the album To Heaven and Back.

== Personnel ==
=== The Call ===
- Michael Been – Guitar, bass guitar, organ, lead vocals, producer
- Tom Ferrier – Guitar, backing vocals
- Scott Musick – Percussion, drums
- Jim Goodwin – Horn, keyboard, backing vocals, producer
- Greg Freeman – Bass guitar

=== Compilation personnel ===
- Dan Russell – Compilation producer
- Barry Landis – Executive producer
- Danny Horrid – Mastering
- Pat Johnson – Photography
- Thom Jurek – Liner notes
- Elvis Wilson – Design
- Bill Winn – Mastering

=== Additional personnel ===
- Bono – Backing vocals (6)
- Eli Braden – Guitar (9)
- Bruce Cockburn – Guitar (8, 11)
- Peter Gabriel – Backing vocals (2)
- Garth Hudson – Keyboard (13)
- Joel Jaffe – Sound engineer
- Jim Keltner – Drums (8, 11)
- Jim Kerr – Backing vocals (2)
- Jeremy Kunz – Guitar (9)
- Ralph Patlan – Guitar (10, 12); associate producer (12)
- Daniel Presley – Producer (8, 11)
- Don Smith – Producer (4, 5)

== Release history ==
Date	Label	Format	Catalog
1997	Warner Resound	CD, cassette	46488
2005	Warner Resound	CD	46488

== Reception ==
Professional ratings
Review scores
Source	Rating
Allmusic	4.5/5 stars
