= Nexus (Pat Martino album) =

Live album by Pat Martino
- Released: 2015
- Recorded: Mid-1990s
- Venue: The Tin Angel, Philadelphia, Pennsylvania
- Genre: Jazz
- Label: HighNote Records; HCD 7274

Pat Martino chronology
Young Guns (2014)	Nexus (2015)	Formidable (2017)

Nexus is a live album by jazz guitarist Pat Martino on which he is joined by keyboardist Jim Ridl. It was recorded during the mid-1990s at The Tin Angel in Philadelphia, Pennsylvania, and was released in 2015 by HighNote Records.

== Reception ==
Professional ratings
Review scores
Source	Rating
All About Jazz	4/5 stars

In a review for All About Jazz, Victor L. Schermer wrote: "Nexus is a 'collectors item' album recorded in an intimate setting where you can really hear the personalities of two musicians with unique styles in interaction. It pulls your heartstrings in ways that you feel with your best friends. In this day and age when so much around us is 'marketable,' shiny, and surface-y, it's a welcome gift." In a separate AAJ article, Ian Patterson commented: "what is crystal clear is the empathy between the two musicians... Martino's playing on up-tempo numbers... is fluid but focused, with the helter skelter speed of his early years slightly tempered... The balance between the duo is finely poised between support and coaxing, producing a dialogue that is warm, intuitive and engaging."

Brian Zimmerman, in an article for DownBeat, stated: "With Nexus... listeners get the rare opportunity to eavesdrop on an intimate dialog between two masters of their craft... Ridl and Martino have an effortless rapport. Though their styles are different... they are somehow the perfect match, individuals who combine to form a stronger, more vibrant whole... Nexus is a must-have album for any Martino fan, a musical conversation we’ll be talking about for years."

Jeff Tamarkin, writing for Jazz Times, remarked: "Martino wrings soulfulness, drama and fervor from his instrument; his facility is unquestionable but it's the glow to his playing that ultimately gets you."

Dusted Magazine's Derek Taylor wrote: "Representing the latest aural ore mined from HighNote's access to Martino's tape trove, this set is right on par with its archival predecessors in revealing another facet of the guitarist's prolific career."

In a review for JazzIz, Philip Booth stated that Martino and Ridl are "musically simpatico, clearly attuned to one another's approach, and Ridl's somewhat brighter sound complements Martino's warm tones. Both are gifted improvisers, too, and each knows how to accompany in an urgent, inventive manner that pushes the other to greater musical heights."

== Track listing ==
1. "Recollection" (Martino) – 7:36
2. "Tenetree" (Ridl) – 4:39
3. "Sun on my Hands" (Ridl) – 7:09
4. "The Phineas Trane" (Harold Mabern) – 7:56
5. "Country Road" (Martino) – 5:02
6. "Interchange" (Martino) – 8:27
7. "Oleo" (Sonny Rollins) – 9:27
8. "Naima" (John Coltrane) – 4:52

== Personnel ==
- Pat Martino – guitar
- Jim Ridl – keyboards
