= Pat Bianchi =

American jazz organist

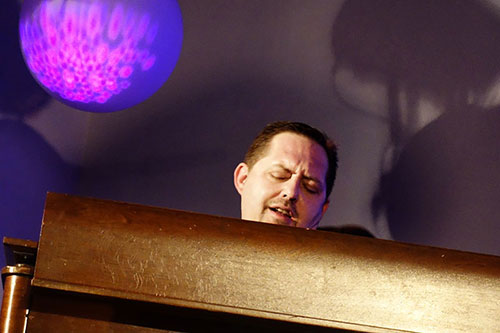

Background information
- Born: December 7, 1975 (age 50); Rochester, New York
- Genre: Jazz
- Occupation: Musician
- Instrument: Hammond organ
- Labels: 21H, Savant/Highnote Records, Capri
- Website: patbianchi.com

Patrick Richard Bianchi is an American jazz organist from New York, known for playing the Hammond B-3 organ.

== Career ==
An ambassador of the Hammond B3, organist Pat Bianchi demonstrates a knowledge of jazz-organ history yet draws from a range of other musical influences.

To date Bianchi has 9 CD releases as a leader, extensive tours throughout the United States and Europe, appearances at numerous jazz festivals and most recently opening for Steely Dan for 3 consecutive east coast tours. In addition to being a bandleader, Bianchi has appeared as a guest on over 30 recordings. The award-winning organist has also enjoyed tenured membership in the bands of revered artists in jazz including; Pat Martino, Lou Donaldson, Ralph Peterson Jr. and Chuck Loeb.

With additional performance credits which include: Red Holloway, George Coleman, Terrace Martin, Mark Whitfield, Roy Ayers, Terell Stafford, Dakota Staton, Javon Jackson, Tim Warfield and Alvin Queen among many others, Bianchi continues to be in high demand.

Born in Rochester New York, Bianchi hails from a musically gifted family. He began playing organ at the age of 7 and was playing his first professional gigs by the age of 11. In grade school he was enrolled at The Eastman School of Music’s preparatory program for piano and music theory while at the same time, being mentored by numerous musicians in the Rochester music scene. Upon graduation from Berklee, Bianchi relocated to Denver, CO where he further honed his skill as musician.

While maintaining an active performance schedule, Bianchi also teaches jazz organ at Berklee College of Music. He has been an integral co-author of curriculum for one of the first Hammond organ programs and official majors offered by an institution of higher education.

=== As leader ===
- The Art of the Jazz Organ Trio (Synergy Music, 2002)
- 3osity (Capri, 2006)
- East Coast Roots (Jazzed Media, 2006)
- Back Home (Doodlin', 2010)
- Crazy (Cellar Live, 2012)
- A Higher Standard (21H, 2015)
- In the Moment (Savant, 2018)
- Something To Say: The Music of Stevie Wonder (Savant, 2021)
- Three (21H, 2024)
- Confluence (Self Produced, 2026) with Colin Stranahan drums and Troy Roberts sax

=== As sideman ===
- Ed Cherry – It's All Good (Posi-Tone, 2012)
- Joey DeFrancesco – Never Can Say Goodbye (HighNote, 2010)
- Chuck Loeb – Plain 'n' Simple (Tweety, 2011)
- Pat Martino – Formidable (HighNote, 2017)
- Ralph Peterson – The Unity Project: Outer Reaches (Onyx, 2010)
- JC Stylles – Exhilaration and Other States (Motéma, 2011)
- Tim Warfield – A Sentimental Journey (Criss Cross, 2010)
- Tim Warfield - Jazzland (Criss Cross, 2018)
