= JC Stylles =

- Born: Jason Campbell; 7 October; Kuranda, Queensland, Australia
- Origin: Sydney, New South Wales, Australia
- Genres: Jazz
- Occupation: Musician
- Instrument: Guitar
- Years active: 1990s–present
- Label: Motéma
- Website: jcstylles.com

JC Stylles is the performing name of jazz guitarist Jason Campbell (he took the name to avoid confusion with Jason Campbell of the NFL), an Australian based in New York City since 2005 (as well as from 1992 to the mid-1990s). He studied with John Abercrombie, Tal Farlow, Johnny Griffin, Barry Harris, Rodney Jones, Pat Martino, John Scofield, Woody Shaw, and Miroslav Vitous. He plays in the organ trio format with musicians such as Pat Bianchi, Joey DeFrancesco, Jimmy McGriff, Tony Monaco, Lonnie Smith, and Akiko Tsuruga.

He has performed at the American Legion Post, The Apollo Theater, Bar Next Door, Cachaca Jazz Club, Carnegie Club, Charlie O's, Creole's, The Essex House, Fat Cat, Minton's Playhouse, Perks, Rue 57, Showmans, Smalls Jazz Club, Smoke, Swing 46, Lenox Lounge, La Martinique, Zinc Bar, and Trumpets Jazz Club.

== Discography ==
- Chillin' at Home (2007)
- Live & Unveiled (2009)
- Exhilaration and Other States (Motéma, 2011)
- Blakey Grease (American Showplace Music, 2014)
