= Formidable (Pat Martino album) =

Studio album by Pat Martino
- Released: 2017
- Recorded: April 17–19, 2017
- Studio: Jankland Recording, Wall Township, New Jersey
- Genre: Jazz
- Label: HighNote Records; HCD 7307
- Producer: Joseph Donofrio, Pat Martino

Pat Martino chronology
| Nexus (2015) | Formidable (2017) |

Formidable is an album by jazz guitarist Pat Martino. Formidable is the last full-length album released by Martino before his death in 2021. It was recorded in April 2017 at Jankland Recording in Wall Township, New Jersey, and was released by HighNote Records later that year. On the album, Martino is joined by saxophonist Adam Niewood, trumpeter Alex Norris, organist Pat Bianchi, and drummer Carmen Intorre Jr.

== Reception ==
Professional ratings
Review scores
| Source | Rating |
|---|---|
| DownBeat | 4/5 stars |
| The Guardian | 4/5 stars |
| All About Jazz | 4/5 stars |

In a review for DownBeat, Bobby Reed wrote: "Among the aspects that make this album a keeper are a sturdy commitment to swing, and the generosity of a leader who lets his gifted accompanists stretch out with solos. A couple of ballads... are performed in a trio setting, showcasing Martino's mastery of tempo and illustrating that a smoldering flame can be just as hot as a raging inferno."

Writing for The Guardian, John Fordham remarked: "Pat Martino has the... reputation of being a guitarists' guitarist, on account of his speed, accuracy and creamy-smooth tone. But along with these virtues comes a toughness and bite that derive from his early years in the funky organ combos of Jimmy McGriff, Jack McDuff et al. This album harks back somewhat to those days... the poised and unflappable Martino still manages to dominate the proceedings, turning a good session into something a bit special."

Jazz Times writer Dan Bilawsky called the group "a band once earthy and sophisticated, ably delivering a beautifully ecumenical program that acknowledges standards, Martino's back catalog and composers deserving of recognition."

In a review for All About Jazz, Victor L. Schermer commented: "Martino's playing is, as always, impeccable and at times stunning, but here he places himself squarely in the context of his quintet... this album is leonine, not so much as a frontal attack as a work of consummate artistry on the part of Martino and his group. It recapitulates what has gone before but with a sense of a new dawn." In a separate AAJ article, Ian Patterson noted that Martino's "playing seems much more invested in conjuring mood and feeling than in any extravagant displays of technique."

== Track listing ==
1. "El Niño" (Joey Calderazzo) – 7:07
2. "Hipsippy Blues" (Hank Mobley) – 6:58
3. "Homage" (Gerry Niewood) – 9:12
4. "Duke Ellington's Sound of Love" (Charles Mingus) – 7:54
5. "El Hombre" (Martino) – 7:02
6. "In Your Own Sweet Way" (Dave Brubeck) – 8:16
7. "Nightwings" (Martino) – Martino
8. "In a Sentimental Mood" (Duke Ellington) – 9:34
9. "On the Stairs" (Martino) – 6:25

== Personnel ==
- Pat Martino – guitar
- Pat Bianchi – organ
- Carmen Intorre Jr. – drums
- Adam Niewood – tenor saxophone (tracks 1, 2, 3, 5, 7, and 9)
- Alex Norris – trumpet (tracks 1, 3, 5, 7, and 9), flugelhorn (track 2)
