= Never Can Say Goodbye: The Music of Michael Jackson =

2010 studio album by Joey DeFrancesco

Studio album by Joey DeFrancesco
- Released: September 14, 2010
- Recorded: June 5–6, 2010
- Genre: Jazz
- Length: 59:24
- Label: HighNote
- Producer: Glenn Ferracone, Joey DeFrancesco

Joey DeFrancesco chronology
One Take, Vol. 4 (2010)	Never Can Say Goodbye: The Music of Michael Jackson (2010)

Never Can Say Goodbye: The Music of Michael Jackson is an album by jazz organist Joey DeFrancesco, a tribute to deceased entertainer Michael Jackson. The album was released in 2010 on HighNote Records and was produced by DeFrancesco and Glenn Ferracone. It was nominated for the 2011 Grammy Award for Best Contemporary Jazz Album.

== Overview ==
This album is one of several tribute albums released by DeFrancesco; in 2002 he paid tribute to fellow Philadelphian Don Patterson, plus Jimmy Smith in 1999, Frank Sinatra in 2004 and Horace Silver in 2009.

Along with DeFrancesco on various organs, and trumpet on "Beat It", the band consists of Paul Bollenback on guitars, Byron Landham on drums, Pat Bianchi on keyboards, and percussionist Carmen Intorre.

The album was nominated for the 2011 Grammy Award for Best Contemporary Jazz Album but lost to the Stanley Clarke album The Stanley Clarke Band.

== Critical reception ==
Professional ratings
Review scores
Source	Rating
AllMusic	3.5/5 stars
The Buffalo News	3.5/5 stars
The Philadelphia Inquirer	3.5/5 stars
All About Jazz	3.5/5 stars

Glen Astarita of All About Jazz gave the album a positive review writing that it "renders a happy medium by jazzing up the [Michael Jackson] songbook...with jazz, funk and rock stylizations, while retaining its inherent components" and calls it a "tunefully upbeat program".

Jeff Tamarkin commented in AllMusic that the tracks "depart from [the originals] substantially enough that they never feel like copies" and that "some of these tracks...seriously rock". He also praised guitarist Paul Bollenback, proclaiming him to be "on fire".

Jeff Simon wrote a mixed review for The Buffalo News. He lamented that Jackson's "music isn’t nearly as adaptable to chitlin circuit Hammond B-3 wails and screams and staccato stabs as you might assume" and the songs "are just a little too pretty for this kind of organ funk". He also poked fun at DeFrancesco's attempt to recreate Vincent Price's narration on "Thriller", quipping that it makes "you want to moonwalk all over his head". He did praise Bollenback's guitar playing, writing "you’d have to be made of granite not to enjoy the heck out of it" and closes his review by calling the album "great jazz fun".

Karl Stark wrote in The Philadelphia Inquirer that DeFrancisco takes "a few commercial layers off [Jackson's songs] and appl[ies] some verve from a jazz-soul point of view". He did complain that "Rock with You" is "pretty commercial" but did praise the drumming of Byron Landham writing that he "really rocks the house".

== Track listing ==
1. "Thriller" (Rod Temperton) 7:47
2. "Never Can Say Goodbye" (Clifton Davis) 5:52
3. "Beat It" (Michael Jackson) 7:12
4. "Human Nature" (John Bettis, Steve Porcaro) 5:03
5. "Rock with You" (Temperton) 6:30
6. "She's Out of My Life" (Tom Bahler) 6:43
7. "The Way You Make Me Feel" (Jackson) 4:55
8. "Lady in My Life" (Temperton) 5:36
9. "Billie Jean" (Jackson) 9:46

== Personnel ==
- Joey DeFrancesco – Numa organ, KeyB Duo organ, Numa piano, Hammond organ, trumpet, producer, vocals
- Paul Bollenback – electric guitar, nylon guitar
- Byron Landham – drums
- Pat Bianchi – keyboards
- Carmen Intorre – percussion
- Samantha Aurelio – backing vocals
- Ann Fontinella – violin
- Annie Sciola – backing vocals

Technical

- Glenn Ferracone – producer, engineer, mastering, mixing
- Joe Fields – executive producer
- Mark Reynolds – sound effects
- R. Andrew Lepley – cover photo
