= One for Rudy =

Studio album by Joey DeFrancesco
- Released: September 24, 2013
- Recorded: June 24, 2013
- Studio: Van Gelder Studio, Englewood Cliffs, NJ
- Genre: Jazz
- Length: 59:13
- Label: HighNote; HCD 7256
- Producer: Joey DeFrancesco

Joey DeFrancesco chronology
| Wonderful! Wonderful! (2012) | One for Rudy (2013) | Trip Mode (2015) |

One for Rudy is an album by organist Joey DeFrancesco which was recorded in 2013 and released on the HighNote label.

== Reception ==
Professional ratings
Review scores
| Source | Rating |
|---|---|
| All About Jazz | 4/5 stars |

In a review for the All About Jazz website Jack Bowers observed: "Even though DeFrancesco's name is on the marquee, this is clearly a group effort in which everyone plays an essential role. Needless to say, the recording itself is first-class, playing time respectable at just under an hour. For fans of organ trios in general and Joey DeFrancesco in particular, a charming and readily endorsed session". In JazzTimes, Owen Cordle wrote: "The organist recorded his second album at Van Gelder’s famous Englewood Cliffs, N.J., studio in 1990 and another album there eight years later. Now comes this tribute, with DeFrancesco’s trio reprising several tunes originally recorded by Van Gelder ... By focusing on Van Gelder’s work, DeFrancesco gives this album a worthy theme and artful purpose".

== Track listing ==
1. "I Don't Wanna Be Kissed" (Jack Elliot, Harold Spina) – 3:15
2. "Budo" (Miles Davis) – 4:43
3. "Goodbye" (Gordon Jenkins) – 5:24
4. "Canadian Sunset" (Eddie Heywood, Norman Gimbel) – 7:29
5. "Up Jumped Spring" (Freddie Hubbard) – 8:17
6. "Way Out West" (Sonny Rollins) – 5:56
7. "After You've Gone" (Turner Layton, Henry Creamer) – 4:44
8. "Monk's Dream" (Thelonious Monk) – 6:01
9. "Stardust" (Hoagy Carmichael, Mitchell Parish) – 7:46
10. "One for Rudy" (Joey DeFrancesco) – 5:38

== Personnel ==
- Joey DeFrancesco – Hammond B3
- Steve Cotter – guitar
- Ramond Banda – drums
