= You're Driving Me Crazy (album) =

Studio album by Van Morrison and Joey DeFrancesco
- Released: April 27, 2018
- Recorded: 2018
- Studio: Studio D (Sausalito, California)
- Genre: Jazz
- Length: 71:00
- Label: Sony Legacy
- Producers: Van Morrison, Joey DeFrancesco

Van Morrison chronology
Versatile (2017)	You're Driving Me Crazy (2018)	The Prophet Speaks (2018)

Joey DeFrancesco chronology
Project Freedom (2017)	You're Driving Me Crazy (2018)	In the Key of the Universe (2019)

Professional ratings
Aggregate scores
Source	Rating
Metacritic	75/100
Review scores
Source	Rating
AllMusic	4/5 stars
Pitchfork	7/10

You're Driving Me Crazy is the 39th studio album by Irish musician Van Morrison, his first in collaboration with American jazz organist & trumpeter Joey DeFrancesco. His third album in just seven months, and released on 27 April 2018 by Sony Legacy, it reached the Top 20 in the UK, and features Morrison's daughter, Shana.

== Critical reception ==
Pitchfork found that the album "captures the joy of making music", and praises "Joey DeFrancesco’s hard-driving soul-jazz combo". It notes approvingly that "the quintet knocked out the album in a couple of days, just like acts used to do in the mid-20th-century heyday of Blue Note and Prestige". DeFrancesco is "an ideal foil for Morrison. Respectful but impish", it finds. "Van Morrison continues to prove he’s among the hardest-working vocalists in jazz and its adjacent musical territories", DownBeat concludes. The albums sees Morrison "varying pace and mood to supreme effect", with "DeFrancesco creating a vortex of colliding lines" on the track “Evening Shadows”.

== Track listing ==
Original artist is Van Morrison except where noted.

No.	Title	Original artist	Length
1.	"Miss Otis Regrets"	Cole Porter	5:15
2.	"Hold It Right There"	Clark Terry; William Grey; Eddie "Cleanhead" Vinson	4:08
3.	"All Saints Day"		3:05
4.	"The Way Young Lovers Do"		4:13
5.	"The Things That I Used to Do"	Guitar Slim	5:56
6.	"Travellin' Light"	Trummy Young; Jimmy Mundy; Johnny Mercer	4:18
7.	"Close Enough for Jazz"		4:44
8.	"Goldfish Bowl"		7:05
9.	"Evening Shadows"	Van Morrison; Acker Bilk	3:21
10.	"Magic Time"		5:13
11.	"You're Driving Me Crazy"	Walter Donaldson	4:46
12.	"Every Day I Have the Blues"	Peter Chatman	5:38
13.	"Have I Told You Lately"		4:52
14.	"Sticks and Stones"	Titus Turner	2:46
15.	"Celtic Swing"		5:15

== Personnel ==
- Van Morrison – vocals, alto saxophone, harmonica
- Joey DeFrancesco – Hammond organ, keyboards, trumpet, backing vocals
- Dan Wilson – guitar
- Michael Ode – drums, percussion
- Troy Roberts – tenor saxophone, soprano saxophone
- Shana Morrison – backing vocals on "Hold It Right There" and "Have I Told You Lately"

== Charts ==
Chart (2018)	Peak position
Australian Albums (ARIA)	54
Austrian Albums (Ö3 Austria)	11
Belgian Albums (Ultratop Flanders)	35
Belgian Albums (Ultratop Wallonia)	167
Canadian Albums (Billboard)	100
Dutch Albums (Album Top 100)	29
German Albums (Offizielle Top 100)	10
Irish Albums (IRMA)	39
Italian Albums (FIMI)	62
New Zealand Heatseeker Albums (RMNZ)	1
Scottish Albums (Official Charts)	11
Spanish Albums (PROMUSICAE)	6
Swiss Albums (Schweizer Hitparade)	41
UK Albums (Official Charts)	20
US Billboard 200	76
