= Wonderful! Wonderful! (album) =

Studio album by Joey DeFrancesco
- Released: July 17, 2012
- Recorded: March 22, 2012
- Studio: Van Gelder Studio, Englewood Cliffs, NJ
- Genre: Jazz
- Length: 58:15
- Label: HighNote; HCD 7241
- Producer: Joey DeFrancesco, Don Sickler

Joey DeFrancesco chronology
40 (2011)	Wonderful! Wonderful! (2012)	One for Rudy (2013)

Wonderful! Wonderful! is an album by organist Joey DeFrancesco which was recorded in 2012 and released on the HighNote label.

== Reception ==
Professional ratings
Review scores
Source	Rating
All About Jazz	3.5/5 stars

On All About Jazz, Dan Bilawski noted "This date is essentially a blowing session with solos aplenty, but these guys never phone it in. They clearly delight in exploring the material, playing off one another and, in the case of DeFrancesco and Coryell, letting their envious chops off the leash". In JazzTimes, Bill Milkowski wrote: "It’s an inspired pairing with results ranging from sublime to positively pyrotechnic".

== Track listing ==
1. "Wonderful! Wonderful!" (Sherman Edwards, Ben Raleigh) – 7:07
2. "Five Spot After Dark" (Benny Golson) – 6:01
3. "Wagon Wheels" (Billy Hill, Peter DeRose) – 8:47
4. "Solitude" (Duke Ellington, Eddie DeLange, Irving Mills) – 7:12
5. "Joey D" (Larry Coryell) – 8:49
6. "Love Letters" (Victor Young, Edward Heyman) – 6:36
7. "Old Folks" (Willard Robison, Dedette Lee Hill) – 5:22
8. "JLJ Blues" (Joey DeFrancesco) – 8:21

== Personnel ==
- Joey DeFrancesco – Hammond B3, trumpet
- Larry Coryell – guitar
- Jimmy Cobb – drums
