= Let the Day Begin =

Studio album by American band, the Call

Studio album by The Call
- Released: 1989
- Studio: The Complex, Los Angeles; American Recording Studios, Woodland Hills, California; Power Station, New York City
- Label: MCA
- Producer: Michael Been, Jim Goodwin

The Call chronology
Into the Woods (1987)	Let the Day Begin (1989)	Red Moon (1990)

Singles from Album
- 1. "Let the Day Begin" Released: 1989; 2. "You Run" Released: 1989

Let the Day Begin is an album by the American band the Call, released in 1989. The band's former label, Elektra Records, declined to release the album.

The album peaked at No. 64 on the Billboard 200. The title track peaked at No. 42 on the UK Singles Chart. The band promoted the album by touring with the Peregrins. Let the Day Begin has sold more than 300,000 copies.

The title track climbed the charts, but, because MCA elected to switch pressing plants, there were no singles in stores. According to Michael Been: "There wasn't any foul play, though. It was just that MCA was switching over pressing plants, and they hadn't printed up enough copies of the single—only 100,000, I think. And the record went to number one, and all of a sudden, there weren't any in the stores—they'd all been sold. It took five weeks for the company to be able to get back to the point where they could start printing copies again, and in those five weeks, well—you live or die in this business."

The title track was used as a campaign theme song for Al Gore's 2000 Presidential Campaign.

== Production ==
Recorded in six days with minimal overdubs, the album was produced by bandmembers Michael Been and Jim Goodwin. The Call did not use headphones in the studio, instead choosing to set up a PA system.

"Watch" was cowritten by Been and the actor Harry Dean Stanton; the two met while filming The Last Temptation of Christ.

== Critical reception ==
Professional ratings
Review scores
Source	Rating
AllMusic	4/5 stars
The Encyclopedia of Popular Music	3/5 stars

The Washington Post concluded that "because Let the Day Begin was recorded with a minimum of fuss to capture what the band sounds like in concert, the rousing title track, the cautionary guitar-laced tale 'You Run', the Doors-like 'For Love' and the lovesick 'Surrender' possess a rhythmic kick lacking on some of the band's previous albums." The Orange County Register noted that the album is concerned with "a search for inner meaning and the struggle for communication between people ... Although the LP has its strident moments, tracks like 'You Run', 'Surrender', and the hymnlike 'Uncovered' make up for it."

The Toronto Star thought that "these are tight, muscular workouts, nearly strangled by the glaringly short leash of rhythmic structure." The Capital Times deemed the album "worth a listen, especially for those who find the lyrics of most 'Christian rock' too simplistic." The Deseret News declared that "the Call's thoughtful, thought-provoking style is full of heartfelt messages in songs that are fervently spirited and spiritual, but secular nevertheless."

AllMusic wrote that "the album consists of some of The Call's strongest material and the undercurrent of optimism and big arena rock hooks results in it being their best bid for wider success."

== Track listing ==
All tracks are written by Michael Been and Jim Goodwin; except where noted.

No.	Title	Writer(s)	Length
1.	"Let the Day Begin"	Michael Been	3:50
2.	"You Run"	Michael Been	5:34
3.	"Surrender"		4:07
4.	"When"		5:18
5.	"Jealousy"		5:38
6.	"Same Ol' Story"	Michael Been	3:35
7.	"For Love"	Michael Been	6:13
8.	"Closer"		5:00
9.	"Communication"		5:39
10.	"Watch"	Michael Been, Harry Dean Stanton	4:18
11.	"Uncovered"		2:25

== Personnel ==
The Call

- Michael Been - guitar, bass guitar, lead vocals
- Tom Ferrier - guitar, vocals
- Jim Goodwin - keyboards, vocals
- Scott Musick - drums, vocals

with:

- Harry Dean Stanton - harmonica on "For Love"
