= Red Moon (The Call album) =

Studio album by The Call
- Released: August 17, 1990
- Genres: Rock, alternative rock, indie rock
- Length: 39:13
- Label: MCA
- Producer: Michael Been

The Call chronology
Let the Day Begin (1989)	Red Moon (1990)	Heaven & Back (1997)

Singles from Red Moon
- 1. "What's Happened to You" Released: 1990

Red Moon is the seventh studio album by the American rock band The Call. It was released in 1990. According to Michael Been in a 1992 interview, their label MCA reached out to radio asking them not to play the album or promote after dropping the band from the label during the middle of their European tour.

Question: ‘And that when Red Moon came out, label reps were actually calling stations and telling them not to play the record."

Been: "Yeah, that's probably what happened. I know the first story is—well, first of all, you know, 'truth' is not a big thing in this business. (laughs) You never know who said what. It's like the government. With Let the Day Begin, though—that was tragic. That really bothered us. Well, we had done the Red Moon album, which was kind of an experimental thing. You know, kind of acoustic-y, playing other kinds of instruments, and I think the record company felt that it was a slap in the face.

"I understood their position. What they wanted to do was just scrap that album, because they thought it had no commercial potential whatsoever. And we said, 'well, you could be right' ... I don’t know if they actually called radio stations and told them not to play it. All I know is that before it came out, some of the guys at the label said they loved it. But other people, I guess higher up, didn'’'t want it to come out."

In another interview, Been discussed the band’s relationship with MCA and how things soured with the label. "Our problem with MCA occurred 2 months after we signed with the label. The president of MCA at the time, Irving Azoff, personally signed the Call and was extremely enthusiastic. However, 2 months later, because of his own contractual difficulties with the label and his desire to create his own company, Azoff left MCA. The new president, Al Teller from CBS Records, wasn't that enthusiastic of the Call and the promotion of Let the Day Begin suffered drastically. The song "Let The Day Begin" went #1 on rock radio, but because the president wasn't crazy about the group there was limited promotion. As the next 2 years went on the relationship got worse and worse. And Red Moon was such a departure from Let the Day Begin, rather than adapt to that album, and promote the record for what it was, they let it go with little or no promotion whatsoever."

Been also felt that MCA selected the first single solely on the fact that Bono of U2 sang backing vocals without considering whether it was single material. "I don't care if Elvis and Lennon came back to life and sang backgrounds, it's not a single kind of song."

== Track listing ==
All songs written by Michael Been except as indicated.

1. "What's Happened to You" – 4:18
2. "Red Moon" – 3:46
3. "You Were There" – 4:04
4. "Floating Back" – 3:25
5. "A Swim in the Ocean" – 3:51
6. "Like You've Never Been Loved" – 4:14
7. "Family" – 3:41
8. "This Is Your Life" – 4:09
9. "The Hand That Feeds You" – 3:33
10. "What a Day" (Jim Goodwin, Been) – 4:12

== Personnel ==
The Call

- Scott Musick – drums, percussion
- Jim Goodwin – keyboards, saxophones, vocals
- Tom Ferrier – guitar, vocals
- Michael Been – bass, guitar, keyboards, lead vocals

with:

- Bono – backing vocals on the track "What's Happened to You"

Production

- Michael Been – producer
- The Call – producer
- Jim Scott – co-producer, recording engineer and mixer
- Steve Holroyd – assistant engineer
- Julie Last – assistant engineer
- J.D.Brill – studio monitor engineer
- Edd Kolakowski – guitar, piano and keyboard technician
- Brian Gardner – mastering engineer

== Reception ==
Professional ratings
Review scores
Source	Rating
AllMusic	4/5 stars

- AllMusic (Tom Demalon) – "After the big sounding (even by their standards) Let the Day Begin, The Call returned three years later with Red Moon, an intimate-sounding, organic record, particularly the use of rich organ passages in many songs. An intimate-sounding, organic record . . . With its lovely textures and melodic songs, Red Moon is start to finish [The Call's] fully realized and finest work."
