= Di Francesco =

Di Francesco (or di Francesco) is an Italian surname. Notable people with this surname include:

- Dario DiFrancesco (born 1948), Italian physiologist
- David DiFrancesco (born 1949), American photo scientist, inventor, cinematographer and photographer
- Donald DiFrancesco (born 1944), American politician
- Eusebio Di Francesco (born 1969), Italian football player and manager
- Federico Di Francesco (born 1994), Italian footballer
- Gianmarco Di Francesco (born 1989), Italian cyclist
- Giovanni di Francesco (1412–1459), Italian painter
- Lupo di Francesco (fl. 14th century), Italian sculptor and architect
- Mauro Di Francesco (1951–2025), Italian actor, comedian and television personality
- Philippe Di Francesco, French-American mathematician
- Stefano di Francesco (died 1427), Italian painter

== See also ==
- Francesco
- De Francesco
