= In the Key of the Universe =

Studio album by Joey DeFrancesco
- Released: March 1, 2019
- Studio: Tempest Recording, Tempe, AZ
- Genre: Jazz
- Length: 58:27
- Label: Mack Avenue
- Producer: Joey DeFrancesco, Gloria DeFrancesco

Joey DeFrancesco chronology
You're Driving Me Crazy (with Van Morrison) (2018)	In the Key of the Universe (2019)	More Music (2021)

In the Key of the Universe is a studio album by Joey DeFrancesco, released March 1, 2019. The album received a Grammy Award nomination for Best Jazz Instrumental Album.

== Reception ==
In the Key of the Universe ratings
Review scores
Source	Rating
All About Jazz	4/5 stars
AllMusic	4.5/5 stars
DownBeat	4/5 stars

All About Jazz's Chris Mosey called In the Key of the Universe "an important, even historic album" for featuring Pharoah Sanders' "return from oblivion", and that without Sanders, "the album would be just one more round of Hammond organ tunes that adhere to DeFrancesco's dictum 'I just like to swing.'" AllMusic's Matt Collar said that "While DeFrancesco has always played with an earthy soulfulness, on In the Key of the Universe he elevates that soulfulness to a divine musical plane." DownBeat's Jim Macnie says "there's an exquisite flow to the entire program."

== Track listing ==
All tracks are written by Joey DeFrancesco, except for track 6 which was written by Pharoah Sanders and Leon Thomas. All tracks are produced by Joey and Gloria DeFrancesco.

In the Key of the Universe track listing
No.	Title	Length
1.	"Inner Being"	5:18
2.	"Vibrations in Blue"	6:42
3.	"Awake and Blissed"	3:01
4.	"It Swung Wide Open"	3:54
5.	"In the Key of the Universe"	5:05
6.	"The Creator Has a Master Plan"	11:00
7.	"And So It Is"	7:52
8.	"Soul Perspective"	5:30
9.	"A Path Through the Noise"	4:47
10.	"Easier to Be"	5:14
Total length:		58:27

== Personnel ==
=== Musicians ===
- Joey DeFrancesco – organ, keyboards (1–3, 5–8, 10), trumpet (7, 10), arrangement (6)
- Billy Hart – drums
- Troy Roberts – tenor saxophone (3–5, 8–10), soprano saxophone (1, 8), alto saxophone (2), acoustic bass (6, 7)
- Sammy Figueroa – percussion (1, 2, 5–7, 9, 10)
- Pharoah Sanders – tenor saxophone (5–7), vocal (6)

=== Technical ===
- Clarke Rigsby – recording engineer, mixing engineer
- Nathan James – mastering engineer
- Chris Muth – vinyl mastering
- Gloria DeFrancesco – production manager
- Shannon Moore – product manager
- Raj Naik – design
- Daniel B. Holeman – cover
- Michael Woodall – photography
- Maria Ehrenreich – creative director
- Gretchen Valade – executive producer
- Will Wakefield – A&R
