= Contino =

Contino is an Italian surname. Notable people with the name include:

- Dick Contino (1930–2017), American accordionist and singer
- Fiora Contino (1925–2017), American opera conductor and teacher
- Juan Contino Aslán (born 1960), city mayor of Havana, Cuba

== See also ==
- Contino real, a court appointment in Late Medieval Spain
- The Contino Sessions, a 1999 album by British band Death in Vegas
