= The Call (band) =

American rock band

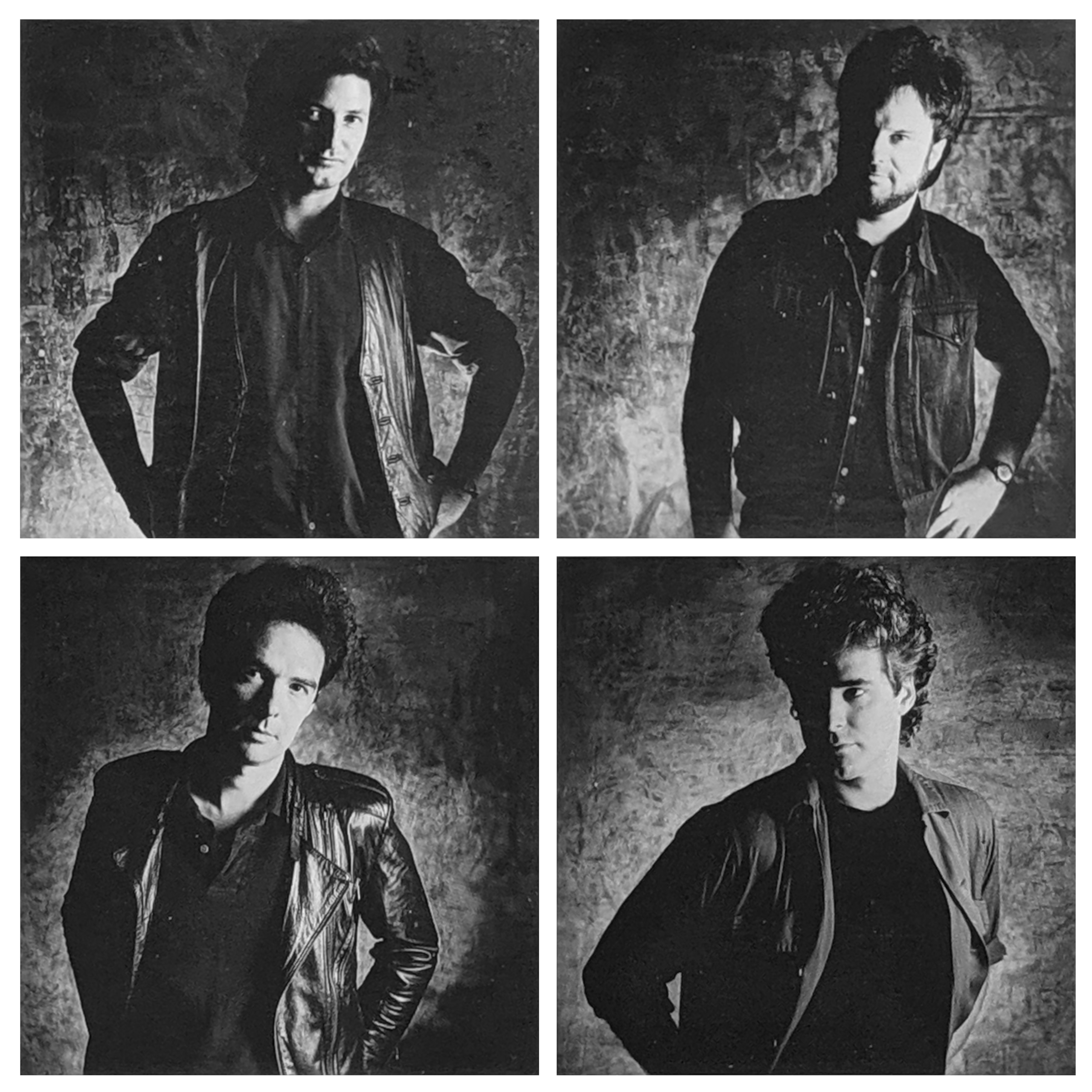
- The Call in 1987; Clockwise from top left: Tom Ferrier, Michael Been, Jim Goodwin, Scott Musick

Background information
- Origin: Santa Cruz, California
- Genres: Rock, new wave, post-punk
- Years active: 1980–2000, 2013, 2017, 2023–present
- Labels: MCA; Mercury; Elektra; Fingerprint
- Members: Tom Ferrier; Scott Musick; Jim Goodwin
- Past members: Michael Been; Greg Freeman; Joe Read; Steve Huddleston
- Website: the-call-band.com

The Call is an American rock band formed in Santa Cruz, California, in 1980. The main lineup consisted of members Michael Been, Scott Musick, Tom Ferrier, and Jim Goodwin. The band released nine studio albums over the next two decades before disbanding in 2000. Their 1986 song, "I Still Believe (Great Design)", was covered by Tim Cappello and included in the 1987 film The Lost Boys. The band also achieved significant success in 1989 with "Let the Day Begin", which reached No. 1 on the Billboard U.S. Mainstream Rock chart and was later used as a campaign theme song for Al Gore's 2000 Presidential Campaign.

== Formation and early career ==
The Call's original lineup was Been (lead vocals, guitar), Musick (drums, percussion), Ferrier (guitar), and Greg Freeman (bass). This lineup grew to include Steve Huddleston on keyboards from 1981 through 1983. Goodwin joined the band as keyboardist in 1983, replacing Huddleston. Freeman departed in 1984, and Joe Read (of Strapps, The Textones, and Code Blue) took over bass duties on Scene Beyond Dreams. Both originally from Oklahoma, Been and Musick didn't meet until moving independently to California. The Call were earlier known as Airtight and then Motion Pictures, serving as Phil Seymour's band at that time. A version of the John Prine/Phil Spector song "If You Don't Want My Love" with Phil backed by The Call was released on the 2020 album If You Don't Want My Love as part of the Phil Seymour archive series.

Beginning with their 1982 self-titled debut, they went on to produce and release nine studio albums by 2000. The Call recorded its eponymous premiere album in England and Been recalled in a 1987 interview that the band was in an exploratory phase at this point. He further noted, "The Call was a compassionate album, but it probably came out as anger." Peter Gabriel liked the band so much that he called them the "future of American music" and asked them to open for him during his 1982–1983 "Plays Live" tour. The Call's songcraft has been noted for its offering of theo-political critique within the Reagan-era that might be construed as negative, though "there is a strain of affirmation, even devotion, that also arises within the catalogue."

The Call's next album, Modern Romans, was notable for its political content. Been later stated, "There was a great deal happening politically — Grenada, Lebanon, or the government saying the Russians are evil and the Russian government probably saying the same about us. That kind of thinking inspired me to write the last lines of '[The] Walls Came Down'." Garth Hudson of the Band played keyboards on these first two records.

This was followed by Scene Beyond Dreams, which Been referred to as The Call's "metaphysical" album. With a strong poetic sense to the lyrics and a change in musical style, the change in sound is notable.

== Commercial hits and extended break ==
The Call recorded their next album, Reconciled, in mid-1985. By this point, Been had begun performing the bass guitar parts himself. Before this, the band had not been under a recording contract for two years due to what Been described as "legal bickering" between The Call's former record label, Mercury, and their management company." However, when the band signed a new deal with Elektra Records, The Call produced their most commercially successful album to date. Peter Gabriel, Simple Minds' Jim Kerr, Hudson, and Hudson's Band bandmate Robbie Robertson all performed as guests on the album, which Elektra released in 1986. Several tracks from the album became hits on the Mainstream Rock Chart, with one of these tracks, "I Still Believe (Great Design)" (also known simply as "I Still Believe"), appearing on the soundtrack of the 1986 film The Whoopee Boys. The song was noted for being emblematic of the Call's ability as a band to defy categorization, combining "the anger of punk with a stubborn refusal to surrender to the kind of nihilism that characterized a significant segment of the punk movement."

The following year, Tim Cappello covered "I Still Believe" for the film The Lost Boys. In the film, Cappello memorably stole the scene as a muscular bare-chested, oiled-up saxophonist belting out the tune on the beach. Contemporary Christian musician Russ Taff also covered the song on his 1987 self-titled album. More recently the Protomen covered the song on their 2015 cover album The Cover Up. In 2017, Klayton from Celldweller covered "Too Many Tears" on Offworld. In 2018, a cover version of "I Still Believe" appeared in the Paramount Pictures television series Waco about the Branch Davidian tragedy. In 2022, "I Still Believe" also featured prominently in the last episode of the second season of the TV show Reservation Dogs, which included a cameo by Cappello playing the saxophone.

The band released Into the Woods in 1987, which Been referred to as his favorite album. In 1989, they released Let the Day Begin, whose title track reached No. 1 on the US Mainstream Rock chart. Their label under-ordered physical copies of the album and the resultant decline in sales limited their chart position.

The Call released Red Moon, their final studio album for a major label, in 1990. The album included background vocals by U2's Bono on the track "What's Happened to You". The album took a turn into the then-rising genre of Americana and was out of step with the shock of grunge music taking over the airwaves. Following the Red Moon tour, the band took an "extended break".

== Reunion and legacy ==
The Call in 1990

Been's solo releases in the early 1990s, including the song "To Feel This Way" for the 1992 film Light Sleeper and the 1994 solo album On the Verge of a Nervous Breakthrough fueled rumors about the band's dissolution. However, in 1996, Warner Bros. Records. released The Best of The Call, which featured a selection of old favorites and a few new songs, including full-band re-recordings of Been's solo songs "Us" and "To Feel This Way".

In 1997, they released a new studio album, To Heaven and Back, on Fingerprint Records. A few years later, a music fan tracked Been down and helped him master a recording from their 1990 tour, leading to the release of their first live album, Live Under the Red Moon, in 2000 on the indie label Conspiracy Music. The band disbanded that same year.

Al Gore used "Let the Day Begin" as his campaign song in the 2000 U.S. Presidential Election and Tom Vilsack used it as his song during his brief 2008 U.S. Presidential Election campaign.

In 2009, the Oklahoma History Center held a temporary exhibition titled "Another Hot Oklahoma Night: A Rock & Roll Exhibit", which presented the state's contribution to the history of rock music. The exhibition derived its name from a line in The Call's song "Oklahoma", which was also one of the ten finalists in a 2009 vote for Oklahoma's official state rock song. A book of the same name was published that featured The Call and other Oklahoma musicians.

Michael Been died on August 19, 2010, after suffering a heart attack backstage at the Pukkelpop music festival in Hasselt, Belgium, where he was working as the sound engineer for his son's, Robert Levon Been, band Black Rebel Motorcycle Club, also known as BRMC.

On April 18 and 19, 2013, band members Scott Musick, Tom Ferrier and Jim Goodwin reunited for a series of shows in San Francisco (Slims) and Los Angeles (The Troubadour) with BRMC's Robert Levon Been taking over bass and lead vocal duties. A Tribute to Michael Been featuring Robert Levon Been (of BRMC) was released on September 2, 2014, and featured songs recorded during those two 2013 shows. The CD version included 14 songs, while the special CD/DVD combo pack and a digital deluxe version featured 19 songs. The band also released the set on limited-edition vinyl. In 2015, an hour-long TV special using footage from the DVD was shown on VH1 Classic and Palladia."The Call: A Tribute To Michael Been". Palladia. Archived from the original on February 24, 2015.

On April 22, 2017, the Call reunited and played a show in New Orleans, Louisiana, at Siberia, with special guest vocalists Ray Ganucheau, Michael Divita, and J.D. Buhl.

On June 4, 2021, Recalling The Call, an in depth history of The Call was released.

On August 28, 2021, the Call was inducted into the Oklahoma Music Hall of Fame. Scott Musick and Steve Huddleston were present to accept their awards, and Michael Been's sister accepted his posthumous award on his behalf.

In 2023, the remaining band members (Tom Ferrier, Jim Goodwin, and Scott Musick, along with Ralph Patlan) went back to the archives and discovered some live recordings and nearly complete studio tracks featuring Michael Been's voice. They resolved to go back into the studio to finish off these recordings and issue them on a brand new studio album, The Lost Tapes, set to be released in 2024. The Lost Tapes is a new studio album of tracks from prior sessions which were never released. All of these newly finished recordings feature Michael Been, Jim Goodwin, Tom Ferrier and Scott Musick. The album will also include several rarities from 1978–1981 when the band was known as Airtight and Motion Pictures. The remastered versions of Reconciled and Into the Woods are also set for release.

On January 26, 2024, the band released the first new single "Welcome to My World" from The Lost Tapes on Spotify and other digital services.

== Members ==
- Michael Been – lead vocals, bass, guitar, keyboards (1980–2000)
- Tom Ferrier – guitar, vocals (1980–2000, 2013, 2017, 2023-present)
- Greg Freeman – bass, vocals (1980–1984)
- Scott Musick – drums, percussion, vocals (1980–2000, 2013, 2017, 2023-present)
- Steve Huddleston – keyboards, vocals (1981–1983)
- Jim Goodwin – keyboards, vocals (1984–2000, 2013, 2017, 2023-present)
- Joe Read – bass, vocals (1984–1986)

== Discography ==
=== Albums ===
Studio

- The Call, 1982
- Modern Romans, 1983 US No. 84, AUS No. 50
- Scene Beyond Dreams, 1984 US No. 204
- Reconciled, 1986 US No. 82
- Into the Woods, 1987 US No. 123
- Let the Day Begin, 1989 US No. 64
- Red Moon, 1990
- To Heaven and Back, 1997
- The Lost Tapes, 2024

Live

- Live Under the Red Moon, 2000
- A Tribute to Michael Been featuring Robert Levon Been (of BRMC), 2014

Compilation

- The Walls Came Down: The Best of the Mercury Years, 1991
- The Best of The Call, 1997
- 20th Century Masters – The Millennium Collection: The Best of the Call, 2000
- The Call - Collected, 2019

=== Singles ===
Year	Single	Peak chart positions					Album
Year	Single	US Hot 100	US Mod	US Main	AUS	UK	Album
1983	"The Walls Came Down"	74	—	17	21	—	Modern Romans
1986	"Everywhere I Go"	—	—	38	—	—	Reconciled
1986	"I Still Believe (Great Design)"	—	—	17	—	—	Reconciled
1987	"I Don't Wanna"	—	—	38	—	—	Into the Woods
1989	"Let the Day Begin"	51	5	1	74	42	Let the Day Begin
1989	"You Run"	—	—	29	—	78	Let the Day Begin
1990	"What's Happened to You"	—	25	39	—	—	Red Moon
"—" denotes releases that did not chart
