= The Prophet Speaks =

Studio album by Van Morrison
- Released: 7 December 2018
- Recorded: 2018
- Studio: Studio D (Sausalito, California)
- Genre: Jazz
- Length: 68:49
- Label: Exile Productions; Caroline
- Producer: Van Morrison, Joey DeFrancesco

Van Morrison chronology
You're Driving Me Crazy (2018)	The Prophet Speaks (2018)	Three Chords & the Truth (2019)

The Prophet Speaks is the 40th studio album by Northern Irish singer-songwriter Van Morrison, and the second to feature jazz organist and trumpeter Joey DeFrancesco. Released on 7 December 2018 by Exile Productions and Caroline Records, it was his fourth album "of new material in just fifteen months".

== Critical reception ==
Professional ratings
Aggregate scores
Source	Rating
Metacritic	73/100
Review scores
Source	Rating
AllMusic	4/5 stars
American Songwriter	4/5 stars
The Guardian	3/5 stars
The Independent	4/5 stars
The Observer	4/5 stars
Paste	7.2/10
Rolling Stone	3/5 stars

The Prophet Speaks received generally positive reviews, with Metacritic giving it 73 / 100, based on 11 reviews. It delivered "excellent songs, expertly rendered", leading The Observer to conclude that "Van Morrison’s current prolificacy clearly hasn’t compromised the quality of his output at all – this is another thoroughly enjoyable mix of vocal jazz and bluesy R&B." Rolling Stone heralded it as "further proof that he’s still one of the most moving, unrivaled singers of his generation", suggesting that Morrison wants to convey "that he’s able to write old-time originals that are mostly indistinguishable" from the classics he covers. Its review finds it "moving to hear Morrison revert back to his primordial roots", but finds that the album "feels like another headstrong gesture of self-determination". The Irish Times deemed it a "pleasure and a privilege to luxuriate" in the "exemplary" musicianship, concluding that "[at] his imperial best, Van the Man can still be mystical and magical after all these years.

== Track listing ==
No.	Title	Writer(s)	Length
1.	"Gonna Send You Back to Where I Got You From"	Eddie Vinson, Leona Blackman	4:40
2.	"Dimples"	John Lee Hooker, James Bracken	5:33
3.	"Got to Go Where the Love Is"	Van Morrison	4:23
4.	"Laughin' and Clownin'"	Sam Cooke	5:31
5.	"5 am Greenwich Mean Time"	Van Morrison	5:37
6.	"Gotta Get You Off My Mind"	Solomon Burke, Delores Burke, Josephine Burke Moore	3:44
7.	"Teardrops"	J.D. Harris	6:00
8.	"I Love the Life I Live"	Willie Dixon	3:34
9.	"Worried Blues / Rollin' and Tumblin'"	J.D. Harris	6:22
10.	"Ain't Gonna Moan No More"	Van Morrison	6:15
11.	"Love Is a Five Letter Word"	Gene Barge	3:45
12.	"Love Is Hard Work"	Van Morrison	4:28
13.	"Spirit Will Provide"	Van Morrison	4:03
14.	"The Prophet Speaks"	Van Morrison	4:54
Total length:			1:08:49

== Personnel ==
- Van Morrison - vocals, alto saxophone, harmonica
- Joey DeFrancesco - organ, keyboards, trumpet
- Dan Wilson - acoustic and electric guitar
- Troy Roberts - acoustic bass, tenor saxophone, soprano saxophone
- Michael Ode - drums
- Jim Stern - tambourine, recording, mixing
- Shana Morrison - backing vocals on "Gotta Get You Off My Mind" and "Spirit Will Provide"

== Charts ==
Chart (2018)	Peak position
Australian Albums (ARIA)	49
Austrian Albums (Ö3 Austria)	23
Belgian Albums (Ultratop Flanders)	35
Dutch Albums (Album Top 100)	29
German Albums (Offizielle Top 100)	22
Irish Albums (IRMA)	50
Italian Albums (FIMI)	68
New Zealand Albums (RMNZ)	34
Spanish Albums (PROMUSICAE)	21
Swiss Albums (Schweizer Hitparade)	34
UK Albums (OCC)	40
US Billboard 200	110
US Top Rock Albums (Billboard)	15
US Top Jazz Albums (Billboard)	2
