= John DeFrancesco =

American jazz organist and vocalist (1940–2024)

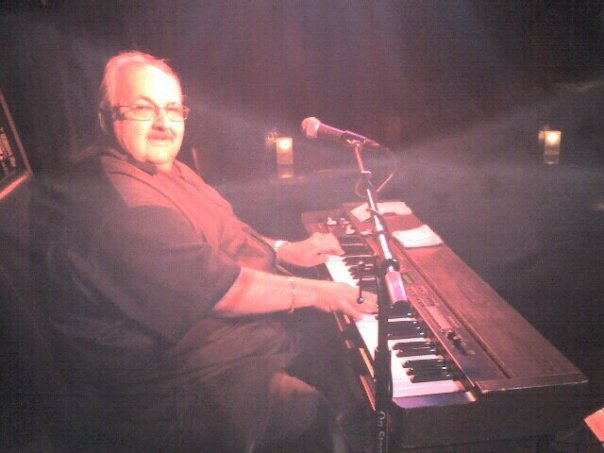
- DeFrancesco performing, c. 2008

Background information
- Also known as: "Papa" John DeFrancesco
- Born: John Jasper DeFrancesco; September 12, 1940
- Origin: Philadelphia, Pennsylvania, U.S.
- Died: June 25, 2024 (aged 83)
- Genres: Jazz
- Occupation: Musician
- Instrument: Hammond B3 organ
- Years active: 1960s–2024
- Labels: Muse; Highnote; Savant
- Children: Joey; Johnny

John Jasper DeFrancesco (September 12, 1940 – June 25, 2024) was an American jazz organist and vocalist, and father of Joey and Johnny DeFrancesco. He died on June 25, 2024, at the age of 83.

== Discography ==
- 1993: Doodlin' (Muse)
- 1995: Comin' Home (Muse)
- 1998: All in the Family (HighNote) – with Joey DeFrancesco
- 2001: Hip Cake Walk (HighNote)
- 2003: Jumpin' (Savant)
- 2004: Walking Uptown (Savant)
- 2006: Desert Heat (Savant)
- 2009: Big Shot (Savant)
- 2011: A Philadelphia Story (Savant)
