= Johnny DeFrancesco =

American blues guitarist (born 1965)

- Born: January 18, 1965 (age 61)
- Origin: Philadelphia, Pennsylvania, U.S.
- Genres: Blues
- Occupation: Musician
- Instrument: Guitar
- Years active: mid-1990s–present
- Labels: Ton A' Chopps; Vectordisc; Horseplay
- Relatives: "Papa" John (father); Joey (brother)

Johnny DeFrancesco (born January 18, 1965) is an American blues guitarist. He is the son of organist "Papa" John DeFrancesco and the brother of organist Joey DeFrancesco.

== Biography ==
DeFrancesco was born on January 18, 1965, and grew up outside of Philadelphia, Pennsylvania, United States. By the time he was 14, he was already performing in local Philadelphia jazz clubs with his father. At the age of 18, he had achieved recognition on the Philadelphia scene for his blues vocals and guitar playing.

In 1997, DeFrancesco joined the faculty of Berklee College of Music in Boston, Massachusetts, where he taught a number of notable guitarists, including John Mayer. He currently resides in Philadelphia and performs with his group the Johnny DeFrancesco Power Trio.

He has worked with Duke Jethro, John Lee Hooker, Luther Tucker, Johnny Heartsman, and Ike Turner.

== Discography ==
=== As leader/co-leader ===
- A Tribute to B. B. King's 'Live at the Regal' (Ton A' Chopps, 2017) – with Duke Jethro
- The DeFrancesco Brothers (Vectordisc #016, 2011) – with Joey DeFrancesco
- I Saw It Comin' (Vectordisc #010, 2009) – with guest Joey DeFrancesco
- Power Trio Live! (Horseplay, 2000)
- Make a Move (Ton A' Chopps, 1995)

=== As sideman ===
- Khani Cole, Places (Fahrenheit, 1999)

With John DeFrancesco

- A Philadelphia Story (Savant, 2011)
- Walking Uptown (Savant, 2004)
- Jumpin' (Savant, 2003)
- Hip Cake Walk (HighNote, 2001)
- Doodlin' (Muse, 1993)
