= Joey DeFrancesco =

American jazz musician (1971–2022)

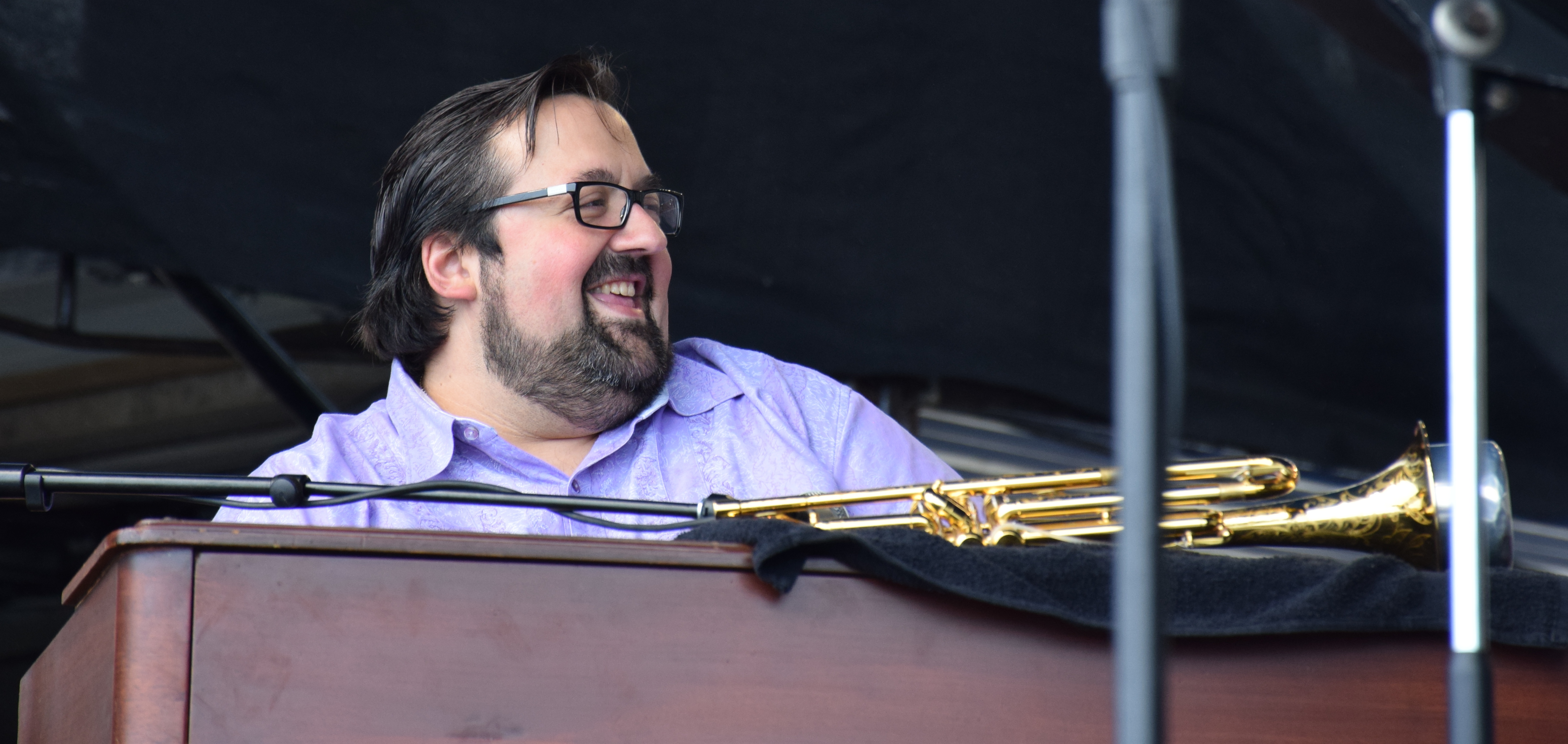
- DeFrancesco playing the organ at the Newport Jazz Festival, 2014

Background information
- Born: April 10, 1971; Springfield, Pennsylvania, U.S.
- Died: August 25, 2022 (aged 51) Phoenix, Arizona, U.S.
- Genres: Jazz; bebop
- Occupation: Musician
- Instruments: Hammond organ; piano; keyboards; trumpet; tenor saxophone
- Works: Joey DeFrancesco discography
- Years active: 1988–2022
- Labels: Blue Note; Columbia; Concord; Mack Avenue; Highnote; Muse; Prestige
- Website: joeydefrancesco.com
- Relatives: "Papa" John (father); Johnny (brother)

Joey DeFrancesco (April 10, 1971 – August 25, 2022) was an American jazz organist, trumpeter, saxophonist, and occasional singer. He released more than 30 albums under his own name and recorded extensively as a sideman with such leading jazz musicians as trumpeter Miles Davis, saxophonist Houston Person, and guitarist John McLaughlin.

DeFrancesco signed his first record deal at the age of 16 and over the years, recorded and toured internationally with David Sanborn, Arturo Sandoval, Larry Coryell, Frank Wess, Benny Golson, James Moody, Steve Gadd, Danny Gatton, Elvin Jones, Jimmy Cobb, George Benson, Pat Martino, Tony Monaco, John Scofield, Lee Ritenour, Joe Lovano, and had prominent session work with a variety of musicians, including Ray Charles, Bette Midler, Janis Siegel, Diana Krall, Jimmy Smith, and Van Morrison.

== Early life and education ==
Joey DeFrancesco was born in Springfield, Pennsylvania, United States, on April 10, 1971, into a musical family that included three generations of jazz musicians. He was named after his grandfather, Joseph DeFrancesco, a jazz musician who played the saxophone and clarinet. His father, "Papa" John DeFrancesco, was an organist who played nationally and received the Oklahoma Jazz Hall of Fame's Living Legend Award in 2013. DeFrancesco began playing the organ at the age of four and was playing songs by Jimmy Smith verbatim by the time he was five. His father began taking him to gigs from the age of five, letting him sit in on sets. At the age of 10, DeFrancesco joined a band in Philadelphia that included jazz musicians Hank Mobley and Philly Joe Jones. He was considered a fixture at local jazz clubs, opening shows for Wynton Marsalis and B. B. King.

DeFrancesco attended the Philadelphia High School for the Creative and Performing Arts. There, he studied music specializing in piano and organ. During his high school years, he won numerous awards, including the Philadelphia Jazz Society McCoy Tyner Scholarship. He was a finalist in the first Thelonious Monk International Jazz Piano Competition (now of the Herbie Hancock Institute of Jazz).

== Career ==
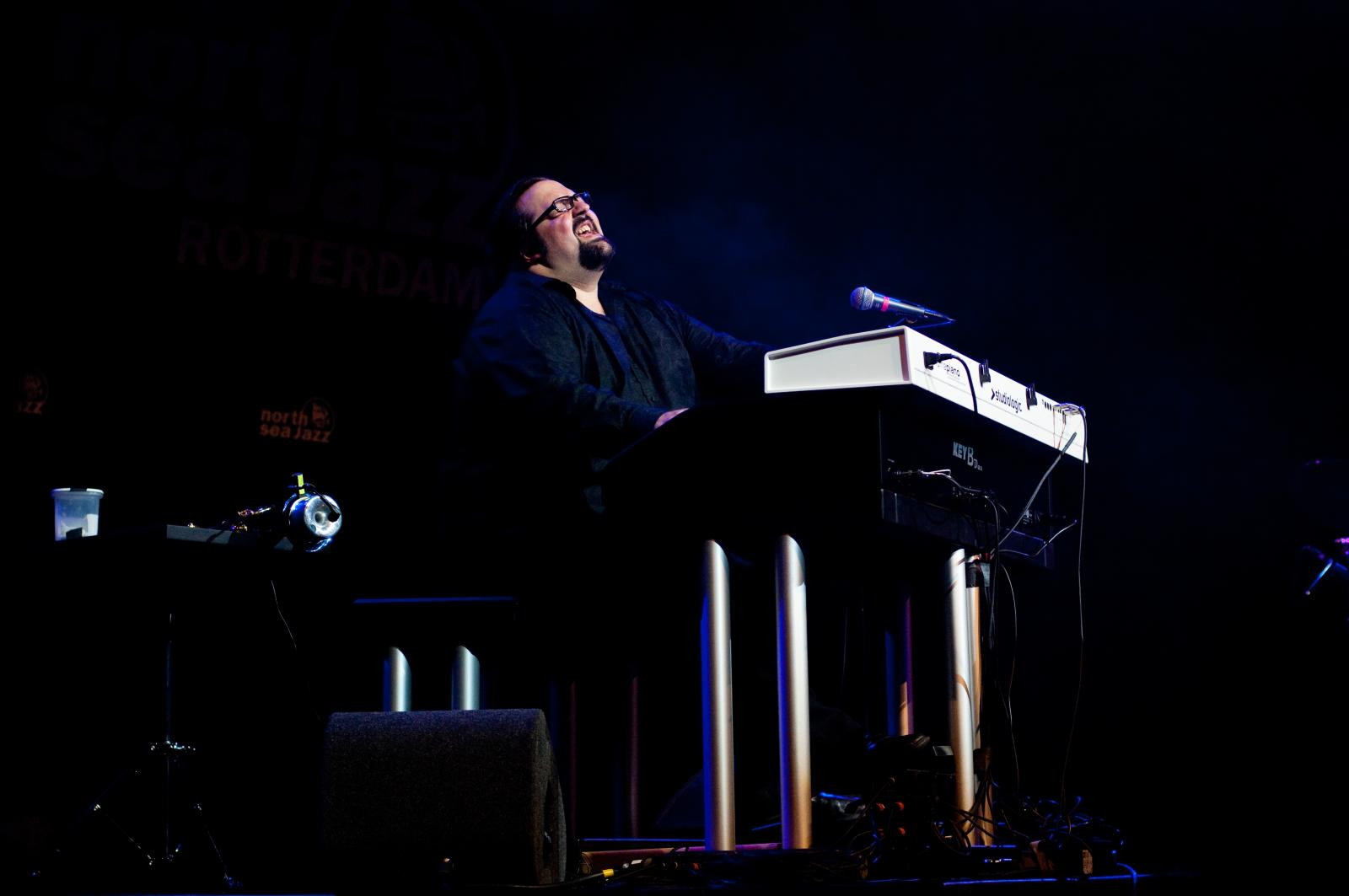
DeFrancesco playing at the North Sea Jazz Festival in Rotterdam, 2010

=== Recording ===
DeFrancesco was 16 years old when he signed an exclusive recording contract with Columbia Records. The following year, he released his first record, titled All of Me. His performance on All of Me has been attributed as helping bring back the organ to jazz music during the 1980s. That same year, he joined Miles Davis and his band on a five-week concert tour in Europe. He followed up with playing keyboards on Davis's album Amandla, which reached No. 1 on the Contemporary Jazz Albums chart in 1989. DeFrancesco started playing the trumpet around the same time, inspired by the sound of Davis. He was originally spotted by Davis during a performance on the television show called Time Out. He was performing on the set, along with high school classmate Christian McBride when Davis asked the show's host, "what's your organ player's name", referring to DeFrancesco. DeFrancesco's recording deal with Columbia included five albums. In addition to All of Me, he released Where Were You? (1990), Part III (1991), Reboppin' (1992), and Live at the 5 Spot (1993).

=== Touring ===
DeFrancesco began touring with his own quartet at the age of 18. In the early 1990s, he began collaborating with John McLaughlin, former guitarist for Miles Davis and the leader of Mahavishnu Orchestra. At the age of 22, he became a founding member of the group The Free Spirits, along with McLaughlin and drummer Dennis Chambers. He toured with the group for four years and was part of several recordings, including the albums Tokyo Live and After the Rain. DeFrancesco also played trumpet on the former album.

In 1999, DeFrancesco recorded his album Incredible! Live at the San Francisco Jazz Festival. The album featured a performance by his idol Jimmy Smith, who joined DeFrancesco for two songs. In 2004, DeFrancesco recorded Legacy, another album that featured Jimmy Smith. The album was Smith's last recording; he died the same year.

DeFrancesco was nominated for a Grammy Award in 2004 for his album Falling in Love Again. His career shifted slightly in 2009 with the film Moonlight Serenade, starring Amy Adams and Alec Newman. He played the role of "Frank D" in the film and was also credited as a composer and producer of the film. DeFrancesco was nominated for another Grammy Award in 2011 in the category Best Contemporary Jazz Album for Never Can Say Goodbye: The Music of Michael Jackson; the album was released in 2010 as a tribute to Michael Jackson. Some other tribute albums of his include a tribute to Frank Sinatra titled Joey DeFrancesco Plays Sinatra His Way and a tribute to Jimmy Smith. DeFrancesco also turned 40 in 2011, celebrating by releasing 40, his 29th recording, which had success both on jazz charts domestically and in Europe.

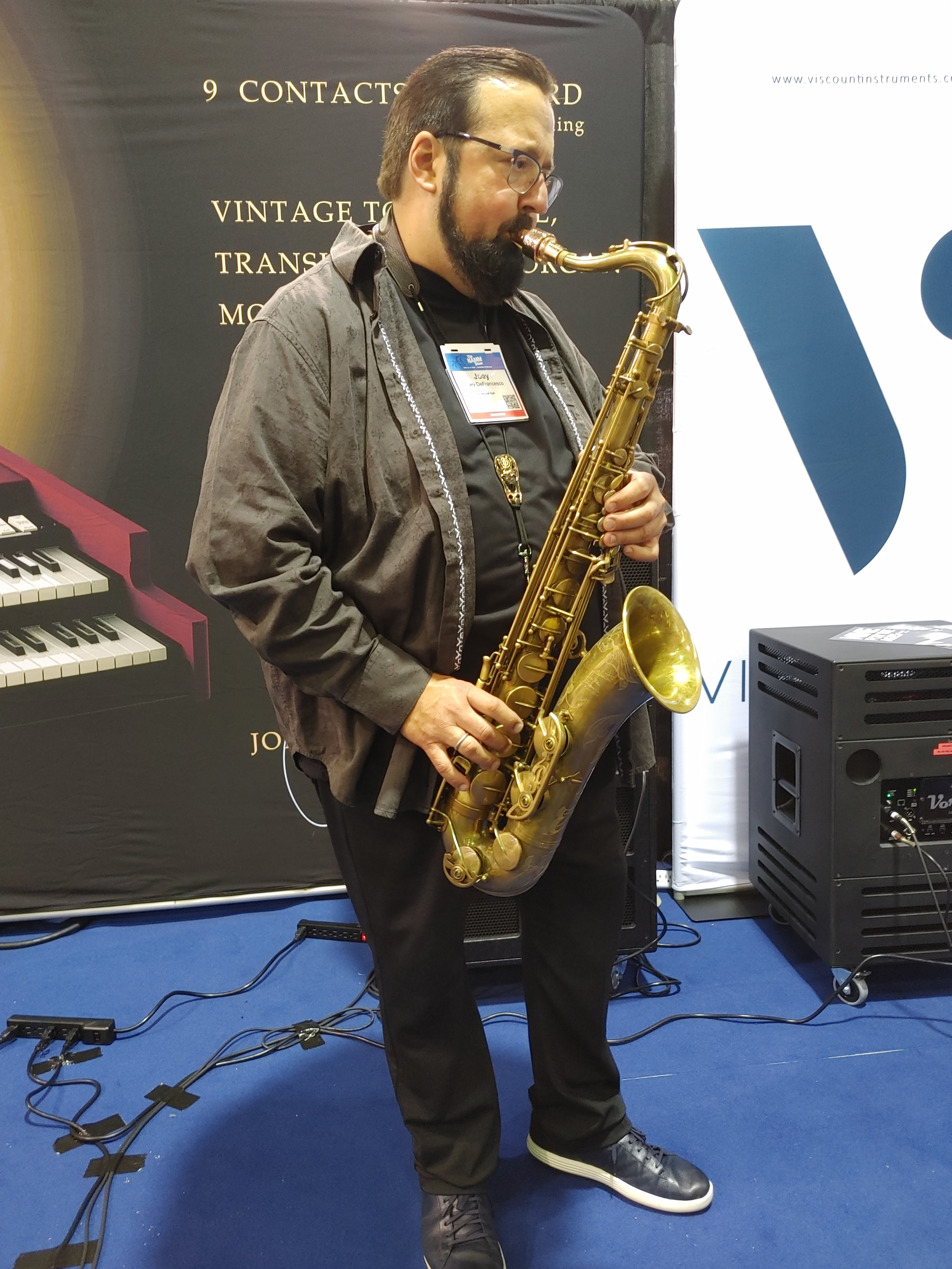
Joey DeFrancesco playing tenor saxophone at the 2022 NAMM Show

=== Music style ===
DeFrancesco's music style was referred to as a swinging Philly sound which he "embellished with his own ferocity and improvisation." He played 200-plus nights a year throughout the course of his career, a feat that he cut back on as of 2013. He received numerous accolades for his performances, including being called the best Hammond B3 organ player on the planet by JazzTimes. The New York Times described DeFrancesco as a "deeply authoritative musician, a master of rhythmic pocket, and of the custom of stomping bass lines beneath chords and riffs." The Chicago Tribune praised the musicianship of DeFrancesco, stating that "He dominated the instrument and the field as no one of his generation has." DeFrancesco was also involved in musical instrument development, especially product designs and endorsements related to technological advancements in digital keyboards and electronic organ both in the United States and internationally.

=== Multi-instrumentalist ===
As a multi-instrumentalist, DeFrancesco recorded on various keyboards (including acoustic and electric piano), and trumpet. Although best known as a jazz organist, he also performed as a singer and, since November 2018, played the tenor saxophone.

== Awards and honors ==
DeFrancesco was a four time Grammy Award-nominee, with more than 30 recordings as a leader. In addition to Grammy nominations in 2004, 2010, and 2020, DeFrancesco was a 9-time winner of the DownBeat Critics' Poll (for organ) and won the DownBeat Readers Poll every year since 2005. He won a number of JazzTimes awards as well. DeFrancesco was an inaugural member of the Hammond Hall of Fame, inducted in 2013 along with Brian Auger, Billy Preston, Steve Winwood, and his mentor, Jimmy Smith.

== Discography ==
DeFrancesco's discography consists of albums released on the labels Columbia, Muse, Highnote, Big Mo, Concord Jazz, Doodlin', and Mack Avenue.

== Personal life ==
In addition to his musician father and grandfather, DeFrancesco's brother, Johnny, is a blues guitarist.

DeFrancesco was married to his second wife, Gloria, until his death. She served as his manager. DeFrancesco had one daughter with his first wife, Ashley Blue DeFrancesco.

== Death ==
DeFrancesco died of a heart attack on August 25, 2022, at the age of 51. The following week, at a concert in Boston, Van Morrison paid tribute to his one-time collaborator, dedicating "You're Driving Me Crazy" to him.
