= Black Rebel Motorcycle Club discography =

This is discography of the American rock band Black Rebel Motorcycle Club

== Studio albums ==
Year	Details	Peak chart positions															Certifications (sales thresholds)
Year	Details	US	AUS	AUT	BEL	DEN	GER	FRA	IRE	ITA	NLD	NZL	NOR	SWE	SWI	UK	Certifications (sales thresholds)
2001	B.R.M.C.: Released: April 3, 2001; Label: Virgin	—	76	—	—	—	49	122	28	—	—	39	—	53	—	25	UK: Gold
2003	Take Them On, On Your Own: Released: August 25, 2003; Label: Virgin	47	34	33	—	24	27	43	21	8	63	17	15	13	46	3	UK: Gold
2005	Howl: Released: August 22, 2005; Label: RCA/Echo	90	34	45	42	35	33	83	29	57	47	—	—	27	50	14	UK: Silver
2007	Baby 81: Released: April 30, 2007; Label: RCA/Island	46	36	71	59	—	58	98	27	99	—	—	—	53	50	15	
2008	The Effects of 333: Released: November 1, 2008; Label: Abstract Dragon	—	—	—	—	—	—	—	—	—	—	—	—	—	—	—	
2010	Beat the Devil's Tattoo: Released: March 8, 2010; Label: Abstract Dragon/Vagrant	58	50	49	59	—	60	76	66	—	—	—	—	—	44	58	
2013	Specter at the Feast: Released: March 18, 2013; Label: Abstract Dragon/Vagrant	35	53	39	54	27	67	89	67	—	55	—	—	—	32	31	
2018	Wrong Creatures: Released: January 12, 2018; Label: Abstract Dragon/Vagrant	—	45	17	31	—	22	60	—	—	115	—	—	—	8	35	
"—" denotes releases that did not chart.

== EPs ==
- Screaming Gun EP (October 2001)
- Spread Your Love EP (2002) (Japan)
- Howl Sessions EP (2005)
- Napster Live Session (2007)
- American X: Baby 81 Sessions EP (2007)
- Kings of Leon/Black Rebel Motorcycle Club split EP (2008)
- Black Tape EP (2024)

== Live albums ==
- Black Rebel Motorcycle Club Live (2009)
- LIVE in London (2010)
- LIVE in Paris (2015)
- Live At Levitation (2023)

== Singles ==
Date	Title	Peak chart positions					Album
Date	Title	AUS	EU	IRE	UK	UK Indie	Album
2001	"Red Eyes and Tears"	—	—	—	—	—	B.R.M.C.
2001	"Rifles"	—	—	—	—	—	B.R.M.C.
2001	"Whatever Happened to My Rock and Roll (Punk Song)"	—	—	—	—	7	B.R.M.C.
2002	"Love Burns"	—	—	—	37	—	B.R.M.C.
2002	"Spread Your Love"	—	—	—	27	—	B.R.M.C.
2002	"Whatever Happened to My Rock and Roll (Punk Song)"	—	—	—	46	—	B.R.M.C.
2003	"Stop"	100	—	42	19	—	Take Them On, On Your Own
2003	"We're All in Love"	—	—	—	45	—	Take Them On, On Your Own
2005	"Shuffle Your Feet"	—	—	—	—	—	Howl
2005	"Ain't No Easy Way"	—	69	50	21	—	Howl
2007	"Weapon of Choice"	—	—	—	35	—	Baby 81
2007	"Berlin"	—	—	—	89	—	Baby 81
2010	"Beat the Devil's Tattoo"	—	—	—	—	—	Beat the Devil's Tattoo
2013	"Let the Day Begin"	—	—	—	—	—	Specter at the Feast
2017	"Little Thing Gone Wild"	—	—	—	—	—	Wrong Creatures
2017	"Haunt"	—	—	—	—	—	Wrong Creatures
2017	"Question of Faith"	—	—	—	—	—	Wrong Creatures
2017	"King of Bones"	—	—	—	—	—	Wrong Creatures
2018	"Echo"	—	—	—	—	—	Wrong Creatures

== Other contributions ==
- NME Awards 2004: Rare and Unreleased (2004, NME) - "The Hardest Button to Button" (live), White Stripes cover
- Bones Original Television Soundtrack (2005, Nettwerk) – "Feel It Now"
- Southland Tales: Music from the Motion Picture (2007, Milan Entertainment) – "Howl" (extended version)
- The Twilight Saga: New Moon: Original Motion Picture Soundtrack (2009, Atlantic Records) – "Done All Wrong"
- True Blood: Music from the HBO Original Series, Vol. 3 - deluxe edition (2011, WaterTower Music) – "Bad Things", Jace Everett cover
- Batman: Arkham City – The Album (2011, WaterTower Music) – "Shadow on the Run"
- NCIS: Los Angeles (The Original TV Soundtrack) (2013, Artists' Addiction Records) – "Devil In The Back Seat"
