= Peter Hayes (musician) =

American musician and singer (born 1976)

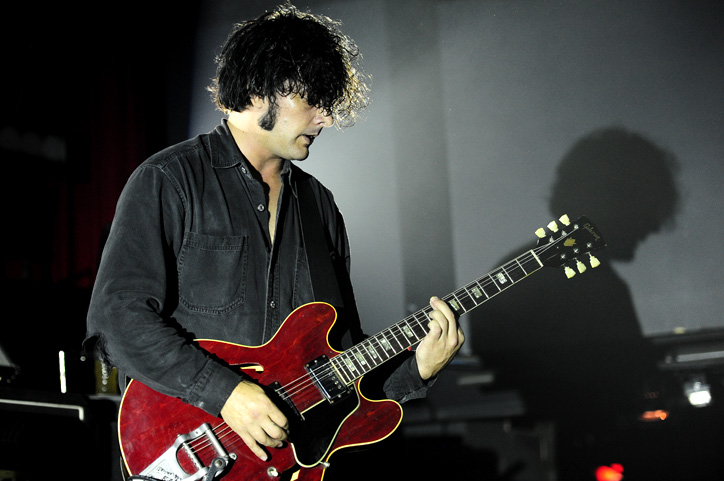
- Peter Hayes (BRMC) at Metropolis Fremantle (2010)

Background information
- Born: February 11, 1976 (age 50); New York Mills, Minnesota, U.S.
- Genres: Alternative rock; garage rock; neo-psychedelia; blues rock; noise rock; shoegazing
- Occupations: Musician, singer
- Instruments: Vocals; guitar; bass; keys; trombone; harmonica; piano
- Label: RCA
- Website: blackrebelmotorcycleclub.com

Peter Hayes (born February 11, 1976) is an American musician and singer, best known as a member of the rock band Black Rebel Motorcycle Club.

== Early life ==
Hayes grew up in Minnesota, and his first time playing music was learning the trombone and playing in symphonic band in school. When Hayes was 14 or 15 years old he got into trouble for drug use and was grounded for over a year. During that time he began figuring out how to play his mother's classical guitar out of boredom. She taught him some flamenco and finger picking songs, which was influential for Hayes, as was the music of Jimi Hendrix and Pink Floyd. One of Hayes' first electric guitars was a Peavey copy of a Hendrix-Style Fender Stratocaster. However Hayes early life was also influenced heavily by the country and folk guitar of Johnny Cash and Marty Robbins. He had a family friend who they called "Uncle" who would play for him old country tunes. Hayes would experiment with effects using a digital multi-effects unit, a Digitech RP1, utilizing the headphone jack to play for hours to himself. At a certain point Hayes gave up on "playing fast" like Hendrix and adopted open-tunings in order to play rhythm and lead at the same time, probably also from alternate-tuning blues and folk influence. Peter Hayes moved from the Midwest to Lafayette, California, a suburb in the East Bay Area, where he attended Acalanes High School and met future bandmate Robert Levon Been, whose father was in the rock band The Call. They had noticed each other when Been saw Hayes bringing his guitar to school. They bonded over songwriting. Hayes had begun playing cover songs playing at open mics, colleges, and bars playing spaced-out versions of old country and folk. His friends wouldn't show, but Been would. Hayes would eventually befriend Robert's father Michael Been. Through him he learned about guitar and music. Been had a spare ES335 lying around as well as Lexicon rack reverbs that Hayes used in his early days. Later "out of the blue", really through Robert's father, Hayes had a tryout with The Brian Jonestown Massacre. Peter is the father of two girls, age 10 and 16.

== The Brian Jonestown Massacre ==
Hayes played guitar and bass for the neo-psychedelic rock band The Brian Jonestown Massacre circa 1997/1998. Examples of his playing can be heard on the group's Give It Back! album.

Hayes appears as a highly visible, yet quiet musician in the 2004 movie documentary DiG! as an active touring member of The Brian Jonestown Massacre. The film also documents the befriended band The Dandy Warhols.

== Black Rebel Motorcycle Club ==
Peter Hayes is a founding and current member of the alternative rock trio Black Rebel Motorcycle Club.

== Discography ==
=== Albums with The Brian Jonestown Massacre ===
- Give It Back! (1997)

=== Albums with B.R.M.C. ===
- B.R.M.C. (2001) UK #25
- Take Them On, On Your Own (2003) US #47, UK #3, AUS #34
- Howl (2005) US #90, UK #14, AUS #34
- Baby 81 (2007) US #46, UK #15, AUS #36
- The Effects of 333 (2008)
- Beat The Devil's Tattoo (2010)
- Specter At The Feast (2013)
- Wrong Creatures (2018)

=== EPs with B.R.M.C. ===
- Screaming Gun EP (October 2001)
- Howl Sessions EP (2005)
- Napster Live Session (2007)
- American X: Baby 81 Sessions EP (2007)

== Musical equipment ==
Guitars:

- Multiple Gibson ES-335's all in different tunings.
- Gibson SG - Eventually replaced a Fender Thinline Deluxe Telecaster.
- Gibson ES-125 - May have been stolen.
- Gibson J-200 - At least two different ones.
- Gibson J-45 - Seems to be shared with Robert.
- Delta King Dot Guitar

Amplifiers (Around the time of each album):

- B.R.M.C.

- Fender Silverface Twin Reverb - x2

- Take Them On, On Your Own

- Fender Silverface Twin Reverb - x2
- Fender Super Twin
- Gallien Krueger 400RB Bass Amp Head with cab

- Howl & Baby 81

- Fender Blackface Bandmaster Head with matching 2x12 cab - x2
- Fender Blackface Pro Reverb - x2 (Interchanged with Twin Reverbs)
- Fender Blackface Twin Reverb - x2 (Interchanged with Pro Reverbs)

- Beat The Devil's Tattoo

- Fender Blackface Bandmaster Head with matching 2x12 cab - x2
- Fender Blackface Twin Reverb (Sometimes seen with the second Blackface Twin set off to the side in front of the drum set, possibly for use of stereo effects.)
- Some kind of vintage style Marshall head possibly a Plexi or JTM45 with matching 4x12 cab

Pedals & rack effects:

List compiled from use of various photos, most likely an incomplete list.

- Earlier years (Approx. around time of the first and second album possibly going into Howl era)

- Ibanez TS9 Tubescreamer x3
- Vox V847 Wah
- Dunlop Stereo Tremolo
- TC Electronic Stereo Chorus/Flanger
- Boss DM2 Analog Delay
- Boss BF2 Flanger
- Boss CS2 Compressor
- Boss Line Selector
- Ernie Ball Volume Pedal
- Akai Headrush E1 Delay
- Alesis Quadraverb x4

- Later years (Most likely around Howl era up to Beat the Devil's Tattoo era)

- Klon Centaur Overdrive x2
- Keeley Katana Boost
- Maxon OD808 Tubescreamer
- Vintage FX Overdrive (Replaced Maxon OD808)
- Vintage FX Fuzzriot (Hasn't been used on recent tours)
- Seymour Duncan Twin Tube Classic (Most likely used only for recording and rehearsal. Can be seen in pictures of rehearsal room before the Beat the Devil's Tattoo tour.)
- Boss DD7 Digital Delay
- Akai Headrush E2 Delay
- Dunlop Crybaby Wah
- Ernie Ball Volume Pedal x3
- Boss RC2 Loop Station w/ Footswitch (Also been seen with Boss RC20 Loop Station around Howl era)
- Seymour Duncan Shape Shifter Tremolo
- Voodoo Labs Ground Control Unit
- Korg Rackmount Tuner
- TC Electronic G Major Multi-FX Rack Unit x2
- Tech 21 SansAmp PSA-1
- Voodoo Lab Amp Selector
