= Shape of Things to Come =

Shape of Things to Come may refer to:

== Literature ==
- The Shape of Things to Come, a 1933 science fiction novel by H G Wells
- The Shape of Things to Come: Prophecy and the American Voice, a collection of essays by Greil Marcus

== Film and television ==
- Things to Come (also known as The Shape of Things to Come), a 1936 British film based on the Wells novel
- H. G. Wells' The Shape of Things to Come, a 1979 Canadian film loosely based on the Wells novel
- The Shape of Things to Come (film), 2021 science fiction film directed by Victor Manuel Checa
- "The Shape of Things to Come" (Lost), 2008 television series episode
- "The Shape of Things to Come", 2005 television series episode, see The O.C. season 3

== Music ==
- "Shape of Things to Come" (song), 1968 song written by Barry Mann and Cynthia Weil
- Shape of Things to Come (Max Frost and the Troopers album), 1968
- Shape of Things to Come (George Benson album), 1969
- "Shape of Things to Come", song by Audioslave from Revelations
- "The Shape of Things to Come", 1979 song by The Headboys
- "The Shape of Things to Come", composition by Bear McCreary, see Music of Battlestar Galactica (reimagining)
- The Shape of Things to Come..., 2003 EP by My Ruin
- "The Shape of Things to Come", song by Sonne Hagal from Ockerwasser

== See also ==
- "Shapes of Things", a 1966 rock song by the Yardbirds
- The Shape of Jazz to Come, a 1959 album by saxophonist Ornette Coleman
- The Shape of Punk to Come, a 1997 album by Swedish band Refused
- Things to Come (disambiguation)
