= NME Awards =

Annual music awards show

- Logo for the 2016 NME Awards
- Country: United Kingdom
- First award: 24 April 1953; 73 years ago
- Website: http://www.nme.com/awards

Television/radio coverage
- Network: ITV

The NME Awards is an annual music awards show in the United Kingdom, founded by the music magazine NME (New Musical Express). The first awards show was held in 1953 as the NME Poll Winners Concerts, shortly after the founding of the magazine. Though the accolades given are entirely genuine, the ceremony itself is usually carried out in a humorous and jovial manner, and have included categories in the past like "Villain of the Year" and "Worst Record". The trophies given to the winners resemble an extended middle finger.

== History ==
The awards began as the NME Poll Winners Concert and associated awards ceremony in 1953. These continued through until 1972, where concerts were filmed and broadcast on ITV. The Beatles and the Rolling Stones were most commonly featured. Venues included the Royal Albert Hall and the Empire Pool, Wembley. In 2008, a compact disc was given away with a special souvenir box set issue of the NME magazine on 27 February 2008, called NME Awards 2008.

=== Britpop era ===
In 1994, the awards were briefly renamed the NME Brat Awards, with the title intended as a parody of the Brit Awards. The initial award ceremonies were supportive of the burgeoning Britpop scene with Blur becoming the first band in the modern era to win more than three awards, coming away with five total. Again in 1996, rival band Oasis won four awards: Best Band, Best Live Band, Best Album ((What's the Story) Morning Glory?) and Best Single ("Wonderwall").

Later in the decade, major winners were the Manic Street Preachers (4 awards in 1999) and Blur (3 awards in 2000).

=== Garage rock revival ===
In 2002, the awards reflected the NME's support for the "New Rock Revolution" garage rock revival, with the Strokes winning three awards ("Best New Act", "Best Album" and "Band of the Year").

After the 2002 awards, an article on Telegraph.co.uk reported that the winners of the NME awards "were almost interchangeable" with the winners of the Brit awards and criticised then editor Ben Knowles for what they saw as a hypocritical attack on the commercial nature of the Brit Awards.

In 2003, Nick Jago, the drummer of Black Rebel Motorcycle Club gave a "silent" speech lasting 7 minutes, infavourably compared the show to The Source awards, was booed and heckled and had to be physically removed from the stage.

The Libertines won "Best British Band" in both 2004 and 2005, as well as "Best New Band" in 2003. The 2003 award win was notable for Pete Doherty breaking and entering former bandmate Carl Barât's house stealing many of his belongings, including his award.

In 2006, Arctic Monkeys won both "Best New Band" and "Best British Band" in the same year and became the third band in the modern era to win three awards (Best New Band, Best British Band, Best Track). In his speech, lead singer Alex Turner alluded to how the awards reflected who received the most coverage by the magazine; "Who else was going to be Best British Band? You don't write about something that much and then not tell you that you're Best British Band". Elsewhere that year, whilst collecting an award for his charity work, Bob Geldof called host Russell Brand a "cunt" to which Brand replied "[It's] no wonder Bob Geldof is such an expert on famine – he's been dining out on 'I Don't Like Mondays' for 30 years." In the same year, Kaiser Chiefs were nominated for a six categories and won Best Album for Employment.

In 2007, Razorlight received a worst album nomination for their self-titled album, which NME themselves gave 8/10. This made it the highest rated album to receive a worst album nomination.

The 2008 award nominations were criticised in The Guardian for a lack of diversity and not including any female artists. Also in 2008, the ceremony was followed by the NME Big Gig at the adjacent O2 Arena, where the Cribs performed with Johnny Marr, followed by Klaxons, Bloc Party, Kaiser Chiefs and Manic Street Preachers, who also performed with Tom Clarke of the Enemy and Cerys Matthews.

In 2009, Oasis were nominated for a record 7 awards, whilst Villain of the Year went to George W. Bush for the sixth year in a row.

In 2013, the Killers were awarded their fourth accolade in the "Best International Band" category.

In 2015, Kasabian were nominated for 9 awards, beating the 2009 Oasis record.

== Most wins ==
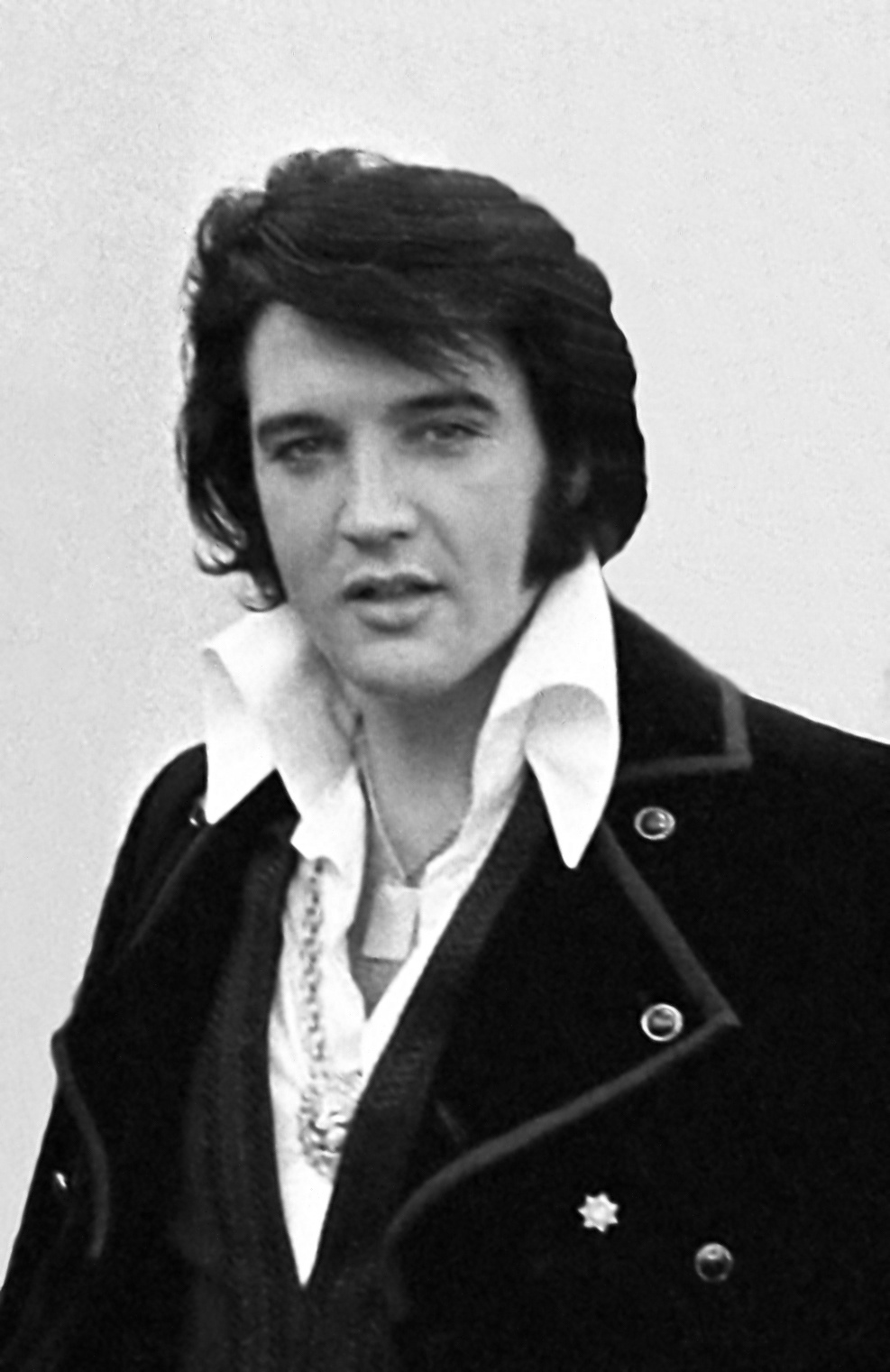
Elvis Presley, winner of 26 NME awards

=== Most NME Award wins ===
- Elvis Presley and John Peel (26 awards)
- Cliff Richard (21 awards)
- Paul Weller and Arctic Monkeys (20 awards)
- Muse (19 awards)
- Morrissey (18 awards)
- Oasis (17 awards)
- The Beatles (17 awards)
- The Jam (13 awards)
- Arctic Monkeys (12 awards)
- David Bowie (11 awards)

=== Multiple major awards per year ===
Note: This list only includes winners of major awards (e.g. Best Album, Best British Band, Best Track, etc.)

- 1968 – The Beatles (3 awards)
- 1973 – David Bowie (2 awards)
- 1974 – David Bowie (3 awards)
- 1986 – The Smiths (2 awards)
- 1992 – R.E.M (2 awards)
- 1995 – Blur (5 awards)
- 1996 – Oasis (4 awards)
- 1999 – Manic Street Preachers (4 awards)
- 2000 – Blur (3 awards)
- 2001 – Coldplay (2 awards)
- 2002 – The Strokes (3 awards)
- 2003 – Coldplay (2 awards)
- 2005 – Franz Ferdinand (2 awards)
- 2006 – Arctic Monkeys (3 awards)
- 2007 – Arctic Monkeys (2 awards)
- 2008 – Arctic Monkeys (3 awards)
- 2009 – MGMT (2 awards)
- 2010 – Muse and Kasabian (2 awards)
- 2011 – My Chemical Romance (2 awards)
- 2012 – Florence and the Machine (2 awards)
- 2013 – Florence and the Machine and the Rolling Stones (2 awards)
- 2014 – Arctic Monkeys (4 awards)
- 2015 – Jamie T and Kasabian (3 awards)
- 2016 – Wolf Alice and the Libertines (2 awards)
- 2017 – Christine and the Queens (2 awards)
- 2018 – Ariana Grande (2 awards)
- 2022 – Sam Fender (2 awards)
