= Nick Jago =

English musician from Abadan and Devon

Nicholas Jago
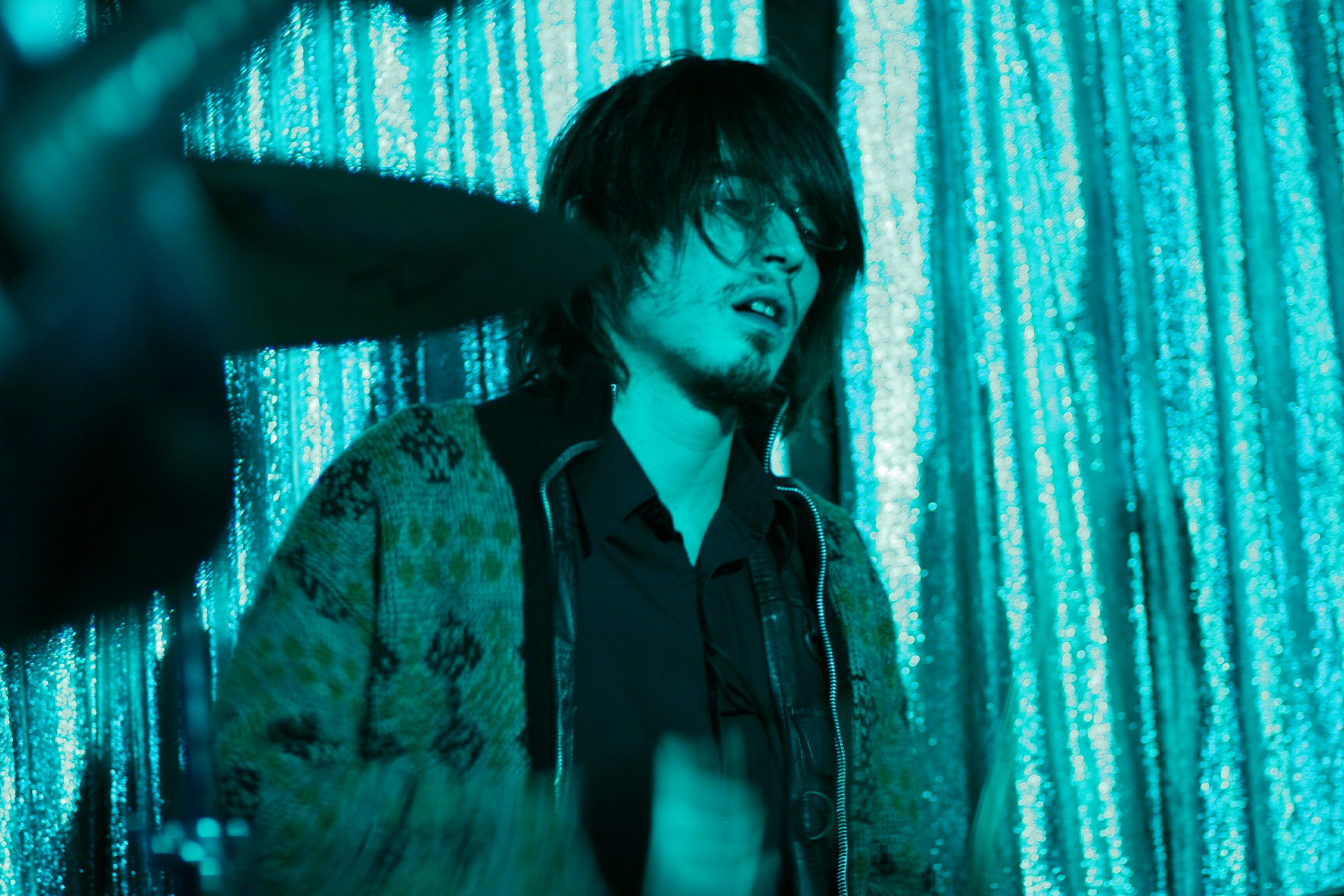
- Nick Jago performing live in 2006 with Black Rebel Motorcycle Club

Background information
- Born: 19 July 1976 (age 50); Abadan, Iran
- Origin: Devon, England
- Genres: Alternative rock; noise rock; garage rock; neo-psychedelia; shoegazing
- Instruments: Drums, guitar, harmonica
- Years active: 1995–present

Nicholas Jago (born 19 July 1976) is an English musician born in Iran, best known as the former drummer and founding member of English-American rock band Black Rebel Motorcycle Club.

== Early life ==
Jago was born in Abadan to an English father and Peruvian mother and grew up in Devon, England. He attended St Cuthbert Mayne School in Torquay then specialized in art and design at South Devon College. He went on to study a degree in Fine Art Painting at the Winchester School of Art in Hampshire. He moved to the San Francisco Bay Area in the United States in 1995 whilst visiting family. He switched his focus to music and joined a band with Robert Levon Been and Peter Hayes. They moved to Los Angeles after garnering music business interest.

== Career ==
Jago was removed from the stage at the 2003 NME Awards during a rather extensive moment of silence on his part while accepting the "Best Video" award for BRMC's "Whatever Happened to My Rock 'n' Roll (Punk Song)". After leaving the group for a period of time, Jago and the band went on to release the album Howl on 22 August 2005 and the follow-up Baby 81 in May 2007.

In June 2008, Jago released a bulletin on MySpace stating that he was leaving the band in order to focus on some personal growth and creative goals.
