= Aorta (band) =

American psychedelic rock band

- Origin: Chicago, Illinois, United States
- Genre: Psychedelic rock
- Years active: 1967–1970
- Labels: Atlantic; Columbia; Happy Tiger
- Past members: Jim Donlinger; Jim Nyeholt; Billy Herman; Bobby Jones; Dan Hoagland; Tom Donlinger; Michael Been

Aorta was an American psychedelic rock band from Chicago that recorded two albums in the late 1960s and early 1970s.

== History ==
The band developed from a soul, pop and rock'n'roll group who had originally formed in Rockford, Illinois in 1962 as Kal David and the Exceptions. Its members were Kal David (b. David Raskin - vocals and guitar), Peter Cetera (bass, vocals), Denny Ebert (drums, vocals), and Marty Grebb (saxophone, keyboards, guitar, vocals). David left in 1965, to join The Rovin' Kind, later to become Illinois Speed Press, and was replaced by James Vincent (b. James Vincent Dondelinger, 8 February 1943, in Chicago; later known as Jim Donlinger). The band was then known as The Exceptions. They released several singles on local labels, and an EP, Rock and Roll Mass, on the Flair label, before Grebb left to join The Buckinghams, being replaced by Jim Nyeholt. Ebert also left to be replaced by Billy Herman. As The Exceptions, Vincent (Donlinger), Cetera, Nyeholt and Herman recorded several singles for Capitol Records, but Cetera left when the other members expressed a desire to perform more psychedelic material. Cetera joined The Big Thing, who became Chicago Transit Authority and then Chicago.

After recruiting Bobby Jones as the new bass player, the group changed their name to Aorta in 1967, for a short period also adding Dan Hoagland (born Daniel Hoogland) on tenor sax. With Jim Donlinger on lead vocals, the band recorded a single, "The Shape Of Things To Come", a song written by Barry Mann and Cynthia Weil and included on the soundtrack to the movie Wild in the Streets by the fictional group Max Frost and the Troopers. Aorta signed to Dunwich Productions, a company formed by Bill Traut, and the single was leased for release on Atlantic Records. Under Traut's management, the band were then signed to Columbia Records to record an album. Their first LP was produced by Traut and Donlinger. Entitled Aorta, it was issued in early 1969, as part of a drive by Columbia to promote "the Chicago sound" - the company simultaneously released albums by Chicago, Illinois Speed Press, and The Flock - and reached No. 167 on the Billboard album chart. The album has been described as a "startling record which was a mix of psychedelia, soul, jazz, folk, and rock... housed in a beautiful, graphic sleeve that has always overshadowed the great music from within.... Aorta is solid throughout, featuring strong musicianship, inventive studio wizardry, superb songs with a healthy dose of fuzz guitar and wonderful string and horn arrangements." In a contrary review, Robert Christgau called it "Badly sung..., full of pretentious production effects [with] silly lyrics" and gave it an "E−" rating, denoting an "organically conceived masterpiece that repays repeated listening with a sense of horror in the face of the void...unlikely to be marred by one listenable cut." Neither the album nor the single "Strange" (a track written by Hoagland before he left the band) c/w "Ode to Missy Mxyzosptlk" achieved significant sales. The group toured in support of bands such as Led Zeppelin, Janis Joplin and The Mothers of Invention, and were given a major showcase opportunity to impress music industry leaders at the Fillmore East in New York City. However, according to Donlinger, the band were offered LSD by another musician before the show, resulting in them giving what was described as a "train wreck" of a performance.

Jones and Herman then left, and Donlinger and Nyeholt, together with Donlinger's drummer brother Tom, temporarily joined the Rotary Connection. However, they then decided to reform Aorta, with the Donlinger brothers and Nyeholt adding Michael Been on bass, guitar and vocals. The band recorded a second album, Aorta 2, in a radically different style, leaning more towards country rock with Christian overtones. They finally split up shortly after its release on the Happy Tiger label in early 1970. Jim Donlinger and Michael Been, together with former Exceptions member Marty Grebb, then joined the band Lovecraft (previously H. P. Lovecraft). Been later formed The Call. Billy Herman went on to perform under the name The Exceptions with lead vocalist and keyboard player Joan Hammel and then with former bandmate's wife, Twyla.

The original Aorta later re-formed to do promotional spots for the U.S. Armed Forces. Their first album, Aorta, was reissued on CD in 1996.

== Discography ==
=== Albums ===
- Aorta (Columbia CS 9785) 1969 - Billboard Top LPs No. 167
- Aorta 2 (Happy Tiger HT-1010) 1970
- Aorta (reissue) (Buy or Die BOD 104) 1996

=== Singles ===
- "Shape of Things to Come" b/w "Strange" (Atlantic 45–2545) 1968
- "Strange" b/w "Ode to Missy Mxyzosptlk" (Columbia 44870) 1969
- "Sand Castles" b/w "Willie Jean" (Happy Tiger 567) 1970
