= Take Them On, On Your Own =

Studio album by Black Rebel Motorcycle Club
- Released: August 25, 2003
- Recorded: 2003
- Genre: Alternative rock; garage rock; noise rock; shoegazing
- Length: 59:01
- Label: Virgin
- Producer: Black Rebel Motorcycle Club

Black Rebel Motorcycle Club chronology
B.R.M.C. (2001)	Take Them On, On Your Own (2003)	Howl (2005)

Singles from Take Them On, On Your Own
- 1. "Stop" Released: August 18, 2003; 2. "We're All in Love" Released: November 17, 2003; 3. "Six Barrel Shotgun" Released: February 2004 (promo only)

Professional ratings
Aggregate scores
Source	Rating
Metacritic	74/100
Review scores
Source	Rating
AllMusic	4/5 stars
Alternative Press	4/5
Blender	3/5 stars
Entertainment Weekly	B
The Guardian	3/5 stars
NME	9/10
Pitchfork	6.9/10
Q	3/5 stars
Rolling Stone	3/5 stars
Uncut	3/5 stars

Take Them On, On Your Own is the second studio album by American rock band Black Rebel Motorcycle Club. It was first released in the UK on August 25, 2003, and in the US on September 2, 2003. The album was reissued with bonus tracks in 2008. The album cover is a homage to the film The Third Man.

The album has a darker, harder rock sound than their debut album, and also contains more politically themed lyrics. The album reached #3 in the United Kingdom music charts despite receiving mixed reviews, and is almost universally credited as a lesser achievement than its predecessor B.R.M.C..

The 2003 release of this album contained the Copy Control protection system in some regions. The 2008 Japanese and European CD reissue contains three bonus tracks: "Take Them On, On Your Own", "High / Low", and "Waiting Here".

== Track listing ==
No.	Title	Length
0.	"Take Them On, On Your Own (pregap hidden track)"	5:27
1.	"Stop"	4:36
2.	"Six Barrel Shotgun"	3:06
3.	"We're All in Love"	3:37
4.	"In Like the Rose"	5:22
5.	"Ha Ha High Babe"	4:12
6.	"Generation"	5:01
7.	"Shade of Blue"	4:22
8.	"US Government"	5:32
9.	"And I'm Aching"	3:52
10.	"Suddenly"	4:56
11.	"Rise or Fall"	3:56
12.	"Going Under"	3:14
13.	"Heart and Soul"	7:15
Total length:		59:01

Japanese 2008 Bonus tracks
No.	Title	Length
14.	"Take Them On, On Your Own"	5:27
15.	"High / Low"	4:03
16.	"Waiting Here"	3:49

== Credits ==
- Bass, Guitar, Vocals – Robert Turner
- Drums, Percussion – Nick Jago
- Guitar, Bass, Vocals – Peter Hayes
- Lyrics by – Peter Hayes, Robert Turner
- Music by – Black Rebel Motorcycle Club
- Engineer – Black Rebel Motorcycle Club, Ric Simpson
- Engineering Assistant – Ben Thackeray
- Mastered by – Mike Lazer
- Mastered by [per etching] – Paul Stubblebine
- Mixed by – Black Rebel Motorcycle Club, Ken Andrews (tracks: 1 to 4, 6, 8, 10 to 13)
- Mixed by (assistant)– Justin Smith (tracks: 1 to 4, 6, 8, 10 to 13)
- Producer – Black Rebel Motorcycle Club
- (additional) Recording by – Ken Andrews

=== Notes ===
- Recorded at Mayfair Studios (in Primrose Hill), B.R.M.C. Studio, and The Fortress (in London).
- Additional recording at Exstacy Recording Studios (in North Hollywood).
  -Comes with lyrics inner sleeves.

== Chart performance ==
Chart (2003)	Peak position
Australian Albums (ARIA)	34
Austrian Albums (Ö3 Austria)	33
Danish Albums (Hitlisten)	24
Dutch Albums (Album Top 100)	75
French Albums (SNEP)	43
German Albums (Offizielle Top 100)	27
Irish Albums (IRMA)	21
Italian Albums (FIMI)	8
New Zealand Albums (RMNZ)	17
Norwegian Albums (VG-lista)	15
Scottish Albums (OCC)	2
Swedish Albums (Sverigetopplistan)	13
Swiss Albums (Schweizer Hitparade)	46
UK Albums (OCC)	3
US Billboard 200	47
