= Beat the Devil's Tattoo =

Studio album by Black Rebel Motorcycle Club
- Released: March 5, 2010
- Recorded: March – November 2009
- Studios: The Basement (Philadelphia, PA)
- Genres: Alternative rock; garage rock revival; blues rock
- Length: 65:08
- Labels: Abstract Dragon; Vagrant; Cobraside
- Producers: Black Rebel Motorcycle Club; Michael Been

Black Rebel Motorcycle Club chronology
The Effects of 333 (2008)	Beat the Devil's Tattoo (2010)	Specter at the Feast (2013)

Singles from Beat the Devil's Tattoo
- 1. "Beat the Devil's Tattoo" Released: February 28, 2010

Professional ratings
Aggregate scores
Source	Rating
Metacritic	63/100
Review scores
Source	Rating
AllMusic	4/5 stars
Drowned in Sound	(8/10)
FILTER	85/100
NME	(4.0/10)
NOW	3/5 Ns
Pitchfork	(4.0/10)
Rolling Stone	3/5 stars
Slant Magazine	4/5 stars
Spin	3.5/5 stars
The Times	3/5 stars

Beat the Devil's Tattoo is the sixth studio album by American rock band Black Rebel Motorcycle Club, released on March 8, 2010, in Europe and on March 9, 2010, in North America. It is the second album on the band's own Abstract Dragon label, in partnership with Vagrant Records and Cooperative Music Group.

== Track listing ==
All songs written by Black Rebel Motorcycle Club.

No.	Title	Length
1.	"Beat the Devil's Tattoo"	3:47
2.	"Conscience Killer"	3:47
3.	"Bad Blood"	5:11
4.	"War Machine"	3:59
5.	"Sweet Feeling"	3:27
6.	"Evol"	5:53
7.	"Mama Taught Me Better"	4:46
8.	"River Styx"	3:55
9.	"The Toll"	3:38
10.	"Aya"	5:39
11.	"Shadow's Keeper"	6:12
12.	"Long Way Down"	4:34
13.	"Half-State"	10:20
Total length:		65:08

Japanese edition (bonus tracks)
No.	Title	Length
14.	"Annabel Lee"	4:07
15.	"1:51"	5:35
Total length:		74:44

== Personnel ==
- Peter Hayes - vocals, guitar, bass guitar, harmonica, keyboards
- Robert Levon Been - vocals, guitar, bass guitar, piano
- Leah Shapiro - drums, percussion

== Chart performance ==
Chart (2010)	Peak position
Australian Albums (ARIA)	50
Austrian Albums (Ö3 Austria)	49
Belgian Albums (Ultratop Flanders)	82
Belgian Albums (Ultratop Wallonia)	59
French Albums (SNEP)	76
German Albums (Offizielle Top 100)	60
Irish Albums (IRMA)	66
Scottish Albums (Official Charts)	41
Swiss Albums (Schweizer Hitparade)	44
UK Albums (Official Charts)	58
US Billboard 200	58
US Alternative Albums (Billboard)	9
US Independent Albums (Billboard)	4
US Rock Albums (Billboard)	14

== In popular culture ==
Conscience Killer appears in Need for Speed: Hot Pursuit. The title track was featured prominently in the fourth season episode Chuck Versus the Cubic Z of the TV show Chuck and in Need for Speed: The Run. Also in the TV show Human Target episode "A Problem Like Maria", and the 2018 video game Far Cry 5. The song was also featured in the original trailer for the TV show Longmire.

Mama Taught Me Better was used in the soundtrack for the video game NASCAR 2011: The Game and NHL 11.

The title track was used by writer/director Bobcat Goldthwait in his 2011 dark comedy film God Bless America. It has also been used in the 2012 film End of Watch and in Where the Trail Ends and "River Styx" was used in the UK TV Series Peaky Blinders (Series Two, Episode Six and Series Four, Episode Four).

"River Styx" was included on the 2014 basketball game, NBA 2K15.

The title track was also used in the "Pathfinders" trailer for the 2017 strategy video game Endless Space 2.

The title track was used in the fourth episode of the third season of the American TV Show Preacher which is aired on AMC.

The title track was used by director Neil Marshall in his 2019 reboot film Hellboy.

The title track was used in the War in the Pacific Official Trailer for the video game Battlefield V.
