= Specter at the Feast =

Studio album by Black Rebel Motorcycle Club
- Released: March 18, 2013
- Recorded: 2012
- Studios: Various: 606 (Los Angeles, CA); The Station House (Los Angeles, CA); Rancho De La Luna (Joshua Tree, CA); Boulder Creek Post Office (Santa Cruz, CA); The Gloryhole (Los Angeles, CA)
- Genres: Alternative rock; indie rock; psychedelic rock; blues rock; post-punk revival
- Length: 58:42
- Labels: Abstract Dragon; Vagrant; Cobraside
- Producers: Ethan Allen; Black Rebel Motorcycle Club; Chris Goss; Nic Jodoin; Michael Patterson; Mark Rains

Black Rebel Motorcycle Club chronology
Beat the Devil's Tattoo (2010)	Specter at the Feast (2013)	Wrong Creatures (2018)

Professional ratings
Aggregate scores
Source	Rating
Metacritic	65/100
Review scores
Source	Rating
AllMusic	4/5 stars
Austin Chronicle	3.5/5 stars
Consequence of Sound	D
Drowned in Sound	(7/10)
The Guardian	4/5 stars
musicOMH	2.5/5 stars
NME	(7/10)
Paste	(8.0/10.0)
Pitchfork	(5.1/10.0)
Under the Radar	6.5/10 stars

Specter at the Feast is the seventh studio album by American rock band Black Rebel Motorcycle Club, released on March 18, 2013 in Europe and March 19, 2013 in the US. It was released under the band's own record label, Abstract Dragon, through Vagrant Records. Unlike Beat The Devil's Tattoo, the album was not produced by Michael Been, who died after he suffered a heart attack mid-tour in 2010 while the band was playing at Pukkelpop. As a result, Specter at the Feast was a way for the band to mourn their loss and rid the pain, as he was the father of bassist Robert Levon Been, but also their live sound technician and a mentor to all the members.

The band's first single from the album, a cover of The Call's 1989 hit "Let the Day Begin", available as a free download on their official website. The same day, the song became Q's track of the day. The band have also released the "Let the Day Begin" EP for free, consisting of the single and the album track "Returning", which has also been made available for streaming on the official website.

The band have released a six-part promotional short film documenting the recording of Specter at the Feast.

== Track listing ==
No.	Title	Length
1.	"Fire Walker"	6:23
2.	"Let the Day Begin"	4:06
3.	"Returning"	5:34
4.	"Lullaby"	4:36
5.	"Hate the Taste"	3:50
6.	"Rival"	3:37
7.	"Teenage Disease"	3:22
8.	"Some Kind of Ghost"	3:51
9.	"Sometimes the Light"	3:20
10.	"Funny Games"	4:38
11.	"Sell It"	6:46
12.	"Lose Yourself"	8:39

== Personnel ==
- Peter Hayes - vocals, guitar, bass guitar, harmonica, keyboards
- Robert Levon Been - vocals, guitar, bass guitar, piano
- Leah Shapiro - drums, percussion, backing vocals

== Charts ==
Chart (2013)	Peak position
Austrian Albums (Ö3 Austria)	39
Belgian Albums (Ultratop Flanders)	65
Belgian Albums (Ultratop Wallonia)	54
Danish Albums (Hitlisten)	27
Dutch Albums (Album Top 100)	55
German Albums (Offizielle Top 100)	67
Irish Albums (IRMA)	67
Scottish Albums (Official Charts)	21
Swiss Albums (Schweizer Hitparade)	32
UK Albums (Official Charts)	31
US Billboard 200	35
