= Bones: Original Television Soundtrack =

Soundtrack album by Various Artists (Bones)
- Released: 2 September 2008, Amazon.com
- Genre: Television Soundtrack
- Producer: Maria Alonte McCoy and Billy Gottlieb

Bones: Original Television Soundtrack is a soundtrack album featuring music from the hit FOX television series "Bones." It was released in September 2008, in conjunction with the DVD release of the third season of the show, shortly before the fourth season premiered.

The remix of the theme song titled "DJ Corporate Remix" was previously available online under the name "Squints Remix," referencing main character Seeley Booth's nickname for the Jeffersonian lab technicians, squints. Every song on the soundtrack (except for the remix of the theme song at the end) was featured in the first three seasons of the show, mostly from the music used in the ending montages of important episodes.

== Track listing ==
1. "Bones Theme" — The Crystal Method
2. "Angel" — Sinéad O'Connor
3. "Running Up That Hill" — Placebo
4. "It Means Nothing" — Stereophonics
5. "Gone" — Thirteen Senses
6. "Black Star" — Eliza Lumley
7. "Feel It Now" — Black Rebel Motorcycle Club
8. "Fountain" — Sara Lov
9. "Something" — Cary Brothers
10. "Tears and Laughter" — Tall Tree 6Ft. Man
11. "Bring on the Wonder" — Susan Enan (Featuring Sarah McLachlan)
12. "Dirty Little Secret (Thievery Corporation Remix)" - Sarah McLachlan
13. "Bones Theme (DJ Corporate Remix)" - The Crystal Method
14. "The Gilded Hand" - Radical Face
