= Things to Come (disambiguation) =

Things to Come is a 1936 British black-and-white science fiction film written by H. G. Wells.

Things to Come may also refer to:

- Things to Come (2016 film) (French title: L'Avenir), a French-German drama
- Things to Come (Peter Schilling album), 1985
- Things to Come (Rez Abbasi album), 2009

== See also ==
- Shape of Things to Come (disambiguation)
