= Shape of Things to Come (song) =

Single by Max Frost and the Troopers

Single by Max Frost and the Troopers

from the album Shape of Things to Come
- B-side: "Free Lovin'"
- Released: May 1968
- Length: 1:57
- Label: Tower
- Songwriters: Barry Mann, Cynthia Weil
- Producer: Mike Curb

Max Frost and the Troopers singles chronology
"There Is a Party Going On" (1968)	"Shape of Things to Come" (1968)	"Fifty Two Percent" (1968)

"Shape of Things to Come"

Single by Slade

from the album Play It Loud
- B-side: "C'mon C'mon"
- Released: March 6, 1970
- Length: 2:19
- Label: Fontana
- Songwriters: Barry Mann, Cynthia Weil
- Producer: Chas Chandler

Slade singles chronology
"Wild Winds Are Blowing" (1969)	"Shape of Things to Come" (1970)	"Know Who You Are" (1970)

"Shape of Things to Come" is a song written by Barry Mann and Cynthia Weil from the film Wild in the Streets, performed by the fictional band Max Frost and the Troopers on their 1968 album Shape of Things to Come, featuring a lead vocal by Harley Hatcher. The song was also released without vocals by Davie Allan and the Arrows. The song was a mere 1 minute 55 seconds in length. The song came some 35 years after H. G. Wells' The Shape of Things to Come.

== Success ==
The song was produced by Mike Curb for the exploitation film Wild in the Streets, where actor Christopher Jones lip syncs to Hatcher's vocal. A young Richard Pryor portrayed the drummer in Jones's band. The film was released on May 29, 1968.

Concurrent with the film's release, the song appeared as a single on Tower 419; it was backed by another song from the film, "Free Lovin'" (written by Guy Hemric and Paul Wibier). The single peaked at #22 on the Billboard Hot 100 in September 1968, and peaked at #2 on the Canadian CHUM Charts for two consecutive weeks during the second and third week of October, 1968. and #9 on the Canadian RPM Top 100. The song remained on the US Billboard charts for a total of 12 weeks and on the RPM charts for 12 weeks.

The song subsequently appeared as the first track on the A side of the Shape of Things to Come LP, released in the wake of the single's chart success.

== Other versions ==
Others who have performed the song include:

- George Benson
- Slade (1970 single from Play It Loud album)
- Rich Kids
- Aorta
- The Graduates (1968 GNP Crescendo single)
- Third Rail
- Paul Revere and the Raiders
- Glad
- The Pointed Sticks
- The Ramones
- The Fuzztones
- The Urinals
- The Diodes
- Mod Fun
- Roslyn Kind
- The Vice Barons
- Future
- Vivian Reed
- Davie Allan and the Arrows
- Marshmallow Overcoat

More recently, the song has been released by:

- Thee Dirtybeats
- Toxic Reasons
- Hammer and the Nails
- Janelle Monáe

== In popular culture ==
- The song was used in the Mexican television show Ensalada de locos (1971 - 1973) among sketches.
- In 2006, the Max Frost & The Troopers version of the song was used in an advertising campaign by Target Stores.
- In 2021, the original version was again used in an advertising campaign by mobile payments company Square Inc.
- In 2022, the original version was used in the film Apollo 10 1/2: A Space Age Childhood.

== See also ==
- Wild in the Streets at IMDb
