= Howl (Black Rebel Motorcycle Club album) =

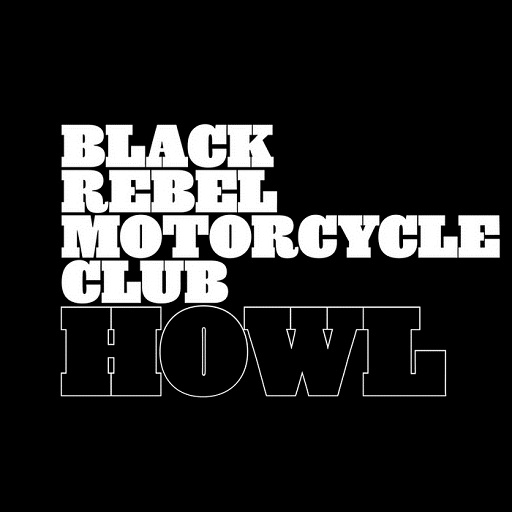

Studio album by Black Rebel Motorcycle Club
- Released: August 22, 2005
- Recorded: 2005
- Studio: Sandbox (Los Angeles, CA); The Cobb (Philadelphia, PA)
- Genre: Folk rock; blues rock; Americana; indie rock; country blues; gospel
- Length: 54:47
- Label: RCA; Echo
- Producer: Black Rebel Motorcycle Club

Black Rebel Motorcycle Club chronology
Take Them On, On Your Own (2003)	Howl (2005)	Baby 81 (2007)

Singles from Howl
- 1. "Shuffle Your Feet" Released: July 19, 2005; 2. "Ain't No Easy Way" Released: August 15, 2005; 3. "Weight of the World" Released: October 18, 2005

Howl is the third studio album by American rock band Black Rebel Motorcycle Club. It was released on August 22, 2005 in the UK, August 23 in the US, and September 21 in Japan. The record was released in the UK and Europe by The Echo Label and by RCA in the US, Australia, Japan, and the rest of the world. The title of the record is a direct reference to Allen Ginsberg's poem "Howl".

== Critical reception ==
Professional ratings
Aggregate scores
Source	Rating
Metacritic	70/100
Review scores
Source	Rating
AllMusic	4/5 stars
Entertainment Weekly	A−
The Guardian	4/5 stars
Los Angeles Times	3/4 stars
Mojo	4/5 stars
NME	7/10
Pitchfork	7.0/10
Q	4/5 stars
Rolling Stone	3/5 stars
Spin	B

Many critics noted that Howl took a different direction from earlier BRMC releases. Critics were generally polarised with the album. While most agreed that their 2001 debut was the better of the first two records, and the follow-up had been rushed and lacklustre, opinion of the third offering was not so unified. Many critics saw the album as an innovative departure from the band's homeground, and the record that affirmed them as the "Kings of Cool" once again, while others professed the record dull, and a last-minute attempt at restoring a flagging career by an album of acoustic tracks that should have ended up as b-sides.

In an August 2018 issue of NME dedicated to great "lost" or "cult" albums, Howl was selected by Guy Garvey of the band Elbow as his favorite "lost" album.

== Singles ==
Black Rebel Motorcycle Club had claimed that they signed to The Echo Label in order to release more singles from their albums, having only been allowed to release two from their previous album, Take Them On, On Your Own. Despite this, their first single from Howl, album opener "Shuffle Your Feet", was a download-only single, therefore (at the time) not eligible to chart. Following this, they released "Ain't No Easy Way", the most recognizable and popular song from the record. Noticeably after this, the proposed third single from the album, "Weight of the World", never materialized, with only a limited number of copies surfacing, again non-chart eligible.

== Track listing ==
All tracks are written by Peter Hayes and Robert Levon Been.

No.	Title	Lead vocals	Length
1.	"Shuffle Your Feet"	Hayes	2:53
2.	"Howl"	Been	4:20
3.	"Devil's Waitin'"	Hayes	3:50
4.	"Ain't No Easy Way"	Hayes	2:36
5.	"Still Suspicion Holds You Tight"	Hayes	4:24
6.	"Fault Line"	Hayes	2:57
7.	"Promise"	Been	4:46
8.	"Weight of the World"	Been	3:41
9.	"Restless Sinner"	Hayes	3:11
10.	"Gospel Song"	Been	4:31
11.	"Complicated Situation"	Hayes	2:37
12.	"Sympathetic Noose"	Been	4:17
13.	"The Line" (contains hidden track "Open Invitation" at 5:09)	Been/Hayes	8:14

== The Howl sessions EP ==
An additional six-song EP was released in 2006 featuring unreleased tracks from the Howl sessions:

1. "Grind My Bones"
2. "Mercy"
3. "Wishing Well"
4. "Steal a Ride"
5. "Feel It Now"
6. "Pretend"

== Chart performance ==
Chart (2005)	Peak position
Australian Albums (ARIA)	34
Austrian Albums (Ö3 Austria)	45
Belgian Albums (Ultratop Flanders)	42
Belgian Albums (Ultratop Wallonia)	61
Danish Albums (Hitlisten)	35
Dutch Albums (Album Top 100)	47
French Albums (SNEP)	83
German Albums (Offizielle Top 100)	33
Irish Albums (IRMA)	29
Italian Albums (FIMI)	57
Scottish Albums (OCC)	25
Swedish Albums (Sverigetopplistan)	27
Swiss Albums (Schweizer Hitparade)	50
UK Albums (OCC)	14
UK Independent Albums (OCC)	1
US Billboard 200	90
