= Max Frost and the Troopers =

Rock band

Max Frost and the Troopers were a fictional rock music group created for the exploitation film Wild in the Streets, released in 1968. The film featured Christopher Jones as the highly influential singer Max Frost. The songs performed by Frost and his band, a group that was never formally named in the film, were credited to Max Frost and the Troopers in the subsequent singles and album. The band name "Troopers" is based on the term "troops", the designation Frost used in the film to refer to his friends and followers.

A studio group (or possibly The 13th Power) appeared on the soundtrack album for the film, along with incidental music penned by Cynthia Weil and Barry Mann and composed by Les Baxter; however, the songs were not originally credited to Max Frost and the Troopers, but rather to The 13th Power.

Owing to the success of the song "Shape of Things to Come" as a single, an accompanying album by Max Frost and The Troopers, Shape of Things to Come, was issued on the Tower record label in 1968. Musicians playing on the album were at first believed to include members of Davie Allan and The Arrows (who also released the "Shapes of Things to Come" without lyrics) with lead vocals by Paul Wibier (who also wrote a majority of the songs on the album), however, there is reason to believe that the album was actually the work of Wibier's own group, The 13th Power, who had previously recorded for Curb under the name The Moms. The music is high-energy rock with some psychedelic touches.

The group was produced by Harley Hatcher and Eddie Beram for Mike Curb Productions. Their first single was recorded with Curb's Tower subsidiary Sidewalk Records. Subsequent singles were taken from their album.

Their final single, "Sittin' in Circles", was performed in the film Three in the Attic by Davie Allan and the Arrows. The B-side of that single, "Paxton Quigley's Had The Course", was a Chad & Jeremy composition.

The soundtrack album for the 1968 film The Glory Stompers, starring Dennis Hopper, contains two additional songs credited to Max Frost and the Troopers: "There's A Party Going On" (which was released as their first single) and "You Might Want Me Baby".

Later, "Wild In The Streets: Original Motion Picture Soundtrack" was released, which included the singles from the original "Shape of Things to Come" LP and an additional four songs: "Wild in the Streets", "Listen to Music", "Love to Be Your Man", and "Fourteen or Fight!". A European release of the Shape of Things to Come album, released in 2014 on the Captain High label, includes the entirety of the Wild in the Streets soundtrack album as bonus tracks.

Cultural historian Greil Marcus borrowed the Troopers' song title for his 2006 book "The Shape of Things to Come: Prophecy & The American Voice".

== Discography ==
=== Albums ===
- Wild in the Streets (Original Motion Picture Soundtrack) (5 songs as The 13th Power, Tower 5099, 1968)
- Shape of Things to Come Tower ST-5147 (1968)

=== Singles ===
- "There Is a Party Going On" / "Stomper's Ride" Sidewalk 938 (1968)
- "Shape of Things to Come" / "Free Lovin'" Tower 419 (1968) US Billboard #22 Canada (RPM) #9
- "Fifty Two Per Cent" / "Max Frost Theme" Tower 452 (1968) US Billboard #123
- "Paxton Quigley's Had the Course / "Sittin' in Circles" Tower 478 (1969)

=== Compilation appearances ===
- "Shape of Things to Come" was featured on the 1985 compilation Nuggets Volume 12 (Punk Part Three)

=== Advertisements ===
- Beginning in 2005, "Shape of Things to Come" was used as the theme song to TV commercial advertisements for the Target Corporation chain of department stores.
