= Baby 81 incident =

Parental identity dispute in 2004

- Born: October 19, 2004; Sri Lanka

The Baby 81 incident was a widely reported parental identity dispute about a baby who survived the 2004 Indian Ocean earthquake and became an emblem of the effect of the disaster on the families involved. Many of the details in initial reports of the events were subsequently disputed.

== Overview ==
The baby, around 2 months old, was reportedly found on the beach of the town of Kalmunai on the day of the disaster, 26 December 2004, in the midst of debris caused by the tsunami. Kalmunai is located in Ampara district on the east coast of Sri Lanka, approximately 180 miles east of Colombo. No relatives were found in the vicinity, so he was taken to Kalmunai hospital. He was said to be the 81st victim taken to that hospital after the tsunami hit Sri Lanka, and so named Baby 81.

After remaining unclaimed for several days, nine couples were reported to have said that the child was theirs, although this was later disputed. After initial attempts to take custody of the baby were blocked by the hospital, the Jeyarajah family took legal action to prove the baby's identity, claiming that he was their four-month-old son, Abhilasha. They described how the boy had slipped from his mother's arms when the waves hit, and how the documents of his birth, along with all their other possessions, were washed away in the disaster.

On 2 February 2005, the courts ordered DNA tests of both the baby and the couple in an attempt to resolve the case. 'Gene Tech', the only available facility in Sri Lanka, conducted the testing. The judge stated that the court would reconvene with the results on 20 April 2005, though hoped an earlier date may be set. Hearing this, the couple, along with over 70 supporters, attempted to take the child from the hospital – the pair were arrested for assault and criminal trespass. On 9 February 2005, escorted by nurses, police and a court official, the baby was taken to Colombo to undergo the tests. On 14 February 2005, the results of the tests confirmed the couple's claim, and the family were permitted to take the child home on 16 February. It was later reported that only one couple had claimed the baby at the hospital, and that the press circus surrounding the baby was blamed for delaying his return to his family.

The family was flown to New York City to appear on American Broadcasting Company's Good Morning America show in March 2005. They returned to Sri Lanka, but found themselves denied local disaster relief, as many thought they had received assistance in the US. The family had not been paid for their American television appearance. They later moved to Batticaloa, capital of Sri Lanka's Eastern Province, to escape the label of being called the "tsunami family". As of 2024, the baby from the incident is 20 years old, and is planning on studying information technology at a university.
