= The Shape of Things to Come =

1933 novel by H. G. Wells

- First edition dust jacket
- Author: H. G. Wells
- Language: English
- Genre: Future history Science fiction
- Publisher: Hutchinson (UK); Macmillan (US)
- Publication date: September 1933
- Publication place: United Kingdom
- Media type: Print

The Shape of Things to Come is a science fiction novel written by the British writer H. G. Wells published in 1933. It takes the form of a future history that ends in 2106.

== Synopsis ==
A long economic slump causes a major war that leaves Europe devastated and threatened by the plague. The chaos caused by the slump returns much of the world to medieval conditions. Pilots and technicians that formerly served in various nations' air forces maintain a network of functioning airfields. Around this nucleus, technological civilization is rebuilt, with the pilots and other skilled technicians eventually seizing worldwide power and sweeping away the remnants of the old nation states. A benevolent dictatorship is set up, paving the way for world peace by abolishing national divisions, enforcing the English language, promoting scientific learning, and outlawing religion. The enlightened world-citizens are able to depose the dictators peacefully and go on to breed a new race of super-talents, able to maintain a permanent utopia.

== Analysis ==
=== Overview ===
Though his story is a work of fiction, several of Wells' short-term predictions from The Shape of Things to Come would come true, such as the aerial bombing of whole cities (which was presented in more detail than in his previous book The War in the Air) and the eventual development of weapons of mass destruction. Others, such as the withering of state-power and the dissolution of Islam, have not come to pass.

A frame story claims that the book is Wells' edited version of notes written by an eminent diplomat, Dr. Philip Raven, who had been having dream visions of a history textbook published in 2106 and wrote down what he could recall of it. It is split into five "books." The first of these details history from the Great War to 1933. In late 1933 or early 1934, US President Franklin D. Roosevelt's failure to implement the New Deal and revive the US economy, and Adolf Hitler's failure to revive the German economy by rearmament, cause the worldwide economic crisis to continue for thirty years, concurrently with a Second World War – a war fought between countries already on the verge of economic collapse, which is hastened by the war.

Wells' Second World War breaks out in January 1940 with a European conflagration from the flashpoint of a violent clash between Germans and Poles at Danzig – closely matching the actual outbreak of WWII. However, Wells's imagined war sharply diverges from the actual war when Poland proves a military match for Germany. The inconclusive war lasts ten years. Other countries are eventually dragged into the fighting, though France and the Soviet Union are only marginally involved. The United Kingdom remains neutral and the United States fights with Japan to indecisive effect on both sides. The Austrian Anschluss happens during, rather than before, the war. Czechoslovakia avoids German occupation. Its President, Edvard Beneš, survives to initiate the final Suspension of Hostilities in 1950.

Wells' prediction was off the mark with regard to Spain. In Wells' history, Spain stays out of the violent passions sweeping Europe. In actuality, the Spanish Civil War – a particular strong manifestation of these violent passions – would begin two years after the book's publication. He correctly predicted that the coming war would involve both sides launching heavy bombings of each other's main cities. His depiction of the destroyed Unter Den Linden closely predicted its actual fate in the war. However, Wells wrongly thought that land fighting would quickly bog down, as in World War I, and that tanks would prove completely ineffective.

In Wells' future, submarines become the launching pads for "air torpedoes" (submarine-launched ballistic missiles) carrying weapons of mass destruction. This enables nations to threaten the destruction of places halfway around the world. This would not come true in World War II, but instead in later decades.

The Second World War ends with no victor but total exhaustion, collapse and disintegration of both involved and neutral countries, all affected by the deepening economic crisis. Nearly all governments break down, and a devastating plague in 1955 and 1956 kills approximately half of humanity. Civilization nearly ends.

A benevolent dictatorship, the Dictatorship of the Air, arises from the controllers of the world's surviving transport systems, who are the only people with global power. The dictatorship promotes science, enforces Basic English as a global lingua franca and eradicates all religions, setting the world on the road to a utopia. When the dictatorship chooses to execute a subject, the condemned is given a chance to take a poison tablet modeled on the hemlock given to Socrates.

The achievement of a classless society is not via a Marxist dictatorship of the proletariat, which Wells rejected. Rather, the working class is "pulled upwards" and eliminated in several generations of upward social mobility, leaving a humanity entirely composed of "middle class intellectuals". The limited amount of physical labor still needed is performed by the world's youth, who undergo two years of "labor conscription" instead of military conscription, which is no longer needed.

After around a hundred years, the Dictatorship of the Air is overthrown in a bloodless coup. The former rulers are sent into honorable retirement and the world state "withers away". The last part of the book details the utopian world that emerges. The aim of this utopian world is to produce a world society made up entirely of polymaths, every one of its members being the intellectual equal of the greatest geniuses of the past.

=== Suppression of religion ===
A major aspect of the creation of the World State is the abolition of all organized religion, a step deemed indispensable to giving the emerging "Modern State" a monopoly over education and the complete ability to mold new generations of humanity.

The abolition of Islam is carried out by the Air Police, who "descend upon Mecca and close down the main holy places", apparently without major incident. Islam later disappears, its demise accelerated by the decay of Arabic and its replacement by "an expanded English". Some twenty mosques survive, deemed to be worthy of preservation on architectural grounds. The Lebanese-American scholar George Nasser remarked on this aspect of Wells's book: "In the 1979 imagined by H.G. Wells, a self-appointed ruling elite composed mainly of Westerners, with one Chinese and one Black African and not a single Arab member, would establish itself in the Arab and Muslim city of Basra and calmly take the decision to completely extinguish and extirpate the Muslim religion... In the 1979 of real history, Khomeini's Islamic Republic of Iran came into being". Wells's speculations, which may well seem absurd from a more modern point of view, can be much better understood under the impression of the establishment and attempted suppression of Islam in Turkey under Atatürk in the 1920s and 1930s.

There is only a brief reference to the abolition of Buddhism and no reference to any serious problems encountered by the Modern State in eradicating it from East Asia.

The most prolonged and formidable religious opposition envisaged by Wells is from the Catholic Church (there is little reference to Protestants). The Pope and the Catholic hierarchy are gassed unconscious when they bless new aircraft, built by a revived Fascist Italy. Though this was not official policy but a rash action by the local commander, this incident makes the Modern State realize its mission inherently requires abolishing religion, and sparks the rest of the religious suppression mentioned in the book. After the Catholic Church is decisively crushed in Italy, it finds refuge in Ireland, "the last bastion of Christianity". When it is subdued there also, the resistance is maintained only in Latin America, under "a coloured Pope in Pernambuco". This too is suppressed.

Wells gives considerable attention to the fate of the Jews. In this history, an enfeebled Nazi Germany is incapable of systematic murder on the scale of The Holocaust. However, Jews greatly suffer from "unorganized" persecution. Anti-Jewish pogroms happen "everywhere in Europe" during the chaotic 1950s. Then, in a world where all nation-states are a doomed anachronism, Zionism and its ambition to create a new state come to naught. In the later struggle between the emerging world state and its opponents, Jews are caught between the proverbial hammer and anvil. Following the launch of its antireligious campaign, the Modern State closes down all kosher butcheries still in operation, while the opening act of the "Federated Nationalist" rebels opposing the Modern State is to perpetrate a pogrom against Jews in the Frankfurt area. Eventually, in Wells's vision, it is the Modern State's forced assimilation that triumphs. The Jews, who had resisted earlier pressures, become absorbed in the general society and lose their separate identity.

=== Democracy, fascism and communism ===
In the 1930s, especially after the collapse of the Weimar Republic and the rise of Nazi Germany, the survival of European democracy seemed in doubt. Wells, not a great supporter of democracy even in its more robust times, clearly shared that outlook. The book notes that at the outbreak of war in 1940, France was "still" a parliamentary democracy, the implication being that of an anachronistic government. The visionary Gustave de Windt, setting out the blueprint for the coming "Modern State", rejects "The Principle of Opposition", which by definition rules out parliamentary democracy.

Wells's future history remembers fascism more as ridiculous and stupid than as horrible. As mentioned above, Nazi Germany gets bogged down in its war with Poland, never to achieve conquests or the Holocaust. It collapses and disintegrates. No mention is made of Hitler's fate. Nazism disappears without a trace. An attempt to revive Italian Fascism is easily swept away by the triumphant Modern State. The book notes that many people who were Fascists or Nazis in their early years had become staunch adherents of the Modern State in the more mature part of their lives.

The future remembers Stalin as narrow and limited but not as a bloody dictator. The Soviet Union is less affected than other countries by the chaos of the late 1940s and the 1950s. With the rise of the Modern State, Russia has a bloodless takeover by the pilots and other skilled technicians, who displace the Communist Party bureaucrats. It assimilates into the new worldwide state. During the transition, the hammer and sickle are displayed side by side with the Modern State's Winged Disk.

Altogether, of the three competing systems of government (democracy, fascism and communism), only the last would be remembered by Wells's Modern State as having been a predecessor.

=== The Death of Socrates ===
When the Modern State finds it necessary to sentence people to death, the condemned person is given a lethal "tabloid" and is allowed to choose the moment and the location for taking it. Death by the tabloid is instantaneous and painless. Though not explicitly mentioned, this aspect of Wells' vision of the future was clearly inspired by the well-known episode of the end of the philosopher Socrates, who – when condemned to death in ancient Athens – took hemlock and died, surrounded by his friends and discoursing of philosophy to his last moment.

=== Use of "C.E." ===
The book displays one of the earliest uses of the label "C.E." on calendar years in place of the more common AD ("Anno Domini"). Wells states that his use of "C.E." stands for "Christian Era", but in common parlance, the abbreviation is now more usually understood to mean "Common Era".

=== Railways ===
Wells' elite, in its efforts to rebuild the ruined world, takes "in a single afternoon" the decision not to revive the railways. Instead, a vast network of nine-lane super-highways is constructed across Europe – not a complete success, since the predicted vast motor traffic never emerges to make use of these highways. The idea that railways were an anachronism to be gotten rid of was common in the 1930's, but later there was a renewed appreciation of the advantages of the railway.

== Relation to Brave New World ==
As noted by Nathaniel Ward, The Shape of Things to Come was published two years after Aldous Huxley's Brave New World. In both works, a war leaves the world in ruins, a self-appointed elite takes over, rebuilds the world and engages in social engineering to refashion human society. Wells notes that as Huxley, "one of the most brilliant of the reactionary writers, foretold of them, [the leaders of the Dictatorship of the Air] tidied up the world".

The crucial difference is the society envisioned by Huxley is highly hierarchical, with intelligent "Alphas" on top and moronic "Epsilons" at the bottom, Huxley arguing that a society composed purely of the assertive and competitive "Alphas" would dissolve into chaos and all-out fighting. It was that vision that Wells believed would cause Huxley to be remembered by posterity as a "reactionary writer". Much of The Shape of Things to Come is devoted to demonstrating that given time, an elite with control of world education can make such a society of intelligent and assertive "Alphas" harmonious and functional, without an underclass.

== Adaptations ==
Wells loosely adapted the novel into a screenplay entitled Things to Come. Produced by Alexander Korda and directed by William Cameron Menzies, the film was released in 1936. It also takes elements from Wells's non-fiction book The Work, Wealth and Happiness of Mankind (1931).

H. G. Wells' The Shape of Things to Come, a low-budget Canadian space opera film first released in May 1979, presented itself as a sequel and adaptation. Apart from the name of two characters named "Caball" (named after Cabal in the film Things to Come), it has no connection with the film or book.

The audio drama production Big Finish Productions released a 2017 audio adaptation based loosely on Wells' book. It was adapted by Guy Adams, starred Nicola Walker and Sam Troughton, and was directed by Lisa Bowerman. This version presented the future history as an alternative timeline which Raven is shown, versus dreams, as in the original.

== American Golden Age writers ==
Theodore Wein pointed out that "Wells' Things to Come was at its most influential in the six years between its publication and the moment when the course of its predicted war was overtaken and overshadowed by the actual fast-unfolding events of the Second World War. These same years of the 1930s were the time of incubation for the people who were destined to become the greatest names in Science Fiction, the time when they read ravenously any SF on which they could lay their hands and started to formulate their own ideas. It is not surprising that traces of Things to Come are clearly visible in what they wrote in the 1940s and 1950s." Among such great names of Golden Age Science Fiction, Wein noted Isaac Asimov, Robert Heinlein and Poul Anderson, and enumerated ways in which the work of all three, and other science fiction writers as well, had felt the influence of Wells' work.

Specifically, Wein speculated that Wells' character of social scientist Gustave De Windt, with his blueprint for world transformation, had inspired Asimov's Hari Seldon. As noted by Wein, De Windt and Seldon both conduct research at a prestigious library in the capital of a declining empire (respectively the British Empire and the Galactic Empire). Both realize that an overall collapse is imminent and inevitable, set out a detailed blueprint of how to rebuild the world/galaxy, and set up a body of dedicated followers (Wells' Modern State Society, Asimov's First and Second Foundations) which will implement the plan of the founding visionary for generations after his death. Further, Wein conjectured that Wells' "seventeen million active workers" tasked with a "Fundamental Knowledge System" containing "everything that is known" had inspired Asimov's Encyclopedia Galactica.

In Heinlein's "Solution Unsatisfactory" (1941), the planes of the International Patrol overfly Washington D.C., and put to naught the President's authority – an event similar to an episode earlier depicted in Wells' work. Heinlein would later upgrade the International Patrol into an Interplanetary Patrol, a self-appointed elite of motivated and puritanical spacemen reminiscent of Wells' Dictatorship of the Air.

Wells described Federated Nationalists, who had put aside their feuds to band together until they had smashed the budding world government. Poul Anderson in his early future history, the Psychotechnic League, had similar federated nationalists opposing the United Nations' efforts to make itself a world government and rebuild a war torn world.

=== Other works ===
Rex Warner's dystopian The Aerodrome (1941) is in part a literary critique of The Shape of Things to Come. Wells' Air Police is presented as the fascistic "Airmen".

=== Adoption of title ===
The title phrase The Shape of Things to Come has been adopted and modified by several artists (directly or indirectly) to fit their own purposes, among them:

- The Shape of Jazz to Come, a jazz album from 1959 by Ornette Coleman
- The Shape of Punk to Come, an album by the band Refused from 1998

For some direct reuse of the title, see the disambiguation page for Shape of Things to Come.
