= American X: Baby 81 Sessions EP =

American X: Baby 81 Sessions

EP by Black Rebel Motorcycle Club
- Released: December 4, 2007
- Recorded: 2006–2007
- Genres: Alternative rock, garage rock, indie rock
- Length: 31:15
- Labels: RCA, RED Distribution

Black Rebel Motorcycle Club chronology
Baby 81 (2007)	American X: Baby 81 Sessions (2007)	The Effects of 333 (2008)

American X: Baby 81 Sessions is an EP by American rock band Black Rebel Motorcycle Club, released in the US on December 4, 2007. The CD collects B-sides and unreleased tracks from the Baby 81 recording sessions along with a new short film for the song "American X." Initially, the CD was only released at indie record stores in the US, but was made available internationally shortly thereafter.

== Track listing ==
1. "The Likes of You" - 5:11
2. "Vision" - 5:01
3. "The Show's About to Begin" - 5:02
4. "MK Ultra" - 4:26
5. "Whenever You're Ready" - 3:12
6. "20 Hours" - 5:04
7. "Last Chance for Love" - 4:01
8. "American X" (short film) - 9:28

== Info ==
- "The Likes of You" was a bonus track on the UK release of Baby 81.
- "The Show's About to Begin" was the B-side to the Weapon of Choice single, April 2007.
- "Vision" (CD-single only) and "20 Hours" (vinyl-single only) were B-sides to the Berlin single, July 2007.
- "MK Ultra" was released under the name "US Government" as a special digital download on the band's website in December 2005. It is an acoustic version of the song "US Government" appearing on the 2nd album Take Them On On Your Own.
