= Shape of Things to Come (Max Frost and the Troopers album) =

Studio album by Max Frost and the Troopers
- Released: 1968
- Genre: Pop rock; psychedelic rock
- Length: 22:00
- Label: Tower
- Producer: Ed Beram; Mike Curb; Harley Hatcher

Shape of Things to Come is the first and only album released by Max Frost and the Troopers. It was produced in 1968 by Mike Curb, Ed Beram, and Harley Hatcher (engineer) and directed by Rick Stephens for Sidewalk Productions and released on Tower Records.

The back cover of the album contains the following quotation:

"All things that have gone before are but the bleak, cold grayness of the early dawn... listen! Beyond the far edge of the world, the first yellow rays of sunlight are flooding toward us like the tide. Youth everywhere is ready to awake. Man stands poised to spring up from the Earth and thrust himself out, out, laughing, to stake a bright new homeland amid the stars!"

-- Angus Scrimm (Puket '83)

A brief review in Billboard highlighted several tracks and suggested that the album would be a commercial success like the single, which peaked at 22 on the Billboard Hot 100 on September 28, 1968.

Shape of Things to Come was re-released by Captain High in 2014 with bonus tracks.

== Track listing ==
Side one

1. "Shape of Things to Come" (Barry Mann and Cynthia Weil) – 1:55
2. "Lonely Man" (Paul Wibier) – 2:32
3. "Shine It On" (Wibier) – 2:29
4. "It's Wrong" (Barney Hector and Wibier) – 2:12
5. "Captain Hassel" (Dale Beckner, Hector, Stewart Martin, Gary McClain, and Wibier) – 2:21

Side two

6. "Fifty Two Per Cent" (Mann and Weil) – 2:41
7. "Try to Make Up Your Mind" (Wibier) – 1:55
8. "Let Your Mind Run Free" (Wibier) – 2:31
9. "She Lied" (Beckner and Martin) – 2:36
10. "A Change Is Gonna Come" (Beckner and Wibier) – 2:38

Bonus tracks on 2014 re-release from Captain High

11. "Love to Be Your Man" – 2:12
12. "Free Lovin'" – 2:19
13. "Psychedelic Senate" – 2:16
14. "Fourteen or Fight" – 2:48
15. "Wild in the Streets" – 2:45
16. "Listen to the Music" – 2:50
17. "Sally LeRoy" – 2:40
18. "Shelly in Camp" – 1:41
19. "Paxton Quigley's Had the Course" – 2:00

== Personnel ==
Max Frost and the Troopers

- Paul Wibier

Technical personnel

- Eddie Beram – production
- Mike Curb – production
- The Edric Agency – supervision
- Harley Hatcher – engineering, production
- Drew Struzan – cover
