= Baby 81 (album) =

Studio album by Black Rebel Motorcycle Club
- Released: April 27, 2007
- Genre: Alternative rock; garage rock; blues rock; post-punk revival; noise rock; shoegazing
- Length: 60:26
- Label: RCA, Island
- Producer: Black Rebel Motorcycle Club

Black Rebel Motorcycle Club chronology
Howl (2005)	Baby 81 (2007)	American X: Baby 81 Sessions EP (2007)

Professional ratings
Aggregate scores
Source	Rating
Metacritic	71/100
Review scores
Source	Rating
AllMusic	2.5/5 stars
NME	(7/10)
Pitchfork	(4.5/10)
Spin	8/10 stars

Baby 81 is the fourth studio album by American rock band Black Rebel Motorcycle Club. It was released on April 27, 2007, in Germany, April 30 in Europe, and on May 1 in the U.S. The album features a harder, more raw sound compared with their previous record Howl. It was also a studio comeback for drummer Nick Jago, who was unable to participate during the recordings of Howl (other than the last track recorded during the sessions, 'Promise'). A DualDisc edition of the album was set to be released on May 1 in the U.S.; however, it has since been canceled.

The album debuted at number 46 on the U.S. Billboard 200, selling about 14,000 copies in its first week.

The album title refers to Baby 81, a survivor of the 2004 Indian Ocean earthquake.

== Track listing ==
No.	Title	Length
1.	"Took Out a Loan"	4:16
2.	"Berlin"	3:11
3.	"Weapon of Choice"	2:50
4.	"Windows"	6:06
5.	"Cold Wind"	4:18
6.	"Not What You Wanted"	3:43
7.	"666 Conducer"	4:01
8.	"All You Do Is Talk"	5:42
9.	"Lien on Your Dreams"	4:36
10.	"Need Some Air"	4:04
11.	"Killing the Light"	3:55
12.	"American X"	9:11
13.	"Am I Only"	4:26

== Singles ==
- Weapon Of Choice (April 16, 2007)
  - b/w "666 Conducer" / "The Show's About To Begin" / "666 Conducer" (Acoustic)
- Berlin (July 30, 2007)
  - b/w "Vision" / "20 Hours" / "Weapon Of Choice" (Alternate Video)
- See also: American X: Baby 81 Sessions EP

== In popular culture ==
"Weapon of Choice" was featured in the bonus setlist in Guitar Hero: World Tour, Driver: San Francisco, and as downloadable content for Rock Band. It is also featured in the racing game Ferrari Challenge: Trofeo Pirelli. "Need Some Air" was featured in NASCAR 08 and Major League Baseball 2K8 . "Berlin" and "Weapon of Choice" were featured in Shaun White Snowboarding. A short film was created for the American X track and can be found on the American X EP and the Live DVD released from the Baby 81 Tour.

== Chart performance ==
Chart (2007)	Peak position
Australian Albums (ARIA)	36
Austrian Albums (Ö3 Austria)	71
Belgian Albums (Ultratop Flanders)	59
French Albums (SNEP)	98
German Albums (Offizielle Top 100)	58
Irish Albums (IRMA)	27
Italian Albums (FIMI)	99
Scottish Albums (OCC)	13
Swedish Albums (Sverigetopplistan)	53
Swiss Albums (Schweizer Hitparade)	50
UK Albums (OCC)	15
US Billboard 200	46
