= Wrong Creatures =

Studio album by Black Rebel Motorcycle Club
- Released: January 12, 2018
- Recorded: 2015–2017
- Studios: Sunset Sound (Los Angeles, CA); 606 (Los Angeles, CA); The Station House; (Los Angeles, CA)
- Genre: Alternative rock
- Length: 59:05
- Labels: Abstract Dragon; Vagrant; Cobraside; PIAS Cooperative
- Producers: Black Rebel Motorcycle Club; Nick Launay

Black Rebel Motorcycle Club chronology
Specter at the Feast (2013)	Wrong Creatures (2018)	Black Tape (2024)

Singles from Wrong Creatures
- 1. "Little Thing Gone Wild" Released: September 12, 2017; 2. "Haunt" Released: October 23, 2017; 3. "Question of Faith" Released: November 6, 2017; 4. "King of Bones" Released: November 19, 2017

Wrong Creatures is the eighth studio album by American rock band Black Rebel Motorcycle Club. The album was released through Vagrant Records on January 12, 2018.

Four songs were released as singles in late 2017 ahead of the album's release: "Little Thing Gone Wild", "Haunt", "Question of Faith", and "King of Bones". A limited edition package with a clear vinyl edition of the album, a black BRMC-branded Hohner harmonica, and a 'Black Cassette EP' was released in late April 2018. The EP contained three new unreleased songs and an extended version of the album's opener, "DFF".

== Reception ==
Professional ratings
Aggregate scores
Source	Rating
Metacritic	71/100
Review scores
Source	Rating
AllMusic	3.5/5 stars
Classic Rock	4/5 stars
Drowned in Sound	3/10 stars
The Independent	4/5 stars
NME	3/5 stars
The Observer	3/5 stars
Paste	6.4/10
Pitchfork	5.8/10
PopMatters	7/10 stars
Sputnikmusic	3.5/5 stars

Wrong Creatures received generally favorable reviews from music critics. On review aggregator website Metacritic, which uses a weighted average, the album was assigned a score of 71/100 based on 18 reviews.

== Track listing ==
Track listing and lengths confirmed by iTunes.

No.	Title	Length
1.	"DFF"	1:54
2.	"Spook"	3:45
3.	"King of Bones"	3:57
4.	"Haunt"	5:51
5.	"Echo"	5:14
6.	"Ninth Configuration"	6:53
7.	"Question of Faith"	5:20
8.	"Calling Them All Away"	6:46
9.	"Little Thing Gone Wild"	3:19
10.	"Circus Bazooko"	5:42
11.	"Carried from the Start"	4:50
12.	"All Rise"	5:40

== Charts ==
Chart (2018)	Peak position
Australian Albums (ARIA)	45
Austrian Albums (Ö3 Austria)	17
Belgian Albums (Ultratop Flanders)	31
Belgian Albums (Ultratop Wallonia)	59
German Albums (Offizielle Top 100)	22
New Zealand Heatseeker Albums (RMNZ)	5
Scottish Albums (Official Charts)	16
Swiss Albums (Schweizer Hitparade)	8
UK Albums (Official Charts)	35
US Digital Albums (Billboard)	24
US Independent Albums (Billboard)	6
US Indie Store Album Sales (Billboard)	6
US Top Album Sales (Billboard)	38
