= The Effects of 333 =

Studio album by Black Rebel Motorcycle Club
- Released: November 1, 2008
- Genre: Ambient; noise; drone; acoustic
- Length: 55:02
- Label: Abstract Dragon
- Producer: Black Rebel Motorcycle Club

Black Rebel Motorcycle Club chronology
American X: Baby 81 Sessions EP (2007)	The Effects of 333 (2008)	Beat the Devil's Tattoo (2010)

Professional ratings
Review scores
Source	Rating
Pitchfork	(0.4/10)

The Effects of 333 is the fifth studio album by Black Rebel Motorcycle Club. It was released on November 1, 2008 through the band's own Abstract Dragon imprint. The album is completely instrumental and was made available as a download through their official music store at 3:33 AM PT. It was first announced on October 27, 2008 via a MySpace bulletin, stating that the band would release their newest album independent of any record company. The cover art was drawn by Guitarist Peter Hayes.

== Track listing ==
No.	Title	Length
1.	"The Effects of 333"	3:33
2.	"Still No Answer"	5:11
3.	"I Know You're in There"	5:42
4.	"And with This Comes"	5:55
5.	"A Sad State"	5:02
6.	"A Twisted State"	4:07
7.	"Sedated with Sterilized Tongues"	6:37
8.	"We're Not Welcome Alone"	7:20
9.	"Or Needed"	4:38
10.	"And When Was Better"	7:00
