= B.R.M.C. (album) =

Studio album by Black Rebel Motorcycle Club
- Released: April 3, 2001
- Recorded: 2000
- Studio: Sound City (Van Nuys, California); Brilliant (San Francisco); BRMC (San Francisco); One Way (London)
- Genre: Alternative rock; indie rock; psychedelic rock; garage rock
- Length: 57:08
- Label: Virgin
- Producer: Black Rebel Motorcycle Club

Black Rebel Motorcycle Club chronology
B.R.M.C. (2001)	Take Them On, On Your Own (2003)

Singles from B.R.M.C.
- 1. "Love Burns" Released: January 21, 2002; 2. "Spread Your Love" Released: May 20, 2002; 3. "Whatever Happened to My Rock 'n' Roll (Punk Song)" Released: September 16, 2002

Professional ratings
Aggregate scores
Source	Rating
Metacritic	72/100
Review scores
Source	Rating
AllMusic	4/5 stars
Alternative Press	4/5
Blender	3/5 stars
The Guardian	3/5 stars
NME	8/10
Pitchfork	8.2/10
Q	4/5 stars
Rolling Stone	3/5 stars
The Rolling Stone Album Guide	4/5 stars
Under the Radar	9/10

B.R.M.C. is the debut studio album by American rock band Black Rebel Motorcycle Club, released on Virgin Records on April 3, 2001.

"Spread Your Love" was used in the 2003 Vin Diesel film A Man Apart and the TV show Skins. It has also been used in a series of commercials for Ketel One vodka as well as The Cosmopolitan hotel in Las Vegas. NME rated the song as the 27th best song of 2002.

== Track listing ==
All tracks are written by Black Rebel Motorcycle Club.

No.	Title	Length
1.	"Love Burns"	4:05
2.	"Red Eyes and Tears"	4:00
3.	"Whatever Happened to My Rock 'n' Roll (Punk Song)"	4:38
4.	"Awake"	6:12
5.	"White Palms"	4:55
6.	"As Sure as the Sun"	7:27
7.	"Rifles"	5:30
8.	"Too Real"	4:55
9.	"Spread Your Love"	3:45
10.	"Head Up High"	5:35
11.	"Salvation"	6:06

Japanese edition bonus tracks
No.	Title	Length
12.	"Screaming Gun"	3:14
13.	"At My Door"	4:45
14.	"Down Here"	3:33

European edition bonus tracks (2008 reissue)
No.	Title	Length
12.	"At My Door"	3:33
13.	"Screaming Gun"	3:14
14.	"Tonight's With You"	5:53
15.	"Loaded Gun"	6:08

Note: "As Sure as the Sun" and "Rifles" are listed with a length of 5:52 and 7:02 respectively on some releases.

== Charts ==
=== Weekly charts ===
Weekly chart performance for B.R.M.C.
Chart (2002)	Peak position
Australian Albums (ARIA)	76
French Albums (SNEP)	122
German Albums (Offizielle Top 100)	49
Irish Albums (IRMA)	28
New Zealand Albums (RMNZ)	39
Scottish Albums (OCC)	16
Swedish Albums (Sverigetopplistan)	53
UK Albums (OCC)	25

=== Year-end charts ===
Year-end chart performance for B.R.M.C.
Chart (2002)	Position
UK Albums (OCC)	118

== Certifications ==
Region	Certification	Certified units/sales
United Kingdom (BPI)	Gold	228,000
