= Black Rebel Motorcycle Club =

American rock band

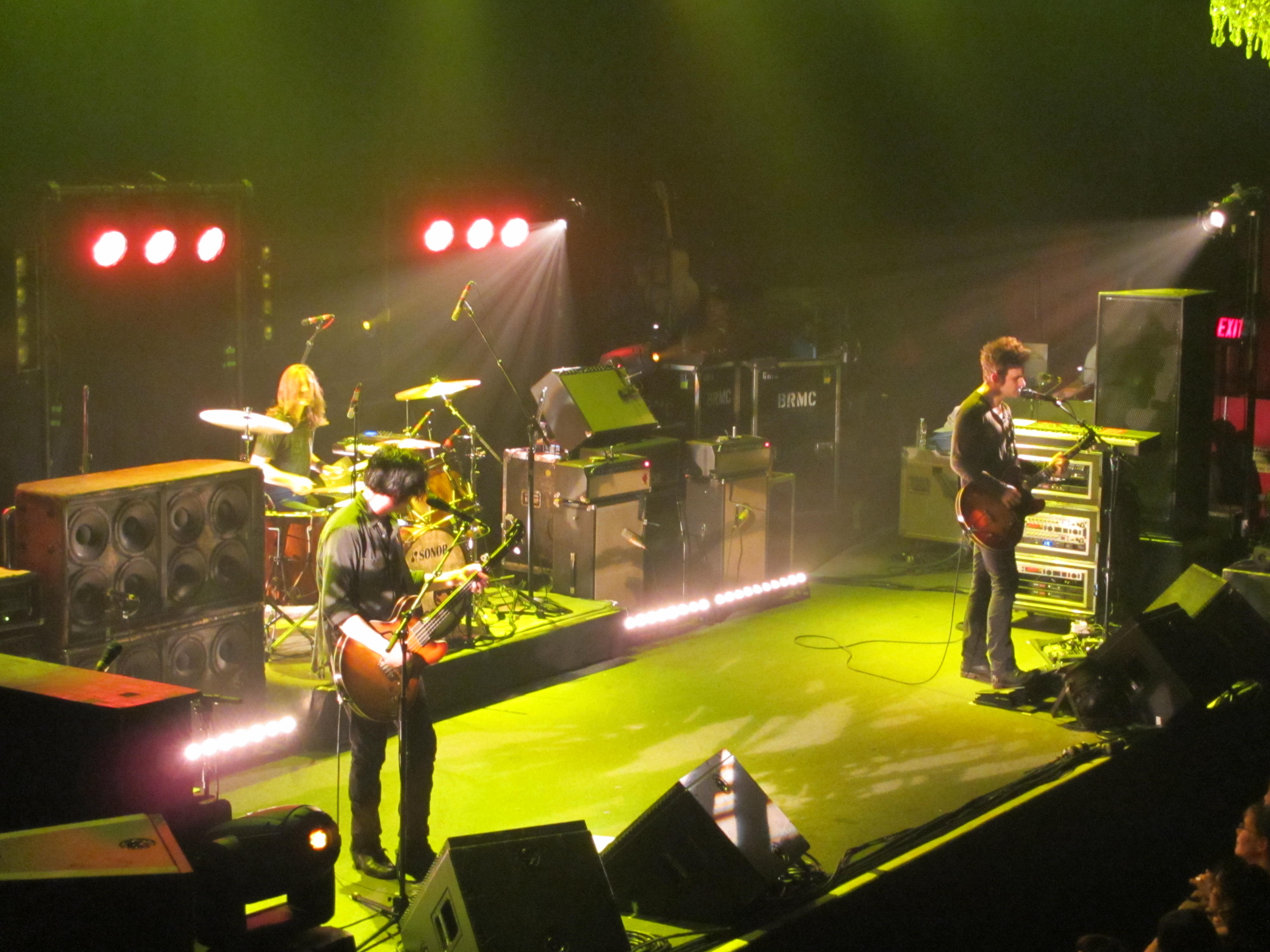
- Black Rebel Motorcycle Club performing at the Fillmore, San Francisco, in 2013

Background information
- Origin: San Francisco, California, U.S.
- Genres: Alternative rock; garage rock revival; indie rock; blues rock; psychedelic rock
- Years active: 1998–present
- Labels: Abstract Dragon; Vagrant; Cobraside; PIAS Cooperative; Virgin; RCA; Island; Echo
- Members: Peter Hayes; Robert Levon Been; Leah Shapiro
- Past members: Nick Jago
- Website: blackrebelmotorcycleclub.com

Black Rebel Motorcycle Club (sometimes abbreviated to BRMC) is an American rock band from San Francisco, California. The group was founded in 1998 by Peter Hayes (vocals, guitar, harmonica), Robert Levon Been (vocals, bass, guitar), and Nick Jago (drums). Jago departed the band in 2008 and was replaced by Leah Shapiro.

They have released eight studio albums: B.R.M.C. (2001), Take Them On, On Your Own (2003), Howl (2005), Baby 81 (2007), The Effects of 333 (2008), Beat the Devil's Tattoo (2010), Specter at the Feast (2013) and Wrong Creatures (2018), as well as several EPs, and live albums.

== History ==
=== Formation and early years (1998–1999) ===
The band was formed in 1998, originally called The Elements. After discovering that another band had the same name, the members changed the name to Black Rebel Motorcycle Club, after Marlon Brando's motorcycle club in the 1953 film The Wild One.

Bassist Robert Levon Been and guitarist Peter Hayes met at high school in the San Francisco Bay Area city of Lafayette and formed a band, Hayes having recently left The Brian Jonestown Massacre. Been has said in interviews that Hayes had a turbulent home life and would park and sleep in his car outside the Been household. After about a year of doing this, Been and his father Michael persuaded Hayes to live with them. Later, the pair started looking for a drummer. They met Nick Jago, from Devon, England, who had moved to California to be with his parents after spending some time at Winchester School of Art, where he was studying fine art. The vocals are shared between Been and Peter Hayes.

=== B.R.M.C. and Take Them On, On Your Own (2000–2003) ===
The band's first two records B.R.M.C. (2001) and Take Them On, On Your Own (2003) were indebted to classic hard rock influenced by Led Zeppelin and also encompassed slower-paced psychedelic rock, space rock, and noise pop influences from bands such as The Verve, Loop, Sonic Youth, Dinosaur Jr and The Jesus and Mary Chain. Their second album (recorded with producer Rik Simpson) has several songs such as "Generation" and "US Government" that are critical of the United States government.

Been used the pseudonym 'Robert Turner' on the first two records, in an attempt not to be linked to his father (Michael Been of The Call). He later dropped this identity when promoting Howl. The senior Been later toured with Black Rebel Motorcycle Club as part of their sound crew.

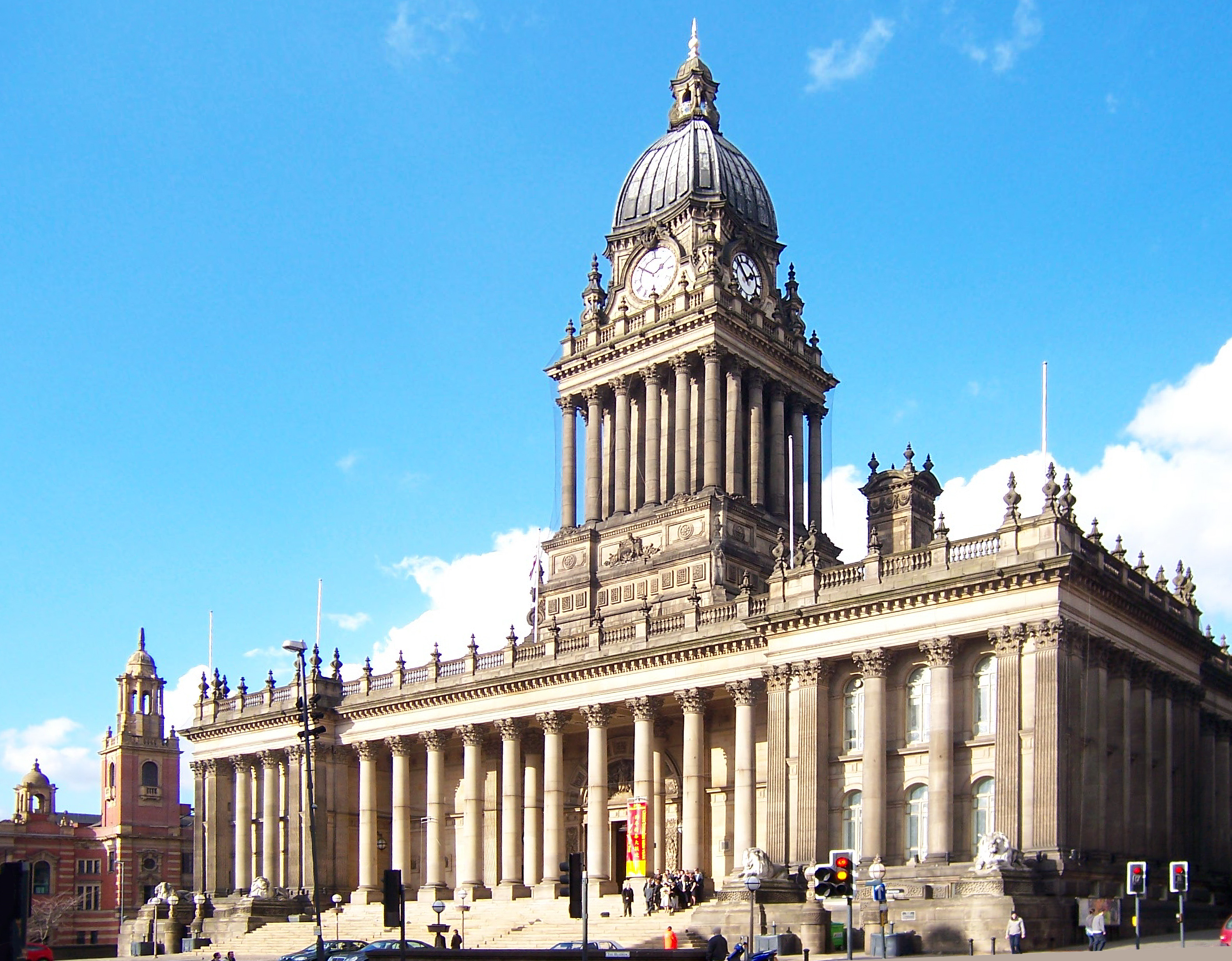
Leeds Town Hall, the venue where Black Rebel Motorcycle Club 'broke the floor'

In 2003, a concert in Leeds, West Yorkshire, England, had to be cancelled halfway through the set, after Leeds City Council officials suspected the 150-year-old floor of Leeds Town Hall might collapse. This led to the band sometimes being referred to as 'the band who broke the floor'. Problems with drummer Nick Jago began surfacing publicly at the 2003 NME Awards, when Jago remained on stage for nine minutes, completely silent, while accepting an award.

=== Howl (2004–2006) ===
After conflict with their record label, the band was dropped by Virgin Records in 2004. Jago's conflicts came to a head in Scotland, when Jago and Hayes came to blows after a tense gig. Before long, Jago quit. As such, Jago did not take part in the sessions for the band's third album, Howl. Instead, he went through various rehab attempts, eventually rejoining the band in time to record one track, the ballad "Promise".

In 2005, the band signed to Echo in the UK, and RCA in the U.S. Howl was released to mostly favorable reviews. Howl had a stripped-down folk style, a departure from the earlier B.R.M.C. sound. Several of the songs on Howl are said to have been written long before the idea of B.R.M.C. was conceived. On tour for this album the band also employed a temporary fourth member, guitarist Spike Keating.

=== Baby 81 and The Effects of 333 (2007–2009) ===
By 2007, Nick Jago had rejoined BRMC. The band's fourth album, Baby 81, was released on April 30, 2007, in the UK and Europe and May 1, 2007, in the U.S.

On June 6, 2007, BRMC performed in a concert that was streamed live on the internet via MSN Music.

In June 2008, Jago once again left BRMC's touring line-up, being replaced by The Raveonettes' touring drummer Leah Shapiro. Jago stated he "took it as I am fired again and to be honest with you I respect their decision". However, Hayes and Been issued a statement reading: "Nick won't be joining us for the upcoming European tour, but it's not true that he is fired. We just feel Nick needs time to sort out exactly what he wants right now. His heart and all his energy and attention is on his own solo project and he needs to see that through." However, in October 2015 Robert admitted that "We were ready to be an international band that never toured the States again. Thank God, we got his (Jago) visa back and we were able to play together again until we fired him, but that's a whole other story when things got even darker".

On October 27, 2008, the band announced via a MySpace bulletin that they would release their newest album independently. The album would be their first release through their own "Abstract Dragon" label. The album, titled, The Effects of 333 is instrumental and was made available as a digital download through their music store on 3:33 A.M Pacific Time on November 1, 2008.

On November 10, 2009, BRMC released a live DVD through Vagrant Records. It was recorded in Glasgow, Berlin, and Dublin during the Baby 81 world tour.

=== Beat the Devil's Tattoo (2010–2011) ===
A song by BRMC, "Done All Wrong", appeared on the soundtrack to the 2009 film The Twilight Saga: New Moon.

BRMC's sixth studio album, Beat the Devil's Tattoo was released March 8, 2010 in the UK and Europe and March 9, 2010, in North America. The band went on a world tour that lasted from February to December.

On August 19, 2010, after the band's performance at the Pukkelpop Festival in Belgium, Robert's father Michael Been died backstage of a heart attack.

On November 1, 2010, the band released their second live DVD, called Live in London, on their own website and at HMV stores in the UK. The DVD would also be for sale at the band's headlining shows throughout the tour. It was filmed in front of a sold-out London Forum on April 23, the same year. This is the last project Michael Been has worked on with the band, mixing it.

In 2011 the band started working on their 7th album, which was released in 2013. In between the recording sessions the band performed a South American tour and played their first shows in South Africa, as part of the Synergy Festival in Cape Town and China, in Beijing and Shanghai.

The band went on a brief successful three-show tour of small clubs in California to promote the album. These shows were at Slim's in San Francisco, The Catalyst in Santa Cruz, and The Troubador of Los Angeles on the December 19, 20 and 21, respectively. All three shows sold out and BRMC played to packed houses each night where the setlist ranged from classics to quite a bit of new material.

=== Specter at the Feast (2013–2016) ===
After the success of these first shows, the band announced several more shows across Europe with stops in the United Kingdom, Germany, and Italy among other countries. The last announced show was at the Austin Psych Fest on April 26, 2013.

On January 9, 2013, the band announced via Facebook the name of their seventh album called Specter at the Feast which was released on March 18 in the UK and Europe and on March 19 in U.S., Canada and worldwide.

It received mostly positive reviews; many critics noting that despite the band having been together for some time the album showed a mellower and moodier side with songs such as opener "Firewalker".

The band made the first single from the record available, a cover of The Call's 1989 hit "Let the Day Begin", as a free download on their website. The decision to record the song was a tribute to Robert's father Michael, who used his experience from The Call to help BRMC in the last couple of years before his death. The single became Q Magazine's track of the day. The same song also reached a worldwide audience when BBC's Top Gear used it for its 21st season trailer both on the live TV show and online. The band have also released the Let the Day Begin EP free, the EP consists of the single and the album track "Returning", made available for streaming on the official website.

The band continued to show a willingness to tour despite obstacles. During the 2013 tour, the organisers of the Harvest festival in Australia decided to abandon the multi-city event, of which BRMC were one of the lead acts, only a few months ahead of the performances. BRMC was the first band to announce it would still visit the country and play its own shows. Several sold out.

On October 2, 2014, the band announced they were in the studio mixing the audio for a forthcoming live album and DVD recorded in Paris during the Specter at the Feast tour.

=== Wrong Creatures (2017–present) ===
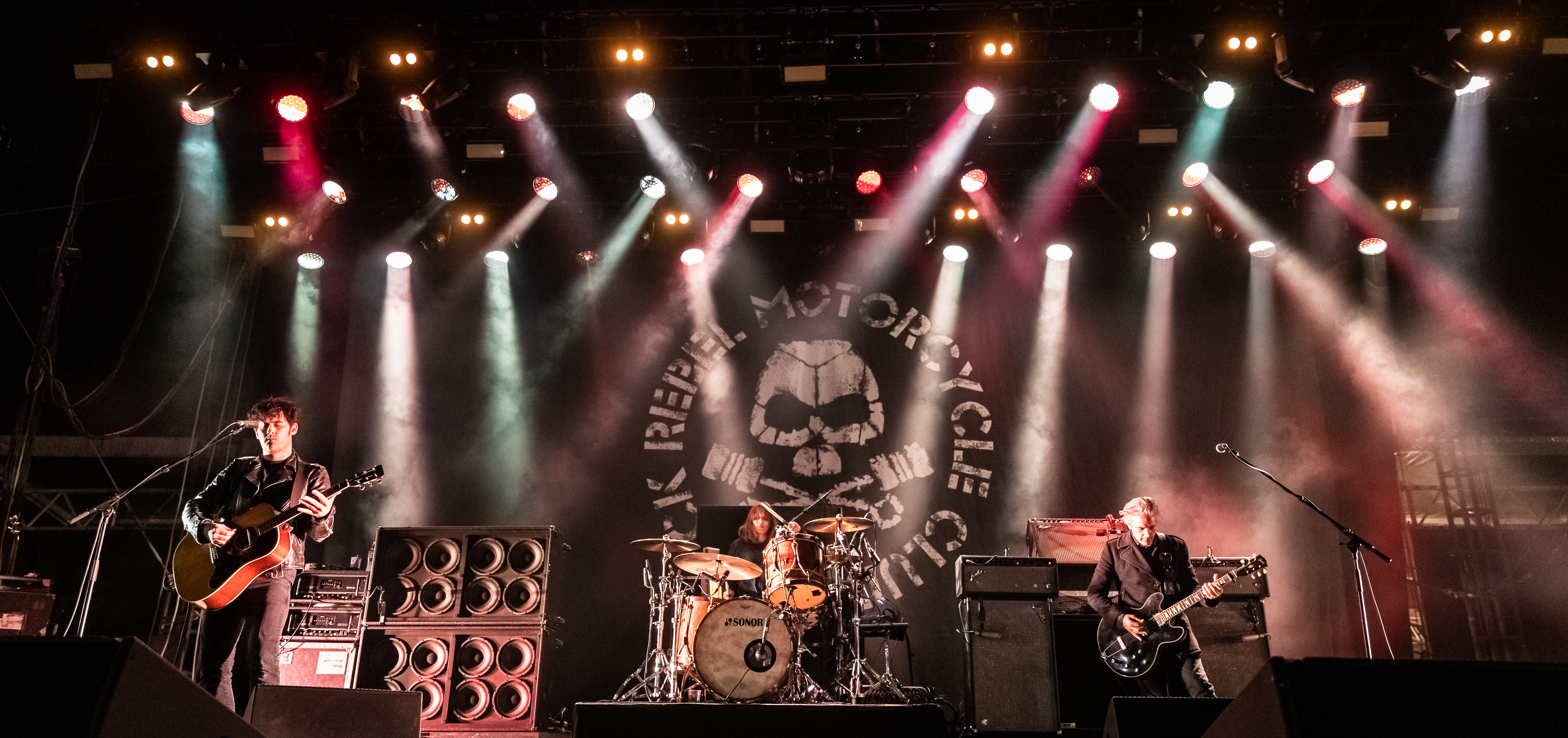
Black Rebel Motorcycle Club live at Rock am Ring 2019

In May 2017, the band confirmed they were working on a new studio album to be released in the fall of 2017. On September 12, 2017, they announced the album, Wrong Creatures, would be released on January 12, 2018. The announcement was accompanied by the release of the first track, "Little Thing Gone Wild".

In 2024, BRMC recorded a cover version of the traditional American folk song God’s Gonna Cut You Down, which was used in episode 2 of the Netflix miniseries A Man In Full. In July 2025, the band issued a "cease and desist" request, via a post on their Instagram page, to the Trump administration's Department of Homeland Security (DHS) alleging unauthorized use of their recording of the song in a recruitment video.

== Band members ==
Current members

- Peter Hayes – vocals, guitars, bass, harmonica, synthesizers (1998–present)
- Robert Levon Been – vocals, bass, guitars, piano (1998–present)
- Leah Shapiro – drums, percussion, backing vocals (2008–present)

Former members

- Nick Jago – drums, percussion (1998–2004, 2005–2008)

Timeline

== Discography ==
Studio albums

- B.R.M.C. (2001)
- Take Them On, On Your Own (2003)
- Howl (2005)
- Baby 81 (2007)
- The Effects of 333 (2008)
- Beat the Devil's Tattoo (2010)
- Specter at the Feast (2013)
- Wrong Creatures (2018)
