= Michael Been =

- 1994 publicity photo

Background information
- Born: Michael Kenneth Been; March 17, 1950; Oklahoma City, Oklahoma, U.S.
- Died: August 19, 2010 (aged 60) Hasselt, Belgium
- Label: Qwest/Reprise

Michael Kenneth Been (March 17, 1950 – August 19, 2010) was an American rock musician who achieved critical attention and rotation play on MTV in the 1980s with his band The Call. He later released an album of his solo work and toured with his son's band Black Rebel Motorcycle Club. His song "Let the Day Begin" was the official campaign song of Al Gore's 2000 U.S. presidential campaign. His song "Oklahoma" was one of the top ten choices for Oklahoma's official state rock song and a line from the song provided the name for Another Hot Oklahoma Night: A Rock & Roll Exhibit at the Oklahoma History Center.

== Background ==
Born in Oklahoma City, Oklahoma, Been later lived in Park Forest, south of Chicago, where he attended high school and formed his first band, the Chessman. This was followed by a popular Park Forest band called "The Saints". It featured Lead Singer Mark Gallagher. Later he joined with Michael Dixon, John Daniels and Dave Nelson in "The Troys" which were signed by Dunhill Records, owned by Bill Traut. The Troys were a popular recurring act at the Cellar in Arlington Heights IL owned by their manager Paul Sampson. Later, he moved to Chicago, where he was briefly a member of the band Aorta at the time of their second album Aorta 2, in 1970. He then joined Lovecraft, the successor band to the psychedelic rock group H.P. Lovecraft.

Moving to Santa Cruz in the mid-1970s, Been played with former Moby Grape members Jerry Miller and Bob Mosley in the band Fine Wine, and then again with Miller in the band The Original Haze which also featured Scott Musick on drums. Been also played bass on the first two albums by 2nd Chapter of Acts, their 1974 album With Footnotes and their 1975 album In the Volume of the Book, as well as Barry McGuire's 1974 release, Lighten Up.

After their experiences in the Original Haze, Been and Musick teamed up with Dale Ockerman to form the Michael Been Band Is Airtight, which was quickly shortened to "Airtight". Following Ockerman's departure, Been and Musick remained together and formed Moving Pictures, which soon became the Call.

The Call emerged in 1980 in Santa Cruz with Been on lead vocals and guitar, Musick on drums, Tom Ferrier on guitar, and bassist Greg Freeman. They were first discovered by Tulsa's Phil Seymour. By the dawning of the 1980s, the band had become the Call, and they released a self-titled album in 1982 with Mercury Records. The band's 1983 album Modern Romans led to a world tour opening for Peter Gabriel and featured the song "The Walls Came Down" which achieved heavy rotation on MTV.

Been participated in composing and performing the music to Paul Schrader's 1992 film Light Sleeper. The film also features two of his songs, "To Feel This Way" and "World on Fire". In 1994, he recorded a solo album, On the Verge of a Nervous Breakthrough.

Been appeared as a sideman in bands fronted by actor Harry Dean Stanton; Stanton having played harmonica on the Let the Day Begin track, "For Love". He played the apostle John in Martin Scorsese's 1988 feature film The Last Temptation of Christ and had some film credits.

Been recorded an album of solo material in the 1990s that remains unreleased.

Been's son, Robert Levon Been, is the frontman for Black Rebel Motorcycle Club. Michael Been was heavily involved in BRMC as their sound engineer and toured with them.

Been died at the age of 60 on August 19, 2010, in Hasselt, Belgium, of a heart attack while at the Pukkelpop 2010 music festival where he was on-tour as a sound man for Black Rebel Motorcycle Club.

== Discography (solo) ==
- Light Sleeper (1992)
- On the Verge of a Nervous Breakthrough (1994, Qwest/Reprise)

== Filmography ==
Year	Title	Role
1988	The Last Temptation of Christ	John the Apostle
