= Robert Levon Been =

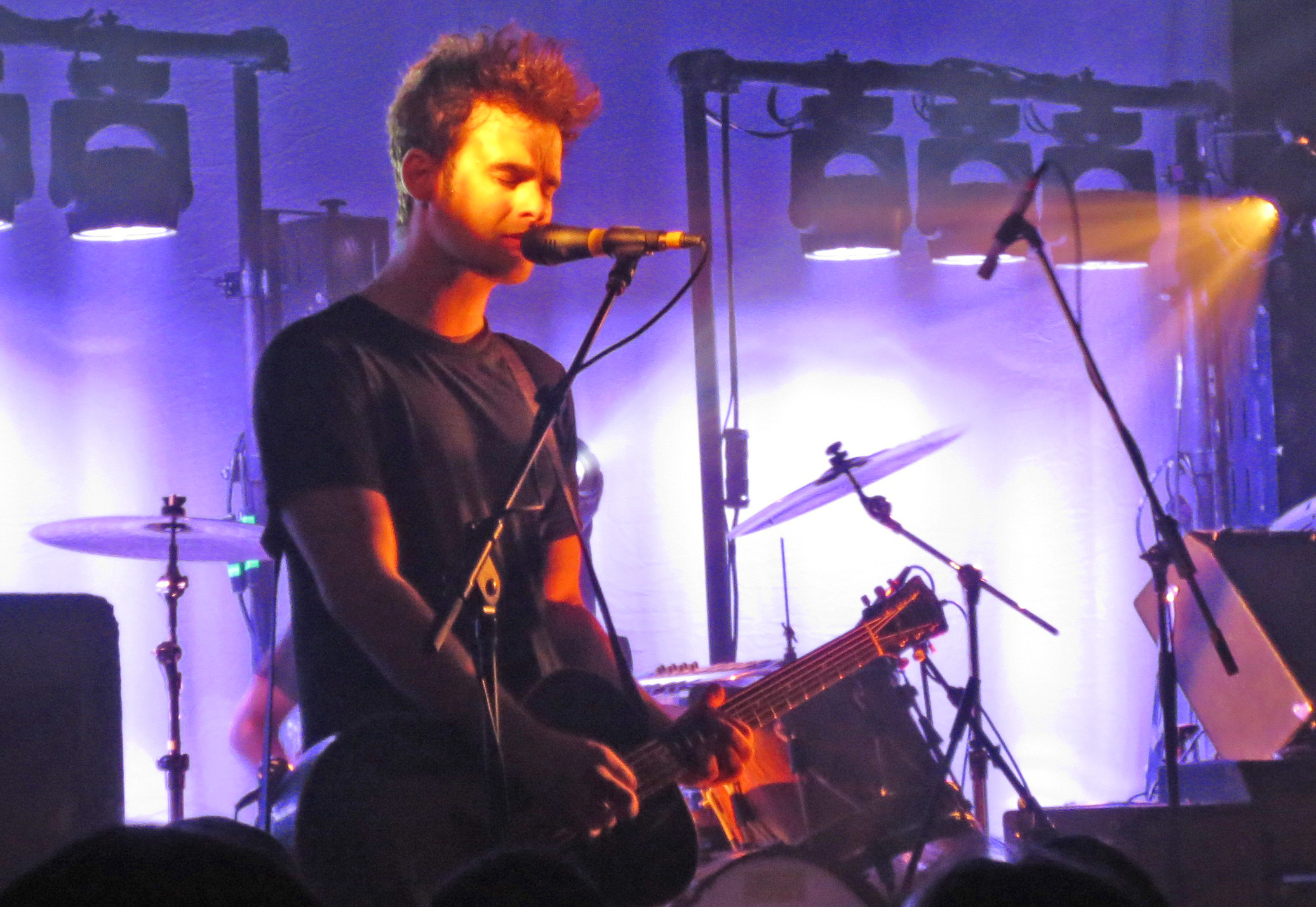
- Robert Levon Been, 2013

Background information
- Also known as: Robert Locke, Robert Turner
- Born: August 22, 1977 (age 49); Felton, California, U.S.
- Genres: Alternative rock; garage rock; neo-psychedelia; blues rock; noise rock; shoegazing
- Occupations: Musician, singer
- Instruments: Vocals; bass guitar; guitar; organ; piano
- Years active: 1995–present
- Labels: Virgin, RCA, Abstract Dragon

Robert Levon Been (born August 22, 1977), previously known by the stage name Robert Turner, is an American musician and singer. He is currently a member of the rock band Black Rebel Motorcycle Club and was, for a time, a bass player in a band known as The Beggars, going under the name "Robert Locke". He is the son of Michael Been of The Call, and appeared as bassist on his father's 1994 solo album On the Verge of a Nervous Breakthrough.

His father suffered a fatal heart attack in 2010 while working as a sound engineer during the Pukkelpop festival in Belgium, where BRMC were appearing. Robert Been used the pseudonym 'Robert Turner' on Black Rebel Motorcycle Club's first two records, in an attempt not to be linked to his father. He later dropped this identity when promoting their third album, Howl. In 2013, BRMC covered his father's song "Let The Day Begin" on their album Specter at the Feast. Later that year, he appeared in two concerts with a reunited The Call, taking his father's place on bass and vocals.

== Musical equipment ==
Been is also known for his heavily distorted bass sound provided by his hollow-bodied Epiphone Rivoli basses. On how he acquired his first one, Been says "I got my first one because it was all I could afford. I couldn’t afford to go to Guitar Center! I found this pawn shop in San Francisco, and it was the only bass on the wall apart from modern plastic things. It was $800, and had loads of scars all over it. I complained to the guy that it was scratched and a bit messed up. He didn’t know basses at all, and I was 'complaining' about the things I really loved about it! I knocked him down to 400 bucks."

He has exclusively used variants of the Ampeg SVT amplifier for both guitar and bass live and in the studio. He also plays guitar on a number of songs, most popularly "Berlin" and "Beat the Devil's Tattoo", and piano on several tracks, most notably "Promise".

== Playing style ==
Been prefers to play with a pick and makes use of chords and open strings while strumming. His "booming," overdriven tone is a central part of Black Rebel Motorcycle Club's sound. He achieves this sound through layering multiple distortion boxes and with a very aggressive playing style. He plays melodically and has cited Peter Hook as the foremost influence on his playing, noting that "His parts seemed 'fightable'. And certain things from Ride and Verve records. I tend to be more aggressive than those though, that's my American side. Hendrix records, Nirvana… they all have bass that really inspires me."

== Discography ==
- Original Songs From The Card Counter (2021)
