= Kathy McCord discography =

- Studio albums: 2
- Compilation albums: 1
- Singles: 3
- Guest appearances: 3

The discography of Kathy McCord consists of two studio albums, one compilation album and three singles on CTI Records, Manhattan Records, Rainy Day Records and Big Beat Records.

== Albums ==
=== Studio albums ===
Title	Album details
Kathy McCord	Released: 1970; Recorded: 1969; Label: CTI Records; Format: LP
Baby Come Out Tonight	Released: 1979; Recorded: 1972–1978; Label: Manhattan Records; Format: LP

=== Compilation albums ===
Title	Album details
New Jersey to Woodstock	Released: 2010; Recorded: 1968–1969, 1972–1979; Label: Big Beat Records; Formats: 2xCD, DL

=== Reissues of the 'Kathy McCord' album ===
Title	Year	Country	Label	Format	Notes
Rainbow Ride	1999	Japan	Vivid Sound	CD	Both CD reissues were released without the artist's approval
Kathy McCord	2011	South Korea	Media Arte	CD	Both CD reissues were released without the artist's approval

== Singles ==
Title	Year	Album	Label	Country
"I'll Give My Heart To You" / "I'll Never Be Alone Again"	1968	non-album single^{a}	Rainy Day Records	USA
"Take Away This Pain" / "I'm Leaving Home"	1970	Kathy McCord	CTI Records	USA
"New York Good Sugar/Love Lyric #7" / "I'm Leaving Home"	1971	Kathy McCord	CTI Records	Spain

^a Was released on New Jersey to Woodstock compilation in 2010.

== Guest appearances ==
Title	Year	Performer	Role
Freewheelin'	1973	Fabulous Rhinestones	Backing vocals
"Back Door Man" (single)	1975	Billy Vera	Backing vocals
Promise Me the Moon	1977	David Sanborn Band	Vocals
Small Town Days and Nights	1980	Guy and Pipp Gillette	Backing vocals

== As part of Crazy Joe & The Variable Speed Band ==
=== Albums ===
Title	Album details
Eugene	Released: 1981; Label: Casablanca Records; Formats: LP, CD, DL

=== Singles ===
Title	Year	Charts	Album
Title	Year	US Pop	Album
"Eugene"	1980	105	Eugene
"Ice Cream"	1981	—	Eugene
"Eugene Goes To School"	1982	—	non-album single
"Wild Thing"^{b}	1984	—	non-album single

^b Promo single.

=== Music videos ===
Title	Year
"Eugene"	1980

== Production credits ==
Title(s)	Year	Performer	Album	Role
"Freewheelin'" "Roots with You, Girl"	1973	The Fabulous Rhinestones	Freewheelin'	Co-writer
"Baby, Come Out Tonight"	1977	Dolly Parton	Here You Come Again	Writer
