= Bolivia (disambiguation) =

Bolivia is a country in South America.

Bolivia may also refer to:

== Places ==
- Bolivia, New South Wales, a village in Australia
- Bolivia, Cuba in the province of Ciego de Ávila
- Bolivia, Illinois, U.S.
- Bolivia, North Carolina, U.S.
- Bolivia Island, a former name of Santa Cruz in the Galápagos Archipelago, Ecuador

== Other uses ==
- Bolivia (film), directed by Israel Adrián Caetano in 2001
- Bolívia (footballer) (born 1986), Anderson Rodrigues Cardoso, Brazilian footballer
- "Bolivia" (Walton song), a jazz standard by Cedar Walton
- Bolivia (Gato Barbieri album), a 1973 jazz album by Gato Barbieri
- Bolivia (Freddie Hubbard album), a 1991 jazz album by Freddie Hubbard
- "Bolivia", a single by Francesca Michielin on her album 2640
- A character from the television series Fringe
- A card game that is a variant of canasta
