= Street Singer (album) =

Studio album by Tina Brooks and Jackie McLean
- Released: June 6, 1980
- Recorded: September 1, 1960
- Studio: Van Gelder Studio, Englewood Cliffs, NJ
- Genre: Jazz
- Length: 41:48
- Label: Blue Note; GXF 3067
- Producer: Alfred Lion

Tina Brooks and Jackie McLean chronology
True Blue (1960)	Street Singer (1980)	Back to the Tracks (1960)

Alternate cover

Street Singer is a hard bop album jointly led by tenor Tina Brooks and alto Jackie McLean. The tracks "Appointment in Ghana", "A Ballad for Doll" and "Isle of Java" were originally released in 1961 on McLean's album Jackie's Bag. The full session, including three previously unreleased tracks, was first released on the Japanese Blue Note label in 1980.

== Track listing ==
1. "Melonae's Dance" (McLean) - 6:50
2. "Appointment in Ghana" (McLean) - 6:59
3. "Medina" (Brooks) - 6:48
4. "Isle of Java" (Brooks) - 7:31
5. "Street Singer" (Brooks) - 10:19
6. "A Ballad for Doll" (McLean) - 3:19

== Personnel ==
- Tina Brooks - tenor saxophone
- Jackie McLean - alto saxophone
- Blue Mitchell - trumpet
- Kenny Drew - piano
- Paul Chambers - bass
- Art Taylor - drums

== See also ==
- Jackie's Bag – the same recording date
