= Back to Birdland =

Studio album by Freddie Hubbard
- Released: 1983
- Recorded: 19 and 20 January 1981
- Studio: Soundmasters, Hollywood, California
- Genre: Jazz
- Length: 35:10
- Label: Real Time Records
- Producer: Ralph Jungheim

Freddie Hubbard chronology
Above & Beyond (1982)	Back to Birdland (1983)	Sweet Return (1983)

Professional ratings
Review scores
Source	Rating
AllMusic	4/5 stars
The Rolling Stone Jazz Record Guide	4/5 stars

Back to Birdland is an album by jazz musician Freddie Hubbard, recorded in August 1982. and released on the Real Time label. The AllMusic review by Scott Yanow, calls the album "Hubbard's first worthwhile studio recording (with the exception of Super Blue), since the mid-'70s".

== Track listing ==
All compositions by Freddie Hubbard except as indicated

1. "Shaw 'Nuff" (Ray Brown, Gil Fuller, Dizzy Gillespie) – 5:19
2. "Star Eyes" (Gene de Paul, Don Raye) – 6:05
3. "Lover Man" (Jimmy Davis, Ram Ramirez, James Sherman) – 5:39
4. "For B.P." – 6:58
5. "Stella by Starlight" (Ned Washington, Victor Young) – 5:18
6. "Byrdlike" – 5:42

== Personnel ==
- Freddie Hubbard: trumpet
- George Cables: piano
- Richie Cole: alto saxophone
- Ashley Alexander: trombone
- Med Flory: alto saxophone (track 6)
- Andy Simpkins: bass
- John Dentz: drums
