= Live at the North Sea Jazz Festival, 1980 =

Live at the North Sea Jazz Festival, 1980 may refer to:

- Live at the North Sea Jazz Festival, 1980 (Oscar Peterson album)
- Live at the North Sea Jazz Festival, 1980 (Freddie Hubbard album)
