= Ralph Penland =

American jazz drummer (1953–2014)

Ralph Morris Penland (born February 15, 1953, Cincinnati, died March 13, 2014) was an American jazz drummer.

Penland was a percussionist with the Cincinnati Symphony Orchestra as a high schooler. He attended the New England Conservatory of Music and played in Boston with Gil Scott-Heron and Webster Lewis; he also played in New York in the early 1970s where he played with Freddie Hubbard among others. In 1975 he moved to Los Angeles and led his own group, Penland Polygon; he also worked as a session musician for Chet Baker, Kenny Burrell, Eddie Harris, Harold Land, Charles Lloyd, Ronnie Matthews, and Nancy Wilson. In the 1980s he worked with George Cables, Dianne Reeves, Buddy Montgomery, Charlie Rouse, Jimmie Rowles, Rick Zunigar, Andy Simpkins, Dave Mackay, Bunky Green, Richard Todd, and John Nagourney. In the 1990s he toured with Frank Sinatra, Herbie Hancock, and Carlos Santana, and was active as a studio drummer, recording with Bob Cooper, Eddie Daniels, James Leary, Marc Copland, Dieter Ilg, Lou Levy, Carmen Bradford, Janis Siegel, Fred Hersch, Rickey Woodard, Carmen Lundy, Joe Sample, and Miki Coltrane. Penland died of a heart attack in 2014.

== Discography ==
With George Cables

- Sleeping Bee (Atlas, 1983)
- Wonderful L.A. (Atlas, 1983)
- By George (Contemporary, 1987)

With Freddie Hubbard

- Keep Your Soul Together (CTI, 1973)
- High Energy (Columbia, 1974)
- Blues for Miles (Evidence, 1992)
- All Blues (Jazz World, 1995)
- At Jazz Jamboree Warszawa '91: A Tribute to Miles (Starburst, 2000)

With James Leary

- James (Vital, 1991)
- James II (Vital, 1992)
- The Heart of the Matter (Vital, 1992)

With others

- Chet Baker, Chet Baker Sings and Plays from the Film "Let's Get Lost" (Novus/RCA, 1989)
- Bob Belden, Puccini's Turandot (Blue Note, 1993)
- Maria Bethania, As Cancoes Que Voce Fez Pra Mim (Universal/Mercury 2006)
- Carmen Bradford, With Respect (Evidence, 1995)
- Jeanie Bryson, Live at Warsaw Jazz Festival 1991 (Jazzmen/Bellaphon, 1993)
- Conte Candoli, Sweet Simon (Best 1991)
- Natalie Cole, Stardust (Elektra, 1996)
- Ravi Coltrane, Tenor Titans (Alfa, 1993)
- Bob Cooper, For All We Know (Fresh Sound, 1991)
- Marc Copland, Dieter Ilg, Tracks (Bellaphon, 1992)
- Marc Copland, Dieter Ilg, Two Way Street (Jazzline, 1993)
- Eddie Daniels, This Is Now (GRP, 1991)
- Jerry Goldsmith, The Russia House (MCA, 1990)
- Bunky Green, Healing the Pain (Delos, 1990)
- Eddie Harris, That Is Why You're Overweight (Atlantic, 1976)
- Etta James, Mystery Lady (Private Music, 1994)
- Etta James, Blue Gardenia (Private Music, 2001)
- k.d. lang, Recollection (Nonesuch, 2010)
- Hubert Laws, My Time Will Come (MusicMasters, 1993)
- Lou Levy, Lunarcy (Gitanes/EmArcy/Polygram, 1992)
- Eric Lewis, Hopscotch (Fortress/Bungalo 2006)
- Carmen Lundy, Self Portrait (JVC, 1995)
- Dave Mackay, Windows (MAMA 1990)
- Mark Masters, Jimmy Knepper Songbook (Focus 1993)
- Kathi McDonald, Above & Beyond (Merrimack, 1999)
- Carlos McKinney, Up Front (Sirocco, 1997)
- Buddy Montgomery, So Why Not? (Landmark, 1989)
- Patrick O'Hearn, White Sands (Polydor, 1992)
- Phil Ranelin, Love Dreams (Rebirth, 1986)
- Phil Ranelin, A Close Encounter of the Very Best Kind (Lifeforce, 1996)
- Dianne Reeves, Dianne Reeves (Blue Note, 1987)
- Jimmy Rowles, Plus2, Plus3, Plus4 (JVC, 1995)
- Charlie Rouse, Epistrophy (Landmark, 1989)
- Joe Sample, Old Places Old Faces (Warner Bros., 1996)
- Gil Scott-Heron, Secrets (Arista, 1978)
- Frank Strazzeri, Kat Dancin (Discovery, 1987)
- Jack Sheldon, Sunday Afternoons at the Lighthouse (Woofy, 2005)
- Janis Siegel & Fred Hersch, Slow Hot Wind (Varèse Sarabande, 1995)
- Richard Todd, Rickter Scale (GM, 1990)
- Richard Todd, With a Twist (RCM, 2002)
- Cedar Walton, Charmed Circle (HighNote, 2017)
- Nancy Wilson, Life, Love and Harmony (Capitol, 1979)
- Nancy Wilson, Take My Love (Capitol, 1980)
- Rickey Woodard, Yazoo (Concord Jazz, 1994)
- Rickey Woodard, The Silver Strut (Concord Jazz, 1996)
