= Penland =

Penland may refer to:

- Penland (surname)
- Penland, North Carolina, U.S.
  - Penland School of Craft
