= Times Are Changing =

Studio album by Freddie Hubbard
- Released: 1989
- Genre: Jazz
- Label: Blue Note
- Producer: Todd Cochran

Freddie Hubbard chronology
Minor Mishap (1989)	Times Are Changing (1989)	Topsy - Standard Book (1989)

Professional ratings
Review scores
Source	Rating
Allmusic	3/5 stars

Times Are Changing is an album by trumpeter Freddie Hubbard released on the Blue Note Records label. It features performances by Hubbard, drummer Michael Shrieve, percussionist Munyungo Jackson, keyboardist Bayete, with guest appearances by bassist Stanley Clarke, drummer Stix Hooper and singer Phil Perry.

== Track listing ==
1. "Spanish Rose" (Todd Cochran) - 6:27
2. "Back to Lovin' Again" (Todd Cochran) 4:30
3. "Was She Really There?" (G.F. M'lely) - 5:55
4. "Corazon Amplio (A Song for Bert)" (Todd Cochran) - 5:09
5. "Times 'R Changin'" (Todd Cochran) - 5:29
6. "Sabrosa" (Tex Allen) - 8:40
7. "Fragile" (Sting) - 6:27

== Personnel ==
- Freddie Hubbard - trumpet, flugelhorn
- Michael Shrieve - cymbals, drum programming
- Munyungo Jackson - percussion
- Todd Cochran - keyboards, drum programming
- Stanley Clarke - electric bass (track 1)
- Stix Hooper - drums (tracks 1 & 5)
- Phil Perry - vocals (track 3)

== Charts ==
Chart performance for Times Are Changing
Chart (1989)	Peak position
US Top Contemporary Jazz Albums (Billboard)	19
