= Topsy – Standard Book =

Topsy - Standard Book

Studio album by Freddie Hubbard
- Released: 1990
- Recorded: December 10–11, 1989
- Genre: Jazz
- Label: Alfa

Freddie Hubbard chronology
Times are Changing (1989)	Topsy - Standard Book (1990)	Bolivia (1991)

Professional ratings
Review scores
Source	Rating
AllMusic	2.5/5 stars
The Penguin Guide to Jazz Recordings	3/4 stars

Topsy – Standard Book is an album by trumpeter Freddie Hubbard recorded in December 1989 and released on the Japanese Alfa Jazz label. It features performances by Hubbard, Benny Green, Carl Allen, Rufus Reid and Kenny Garrett.

== Reception ==
The AllMusic review by Scott Yanow states "the music is often more mellow than one might hope, even when uptempo. It's a pleasing but not essential release."

== Track listing ==
1. "Topsy" (Edgar Battle, Eddie Durham) - 5:17
2. "Caravan" (Duke Ellington, Irving Mills, Juan Tizol) - 10:47
3. "As Time Goes By" (Herman Hupfeld) - 6:06
4. "Cherokee" (Ray Noble) - 5:42
5. "Manhã de Carnaval = Black Orpheus" (Luiz Bonfá) - 6:25
6. "Love Me or Leave Me" (Walter Donaldson, Gus Kahn) - 7:51
7. "All of You" (Cole Porter) - 6:08
8. "Golden Earrings" (Victor Young) - 6:45
9. "Lament (J. J. Johnson) - 7:53

== Personnel ==
- Freddie Hubbard - trumpet
- Kenny Garrett - alto saxophone on 2, 4 & 6 only
- Benny Green - piano
- Rufus Reid - bass
- Carl Allen - drums
