= MMTC: Monk, Miles, Trane & Cannon =

Studio album by Freddie Hubbard
- Released: 1995
- Recorded: August 19–20, 1994 and January 1995
- Studio: Power Station, New York City, NY
- Genre: Jazz
- Length: 54:59
- Label: MusicMasters
- Producer: Big Apple Productions, Inc.

Freddie Hubbard chronology
Blues for Miles (1992)	MMTC: Monk, Miles, Trane & Cannon (1995)	New Colors (2001)

Professional ratings
Review scores
Source	Rating
Allmusic	1.5/5 stars

MMTC: Monk, Miles, Trane & Cannon is an album by trumpeter Freddie Hubbard recorded in August 1994 and January 1995 and released on the MusicMasters label. It features performances by Hubbard, Javon Jackson, Vincent Herring, Gary Smulyan, Stephen Scott, Peter Washington and Carl Allen. The album combines Hubbard's tributes to jazz legends with compositions by John Coltrane, Charles Lloyd, Thelonious Monk and Miles Davis as well as Cannonball Adderley.

This was Hubbard's first studio recording since injuring his top lip in 1992, which resulted in permanent embouchure damage and subsequent performance difficulties for the rest of his life

== Track listing ==
All compositions by Freddie Hubbard except as indicated.

1. "One of a Kind" – 7:09
2. "Naima" (John Coltrane) – 7:12
3. "Spirit of Trane" – 6:20
4. "The Song My Lady Sings" (Charles Lloyd) – 7:59
5. "Off Minor" (Thelonious Monk) – 5:38
6. "All Blues" (Miles Davis) – 7:38
7. "D Minor Mint" – 6:35
8. "One for Cannon" – 6:28

== Personnel ==
- Freddie Hubbard – trumpet
- Carl Allen – drums
- Vincent Herring – alto saxophone
- Javon Jackson – tenor saxophone
- Stephen Scott – piano
- Gary Smulyan – baritone saxophone
- Peter Washington – double bass
- Robin Eubanks – trombone
