= Hub-Tones =

Studio album by Freddie Hubbard
- Released: November 1963
- Recorded: October 10, 1962
- Studios: Van Gelder, Englewood Cliffs, New Jersey, United States
- Genre: Jazz
- Length: 38:51
- Labels: Blue Note; BST 84115
- Producer: Alfred Lion

Freddie Hubbard chronology
The Artistry of Freddie Hubbard (1962)	Hub-Tones (1963)	Here to Stay (1962)

Professional ratings
Review scores
Source	Rating
AllMusic	4.5/5 stars
The Encyclopedia of Popular Music	5/5 stars
The Penguin Guide to Jazz Recordings	4/4 stars
The Rolling Stone Jazz Record Guide	5/5 stars
The Virgin Encyclopedia of Jazz	4/5 stars

Hub-Tones is an album by trumpeter Freddie Hubbard, recorded on October 10, 1962, and released on the Blue Note label as BLP 4115 and BST 84115. It contains performances by Hubbard, James Spaulding, Herbie Hancock, Reggie Workman and Clifford Jarvis. The cover artwork was designed by Reid Miles with photography by Francis Wolff.

== Track listing ==
All compositions by Freddie Hubbard except as indicated

1. "You're My Everything" (Mort Dixon, Harry Warren, and Joe Young) – 6:33
2. "Prophet Jennings" – 5:31
3. "Hub-Tones" – 8:24
4. "Lament for Booker" – 9:39
5. "For Spee's Sake" – 8:35

Compact Disc bonus tracks

6. "You're My Everything" (Alternate Take) – 6:30
7. "Hub-Tones" (Alternate Take) – 8:00
8. "For Spee's Sake" (Alternate Take) – 7:54

== Personnel ==
- Freddie Hubbard – trumpet
- James Spaulding – alto saxophone, flute
- Herbie Hancock – piano
- Reggie Workman – bass
- Clifford Jarvis – drums

== See also ==
The concept of the album's cover art was used several times by Blue Note, and has been paid homage by other artists since then, including:

- Speakin' My Piece, a 1960 Horace Parlan album, also on Blue Note
- Shoutin', a 1963 Don Wilkerson album, also on Blue Note
- Shadows in the Night, a 2015 Bob Dylan album

== Charts ==
Weekly chart performance for Hub-Tones
Chart (2019)	Peak position
UK Jazz & Blues Albums (Official Charts)	12
