= Live at Fat Tuesday's =

Live album by Freddie Hubbard
- Released: 1992
- Recorded: December 6–7, 1991
- Genre: Jazz
- Label: MusicMasters

Freddie Hubbard chronology
At Jazz Jamboree Warszawa '91: A Tribute to Miles (2000)	Live at Fat Tuesday's (1992)	Blues for Miles (1992)

Professional ratings
Review scores
Source	Rating
Allmusic	1.5/5 stars

Live at Fat Tuesday's is a live album by trumpeter Freddie Hubbard recorded in December 1991 and released on the MusicMasters label. It features performances by Hubbard, Javon Jackson, Benny Green, Christian McBride and Tony Reedus.

== Reception ==
The Allmusic review by Scott Yanow states "Freddie Hubbard's once beautiful tone was definitely on the decline by this point, which is particularly noticeable on high notes (which often sound painful) and the lone ballad...Better to pick up Freddie Hubbard's earlier sessions instead"

== Track listing ==
All compositions by Freddie Hubbard except as indicated

DISC 1

1. "Take It to the Ozone" - 9:40
2. "Egad" (McBride) - 13:01
3. "Phoebe's Samba" (Green) - 6:56
4. "But Beautiful" (Johnny Burke, Jimmy Van Heusen) - 9:20
5. "One of a Kind" - 7:58

DISC 2

1. "Core" - 13:58
2. "Destiny's Children" - 19:30
3. "First Light" - 19:45

== Personnel ==
- Freddie Hubbard - trumpet
- Javon Jackson - tenor saxophone
- Benny Green - piano
- Christian McBride - bass
- Tony Reedus - drums
