= The Rose Tattoo (album) =

Studio album by Freddie Hubbard
- Released: 1984
- Recorded: December 9–10, 1983
- Studio: Van Gelder Studio
- Genre: Jazz
- Label: Baystate
- Producer: Fumimaru Kawashima, Makoto Kimata

Freddie Hubbard chronology
Sweet Return (1983)	The Rose Tattoo (1984)	Double Take (1985)

Professional ratings
Review scores
Source	Rating
Allmusic	3.5/5 stars

The Rose Tattoo is an album by jazz musician Freddie Hubbard recorded in December 1983 and released on the Japanese Baystate label.

== Reception ==
The Allmusic review by Jason Ankeny calls the album "one of Freddie Hubbard's most obscure sessions, but admirers of the trumpeter's early-'80s return to his musical roots will find much to appreciate here".

== Track listing ==
1. "When You Wish Upon a Star" (Ned Washington, Leigh Harline) - 6:23
2. "Poor Butterfly" (Raymond Hubbell, John Golden) - 6:23
3. "My Romance" (Richard Rodgers, Lorenz Hart) - 5:12
4. "Embraceable You" (George Gershwin, Ira Gershwin) - 4:28
5. "The Rose Tattoo" (Jack Brooks, Harry Warren) - 6:36
6. "Time After Time" (Jule Styne, Sammy Cahn) - 6:44
7. "My Foolish Heart" (Victor Young, Ned Washington) - 4:47

- Recorded December 9 and 10, 1983 at Van Gelder Studio, Englewood Cliffs, New Jersey

== Personnel ==
- Freddie Hubbard - trumpet
- Ricky Ford - tenor saxophone
- Kenny Barron - piano
- Cecil McBee - bass
- Joe Chambers - drums
