= Skagly =

Studio album by Freddie Hubbard
- Released: 1980
- Recorded: December 1979
- Genre: Jazz
- Label: Columbia
- Producer: Dr. George Butler

Freddie Hubbard chronology
The Love Connection (1979)	Skagly (1980)	Live at the North Sea Jazz Festival (1980)

Professional ratings
Review scores
Source	Rating
AllMusic	2.5/5 stars
The Rolling Stone Jazz Record Guide	1/5 stars

Skagly is a 1980 album by jazz musician Freddie Hubbard, released on the Columbia label. It features performances by Hubbard, Hadley Caliman, Billy Childs, Phil Ranelin on all tracks except "A Summer Knows", with Paulinho da Costa guesting on two tracks and George Duke and Jeff "Skunk" Baxter guesting on one track.

== Track listing ==
1. "Happiness Is Now" - 7:52
2. "Theme from Summer of '42" (Alan Bergman, Marilyn Bergman, Michel Legrand) - 5:36
3. "Cascais" (Larry Klein) - 7:44
4. "Skagly" - 14:34
5. "Rustic Celebration" (Billy Childs) - 5:35

All compositions by Freddie Hubbard except as indicated
- Recorded at Hollywood Sound Recorders, December, 1979

== Personnel ==
- Freddie Hubbard – trumpet
- Hadley Caliman – tenor saxophone, flute
- Billy Childs – keyboards
- Larry Klein – bass
- Carl Burnett – drums
- Paulinho da Costa – percussion
- Phil Ranelin – trombone (tracks 1, 3, 4, 5)
- George Duke – claves (track 4)
- Jeff "Skunk" Baxter – guitar (track 4)
