= Splash (Freddie Hubbard album) =

Studio album by Freddie Hubbard
- Released: 1981
- Genre: Jazz
- Label: Fantasy
- Producer: Freddie Hubbard & Al Hall Jr.

Freddie Hubbard chronology
| Mistral (1981) | Splash (1981) | Rollin' (1981) |

Professional ratings
Review scores
| Source | Rating |
|---|---|
| Allmusic | 1/5 stars |
| The Rolling Stone Jazz Record Guide | 1/5 stars |

Splash is a studio album by jazz musician Freddie Hubbard released in 1981 on the Fantasy label which features performances by Hubbard with several R&B/soul session musicians.

== Reception ==
The Allmusic biography by Scott Yanow identifies the album as one of Hubbard's "low points" but still features some fine playing albeit not for pure jazz listeners.

== Track listing ==
1. "Splash" (David "Cat" Cohen, Thurlene Johnson) - 5:02
2. "Mystic Lady" - 4:53
3. "I'm Yours" (Clarence McDonald, Hall) - 4:51
4. "Touchdown" (Cohen, Don Tracy) - 5:08
5. "You're Gonna Lose Me" (Cynthia Faulkner, Jackie Morissette, Hall) (featuring Jeanie Tracy) - 5:20
6. "Sister 'Stine" - 5:24
7. "Jarri" - 6:34

All compositions by Al Hall Jr. & Freddie Hubbard except as indicated

== Personnel ==
- Freddie Hubbard - trumpet, flugelhorn, producer
- David T. Walker - guitar
- Paul Jackson Jr. - guitar
- Louis Small - keyboards
- Clarence McDonald - keyboards
- Chester Thompson - keyboards
- Ron Brown - bass
- David Shields - bass
- Jim Keltner - drums
- James Gadson - drums
- Al Hall Jr. - synthesizer, trombone, percussion, producer, arranger
- William "Buck" Clarke - percussion, conga
- Tony Flores - percussion
- Maurice "Mo" Young - backing vocals
- Jeanie Tracy - vocals, backing vocals
- Juan Escovedo - bongos
- Joe Sugayan - congas, percussion
