= Promise Me the Moon =

Studio album by the David Sanborn Band
- Released: December 1977
- Studio: Criteria (Miami, Florida); A&M (Hollywood, California)
- Genre: Jazz
- Length: 37:08
- Label: Warner Bros.
- Producer: Dale Oehler

The David Sanborn Band chronology
David Sanborn (1976)	Promise Me the Moon (1977)	Heart to Heart (1978)

Professional ratings
Review scores
Source	Rating
The Rolling Stone Jazz Record Guide	3/5 stars

Promise Me the Moon is an album by the David Sanborn Band, released in December 1977 through Warner Bros. Records and reissued by Wounded Bird Records many years later. The album reached number 27 on Billboard's Jazz Albums chart.

== Track listing ==
1. "Promise Me the Moon" (Danny Kortchmar) - 3:58
2. "Benjamin" (James Taylor) - 1:29
3. "Stranger's Arms" (Kortchmar) - 4:20
4. "Heart Lake" (Mark Egan) - 5:19
5. "The Rev" (Hiram Bullock) - 3:54
6. "We Fool Ourselves" (Bullock) - 5:12
7. "Morning Salsa" (Herb Bushler, Rosalinda De Leon) - 6:05
8. "The Legend of Cheops" (Victor Lewis) - 6:34

== Personnel ==
- David Sanborn – alto saxophone, sopranino saxophone, lyricon, vocals (3)
- Rosalinda de Leon – keyboards
- Dale Oehler – electric piano (2)
- Hiram Bullock – guitars, vocals (1, 6)
- Mark Egan – electric bass
- Victor Lewis – drums
- Jumma Santos – percussion
- Christine Faith – additional vocals
- Lani Groves – additional vocals
- Kat McCord – additional vocals
- Hamish Stuart – additional vocals

Production

- Theresa Del Pozzo – executive producer
- Dale Oehler – producer
- Alex Sadkin – recording, mixing (1, 5–8)
- Jack Nuber – assistant engineer
- Hank Cicalo – mixing (2–4)
- Milt Cailce – mix assistant (2–4)
- Steve Katz – mix assistant (2–4)
- Bernie Grundman – mastering
- Ritch Barnes – artwork, photography
- Stephen Pettigrew – artwork, photography
- Loy – artwork, photography
- Patsy Norvell – typography
