= Keystone Bop: Sunday Night =

Live album by Freddie Hubbard, Joe Henderson & Bobby Hutcherson
- Released: 1982
- Recorded: November 29, 1981
- Genre: Jazz
- Length: 64:57
- Label: Prestige
- Producer: Ed Michel, Freddie Hubbard

Freddie Hubbard, Joe Henderson & Bobby Hutcherson chronology
Keystone Bop Vol. 2: Friday & Saturday (1981)	Keystone Bop: Sunday Night (1982)	Born to Be Blue (1982)

Professional ratings
Review scores
Source	Rating
Allmusic	3/5 stars
The Rolling Stone Jazz Record Guide	4/5 stars
The Penguin Guide to Jazz Recordings	3/4 stars

Keystone Bop: Sunday Night is a live album by jazz trumpeter Freddie Hubbard, featuring tenor saxophonist Joe Henderson and vibraphonist Bobby Hutcherson. Recorded on Sunday, November 29, 1981, and released in this form by the Prestige label in 1994. The Allmusic review by Scott Yanow states "Hubbard fans can be assured that this set finds him in excellent form on a good night".

== Track listing ==
All compositions by Freddie Hubbard except as indicated

1. "Birdlike" - 14:12
2. "The Littlest One of All" (Bobby Hutcherson) - 9:14
3. "The Intrepid Fox" - 14:05
4. "Sky Dive" - 16:42
5. "Body and Soul" (Frank Eyton, Johnny Green, Edward Heyman, Robert Sour) - 10:44

- Recorded at Keystone Korner, San Francisco, California on November 29, 1981

== Personnel ==
- Freddie Hubbard - trumpet
- Joe Henderson - tenor saxophone
- Bobby Hutcherson - vibraphone
- Billy Childs - piano
- Larry Klein - double bass
- Steve Houghton - drums
