= Blues for Miles =

Studio album by Freddie Hubbard
- Released: 1992
- Recorded: April 3–4, 1992
- Studio: Alfa Studio A, Tokyo, Japan.
- Genre: Jazz
- Label: Alfa, Evidence
- Producer: Tetsuo Hara, Makoto Kimata

Freddie Hubbard chronology
Live at Fat Tuesday's (1992)	Blues for Miles (1992)	MMTC: Monk, Miles, Trane & Cannon (1995)

Professional ratings
Review scores
Source	Rating
AllMusic	2.5/5 stars

Blues for Miles is an album by American jazz trumpeter Freddie Hubbard recorded in April 1992 in Tokyo and released on the Alfa and Evidence label. It features performances by Hubbard, Billy Childs, Tony Dumas, and Ralph Penland.

== Reception ==
The AllMusic review by Alex Henderson states "Although not among Hubbard's great albums, Blues for Miles is generally likable".

== Track listing ==
1. "The Thrill Is Gone" (Lew Brown, Ray Henderson) - 8:04
2. "I'm a Fool to Want You" (Joel Herron, Frank Sinatra, Jack Wolf) -7:46
3. "Come Rain or Come Shine" (Harold Arlen, Johnny Mercer) - 8:25
4. "Autumn Leaves" (Joseph Kosma, Mercer, Jacques Prévert) - 6:22
5. "Gypsy Lament" (María Mendez Grever) - 5:00
6. "Blues for Miles (Hip-Hop Bop)" (Hubbard) - 7:30
7. "Skylark" (Hoagy Carmichael, Mercer) - 8:17
8. "Tenderly" (Walter Gross, Jack Lawrence) - 5:42

== Personnel ==
- Freddie Hubbard – trumpet
- Billy Childs – piano
- Tony Dumas – bass
- Ralph Penland – drums
