= The Hub of Hubbard =

Studio album by Freddie Hubbard
- Released: 1970 (Germany); November 1972 (US)
- Recorded: December 9, 1969
- Studio: MPS Studios, Villingen, Germany
- Genre: Jazz
- Length: 35:13; 40:44 (CD)
- Label: MPS; MPS 15267
- Producer: Joachim-Ernst Berendt

Freddie Hubbard chronology
The Black Angel (1969)	The Hub of Hubbard (1970)	Red Clay (1970)

Professional ratings
Review scores
Source	Rating
Allmusic	4.5/5 stars
DownBeat	4/5 stars

The Hub of Hubbard is an album by trumpeter Freddie Hubbard. It was recorded at Villingen, Black Forest, Germany on December 9, 1969. It was released on the MPS label and features performances by Hubbard, Eddie Daniels, Sir Roland Hanna, Richard Davis and Louis Hayes.

== Track listing ==
1. "Without a Song" (Edward Eliscu, Billy Rose, Vincent Youmans) - 12:50
2. "Just One of Those Things" (Cole Porter) - 7:14
3. "Blues for Duane" (Freddie Hubbard) - 7:32
4. "The Things We Did Last Summer" (Sammy Cahn, Jule Styne) - 7:19
5. "Muses for Richard Davis" (Hanna) - 5:49 Bonus track on CD reissue

== Personnel ==
- Freddie Hubbard - trumpet
- Eddie Daniels - tenor saxophone
- Roland Hanna - piano
- Richard Davis - bass
- Louis Hayes - drums
