= At Jazz Jamboree Warszawa '91: A Tribute to Miles =

Live album by Freddie Hubbard
- Released: 2000
- Recorded: October 24, 1991
- Genre: Jazz
- Label: Sunburst

Freddie Hubbard chronology
Bolivia (1991)	At Jazz Jamboree Warszawa '91: A Tribute to Miles (2000)	Live at Fat Tuesday's (1992)

Professional ratings
Review scores
Source	Rating
Allmusic	2.5/5 stars

At Jazz Jamboree Warszawa '91: A Tribute to Miles is a live album by trumpeter Freddie Hubbard recorded in October 1991 and released on the Starburst label in 2000. It features performances by Hubbard, Ronnie Mathews, Don Braden, Jeff Chambers and Ralph Penland.

== Reception ==
The Allmusic review by Ken Dryden states "Although Hubbard's group provides sufficient support, the trumpeter's earlier recordings are far superior to this disappointing release... This CD can safely be bypassed"

== Track listing ==
1. "Bolivia" (Cedar Walton) - 12:59
2. "God Bless the Child" (Arthur Herzog Jr., Billie Holiday) - 12:53
3. "All Blues" (Miles Davis) - 17:10
4. "Dear John" (Freddie Hubbard) - 17:01
- Recorded at the Jazz Jamboree Warszawa on October 24, 1991

== Personnel ==
- Freddie Hubbard - trumpet
- Don Braden - tenor saxophone
- Ronnie Mathews - piano
- Jeff Chambers - bass
- Ralph Penland - drums
