= Penland (surname) =

Penland is a surname. Notable people with the surname include:

- Ralph Penland (1953–2014), American jazz drummer
- Theodore Penland, last commander of the Grand Army of the Republic
