= Red Clay =

Studio album by Freddie Hubbard
- Released: May 1970
- Recorded: January 27–29, 1970
- Studios: Van Gelder Studio, Englewood Cliffs, NJ
- Genres: Jazz fusion, soul jazz
- Length: 38:57 (original LP)
- Labels: CTI; CTI 6001
- Producer: Creed Taylor

Freddie Hubbard chronology
The Hub of Hubbard (1970)	Red Clay (1970)	Straight Life (1971)

Red Clay is an album recorded in 1970 by jazz trumpeter Freddie Hubbard. It was his first album on Creed Taylor's CTI label and marked a shift toward the soul-jazz fusion sounds that would dominate his recordings in the later part of the decade. It entered at number 20 on Billboard’s Top 20 Best Selling Jazz LPs, on June 20, 1970.

== Reception ==
Professional ratings
Review scores
Source	Rating
AllMusic	5/5 stars
The Penguin Guide to Jazz Recordings	3.5/4 stars
The Rolling Stone Jazz Record Guide	4/5 stars

Bill Milkowski of JazzTimes commented: "...Red Clay, an album that would not only define Hubbard's direction over the next decade while setting the template for all future CTI recordings, but would also have a dramatic impact on a generation of trumpet players coming up in the ’70s. ’Red Clay’ would become Hubbard's signature tune throughout his career." Thom Jurek of AllMusic stated: "This may be Freddie Hubbard's finest moment as a leader, in that it embodies and utilizes all of his strengths as a composer, soloist, and frontman. On Red Clay, Hubbard combines hard bop's glorious blues-out past with the soulful innovations of mainstream jazz in the 1960s, and reads them through the chunky groove innovations of '70s jazz fusion... This is a classic, hands down." Tom Moon, in 1,000 Recordings to Hear Before You Die, wrote that "Red Clay is one of those records that mucks up the neat evolution narrative of jazz."

== Track listing ==
All compositions by Freddie Hubbard except where noted

1. "Red Clay" – 12:11
2. "Delphia" – 7:23
3. "Suite Sioux" – 8:38
4. "The Intrepid Fox" – 10:45
5. "Cold Turkey" (John Lennon) – 10:27 (recorded at original session; not released until CD issue)
6. "Red Clay" [Live] – 18:44 Bonus track on the 2001 and 2010 CD releases
- Recorded at Van Gelder Studio, Englewood Cliffs, New Jersey, January 27–29, 1970 except track 6 recorded live at the Southgate Palace in Los Angeles on July 19, 1971.

== Personnel ==
- Freddie Hubbard – trumpet
- Joe Henderson – tenor saxophone, flute (tracks 1–5)
- Herbie Hancock – electric piano, Hammond organ (tracks 1–5)
- Ron Carter – bass
- Lenny White – drums (tracks 1–5)

=== Track 6 additional personnel ===
- Stanley Turrentine – tenor saxophone
- Johnny "Hammond" Smith – electric piano
- George Benson – guitar
- Billy Cobham – drums
- Airto Moreira – percussion

== Charts ==
Chart performance for Red Clay
Chart (1970)	Peak position
US Top R&B/Hip-Hop Albums (Billboard)	40
