= Ride Like the Wind (album) =

Studio album by Freddie Hubbard
- Released: 1982
- Recorded: June 13–14, 1981
- Studio: Ocean Way Recording, Hollywood, CA
- Genre: Jazz
- Length: 37:29
- Label: Elektra/Musician
- Producer: Jeffrey Weber

Freddie Hubbard chronology
Born to Be Blue (1982)	Ride Like the Wind (1982)	Above & Beyond (1999)

Professional ratings
Review scores
Source	Rating
Allmusic	3/5 stars
The Rolling Stone Jazz Record Guide	4/5 stars

Ride Like the Wind is an album by jazz musician Freddie Hubbard recorded direct to two-track digital and released on the Elektra/Musician label.

== Track listing ==
1. "Hubbard's Cupboard" (Allyn Ferguson) - 4:54
2. "This Is It" (Kenny Loggins, Michael McDonald) - 4:35
3. "Condition Alpha" (Allyn Ferguson) - 4:52
4. "Ride Like the Wind" (Christopher Cross) - 4:54
5. "Birdland" (Joe Zawinul) - 6:21
6. "Bridgitte" (Hubbard) - 6:13
7. "Two Moods for Freddie" (Allyn Ferguson) - 5:23

== Personnel ==
- Freddie Hubbard - trumpet, flugelhorn
- Bill Maxwell - drums
- Joe Porcaro - percussion
- Abe Laboriel - bass
- Bill Mays - keyboards
- Dan Ferguson - guitars
- Plus string orchestra and big band conducted and arranged by Allyn Ferguson
- Bud Shank - alto saxophone, flute
- Bill Perkins - tenor saxophone
- Bob Tricarico - baritone saxophone
- Chuck Findley - lead trumpet, flugelhorn
- Gary Grant - trumpet, flugelhorn
- Bill Watrous - trombone
- Vincent DeRosa - French horn
- Tommy Johnson - tuba

== Chart performance ==
Year	Chart	Position
1983	US Billboard Jazz Albums	24
