= Mistral (album) =

Studio album by Freddie Hubbard
- Released: 1981
- Recorded: September 15–19, 1980
- Studio: Ocean Way Recording
- Genre: Jazz
- Label: Eastworld/Liberty
- Producer: John Koenig, Nobuo Ohtani

Freddie Hubbard chronology
Live at the North Sea Jazz Festival (1980)	Mistral (1981)	Outpost (1981)

Mistral is a studio album by jazz trumpeter Freddie Hubbard that was released by Eastworld and Liberty with Phil Ranelin, Art Pepper, George Cables, Peter Wolf, Roland Bautista, Stanley Clarke, Peter Erskine, and Paulinho da Costa.

== Reception ==
Professional ratings
Review scores
Source	Rating
AllMusic	2/5 stars
The Rolling Stone Jazz Record Guide	3/5 stars

Scott Yanow of AllMusic stated, "Compared to his live performances, this studio recording is a disappointment. Altoist Art Pepper and keyboardist George Cables have a few spots but the arrangements are a bit commercial, the originals (three by trumpeter Freddie Hubbard and one apiece from Cables and bassist Stanley Clarke) are forgettable and no one sounds like they are sweating. This LP is one of Hubbard's lesser efforts."

== Track listing ==
All compositions by Freddie Hubbard except as indicated

1. "Sunshine Lady" (Stanley Clarke) - 7:18
2. "Eclipse" - 7:08
3. "Blue Nights" (George Cables) - 7:17
4. "Now I've Found Love" - 6:53
5. "I Love You" (Cole Porter) - 7:27
6. "Bring It Back Home" - 7:55
- Recorded September 15, 17, 18 & 19, 1980, at Ocean Way Recording, Hollywood, CA

== Personnel ==
- Freddie Hubbard - trumpet, flugelhorn
- Phil Ranelin - trombone
- Art Pepper - alto saxophone
- George Cables - piano, electric piano
- Peter Wolf - synthesizer
- Roland Bautista - guitar
- Stanley Clarke - bass, electric bass
- Peter Erskine - drums
- Paulinho da Costa - percussion
