= The Artistry of Freddie Hubbard =

Studio album by Freddie Hubbard
- Released: End of February/early March 1963
- Recorded: July 2, 1962
- Studios: Van Gelder, Englewood Cliffs, NJ
- Genre: Jazz
- Length: 42:40
- Labels: Impulse! A-27
- Producer: Bob Thiele

Freddie Hubbard chronology
Ready for Freddie (1961)	The Artistry of Freddie Hubbard (1963)	Hub-Tones (1962)

Professional ratings
Review scores
Source	Rating
AllMusic	4/5 stars
DownBeat	3/5 stars
The Rolling Stone Jazz & Blues Album Guide	4.5/5 stars

The Artistry of Freddie Hubbard is a 1963 album by trumpeter Freddie Hubbard, his first for Impulse! It contains performances by Hubbard, Curtis Fuller, John Gilmore, Tommy Flanagan, Art Davis and Louis Hayes.

== Track listing ==
All compositions by Freddie Hubbard except where noted

1. "Caravan" (Duke Ellington, Irving Mills, Juan Tizol) – 7:28
2. "Bob's Place" – 10:03
3. "Happy Times" – 4:29
4. "Summertime" (George Gershwin, Ira Gershwin, Dubose Heyward) – 10:06
5. "The 7th Day" – 10:34

== Personnel ==
- Freddie Hubbard – trumpet
- Curtis Fuller – trombone
- John Gilmore – tenor saxophone
- Tommy Flanagan – piano
- Art Davis – bass
- Louis Hayes – drums

== Charts ==
Chart performance for The Artistry of Freddie Hubbard
Chart (2026)	Peak position
Greek Albums (IFPI)	68
