= Tina Brooks =

American jazz saxophonist and composer

- Photo by Francis Wolff

Background information
- Also known as: Tina Brooks
- Born: Harold Floyd Brooks; June 7, 1932; Fayetteville, North Carolina, United States
- Died: August 13, 1974 (aged 42) New York City, New York
- Genres: Hard bop
- Occupations: Musician, composer, bandleader
- Instrument: Tenor saxophone
- Years active: 1951–1961
- Label: Blue Note
- Formerly of: Freddie Hubbard; Jackie McLean; Freddie Redd; Kenny Burrell; Jimmy Smith

Harold Floyd "Tina" Brooks (June 7, 1932 – August 13, 1974) was an American jazz tenor saxophonist and composer best remembered for his work in the hard bop style.

== Early years ==
Harold Floyd Brooks was born in Fayetteville, North Carolina, and was the brother of David "Bubba" Brooks. The nickname "Tina", pronounced Teena, was a variation of "Teeny", a childhood moniker. His favourite tune was "My Devotion". He studied harmony and theory with Herbert Bourne.

Initially, he studied the C-melody saxophone, which he began playing shortly after he moved to New York with his family in 1944. Brooks' first professional work came in 1951 with rhythm and blues pianist Sonny Thompson, and in 1955 Brooks played with vibraphonist Lionel Hampton. Brooks also received less-formal guidance from trumpeter and composer "Little" Benny Harris, who led the saxophonist to his first recording as a leader. Harris recommended Brooks to Blue Note producer Alfred Lion in 1958.

== Recordings ==
Brooks is best known for his recordings for the Blue Note label between 1958 and 1961, recording as a sideman with Kenny Burrell, Freddie Hubbard, Jackie McLean, Freddie Redd, and Jimmy Smith. Around the same period, Brooks was McLean's understudy in The Connection, a play by Jack Gelber with music by Redd, and performed on an album of music from the play on Felsted Records, a session which also featured Howard McGhee.

Brooks recorded five sessions of his own for Blue Note (including one jointly with McLean). The first session was recorded on March 16, 1958 at the Van Gelder Studio in Hackensack, New Jersey, and featured trumpeter Lee Morgan alongside seasoned professionals such as Sonny Clark, Doug Watkins and Art Blakey. However, for unknown reasons, Minor Move was not released for more than two decades, several years after Brooks had died. This started an unfortunate trend, as three of his four other sessions (Street Singer, Back to the Tracks and The Waiting Game) did not appear during his lifetime. The exception was True Blue, a session recorded on June 25, 1960 with Freddie Hubbard, Duke Jordan, Sam Jones and Art Taylor. The release of True Blue coincided with the release of Hubbard's Blue Note debut album, Open Sesame (also featuring Brooks, who wrote the opening title track as well as "Gypsy Blue"), and was not actively promoted.

Brooks did not record after 1961. Plagued by heroin dependency, and gradually deteriorating health, he died of liver failure at age 42.

== Legacy and Musical Revival ==
Until 1980, True Blue remained the only Brooks album commercially released. In 1980, Blue Note Japan released the Minor Move and Street Singer albums, the latter jointly credited to Jackie McLean. In 1985, Mosaic Records released The Complete Blue Note Recordings Of The Tina Brooks Quintets on a 4-LP set, which made Back to the Tracks and The Waiting Game available for the first time. The Mosaic set, a limited edition produced by Michael Cuscuna, is out of print. In the CD era, all of Brooks' Blue Note sessions as a leader or co-leader have been released on CD, including on releases by Blue Note Japan and Blue Note's Connoisseur series.

In the liner notes for the CD release of Back to the Tracks, Cuscuna wrote: "Far lesser talents have been far more celebrated" and that Brooks "was a unique, sensitive improviser who could weave beautiful and complex tapestries through his horn. His lyricism, unity of ideas and inner logic were astounding."

David Rosenthal in his book Hard Bop: Jazz and Black Music 1955-1965 wrote about Brooks. Of his composition "Street Singer", Rosenthal wrote that it is "an authentic hard-bop classic" where "pathos, irony and rage come together in a performance at once anguished and sinister."

The official Blue Note website says of Brooks: "With a strong, smooth tone and an amazing flow of fresh ideas every time he soloed, tenor saxophonist Tina Brooks should have been a major jazz artist, but his legacy is confined to a series of dates that he did for Blue Note as a sideman and leader" and that he "was one of the most brilliant, if underrated, tenor saxophonists in modern jazz."

== Discography ==
All on Blue Note Records, unless otherwise indicated.

=== As leader/co-leader ===
Recording date	Title	Year released	Notes
1958-03-16	Minor Move	1980	
1960-06-25	True Blue	1960	
1960-09-01	Street Singer with Jackie McLean	1980	Japan only
1960-09-01, 1960-10-20	Back to the Tracks	1998	
1961-03-02	The Waiting Game	1999	Initially Japan only

=== As sideman ===
With Kenny Burrell

- Blue Lights Volume 1 & 2 (1958)
- On View at the Five Spot Cafe (1959) – live
- Swingin' (1980) – rec. 1956–59

With Freddie Redd

- Shades of Redd (1960)
- Redd's Blues (1988) – rec. 1961

With Jimmy Smith

- House Party (1958) – rec. 1957-58
- The Sermon! (1959) – rec. 1957-58
- Cool Blues (1980) – rec. 1958

With others

- Freddie Hubbard, Open Sesame (1960)
- Howard McGhee, Music from the Connection (Felsted, 1960)
- Jackie McLean, Jackie's Bag (1961) – rec. 1959–60
- Sonny Thompson & His Orchestra, The Complete Recordings, Volume 2 (1949–1951) (Blue Moon, 2002)
