= Keystone Bop Vol. 2: Friday & Saturday =

Live album

Live album by Freddie Hubbard, Joe Henderson & Bobby Hutcherson
- Released: 1996
- Recorded: November 27–28, 1981
- Genre: Jazz
- Length: 69:35
- Label: Prestige
- Producer: Ed Michel, Freddie Hubbard

Freddie Hubbard, Joe Henderson & Bobby Hutcherson chronology
Rollin' (1982)	Keystone Bop Vol. 2: Friday & Saturday (1996)	Keystone Bop: Sunday Night (1982)

Professional ratings
Review scores
Source	Rating
Allmusic	3/5 stars
The Penguin Guide to Jazz Recordings	3/4 stars

Keystone Bop Vol. 2: Friday & Saturday is a live album by jazz musicians Freddie Hubbard, Joe Henderson & Bobby Hutcherson recorded in November 1981 and released on the Prestige label in 1996. The Allmusic review by Rick Anderson states "if you're expecting tight, hard-driving conventional bop, you'll be disappointed. These renditions average out to over 17 minutes each, with all the discursive extravagance that treatment implies. But that's not all bad, by any means... But it's hard not to think that offering more, briefer tunes wouldn't have made these performances a bit more interesting and fun overall. Still, fans won't be disappointed".

== Track listing ==
All compositions by Freddie Hubbard except as indicated

1. "One of Another Kind" – 17:30
2. "'Round Midnight" (Thelonious Monk) – 12:16
3. "Red Clay" – 19:45
4. "First Light" – 20:04
- Recorded at Keystone Korner, San Francisco, California on November 27 & 28, 1981

== Personnel ==
- Freddie Hubbard - trumpet
- Joe Henderson - tenor saxophone
- Bobby Hutcherson - vibes
- Billy Childs - piano
- Larry Klein - bass
- Steve Houghton - drums
