= The Black Angel (album) =

Studio album by Freddie Hubbard
- Released: 1970
- Recorded: May 16, 1969
- Studio: Regent Sound Studios, New York City
- Genre: Jazz
- Length: 45:36
- Label: Atlantic; SD 1549
- Producer: Gil Fuller

Freddie Hubbard chronology
A Soul Experiment (1969)	The Black Angel (1970)	The Hub of Hubbard (1969)

Professional ratings
Review scores
Source	Rating
Allmusic	3/5 stars
DownBeat	4/5 stars
The Penguin Guide to Jazz Recordings	2.5/4 stars

The Black Angel is a studio album by American jazz trumpeter Freddie Hubbard, recorded in 1969 and released in 1970. It was his fourth release on the Atlantic label and features performances by Hubbard, James Spaulding, Kenny Barron, Reggie Workman, Louis Hayes and Carlos "Patato" Valdes.

== Reception ==
Al Campbell of AllMusic commented "Freddie Hubbard released The Black Angel in the same year as the landmark Miles Davis album Bitches Brew. It's obvious Hubbard wanted to appeal to the emerging crossover rock/jazz crowd of the era. The presence of bop, however, still permeated Hubbard's playing, unlike Miles who had long since dropped the form... An enjoyable session leaving the impression Hubbard was preparing to take a different musical direction". Harvey Pekar, in a contemporary review for DownBeat, wrote "this isn't a great LP but the selections on it are varied and none is less than good in quality", awarding the album four stars.

== Track listing ==
All compositions by Freddie Hubbard except as indicated

1. "Spacetrack" - 16:58
2. "Eclipse" - 8:19
3. "The Black Angel" (Kenny Barron) - 8:19
4. "Gittin' Down" - 6:40
5. "Coral Keys" (Walter Bishop Jr.) - 5:20

== Personnel ==
- Freddie Hubbard - trumpet, flugelhorn
- James Spaulding - alto saxophone, flute
- Kenny Barron - piano, electric piano
- Reggie Workman - bass
- Louis Hayes - drums
- Carlos "Patato" Valdes - conga, maracas
