= Above & Beyond (album) =

Live album by Freddie Hubbard
- Released: 1999
- Recorded: June 17, 1982
- Genre: Jazz
- Length: 68:17
- Label: Metropolitan

Freddie Hubbard chronology
Ride Like the Wind (1982)	Above & Beyond (1999)	Back to Birdland (1983)

Professional ratings
Review scores
Source	Rating
Allmusic	4.5/5 stars

Above & Beyond is a live album by jazz musician Freddie Hubbard recorded on June 17, 1982, at San Francisco's Keystone Korner and released on the Metropolitan label in 1999. The Allmusic review by Scott Yanow calls Hubbard's playing on the album "stunning improvisations full of fire, technical wizardry and creative ideas".

== Track listing ==
All compositions by Freddie Hubbard except as indicated

1. "Softly, as in a Morning Sunrise" (Oscar Hammerstein II, Sigmund Romberg) – 17:59
2. "I Love You" (Cole Porter) – 9:07
3. "Thermo" – 12:57
4. "Little Sunflower" (Hubbard, Al Jarreau) – 16:57
5. "Byrdlike" – 11:17

- Recorded at Keystone Korner, San Francisco; June 17, 1982

== Personnel ==
- Freddie Hubbard – trumpet
- Billy Childs – piano
- Herbie Lewis: bass
- Louis Hayes – drums
