= Hub Cap (album) =

Studio album by Freddie Hubbard
- Released: October 1961
- Recorded: April 9, 1961
- Studio: Van Gelder, Englewood Cliffs, NJ
- Genre: Jazz
- Length: 42:21
- Label: Blue Note; BST 84073
- Producer: Alfred Lion

Freddie Hubbard chronology
Goin' Up (1960)	Hub Cap (1961)	Ready for Freddie (1962)

Hub Cap is an album by trumpeter Freddie Hubbard, released on the Blue Note label in 1961 as BLP 4073 and BST 84073. It features performances by Hubbard, Julian Priester, Jimmy Heath, Cedar Walton, Larry Ridley and Philly Joe Jones.

== The pieces ==
The album's title originates from Hubbard's nickname. The track "Cry Me Not", composed by Randy Weston for the session and arranged by Melba Liston, was considered by Hubbard to be "the most interesting tune on the record". "Luana" is dedicated to Hubbard's niece, whilst "Osie Mae" – a title which sounded "funky" to Hubbard – is characterized by an A-B-A-B pattern. "Earmon Jr.", composed by Hubbard and arranged by Ed Summerlin, was named for Hubbard's brother, a pianist.

== Reception ==
Professional ratings
Review scores
Source	Rating
AllMusic	3.5/5 stars
The Penguin Guide to Jazz Recordings	3/4 stars

Reviewing the album for The Guardian in 2003, British jazz critic John Fordham wrote:

From Hubbard's opening solo on the flying, boppish title track, which crackles with his trademark urgency, crisp, flaring sound and hell-for-leather attack, the music throws you back into a jazz era when the muscular dynamism of hard-bop was at the sharp end of a still commercially popular jazz.

Jimmy Heath's tenor sax has a dry loquacity, and drummer Philly Joe Jones sustains a constant push and chatter of hi-hat snaps, swishing cymbal caresses and rimshot rattles. And for all the idiom's prevailing speediness, it's the pulsating warmth of the arrangement and Hubbard's balance of spaciousness and fitfully unleashed power on Randy Weston's rhapsodic "Cry Me Not" that is a particular highlight of a memorable set.

== Track listing ==
"Osie Mae"
Osie Mae

All compositions by Freddie Hubbard, except as indicated

1. "Hub Cap" – 5:17
2. "Cry Me Not" (Randy Weston) – 4:49
3. "Luana" – 10:04
4. "Osie Mae" – 6:53
5. "Plexus" (Cedar Walton) – 9:02
6. "Plexus" [alternate take] (Walton) – 9:10 (1988 Capitol CD re-release only)
7. "Earmon Jr." – 6:16

== Personnel ==
- Freddie Hubbard – trumpet
- Julian Priester – trombone
- Jimmy Heath – tenor saxophone
- Cedar Walton – piano
- Larry Ridley – bass
- Philly Joe Jones – drums

Technical personnel

- Alfred Lion – producer
- Rudy Van Gelder – recording
- Francis Wolff – cover photo
- Reid Miles – cover design
