= Outpost (Freddie Hubbard album) =

Studio album by Freddie Hubbard
- Released: 1981
- Recorded: March 16–17, 1981
- Genre: Jazz
- Label: Enja
- Producer: Horst Weber

Freddie Hubbard chronology
Mistral (1981)	Outpost (1981)	Splash (1981)

Professional ratings
Review scores
Source	Rating
Allmusic	4/5 stars
The Rolling Stone Jazz Record Guide	3/5 stars

Outpost is a studio album by jazz musician Freddie Hubbard released in 1981 on the Enja label which features performances by Hubbard, Kenny Barron, Buster Williams and Al Foster.

== Track listing ==
1. "Santa Anna Winds" - 9:36
2. "You Don't Know What Love Is" (DePaul, Raye) - 6:31
3. "Hub-Tones" (as "The Outpost Blues") - 4:18
4. "Dual Force" (Williams) - 7:10
5. "Les" (as "Loss") (Dolphy) - 10:02

All compositions by Freddie Hubbard except as indicated
- Recorded on March 16 & 17, 1981

== Personnel ==
- Freddie Hubbard: trumpet
- Kenny Barron: piano
- Buster Williams: bass
- Al Foster: drums
