= Baby Come Out Tonight =

Studio album by Kat McCord
- Released: 1979
- Recorded: 1972–1978
- Studio: Mediasound, New York City; Big Apple Recording, New York City
- Genre: Rock, funk, soul, blues
- Length: 34:04
- Label: Manhattan Records; MR-LA952-H
- Producer: Gary Klein

Kat McCord chronology
Kathy McCord (1970)	Baby Come Out Tonight (1979)	New Jersey to Woodstock (2010)

Baby Come Out Tonight is the second album by American singer Kathy McCord, released in 1979 by Manhattan Records.

== Background ==
The tracks collected on the album are re-recorded versions of unreleased songs, some of which will later be released on a second CD of the compilation New Jersey to Woodstock.

The title track was written for Dolly Parton's album Here You Come Again, which was released two years earlier by the same producer.

== Track listing ==
All tracks are written by Kat McCord.

No.	Title	Length
1.	"Baby Come Out Tonight"	2:55
2.	"That's A Love That's Real"	3:12
3.	"Our Love Will Carry On"	4:48
4.	"You'd Convince The Devil"	3:05
5.	"You Got De Best Of Me"	2:37
6.	"Walkin' In Sunshine"	3:28
7.	"There's A Comin Change"	3:30
8.	"Louisiana Man"	3:37
9.	"Don't Need To Worry"	3:07
10.	"Keep Peace In The Family"	3:45

== Personnel ==
- Kat McCord – lead vocals, harmony vocals
- Kal David – acoustic guitar, electric guitar, backing vocals
- Arti Funaro – acoustic guitar, electric guitar, backing vocals
- Hugh McCracken – electric guitar
- John Tropea – electric guitar
- Jerry Friedman – electric guitar (on track 1)
- Paul Harris – piano, organ (on track 3)
- Richard Tee – piano
- Pat Rebillot – acoustic piano, electric piano (fender rhodes)
- Gordon Edwards – bass guitar
- Harvey Brooks – bass guitar, acoustic bass (on track 1)
- Bob Babbitt – bass guitar (fender) (on track 5)
- Bob Leinbach – trombone solo (on track 7), backing vocals
- Allan Schwartzberg – drums
- Chris Parker – drums
- Wells Kelly – drums, congas
- Michael Brecker – tenor saxophone (on track 4), horns
- Jon Faddis – horns
- Lew Del Gatto – horns
- Lou Marini – horns
- Randy Brecker – horns
- Tom Malone – horns
- Charlie Calello – arranger (horns), conductor (horns)
- Gary Klein – electric piano (fender rhodes) (on track 1), producer

Artistic personnel

- Nick Sangiamo – photography
- J.J. Stelmach – art direction

== Release history ==
List of release dates, showing country, record label, and format
Region	Date	Label	Catalog Number	Format
USA	1979	Manhattan Records	MR-LA952-H	LP
Netherlands	1979	Mercury Records	9124 383	LP
