= Phil Ranelin =

American jazz trombonist (born 1939

- Born: May 25, 1939 (age 87); Indianapolis, US
- Genres: Jazz, experimental music
- Occupation: Musician
- Instrument: Trombone

Phil Ranelin (born May 25, 1939) is an American jazz and experimental music trombonist.

== Career ==
Ranelin was born in Indianapolis and lived in New York City, before moving to Detroit in the 1960s. He played as a session musician on many Motown recordings, including with Stevie Wonder. In 1971, he and Wendell Harrison formed a group called The Tribe, which was an avant-garde jazz ensemble devoted to black consciousness. Alongside it he co-founded Tribe Records. He released several albums as a leader in the 1970s, and continued with The Tribe project until 1978. Following this, Ranelin worked with Freddie Hubbard.

Ranelin worked mostly locally in Detroit in the following decades, and did not find widespread acceptance among jazz aficionados. However, he eventually came to the attention of rare groove collectors who became increasingly interested in his work. As a result, Tortoise drummer John McEntire remastered some of Ranelin's older material and re-released it on Hefty Records. A remix album soon followed, which included an appearance from Telefon Tel Aviv.

== Discography ==
- Message from the Tribe (Tribe, 1972)
- The Time Is Now! (Tribe, 1974; reissued Hefty, 2001)
- Vibes from the Tribe (Tribe, 1975; reissued Hefty, 2001)
- Love Dream (Rebirth, 1986)
- A Close Encounter of the Very Best Kind (Lifeforce, 1996)
- Remixes (Hefty, 2002)
- Inspiration (Wide Hive, 2004)
- Living a New Day (Wide Hive, 2009)
- Reminiscence (Wide Hive, 2009)
- Perseverance with Henry Franklin and Big Black (Wide Hive, 2011)
- Infinite Expressions (Org Music, 2022)

=== As sideman ===
With Freddie Hubbard

- The Love Connection (Columbia, 1979)
- Skagly (Columbia, 1979)
- Mistral (Liberty, 1980)
- Pinnacle (Resonance, 1980 [2011])

With Freddie Redd

- Everybody Loves a Winner (Milestone, 1991)

With Red Hot Chili Peppers

- The Red Hot Chili Peppers (EMI, 1984)
