= Back to the Tracks =

Studio album by Tina Brooks
- Released: January 27, 1998 (separate album,. US)
- Recorded: September 1 and October 20, 1960
- Studio: Van Gelder Studio, Englewood Cliffs, NJ
- Genre: Jazz
- Length: 38:32
- Label: Blue Note; Blue Note 21737
- Producer: Alfred Lion

Tina Brooks chronology
| True Blue (1960) | Back to the Tracks (1998) | The Waiting Game (1961) |

Alternative cover
- Re-release BST 84052

Back to the Tracks is a hard bop album by tenor saxophonist Tina Brooks recorded in 1960 and released posthumously. The album was originally intended as BLP 4052, but, for some reason, it was shelved at the time. A song recorded during the session, "David the King", was rejected since it "never made it to releasable quality". The composition was later re-recorded for Brooks' final Blue Note session, eventually released as The Waiting Game. The tracks first appeared in a Mosaic 12" LP box-set (MR4-106) entitled The Complete Blue Note Recordings of The Tina Brooks Quintets. A Blue Note CD (purple cover, Blue Note 21737) appeared in 1998, then reissued in 2006 (green cover, BST 84052).

Most of the album was recorded in October 1960 by Brooks, Blue Mitchell, Kenny Drew, Paul Chambers and Art Taylor. One of the album's tracks was recorded in September 1960 by the same group with the addition of alto saxophonist Jackie McLean. The full session with McLean was eventually released by Blue Note Japan as Street Singer and credited to both Brooks and McLean. (Three tracks from the September Street Singer session with McLean were first released on the McLean's 1960 album Jackie's Bag.)

== Reception ==
Professional ratings
Review scores
| Source | Rating |
|---|---|
| Allmusic | 4.5/5 stars |
| The Penguin Guide to Jazz Recordings | 3/4 stars |

Stephen Erlewine, writing for Allmusic, states: "Listening to Back to the Tracks, it's impossible to figure out why the record wasn't released at the time, but it's a hard bop gem from the early '60s to cherish."

David H. Rosenthal in his work Hard Bop: Jazz and Black Music 1955-1965 dedicated a number of pages to Brooks. Of his composition Street Singer, Rosenthal wrote it is "an authentic hard-bop classic" where "pathos, irony and rage come together in a performance at once anguished and sinister."

== Track listing ==
All compositions by Tina Brooks except those indicated

1. "Back to the Tracks" - 8:03
2. "Street Singer" - 10:21
3. "The Blues and I" - 8:55
4. "For Heaven's Sake" (Elise Bretton, Sherman Edwards, Donald Meyer) - 6:05
5. "The Ruby and The Pearl" (Jay Livingston, Ray Evans) - 5:08

Track 2 recorded on September 1, 1960; the other tracks on October 20, 1960.

== Personnel ==
- Tina Brooks – tenor saxophone
- Jackie McLean – alto saxophone (track 2 only)
- Blue Mitchell – trumpet
- Kenny Drew – piano
- Paul Chambers – bass
- Art Taylor – drums

== See also ==
- Jackie's Bag – the same recording date
