= Born to Be Blue (Freddie Hubbard album) =

Studio album by Freddie Hubbard
- Released: 1982
- Recorded: December 14, 1981
- Genre: Jazz
- Length: 42:00
- Label: Pablo Today
- Producer: Freddie Hubbard

Freddie Hubbard chronology
Keystone Bop: Sunday Night (1982)	Born to Be Blue (1982)	Ride Like the Wind (1982)

Professional ratings
Review scores
Source	Rating
AllMusic	4/5 stars
The Penguin Guide to Jazz Recordings	2/4 stars
The Rolling Stone Jazz Record Guide	3/5 stars

Born to Be Blue is an album by jazz musician Freddie Hubbard recorded in December 1981 and released on the Pablo Today label in 1982.

== Reception ==
The AllMusic review by Scott Yanow calls the album a "fine modern hard bop CD".

== Track listing ==
All compositions by Freddie Hubbard except where noted

1. "Gibraltar" - 12:16
2. "True Colors" - 8:05
3. "Born to Be Blue" (Mel Tormé, Robert Wells) - 7:25
4. "Joy Spring" (Clifford Brown) - 6:48
5. "Up Jumped Spring" - 7:11
- Recorded on Soundstream Digital Systems at Ocean Way Recording Studio, Hollywood; December 14, 1981

== Personnel ==
- Freddie Hubbard - trumpet, flugelhorn
- Harold Land - tenor saxophone, flute
- Billy Childs - keyboards
- Larry Klein - bass
- Steve Houghton - drums
- Buck Clarke - percussion
