= Sweet Return =

Studio album by Freddie Hubbard
- Released: 1983
- Recorded: June 13–14, 1983
- Genre: Jazz
- Label: Atlantic
- Producer: İlhan Mimaroğlu

Freddie Hubbard chronology
Back to Birdland (1983)	Sweet Return (1983)	The Rose Tattoo (1983)

Sweet Return is a studio album by jazz trumpeter Freddie Hubbard, recorded in June 1983 and released on the Atlantic Records label.

== Reception ==
Professional ratings
Review scores
Source	Rating
AllMusic	4/5 stars
The Penguin Guide to Jazz Recordings	3/4 stars
The Rolling Stone Jazz Record Guide	5/5 stars
Windsor Star	B

The AllMusic review by Scott Yanow calls the album "one of Freddie Hubbard's best albums since the early '70's". Similarly, writing shortly after the album's release, both Chuck Berg of the Lawrence Journal-World and Peter Hadekel of the Montreal Gazette commended Hubbard's return to form, with Berg citing the trumpeter's "desire to play 'real' music sans the fads, frills and fancy stuff of pseudo-funk."

== Track listing ==
1. "Sweet Return" (Joan Cartwright) - 9:24
2. "Misty" (Johnny Burke, Erroll Garner) - 5:58
3. "Whistling Away the Dark" (Henry Mancini, Johnny Mercer) - 5:06
4. "Calypso Fred" (Hubbard) 4:13
5. "Heidi-B" (Joanne Brackeen) - 12:54
6. "The Night has a Thousand Eyes" (Buddy Bernier, Jerry Brainin) - 10:21

== Personnel ==
- Freddie Hubbard - trumpet
- Joanne Brackeen - piano
- Lew Tabackin - tenor saxophone, flute
- Eddie Gómez - bass
- Roy Haynes - drums
