= Ready for Freddie =

Studio album by Freddie Hubbard
- Released: Mid April 1962
- Recorded: August 21, 1961
- Studios: Van Gelder, Englewood Cliffs, New Jersey
- Genres: Jazz, hard bop
- Length: 42:33 (original LP)
- Label: Blue Note (BST 84085)
- Producer: Alfred Lion

Freddie Hubbard chronology
| Hub Cap (1961) | Ready for Freddie (1962) | The Artistry of Freddie Hubbard (1962) |

Ready for Freddie is an album by trumpeter Freddie Hubbard, released on the Blue Note label in 1962 as BLP 4085 and BST 84085. In 2003, it was remastered and issued on CD with the addition of two alternate takes. It contains performances by Hubbard, Bernard McKinney, Wayne Shorter, McCoy Tyner, Art Davis and Elvin Jones.

== Reception ==
Professional ratings
Review scores
| Source | Rating |
|---|---|
| AllMusic | 5/5 stars |
| The Penguin Guide to Jazz Recordings | 4/4 stars |
| The Rolling Stone Jazz Record Guide | 5/5 stars |

The album was identified by Scott Yanow in his AllMusic essay "Hard Bop" as one of the 17 Essential Hard Bop Recordings.

== Track listing ==
1. "Arietis" – 6:41
2. "Weaver of Dreams" (Jack Elliott, Victor Young) – 6:35
3. "Marie Antoinette" (Wayne Shorter) – 6:38
4. "Birdlike" – 10:15
5. "Crisis" – 11:33
6. "Arietis" [alternate take] – 5:51
7. "Marie Antoinette" [alternate take] (Shorter) – 6:15

All compositions by Freddie Hubbard except as indicated

== Personnel ==
- Freddie Hubbard – trumpet
- Bernard McKinney – euphonium
- Wayne Shorter – tenor saxophone
- McCoy Tyner – piano
- Art Davis – double bass
- Elvin Jones – drums

== Charts ==
Chart performance for Ready for Freddie
| Chart (2021–2025) | Peak position |
|---|---|
| Belgian Albums (Ultratop Wallonia) | 181 |
| Greek Albums (IFPI) | 74 |
| Scottish Albums (Official Charts) | 74 |
| UK Jazz & Blues Albums (Official Charts) | 4 |
| UK Vinyl Albums (Official Charts) | 40 |
| US Top Album Sales (Billboard) | 72 |
| US Top Contemporary Jazz Albums (Billboard) | 11 |
