= Minor Move =

Studio album by Tina Brooks
- Released: 1980
- Recorded: March 16, 1958
- Studio: Van Gelder Studio, Hackensack, New Jersey
- Genre: Jazz
- Length: 40:38
- Label: Blue Note; GXF 3072 (1980); Blue Note 22671 (2000)
- Producer: Alfred Lion

Tina Brooks chronology
| Minor Move (1980) | True Blue (1960) |

Alternate Album Cover
- Original 1980 LP

Professional ratings
Review scores
| Source | Rating |
|---|---|
| Allmusic | 4.5/5 stars |
| The Penguin Guide to Jazz Recordings | 3.5/4 stars |

Minor Move is an album by American hard bop tenor Tina Brooks. It features performances by Brooks, Lee Morgan, Sonny Clark, Doug Watkins and Art Blakey. It was recorded on March 16, 1958, and was the first album Brooks recorded as a leader for the Blue Note label. The album, however, remained unreleased until being issued in Japan in 1980 (Blue Note GXF 3072). In 2000, Minor Move was released on CD. The composition "Nutville" (not to be confused with the fast-paced Latin composition of the same name by Horace Silver) is sometimes credited to Lee Morgan, but as producer Michael Cuscuna explains in the liner notes to the 2000 release: "Lee brought the tune to the session, but never claimed credit for it. Curtis Fuller also confirms that it was indeed a Tina Brooks original."

== Track listing ==
1. "Nutville" (Brooks) - 8:52
2. "The Way You Look Tonight" (Jerome Kern, Dorothy Fields) - 10:41
3. "Star Eyes" (Gene De Paul, Don Raye)- 8:15
4. "Minor Move" (Brooks) - 6:40
5. "Everything Happens to Me" (Matt Dennis, Tom Adair) - 6:10
6. "Minor Move" [Alternate Take] - 6:53 Bonus track on CD reissue

== Personnel ==
- Tina Brooks - tenor saxophone
- Lee Morgan - trumpet
- Sonny Clark - piano
- Doug Watkins - bass
- Art Blakey - drums
