= The Love Connection =

Studio album by Freddie Hubbard
- Released: 1979
- Recorded: February–March 30, 1979
- Studio: A&M, Los Angeles
- Genre: Jazz
- Length: 43:36
- Label: Columbia
- Producer: Claus Ogerman, Freddie Hubbard

Freddie Hubbard chronology
Super Blue (1978)	The Love Connection (1979)	Skagly (1979)

The Love Connection is a 1979 album by jazz trumpeter Freddie Hubbard, recorded and released by Columbia Records. It contains performances by Tom Scott, Buddy Collette, Chick Corea, Stanley Clarke, and Al Jarreau.

Professional ratings
Review scores
Source	Rating
AllMusic	2/5 stars
The Rolling Stone Jazz Record Guide	1/5 stars
The Virgin Encyclopedia of Jazz	2/5 stars

== Track listing ==
All compositions by Freddie Hubbard except where noted

1. "Love Connection" – 8:17
2. "Brigitte" – 6:57
3. "This Dream" (Claus Ogerman) – 9:00
4. "Little Sunflower" (Hubbard, Jarreau) – 9:20
5. "Lazy Afternoon" (Jerome Moross, John La Touche) – 10:02

== Personnel ==
- Freddie Hubbard − trumpet, flugelhorn
- Oscar Brashear, Snooky Young, Chuck Findley, Steve Madaio − trumpet
- Dick "Slyde" Hyde, Phil Ranelin, Phil Teele − trombone
- Joe Farrell, Tom Scott, Ernie Watts, Buddy Collette − tenor saxophone, flute
- Chick Corea − keyboards
- Chuck Domanico, Stanley Clarke − bass guitar
- Chester Thompson − drums
- Jumma Santos, Rubens Bassini − percussion
- Al Jarreau − vocals
- Claus Ogerman − conductor, arranger
