= The Waiting Game (Tina Brooks album) =

Studio album by Tina Brooks
- Released: October 8, 1999 (Japan); 2002 (US)
- Recorded: March 2, 1961
- Studio: Van Gelder Studio, Englewood Cliffs, NJ
- Genre: Jazz
- Length: 39:44
- Label: Blue Note; Blue Note 40536
- Producer: Alfred Lion

Tina Brooks chronology
Back to the Tracks (1960)	The Waiting Game (1999)

Professional ratings
Review scores
Source	Rating
Allmusic	4/5 stars
The Penguin Guide to Jazz Recordings	3/4 stars
Tom Hull	A−

The Waiting Game is an album recorded by hard-bop tenor saxophonist Tina Brooks, recorded on March 2, 1961 for Blue Note, but not released as a single album until 1999. It features performances by Brooks, Johnny Coles, Kenny Drew, Wilbur Ware and Philly Joe Jones. It was Brooks last recording as leader.

== Track listing ==
All compositions by Tina Brooks except as indicated

1. "Talkin' About" - 7:41
2. "One for Myrtle" - 4:41
3. "Dhyana" - 6:55
4. "David the King" - 6:43
5. "Stranger in Paradise" (Borodin / Wright) - 7:32
6. "The Waiting Game" - 6:12

== Personnel ==
- Tina Brooks - tenor saxophone
- Johnny Coles - trumpet
- Kenny Drew - piano
- Wilbur Ware - bass
- Philly Joe Jones - drums
