= Rollin' (Freddie Hubbard album) =

Live album by Freddie Hubbard
- Released: 1982
- Recorded: May 2, 1981
- Genre: Jazz
- Label: MPS
- Producer: Joachim-Ernst Berendt

Freddie Hubbard chronology
Splash (1981)	Rollin' (1982)	Keystone Bop Vol. 2: Friday & Saturday (1996)

Professional ratings
Review scores
Source	Rating
Allmusic	3/5 stars
The Rolling Stone Jazz Record Guide	2/5 stars

Rollin' is a live album by jazz musician Freddie Hubbard recorded at the Theater Am Ring, Villingen Jazz Festival in Germany's Black Forest and released in 1982 on the MPS label. The album features performances by Hubbard with Dave Schnitter, William Childs, Larry Klein and Carl Burnett.

== Reception ==
The Allmusic review by Scott Yanow states "the largely straightahead music is quite enjoyable and Hubbard's fans may want to search for this fairly rare item".

== Track listing ==
1. "One of Another Kind" - 7:38
2. "Here's That Rainy Day" (Jimmy Van Heusen, Johnny Burke) - 6:23
3. "Cascais" (Larry Klein) - 10:25
4. "Up Jumped Spring" - 6:37
5. "Byrdlike" - 6:38
6. "Brigitte" - 4:35
7. "Breaking Point" - 5:26

All compositions by Freddie Hubbard except as indicated
- Recorded live, May 2, 1981, Theater Am Ring, Villingen Jazz Festival

== Personnel ==
- Freddie Hubbard - trumpet, flugelhorn
- Dave Schnitter - tenor saxophone, soprano saxophone
- William Childs - piano, electric piano
- Larry Klein - bass, bass guitar
- Carl Burnett - drums
