= Goin' Up =

Studio album by Freddie Hubbard
- Released: May 1961
- Recorded: November 6, 1960
- Studio: Van Gelder, Englewood Cliffs
- Genre: Jazz
- Length: 39:26
- Label: Blue Note; BST 84056
- Producer: Alfred Lion

Freddie Hubbard chronology
Open Sesame (1960)	Goin' Up (1961)	Hub Cap (1960)

Goin' Up is an album by trumpeter Freddie Hubbard released on the Blue Note label in 1961. It features performances by Hubbard, Hank Mobley, McCoy Tyner, Paul Chambers and Philly Joe Jones.

== Critical reception ==
Professional ratings
Review scores
Source	Rating
AllMusic	4/5 stars
The Rolling Stone Jazz Record Guide	5/5 stars

Scott Yanow of AllMusic praised Hubbard's "outstanding solos."

== Track listing ==
1. "Asiatic Raes" [also known as "Lotus Blossom"] (Kenny Dorham) - 6:46
2. "The Changing Scene" (Mobley) - 5:49
3. "Karioka" (Dorham) - 6:15
4. "A Peck a Sec" (Mobley) - 5:49
5. "I Wished I Knew" (Bill Smith) - 7:48
6. "Blues for Brenda" (Hubbard) - 6:59

== Personnel ==
- Freddie Hubbard - trumpet
- Hank Mobley - tenor saxophone
- McCoy Tyner - piano
- Paul Chambers - bass
- Philly Joe Jones - drums
