= Open Sesame (Freddie Hubbard album) =

Studio album by Freddie Hubbard
- Released: 1960
- Recorded: June 19, 1960
- Studio: Van Gelder, Englewood Cliffs, New Jersey, U.S.
- Genre: Jazz
- Length: 38:36; 53:27 (CD reissue)
- Label: Blue Note
- Producer: Alfred Lion

Freddie Hubbard chronology
Open Sesame (1960)	Goin' Up (1960)

Open Sesame is the debut album by then-22 years old jazz trumpeter Freddie Hubbard, recorded on June 19, 1960, by Rudy Van Gelder at his studio in Englewood Cliffs, New Jersey, and released on the Blue Note label in 1960 in mono as BLP 4040 and in stereo as BST 84040. It features performances by Hubbard, Tina Brooks, McCoy Tyner, Sam Jones and Clifford Jarvis. In 1988, Capitol Records issued it on compact disc with Michael Cuscuna as reissue producer and in 2001, they released a version remastered by Rudy Van Gelder.

== Critical reception ==
Professional ratings
Review scores
Source	Rating
AllMusic	4.5/5 stars
DownBeat	3.5/5 stars
The Penguin Guide to Jazz	4/4 stars

The Penguin Guide to Jazz included Open Sesame as part of a selected "Core Collection," and has summarized the album as "a great Blue Note set."

DownBeat reviewer John A. Tynan wrote, "There's a youthful virility and aggressiveness in this initial album of young (22) trumpeter Hubbard and cohorts that speaks well for the future of small-group jazz".

== Track listing ==
1. "Open Sesame" (Tina Brooks) - 7:11
2. "But Beautiful" (Johnny Burke, Jimmy Van Heusen) - 6:26
3. "Gypsy Blue" (Brooks) - 6:28
4. "All or Nothing at All" (Arthur Altman, Jack Lawrence) - 5:36
5. "One Mint Julep" (Rudy Toombs) - 6:04
6. "Hub's Nub" (Hubbard) - 6:51
7. "Open Sesame" [alternate take] (Brooks) - 7:16 Bonus track on CD
8. "Gypsy Blue" [alternate take] (Brooks) - 7:35 Bonus track on CD

== Personnel ==
- Freddie Hubbard - trumpet
- Tina Brooks - tenor saxophone
- McCoy Tyner - piano
- Sam Jones - bass
- Clifford Jarvis - drums
