= Here to Stay (Freddie Hubbard album) =

Studio album by Freddie Hubbard
- Released: 1976
- Recorded: December 27, 1962
- Studios: Van Gelder (Englewood Cliffs, New Jersey)
- Genre: Jazz
- Length: 38:20
- Labels: Blue Note; BN-LA 496-2; BST 84135 (announced only)
- Producer: Alfred Lion

Freddie Hubbard chronology
| Hub-Tones (1962) | Here to Stay (1976) | The Body & the Soul (1964) |

Alternative cover
- CD reissue (BST 84135)

Here to Stay is a studio album by American jazz trumpeter Freddie Hubbard, recorded on December 27, 1962, but not released on the Blue Note label until 1976 as BN-LA 496-2. It features performances by Hubbard, Cedar Walton, Reggie Workman, Philly Joe Jones, and Wayne Shorter.

== Reception ==
Professional ratings
Review scores
| Source | Rating |
|---|---|
| All About Jazz | 4.5/5 stars |
| AllMusic | 4/5 stars |
| The Penguin Guide to Jazz Recordings | 3.5/4 stars |
| The Virgin Encyclopedia of Jazz | 3/5 stars |

Norman Weinstein of All About Jazz commented "Another indication of Hubbard's well-seasoned taste on this session is revealed in using two of Cal Massey's most memorable compositions, "Father and Son" and "Assunta." Listen to the solos by Hubbard and Shorter on "Assunta" and ask yourself if they haven't slipped to a new phase of their growth, apart from Blakey's band at this juncture, that's more darkly introspective. I hope the album title is true of the recording's fate". Speaking of the original double-LP release, Scott Yanow of AllMusic stated that, although the Hub Cap album is "excellent", "it is the full album of previously unreleased material from an all-star quintet that is of greatest interest".

== Track listing ==
All compositions by Freddie Hubbard, except where indicated.

1. "Philly Mignon" - 5:30
2. "Father and Son" (Cal Massey) - 6:37
3. "Body and Soul" (Johnny Green, Robert Sour, Edward Heyman, Frank Eyton) - 6:29
4. "Nostrand and Fulton" - 7:09
5. "Full Moon and Empty Arms" (Buddy Kaye, Ted Mossman) - 5:28
6. "Assunta" (Massey) - 7:07

== Personnel ==
- Freddie Hubbard - trumpet
- Wayne Shorter - tenor saxophone
- Cedar Walton - piano
- Reggie Workman - bass
- Philly Joe Jones - drums

== Charts ==
| Chart (2025) | Peak position |
|---|---|
| Greek Albums (IFPI) | 77 |
| UK Jazz & Blues Albums (Official Charts) | 17 |
| US Top Jazz Albums (Billboard) | 22 |
