= David Sanborn (album) =

Sanborn

Studio album by David Sanborn
- Released: 1976
- Studio: A&R Recording (New York City, New York)
- Genre: Smooth jazz
- Length: 39:53
- Label: Warner Bros.
- Producer: Phil Ramone

David Sanborn chronology
Beck & Sanborn (1975)	Sanborn (1976)	Promise Me the Moon (1977)

Sanborn is an album by jazz saxophonist David Sanborn, released by Warner Bros. in 1976. It contains a version of "I Do It for Your Love" by Paul Simon.

== Track listing ==
1. "Indio" (Rosalinda de Leon) - 5:35
2. "Smile" (Paul Simon, Coleridge-Taylor Perkinson) - 5:24
3. "Mamacita" (de Leon) - 4:45
4. "Herbs" (Herb Bushler) - 4:29
5. "Concrete Boogie" (Hiram Bullock) - 6:42
6. "I Do It for Your Love" (Simon) - 2:47
7. "Sophisticated Squaw" (Victor Lewis) - 4:47
8. "7th Ave." (Lewis) - 5:34

== Personnel ==
- David Sanborn – alto saxophone, soprano saxophone, flute
- Rosalinda de Leon – keyboards
- Richard Tee – keyboards on "I Do It for Your Love"
- Hiram Bullock – guitar, vocals
- Herb Bushler – bass guitar
- Victor Lewis – drums
- Juma Santos – percussion
- Paul Simon – vocals on "Smile"
- Phoebe Snow – vocals on "Smile"
- Patti Austin – backing vocals
- Lani Groves – backing vocals

Production

- John Court – executive producer
- Phil Ramone – producer, recording engineer
- Vicki Fabry – recording assistant
- Theresa Del Pozzo – production coordinator
- Sam Shaw – photography, design
