= Minor Mishap =

Studio album by Freddie Hubbard
- Released: 1989
- Recorded: August 2, 1961
- Studio: Bell Sound (New York City)
- Genre: Jazz
- Length: 1:07:11
- Label: Black Lion BLP 60122
- Producer: Alan Bates

Freddie Hubbard chronology
Feel the Wind (1988)	Minor Mishap (1989)	Times Are Changing (1989)

Professional ratings
Review scores
Source	Rating
Allmusic	4/5 stars

Minor Mishap is a studio album featuring American jazz trumpeter Freddie Hubbard recorded in August 1961. The session was led by trombonist Willie Wilson, who died shortly after the recording date. The album is the only known recording made by Wilson. The album was first released in 1966 exclusively in the Netherlands and in United Kingdom as Groovy! under the Fontana label, and then re-released by Prestige Records in 1970 under Duke Pearson's name as Dedication! and appears on CD without alternate takes by that title as well.

== Reception ==
Scott Yanow of Allmusic wrote a positive review, stating "This is one of Freddie Hubbard's more obscure sessions of the 1960s. Actually, it was originally led by the forgotten trombonist Willie Wilson (who died in 1963). The 23-year-old trumpeter is teamed with Wilson, baritonist Pepper Adams, and the Duke Pearson Trio (with bassist Thomas Howard and drummer Lex Humphries) for originals by Wilson, Pearson, Adams, Donald Byrd, and Tommy Flanagan in addition to two standards that feature the trombonist. This is an excellent hard bop date and well worth picking up by straight-ahead jazz fans."

== Track listing ==
No.	Title	Writer(s)	Length
1.	"Minor Mishap (Take 3)"	Tommy Flanagan	4:25
2.	"Minor Mishap (Take 4)"	Tommy Flanagan	4:23
3.	"Blues for Alvena (Take 3)"	Wilson	9:27
4.	"Blues for Alvena (Take 4)"	Wilson	7:11
5.	"The Nearness of You"	Hoagy Carmichael, Ned Washington	5:02
6.	"Number Five (Take 3)"	Pearson	3:26
7.	"Number Five (Take 5)"	Pearson	3:47
8.	"Lex (Take 2)"	Donald Byrd	5:56
9.	"Lex (Take 4)"	Donald Byrd	5:48
10.	"Time After Time"	Sammy Cahn, Jule Styne	6:45
11.	"Apothegm (Take 6)"	Adams	5:25
12.	"Apothegm (Take 14)"	Adams	5:36
Total length:			01:07:11

== Personnel ==
Band

- Pepper Adams – Baritone saxophone
- Thomas Howard – bass
- Freddie Hubbard – horn, trumpet
- Lex Humphries – drums
- Duke Pearson – piano
- Willie Wilson – trombone - ballad features tracks 5 and 10

Production

- Alun Morgan – liner notes
- Fred Norsworthy – engineer
- David Redfern – photography
- Malcolm Walker – design
