= Trouble Man (album) =

Soundtrack album by Marvin Gaye
- Released: December 8, 1972
- Recorded: 1972
- Studio: Hitsville West (Los Angeles)
- Genres: Jazz-funk, soul
- Length: 38:25
- Label: Tamla
- Producer: Marvin Gaye

Marvin Gaye chronology
What's Going On (1971)	Trouble Man (1972)	Let's Get It On (1973)

Singles from Trouble Man
- 1. "Trouble Man" Released: November 21, 1972

Trouble Man is the first soundtrack album released by American soul singer Marvin Gaye, on December 8, 1972, on Motown-subsidiary label Tamla Records. As the soundtrack to the 1972 blaxploitation film of the same name, the Trouble Man soundtrack was a more contemporary move for Gaye, following his politically charged album What's Going On. This was the first album to be written and produced solely by Gaye. The only other album recorded under his full creative control was In Our Lifetime, released in 1981.

== Recording ==
Following the success of What's Going On (1971), Marvin Gaye had not only won creative control, but a renewed $1 million contract with Motown Records subsidiary Tamla had made the musician the most profitable R&B artist in the world.

Signing the contract in early 1972, Gaye sought to take advantage of his opportunities. Bolstered by the successes of film soundtracks such as Shaft and Superfly, Motown offered the musician a chance to compose his own film soundtrack after winning rights to produce the crime thriller, Trouble Man.

Unlike Isaac Hayes and Curtis Mayfield, who mixed social commentary with sexual songs in their respective soundtracks, Gaye chose to focus primarily on the film's character, "Mister T", producing and composing the film's score while entirely producing the film's soundtrack, which was recorded at Motown Studios (or "Hitsville West") in Hollywood.

Following the closing of Detroit's Hitsville USA studios in 1972, Motown had primarily moved its location to Los Angeles, where Gaye also relocated while he recorded the Trouble Man album. Gaye invited several musicians, including some from the Funk Brothers and musicians from Hamilton Bohannon's band.

Gaye would compose five different versions of the title track, including an alternate vocal version, which was used primarily for the film's intro. The alternate version featured Gaye double-tracking two lead vocal parts into one, overlaying his falsetto vocals with his lower register. The single version, which was also featured on the soundtrack, would feature a single lead vocal take. The other three versions were put on the album as instrumentals with Gaye providing synthesizer keyboards while saxophone solos (and occasionally guitar) accompany him.

The only other songs in which Gaye vocalized harmonies or performed lead vocals included "Poor Abbey Walsh", "Cleo's Apartment", "Life is a Gamble", "Don't Mess with Mister T" and "There Goes Mister T".

== Critical reception ==
Professional ratings
Review scores
Source	Rating
AllMusic	4/5 stars
Christgau's Record Guide	C
Tom Hull	B
Rolling Stone	(mixed)

Bolstered by the hit success of the title track, which returned Gaye to a blues format reaching number 4 on the Soul Chart and number 7 on the Pop Charts, respectively, the album followed in December where it reached the top 20 of the Billboard 200, peaking at number 12. On Cashbox and Record World Magazines Charts the album even reached the Top 5, peaking almost as high as its monumental predecessor What‘s Going On, eighteen months earlier, eventually being rewarded with a gold disc at Motown Records.

It would become Gaye's only soundtrack and film score. Critics gave the album favorable reviews while sometimes comparing Gaye's soundtrack efforts to that of Hayes' and Mayfield's. Following this, other R&B musicians would produce soundtracks of their own, including James Brown, Barry White and fellow Motown acts, Willie Hutch and Edwin Starr.

== In popular culture ==
The title track plays in the 1995 film Se7en while Morgan Freeman's character, Detective Somerset, is having dinner with Brad Pitt's character, Detective Mills, and his wife Tracy Mills, played by Gwyneth Paltrow.

The title track features during the opening credits and final scene of the 2005 film Four Brothers.

In the 2014 film Captain America: The Winter Soldier, Sam Wilson recommends the album as essential listening to Steve Rogers, who had until recently been frozen in ice since the Second World War: Wilson says it's "everything you missed, jammed into one album". Towards the end of the film, the album's title track is playing on an iPhone.

In the episode "Power Broker" of the 2021 Disney+ series The Falcon and the Winter Soldier, Wilson notices that Bucky Barnes has the same pocket notebook and mentions that he had recommended the album to Rogers. When Barnes does not seem to share the same level of enthusiasm for the album, Baron Helmut Zemo enthuses flamboyantly about the album, telling Barnes that it is "...a masterpiece. Complete. Comprehensive. It captures the African-American experience", much to Wilson's amazement. The episode aired on Marvin Gaye's birthday.

== Track listing ==
All songs written by Marvin Gaye.

=== Original LP ===
Side One

1. "Main Theme from Trouble Man (2)" – 2:30
2. "'T' Plays It Cool" – 4:27
3. "Poor Abbey Walsh" – 4:13
4. "The Break In (Police Shoot Big)" – 1:57
5. "Cleo's Apartment" – 2:10
6. "Trouble Man" – 3:49
7. "Theme from Trouble Man" – 2:01

Side Two

1. "'T' Stands for Trouble" – 4:48
2. "Main Theme from Trouble Man (1)" – 3:52
3. "Life Is a Gamble" – 2:32
4. "Deep-in-It" – 1:25
5. "Don't Mess with Mister 'T'" – 3:04
6. "There Goes Mister 'T'" – 1:37

=== 2012 Reissue ===
Disc one (bonus tracks)

1. Main Theme from Trouble Man (2) (Alternate Take With Strings)
2. "T" Plays It Cool (Unedited)
3. Poor Abbey Walsh, Part 2 (Take 1)
4. Poor Abbey Walsh, Part 2 (Take 2)
5. Trouble Man (Extended Version)
6. Theme from Trouble Man (Vocal Version)
7. "T" Stands for Trouble (Unedited Vocal Version)
8. "T" Stands for Trouble (Alternate Version)
9. Main Theme from Trouble Man (Vocal Version)

Disc two (Original Film Score)

1. Trouble Man
2. Poor Hall
3. "T" Plays It Cool
4. Cadillac Interlude / Cleo's Apartment
5. Man Tied Up / Jimmy's West / Conversation with Cleo
6. Crap Game (A.K.A. The Break In) / Getting Rid of Body / Talking to Angel
7. Outside Police Station
8. Bowling Alley / Parking Lot
9. Stick Up
10. Cleaners / Cleo
11. Closing Jimmy's
12. Police Break In
13. "T" Cleans Up / Police Station
14. Packing Up / Jimmy Gets Worked / Saying Goodbye / "T" Breaks In / Movie Theater
15. Car Ride / Looking for Pete
16. Parking Garage / Elevator
17. Penthouse
18. Getting Pete
19. My Name Is "T" / End Credits
20. "T" at the Cross (film band bonus)

== Personnel ==
=== Musicians ===
- Marvin Gaye – vocals, drums, keyboards, piano, synthesizers, producer, arranger (9)
- James Jamerson – bass
- Trevor Lawrence – alto, tenor and baritone saxophones
- Dale Oehler – horn & rhythm arrangements (track 9)
- Eli Fountain – alto saxophone
- Marty Montgomery – soprano saxophone
- Gene Page – strings (track 9)
- Robert O. Ragland – piano, string arrangements (track 7)
- James Anthony Carmichael – horn arrangements (track 7)
- Nesbert Stix Hooper – drums
- Leon "Ndugu" Chancler – drums
- Ray Parker Jr. – guitar
- David T. Walker – guitar

=== Production ===
- Dale Oehler – arranger (tracks 1, 6)
- Gene Page – arranger (9)
- Jack Hayes – arranger (3, 10–13)
- J.J. Johnson – arranger (8)
- Robert O. Ragland – arranger (4–5)
- Leo Shuken – arranger (3, 10–13)
- Jerry Long – arranger (2)
