= Bolivia (Walton song) =

Jazz standard by Cedar Walton

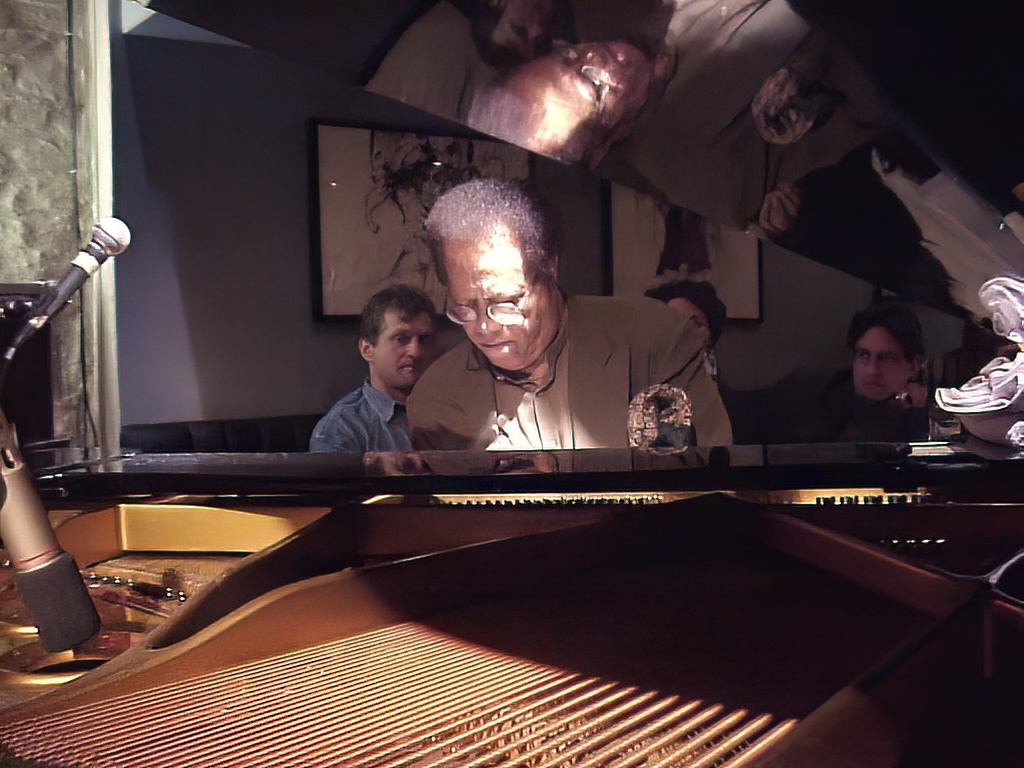
Picture of Cedar Walton in 2001, the composer of Bolivia.

"Bolivia" is a jazz standard written by American jazz pianist Cedar Walton. It is regarded as his best-known composition.

== Background ==
Bolivia was first recorded on Eastern Rebellion's self-titled album released in 1976 with Cedar Walton on piano, George Coleman on tenor saxophone, Sam Jones on bass, and Billy Higgins on drums.

== Musical composition ==
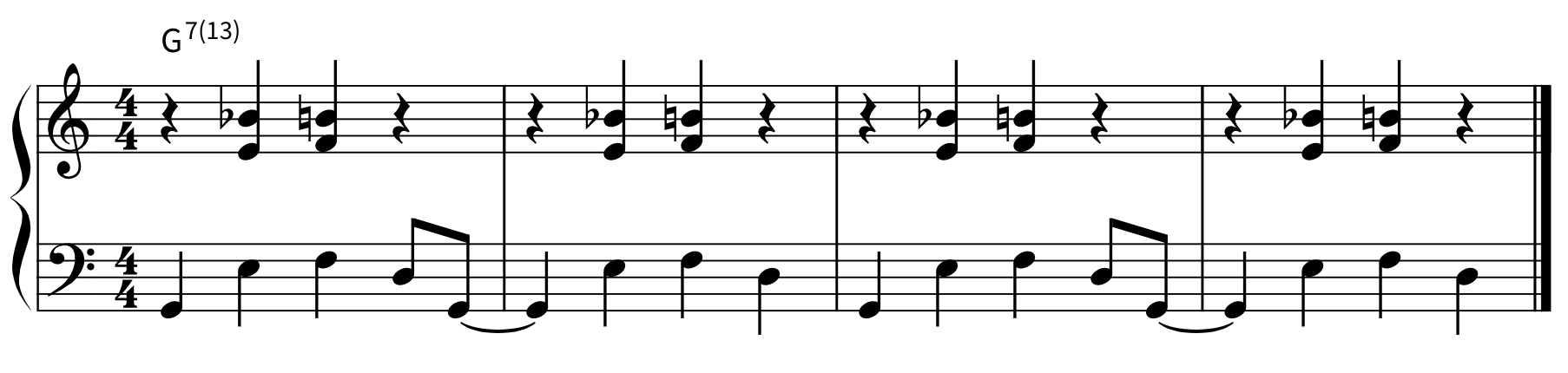
First four bars of Bolivia by Cedar Walton.

First four bars of Cedar Walton's Bolivia

Bolivia is composed in G major and typically played in an Afro-Cuban style.

The song contains a bass ostinato that is repeated throughout the first 16 bars of the song. The first 16 bars are entirely based upon a G7(13) chord.

The B section—or the final 16 bars—contains the following form. After the B-section, the song repeats with the same bass ostinato.

B Section
E♭Δ7	A13(7)	DΔ7	A♭7
GΔ7	F♯7 (♯9)	B-7	C7 (♯11)
B-7	B-7/A	A♭-7♭5	G-7 C7
FΔ7	B7	B♭Δ7	A7

== Notable recordings ==
- Eastern Rebellion in Eastern Rebellion (1976)
- Sam Jones in Something in Common (1978)
- Doug Raney Quintet in I'll Close My Eyes (1982)
- Freddie Hubbard in Bolivia (1991)
- Cody Moffett in Evidence (1993)
- John Carlini in Further Adventures (2007)
- Sean Dobbins and the Modern Jazz Messengers in Blue Horizons (2008)
