= Bolivia (Freddie Hubbard album) =

Studio album by Freddie Hubbard
- Released: 1991
- Recorded: December 13, 1990–January 14, 1991
- Genre: Jazz
- Label: MusicMasters; 65073-2

Freddie Hubbard chronology
Topsy - Standard Book (1989)	Bolivia (1991)	At Jazz Jamboree Warszawa '91: A Tribute to Miles (2000)

Bolivia is an album by the American trumpeter Freddie Hubbard, released on the Music Master label in 1991. It features performances by Hubbard, Ralph Moore, Vincent Herring, Cedar Walton, David Williams, and Billy Higgins.

== Recording Sessions ==
Bolivia was recorded with the then-current members of the Eastern Rebellion jazz quartet (Moore, Walton, Williams and Higgins), plus Vincent Herring and Hubbard. Three of the six songs were recorded during the same December 1990 recording sessions that produced Eastern Rebellion's Mosaic album, and the rest were recorded the next month. Bolivia was the first of three hard bop albums that Hubbard recorded for the MusicMasters record label in the 1990s.

== Reception ==
Professional ratings
Review scores
Source	Rating
AllMusic	3/5 stars
Los Angeles Times	3.5/4 stars

The Los Angeles Times wrote that the title track "sashays back and forth between a undulating Latin feeling and a driving swing section."

The AllMusic review by Scott Yanow states that "overall the music is satisfying enough to make this a recommended disc to fans of the modern mainstream."

== Track listing ==
All compositions by Freddie Hubbard except as indicated

1. "Homegrown" – 8:41
2. "Bolivia" (Walton) – 6:54
3. "God Bless the Child" (Arthur Herzog Jr., Billie Holiday) – 6:31
4. "Dear John" – 7:30
5. "Managua" – 10:00
6. "Third World" – 8:11

== Personnel ==
- Freddie Hubbard – trumpet
- Vincent Herring – alto saxophone
- Ralph Moore – tenor saxophone
- Cedar Walton – piano
- David Williams – bass
- Billy Higgins – drums
