= Live at the North Sea Jazz Festival, 1980 (Freddie Hubbard album) =

Live at the North Sea Jazz Festival

Live album by Freddie Hubbard
- Released: 1980
- Recorded: July 12, 1980
- Venue: The Hague
- Genre: Jazz
- Length: 73:36
- Label: Pablo

Freddie Hubbard chronology
Skagly (1979)	Live at the North Sea Jazz Festival (1980)	Mistral (1980)

Professional ratings
Review scores
Source	Rating
Allmusic	4/5 stars
The Rolling Stone Jazz Record Guide	2/5 stars

Live at the North Sea Jazz Festival is a live album by jazz musician Freddie Hubbard released on the Pablo label which features performances by Hubbard, David Schnitter, Billy Childs, Larry Klein and Sinclair Lott recorded at the North Sea Jazz Festival, The Hague, the Netherlands on July 12, 1980.

== Track listing ==
1. "First Light" - 16:32
2. "One of Another Kind" - 12:47
3. "One of a Kind" - 10:30
4. "Impressions" (Coltrane) - 11:52
5. "Happiness Is Now" - 12:21
6. "Red Clay" - 9:34

All compositions by Freddie Hubbard except as indicated
- Recorded live at the North Sea Jazz Festival, The Hague, Netherlands, on July 12, 1980.

== Personnel ==
- Freddie Hubbard: trumpet
- David Schnitter: tenor saxophone, flute
- Billy Childs: keyboards
- Larry Klein: bass
- Sinclair Lott: drums
