= New Jersey to Woodstock =

Compilation album by Kathy McCord
- Released: February 22, 2010
- Recorded: November 18–20 & 24, 1969; December 2, 1969; Van Gelder Studio, Englewood Cliffs; 1968; 1972–1979
- Genre: Folk music, rock, soul, pop
- Length: 1:47:35; CD1: 47:20; CD2: 1:00:31
- Label: Big Beat Records; CDWIK2 289

Kathy McCord chronology
Baby Come Out Tonight (1979)	New Jersey to Woodstock (2010)

New Jersey to Woodstock is a compilation album by American singer Kathy McCord, released in 2010. It contains the album Kathy McCord released on CTI Records in 1970, the single "I'll Give My Heart To You"/"I'll Never Be Alone Again" released on Rainy Day Records in 1968, as well as 16 previously unreleased songs, recorded by the artist in 1972–1979. The album was reproduced under the label Big Beat Records. McCord's signature mix of soul, folk rock, and psychedelic rock is on full display in this compilation.

The compilation’s second disc includes songs recorded in the 1970s with members of The Band (Levon Helm, Rick Danko), Paul Butterfield, and Amos Garrett, showcasing McCord’s Woodstock-era connections.

Professional ratings
Review scores
Source	Rating
Allmusic	4/5 stars

== Track listing ==
All tracks are written by Kathleen McCord, unless otherwise noted.

CD 1: New Jersey, The 60s Recordings
No.	Title	Length
1.	"Rainbow Ride"	5:09
2.	"I'm Leaving Home" (John Lennon, Paul McCartney)	4:24
3.	"Candle Waxing"	4:16
4.	"Baby James"	3:18
5.	"The Love Flow"	3:05
6.	"New York Good Sugar/Love Lyric #7"	4:01
7.	"For You, Child"	3:12
8.	"Jennipher"	4:43
9.	"Take Away This Pain"	5:42
10.	"Velvet Smile" (Kathleen McCord, Billy Vera)	3:20
11.	"I'll Give My Heart To You" (Chip Taylor)	3:49
12.	"I'll Never Be Alone Again" (Chip Taylor, Al Gorgoni)	2:29

CD 2: Woodstock, The 70s Recordings
No.	Title	Length
1.	"New Horizons"	3:29
2.	"Acapulco"	3:11
3.	"Baby, Come Out Tonight"	2:58
4.	"That's A Love That's Real"	3:58
5.	"No Need To Wait"	3:16
6.	"I'll Be Lovin' You Forever"	3:24
7.	"Magnolia"	3:10
8.	"Madman"	3:57
9.	"Captain Cody Memorial"	3:57
10.	"Keep Peace In The Family"	3:43
11.	"You'd Convince The Devil"	2:45
12.	"Who's Been Coolin' You?"	6:00
13.	"Don't Go Talkin' To Strangers"	4:06
14.	"Every Little Thing You Do"	3:58
15.	"I Wanna Know Why"	4:40
16.	"Shine On"	3:59

== Personnel ==
=== CD 1 (tracks 1–10) ===
- Kathy McCord – vocals
- Hubert Laws – flute
- Paul Harris – piano, organ
- John Hall – guitar
- Harvey Brooks – bass
- Willis Kelly – drums
- Ed Shaughnessy – drums, tabla
- Don Sebesky – string and brass arrangements

== Release history ==
List of release dates, showing country, record label, and format
Region	Date	Label	Format
UK	February 22, 2010	Ace Records	2xCD, DL
Germany	March 5, 2010	Ace Records	2xCD, DL
USA	March 10, 2010	Ace Records	2xCD, DL
Japan	March 25, 2010	Ace Records	2xCD, DL
