= Jackie's Bag =

Studio album by Jackie McLean
- Released: June 1961
- Recorded: January 18, 1959–September 1, 1960
- Studio: Van Gelder, Hackensack, New Jersey; Van Gelder, Englewood Cliffs, NJ
- Genre: Jazz
- Length: 38:50 LP; 62:47CD
- Label: Blue Note
- Producer: Alfred Lion

Jackie McLean chronology
Capuchin Swing (1960)	Jackie's Bag (1961)	Bluesnik (1962)

Jackie's Bag is an album by American saxophonist Jackie McLean, recorded in 1959 and 1960 and released by Blue Note. It features three tracks with McLean in a quintet featuring trumpeter Donald Byrd, pianist Sonny Clark, bassist Paul Chambers and drummer Philly Joe Jones, and six tracks with a sextet featuring tenor saxophonist Tina Brooks, trumpeter Blue Mitchell, pianist Kenny Drew, bassist Paul Chambers and drummer Art Taylor.

== Reception ==
The contemporaneous DownBeat reviewer stated, "All the participants play well, and the thematic content, all McLean's work, is interesting", but added that he preferred McLean's earlier, more intense playing. The AllMusic review by Steve Huey stated that "the music on Jackie's Bag finds McLean in a staunchly hard bop mode, with occasional hints of adventurousness".

Professional ratings
Review scores
Source	Rating
AllMusic	4.5/5 stars
DownBeat	3/5 stars
The Penguin Guide to Jazz Recordings	3/4 stars

== Track listing ==
All compositions by Jackie McLean, except as indicated.

1. "Quadrangle" – 4:44
2. "Blues Inn" – 9:06
3. "Fidel" – 7:11
4. "Appointment in Ghana" – 6:59
5. "A Ballad for Doll" – 3:19
6. "Isle of Java" (Tina Brooks) – 7:31

Bonus tracks on CD reissue:

7. "Street Singer" (Brooks) – 10:19
8. "Melonae's Dance" – 6:50
9. "Medina" (Brooks) – 6:48

Recorded on January 18, 1959 (tracks 1–3), and September 1, 1960 (tracks 4–9).

== Personnel ==
Tracks 1–3

- Jackie McLean – alto saxophone
- Donald Byrd – trumpet
- Sonny Clark – piano (#2–3)
- Paul Chambers – bass
- Philly Joe Jones – drums

Tracks 4–9

- Jackie McLean – alto saxophone
- Tina Brooks – tenor saxophone
- Blue Mitchell – trumpet
- Kenny Drew – piano
- Paul Chambers – bass
- Art Taylor – drums

== See also ==
- Back to the Tracks – the same recording date
