= True Blue (Tina Brooks album) =

Studio album by Tina Brooks
- Released: December 1960
- Recorded: June 25, 1960
- Studio: Van Gelder Studio, Englewood Cliffs, NJ
- Genre: Jazz
- Length: 37:39 original LP; 50:20 CD reissue
- Label: Blue Note; BST 84041
- Producer: Alfred Lion

Tina Brooks chronology
Minor Move (1958)	True Blue (1960)	Back to the Tracks (1960)

True Blue is a jazz album by tenor saxophonist Tina Brooks recorded on June 25, 1960, and released on the Blue Note label. In the hard-bop idiom, it was Brooks' only performance as leader to be released during his lifetime, and features performances by Brooks, Freddie Hubbard, Duke Jordan, Sam Jones, and Art Taylor.

== Reception ==
Professional ratings
Review scores
Source	Rating
Allmusic	4.5/5 stars
The Penguin Guide to Jazz Recordings	3.5/4 stars
DownBeat	2.5/5 stars

Scott Yanow of Allmusic states: "the hard bop solos are consistently excellent" on True Blue.

== Track listing ==
All compositions by Tina Brooks except those indicated.

1. "Good Old Soul" - 8:07
2. "Up Tight's Creek" - 5:17
3. "Theme for Doris" - 5:53
4. "True Blue" - 4:57
5. "Miss Hazel" - 5:32
6. "Nothing Ever Changes My Love for You" (Jack Segal, Marvin Fisher) - 7:53

Bonus tracks on CD reissue:

7. "True Blue" (Alternate Take) - 5:06
8. "Good Old Soul" (Alternate Take) - 7:35

== Personnel ==
- Tina Brooks - tenor saxophone
- Freddie Hubbard - trumpet
- Duke Jordan - piano
- Sam Jones - bass
- Art Taylor - drums
