= Super Blue =

Studio album by Freddie Hubbard
- Released: 1978
- Recorded: March 30–31, April 1 & 4, 1978
- Studios: CBS (New York City); A&M (Hollywood)
- Genre: Jazz
- Label: Columbia
- Producer: Dale Oehler

Freddie Hubbard chronology
Bundle of Joy (1976)	Super Blue (1978)	The Love Connection (1979)

Super Blue is a 1978 album by jazz musician Freddie Hubbard. It was released on the Columbia label and peaked at No. 6 on the Billboard Charts. The album features performances by Hubbard, Hubert Laws, Joe Henderson and Kenny Barron with George Benson guesting on one track. In 2007 the album was rereleased on the Mosaic Contemporary label with three alternate takes.

== Critical reception ==
Professional ratings
Review scores
Source	Rating
AllMusic	3/5 stars

The Bay State Banner wrote that "Freddie now has returned to basic jazz playing none of the easy top 40 material that characterized most of his Columbia career... There are no inane funk cliches or three minute tunes."

== Track listing ==
1. "Super Blue" (Benard Ighner) - 7:50
2. "To Her Ladyship" (Bill Frazier) - 6:01
3. "Take It to the Ozone" - 7:01
4. "The Gospel Truth" - 4:59
5. "The Surest Things Can Change" (Gino Vannelli) - 6:20
6. "Theme for Kareem" - 6:07
7. "Super Blue" [alternate take] (Ira Ingher) - 10:36 Bonus track on 2007 CD reissue
8. "Take It to the Ozone" [alternate take] - 6:56 Bonus track on 2007 CD reissue
9. "Theme for Kareem" [alternate take] - 6:44 Bonus track on 2007 CD reissue

All compositions by Freddie Hubbard except as indicated
- Recorded at CBS Recording Studios, New York, on March 30, 31 & April 1, 4, 1978, by Don Puluse, mixed at A&M Studios, Hollywood

== Personnel ==
- Freddie Hubbard - trumpet and flugelhorn
- Hubert Laws - flutes
- Joe Henderson - tenor sax
- Ron Carter - bass
- Jack DeJohnette - drums
- Kenny Barron - keyboards
- George Benson - guitar (track 2)
- Dale Oehler - keyboards (track 1)

== Charts ==
Weekly chart performance for Super Blue
Chart (1978)	Peak position
US Billboard 200	131
