= Bolívia (footballer) =

Brazilian footballer (born 1986)

Anderson Cardoso
Personal information
- Full name: Anderson Rodrigues Cardoso
- Date of birth: 10 February 1986 (age 40)
- Place of birth: Porto Alegre, Brazil
- Height: 1.73 m (5 ft 8 in)
- Position: Striker

Youth career
- –2006: Internacional

Senior career*
Years	Team	Apps	(Gls)
2006	Internacional		
2007	Esportivo-RS		
2008	Novo Hamburgo-RS		
2009	AD São Caetano (SP)	1	(0)
2009	Clube Atlético Bragantino (SP)	1	(0)
2010–2013	Esporte Clube Taubaté (SP)		
2013	→Bangu Atlético Clube (loan)	0	(0)
- * Club domestic league appearances and goals as of 3:38, November 04, 2013 (UTC)

Anderson Rodrigues Cardoso also known as Bolívia (born 10 February 1986) is a Brazilian football striker.

== Club career ==
=== Brazil ===
Bolívia played his youth career in Internacional, at one time a teammate of a young Alexandre Pato. Later he played for several clubs in Brazil, his last club being EC Taubate.

=== Perak FA ===
In November 2013, after signing Burkina Faso player Martin Kafando, Bolívia was given a trial spot with Malaysia Super League team Perak FA to fill its foreign player quota. Initially Cardoso was given a permanent position after scoring two goals in friendly matches against both Malacca FA and Super Star FC, but after his registration as a foreign player he was rejected by FA Malaysia as he never played in a 1st Division league of any country, Perak chose not to retain him in the squad.
