= Kathy McCord (album) =

Studio album by Kathy McCord
- Released: March 1970
- Recorded: November 18–20 & 24, 1969; December 2, 1969
- Studio: Van Gelder Studio, Englewood Cliffs, NJ
- Genre: Folk music
- Length: 41:10
- Label: CTI; CTI 1001
- Producer: Creed Taylor

Kathy McCord chronology
Kathy McCord (1970)	Baby Come Out Tonight (1979)

Singles from Kathy McCord
- 1. "Take Away This Pain" Released: 1970 (USA); 2. "New York Good Sugar/Love Lyric #7" Released: 1971 (Spain)

Kathy McCord is the debut album by American singer Kathy McCord, released in 1970, the first album issued on Creed Taylor's CTI Records. The album has been re-issued on CD twice: in 1999 in Japan as Rainbow Ride and in 2011 in South Korea as Kathy McCord, both CD reissues were released without the artist's approval. However, in 2010 the whole album was included on compilation New Jersey to Woodstock, collecting 1968's single "I'll Give My Heart To You"/"I'll Never Be Alone Again" and some of her 1970s recordings.

== Track listing ==
All tracks are written by Kathy McCord, unless otherwise noted.

No.	Title	Length
1.	"Rainbow Ride"	5:09
2.	"I'm Leaving Home" (Lennon, McCartney)	4:24
3.	"Candle Waxing"	4:16
4.	"Baby James"	3:18
5.	"The Love Flow"	3:05
6.	"New York Good Sugar/Love Lyric #7"	4:01
7.	"For You, Child"	3:12
8.	"Jennipher"	4:43
9.	"Take Away This Pain"	5:42
10.	"Velvet Smile"	3:20

== Personnel ==
- Kathy McCord – vocals
- Hubert Laws – flute
- Paul Harris – piano, organ
- John Hall – guitar
- Harvey Brooks – bass
- Willis Kelly – drums
- Ed Shaughnessy – drums, tabla
- Don Sebesky – string and brass arrangements

== Release history ==
List of release dates, showing country, record label, and format
Region	Date	Label	Catalog Number	Format
Original issues
USA	March 1970	CTI Records	CTI 1001	LP
Spain	1971	CTI Records	TCS 4004	LP
Japan	1971	CTI Records	SR-3302	LP
Re-issues
Japan	August 15, 1999	Vivid Sound	VSCD 728	CD
South Korea	June 24, 2011	Media Arte	MI0042	CD
