= Freddie Hubbard =

American jazz trumpeter (1938–2008)

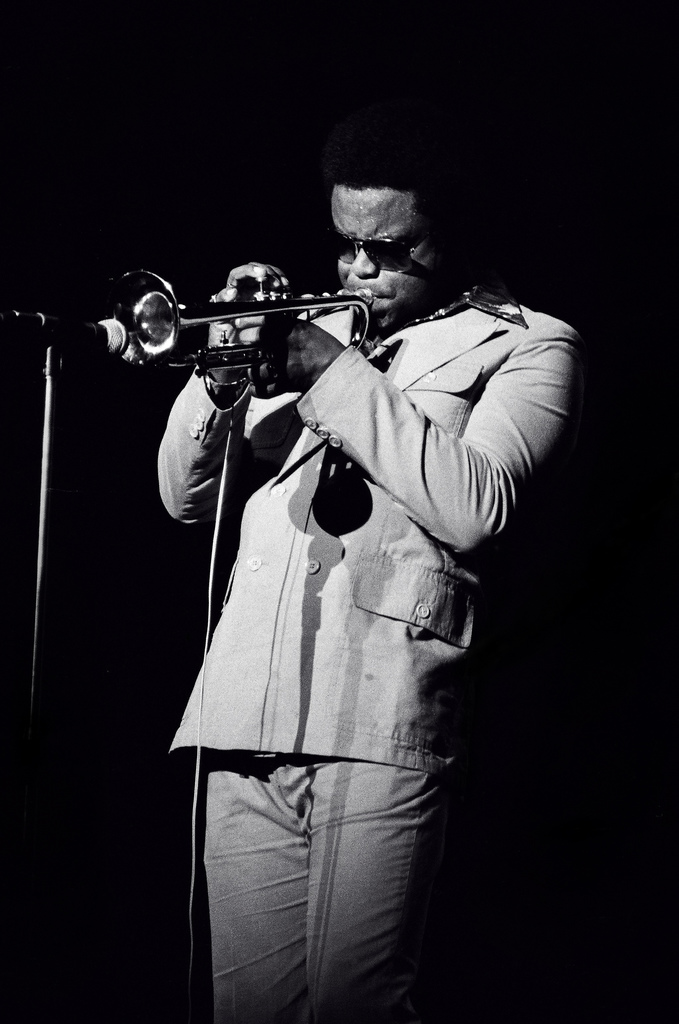
- Hubbard in 1976

Background information
- Born: Frederick Dewayne Hubbard; April 7, 1938; Indianapolis, Indiana, U.S.
- Died: December 29, 2008 (aged 70) Los Angeles, California, U.S.
- Genres: Jazz; hard bop; post-bop; neo-bop; jazz fusion
- Occupations: Musician; bandleader; composer
- Instruments: Trumpet; flugelhorn; cornet; French horn; mellophone
- Years active: 1958–2008
- Labels: Atlantic; Columbia; CTI; Blue Note
- Website: freddiehubbardmusic.com

Frederick Dewayne Hubbard (April 7, 1938 – December 29, 2008) was an American jazz trumpeter. He played bebop, hard bop, and post-bop styles from the early 1960s onwards. His unmistakable and influential tone contributed to new perspectives for modern jazz and bebop.

== Career beginnings ==
Hubbard attended Arsenal Technical High School in Indianapolis, Indiana, and while in the school band started playing various instruments, including the mellophone, the French horn, and tuba, as well as the trumpet, which would become his main focus. Forming his first band, the Jazz Contemporaries, he played at George's Bar on Indiana Avenue, and, in his teens, also worked locally with brothers Wes and Monk Montgomery, and worked with bassist Larry Ridley and saxophonist James Spaulding.

Trumpeter Lee Katzman, former sideman with Stan Kenton, recommended that Hubbard take trumpet lessons at the Arthur Jordan Conservatory of Music (now the Jordan College of the Arts at Butler University) with Max Woodbury, principal trumpeter of the Indianapolis Symphony Orchestra.

In 1958, at the age of 20, Hubbard moved to New York and began playing with some of the best jazz players of the era, including Philly Joe Jones, Sonny Rollins, Slide Hampton, Eric Dolphy, J. J. Johnson, and Quincy Jones. On June 19, 1960, Hubbard made his first record as a leader, Open Sesame, at the beginning of his contract with Blue Note Records, with saxophonist Tina Brooks, pianist McCoy Tyner, bassist Sam Jones, and drummer Clifford Jarvis. Six days later, he returned the favor to Brooks and recorded with him on True Blue.

== 1960s ==
In December 1960, Hubbard was invited to play on Ornette Coleman's Free Jazz, after Coleman heard him performing with Don Cherry. In May 1961, Hubbard played on Olé Coltrane, John Coltrane's final session for Atlantic Records. Coltrane also hired Hubbard, Eric Dolphy and Art Davis, who all appeared on Olé, to record Africa/Brass, Coltrane's first album with Impulse!, which was begun just after Olé.

In August 1961, Hubbard recorded Ready for Freddie (Blue Note), which was also his first collaboration with saxophonist Wayne Shorter. Hubbard became Shorter's bandmate when he replaced Lee Morgan in Art Blakey's Jazz Messengers later in 1961. He played on more than 10 live and studio recordings with Blakey during one of the most acclaimed eras of the Jazz Messengers, including Caravan, Ugetsu, Mosaic, and Free for All. In all, during the 1960s, he recorded eight studio albums as a bandleader for Blue Note, and more than two dozen as a sideman.

Hubbard remained with Blakey until 1966, leaving to form the first of several small groups of his own, which featured, among others, his Blue Note associate James Spaulding, pianist Kenny Barron and drummer Louis Hayes. This group recorded for Atlantic. It was during this time that Hubbard began to develop his own sound, distancing himself from the early influences of Clifford Brown and Morgan, and won the DownBeat jazz magazine "New Star" award on trumpet.

Throughout the 1960s, Hubbard played as a sideman on some of the most important albums from that era, including Oliver Nelson's The Blues and the Abstract Truth (1961), Eric Dolphy's Out to Lunch! (1964), Herbie Hancock's Maiden Voyage (1965), and Wayne Shorter's Speak No Evil (1966). Hubbard was described as "the most brilliant trumpeter of a generation of musicians who stand with one foot in 'tonal' jazz and the other in the atonal camp". Though he never fully embraced the free jazz of the 1960s, he appeared on two of its landmark albums: Coleman's Free Jazz (1961) and Coltrane's Ascension (1966), as well as on Sonny Rollins's "new thing" track "East Broadway Run Down" (on the 1966 album of the same name), with Elvin Jones and Jimmy Garrison.

== 1970s ==
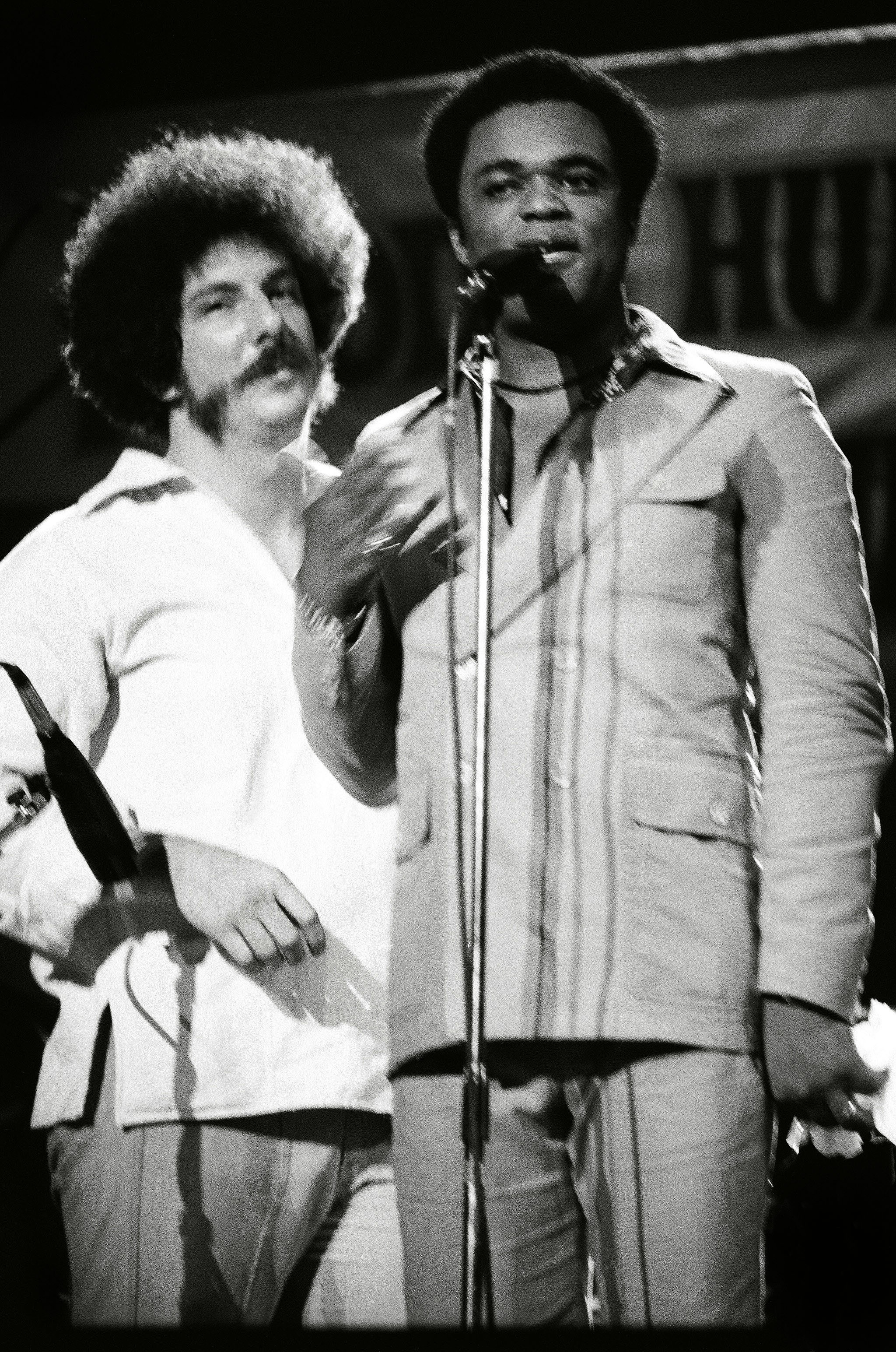
Hubbard with DJ Harry Abraham of WHAM, Rochester, c. 1978

Hubbard achieved his greatest popular success in the 1970s with a series of albums for Creed Taylor and his record label CTI Records, overshadowing Stanley Turrentine, Hubert Laws, and George Benson. Although his early 1970s jazz albums Red Clay (1970), Straight Life (1970), First Light (1971), and Sky Dive (1972) were particularly well received and considered among his best work, the albums he recorded later in the decade were attacked by critics for their commercialism. First Light won a 1972 Grammy Award and included pianists Herbie Hancock and Richard Wyands, guitarists Eric Gale and George Benson, bassist Ron Carter, drummer Jack DeJohnette, and percussionist Airto Moreira. In 1994, Hubbard, collaborating with Chicago jazz vocalist/co-writer Catherine Whitney, had lyrics set to the music of First Light.

In 1977, Hubbard joined the all-star V.S.O.P. band, which also featured Herbie Hancock, Tony Williams, Ron Carter and Wayne Shorter. All of the band's members except Hubbard were members of the mid-1960s Miles Davis Quintet. Several live recordings of this group were released as V.S.O.P, The Quintet, Tempest in the Colosseum (all 1977) and V.S.O.P. Live Under the Sky (1979).

Hubbard's trumpet playing was featured on the track "Zanzibar" from the 1978 Billy Joel album 52nd Street (the 1979 Grammy Award winner for Best Album). The track ends with a fade during Hubbard's performance. An unfaded version was released on the 2004 Billy Joel boxed set My Lives.

== Later life ==
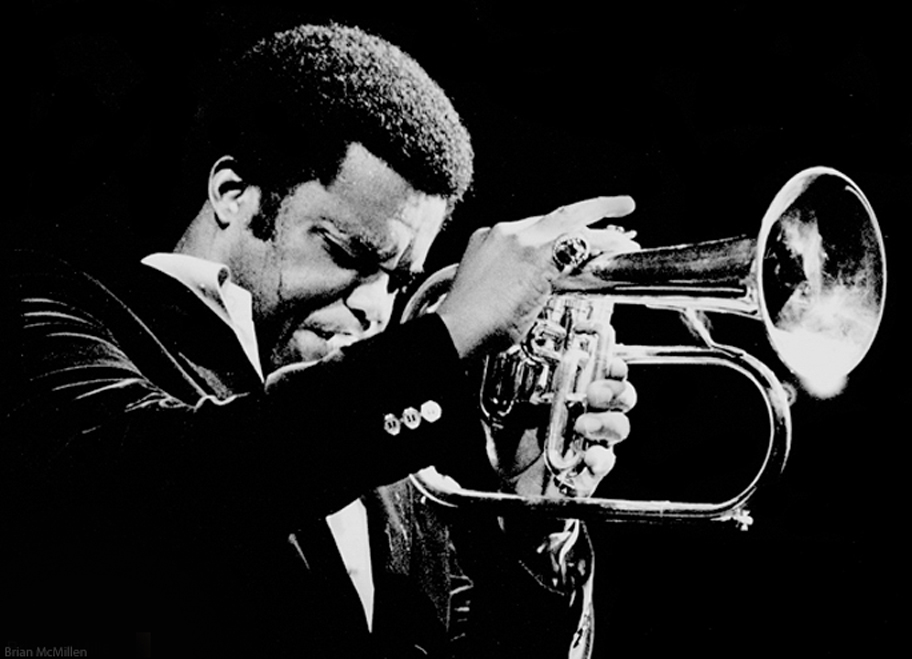
Hubbard at the Great American Music Hall, San Francisco, 1977

In the 1980s, Hubbard was again leading his own jazz group – this time with Billy Childs and Larry Klein, among others, as members – attracting favorable reviews, playing at concerts and festivals in the US and Europe, often in the company of Joe Henderson, playing a repertory of hard bop and modal jazz pieces. Hubbard played at the Monterey Jazz Festival in 1980 and in 1989 (with Bobby Hutcherson). He and Woody Shaw recorded two albums as co-leaders for Blue Note and played live concerts together from 1985 to 1987. In 1987, he was a co-leader with Benny Golson on the Stardust album.

In 1988, Hubbard again teamed up with Blakey at an engagement in the Netherlands, from which came Feel the Wind. In 1988, Hubbard played with Elton John, contributing trumpet and flugelhorn and trumpet solos on the track "Mona Lisas and Mad Hatters (Part Two)" for John's Reg Strikes Back album. In 1990, Hubbard appeared in Japan headlining an American-Japanese concert package that also featured Elvin Jones, Sonny Fortune, pianists George Duke and Benny Green, bass players Ron Carter, and Rufus Reid, with jazz vocalist Salena Jones. Hubbard also performed at the Warsaw Jazz Festival, at which Live at the Warsaw Jazz Festival (Jazzmen 1992) was recorded.

Following a long setback of health problems and a serious lip injury in 1992, when he subsequently developed an infection, Hubbard was again playing and recording occasionally, even if not at the level he set for himself during his earlier career. His best records ranked with the finest in his field.

== Death ==
On December 29, 2008, Hubbard died in Sherman Oaks, Los Angeles, California, from complications caused by a heart attack he suffered on November 26. Hubbard's body was cremated, with his ashes given to his family.

== Legacy and honors ==
In 2006, the National Endowment for the Arts accorded Hubbard its highest honor in jazz, the NEA Jazz Masters Award.

Hubbard had close ties to the Jazz Foundation of America in his later years. The Jazz Foundation of America's Musicians' Emergency Fund took care of him during times of illness. He is quoted as saying: "When I had congestive heart failure and couldn't work, the Jazz Foundation paid my mortgage for several months and saved my home! Thank God for those people." After his death, Hubbard's estate requested that tax-deductible donations be made in his name to the Jazz Foundation.

== Discography ==
=== As leader/co-leader ===
Recording date	Title	Label	Year released	Notes
1960–06	Open Sesame	Blue Note	1960	
1960–11	Goin' Up	Blue Note	1961	
1961–04	Hub Cap	Blue Note	1961	
1961–08	Groovy!/Minor Mishap	Fontana/Black Lion	1989	
1961–08	Ready for Freddie	Blue Note	1962	
1962–07	The Artistry of Freddie Hubbard	Impulse!	1963	
1962–10	Hub-Tones	Blue Note	1963	
1962–12	Here to Stay	Blue Note	1976	[2LP] The Blue Note Re-Issue Series
1963–03, 1963-05	The Body & the Soul	Impulse!	1964	
1964–05	Breaking Point!	Blue Note	1964	
1965–04	The Night of the Cookers	Blue Note	1965	Live
1965–06	Jam Gems: Live at the Left Bank with Jimmy Heath	Label M	2001	Live
1965–02, 1966–03	Blue Spirits	Blue Note	1967	
1966–10	Backlash	Atlantic	1967	
1967–04	Fastball: Live at the Left Bank	Hyena	2005	Live
1967–11	High Blues Pressure	Atlantic	1968	
1968–12, 1969–01	A Soul Experiment	Atlantic	1969	
1969–05	The Black Angel	Atlantic	1970	
1969–12	The Hub of Hubbard	MPS	1970	
1969–12	Without a Song: Live in Europe 1969	Blue Note	2009	Live
1970–01	Red Clay	CTI	1970	
1970–07, 1970–08	Straight Life	CTI	1971	
1970–11	Sing Me a Song of Songmy with İlhan Mimaroğlu	Atlantic	1971	
1971–09	First Light	CTI	1971	
1972–10	Sky Dive	CTI	1973	
1973–03	Freddie Hubbard/Stanley Turrentine in Concert Volume One	CTI	1973	Live
1973–03	In Concert Volume Two with Stanley Turrentine	CTI	1973	Live
1973–10	Keep Your Soul Together	CTI	1974	
1974–04, 1974–05	High Energy	Columbia	1974	
1975–03	Gleam	CBS/Sony	1975	Live
1975–03, 1975–04	Liquid Love	Columbia	1975	
1976	Windjammer	Columbia	1976	
1977	Bundle of Joy	Columbia	1977	
1978–03, 1978–04	Super Blue	Columbia	1978	
1979–02, 1979–03	The Love Connection	Columbia	1979	
1979–12	Skagly	Columbia	1980	
1980–07	Live at the North Sea Jazz Festival	Pablo	1980	Live
1980–09	Mistral	East World (Japan)/Liberty	1981	
1981–03	Outpost	Enja	1981	
1981–05	Rollin'	MPS	1982	Live
1981–06	Ride Like the Wind	Elektra/Asylum	1982	
1981?	Splash	Fantasy	1981	
1981–11	Keystone Bop: Sunday Night with Joe Henderson, Bobby Hutcherson	Prestige	1982	Live
1981–11	Keystone Bop Vol. 2: Friday & Saturday with Joe Henderson, Bobby Hutcherson	Prestige	1996	Live
1981–12	Born to Be Blue	Pablo	1982	
1982–06	Above & Beyond	Metropolitan	1999	Live
1982–08	Back to Birdland	Real Time	1983	
1983–06	Sweet Return	Atlantic	1983	
1983–12	The Rose Tattoo	Baystate	1984	
1985–11	Double Take with Woody Shaw	Blue Note	1985	
1987–01	Life Flight	Blue Note	1987	
1987–06	The Eternal Triangle with Woody Shaw	Blue Note	1987	
1988–10, 1988–11	Feel the Wind with Art Blakey	Timeless	1989	
1989?	Times Are Changing	Blue Note	1989	
1989–12	Topsy – Standard Book	Alfa	1990	
1990–12, 1991–01	Bolivia	MusicMasters	1991	
1991–10	At Jazz Jamboree Warszawa '91: A Tribute to Miles	Starburst	2000	Live
1991–12	Live at Fat Tuesday's	MusicMasters	1992	Live
1992–12	Blues for Miles	Alfa	1992	
1994–08, 1995–01	MMTC: Monk, Miles, Trane & Cannon	MusicMasters	1995	
2000–10 – 2000–12	New Colors	Hip Bop	2001	
2007–12	On the Real Side	Times Square	2008	
1967	On Fire: Live from the Blue Morocco	Resonance Records	2025	Live

Compilation

- Polar AC (CTI, 1975) - rec. 1971–73

=== As sideman ===
Sortable table with main artist alphabetically as primal order.

Main artist	Title	Year recorded	Label	Year released
Manny Albam	The Soul of the City	1966	Solid State	1966
Carl Allen and Manhattan Projects	Piccadilly Square	1989	Timeless	1993
Roberto Ávila & Sarava	Come to Brazil	1989	Sonet	1989
George Benson	The Other Side of Abbey Road	1969	A&M/CTI	1970
Walter Benton	Out of this World	1960	Jazzland	1960
Art Blakey	Mosaic	1961	Blue Note	1962
Art Blakey	Buhaina's Delight	1961	Blue Note	1963
Art Blakey	A Jazz Hour with Art Blakey's Jazz Messengers: Blues March	1961	Jazz Hour	1995
Art Blakey	Three Blind Mice	1961–62	United Artists	1962
Art Blakey	Caravan	1962	Riverside	1963
Art Blakey	Ugetsu	1963	Riverside	1963
Art Blakey	Kyoto	1964	Riverside	1966
Art Blakey	Free for All	1964	Blue Note	1965
Art Blakey	Golden Boy	1963	Colpix	1963
Art Blakey	Soul Finger	1965	Limelight	1965
The Big Apples	Autumn Leaves	1989	Pony Canyon	2001
Tina Brooks	True Blue	1960	Blue Note	1960
Kenny Burrell	God Bless the Child	1971	CTI	1971
George Cables	Cables' Vision	1979	Contemporary	1980
Betty Carter	Droppin' Things	1990	Verve	1990
Paul Chambers	Go	1959	Vee-Jay	1959
Ornette Coleman	Free Jazz: A Collective Improvisation	1960	Atlantic	1961
John Coltrane	Olé Coltrane	1961	Atlantic	1961
John Coltrane	Africa/Brass	1961	Impulse!	1961
John Coltrane	Ascension	1965	Impulse!	1966
Richard Davis	Muses for Richard Davis	1969	MPS	1970
Eric Dolphy	Outward Bound	1960	New Jazz	1960
Eric Dolphy	Out to Lunch!	1964	Blue Note	1964
Kenny Drew	Undercurrent	1960	Blue Note	1961
Charles Earland	Leaving This Planet	1973	Prestige	1974
Booker Ervin	Booker 'n' Brass	1967	Pacific Jazz	1967
Bill Evans	Interplay	1962	Riverside	1963
Joe Farrell	Sonic Text	1979	Contemporary	1980
Curtis Fuller	Boss of the Soul-Stream Trombone	1960	Warwick	1961
Curtis Fuller	Soul Trombone	1961	Impulse!	1961
Curtis Fuller	Cabin in the Sky	1962	Impulse!	1962
Dizzy Gillespie, Clark Terry and Oscar Peterson	The Trumpet Summit Meets the Oscar Peterson Big 4	1980	Pablo	1980
Dizzy Gillespie, Clark Terry and Oscar Peterson	The Alternate Blues	1980	Pablo	1980
Benny Golson	Take a Number from 1 to 10	1960–61	Argo	1961
Benny Golson	Pop + Jazz = Swing — jazz part also released as Just Jazz!	1962	Audio Fidelity	1962
Benny Golson	Time Speaks	1982	Baystate	1983
Benny Golson	Stardust	1987	Denon	1987
Dexter Gordon	Doin' Allright	1961	Blue Note	1961
Dexter Gordon	Clubhouse	1965	Blue Note	1979
Dexter Gordon	Generation	1972	Prestige	1973
Dexter Gordon	The Other Side of Round Midnight	1985	Blue Note	1986
Slide Hampton	Slide Hampton and His Horn of Plenty	1959	Strand	1959
Slide Hampton	Sister Salvation	1960	Atlantic	1960
Slide Hampton	Drum Suite	1962	Epic	1964
Herbie Hancock	Takin' Off	1962	Blue Note	1962
Herbie Hancock	Empyrean Isles	1964	Blue Note	1964
Herbie Hancock	Maiden Voyage	1965	Blue Note	1965
Herbie Hancock	Blow-Up	1966	MGM	1967
Herbie Hancock	V.S.O.P.	1976	Columbia	1977
Herbie Hancock	The Quintet	1977	Columbia	1977
Herbie Hancock	Tempest in the Colosseum	1977	CBS/Sony	1977
Herbie Hancock	V.S.O.P. Live Under the Sky	1979	CBS/Sony	1979
Herbie Hancock	Round Midnight (soundtrack)	1985	Columbia	1986
Jimmy Heath	The Quota	1961	Riverside	1961
Jimmy Heath	Triple Threat	1961	Riverside	1962
Joe Henderson	Big Band	1996	Verve	1997
Andrew Hill	Pax	1965	Blue Note	2006
Andrew Hill	Compulsion!!!!!	1965	Blue Note	1967
Bobby Hutcherson	Dialogue	1965	Blue Note	1965
Bobby Hutcherson	Components	1965	Blue Note	1966
Bobby Hutcherson	Knucklebean	1977	Blue Note	1977
Bobby Hutcherson	Highway One	1978	Columbia	1978
Milt Jackson	Sunflower	1972	CTI	1973
Milt Jackson	Goodbye— trumpet on "S.K.J." only	1972	CTI	1974
Billy Joel	52nd Street — trumpet on "Zanzibar" only	1978	Columbia	1978
Elton John	Reg Strikes Back	1987–88	Rocket/Mercury	1988
J. J. Johnson	J.J. Inc.	1960	Columbia	1961
Quincy Jones	I Dig Dancers	1960	Mercury	1961
Quincy Jones	The Quintessence	1961	Impulse!	1962
Quincy Jones	Golden Boy	1964	Mercury	1964
Quincy Jones	I/We Had a Ball	1964–65	Limelight	1965
Quincy Jones	Walking in Space	1969	A&M/CTI	1969
Quincy Jones	Gula Matari	1970	A&M	1970
Chaka Khan	Echoes of an Era	1981–82	Blue Note	1982
John Lewis	Essence	1960–62	Atlantic	1965
Mel Lewis	Mel Lewis and Friends	1976	A&M/Horizon	1977
Kirk Lightsey	Temptation	1991	Timeless	1991
Jeff Lorber	Water Sign	1979	Arista	1979
Ronnie Mathews	Doin' the Thang!	1963	Prestige	1964
Jackie McLean	Bluesnik	1961	Elektra/Musician	1962
The Modern Jazz Quartet	MJQ & Friends: A 40th Anniversary Celebration	1992–93	Atlantic	1994
Wes Montgomery	Fingerpickin'	1957–58	Pacific Jazz	1958
Wes Montgomery	Road Song	1968	A&M	1968
Hank Mobley	Roll Call	1960	Blue Note	1961
Alphonse Mouzon	By All Means	1980	Pausa	1980
Oliver Nelson	The Blues and the Abstract Truth	1961	Impulse!	1961
Cecil Payne	Cerupa	1993	Delmark	1995
Duke Pearson	Dedication!/Minor Mishap (Hubbard)	1961	Prestige/Black Lion	1970/1989
Duke Pearson	Sweet Honey Bee	1966	Blue Note	1967
Duke Pearson	The Right Touch	1967	Blue Note	1968
Oscar Peterson	Face to Face	1982	Pablo	1982
Sam Rivers	Contours	1965	Blue Note	1967
Max Roach	Drums Unlimited	1965–66	Atlantic	1965
Sonny Rollins	East Broadway Run Down	1966	Impulse!	1966
Rufus	Numbers	1979?	ABC	1979
Poncho Sanchez	Cambios	1991	Concord Picante	1991
Lalo Schifrin	Once a Thief and Other Themes	1965	Verve	1965
Don Sebesky	Giant Box	1973	CTI	1973
Wayne Shorter	Wayning Moments	1961	Vee-Jay	1962
Wayne Shorter	Speak No Evil	1964	Blue Note	1966
Wayne Shorter	The Soothsayer	1965	Blue Note	1979
Wayne Shorter	The All Seeing Eye	1965	Blue Note	1966
Leon Thomas	A Piece of Cake	1980	Palcoscenico	1980
Stanley Turrentine	Sugar	1970	CTI	1970
Stanley Turrentine	More Than a Mood	1992	MusicMasters	1992
McCoy Tyner	Together	1978	Milestone	1979
McCoy Tyner	Quartets 4 X 4 — on three tracks as part of one quartet	1980	Milestone	1980
Cedar Walton	Soundscapes	1980	Columbia	1980
Randy Weston	Uhuru Afrika	1960	Roulette	1961
Randy Weston	Blue Moses	1972	CTI	1972
V.A.	One Night with Blue Note Preserved	1985	Blue Note	1985

== Filmography ==
- 1981 – Studiolive (Sony)
- 1985 – One Night with Blue Note
- 2004 – Live at the Village Vanguard (Immortal)
- 2005 – All Blues (FS World Jazz)
- 2009 – Freddie Hubbard: One of a Kind
