= Kathy McCord =

American actress (1952 - 2015)

- Birth name: Kathleen McCord
- Also known as: Kat McCord
- Born: February 18, 1952; Hartsdale, New York, United States
- Died: October 28, 2015 (aged 63)
- Genres: Folk, psych rock, pop rock
- Occupation(s): Singer, songwriter
- Instrument: Vocals
- Years active: 1968–1987
- Labels: CTI, Manhattan, Rainy Day, Big Beat

Kathleen "Kathy" McCord (February 18, 1952 – October 28, 2015) was an American singer and musician.

== Biography ==
McCord was born on February 18, 1952, to Bill and Ann McCord. Both of them were in show business: Bill was a radio and television announcer at NBC, whilst Ann was a singer who sang backup on Perry Como's TV show and hit records like "Catch a Falling Star", "Round and Round" and "Magic Moments". Kathy attended school at Sacred Heart School and Woodlands High School in New York, showing interest for painting, poetry and singing. Before she was ten, she was already winning talent shows. She won a contest set at the Colonial Inn, in Miami, singing "School Days". Her influences were Motown soul artists, Dusty Springfield, Bob Dylan, The Beatles, Joni Mitchell and Aretha Franklin, among the others.

She was introduced to Chip Taylor by her brother, Billy Vera, when she was 16 years old. Taylor wrote two songs for her, "I'll Give My Heart to You" and "I'll Never Be Alone Again", originally issued on the Rainy Day label. However, the sales were poor and nothing came of it. A year later, manager Murri Barber, impressed by McCord's singing and writing, suggested they should bring her to producer Creed Taylor, who was starting CTI Records at the time. He finally chose her as his first artist, leading to the first CTI album, Kathy McCord (CTI 1001), and the single "Take Away This Pain" (CTI 502). Eventually, business difficulties arose between Taylor and the McCords, and a few months later, Billy Vera's former manager, Al Schwartz, introduced her to singer Austin Grasmere: the two made some demos together, but nothing came of it.

Thanks to promoter Michael Lang, she managed to record sixteen tracks in Woodstock, New York, which were not released back then, but that have been recently brought back to light and issued on the collection New Jersey to Woodstock. She never produced other notable recordings, but continued to sing background for saxophonist David Sanborn, his brother and others. By the late 1970s, she had moved to Atlanta, Georgia where, with singer Diane Scanlon, recorded some more demos, then moved back to Hartsdale to join a local cover band. Following a decade marked by disappointments and a few collaborations, she moved to Florida in 1987, "sick of banging her head against the wall", and retired from the music world. "It was a great fun, a grand journey", she recalls, "but I just got tired." In more recent times, she returned to painting. She died of cancer on October 28, 2015, Fort Lauderdale, Florida.
