= Bobby Hutcherson discography =

This is the discography for the American jazz musician Bobby Hutcherson.

== As leader/co-leader ==
Recording date	Title / Co-leaders	Label	Year released	Notes
1963–12	The Kicker	Blue Note	1999	Connoisseur series
1965–04	Dialogue	Blue Note	1965	
1965–06	Components	Blue Note	1966	
1966–02	Happenings	Blue Note	1967	
1966–06	Stick-Up!	Blue Note	1968	
1967–07	Oblique	Blue Note	1979	Japan only. Reissued on CD (1990).
1968–03	Patterns	Blue Note	1980	LT series. Reissued CD (1995) includes an alternate take.
1968–07	Total Eclipse	Blue Note	1969	
1965–04, 1968–11	Spiral	Blue Note	1979	LT series
1969–07	Blow Up with Harold Land	Jazz Music Yesterday	1990	Live at Jazz à Juan in Juan-les-Pins
1969–08	Medina	Blue Note	1980	LT series
1969–10, 1969–11	Now! featuring Harold Land	Blue Note	1970	Reissued CD (2004) includes live rec. 1977
1970–07	San Francisco featuring Harold Land	Blue Note	1971	
1971–07	Head On	Blue Note	1971	Reissued CD (2008) includes unreleased materials
1972–03	Natural Illusions	Blue Note	1972	
1973–07	Bobby Hutcherson Live at Montreux	Blue Note	1974	Live. LA series. Japan and Europe only. Reissued CD (1994) includes an unreleased recording of the concert.
1974–04	Cirrus	Blue Note	1974	LA series
1975–01	Linger Lane	Blue Note	1975	LA series
1975–03	Inner Glow	Blue Note	1980	Japan only. The tracks were included in box set Mosaic Select 26: Bobby Hutcherson (2007).
1975–08	Montara	Blue Note	1975	LA series
1976–02	Waiting	Blue Note	1976	LA series
1976–08	The View from the Inside	Blue Note	1976	LA series
1977–03	Knucklebean	Blue Note	1977	LA series
1978–05 – 1978–06	Highway One	Columbia	1978	
1979–03	Conception: The Gift of Love	Columbia	1979	
1979	Un Poco Loco	Columbia	1980	
1980–08	Little B's Poem	Live at E.J.'s	1999	[2CD] Live
1981–09, 1981–10, 1982–02, 1982–03	Solo / Quartet	Contemporary	1982	
1982–07	Farewell Keystone	Theresa	1988	Live
1983–12	Four Seasons with George Cables, Herbie Lewis and Philly Joe Jones, originally released as Nice Groove (Baystate, 1984)	Timeless	1985	
1984–08	Good Bait	Landmark	1985	
1985–10	Color Schemes	Landmark	1986	
1986–12	In the Vanguard	Landmark	1987	Live
1988–04	Cruisin' the 'Bird	Landmark	1988	
1989-08 – 1989–09	Ambos Mundos	Landmark	1989	
1991–02	Mirage	Landmark	1991	
1993–03	Acoustic Masters II with Craig Handy, et al.	Atlantic	1994	
1993–12	Manhattan Moods with McCoy Tyner	Blue Note	1994	
1998–08	Skyline	Verve	1999	
2002–09	Land of Giants with McCoy Tyner, Charnett Moffett, Eric Harland	Telarc Jazz	2003	
2006–11	For Sentimental Reasons	Kind of Blue	2007	
2009–02	Wise One	Kind of Blue	2009	John Coltrane tribute
2009–10	Somewhere in the Night	Kind of Blue	2012	Live at Jazz at Lincoln Center
2014?	Enjoy the View	Blue Note	2014	

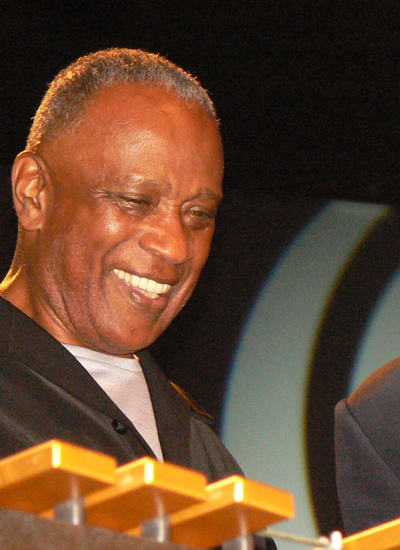
Hutcherson in 2007

compilations

- Silver Rondo (UpFront, 1975)
- Procession (UpFront, 1976)
- The Best of Bobby Hutcherson (Columbia, 1981)
- Landmarks: A Compilation (1984–1986) (Landmarks, 1991)
- The Best of the Blue Note Years (Blue Note, 2001)
- Essential Blue: The Classic of Bobby Hutcherson (Blue Note, 2007)

== Omnibus live recording ==
- Bobby Hutcherson, Carmen McRae & Earl Klugh, Blue Note Meets the L.A. Philharmonic (Blue Note, 1978) – live at the Hollywood Bowl in 1977 with the Los Angeles Philharmonic. LA series.

== As a member ==
Timeless All Stars

- It's Timeless (Timeless, 1982) – live at Keystone Korner
- Timeless Heart (Timeless, 1983)
- Essence (Delos, 1986)
- Time for the Timeless All Stars (Early Bird, 1991)

SFJAZZ Collective

- Live 2004 Inaugural Concert Tour (SFJazz, 2004)
- SFJAZZ Collective (Nonesuch, 2005) – rec. 2004
- Live 2005 2nd Annual Concert Tour (SFJazz, 2005)
- SFJAZZ Collective 2 (Nonesuch, 2006) – rec. 2005
- Live 2006 3rd Annual Concert Tour (SFJazz, 2006)
- Live 2007 4th Annual Concert Tour (SFJazz, 2007)

== As sideman ==
With Donald Byrd

- Ethiopian Knights (Blue Note, 1972) – rec. 1971
- A City Called Heaven (Landmark, 1991)

With Eric Dolphy

- Conversations (Fred Miles, 1963)
- Out to Lunch! (Blue Note, 1964)
- Iron Man (Douglas, 1968) – rec. 1963

With Bruce Forman

- Full Circle (Concord, 1984)
- There are Times (Concord, 1987)

With Kenny Garrett

- Happy People (Warner Bros., 2002) – rec. 2001
- Beyond the Wall (Nonesuch, 2006)

With Dexter Gordon

- Gettin' Around (Blue Note, 1966) – rec. 1965
- Sophisticated Giant (Columbia, 1977)
- The Other Side of Round Midnight (Blue Note, 1985)

With Grant Green

- Idle Moments (Blue Note, 1965) – rec. 1963
- Street of Dreams (Blue Note, 1967) – rec. 1964

With Al Grey

- Snap Your Fingers (Argo, 1962)
- Night Song (Argo, 1962)
- Having a Ball (Argo, 1963)
- The Al Grey and Dave Burn Sessions (compilation of the above three issued under Bobby Hutcherson's name, Lone Hill Jazz, 2004)

With John Hicks

- John Hicks (Theresa; Evidence, 1982)
- In Concert (Theresa; Evidence, 1986) – rec. 1984

With Andrew Hill

- Judgment! (Blue Note, 1963)
- Andrew!!! (Blue Note, 1964)
- Eternal Spirit (Blue Note, 1989)

With Freddie Hubbard

- Keystone Bop: Sunday Night (Prestige, 1981)
- Keystone Bop Vol. 2: Friday & Saturday (Prestige, 1996) – rec. 1981

With Harold Land

- The Peace-Maker (Cadet, 1967)
- A New Shade of Blue (Mainstream, 1971)
- Choma (Mainstream, 1971)
- Xocia's Dance (Muse, 1981)

With Jackie McLean

- One Step Beyond (Blue Note, 1963)
- Destination... Out! (Blue Note, 1964)
- Action Action Action (Blue Note, 1964)

With Duke Pearson

- The Phantom (Blue Note, 1968)
- I Don't Care Who Knows It (Blue Note, 1996) – rec. 1969

With Woody Shaw

- Master of the Art (Elektra/Musician, 1982) – live
- Night Music (Elektra/Musician, 1983) – live rec. 1982

With Archie Shepp

- On This Night (Impulse!, 1965)
- New Thing at Newport (Impulse!, 1966) – live

With McCoy Tyner

- Time for Tyner (Blue Note, 1969) – rec. 1968
- Sama Layuca (Milestone, 1974)
- Together (Milestone, 1979) – rec. 1978
- Quartets 4 X 4 (Milestone, 1980)
- La Leyenda de La Hora (Columbia, 1981)

With Tony Williams

- Life Time (Blue Note, 1965) – rec. 1964
- Foreign Intrigue (Blue Note, 1985)

With Gerald Wilson

- Everywhere (Pacific Jazz, 1968) – rec. 1967–1968
- California Soul (World Pacific, 1968)
- Eternal Equinox (World Pacific, 1969)

With others

- Curtis Amy & Frank Butler, Groovin' Blue (Pacific Jazz, 1961)
- The Aquarians, Jungle Grass (Uni, 1969)
- Kenny Barron, Other Places (Verve, 1993)
- Bayete, Worlds Around the Sun (Prestige, 1972)
- Dave Burns, Warming Up (Vanguard, 1962)
- George Cables, Cables' Vision (Contemporary, 1980)
- Stanley Cowell, Brilliant Circles (Freedom Records, 1972)
- Joey DeFrancesco, Organic Vibes (Concord, 2006)
- Smith Dobson, Sasha Bossa (Quartet, 1988)
- Chico Freeman, Destiny's Dance (Contemporary, 1982)
- Luis Gasca, Collage (Fantasy, 1975)
- Herbie Hancock, Round Midnight (Columbia, 1986)
- John Handy, New View (Columbia, 1967)
- Roy Haynes, Thank You Thank You (Galaxy, 1977)
- Eddie Henderson, Sunburst (Blue Note, 1975)
- Joe Henderson, Mode for Joe (Blue Note, 1966)
- Stix Hooper, The World Within (MCA, 1979)
- Ron Jefferson, Love Lifted Me (Pacific Jazz, 1962)
- Barney Kessel, Feeling Free (Contemporary, 1969)
- Osamu Kitajima, Masterless Samurai (Headfirst, 1980)
- Prince Lasha & Sonny Simmons, Firebirds (Contemporary, 1968)
- John Lewis, Slavic Smile (Baystate, 1982)
- Abbey Lincoln, Wholly Earth (Verve, 1999)
- Eddie Marshall, Dance of the Sun (Timeless, 1977)
- Les McCann, "Oat Meal" b/w "One More Ham Hock Please" (Pacific Jazz, 1961) – 45 rpm 7-inch single
- Billy Mitchell, This Is Billy Mitchell (Smash, 1962)
- Grachan Moncur III, Evolution (Blue Note, 1964)
- Frank Morgan, Reflections (Contemporary, 1989)
- Lee Morgan, The Procrastinator (Blue Note, 1978)
- Grassella Oliphant, The Grass Roots (Atlantic, 1965)
- John Patton, Let 'em Roll (Blue Note, 1965)
- Lou Rawls, At Last (Blue Note, 1989)
- Dianne Reeves, I Remember (Blue Note, 1988)
- Sonny Rollins, No Problem (Milestone, 1981)
- Ted Rosenthal, Calling You (CTI, 1992)
- Joe Sample, Roles (MCA, 1987)
- Pharoah Sanders, Rejoice (Theresa, 1981)
- Sonny Stitt, Just in Case You Forgot How Bad He Really Was (32 Jazz, 1981)
- Harold Vick, The Caribbean Suite (RCA Victor, 1967)
- Larry Vuckovich, Blue Balkan (Inner City, 1980)
- Cedar Walton, Among Friends (Theresa, 1989)
- Paula West, Come What May (Hi Horse, 2001)
- Various Artists, The New Wave in Jazz (Impulse!, 1965)
