= Oblique (album) =

Studio album by Bobby Hutcherson
- Released: 1979 (Japan); 1990 (CD)
- Recorded: July 21, 1967
- Studio: Van Gelder Studio, Englewood Cliffs, NJ
- Genre: Jazz; post-bop
- Length: 41:02
- Label: Blue Note; GXF-3061; CDP 7 84444 2
- Producer: Alfred Lion

Bobby Hutcherson chronology
Highway One (1978)	Oblique (1979)	Spiral (1979)

Alternative cover
- 2005 RVG Edition

Oblique is an album by vibraphonist Bobby Hutcherson, featuring performances by Herbie Hancock, Albert Stinson, and Joe Chambers. The album was recorded on July 21, 1967. Oblique was Hutcherson's second recording in a quartet setting, after Happenings, The personnel on Happenings are identical, save the replacement of Bob Cranshaw with Stinson,. Blue Note did not release the album until 1979, as a limited edition in Japan, followed by a regular issue in 1990.

== Reception ==
Professional ratings
Review scores
Source	Rating
AllMusic	4.5/5 stars
The Penguin Guide to Jazz	3/4 stars

AllMusic reviewer Steve Huey awarded four and a half stars to the album, saying: "All the performances are spirited enough to make the sophisticated music sound winning and accessible as well, which means that Oblique is one of the better entries in Hutcherson's Blue Note discography and one worth tracking down." The Penguin Guide to Jazz wrote that the quartet recording was "a likeable enough set, but [it] doesn't really add anything to the language of the first [Happenings]".

== Track listing ==
1. "'Til Then" (Hutcherson) - 4:44
2. "My Joy" (Hutcherson) - 7:10
3. "Theme from Blow Up" (Hancock) - 8:13
4. "Subtle Neptune" (Hutcherson) - 8:33
5. "Oblique" (Chambers) - 7:18
6. "Bi-Sectional" (Chambers) - 5:04

== Personnel ==
Musicians

- Bobby Hutcherson - vibes, drums
- Herbie Hancock - piano
- Albert Stinson - bass
- Joe Chambers - drums, tympani, gong

Production

- Alfred Lion – original session producer
- Rudy Van Gelder – recording engineer
- Michael Cuscuna – release producer
- Katsuji Abe – original cover design, photography
- Patrick Roques – reissue (2005) cover design
- Francis Wolff – reissue (2005) cover photography
