= Now! (Bobby Hutcherson album) =

Studio album by Bobby Hutcherson featuring Harold Land
- Released: June 1970; October 2004 (CD)
- Recorded: October 3, 1969 (#2–3); November 5, 1969 (#1, 4–5); August 13, 1977 (CD: #6–9)
- Venues: Hollywood Bowl, Los Angeles, CA
- Studios: A&R Studios, New York City
- Genres: Hard bop Post bop Avant-garde jazz
- Length: 35:43 (LP); 48:28 (CD)
- Labels: Blue Note; BST 84333; 7243 8 66742 2 7
- Producers: Duke Pearson (#1–5); George Butler (CD: #6–9)

Bobby Hutcherson chronology
Total Eclipse (1969)	Now! (1970)	San Francisco (1971)

Harold Land chronology
The Peace-Maker (1968)	Now! (1970)	San Francisco (1971)

Professional ratings
Review scores
Source	Rating
Allmusic	4/5 stars
The Penguin Guide to Jazz	4/4 stars
The Rolling Stone Jazz Record Guide	2/5 stars
Tom Hull	B−

Now! is an album by jazz vibraphonist Bobby Hutcherson, released on the Blue Note label. The album is the first of Hutcherson's to feature vocals, contributed by Gene McDaniels and a chorus. The CD reissue includes four tracks recorded live at the Hollywood Bowl, in 1977.

== Track listing ==
Original tracks

1. "Slow Change" (Hutcherson, McDaniels) - 7:17
2. "Hello to the Wind" (Chambers, McDaniels) - 5:59
3. "Now" (Hutcherson, McDaniels) - 2:46
4. "The Creators" (Herbie Lewis) - 12:35
5. "Black Heroes" (Harold Land) - 7:06

Additional live tracks on CD (2004)

6. "Slow Change" (Hutcherson, McDaniels) - 5:05
7. "Now" (Hutcherson, McDaniels) - 2:49
8. "Hello to the Wind" (Chambers, McDaniels) - 3:08
9. "Now" [Reprise] (Hutcherson, McDaniels) - 1:43

== Personnel ==
Tracks 2–3

- Bobby Hutcherson - vibraphone, marimba
- Harold Land - tenor saxophone
- Kenny Barron - piano
- Wally Richardson - guitar
- Herbie Lewis - bass
- Joe Chambers - drums
- Candido Camero - congas
- Gene McDaniels- lead vocals
- Hilda Harris, Albertine M. Robinson, Christine Spencer - backing vocals

Recorded at A & R Studios, New York on October 3, 1969.

Tracks 1, 4–5

- Bobby Hutcherson - vibes
- Harold Land - tenor saxophone
- Stanley Cowell - piano, electric piano
- Wally Richardson - guitar
- Herbie Lewis - bass
- Joe Chambers - drums
- Candido Camero - congas, bongo
- Gene McDaniels - lead vocals
- Eileen Gilbert, Christine Spencer, Maeretha Stewart - backing vocals

Recorded at A & R Studios, New York on November 5, 1969.

Tracks 6–9

- Bobby Hutcherson - vibes
- Manny Boyd - tenor sax, soprano sax
- George Cables - piano
- James Leary - bass
- Eddie Marshall - drums
- Bobbye Hall Porter - percussion
- Dale Oehler - arranger
- Los Angeles Philharmonic conducted by Calvin Simmons

Recorded live at the Hollywood Bowl, Los Angeles on August 13, 1977.
