= Linger Lane =

Studio album by Bobby Hutcherson
- Released: 1975
- Recorded: January 16, 1975 outdoors in Idyllwild, California
- Genre: Jazz
- Length: 31:00
- Label: Blue Note; BN LA 369
- Producer: Jerry Peters, Keg Johnson, Jim Shifflett

Bobby Hutcherson chronology
Cirrus (1974)	Linger Lane (1975)	Inner Glow (1975)

Linger Lane is an album by American jazz vibraphonist Bobby Hutcherson recorded in 1975 and released on the Blue Note label.

== Reception ==
The Allmusic review awarded the album 2 stars.

Professional ratings
Review scores
Source	Rating
Allmusic	2/5 stars

== Track listing ==
All compositions by Bobby Hutcherson except as indicated

1. "People Make the World Go Round" (Thom Bell, Linda Creed) – 8:43
2. "Theme from M*A*S*H" (Mike Altman, Johnny Mandel) – 4:28
3. "Ntu" – 5:47
4. "Manzanita" – 4:00
5. "Mountain Caravan" (Jerry Peters) – 5:16
6. "Silver Rondo" – 2:46

== Personnel ==
- Bobby Hutcherson – marimba, arranger
- Jerry Peters – electric piano, arranger
- Ernie Watts – reeds
- John Rowin – guitar
- Chuck Rainey – electric bass
- Harvey Mason – drums
- Bobbye Porter Hall – percussion
- Julia Waters – vocals
- Luther Waters – vocals
- Maxine Waters – vocals
- Oren Waters – vocals
