= Ambos Mundos (album) =

Studio album by Bobby Hutcherson
- Released: 1989
- Recorded: August–September 1989
- Genre: Jazz
- Length: 52:39 CD release with additional track
- Label: Landmark; LLP/LCD 1522
- Producer: Orrin Keepnews

Bobby Hutcherson chronology
Cruisin' the 'Bird (1988)	Ambos Mundos (1989)	Blow Up (1990)

Ambos Mundos is an album by vibraphonist Bobby Hutcherson featuring performances recorded in 1989 and released the following year on Orrin Keepnews' Landmark label.

== Reception ==
Professional ratings
Review scores
Source	Rating
Allmusic	4/5 stars

On Allmusic, Scott Yanow observed "This Landmark session was a change of pace for vibraphonist Bobby Hutcherson, an Afro-Cuban set in which he uses an expanded group. ... Intriguing and consistently exciting music".

== Track listing ==
All compositions by Bobby Hutcherson except where noted.

1. "Pomponio" – 6:26
2. "Tin Tin Deo" (Chano Pozo, Gil Fuller) – 8:34
3. "Both Worlds" – 7:01
4. "Street Song" – 6:49
5. "Beep d' Bop" – 5:05
6. "Poema Para Ravel" – 5:55
7. "Yelapa" (Eddie Marshall) – 5:40
8. "Bésame Mucho" (Consuelo Velázquez, Sunny Skylar) – 6:16

== Personnel ==
- Bobby Hutcherson – vibraphone, marimba
- James Spaulding – flute
- Smith Dobson – piano
- Randy Vincent – guitar
- Bruce Forman (tracks 2 & 8) – guitar
- Jeff Chambers– bass
- Eddie Marshall – drums
- Francisco Aguabella – congas
- Orestes Vilató – timbales, congas
- Roger Glenn – percussion, flute
