= Dale Oehler =

American arranger, producer and pianist (1941–2018)

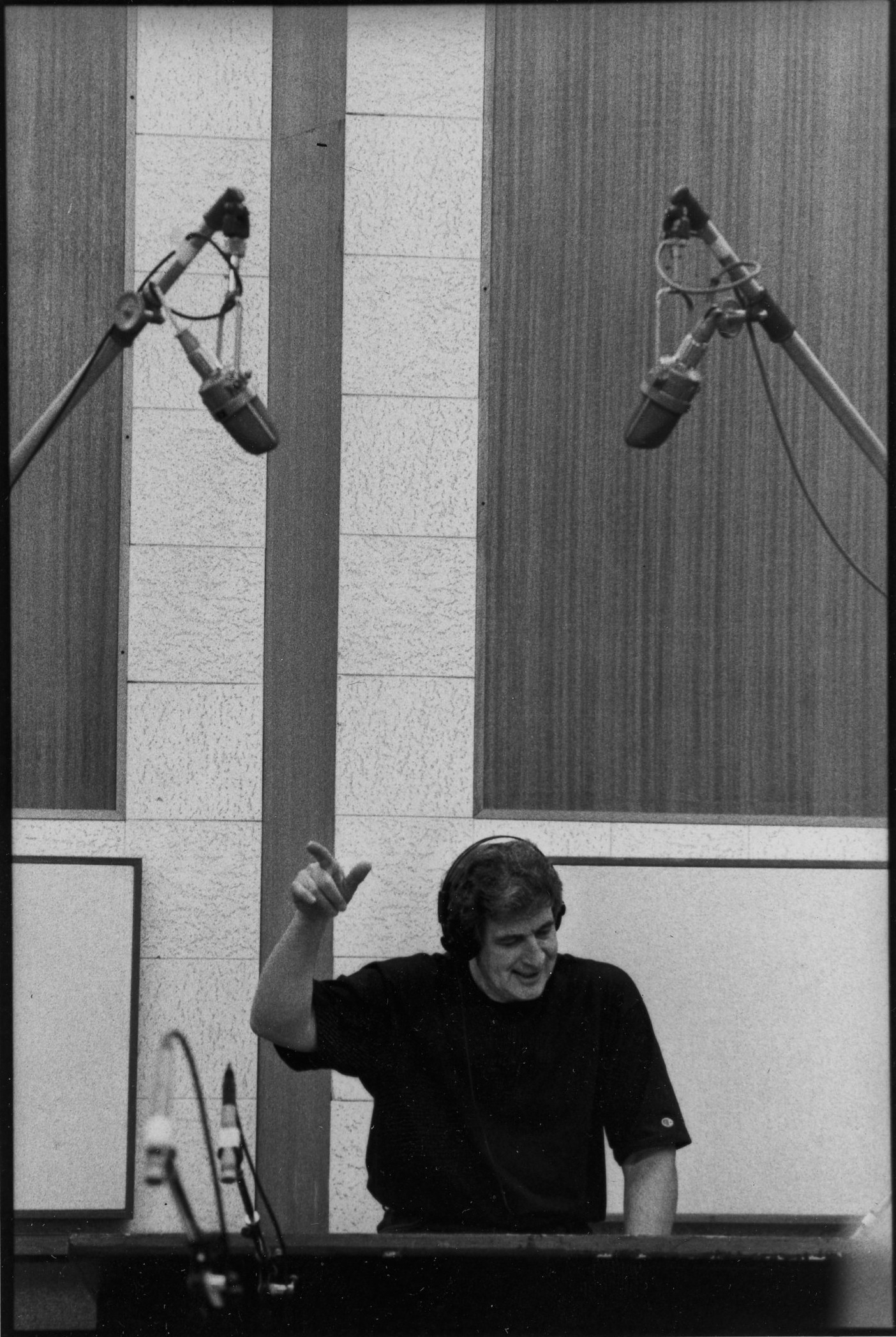
- Oehler at a recording session in the mid-1990s

Background information
- Born: October 1, 1941 (age 84)
- Origin: Springfield, Illinois
- Died: November 5th, 2018
- Occupations: Arranger, composer, musician, producer
- Instrument: Piano
- Years active: 1957–2018
- Labels: Columbia Records, Blue Note, Warner Bros. Records, Elektra/Asylum and others

Dale Dixon Oehler (October 1, 1941 – November 5, 2018) was an American arranger, producer and pianist.

Oehler's work fuses various elements to enhance several genre of music he worked on, including jazz, pop, country, R&B or easy listening. His credits include artists such as Marvin Gaye, Freddie Hubbard, Joni Mitchell and Andre Kostelanetz. Leonard Feather once described Oehler, in his Los Angeles Times jazz column, as "an adaptable writer".

== Early career ==
In his early childhood, Dale received formal piano training in the Classics. While in his teens, Oehler started playing jazz gigs in the Springfield, Illinois area. He later played at clubs in the Chicago area while attending Northwestern University in Evanston, Illinois.

After graduation he went to Cedar Rapids, Iowa to play with J. R. Monterose at the Tender Trap. Other notables that came through the club were Al Jarreau, Dave Sanborn, Freddie Waits and Cecil McBee. He segued from playing in Cedar Rapids to attending the University of Iowa at Iowa City where he pursued his master's degree in Composition and was able to establish the first Jazz Program at that university. While going to school, he represented the University of Iowa at the University of Notre Dame Jazz Festival in 1965 where he received Best Arranger and Best Pianist awards, as judged by Quincy Jones and Clark Terry.

Oehler also played on J.R. Monterose (Studio 4 Records, 1964). While at the University of Iowa, he arranged his first professional record for Bugsy Maugh (Dot Records, 1968), which received a Grammy Award nomination the following year.

== Later career ==
In 1969, Oehler, now married, moved to the Los Angeles, California area to pursue a career in music. In the early 1970s, Oehler again met up with J.J. Johnson, whom he had met in the early 1960s when Johnson was with the Miles Davis band. Johnson was responsible for introducing Dale to Marvin Gaye, with whom he subsequently arranged Trouble Man (1972), which was the main title for the movie of the same name. Also during this period, he reconnected with Tom McIntosh, whom he had first met in 1962 while Tom was with the Art Farmer and Benny Golson Jazztet. Tom was instrumental in providing the opportunity to write various film cues, which included Shaft’s Big Score. It was during that film Dale met Freddie Hubbard, following which Freddie asked Dale to arrange his first Columbia record, entitled High Energy (1974). He also worked on You Light Up My Life, arranging the title tune for Andre Kostelanetz.

Beginning in 1975, he worked at Blue Note Records with Bobby Hutcherson, Carmen McRae and Horace Silver. Oehler's Warner Bros. Records work included Al Jarreau, Randy Crawford and Jennifer Holliday. He also worked on Joni Mitchell's The Hissing of Summer Lawns (Elektra/Asylum).

In 1978, Oehler produced and arranged the Freddie Hubbard album, Super Blue, which featured Joe Henderson, Hubert Laws, Ron Carter, Jack DeJohnette, Kenny Barron and George Benson.

During the 1990s, Oehler's credits included work on albums for Dolly Parton, Kirk Whalum, Joe Sample, Diane Schuur and Mark Whitfield (featuring Diana Krall).

== Discography ==
=== As producer ===
Bobby Hutcherson

- Montara (Blue Note, 1975)
- Waiting (Blue Note, 1976)
- The View from the Inside (Blue Note, 1977)
- Knucklebean (Blue Note, 1977)
- Un Poco Loco (Columbia, 1980)

Others

- Moacir Santos, Carnival of the Spirits (Blue Note, 1975)
- Carmen McRae, Can’t Hide Love (Blue Note, 1976)
- David Sanborn, Promise Me the Moon (Warner Bros., 1977)
- Freddie Hubbard, Super Blue (Columbia, 1978)

=== As arranger ===
- 1968 (Bugsy Maugh) Inside Bugsy (Dot)
- 1972 (film cues) Shaft's Big Score! (MGM)
- 1972 (Marvin Gaye) Trouble Man (Tamla)
- 1973 (film cues) Willie Dynamite (MCA)
- 1974 (Freddie Hubbard) High Energy (Columbia)
- 1975 (Joni Mitchell) The Hissing of Summer Lawns (Elektra/Asylum)
- 1975 (Marlena Shaw) Who Is This Bitch, Anyway? (Blue Note)
- 1976 (Carmen McRae) Can’t Hide Love (Blue Note)
- 1976 (Al Jarreau) Glow (Warner Bros.)
- 1977 (David Sanborn) Promise Me the Moon (Warner Bros.)
- 1978 (Andre Kostelanetz) You Light Up My Life (Columbia)
- 1978 (Freddie Hubbard) Super Blue (Columbia)
- 1978 (V.A.)Blue Note Meets the L.A. Philharmonic (Blue Note)
- 1979 (Horace Silver) Silver 'n Strings Play the Music of the Spheres (Blue Note)
- 1979 (Evie Sands) Suspended Animation (RCA Victor)
- 1980 (Bobby Hutcherson) Un Poco Loco (Columbia)
- 1981 (Randy Crawford) Secret Combination (Warner Bros.)
- 1983 (Randy Crawford) Nightline (Warner Bros.)
- 1985 (Jennifer Holliday) Say You Love Me (Warner Bros.)
- 1992 (Jimmy Scott) All the Way (Sire)
- 1993 (Joe Sample) Invitation (Warner Bros.)
- 1995 (Dolly Parton) Something Special (Columbia)
- 1995 (Kirk Whalum) In This Life (Columbia)
- 1995 (Diane Schuur) Love Walked In (GRP)
- 1997 (Mark Whitfield) Forever Love (Verve)

=== As a piano player ===
- J. R. Monterose, J. R. Monterose (Studio 4, 1964)
- Bugsy Maugh, Inside Bugsy (Dot, 1968)
- David Sanborn, Promise Me the Moon (Warner Bros., 1977)
- Freddie Hubbard, Super Blue (Columbia, 1978)
- J. R. Monterose, Live at the Tender Trap (Fresh Sound, 1993)
