= Highway One (album) =

Studio album by Bobby Hutcherson
- Released: 1978
- Recorded: May 30 – June 23, 1978
- Genre: Jazz
- Length: 41:45
- Label: Columbia
- Producer: Todd Barkan and Cedar Walton

Bobby Hutcherson chronology
Knucklebean (1976)	Highway One (1978)	Conception: The Gift of Love (1979)

Highway One is an album by American jazz vibraphonist Bobby Hutcherson, recorded in 1978 and released on the Columbia label. The album was Hutcherson's first for Columbia after a long association with Blue Note Records.

== Reception ==
Professional ratings
Review scores
Source	Rating
AllMusic	3.5/5 stars
DownBeat	4.5/5 stars

The Bay State Banner noted that "the dynamic, scalar playing of Hutcherson cannot be obscured even by formulistic arrangements and timid writing."

The AllMusic review by Scott Yanow stated: "With keyboardist George Cables and vibraphonist Bobby Hutcherson contributing all of the compositions, it is not too surprising that this LP has plenty of strong melodies... A fine (if not overly adventurous) outing."

== Track listing ==
All compositions by Bobby Hutcherson except as indicated

1. "Secrets of Love" (George Cables) – 8:17
2. "Bouquet" – 6:20
3. "Highway One" – 7:27
4. "Sweet Rita Suite (Part 2 – Her Soul)" (Cables) – 6:09
5. "Circle" (Cables) – 5:00
6. "Secrets of Love (Reprise)" (Todd Barkan, Cables) – 8:32

- Recorded at Wally Heider Studios in San Francisco, California between May 30 and June 23, 1978

== Personnel ==
- Bobby Hutcherson – vibes, arranger
- George Cables – piano, electric piano (tracks 1, 3–6), arranger
- Cedar Walton – piano (track 2), arranger
- James Leary – bass
- Eddie Marshall – drums
- Hubert Laws – flute (tracks 1, 5–6)
- Freddie Hubbard – flugelhorn (track 4)
- Kenneth Nash – percussion (tracks 1, 3, 5–6)
- Jessica Cleaves – vocals (track 6)
- Unnamed strings and brass
