= It's Timeless =

Live album by the Timeless All Stars
- Released: 1982
- Recorded: April 28, 1982
- Venue: Keystone Korner, San Francisco, CA
- Genre: Jazz
- Length: 54:57
- Label: Baystate · Timeless
- Producer: Makoto Kimata

Timeless All Stars chronology
It's Timeless (1982)	Timeless Heart (1983)

Cedar Walton chronology
Heart & Soul (1982)	It's Timeless (1982)	Among Friends (1982)

It's Timeless is a live album by the Timeless All Stars featuring trombonist Curtis Fuller, saxophonist Harold Land, vibraphonist Bobby Hutcherson, and pianist Cedar Walton that was recorded at Keystone Korner in 1982 and released by the Dutch Timeless label.

== Reception ==
Professional ratings
Review scores
Source	Rating
Allmusic	4.5/5 stars

Allmusic reviewer Michael G. Nastos stated: "Live from the Keystone Korner in San Francisco. Definitive group jazz of the '80s".

== Track listing ==
1. Introduction – 1:20
2. "Clockwise" (Cedar Walton) – 10:28
3. "Stella by Starlight" (Victor Young, Ned Washington) – 10:18
4. "Lover Man" (Jimmy Davis, Ram Ramirez, James Sherman) – 5:18
5. "My Foolish Heart" (Young, Washington) – 9:37
6. "Highway One" (Bobby Hutcherson) – 7:57
7. "Arabia" (Curtis Fuller) – 8:35

== Personnel ==
- Curtis Fuller – trombone
- Harold Land – tenor saxophone
- Bobby Hutcherson – vibraphone
- Cedar Walton – piano
- Buster Williams – bass
- Billy Higgins – drums
