= Prelude and Sonata (McCoy Tyner album) =

Studio album by McCoy Tyner
- Released: November 1995
- Recorded: November 26–27, 1994
- Studio: Clinton Recording Studio, New York City
- Genre: Jazz
- Length: 63:42
- Label: Key'stone, Milestone
- Producer: Makoto Kimata, Todd Barkan

McCoy Tyner chronology
Manhattan Moods (1994)	Prelude and Sonata (1995)	Infinity (1995)

Prelude and Sonata is an album by McCoy Tyner released on Key'stone and Milestone label in 1995. It was recorded in November 1994 and has performances of classical and contemporary music by Tyner with the alto saxophonist Antonio Hart, tenor saxophonist Joshua Redman, double bass player Christian McBride and drummer Marvin "Smitty" Smith.

== Reception ==
Professional ratings
Review scores
Source	Rating
AllMusic	4/5 stars
Los Angeles Times	3/4 stars
The Penguin Guide to Jazz Recordings	3/4 stars
The Rolling Stone Jazz & Blues Album Guide	3.5/5 stars
The Virgin Encyclopedia of Jazz	3/5 stars

Peter Watrous of The New York Times included the recording in his list of the top ten jazz albums of 1995, calling it "one of [Tyner's] best albums in years."

The San Diego Union-Tribune's George Varga featured the album in his list of "five of the more memorable albums in [Tyner's] extensive discography," praising both his "eclectic musical choices" and "his talent-rich young band."

In a review for the Los Angeles Times, Don Heckman called the album "impressive," noting that "although the dynamic between Tyner and Redman is very different from that of the classic Tyner-John Coltrane affiliation, each musician seems powerfully (and understandably) stimulated by the responses of the other." However, he described the inclusion of the Beethoven excerpt as a "noticeable misstep... absurdly misconceived."

Writing for AllMusic, Ken Dryden stated that the album "adds a different twist from what one typically expects of the pianist," and commented: "This release is definitely off the beaten path for McCoy Tyner, but it is well worth acquiring."

The authors of The Penguin Guide to Jazz Recordings remarked: "The saxophonists play well, but this kind of session has become a commonplace which Tyner doesn't especially respond to. He plays professionally... without ever getting into his top gear."

== Track listing ==
1. "Prelude in E Minor Op. 28, No. 4" (Frédéric Chopin) - 6:15
2. "Loss of Love" (Henry Mancini, Bob Merrill) - 8:35
3. "Contemplation" (McCoy Tyner) - 11:06
4. "For All We Know" (J. Fred Coots, Sam M. Lewis) - 6:57
5. "I Will Wait for You" (Jacques Demy, Norman Gimbel, Michel Legrand) - 7:04
6. "Soul Eyes" (Mal Waldron) - 6:26
7. "Smile" (Charlie Chaplin) - 6:33
8. "Good Morning Heartache" (Ervin Drake, Dan Fisher, Irene Higginbotham) - 4:16
9. "Piano Sonata No. 8 in C Minor" (Ludwig van Beethoven) - 6:30

- Recorded November 26–27, 1994 at Clinton Recording Studio, New York City

== Personnel ==
- McCoy Tyner - piano
- Antonio Hart - alto saxophone
- Joshua Redman - tenor saxophone (tracks 1, 3 & 4)
- Christian McBride - double bass
- Marvin "Smitty" Smith - drums
