= Montara (album) =

Studio album by Bobby Hutcherson
- Released: 1975
- Recorded: August 12 & 14, 1975
- Genre: Jazz
- Length: 36:11
- Label: Blue Note; BN LA 551
- Producer: Dale Oehler

Bobby Hutcherson chronology
Inner Glow (1975)	Montara (1975)	Waiting (1976)

Montara is an album by American jazz vibraphonist Bobby Hutcherson recorded in 1975 and released on the Blue Note label.

== Reception ==
The Allmusic review by Thom Jurek awarded the album 4 stars stating "Montara is one of the great feel-good jazz albums of the 1970s, one of the great Latin jazz albums of the 1970s, and one of the great groove jazz records. Seek it out without hesitation".

Professional ratings
Review scores
Source	Rating
Allmusic	4/5 stars
The Penguin Guide to Jazz Recordings	3.5/4 stars

== Track listing ==
All compositions by Bobby Hutcherson except as indicated

1. "Camel Rise" (George Cables) - 5:35
2. "Montara" - 4:58
3. "La Malanga (Se Acabo)" (Rudy Calzado) - 4:17
4. "Love Song" (Cables) - 5:37
5. "Little Angel" (Eddie Martinez) - 3:54
6. "Yuyo" - 6:42
7. "Oye Como Va" (Tito Puente) - 5:08

- Recorded at The Record Plant, Los Angeles, California on August 12 & 14, 1975.

== Personnel ==
- Bobby Hutcherson - vibes, marimba
- Oscar Brashear, Blue Mitchell - trumpet
- Plas Johnson - flute
- Ernie Watts, Fred Jackson, Jr. - tenor saxophone, flute
- Eddie Cano - piano
- Larry Nash - electric piano
- Dennis Budimir - guitar
- Chuck Domanico, Dave Troncoso - bass
- Harvey Mason - drums
- Bobby Matos, Johnny Paloma, Victor Pantoja, Ralph MacDonald, Willie Bobo, Rudy Calzado - percussion
- Dale Oehler - arranger
