= Mirage (Bobby Hutcherson album) =

Studio album by Bobby Hutcherson
- Released: 1991
- Recorded: February 15 & 18, 1991
- Studio: BMG Studios, NYC
- Genre: Jazz
- Length: 63:01
- Label: Landmark; LCD 1529
- Producer: Orrin Keepnews

Bobby Hutcherson chronology
Blow Up (1990)	Mirage (1991)	Acoustic Masters II (1994)

Mirage is an album by vibraphonist Bobby Hutcherson featuring performances recorded in 1991 and released on Orrin Keepnews' Landmark label.

== Reception ==
Professional ratings
Review scores
Source	Rating
Allmusic	3/5 stars

On Allmusic, Scott Yanow observed "This quartet date by Bobby Hutcherson works quite well due to the chemistry between the vibist and pianist Tommy Flanagan. ... Everything clicks on this inspired outing".

== Track listing ==
All compositions by Bobby Hutcherson except where noted.

1. "Nascimento" (Barry Harris) – 6:07
2. "Mirage" – 5:46
3. "Beyond the Bluebird" (Tommy Flanagan) – 7:01
4. "Pannonica" (Thelonious Monk) – 7:40
5. "Del Valle" – 7:06
6. "I Am in Love" (Cole Porter) – 7:00
7. "Zingaro" (Antônio Carlos Jobim, Chico Buarque) – 6:27
8. "Ground Work" (Cedar Walton) – 5:23
9. "Love Letters" (Victor Young, Edward Heyman) – 4:02
10. "Heroes" (Billy Childs) – 6:51

== Personnel ==
- Bobby Hutcherson – vibraphone, marimba
- Tommy Flanagan – piano
- Peter Washington – bass (tracks 1–3, 5–8 & 10)
- Billy Drummond – drums (tracks 1–3, 5–8 & 10)
