= Invitation (Joe Sample album) =

Studio album by Joe Sample
- Released: 1993
- Studio: The Power Station (New York City, New York); Schnee Studios (North Hollywood, California)
- Genre: Smooth jazz, standards, third stream
- Length: 49:49
- Label: Warner Bros.
- Producer: Tommy LiPuma

Joe Sample chronology
Collection (1991)	Invitation (1993)	Did You Feel That? (1994)

Professional ratings
Review scores
Source	Rating
AllMusic	4/5 stars

Invitation is a 1993 album by jazz pianist Joe Sample released through Warner Bros. Records. It contains reinterpretations (remakes) of jazz standard compositions written by artists such as Duke Ellington, Johnny Mercer, among others (as listed in parentheses in the track list). Invitation is more of a jazz/classical crossover album with orchestral arrangements by Dale Oehler.

In 1993, Invitation reached No. 1 in the Top Jazz Albums chart and No. 43 in the Top R&B/Hip-Hop Albums chart in Billboard magazine. On the top albums chart, it peaked at No. 194.

== Track listing ==
1. "Black Is the Color" (Traditional folk song) - 3:53
2. "A House Is Not a Home" (Burt Bacharach, Hal David) - 4:57
3. "Come Rain or Come Shine" (Harold Arlen, Johnny Mercer) - 5:07
4. "Invitation" (Bronisław Kaper) - 4:21
5. "Summertime" (George Gershwin, Ira Gershwin, DuBose Heyward, Dorothy Heyward) - 6:49
6. "Nica's Dream" (Horace Silver) - 5:20
7. "Stormy Weather" (Harold Arlen, Ted Koehler) - 5:01
8. "Django" (John Lewis) - 3:45
9. "My One and Only Love" (Guy Wood, Robert Mellin) - 6:12
10. "Mood Indigo" (Duke Ellington, Barney Bigard, Irving Mills) - 4:26

== Personnel ==
- Joe Sample – grand piano, synthesizers, rhythm arrangements
- Larry Williams – synthesizer programming
- Cecil McBee – upright bass
- Victor Lewis – drums
- Lenny Castro – percussion
- Dale Oehler – orchestra arrangements and conductor
- Emile Charlap – orchestra contractor

=== Production ===
- Tommy LiPuma – producer
- Angelo Montrone – assistant producer
- Al Schmitt – recording, mixing
- Chris Albert – second engineer
- Robert Smith – second engineer
- Bruce Miller – additional engineer
- Doug Sax – mastering at The Mastering Lab (Hollywood, California)
- Deborah Silverman-Kern – production coordinator
- Greg Ross – art direction, design
- Tom Tavee – photo portraits
- Douglas Brothers – main photography
- Joe Sample – liner notes
- Patrick Rains & Associates – management

== Chart performance ==
Chart	Peak position
Billboard Top Jazz Albums (1993)	2
