= Almanac (Almanac album) =

Live album by Almanac
- Released: 1977
- Recorded: 1967
- Venue: Columbia University, New York City
- Genre: Jazz
- Length: 32:57
- Label: Improvising Artists; IAI 37.38.51
- Producer: Mike Nock

Almanac is a live album by the jazz ensemble of the same name, featuring pianist Mike Nock, saxophonist and flutist Bennie Maupin, double bassist Cecil McBee, and drummer Eddie Marshall. The group's sole release, it was recorded in 1967 at Columbia University in New York City, and was issued in 1977 by Paul Bley's Improvising Artists label.

== Reception ==
Professional ratings
Review scores
Source	Rating
AllMusic	4/5 stars
The Encyclopedia of Popular Music	3/5 stars

In a review for AllMusic, Scott Yanow noted that "there is enough adventure in the music to hold on to one's interest."

Bill Hart of The Vinyl Press described Almanac as "a stunning album that draws its power from the strength of its performers, compositions that are melodic but adventurous and a recording that is so good that it qualifies as 'demo' material." He commented: "This is a top flight entry into less straight-ahead jazz that can be enjoyed by those just venturing into deeper jazz waters as well as experienced listeners of post-bop styles."

A reviewer for Gramophone called the music "fine," and stated that the album "explores a musical territory between the Miles Davis band of that time and the sort of music Bley had been making for three or so years."

== Track listing ==
"Almanac" composed by Bennie Maupin. Remaining tracks composed by Mike Nock.

1. "Specific Gravity One" – 6:22
2. "Symbiosis" – 5:32
3. "Emotivations" – 4:10
4. "Almanac" – 6:13
5. "Hallucinogen" – 3:42
6. "Double Split" – 3:45
7. "J.C. Dudley" – 2:52

== Personnel ==
- Mike Nock – piano
- Bennie Maupin – flute, tenor saxophone
- Cecil McBee – double bass
- Eddie Marshall – drums
