= Mirrors (Joe Chambers album) =

Studio album by Joe Chambers
- Released: 1999
- Recorded: July 1998
- Genre: Jazz
- Label: Blue Note

Joe Chambers chronology
Isla Verde (1995)	Mirrors (1999)	Urban Grooves (2002)

Mirrors is an album by the American drummer Joe Chambers, released in 1999. Chambers was asked to do the album as part of Blue Note Records' 60th anniversary.

== Production ==
Recorded in July 1998, the album was produced in part by Brian Bacchus. Chambers wrote seven of the nine songs. The group rehearsed the songs for a week and then recorded them in about a day. Eddie Henderson played trumpet on the album; Mulgrew Miller played piano. "Come Back to Me" and "Lady in My Life" are versions of songs made famous by Janet Jackson and Michael Jackson, respectively. Chambers duets with himself on "Circles", playing drums and vibraphone. "Tu-Way-Pock-E-Way" is dedicated to Vernel Fournier.

== Critical reception ==
Professional ratings
Review scores
Source	Rating
AllMusic	4/5 stars
Chicago Sun-Times	3.5/4 stars
The Encyclopedia of Popular Music	3/5 stars
Los Angeles Daily News	3.5/4 stars
The Penguin Guide to Jazz on CD	3.5/4 stars

JazzTimes wrote that "Miller is truly coming into his own, overplaying less and consistently finding an apt line or harmony in the context of the ensemble." The Philadelphia Daily News stated that "Chambers propels a group with an unobtrusive, cymbal-rimmed fuel that leaves plenty of room for the front-line players."

The Toronto Star opined that "Chambers is in subtle charge throughout, forceful and always involved on his slick numbers." The Los Angeles Daily News determined that Mirrors "offers polished, diverse and ear-catching performances of Chambers' varied tunes." The Chicago Sun-Times called Chambers "a masterly all-around talent with a gift for iridescent arrangements and multi-colored harmonies."

AllMusic wrote: "Immaculately played and programmed, collectively inspired by brilliant musicianship, and triggered by the creative juices of its fearless leader, the date commands interest throughout, and upon repeated listenings."

== Track listing ==
No.	Title	Length
1.	"Tu-Way-Pock-E-Way"
2.	"Mirrors"
3.	"Caravanserai"
4.	"Ruth"
5.	"Mariposa"
6.	"Lady in My Life"
7.	"Circles"
8.	"Come Back to Me"
9.	"Ruthless"
