= The Kicker (Bobby Hutcherson album) =

Studio album by Bobby Hutcherson
- Released: 1999
- Recorded: December 29, 1963
- Studio: Van Gelder Studio, Englewood Cliffs, NJ
- Genre: Hard bop
- Length: 53:55
- Label: Blue Note; Blue Note 21437
- Producer: Alfred Lion

Bobby Hutcherson chronology
| Manhattan Moods (1994) | The Kicker (1999) | Little B's Poem (1999) |

The Kicker is an album by the American jazz vibraphonist Bobby Hutcherson, recorded in December 1963 for Blue Note but not released on the label until 1999 as a limited edition. A month earlier, the same musicians recorded guitarist Grant Green's album Idle Moments released in 1965.

== Reception ==
Professional ratings
Review scores
| Source | Rating |
|---|---|
| AllMusic | 4/5 stars |
| The Penguin Guide to Jazz | 3.5/4 stars |

The AllMusic review by Ken Dryden stated: "The first half features the vibraphonist in a cooking hard bop session with Joe Henderson and Duke Pearson, starting with an energetic take on the normally slow ballad 'If Ever I Would Leave You' and a sizzling Hutcherson original, 'For Duke P.' Guitarist Grant Green is added for the second half, beginning with the first recording of Henderson's 'The Kicker', which became well known from its later rendition on Horace Silver's best selling release Song for My Father".

== Track listing ==
1. "If Ever I Would Leave You" (Lerner, Loewe) - 10:33
2. "Mirrors" (Joe Chambers) - 6:52
3. "For Duke P." (Bobby Hutcherson) - 7:54
4. "The Kicker" (Joe Henderson) - 6:07
5. "Step Lightly" (Henderson) - 14:18
6. "Bedouin" (Pearson) - 8:11

== Personnel ==
- Bobby Hutcherson – vibes
- Joe Henderson – tenor saxophone
- Duke Pearson – piano
- Grant Green – guitar (tracks 4–6)
- Bob Cranshaw – bass
- Al Harewood – drums
