= Total Eclipse (Bobby Hutcherson album) =

Studio album by Bobby Hutcherson
- Released: February 1969
- Recorded: July 12, 1968
- Studio: Plaza Sound Studios, New York City
- Genre: Jazz, post-bop, modal jazz
- Length: 40:32
- Label: Blue Note; BST 84291
- Producer: Duke Pearson, Francis Wolff

Bobby Hutcherson chronology
Stick-Up! (1968)	Total Eclipse (1969)	Now! (1970)

Professional ratings
Review scores
Source	Rating
AllMusic	4/5 stars
DownBeat	4/5 stars
The Penguin Guide to Jazz	3/4 stars

Total Eclipse is an album by jazz vibraphonist Bobby Hutcherson, released on the Blue Note label in 1969. It features Hutcherson's first recordings with saxophonist Harold Land, who would become a regular collaborator with Hutcherson throughout the early 1970s. Four of the five tracks are Hutcherson compositions, the exception being Chick Corea's "Matrix".

== Composition and critical reception ==
In a 2013 profile of Hutcherson for Down Beat, Dan Ouellette wrote that Total Eclipse was a "marquee outing for the group, where hard-bop entered into the exploratory zone. The album dips in and out of Hutcherson's daredevil sensibility, with inventive vibe romps and pure elation." Ouellette described Hutcherson's composition "Pompeian" as "a questing voyage with a whimsical open and close and a complex middle section that is avant-leaning and charged as Hutcherson paints dark colors on the marimbas."

"I was experimenting with moving intervals in my playing, doing seconds and thirds to fourths and fifths. It was creating a different sound instead of typical jazz lines. The intervals were opened up. The idea was to try to make it sound simple even though it was music that was hard to figure out. Harold started playing the intervals, too, so that we could bounce off each other. Actually, I got a lot of my ideas from Joe Chambers, who was always trying to change the recipe. 'Pompeian' is full of the intervals playing--which actually reflected the scene that was going on in San Francisco at the time."

— Bobby Hutcherson

AllMusic reviewer Steve Huey agreed that "Pompeian" was an "ambitious piece," but thought that "overall...the album foreshadows Hutcherson's move away from his explicit avant-garde leanings and into a still-advanced but more structured modernist framework. For some reason, Total Eclipse was the only post-bop-styled album Hutcherson and Land recorded together that was released at the time; though they're all high-quality, this remains perhaps the best of the lot." Huey went on to praise Land's playing, writing that his "solo lines are fluid and lengthy, assimilating some of Coltrane's innovations while remaining accessibly soulful" and that his "rounded, echoing tone is a nice contrast for the coolly cerebral post-bop that fills Total Eclipse."

== Track listing ==
All compositions by Hutcherson except as indicated.

1. "Herzog" – 6:36
2. "Total Eclipse" – 8:54
3. "Matrix" (Corea) – 6:44
4. "Same Shame" – 9:28
5. "Pompeian" – 8:50

== Personnel ==
- Bobby Hutcherson – vibraphone, marimba, orchestra bells
- Harold Land – tenor saxophone, flute
- Chick Corea – piano
- Reggie Johnson – bass
- Joe Chambers – drums
