= Almanac (band) =

American jazz band

Almanac was an American jazz ensembe whose members were Bennie Maupin (flute, tenor saxophone), Cecil McBee (bass), Mike Nock (piano) and Eddie Marshall (drums).

== Discography ==
- 1977: Almanac (Improvising Artists)
