= Dialogue (Bobby Hutcherson album) =

Studio album by Bobby Hutcherson
- Released: September 1965
- Recorded: April 3, 1965
- Studio: Van Gelder Studio, Englewood Cliffs, NJ
- Genre: Post-bop, modal jazz, avant-garde jazz
- Length: 45:21
- Label: Blue Note; BST 84198
- Producer: Alfred Lion

Bobby Hutcherson chronology
Dialogue (1965)	Components (1966)

Professional ratings
Review scores
Source	Rating
AllMusic	5/5 stars
Down Beat	3.5/5 stars
The Penguin Guide to Jazz	👑

Dialogue is a studio album by jazz percussionist Bobby Hutcherson, released on the Blue Note label in 1965. This was Hutcherson's first LP released as bandleader (though an earlier session, The Kicker, was released in 1999) following work with Eric Dolphy. The album features four Andrew Hill compositions and two Joe Chambers pieces. It has received widespread critical acclaim and is considered by most critics to be one of Hutcherson's greatest achievements.

== Composition and recording ==
Written in an 8/4 Latin style, the opener, "Catta", is the most conventional piece on the album (as drummer Chambers said in the liner notes; "conventional?"). "Idle While" is a lyrical waltz provided by Chambers. "Les Noirs Marchant", meaning "The Blacks are marching", is a militaristic march using collective improvisation. "Dialogue" displays the influence of free jazz. "Ghetto Lights" was written whilst Hutcherson was at pianist Andrew Hill's house and was inspired by a tune played by Hill's wife, Laverne. As Hutcherson recounted, "some of her tunes had a real ghetto feel". The CD bonus track "Jasper" was originally released on the 1968 album Spiral.

== Reception ==
The Penguin Guide to Jazz awarded Dialogue the maximum four stars, as well as the special "crown" accolade in the first and second editions. According to the authors: "Dialogue stands head and shoulders above [Hutcherson's other Blue Note albums]. Drawing on some of the free-harmonic and -rhythmic innovations developed on Eric Dolphy's Out to Lunch (on which Hutcherson played), he began to develop a complex contrapuntal style that involved parallel melodies rather than unisons and complex rhythmic patterns which he conceived... as focal points round which the musicians operated." AllMusic's Steve Huey gave the album five stars, writing: "Dialogue remains Hutcherson's most adventurous, 'outside' album, and while there are more extensive showcases for his playing, this high-caliber session stands as arguably his greatest musical achievement".

== Track listing ==
1. "Catta" (Andrew Hill) - 7:19
2. "Idle While" (Joe Chambers) - 6:37
3. "Les Noirs Marchant" (Hill) - 6:41
4. "Dialogue" (Chambers) - 9:59
5. "Ghetto Lights" (Hill) - 6:16
6. "Jasper" (Hill) - 8:29 Bonus track on CD reissue

== Personnel ==
- Bobby Hutcherson – vibraphone, marimba (3, 4)
- Sam Rivers – tenor saxophone (1, 6), soprano saxophone (5), bass clarinet (4, 5, 6), flute (2, 3)
- Freddie Hubbard – trumpet
- Andrew Hill – piano
- Richard Davis – double bass
- Joe Chambers – drums
