= Waiting (Bobby Hutcherson album) =

Studio album by Bobby Hutcherson
- Released: 1976; 2013 (CD in Japan)
- Recorded: February 24–26, 1976
- Genre: Jazz
- Label: Blue Note; BN LA 615; TOCJ-50578
- Producer: Dale Oehler

Bobby Hutcherson chronology
Montara (1975)	Waiting (1976)	The View from the Inside (1976)

Waiting is an album by American jazz vibraphonist Bobby Hutcherson recorded in 1976 and released on the Blue Note label. The sessions were released on CD as part of Mosaic Select: Bobby Hutcherson in 2007. The group is tight and well composed throughout the 6 original pieces, allowing Bobby to reach a free, rapidly changing score.

== Reception ==
The Allmusic review awarded the album 3½ stars.

Professional ratings
Review scores
Source	Rating
Allmusic	3.5/5 stars

== Track listing ==
All compositions by Bobby Hutcherson except as indicated

1. "Waiting" (James Leary) - 7:07
2. "Prime Thought" (Leary) - 7:14
3. "Roses Poses" - 6:29
4. "Don't Be Afraid (To Fall in Love Again)" (Leary) - 7:14
5. "Searchin' the Trane" - 9:36
6. "Hangin' Out (With You)" (Leary) - 4:25

- Recorded at Different Fur Studios, San Francisco, California on February 24, 25 & 26, 1976,

== Personnel ==
- Bobby Hutcherson - vibes, marimba
- Emanuel Boyd - tenor saxophone, soprano saxophone, flute
- George Cables - piano
- James Leary III - bass
- Eddie Marshall - drums
- Kenneth Nash - percussion
