= Knucklebean =

Studio album by Bobby Hutcherson
- Released: 1977
- Recorded: March 1 & 3, 1977
- Genre: Jazz
- Label: Blue Note; BN-LA789-H
- Producer: Dale Oehler

Bobby Hutcherson chronology
The View from the Inside (1977)	Knucklebean (1977)	Highway One (1978)

Knucklebean is an album by jazz vibraphone and marimba player Bobby Hutcherson. It was released in 1977 by Blue Note Records. The musicians were Hutcherson's regular band plus guests Freddie Hubbard and Hadley Caliman.

== Critical reception ==
Professional ratings
Review scores
Source	Rating
AllMusic	4/5 stars

The Bay State Banner wrote that "Hutch doesn't lack for solo time in which he skitters, pinpoints, breezes, and hums as his fancy inclines; but we also hear Freddie Hubbard's muted trumpet (as in 'Little B's Poem') sounding flaky and critical."

== Track listing ==
A1. "Why Not"(George Cables) – 5:22
A2. "Sundance Knows" (Eddie Marshall) – 6:34
A3. "So Far, So Good" (James Leary) – 4:39
B1. "Little B's Poem" (Bobby Hutcherson) – 4:43
B2. "'Til Then" (Hutcherson) – 4:05
B3. "Knucklebean" (Marshall) – 7:12

== Personnel ==
- Bobby Hutcherson – vibraphone, marimba
- Freddie Hubbard – trumpet
- George Cables – acoustic and electric piano
- Manny Boyd – flute, soprano and tenor saxophone
- Hadley Caliman – flute and tenor saxophone
- James Leary – bass
- Eddie Marshall – drums
