= Conception: The Gift of Love =

Studio album by Bobby Hutcherson
- Released: 1979
- Recorded: March 15–16, 1979
- Studio: A&R Recording Studios, NYC and Van Gelder Studio, Englewood Cliffs, NJ
- Genre: Jazz
- Length: 37:52
- Label: Columbia; JC 35814
- Producer: Cedar Walton

Bobby Hutcherson chronology
Spiral (1979)	Conception: The Gift of Love (1979)	Patterns (1980)

Conception: The Gift of Love is an album by American jazz vibraphonist Bobby Hutcherson, recorded in 1979 and released on the Columbia label.

== Reception ==
Professional ratings
Review scores
Source	Rating
AllMusic	2.5/5 stars
The Virgin Encyclopedia of Jazz	3/5 stars

The Bay State Banner wrote that "Hutcherson plays such forceful, intense and rhythmic vibes, that he breathes life into the ho-hum compositions."

The AllMusic review by Scott Yanow stated: "This is one of his lesser efforts... Although well played and reasonably challenging, nothing all that memorable occurs".

== Track listing ==
All compositions by Bobby Hutcherson except where noted

1. "No Siree Bob" - 7:00
2. "Clockwise" (Cedar Walton) - 6:39
3. "Remember to Smile" (James Leary) - 5:38
4. "Dark Side, Light Side" (George Cables) - 4:06
5. "Hold My Hand" (Leary) - 3:58
6. "Dreamin'" (Eddie Marshall) - 6:07
7. "Quiet Fire" (Cables) - 4:24

== Personnel ==
- Bobby Hutcherson - vibes
- George Cables - piano
- Jon Faddis, Danny Moore, Anthony Tooley, Joseph B. Wilder - trumpet
- Robert Alexander, John Gale, Urbie Green - tenor trombone
- Hubert Laws - flute
- Romeo Pinque - bassoon, bass clarinet
- Lenny Hambro - alto saxophone
- Daniel Trimboli, Frank Wess - tenor saxophone
- James Leary - bass
- Eddie Marshall - drums
- Bill Summers, Kenneth Nash - percussion
