= The Almoravid =

Studio album by Joe Chambers
- Released: 1974
- Recorded: February 10, 1971, October 8, 1973 and November 1, 1973
- Genre: Jazz
- Length: 37:52
- Label: Muse MR 5035
- Producer: Don Schlitten and Joe Chambers

Joe Chambers chronology
The Almoravid (1974)	New World (1976)

The Almoravid is the debut album led by drummer Joe Chambers recorded in 1971 and 1973 and released on the Muse label.

== Reception ==
Professional ratings
Review scores
Source	Rating
AllMusic	3.5/5 stars

In his review for AllMusic, Scott Yanow stated "In most cases, the leader's drums and the percussionists are in the forefront, the individual selections have weak themes and, although the complex rhythms are intriguing, the music is not all that memorable. Perhaps if the selections had been programmed as a suite or if there was some logical development from tune to tune, then this well-intentioned effort would have been more successful."

== Track listing ==
All compositions by Joe Chambers except as indicated

1. "The Almoravid" - 7:53
2. "Early Minor" (Joe Zawinul) - 6:50
3. "Gazelle Suite" - 3:37
4. "Catta" (Andrew Hill) - 4:51
5. "Medina" - 8:24
6. "Jihad" - 6:17

Recorded February 10, 1971 (#2, 5); October 8, 1973 (#1, 4); November 1, 1973 (#3, 6).

== Personnel ==
- Joe Chambers - drums
- Woody Shaw - trumpet (tracks 2 & 5)
- Garnett Brown - trombone (tracks 2 & 5)
- Harold Vick - tenor saxophone, flute (tracks 2 & 5)
- Cedar Walton - piano, electric piano (tracks 1 & 4)
- George Cables - electric piano (tracks 2 & 5)
- Cecil McBee - bass (tracks 2 & 5)
- Walter Booker (tracks 3 & 6), Richard Davis (tracks 1 & 4), - electric bass
- Omar Clay (tracks 1, 3, 4 & 6), David Friedman (tracks 1 & 4), Doug Hawthorne (tracks 3 & 6) - marimba, percussion
- Ray Mantilla - congas, percussion (tracks 1, 3, 4 & 6)
