= Enjoy the View =

Studio album by Bobby Hutcherson
- Released: June 24, 2014
- Studio: Ocean Way Studios, Hollywood, CA
- Genre: Contemporary jazz
- Length: 43:29
- Label: Blue Note; B001977902
- Producer: Don Was

Bobby Hutcherson chronology
Somewhere in the Night (2012)	Enjoy the View (2014)

Professional ratings
Review scores
Source	Rating
Allmusic	4/5 stars

Enjoy the View is an album by American jazz vibraphone and marimba player Bobby Hutcherson. The record was released on June 24, 2014 via the Blue Note label and was Hutcherson's final studio album released before his death on August 15, 2016.

== Track listing ==
No.	Title	Writer(s)	Length
1.	"Delia"	David Sanborn	5:51
2.	"Don Is"	Joey DeFrancesco	5:02
3.	"Hey Harold"	Bobby Hutcherson	7:02
4.	"Little Flower"	David Sanborn	6:43
5.	"Montara"	Bobby Hutcherson	5:40
6.	"Teddy"	Bobby Hutcherson	5:08
7.	"You"	Joey DeFrancesco	8:03
Total length:			43:29

== Personnel ==
- Bobby Hutcherson – vibraphone
- David Sanborn – alto saxophone
- Joey DeFrancesco – trumpet, organ
- Billy Hart – drums
