= Something Tasty =

Studio album by The Super Jazz Trio
- Released: 1979
- Recorded: May 25, 1979
- Studios: Media Studio, Tokyo
- Genre: Jazz
- Label: Baystate

Tommy Flanagan chronology
Together (1978)	Something Tasty (1979)	Super-Session (1980)

Something Tasty is an album by the Super Jazz Trio of pianist Tommy Flanagan, bassist Reggie Workman, and drummer Joe Chambers, with Art Farmer on flugelhorn.

== Background ==
The Super Jazz Trio was formed in 1978 by pianist Tommy Flanagan, bassist Reggie Workman, and drummer Joe Chambers.

== Music and recording ==
The album was recorded at Media Studio, Tokyo, on May 25, 1979.

== Releases ==
It was released by the Japanese label Baystate. An SHM-CD edition was released on February 25, 2009, by BMG Japan.

== Track listing ==
1. "Au Privave" – 6:28
2. "Blame It on My Youth" – 7:34
3. "My Heart Skips a Beat" – 6:00
4. "Here's That Rainy Day" – 5:53
5. "Stablemates" – 6:18
6. "It Might as Well Be Spring" – 9:45

== Personnel ==
- Art Farmer – flugelhorn
- Tommy Flanagan – piano
- Reggie Workman – bass
- Joe Chambers – drums
