= Kristin Korb =

American jazz double bassist and vocalist

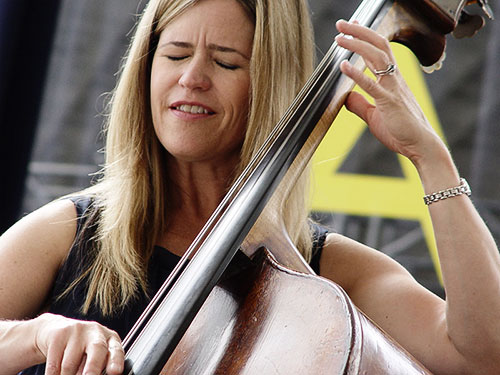
- Kristin Korb at Aarhus Jazz Festival, Denmark (2014)

Background information
- Born: Montana, U.S.
- Genres: Jazz
- Occupations: Musician, vocalist
- Instrument: Double bass
- Years active: 1995–present
- Website: www.kristinkorb.com

Kristin Korb is an American jazz double bassist and vocalist.

== Biography ==
Korb studied at Eastern Montana College and the University of California, San Diego. She also studied with Ray Brown, with whom she made her recording debut, released in 1996.

Since moving to Los Angeles in 2002, she has performed across North America. She taught at Azuza Pacific and University Southern California, where she was coordinator of vocal jazz studies. After getting married in July 2011 to a Dane, Morten Stove, co-founder of DPA Microphones, she moved to Copenhagen, Denmark.

She has performed and recorded with jazz artists such as Llew Matthews, Kim Richmond, Steve Barnes, Ray Brown, Jeff Hamilton, Bruce Forman, Sheila Jordan, Jan Lundgren, Alex Riel, Harry Allen, Aaron Serfaty, Otmaro Ruíz, Mary Fettig, Karl-Martin Almqvist, Mathias Heise and Jacob Fischer. She plays in a Trio with Snorre Kirk on drums and Magnus Hjorth on piano.

== Discography ==
- Introducing Kristin Korb with Ray Brown (Telarc, 1996)
- Where You'll Find Me (Double K Music, 2001)
- Why Can't You Behave (Double K Music, 2006)
- Get Happy with Todd Johnson (Grace Base, 2006)
- In the Meantime (Double K Music, 2009)
- What's Your Story (Double K Music, 2013)
- Finding Home (Double K Music, 2014)
- That Time of Year (Storyville, 2018)
- What If? / Why Not? (Double K Music, 2021)
