= Super-Session (Tommy Flanagan album) =

Studio album by Tommy Flanagan, Red Mitchell and Elvin Jones
- Released: 1980
- Recorded: February 4, 1980
- Studios: Sound Ideas, New York City
- Genre: Straight-ahead jazz
- Length: 36:46
- Labels: Enja; 3059
- Producers: Horst Weber, Matthias Winckelmann

Tommy Flanagan chronology
Something Tasty (1979)	Super-Session (1980)	The Standard (1980)

Super-Session is an album by pianist Tommy Flanagan, bassist Red Mitchell, and drummer Elvin Jones, recorded in 1980 for the Enja label.

== Reception ==
Professional ratings
Review scores
Source	Rating
AllMusic	3/5 stars
The Penguin Guide to Jazz	3.5/4 stars

AllMusic awarded the album 3 stars, stating that "the musicians communicate quite well (Flanagan and Jones had played together back in the mid-'50s in Detroit) and often think as one. Fine straight-ahead music."

== Track listing ==
All compositions by Tommy Flanagan except where noted.

1. "Django" (John Lewis) – 6:05
2. "Minor Perhaps" – 6:43
3. "Too Late Now" (Burton Lane) – 9:38
4. "I Love You" (Cole Porter) – 7:03
5. "Rachel's Rondo" – 6:03
6. "Things Ain't What They Used to Be" (Mercer Ellington, Ted Persons) – 6:24

== Personnel ==
- Tommy Flanagan – piano
- Red Mitchell – bass
- Elvin Jones – drums
