= Un Poco Loco (album) =

Studio album by Bobby Hutcherson
- Released: 1980
- Recorded: 1979
- Studio: A&M (Hollywood, California)
- Genre: Jazz
- Length: 37:22
- Label: Columbia
- Producer: Dale Oehler

Bobby Hutcherson chronology
Inner Glow (1980)	Un Poco Loco (1980)	Solo / Quartet (1982)

Un Poco Loco is an album by American jazz vibraphonist Bobby Hutcherson, recorded in 1979 and released on the Columbia label. The album was Hutcherson's last for Columbia.

== Reception ==
Professional ratings
Review scores
Source	Rating
AllMusic	4/5 stars
The Penguin Guide to Jazz Recordings	3/4 stars
The Rolling Stone Jazz Record Guide	4/5 stars

The Boston Globe called Un Poco Loco "an LP that takes on a spareness usually associated with the ECM school of production—not surprisingly, since ECM artist, guitarist John Abercrombie is prominent on several tracks."

The AllMusic review by Scott Yanow stated that "vibraphonist Bobby Hutcherson had evolved from a member of the avant-garde into a top exponent of the modern mainstream... This excellent album features Hutcherson with a top notch all-star group".

== Track listing ==
All compositions by Bobby Hutcherson except as indicated

1. "The Sailor's Song" (Steve George, John Lang, Jerry Manfedi, Richard Page) - 4:43
2. "Silver Hollow" (Jack DeJohnette) - 4:10
3. "Un Poco Loco" (Bud Powell) - 8:21
4. "Love Song" (George Cables) - 4:38
5. "Ivory Coast" (Red Young) - 4:29
6. "Ebony Moonbeams" (Cables) - 7:09
7. "I Wanna Stand over There" - 3:52

== Personnel ==
- Bobby Hutcherson – vibes, marimba
- Dale Oehler – arranger
- George Cables – piano
- John Abercrombie – guitar
- Chuck Domanico – bass, electric bass
- Peter Erskine – drums
