= Bruce Forman =

American jazz guitarist

- Born: May 14, 1956 (age 68); Springfield, Massachusetts, U.S.
- Genres: Jazz
- Occupation: Musician
- Instrument: Guitar
- Labels: Muse, Concord Jazz
- Website: bruceforman.com

Bruce Forman (born 1956) is an American jazz guitarist.

Forman took piano lessons at an early age before picking up the guitar at age thirteen. In 1971, his family moved to San Francisco, where he led his own groups in the area and performed with local jazz musicians, such as Eddie Duran, Vince Lateano, and Eddie Marshall, and with nationally known musicians, such as Ray Brown, George Cables, Joe Henderson, Freddie Hubbard, Bobby Hutcherson, and Woody Shaw. He also performed regularly at the Monterey Jazz Festival. He played with Richie Cole from 1978 to 1982. His most successful album as a leader was 1992's Forman on the Job, which hit #14 on the U.S. Billboard Top Jazz Albums chart. Forman has appeared on several film scores composed by Clint Eastwood, including Million Dollar Baby.

== Discography ==
=== As leader ===
- Coast to Coast (Choice, 1981)
- River Journey (Muse, 1981)
- 20/20 (Muse, 1982)
- In Transit (Muse, 1983)
- Full Circle (Concord Jazz, 1984)
- The Bash (Muse, 1985)
- Dynamics with George Cables (Concord Jazz, 1985)
- There Are Times (Concord Jazz, 1987)
- Pardon Me! (Concord Jazz, 1989)
- Still of the Night (Kamei, 1991)
- Forman on the Job with Joe Henderson (Kamei, 1992)
- The Sound of Music with Michele Weir (Weirforman/CD Baby, 2003)
- Dedication: Bootleg, Vol. 1 (Blujazz, 2003)
- Formanism (B4Man Music, 2012)
- The Book of Forman: Formanism, Volume II (B4Man Music, 2015)
- Junkyard Duo (B4Man Music, 2018)
- Reunion! (B4Man Music, 2021)

=== With Cow Bop ===
- Swingin' Out West (Blujazz, 2004)
- Route 66 (Blujazz, 2008)
- Too Hick for the Room (B4Man Music, 2011)
- Cowlifornia Swing (B4man Music, 2012)

=== As sideman ===
With Richie Cole

- Hollywood Madness (Muse, 1980)
- Tokyo Madness (Seven Seas, 1981)
- Alive! at the Village Vanguard (Muse, 1982)
- Some Things Speak for Themselves (Muse, 1983)
- Alto Annie's Theme (Palo Alto, 1983)
- The Man with the Horn (Jazz Excursion, 2007)

With others

- Lorez Alexandria, Star Eyes (Muse, 1996)
- Ray Brown, Some of My Best Friends Are...Guitarists (Telarc, 2002)
- Chuck Deardorf, Transparence (Origin, 2011)
- Les DeMerle, You're the Bop! A Jazz Portrait (Summit, 2001)
- Bobby Enriquez & Richie Cole, The Wildman Meets the Madman (GNP Crescendo, 1982)
- Dave Eshelman, Deep Voices (Sea Breeze, 1988)
- Carey Frank, Something To Remember Him By (CFM/CD Baby, 2017)
- Johnny Griffin & Richie Cole, Jazz Life Vol. 1 (Storyville, 2003)
- Tom Harrell, Play of Light (Blackhawk, 1986)
- Dan Hicks, Tangled Tales (Surfdog, 2009)
- Dan Hicks, Live at Davies (Surfdog, 2013)
- Bobby Hutcherson, Ambos Mundos (Landmark, 1989)
- Roger Kellaway, Remembering Bobby Darin (IPO, 2004)
- Roger Kellaway, Heroes (IPO, 2006)
- Jimmy Knepper, 1st Place (Blackhawk, 1986)
- Kristin Korb, What's Your Story (Double K Music, 2013)
- Tony Monaco, East to West (Summit, 2006)
- Lanny Morgan, It's About Time (Palo Alto, 1985)
- Geoff Muldaur, The Secret Handshake (Shout!, 1998)
- Mark Murphy, Bop for Kerouac (Muse, 1981)
- Rare Silk, New Weave (Polydor, 1983)
- Mike Richmond, New Blues (Nuba/Karonte, 1993)
- Molly Ringwald, Except Sometimes (Concord, 2013)
- Ilya Serov, Back in Time (Silky Sound, 2018)
- Charlie Shoemake, Uncrowned Kings (Chase, 1999)
- Charlie Shoemake, Vibes Master (Chase, 2003)
