= Wise One =

Wise One may refer to:

- "Wise One", a song by John Coltrane from his 1964 album Crescent
- Wise One, a concept in the Wheel of Time
- "Wise One", a Bobby Hutcherson album
