= Finite Records =

Jazz record label

Finite Records was a private jazz record label which released about five records in the late 1970s.

Drummer John Lewis is involved in three of the albums. Lewis can be heard on the Strata-East Records releases The Waterbearers and Handscapes 2.

== Discography ==
Year	Artist	Album	Personnel
1976	John Lewis	Traveling with the John Lewis Sound	Alex Foster, Paul Metzke, Karen Joseph, Bob Sardo, John Blair
1976	Joe Chambers	New World	Herb Bushler, Ray Mantilla, Eddie Martinez, Paul Metzke, Omar Clay, Dick Meza
1976	Alex Foster, John Lewis	Transaxdrum	duo
1977	Rita da Costa	Meets the Cedar Walton Trio	Cedar Walton, Herman Wright
1978	Sonny Stitt	The Sonny Stitt Quintet	Hugh Lawson, John Lewis, Ronnie Boykins, Sam Bivens
