= Bebop & Beyond =

American jazz tribute band

Bebop & Beyond is a jazz tribute bebop ensemble led by saxophonist Mel Martin.

Bebop and Beyond features Martin, George Cables, Warren Gale, John Handy, Eddie Marshall, Frank Tusa.

Plays Dizzy Gillespie features Martin, Vince Lateano, George Cables, Donald Bailey and Gillespie himself.

== Discography ==
- Bebop and Beyond (1983, Concord Jazz)
- Plays Thelonious Monk (1990, Bluemoon Records)
- Plays Dizzy Gillespie (1991, Bluemoon)
