= The Standard (Tommy Flanagan album) =

Studio album by The Super Jazz Trio
- Released: 1980
- Recorded: February 14, 1980
- Studio: The Power Station, New York City
- Genre: Jazz
- Length: 41:21
- Label: Baystate
- Producer: Fumimaru Kawaashima, Yoshio Ozawa

Tommy Flanagan chronology
Super-Session (1980)	The Standard (1980)	You're Me (1980)

The Standard is an album by The Super Jazz Trio: pianist Tommy Flanagan, bassist Reggie Workman and drummer Joe Chambers.

== Background ==
The Super Jazz Trio was formed in 1978 by pianist Tommy Flanagan, bassist Reggie Workman and drummer Joe Chambers.

== Music and recording ==
The album was recorded at The Power Station in New York City on February 14, 1980.

== Releases ==
The Standard was released by the Japanese label Baystate. It was The Super Jazz Trio's final recording.

== Track listing ==
1. "Softly, as in a Morning Sunrise" (Oscar Hammerstein II, Sigmund Romberg) – 6:18
2. "Night in Tunisia" (Dizzy Gillespie, Frank Paparelli) – 6:16
3. "Someday My Prince Will Come" (Frank Churchill, Larry Morey) – 8:04
4. "Autumn Leaves" (Joseph Kosma, Johnny Mercer, Jacques Prévert) – 8:31
5. "It's All Right with Me" (Cole Porter) – 3:26
6. "Angel Eyes" (Earl Brent, Matt Dennis) – 6:11
7. "Straight, No Chaser" (Thelonious Monk) – 2:35

== Personnel ==
- Tommy Flanagan – piano
- Reggie Workman – bass
- Joe Chambers – drums
