= Timeless Heart =

Studio album by the Timeless All Stars
- Released: 1983
- Recorded: April 8, 1983
- Studio: Van Gelder Studio, Englewood Cliffs, NJ
- Genre: Jazz
- Length: 40:26
- Label: Baystate · Timeless
- Producer: Wim Wigt

Timeless All Stars chronology
It's Timeless (1982)	Timeless Heart (1983)	Essence (1986)

Cedar Walton chronology
Among Friends (1982)	Timeless All Stars (1983)	Eastern Rebellion 4 (1983)

Timeless Heart is an album by the Timeless All Stars featuring trombonist Curtis Fuller, saxophonist Harold Land, vibraphonist Bobby Hutcherson, and pianist Cedar Walton that was recorded in 1983 and released by the Dutch Timeless label.

== Reception ==
Professional ratings
Review scores
Source	Rating
Allmusic	4/5 stars

Allmusic awarded the album 4 stars, stating: "All star sextet with auspicious beginnings ... A bright, clean, happy sound. Extension of MJQ".

== Track listing ==
All compositions by Cedar Walton except where noted

1. "Hindsight" – 5:43
2. "Tayamisha" (Buster Williams) – 5:59
3. "Hand in Glove" – 5:20
4. "Fiesta Espagnol" – 7:38
5. "World Peace" (Harold Land) – 6:07
6. "Christina" (Williams) – 4:04

== Personnel ==
- Curtis Fuller – trombone
- Harold Land – tenor saxophone
- Bobby Hutcherson – vibraphone
- Cedar Walton – piano
- Buster Williams – bass
- Billy Higgins – drums
