= Spiral (Bobby Hutcherson album) =

1868 studio album by Bobby Hutcherson (releaswd in 1979)

Studio album by Bobby Hutcherson
- Released: 1979
- Recorded: April 3, 1965; November 11, 1968
- Studio: Van Gelder Studio, Englewood Cliffs, NJ
- Genre: Post-bop
- Length: 36:38
- Label: Blue Note; LT 996
- Producer: Michael Cuscuna, Duke Pearson, Francis Wolff, Alfred Lion

Bobby Hutcherson chronology
Oblique (1979)	Spiral (1979)	Conception: The Gift of Love (1979)

Professional ratings
Review scores
Source	Rating
Allmusic	4/5 stars
The Rolling Stone Jazz Record Guide	4/5 stars

Spiral is an album by jazz vibraphonist Bobby Hutcherson. It was released in 1979 on Blue Note Records (LT 996) featuring six tracks recorded in November, 1968, except for "Jasper", recorded in April 1965 and later added to the CD reissue of Dialogue, since it was recorded the same day. The first five tracks of Spiral may also be found on the CD reissue of Medina.

== Track listing ==
1. "Ruth" (Chambers) – 7:52
2. "The Wedding March" (Cowell) – 3:54
3. "Poor People's March" (Land) – 6:18
4. "Spiral" (Chambers) – 6:15
5. "Visions" (Hutcherson) – 3:50
6. "Jasper" (Andrew Hill) – 8:29

== Personnel ==
Musician of tracks 1–5 (November 1968)

- Bobby Hutcherson – vibraphone, marimba
- Joe Chambers – drums
- Harold Land – saxophone
- Stanley Cowell – piano
- Reggie Johnson – bass

Musicians of track 6 (April 1965)

- Bobby Hutcherson – vibraphone, marimba
- Joe Chambers – drums
- Andrew Hill – piano
- Freddie Hubbard – trumpet
- Sam Rivers – tenor sax, bass clarinet
- Richard Davis – bass

Producers

- Michael Cuscuna – produced for release
- Duke Pearson – producer of tracks 1–5
- Francis Wolff – producer of tracks 1–5
- Alfred Lion – producer of track 6
