= Blow Up (Bobby Hutcherson album) =

Live album by Bobby Hutcherson Harold Land Quintet
- Released: 1990
- Recorded: July 25, 1969
- Venue: Jazz à Juan, Juan-les-Pins
- Genre: Post-bop
- Length: 56:18
- Label: Jazz Music Yesterday; JMY 1005-2

Bobby Hutcherson chronology
| Ambos Mundos (1989) | Blow Up (1990) | Mirage (1991) |

Harold Land chronology
| Topology (1984) | Blow Up (1990) | A Lazy Afternoon (1995) |

Blow Up is a live album by jazz vibraphonist Bobby Hutcherson and tenor saxophonist Harold Land, released on the Jazz Music Yesterday label.

== Composition ==
"We were all embracing the political content of the music, versus issuing the traditional and conventional...Our approaches varied. We used sounds prevalent at the time and played in a free form. Our resources were expanded as we set out to re-examine the music. The apex for me came at a concert we had in Antibes. There were great moments at that show where we combined pulses with a great deal of freedom within a fixed form. Bobby was doing these incredible cadenzas."

— Stanley Cowell

== Track listing ==
1. "Spiral" (Chambers) - 13:40
2. "Blow-Up" (Herbie Hancock) - 14:32
3. "Herzog" (Hutcherson) - 14:30
4. "Maiden Voyage" (Hancock) - 11:40
5. "Man on Mercury" (Land) - 1:56

== Personnel ==
- Bobby Hutcherson - vibraphone
- Harold Land - tenor saxophone
- Stanley Cowell - piano
- Reggie Johnson - bass
- Joe Chambers - drums
