= Cruisin' the 'Bird =

Studio album by Bobby Hutcherson
- Released: 1988
- Recorded: April 15–16, 1988
- Studio: Fantasy Studios, Berkeley CA
- Genre: Jazz
- Length: 51:55 CD release with additional track
- Label: Landmark; LLP/LCD 1517
- Producer: Orrin Keepnews

Bobby Hutcherson chronology
Farewell Keystone (1988)	Cruisin' the 'Bird (1988)	Ambos Mundos (1989)

Cruisin' the 'Bird is an album by vibraphonist Bobby Hutcherson featuring performances recorded in 1988 and released on Orrin Keepnews' Landmark label.

== Reception ==
Professional ratings
Review scores
Source	Rating
Allmusic	4/5 stars

On Allmusic, Scott Yanow observed "Throughout his career, vibraphonist Bobby Hutcherson has recorded one rewarding set after another, always being quite consistent. ... Fine music".

== Track listing ==
All compositions by Bobby Hutcherson except where noted.

1. "All or Nothing at All" (Arthur Altman, Jack Lawrence) – 6:48
2. "Cruisin' the 'Bird" – 6:09
3. "Sierra" – 8:33
4. "If You Do" – 6:45 additional track on CD release
5. "Imminent Treasures" – 6:39
6. "Chelsea Bridge" (Billy Strayhorn) – 5:08
7. "Come Rain or Come Shine" (Harold Arlen, Johnny Mercer) – 6:11
8. "On the Delta" – 5:42

== Personnel ==
- Bobby Hutcherson – vibraphone, marimba
- Ralph Moore – soprano saxophone, tenor saxophone
- Buddy Montgomery - piano
- Rufus Reid – bass
- Victor Lewis – drums
