= Acoustic Masters II =

Studio album by Bobby Hutcherson, Craig Handy, Lenny White and Jerry González
- Released: 1994
- Recorded: March 1993
- Studio: Sound on Sound Studios, NYC
- Genre: Jazz
- Length: 51:53
- Label: Atlantic; 82591-2
- Producer: Lenny White

Bobby Hutcherson chronology
Mirage (1991)	Acoustic Masters II (1994)	Manhattan Moods (1994)

Acoustic Masters II is an album by vibraphonist Bobby Hutcherson, saxophonist Craig Handy, drummer Lenny White and trumpeter Jerry González featuring performances recorded in 1993 and released the following year on the Atlantic label.

== Reception ==
Professional ratings
Review scores
Source	Rating
Allmusic	4/5 stars

On Allmusic, Scott Yanow observed "An all-star group was gathered together during a short-time revival of the Atlantic label's interest in jazz. ... The music falls between hard bop and post-bop, clearly inspiring and challenging the players even though none of the songs eventually became standards. Well worth searching for".

== Track listing ==
1. "8/4 Beat" (Bobby Hutcherson) – 5:22
2. "Concrete Blues" (Craig Handy) – 8:25
3. "Pablo" (Jane Getter, Lenny White) – 7:33
4. "Little Waltz" (Ron Carter) – 5:32
5. "Wayne's World" (Handy) – 6:16
6. "Second Thoughts" (Mulgrew Miller) – 5:13
7. "I Don't Know Why" (White) – 5:30
8. "Stumblin'" (White) – 3:10
9. "When I Fall in Love" (Victor Young, Edward Heyman) – 4:52

== Personnel ==
- Bobby Hutcherson – vibraphone
- Craig Handy – tenor saxophone, soprano saxophone, flute
- Lenny White – drums
- Jerry González – trumpet, flugelhorn
- Mulgrew Miller - piano
- Ron Carter – bass
