= Cirrus (album) =

Studio album by Bobby Hutcherson
- Released: 1974; 2013 (CD in Japan)
- Recorded: April 17–18, 1974
- Genre: Jazz
- Length: 39:45
- Label: Blue Note; BN LA 257; TOCJ-50539
- Producer: George Butler

Bobby Hutcherson chronology
Bobby Hutcherson Live at Montreux (1973)	Cirrus (1974)	Linger Lane (1975)

Cirrus is an album by American jazz vibraphonist Bobby Hutcherson recorded in 1974 and released on the Blue Note label.

== Reception ==
The Allmusic review by Stephen Thomas Erlewine awarded the album 4 stars and stated "While it doesn't quite match the heights of their early collaborations, Cirrus finds Bobby Hutcherson resuming his partnership with tenor saxophonist Harold Land, and the results are quite good... The music is a little smoother than their earlier collaborations, but there are enough captivating, provocative moments to make the reunion a success".

Professional ratings
Review scores
Source	Rating
Allmusic	4/5 stars

== Track listing ==
All compositions by Bobby Hutcherson except as indicated

1. "Rosewood" (Woody Shaw) - 7:40
2. "Even Later" - 8:56
3. "Wrong or Right" - 7:26
4. "Zuri Dance" - 8:25
5. "Cirrus" - 7:18
- Recorded at Wally Heider Sound Studio III, Los Angeles, California on April 17 (track 4) and April 18 (tracks 1–3 & 5), 1974.

== Personnel ==
- Bobby Hutcherson - vibes, marimba
- Woody Shaw - trumpet
- Emanuel Boyd, Harold Land - tenor saxophone, flute
- William Henderson - piano, electric piano
- Ray Drummond - bass
- Larry Hancock - drums
- Kenneth Nash - percussion
