= New World (Joe Chambers album) =

Studio album by Joe Chambers
- Released: 1976
- Recorded: 1976 at Minot Sound in White Plains, New York
- Genre: Jazz
- Label: Finite FIN-1976-2
- Producer: John Lewis and Jack Saracco

Joe Chambers chronology
The Almoravid (1974)	New World (1976)	Double Exposure (1977)

New World is the second album led by drummer Joe Chambers recorded in 1976 and released on the short-lived Finite label.

== Background ==
The record was released on Octave NPCC-1143 in 2018.

== Reception ==
Professional ratings
Review scores
Source	Rating
AllMusic	4/5 stars

The review for AllMusic stated "Chambers excels in hard bop, avant-garde, soul-jazz, and fusion contexts, and New World is proof positive of that fact."

== Track listing ==
All compositions by Joe Chambers except as indicated

1. "New World" - 8:32
2. "Chung Dynasty" (Omar Clay) - 4:08
3. "Rio" (Wayne Shorter) - 6:35
4. "Blow Up" (Herbie Hancock) - 7:28
5. "Rock Pile" - 5:56

== Personnel ==
- Joe Chambers - drums, marimba, vibraphone
- Dick Meza - tenor saxophone, soprano saxophone
- Edy Martinez - electric piano
- Paul Metzke - guitar
- Herb Bushler - bass
- Omar Clay - percussion
- Ray Mantilla - congas, Latin percussion
