= Collection (Joe Sample album) =

Compilation album by Joe Sample
- Released: 1991
- Genre: Crossover Jazz, smooth jazz, fusion
- Length: 51:57
- Label: GRP
- Producer: Joseph Doughney, Wilton Felder, Carl Griffin, Stix Hooper, Joe Sample

Joe Sample chronology
Ashes To Ashes (1990)	Collection (1991)	Invitation (1993)

Professional ratings
Review scores
Source	Rating
AllMusic	3/5 stars

Collection is a compilation album of jazz songs by American pianist Joe Sample that was released in 1991 through GRP Records.

This album sampler includes tracks from albums released in 1978-1985 while Joe Sample recorded with Blue Thumb and MCA recording companies.

== Track listing ==
All tracks by Joe Sample except where noted.

1. "Carmel" – 5:39
2. "Woman You're Driving Me Mad" – 6:12
3. "A Rainy Day in Monterey" – 5:42
4. "Sunrise" – 5:22
5. "There Are Many Stops Along The Way" – 4:41
6. "Rainbow Seeker" – 5:25
7. "Fly With the Wings Of Love" – 7:36
8. "Burnin' Up The Carnival" (Will Jennings, Sample) (featuring Flora Purim) – 7:19
9. "Night Flight" (Special Radio Edit) – 4:59
10. "Oasis" – 5:03

== Personnel ==
- Andy Baltimore – Director, Creative Director
- Russ Bracher – Engineer, Assistant Engineer
- Garnett Brown – Trombone
- Lenny Castro – Percussion
- Leon "Ndugu" Chancler – Drums, Timbales, Producer, Linn Drum
- F. Byron Clark – Engineer, Mixing
- Paulinho Da Costa – Percussion
- Jay Deversa – Trumpet
- Joseph Doughney – Producer, Post Production
- Nathan East – Bass
- Edward Sonny Emory – Drums
- David Ervin – Synthesizer, Programming, Synthesizer Programming
- Wilton Felder – Producer
- David Gibb – Graphic Design, Design
- William Green – Flute, Piccolo, Saxophone
- Carl Griffen – Producer, Compilation Producer
- Carl Griffin – Producer, Compilation
- Dave Grusin – Executive Producer
- Stix Hooper – Percussion, Drums, Producer
- Fred Jackson, Jr. – Saz, Saxophone
- Paul Jackson, Jr. – Electric Guitar
- Josie James – Vocals
- Ted Jensen – Mastering
- Scott Johnson – Design
- Abraham Laboriel – Bass
- Michael Landy – Producer, Digital Editing, Editing, Post Production
- Michelle Lewis – Production Coordination
- Steve Medajo – Trumpet
- Sonny Mediana – Graphic Design, Design
- Byron Miller – Bass
- Robert O'Bryant – Trumpet
- Ray Parker Jr. – Rhythm Guitar
- Dean Parks – Acoustic & Electric Guitar
- Rik Pekkonen – Engineer, Mixing
- John Phillips – Bass Clarinet
- Robert Popwell – Bass
- Billy Rogers – Guitar
- Larry Rosen – Executive Producer
- Andy Ruggirello – Graphic Design, Design
- Joe Sample – Synthesizer, Piano, Strings, Arranger, Conductor, Keyboards, Piano (Electric), Producer, Liner Notes, Fender Rhodes, Orchestration, String Arrangements, Synthesizer Piano, Piano (Grand), String Conductor
- Dan Serrano – Graphic Design, Design
- Sid Sharp – Strings
- Dr. George Shaw – Synthesizer, Programming
- George Shaw – Programming
- Zan Stewart – Liner Notes
- Greg Venable – Engineer
- Ernie Watts – Flute, Piccolo, Saxophone
- Pauline Wilson – Background Vocals
