= Patterns (Bobby Hutcherson album) =

1968 studio album by Bobby Hutcherson (released in 1980)

Studio album by Bobby Hutcherson
- Released: 1980; 1995 (CD)
- Recorded: March 14, 1968
- Studio: Van Gelder Studio, Englewood Cliffs, NJ
- Genre: Post-bop
- Length: 36:39
- Label: Blue Note; LT 1044; CDP 7243 8 33583
- Producer: Duke Pearson, Francis Wolff

Bobby Hutcherson chronology
| Conception: The Gift of Love (1979) | Patterns (1980) | Medina (1980) |

Alternative cover
- 1995 CD reissue

Professional ratings
Review scores
| Source | Rating |
|---|---|
| AllMusic | 4/5 stars |
| The Penguin Guide to Jazz Recordings | 3/4 stars |
| The Rolling Stone Jazz Record Guide | 3/5 stars |

Patterns is an album by the jazz vibraphonist Bobby Hutcherson, released on the Blue Note label. Although recorded in 1968, the album was not released until 1980. "A Time to Go" was composed by James Spaulding as a tribute to Martin Luther King Jr., recorded just three weeks before his assassination. "Effi" was composed by Stanley Cowell as a dedication to his wife, and the remaining pieces were composed by Joe Chambers.

== Track listing ==
Original release (1980)

All tracks by Joe Chambers, unless otherwise noted.
A1. "Patterns" - 5:54
A2. "A Time to Go" (Spaulding) - 5:44
A3. "Ankara" - 6:24
B1. "Effi" (Cowell) - 7:07
B2. "Irina" - 7:20
B3. "Nocturnal" - 4:12

CD release (1995)

1. "Effi" (Cowell) - 7:07
2. "Irina" - 7:20
3. "Nocturnal" - 4:12
4. "Patterns" - 5:54
5. "A Time to Go" (Spaulding) - 5:44
6. "Ankara" - 6:24
7. "Patterns" [alternate take] - 6:00

Remasterd CD release (2012)

1. "Patterns" - 5:56
2. "A Time to Go" (Spaulding) - 5:46
3. "Ankara" - 6:23
4. "Effi" (Cowell) - 7:08
5. "Irina" - 7:20
6. "Nocturnal" - 4:13
7. "Patterns" [alternate take] - 6:01

== Personnel ==
- Bobby Hutcherson - vibraphone
- James Spaulding - alto saxophone 4 tracks, flute 3 tracks
- Stanley Cowell - piano
- Reggie Workman - bass
- Joe Chambers - drums
