= Manhattan Moods =

Studio album by McCoy Tyner & Bobby Hutcherson
- Released: September 1994
- Recorded: December 3–4, 1993
- Genre: Jazz
- Length: 57:17
- Label: Blue Note
- Producer: Michael Cuscuna

McCoy Tyner chronology
Journey (1993)	Manhattan Moods (1994)	Prelude and Sonata (1994)

Bobby Hutcherson chronology
Acoustic Masters II (1994)	Manhattan Moods (1994)	The Kicker (1999)

Professional ratings
Review scores
Source	Rating
Allmusic	4/5 stars
The Penguin Guide to Jazz Recordings	4/4 stars

Manhattan Moods is an album by pianist McCoy Tyner and vibraphonist Bobby Hutcherson released on the Blue Note label in 1994. It was recorded in December 1993 and features nine duet performances by Hutcherson and Tyner.

== Reception ==
The Allmusic review by Scott Yanow states that "It is not too surprising that they blend together quite well for both remain advanced improvisers who are tied to the hard bop/modal tradition".

== Track listing ==
1. "Manhattan Moods" - 8:38
2. "Blue Monk" (Monk) - 7:56
3. "Dearly Beloved" (Kern, Mercer) - 6:47
4. "I Loves You, Porgy" (Gershwin, Gershwin, Heyward) - 3:47
5. "Isn't This My Sound Around Me" (Hutcherson) - 6:52
6. "Soul Eyes" (Waldron) - 5:58
7. "Travelin' Blues" - 4:47
8. "Rosie" (Hutcherson) - 5:51
9. "For Heaven's Sake" (Elise Bretton, Sherman Edwards, Donald Meyer) - 6:41

All compositions by McCoy Tyner except as indicated
- Recorded in NYC, December 3 & 4, 1993

== Personnel ==
- McCoy Tyner - piano
- Bobby Hutcherson - vibes, marimba
