= Double Exposure (Joe Chambers album) =

Studio album by Joe Chambers
- Released: 1978
- Recorded: November 16, 1977
- Studios: CI, NYC
- Genre: Jazz
- Length: 39:43
- Labels: Muse; MR 5165
- Producer: Frederick Seibert

Joe Chambers chronology
New World (1976)	Double Exposure (1978)	Lend Me Your Ears (1978)

Double Exposure is the third release by drummer/pianist/composer Joe Chambers. It is a duo album featuring Larry Young on Hammond organ and synthesizer. It was recorded in 1977 and released on the Muse label.

The song "Mind Rain" was sampled in the Nas song "N.Y. State of Mind", off his debut album, Illmatic.

== Reception ==
Professional ratings
Review scores
Source	Rating
AllMusic	3/5 stars
DownBeat	4/5 stars
The Rolling Stone Jazz Record Guide	3/5 stars

The Bay State Banner wrote: "While Chambers' piano is energetic and capable, Young's soaring organ themes and sensitive answering counter point actually highlight the album. When Chambers returns to the drums on the final two selections and cuts loose, Young responds responds with waves of sonic excitement, anticipating and pacing the beats and accents of Chambers."

In his review for AllMusic, Scott Yanow stated: "The music is somewhat adventurous with Chambers as the lead voice on the numbers on which he plays piano; the final two performances are organ-drum duets that put more of an emphasis on Young's unique sound. This interesting session has some surprising music."

== Track listing ==
All compositions by Joe Chambers except as indicated

1. "Hello to the Wind" – 8:50
2. "The Orge" (Larry Young) – 5:30
3. "Mind Rain" – 9:00
4. "After the Rain" – 4:30
5. "Message from Mars" (Young) – 6:07
6. "Rock Pile" – 5:50

== Personnel ==
- Joe Chambers - piano (tracks 1–4), electric piano (track 2), tabla (track 2), cymbal (tracks 2 & 3), drums (tracks 5 & 6)
- Larry Young - organ (tracks 1–3, 5 & 6), synthesizer (track 2)
