= Stick-Up! =

Studio album by Bobby Hutcherson
- Released: March 1968
- Recorded: July 14, 1966
- Studio: Van Gelder Studio, Englewood Cliffs, NJ
- Genre: Jazz, hard bop
- Length: 40:26
- Label: Blue Note; BST 84244
- Producer: Alfred Lion

Bobby Hutcherson chronology
Happenings (1967)	Stick-Up! (1968)	Total Eclipse (1969)

Professional ratings
Review scores
Source	Rating
AllMusic	4.5/5 stars
The Penguin Guide to Jazz	4/4 stars

Stick-Up! is an album by the jazz vibraphonist Bobby Hutcherson, released on the Blue Note label in 1968. The album is Hutcherson's first without drummer Joe Chambers. Billy Higgins took over on drums on the recording session. It also features Joe Henderson and is the first recorded meeting of the vibist and pianist McCoy Tyner. Five of the six tracks are Hutcherson compositions, with the exception being Ornette Coleman's "Una Muy Bonita".

== Track listing ==
All compositions by Bobby Hutcherson except as noted.

1. "Una Muy Bonita" (Ornette Coleman) - 6:27
2. "8/4 Beat" - 6:59
3. "Summer Nights" - 6:59
4. "Black Circle" - 6:57
5. "Verse" - 9:32
6. "Blues Mind Matter" - 3:32

== Personnel ==
- Bobby Hutcherson - vibraphone
- Joe Henderson - tenor saxophone (except track 3)
- McCoy Tyner - piano
- Herbie Lewis - bass
- Billy Higgins - drums

== Charts ==
2022 chart performance for Stick-Up!
Chart (2022)	Peak position
German Albums (Offizielle Top 100)	73
