= Happenings (Bobby Hutcherson album) =

Studio album by Bobby Hutcherson
- Released: End of January 1967
- Recorded: February 8, 1966
- Studio: Van Gelder Studio, Englewood Cliffs, NJ
- Genre: Post-bop
- Length: 43:53
- Label: Blue Note; BST 84231
- Producer: Alfred Lion

Bobby Hutcherson chronology
Components (1966)	Happenings (1967)	Stick-Up! (1968)

Professional ratings
Review scores
Source	Rating
AllMusic	4/5 stars
DownBeat	5/5 stars
The Penguin Guide to Jazz	3/4 stars

Happenings is an album by the jazz vibraphonist Bobby Hutcherson, released in 1967 on the Blue Note label. The album contains six compositions by Hutcherson, and one by Herbie Hancock, "Maiden Voyage".

== Track listing ==
All compositions by Bobby Hutcherson, except as indicated.

1. "Aquarian Moon" - 7:45
2. "Bouquet" - 8:10
3. "Rojo" - 6:03
4. "Maiden Voyage" (Hancock) - 5:49
5. "Head Start" - 5:16
6. "When You Are Near" - 3:51
7. "The Omen" - 6:59

== Personnel ==
- Bobby Hutcherson - vibraphone (tracks 1–6), marimba, drums (track 7 only)
- Herbie Hancock - piano, box full of rocks (track 7 only)
- Bob Cranshaw - bass
- Joe Chambers - drums, marimba (track 7 only), triangle (tracks 2, 7), timpani (track 7 only)
