= Among Friends (Cedar Walton album) =

Live album by Cedar Walton
- Released: 1989
- Recorded: July 1982 at Keystone Korner, San Francisco, CA
- Genre: Jazz
- Length: 50:44
- Label: Theresa TR 129
- Producer: Bobby Hutcherson

Cedar Walton chronology
Heart & Soul (1982)	Among Friends (1989)	Timeless Heart (1983)

Among Friends is a live album by American jazz pianist Cedar Walton recorded in 1982 at Keystone Korner in San Francisco at the same series of concerts that produced Bobby Hutcherson's Farewell Keystone and first released on the Theresa label in 1989. As the album was the final release on the Theresa label so the 1992 Evidence CD received greater distribution.

== Reception ==
Writing in the Chicago Tribune, Jack Fuller stated: "It is a simple pleasure to listen to Cedar Walton play piano. He has all the basics, beginning with swing. There's a literate sense of humor, too, that shows up in the music he quotes. Here, with Billy Higgins on drums and Buster Williams on bass, he does a set of standards in the right place." Allmusic awarded the album 4 stars and called it an "Excellent hard bop-based music from the talented pianist".

Professional ratings
Review scores
Source	Rating
Allmusic	4/5 stars
The Penguin Guide to Jazz Recordings	3/4 stars

== Track listing ==
1. "For All We Know" (J. Fred Coots, Sam M. Lewis) - 7:11
2. "Without a Song" (Edward Eliscu, Billy Rose, Vincent Youmans) - 9:15
3. "Off Minor" (Thelonious Monk) - 7:11
4. "My Foolish Heart" (Ned Washington, Victor Young) - 1:15
5. "Midnight Waltz" (Cedar Walton) - 11:29
6. "Solo Medley: Ruby, My Dear/My Old Flame/I've Grown Accustomed to Her Face" (Monk/Sam Coslow, Arthur Johnson/Alan Jay Lernerl, Frederick Loewe) - 14:23

== Personnel ==
- Cedar Walton - piano
- Buster Williams - bass (tracks 1–5)
- Billy Higgins - drums (tracks 1–5)
- Bobby Hutcherson - vibraphone (track 4)
