= Medina (album) =

1969 studio album by Bobby Hutcherson (released in 1980)

Studio album by Bobby Hutcherson
- Released: 1980; 1998 (CD)
- Recorded: August 11, 1969
- Studio: Van Gelder Studio, Englewood Cliffs, NJ
- Genre: Post-bop
- Length: 40:15
- Label: Blue Note; LT 1086; 7243 4 97508 2 1
- Producer: Duke Pearson, Francis Wolff

Bobby Hutcherson chronology
Patterns (1980)	Medina (1980)	Inner Glow (1980)

Alternative cover
- CD reissue (1998)

Professional ratings
Review scores
Source	Rating
Allmusic	5/5 stars
The Rolling Stone Jazz Record Guide	4/5 stars

Medina is an album by jazz vibraphonist Bobby Hutcherson. It was released in 1980 on Blue Note Records (LT 1086), featuring six tracks recorded on 11 August 1969. The CD reissue added five tracks (#7–11), recorded in 1968 and previously released on vinyl in 1979 under the title Spiral.

== Track listing ==
Original release (1980)

All compositions by Bobby Hutcherson except as noted
A1. "Avis" – 6:44
A2. "Comes Spring" – 3:22
A3. "Dave's Chant" (Cowell) – 5:16
A4. "Orientale" (Cowell) – 5:53
B1. "Medina" (Chambers) – 10:57
B2. "Ungano" (Chambers) – 8:03

Bonus tracks on CD reissue (1998)

from Spiral (1979)

7. "Ruth" (Chambers) – 7:52
8. "The Wedding March" (Cowell) – 3:54
9. "Poor People's March" (Land) – 6:18
10. "Spiral" (Chambers) – 6:15
11. "Visions" – 3:50

== Personnel ==
- Bobby Hutcherson – vibraphone, marimba
- Harold Land – saxophone
- Stanley Cowell – piano
- Reggie Johnson – bass
- Joe Chambers – drums
