= San Francisco (Bobby Hutcherson album) =

Studio album by Bobby Hutcherson featuring Harold Land
- Released: May 1971; 1992 (CD in Japan)
- Recorded: July 15, 1970
- Studio: United Artists Studios, Los Angeles
- Genre: Jazz, jazz fusion
- Length: 41:03
- Label: Blue Note; BST 84362; TOCJ-5735
- Producer: Duke Pearson, Michael Cuscuna

Bobby Hutcherson chronology
Now! (1970)	San Francisco (1971)	Head On (1971)

Harold Land chronology
Now! (1970)	San Francisco (1971)	A New Shade of Blue (1971)

Professional ratings
Review scores
Source	Rating
AllMusic	4.5/5 stars
The Rolling Stone Jazz Record Guide	3/5 stars
The Penguin Guide to Jazz Recordings	3/4 stars

San Francisco is an album by jazz vibraphonist Bobby Hutcherson and saxophonist Harold Land, released on the Blue Note label in May 1971. The album features a shift away from the usual hard bop-post-bop style pursued previously by Hutcherson and Land, and shifts towards jazz fusion.

== Track listing ==
All compositions by Bobby Hutcherson except as indicated

1. "Goin' Down South" (Sample) – 7:10
2. "Prints Tie" – 7:29
3. "Jazz" (Sample) – 5:26
4. "Ummh" – 7:49
5. "Procession" – 5:46
6. "A Night in Barcelona" (Land) – 7:23

== Personnel ==
Musicians

- Bobby Hutcherson – vibraphone, marimba, percussion
- Harold Land – tenor saxophone, flute, oboe
- Joe Sample – piano, electric piano
- John Williams – bass, Fender bass
- Mickey Roker – drums

Production

- Michael Cuscuna – producer
- Duke Pearson – producer
- David Brand – engineer
