= Components (album) =

Studio album by Bobby Hutcherson
- Released: November 1966
- Recorded: June 10, 1965
- Studio: Van Gelder Studio, Englewood Cliffs, NJ
- Genre: Modal jazz, post-bop
- Length: 41:05
- Label: Blue Note; BST 84213
- Producer: Alfred Lion

Bobby Hutcherson chronology
| Dialogue (1965) | Components (1966) | Happenings (1967) |

Professional ratings
Review scores
| Source | Rating |
|---|---|
| AllMusic | 5/5 stars |
| DownBeat | 3/5 stars |
| The Penguin Guide to Jazz | 3.5/4 stars |

Components is an album by jazz vibraphonist Bobby Hutcherson, released on the Blue Note label in 1966. The first side of the LP features compositions by Hutcherson, in a hard bop style, whilst the second side features Joe Chambers' compositions, more in the avant-garde style.

== Composition ==
Hutcherson describes "Tranquillity" as "so tranquil as to almost suggest no time at all." "Little B's Poem" was written for his son, Barry, three years old at the time. "The melodic line reminds me of how he used to play." "West 22nd Street Theme", which closes side one, is a reference to a Manhattan section near the 10th Ave, Chelsea, where Hutcherson lived for a while. It is a depiction of some guys who used to be on Hutcherson's doorstep, stoned. "It's a blues," says Hutcherson, "but the changes are different than the usual blues chords."

Side two features Chambers originals. "Movement" is "like a six-part theme constantly in motion, held together by a pulse." It was described by Nat Hentoff as a piece where "different listeners can find widely different visions." About "Air", Chambers says: "Once that's set, they all jump into free counterpoint. As in all the pieces, each voice has to remain independent but in relationship to what's going on around him." "Pastoral" signifies a comeback to a kind of primitive setting, "as if to say to the listener 'This is what we come back to – the familiar, the beginning'."

== Track listing ==
| No. | Title | Writer(s) | Length |
|---|---|---|---|
| 1. | "Components" | Hutcherson | 6:25 |
| 2. | "Tranquillity" | Hutcherson | 5:03 |
| 3. | "Little B’s Poem" | Hutcherson | 5:11 |
| 4. | "West 22nd Street Theme" | Hutcherson | 4:43 |
| 5. | "Movement" | Chambers | 7:31 |
| 6. | "Juba Dance" | Chambers | 5:23 |
| 7. | "Air" | Chambers | 4:48 |
| 8. | "Pastoral" | Chambers | 2:02 |

== Personnel ==
- Bobby Hutcherson – vibraphone, marimba
- James Spaulding – alto saxophone, flute
- Freddie Hubbard – trumpet
- Herbie Hancock – piano, organ
- Ron Carter – double bass
- Joe Chambers – drums

== Charts ==
=== Monthly charts ===
Monthly chart performance for Components
| Chart (2026) | Peak position |
|---|---|
| German Jazz Albums (Offizielle Top 100) | 15 |
