= The View from the Inside =

Studio album by Bobby Hutcherson
- Released: 1977; 2013 (CD in Japan)
- Recorded: August 4–6, 1976
- Genre: Jazz
- Length: 42:52
- Labels: Blue Note; BN LA 710; TOCJ-50580
- Producer: Dale Oehler

Bobby Hutcherson chronology
| Waiting (1976) | The View from the Inside (1977) | Knucklebean (1977) |

The View from the Inside is an album by American jazz vibraphonist Bobby Hutcherson recorded in 1976 and released on the Blue Note label. The session has been released on CD in 2007 as part of Mosaic Select: Bobby Hutcherson.

== Reception ==
The Allmusic review by Scott Yanow awarded the album 3 stars stating "Some of the vibist's later Blue Note albums are forgettable but this LP... has some excellent hard bop music. The material is generally melodic but has some fine solos".

Professional ratings
Review scores
| Source | Rating |
|---|---|
| Allmusic | 3/5 stars |
| The Rolling Stone Jazz Record Guide | 3/5 stars |

== Track listing ==
All tracks are written by Bobby Hutcherson, except as indicated.

| No. | Title | Writer(s) | Length |
|---|---|---|---|
| 1. | "Later, Even" | | 3:51 |
| 2. | "Houston St. Thursday Afternoon" | | 6:27 |
| 3. | "Same, Shame" | | 10:22 |
| 4. | "Love Can Be Many Things" | James Leary III | 4:48 |
| 5. | "Song for Annie" | Emanuel Boyd | 6:29 |
| 6. | "Laugh, Laugh Again" | James Leary III | 4:19 |
| 7. | "For Heaven's Sake" | Elise Bretton, Sherman Edwards, Don Meyer | 6:36 |
| Total length: | | | 42:52 |

- Recorded at Wally Heider Sound Studios in San Francisco, California on August 4 (track 7), August 5 (tracks 1, 3–4) and August 6 (tracks 2, 5–6), 1976.

== Personnel ==
- Bobby Hutcherson – vibes
- Emanuel Boyd – tenor saxophone, soprano saxophone
- Larry Nash – piano, electric piano
- James Leary III – bass
- Eddie Marshall – drums
