= James Leary (musician) =

American double bassist and arranger/composer

James Houston Leary III (June 4, 1946 – March 22, 2021) was an American double bass player and arranger/composer. Among his notable teachers and mentors was Ortiz Walton, the youngest member to sign with the Boston Symphony and its first African America member. Leary played double bass with the Count Basie Orchestra, Nancy Wilson, Earl Hines, Bobby Hutcherson, Eddie Harris, Dizzy Gillespie with the San Francisco Pops conducted by Arthur Fiedler, Max Roach, Eddie Cleanhead Vinson, Rahsaan Roland Kirk, Johnny Hartman, Major Lance, Johnny Taylor, Esther Phillips, Rosemary Clooney, and Don Shirley. His involvement with Broadway shows included Eubie!, They're Playing Our Song, Ain't Misbehavin', Bubbling Brown Sugar, Five Guys Named Moe, Timbuktu! with Eartha Kitt, Oakland Symphony Bass Section, Pharoah Sanders, Red Garland, Jaki Byard, Randy Weston, and John Handy.

Leary was featured as one of the jazz performers at The Blue Spot in the 1996 film 'That Thing You Do'.

Leary was born in Little Rock, Arkansas, United States, and studied at the University of Arkansas at Pine Bluff. He won two Grammy Awards.

He died at his home in Los Angeles, on March 22, 2021.

== Discography ==
=== As leader ===
- Legacy (Blue Collar, 1981)
- James (Vital, 1991)
- James II (Vital, 1992)
- Together (LifeForceJazz, 2012)

=== As sideman ===
With Eddie Harris

- Sounds Incredible (Angelaco, 1980)

With The Gene Harris All Star Big Band

- Tribute to Count Basie (Concord Jazz, 1988)

With Earl Hines

- Hines '74 (Black & Blue, 1974)
- The Dirty Old Men with Budd Johnson (Black & Blue, 1974)
- Earl Hines at Sundown (Black & Blue, 1974)

With Bobby Hutcherson

- Waiting (Blue Note, 1976)
- The View from the Inside (Blue Note, 1977)

With Abbey Lincoln

- Sophisticated Abbey: Live at the Keystone Korner (HighNote, 1980 [2015])
- Love Having You Around: Live at the Keystone Korner Vol. 2 (HighNote, 1980 [2016])
