= Idle Moments =

Studio album by Grant Green
- Released: February 1965
- Recorded: November 4 & 15, 1963
- Studio: Van Gelder Studio (Englewood Cliffs, NJ)
- Genre: Jazz; hard bop
- Length: 42:45 original LP; 64:06 CD reissue
- Label: Blue Note; BST 84154
- Producer: Alfred Lion

Grant Green chronology
Am I Blue (1963)	Idle Moments (1965)	Matador (1964)

Professional ratings
Review scores
Source	Rating
Allmusic	5/5 stars
Down Beat	4/5 stars
Encyclopedia of Popular Music	4/5 stars
The Penguin Guide to Jazz	4/4 stars

Idle Moments is an album by American jazz guitarist Grant Green recorded in 1963 and released on the Blue Note label in 1965. It features performances by tenor saxophonist Joe Henderson, vibraphonist Bobby Hutcherson, pianist Duke Pearson, bassist Bob Cranshaw and drummer Al Harewood.

== Recording and music ==
The album is best known for the title piece, a slow composition in C minor which lasts for nearly 15 minutes. Pearson, who wrote the song, explains in his liner notes to the album that the tune was meant to be much shorter. Due to the musicians repeating the main melody twice, however, there was some confusion as to whether or not one chorus would consist of 16 or 32 bars. Producer Alfred Lion was satisfied with the take, although he suggested that they do a retake to fit the song into a seven-minute limit. However, the song had a special feeling to it which no subsequent take could recapture, so it was decided to release the first take on the album. Two other songs, "Jean De Fleur" and "Django", were re-recorded in shorter renditions to compensate for the length of the title track; the extended renditions of both songs can be heard on the CD re-issues of the album.

== Release ==
Idle Moments was released in both stereo and mono in February 1965. On October 23, 2020, Blue Note announced that Idle Moments would be reissued as part of their Classic Vinyl Reissue Series with a 180g vinyl pressing. Released on June 11, 2021, the album was remastered by Kevin Gray directly from the original master tapes.

== Reception ==
Steve Huey of AllMusic states that Green treats the repertoire of this album "with the graceful elegance that was the hallmark of his best hard bop sessions, and that quality achieves its fullest expression here... Idle Moments is the essential first Green purchase, and some of the finest guitar jazz of the hard bop era." The album was identified by jazz historian and journalist Scott Yanow in his essay "What is Hard Bop?" as one of the "17 Essential Hard Bop Recordings".

== Track listing ==
Side One
No.	Title	Writer(s)	Recorded	Length
1.	"Idle Moments"	Pearson	November 4, 1963	14:56
2.	"Jean De Fleur"	Green	November 15, 1963	6:49

Side Two
No.	Title	Writer(s)	Recorded	Length
3.	"Django"	John Lewis	November 15, 1963	8:44
4.	"Nomad"	Pearson	November 4, 1963	12:16
Total length:				42:45

1990 CD reissue bonus tracks

No.	Title	Writer(s)	Recorded	Length
5.	"Jean De Fleur" (Alternate Take)	Green	November 4, 1963	8:09
6.	"Django" (Alternate Take)	Lewis	November 4, 1963	13:12
Total length:				64:06

== Personnel ==
- Grant Green – guitar
- Joe Henderson – tenor saxophone
- Duke Pearson – piano
- Bobby Hutcherson – vibraphone
- Bob Cranshaw – double bass
- Al Harewood – drums

== Charts ==
Chart performance for Idle Moments
Chart (2021)	Peak position
Belgian Albums (Ultratop Wallonia)	100
