= Inner Glow =

Studio album by Bobby Hutcherson
- Released: 1980 (Japan)
- Recorded: March 24–25, 1975
- Studio: United Artists Studios, Los Angeles
- Genre: Jazz
- Length: 42:59
- Label: Blue Note; GXF-3073
- Producer: Bobby Hutcherson, Michael Cuscuna

Bobby Hutcherson chronology
Medina (1980)	Inner Glow (1980)	Un Poco Loco (1980)

Inner Glow is an album by American jazz vibraphonist Bobby Hutcherson recorded in 1975 and originally released on the Japanese Blue Note label. While never issued in the U.S. the tracks were included on the Mosaic Records box set Mosaic Select 26: Bobby Hutcherson, released in 2007.

== Track listing ==
All compositions by Bobby Hutcherson except as indicated

1. "Boodaa" - 10:06
2. "Cowboy Bob" - 9:31
3. "Searchin' the Trane" - 8:04
4. "Inner Glow" (George Cables) - 7:59
5. "Roses Poses" - 7:19

- Recorded on March 24 (tracks 1, 3 & 5) and March 25 (tracks 2 & 4), 1975.

== Personnel ==
Musicians

- Bobby Hutcherson - vibes
- Oscar Brashear - trumpet
- Thurman Green - trombone
- Harold Land - tenor saxophone
- Dwight Dickenson - piano
- Kent Brinkley - bass
- Larry Hancock - drums

Production

- Bobby Hutcherson – producer
- Michael Cuscuna – release producer
- Bert D'Angelo – recording engineer
- Katsuji Abe – photography
