= Joe Chambers =

American jazz musician and composer (born 1942)

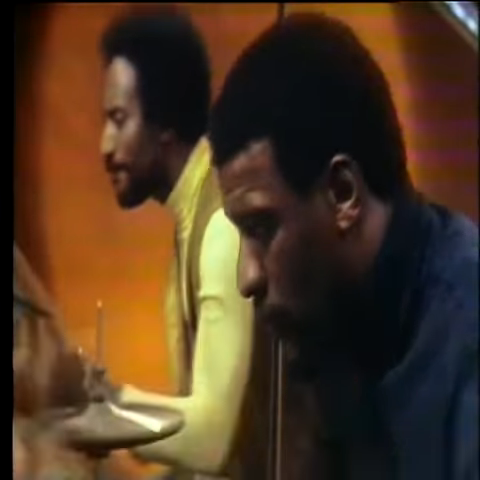
- Joe Chambers (right) with Freddie Waits (left)

Background information
- Born: Joseph Chambers; June 25, 1942 (age 84); Stoneacre, Virginia, U.S.
- Genres: Jazz
- Occupations: Musician, composer
- Instruments: Drums, piano, vibraphone
- Years active: 1963–Present
- Labels: Muse, Finite, Baystate, Blue Note, Savant

Joe Chambers (born June 25, 1942) is an American jazz drummer, pianist, vibraphonist and composer. In the 1960s and 1970s, Chambers gigged with many high-profile artists such as Eric Dolphy, Charles Mingus, Wayne Shorter, and Chick Corea and played on several iconic Blue Note albums of the 1960s. During this period, his compositions were featured on albums by Freddie Hubbard and Bobby Hutcherson. Chambers has released sixteen albums as a bandleader and was a founding member of Max Roach's M'Boom percussion ensemble.

He has also taught, including at the New School for Jazz and Contemporary Music in New York City, where he led the Outlaw Band. In 2008, he was hired to be the Thomas S. Kenan Distinguished Professor of Jazz in the Department of Music at the University of North Carolina Wilmington. He is a retired educator and works as a jazz musician, composer, and leader.

== Early life ==
Joe Chambers was born in Stoneacre, Virginia in 1942. However, Chambers was mostly raised in Chester, Pennsylvania. He attended the Philadelphia Conservatory for one year before moving to Washington, DC. The classical composer Talib Rasul Hakim (born Stephen Alexander Chambers) was his younger brother. The first instrument he played was the piano before he moved on to playing the vibraphone and drums. He was inspired by various jazz drummers, such as Max Roach, Philly Joe Jones, and Elvin Jones.

Chambers lived in Washington from 1960 to 1963. Chambers’ earliest gigs were recorded during the time of his eighteenth year when he toured with Bobby Lewis and the JFK Quintet. Chambers was mainly working at the Bohemian Caverns in Washington, D.C., where he spent six nights a week playing gigs.

== Music career ==
Chambers was recognized by Freddie Hubbard, who encouraged him to move to New York City in 1963, where he played with various artists such as Eric Dolphy, Freddie Hubbard, Jimmy Giuffre, and Andrew Hill. Drummer Tony Williams set Chambers up with a recording of “Mirrors,” where he gained exposure and joined Blue Note. His debut recording with Blue Note was on Freddie Hubbard's album Breaking Point, which also included his composition Mirrors. He soon joined Blue Note as the house percussionist and drummer. In 1964, Chambers gigged at Minton’s Playhouse alongside Blue Mitchell and Chick Corea.

In 1970, he joined Max Roach’s percussion ensemble M’Boom. The group often practiced at Warren Smith’s Studio on West 21st Street, where Chambers first learned the vibraphone. He played alongside Sonny Rollins, Tommy Flanagan, Charles Mingus, and Art Farmer. Chambers created the Super Jazz Trio with Flanagan and bassist Reggie Workman. Chambers debut recording as a band leader came in 1974 with The Almoravid. In the late 1970s, he helped lead a band alongside Larry Young, an organist. In the early 1980s, Chambers collaborated with artists such as Chet Baker and Ray Mantilla.

Chamber was hired as instructor in 1990 at the New School of Jazz and Contemporary Music in NYC. He later taught at the University of North Carolina, Wilmington. He currently does not teach and is focusing on his career in jazz. In 2021 he returned to Blue Note and released his album, Samba de Maracatu. He released Dance Kobina in 2023.

== Achievements and legacy ==
During his time at the University of North Carolina, Wilmington, Chambers was titled the first Thomas S. Kenan Distinguished Professor of Jazz in 2008. In 1994, the Nas song NY State of Mind sampled a piano loop from Mind Rain on Chambers's 1978 album Double Exposure.

== Discography ==
=== As leader ===
- 1973: The Almoravid (Muse, 1974)
- 1976: New World (Finite, 1976)
- 1977: Double Exposure (Muse, 1978)
- 1979: Joe Chambers and Friends: Chamber Music (Baystate, 1979)
- 1979: Joe Chambers Plays Piano (Denon, 1979)
- 1981: New York Concerto featuring Yoshiaki Masuo (Baystate, 1981)
- 1991: Phantom of the City (Candid, 1992) – live
- 1995: Isla Verde with Trio Dejaiz (Paddle Wheel, 1995)
- 1998: Mirrors (Blue Note, 1999)
- 2002: Urban Grooves (Eighty-Eight's, 2002)
- 2005: The Outlaw (Savant, 2006)
- 2009: Horace to Max (Savant, 2010)
- 2012: Joe Chambers Moving Pictures Orchestra (Savant, 2012)
- 2015: Landscapes (Savant, 2016)
- 2020: Samba de Maracatu (Blue Note, 2021)
- 2022: Dance Kobina (Blue Note, 2023)

=== As sideman ===
With Donald Byrd

- Mustang! (Blue Note, 1967) – recorded in 1964-1966
- Fancy Free (Blue Note, 1970) – recorded in 1969

With Stanley Cowell

- Brilliant Circles (Freedom, 1972) – recorded in 1969
- Back to the Beautiful (Concord, 1989)

With Joe Henderson

- Mode for Joe (Blue Note, 1966)
- Big Band (Verve, 1997) – recorded in 1992-1996

With Andrew Hill

- Andrew!!! (Blue Note, 1968) – recorded in 1964
- Compulsion!!!!! (Blue Note, 1967) – recorded in 1965
- One For One (Blue Note, 1975) – recorded in 1965-1970

With Bobby Hutcherson

- Dialogue (Blue Note, 1965)
- Components (Blue Note, 1966) – recorded in 1965
- Happenings (Blue Note, 1967) – recorded in 1966
- Total Eclipse (Blue Note, 1969) – recorded in 1968
- Now!, (Blue Note, 1970) – recorded in 1969
- Oblique (Blue Note, 1979) – recorded in 1967
- Spiral (Blue Note, 1979) – recorded in 1965-68
- Patterns (Blue Note, 1980) – recorded in 1968
- Medina, (Blue Note, 1980) – recorded in 1969
- Blow Up, (JMY, 1969 released 1990)

With M'Boom

- Re: Percussion (Strata-East, 1973)
- M'Boom (Columbia, 1979)
- Collage (Soul Note, 1984)
- To the Max! (Enja, 1992) – recorded in 1990–1991

With Charles Mingus

- Charles Mingus and Friends in Concert (Columbia, 1972)
- Something Like a Bird (Atlantic, 1978)
- Me, Myself an Eye (Atlantic, 1978)

With Woody Shaw

- In the Beginning (Muse, 1983) – recorded in 1965
- The Iron Men with Anthony Braxton (Muse, 1980) – recorded in 1977

With Archie Shepp

- Fire Music (Impulse!, 1965)
- On This Night (Impulse!, 1965)
- New Thing at Newport (Impulse!, 1966) – recorded in 1965. also features a set by John Coltrane.
- For Losers (Impulse!, 1969)
- Kwanza (Impulse!, 1969)
- On Green Dolphin Street (Denon, 1978)

With Wayne Shorter

- Et Cetera (Blue Note, 1980) – recorded in 1965
- The All Seeing Eye (Blue Note, 1966) – recorded in 1965
- Adam's Apple (Blue Note, 1967) – recorded in 1966
- Schizophrenia (Blue Note, 1969) – recorded in 1967

With The Super Jazz Trio

- The Super Jazz Trio (Baystate, 1978)
- Something Tasty (Baystate, 1979)
- The Standard (Baystate, 1980)

With others

- Franck Amsallem, Summer Times (Sunnyside, 2003)
- Chet Baker, Peace (Enja, 1982)
- Chick Corea, Tones for Joan's Bones (Atlantic, 1968)
- Miles Davis, The Complete In a Silent Way Sessions (Columbia, 2001)
- Art Farmer, Something Tasty (Baystate, 1979)
- Don Friedman, Metamorphosis (Prestige, 1966)
- Jimmy Giuffre, New York Concerts (1965; Elemental Music, 2014)
- Freddie Hubbard, Breaking Point (Blue Note, 1964)
- Robin Kenyatta, Nomusa (Muse, 1975)
- Lee Konitz, Figure & Spirit (Progressive, 1977)
- Hubert Laws, Wild Flower (Atlantic, 1972)
- Ray Mantilla, Mantilla (Inner City, 1978)
- Grachan Moncur III, Shadows, (Denon, 1977)
- Karl Ratzer, In Search Of The Ghost, (Vanguard, 1978)
- Sam Rivers, Contours, (Blue Note, 1967)
- Jeremy Steig, Lend Me Your Ears, (CMP, 1978)
- Heiner Stadler, Brains On Fire Vol. 1 (Labor, 1973)
- John Stubblefield, Prelude (Storyville, 1978)
- Ed Summerlin, Sum of the Parts (Ictus, 1998)
- Hidefumi Toki, City (Baystate, 1978)
- Charles Tolliver, Paper Man (Freedom, 1975)
- McCoy Tyner, Tender Moments (Blue Note, 1968)
- Miroslav Vitous, Infinite Search, (Embryo, 1970)
- Tyrone Washington, Natural Essence (Blue Note, 1968)
- Joe Zawinul, Zawinul (Atlantic, 1971)
