= Eddie Marshall =

American jazz drummer (1938–2011)

- Born: Edwin Marshall; April 13, 1938; Springfield, Massachusetts, U.S.
- Died: September 7, 2011 (aged 73)
- Genres: Jazz
- Occupation: Musician
- Instrument: Drums
- Years active: 1958–1980s

Edwin "Eddie" Marshall (April 13, 1938 – September 7, 2011) was an American jazz drummer.

== Biography ==
Marshall was born in Springfield, Massachusetts. He played in his father's swing group and in R&B bands while in high school. He moved to New York City in 1956, developing his percussion style under the influence of Max Roach and Art Blakey. Two years later, he played in the quartet of Charlie Mariano and with Toshiko Akiyoshi; after two years' service in the Army, he returned to play with Akiyoshi again in 1965. He worked with Mike Nock for a year in the house band of the New York nightclub the Dom, also worked with Stan Getz and Sam Rivers, and accompanied Dionne Warwick on tours.

In 1967, he was a member of The Fourth Way, a fusion group which included Nock, Michael White, and Ron McClure. This group toured the San Francisco Bay Area through the early 1970s; after this, Marshall played with Jon Hendricks and The Pointer Sisters.

Marshall was a member of the group Almanac with Bennie Maupin (flute, tenor saxophone), Cecil McBee (bass), and Mike Nock (piano). They released one album in 1977.

In the 1980s, he worked in the project Bebop & Beyond, who recorded tribute albums to Dizzy Gillespie and Thelonious Monk.

Marshall underwent heart surgery in 1984, temporary sidelining his career, but he continued to perform on the recorder. He then taught at the San Francisco School of the Arts and issued his second release as a leader in 1999. In the 2000s, he worked on the San Francisco Arts Commission.

Marshall died of a heart attack on September 7, 2011. He was survived by his wife, Sue Trupin; his five sons, Andre, Alcide, Jeru, and David Marshall and Andre Charles; and his stepson, Reevan Trupin.

== Discography ==
=== As leader or co-leader ===
- Dance of the Sun (Timeless Muse, 1977)
- Holy Mischief (Ruddy Duck, 1999)

With Almanac
(Bennie Maupin, Mike Nock, Cecil McBee, Marshall)

- Almanac (Improvising Artists, 1977) – rec.1967

=== As sideman ===
With Toshiko Akiyoshi

- Long Yellow Road (Asahi Sonorama, 1961)
- Toshiko Mariano Quartet (Candid, 1961)

With Kenny Burrell

- Sky Street (Fantasy, 1975)

With John Handy

- Where Go the Boats (Warner Bros., 1978)

With Eddie Harris

- Sounds Incredible (Angelaco, 1980)
- Exploration (Chiaroscuro, 1983)

With Bobby Hutcherson

- Waiting (Blue Note, 1976)
- The View from the Inside (Blue Note, 1976)
- Highway One (Columbia, 1978)
- Conception: The Gift of Love (Columbia, 1979)
- Ambos Mundos (Landmark, 1989)

With Ahmad Jamal

- Genetic Walk (20th Century, 1975)

With John Klemmer

- Waterfalls (Impulse!, 1972)
- Magic and Movement (Impulse!, 1974)

With Art Pepper

- San Francisco Samba (Contemporary, 1977 [1997])

With Archie Shepp

- California Meeting: Live on Broadway (Soul Note, 1985)

With Sonny Simmons

- Manhattan Egos (Arhoolie, 1969 [2000])

With Paul Contos Group

- Points Unknown (Park Ave, 1984)
