= Bobby Hutcherson =

American jazz vibraphone and marimba player (1941–2016)

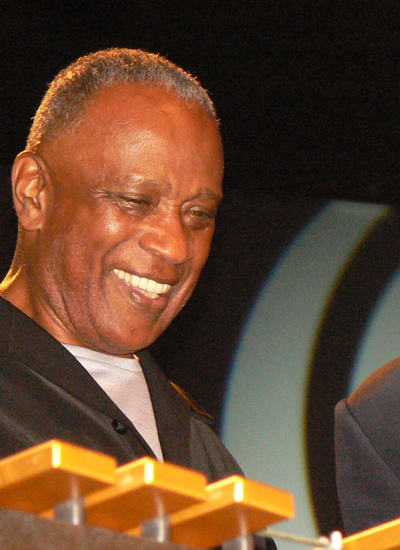
- Hutcherson at the 2007 JazzBaltica Festival

Background information
- Born: January 27, 1941; Los Angeles, California, U.S.
- Died: August 15, 2016 (aged 75) Montara, California, U.S.
- Genres: Jazz fusion; latin jazz; post-bop; hard bop; West Coast jazz; soul jazz
- Occupations: Musician; composer
- Instruments: Vibraphone; marimba
- Years active: 1961–2016

Robert Hutcherson (January 27, 1941 – August 15, 2016) was an American jazz vibraphone and marimba player. "Little B's Poem", from the 1966 Blue Note album Components, is one of his best-known compositions. Hutcherson influenced younger vibraphonists including Steve Nelson, Joe Locke, and Stefon Harris.

== Biography ==
=== Early life and career ===
Bobby Hutcherson was born in Los Angeles, California, to Eli, a master mason, and Esther, a hairdresser. Hutcherson was exposed to jazz by his brother Teddy, who listened to Art Blakey records in the family home with his friend Dexter Gordon. His older sister Peggy was a singer in Gerald Wilson's orchestra. Hutcherson went on to record on a number of Gerald Wilson's Pacific Jazz recordings as well as play in his orchestra. Hutcherson's sister personally introduced Hutcherson to Eric Dolphy (her boyfriend at the time) and Billy Mitchell. Hutcherson was inspired to take up the vibraphone when at about the age of 12 he heard Milt Jackson with Thelonious Monk, Percy Heath, Kenny Clarke and Miles Davis playing "Bemsha Swing" on the Miles Davis All Stars, Volume 2 album (1954). Still in his teens, Hutcherson began his professional career in the late 1950s working with tenor saxophonist Curtis Amy and trumpeter Carmell Jones, as well as with Dolphy and tenor saxophonist Charles Lloyd at Pandora's Box on the Sunset Strip.

He made his recording debut on August 3, 1960, cutting two songs for a 7-inch single with the Les McCann trio for Pacific Jazz (released in 1961), followed by the LP Groovin' Blue with the Curtis Amy-Frank Butler sextet on December 10 (also released by Pacific Jazz in 1961). In January 1962, Hutcherson joined the Billy Mitchell–Al Grey group for dates at The Jazz Workshop in San Francisco and Birdland in New York City (opposite Art Blakey). After touring with the Mitchell–Grey group for a year, Hutcherson settled in New York City (on 165th street in The Bronx) where he worked part-time as a taxi driver, before fully entering the jazz scene via his childhood friend, bassist Herbie Lewis.

=== Blue Note Records ===
Lewis was working with The Jazztet and hosted jam sessions at his apartment. After hearing Hutcherson play at one of Lewis' events, Jazztet and Jackie McLean band member Grachan Moncur III felt that Hutcherson would be a good fit for McLean's group, which led to Hutcherson's first recording for Blue Note Records on April 30, 1963, McLean's One Step Beyond. This was quickly followed by sessions for Blue Note with Moncur, Dolphy, Gordon, Andrew Hill, Tony Williams and Grant Green in 1963 and 1964, later followed by sessions with Joe Henderson, John Patton, Duke Pearson and Lee Morgan. In spite of the numerous post-bop, and free jazz recordings made during this period, Hutcherson's first session for Blue Note as leader, The Kicker (recorded in 1963 but not released until 1999), demonstrated his background in hard bop and the blues, as did Idle Moments with Grant Green.

Hutcherson won the "Talent Deserving of Wider Recognition" award in the 1964 Down Beat readers' poll, and Blue Note released Hutcherson's Dialogue in 1965. The 1966 record Stick-Up!, featuring Joe Henderson, Herbie Lewis, and Billy Higgins, was the first of many recorded sessions Hutcherson made with McCoy Tyner throughout their careers. Stick-Up! was also the only album out of ten Hutcherson recorded as leader for Blue Note between 1965 and 1969 which did not feature drummer Joe Chambers or any of Chambers' compositions. Spanning the years 1963 to 1977, Hutcherson had one of the longest recording careers with Blue Note, second only to Horace Silver's.

=== Return to the West Coast ===
Hutcherson lost his cabaret card and taxi driver's license in 1967 after he and Joe Chambers were arrested for marijuana possession in Central Park, so he moved back to California, but continued to record for Blue Note. This return to the West Coast resulted in an important partnership with Harold Land, with whom Hutcherson recorded seven albums for Blue Note, featuring a rotating lineup of pianists such as Chick Corea, Stanley Cowell, and Joe Sample, and usually Chambers on drums. The Hutcherson-Land group broke up in 1971, and that same year Hutcherson won the title of "World's Best Vibist" in the International Jazz Critics Poll. He recorded and released a Latin jazz album, Montara, in 1975. After the release of Knucklebean in 1977, Hutcherson recorded three albums for Columbia Records in the late 1970s.

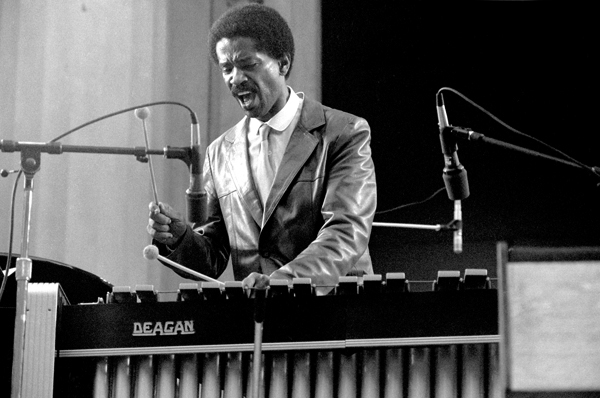
Hutcherson performing at the Berkeley Jazz Festival in 1982.

Land and Hutcherson reunited in the early 1980s for several recordings as the "Timeless All Stars," a sextet featuring Curtis Fuller, Cedar Walton, Buster Williams, and Billy Higgins which recorded four albums for the Dutch label Timeless Records. After switching between several labels in the early 1980s for his solo material, Hutcherson recorded eight albums for Landmark Records from the 1980s into the early 1990s, and continued to work steadily as a sideman during this time. His recorded output slowed somewhat during the past few decades, although he did release albums for Atlantic and Verve in the 1990s, three for the Swiss-based label Kind of Blue in the 21st century, and continued to tour.

=== Later years ===
In 2004, Hutcherson became an inaugural member of the SFJAZZ Collective, featuring Joshua Redman, Miguel Zenón, Nicholas Payton, Renee Rosnes, and Eric Harland, among others. He toured with them for four years, and made an appearance at the SFJAZZ Center's grand opening in 2013. His 2007 quartet included Renee Rosnes on piano, Dwayne Burno on bass and Al Foster on drums. His 2008 quartet included Joe Gilman on piano, Glenn Richman on bass and Eddie Marshall on drums. In 2010 he received the lifetime Jazz Master Fellowship Award from the National Endowment for the Arts and performed at Birdland in a quintet featuring Gilman, Burno, Marshall, and Peter Bernstein. 2014 saw Hutcherson return to Blue Note Records with Enjoy the View, recorded at Ocean Way Studios in Hollywood with Joey DeFrancesco, David Sanborn, and Billy Hart. The quartet performed four sold-out shows at the SFJAZZ Center in February, prior to the album's release.

== Acting career ==
Hutcherson's intermittent acting career included an appearance as the bandleader in They Shoot Horses, Don't They? (1969), and as Ace in Round Midnight (1986).

== Personal life ==
Hutcherson has a son, Barry, from his first marriage to Beth Buford. Hutcherson wrote the waltz "Little B's Poem" for Barry in 1962. Due to the success of "Ummh" from the album San Francisco, one of Hutcherson's few entries in the jazz fusion style, he was able to buy an acre of land on which he built a house in Montara, California, in 1972. That same year, he married Rosemary Zuniga, a ticket taker at the Both/And club in San Francisco. The couple had a son, Teddy, who is a production manager for SFJAZZ. Hutcherson attended an African Methodist Episcopal Church as a youth and converted to Catholicism later in life.

A heavy smoker all his life, Hutcherson had suffered from emphysema since 2007. He died from the condition in Montara, California, on August 15, 2016.

== Style and critical reception ==
Bobby's thorough mastery of harmony and chords combined with his virtuosity and exploratory intuition enabled him to fulfill the function that is traditionally allocated to the piano and also remain a voice in the front line. He did this to perfection in the bands of Dolphy, McLean, and Archie Shepp. His approach to the vibes was all encompassing; it was pianistic in the sense of melody and harmony and percussive in rhythmic attack and placement. He brought a fire and a passion back into the instrument that had been lost since the prime of Lionel Hampton. He was firmly rooted in the bebop tradition, but constantly experimenting and expanding upon that tradition.

— Michael Cuscuna

I love playing with Bobby. He's an exceptionally gifted jazz improviser.... It's always a lot of fun to play with him, always enlightening, emotional as well as intellectually challenging. Bobby is a very honest person. He couldn't play the way he does without that honesty. He has an innocence that's childlike in a way. He's a great player and a great person, and that helps boost humanity a little bit.

— Sonny Rollins

AllMusic contributor Steve Huey stated that Hutcherson's "free-ringing, open chords and harmonically advanced solos were an important part of Dolphy's 1964 masterwork Out to Lunch!", and called Dialogue a "classic of modernist post-bop", declaring Hutcherson "one of jazz's greatest vibraphonists". Huey went on to say: "along with Gary Burton, the other seminal vibraphone talent of the '60s, Hutcherson helped modernize his instrument by redefining what could be done with it – sonically, technically, melodically, and emotionally. In the process, he became one of the defining (if underappreciated) voices in the so-called "new thing" portion of Blue Note's glorious '60s roster."

In his liner notes to the 1980 release of Medina, record producer Richard Seidel (Verve, Sony Masterworks) wrote that "of all the vibists to appear on the scene contemporaneous with Hutcherson, none have been able to combine the rhythmic dexterity, emotive attack and versatile musical interests that Bobby possesses." Seidel concurred that Hutcherson was "part of the vanguard of the new jazz developments in the Sixties. He contributed mightily to several of the key sessions that document these developments."

Interviewed by Jesse Hamlin for a piece on Hutcherson in the San Francisco Chronicle in 2012, collaborator Joshua Redman said that "We talk a lot about how music expresses universal values, experiences and feelings. But you don't often witness that so clearly and so profoundly as you do with Bobby. His music expresses the joy of living. He connects to the source of what music is about."

In an April 2013 profile for Down Beat magazine, Dan Ouellette wrote that "Hutcherson took the vibes to a new level of jazz sophistication with his harmonic inventions and his blurring-fast, four-mallet runs... Today, he's the standard bearer of the instrument and has a plenitude of emulators to prove it." Ouellette quoted Joey DeFrancesco as saying "Bobby is the greatest vibes player of all time.... Milt Jackson was the guy, but Bobby took it to the next level. It's like Milt was Charlie Parker, and Bobby was John Coltrane."
