= Blue Black =

Blue Black may refer to:

- Blue Black (album), a 1975 album by jazz pianist Andrew Hill
- Blue Black, member of the Unspoken Heard hip-hop collaboration
- "Blue Black", a song by Heather Nova from her 1994 album Oyster
