= So in Love (disambiguation) =

"So in Love" is a 1948 song by Cole Porter.

So in Love may also refer to:

== Songs ==
- "So in Love" by Curtis Mayfield from the album There's No Place Like America Today (1975)
- "So in Love" (Orchestral Manoeuvres in the Dark song) (1985)
- "So in Love" by Kim Jung Woon, from Love Story in Harvard soundtrack (2004)
- "So in Love" by Jeremy Camp, from Speaking Louder Than Before (2008)
- "So in Love" (Jill Scott song) (2011)
- "So in Love" by Who's Who, from Ulterior Motives (The Lost Album) (2024)

== Albums ==
- So in Love (Andrew Hill album) (1960)
- So in Love (Art Pepper album) (1980)

== See also ==
- "So Much in Love", a 1963 song by The Tymes
