= Time Lines =

Studio album by Andrew Hill
- Released: 2006
- Recorded: June 23–July 18, 2005
- Genre: Jazz
- Length: 65:25
- Label: Blue Note
- Producer: Michael Cuscuna

Andrew Hill chronology
The Day the World Stood Still (2004)	Time Lines (2006)

Time Lines is an album by American jazz pianist Andrew Hill recorded in 2005 and released on the Blue Note label in 2006. The album features Hill's final studio recordings.

== Background ==
The albums contains several tributes. The track "Malachi" is dedicated to fellow Chicagoan musician Malachi Favors, who died in January 2004. Favors played bass on Hill's 1960 debut recording So in Love. The track "For Emilio", commissioned by Chamber Music America, was written in honor of painter Emilio Cruz, who died in December 2004, having also lived in Chicago.

== Reception ==
Professional ratings
Review scores
Source	Rating
Allmusic	3.5/5 stars
The Penguin Guide to Jazz Recordings	3/4 stars

The Allmusic review by Thom Jurek awarded the album 3½ stars and stated "Hill is still every bit the creative and technically gifted musician he was back in the day; perhaps more so... Hill's gift lies in his ability to employ the tradition exactly as he means to, yet he also seems to look for the mystery inherent in the improvisation and the dialogue of musicians with one another... Time Lines is yet another landmark in one of the most astonishing careers in the history of jazz".

== Track listing ==
All compositions by Andrew Hill.

1. "Malachi" - 7:03
2. "Time Lines" - 9:02
3. "Ry Round 1" - 9:00
4. "For Emilio" - 9:40
5. "Whitsuntide" - 8:59
6. "Smooth" - 8:14
7. "Ry Round 2" - 7:55
8. "Malachi" [Solo Piano Version] - 5:32

- Recorded at Bennett Studios, Englewood Cliffs, New Jersey, on June 23 (tracks 3 & 4), June 30 (tracks 1, 2 & 5–7) and July 18 (track 8), 2005.

== Personnel ==
- Andrew Hill - piano
- Greg Tardy - clarinet (tracks 1 & 6), bass clarinet (tracks 3, 4 & 7), tenor saxophone (tracks 2 & 5)
- Charles Tolliver - trumpet (except 8)
- John Hebert - bass (except 8)
- Eric McPherson - drums (except 8)
