= Mosaic Select 23: Andrew Hill-Solo =

Mosaic Select 23: Andrew Hill - solo

Box set by Andrew Hill
- Released: April 24, 2007
- Recorded: August 30, 1978; October 2, 1978; October 12, 1978
- Studio: Fantasy Studios
- Genre: Jazz
- Length: 222:53
- Label: Mosaic; MS-023
- Producer: Ed Michel

Professional ratings
Review scores
Source	Rating
Allmusic	4.5/5 stars

Mosaic Select 23: Andrew Hill is a 3-disc box set of solo recordings by American pianist Andrew Hill for Fantasy Records in 1978. All tracks, with the exception of two, were previously unreleased.

== Track listing ==
All tracks previously unreleased unless otherwise noted. All compositions by Andrew Hill unless otherwise noted.

Disc 1
No.	Title	Length
1.	"Moonlit Monterey"	16:02
2.	"17 Mile Drive"	12:20
3.	"Gone with the Wind" (written by Allie Wrubel and Herbert Magidson)	6:04
4.	"I Remember Clifford" (written by Benny Golson)	4:28
5.	"Moonlit Monterey" (alternative take)	9:01

Disc 2
No.	Title	Length
1.	"California Tinge"	11:43
2.	"Napa Valley Twilight"	10:10
3.	"Above Big Sur"	15:58
4.	"An Afternoon in Berkeley"	12:12
5.	"California Tinge" (first version)	24:35

Disc 3
No.	Title	Length
1.	"From California with Love" (previously released on From California with Love (1979))	20:00
2.	"Reverend Du Bop" (previously released on From California with Love (1979))	18:39
3.	"Pastoral Pittsburg"	10:57
4.	"Pittsburg Impasse"	5:52
