= Point of Departure (Andrew Hill album) =

Studio album by Andrew Hill
- Released: April 1965
- Recorded: March 21, 1964
- Studio: Van Gelder Studio; Englewood Cliffs, New Jersey
- Genre: Avant-garde jazz
- Length: 40:11 (LP); 57:16 (CD reissue)
- Label: Blue Note
- Producer: Alfred Lion

Andrew Hill chronology
Judgment! (1964)	Point of Departure (1965)	Andrew!!! (1968)

Point of Departure is a studio album by American jazz pianist and composer Andrew Hill, recorded in 1964 and released in 1965 on the Blue Note label. It features Hill in a sextet with alto saxophonist Eric Dolphy, tenor saxophonist Joe Henderson, trumpeter Kenny Dorham, bassist Richard Davis and drummer Tony Williams.

Point of Departure was reissued on CD by Blue Note in 1988 and again in 1999 when recording engineer Rudy Van Gelder remastered the album, adding alternate takes of "New Monastery", "Flight 19", and "Dedication".

== Reception ==
Professional ratings
Review scores
Source	Rating
AllMusic	5/5 stars
Down Beat	4/5 stars
Penguin Guide to Jazz	plus crown
Encyclopedia of Popular Music	5/5 stars

The AllMusic review by Thom Jurek calls the album "a stellar date, essential for any representative jazz collection, and a record that, in the 21st century, still points the way to the future for jazz". The Penguin Guide to Jazz gives the album a four-star rating plus a special "crown" accolade, and includes it as part of a selected "Core Collection." "Dedication" was originally titled "Cadaver" and wants to "express a feeling of great loss". The sad aura of the piece was such that, after playing a section of said piece, Dorham teared up a bit.

== Track listing ==
All music is composed by Andrew Hill.

No.	Title	Length
1.	"Refuge"	12:16
2.	"New Monastery"	7:05
3.	"Spectrum"	9:47
4.	"Flight 19"	4:18
5.	"Dedication"	6:45

== Personnel ==
=== Musicians ===
- Kenny Dorham – trumpet
- Eric Dolphy – alto saxophone (1, 2, 3), bass clarinet (3, 4, 5), flute (3)
- Joe Henderson – tenor saxophone (all), flute (3)
- Andrew Hill – piano
- Richard Davis – double bass
- Tony Williams – drums

=== Production ===
- Alfred Lion – production
- Rudy Van Gelder – recording engineering
- Nat Hentoff – liner notes
- Reid Miles – photography, design
