= The Day the World Stood Still =

Live album by Andrew Hill
- Released: 2003
- Recorded: April 23–25 & 27, 2003
- Genre: Jazz
- Length: 69:06
- Label: Stunt Records

Andrew Hill chronology
A Beautiful Day (2002)	The Day the World Stood Still (2003)	Time Lines (2005)

The Day the World Stood Still is an album by American jazz pianist Andrew Hill, a live album recorded in Sweden and Denmark in 2003 and released on the Danish Stunt label. Hill was awarded the 2003 Danish Jazzpar Prize and the album was drawn from a series of concerts to celebrate and showcase Hill's work, featuring his regular trio augmented with guests from Europe.

== Reception ==
Professional ratings
Review scores
Source	Rating
The Penguin Guide to Jazz Recordings	3/4 stars

The All About Jazz review by Rick Bruner stated "Andrew Hill seems to be a point of triangulation connecting Duke Ellington and Thelonious Monk with the free jazz concepts of the sixties. His highly original musical palette is expanded beautifully by this group of highly talented European reed and brass players".

== Track listing ==
All compositions by Andrew Hill

1. "Not Sa No Sa" – 9:41
2. "Flying in the Sky" – 6:08
3. "Ghetto Echoes" – 11:49
4. "Yesterday Tomorrow" – 15:50
5. "Hermano Frere" – 4:52
6. "Do To" – 2:15
7. "When Peace Comes" – 9:25
8. "11/8" – 9:06
9. "When the World Stays Still (Part II)" – 4:48

- Recorded at the Blue Bird Jazzclub, Kristianstad, Sweden on April 23, 2003 (track 9), at the Vaerket, Randers, Denmark on April 24, 2003 (tracks 3, 4 & 8), at the Jive, Vejle, Denmark on April 25, 2003 (tracks 1 & 6), and the Tivoli, Copenhagen, Denmark on April 27, 2003 (tracks 2, 5 & 7)

== Personnel ==
- Andrew Hill – piano
- Thomas Agergaard – flute, tenor saxophone
- Peter Fuglsang – clarinet, bass clarinet, alto saxophone
- Liudas Mockunas – clarinet, bass clarinet, soprano saxophone, baritone saxophone
- Staffan Svensson – trumpet
- Klaus Löhrer – bass trombone, tuba
- Scott Colley – bass
- Nasheet Waits – drums
- Lenora Zenzalai Helm – vocals
