= But Not Farewell =

Studio album by Andrew Hill
- Released: 1991
- Recorded: July 12–13 & September 16, 1990
- Genre: Jazz
- Length: 65:11
- Label: Blue Note

Andrew Hill chronology
Eternal Spirit (1989)	But Not Farewell (1991)	Dreams Come True (1993)

But Not Farewell is an album by American jazz pianist Andrew Hill, recorded in 1990 and released on the Blue Note label in 1991. The album features seven of Hill's original compositions with four performed by his quintet, one duet with saxophonist Greg Osby, and two solo piano pieces.

== Reception ==
Professional ratings
Review scores
Source	Rating
Allmusic	4/5 stars

The Allmusic review by Scott Yanow awarded the album 4 stars and stated "This is a recommended set of stimulating post-bop jazz. Andrew Hill's highly distinctive piano playing and unusual compositions hint at the past while following their own rules".

== Track listing ==
All compositions by Andrew Hill

1. "Westbury" - 7:19
2. "But Not Farewell" - 7:09
3. "Nicodemus" - 8:23
4. "Georgia Ham" - 17:18
5. "Friends" - 5:41
6. "Sunnyside" - 3:41
7. "Gone" - 13:30
- Recorded at Clinton Recording Studio, New York City on July 12 (tracks 1–4), July 13 (track 5) and September 16 (tracks 6 & 7), 1990

== Personnel ==
- Andrew Hill - piano
- Greg Osby - soprano saxophone (tracks 1–3), alto saxophone (tracks 4–5)
- Robin Eubanks - trombone (tracks 1–4)
- Lonnie Plaxico - bass (tracks 1–4)
- Cecil Brooks III - drums (tracks 1–4)
