= Pax (album) =

Studio album by Andrew Hill
- Released: June 6, 2006
- Recorded: February 10, 1965
- Studio: Van Gelder Studio, Englewood Cliffs, NJ
- Genre: Jazz
- Length: 49:50
- Label: Blue Note; Blue Note 58297
- Producer: Alfred Lion

Andrew Hill chronology
Andrew!!! (1965)	Pax (2006)	Compulsion!!!!! (1966)

Pax is a studio album by American jazz pianist Andrew Hill, featuring performances recorded in 1965 but not released on the Blue Note label until 1975 (as part of compilation album One for One). The album features Hill with tenor saxophonist Joe Henderson, trumpeter Freddie Hubbard, bassist Richard Davis and drummer Joe Chambers performing six of his compositions, with one alternate take added to the 2006 CD release.

== Reception ==
Professional ratings
Review scores
Source	Rating
Allmusic	3.5/5 stars
The Penguin Guide to Jazz Recordings	3/4 stars

The Allmusic review by Thom Jurek awarded the album 3½ stars, stating, "this is a semi-rough and wonderfully rowdy Hill date that deserves serious aural exploration".

== Track listing ==
All compositions by Andrew Hill

1. "Eris" – 10:42
2. "Pax" – 7:13
3. "Calliope" – 10:10
4. "Euterpe" – 7:18
5. "Erato" – 4:01
6. "Roots 'n' Herbs" – 3:42
7. "Euterpe" [alternate take] – 6:44

== Personnel ==
- Andrew Hill – piano
- Freddie Hubbard – cornet (tracks 1–4 & 7)
- Joe Henderson – tenor saxophone (tracks 1–4 & 7)
- Richard Davis – bass
- Joe Chambers – drums
