= Jazzpar Prize =

Annual Danish jazz prize

The Jazzpar Prize (established 1990) was an annual Danish jazz prize founded by trumpeter Arnvid Meyer. The winner was chosen from five nominees among internationally recognized performers. The winner received 200,000 Danish crowns and a bronze statue designed by Jørgen Haugen Sørensen. The ceremony was held in Copenhagen in the late spring, and began a week of jazz activities in the capital. The main sponsor for many years was the Scandinavian Tobacco Company. The prize ended in 2005 due to loss of sponsorship. Arnvid Meyer died in 2007.

The candidates were selected by a panel of international critics including Filippo Bianchi (Italian editor of the magazine Musica Jazz and founder of the Europe Jazz Network), Alex Dutilh (French editor of the magazine Jazzman), Peter H. Larsen (Danish journalist, editor, and radio producer), Dan Morgenstern (American jazz historian, author, and editor), Brian Priestley (British editor), and Boris Rabinowitsch (Danish jazz critic).

== Prize winners ==
- 1990 : Muhal Richard Abrams
- 1991 : David Murray - The Jazzpar Prize
- 1992 : Lee Konitz
- 1993 : Tommy Flanagan - Flanagan's Shenanigans
- 1994 : Roy Haynes
- 1995 : Tony Coe
- 1996 : Geri Allen - Some Aspects of Water
- 1997 : Django Bates
- 1998 : Jim Hall
- 1999 : Martial Solal
- 2000 : Chris Potter - This Will Be
- 2001 : Marilyn Mazur
- 2002 : Enrico Rava
- 2003 : Andrew Hill - The Day the World Stood Still
- 2004 : Aldo Romano
