= Dreams Come True (Andrew Hill & Chico Hamilton album) =

Studio album by Andrew Hill and Chico Hamilton
- Released: 2008
- Recorded: March 25–26, 1993
- Studios: Master Sound Astoria Studios, New York
- Genre: Jazz
- Length: 55:26
- Label: Joyous Shout!
- Producer: Andrew Hill

Andrew Hill chronology
But Not Farewell (1990)	Dreams Come True (2008)	Les Trinitaires (1998)

Dreams Come True is an album of duets by American jazz pianist Andrew Hill and drummer Chico Hamilton recorded in 1993 but not released until 2008 on the Joyous Shout! label. The album features four of Hill's original compositions, two by Hamilton and two covers.

== Reception ==
Professional ratings
Review scores
Source	Rating
Down Beat	4/5 stars

The Time Out New York review by Hank Shteamer stated "It’s a major work befitting its fairy-tale title... No pianist achieved a more seamless blend of weirdness and warmth, and few recordings illustrate that as potently as this one".

On All About Jazz Lyn Horton said: "The two instrumentalists nearly partition themselves from one another and the correspondence that occurs between them is thoroughly engaging, intriguing and challenging ... The duo's intention is not to establish synchrony but to discover the groove that surges out of placing musical elements against each other; developing an expressiveness that rises from that coincidence, which is strangely connected".

== Track listing ==
All compositions by Andrew Hill except where noted

1. "Ohho" (Russel Baba) - 8:07
2. "Three Notes & A Brush" (Chico Hamilton) - 7:25
3. "Watch That Dream" - 11:16
4. "And the Drums Sing" (Hamilton) - 4:00
5. "Clifford's Gone" - 3:34
6. "Shaw Nuff" (Dizzy Gillespie, Charlie Parker) - 8:42
7. "Bless That Dream, Maybe Hope" - 3:38
8. "Composition B" - 9:14

== Personnel ==
- Andrew Hill - piano
- Chico Hamilton - drums, tambourine
