= Live at Montreux (Andrew Hill album) =

Live album by Andrew Hill
- Released: 1975
- Recorded: July 20, 1975
- Venue: Montreux Jazz Festival, Switzerland
- Genre: Jazz
- Length: 44:17
- Label: Freedom
- Producer: Michael Cuscuna

Andrew Hill chronology
Divine Revelation (1975)	Live at Montreux (1975)	Nefertiti (1976)

Live at Montreux is an album by American jazz pianist Andrew Hill, a live album of a solo performance recorded at the Montreux Jazz Festival in 1975 and released on the Freedom label. The album features three of Hill's original compositions and one interpretation of a Duke Ellington tune.

== Reception ==
Professional ratings
Review scores
Source	Rating
Allmusic	4/5 stars

The Allmusic review by Ken Dryden awarded the album 4 stars and stated "Andrew Hill hadn't been recording much for a few years by the time of this 1975 concert at the Montreux Jazz Festival, and one wonders why while listening to this very entertaining solo performance".

== Track listing ==
All compositions by Andrew Hill except as indicated

1. "Snake Hip Waltz" - 11:15
2. "Nefertiti" [mistitled "Nefertisis"] - 10:16
3. "Relativity" - 17:56
4. "Come Sunday" (Duke Ellington) - 4:50

- Recorded at the Montreux Jazz Festival, Montreux, Switzerland on July 20, 1975

== Personnel ==
- Andrew Hill - piano
