= Faces of Hope =

Studio album by Andrew Hill
- Released: 1980
- Recorded: June 13–14, 1980
- Genre: Jazz
- Length: 40:18
- Label: Soul Note
- Producer: Giovanni Bonandrini

Andrew Hill chronology
Strange Serenade (1980)	Faces of Hope (1980)	Shades (1986)

Faces of Hope is an album by American jazz pianist Andrew Hill, recorded in 1980 and released on the Italian Soul Note label. The album features three of Hill's original compositions and one interpretation of a Lee Morgan tune.

== Reception ==
Professional ratings
Review scores
Source	Rating
AllMusic	4/5 stars
The Penguin Guide to Jazz	2.5/4 stars

The AllMusic review by Ron Wynn stated: "Sometimes loping, sometimes soaring solo piano from Andrew Hill, one of several impressive releases he made in the '80s. This time, however, it's neither the arrangements nor the songs that score, but Hill's emphatic execution of them".

== Track listing ==
All compositions by Andrew Hill except as indicated

1. "Rob It Mohe" - 14:55
2. "Ceora" (Lee Morgan) - 5:22
3. "Bayside 1" - 15:30
4. "Bayside 2" - 4:31

*Recorded at Barigozzi Studios, Milano, Italy on June 13 & 14, 1980

== Personnel ==
- Andrew Hill - piano
