= Black Fire (album) =

Studio album by Andrew Hill
- Released: End of March/early April 1964
- Recorded: November 8–9, 1963
- Studio: Van Gelder Studio, Englewood Cliffs
- Genre: Post-bop, modal jazz
- Length: 40:43
- Label: Blue Note; BLP 4151 (mono), BST 84151 (stereo)
- Producer: Alfred Lion

Andrew Hill chronology
So in Love (1960)	Black Fire (1964)	Smoke Stack (1963)

Professional ratings
Review scores
Source	Rating
Allmusic	5/5 stars
The Penguin Guide to Jazz Recordings	3.5/4 stars

Black Fire is a studio album by American jazz pianist and composer Andrew Hill, released on Blue Note Records in 1964. It was Hill's debut for the label. Initially, drummer Philly Joe Jones was scheduled to play on the album, but was replaced by Roy Haynes after scheduling issues. The rest of the band consists of tenor saxophonist Joe Henderson and bassist Richard Davis. The Allmusic review by Stephen Thomas Erlewine calls the album "an impressive statement of purpose that retains much of its power decades after its initial release... a modern jazz classic."

== Track listing ==
All compositions by Andrew Hill.

- "Pumpkin" – 5:24
- "Subterfuge" – 8:04
- "Black Fire" – 6:56
- "Cantarnos" – 5:42
- "Tired Trade" – 5:51
- "McNeil Island" – 2:58
- "Land of Nod" – 5:48

Bonus tracks on CD reissue

- "Pumpkin'" [Alternate Take] – 5:16
- "Black Fire" [Alternate Take] – 5:48

== Personnel ==
- Andrew Hill – piano
- Joe Henderson – tenor saxophone
- Richard Davis – bass
- Roy Haynes – drums
