= Jon Ballantyne =

Canadian pianist and composer

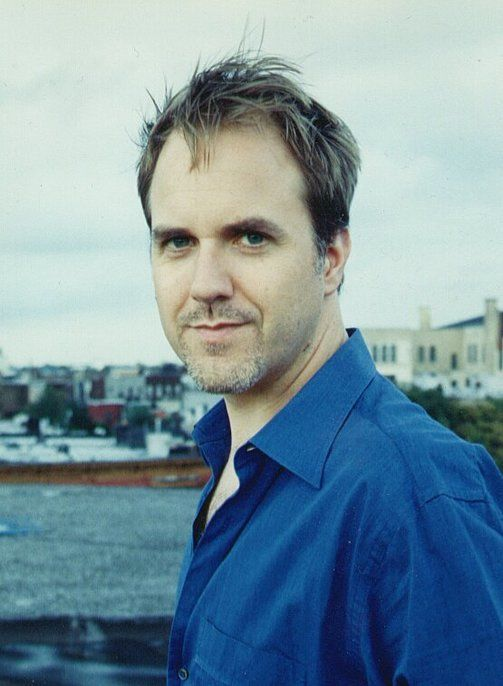
Jon Ballantyne, Brooklyn, 2000

Jon Ballantyne (born in Prince Albert, Saskatchewan, Canada) is a pianist and composer who resides in the New York area.

== Career ==
Ballantyne began playing the piano at an early age and started formal lessons at six. His father, Fred, is a pianist, and both of his parents are jazz enthusiasts who introduced him to recordings by Miles Davis, Thelonious Monk, Bill Evans, and Duke Ellington.

He studied classical piano and played in a garage band during his teenage years. Additionally, he played the tenor saxophone and piano in high school concerts and stage bands at City Park Collegiate Institute in Saskatoon, Saskatchewan.

Ballantyne received a scholarship to North Texas State University, where he attended from 1982 to 1985 and played in the One O'clock Lab Band. In the fall of 1987, he joined the Woody Herman Thundering Herd and later re-joined the band in the late 1990s for various tours in Europe and the United Kingdom.

During the 1990s, he participated in afternoon jam sessions with musicians such as Seamus Blake, Bill Carrothers, Phil Haynes, Donny McCaslin, and others, many of whom were his neighbors.

Ballantyne has conducted educational clinics at institutions including Sibelius Academy in Helsinki, University of Colorado Boulder, University of Northern Colorado, McGill University, University of Toronto, Concordia University, and University of Saskatchewan.

From 1999 to 2006, he led a quartet featuring bassist Boris Kozlov, drummer Jeff Hirshfield, and saxophonist/bass clarinetist Douglas Yates, as well as a trio with Drew Gress and Gene Jackson. He also toured as a solo pianist in the 1990s, 2000s, and most recently in 2014.

In 2013, Ballantyne toured Canada with the Alan Jones Canadian All Star Sextet, which included notable musicians such as Seamus Blake and Ingrid Jensen. He frequently performs at prominent jazz clubs in the Northeastern U.S., including The Deer Head Inn, Small's, Zinc Bar, Cleopatra's Needle, Mezzrow, and Chris's Jazz Cafe. In early 2023, he performed multiple times with the Bill Goodwin Trio at Mezzrow Jazz Club in New York.

Currently, Ballantyne plays in the Bill Goodwin Trio (with bassist Evan Gregor), The Parker Trio (with drummer Adam Nussbaum and bassist Gene Perla), and tenor saxophonist Dan Wilkins' quartet. He also collaborates with guitarist Bill Washer in a duo called the "Mode for Joe Duo," which features the music of Joe Henderson. A live recording of this duo is set to be released in Spring 2024 on the Deer Head Records label, followed by a new trio album titled "Trio It Is" in Summer 2024 on Vector Disc Records, featuring Bill Goodwin and Evan Gregor as a follow-up to their acclaimed 2017 album.

== Discography ==
An asterisk (*) indicates that the year is that of release.

Year recorded	Title	Label	Personnel/Notes
1987*	Trio Jon Ballantyne	Jazzimage	with Terry Clarke, Drums; Jim Vivian, Bass. *JUNO Award Nominated
1988	Sky Dance	Justin Time	Quartet, with Joe Henderson (tenor sax), Neil Swainson (bass), Jerry Fuller (drums) *JUNO Award Winner
1991	A Musing	Justin Time	Some tracks solo piano; most tracks duo, with Paul Bley (piano); some tracks duo with Dave Laing (drums)
1994	The Loose	Justin Time	Trio, with Drew Gress (bass), Billy Hart (drums)
1995	Trio Live	NY Jam	Trio, with Drew Gress (bass), Billy Hart (drums)
1997	Known/Unknown	NY Jam	Trio, with Drew Gress (bass), Gene Jackson (drums)
2000*	Round Again	NY Jam	
2002	"The Banff Session"	Real Artist Works	With Boris Kozlov, Hugh Sicotte
2005	4tets + Dewey Redman	Real Artist Works	With Douglas Yates, Jeff Hirshfield, Gene Jackson, Boris Kozlov; Dewey Redman (sax) added on some tracks
2006*	Avenue Standard	Real Artist Works	Solo Piano *JUNO Award Winner
2006	Ever Since Now	Real Artist Works	Solo Piano
2012*	Twenty Accident Free Workdays	Real Artist Works	With Hugh Sicotte *JUNO AwardNominated
2016	"Live at Porter's" (*Unreleased, 2024 release imminent)	with Bill Goodwin, Drums; Tony Marino, Bass: Jon Ballantyne, Electric Piano	
2017	"Trio"	Vector Disc Records	With Bill Goodwin, leader, drums; Evan Gregor, bass
2020	"Duaxis"	Real Artist Works	With Devin Gray
2021	"The Parker Trio"	PM Records	with Gene Perla, Adam Nussbaum
2024	"The Mode for Joe Duo, Live at the Deer Head Inn"	Deer Head Records	Bill Washer, Jon Ballantyne
2024	"Trio It Is"	Vector Disc Records (to be released Fall of 2024)	with Bill Goodwin, Drums; Evan Gregor, Bass

== Filmography ==
- In the Key of Eh! Canadian Jazz Piano (1996)
- DUOS: The Jazz Sessions (1999)
- SOLOS: The Jazz Sessions (Bravo! Canada, 2006)
- "Oh Canada": presenting Canadian Jazz Artists (PBS, 2016)
