= Piano Español =

Studio album by Lalo Schifrin
- Released: 1959
- Recorded: 1959; New York City
- Genre: Jazz
- Length: 31:40
- Label: Tico; Tico 1070

Lalo Schifrin chronology
Spectrum (1957)	Piano Español (1959)	Piano, Strings and Bossa Nova (1962)

Lalolé: The Latin Sound of Lalo Schifrin Cover

Professional ratings
Review scores
Source	Rating
Allmusic	3/5 stars

Piano Español is an album by Argentine composer, pianist and conductor Lalo Schifrin recorded in 1959 and originally released on the Tico label. The album was rereleased in 1968 on the Roulette label as Lalolé: The Latin Sound of Lalo Schifrin.

== Track listing ==
1. "Frenesi" (Alberto Domínguez) - 3:24
2. "The Breeze and I" (Ernesto Lecuona, Al Stillman) - 2:51
3. "Capricho Español" (Enrique Granados) - 3:25
4. "My Shawl" (Xavier Cugat, Pedro Berrios) - 2:49
5. "Caravan" (Juan Tizol) - 3:17
6. "Malagueña" (Ernesto Lecuona) - 2:13
7. "Cha Cha Cha Flamenco" (Mario de Jesús) - 2:56
8. "Warsaw Concerto" (Richard Addinsell) - 2:02
9. "Hullabalues" (Lalo Schifrin, Ralph Seijo) - 3:11
10. "Jungle Fantasy" (Esy Morales) - 2:34
11. "All the Things You Are" (Oscar Hammerstein II, Jerome Kern) - 3:18
12. "El Cumbanchero" (Rafael Hernández) - 2:36
- Recorded in New York City in 1959

== Personnel ==
- Lalo Schifrin - piano, arranger, conductor
- Unidentified trumpets, saxophones, bass clarinet, oboe, bongos, harp and strings
