= Invitation (Andrew Hill album) =

Studio album by Andrew Hill
- Released: 1975
- Recorded: October 17, 1974
- Genre: Jazz
- Length: 57:56
- Label: SteepleChase

Andrew Hill chronology
One for One (1965-70)	Invitation (1975)	Spiral (1974-75)

Invitation is an album by American jazz pianist Andrew Hill, recorded in 1974 and released on the Danish SteepleChase label. The album features five of Hill's original compositions and one jazz standard performed by Hill in a trio with bassist Christopher White and drummer Art Lewis. The CD added an alternate take as a bonus track.

== Reception ==
Professional ratings
Review scores
Source	Rating
Allmusic	4/5 stars
The Penguin Guide to Jazz Recordings	3/4 stars

The Allmusic review by Ken Dryden awarded the album 4 stars stating "Such fascinating music will be of great interest to fans of Andrew Hill".

== Track listing ==
All compositions by Andrew Hill except as indicated

1. "Catfish" – 6:31
2. "Lost No More" – 5:23
3. "Morning Flower" – 12:19
4. "Invitation" (Bronisław Kaper) – 8:40
5. "Laverne" – 7:33
6. "Little John" – 6:51
7. "Catfish" [alternate take] – 10:39 Bonus track on CD

- Recorded at Minot Sound Studios, White Plains, New York on October 17, 1974

== Personnel ==
- Andrew Hill – piano
- Chris White – bass
- Art Lewis – drums
