= One for One (Andrew Hill album) =

1976 compilation album by Andrew Hill

Compilation album by Andrew Hill
- Released: 1975
- Recorded: February 10, 1965 (#7–11); August 1, 1969 (#4–6); January 16, 1970 (#1–2); January 23, 1970 (#3)
- Studio: Van Gelder Studio, Englewood Cliffs, NJ
- Genre: Jazz
- Length: 80:02
- Label: Blue Note; BN-LA459-H2
- Producer: Francis Wolff (#1–6); Alfred Lion (#7–11)

Andrew Hill chronology
Passing Ships (1969)	One for One (1975)	Invitation (1974)

One for One is a compilation album of previously unissued studio tracks by American jazz pianist Andrew Hill, featuring performances recorded in 1965, 1969 and 1970 but not released on the Blue Note label until 1975 as a double LP. It features eleven of Hill's compositions: tracks 7–11 would later be released on The Complete Blue Note Andrew Hill Sessions (1963–66) in 1995 (and in 2006 as Pax); tracks 1–6 would be featured on Mosaic Select 16: Andrew Hill only in 2005.

== Reception ==
Professional ratings
Review scores
Source	Rating
Allmusic	4/5 stars

The Allmusic review by Scott Yanow awarded the album 4 stars stating "Andrew Hill's music and piano playing, which is not easily classified (the term "avant-garde" does not do him justice), not too surprisingly never caught on with a wider audience, although it still sounds quite fresh and unpredictable today... and they certainly challenge these major players — no coasting allowed".

== Track listing ==
All compositions by Andrew Hill

1. "One for One" [a.k.a. "Ocho Rios"] – 10:29
2. "Diddy Wah" – 6:50
3. "Without Malice" [a.k.a. "Cascade"] – 4:52
4. "Poinsettia" – 6:24
5. "Illusion" – 7:00
6. "Fragments" – 5:03
7. "Euterpe" – 7:18
8. "Erato" – 4:01
9. "Pax" – 7:13
10. "Eris" – 10:42
11. "Calliope" – 10:10

== Personnel ==
- Andrew Hill – piano
- Bennie Maupin – flute (track 1 & 4), tenor saxophone (tracks 5 & 6)
- Pat Patrick – flute (track 1), alto clarinet (track 2), alto saxophone (tracks 1 & 3)
- Charles Tolliver – trumpet (tracks 1–3)
- Freddie Hubbard – cornet (tracks 7 & 9–11)
- Joe Henderson – tenor saxophone (tracks 7 & 9–11)
- Ron Carter (tracks 1–6), Richard Davis (tracks 7–11) – bass
- Joe Chambers (tracks 7–11), Paul Motian (tracks 1 & 2), Mickey Roker (tracks 4–6), Ben Riley (track 3) – drums
- Sanford Allen – violin (tracks 4–6)
- Alfred Brown, Selwart Clarke – viola (tracks 4–6)
- Kermit Moore – cello (tracks 4–6)
