= Verona Rag =

Studio album by Andrew Hill
- Released: 1987
- Recorded: July 5, 1986
- Studio: Jingle Machine Studios, Milan
- Genre: Jazz
- Length: 47:59
- Label: Soul Note
- Producer: Giovanni Bonandrini

Andrew Hill chronology
Shades (1986)	Verona Rag (1987)	Eternal Spirit (1989)

Verona Rag is an album by American jazz pianist Andrew Hill recorded in 1986 and released on the Italian Soul Note label in 1987. The solo album features three of Hill's original compositions and two jazz standards.

== Reception ==
Professional ratings
Review scores
Source	Rating
AllMusic	4.5/5 stars
The Penguin Guide to Jazz	3.5/4 stars

The AllMusic review by Scott Yanow awarded the album 4½ stars and stated "Hill, a true individualist, embodies the best in creative jazz".

== Track listing ==
All compositions by Andrew Hill except as indicated

1. "Retrospect" - 14:25
2. "Darn That Dream" (Eddie DeLange, Jimmy Van Heusen) - 6:14
3. "Verona Rag" - 16:33
4. "Tinkering" - 4:22
5. "Afternoon in Paris" (John Lewis) - 6:25

- Recorded at Jingle Machine Studios, Milan, Italy on July 5, 1986

== Personnel ==
- Andrew Hill - piano
