= Nefertiti (Andrew Hill album) =

Studio album by Andrew Hill
- Released: 1976
- Recorded: January 25, 1976
- Studio: Vanguard Studios, New York City
- Genre: Free jazz
- Length: 42:29
- Label: East Wind; EW 8032
- Producer: David Baker

Andrew Hill chronology
| Live at Montreux (1975) | Nefertiti (1976) | From California with Love (1978) |

Nefertiti is an album by American jazz pianist Andrew Hill, recorded in 1976 and originally released on the Japanese East Wind label. The album features six of Hill's original compositions performed by a trio.

== Reception ==
Professional ratings
Review scores
| Source | Rating |
|---|---|
| Allmusic | 4/5 stars |
| The Penguin Guide to Jazz Recordings | 3/4 stars |
| DownBeat | 4/5 stars |

The Allmusic review by Scott Yanow awarded the album 4 stars and stated "although the music seems slightly more conservative than usual for a Hill set, the music is consistently stimulating".

== Track listing ==
All compositions by Andrew Hill

1. "Blue Black" - 14:10
2. "Relativity" - 5:29
3. "Nefertiti" - 8:08
4. "Hattie" - 3:47
5. "Mudflower" - 7:32
6. "Unnatural Man" - 3:23

== Personnel ==
- Andrew Hill - piano
- Richard Davis - bass
- Roger Blank - drums
