= Eddie Khan =

American jazz bassist (born 1935)

Eddie Khan (1935 – 1985 or 1986) was an American jazz bassist who worked extensively with Max Roach, Eric Dolphy, Freddie Hubbard and Andrew Hill.

== Discography ==
=== As sideman ===
- Bill Barron: Modern Windows Suite (Savoy Records, 1961)
- Walter Bishop, Jr: Bish Bash (Xanadu, 1964 [1975])
- Donald Byrd: Blackjack (Blue Note, 1963–1967)
- Joe Henderson: Our Thing (Blue Note, 1963)
- Andrew Hill: Smokestack (Blue Note, 1963)
- Billie Holiday with the Mal Waldron Quartet: At Monterey 58 (Black Hawk, 1958)
- Freddie Hubbard: Breaking Point (Blue Note, 1964)
- Jackie McLean: One Step Beyond (Blue Note)
- Max Roach: Speak, Brother, Speak! (Fantasy, 1962)
- Shirley Scott: Travelin' Light - with Kenny Burrell (Prestige, 1964)

With Eric Dolphy

- Conversations
- The Illinois Concert (Blue Note, 1963)
- Iron Man (Douglas, 1963)

With Slide Hampton

- Jazz with a Twist (Atlantic, 1962)
- Drum Suite (Epic, 1962)

With Charles Lloyd

- Discovery!

With Ronnie Mathews

- Doin' the Thang! (Prestige, 1963)

With Jimmy Witherspoon

- Blue Spoon (Prestige, 1964)
