= The Body & the Soul =

1964 album by Freddie Hubbard

Studio album by Freddie Hubbard
- Released: July 1964
- Recorded: March 11 & May 2, 1963; March 8, 1963
- Studio: Van Gelder, Englewood Cliffs; Capitol, New York City
- Genre: Jazz
- Length: 36:32
- Label: Impulse! A-38
- Producer: Bob Thiele

Freddie Hubbard chronology
| Here to Stay (1962) | The Body & the Soul (1964) | Doin' the Thang! (1963) |

The Body & the Soul is an album by trumpeter Freddie Hubbard recorded in 1963 as his second and last release on the Impulse! label. It features performances by Hubbard with an orchestra and string section, and with a septet featuring Curtis Fuller, Eric Dolphy, Wayne Shorter, Cedar Walton, Reggie Workman and Louis Hayes.

== Reception ==
Professional ratings
Review scores
| Source | Rating |
|---|---|
| AllMusic | 4/5 stars |
| The Penguin Guide to Jazz Recordings | 3/4 stars |

A reviewer for Negro Digest stated: "From the opening track to the last Hubbard establishes and maintains a mood of excellence that literally explodes out to the listener. His solos are pregnant with quality and melody, and his technique is flawless. Unquestionably, this is the best by Freddie Hubbard to date. As for the music itself, it is all mainstream. There is no attempt at far-out-ness. Each tune is easy discernible, being buoyant for the most part with beauty and form". Michael G. Nastos of AllMusic added: "The manner in which this recording is programmed is thoughtful in that it lends to the diversity of the project, but is seamless from track to track. Dan Morgenstern's hefty liner notes also explain the concept behind this ambitious project, one which did not compare to any of Hubbard's other recordings in his career. Therefore it stands alone as one of the most unique productions in his substantive discography, and a quite credible initial go-round for Shorter as an orchestrator".

== Track listing ==
All compositions by Freddie Hubbard except as indicated

1. "Body and Soul" (Johnny Green, Robert Sour, Edward Heyman, Frank Eyton) - 4:39
2. "Carnival (Manhã de Carnaval)" (Luiz Bonfá, Luigi Creatore, Hugo Peretti, George David Weiss) - 5:21
3. "Chocolate Shake" (Duke Ellington, Paul Francis Webster) - 3:58
4. "Dedicated to You" (Sammy Cahn, Saul Chaplin, Hy Zaret) - 3:24
5. "Clarence's Place" - 3:31
6. "Aries" - 3:07
7. "Skylark" (Hoagy Carmichael, Johnny Mercer) - 4:34
8. "I Got It Bad (And That Ain't Good)" (Duke Ellington, Paul Francis Webster) - 3:43
9. "Thermo" - 4:15

Recorded on March 8 (#3, 7–8), March 11 (#2, 6, 9), & May 2 (#1, 4, 5), 1963.

== Personnel ==
1, 4, 5

- Freddie Hubbard - trumpet
- Wayne Shorter - tenor saxophone
- Curtis Fuller - trombone
- Eric Dolphy - alto saxophone, flute
- Cedar Walton - piano
- Reggie Workman - bass
- Louis Hayes - drums

2, 6, 9

- Wayne Shorter - arranger, conductor
- Freddie Hubbard, Clark Terry, Ernie Royal, Al DeRisi - trumpet
- Eric Dolphy - alto saxophone, flute
- Seldon Powell, Jerome Richardson - tenor saxophone
- Charles Davis - baritone saxophone
- Curtis Fuller, Melba Liston - trombone
- Robert Powell - tuba
- Bob Northern - French horn
- Cedar Walton - piano
- Reggie Workman - bass
- Philly Joe Jones - drums

3, 7, 8

- Wayne Shorter - arranger, conductor
- Freddie Hubbard, Ed Armour, Richard Williams - trumpet
- Eric Dolphy - alto saxophone, flute
- Bob Northern, Julius Watkins - French horns
- Curtis Fuller, Melba Liston - trombone
- Jerome Richardson - baritone saxophone
- Cedar Walton - piano
- Reggie Workman - bass
- Philly Joe Jones - drums
- Harry Cykman, Morris Stonzek, Arnold Eidus, Sol Shapiro, Charles McCracken, Harry Katzman, Harry Lookofsky, Gene Orloff, Julius Held, Raoul Poliakin - strings
