= Doin' the Thang! =

Studio album by Ronnie Mathews with Freddie Hubbard
- Released: 1964
- Recorded: December 17, 1963
- Studio: Van Gelder, Englewood Cliffs, New Jersey, United States
- Genre: Jazz
- Length: 34:17
- Label: Prestige; PRLP 7303
- Producer: Ozzie Cadena

Ronnie Mathews chronology
Doin' the Thang! (1964)	Trip to the Orient (1975)

Freddie Hubbard chronology
The Body & the Soul (1963)	Doin' the Thang! (1963)	Breaking Point! (1964)

Doin' the Thang! is the debut album by jazz pianist Ronnie Mathews, featuring trumpeter Freddie Hubbard, recorded for the Prestige label in 1963.

== Reception ==
Professional ratings
Review scores
Source	Rating
AllMusic	4/5 stars

Alex Henderson of AllMusic said that "the LP's focus is modal post-bop and non-soul-jazz hard bop. But even though the material isn't soul-jazz, Mathews' quintet is certainly soulful... Hubbard, who was only 25 when Doin' the Thang was recorded, brings a lot to the session – not only fire, guts, and passion, but also a big, highly appealing tone".

== Track listing ==
All compositions by Ronnie Mathews except where noted

1. "The Thang" – 8:02
2. "Ichi Ban" – 3:37
3. "The Orient" – 5:55
4. "Let's Get Down" – 5:14
5. "Prelude to a Kiss" (Duke Ellington, Irving Gordon, Irving Mills) – 5:32
6. "1239-A" (Charles Davis) – 5:57

== Personnel ==
- Ronnie Mathews – piano
- Freddie Hubbard – trumpet
- Charles Davis – baritone saxophone
- Eddie Khan – bass
- Albert Heath – drums

Production

- Ozzie Cadena – producer
- Rudy Van Gelder – engineer
