= Piano, Strings and Bossa Nova =

Studio album by Lalo Schifrin
- Released: 1962
- Recorded: October 23 & 24, 1962; New York City
- Genre: Jazz
- Length: 28:18
- Label: MGM; E-4110
- Producer: Creed Taylor

Lalo Schifrin chronology
Piano Español (1962)	Piano, Strings and Bossa Nova (1962)	Samba Para Dos (1963)

Professional ratings
Review scores
Source	Rating
Down Beat	4/5 stars
Allmusic	3/5 stars

Piano, Strings and Bossa Nova is an album by Argentine composer, pianist and conductor Lalo Schifrin recorded in 1962 and released on the MGM label.

== Track listing ==
All compositions by Lalo Schifrin except as indicated

1. "The Wave" - 2:43
2. "Insensatez" (Vinicius de Moraes, Antonio Carlos Jobim) - 2:22
3. "You and Me (Voce e Eu)" (de Moraes, Carlos Lyra) - 1:48
4. "Lalo's Bossa Nova (Samba Para Dos)" - 2:17
5. "Silvia" - 3:11
6. "Murmurio" (Luiz Antonio, Djaima Ferreira) - 2:01
7. "Maria" (Leonard Bernstein, Stephen Sondheim) - 2:29
8. "Rapaz de Bem" (Johnny Alf) - 2:34
9. "Samba Do Perroquet (Parrot Samba)" (Ferreira, Ivono Rebella) - 2:04
10. "Rio After Dark" - 2:33
11. "Time for Love" (Leonard Feather) - 2:26
12. "Four Leaf Clover" (Harry M. Woods, Mort Dixon) - 1:50
- Recorded in New York City on October 23 (tracks 1–6) and October 24 (tracks 7–12), 1962

== Personnel ==
- Lalo Schifrin - piano, arranger
- Jim Hall - guitar
- Christopher White - bass
- Rudy Collins - drums
- Jose Paulo, Carmen Costa - Latin percussion
- Unidentified harp and strings
