= Andrew!!! =

Studio album by Andrew Hill
- Released: Early April 1968
- Recorded: June 25, 1964
- Studio: Van Gelder Studio, Englewood Cliffs, NJ
- Genre: Post bop, avant-garde jazz
- Length: 39:36 (LP); 51:03 (CD)
- Label: Blue Note; BST 84203
- Producer: Alfred Lion

Andrew Hill chronology
Point of Departure (1964)	Andrew!!! (1968)	Pax (1965)

Professional ratings
Review scores
Source	Rating
Allmusic	4/5 stars
DownBeat	4.5/5 stars
The Penguin Guide to Jazz Recordings	3.5/4 stars

Andrew!!! is a studio album by American jazz pianist Andrew Hill recorded for Blue Note Records in 1964, but not released until April 1968, and subsequently reissued on CD in 2005 with two alternate takes. It features Hill with vibraphonist Bobby Hutcherson, bassist Richard Davis and drummer Joe Chambers, along with tenor saxophonist John Gilmore, in a rare session away from the Sun Ra Arkestra.

== Track listing ==
All compositions by Andrew Hill

1. "The Griots" – 6:04
2. "Black Monday" – 8:55
3. "Duplicity" – 6:11
4. "Le Serpent Qui Danse" – 6:55
5. "No Doubt" – 4:23
6. "Symmetry" – 7:08
7. "The Griots" [alternate] – 5:06
8. "Symmetry" [alternate] – 6:31

== Personnel ==
- Andrew Hill – piano
- John Gilmore – tenor saxophone
- Bobby Hutcherson – vibraphone
- Richard Davis – double-bass
- Joe Chambers – drums

== Charts ==
Chart performance for Andrew!!!
Chart (2025)	Peak position
Greek Albums (IFPI)	75
