= Passing Ships =

Studio album by Andrew Hill
- Released: October 21, 2003
- Recorded: November 7 and 14, 1969
- Studio: Van Gelder Studio, Englewood Cliffs, NJ
- Genre: Jazz
- Length: 45:38
- Label: Blue Note; Blue Note 90417
- Producer: Francis Wolff

Andrew Hill chronology
| Lift Every Voice (1969-70) | Passing Ships (2003) | One for One (1965-70) |

Passing Ships is a studio album by American jazz pianist Andrew Hill featuring performances recorded in 1969 for the Blue Note label but not released until 2003. The album features Hill with a six-piece horn section performing seven original compositions.

== Reception ==
Professional ratings
Review scores
| Source | Rating |
|---|---|
| Allmusic | 4.5/5 stars |
| The Penguin Guide to Jazz Recordings | 3/4 stars |

The Allmusic review by Thom Jurek awarded the album 4½ stars and stated "The music here is ambitious. Hill's scoring for one reed, two trumpets, and low brass is remarkable for the time".

== Track listing ==
All compositions by Andrew Hill

1. "Sideways" - 4:09
2. "Passing Ships" - 7:08
3. "Plantation Bag" - 8:32
4. "Noon Tide" - 9:49
5. "The Brown Queen" - 6:22
6. "Cascade" - 6:27
7. "Yesterday's Tomorrow" - 5:11

Recorded on November 7 (tracks 2, 5 & 6) and November 14 (tracks 1, 3, 4 & 7), 1969.

== Personnel ==
- Andrew Hill - piano
- Dizzy Reece - trumpet (solo on tracks 1, 3, 4) Woody Shaw - trumpet (solo on tracks 2, 5–7)
- Joe Farrell - alto flute, English horn, bass clarinet, soprano saxophone, tenor saxophone
- Howard Johnson - bass clarinet, tuba
- Robert Northern - french horn
- Julian Priester - trombone
- Ron Carter - bass
- Lenny White - drums
