= Eternal Spirit =

Studio album by Andrew Hill
- Released: 1989
- Recorded: January 30–31, 1989
- Studio: Rudy Van Gelder Studio, Englewood Cliffs, New Jersey
- Genre: Jazz
- Length: 48:43
- Label: Blue Note
- Producer: Michael Cuscuna

Andrew Hill chronology
Verona Rag (1986)	Eternal Spirit (1989)	But Not Farewell (1990)

Eternal Spirit is an album by American jazz pianist Andrew Hill, recorded in 1989 and released on the Blue Note label. The album features six of Hill's original compositions performed by his quintet with alto saxophonist Greg Osby, vibraphonist Bobby Hutcherson, bassist Rufus Reid and drummer Ben Riley. Three alternate takes were added to the CD release as bonus tracks.

== Reception ==
Professional ratings
Review scores
Source	Rating
Allmusic	4.5/5 stars

The Allmusic review by Scott Yanow awarded the album 4½ stars and stated "There are no weak performances on this superb post bop effort, Andrew Hill's strongest recording in several years".

== Track listing ==
All compositions by Andrew Hill

1. "Pinnacle" - 9:53
2. "Golden Sunset" - 10:20
3. "Samba Rasta" - 4:50
4. "Tail Feather" - 6:16
5. "Spiritual Lover" - 7:43
6. "Bobby's Tune" - 8:41
7. "Pinnacle" [alternate take] - 7:29 Bonus track on CD
8. "Golden Sunset" [alternate take] - 5:12 Bonus track on CD
9. "Spiritual Lover" [alternate take] - 6:44 Bonus track on CD
- Recorded at Rudy Van Gelder Studio, Englewood Cliffs, New Jersey on January 30 (tracks 4 & 6–9) and January 31 (tracks 1–3 & 5), 1989

== Personnel ==
- Andrew Hill - piano
- Greg Osby - alto saxophone
- Bobby Hutcherson - vibes
- Rufus Reid - bass
- Ben Riley - drums
