= Strange Serenade =

Studio album by Andrew Hill
- Released: 1980
- Recorded: June 13–14, 1980
- Genre: Jazz
- Length: 41:59
- Label: Soul Note
- Producer: Giovanni Bonandrini

Andrew Hill chronology
From California with Love (1979)	Strange Serenade (1980)	Faces of Hope (1980)

Strange Serenade is an album by American jazz pianist and composer Andrew Hill, recorded in June 1980 and released later that year on the Italian label Soul Note.The album includes three of Hill's original compositions and one written by Laverne Hill performed by a trio.

== Reception ==
Professional ratings
Review scores
Source	Rating
Allmusic	4/5 stars
The Penguin Guide to Jazz Recordings	3/4 stars

The Allmusic review by Ron Wynn awarded the album 4 stars, stating, "Hill enters the '80s on a stirring trio note."

The Penguin Guide to Jazz Recordings awarded the album 3 stars and noted, "This is as dour and dark as anything Hill has committed to record. Silva and Waits are ideal partners in music that isn't so much minor-key as surpassingly ambiguous in its harmonic language."

== Track listing ==
All compositions by Andrew Hill except as indicated

1. "Mist Flower" - 15:26
2. "Strange Serenade" - 7:03
3. "Reunion" - 8:50
4. "Andrew" (Laverne Hill) - 10:40

- Recorded at Barigozzi Studios, Milano, Italy on June 13 & 14, 1980

== Personnel ==
- Andrew Hill - piano
- Alan Silva - bass
- Freddie Waits - drums
