= The Jazzpar Prize (album) =

Studio album by David Murray & Pierre Dørge's New Jungle Orchestra
- Released: 1992
- Recorded: March 16–17, 1991
- Genre: Jazz
- Length: 54:20
- Label: Enja
- Producer: Horst Weber

David Murray chronology
David Murray Big Band (1991)	The Jazzpar Prize (1992)	Blue Monk (1991)

The Jazzpar Prize is an album by Pierre Dørge's New Jungle Orchestra with David Murray released on the Enja label in recognition of the awarding of the 1991 Danish Jazzpar Prize to Murray. The album was recorded in 1991 and released in 1992 and features performances by Murray, Pierre Dørge, Horace Parlan, Harry Beckett, Per Jörgensen, Jörg Huke, Jesper Zeuthen, Jacob Mygind, Irene Becker, Jens Skou Olsen, and Audun Kleive.

After Muhal Richard Abrams, who has the first recipient in 1990, Murray was chosen by a committee made up of Dan Morgenstern, Gary Giddins (USA), Philippe Carles (France), Bert Noglik (Germany), and Erik Wiedemann (Denmark). The band invited to accompany Murray was Pierre Dørge's New Jungle Orchestra; their first concert was March 13, 1991, in Copenhagen, repeated in Odense and Aarhus, before they made the studio recordings in Copenhagen.

== Reception ==
The Allmusic review by Scott Yanow awarded the album 4.5 stars, stating: "The performances are avant-garde, but not afraid of using melodies and straight-ahead rhythms when it best suits the music."

Professional ratings
Review scores
Source	Rating
Allmusic	4.5/5 stars
The Penguin Guide to Jazz Recordings	3/4 stars

== Track listing ==
1. "Do Green Ants Dream?" (Dorge) - 9:01
2. "David in Wonderland" (Dorge) - 7:18
3. "Gospel Medley" - 6:16
4. "In a Sentimental Mood" (Ellington, Kurtz, Mills) - 9:23
5. "Shakill's Warrior" - 12:26
6. "Song for Doni" - 10:11

All compositions by David Murray except as indicated.
- Recorded March 16–17, 1991

== Personnel ==
- David Murray - tenor saxophone, bass clarinet
- Pierre Dørge - guitar
- Horace Parlan - piano
- Harry Beckett - trumpet, flugelhorn
- Per Jörgensen - trumpet
- Jörg Huke - trombone
- Jesper Zeuthen - alto saxophone, bass clarinet
- Jacob Mygind - tenor saxophone, soprano saxophone
- Irene Becker - piano
- Jens Skou Olsen - bass
- Audun Kleive - drums
- Donald Murray: vocals on "Gospel Medley"
