= John Gilmore (musician) =

American jazz musician

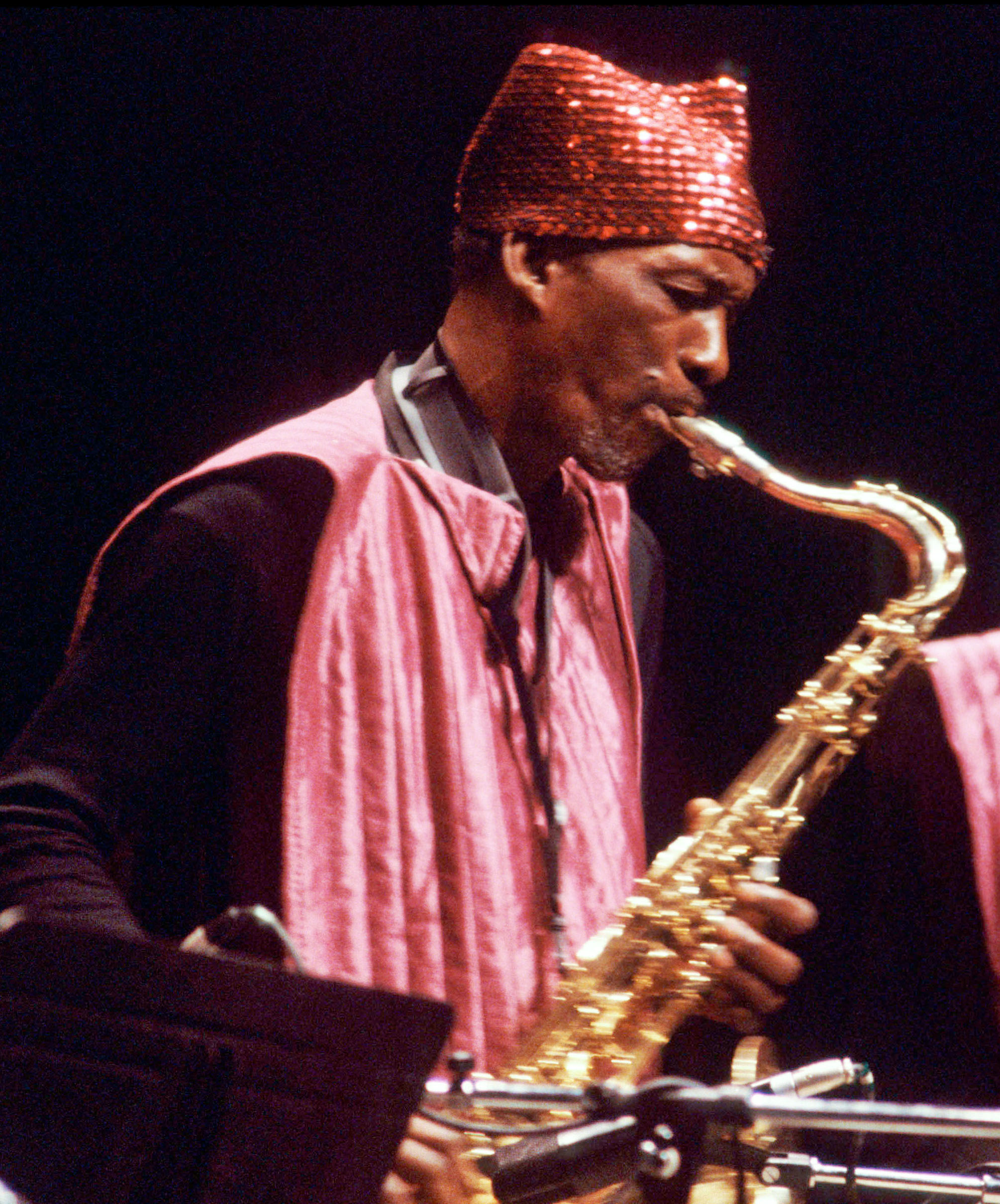

Background information
- Born: John Gilmore; September 28, 1931; Summit, Mississippi, U.S.
- Died: August 20, 1995 (aged 63) Philadelphia, Pennsylvania, U.S.
- Genres: Avant-garde jazz, Bebop, Free jazz, Post-bop
- Occupations: Musician, composer
- Instruments: Tenor saxophone, drum set, bass clarinet
- Years active: 1952–1995

John Gilmore (September 28, 1931 – August 20, 1995) was an American jazz saxophonist, clarinetist, and percussionist. He was known for his tenure with the avant-garde keyboardist/bandleader Sun Ra from the 1950s to the 1990s, and led The Sun Ra Arkestra from Sun Ra's death in 1993 until his own death in 1995.

== Biography ==
Gilmore was raised in Chicago and played clarinet from the age of 14. He took up the tenor saxophone while serving in the United States Air Force from 1948 through 1951. He then pursued a musical career, beginning as a tenor saxophonist on a national tour with the Harlem Globetrotters in an ensemble that included pianist Earl Hines in 1952.

In 1953 Gilmore met pianist and bandleader Sun Ra who had a profound impact on him as a musician. For the next four decades, he recorded and performed almost exclusively with Sun Ra; first as a trio, and then in the Sun Ra Arkestra. This was puzzling to some, who noted Gilmore's talent, and thought he could be a major star like John Coltrane or Sonny Rollins. Despite being five years older than Gilmore, Coltrane was impressed with his playing, and took informal lessons from Gilmore in the late 1950s. Coltrane's epochal, proto–free jazz "Chasin' the Trane" was inspired partly by Gilmore's sound. The Penguin Guide to Jazz suggests Gilmore remained an influence in Coltrane's later period, particularly on Sun Ship.

In the late 1950s Gilmore co-led a band with Clifford Jordan while simultaneously playing with Arkestra. In 1957 this ensemble recorded a Blue Note session which resulted in the album Blowing in from Chicago. The rhythm section featured Horace Silver, Curly Russell, and Art Blakey. During this period Gilmore also performed with jazz drummer Wilbur Campbell (1958), trumpeter Miles Davis (1959), saxophonist Johnny Griffin (1959), singer Dinah Washington (1959), and pianist Andrew Hill (1959); the latter of whom he had gone to school with as a boy in Chicago.

In 1960 Gilmore moved from Chicago to New York City with the other members of Arkestra. In the early 1960s he worked frequently as a sideman in gigs in New York with artists like trumpeter Freddie Hubbard (1962), singer and guitarist B.B. King (1963-1964), pianist Paul Bley (1964), Andrew Hill (1964), and drummer Art Blakey (1964). From 1964 through 1966 he toured with the Blakey's Jazz Messengers; replacing saxophonist Wayne Shorter in the ensemble. After this he performed with a variety of artists, including double bassist and pianist Charles Mingus (1966), pianists McCoy Tyner (1967) and George Russell (1968); drummer Art Taylor (1968); and trombonist Melba Liston (1969). During this time he also participated in recording sessions with Bley, Hill (Andrew!!! and Compulsion), Pete La Roca (Turkish Women at the Bath), McCoy Tyner (Today and Tomorrow) and a handful of others. In 1970, he co-led a recording with Jamaican trumpeter Dizzy Reece. His main focus throughout, however, remained with the Sun Ra Arkestra.

== Devotion to Sun Ra and his band ==
Gilmore's devotion to Sun Ra was due, in part, to the latter's use of harmony, which Gilmore considered both unique and a logical extension of bebop. Gilmore had stated that Sun Ra was "more stretched out than Monk" and that "I'm not gonna run across anybody who's moving as fast as Sun Ra ... So I just stay where I am."

Gilmore occasionally doubled on drums and also played bass clarinet until Sun Ra hired Robert Cummings as a specialist on the latter instrument in the mid-1950s. However, tenor sax was his main instrument and Gilmore himself made a huge contribution to Sun Ra's recordings and was the Arkestra's leading sideman, being given solos on almost every track on which he appeared. In the Rough Guide to Jazz, Brian Priestley says:

Gilmore is known for two rather different styles of tenor playing. On performances of a straight ahead post-bop character (which include many of those with Sun Ra), he runs the changes with a fluency and tone halfway between Johnny Griffin and Wardell Gray, and with a rhythmic and motivic approach which he claims influenced Coltrane. On more abstract material, he is capable of long passages based exclusively on high-register squeals. Especially when heard live, Gilmore was one of the few musicians who carried sufficient conviction to encompass both approaches.

In the early 1970s, Gilmore moved to Philadelphia with Sun Ra and the other members of Arkestra. After Sun Ra died in 1993, Gilmore led Ra's Arkestra for a few years before his own death from emphysema. Marshall Allen then took over leading the Arkestra.

== Discography ==
=== As co-leader ===
- Blowing in from Chicago (Blue Note, 1957) co-leader with Cliff Jordan

=== As sideman ===
With Sun Ra

- Refer to the Sun Ra discography

With Paul Bley

- Turning Point (Improvising Artists, 1975 rec. 1964)

With Freddie Hubbard

- The Artistry of Freddie Hubbard (Impulse!, 1962)

With McCoy Tyner

- Today and Tomorrow (Impulse!, 1963)

With Elmo Hope

- Sounds from Rikers Island (Audio Fidelity, 1963)

With Andrew Hill

- Andrew!!! (Blue Note, 1964)
- Compulsion! (Blue Note, 1966)

With Art Blakey

- 'S Make It (Limelight, 1965)

With Pete La Roca

- Turkish Women at the Bath (Douglas, 1967) also released as Bliss!

With Phil Upchurch

- Feeling Blue (Milestone, 1967)

With Dizzy Reece

- From In to Out (Futura, 1970)
