= SOLOS: The Jazz Sessions =

- Country of origin: Canada
- No. of seasons: 3
- No. of episodes: 39

Production
- Production company: Original Spin Media

Original release
- Network: Bravo!
- Release: 2004

SOLOS: the jazz sessions is a 39-part television music profile/performance series produced in Canada by Original Spin Media. Each episode features complete musical pieces, interviews and behind-the-scenes footage with some of today's most notable jazz artists. Shot in HDTV with multiple moving cameras and a medley of elegant, cinematic lighting designs, SOLOS: the jazz sessions showcases an exciting and dynamic variety of jazz styles – from the blues and boogie-woogie to bebop and beyond. The series premiered on Bravo! in Canada in the summer of 2004 and has subsequently been broadcast on HDNet, CBC Bold, Rave HD, Sky Arts, VTR Chile, and Mezzo TV. The programs are filmed at Toronto's Berkeley Church performance and event venue.

== Season 1 ==
- Bill Frisell
- Joe Lovano
- Brad Mehldau
- Charlie Hunter
- Andrew Hill
- Jacky Terrasson
- Kevin Breit
- Phil Dwyer
- Michael Kaeshammer
- James Blood Ulmer
- Mike Murley
- Paul Plimley
- Cyro Baptista

== Season 2 ==
- Greg Osby
- Andy Statman
- Lee Konitz
- John Abercrombie
- Gonzalo Rubalcaba
- Kurt Rosenwinkel
- Mark Turner
- Steven Bernstein
- Don Thompson
- Roscoe Mitchell
- Erik Friedlander
- Ethan Iverson
- Reid Anderson

== Season 3 ==
- Dave Young
- Marilyn Lerner
- Lorraine Desmarais
- Jean Beaudet
- Kelly Joe Phelps
- Jon Ballantyne
- David Braid
- Quinsin Nachoff
- Matt Wilson
- Matthew Shipp
- Matt Wilson & Lee Konitz
- Greg Osby & John Abercrombie
