= Andrew Hill (pianist) =

American jazz pianist and composer (1931–2007)

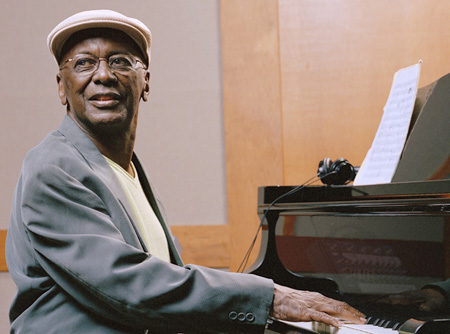

Background information
- Born: June 30, 1931; Chicago, Illinois, United States
- Died: April 20, 2007 (aged 75) Jersey City, New Jersey, United States
- Genres: Jazz, avant-garde jazz, post bop, hard bop
- Occupations: Musician, bandleader, composer
- Instruments: Piano, celeste, harpsichord
- Years active: 1954–2007
- Labels: Blue Note, SteepleChase, Soul Note, Palmetto
- Website: andrewhilljazz.com

Andrew Hill (June 30, 1931 – April 20, 2007) was an American jazz pianist and composer.

Jazz critic John Fordham described Hill as a "uniquely gifted composer, pianist and educator" although "his status remained largely inside knowledge in the jazz world for most of his career."

Hill recorded for Blue Note Records for nearly a decade, producing a dozen albums.

== Biography ==
=== Early life ===
Hill was born in Chicago, Illinois, to William and Hattie Hill. (Note: In the early 1960s, to promote himself by seeming to be more exotic, Hill told people that he had been born in Port-au-Prince, Haiti.) He had a brother, Robert, who was a singer and classical violin player. Hill took up the piano at the age of thirteen, and was encouraged by Earl Hines. As a child, he attended the University of Chicago Experimental School. He was referred by jazz composer Bill Russo to Paul Hindemith, with whom he studied informally until 1952.

While a teenager, he performed in rhythm and blues bands and with touring jazz musicians, including Charlie Parker and Miles Davis. Hill recalls some of his experience as a youngster, during a 1964 interview with Leonard Feather: "I started out in music as a boy soprano, singing and playing the accordion, and tap dancing. I had a little act and made quite a few of the talent shows around town from 1943 until 1947. I won turkeys at two Thanksgiving parties at the Regal Theatre," parties sponsored by the newspaper Chicago Defender, which Hill coincidentally used to sell on the streets.

=== Career ===
In 1950, Hill learned his first blues changes on the piano from the saxophonist Pat Patrick and in 1953, he played his first professional job as a musician, with Paul Williams' band. "At that time", he recalls, "I was playing baritone sax as well as piano." During the next few years, the piano gigs brought him into contact with many musicians, some of whom became relevant influences: Joe Segal and Barry Harris, among others. In 1961, after travelling as an accompanist for Dinah Washington, the young pianist settled in New York City in 1961, where he worked for Johnny Hartman and Al Hibbler, then briefly moved to Los Angeles County, where he worked with Roland Kirk's quartet and at the jazz club Lighthouse Café, in Hermosa Beach.

Hill first recorded as a sideman in 1954, but his reputation was made by his Blue Note recordings as leader from 1963 to 1970, which featured several other important post-bop musicians including Joe Chambers, Richard Davis, Eric Dolphy, Bobby Hutcherson, Joe Henderson, Freddie Hubbard, Elvin Jones, Woody Shaw, Tony Williams, and John Gilmore. Hill also played on albums by Henderson, Hutcherson, and Hank Mobley. His compositions accounted for three of the five pieces on Bobby Hutcherson's Dialogue album.

Hill rarely worked as a sideman after the 1960s, preferring to play his own compositions. This may have limited his public exposure. He later taught in California and held a tenure-track faculty appointment at Portland State University from 1989 to 1996. While at PSU, he established a Summer Jazz Intensive program, in addition to performing, conducting workshops and attending residencies at Wesleyan University, the University of Michigan, the University of Toronto, Harvard University, Bennington College and other schools.

Hill's album Dusk was selected best album of 2001 by both DownBeat and JazzTimes; and in 2003, Hill received the Jazzpar Prize. Hill's earlier work also received renewed attention as a result of the belated release of several unissued sessions recorded in the 1960s for Blue Note, notably the ambitious large-group date Passing Ships. In 2004, he appeared on SOLOS: The Jazz Sessions. As a consequence of his renewed prominence, a new Blue Note album titled Time Lines was released on February 21, 2006.

His final public performance was on March 29, 2007, at Trinity Church in New York City.

== Private life ==
It was while working at the Lighthouse Café, in Hermosa Beach that he met his future wife, Laverne Gillette, at the time an organist at the Red Carpet. They married in 1963 and moved to New York.

Laverne died following a long illness in California, where the couple had settled, in 1989. He married dancer/educator Joanne Robinson Hill in Portland in 1992. They moved to New York City in 1995. From 2000, Hill and his wife lived in Jersey City, New Jersey.

Andrew Hill suffered from lung cancer during the last years of his life. He died at his home in Jersey City, New Jersey.

In May 2007, he became the first person to receive a posthumous honorary doctorate from Berklee College of Music.

== Playing style ==
Hill's main influences were pianists Thelonious Monk, Bud Powell and Art Tatum. "Monk's like Ravel and Debussy to me, in that he put a lot of personality into his playing [...] it's the personality of music which makes it, finally," he said in a 1963 interview with A. B. Spellman. Powell was an even greater influence, but Hill thought that his music was a dead end: "If you stay with Bud too much, you'll always sound like him, even if you're doing something he never did." Hill referred to Tatum as the epitome of "all modern piano playing".

== Discography ==
=== As leader ===
Recording date	Title	Label	Year released	Notes
1959	So in Love	Warwick	1960	Trio, with Malachi Favors (bass), James Slaughter (drums)
1963-11	Black Fire	Blue Note	1964	Quartet, with Joe Henderson (tenor sax), Richard Davis (bass), Roy Haynes (drums)
1963-12	Smoke Stack	Blue Note	1966	Trio, with Richard Davis/Eddie Khan (bass), Roy Haynes (drums)
1964-01	Judgment!	Blue Note	1964	Quartet, with Bobby Hutcherson (vibes), Richard Davis (bass), Elvin Jones (drums)
1964-03	Point of Departure	Blue Note	1965	Sextet, with Eric Dolphy (flute, bass clarinet, alto sax), Joe Henderson (tenor sax), Kenny Dorham (trumpet), Richard Davis (bass), Tony Williams (drums)
1964-06	Andrew!!!	Blue Note	1968	Quintet, with John Gilmore (tenor sax), Bobby Hutcherson (vibes), Richard Davis (bass), Joe Chambers (drums)
1965-02	Pax	Blue Note	2006	Quintet, with Joe Henderson (tenor sax), Freddie Hubbard (cornet), Richard Davis (bass), Joe Chambers (drums)
1965-10	Compulsion!!!!!	Blue Note	1967	With John Gilmore (bass clarinet, tenor sax), Freddie Hubbard (trumpet, flugelhorn), Richard Davis (bass), Joe Chambers (drums), Nadi Qamar (conga, percussion), Renaud Simmons (conga)
1966-03	Change	Blue Note	2007	Quartet, with Sam Rivers (tenor sax), Walter Booker (bass), J. C. Moses (drums); first issued as Sam Rivers's album Involution
1968-04, 1968-08	Grass Roots	Blue Note	1968	Some tracks quintet with Frank Mitchell (tenor sax), Woody Shaw (trumpet), Reggie Workman (bass), Idris Muhammad (drums); some tracks sextet, with Jimmy Ponder (guitar) added; some tracks quintet with Booker Ervin (tenor sax), Lee Morgan (trumpet), Ron Carter (bass), Freddie Waits (drums)
1968-10	Dance with Death	Blue Note	1980	LT series. Quintet, with Joe Farrell (soprano sax, tenor sax), Charles Tolliver (trumpet), Victor Sproles (bass), Billy Higgins (drums)
1969-05, 1970-03	Lift Every Voice	Blue Note	1970	With Carlos Garnett (tenor sax), Woody Shaw (trumpet), Richard Davis (bass), Freddie Waits (drums), Benjamin Franklin Carter, Joan Johnson, LaReine LaMar, Gail Nelson, Antenett Goodman Ray, Ron Steward and Lawrence Marshall (vocals)
1969-11	Passing Ships	Blue Note	2003	With Dizzy Reece and Woody Shaw (trumpet), Joe Farrell (alto flute, English horn, bass clarinet, soprano sax, tenor sax), Howard Johnson (bass clarinet, tuba), Robert Northern (French horn), Julian Priester (trombone), Ron Carter (bass), Lenny White (drums)
1974-10	Invitation	SteepleChase	1975	Trio, with Chris White (bass), Art Lewis (drums)
1974-12 – 1975-01	Spiral	Freedom	1975	Some tracks quartet, with Robin Kenyatta (alto sax), Stafford James (bass), Barry Altschul (drums); some tracks quintet, with Lee Konitz (soprano sax, alto sax, tenor sax), Ted Curson (trumpet, fleugelhorn, pocket trumpet), Cecil McBee (bass), Art Lewis (drums)
1975-02	Blue Black	East Wind	1975	Quartet, with Jimmy Vass (flute, soprano sax, alto sax), Chris White (bass), Leroy Williams (drums)
1975-07	Divine Revelation	SteepleChase	1975	One track solo piano; some tracks quartet, with Jimmy Vass (flute, soprano sax, alto sax), Chris White (bass), Leroy Williams (drums)
1975-07	Live at Montreux	Freedom	1975	Solo piano; in concert
1975-05, 1975-07	Hommage	East Wind	1975	Solo piano
1976-01	Nefertiti	East Wind	1976	Trio, with Richard Davis (bass), Roger Blank (drums)
1978-10	From California with Love	Artists House	1979	Solo piano
1980-06	Strange Serenade	Soul Note	1980	Trio, with Alan Silva (bass), Freddie Waits (drums)
1980-06	Faces of Hope	Soul Note	1980	Solo piano
1986-07	Shades	Soul Note	1987	Some tracks trio, with Rufus Reid (bass), Ben Riley (drums); some tracks quartet, with Clifford Jordan (tenor sax)
1986-07	Verona Rag	Soul Note	1987	Solo piano
1989-01	Eternal Spirit	Blue Note	1989	Quintet, with Greg Osby (alto sax), Bobby Hutcherson (vibes), Rufus Reid (bass), Ben Riley (drums)
1990-07, 1990-09	But Not Farewell	Blue Note	1991	Two tracks solo piano; one track duo, with Greg Osby (alto sax); most tracks quintet, with Osby (alto sax, soprano sax), Robin Eubanks (trombone), Lonnie Plaxico (bass), Cecil Brooks III (drums)
1993-03	Dreams Come True	Joyous Shout!	2008	Duo, with Chico Hamilton (drums, percussion)
1998-02	Les Trinitaires	Jazzfriends	1988	Solo piano; in concert
1999-09 – 1999-10	Dusk	Palmetto	2000	Two tracks solo piano; most tracks sextet, with Marty Ehrlich (bass clarinet, alto sax), Greg Tardy (bass clarinet, tenor sax), Ron Horton (trumpet), Scott Colley (bass), Billy Drummond (drums)
2002-01	A Beautiful Day	Palmetto	2002	With big band; in concert
2003-04	The Day the World Stood Still	Stunt	2003	With Thomas Agergaard (flute, tenor sax), Peter Fuglsang (clarinet, bass clarinet, alto sax), Liudas Mockunas (clarinet, bass clarinet, soprano sax, baritone sax), Staffan Svensson (trumpet), Klaus Löhrer (bass trombone, tuba), Scott Colley (bass), Nasheet Waits (drums), Lenora Zenzalai Helm (vocals); in concert
2005-06 – 2005-07	Time Lines	Blue Note	2006	One track solo piano; most tracks quintet, with Greg Tardy (clarinet, bass clarinet, tenor sax), Charles Tolliver (trumpet), John Hebert (bass), Eric McPherson (drums)

Compilations

- One for One (Blue Note, 1975)[2LP]
- The Complete Blue Note Andrew Hill Sessions (1963-66) (Mosaic, 1995)[7CD/10LP]
- Mosaic Select 16: Andrew Hill (Mosaic, 2005)[3CD]
- Mosaic Select 23: Andrew Hill-Solo (Mosaic, 2007)[3CD]

=== As sideman ===
- 1962: Roland Kirk, Domino (Mercury, 1962)
- 1962: Walt Dickerson, To My Queen (New Jazz, 1963)
- 1963: Jimmy Woods, Conflict (Contemporary, 1963)
- 1963: Joe Henderson, Our Thing (Blue Note, 1964)
- 1963: Hank Mobley, No Room for Squares (Blue Note, 1964)
- 1965: Bobby Hutcherson, Dialogue (Blue Note, 1965)
- 1992: Russel Baba, Earth Prayer (Ruda Music, 1994)
- 1993: Reggie Workman, Summit Conference (Postcards, 1994)
- 1999: Greg Osby, The Invisible Hand (Blue Note, 2000)
