= Compulsion (album) =

Compulsion!!!!!

Studio album by Andrew Hill
- Released: End of February 1967
- Recorded: October 8, 1965
- Studio: Van Gelder Studio, Englewood Cliffs, NJ
- Genre: Free jazz
- Length: 41:04
- Label: Blue Note; BST 84217
- Producer: Alfred Lion

Andrew Hill chronology
Pax (1965)	Compulsion!!!!! (1967)	Change (1966)

Professional ratings
Review scores
Source	Rating
Allmusic	4/5 stars
DownBeat	3.5/5 stars
The Penguin Guide to Jazz Recordings	3/4 stars

Compulsion!!!!! is a studio album by American jazz pianist Andrew Hill. It was originally released in 1967 under the Blue Note Label as BST 84217. In its album review, Billboard wrote of Compulsion!!!!!, "The wild, yet disciplined piano of Andre [sic] Hill is the driving force behind this strange and moving record." It was remastered by Rudy Van Gelder in 2006. Featured musicians include trumpeter Freddie Hubbard, tenor saxophonist John Gilmore, bassist Cecil McBee and drummer Joe Chambers.

== Background and album concept ==
Hill's intention was to "...construct an album expressing the legacy of the Negro tradition," and to use the piano more as a percussive instrument than a melodic one. The second number, "Legacy", was dedicated to the Afro-American legacy, and is followed by "Premonition", which Hill described as "indicating not alone a look ahead, but rather a sufficiently revealing look backward, so that you can really begin to know what may come." The album concludes with "Limbo", a 20-bar tune, a piece written to represent the state in which Hill considered the majority of Afro-Americans to be in at the time, not drawing on their heritage.

== Track listing ==
All compositions by Andrew Hill

1. "Compulsion" – 14:15
2. "Legacy" – 5:50
3. "Premonition" – 10:32
4. "Limbo" – 10:17

== Personnel ==
- Andrew Hill – piano
- Freddie Hubbard – trumpet, flugelhorn (Except track 2)
- John Gilmore – tenor saxophone, bass clarinet (Except track 2)
- Cecil McBee – bass
- Joe Chambers – drums
- Renaud Simmons – conga, percussion
- Nadi Qamar – percussion, African drums, thumb piano
- Richard Davis – bass (track 3)

== Sources ==
- Compulsion page at Blue Note website
