= Breaking Point! =

Studio album by Freddie Hubbard
- Released: August 1964
- Recorded: May 7, 1964
- Studios: Van Gelder, Englewood Cliffs, NJ
- Genre: Jazz
- Length: 40:12
- Labels: Blue Note; BST 84172
- Producer: Alfred Lion

Freddie Hubbard chronology
Doin' the Thang! (1963)	Breaking Point! (1964)	Blue Spirits (1965)

Breaking Point! is an album by trumpeter Freddie Hubbard, recorded on May 7, 1964, and released on the Blue Note label. This album features Joe Chambers' recording debut. Although it features performances by Hubbard's recent collaborators Ronnie Mathews and Eddie Khan, it was a departure in style from his work with Mathews and the Jazz Messengers.

== Reception ==
Professional ratings
Review scores
Source	Rating
AllMusic	4.5/5 stars
The Penguin Guide to Jazz Recordings	3.5/4 stars
The Rolling Stone Jazz Record Guide	5/5 stars

Michael G. Nastos of AllMusic commented "The pure energy Hubbard injected into this ensemble, and the sheer originality of this music beyond peers like Miles Davis and Lee Morgan, identified Hubbard as the newest of new voices on his instrument. Breaking Point has stood the test of time as a recording far ahead of mid-'60s post-bop, and is an essential item for all listeners of incendiary progressive jazz". Chris Slawecki in his review for Encyclopedia of Music in the 20th Century called the album "a crackling mixture of free atonality, beautiful melody and blues feeling."

== Track listing ==
All compositions by Freddie Hubbard except as noted

1. "Breaking Point" - 10:19
2. "Far Away" - 10:58
3. "Blue Frenzy" - 6:23
4. "D Minor Mint" - 6:24
5. "Mirrors" (Chambers) - 6:08
6. "Blue Frenzy" [Alternate take] - 3:18 Bonus track on CD
7. "Mirrors" [Alternate take] - 3:23 Bonus track on CD

== Personnel ==
- Freddie Hubbard - trumpet
- James Spaulding - alto saxophone, flute
- Ronnie Mathews - piano
- Eddie Khan - bass
- Joe Chambers - drums

== Charts ==
2022 chart performance for Breaking Point!
Chart (2022)	Peak position
German Albums (Offizielle Top 100)	41
Swiss Albums (Schweizer Hitparade)	67
UK Jazz & Blues Albums (Official Charts)	1
UK Physical Albums (Official Charts)	82
UK Vinyl Albums (Official Charts)	32
US Top Album Sales (Billboard)	65
US Top Jazz Albums (Billboard)	4
