= Smoke Stack (album) =

Studio album by Andrew Hill
- Released: Early August 1966
- Recorded: December 13, 1963
- Studio: Van Gelder Studio, Englewood Cliffs, NJ
- Genre: Post bop Avant-garde jazz
- Length: 39:40 (LP); 60:45 (CD)
- Label: Blue Note Records; BST 84160
- Producer: Alfred Lion

Andrew Hill chronology
Black Fire (1963)	Smoke Stack (1966)	Judgment! (1964)

Professional ratings
Review scores
Source	Rating
Allmusic	3/5 stars
DownBeat	3/5 stars
The Penguin Guide to Jazz Recordings	3/4 stars

Smoke Stack is a studio album by American jazz pianist Andrew Hill, recorded in 1963 and released in 1966 on Blue Note Records. It was his second recording as leader on the label. "Ode to Von" is dedicated to saxophonist Von Freeman, whilst "Verne" is dedicated to Hill's first wife, Laverne Gillette. 30 Pier Ave. is the address of The Lighthouse, a jazz club in Hermosa Beach, CA. The album is notable for the participation of acoustic bassists Richard Davis and Eddie Khan, who play simultaneously throughout. Drummer Roy Haynes returns from Hill’s previous sessions.

== Track listing ==
All compositions by Andrew Hill

1. "Smoke Stack" – 5:00
2. "The Day After" – 5:07
3. "Wailing Wall" – 5:46
4. "Ode to Von" – 4:29
5. "Not So" – 6:24
6. "Verne" – 5:48
7. "30 Pier Avenue" – 7:06

Bonus tracks on CD:

8. "Smoke Stack" [Alternate take] - 4:20
9. "The Day After" [Alternate take] - 4:49
10. "Ode to Von" [Alternate take] - 5:28
11. "Not So" [Alternate take] - 6:28

== Personnel ==
- Andrew Hill – piano
- Richard Davis – bass
- Eddie Khan – bass
- Roy Haynes – drums
