= Blowing In from Chicago =

Studio album by Clifford Jordan & John Gilmore
- Released: July 1957
- Recorded: March 3, 1957
- Studio: Van Gelder Studio; Hackensack, New Jersey
- Genre: Hard bop
- Length: 46:15
- Label: Blue Note; BLP 1549
- Producer: Alfred Lion

Clifford Jordan chronology
Blowing In from Chicago (1957)	Cliff Jordan (1957)

Blowing In from Chicago is a studio album by the American jazz saxophonists Clifford Jordan and John Gilmore. It was released through Blue Note Records in July 1957. The recording was made on March 3, 1957 and the quintet assembled for the session features rhythm section Horace Silver, Curly Russell and Art Blakey.

== Release history ==
The CD reissue in 1994 added a bonus track from the same session.

== Reception ==
Professional ratings
Review scores
Source	Rating
All About Jazz	4/5 stars
AllMusic	5/5 stars
MusicHound Jazz	5/5 stars
The Penguin Guide to Jazz Recordings	3/4 stars
The Rolling Stone Jazz Record Guide	4/5 stars

The AllMusic review by Scott Yanow states, "Clifford Jordan's first date as a leader actually found him sharing a heated jam session with fellow tenor John Gilmore. ... This was one of Gilmore's few sessions outside of Sun Ra. This session finds both young tenor men in fine form. Recommended."

The Penguin Jazz Guide suggests that the album may be “the neglected masterpiece of Blue Note hard bop”, noting that Gilmore plays in a style distinct from the freer approach he used with Sun Ra, and that Jordan solos powerfully but with “real thought and logic”.

The editors of MusicHound Jazz awarded the album a full five stars, calling it "a stunner" and "a fine hard-bop date for all involved," and noting that Gilmore "locks horns brilliantly with Jordan's beefy style, without turning it into an out-and-out blowing session brawl."

A reviewer for Billboard stated that Jordan and Gilmore "play with 'hard' sound and sharply rhythmic attack to good results," and commented: "Valuable solo content and general vitality of this blowing session should please jazz buyers."

Marc Davis of All About Jazz described the album as "a lively, wonderful record firmly in the Blue Note bop tradition," and remarked: "for this one moment, Jordan and Gilmore are every bit the equal of any past or future Jazz Messengers. It's an enjoyable record, well worth picking up."

== Track listing ==
Side 1
No.	Title	Writer(s)	Length
1.	"Status Quo"	John Neely	5:36
2.	"Bo-Till"	Cliff Jordan	5:56
3.	"Blue Lights"	Gigi Gryce	6:38

Side 2
No.	Title	Writer(s)	Length
1.	"Billie's Bounce"	Charlie Parker	9:34
2.	"Evil Eye"	Jordan	5:14
3.	"Everywhere"	Horace Silver	5:45

Bonus track on CD reissue bonus track
No.	Title	Writer(s)	Length
7.	"Let it Stand"	Jordan; Gilmore	7:44

== Personnel ==
=== Musicians ===
- Clifford Jordan, John Gilmore – tenor saxophone
- Horace Silver – piano
- Curly Russell – bass
- Art Blakey – drums

=== Technical personnel ===
- Alfred Lion – producer
- Rudy Van Gelder – recording engineer, mastering engineer
- Harold Feinstein – design
- Francis Wolff – photography
- Joe Segal – liner notes
