= The Illinois Concert =

Live album by Eric Dolphy
- Released: 1999
- Recorded: March 10, 1963
- Genre: Jazz, post bop, avant-garde jazz
- Length: 69:03
- Label: Blue Note

The Illinois Concert is a live jazz recording of a concert by Eric Dolphy, released in 1999 by Blue Note Records. The album was recorded on March 10, 1963, at the University of Illinois in Champaign, Illinois and features Dolphy with pianist Herbie Hancock, bassist Eddie Khan, and drummer J.C. Moses. (Hancock would go on to join Miles Davis' Quintet roughly two months later.) The quartet is joined by the University of Illinois Brass Ensemble for one track, and by the University of Illinois Big Band for the final track. The tape of the concert, which was recorded for radio broadcast, did not surface until 1999, when it was mentioned in a chat room and was eventually brought to the attention of Michael Cuscuna.

Dolphy's Illinois trip was probably rushed, given that he recorded with Freddie Hubbard in New York on March 8 and 11.

== Reception ==
Professional ratings
Review scores
Source	Rating
AllMusic	4.5/5 stars
The Penguin Guide to Jazz Recordings	3.5/4 stars

In a review for AllMusic, Ken Dryden called the album "one of the finds of the decade" and wrote that "Dolphy's playing is consistently rewarding". He awarded the album 4.5 stars and praised it as "Highly recommended!" Writing for Exclaim!, David Dacks stated that the album is "a must for passionate Eric Dolphy fans" and noted that the music performed with the University of Illinois players "represents one of the very few times Dolphy arranged and recorded for a large ensemble under his leadership." He concluded: "This is not the best Dolphy record available, but even casual fans will love the especially high calibre of Dolphy's playing."

The authors of the Penguin Guide to Jazz Recordings wrote: "this belated release is a key step in building a more complete picture of Dolphy's foreshortened development."

John Sharpe, writing for All About Jazz, declared that the album "represents a major addition to the Dolphy discography", and thanked Blue Note for "unearthing this long-buried treasure!" Doug Ramsey wrote that Dolphy's playing is "strong medicine for many listeners in a time when homogenization, rather than individuality, wins the prize" and praised the bass clarinet introduction to "Softly as in a Morning Sunrise", stating that it "puts into a neat and irresistible package instrumental mastery, rhythmic urgency, audacious interval leaps, tonal refraction, humor and a speech-inflected delivery emblematic of the individuality that is the one attribute shared by the best jazz musicians."

== Track listing ==
1. "Softly, as in a Morning Sunrise" (O. Hammerstein, S. Romberg) – 20:17
2. "Something Sweet, Something Tender" (Dolphy) – 1:28
3. "God Bless The Child" (B. Holiday, A. Herzog Jr.) – 8:45
4. "South Street Exit" (Dolphy) – 7:30
5. "Iron Man" (Dolphy) – 10:57
6. "Red Planet" (Dolphy) – 12:26
7. "G.W." (Dolphy) – 7:40

== Personnel ==
- Eric Dolphy – flute, bass clarinet, alto saxophone
- Eddie Khan – bass
- Herbie Hancock – piano
- J.C. Moses – drums
- University of Illinois Brass Ensemble on "Red Planet"
- University of Illinois Big Band on "G.W."
