= Spiral (Andrew Hill album) =

Studio album by Andrew Hill
- Released: 1975
- Recorded: December 20, 1974 and January 20, 1975
- Genre: Jazz
- Length: 43:45
- Label: Freedom

Andrew Hill chronology
Invitation (1974)	Spiral (1975)	Blue Black (1975)

Spiral is an album by American jazz pianist Andrew Hill, recorded in late 1974 and early 1975 and released on the Freedom label. The album features six of Hill's original compositions and one interpretation of a jazz standard performed by a quartet and quintet. Featured players include saxophonist Lee Konitz and trumpeter Ted Curson. The cover incorrectly identifies the album as being recorded at the Montreux Jazz Festival when it actually contains studio recordings.

== Reception ==
Professional ratings
Review scores
Source	Rating
Allmusic	4/5 stars

The Allmusic review by Scott Yanow awarded the album 4 stars and stated "Although the music overall does not reach the heights of the pianist's earlier work for Blue Note (or his later sessions), there are enough surprising moments and thought-provoking solos to make this a release worth picking up by open-eared listeners".

== Track listing ==
All compositions by Andrew Hill except as indicated

1. "Tomorrow" – 3:30
2. "Laverne" – 6:00
3. "The Message" – 6:00
4. "Invitation" (Bronisław Kaper) – 7:18
5. "Today" – 4:42
6. "Spiral" – 9:00
7. "Quiet Dawn" – 7:15

- Recorded at C.I. Recording Studio, New York City on December 20, 1974 (tracks 2–4, 6) and January 20, 1975 (tracks 1, 5, 7)

== Personnel ==
- Andrew Hill – piano
- Ted Curson – trumpet, flugelhorn, pocket trumpet (tracks 2–3, 6)
- Lee Konitz – soprano saxophone, alto saxophone, tenor saxophone (tracks 2–4, 6)
- Robin Kenyatta – alto saxophone (tracks 5, 7)
- Cecil McBee (tracks 2–3, 6), Stafford James (tracks 1, 5, 7) – bass
- Barry Altschul (tracks 1, 5, 7), Art Lewis (tracks 2–3, 6) – drums
