= Headin' Home (Jimmy Owens album) =

Studio album by Jimmy Owens
- Released: 1978
- Recorded: 1978
- Studio: Audio One Recording Studios, New York City
- Genre: Jazz
- Length: 40:55
- Label: A&M/Horizon; SP-712
- Producer: Coleridge-Taylor Perkinson

Jimmy Owens chronology
Jimmy Owens (1976)	Headin' Home (1978)	Peaceful Walking (2007)

Headin' Home is an album by trumpeter Jimmy Owens recorded and released by the A&M/Horizon label in 1978.

== Reception ==
Professional ratings
Review scores
Source	Rating
Allmusic	2.5/5 stars

In his review on Allmusic, Richard S. Ginell notes "Headin' Home goes even further down the road of commercial viability than its predecessor on Horizon, as Owens tries once again to sell some records. Most of the tracks are up-tempo workouts unapologetically aimed for the dancefloor, with rather mellifluous trumpet or flügelhorn lines cresting the waves of wah-wah guitars and semi-funky drumming. Which is not a bad thing in itself, given decent, memorable material -- which this LP mostly lacks".

== Track listing ==
All compositions by Coleridge-Taylor Perkinson except where noted

1. "Home" (Charlie Smalls) − 5:53
2. "New Tune" − 5:47
3. "Dreaming My Life Away" (Jimmy Owens, Norma Jordan) − 5:45
4. "Never Subject to Change" (Owens) − 5:34
5. "B. S." − 6:51
6. "Sweet Love" (Kenny Barron, Chris White) − 9:42
7. "Exercise (Dis'go, Dis'way)" − 6:21

== Personnel ==
- Jimmy Owens – trumpet, flugelhorn
- Carlos Alomar (tracks 1–4 & 6), George Davis, Mantwila Nyomo (track 5) − guitar
- Kenny Barron (tracks 1–6), Stanley Cowell (track 7) − keyboards
- Chris White − bass (tracks 5 & 6)
- Gary King − electric bass (tracks 1–4 & 7)
- Brian Brake (tracks 1–6), Billy Cobham (track 7) – drums
- Erroll 'Crusher' Bennett − percussion (tracks 4–7)
- Cecil Bridgewater, Jon Faddis, Virgil Jones, Victor Paz, Charles Sullivan − trumpet (track 7)
- Wayne Andre, Earl McIntyre, Alfred Patterson, Janice Robinson − trombone (track 7)
- Jerry Dodgion, Alex Foster − alto saxophone, flute (track 7)
- Seldon Powell, Harold Vick − tenor saxophone, flute (track 7)
- George Barrow − baritone saxophone, flute (track 7)
- Coleridge-Taylor Perkinson − arranger (tracks 1, 2, 5 & 7)
