= Mosaic Select 16: Andrew Hill =

Compilation album by Andrew Hill
- Released: Early 2005
- Recorded: January 16, 1970 (CD1 #2–3, 5); January 23, 1970 (CD1 #1, 4, 6–7); June 13, 1969 (CD1 #8–9); August 1, 1969 (CD2 #1–5); May 17, 1967 (CD2 #6–12); October 31, 1967 (CD3 #1–5); February 10, 1967 (CD3 #6–10); Van Gelder Studio, Englewood Cliffs
- Genre: Jazz
- Length: 212:01
- Label: Mosaic; MS-016
- Producer: Francis Wolff (CD1; CD2 1–5; CD3 1–5); Alfred Lion (CD2 6–12; CD3 6–10)

Professional ratings
Review scores
Source	Rating
Allmusic	4.5/5 stars

Mosaic Select 16: Andrew Hill is a compilation album by American pianist Andrew Hill. Except for six tracks, issued on One for One in 1975, it features previously unreleased pieces originally recorded for Blue Note Records.

== Track listing ==
All compositions by Andrew Hill

CD 1

1. "Without Malice" – 4:52
2. "Ocho Rios" [First Version] – 10:29
3. "Diddy Wah" – 6:50
4. "Ode to Infinity" – 4:52
5. "The Dance" – 5:34
6. "Satin Lady" – 7:59
7. "Ocho Rios" [Second Version] – 7:33
8. "Monkash" – 6:30
9. "Mahogany" – 6:53

CD 2

1. "Illusion" – 7:00
2. "Poinsettia" – 6:24
3. "Fragments" – 5:03
4. "Soul Mate" – 6:21
5. "Illusion" [Alternate Take] – 6:30
6. "Interfusion" – 7:26
7. "Resolution" – 6:24
8. "Chained" – 5:40
9. "MOMA" – 5:35
10. "Nine at the Bottom" – 5:52
11. "Six at the Top" – 9:10
12. "Nine at the Bottom" [Alternate Take] – 6:15

CD 3

1. "For Blue People Only" – 9:37
2. "Enamorado" – 6:09
3. "Mother's Tale" – 9:30
4. "Oriba" [First Version] – 5:40
5. "Oriba" [Second Version] – 6:14
6. "Awake" – 7:08
7. "Now" – 4:43
8. "I" – 7:27
9. "Yomo" – 10:04
10. "Prevue" – 6:17

== Personnel ==
=== CD 1 ===
Tracks 2–3, 5

- Andrew Hill – piano
- Charles Tolliver – trumpet
- Pat Patrick – flute (2), alto clarinet (3), alto saxophone (2), baritone saxophone (5)
- Bennie Maupin – flute, tenor saxophone
- Ron Carter – bass
- Paul Motian – drums

Tracks 1, 4, 6–7

- Andrew Hill – piano
- Charles Tolliver – trumpet, flugelhorn
- Pat Patrick – flute (2), alto clarinet (3), alto saxophone (1–2)
- Bennie Maupin – flute, tenor saxophone, bass clarinet
- Ron Carter – bass
- Ben Riley – drums

Tracks 8–9

- Andrew Hill – piano
- Carlos Garnett – tenor saxophone
- Richard Davis – bass
- Freddie Waits – drums
- Sanford Allen – violin
- Selwart Clarke, Booker Rowe – viola
- Kermit Moore – cello

=== CD 2 ===
Tracks 1–5

- Andrew Hill – piano
- Bennie Maupin – tenor saxophone, flute
- Ron Carter – bass
- Mickey Roker – drums
- Sanford Allen – violin
- Selwart Clarke, Al Brown – viola
- Kermit Moore – cello

Tracks 6–12

- Andrew Hill – piano, soprano saxophone (11), organ (7, 10, 12)
- Ron Carter – bass
- Teddy Robinson – drums

=== CD 3 ===
Tracks 1–5

- Andrew Hill – piano
- Woody Shaw – trumpet
- Sam Rivers – soprano saxophone, tenor saxophone
- Howard Johnson – baritone saxophone, tuba
- Robin Kenyatta – alto saxophone
- Herbie Lewis – bass
- Teddy Robinson– drums

Tracks 6–10

- Andrew Hill – piano, organ (9, 10)
- Sam Rivers – soprano saxophone, tenor saxophone, flute
- Robin Kenyatta – alto saxophone
- Cecil McBee – bass
- Teddy Robinson – drums
- Nadi Qamar (Spaulding Givens) – thumb piano, African drum, bells
