= Jimmy Owens (album) =

Studio album by Jimmy Owens
- Released: 1976
- Recorded: May 4, 5, 6, 1976
- Studio: Audio I Recording Studios, New York City
- Genre: Jazz
- Length: 40:55
- Label: A&M/Horizon; SP-712
- Producer: Coleridge-Taylor Perkinson

Jimmy Owens chronology
| No Escaping It (1970) | Jimmy Owens (1976) | Headin' Home (1978) |

Jimmy Owens (also referred to as Young Man on the Move) is an album by trumpeter Jimmy Owens recorded and released by the A&M/Horizon label in 1976.

== Reception ==
Professional ratings
Review scores
| Source | Rating |
|---|---|
| Allmusic | 3/5 stars |

In his review on Allmusic, Richard S. Ginell notes "There was a time when Jimmy Owens was being positioned as the coming superstar of the jazz trumpet, signed to A&M's contemporary-thinking Horizon label as a leader and jumping into the thick of the jazz-funk scene ... Owens sails above the churning mix with a slender, lightish tone that nevertheless has a steel thread running through it. The combination works intermittently, alas".

== Track listing ==
All compositions by Jimmy Owens except where noted

1. "Caravan" (Duke Ellington, Juan Tizol, Irving Mills) − 10:02
2. "What's the Use" – 10:02
3. "Do It to It" − 6:21
4. "Secret Love" (Sammy Fain, Paul Francis Webster) − 8:20
5. "My Life" (Chris White) − 6:10

== Personnel ==
- Jimmy Owens – trumpet, flugelhorn
- Kenny Barron – piano, electric piano, clavinet, synthesizer
- Chris White − bass, electric bass
- Brian Brake – drums
- George Davis (tracks 1–3 & 5), Lloyd Davis (tracks 1 & 2), Carl Lynch (track 3) − guitar
- Warren Smith − percussion (tracks 1–3)
