= Shades (Andrew Hill album) =

Studio album by Andrew Hill
- Released: 1987
- Recorded: July 3–4, 1986
- Studio: Barigozzi Studio, Milan
- Genre: Jazz
- Length: 43:21
- Label: Soul Note
- Producer: Giovanni Bonandrini

Andrew Hill chronology
Faces of Hope (1980)	Shades (1987)	Verona Rag (1986)

Shades is an album by American jazz pianist Andrew Hill, recorded in 1986 and released on the Italian Soul Note label in 1988. The album features six of Hill's original compositions, four performed by a quartet and two by a trio.

== Reception ==
Professional ratings
Review scores
Source	Rating
AllMusic	4/5 stars
The Penguin Guide to Jazz Recordings	3.5/4 stars

The AllMusic review by Scott Yanow wrote: "Stimulating and unusual music that is difficult to classify as anything but 'modern jazz'".

== Track listing ==
All compositions by Andrew Hill

1. "Monk's Glimpse" - 4:36
2. "Tripping" (a.k.a. "Naked Spirit") - 6:31
3. "Chilly Mac" - 5:29
4. "Ball Square" - 5:34
5. "Domani" - 7:28
6. "La Verne" - 13:43

- Recorded at Barigozzi Studio, Milan, Italy on July 3 & 4, 1986

== Personnel ==
- Andrew Hill - piano
- Clifford Jordan - tenor saxophone (tracks 1, 3, 5–6)
- Rufus Reid - bass
- Ben Riley - drums
