= Dusk (Andrew Hill album) =

Studio album by Andrew Hill
- Released: May 16, 2000
- Recorded: September 15 & October 27, 1999; Maggie's Farm, Bucks County
- Genre: Jazz
- Length: 59:43
- Label: Palmetto; PM 2057
- Producer: Matt Balitsaris

Andrew Hill chronology
Les Trinitaires (1998)	Dusk (2000)	A Beautiful Day (2002)

Dusk is a studio album by American jazz pianist Andrew Hill recorded in 1999 and released on the Palmetto label.

== Reception ==
Professional ratings
Review scores
Source	Rating
Allmusic	4.5/5 stars
The Penguin Guide to Jazz Recordings	3/4 stars

The Allmusic review by David R. Adler awarded the album 4½ stars and stated "With Dusk, Andrew Hill makes it plain that his uncompromising musical vision is intact, undiluted, and perhaps more advanced than ever".

== Track listing ==
All compositions by Andrew Hill

1. "Dusk" – 12:05
2. "ML" – 4:10
3. "Ball Square" – 4:25
4. "Tough Love" – 7:19
5. "Sept" – 12:27
6. "T.C." – 7:54
7. "15/8" – 10:31
8. "Focus" – 0:52

Recorded on September 15 (tracks 1–3 & 5–7) and October 27 (tracks 4 & 8), 1999.

== Personnel ==
- Andrew Hill – piano
- Marty Ehrlich – bass clarinet (track 2), alto saxophone (tracks 1, 3 & 5–7)
- Greg Tardy – bass clarinet (track 2), tenor saxophone (tracks 1, 3 & 5–7)
- Ron Horton – trumpet (tracks 1–3 & 5–7)
- Scott Colley – bass (tracks 1–3 & 5–7)
- Billy Drummond – drums (tracks 1–3 & 5–7)
