= Lift Every Voice (Andrew Hill album) =

Studio album by Andrew Hill
- Released: June 1970
- Recorded: May 16, 1969; March 6 & 13, 1970
- Studio: Van Gelder Studio, Englewood Cliffs, NJ
- Genre: Jazz
- Length: 32:40 original LP; 70:15 CD reissue
- Label: Blue Note; BST 84330
- Producer: Francis Wolff

Andrew Hill chronology
Dance With Death (1968)	Lift Every Voice (1970)	Passing Ships (1969)

Lift Every Voice is a studio album by American jazz pianist Andrew Hill featuring performances recorded in 1969 and released on the Blue Note label in 1970. The original album features Hill with a large choir performing five original compositions and the 2001 CD reissue added six additional compositions recorded in 1970 as bonus tracks.

== Reception ==
Professional ratings
Review scores
Source	Rating
Allmusic	4/5 stars
DownBeat	3/5 stars
The Penguin Guide to Jazz Recordings	4/4 stars

The Allmusic review by Richard S. Ginell awarded the album 4 stars calling it a "remarkably advanced fusion of voices and jazz quintet". A contemporary review in DownBeat awarded the album three stars, panning the choral arrangements which, they wrote, "intrude annoyingly on music that otherwise might have made this a very fine jazz album".

== Track listing ==
All compositions by Andrew Hill

1. "Hey Hey" - 7:55
2. "Lift Every Voice" - 8:06
3. "Two Lullabies" - 5:44
4. "Love Chant" - 5:42
5. "Ghetto Lights" - 5:13

Bonus tracks on CD reissue:

6. "Blue Spark" - 5:57
7. "A Tender Tale" - 6:58
8. "Drew's Tune" - 6:22
9. "Mother Mercy" - 5:16
10. "Natural Spirit" - 7:25
11. "Such It Is" - 5:37

Recorded on May 16, 1969 (tracks 1–5), March 6, 1970 (tracks 6–8) and March 13, 1970 (tracks 9–11).

== Personnel ==
Original LP (1–5):

- Andrew Hill - piano
- Woody Shaw - trumpet
- Carlos Garnett - tenor saxophone
- Richard Davis - bass
- Freddie Waits - drums
- Joan Johnson, LaReine LaMar, Gail Nelson, Antenett Goodman Ray - vocals
- Lawrence Marshall - vocals, conductor

Bonus tracks, 1970 recording (6–11):

- Andrew Hill - piano
- Lee Morgan - trumpet
- Bennie Maupin - alto flute, bass clarinet, tenor saxophone
- Ron Carter - bass
- Ben Riley - drums
- Benjamin Franklin Carter, Milt Grayson, Hugh Harnell, Ron Steward, Lillian Williams - vocals
- Lawrence Marshall - vocals, conductor
