= Divine Revelation =

1975 jazz album by Andrew Hill

Studio album by Andrew Hill
- Released: 1975
- Recorded: July 10, 1975
- Genre: Jazz
- Length: 54:41
- Label: SteepleChase
- Producer: Nils Winther

Andrew Hill chronology
Hommage (1975)	Divine Revelation (1975)	Live at Montreux (1975)

Divine Revelation is an album by American jazz pianist Andrew Hill recorded in 1975 and released on the Danish SteepleChase label. The album features four of Hill's original compositions performed by a quartet and one jazz standard performed solo. The CD added one alternate take as a bonus track.

== Reception ==
Professional ratings
Review scores
Source	Rating
Allmusic	2.5/5 stars
The Penguin Guide to Jazz Recordings	3/4 stars

The Allmusic review by Scott Yanow awarded the album 2½ stars calling it "complex but logical music".

== Track listing ==
All compositions by Andrew Hill except as indicated

1. "Snake Hip Waltz" - 4:57
2. "Here's That Rainy Day" (Johnny Burke, Jimmy Van Heusen) - 3:39
3. "East 9th Street" - 6:25
4. "July 10th" - 7:53
5. "Divine Revelation" - 24:58
6. "July 10th" [alternate take] - 6:50 Bonus track on CD
  - Recorded at C.I. Recording Studio, New York City on July 10, 1975

== Personnel ==
- Andrew Hill - piano
- Jimmy Vass - flute (track 5), soprano saxophone (tracks 1 & 3), alto saxophone (tracks 4–6)
- Chris White - bass (tracks 1 & 3–6)
- Leroy Williams - drums (tracks 1 & 3–6)
