= Chris White (American bassist) =

American jazz bassist (1936–2014)

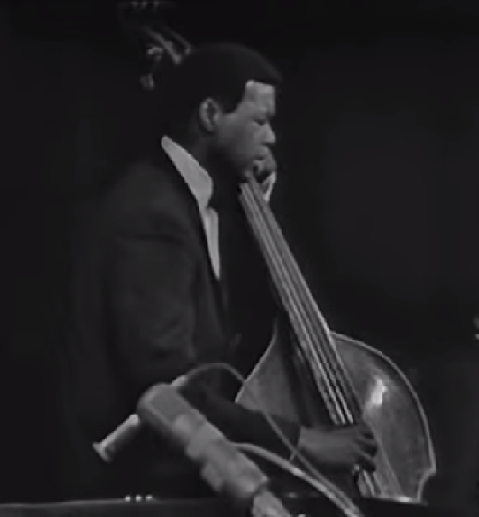

Background information
- Born: July 6, 1936; New York City, US
- Died: November 2, 2014 (aged 78)
- Occupations: Bass player, arranger, producer and teacher of music
- Instrument: Double bass
- Website: www.chriswhitebass.com

Chris White (July 6, 1936 − November 2, 2014) was an American jazz bassist.

== Early life and education ==
Christopher Wesley White was born in Harlem, New York, and grew up in Brooklyn. He graduated in 1956 from City College of New York, and in 1968 from the Manhattan School of Music. In 1974, he earned his Master of Education from the University of Massachusetts Amherst. In 1994, he did postgraduate Advanced Computer Study at Berklee College of Music.

== Career ==
White was an occasional member of Cecil Taylor's band in the 1950s, credited on the 1959 Love for Sale album. From 1960 to 1961 he accompanied Nina Simone; subsequently he was a member of Dizzy Gillespie's ensemble until 1966.

He later founded the band The Jazz Survivors and was a member of the band Prism. In addition to this, he collaborated with Billy Taylor, Eubie Blake, Earl Hines, Chick Corea, Teddy Wilson, Kenny Barron, Mary Lou Williams, Duke Ellington, Sarah Vaughan, Carmen McRae and Billy Cobham.

White served as executive director of the Institute of Jazz Studies at Rutgers University from 1972-1976, and served as chair of the Division of Creative Arts and Technology at Bloomfield College in New Jersey.

== Awards ==
- 1993-94 Bloomfield College, Award Of Acknowledgment
- 1990, 1984, 1982 National Endowment for the Arts, Inter-Arts Program, Jazz Composition
- 1990 New Jersey State Council On The Arts, Fellowship, Jazz
- 1979 Consortium Of Jazz Organizations And Artists, Outstanding Musicianship Award
- 1976 Professor Of The Year, Rutger's Newark Jazz Society
- 1968 Record World, New Star Best Jazz Bassist (Winner)
- 1963 Playboy Reader's Poll, Best Jazz Bassist (4th Place)
- 1961-64 Downbeat Reader's Poll, Best Bassist (3rd & 4th place)

== Discography ==
=== As leader ===
- The Chris White Project (Muse) with Cassandra Wilson (vocals); Marvin Horne, Jimmy Ponder (guitar); Grachan Moncur III (trombone); Michael Raye (synthesizer); Steve Nelson (vibraphone); Keith Copeland (drums); Steve Kroon (percussion)

Interface recorded 2010 Lou Caputo/Chris White co leaders with Warren Smith Vibs Payton Crosley Drums Don Stein piano Leopoldo Fleming percussion

=== As sideman ===
With Kenny Barron

- You Had Better Listen (Atlantic, 1967) with Jimmy Owens
- Lucifer (Muse, 1975)

With Nina Simone

- Nina Simone at Newport (Colpix, 1960)

With Dizzy Gillespie

- The New Continent (Limelight, 1962)
- Dizzy Gillespie and the Double Six of Paris (Philips, 1963)
- Jambo Caribe (Limelight, 1964)
- I/We Had a Ball (Limelight, 1965) - 1 track

With Ramsey Lewis

- Barefoot Sunday Blues (Argo, 1963)

With James Moody

- Comin' On Strong (Argo, 1963)

With Jimmy Owens

- Jimmy Owens (A&M/Horizon, 1976)
- Headin' Home (A&M/Horizon, 1978)

With Dave Pike

- Bossa Nova Carnival (New Jazz, 1962)

With Andrew Hill

- Divine Revelation (Steeplechase, 1975)
- Invitation (Steeplechase, 1976)

With Lalo Schifrin

- Bossa Nova: New Brazilian Jazz (Audio Fidelity, 1962)
- Piano, Strings and Bossa Nova (MGM, 1962)

With Quincy Jones

- Big Band Bossa Nova (Mercury, 1962)
