= Hommage (album) =

Studio album by Andrew Hill
- Released: 1975
- Recorded: May 19–20 and July 31, 1975
- Genre: Jazz
- Length: 37:43
- Label: East Wind
- Producer: Kiyoski Itoh

Andrew Hill chronology
Blue Black (1975)	Hommage (1975)	Divine Revelation (1975)

Hommage is an album (and first solo album) by American jazz pianist Andrew Hill, recorded in 1975 and originally released on the Japanese East Wind label. The album features six of Hill's original compositions and one interpretation of a Duke Ellington tune.

== Reception ==
Professional ratings
Review scores
Source	Rating
AllMusic	4/5 stars
The Penguin Guide to Jazz	3/4 stars

The AllMusic review by Scott Yanow awarded the album 4 stars and stated "The music is thoughtful, lyrical, and unpredictable, well worth several listens. Hommage is recommended as are virtually all of Andrew Hill's unique and valuable recordings."

== Track listing ==
All compositions by Andrew Hill except as indicated

1. "East 9th Street" – 3:24
2. "Naked Spirit" – 6:20
3. "Insanity Riff" – 3:33
4. "Sophisticated Lady" (Duke Ellington, Irving Mills, Mitchell Parish) – 5:22
5. "Clayton Gone" – 6:34
6. "Vision" – 3:51
7. "Rambling" – 8:39

- Recorded at Vanguard Studio, New York City on May 19 & 20 and July 31, 1975

== Personnel ==
- Andrew Hill – piano
