= Judgment! =

Studio album by Andrew Hill
- Released: September 1964
- Recorded: January 8, 1964
- Studios: Van Gelder Studio, Englewood Cliffs, New Jersey, U.S.
- Genres: Post bop; modal jazz; avant-garde jazz
- Length: 42:57
- Labels: Blue Note Records; BST 84159
- Producer: Alfred Lion

Andrew Hill chronology
Smoke Stack (1964)	Judgment! (1964)	Point of Departure (1964)

Professional ratings
Review scores
Source	Rating
AllMusic	4.5/5 stars
The Penguin Guide to Jazz Recordings	3.5/4 stars

Judgment! is a studio album by American jazz pianist Andrew Hill, recorded and released in 1964 on Blue Note Records. Accompanied by drummer Elvin Jones, bassist Richard Davis, and vibraphonist Bobby Hutcherson, Hill weaves his music around complex harmonic structures.

== The pieces ==
The first track, "Siete Ocho", meaning "Seven Eight", is in 7/8. "Flea Flop" was named "for the first notes of the melody, which seemed to suggest a jumping flea. This is also dedicated to the hotels and motels that jazz sidemen are obliged to stay in all over the country." The composition "Yokada Yokada" was named after the song "Yakety Yak", referring to "senseless dialogue between people," whilst "Alfred" was dedicated to producer Alfred Lion because of his "natural understanding of jazz in general." The title track "Judgment" was inspired by a poem written by Hill's wife, Lavern. "Reconciliation" addresses "the adjustment every musician has to make to achieve unity and harmony with the rest of the group."

== Track listing ==
All compositions by Andrew Hill

1. "Siete Ocho" – 8:58
2. "Flea Flop" – 7:21
3. "Yokada Yokada" – 5:17
4. "Alfred" – 7:04
5. "Judgment" – 6:53
6. "Reconciliation" – 7:24
7. "Yokada Yokada" [alternate take] – 5:12 Bonus track on CD

== Personnel ==
- Andrew Hill – piano
- Bobby Hutcherson – vibraphone
- Richard Davis – bass
- Elvin Jones – drums
