= A Beautiful Day (album) =

Live album by Andrew Hill
- Released: 2002
- Recorded: January 24–26, 2002
- Genre: Jazz
- Length: 61:28
- Label: Palmetto
- Producer: Matt Balitsaris

Andrew Hill chronology
Dusk (1999)	A Beautiful Day (2002)	The Day the World Stood Still (2004)

A Beautiful Day is a live album by American jazz pianist Andrew Hill, recorded in 2002 at Birdland in New York City and released on the Palmetto label.

== Reception ==
Professional ratings
Review scores
Source	Rating
Allmusic	4/5 stars
The Penguin Guide to Jazz Recordings	3/4 stars

The Allmusic review by David R. Adler awarded the album 4 stars and stated "this remarkable live album... boasts a large ensemble, billed at Birdland and previous gigs as the Andrew Hill Sextet + 11. Despite a large regiment of horns, Hill's reflective piano figures prominently... With its wide array of available textures and juxtapositions, the big band proves an ideal vehicle for Hill's powerful, unclassifiable music".

== Track listing ==
All compositions by Andrew Hill.

1. "Divine Revelation" – 8:19
2. "Faded Beauty" – 11:28
3. "Bellezza" – 8:43
4. "5 Mo" – 6:42
5. "New Pinnochio" – 7:36
6. "J Di" – 5:50
7. "A Beautiful Day" – 11:44
8. "11/8" – 1:06
- Recorded at Birdland, New York City on January 24–26, 2002

== Personnel ==
- Andrew Hill – piano
- John Savage – flute (tracks 2 & 4), alto saxophone (tracks 1, 3 & 5–8)
- Marty Ehrlich – clarinet (track 4), bass clarinet (track 2), alto saxophone (tracks 1, 3 & 5–8)
- Aaron Stewart, Greg Tardy – tenor saxophone
- J. D. Parran – baritone saxophone
- Dave Ballou, Laurie Frink, Ron Horton (tracks 1–6), Bruce Staelens – trumpet
- Mike Fahn, Joe Fielder, Charlie Gordon – trombone
- Jose D'avila – tuba
- Scott Colley – bass
- Nasheet Waits – drums
