= Les Trinitaires =

Live album by Andrew Hill
- Released: 1998
- Recorded: February 10–11, 1998
- Genre: Jazz
- Length: 60:24
- Label: Jazz Friends

Andrew Hill chronology
Dreams Come True (1993)	Les Trinitaires (1998)	Dusk (1999)

Les Trinitaires is a live album of a solo performance by American jazz pianist Andrew Hill recorded in 1998 in Metz, France and released on the Jazz Friends label. The album features five of Hill's original compositions with one alternate take, two jazz standards, and two compositions by Hill's musical associates.

== Reception ==
Professional ratings
Review scores
Source	Rating
Allmusic	2.5/5 stars
The Penguin Guide to Jazz Recordings	3/4 stars

David Dupont of Allmusic stated "This is a stark, moody set, not the place to begin to explore Hill's prickly work with its angular, elusive melodies. His solo presentation is stark and ruminative. For those already engaged with his work, this offers a glimpse of the skeletal foundations of compositions".

== Track listing ==
All compositions by Andrew Hill except as indicated

1. "Joanne" – 9:10
2. "What's New?" (Johnny Burke, Bob Haggart) – 9:06
3. "Little Spain" (Clifford Jordan) – 11:30
4. "15/8" – 4:31
5. "Metz" – 5:17
6. "Dusk" [Take 1] – 7:58
7. "Labyrinth" – 6:03
8. "Seven" (Russel Baba) – 5:01
9. "Dusk" [Take 2] – 6:51
10. "I'll Be Seeing You" (Sammy Fain, Irving Kahal) – 5:37

- Recorded at Trinitaires Jazz Club, Metz, France on February 10 & 11, 1998

== Personnel ==
- Andrew Hill – piano
