= From California with Love =

Studio album by Andrew Hill
- Released: 1979
- Recorded: October 12, 1978
- Genre: Jazz
- Length: 38:42
- Label: Artists House

Andrew Hill chronology
| Nefertiti (1976) | From California with Love (1979) | Strange Serenade (1980) |

From California with Love is an album by American jazz pianist Andrew Hill, recorded in 1978 and released on the Artists House label. The album features two of Hill's original compositions.

== Reception ==
Professional ratings
Review scores
| Source | Rating |
|---|---|
| AllMusic | 3/5 stars |
| DownBeat | 4/5 stars |

The Globe and Mail wrote that Hill "is a free player, but one with a gentle disposition, and here he builds two side-long solos ... on ideas more than energy."

The AllMusic review by Scott Yanow stated: "The creative pianist is heard on two sidelong solo improvisations on this excellent LP, building his solos from fairly simple themes into works of great complexity and individuality".

== Track listing ==
All compositions by Andrew Hill except as indicated

1. "From California with Love" - 19:57
2. "Reverend DuBop" - 18:45

- Recorded at Fantasy Studios, Berkeley, California on October 12, 1978

== Personnel ==
- Andrew Hill - piano
