= Blue Black (album) =

Studio album by Andrew Hill
- Released: 1975
- Recorded: February 26, 1975
- Studio: C.I. Recording Studio, New York City
- Genre: Jazz
- Length: 37:02
- Label: East Wind
- Producer: Kiyoski Itoh

Andrew Hill chronology
Spiral (1974-75)	Blue Black (1975)	Hommage (1975)

Blue Black is an album by American jazz pianist Andrew Hill recorded in 1975 and released on the Japanese East Wind label. The album features five of Hill's original compositions performed by a quartet with saxophonist/flautist Jimmy Vass, bassist Chris White and drummer Leroy Williams.

== Reception ==
Professional ratings
Review scores
Source	Rating
Allmusic	4/5 stars
The Penguin Guide to Jazz Recordings	3/4 stars

The Allmusic review by Ken Dryden awarded the album 4 stars and stated "This 1975 session consists of five challenging originals". Jon Kelman, reviewer for the website All About Jazz, notes that "Hill's playing continues to be filled with the idiosyncrasies, quirky and disjointed but at the same time surprisingly supple. Even on the more relaxed 'Mist Flower,' with Vass' flute creating a softer ambience, Hill finds ways to infiltrate the relative calm with vividly blocky chords and strong phrases that seem to stretch and compress time."

== Track listing ==
All compositions by Andrew Hill.

1. "Golden Spook" - 10:33
2. "Mist Flower" - 7:28
3. "Remnants" - 5:58
4. "Blue Black" - 7:18
5. "One For" - 5:45

== Personnel ==
- Andrew Hill - piano
- Jimmy Vass - flute (track 2), soprano saxophone (tracks 4–5), alto saxophone (tracks 1 & 3)
- Chris White - bass
- Leroy Williams - drums
