= So in Love (Andrew Hill album) =

So In Love

Studio album by Andrew Hill
- Released: 1960
- Recorded: 1959
- Genre: Hard bop
- Label: Warwick Records
- Producer: Fred Mendelsohn

Andrew Hill chronology
So In Love (1960)	Black Fire (1963)

Professional ratings
Review scores
Source	Rating
Allmusic	3/5 stars
The Penguin Guide to Jazz Recordings	3/4 stars

So In Love is the debut studio album by American jazz pianist Andrew Hill, recorded in 1959 and released by Warwick Records in 1960.

== Track listing ==
1. So In Love
2. Chiconga
3. Body and Soul
4. Old Devil Moon
5. Spring Is Here
6. Penthouse Party
7. That's All

== Personnel ==
- Andrew Hill – piano
- Malachi Favors – bass
- James Slaughter – drums
