= Scatman John discography =

- Studio albums: 5
- Extended plays: 1
- Compilation albums: 1
- Singles: 8
- Music videos: 5

The discography of Scatman John, an American scat and dance musician occasionally known under his real name John Larkin, consists of five studio albums, one compilation album, eight singles and five music videos.

== Albums ==
=== Studio albums ===
List of studio albums, with selected chart positions and certifications
Title	Album details	Peak chart positions									Certifications
Title	Album details	AUT	BEL	FIN	GER	NL	NOR	SWE	SWI	UK	Certifications
John Larkin	Released: 1986 (US); Label: Transition; Formats: LP	—	—	—	—	—	—	—	—	—	
John Larkin Sings / Listen to the Scatman	Released: 1990 (original) December 11, 2001 (US); Label: Self-released (original), Stunt; Formats: Cassette (original), CD, digital download	—	—	—	—	—	—	—	—	—	
Scatman's World	Released: July 10, 1995 (GER); Label: RCA; Formats: CD, LP, cassette, digital download	25	11	1	6	20	6	42	4	104	IFPI SWE: Gold; SNEP: Gold; RIAJ: Million; ZPAV: Gold
Everybody Jam!	Released: November 25, 1996 (GER); Label: RCA; Formats: CD, cassette, digital download	—	81	—	78	—	—	—	45	—	
Take Your Time	Released: June 1, 1999 (US); Label: RCA; Formats: CD, cassette, digital download	—	—	—	96	—	—	—	—	—	
"—" denotes a recording that did not chart or was not released in that territory.

=== Compilation albums ===
List of compilation albums
Title	Album details
The Best of Scatman John	Released: October 7, 2002 (US); Label: Bertelsmann; Formats: CD, digital download

== Singles ==
Title	Year	Peak chart positions										Certifications	Album
Title	Year	US	AUS	AUT	BEL	FRA	GER	NL	SWE	SWI	UK	Certifications	Album
"Scatman (Ski-Ba-Bop-Ba-Dop-Bop)"	1994	60	8	1	1	1	2	2	2	1	3	ARIA: Gold; BPI: Gold; BVMI: Platinum; IFPI AUT: Gold; IFPI SWI: Gold; SNEP: Platinum	Scatman's World
"Scatman's World"	1995	—	84	4	1	1	1	4	10	3	10	BVMI: Platinum; IFPI AUT: Gold; IFPI SWI: Gold; SNEP: Gold	Scatman's World
"Song of Scatland"	1995	—	—	—	—	39	46	—	—	—	—		Scatman's World
"Su Su Su Super Ki Re i"	1996	—	—	—	—	—	—	—	—	—	—		Everybody Jam!
"Everybody Jam!"	1996	—	—	—	53	—	46	—	—	—	—		Everybody Jam!
"Let It Go"	1997	—	—	—	—	—	—	—	—	—	—		Everybody Jam!
"Steal the Base"	1998	—	—	—	—	—	—	—	—	—	—		Major League 3: Back to the Minors
"Scatmambo"	1998	—	—	—	—	—	—	—	—	—	—		Take Your Time
"The Chickadee Song"	1999	—	—	—	—	—	—	—	—	—	—		Take Your Time
"Take Your Time"	1999	—	—	—	—	—	—	—	—	—	—		Take Your Time
"Scatman & Hatman" * (with Lou Bega)	2019	—	—	—	—	—	—	—	—	—	—		
"Can You Hear Me" *	2025	—	—	—	—	—	—	—	—	—	—		Scatman's World
"—" denotes a recording that did not chart or was not released in that territory. "*" denotes a recording released posthumously.

=== Music videos ===
Year	Title	Director	Album	Ref(s)
1994	"Scatman (Ski-Ba-Bop-Ba-Dop-Bop)"	Kerstin Mueller	Scatman's World	
1995	"Scatman's World"	Martin Weisz	Scatman's World	
1995	"Song of Scatland"	Martin Weisz	Scatman's World	
1996	"Su Su Su Super Ki Re i"		Everybody Jam! (Japanese bonus track)	
1996	"Everybody Jam!"	Hannes Rossacher	Everybody Jam!	
