= Scat Paradise =

EP by Scatman John
- Released: December 16, 1995
- Genre: Pop; Eurodance; house; techno; jazz
- Length: 23 min
- Label: RCA Records
- Producer: Scatman John

Scatman John chronology
Scatman's World (1995)	Scat Paradise (1995)	Everybody Jam! (1996)

Scat Paradise ("スキャット天国") is a Scatman John EP released only in Japan. It features the song "Hey, You!", a rarity previously only available as the B-side to the "Song of Scatland" single and later remixed and re-released as "U-Turn" on the Everybody Jam! album.

"Jazzology" is an ode to the history of jazz and musicians that have inspired the Scatman. The track was recorded exclusively for this EP and was later made available on the Japanese pressing of Everybody Jam! and on 2002's The Best of Scatman John.

The disc is rounded off with remixes and karaoke versions of his two best known songs, "Scatman (Ski Ba Bop Ba Dop Bop)" and "Scatman's World". Scat Paradise reached #45 in Japan, and sold 30,000 copies.

== EP track listing ==
1. "Hey, You!" – 3:46
2. "Jazzology" – 3:53
3. "Scatman (Ski Ba Bop Ba Dop Bop)" [Jazz Level] – 3:41
4. "Scatman's World" [US Remix] – 4:08
5. "Scatman (Ski-Ba-Bop-Ba-Dop-Bop)" [Karaoke] – 3:33
6. "Scatman's World" [Karaoke] – 3:54
