= Softly, as in a Morning Sunrise =

Operetta song and jazz standard

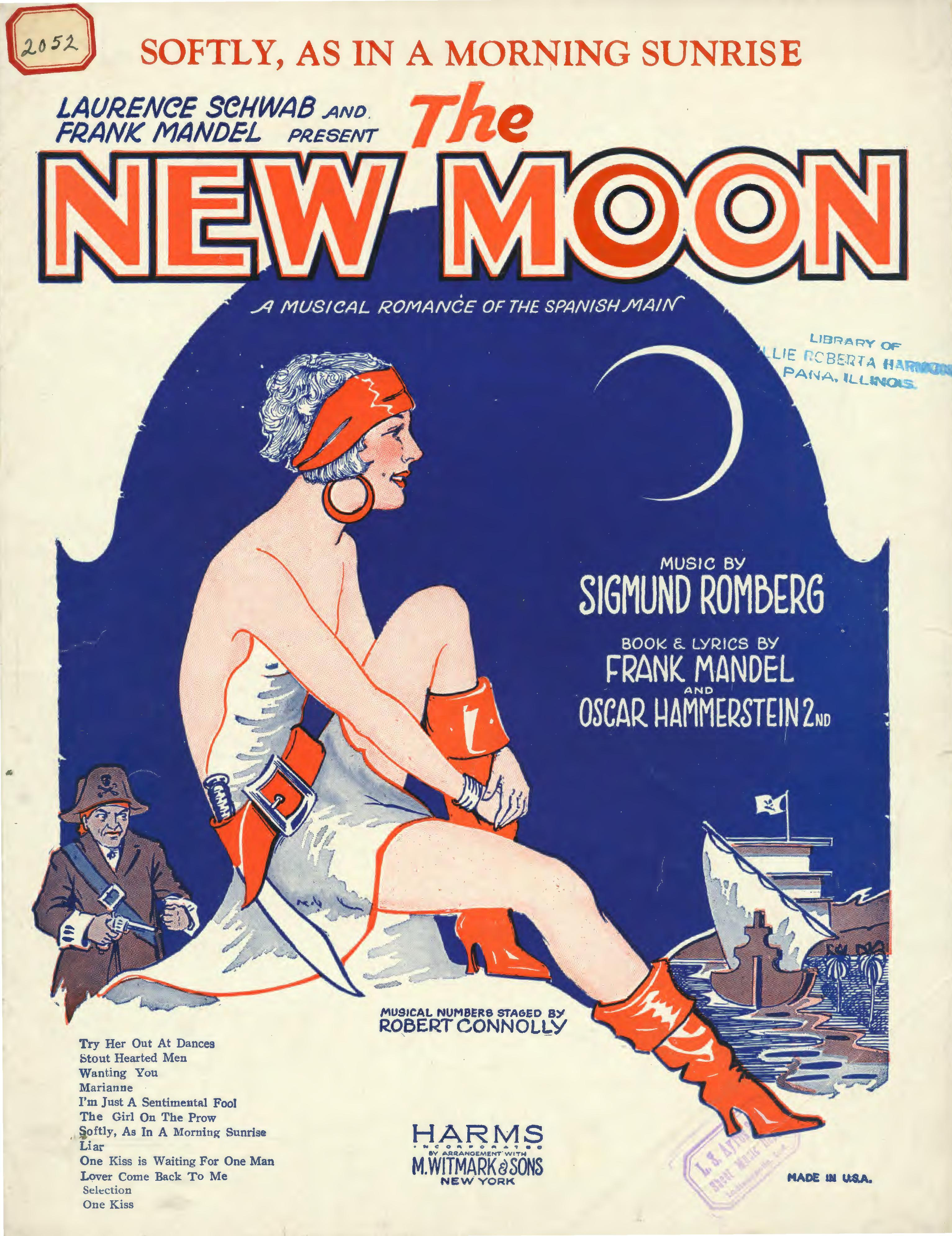
Sheet music cover, 1928

"Softly, as in a Morning Sunrise" is a song with music by Sigmund Romberg and lyrics by Oscar Hammerstein II from the 1928 operetta The New Moon. One of the best-known numbers from the show, it is a song of bitterness and yearning for a lost love, sung in the show by Philippe (tenor), the best friend of the hero, Robert Mission (baritone).

The original song was composed as a tango, and features a dance as accompaniment to the choral reprise, but many versions of the song have changed the tempo completely (there have been many jazz renditions). The one featured in the 1940 film version of the operetta is sung as a cheerful ditty by Nelson Eddy while he shines his shoes, despite the melancholy nature of the song's lyric.

The song is featured twice in Deep in My Heart, MGM's 1954 musical biopic of Romberg, when it is sung by Betty Wand (dubbing for Tamara Toumanova) and by Helen Traubel.

== Cover versions ==
- Paul Chambers – Paul Chambers Quintet (1958)
- Ray Alexander – Cloud Patterns (1984)
- Dorothy Ashby – Django/Misty (1984)
- Chet Baker and Wolfgang Lackerschmid – Ballads for Two (1979)
- Kenny Barron and Regina Carter – Freefall (2001)
- George Benson – Irreplaceable (2004)
- Don Braden – The Time is Now (1991)
- Royce Campbell – Six by Six: A Jazz Guitar Celebration (1994)
- Ron Carter – Where? (1961)
- Ron Carter and Jim Hall - Alone Together (1972)
- June Christy – Something Cool (1955)
- Sonny Clark – Sonny Clark Trio (1957)
- John Coltrane – Live! at the Village Vanguard (1962)
- Bing Crosby – New Tricks (1957)
- Bobby Darin – That's All (1959)
- Miles Davis – In Person Friday and Saturday Nights at the Blackhawk (2003)
- Eric Dolphy – The Illinois Concert (1963)
- Jenny Evans – Shiny Stockings (1997)
- Lesley Garrett – Soprano in Red (1996)
- Stan Getz and Kenny Barron – People Time (2010)
- The Great Jazz Trio – The Great Jazz Trio at the Village Vanguard Again (1977)
- Vince Guaraldi – A Flower Is a Lovesome Thing (1958)
- Freddie Hubbard – Above & Beyond (1982)
- J. J. Johnson – Things Are Getting Better All the Time (1984)
- Wynton Kelly - Kelly Blue (1959)
- John Larkin – John Larkin (1986), re-released on his compilation album Listen to the Scatman (2001)
- Abbey Lincoln – Abbey Is Blue (1959)
- Ellis Marsalis – On the First Occasion (2004)
- Helen Merrill – The Nearness of You (1957)
- Modern Jazz Quartet - Concorde (album) (1955), The Last Concert (1975, re-released as The Complete Last Concert in 1988)
- Dianne Reeves – I Remember (1991)
- Emily Remler – East to Wes (1988)
- Patricio Rey y sus Redonditos de Ricota – La Bestia Pop (Argentina, 1985)
- Marc Ribot – Yo! I Killed Your God (1992–4)
- Sonny Rollins – A Night at the Village Vanguard (1958)
- Doreen Shaffer (with the Moon Invaders) – Groovin' with the Moon Invaders (2009)
- Artie Shaw (arranged by Jerry Gray) helped popularize the tune with his recording in 1938.
- Nat Shilkret and the Victor Orchestra (vocal by Franklyn Baur), made the first hit recording in 1928.
- Frank Sinatra Jr. – That Face! (2006)
- Takeshi Terauchi & Bunnys – The World Is Waiting for Terry (1967)
- Hiromi Uehara – Beyond Standard (2008)
- Roseanna Vitro – Softly (1993)
- Dave Weckl – Master Plan (1990)
- Larry Young – Unity (1965)
- Ori Dagan – Songs of the Roaring Twenties (2020)
- Tigran Hamasyan – StandArt (2022)
- John Scofield – John Scofield Live (1977)
- Fred Hersch, Bill Frisell – Songs We Know (1998)
- Moreira Chonguica, Manu Dibango - M&M (2017)
- Kenny Barron – Beyond This Place (2024)
- D'Eva - David Haines on Piano, Eva Gray (actress) vocals (2026)

== See also ==
- List of 1920s jazz standards
- "Walk, Don't Run" -- contrafact of this song
