= List of European number-one hits of 1995 =

This is a list of the European Music & Media magazine's European Hot 100 Singles and European Top 100 Albums number-ones of 1995.

Issue date	Song	Artist	Album	Artist
7 January	"Cotton Eye Joe"	Rednex	Live at the BBC	The Beatles
14 January	"Cotton Eye Joe"	Rednex	Cross Road	Bon Jovi
21 January	"Cotton Eye Joe"	Rednex	Cross Road	Bon Jovi
28 January	"Cotton Eye Joe"	Rednex	No Need to Argue	The Cranberries
4 February	"Cotton Eye Joe"	Rednex	No Need to Argue	The Cranberries
11 February	"Cotton Eye Joe"	Rednex	No Need to Argue	The Cranberries
18 February	"Here Comes The Hotstepper"	Ini Kamoze	No Need to Argue	The Cranberries
25 February	"Here Comes The Hotstepper"	Ini Kamoze	No Need to Argue	The Cranberries
4 March	"Here Comes The Hotstepper"	Ini Kamoze	No Need to Argue	The Cranberries
11 March	"Here Comes The Hotstepper"	Ini Kamoze	No Need to Argue	The Cranberries
18 March	"Here Comes The Hotstepper"	Ini Kamoze	No Need to Argue	The Cranberries
25 March	"Here Comes The Hotstepper"	Ini Kamoze	Greatest Hits	Bruce Springsteen
1 April	"Here Comes The Hotstepper"	Ini Kamoze	Greatest Hits	Bruce Springsteen
8 April	"Here Comes The Hotstepper"	Ini Kamoze	Greatest Hits	Bruce Springsteen
15 April	"Scatman (Ski-Ba-Bop-Ba-Dop-Bop)"	Scatman John	Greatest Hits	Bruce Springsteen
22 April	"Back for Good"	Take That	Greatest Hits	Bruce Springsteen
29 April	"Back for Good"	Take That	Greatest Hits	Bruce Springsteen
6 May	"Back for Good"	Take That	Greatest Hits	Bruce Springsteen
13 May	"Back for Good"	Take That	Greatest Hits	Bruce Springsteen
20 May	"Back for Good"	Take That	Nobody Else	Take That
27 May	"Scatman (Ski-Ba-Bop-Ba-Dop-Bop)"	Scatman John	Nobody Else	Take That
3 June	"Scatman (Ski-Ba-Bop-Ba-Dop-Bop)"	Scatman John	Nobody Else	Take That
10 June	"Scatman (Ski-Ba-Bop-Ba-Dop-Bop)"	Scatman John	Nobody Else	Take That
17 June	"Scatman (Ski-Ba-Bop-Ba-Dop-Bop)"	Scatman John	Nobody Else	Take That
24 June	"Scream"	Michael Jackson & Janet Jackson	P·U·L·S·E	Pink Floyd
1 July	"Scream"	Michael Jackson & Janet Jackson	P·U·L·S·E	Pink Floyd
8 July	"Scream"	Michael Jackson & Janet Jackson	HIStory: Past, Present and Future, Book 1	Michael Jackson
15 July	"Scream"	Michael Jackson & Janet Jackson	HIStory: Past, Present and Future, Book 1	Michael Jackson
22 July	"Have You Ever Really Loved a Woman?"	Bryan Adams	HIStory: Past, Present and Future, Book 1	Michael Jackson
29 July	"Have You Ever Really Loved a Woman?"	Bryan Adams	These Days	Bon Jovi
5 August	"Shy Guy"	Diana King	These Days	Bon Jovi
12 August	"Shy Guy"	Diana King	These Days	Bon Jovi
19 August	"Shy Guy"	Diana King	These Days	Bon Jovi
26 August	"Scatman's World"	Scatman John	These Days	Bon Jovi
2 September	"Scatman's World"	Scatman John	These Days	Bon Jovi
9 September	"Scatman's World"	Scatman John	These Days	Bon Jovi
16 September	"You Are Not Alone"	Michael Jackson	HIStory: Past, Present and Future, Book 1	Michael Jackson
23 September	"You Are Not Alone"	Michael Jackson	HIStory: Past, Present and Future, Book 1	Michael Jackson
30 September	"You Are Not Alone"	Michael Jackson	One Hot Minute	Red Hot Chili Peppers
7 October	"You Are Not Alone"	Michael Jackson	One Hot Minute	Red Hot Chili Peppers
14 October	"You Are Not Alone"	Michael Jackson	Ballbreaker	AC/DC
21 October	"You Are Not Alone"	Michael Jackson	Ballbreaker	AC/DC
28 October	"You Are Not Alone"	Michael Jackson	Life	Simply Red
4 November	"Boombastic"	Shaggy	Life	Simply Red
11 November	"Gangsta's Paradise"	Coolio featuring L.V.	Life	Simply Red
18 November	"Gangsta's Paradise"	Coolio featuring L.V.	Life	Simply Red
25 November	"Gangsta's Paradise"	Coolio featuring L.V.	Made in Heaven	Queen
2 December	"Gangsta's Paradise"	Coolio featuring L.V.	Made in Heaven	Queen
9 December	"Gangsta's Paradise"	Coolio featuring L.V.	Made in Heaven	Queen
16 December	"Gangsta's Paradise"	Coolio featuring L.V.	Anthology 1	The Beatles
23 December	"Gangsta's Paradise"	Coolio featuring L.V.	Made in Heaven	Queen
30 December	"Gangsta's Paradise"	Coolio featuring L.V.	Made in Heaven	Queen

== See also ==
- 1995 in music
- List of number-one hits in Europe
