= Dagan =

Dagan may refer to:

- Dagán, Irish bishop in the early 7th century
- Dagan or Dagon, a Semitic fertility god
- Dagan languages
- Dagan (name), Hebrew given name and surname

== Places ==
- Dagan (大干), China, in Fujian's Shunchang County
- Dagan, Iran, a village in Kurdistan Province
- Beth Dagan, two cities in ancient Israel
- Beit Dagan, Israel

== See also ==
- Dagon (disambiguation)
