= Dagon (disambiguation) =

Dagon is an ancient Semitic god.

Dagon may also refer to:

- Dagon, name used by Josephus for Dok, ancient fortress near Jericho
- Dagon (butterfly), a butterfly genus
- Dagon (novel), a 1968 novel by Fred Chappell
- Dagon (Cthulhu Mythos), a deity in H. P. Lovecraft's Cthulhu Mythos
  - "Dagon" (short story), a 1917 short story by H. P. Lovecraft
  - Dagon (film), a 2001 film based on H. P. Lovecraft's novella The Shadow over Innsmouth
- Dagon (Dungeons & Dragons), a demon prince in Dungeons & Dragons
- Dagon (Devil May Cry), a demon from the video game Devil May Cry 4
- Dagon, California, a town in Amador County, California, USA
- Dagon International, a Burmese conglomerate
- Dagon Township, a neighborhood of Yangon, Myanmar
- Dagon University, a university in Yangon
- Dagon (planet) or Fomalhaut b, a former candidate exoplanet
- Nightrider (DC Comics) or Dagon, a DC Comics character
- The Dagons, a psychedelic band from Los Angeles
- Mehrunes Dagon, the main villain in The Elder Scrolls IV: Oblivion
- Dagon, a minor villain in the Jujutsu Kaisen series.

== See also ==
- Dagan (disambiguation)
- Dagoman
- Dogon (disambiguation)
- Dragon (disambiguation)
