= Dagan (name) =

Dagan (Hebrew: דגן) is a Hebrew name and a surname. Notable people and fictional characters with the name include:

== Surname ==
- Avigdor Dagan
- Bat-Sheva Dagan
- Benny Dagan
- Daniel Dagan
- Ezra Dagan
- Gedeon Dagan
- Hanoch Dagan, Israeli lawyer
- Jonathan Dagan better known as J.Views, American musician
- Maya Dagan (born 1975), Israeli actress
- Meir Dagan (1945–2016), former director of the Mossad
- Omer Dagan
- Ori Dagan
- Tzila Dagan (1946–2004), Israeli singer-songwriter
- Yossi Dagan

== Given name ==
- Dagan Yivzori (born 1985), Israeli basketball player

== Fictional characters ==
- Dagan Gera, a character in the 2023 action-adventure video game Star Wars: Jedi Survivor
- Reuven Dagan, Israeli psychologist, the main character of the Israeli TV drama series BeTipul
