= Everybody Jam! =

Studio album by Scatman John
- Released: November 25, 1996
- Genre: Pop; Eurodance; house; techno
- Length: 56:44; 1:12:26 (Japanese release)
- Label: RCA
- Producer: Ingo Kays; Antonio Nunzio Catania

Scatman John chronology
| Scat Paradise (1995) | Everybody Jam! (1996) | Take Your Time (1999) |

Singles from Everybody Jam!
- 1. "Everybody Jam!" Released: October 30, 1996; 2. "Let It Go" Released: 1997

Everybody Jam! is the second major label and third overall studio album by Scatman John. The album continues along the thematic lines of the first album but with an evolved sound, and cemented his popularity in Japan, released there with five bonus tracks.

The album released two international singles: the title track tribute to Louis Armstrong and "Let It Go", both of which were successful. The Japanese bonus tracks "Pripri Scat" and "Su Su Su Super Ki Re i" charted successfully in Japan as single releases. "The Invisible Man" is a cover of the Queen song, adding numerous ingredients not present in the original. Arguably the most popular song on the album is "U-Turn": a revamped version of "Hey You" which earlier appeared as the B-side to "Song of Scatland".

The album reached No. 45 in Switzerland. In Japan it reached No. 17 and remained in the Top 40 for 9 weeks, selling just under 100,000 copies, making it a minor success compared to Scatman's World, but still an accomplishment for a foreign artist.

== Album history ==
The album was originally intended to release in May, with the title "Journey Of Fantasy", but was delayed until November. "Only You" was the third single from the "Scatman's World" album. While Europe got the "Song Of Scatland" single, this was the Japanese release in its place. "Popstar" was another track released as a CD promo in 1995 by Gramaphone Records.

In October, John prepared a new single called "Everybody Jam!", inspired by Jazz, his love, and a tribute to his childhood idol Louis Armstrong. In a 1996 interview, John explains why he was inspired by Louis:

"Louis was the first and strongest influence on my musical existence. There have been many masters of music, of soul, but for me Louis is the father of them all.”

The single was followed in November by the album with the same title.

== Track listing ==
All tracks are written by Antonio Nunzio Catania and John Larkin, except where noted.

| No. | Title | Length |
|---|---|---|
| 1. | "Stop the Rain" | 4:06 |
| 2. | "Everybody Jam!" | 3:31 |
| 3. | "The Invisible Man" (Queen) | 3:26 |
| 4. | "Let It Go" | 3:47 |
| 5. | "Message to You" | 3:36 |
| 6. | "(I Want To) Be Someone" | 3:17 |
| 7. | "Scatmusic" | 3:57 |
| 8. | "Shut Your Mouth and Open Your Mind" (Catania, Ingo Kays, Larkin) | 3:54 |
| 9. | "(We Got To Learn To) Live Together" (Catania, Kays, Larkin) | 3:52 |
| 10. | "Ballad of Love" (Catania, Kays, Larkin) | 3:42 |
| 11. | "People of the Generation" | 3:44 |
| 12. | "Lebanon" | 3:34 |
| 13. | "U-Turn" | 3:47 |
| 14. | "Everybody Jam!" (Club Jam) | 5:41 |
| Total length: | | 56:44 |

Japanese bonus tracks
| No. | Title | Length |
|---|---|---|
| 15. | "Paa Pee Poo Pae Po" | 3:50 |
| 16. | "I'm Free" | 3:37 |
| 17. | "Jazzology" | 3:53 |
| 18. | "Pripri Scat" (Radio edit) | 3:16 |
| 19. | "Su Su Su Super Ki Re i" (Radio edit) | 3:56 |
