= Win Aung (businessman) =

Burmese businessman

Dagon Win Aung
- ဒဂုံ ဝင်းအောင်
- Born: 30 September 1953 (age 72); Prome, Burma
- Other names: Win Aung
- Education: B.Sc Mechanical Engineering
- Occupation: Businessman
- Organization(s): Dagon International, UMFCCI
- Spouse(s): Moe Mya Mya (Yew Hoon See), b. 1958
- Children: Ei Hnin Pwint (Christabelle Aung)b. 1981; Thurein Aung (Christopher Aung) b. 1982; Ei Hnin Khine (Christina Aung), b. 1983

Dagon Win Aung (Burmese: ဒဂုံ ဝင်းအောင်) is a Burmese businessman and chairman of the Union of Myanmar Federation of Chambers of Commerce and Industry (UMFCCI). He founded Dagon International, a construction company, in the 1990s, with Win Thein, a Myanmar Army captain. He has since expanded his business empire to the timber trade, construction and import-export sectors. Following Cyclone Nargis in 2008, his company was awarded with government contracts for various reconstruction projects in the Irrawaddy delta.
