= Doggone =

Doggone may refer to:

- Doggone Cats, a 1947-released Warner Bros. cartoon in the Merrie Melodies series
- "Doggone Crazy", an episode of the animated television series King Of The Hill
- "Doggone Right", a 1969 single recorded by Smokey Robinson & The Miracles
- Doggone Sauce, a gourmet hot sauce company created to donate proceeds to Animal Shelters and Humane Societies
- "I'll Be Doggone", a 1965 song recorded by American soul singer Marvin Gaye
- "So Doggone Lonesome", a song written by country singer Johnny Cash

== See also ==
- Dogon (disambiguation)
