= Dagen =

Dagen may refer to:

== Newspapers ==
- Dagen (Danish newspaper)
- Dagen (1803–1843), defunct Danish newspaper
- Dagen (Norwegian newspaper)
- Dagen (Swedish newspaper)
- Dagen (1845–1846), defunct Swedish newspaper
- Dagen (1896–1920), defunct Swedish newspaper

== People with the surname ==
- Lacy Dagen (born 1997), American artistic gymnast

== People with the first name ==
- Dagen McDowell (born 1969), American business news anchor

== Other uses ==
- Dagen, Iran, a village in Kurdistan Province, Iran
