= Dogon =

Dogon may refer to:

- Dogon people, an ethnic group living in the central plateau region of Mali, in West Africa
- Dogon languages, a small, close-knit language family spoken by the Dogon people of Mali
- Dogon A.D., an album by saxophonist Julius Hemphill
- Musa Dogon Yaro (1945–2008), Nigerian sprinter
- Jean-Luc Dogon (born 1967), French football coach and a former player
- Dōgon (restaurant), an American restaurant of African and Caribbean cuisine

== See also ==
- Dagon (disambiguation)
- Drogon (disambiguation)
- Doggone (disambiguation)
