= Union of Myanmar Federation of Chambers of Commerce and Industry =

- ကုန်သည်များနှင့် စက်မှုလက်မှုလုပ်ငန်းရှင်များအသင်း
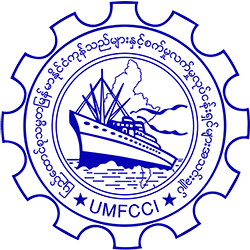
- Founded: 1919
- Founder: Sir U Thwin
- Type: Advocacy group
- Purpose: Business and Industry advocacy
- Location: Yangon
- Region served: Myanmar
- Method: Media attention, direct-appeal campaigns Political lobbying
- Key people: Aye Win, President
- Website: www.umfcci.com.mm
- Formerly called: Burmese Chamber of Commerce

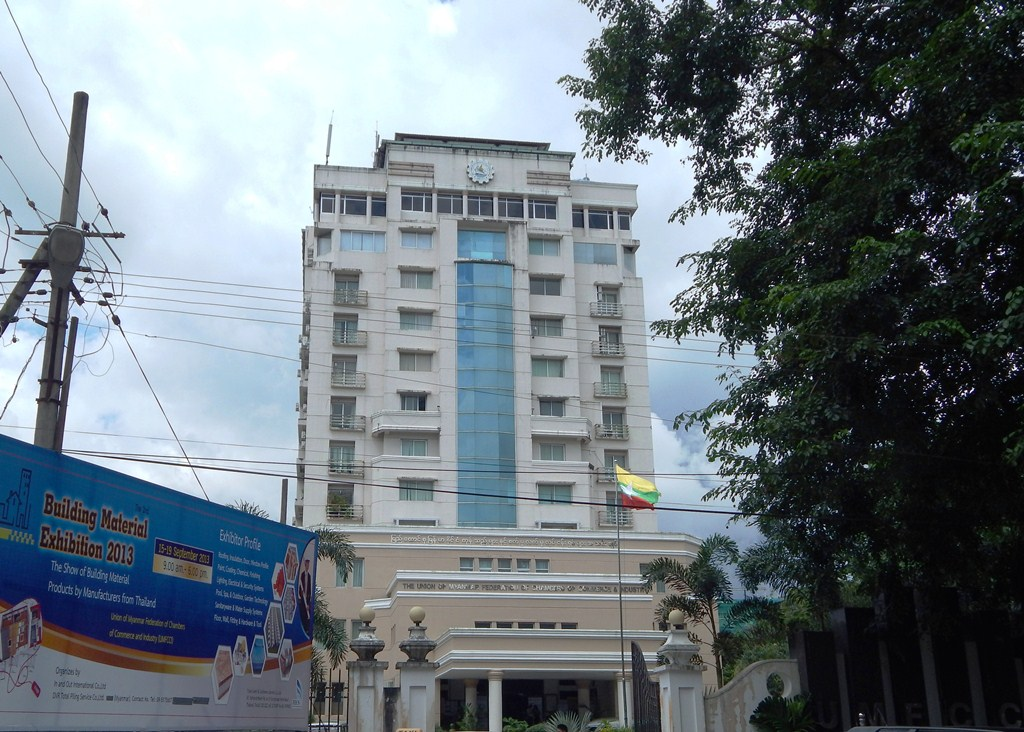
UMFCCI building in Yangon

The Union of Myanmar Federation of Chambers of Commerce and Industry (UMFCCI) is a national level non-governmental organization representing and safeguarding the interests of the private business sector.

Founded in 1919 as the Burmese Chamber of Commerce, UMFCCI comprises 16 Regional and State Chambers' of Commerce and Industry, nine Border Trade Associations, 76 Affiliated Associations and about 30,000 members.

The UMFCCI acts as a bridge between the State and the private sector presenting the views and interests of business to the Union Government.

The UMFCCI supports the business community by sharing knowledge, expertise and opportunities. Services that the UMFCCI provides include human resource development training, trade information, business facilitation, business matching and consultancy, trade fairs, seminars, workshops, forum and study tours.
