= Su Su Su Super Ki Re i =

"Su Su Su Super キ・レ・イ"

Single by Scatman John
- Released: 23 March 1996
- Genre: Dance; pop
- Length: 22:43
- Label: RCA Records
- Producer: Tsugutoshi Goto

Scatman John singles chronology
| "Only You" (1996) | "Su Su Su Super キ・レ・イ" (1996) | "Pripri Scat" (1996) |

"Su Su Su Super キ・レ・イ" (Rōmaji: "Kirei" meaning "beautiful") is a Scatman John single, recorded in Japan with Japanese backing musicians and released there as a tie-in to a cosmetics commercial. The song was his highest-charting single in Japan, reaching no. 16. The song is based on a series of catchy loops of party lyrics. The B-side is a solo piano cover of the Elvis Presley song "Love Me Tender", dubbed the "L.A. Unplugged Mix".

The commercials feature a slightly different mix of the track and feature Scatman speaking Japanese and promoting the product in a variety of situations, interacting with the Japanese performers. There were 4 different commercials in total, the 2nd and 4th being slight variations on the 1st and 3rd.

There was also a music video for this track. It begins with Scatman producing a bouquet of flowers like a magic trick, and goes on to show Scatman riding around in a circle on a miniature trike. Later shots show Scatman dancing in a CGI kitchen and in what looks like a cellar. Unlike all other Scatman John music videos, it was never officially uploaded to Youtube, though a few unofficial uploads exist.

== Single track listing ==
All lyrics are written by John Larkin and Brian Adler; all music is composed by Tsugutoshi Goto, except where noted.

| No. | Title | Lyrics | Music | Length |
|---|---|---|---|---|
| 1. | "Su Su Su Super キ・レ・イ" (Radio Edit) | | | 3:59 |
| 2. | "Su Su Su Super キ・レ・イ" (All Night Long Mix) | | | 5:32 |
| 3. | "Su Su Su Super キ・レ・イ" (Karaoke) | | | 3:57 |
| 4. | "Scatman (Ski Ba Dop Ba Dop Bop)" (Extended Radio) | Larkin; Antonio Nunzio Catania | Larkin; Catania | 5:11 |
| 5. | "Love Me Tender" (L.A. Unplugged Mix) | Ken Darby | George R. Poulton | 4:04 |

== Personnel ==
- Keyboard, producer: Tsugutoshi Goto
- Synthesizer: Mituji Horikawa
- Electric guitar: Masaki Suzukawa
- Keyboard: Haruo Togasi
- Chorus: Mai Yamane
- Recorded by Masahiko Kokubo
- Mixed by Yosinori Kaji
- Cover design by Akihiro Ijima

== Charts ==
=== Weekly charts ===
| Chart (1996) | Peak position |
|---|---|
| Japan (Oricon) | 16 |
