= Buddha Sāsana Nuggaha =

Buddhist lay organisation in Yangon, Myanmar

- ဗုဒ္ဓသာသနာနုဂ္ဂဟ; Buddhasāsana Nuggaha
- Formation: 13 November 1947; 78 years ago
- Founded at: Yangon, Myanmar
- Purpose: Advance the Buddhist pariyatti and patipatti studies
- Headquarters: Yangon, Myanmar
- Affiliations: Mahasi Sasana Yeiktha

Buddha Sāsana Nuggaha (Burmese: ဗုဒ္ဓသာသနာနုဂ္ဂဟ; Pali: Buddhasāsana Nuggaha) is a Buddhist lay association based in Yangon, Myanmar (Burma). The organization was founded on 13 November 1947 by U Nu, Sir U Thwin, and other laypeople. The organization was founded to advance the study of Buddhist pariyatti and patipatti.

The present-day Mahasi Sasana Yeiktha (retreat center) established by Mahasi Sayadaw for the vipassana movement is based on the grounds of the organization in Kokkaing, Yangon. Following the 1962 Burmese coup d'état, many key members of U Nu's government retired to the Sasana Yeiktha.
