= Sir U Thwin =

Burmese merchant and philanthropist

- ဆာဦးသွင်
- Born: Thwin; 1878; Moulmein, British Burma
- Died: 1966 (aged 87–88)
- Other name: The Rice Wizard
- Occupations: Merchant; philanthropist; Buddhist lay leader
- Spouse: Daw Thein

Sir U Thwin (Burmese: ဆာဦးသွင်; 1878–1966) was a Burmese merchant during the British colonial period and the early years of independent Myanmar (Burma). Born in Moulmein, he became involved in the rice trade in Rangoon (Yangon) and later played roles in business, community, and Buddhist organisations. He was associated with the establishment of the Burma Chamber of Commerce and supported Buddhist institutions, including the reconstruction of Botahtaung Pagoda and the development of the Mahasi Meditation Centre. He received the title of Sir from the British government in 1941.

== Early life ==
U Thwin was born in 1878 in Moulmein, British Burma. Coming from a Mon merchant family, he studied at Rangoon College, where he passed the FA examination in 1901. He later started a Bachelor of Arts course but left his studies and entered commercial work.

== Career ==
After moving to Rangoon (Yangon), U Thwin worked in the rice trade, which was an important part of the colonial economy and was largely dominated by foreign merchants at the time. He later expanded his business activities and established a rice mill. His experience in the trade made him a recognised figure among Burmese merchants.

U Thwin was among the figures involved in the formation of the Burma Chamber of Commerce, which later became part of the development of Myanmar's chamber of commerce system.

== Buddhist and community work ==
Alongside his business activities, U Thwin participated in Buddhist and social organisations. He founded the Buddhasasana Nuggaha Association in 1947 and supported Buddhist education and religious activities.

In 1947, U Thwin established the Buddhasasana Nuggaha Association in Rangoon. He donated land on Hermitage Road in Rangoon for a meditation center and supported the work of Mahasi Sayadaw. The center later became known as the Mahasi Meditation Centre. He personally invited Mahasi Sayadaw to lead the centre.

U Thwin also supported the Tipitakadhara examinations, which focused on the study and preservation of the Pali Canon. U Thwin supported the Tipitakadhara examinations, which included monks such as Mingun Sayadaw U Vicittasarabhivamsa, the first monk to pass all three sections of the examination.

== Awards and honours ==
U Thwin received the title of Sir from the British government on 1 January 1941. After independence, he was awarded the Thiri Thudhamma Thingaha title by the Myanmar government in 1950. He also received the Order of the Crown of Thailand from the King of Thailand.
