= The Dagons =

- Origin: Los Angeles, California
- Genres: post-punk, psychedelic,
- Years active: 1999–present
- Members: Karie Jacobson; Drew Kowalski
- Website: thedagons.bandcamp.com

The Dagons mix fuzzy guitars, pounding drums & haunting vocals with dreamy lyrics referencing fairy tales & mythology to create their distinctive sound. They are a two-piece band from Los Angeles, made up of Karie Jacobson (guitar, vocals) and Drew Kowalski (drums).

The Dagons are known for combining different musical styles. They use short song structures similar to punk rock but include sounds from psychedelic music. Their songs often feature loud, distorted guitars and drums, minor-key melodies and soft vocals. Later albums also use distorted electrified sitar, played by The Dagons drummer and producer Drew Kowalski.

Several sources state that the band's name, The Dagons (pronounced Day-gons) is a reference to Dagon, the half-man, half-fish god of the Mediterranean sea. Other sources claim that the band's name is a reference to the being Father Dagon as described by horror-fantasy writer H.P. Lovecraft.

== History ==
The Dagons, formed by Karie Jacobson and Drew Kowalski, began playing shows in the late 1990s. Lorraine Rath joined the band on bass in 1998, and plays on the band's first full-length album The Other Ending (1999, Dead Sea Captain Records).

In 2000, the Dagons again became a two-piece band composed of Jacobson and Kowalski, who are a real-life couple. The two moved to Los Angeles, and released the album Make Us Old (2000, Dead Sea Captain.) Make Us Old was the first Dagons album to be produced by drummer Drew Kowalski.

In 2003, The Dagons released the album Teeth for Pearls (2003, Dead Sea Captain).

The Dagons fourth album, Reverse, was released in 2006 on the Montreal label Blow The Fuse. In 2007 Reverse was re-released in Europe. There are two official videos from The Dagons "Reverse" for the songs In Gingham and It Flies Out. Three more official videos for "Upon The Dull Earth" (2011) have been released, and one from the upcoming album, "Witches' Animals."

"Witches' Animals," The Dagons' sixth album, was released in October 2015.

== Discography ==
=== Witches' Animals (2015) ===
1. "The Spell" – 3:46
2. "Keep Your Secrets" – 2:22
3. "Circe's Island" – 3:03
4. "Down Into The Cave" – 3:35
5. "In The Sea We Will Stay" – 2:55
6. "Three of Cups" – 2:47
7. "By Opal Pools" – 3:14
8. "How You Know" – 2:08
9. "In A Story" – 3:05
10. "Scratching Shadows" – 1:32
11. "Letters In Ashes" – 2:35
12. "Witches' Ball" – 4:18

=== Upon the Dull Earth (2011) ===
1. "Hidden Friends" – 2:37
2. "Rose-Patterned Walls" – 2:54
3. "I Am Not Nice" – 2:29
4. "Blank Alphabet" – 3:00
5. "Ribbons" – 1:09
6. "The Party" – 3:26
7. "Gone" – 2:12
8. "Unreal Marshes" – 4:13
9. "Carnival Wearing Thin" – 1:59
10. "The Bee Ride" – 2:00
11. "Lucky/Unlucky" – 2:59
12. "The Switch" – 1:53
13. "Zero Years" – 2:49
14. "Kassandra" – 2:14
15. "Albatross" – 2:16

=== Reverse (2006, Blow the Fuse, 2007 Griptape) ===
1. "It Flies Out" – 2:16
2. "Not Enough" – 1:47
3. "In Gingham" – 3:19
4. "How To Get Through The Glass" – 2:40
5. "Scylla" – 2:14
6. "Helium" – 1:45
7. "The Fifth One" – 3:42
8. "Reverse" – 2:04
9. "Planchettes Half-Apes" – 1:43
10. "Panic In The Snakehouse" – 2:14
11. "Pinafore" – 2:16

Teeth for Pearls (2003, Dead Sea Captain)===

1. "Heaven Wasn't In The Sky" – 2:14
2. "Drill" – 3:10
3. "On This Bed Forever" – 2:34
4. "Dell of Ferns" – 3:06
5. "You Kill The Dream" – 1:59
6. "Urdoguzes" – 3:02
7. "Done" – 2:13
8. "Turnstile" – 2:12
9. "Teeth for Pearls" – 2:52
10. "Queen To Bathe" – 2:38
11. "Water" – 2:35
12. "Tell It To Be Quiet" – 1:50
13. "Count Back" – 1:44
14. "I Don't Want To Play In Your Yard" (Karn and Boyd Jacobson) – 1:30

=== Make Us Old (2000, Dead Sea Captain) ===
1. "Grinder" – 2:10
2. "Las Sirenas" – 2:47
3. "If You Kiss Me" – 1:59
4. "Poison Comb" – 2:11
5. "Air" – 4:51
6. "He Went Into Space" – 2:36
7. "As Close As You May Ever Get" – 2:28
8. "Make Us Old" – 2:57
9. "The Curse" – 2:04
10. "Sleep In Perfume" – 4:13

=== The Other Ending (1999) ===
1. "Changeling" – 3:12
2. "Breathstealer" – 1:37
3. "The Last Thing You'll Ever Feel" – 3:37
4. "Julia Pastrana" – 3:12
5. "Oregon Bloodbath" – 1:46
6. "Skinless Jim" – 2:13
7. "Bulgarian Wolf" – 1:43
8. "Ceiling Floor" – 3:04
9. "Amaroq" – 4:23

=== Compilations ===
- Unquiet Grave, The Ultimate Goth Collection] (Sept.2008, Cleopatra Records)
- Abus Dangereux compilation (Abus Dangereux)
- "M For Montreal" M For Montreal
- Unquiet Grave Vol. 4 (2004, Cleopatra Records)
- 1999 "San Francisco 1999" - Revenge Records

=== Film and TV ===
- The House of Seven Gables (2018, Ben Wickey)
- FML (2016, Avalon Television)
- Awkward. (2012, MTV -Season 2 Episode 9)
- Degrassi (2011, Season 11 Episode 13)
- Roman (2007, Echo Bridge Entertainment, starring Kristen Bell, Lucky McKee, dir. Angela Bettis)
- When is Tomorrow (2007, Mo-Freek, starring Eddie Steeples)
