= Take Your Time (Scatman John album) =

Studio album by Scatman John
- Released: June 1, 1999
- Recorded: 1998–1999
- Genres: Pop; Eurodance; Latin pop; downtempo
- Length: 42:28; 56:48 (Japanese release)
- Label: RCA
- Producer: Scatman John

Scatman John chronology
Everybody Jam! (1996)	Take Your Time (1999)	Listen to the Scatman (2001)

Take Your Time is the fourth and final studio album released by Scatman John during his lifetime. It was released on June 1, 1999, six months before his death; although he suffered from lung cancer through most of the recording, he still managed to record and release his last album.

The album had four singles released from it. "Scatmambo" which was used in the German film Love Scenes from Planet Earth. Japan got a double A side single, "The Chickadee Song" b/w "Take Your Time". Take Your Time was issued in European countries, first with a six track release then a four track release, with a memorial caption on the cover after his death. "Ichi Ni San.... Go!" was also released as a three track single in Europe, proving popular in Germany. The Japanese release includes three bonus tracks.

== Album history ==
His third album "Take Your Time", produced by Kai Matthiesen (producer of Mr. President, B-Charme, Crispy), was released on June 1, 1999. Scatman John died of lung cancer on 3 December 1999 at his home in California, six months after this album's release, ultimately making it his last. There were no music videos made for any of the tracks on this album, owing to John's deteriorating health. "Take Your Time" was released as a six-track CD-single. "Ichi Ni San...Go" was released as the follow-up.

In Japan, "The Chickadee Song" was released as a double-A-side single. It featured the album version and remix of The Chickadee Song and the album version and 2 remix versions of "Take Your Time". After John's death, the "Take Your Time" single was re-released. It had 4 tracks and a banner on the cover which mentioned "In Loving Memory Of John Larkin, alias Scatman John".

== Track listing ==
No.	Title	Writer(s)	Length
1.	"Take Your Time"	John Larkin, Aron Strobel	3:46
2.	"Scatman's Dance"	John Larkin, Robin Masters	3:24
3.	"The Chickadee Song"	Toby Gad, John Larkin, Jacqueline Nemorin	3:21
4.	"Take Me Away"	John Larkin, Robin Masters	3:52
5.	"Scat Me If You Can"	Rainer Gaffrey, John Larkin	3:58
6.	"I Love Samba"	Alexander Benckendorff, John Larkin, Mike Varney	3:42
7.	"Sorry Seems to Be the Hardest Word"	Elton John, Bernie Taupin	4:56
8.	"Ichi Ni San... Go! "(One two three... go!)"	John Larkin, Kai Matthiesen	4:14
9.	"Dream Again"	John Larkin	3:53
10.	"Everyday"	Rainer Gaffrey, John Larkin	3:41
11.	"Night Train"	John Larkin, Caren Müller	3:16
12.	"Scatmambo"	John Larkin	3:08
Total length:			42:28
