= Hanoch Dagan =

Israeli lawyer

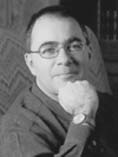

Academic background
- Education: Professor of Law

Hanoch Dagan (Hebrew: חנוך דגן) is an Israeli lawyer and Professor of Law at University of California, Berkeley Law School. He is the founding director of the Berkeley Center for Private Law Theory. He is also Stewart and Judy Colton Professor of Legal Theory at Tel Aviv University and formerly the Justin D'Atri Visiting Professor at Columbia Law School.

== Education ==
Dagan later pursued advanced studies in law and economics, completing his PhD. His academic interests and research have long been centered around the relationship between legal principles and economic analysis.

== Career ==
Dagan began his academic career as a faculty member at Tel Aviv University, where he later became a full professor at the Faculty of Law. His research focuses on the intersection of law and economics, contract theory, and the ethical implications of legal frameworks. Dagan has written extensively on topics related to property law, contract law, and the philosophical foundations of law.

In addition to his academic work, Dagan has taught and mentored numerous law students and legal professionals, contributing significantly to the development of legal scholarship in Israel. He is also known for his involvement in various international academic collaborations and has lectured at conferences around the world.

== Research and publications ==
Dagan has published numerous academic articles and books in his field. One of his key works involves the analysis of property rights and the role they play in economic systems. He has contributed to the development of a legal framework that integrates economic efficiency with ethical considerations in contract and property law. Dagan's work has been widely cited by other scholars in the fields of law, economics, and philosophy.
