= Dog-Gone Sauce =

Hot sauce company

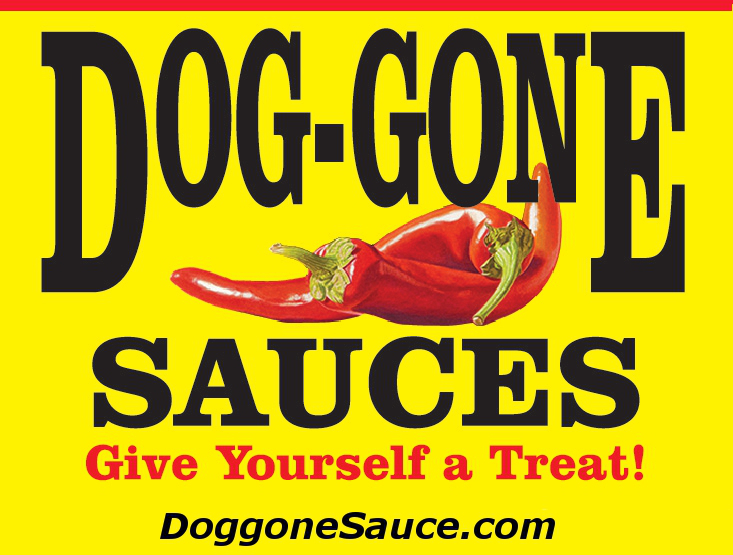
Dog-gone Sauce Logo

Dog-Gone Sauce is a gourmet hot sauce company in Fort Myers, Florida, that was created to donate proceeds to local and national Animal Shelters and several local Humane Societies.

== History ==
Dog-Gone Sauce Company was created by Jeff Schmidt. Schmidt used his experience in the supermarket industry and involvement in a hot sauce company with a friend to create the company, intending to donate the profits to animal shelters. He first began with two sauces, Smoky Sweet BBQ Sauce and Chipotle Hot Sauce and later added two additional sauces, Pineapple Honey Hot Sauce and Honey Rum Hot Sauce.

The labels on the bottles of Dog-Gone Sauce state that "Dog-gone Sauce will donate 100% of the after tax profits. Every animal deserves a loving home."

== Sauce ==
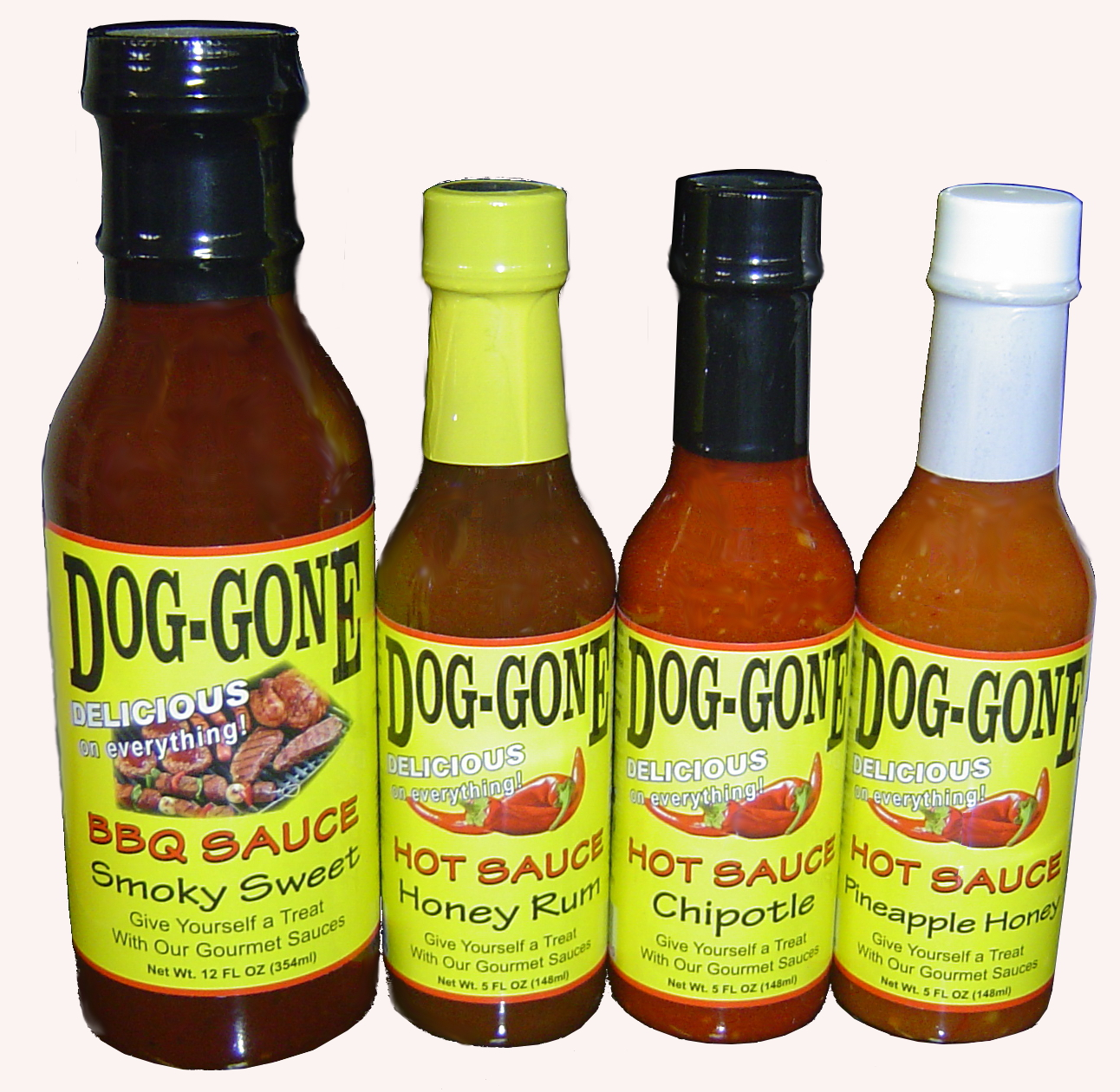
Dog-gone Sauce Bottles

The following varieties of Dog-Gone Sauce are produced:

- Honey Rum Hot Sauce
- Chipotle Hot Sauce
- Pineapple Honey Hot Sauce
- Smoky Sweet BBQ Sauce
