= Dagon International =

Burmese conglomerate

- Company type: Conglomerate
- Industry: Construction, Import-Export, Agriculture
- Founded: 1990s
- Founder: Dagon Win Aung; Win Thein
- Headquarters: Sanchaung Township, Yangon, Myanmar (Burma)
- Key people: Dagon Win Aung, CEO; Moe Mya Mya, Managing Director; Ei Hnin Pwint (Christabelle Aung); Thurane Aung (Christopher Aung); Ei Hnin Khin (Christina Aung)
- Subsidiaries: Dagon Timber Limited
- Website: dagon-group.com

Dagon International Limited (Burmese: ဒဂုံအင်တာနေရှင်နယ်ကုမ္ပဏီ) is a major Burmese conglomerate with interests in construction, timber extraction, agriculture and import-export. The company was founded by Dagon Win Aung and Win Thein in the early 1990s.

From 2009 to 2015, Dagon International and its chief executive officer Win Aung were placed on the American sanctions list since 2009, for its close ties with the Burmese military.

== Management ==
Dagon International is headed by Dagon Win Aung. His wife, Moe Mya Mya (also known as Yew Hoon See) serves as the company's managing director. Their children Ei Hnin Pwint (Christabelle Aung), Thurane Aung (Christopher Aung) and Ei Hnin Khin (Christina Aung) also serve as company directors.

== Projects ==
Dagon International's real estate portfolio includes:

- Dagon Centre
- Dagon Centre II
- Grand Golden View Condominiums
- Palm Beach Resort, Ngwesaung Beach
- The Oasis Hotel (Nay Pyi Taw)
- Thurein Yeik Mon Housing Development

In 2003, the company opened a major retail shopping centre, Dagon Centre at the Myaynigone junction in Yangon's Sanchaung Township. In December 2011, it opened Dagon Centre II, a six story shopping complex containing 60 shops and a theater.

The company also upgraded and extended the national highway from Rangoon to Mandalay.

== Military ties ==
Through the Dagon Win Aung's ties to the military, the company gained exclusive logging rights to harvest timber from Myanmar's protected forest reserves.
