= Everybody Jam! (song) =

Single by Scatman John

from the album Everybody Jam!
- Released: October 30, 1996
- Recorded: 1996
- Genre: Eurodance; jazz rap; pop; electro swing
- Length: 3:31 (Single Jam); 5:21 (Maxi Jam)
- Label: RCA
- Songwriters: Antonio Nunzio Catania; John Larkin
- Producer: Scatman John

Scatman John singles chronology
"Pripri Scat" (1996)	"Everybody Jam!" (1996)	"Let It Go" (1997)

Music video
- "Everybody Jam!" on YouTube

"Everybody Jam!" is a song by Scatman John, released in October 1996, by RCA Records, as a single from the album of the same name (1996). It is a tribute to the music of Louis Armstrong with samples of his voice edited into the track as if in conversation with the Scatman. Also included is a trumpet solo sampled from Armstrong's version of Skokiaan. The song charted at number-one in the Czech Republic and number 46 in Germany. The accompanying music video was directed by Hannes Rossacher.

== Critical reception ==
Larry Flick from Billboard magazine described the song as a "amusing and charming dance ditty". He added that "This time, John's flashy vocal skills are put to the test over a galloping disco groove that is laced with big-band horns and swaggering male background chants."

== Music video ==
The music video for "Everybody Jam!" was directed by Austrian film director and film producer Hannes Rossacher and produced by DoRo Film GmbH. The video was filmed on location in New Orleans, the US and cost around $500,000 US. According to Scatman John, "the day we shot the video was a day beyond all boundaries of time and space. Full of magic. All of the images together created the perfect atmosphere for showing the heart and soul of Louis Armstrong's roots". John's nephew Steve appears in the video. "Everybody Jam!" was later published on Scatman John's official YouTube channel in 2014 and had generated more than 4.1 million views as of early 2026 on the platform.

=== Synopsis ===
In the video, Scatman John, walking across a parking lot, sees the ghost of Louis Armstrong on the side of a building and accepts his invitation to duet. The bulk of the video takes place in a Louisiana street parade with Scatman and Louis riding along behind a marching band in a Cadillac. Several children dressed up like Scatman are seen in the procession whilst onlookers wave Scatman and Louis flags. The video ends with Scatman looking up at Louis in the parking lot where it started. An alternate version of the music video was released with some parts of the video replaced with different scenes.

== Single track listing ==
- CD
1. "Everybody Jam!" [Single Jam] (3:29)
2. "Everybody Jam!" [Maxi Jam] (5:21)
3. "Everybody Jam!" [Club Jam] (5:40)
4. "Scatmusic" (3:55)
- 12"
1. "Everybody Jam!" [DJ Errik's Commercial Charleston Club Mix] (5:42)
2. "Everybody Jam!" [DJ Errik's Nothing Like a Poison Jam Mix] (5:50)

== Charts ==
=== Weekly charts ===
Chart (1996)	Peak position
Belgium (Ultratip Bubbling Under Flanders)	3
Belgium (VRT Top 30 Flanders)	53
Czech Republic (IFPI CR)	1
Europe (Border Breakers Airplay)	2
Europe (European Hit Radio)	30
Germany (GfK)	46
Hungary Airplay (HCRA) (Note: Music & Media published no issues in the four weeks following "Everybody Jam!"'s debut on the Hungarian Airplay chart at number ten, 21 December 1996.)	10
Latvia (Latvijas Top 50)	16
Poland Airplay (Music & Media)	7
US Hot Dance Club Play (Billboard)	44

=== Year-end charts ===
Chart (1996)	Position
Latvia (Latvijas Top 50)	161
