= Ori Dagan =

Canadian singer-songwriter (born 1981)

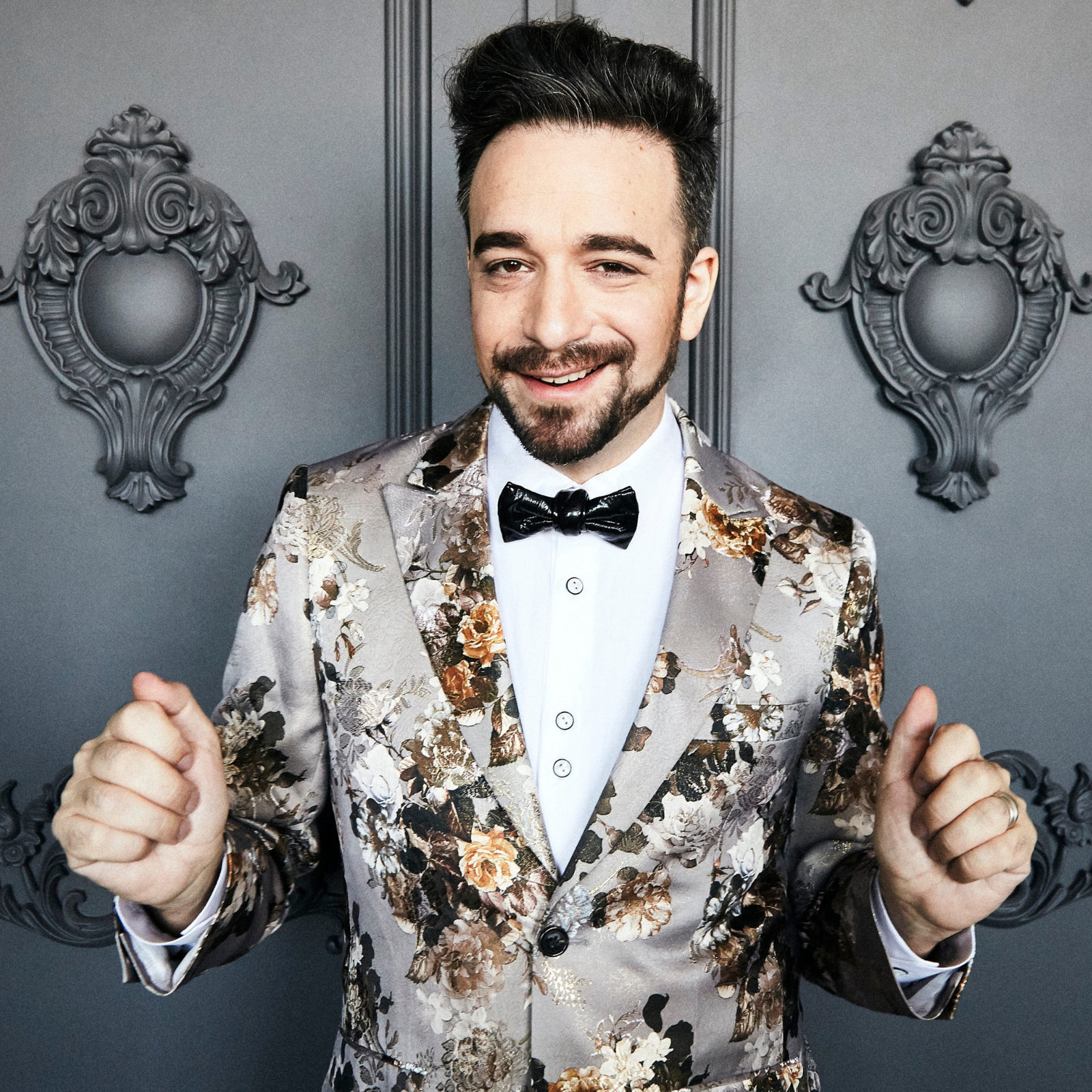

Background information
- Born: 8 June 1981 (age 45); Haifa, Israel
- Genres: Jazz, Singer Songwriter
- Occupation: Singer Songwriter
- Years active: 2000-Present
- Website: https://www.oridagan.com/

Ori Dagan (born June 8, 1981) is a jazz singer-songwriter based in Toronto, Canada. He has released four studio albums, including "Click Right Here" (2022), which marked his European debut at the Skopje Summer Festival in Macedonia. The album received positive reviews for its blend of contemporary lyrics and traditional jazz instrumentation. Additionally, Dagan's collaboration with rapper Erik Flow on the song "Viruses" earned him the Grand Prize from the Great American Song Contest. Over the years, Dagan has released a total of eighteen music videos, including twelve videos accompanying Nathaniel: A Tribute to Nat King Cole, as well as "Googleable" (2012), "Bad Romance" (2012), and "Clap on the 2 and the 4" (2016). Dagan has showcased his talents at various festivals and events worldwide, such as SXSW, TD Toronto Jazz Festival, Canadian Music Week, Jazz Sudbury Festival and TanJazz.

== Early life ==
Born in Haifa, Israel, Dagan grew up playing classical piano. He moved to Toronto with his family at the age of eight. When he gave up classical piano at age sixteen, Dagan turned to writing poetry before Ella Fitzgerald’s scat solos inspired him to pursue jazz. He began his singing career by performing at jam sessions around Toronto around 2000, including sessions at The Rex Hotel, The Poor Alex Theatre and regularly at Lisa Particelli’s Girls Night Out jazz jam.

== Education ==
Dagan’s first mentor in jazz was saxophonist Bob Mover, with whom he spent several years studying privately. In 2002, after two years of studying English Literature at the University of Toronto, he pursued a BFA at York University, studying jazz vocals and classical voice, graduating in 2007. Dagan furthered his musical education by spending two additional years studying songwriting and performance at Humber College’s music program.

== Musical collaborations ==
Dagan’s debut album, S’Cat Got My Tongue, showcased the talent of 15 musicians, including duets with Toronto-based vocalists Heather Bambrick, Terra Hazelton, Julie Michels, and Sophia Perlman. His sophomore album, Less Than Three <3, featured guest appearances by multi-instrumentalist Jane Bunnett and the Eric St-Laurent Trio. Nathaniel: A Tribute to Nat King Cole features Bunnett, as well as duets with Alex Pangman and Sheila Jordan. Dagan collaborated with JUNO-winning Canadian Dance Vocalist Simone Denny to record a jazz rendition of The Buggles' classic, "Video Killed the Radio Star", which serves as a bonus track on his 2022 album Click Right Here.

== Discography ==
=== Album ===
- S'Cat Got My Tongue (ScatCat Records, 2009)
- Less Than Three <3 (ScatCat Records, 2012)
- Nathaniel: A Tribute to Nat King Cole (ScatCat Records, 2017)
- Click Right Here (ScatCat Records, 2022)

=== Singles ===
- "The Christmas Song" (duet with Renee Yoxon) (Scatcat Records, 2015)
- "Clap on the Two and the Four" (ScatCat Records, 2016)
- "Video Killed the Radio Star" (with Simone Denny) (ScatCat Records, 2021)

=== Awards ===
- 2010- CBC Radio 1- Canada's Next Top Crooner
- 2013- NOW Magazine Readers' Poll- Best Male Vocalist
- 2013- Australian Independent Music Video Awards- Best Independent Music Video for "Googleable"
- 2013- Australian Independent Music Video Awards- Best Independent Music Video – Jazz for "Googleable"
- 2014- NOW Magazine Readers' Poll- Best Male Vocalist- Runner-Up
- 2015- Toronto Independent Music Awards- Best Jazz Vocals
- 2015- Hollywood Songwriting Contest- Best Children's Song for "Clap on the 2 and the 4"
- 2016- New York City Jazz Film Festival- Best Educational Jazz Short for "Clap on the 2 and the 4"
- 2016- Polish International Film Festival- Best Jazz Song for "Clap on the 2 and the 4"
- 2016- Global Music Awards- Best Male Vocalist for "Clap on the 2 and the 4"- Bronze Medal winner
- 2017- Global Music Awards- Best Album for Nathaniel: A Tribute to Nat King Cole- Silver Medal winner
- 2017- Open World Toronto Film Festival- Best Music Video for "Sting of the Cactus"
- 2017- Nevada Film Festival- Platinum Reel Award for "Sting of the Cactus"
- 2018- The American Songwriting Award- Best Jazz Song for " Sweetheart"
- 2018- LA Music Video Awards- Best Animation Music Video for " Sting of the Cactus"
- 2018- Rincón International Film Festival- Best Music Video for "Sting of the Cactus"
- 2018- Honolulu Film Awards- Silver Lei for Music Video for "Sting of the Cactus"
- 2018- South Georgian Bay Film Festival- Silver Award Best Music Video for "Sting of the Cactus"
- 2018- WorldFest-Houston International Film & Video Festival- Silver Remi Award for Best Jazz Music Video for "Sting of the Cactus
- 2018- Canadian Diversity Film Festival- Best Music Video for "Sweetheart"
- 2018- Colorado International Activism Film Festival- Best Actor/Singer for a Non-Animated Short/Music Video for "Complexion"
- 2021- NOW Magazine Readers Best Local Artist Or Group
- 2022- The Great American Song Contest Winner "Best Special Category Music"
