= Dagan, Iran =

Dagan دگن
- Village
- Location within Iran
- Coordinates: 35°04′46″N 47°15′54″E
- Country: Iran
- Province: Kurdistan
- County: Kamyaran
- Bakhsh: Muchesh
- Rural District: Amirabad

Population (2006)
  - Total: 207
- Time zone: UTC+3:30 (IRST)
  - Summer (DST): UTC+4:30 (IRDT)

Dagan (Persian: دگن, also Romanized as Dagen; also known as Daggin) is a village in Amirabad Rural District, Muchesh District, Kamyaran County, Kurdistan Province, Iran. At the 2006 census, its population was 207, in 47 families. The village is populated by Kurds.
