= Scatman's World =

Studio album by Scatman John
- Released: July 10, 1995
- Recorded: 1994–1995
- Studios: Catania Music (Bottrop, Germany)
- Genres: Pop; Eurodance; house; techno; scat
- Length: 49:20
- Label: RCA
- Producers: Antonio Nunzio Catania; Ingo Kays

Scatman John chronology
John Larkin (1986)	Scatman's World (1995)	Scat Paradise (1995)

Singles from Scatman's World
- 1. "Scatman (Ski-Ba-Bop-Ba-Dop-Bop)" Released: November 30, 1994; 2. "Scatman's World" Released: June 19, 1995; 3. "Song of Scatland" Released: November 13, 1995

Scatman's World is the debut major-label studio album (and second overall) by American musician Scatman John, recorded after the worldwide success of his debut single "Scatman (Ski-Ba-Bop-Ba-Dop-Bop)". It is a loose concept album dealing with an imaginary Utopian society named "Scatland". He speaks about this at length in the liner notes, as well in several tracks on the album, most notably the track "Song of Scatland".

Scatman's World was very popular internationally, particularly in Japan, where it reached No. 2 and stayed on the charts for 40 weeks, selling more than 1,560,000 copies overall, ranking among the top twenty best-selling albums of all time in that country recorded by non-Japanese artists. In the late 2010s and early 2020s, the title track "Scatman's World" saw a resurgence in popularity due to becoming an Internet meme.

== Track listing ==
All tracks are written by John Larkin and Antonio Nunzio Catania.

No.	Title	Length
1.	"Welcome to Scatland"	0:49
2.	"Scatman's World"	3:40
3.	"Only You"	3:42
4.	"Quiet Desperation"	3:51
5.	"Scatman (Ski-Ba-Bop-Ba-Dop-Bop)"	3:30
6.	"Sing Now!"	3:38
7.	"Popstar"	4:13
8.	"Time (Take Your Time)"	3:41
9.	"Mambo Jambo"	3:30
10.	"Everything Changes"	4:38
11.	"Song of Scatland"	5:05
12.	"Hi, Louis"	2:34
13.	"Scatman (Game Over Jazz)"	5:03

In July 2025, to celebrate the album's 30th anniversary, it was reissued on vinyl with "Can You Hear Me", an unreleased track recorded in 1999, several months before Larkin's death, as a bonus track.

== Charts ==
=== Weekly charts ===
Weekly chart performance for Scatman's World
Chart (1995–96)	Peak position
Austrian Albums (Ö3 Austria)	25
Belgian Albums (Ultratop Flanders)	12
Belgian Albums (Ultratop Wallonia)	12
Dutch Albums (Album Top 100)	20
European Albums (Top 100)	8
Finnish Albums (Suomen virallinen lista)	1
French Albums (SNEP)	13
German Albums (Offizielle Top 100)	6
Hungarian Albums (MAHASZ)	1
Japanese Albums (Oricon)	2
Norwegian Albums (VG-lista)	6
Swedish Albums (Sverigetopplistan)	42
Swiss Albums (Schweizer Hitparade)	4

=== Year-end charts ===
1995 year-end chart performance for Scatman's World
Chart (1995)	Position
European Albums (Top 100)	63
French Albums (SNES)	63
German Albums (Offizielle Top 100)	56
Japanese Albums (Oricon)	15
Swiss Albums (Schweizer Hitparade)	16

1996 year-end chart performance for Scatman's World
Chart (1996)	Position
Japanese Albums (Oricon)	47

== Certifications ==
Sales and certifications for Scatman's World
Region	Certification	Certified units/sales
France (SNEP)	Gold	100,000^{*}
Japan (RIAJ)	Million	1,560,000
Poland (ZPAV)	Gold	50,000^{*}
Sweden (GLF)	Gold	50,000^{^}
^{*} Sales figures based on certification alone.^{^} Shipments figures based on certification alone.

== See also ==
- List of best-selling albums in Japan
