= Scatman's World (song) =

Single by Scatman John

from the album Scatman's World
- B-side: "Time (Take Your Time)"
- Released: June 1995
- Genre: Eurodance
- Length: 3:40
- Label: RCA
- Songwriters: Antonio Nunzio Catania; John Larkin
- Producers: Antonio Nunzio Catania; Ingo Kays

Scatman John singles chronology
"Scatman (Ski-Ba-Bop-Ba-Dop-Bop)" (1994)	"Scatman's World" (1995)	"Song of Scatland" (1995)

Music video
- "Scatman's World" on YouTube

"Scatman's World" is a song by American musician Scatman John, released in June 1995 by RCA Records as the second single from his album of the same name (1995). Co-written by John, the song was the follow-up to the international hit "Scatman (Ski Ba Bop Ba Dop Bop)" and reached number-one in Belgium, Finland, France, Germany, Hungary and Spain. Its accompanying music video was directed by Zowie Broach.

== Critical reception ==
In his weekly UK chart commentary for Dotmusic, James Masterton said, "Now he is back with the followup in pretty much the same vein. Without the novelty value of the first hit it will be interesting to see if this manages to top the Number 3 peak of its predecessor."

James Hyman from Music Week's RM Dance Update wrote, "Currently number one in Germany and hitting hard across the rest of Europe, more novelty Euro from a 53-year-old former jazz singer and pianist. Semi-social scat-raps reside over a backing track not too dissimilar from his previous 'Scatman' single as well as Village People's 'Go West'."

Helen Lamont from Smash Hits commented, "It's a happy tune, catchy too. If you listen to the words, however, you'll notice he's trying to teach us something. There's a groovy bit of chorus and then each verse contains a "helpful" lecture, on subjects from the state of humanity to world pollution."

== Chart performance ==
"Scatman's World" was successful on the singles charts in Europe, peaking at number one in Belgium (in both Flanders and Wallonia) (6 and 9 weeks), Finland, France (1 week), Germany (3 weeks), Hungary and Spain. On the Eurochart Hot 100, it became John's second number-one hit in August 1995, after 8 weeks on the chart and with 3 weeks as number one in total.

The single was a top-10 hit in Austria (4), Denmark (3), Iceland (9), Ireland (7), Italy (2), the Netherlands (3), Norway (4), Sweden (10), Switzerland (3), and the UK. In the latter, it peaked at number 10 in its second week at the UK Singles Chart, on September 3, 1995. It stayed for seven weeks within the chart. Outside Europe, "Scatman's World" charted on the RPM Dance/Urban chart in Canada and on the ARIA singles chart in Australia, peaking at numbers 21 and 84.

The single earned a gold record in Belgium (25,000), France (250,000) and Switzerland (25,000). In Germany, it was awarded with a platinum record after 500,000 units were sold.

== Music video ==
The music video for "Scatman's World" was directed by Zowie Broach and produced by Weisz & Friends. "Scatman's World" was A-listed on German music television channel VIVA in July 1995. In August, the video was A-listed on Dutch TMF and received active rotation on MTV Europe. And in September, it was a Box Top on British The Box for 13 weeks.

== Track listings ==
- CD1, Europe
1. "Scatman's World" (single mix) — 3:40
2. "Scatman's World" (club mix) — 5:54
3. "Scatman's World" (house mix) — 5:30
4. "Time (Take Your Time)" — 3:41
- CD2 (Remixes), Europe
1. "Scatman's World" (dance remix) — 5:57
2. "Scatman's World" (DJ Hooligan's Underworld remix) — 6:34
3. "Scatman's World" (Rave remix) — 7:10
4. "Scatman's World" (House-Dub remix) — 5:28
5. "Scatman's World" (Divas 70's mix) — 5:49
6. "Scatman's World" (80's mix) — 6:06
- CD3, Japan
1. "Scatman's World" (single mix) — 3:40
2. "Scatman's World" (club mix) — 5:54
3. "Scatman's World" (house mix) — 5:30
4. "Scatman's World" (80's mix) — 6:08
5. "Scatman's Special Message for Japan Only" — 0:47

== Charts ==
=== Weekly charts ===
Weekly chart performance for "Scatman's World"
Chart (1995)	Peak position
Australia (ARIA)	84
Austria (Ö3 Austria Top 40)	4
Belgium (Ultratop 50 Flanders)	1
Belgium (Ultratop 50 Wallonia)	1
Canada Dance/Urban (RPM)	21
Denmark (IFPI)	3
Europe (Eurochart Hot 100)	1
Europe (European Dance Radio)	8
Europe (European Hit Radio)	5
Finland (Suomen virallinen lista)	1
France (SNEP)	1
Germany (GfK)	1
Hungary (Mahasz)	1
Iceland (Íslenski Listinn Topp 40)	9
Ireland (IRMA)	7
Israel (Israeli Singles Chart)	3
Italy (Musica e dischi)	2
Italy Airplay (Music & Media)	10
Netherlands (Dutch Top 40)	3
Netherlands (Single Top 100)	4
Norway (VG-lista)	4
Quebec (ADISQ)	13
Scotland (OCC)	10
Spain (AFYVE)	1
Sweden (Sverigetopplistan)	10
Switzerland (Schweizer Hitparade)	3
UK Singles (OCC)	10
UK Dance (OCC)	35
UK Pop Tip Club Chart (Music Week)	2

=== Year-end charts ===
1995 year-end chart performance for "Scatman's World"
Chart (1995)	Position
Austria (Ö3 Austria Top 40)	22
Belgium (Ultratop 50 Flanders)	12
Belgium (Ultratop 50 Wallonia)	5
Europe (Eurochart Hot 100)	6
Europe (European Hit Radio)	40
France (SNEP)	8
Germany (Media Control)	11
Israel (Israeli Singles Chart)	20
Latvia (Latvijas Top 50)	4
Netherlands (Dutch Top 40)	31
Netherlands (Single Top 100)	47
Sweden (Topplistan)	81
Switzerland (Schweizer Hitparade)	16
UK Pop Tip Club Chart (Music Week)	38

== Certifications ==
Certifications and sales for "Scatman's World"
Region	Certification	Certified units/sales
Belgium (BRMA)	Gold	25,000^{*}
France (SNEP)	Gold	250,000^{*}
Germany (BVMI)	Platinum	500,000^{^}
Switzerland (IFPI Switzerland)	Gold	25,000^{^}
^{*} Sales figures based on certification alone.^{^} Shipments figures based on certification alone.

== Release history ==
Release dates and formats for "Scatman's World"
Region	Date	Format(s)	Label(s)	Ref.
Europe	June 1995	CD	RCA	
United Kingdom	August 21, 1995	12-inch vinyl; CD; cassette	RCA	
Australia	November 13, 1995	CD; cassette	RCA; BMG; Ariola	
