= Scatman John =

American musician (1942–1999)

- Undated promotional picture of Scatman John

Background information
- Born: John Paul Larkin; March 13, 1942; El Monte, California, U.S.
- Died: December 3, 1999 (aged 57) Los Angeles, California, U.S.
- Genres: Eurodance; pop; jazz; scat; hip-hop
- Occupations: Singer; songwriter; pianist
- Instruments: Vocals; piano
- Years active: 1970s–1999
- Labels: America; RCA; Iceberg; Transition
- Spouse: Judy McHugh Larkin (m. 1994)
- Website: scatmanjohn.com

John Paul Larkin (March 13, 1942 – December 3, 1999), known professionally under the alias Scatman John, was an American musician. A prolific jazz pianist and vocalist for several decades, he rose to prominence in 1994 through his fusion of scat singing and dance music. He recorded five albums, which were released between 1986 and 2001.

In the United States and Europe, Larkin is recognized for his singles "Scatman (Ski-Ba-Bop-Ba-Dop-Bop)" and "Scatman's World". He achieved his greatest success in Japan, where his album Scatman's World (1995) sold more than a million copies. Outside of his musical activities, he had deepened exchanges with stuttering organizations and established the Scatland Foundation in 1996 with the purpose of furthering research of and educating the public on stuttering. Larkin was a recipient of the American Speech–Language–Hearing Association's Annie Glenn Award for outstanding service to the stuttering community and a posthumous inductee to the National Stuttering Association Hall of Fame.

== Early life ==
John Paul Larkin was born on March 13, 1942, at the Stanley Hospital in El Monte, California. He had a prominent stutter by the time he learned to speak. This stutter contributed to his emotionally traumatic childhood. At age twelve, he began to learn the piano and was introduced to the art of scat singing two years later through records by Ella Fitzgerald and Louis Armstrong, among others. The piano provided him with a means of artistic expression to compensate for his speech difference, and he "hid behind [the] piano because [he] was scared to speak."

== Musical career ==
Larkin began making jazz music in the 1970s. His first known performance on a studio album was in 1981 on the album Animal Sounds by Sam Phipps. In 1986, he released the self-titled album John Larkin, on the Transition label, which he co-produced with Marcia Larkin. It featured Joe Farrell on saxophone.

=== "Scatman John" ===
To advance his career in 1990, Larkin moved to Berlin, Germany. Once there, he discovered an appreciative jazz culture and started playing jazz gigs. This was when he first decided to take a monumental step away from his insecurities and add singing to his act for the first time, inspired by a standing ovation he received for a performance at the Cafe Moscow in Berlin. Soon after, his agent Manfred Zähringer from Iceberg Records (Denmark) thought of combining scat singing with modern dance music and hip-hop effects.

Larkin was worried that listeners would realize he stuttered, and his wife, Judy, suggested that he talk about it directly in his music. Working with dance producers composer Tony Catania, and Ingo Kays co producer, he recorded the first single, "Scatman (Ski-Ba-Bop-Ba-Dop-Bop)". After his first big hit, he adopted the new name and persona of "Scatman" John.

In 1995, at age 53, Larkin became a worldwide star. Sales of his debut single were slow at first, but they gradually reached number one in many countries and sold more than six million records worldwide. "Scatman (Ski-Ba-Bop-Ba-Dop-Bop)" charted highly across Europe and Japan and remains his biggest-selling and most well-known song. He later followed up with the song "Scatman's World" entering the UK Singles Chart at number 10, which met lesser but still notable success, selling a million copies and charting highly throughout Europe.

Following the success of these two singles, he released his debut album as Scatman John, also titled Scatman's World, which entered the top 10 album charts in many countries, including his then home Germany as well as in Switzerland, Finland and Norway; the album eventually sold millions of copies worldwide, becoming so popular that a Scatman John design appeared on Coca-Cola cans. He began a promotional and concert tour of Europe and Asia. Referring to a performance in Spain, Larkin said, "the kids screamed for five minutes straight, I couldn't start the song".

The second Scatman John album, Everybody Jam!, was released in 1996. While nowhere near as successful on an international level as his debut, the album and accompanying single took off in Japan, the country in which he would see success on a larger scale than anywhere else in the world. In Europe, subsequent singles failed to replicate the chart success of his first two singles, giving him the title two-hit wonder.

The Japanese version of Everybody Jam! included a total of five bonus tracks, including the hit singles "Su Su Su Super Ki Re i" and "Pripri Scat", which were commissioned by Japanese companies for commercials for cosmetics and pudding, respectively.

The Ultraman franchise even jumped on the Scatman bandwagon, releasing a single titled "Scatultraman", the cover art of which featured the Ultraman characters wearing Scatman's trademark hat and mustache. The album reached No. 45 in Switzerland.

The song "Can You Hear Me" was posthumously released in 2025.

== Illness and death ==
In late 1998, Larkin was diagnosed with lung cancer. In June 1999, he released his fourth and final album as Scatman John, Take Your Time. Shortly afterward, he was sent into intensive treatment. Around that time it was rumored that John had collapsed on stage, which was false, since he had never performed in public after being diagnosed.

Larkin died at home in Los Angeles on December 3, 1999, at the age of 57. He was cremated, and his ashes were scattered at sea off the coast of Malibu, California, two years later.

His widow, who was the granddaughter of composer Jimmy McHugh and entertainer Eddie Cantor, died in 2023.

His stepson owns archives of Larkin: the John Larkin Archives and the Scatman John website.

== Discography ==
- John Larkin (1986)
- John Larkin Sings (1990) (later released as Listen to the Scatman in 2001)
- Scatman's World (1995)
- Everybody Jam! (1996)
- Take Your Time (1999)

== Biographies ==
In 2022, Jeff Chi wrote and illustrated Who's The Scatman?, a graphic novel biography published in German. The comic details Larkin's rise in fame and career, as well as his recovery from drug and alcohol addiction. To gather details about Larkin's life, Chi conducted video chats with those who knew Larkin during his jazz days and Eurodance phase, including John's manager, Manfred Zähringer, the producers of his hit singles and albums, and musicians who knew him during his career.

In March 2023, a biopic on Larkin's life was announced via The Hollywood Reporter. The rights to the life story were given by his estate, and the film is set to feature unparalleled access to the entire Scatman library as well as previously unpublished private home videos.

In September 2024, an authorized biography on Larkin's life written by Gina Waggott was officially announced for a late 2025/early 2026 release, published by Bloomsbury Publishing. More than half of the book contains details about Larkin and his life never previously made public. Titled Scatman John: The Remarkable Story of the World's Unlikeliest Popstar, it was released on February 5, 2026.
