= Scatman (Ski-Ba-Bop-Ba-Dop-Bop) =

1994 single by Scatman John

Single by Scatman John

from the album Scatman's World
- Released: November 30, 1994
- Recorded: September 1994
- Genre: Eurodance*rap
- Length: 5:11 (extended radio); 3:30 (basic radio)
- Label: RCA
- Songwriters: John Larkin; Antonio Nunzio Catania
- Producers: Ingo Kays; Antonio Nunzio Catania

Scatman John singles chronology
"Scatman (Ski-Ba-Bop-Ba-Dop-Bop)" (1994)	"Scatman's World" (1995)

Music video
- "Scatman (Ski-Ba-Bop-Ba-Dop-Bop)" on YouTube

"Scatman (Ski-Ba-Bop-Ba-Dop-Bop)" is a song by American musician Scatman John. It was released in November 1994, by RCA Records, as his debut single, and was later re-released in July 1995 for his second album, Scatman's World (1995). The song was co-written by John and produced by Tony Catania and Ingo Kays. It has been described as "a blend of jazz scatting, rap, and house beats", and reached number-one on the charts in at least ten countries.

"Scatman" peaked at number three on the UK Singles Chart and number 60 on the US Billboard Hot 100. The song won the March 1996 Echo Award in Germany for the best Rock/Pop single. The accompanying music video was directed by Kerstin Mueller. It was shot in black-and-white and received heavy rotation on music channels.

== Background and release ==
Born in El Monte, California, Scatman John (a.k.a. John Paul Larkin) stuttered from the time he learned to speak, which led to an emotionally traumatic childhood. At age twelve, he began to learn piano and was introduced to the art of scat singing two years later, through records by Ella Fitzgerald and Louis Armstrong, among others. Larkin became a professional jazz pianist in the 1970s and 1980s, playing many engagements in jazz clubs around Los Angeles.

His first known performance on a studio album was in 1981 on the album Animal Sounds by Sam Phipps. In 1986, he released the self titled album John Larkin on the Transition label. This album was produced by John himself, along with Marcia Larkin.

"In my opinion that song has a really strong message, I and John Larkin wrote the lyrics for old and young generation. Also, I think the track will go on to be an evergreen, because it's so catchy and original. On top of that, with old man singing dance music was not typical for the scene. I think this is such a positive song, that encourages people to do something out of their life and the message is AGE DOESN'T MATTER."

— Producer Tony Catania talking about the song.

To advance his career in 1990, Larkin moved to Berlin, Germany. From there, he discovered the appreciative jazz culture and started playing jazz gigs. This was when he first decided to take a monumental step away from his insecurities and add singing to his act for the first time. His agent Manfred Zähringer from Iceberg Records (Denmark) thought of combining scat singing with modern dance music and hip hop effects. Larkin was resistant at first, terrified of being laughed at and criticized once again, but BMG Hamburg was open. Larkin was worried that listeners would realise he stuttered, and his wife, Judy, suggested that he talk about it directly in his music.

Producer Tony Catania then received a VHS from Zähringer. On the tape, he observed Larkin playing piano songs from Fitzgerald, Armstrong etc. He said in an interview, "The sound was a little crazy but at the end of this tape, I remember it like yesterday, he starts his scat singing improvisation. I was thinking at the moment that this is a great idea. I say to his management to bring John Larkin from L.A. to my studio and in this moment, Scatman John was born!!!".

In two days, working with producers Ingo Kays and Catania, the new single, "Scatman (Ski-Ba-Bop-Ba-Dop-Bop)" was created. Catania added, "Those days, the sounds were always the same, and I was coming up with an old jazz guy that had the talent to scat, something like that would shock the scene. I was right, Scatman John was a huge success worldwide." After the success of his first single, Larkin adopted the new name and persona of "Scatman" John.

Some lyrics from the song are reused from "The Misfit", a song from Larkin's 1986 debut album John Larkin.

== Composition ==
"Scatman (Ski-Ba-Bop-Ba-Dop-Bop)" is a novelty synthpop dance song with a quirky Euro-NRG tone. As critics summarized, the lyrics contain portions of spoken word, rapping, and a "jaunty ragga" style of scatting, where Scatman John "bends his tongue to rapid, ear-popping effect". This is driven by the "hellacious" techno groove of its extremely-fast, pitter-pattering chintzy drum machine.

== Reception ==
Mark Frith from Smash Hits, in a 5/5 "Best New Single" review, called "Scatman" "infectious, fun, loud, meaningless and stupid that you can't resist", despite all the factors of a novelty single working against it, such as its cheesiness as meaningless lyrics.

The song's top-three success was predicted by UK chart commentator James Masterton. According to Pieter Kops, the song's "sheer novelty allure, evoked by its mixture of traditional scat and contemporary dance idioms", was the reason for its huge success in Europe. "Scatman (Ski-Ba-Bop-Ba-Dop-Bop)" topped the Eurochart Hot 100, the sales chart for the continent, on the week of April 15, 1995. It broke the consecutive seven-week run at number one of "Here Comes the Hotstepper" by Ini Kamoze, fueled by the top-five performance of seven European sales charts. This led Music & Media chart commentator Mark Sperwer to declare, "the 53-year-old jazz vocalist proves that 'hot to trot' applies to any age group." With over two million copies, it was the second highest-selling single of 1995 in Europe, only below "You Are Not Alone" by Michael Jackson.

With "Scatman" and the follow-up single "Scatman's World", the artist took the top-two spots of the 1995 year-end for the European Border Breakers chart, which measures the radio performance of songs within Europe outside each artist's country of signing. While the artist was American, he signed to the Iceberg label in Denmark, making him eligible. "Scatman" spent the most weeks of any song on the chart's first two years of existence up to 1995, with Ace of Base's "Lucky Love" (ten weeks) and "Scatman's World" (nine weeks) close behind. Scatman John also spent the highest amount of weeks at the top spot of any artist in 1995 (20 weeks), his presence adding to the 31 weeks Danish-released songs were at number one that year (the most of any nation); the Mega-signed Ace of Base was there for 11 weeks.

In the US, the single charted on the Billboard Hot 100 and Hot Dance Club Play charts and the Cash Box Top 100, peaking at numbers 60, 10 and 62, respectively. Sales was the primary driver for its chart run, as it reached number 47 on the Hot 100 Single Sales chart (the same week as its peak on the main chart), while failing to enter the Hot 100 Airplay chart. Scatman John was awarded the March 1996 Echo Award in Germany for the best Rock/Pop single with "Scatman".

== Music video ==
The music video for "Scatman" was released in 1994 and directed by Kerstin Mueller and produced by Ariola Records. It was shot in black and white, and features a fractured screen with several box shots, almost in the style of Cubism, showing John singing, along with people dancing, miming, lip-syncing and playing the drums, bass and trumpet. The video was played in heavy rotation on music channels in 1995. It was A-listed on Germany's VIVA in March, received heavy rotation on MTV Europe in April and was A-listed on France's MCM in May. In the UK, it was a Box Top on The Box for 20 weeks from April to August that year. "Scatman" was nominated for two awards in the category for Dance at the 1995 Billboard Music Video Awards; Best Clip and Best New Artist Clip. In 2013, the video was made available on Scatman John's official YouTube channel, having generated more than 267 million views as of late 2025.

== Legacy ==
The success of "Scatman" and "Scatman's World" earned Scatman John an award at the 1996 Dance d'Or Awards in France. In 2013, Vibe ranked "Scatman" number 28 in their list of "Before EDM: 30 Dance Tracks from the '90s That Changed the Game". In 2017, BuzzFeed ranked it number 94 in their "The 101 Greatest Dance Songs of the '90s". In 2024, MTV 90s ranked "Scatman" number seven in their list of "Top 50 Rhythms of Eurodance". In 2025, the song's music video was heavily featured in the first episode of the Japanese anime series Wandance.

== Sampling ==
In 2021, music producers Alan Walker and Imanbek sampled the song and additionally used wording from the title of the song in their hit "Sweet Dreams". It is sampled in the 2022 song "Bailar Contigo" by Black Eyed Peas and Daddy Yankee.

== Track listings ==
- 12" single
1. "Scatman" (Pech Remix) – 4:53
2. "Scatman" (Second Level Remix) – 5:41
3. "Scatman" (Arena Di Verona Mix) – 5:59
4. "Scatman" (Extended Radio Mix) – 5:06
- CD single
1. "Scatman" (Basic Radio) – 3:30
2. "Scatman" (Pech Remix) – 4:55
3. "Scatman" (Arena Di Verona Mix) – 6:04
4. "Scatman" (Third Level) – 5:46
- CD maxi
1. "Scatman" (Basic Radio) – 3:30
2. "Scatman" (Jazz Level) – 3:41
3. "Scatman" (Second Level) – 5:40
4. "Scatman" (Third Level) – 5:46
5. "Scatman" (Game Over Jazz) – 5:03
- CD maxi 2
1. "Scatman" (New Radio Edit) – 3:21
2. "Scatman" (Pech Remix) – 4:55
3. "Scatman" (Arena Di Verona Mix) – 6:04
4. "Scatman" (Extended Radio Version) – 5:11

== Charts ==
=== Weekly charts ===
Weekly chart performance
Chart (1995)	Peak position
Australia (ARIA)	8
Austria (Ö3 Austria Top 40)	1
Belgium (Ultratop 50 Flanders)	1
Belgium (Ultratop 50 Wallonia)	1
Canada Top Singles (RPM)	84
Canada Dance/Urban (RPM)	1
Denmark (Tracklisten)	1
El Salvador (UPI)	6
Europe (Eurochart Hot 100)	1
Europe (European Dance Radio)	2
Europe (European Hit Radio)	5
Finland (Suomen virallinen lista)	1
France (SNEP)	1
Germany (Media Control Charts)	2
Greece (Pop + Rock)	1
Iceland (Íslenski Listinn Topp 40)	20
Ireland (IRMA)	1
Israel (Israeli Singles Chart)	3
Italy (Musica e dischi)	3
Italy Airplay (Music & Media)	6
Japan (Oricon)	36
Mexico (Notitas Musicales)	3
Netherlands (Dutch Top 40)	2
Netherlands (Single Top 100)	2
New Zealand (RIANZ)	39
Norway (VG-lista)	1
Quebec (ADISQ)	16
Scotland (OCC)	3
Spain (AFYVE)	1
Sweden (Sverigetopplistan)	2
Switzerland (Schweizer Hitparade)	1
UK Singles (OCC)	3
UK Dance (OCC)	9
UK Airplay (Music Week)	17
UK Pop Tip Club Chart (Music Week)	3
US Billboard Hot 100	60
US Hot Dance Club Play (Billboard)	10
US Hot Dance Music/Maxi-Singles Sales (Billboard)	15
US Rhythmic Top 40 (Billboard)	40
US Top 40 Mainstream (Billboard)	40
US Cash Box Top 100	62

=== Year-end charts ===
Annual chart rankings
Chart (1995)	Position
Australia (ARIA)	38
Austria (Ö3 Austria Top 40)	8
Belgium (Ultratop 50 Flanders)	7
Belgium (Ultratop 50 Wallonia)	3
Brazil (Crowley)	93
Canada Dance/Urban (RPM)	1
Europe (Eurochart Hot 100)	2
Europe (Border Breakers)	1
Europe (European Hit Radio)	22
France (SNEP)	3
Germany (Media Control)	5
Israel (Israeli Singles Chart)	5
Latvia (Latvijas Top 50)	25
Netherlands (Dutch Top 40)	11
Netherlands (Single Top 100)	23
Norway (VG-lista) (Winter Period)	7
Sweden (Topplistan)	23
Switzerland (Schweizer Hitparade)	4
UK Singles (OCC)	30
UK Pop Tip Club Chart (Music Week)	21

== Certifications ==
Certifications and sales for "Scatman (Ski-Ba-Bop-Ba-Dop-Bop)"
Region	Certification	Certified units/sales
Australia (ARIA)	Gold	35,000^{^}
Austria (IFPI Austria)	Gold	25,000^{*}
Belgium (BRMA)	Platinum	50,000^{*}
France (SNEP)	Platinum	500,000^{*}
Germany (BVMI)	Platinum	500,000^{^}
Italy (FIMI) sales since 2009	Gold	50,000^{‡}
New Zealand (RMNZ)	Gold	15,000^{‡}
Norway (IFPI Norway)	Gold	
Switzerland (IFPI Switzerland)	Gold	25,000^{^}
United Kingdom (BPI)	Gold	400,000^{‡}
^{*} Sales figures based on certification alone.^{^} Shipments figures based on certification alone.^{‡} Sales+streaming figures based on certification alone.

== Release history ==
Street dates for "Scatman (Ski-Ba-Bop-Ba-Dop-Bop)"
Region	Date	Format(s)	Label(s)	Ref.
Europe	November 30, 1994	CD	RCA	
United Kingdom	May 1995	—N/a	RCA	
United States	July 18, 1995	Rhythmic contemporary radio	RCA	
Japan	August 2, 1995	CD	RCA	
