= Cole Porter discography =

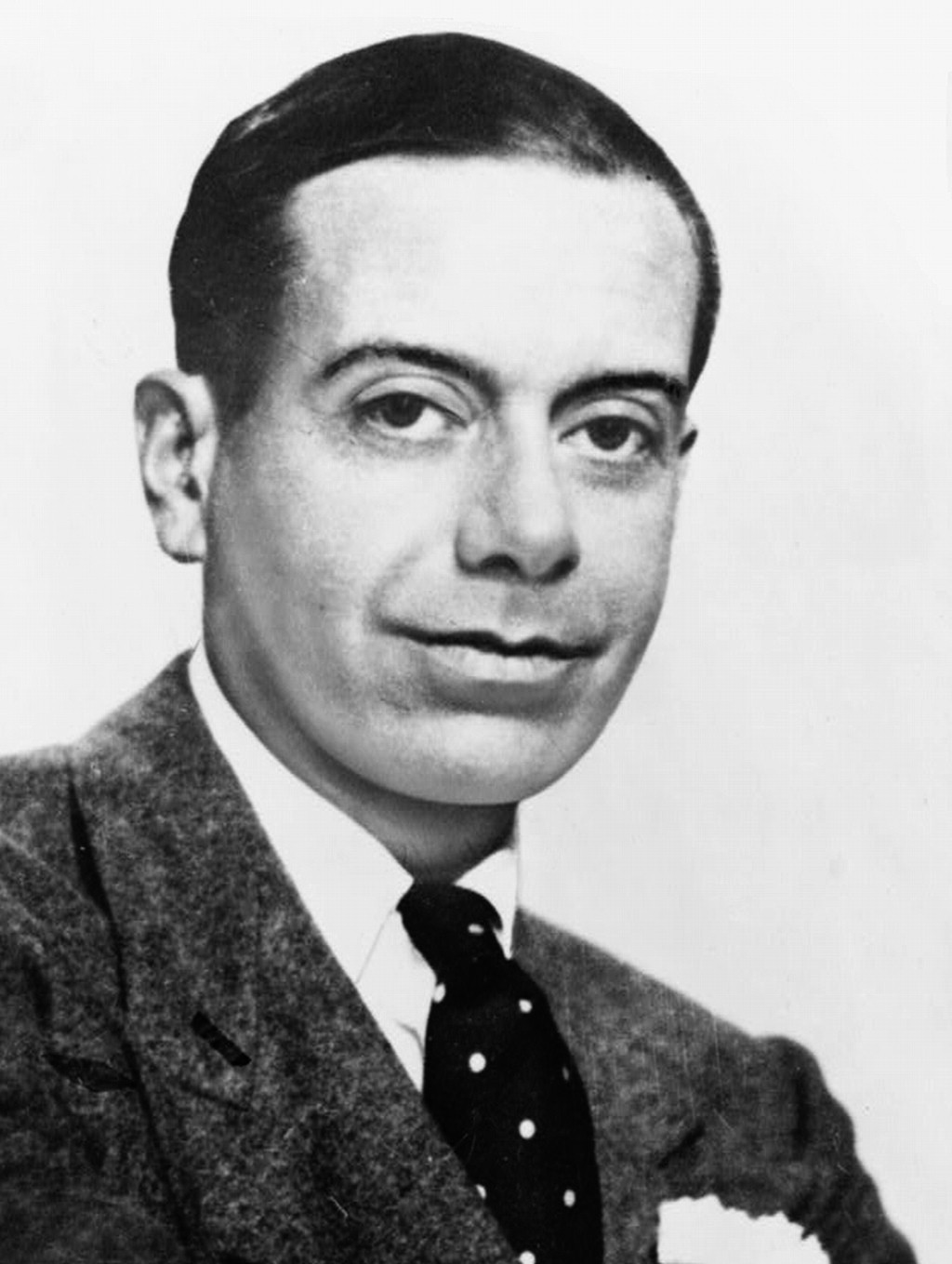
Porter in the 1930s

Cole Porter (1891–1964) was an American composer and songwriter who, from the 1920s to the 1950s, wrote songs, musicals and film scores. Many of his songs became standards noted for their witty, urbane lyrics, and many of his scores found success on Broadway and in Hollywood films. His most successful songs include "Night and Day", "Begin the Beguine", "I Get a Kick Out of You", "Well, Did You Evah!", "I've Got You Under My Skin", "Let's Do It, Let's Fall in Love", "My Heart Belongs to Daddy" and "You're the Top". His musicals include Anything Goes and Kiss Me, Kate.

Many hundreds of recordings have been made of Cole Porter's works.

== Selected discography ==
This discography provides a compact survey of these works. Many other recordings not listed are covered in The Cole Porter Reference Guide. A listing of Porter's 78-rpm recordings is at the Discography of American Historical Recordings (up to 1956). The recordings are sorted by year of the original release of the work, but the dates shown refer to release dates of the most accessible versions, usually CD releases.

=== Stage musicals and films ===
A single recording is listed for each work: its original cast recording or soundtrack, or, where no reasonably complete contemporary recording exists, a faithful later production.

- Orchestra New England (1991). Fifty Million Frenchmen (CD). US: New World 80417-2.
- Encores! (2017). The New Yorkers (CD). US: Ghostlight 791558459920.
- London cast (1990). Nymph Errant (CD). US: EMI Angel CDC 7 54079 2.
- London Symphony Orchestra conducted by John McGlinn (1989). Anything Goes (CD). US: EMI Angel 7 49848 2.
- Soundtrack (2003). Born to Dance (CD). Rhino Handmade RHM2 7778.
- Soundtracks (2003). Broadway Melody of 1940 (CD). US: Rhino Handmade RHM2 7601. Includes twelve tracks each from Broadway Melody of 1940 and Rosalie.
- Off-Broadway cast (1973). You Never Know (LP). US: Blue Pear BP 1015.
- 42nd Street Moon (2001). Leave It to Me! (CD). US: Music Box Recordings MBR 42002.
- 42nd Street Moon (1997). Something for the Boys (CD). US: Music Box Recordings MBR 42001.
- Original Broadway cast (1944, reissued 2004). Mexican Hayride (CD). US: Decca Broadway 000312502.
- Soundtrack (1951, reissued 2003). The Pirate (CD). US: Rhino Handmade RHM2 7762.
- Original Broadway cast (1948, reissued 1998). Kiss Me, Kate (CD). US: Columbia SK 60536.
- Encores! (1995). Out of This World (CD). US: DRG 94764. This revival included "From This Moment On" and "You Don't Remind Me", which were cut from the original production.
- Original Broadway cast (1953, reissued 1992). Can-Can (CD). US: Broadway Angel ZDM 7 64664 2 2.
- Original Broadway cast (1955, reissued 1989). Silk Stockings (CD). US: RCA Victor 1102-2-RG.
- Soundtrack (1956, reissued 1995). High Society (CD). US: Capitol CDP 0777 7 93787 2 2.
- Soundtrack (1960, reissued 1989). Can-Can (CD). US: Capitol CDP 7 91248 2. Like many film adaptations, the adaptation of Can-Can omitted many songs from the original and borrowed others from other Porter shows – but its soundtrack won a Grammy.
- Soundtrack (2004). De-Lovely (CD). US: Sony Music Soundtrax 5173342000. Includes performances by many contemporary rock, pop and jazz artists.

=== Tribute albums ===
==== Vocal ====
- Cole Porter (1994). Cole Sings Porter: Rare and Unreleased Songs from Can-Can and Jubilee (CD). US: Koch International Classics 3 7171 2H1.
- Bing Crosby (1949). Bing Crosby Sings Cole Porter Songs (LP). US: Decca DL-5064.
- Frank Sinatra (1953-1960, reissued 1991). Frank Sinatra Sings the Select Cole Porter (CD). US: Capitol C2-96611.
- Mabel Mercer (1955, reissued 1994). Mabel Mercer Sings Cole Porter (CD). US: Rhino R2 71690.*
- Ella Fitzgerald (1956, reissued 1993). Ella Fitzgerald Sings the Cole Porter Song Book (CD). US: MG V-4001-2.
- Anita O'Day (1959, reissued 1991). Anita O'Day Swings Cole Porter with Billy May (CD). US: Verve 849266-2.
- Various artists (1964-1990, reissued 1989-1990). Cole Porter Revisited and its four irregularly titled sequels (CD). US: Painted Smiles Records PSCD-121, 125, 105, 117 & 122. A wide array of stage and cabaret performers, some unexpectedly well-known, sing rarely performed Porter songs, recorded with varying quality.* Reissued, with improved sound, by Kritzerland Records.
- Julie London (1965, reissued 1991). All Through the Night: Julie London Sings the Choicest of Cole Porter (CD). US: EMI CDP-7-93455-2.
- Bobby Short (1971). Bobby Short Loves Cole Porter (LP). US: Atlantic. SD 2-606.*

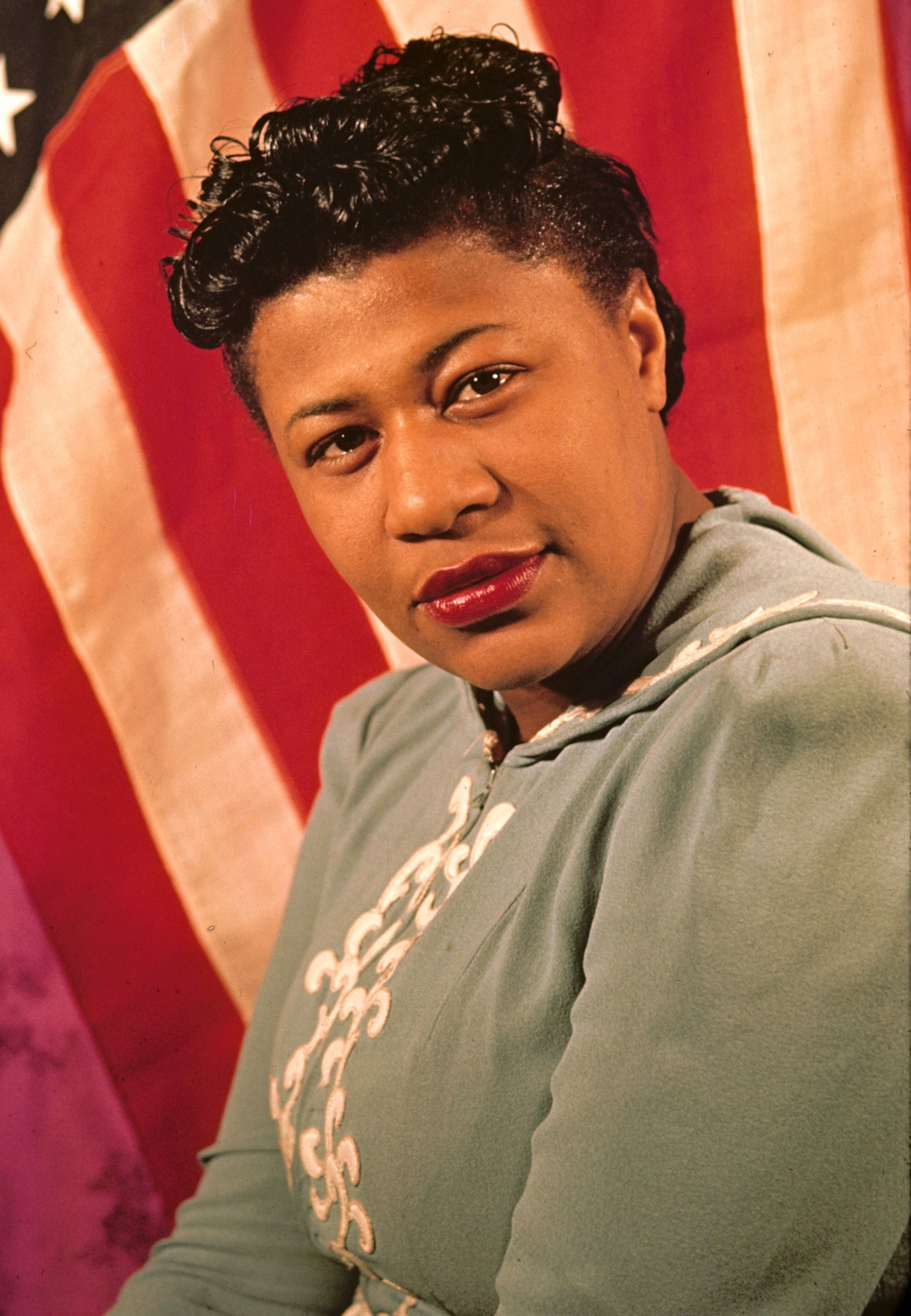
Fitzgerald made albums devoted to Porter

- Ella Fitzgerald (1972, reissued 1978 & 1992). Dream Dancing (reissue of Ella Loves Cole) (CD). US: Pablo PACD-2310-814-2.
- Julie Wilson (1989). Julie Wilson Sings the Cole Porter Songbook (CD). US: DRG CDSL 5208.*
- Thomas Hampson (1990). Night And Day (CD). US: EMC Classics CDC 7 54203 2.*
- Various artists (1990). Red Hot + Blue (CD). US: Chrysalis F2 21799. Performed by a diverse selection of contemporary rock and pop artists.
- Kiri Te Kanawa (1994). Kiri Sings Porter (CD). US: EMI Classics CDQ 55050.
- Rebecca Luker (1996). Anything Goes: Rebecca Luker Sings Cole Porter (CD). US: Varèse Sarabande VSD-5647.*
- Bobby Short (1998). You're the Top: The Love Songs of Cole Porter (CD). US: Telarc 83463.*
- Tony Bennett and Lady Gaga (2021). Love for Sale (CD). US: Columbia B0033584-02.

*Each of these albums includes some rarely recorded Porter songs.

==== Instrumental ====
- Randy Weston (1954, reissued in several multi-album compilations). Cole Porter in a Modern Mood (LP). US: Riverside RLP 2508.
- Charlie Parker (1957, reissued 1991). The Cole Porter Songbook (CD). US: Verve 823250-2.
- Oscar Peterson (1959, reissued 1986). Oscar Peterson Plays the Cole Porter Songbook. US: Verve 821987-2.
- Dave Brubeck Quartet (1967). Anything Goes! The Dave Brubeck Quartet Plays Cole Porter (LP). US: Columbia CS 9402.
- Earl Hines (1971, reissued 1996). Earl Hines Plays Cole Porter (CD). US: New World Records 80501.
- Lee Konitz and Red Mitchell (1974, reissued 1992). I Concentrate on You: A Tribute to Cole Porter (CD). US: Steeple Chase SCCD 31018
- London Sinfonietta conducted by John McGlinn (1990). Cole Porter: Overtures, Ballet: "Within the Quota" (CD). US: EMI Classics. D 105624.

=== Compilations ===
- Various artists (1991). American Songbook Series: Cole Porter (CD). US: Smithsonian RC 048-3/Sony A 22405. Includes many landmark recordings, both original cast and popular.
- Various artists (1992). You're the Top: Cole Porter in the 1930s (CD). US: Koch International Classics KIC-CD-7136. 3 CDs. The first volume of the Cole Porter Centennial Collection. Broad and deep. Features performers from the '30s through the '80s.
- Various artists (1994). From This Moment On: The Songs of Cole Porter (CD). US: Smithsonian RD 047/Sony A4-22481. A 4-CD expansion of the American Songbook Series compilation.
- Various artists (1994). The Cole Porter Songbook: Night and Day, I Get a Kick Out of You (both vocal), and Anything Goes (instrumental) (CD). US: Verve 314-519828-2. Jazz performances of Porter songs on Verve Records.
- Various artists (1999). You're Sensational: Cole Porter in the '20s, '40s, & '50s (CD). US: Sony A-33714. Cole Porter Centennial Collection Volume 2. As wide-ranging as its predecessor.
- Various artists (2001-2003). The Ultimate Cole Porter - Volume I through IV (CD). UK: Pearl GEM 0111, 0115, 0194 & 0195. Original cast recordings, some extremely rare, from Porter shows and films from 1919 through 1946.
- Various artists (2004). It's De Lovely - The Authentic Cole Porter Collection (CD). US: Bluebird. 82876 62180 2. Vocals and instrumentals, by Porter's contemporaries and Porter himself, from RCA recordings.
