= West Side Story (Earl Hines album) =

Live album by Earl Hines
- Released: 1975
- Recorded: July 2, 1974; Montreux Jazz Festival, Switzerland
- Genre: Jazz
- Length: 39:20
- Label: Black Lion; 162.018
- Producer: Alan Bates

Earl Hines chronology
Earl Hines Plays Cole Porter (1974)	West Side Story (1975)	Earl Hines at Sundown (1974)

West Side Story is a live album by pianist Earl Hines featuring selections from his solo performance at the 1974 Montreux Jazz Festival which was released on the British Black Lion label.

== Reception ==
Professional ratings
Review scores
Source	Rating
AllMusic	4/5 stars

AllMusic's Scott Yanow noted "Even at that late stage of his career, Hines constantly took chances and came up with surprising and consistently fresh ideas. This set is easily recommended, as are virtually all of his the pianist's unaccompanied solo albums".

== Track listing ==
1. "West Side Story Medley" (Leonard Bernstein) - 10:30
2. "(They Long to Be) Close to You" (Burt Bacharach, Hal David) - 3:42
3. "Why Do I Love You?" (Jerome Kern, Oscar Hammerstein II) - 6:43
4. "(In My) Solitude" (Duke Ellington, Eddie DeLange, Irving Mills) - 7:53
5. "Don't Get Around Much Anymore" (Ellington, Bob Russell) - 10:32

== Personnel ==
- Earl Hines - piano
