= Scoops Carry =

American jazz musician

- Birth name: George Dorman
- Also known as: Scoops Carey
- Born: January 23, 1915; Little Rock, Arkansas, U.S.
- Died: August 4, 1970 (aged 55); Chicago, Illinois, U.S.
- Genres: Jazz
- Instruments: Alto saxophone, clarinet

Scoops Carry (January 23, 1915 – August 4, 1970), born George Dorman and sometimes billed as Scoops Carey, was an American jazz alto saxophonist and clarinetist.

== Early life and education ==
Carry was born in Little Rock, Arkansas. His mother was a music teacher, and his brother, Ed Carry, was a Chicago-based bandleader and guitarist in the 1920s and 1930s. He started on horn at age eight, later studying at the Chicago Musical College and the University of Iowa. After his tenure with Hines, Carry left music and entered law school in 1947.

== Career ==
Carry worked with Cassino Simpson, the Midnight Revellers, and Boyd Atkins's Firecrackers in the late 1920s and early 1930s.

In 1931, he played with Lucky Millinder in RKO theater palaces. He reunited with his brother in 1932, and the pair co-led an orchestra through the middle of the 1930s. Following this, Scoops played with Zutty Singleton, Fletcher Henderson, and Roy Eldridge; in 1938 he was with Art Tatum, and in 1939 with Horace Henderson. At the end of the decade he worked briefly with Darnell Howard before joining Earl Hines's band in 1940.

Carry remained in Hines's employ until 1946, working with him in both large and small ensemble settings. After graduating from law school, he worked in the office of the Illinois state attorney.
