= Earl Hines Plays Duke Ellington Volume Two =

Compilation album by Earl Hines
- Released: 1997
- Recorded: December 10, 1971, November 27, 1972 and March 18, 1974; National Recording Studio, NYC
- Genre: Jazz
- Length: 67:21
- Labels: New World; 80532
- Producer: Bill Weilbacher

Earl Hines Plays Duke Ellington Volume Two is a compilation CD featuring recordings by pianist Earl Hines performing compositions by Duke Ellington which follows the first volume of tracks from LPs that Hines recorded for the Master Jazz label in sessions between 1971 and 1974. The recordings were reissued by New World

== Reception ==
Professional ratings
Review scores
Source	Rating
AllMusic	3/5 stars
Penguin Guide to Jazz	3.5/4 stars

Allmusic's Scott Yanow observed: " Hines recorded a ton of music during the era, but virtually every one of his releases is well worth getting. His chance-taking solos were sometimes hair-raising and always full of surprises". The Penguin Guide to Jazz selected this album as part of its suggested Core Collection.

== Track listing ==
1. "In a Mellow Tone" (Duke Ellington, Milt Gabler) - 7:28
2. "Solitude" (Ellington, Eddie DeLange, Irving Mills) - 8:10
3. "It Don't Mean a Thing (If It Ain't Got That Swing)" (Ellington, Mills) - 4:20
4. "I Let a Song Go Out of My Heart" (Ellington, Mills, Henry Nemo, John Redmond) - 6:45
5. "Satin Doll" (Ellington, Billy Strayhorn, Johnny Mercer) - 4:50
6. "In a Sentimental Mood" (Ellington) - 6:58
7. "Don't You Know I Care (Or Don't You Care to Know)" (Ellington, Mack David) - 6:55
8. "I'm Just a Lucky So-and-So" (Ellington, David) - 6:31
9. "Prelude to a Kiss" (Ellington, Irving Gordon, Mills) - 6:24
10. "All Too Soon" (Ellington, Carl Sigman) - 9:00
- Recorded at the Edison Hotel studio of National Recording on December 10, 1971 (track 5), November 27, 1972 (tracks 1–4 & 6) and March 18, 1974 (tracks 7–10)

== Personnel ==
- Earl Hines - piano
