= Panama Francis =

American drummer (1918–2001)

- Born: David Albert Francis; December 21, 1918; Miami, Florida, US
- Died: November 13, 2001 (aged 82) Orlando, Florida, US
- Genres: Jazz, swing, R&B
- Occupation: Musician
- Instrument: Drums
- Years active: 1930s–1980s

David Albert "Panama" Francis (December 21, 1918 – November 13, 2001) was an American swing jazz drummer who played on numerous hit recordings in the 1950s.

== Early life ==
Francis was born in Miami, Florida, on December 21, 1918. His father was Haitian, and "his mother came from an English property-owning background in the Bahamas". His father collected records. The young David was enthusiastic about music and playing the drums even before attending school. He initially played in marching bands and local drum and bugle corps.

== Career ==
Francis first played professionally in the 1930s. He was part of George Kelly's band from 1934 to 1938, and was then with the Florida Collegians in 1938. After moving to New York that year, he worked with Tab Smith, Billy Hicks, and Roy Eldridge before the 1940s. Francis acquired his nickname from Eldridge "at a moment when [Francis] was wearing a panama hat and Eldridge could not remember his new drummer's name".

Francis joined Lucky Millinder's big band in 1940, so often played at the Savoy Ballroom. After leaving Millinder he was with Willie Bryant's band (1946), and then Cab Calloway (1947–52); he was in three short films alongside the latter.

For much of the 1950s, Francis was a studio musician in New York, accompanying rhythm-and-blues and rock-and-roll groups and singers. The hits he played on included: Bobby Darin ("Splish Splash"); the Four Seasons ("Big Girls Don't Cry", "Walk Like a Man"); the Platters ("The Great Pretender", "My Prayer", "Only You", "Smoke Gets in Your Eyes"), Dion DiMucci "Runaround Sue", Neil Sedaka ("Calendar Girl"); and Jackie Wilson ("Reet Petite").

From 1963 Francis toured with singer Dinah Shore for five years. He then resided in California but struggled to find work. He toured Japan with saxophonist Sam "the Man" Taylor in 1970–71, and appeared on film again in 1972, in Lady Sings the Blues. Back in New York, Francis was part of Sy Oliver's nonet from 1973 to 1975, during which time he also appeared at jazz festivals and toured internationally with other bands. He revived the Savoy Sultans jazz and dance band in 1979, and he appeared regularly at the Rainbow Room in New York City for eight years from 1980. Francis became drummer in the Benny Goodman Quartet for concerts in 1982. He appeared in the 1994 film The Statesmen of Jazz as a member of the Statesmen of Jazz.

== Personal life and final years ==
David Francis died on November 13, 2001, following a stroke, at age 82.

== Discography ==
=== As leader ===
- Latin American Dixieland (MGM, 1954)
- Exploding Drums (Epic, 1959)
- The Beat Behind the Million Sellers (ABC-Paramount, 1960)
- Gettin' in the Groove (Black and Blue, 1979)
- Panama Francis and the Savoy Sultans (Classic Jazz, 1980)

=== As sideman ===
With Eddie Barefield

- Eddie Barefield (RCA, 1974)
- The Indestructible E. B. (Famous Door, 1977)

With Tony Bennett

- To My Wonderful One (Columbia, 1960)

With Ray Bryant

- Groove House (Sue, 1963)
- Hot Turkey (Black and Blue, 1979)

With Milt Buckner

- Green Onions (Black and Blue, 1975)
- Midnight Slows Vol 6 (Black and Blue, 1977)

With Solomon Burke

- If You Need Me (Atlantic, 1963)
- King Solomon (Atlantic, 1968)

With Cab Calloway

- Hi De Ho Man (Columbia, 1974)
- Jumpin' Jive (CBS, 1984)

With Ray Charles

- Sweet & Sour Tears (ABC, 1964)

With Arnett Cobb

- Jumpin' at the Woodside (Black and Blue, 1974)
- The Wild Man from Texas (Black and Blue, 1977)
- Keep On Pushin' (Bee Hive, 1984)

With Ray Conniff

- 'S Awful Nice (Columbia, 1958)
- Ray Conniff's Concert in Stereo (CBS, 1970)
- Live in Japan (CBS, 1975)

With Sam Cooke

- My Kind of Blues (RCA Victor, 1961)
- Twistin' the Night Away (RCA Victor, 1962)

With Dion DiMucci

- Runaround Sue (Laurie Records, 1961)

With Earl Hines

- Hines '74 (Black & Blue, 1974)
- Earl Hines at Sundown (Black & Blue, 1974)
- The Dirty Old Men (Black and Blue, 1978)

With John Lee Hooker

- It Serve You Right to Suffer (Impulse! Records, 1966)

With Brownie McGhee and Sonny Terry

- A Long Way from Home (Bluesway, 1969)
- I Couldn't Believe My Eyes (Bluesway, 1973)

With Wilson Pickett

- In the Midnight Hour (Atlantic Records, 1965)

With Big Joe Turner

- Singing the Blues (BluesWay, 1967)
- Joe's Back in Town (Black and Blue, 1974)
- Effervescent (Classic Jazz, 1979)

With others

- Red Allen, Jazz at the Metropole Cafe (Bethlehem, 1955)
- Casey Anderson, The Bag I'm In (Atco, 1962)
- Cat Anderson, Cat on a Hot Tin Horn (Mercury, 1958)
- Doc Bagby, A Place in the Sun (Current, 1967)
- Mickey Baker, The Blues and Me (Black and Blue, 1974)
- Emmett Berry, Buddy Tate, Beauty and the Blues (Columbia, 1960)
- Big Maybelle, Gabbin' Blues and Other Big Hits (Epic, 1968)
- Eubie Blake, The Marches I Played on the Old Ragtime Piano (20th Fox, 1960)
- Nappy Brown, Don't Be Angry! (Savoy, 1984)
- James Brown, Please Please Please (King, 1958)
- James Brown, Try Me! (King, 1959)
- James Brown, Out of Sight (Smash, 1964)
- James Brown, Showtime (Smash, 1964)
- Oscar Brown, Sin & Soul (Columbia, 1960)
- Gene Conners, Coming Home (Belter, 1978)
- Dorothy Donegan, The Many Faces of Dorothy Donegan (Mahogany, 1975)
- Roy Eldridge, At the Arcadia Ballroom Broadway New York City 1939 (Musidisc, 1975)
- Roy Gaines, Superman (Black and Blue, 1975)
- Dizzy Gillespie, The Melody Lingers On (Limelight, 1966)
- Lloyd Glenn, Old Time Shuffle (Black and Blue, 1976)
- Tiny Grimes, Some Groovy Fours (Black and Blue, 1974)
- Lionel Hampton, At Newport '78 (Timeless, 1980)
- Woody Herman, Hey! Heard the Herd? (Verve, 1963)
- Eddie Heywood, Eddie Heywood at the Piano (Mercury, 1960)
- Claude Hopkins, Music of the Early Jazz Dances (20th Fox, 1958)
- Dick Hyman, Traditional Jazz Piano (Project 3, 1973)
- Johnny Letman, The Many Angles of John Letman (Bethlehem, 1960)
- Little Willie John, Fever (Regency, 1956)
- Odetta, Sometimes I Feel Like Cryin' (RCA Victor, 1962)
- Andrew Odom, Farther on Down the Road (Bluesway, 1973)
- Red Prysock, Swing Softly Red (Mercury, 1961)
- Louisiana Red, Lowdown Back Porch Blues (Lowdown Back Porch, 1963)
- Charlie Shavers, Horn o' Plenty (Bethlehem, 1954)
- Carrie Smith, Do Your Duty (Black and Blue, 1976)
- David T. Walker, Going Up! (Revue, 1969)
- Dick Wellstood, Fats Waller Revisited (Classic Jazz, 1975)
- Jimmy Witherspoon, Sing the Blues with Panama Francis and the Savoy Sultans (Muse, 1983)

== Singles ==
Year	Title	Artist	Date	U.S. chart	R&B chart	UK chart	Producer	Notes
1955	"Only You (And You Alone)"	The Platters	April 26	5	1	18		Buck Ram plays piano
1955	"The Great Pretender"	The Platters		1	1	5	Buck Ram	
1956	"I Put a Spell On You"	Screaming Jay Hawkins	September 12					
1956	"My Prayer"	The Platters		1	22	4	Buck Ram	
1958	"Splish Splash"	Bobby Darin	May 19	3	1	28		
1958	"Smoke Gets in Your Eyes"	The Platters		1	3	1	Buck Ram	
1960	"Lullabye"	The Chevrons	July 20					
1959	"What a Diff'rence a Day Made"	Dinah Washington	February 19	8	4			with the Belford Hendricks Orchestra
1959	"I Cried a Tear"	LaVern Baker		6	2		Ahmet Ertegun, Jerry Wexler	
1961	"Runaround Sue"	Dion		4	11	11	Gene Schwartz, Dion	backing vocals by the Del Satins
1962	"Big Girls Don't Cry"	The Four Seasons	October	1	1	13	Bob Crewe	
1962	"Prisoner of Love"	James Brown	December 17	18	6		James Brown, Hal Neely	
1963	"Walk Like a Man"	The Four Seasons	January 1962	1	3	12	Bob Crewe	
