= Hines '74 =

Studio album by Earl Hines
- Released: 1974
- Recorded: July 16, 1974; SEED studio, Valauris, France
- Genre: Jazz
- Label: Black & Blue; 33.073
- Producer: Gerhard Lehner

Earl Hines chronology
The Giants (1974)	Hines '74 (1974)	Earl Hines at Sundown (1974)

Hines '74 is an album by pianist Earl Hines recorded in France in 1974 for the Black & Blue label.

== Reception ==
Professional ratings
Review scores
Source	Rating
AllMusic	4/5 stars

Allmusic awarded the album 4 stars stating "Even though this enjoyable date is not the best starting point for a jazz fan who is just beginning to explore the recorded legacy of Earl Hines, those already familiar with his work will enjoy this".

== Track listing ==
1. "Tangerine" (Victor Schertzinger, Johnny Mercer) - 3:19
2. "There'll Be Some Changes Made" (W. Benton Overstreet, Billy Higgins) - 7:57
3. "You're Driving Me Crazy" (Walter Donaldson) - 7:06
4. "Makin' Whoopee" (Donaldson, Gus Kahn) - 8:46
5. "My Buddy" (Donaldson, Kahn) - 9:24

== Personnel ==
- Earl Hines - piano
- Jimmy Leary - bass
- Panama Francis - drums
