= Earl Hines Plays Duke Ellington =

Compilation album by Earl Hines
- Released: 1988
- Recorded: June 1, 1971, December 10, 1971, November 27, 1972, March 18, 1974 and April 29, 1975
- Studio: National Recording Studio, NYC
- Genre: Jazz
- Length: 120:10
- Label: New World; 80361
- Producer: Bill Weilbacher

Earl Hines Plays Duke Ellington is a compilation double album set featuring solo recordings by pianist Earl Hines performing compositions by Duke Ellington which were originally released as a series of four LPs that Hines recorded for the Master Jazz label in four separate sessions between 1971 and 1975 and rereleased on the New World label on LP in 1988 and on CD in 1992. It was followed by a second volume in 1997.

== Reception ==
Professional ratings
Review scores
Source	Rating
Allmusic	4.5/5 stars
Penguin Guide to Jazz	4/4 stars

Allmusic's Scott Yanow noted "The music is satisfying". The Penguin Guide to Jazz selected this album as part of its suggested Core Collection.

== Track listing ==
All compositions by Duke Ellington, except where noted.

Disc one

1. "Love You Madly" - 5:16
2. "Sophisticated Lady" (Ellington, Mitchell Parish, Irving Mills) - 4:13
3. "I'm Beginning to See the Light" (Ellington, Johnny Hodges, Harry James, Don George) - 4:13
4. "Black and Tan Fantasy" (Ellington, Bubber Miley) - 3:51
5. "Warm Valley" (Ellington, Bob Russell) - 7:25
6. "Do Nothin' Till You Hear from Me" (Ellington, Russell) - 3:44
7. "C Jam Blues" - 4:31
8. "Caravan" (Juan Tizol, Ellington, Mills) - 5:57
9. "Everything but You" (Ellington, James, George) - 4:37
10. "Mood Indigo" (Ellington, Barney Bigard, Mills) - 6:58
11. "Just Squeeze Me" (Ellington, Lee Gaines) - 5:09
12. "Come Sunday" - 5:10

Disc two

1. "Creole Love Call" - 7:10
2. "I Ain't Got Nothin' but the Blues" (Ellington, George) - 6:37
3. "The Shepherd" - 10:47
4. "Don't Get Around Much Anymore" (Ellington, Russell) - 6:59
5. "Black Butterfly" (Ellington, Mills) - 10:44
6. "Take Love Easy" (Ellington, John La Touche) - 6:22
7. "The Jeep Is Jumpin'" (Ellington, Hodges) - 4:53
8. "Heaven" - 5:49

Note

- Recorded at the Edison Hotel studio of National Recording on June 1, 1971 (Disc One: track 10), December 10, 1971 (Disc One: tracks 1–3, 5–7, 9 & 12), November 27, 1972 (Disc Two: track 4), March 18, 1974 (Disc One: tracks 4, 8 & 11) and April 29, 1975 (Disc Two: tracks 1–3 & 5–8)

== Personnel ==
- Earl Hines - piano
