= The Dirty Old Men =

Hines '74

Studio album by Earl Hines
- Released: 1974
- Recorded: July 18, 1974; SEED studio, Valauris, France
- Genre: Jazz
- Label: Black & Blue; 33.084
- Producer: Gerhard Lehner

Earl Hines chronology
Earl Hines at Sundown (1974)	Hines '74 (1974)	Hot Sonatas (1975)

Budd Johnson chronology
Ya! Ya! (1963)	The Dirty Old Men (1974)	In Memory of a Very Dear Friend (1978)

The Dirty Old Men (rereleased as Mr. Bechet) is an album by pianist Earl Hines and saxophonist Budd Johnson recorded in France in 1974 for the Black & Blue label.

== Reception ==
Professional ratings
Review scores
Source	Rating
AllMusic	4/5 stars
The Penguin Guide to Jazz Recordings	3/4 stars

The AllMusic review by Ken Dryden stated: "Budd Johnson didn't do much recording as a leader, so this French studio date is particularly valuable".

== Track listing ==
1. "Mr. Bechet" (Budd Johnson) - 4:34 Bonus track on CD reissue
2. "Blues for Sale" (Earl Hines, Budd Johnson) - 9:24
3. "Gone with the Wind" (Allie Wrubel, Herb Magidson) - 4:46
4. "If You Were Mine" (Matty Malneck, Johnny Mercer) - 4:42
5. "Am I Waisting My Time" (Irving Bibo, Howard Johnson) - 4:46
6. "The Dirty Old Man" (Budd Johnson) - 9:08
7. "Linger Awhile" (Harry Owens, Vincent Rose) - 5:59

== Personnel ==
- Earl Hines - piano
- Budd Johnson - tenor saxophone, soprano saxophone
- Jimmy Leary - bass
- Panama Francis - drums
