= Earl Hines Plays Cole Porter =

Studio album by Earl Hines
- Released: 1975
- Recorded: April 16, 1974
- Studio: RCA Studios, NYC
- Genre: Jazz
- Length: 46:44
- Label: Swaggie; S1345; New World; 80501
- Producer: Bill Weilbacher

Earl Hines chronology
Earl Hines at Saralee's (1974)	Earl Hines Plays Cole Porter (1975)	West Side Story (1974)

Swaggie cover

Earl Hines Plays Cole Porter is a solo album by pianist Earl Hines performing compositions by Cole Porter which was originally released as an LP on the Australian Swaggie label and rereleased on the New World label on CD in 1996.

== Reception ==
Professional ratings
Review scores
Source	Rating
AllMusic	4/5 stars
The Penguin Guide to Jazz	3.5/4 stars

AllMusic reviewer Scott Yanow commented: "Hines interprets the compositions as if he had been familiar with them for decades. His chancetaking improvisations have their hair raising moments (particularly when he suspends time) and are quite exciting. A superb effort by the immortal pianist who at 71 still seemed to be improving".

== Track listing ==
All compositions by Cole Porter.

1. "You Do Something to Me" - 7:39
2. "Night and Day" - 9:50
3. "Rosalie" - 4:08
4. "I've Got You Under My Skin" - 8:12
5. "I Get a Kick Out of You" - 4:11
6. "What Is This Thing Called Love?" - 5:00
7. "You'd Be So Easy to Love" - 7:38

== Personnel ==
- Earl Hines - piano
