= Earl Hines at Sundown =

Studio album by Earl Hines
- Released: 1974
- Recorded: July 16, 1974; SEED studio, Valauris, France
- Genre: Jazz
- Label: Black & Blue; 33.116
- Producer: Gerhard Lehner

Earl Hines chronology
Hines '74 (1974)	Earl Hines at Sundown (1974)	The Dirty Old Men (1974)

Earl Hines at Sundown is an album by pianist Earl Hines recorded in France in 1974 for the Black & Blue label.

== Reception ==
Professional ratings
Review scores
Source	Rating
AllMusic	4/5 stars

Allmusic reviewer Ken Dryden stated: "The pianist is in terrific form on At Sundown... an excellent example of Hines' productive final years".

== Track listing ==
1. "There Will Never Be Another You" (Harry Warren, Mack Gordon) - 8:20
2. "At Sundown" (Walter Donaldson) - 9:33
3. "Love Me or Leave Me" (Donaldson, Gus Kahn) - 7:11
4. "I Hadn't Anyone Till You" (Ray Noble) - 4:12
5. "Velvet Moon" (Eddie DeLange, Josef Myrow) - 5:26

== Personnel ==
- Earl Hines - piano
- Jimmy Leary - bass
- Panama Francis - drums
