= Earl Hines =

American jazz pianist (1903–1983)

Earl "Fatha" Hines
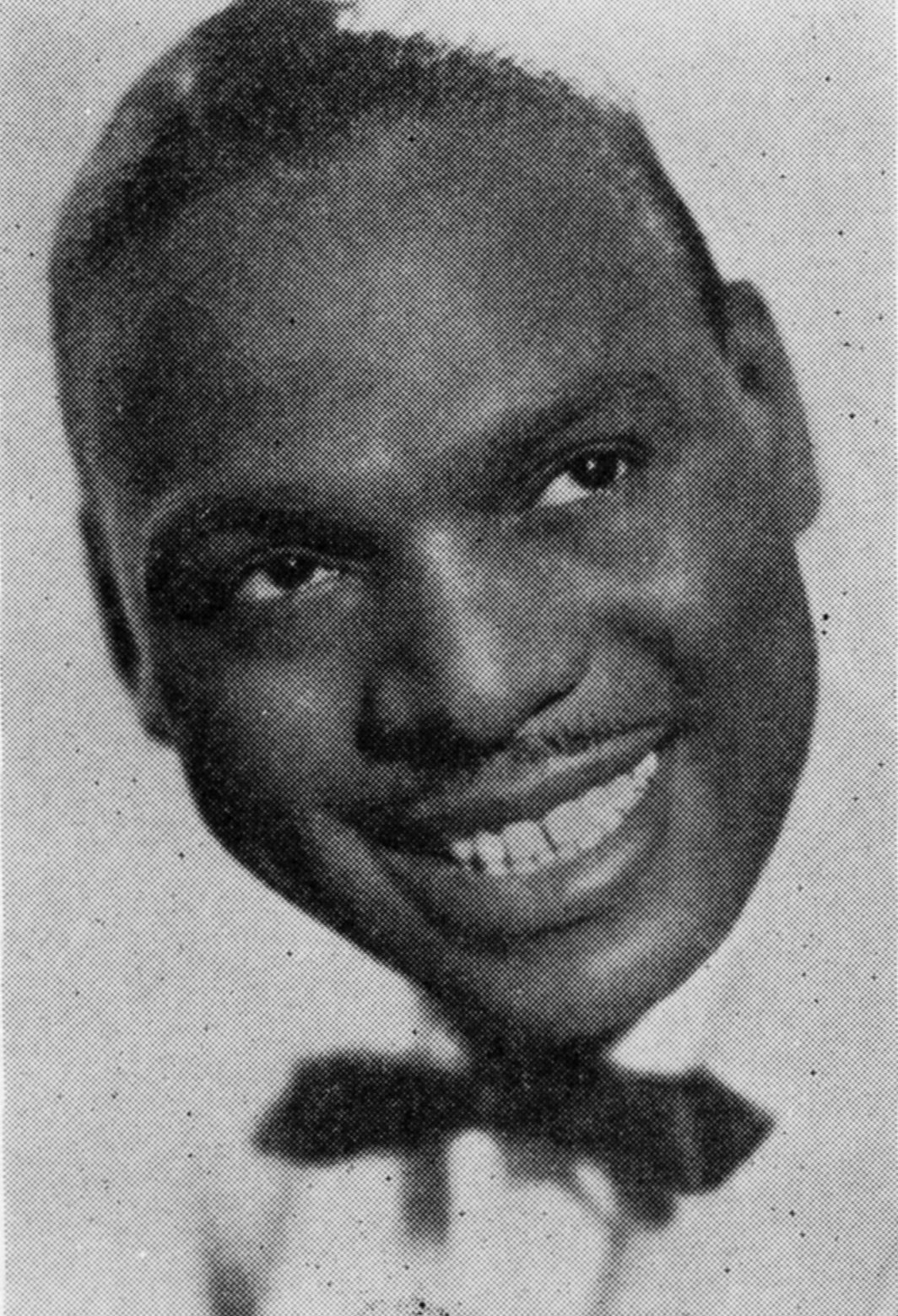
- Hines in 1936

Background information
- Born: Earl Kenneth Hines; December 28, 1903; Duquesne, Pennsylvania, U.S.
- Died: April 22, 1983 (aged 79) Oakland, California, U.S.
- Genres: Jazz; swing
- Occupations: Musician; bandleader
- Instrument: Piano
- Years active: 1921–1983
- Labels: Columbia; Brunswick; Fantasy; Capitol; RCA Victor; Impulse!; Verve; Delmark; Black & Blue; Black Lion; Chiaroscuro

Earl Kenneth Hines (December 28, 1903 (Note: Hines quotes his year of birth as 1905 (Dance 1983, p. 7). Most sources agree 1903 is correct.) – April 22, 1983), also known as Earl "Fatha" (Note: Disagreement persists over the origin of the name "Fatha" (from 'father'). The most common account is that a radio announcer (some say Ted Pearson), possibly after Hines had accused him of being drunk, announced, "Here comes 'Fatha' Hines through the deep forest with his children", "Deep Forest" being the band's signature tune. (Cook 2005) Others have suggested it was because Hines had "...given birth to a style—more than a style, a virtual language—of jazz piano". (Epstein 1999)) Hines, was an American jazz pianist and bandleader. He was one of the most influential figures in the development of jazz piano and, according to one source, "one of a small number of pianists whose playing shaped the history of jazz".

The trumpeter Dizzy Gillespie (a member of Hines's big band, along with Charlie Parker) wrote:

The piano is the basis of modern harmony. This little guy came out of Chicago, Earl Hines. He changed the style of the piano. You can find the roots of Bud Powell, Herbie Hancock, all the guys who came after that. If it hadn't been for Earl Hines blazing the path for the next generation to come, it's no telling where or how they would be playing now. There were individual variations but the style of … the modern piano came from Earl Hines.

The pianist Lennie Tristano said, "Earl Hines is the only one of us capable of creating real jazz and real swing when playing all alone." Horace Silver said, "He has a completely unique style. No one can get that sound, no other pianist." Erroll Garner said, "When you talk about greatness, you talk about Art Tatum and Earl Hines." Count Basie said that Hines was "the greatest piano player in the world".

== Biography ==
=== Early life ===
Earl Hines was born in Duquesne, Pennsylvania, 12 miles from the center of Pittsburgh, in 1903. His father, Joseph Hines, (Note: Hines's father was a foreman in the coal docks. His mother died when he was three, but Hines appreciated his upbringing in a 12-room house with his father, his stepmother ("who did a great job"), his grandparents, two cousins, two uncles and an aunt. There was a smallholding at the back with two cows, pigs, chickens. "We needed to buy very little so far as food was concerned, because we raised nearly everything that we ate." (Dance 1983, p. 7)) played cornet and was the leader of the Eureka Brass Band in Pittsburgh, and his stepmother was a church organist. Hines intended to follow his father on cornet, but "blowing" hurt him behind the ears, whereas the piano did not. The young Hines took lessons in playing classical piano. By the age of 11, he was playing the organ in his Baptist church. He had a "good ear and a good memory" and could replay songs after hearing them in theaters and park concerts: "I'd be playing songs from these shows months before the song copies came out. That astonished a lot of people and they'd ask where I heard these numbers and I'd tell them at the theatre where my parents had taken me." Later, Hines said that he was playing piano around Pittsburgh "before the word 'jazz' was even invented".

=== Early career ===
With his father's approval, Hines left home at the age of 17 to take a job playing piano with Lois Deppe and His Symphonian Serenaders in the Liederhaus, a Pittsburgh nightclub. He got his board, two meals a day, and $15 a week. Deppe (later a member of the Detroit McKinney's Cotton Pickers), a well-known baritone concert artist who sang both classical and popular songs, also used the young Hines as his concert accompanist and took him on his concert trips to New York. In 1921, Hines and Deppe became the first African Americans to perform on radio.

Hines's first recordings were accompanying Deppe – four sides recorded for Gennett Records in 1923. Only two of these were issued, one of which was a Hines composition, "Congaine", "a keen snappy foxtrot", which also featured a solo by Hines. He entered the studio again with Deppe a month later to record spirituals and popular songs, including "Sometimes I Feel Like a Motherless Child" and "For the Last Time Call Me Sweetheart". He also accompanied Ethel Waters, describing his strategy as playing "under what the artist is doing" by listening "to the changes she made."

In 1925, after much family debate, Hines moved to Chicago, Illinois, then the world's jazz capital, the home of Jelly Roll Morton and King Oliver. Hines started in Elite No. 2 Club but soon joined Carroll Dickerson's band, with whom he also toured on the Pantages Theatre Circuit to Los Angeles and back.

Hines met Louis Armstrong in the poolroom of the Black Musicians' Union, local 208, on State and 39th in Chicago. Hines was 21, Armstrong 24. They played the union's piano together. (Note: Also, "According to Hines, he was sitting there playing 'The One I Love Belongs to Somebody Else' when Armstrong walked in and began to play along". (Collier 1983, p. 158)) Armstrong was astounded by Hines's avant-garde "trumpet-style" piano playing, often using dazzlingly fast octaves so that on none-too-perfect upright pianos (and with no amplification) "they could hear me out front". Richard Cook wrote in Jazz Encyclopedia that

[Hines's] most dramatic departure from what other pianists were then playing was his approach to the underlying pulse: he would charge against the metre of the piece being played, accent off-beats, introduce sudden stops and brief silences. In other hands this might sound clumsy or all over the place but Hines could keep his bearings with uncanny resilience.

Armstrong and Hines became good friends and shared a car. Armstrong joined Hines in Carroll Dickerson's band at the Sunset Cafe. In 1927, this became Armstrong's band under the musical direction of Hines. Later that year, Armstrong revamped his Okeh Records recording-only band, Louis Armstrong and His Hot Five, and hired Hines as the pianist, replacing his wife, Lil Hardin Armstrong, on the instrument.

Armstrong and Hines then recorded what are often regarded as some of the most important jazz records ever made.

... with Earl Hines arriving on piano, Armstrong was already approaching the stature of a concerto soloist, a role he would play more or less throughout the next decade, which makes these final small-group sessions something like a reluctant farewell to jazz's first golden age. Since Hines is also magnificent on these discs (and their insouciant exuberance is a marvel on the duet showstopper "Weather Bird") the results seem like eavesdropping on great men speaking almost quietly among themselves. There is nothing in jazz finer or more moving than the playing on "West End Blues", "Tight Like This", "Beau Koo Jack" and "Muggles".

In the days of 78 rpm records, recording engineers were unable to play back a take without rendering the wax master unusable for commercial release, so the band did not hear the final version of "West End Blues" until it was issued by Okeh a few weeks later. "Earl Hines, he was surprised when the record came out on the market, 'cause he brought it by my house, you know, we'd forgotten we'd recorded it", Armstrong recalled in 1956. But they liked what they heard. "When it first came out", Hines said, "Louis and I stayed by that recording practically an hour and a half or two hours and we just knocked each other out because we had no idea it was gonna turn out as good as it did."

The Sunset Cafe closed in 1927. (Note: At various time Hines played much of Chicago's "Bright-Light" district: The Elite Club, The Regal Theatre, The Apex Club, The Platinum Lounge, The Vendome Theatre, The Grand Terrace, The New Grand Terrace, The Sunset Café, The Savoy Ballroom, Warwick Hall. See key to map of Chicago South Side jazz c.1915-1930 at University of Chicago Jazz Archive (The Leon Lewis map).) Hines, Armstrong, and the drummer Zutty Singleton agreed that they would become the "Unholy Three" – they would "stick together and not play for anyone unless the three of us were hired". But as Louis Armstrong and His Stompers (with Hines as musical director), they ran into difficulties trying to establish their own venue, the Warwick Hall Club, which they rented for a year with the management help of Lil Hardin Armstrong. Hines went briefly to New York and returned to find that Armstrong and Singleton had rejoined the rival Dickerson band at the new Savoy Ballroom in his absence, (Note: The Jazz Age Chicago described the venue: The Savoy Ballroom opened for business on Thanksgiving Eve, November 23, 1927. With more than a half-acre of dancing space, the Savoy had a capacity of over four thousand persons. The ballroom's name recalled the enormously popular and highly regarded dance palace of the same name in New York's Harlem, which had opened a little more than a year earlier. ... In its review of the Savoy, the Defender, Chicago's leading black newspaper, extolled the modern features of the new ballroom: "Never before have Chicagoans seen anything quite as lavish as the Savoy ballroom. Famous artists have transformed the building into a veritable paradise, each section more beautiful than the other. The feeling of luxury and comfort one gets upon entering is quite ideal and homelike, and the desire to stay and dance and look on is generated with each moment of your visit. Every modern convenience is provided. In addition to a house physician and a professional nurse for illness or accident, there is an ideal lounging room for ladies and gentlemen, luxuriously furnished, a boudoir room for milady's makeup convenience, an ultra modern checking room which accommodates 6,000 hats and coats individually hung so that if one comes in with his or her coat crushed or wrinkled it is in better condition when leaving." Such modern amenities not only lent an "atmosphere of refinement" to the ballroom that reflected the class pretensions of upwardly mobile black Chicagoans, but also decreased the likelihood that the Savoy would draw fire from those advocating the closure of disorderly dance establishments. An adjacent 1,000-space parking lot also likely appealed to more prosperous black Chicagoans. ... The music never stopped at the Savoy. From 1927 until 1940, two bands were engaged every night to permit continuous dancing. When one band took a break, another was on hand to play on. During these years, the Savoy was open seven days a week, with matinees on Saturdays and Sundays. Although most of the Savoy's patrons were black, growing numbers of white Chicagoans visited the Savoy to hear and dance to the great jazz bands of the day. ("Savoy Ballroom". Jazz Age Chicago. Archived from the original on March 24, 2004.)) leaving Hines feeling "warm". When Armstrong and Singleton later asked him to join them with Dickerson at the Savoy Ballroom, Hines said, "No, you guys left me in the rain and broke the little corporation we had".

Hines joined the clarinetist Jimmie Noone at the Apex, an after-hours speakeasy, playing from midnight to 6 a.m., seven nights a week. In 1928, he recorded 14 sides with Noone and again with Armstrong (for a total of 38 sides with Armstrong). His first piano solos were recorded late that year: eight for QRS Records in New York and then seven for Okeh Records in Chicago, all except two his own compositions.

Hines moved in with Kathryn Perry (with whom he had recorded "Sadie Green the Vamp of New Orleans"). Hines said of her, "She'd been at The Sunset too, in a dance act. She was a very charming, pretty girl. She had a good voice and played the violin. I had been divorced and she became my common-law wife. We lived in a big apartment and her parents stayed with us". Perry recorded several times with Hines, including "Body and Soul" in 1935. They stayed together until 1940, when Hines "divorced" her to marry Ann Jones Reed, but that marriage was soon "indefinitely postponed".

Hines married singer 'Lady of Song' Janie Moses in 1947. They had two daughters, Janear (born 1950) and Tosca. Both daughters died before he did, Tosca in 1976 and Janear in 1981. Janie divorced him on June 14, 1979, and died in 2007. However, two other children from Laurice Penn exist: Michael Gordon Penn (1960) and Sandra Penn Wilson (1962 - 2023).

=== Chicago years ===
On December 28, 1928 (his 25th birthday and six weeks before the Saint Valentine's Day Massacre), Hines opened at Chicago's Grand Terrace Cafe leading his own big band, a prestigious position in the jazz world at the time. "All America was dancing", Hines said, and for the next 12 years and through the worst of the Great Depression and Prohibition, Hines's band was the orchestra at the Grand Terrace. The Hines Orchestra – or "Organization", as Hines preferred it – had up to 28 musicians and did three shows a night at the Grand Terrace, four shows every Saturday and sometimes Sundays. According to Stanley Dance, "Earl Hines and The Grand Terrace were to Chicago what Duke Ellington and The Cotton Club were to New York – but fierier."

The Grand Terrace was controlled by the gangster Al Capone, so Hines became Capone's "Mr Piano Man". The Grand Terrace upright piano was soon replaced by a white $3,000 Bechstein grand. Talking about those days Hines later said:

... Al [Capone] came in there one night and called the whole band and show together and said, "Now we want to let you know our position. We just want you people just to attend to your own business. We'll give you all the Protection in the world but we want you to be like the 3 monkeys: you hear nothing and you see nothing and you say nothing". And that's what we did. And I used to hear many of the things that they were going to do but I never did tell anyone. Sometimes the Police used to come in ... looking for a fall guy and say, "Earl what were they talking about?" ... but I said, "I don't know – no, you're not going to pin that on me," because they had a habit of putting the pictures of different people that would bring information in the newspaper and the next day you would find them out there in the lake somewhere swimming around with some chains attached to their feet if you know what I mean.

From the Grand Terrace, Hines and his band broadcast on "open mikes" over many years, sometimes seven nights a week, coast-to-coast across America – Chicago being well placed to deal with live broadcasting across time zones in the United States. The Hines band became the most broadcast band in America. Among the listeners were a young Nat King Cole and Jay McShann in Kansas City, who said his "real education came from Earl Hines. When 'Fatha' went off the air, I went to bed." Hines's most significant "student" was Art Tatum.

The Hines band usually comprised 15–20 musicians on stage, occasionally up to 28. Among the band's many members were Wallace Bishop, Alvin Burroughs, Scoops Carry, Oliver Coleman, Bob Crowder, Thomas Crump, George Dixon, Julian Draper, Streamline Ewing, Ed Fant, Milton Fletcher, Walter Fuller, Dizzy Gillespie, Leroy Harris, Woogy Harris, Darnell Howard, Cecil Irwin, Harry 'Pee Wee' Jackson, Warren Jefferson, Budd Johnson, Jimmy Mundy, Ray Nance, Charlie Parker, Willie Randall, Omer Simeon, Cliff Smalls, Leon Washington, Freddie Webster, Quinn Wilson and Trummy Young.

Occasionally, Hines allowed another pianist sit in for him, the better to allow him to conduct the whole "Organization". Jess Stacy was one, Nat "King" Cole and Teddy Wilson were others, but Cliff Smalls was his favorite.

Each summer, Hines toured with his whole band for three months, including through the South – the first black big band to do so. He explained, "[when] we traveled by train through the South, they would send a porter back to our car to let us know when the dining room was cleared, and then we would all go in together. We couldn't eat when we wanted to. We had to eat when they were ready for us."

In Duke Ellington's America, Harvey G. Cohen writes:

In 1931, Earl Hines and his Orchestra "were the first big Negro band to travel extensively through the South". Hines referred to it as an "invasion" rather than a "tour". Between a bomb exploding under their bandstage in Alabama (" ...we didn't none of us get hurt but we didn't play so well after that either") and numerous threatening encounters with the Police, the experience proved so harrowing that Hines in the 1960s recalled that, "You could call us the first Freedom Riders". For the most part, any contact with whites, even fans, was viewed as dangerous. Finding places to eat or stay overnight entailed a constant struggle. The only non-musical 'victory' that Hines claimed was winning the respect of a clothing-store owner who initially treated Hines with derision until it became clear that Hines planned to spend $85 on shirts, "which changed his whole attitude".

=== The birth of bebop ===
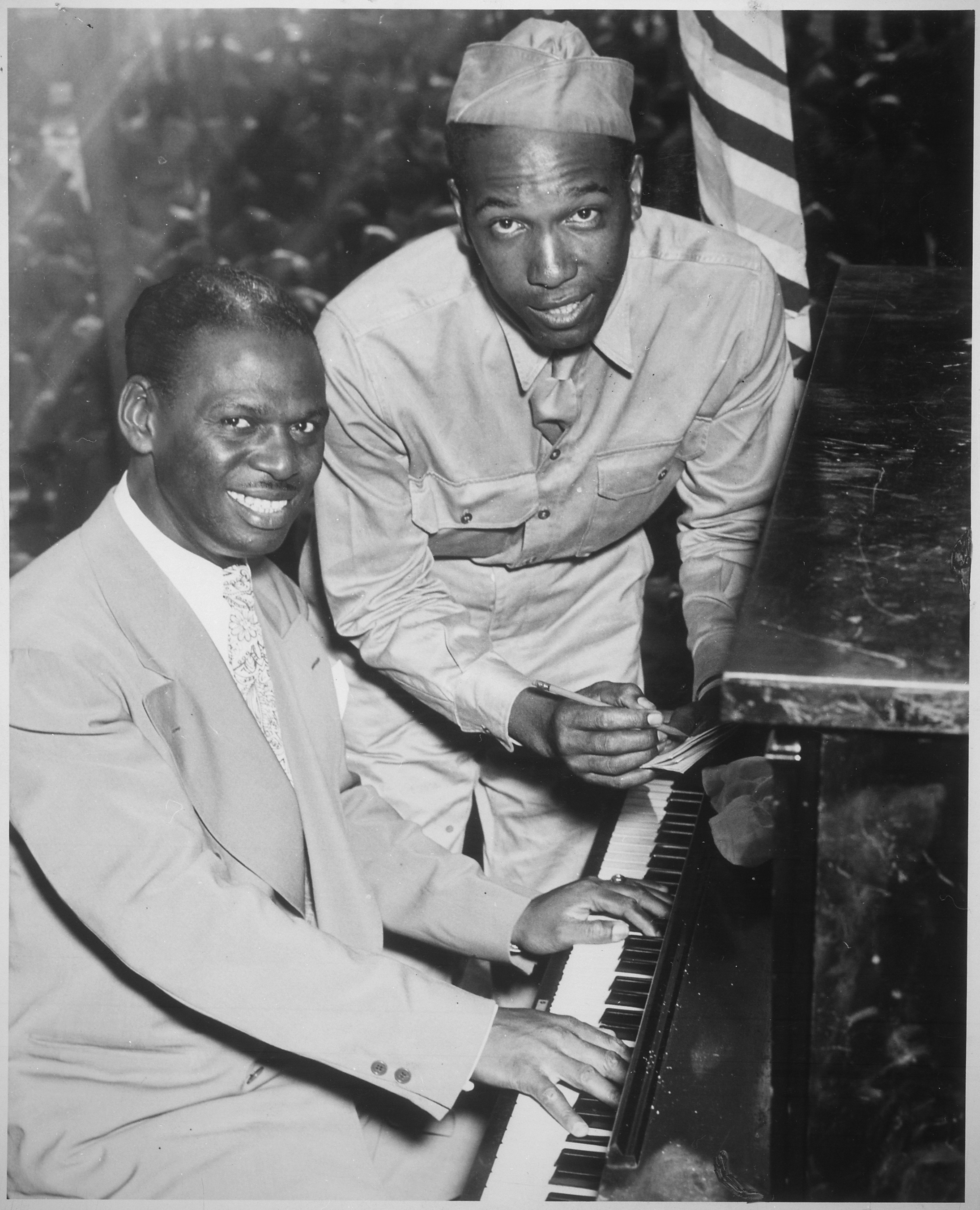
Hines with Pvt. Charles Carpenter, former manager of the Hines orchestra

In 1942, Hines provided the saxophonist Charlie Parker with his big break, although Parker was subsequently fired soon after for his "time-keeping" – by which Hines meant his inability to show up on time – despite Parker resorting to sleeping under the band stage in his attempts to be punctual. Dizzie Gillespie joined the same year.

The Grand Terrace Cafe had closed suddenly in December 1940; its manager, Ed Fox, disappeared. The 37-year-old Hines, always famously good to work for, took his band on the road full-time for the next eight years, (Note: For their coast-coast schedule over the next eight years, see Dance 1983, pp. 299–334.) resisting renewed offers from Benny Goodman to join his band as piano player.

Hines's band encountered trouble when several of its members were drafted into the armed forces in World War II. (Note: Hines himself was only just outside draftable age. On 5 December 1942, a Presidential Executive Order changed the age range for the Draft from 21-45 to 18-38 (3 weeks after the Order, on December 28 Hines was 39) and ended voluntary enlistment. See Conscription in the United States.) Six were drafted in 1943 alone. As a result, on August 19, 1943, Hines had to cancel the rest of his Southern tour. He went to New York and hired a "draft-proof" 12-piece all-woman group, which lasted two months. Next, Hines expanded it into a 28-piece band (17 men, 11 women), including strings and French horn. Despite these wartime difficulties, Hines took his bands on tour from coast to coast, but was still able to take time out from his own band to front the Duke Ellington Orchestra in 1944 when Ellington fell ill.

It was during this time (and especially during the recording ban during the 1942–44 musicians' strike) that late-night jam sessions with members of Hines's band sowed the seeds for the emerging new style in jazz, bebop. Ellington later said that "the seeds of bop were in Earl Hines's piano style". Charlie Parker's biographer Ross Russell wrote:

The Earl Hines Orchestra of 1942 had been infiltrated by the jazz revolutionaries. Each section had its cell of insurgents. The band's sonority bristled with flatted fifths, off triplets and other material of the new sound scheme. Fellow bandleaders of a more conservative bent warned Hines that he had recruited much too well and was sitting on a powder keg.

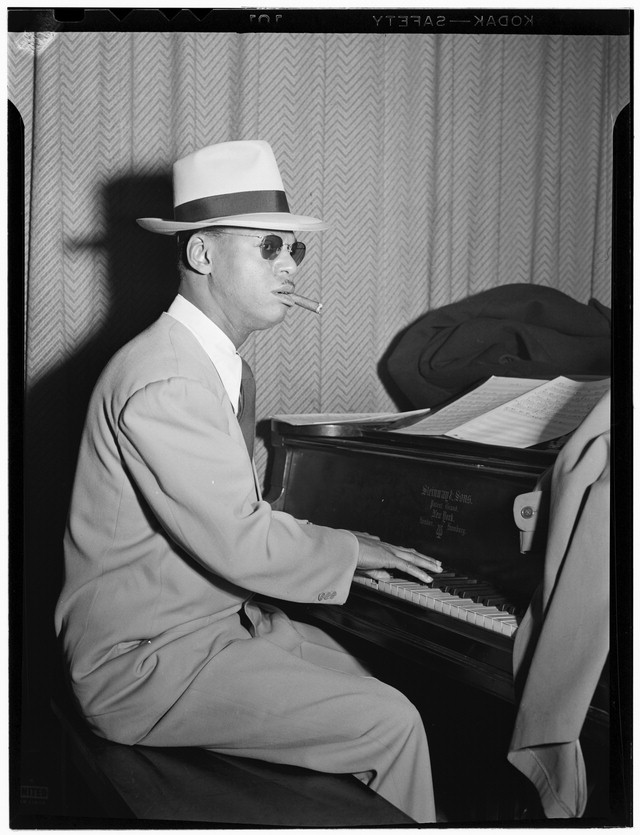
Hines in 1947 (photograph by William P. Gottlieb)

As early as 1940, saxophone player and arranger Budd Johnson had "re-written the book" for Hines's band in a more modern style. Johnson and Billy Eckstine, Hines's vocalist between 1939 and 1943, have been credited with helping to bring modern players into the Hines band in the transition between swing and bebop. Apart from Parker and Gillespie, other Hines 'modernists' included Gene Ammons, Gail Brockman, Scoops Carry, Goon Gardner, Wardell Gray, Bennie Green, Benny Harris, Harry 'Pee-Wee' Jackson, Shorty McConnell, Cliff Smalls, Shadow Wilson and Sarah Vaughan, who replaced Eckstine as the band singer in 1943 and stayed for a year.

Dizzy Gillespie said of the music the band evolved:

People talk about the Hines band being 'the incubator of bop' and the leading exponents of that music ended up in the Hines band. But people also have the erroneous impression that the music was new. It was not. The music evolved from what went before. It was the same basic music. The difference was in how you got from here to here to here ... naturally each age has got its own shit.

The links to bebop remained close. Parker's discographer, among others, has argued that "Yardbird Suite", which Parker recorded with Miles Davis in March 1946, was in fact based on Hines's "Rosetta", which nightly served as the Hines band theme-tune.

Dizzy Gillespie described the Hines band, saying, "We had a beautiful, beautiful band with Earl Hines. He's a master and you learn a lot from him, self-discipline and organization."

In July 1946, Hines suffered serious head injuries in a car crash near Houston which, despite an operation, affected his eyesight for the rest of his life. Back on the road again four months later, he continued to lead his big band for two more years. In 1947, Hines bought the biggest nightclub in Chicago, The El Grotto, but with the declining popularity of big-band music, it soon foundered and Hines lost $30,000 ($495,307 today).

=== Rediscovery ===
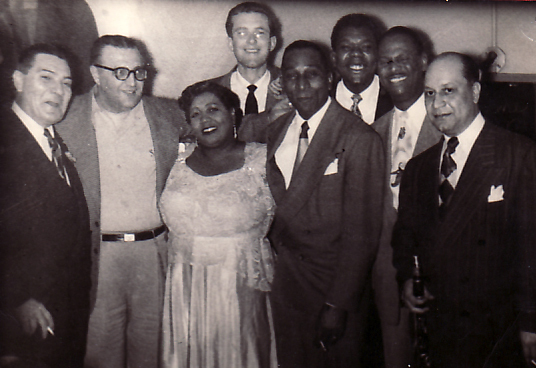
From left: Jack Teagarden, Sandy DeSantis, Velma Middleton, Fraser MacPherson, Cozy Cole, Arvell Shaw, Earl Hines, Barney Bigard at the Palomar Supper Club, Vancouver, B.C., March 17, 1951

In early 1948, Hines joined up again with Armstrong in the "Louis Armstrong and His All-Stars" "small-band". It was not without its strains for Hines. A year later, Armstrong became the first jazz musician to appear on the cover of Time magazine (on February 21, 1949). Armstrong was by then on his way to becoming an American icon, leaving Hines to feel he was being used only as a sideman in comparison to his old friend. Discussing the difficulties, mainly over billing, Armstrong stated, "Hines and his ego, ego, ego ..." Three years later and to Armstrong's annoyance, Hines left the All Stars in 1951.

Next, back as leader again, Hines took his own small combos around the United States. He started with a markedly more modern lineup than the aging All Stars: Bennie Green, Art Blakey, Tommy Potter, and Etta Jones. In 1954, he toured his then seven-piece group nationwide with the Harlem Globetrotters. In 1958, he broadcast on the American Forces Network but by the start of the jazz-lean 1960s, the aging Hines settled "home" in Oakland, California, with his wife and two young daughters, opened a tobacconist's, and came close to giving up the profession.

In 1964, Stanley Dance, Hines's determined friend and unofficial manager, convinced Hines to perform a series of recitals at the Little Theatre in New York. They were the first piano recitals Hines had ever given; they caused a sensation, leading Hines to be "suddenly rediscovered". "What is there left to hear after you've heard Earl Hines?", asked John Wilson of The New York Times. Hines then won the 1966 International Critics Poll for DownBeat magazine's Hall of Fame. DownBeat also elected him the world's "No. 1 Jazz Pianist" in 1966 (and did so again five more times). Jazz Journal awarded his LPs of the year first and second places in its overall poll and first, second and third in its piano category. Jazz voted him "Jazzman of the Year" and picked him for its number 1 and number 2 places in the category Piano Recordings. Hines was invited to appear on TV shows hosted by Johnny Carson and Mike Douglas.

From then until his death twenty years later, Hines recorded endlessly, both solo and with contemporaries like Cat Anderson, Harold Ashby, Barney Bigard, Lawrence Brown, Dave Brubeck (they recorded duets in 1975), Jaki Byard (duets in 1972), Benny Carter, Buck Clayton, Cozy Cole, Wallace Davenport, Eddie "Lockjaw" Davis, Vic Dickenson, Roy Eldridge, Duke Ellington (duets in 1966), Ella Fitzgerald, Panama Francis, Bud Freeman, Stan Getz, (Note: Hines played on a New Orleans-Cuba cruise with Getz, Gillespie & Ry Cooder in 1977 and performed there with Cuban musicians in the early days of the USA & Cuba "thaw".) Dizzy Gillespie, Paul Gonsalves, Stéphane Grappelli, Sonny Greer, Lionel Hampton, Coleman Hawkins, Milt Hinton, Johnny Hodges, Peanuts Hucko, Helen Humes, Budd Johnson, Jonah Jones, Max Kaminsky, Gene Krupa, Ellis Larkins, Shelly Manne, Marian McPartland (duets in 1970), Gerry Mulligan, Ray Nance, Oscar Peterson (duets in 1968), Russell Procope, Pee Wee Russell, Jimmy Rushing, Stuff Smith, Rex Stewart, Maxine Sullivan, Buddy Tate, Jack Teagarden, Clark Terry, Sarah Vaughan, Joe Venuti, Earle Warren, Ben Webster, Teddy Wilson (duets in 1965 and 1970), Jimmy Witherspoon, Jimmy Woode and Lester Young. Possibly more surprising were Alvin Batiste, Tony Bennett, Art Blakey, Teresa Brewer, Barbara Dane, Richard Davis, Elvin Jones, Etta Jones, the Ink Spots, Peggy Lee, Helen Merrill, Charles Mingus, Oscar Pettiford, Vi Redd, Betty Roché, Caterina Valente, Dinah Washington, and Ry Cooder (on the song "Ditty Wah Ditty").

But the most highly regarded recordings of this period are his solo performances, "a whole orchestra by himself". Whitney Balliett wrote of his solo recordings and performances of this time:

Hines will be sixty-seven this year and his style has become involuted, rococo, and subtle to the point of elusiveness. It unfolds in orchestral layers and it demands intense listening. Despite the sheer mass of notes he now uses, his playing is never fatty. Hines may go along like this in a medium tempo blues. He will play the first two choruses softly and out of tempo, unreeling placid chords that safely hold the kernel of the melody. By the third chorus, he will have slid into a steady but implied beat and raised his volume. Then, using steady tenths in his left hand, he will stamp out a whole chorus of right-hand chords in between beats. He will vault into the upper register in the next chorus and wind through irregularly placed notes, while his left hand plays descending, on-the-beat, chords that pass through a forest of harmonic changes. (There are so many push-me, pull-you contrasts going on in such a chorus that it is impossible to grasp it one time through.) In the next chorus—bang!—up goes the volume again and Hines breaks into a crazy-legged double-time-and-a-half run that may make several sweeps up and down the keyboard and that are punctuated by offbeat single notes in the left hand. Then he will throw in several fast descending two-fingered glissandos, go abruptly into an arrhythmic swirl of chords and short, broken, runs and, as abruptly as he began it all, ease into an interlude of relaxed chords and poling single notes. But these choruses, which may be followed by eight or ten more before Hines has finished what he has to say, are irresistible in other ways. Each is a complete creation in itself, and yet each is lashed tightly to the next.

Hines recorded solo tributes to Armstrong, Hoagy Carmichael, Ellington, George Gershwin and Cole Porter in the 1970s, sometimes on the 1904 12-legged Steinway given to him in 1969 by Scott Newhall, the managing editor of the San Francisco Chronicle. In 1974, when he was in his seventies, Hines recorded sixteen LPs. "A spate of solo recording meant that, in his old age, Hines was being comprehensively documented at last, and he rose to the challenge with consistent inspirational force". From his 1964 "comeback" until his death, Hines recorded over 100 LPs all over the world. Within the industry, he became legendary for going into a studio and coming out an hour and a half later having recorded an unplanned solo LP. Retakes were almost unheard of except when Hines wanted to try a tune again in some other way, often completely different.

From 1964 on, Hines often toured Europe, especially France. He toured South America in 1968. He performed in Asia, Australia, Japan and, in 1966, the Soviet Union, in tours funded by the U.S. State Department. During his six-week tour of the Soviet Union, in which he performed 35 concerts, the 10,000-seat Kyiv Sports Palace was sold out. As a result, the Kremlin cancelled his Moscow and Leningrad concerts as being "too culturally dangerous".

=== Final years ===
Arguably still playing as well as he ever had, (Note: Charles Fox writing in The Essential Jazz Records, Vol 1 said of Tour de Force (solo recording from 1972), "The pianist was still at his dazzling best when he made this LP at the age of 69. This is Hines in excelsis, sounding as good as at any time in his long career". (p. 487) Writing about Hines's July 3, 1974 Concert at the Royal Festival Hall in London, Derek Jewell wrote in Britain's Sunday Times: "The packed house must have regarded his opening unaccompanied solo as one of the greatest jazz experiences of their lives." Hines was then 70 years old.) Hines displayed individualistic quirks (including grunts) in these performances. He sometimes sang as he played, especially his own "They Didn't Believe I Could Do It ... Neither Did I". In 1975, Hines was the subject of an hour-long television documentary film made by ATV (for Britain's commercial ITV channel), out-of-hours at the Blues Alley nightclub in Washington, DC. The International Herald Tribune described it as "the greatest jazz film ever made". In the film, Hines said, "The way I like to play is that ... I'm an explorer, if I might use that expression, I'm looking for something all the time ... almost like I'm trying to talk." In 1979, Hines was inducted into the Black Filmmakers Hall of Fame. He played solo at Duke Ellington's funeral, played solo twice at the White House, for the President of France and for the Pope. Of this acclaim, Hines said, "Usually they give people credit when they're dead. I got my flowers while I was living".

Hines's last show took place in San Francisco a few days before he died of a heart attack in Oakland. As he had wished, his Steinway was auctioned for the benefit of gifted low-income music students, still bearing its silver plaque:

presented by jazz lovers from all over the world. this piano is the only one of its kind in the world and expresses the great genius of a man who has never played a melancholy note in his lifetime on a planet that has often succumbed to despair.

Hines was buried in Evergreen Cemetery in Oakland, California.

== Style ==
The Oxford Companion to Jazz describes Hines as "the most important pianist in the transition from stride to swing" and continues:

As he matured through the 1920s, he simplified the stride "orchestral piano", eventually arriving at a prototypical swing style. The right hand no longer developed syncopated patterns around pivot notes (as in ragtime) or between-the-hands figuration (as in stride) but instead focused on a more directed melodic line, often doubled at the octave with phrase-ending tremolos. This line was called the "trumpet" right hand because of its markedly hornlike character but in fact the general trend toward a more linear style can be traced back through stride and Jelly Roll Morton to late ragtime from 1915 to 1920.

Hines himself described meeting Armstrong:

Louis looked at me so peculiar. So I said, "Am I making the wrong chords?" And he said, "No, but your style is like mine". So I said, "Well, I wanted to play trumpet but it used to hurt me behind my ears so I played on the piano what I wanted to play on the trumpet". And he said, "No, no, that's my style, that's what I like."

Hines continued:

... I was curious and wanted to know what the chords were made of. I would begin to play like the other instruments. But in those days we didn't have amplification, so the singers used to use megaphones and they didn't have grand-pianos for us to use at the time – it was an upright. So when they gave me a solo, playing single fingers like I was doing, in those great big halls they could hardly hear me. So I had to think of something so I could cut through the big-band. So I started to use what they call 'trumpet-style' – which was octaves. Then they could hear me out front and that's what changed the style of piano playing at that particular time.

In their book Jazz (2009), Gary Giddins and Scott DeVeaux wrote of Hines's style of the time:

To make [himself] audible, [Hines] developed an ability to improvise in tremolos (the speedy alternation of two or more notes, creating a pianistic version of the brass man's vibrato) and octaves or tenths: instead of hitting one note at a time with his right hand, he hit two and with vibrantly percussive force – his reach was so large that jealous competitors spread the ludicrous rumor that he had had the webbing between his fingers surgically removed.

In his book Louis Armstrong: Master of Modernism, Thomas Brothers described Hines's style:

Rhythmically, Hines was very good at taking his melodic lines further and further way from the fixed foundation, creating a radical sense of detachment for a few beats or measures, only to land back in time with great aplomb when finished with his foray. The left hand sometimes joins in the action...What is especially distinctive about Hines are the startling effects he creates by harmonically enhancing these rhythmic departures. Like Armstrong, he thought of chords creatively and with great precision. But he was a step ahead of his colleague in his willingness to experiment. He became fond of radical dislocations, sudden turns of directions with dim and nonexistent connection to the ground harmony.

Pianist Teddy Wilson wrote of Hines's style:

Hines was both a great soloist and a great rhythm player. He has a beautiful powerful rhythmic approach to the keyboard and his rhythms are more eccentric than those of Art Tatum or Fats Waller. When I say eccentric, I mean getting away from straight 4/4 rhythm. He would play a lot of what we now call 'accent on the and beat'. ... It was a subtle use of syncopation, playing on the in-between beats or what I might call and beats: one-and-two-and-three-and-four-and. The and between "one-two-three-four" is implied, When counted in music, the and becomes what are called eighth notes. So you get eight notes to a bar instead of four, although they're spaced out in the time of four. Hines would come in on those and beats with the most eccentric patterns that propelled the rhythm forward with such tremendous force that people felt an irresistible urge to dance or tap their feet or otherwise react physically to the rhythm of the music. ... Hines is very intricate in his rhythm patterns: very unusual and original and there is really nobody like him. That makes him a giant of originality. He could produce improvised piano solos which could cut through to perhaps 2,000 dancing people just like a trumpet or a saxophone could.

Oliver Jackson was Hines's frequent drummer (as well as a drummer for Oscar Peterson, Benny Goodman, Lionel Hampton, Duke Ellington, Teddy Wilson and many others. He described Hines's style as follows:

Jackson says that Earl Hines and Erroll Garner (whose approach to playing piano, he says, came from Hines) were the two musicians he found exceptionally difficult to accompany. Why? “They could play in like two or three different tempos at one time … The left hand would be in one meter and the right hand would be in another meter and then you have to watch their pedal technique because they would hit the sustaining pedal and notes are ringing here and that’s one tempo going on when he puts the sustaining pedal on, and then this hand is moving, his left hand is moving, maybe playing tenths, and this hand is playing like quarter-note triplets or sixteenth notes. So you got this whole conglomeration of all these different tempos going on”.

The Biographical Encyclopedia of Jazz gives the following description of Hines's 1965 style:

[Hines] uses his left hand sometimes for accents and figures that would only come from a full trumpet section. Sometimes he will play chords that would have been written and played by five saxophones in harmony. But he is always the virtuoso pianist with his arpeggios, his percussive attack and his fantastic ability to modulate from one song to another as if they were all one song and he just created all those melodies during his own improvisation.

Later still, then in his seventies and after a host of recent solo recordings, Hines himself said:

I'm an explorer if I might use that expression. I'm looking for something all the time. And oft-times I get lost. And people that are around me a lot know that when they see me smiling, they know I'm lost and I'm trying to get back. But it makes it much more interesting because then you do things that surprise yourself. And after you hear the recording, it makes you a little bit happy too because you say, "Oh, I didn't know I could do THAT!"

== Discography ==
(The below is confined to discs from the LP era that began c.1950. Hines made many 78 recordings over the preceding years, his first in 1923)

- Earl Hines (Columbia, 1951)
- Fats Waller Songs (Brunswick, 1952)
- "Earl Hines Volume Two" (Dial, 1953)
- Louis Armstrong and His Hot Five with Earl Hines (Odeon, 1954)
- Fatha Plays Fats (Fantasy, 1956)
- Solo (America, 1956)
- Oh, "Father"! (Epic, 1956)
- The Incomparable Earl "Fatha" Hines (Tops, 1957)
- The Earl Hines Trio (Epic, 1958)
- Earl Hines (Philips, 1958)
- Earl's Pearls (MGM, 1960)
- A Monday Date (Riverside, 1961)
- Earl "Fatha" Hines (Capitol, 1963)
- Spontaneous Explorations (Contact, 1964)
- Up to Date with Earl Hines (RCA Victor, 1965)
- Paris Session (Columbia, 1965)
- The Real Earl Hines Recorded Live! in Concert (Focus, 1965)
- Once Upon a Time (Impulse!, 1966)
- Stride Right with Johnny Hodges (Verve, 1966)
- Here Comes Earl "Fatha" Hines (Contact, 1966)
- Dinah (RCA Victor, 1966)
- The Great Earl Hines (Polydor, 1966)
- Blues in Thirds (Fontana, 1966)
- Jazz Meanz Hines! (Fontana, 1967)
- Swing's Our Thing with Johnny Hodges (Verve, 1968)
- Blues & Things with Jimmy Rushing (Master Jazz, 1968)
- The Incomparable Earl "Fatha" Hines (Fantasy, 1968)
- "Fatha" Blows Best (Decca, 1968)
- Earl Hines at Home (Delmark, 1969)
- Earl Fatha Hines (Everest, 1970)
- The Quintessential Recording Session (Halycon, 1970)
- Fatha & His Flock on Tour (MPS, 1970)
- Live at the Overseas Press Club with Maxine Sullivan (Chiaroscuro, 1970)
- All Star Jazz Session (Springboard, 1970)
- Tea for Two (Black Lion, 1971)
- Earl Hines Plays Duke Ellington (Master Jazz, 1971)
- Hines Does Hoagy (Audiophile, 1971)
- My Tribute to Louis (Audiophile, 1971)
- Comes in Handy (Audiophile, 1971)
- Hines Plays Hines (Swaggie, 1972)
- Earl Hines (GNP Crescendo, 1972)
- The Mighty Fatha (Flying Dutchman, 1973)
- Tour de Force (Black Lion, 1972)
- Quintessential Continued (Chiaroscuro, 1973)
- Earl Hines Plays George Gershwin (1973)
- Earl Hines at Sundown (Black and Blue, 1974)
- It Don't Mean a Thing If It Ain't Got That Swing! with Paul Gonsalves (Black Lion, 1974)
- Earl Hines Plays Cole Porter (Swaggie, 1974)
- Hines '74 (Black & Blue, 1974)
- Quintessential '74 (Chiaroscuro, 1974)
- Another Monday Date (Prestige, 1974)
- Earl Hines in New Orleans Vol. 1 (Up, 1975)
- Tour de Force Encore (Black Lion, 1975)
- Earl Hines in New Orleans Vol. 2 (1975)
- Duet! (MPS, 1975) – with Jaki Byard
- West Side Story (Black Lion, 1975)
- At the Village Vanguard with Roy Eldridge (Xanadu, 1975)
- Fireworks (RCA, 1975)
- Earl Hines at Club Hangover Vol. 5 (Storyville, 1976)
- Hot Sonatas with Joe Venuti (Chiaroscuro, 1976)
- Live at Buffalo (Improv, 1976)
- Earl Hines at Saralee's (Fairmont, 1976)
- Earl Hines in New Orleans (Chiaroscuro, 1977)
- Lionel Hampton Presents Earl Hines (Who's Who in Jazz, 1977)
- The Giants with Stephane Grappelli (Black Lion, 1977)
- An Evening with Earl Hines ("Live at Dinklers Motor Inn") (Chiaroscuro, 1977)
- Live at the New School (Chiaroscuro, 1977)
- Solo Walk in Tokyo (Biography, 1977)
- Swingin' Away (Black Lion, 1977)
- Jazz Is His Old Lady...and My Old Man with Marva Josie (Catalyst, 1977)
- Earl Meets Harry (Black and Blue, 1978)
- One for My Baby (Black Lion, 1978)
- The Dirty Old Men (Black and Blue, 1978)
- Earl Fatha Hines and His All Stars (GNP Crescendo, 1978)
- We Love You Fats with Teresa Brewer (Doctor Jazz, 1978)
- Partners in Jazz with Jaki Byard (MPS, 1978)
- Linger Awhile (Bluebird, 1979)
- The Indispensable Earl Hines Vol. 1 and 2 (RCA, 1979)
- The Indispensable Earl Hines Vol. 3 and 4 (RCA, 1981)
- Deep Forest (Black Lion, 1982)
- The Legendary Little Theater Concert of 1964 Vols. 1 & 2 (Muse, 1983)
- Texas Ruby Red (Black Lion, 1983)
- Fatha (Quicksilver, 1983)
- Live and in Living Jazz (Quicksilver, 1983)
- Earl Hines and His Esquire All Stars Featuring Dicky Wells (Storyville, 1985)
- Varieties! (Xanadu, 1985)
- Earl's Backroom and Cozy's Caravan (Felsted, 1986)
- Live at the Village Vanguard (Columbia, 1988)
- Earl Hines Plays Duke Ellington (1988)
- Reunion in Brussels (Red Baron, 1992)
- Earl Hines and the Duke's Men (Delmark, 1994)
- Live Aalborg Denmark 1965 (Storyville, 1994)
- Grand Reunion (Verve, 1995)
- Earl Hines Plays Duke Ellington Volume Two (1997)
- Classic Earl Hines Sessions 1928-1943 (Mosaic Records, 2012)
