= Kenny Barron discography =

This is the discography for American jazz musician Kenny Barron.

== Albums ==
=== As leader/co-leader ===
Recording date	Album title	Label	Year released	Personnel / Notes
1967–01	You Had Better Listen	Atlantic	1967	Kenny Barron / Jimmy Owens Quintet: with Bennie Maupin, Chris White, Freddie Waits, Rudy Collins
1973–04	Sunset to Dawn	Muse	1973	Kenny Barron / Jimmy Owens Quintet: with Bennie Maupin, Chris White, Freddie Waits, Rudy Collins
1974–03	Peruvian Blue	Muse	1974	Ted Dunbar, David Williams, Albert "Tootie" Heath, Richard Landrum, Sonny Morgan
1975–02	In Tandem	Muse	1980	Live. Co-led with Ted Dunbar.
1975–04	Lucifer	Muse	1975	Carlos Alomar, Bill Barron, Billy Hart, James Spaulding, Charles Sullivan, Chris White
1978	Innocence	Wolf	1978	Sonny Fortune, Jimmy Owens, Buster Williams, Gary King, Ben Riley, Brian Brake, Billy Hart, Rafael Cruz, produced by Joel Dorn
1978–12	Together	Denon	1979	Co-led with Tommy Flanagan
1980–04	Golden Lotus	Muse	1982	John Stubblefield, Steve Nelson
1981–02	Kenny Barron at the Piano	Xanadu	1982	Solo piano
1982–06	Imo Live	Whynot	1983	Live. Buster Williams, Ben Riley.
1982–06	Green Chimneys	Criss Cross Jazz	1984	Live. Buster Williams, Ben Riley. 1988 reissue includes 6 bonus tracks recorded in 1987.
1982–06	Spiral	Baybridge	1982	Solo piano
1984–04	1+1+1	Black Hawk	1986	Ron Carter, Michael Moore
1984–10	Landscape	Baystate	1985	Cecil McBee, Al Foster
1984–12	Autumn in New York [LP] / reissued in 1996 as New York Attitude [CD]	Uptown	1985	Rufus Reid, Freddie Waits. 1996 reissue includes 3 bonus tracks.
1985–03	Scratch	Enja	1985	Dave Holland, Daniel Humair
1986–02	What If?	Enja	1986	Wallace Roney, John Stubblefield, Cecil McBee, Victor Lewis
1986–06	Two as One	Red	1987	Live. Co-led with Buster Williams.
1986–06	The Red Barron Duo	Storyville	1988	Co-led with Red Mitchell
1988–01	Live at Fat Tuesdays	Enja	1988	Live. Cecil McBee, Victor Lewis, John Stubblefield, Eddie Henderson.
1989–09	Rhythm-a-Ning	Candid	1990	John Hicks
1990–03	The Artistry of Kenny Barron	Wave	1998	With Peter Ind, Mark Taylor
1990–06	The Only One	Reservoir	1990	Ray Drummond, Ben Riley
1990–12	Live at Maybeck Recital Hall, Volume Ten	Concord Jazz	1991	Live. Solo piano.
1990–12	Invitation	Criss Cross	1991	Ralph Moore, David Williams, Lewis Nash
1991–01	Lemuria-Seascape	Candid	1991	Ray Drummond, Ben Riley
1991–02	Quickstep	Enja	1991	John Stubblefield, Eddie Henderson, David Williams, Victor Lewis,
1991–08	But Beautiful	SteepleChase	1991	Co-led with Joe Locke
1991–08	The Moment	Reservoir	1992	Trio with Victor Lewis, Rufus Reid
1991–09	Confirmation	Candid	1992	Live. Co-led qualtet with Barry Harris, with Ray Drummond, Ben Riley.
1992–05	Sambao	Verve	1992	Toninho Horta, Victor Lewis, Nico Assumpção, Mino Cinelu
1993–02	Other Places	Verve	1993	Mino Cinelu, Bobby Hutcherson, Victor Lewis, Ralph Moore, Rufus Reid
1994–02	Wanton Spirit	Verve	1994	With Roy Haynes, Charlie Haden
1995–03	Things Unseen	Verve	1997	Eddie Henderson, John Scofield, John Stubblefield
1995–08	Swamp Sally	Verve	1996	Co-led duo with Mino Cinelu
1995–08-12	So Many Lovely Things: Live in Brecon	Essential	2026	Ray Drummond, bass, and Ben Riley, drums
1996–04	Live at Bradley's	EmArcy	2001	Live. Trio with Ray Drummond, Ben Riley.
1996–04	Live at Bradley's II	Sunnyside	2005	Live. Trio with Ray Drummond, Ben Riley.
1996–09	Night and the City	Verve	1998	Co-led duo with Charlie Haden
1999–03	Spirit Song	Verve	2000	David Sanchez, Eddie Henderson, Russell Malone, Rufus Reid, Billy Hart, Michael Wall Grigsby, Regina Carter
2000–12	Freefall	Verve	2001	Co-led by Regina Carter
2002–02	Canta Brasil	Sunnyside	2002	Trio da Paz, Anne Drummond, Valtinho Anastacio, Maúcha Adnet
2003?	Peace	DIW	2003	Co-led with George Robert
2003–10	Images	Sunnyside	2004	Quintet with Stefon Harris, Anne Drummond, Kimberly Thompson, Kiyoshi Kitagawa
2004?	A Table for Two	Menus and Music	2004	Ensemble with Bob Sheppard, Dave Ellis, Peter Barshay, Lewis Nash
2004–09	Super Standard	Tokuma	2004	Super Trio with Jay Leonhart, Al Foster
2007–12	The Traveler	Sunnyside	2008	Kiyoshi Kitagawa, Francisco Mela, Steve Wilson, Lionel Loueke
2009–05	Minor Blues	Venus	2009	George Mraz, Ben Riley
2012–06	Kenny Barron & the Brazilian Knights	Sunnyside	2013	Mauricio Einhorn, Idriss Boudrioua, Lula Galvao, Sergio Barroso, Rafael Barata, Claudio Roditi
2014–03	The Art of Conversation	Impulse!	2014	Co-led with Dave Holland
2014–11	Interplay	Chesky	2015	Co-led with Mark Sherman
2015–07	Book of Intuition	Impulse!	2016	Kiyoshi Kitagawa (bass), Johnathan Blake (drums)
2017–03	Concentric Circles	Blue Note	2018	Quintet with Kiyoshi Kitagawa (bass), Johnathan Blake (drums), Mike Rodriguez (trumpet, flugelhorn), Dayna Stephens (tenor sax, soprano sax)
2019–08	Without Deception	Dare2	2020	Co-led with Dave Holland. Trio with Dave Holland (bass), Johnathan Blake (drums).
2022–07	The Source	Artwork	2023	Solo piano
2023–02	Beyond This Place	Artwork	2024	Immanuel Wilkins (alto saxophone), Steve Nelson (vibraphone), Kiyoshi Kitagawa (bass), Johnathan Blake (drums)
2025–01, 2005–03, 2005–04	Songbook	Artwork	2025	Kiyoshi Kitagawa (bass), Johnathan Blake (drums), various vocalists (lyrics by Janice Jarrett, Catherine Russell)

=== As a member ===
The Classical Jazz Quartet

- Tchaikovsky's The Nutcracker (Vertical Jazz, 2001)
- The Classical Jazz Quartet Play Bach (Vertical Jazz, 2002)
- The Classical Jazz Quartet Play Rachmaninov (Kind of Blue, 2006) – rec. 2002

Sphere

- Four in One (Elektra/Musician, 1982)
- Flight Path (Elektra/Musician, 1983)
- Sphere on Tour (Red, 1985)
- Four for All (Verve, 1987)
- Bird Songs (Verve, 1988)
- Pumpkin's Delight (Red, 1993) – rec. 1986
- Sphere (Verve, 1997)

The Candid Jazz Masters

- For Miles (Candid, 1995) – rec. 1991

The Super Premium Band

- Softly, as in a Morning Sunrise (Happinet, 2010)
- Sounds of New York (Happinet, 2011)

=== As sideman ===
With Chet Baker

- You Can't Go Home Again (Horizon, 1977)
- Studio Trieste with Jim Hall and Hubert Laws (CTI, 1982)
- The Best Thing for You (A&M, 1989) – rec. 1977
- But Not For Me (Stash, 1994) – rec. 1982

With Bill Barron

- The Tenor Stylings of Bill Barron (Savoy, 1961)
- Modern Windows (Savoy, 1961)
- The Brasileros – Bossa Nova (Diplomat, 1963)
- West Side Story Bossa Nova (Dauntless, 1963)
- Now, Hear This! with Ted Curson (Audio Fidelity, 1963)
- Hot Line (Savoy, 1964) – rec. 1962
- Motivation (Savoy, 1972)
- Jazz Caper (Muse, 1982) – rec. 1978
- Variations in Blue (Muse, 1983)
- The Next Plateau (Muse, 1989) – rec. 1987
- Higher Ground (Joken, 1989)
- Live at Cobi's 2 (SteepleChase, 2006) – rec. 1985

With Gary Bartz

- There Goes The Neighborhood (Candid, 1990)
- Alto Memories with Sonny Fortune (Verve, 1993)

With Sathima Bea Benjamin

- Windsong (Ekapa/BlackHawk, 1985)
- Southern Touch (Enja, 1992) – rec. 1989

With Cheryl Bentyne

- Talk of the Town (Telarc, 2004) – rec. 2002
- Cheryl Bentyne Sings Waltz for Debby (King, 2004)

With Cindy Blackman

- Code Red (Muse, 1992) – rec. 1990
- The Oracle (Muse, 1995)

With Joshua Breakstone

- 4/4 = 1 (Sonora, 1985)
- Echoes (Contemporary, 1987)
- Self-Portrait in Swing (Contemporary, 1989)
- Walk Don't Run (King, 1992)
- Sittin' On the Thing With Ming (Capri, 1993)
- Remembering Grant Green (Evidence, 1996) – rec. 1983

With Teresa Brewer

- Memories of Louis (Red Baron, 1991)
- Softly I Swing (Red Baron, 1991)

With Nick Brignola

- Raincheck (Reservoir, 1988)
- On a Different Level (Reservoir, 1989)
- What It Takes (Reservoir, 1990)
- It's Time (Reservoir, 1992)
- Flight of the Eagle (Reservoir, 1996)

With Ann Hampton Callaway

- After Ours (Denon, 1997) – rec. 1994
- Easy Living (Sin-Drome, 1999) – Barron plays on 2 tracks
- Signature (After 9, 2001)

With Ron Carter

- Yellow & Green (CTI, 1976)
- Pastels (Milestone, 1976)
- Piccolo (Milestone, 1977)
- Peg Leg (Milestone, 1977)
- A Song for You (Milestone, 1978)
- New York Slick (Milestone, 1979)
- Pick 'Em (Milestone, 1980) – rec. 1978
- Patrão (Milestone, 1980)
- Super Strings (Milestone, 1981)
- Friends (Blue Note, 1993)
- Jazz, My Romance (Blue Note, 1994)
- So What? (Blue Note, 1998)

With Ed Cherry

- First Take (Groovin' High, 1993)
- A Second Look (Groovin' High, 1997) – rec. 1994

With Ray Drummond

- Camera in a Bag (Criss Cross, 1990)
- Continuum (Arabesque, 1994)

With Booker Ervin

- Booker 'n' Brass (Pacific Jazz, 1967)
- Tex Book Tenor (Blue Note, 1968)

With Jon Faddis

- Youngblood (Pablo, 1976)
- Legacy (Concord Jazz, 1985)

With Sonny Fortune

- Awakening (Horizon, 1975)
- Serengeti Minstrel (Atlantic, 1977)
- Laying It Down (Konnex, 1984)
- A Better Understanding (Blue Note, 1995)

With Frank Foster and Frank Wess

- Two for the Blues (Pablo, 1984)
- Frankly Speaking (Concord, 1985)

With Chico Freeman

- Fathers and Sons with Von Freeman (Columbia, 1982)
- The Search (India Navigation, 1983) – rec. 1980
- Groovin' Late (Jazz Road, 1986)
- Freeman & Freeman with Von Freeman (India Navigation, 1989) – rec. 1981

With Stan Getz

- Voyage (BlackHawk, 1986)
- Anniversary! (Emarcy, 1989) – rec. 1987
- Apasionado (A&M, 1989)
- Serenity (Emarcy, 1991) – rec. 1987
- People Time: The Complete Recordings (EmArcy, 1992)[2CD] –rec. 1991
- Yours and Mine (Concord, 1996) – rec. 1989
- Soul Eyes (Concord, 1997) – rec. 1989
- The Final Concert Recording (Eagle, 2000) – rec. 1990
- Bossas & Ballads – The Lost Sessions (Verve, 2003) – rec. 1989

With Gerry Gibbs

- Gerry Gibbs Thrasher Dream Trio (Whaling City Sound, 2014)
- We're Back (Whaling City Sound, 2014)

With Dizzy Gillespie

- Something Old, Something New (Philips, 1963)
- Dizzy Gillespie and the Double Six of Paris (Philips, 1963)
- Dizzy Goes Hollywood (Philips, 1963)
- The Cool World (Philips, 1964)
- Jambo Caribe (Limelight, 1964)
- I/We Had a Ball (Limelight, 1965) - 1 track
- Charlie Parker 10th Memorial Concert (Limelight, 1965)
- The Melody Lingers On (Limelight, 1966)

With Tom Harrell

- Look to the Sky with John McNeil (SteepleChase, 1979)
- Moon Alley (Criss Cross Jazz, 1985)

With Louis Hayes

- Light and Lively (SteepleChase, 1989)
- Una Max (SteepleChase, 1990)

With Roy Haynes

- Togyu (RCA, 1975)
- Love Letters (Eighty-Eight's, 2002)

With Eddie Henderson

- Phantoms (SteepleChase, 1989)
- Think On Me (SteepleChase, 1989)

With Joe Henderson

- The Kicker (Milestone, 1968) – rec. 1967
- Tetragon (Milestone, 1968) – rec. 1967

With Buck Hill

- This Is Buck Hill (SteepleChase, 1978)
- Scope (SteepleChase, 1979)

With Steve Hobbs

- On the Lower East Side (Candid, 1995) – rec. 1993
- Second Encounter (Candid, 2003) – rec. 1994

With Freddie Hubbard

- High Blues Pressure (Atlantic, 1968)
- A Soul Experiment (Atlantic, 1969)
- The Black Angel (Atlantic, 1969)
- Sing Me a Song of Songmy with İlhan Mimaroğlu (Atlantic, 1971)
- Super Blue (Columbia, 1978)
- Outpost (Enja, 1981)
- The Rose Tattoo (Baystate, 1983)

With Bobby Hutcherson

- Now! (Blue Note, 1969)
- In the Vanguard (Landmark, 1987)

With Elvin Jones

- New Agenda (Vanguard, 1975)
- Time Capsule (Vanguard, 1977)

With Sheila Jordan

- The Crossing (BlackHawk, 1986) – rec. 1984
- Body and Soul (CBS/Sony, 1986)
- Lost and Found (Muse, 1989)
- One for Junior with Mark Murphy (Muse, 1993) – rec. 1991

With Kiyoshi Kitagawa

- Ancestry (Atelier Sawano, 2003)
- Prayer (Atelier Sawano, 2005)
- Live at Tsutenkaku (Atelier Sawano, 2006)

With Yusef Lateef

- The Centaur and the Phoenix (Riverside, 1960) – arranger only
- The Gentle Giant (Atlantic, 1971)
- Hush 'N' Thunder (Atlantic, 1972)
- Part of the Search (Atlantic, 1973)
- 10 Years Hence (Atlantic, 1974)
- The Doctor Is In... and Out (Atlantic, 1976)

With Keiko Lee

- Imagine (Sony, 1995)
- Beautiful Love (Sony, 1997)

With Abbey Lincoln

- A Turtle's Dream (Verve, 1994)
- It's Me (Verve, 2002)

With Russell Malone

- Sweet Georgia Peach (GRP/Impulse!, 1998)
- Heartstrings (Verve, 2001)

With Virginia Mayhew

- Nini Green (Chiaroscuro, 1997)
- No Walls (Foxhaven, 2000)

With Jane Monheit

- Never Never Land (N-Coded Music, 2000)
- Come Dream with Me (N-Coded Music, 2001)

With James Moody

- Another Bag (Argo, 1962)
- Comin' On Strong (Cadet, 1963)
- Moody and the Brass Figures (Milestone, 1966)
- The Blues and Other Colors (Milestone, 1969)
- Feelin' It Together (Muse, 1973)
- Timeless Aura (Vanguard, 1976)
- Sun Journey (Vanguard, 1976)
- Moving Forward (Novus, 1987)
- Honey (Novus, 1990)
- Moody 4A (IPO, 2008)
- Moody 4B (IPO, 2010) – rec. 2008

With Bob Mover

- Bob Mover (Vanguard, 1977)
- It Amazes Me... (Zoho Music, 2008) – rec. 2006

With Maria Muldaur

- Sweet And Slow (Tudor, 1983)
- Transblucency (Uptown, 1986) – rec. 1984

With Jimmy Owens

- No Escaping It (Polydor, 1970)
- Jimmy Owens (A&M/Horizon, 1976)
- Headin' Home (A&M/Horizon, 1978)
- The Monk Project (IPO, 2011)

With 'Hannibal' Marvin Peterson

- Naima (East World, 1978)
- The Angels of Atlanta (Enja, 1981)

With Roland Prince

- Color Visions (Vanguard, 1976)
- Free Spirit (Vanguard, 1977)

With Buddy Rich

- Transition with Lionel Hampton (Groove Merchant, 1974)
- Very Live at Buddy's Place (Groove Merchant, 1974)
- The Last Blues Album Volume 1 (Groove Merchant, 1974)
- Speak No Evil (RCA, 1976)

With Ali Ryerson

- Blue Flute (Red Baron, 1992)
- I'll Be Back (Red Baron, 1993)

With David Schnitter

- Thundering (Muse, 1978)
- Glowing (Muse, 1981)

With Bud Shank

- This Bud's for You... (Muse, 1985) – rec. 1984
- I Told You So! (Candid, 1993)

With Charlie Shoemake

- Sunstroke (Muse, 1978)
- Blue Shoe (Muse, 1979)

With Tommy Smith

- The Sound of Love (Linn, 1997)
- Spartacus (Spartacus, 2000)

With Charles Sullivan

- Re-Entry (Whynot, 1975)
- Kamau (Arabesque, 1995)

With Bob Thiele Collective

- Louis Satchmo (Red Baron, 1991)
- Lion-Hearted (Red Baron, 1993)

With Michal Urbaniak

- Music For Violin & Jazz Quartet (JAM, 1981)
- Songbird (SteepleChase, 1990)

With Frank Wess

- Two at the Top with Johnny Coles (Uptown, 1983)
- Magic 101 (IPO, 2011)
- Magic 201 (IPO, 2014) – rec. 2011

With Buster Williams

- Crystal Reflections (Muse, 1976)
- Tokudo (Denon, 1978)
- Heartbeat (Muse, 1978)
- Dreams Come True (Buddah, 1980) – rec. 1978
- 65 Roses (BluePort Jazz, 2008) – rec. 2006

With Hal Wilner

- Amarcord Nino Rota (Hannabal, 1981)
- That's The Way I Feel Now (A&M, 1984)

With others

- Clifford Adams, The Master Power (Naxos Jazz, 1998)
- Eddie Allen, Remembrance (Venus, 1993)
- Harry Allen, A Little Touch of Harry (MasterMix, 1997)
- Eric Alexander, Full Range (Criss Cross, 1994)
- Ray Alexander, Rain in June (Nerus, 1992)
- Karrin Allyson, Many a New Day: Karrin Allyson Sings Rodgers & Hammerstein (Motéma, 2015)
- Franco Ambrosetti, Live at the Blue Note (Enja, 1993)
- Curtis Amy, Mustang (Verve, 1967)
- Ray Anderson, Old Bottles - New Wine (Enja, 1985)
- Tim Armacost, Fire (Concord Jazz, 1995)
- Alvin Batiste, Late (CBS, 1993)
- Stefano di Battista, Parker's Mood (Blue Note, 2004)
- George Benson, Bad Benson (CTI, 1974)
- Jerry Bergonzi, Victor Lewis and Bobby Watson, Together Again for the First Time (Red, 1998)
- John Blake, Maiden Dance (Gramavision, 1984)
- Marion Brown, Soul Eyes (Baystate, 1978)
- Jeanie Bryson, I Love Being Here with You (Telarc, 1993)
- Dave Burns, Dave Burns (Vanguard, 1962)
- Terri Lyne Carrington, TLC and Friends (CEI, 1981)
- Benny Carter, All That Jazz – Live at Princeton (MusicMasters, 1990)
- Regina Carter, Rhythms of the Heart (Verve, 1999)
- Joe Chambers, New York Concerto (Baystate, 1981)
- Billy Cobham , The Art of Three (In + Out, 2001)
- Jay Collins, Uncommon Threads (Reservoir, 1994)
- Continuum, Mad About Tadd (Palo Alto, 1980)
- Keith Copeland, On Target (JazzMania, 1993)
- Larry Coryell, Shining Hour (Muse, 1989)
- Ted Curson, Quicksand (Atlantic, 1974)
- Charles Davis, Dedicated to Tadd (West 54, 1979)
- Santi Debriano, Obeah (Free Lance, 1987)
- Ted Dunbar, Secundum Artem (Xanadu, 1980)
- Madeline Eastman, Art Attack (Mad Kat, 1994)
- Dominick Farinacci, Lovers, Tales & Dances (Koch, 2008)
- Ella Fitzgerald, All That Jazz (Pablo, 1989)
- Joel Frahm, We Used to Dance (Anzic, 2006)
- Michael Franks, Tiger in the Rain (Warner Bros., 1978)
- Rebecca Coupe Franks, Suit of Armor (Justice, 1991)
- Nnenna Freelon, Heritage (Columbia, 1993)
- George Freeman, Man & Woman (Groove Merchant, 1974)
- Al Gafa, Leblon Beach (Pablo, 1976)
- Shannon Gibbons, Shannon Gibbons (Soul Note, 1987)
- Benny Golson, Time Speaks (Baystate, 1983) with Freddie Hubbard and Woody Shaw
- Duško Gojković, Bebop City (Enja, 1996)
- Al Grey and J. J. Johnson, Things Are Getting Better All the Time (Pablo, 1983)
- Johnny Griffin, Chicago, New York, Paris (Verve, 1995)
- Earl & Carl Grubbs (The Visitors), Rebirth (Muse, 1974)
- Jim Hall, Panorama: Live at the Village Vanguard (Telarc, 1996
- Billy Harper, Knowledge of Self (Denon, 1978)
- Eddie Harris, There Was a Time – Echo of Harlem (Enja, 1990)
- Albert Heath, Kwanza (The First) (Muse, 1973)
- Jimmy Heath, The Gap Sealer (Muse, 1973)
- Ron Holloway, Struttin' (Milestone, 1995)
- Jon Irabagon, The Observer (Concord Jazz, 2009)
- Pucci Amanda Jhones, Sweet Dreams (Cadence, 1997)
- Sam Jones, The Bassist! (Interplay, 1979)
- Geoffrey Keezer, Sublime: Honoring the Music of Hank Jones (Telarc, 2002)
- Barney Kessel, Red Hot and Blues (Contemporary, 1988)
- Eric Kloss, We're Goin' Up (Prestige, 1967)
- Cullen Knight, Looking Up (Cullen Knight Music, 1977)
- Lee Konitz, Jazz Nocturne (Venus/Evidence, 1994)
- Ralph Lalama, Momentum (Criss Cross, 1991)
- Babatunde Lea, Level of Intent (Diaspora, 1995)
- Kevin Mahogany, Double Rainbow (Enja, 1993)
- Ann Malcolm, Incident'ly (Sound Hills, 1993)
- Claire Martin, Too Much in Love to Care (Linn, 2012)
- Mel Martin, Mel Martin Plays Benny Carter (Enja, 1994)
- Greg Marvin, Workout! (Criss Cross, 1988)
- Christian McBride, Number Two Express (Verve, 1995)
- Tom McIntosh, With Malice Toward None: The Music Of Tom McIntosh (IPO, 2003)
- Meeco, Perfume e Caricias (Connector, 2010)
- Helen Merrill, Brownie: Homage to Clifford Brown (Verve, 1994)
- Red Mitchell, Talking (Capri, 1991)
- Bill Mobley, Triple Bill (Evidence, 1993)
- Frank Morgan, You Must Believe in Spring (Antilles, 1992)
- Mark Morganelli, Speak Low (Candid, 1990)
- Sam Most, From the Attic of My Mind (Xanadu, 1980)
- Idris Muhammad, Peace and Rhythm (Prestige, 1971)
- Judy Niemack, Heart's Desire (Stash, 1992)
- Bobbe Norris, You and the Night and the Music (CBS/Sony, 1986)
- Tiger Okoshi, Color of Soil (JVC, 1998)
- Nathen Page, Page-ing Nathen (Hudo's Music, 1982)
- P.J. Perry, Worth Waiting For (Jazz Alliance, 1991)
- Valery Ponomarev, Profile (Reservoir, 1991)
- Benny Powell, Why Don't You Say "Yes" Sometime?! (Inspire Productions, 1991)
- Judy Rafat, Con Alma – A Tribute to Dizzy Gillespie (Timeless, 1996)
- Dianne Reeves, The Grand Encounter (Blue Note, 1996)
- Justin Robinson, Justin Time (Verve, 1991)
- Perry Robinson, Funk Dumpling (Savoy, 1962)
- Claudio Roditi, Milestones (Candid, 1992)
- David Sanborn, Pearls (Elektra, 1995)
- Randy Sandke, Get Happy (Concord Jazz, 1993)
- Arturo Sandoval, A Time for Love (Concord Jazz, 2010)
- Jimmy Scott, All The Way (Blue Horizon, 1992)
- Doug Sertl, Uptown Express (Palo Alto, 1983)
- Woody Shaw, Solid (Muse, 1986)
- Janis Siegel, Experiment in White (Atlantic, 1981)
- Carol Sloane, Love You Madly (Contemporary, 1988)
- Jeffery Smith, A Little Sweeter (Verve, 1996)
- James Spaulding, Songs of Courage (Muse, 1993)
- Peter Sprague, The Message Sent on the Wind (Xanadau, 1982)
- John Swana, In the Moment (Criss Cross, 1996)
- Grady Tate, All Love (Village, 2002)
- Alex Terrier, Alex Terrier NYQ (Barking Cat, 2014)
- Buddy Terry, Pure Dynamite (Mainstream, 1972)
- Clark Terry, One on One (Chesky, 2000)
- Steve Turre, Colors for the Masters (Smoke Sessions, 2016)
- Stanley Turrentine, A Bluish Bag (Blue Note, 2007)
- Tom Varner, Jazz French Horn (Soul Note, 1985)
- Millie Vernon, Over the Rainbow (CBS/Sony, 1986)
- Roseanna Vitro, Listen Here (Texas Rose, 1984)
- Melissa Walker, I Saw the Sky (Enja, 2000)
- Bennie Wallace, The Nearness of You (Justin Time, 2004)
- Tyrone Washington, Natural Essence (Blue Note, 1967)
- Ernie Watts, The Long Road Home (JVC, 1996)
- Mark Whitfield, Patrice (Warner Bros., 1991)
- Barney Wilen, New York Romance (Venus, 1994)
- Ed Wiley, Jr., About the Soul (Talking House Productions / Swing, 2006)
- Tom Williams, Introducing Tom Williams (Criss Cross, 1991)
- Gerald Wilson, New York, New Sound (Mack Avenue, 2003)
- Joe Lee Wilson, Hey Look at You (East Wind, 1975)
- Pete Yellin, Dance of Allegra (Mainstream, 1973)
- Finn Ziegler, A Beautiful Friendship (Universal, 2003)
