= Stolen Moments (Oliver Nelson song) =

Jazz song by Oliver Nelson

Song by Oliver Nelson

from the album The Blues and the Abstract Truth
- Released: August 1961
- Recorded: February 23, 1961
- Studio: Van Gelder Studio
- Genre: hard bop, post-bop, modal jazz
- Length: 8:47
- Label: Impulse!
- Songwriter: Oliver Nelson
- Producer: Creed Taylor

Audio sample
- 30 seconds of "Stolen Moments" intro: file; help

"Stolen Moments" is a jazz standard composed by Oliver Nelson. It is a 16-bar piece though the solos are on a conventional minor blues structure. The recording of the song on Nelson's 1961 album, The Blues and the Abstract Truth, led to it being more generally covered. The tune was given lyrics when Mark Murphy recorded his version in 1978.

== History ==
The piece first appeared as "The Stolen Moment" on the 1960 album Trane Whistle by Eddie "Lockjaw" Davis, which was largely written and co-arranged by Oliver Nelson. It was not marked out as anything special, in fact the cover notes only mention that the trumpet solo is by Bobby Bryant and that Eric Dolphy's bass clarinet can be heard briefly on the closing. However, in the liner notes to Eric Dolphy: The Complete Prestige Recordings, Bill Kirchner states that this incorrectly credits Dolphy with playing what is actually the baritone saxophone of George Barrow, with Dolphy's contribution to the piece being the second alto behind Nelson.

The first recording of the song to gain attention was the version on Nelson's own 1961 album, The Blues and the Abstract Truth. Ted Gioia describes this version of as "a querulous hard bop chart that makes full use of the horns on hand with its rich spread-out voicings." Gioia also observes "a clever hook in the song – its brief resolve into the tonic major in bar four of the melody, one of the many interesting twists in Nelson's original chart." Nelson's solo on this version contains "possibly the most famous" use of the augmented scale in jazz.

Singer Mark Murphy wrote lyrics for his 1978 version. Gail Fisher later wrote different lyrics to Nelson's original melody. They were first recorded on the 1987 album The Carmen McRae – Betty Carter Duets. This vocal version of "Stolen Moments" was given the alternative title "You Belong to Her".

== Recordings ==
- Eddie "Lockjaw" Davis – Trane Whistle (1960)
- Oliver Nelson – The Blues and the Abstract Truth (1961)
- J. J. Johnson – J.J.! (1964)
- Herbie Mann with Chick Corea –Standing Ovation at Newport (1965)
- Phil Woods – Americans Swinging in Paris (1968)
- Ahmad Jamal – The Awakening (1970)
- Oliver Nelson – Swiss Suite (1972)
- Oliver Nelson – Stolen Moments (1975)
- Kenny Burrell – Moon and Sand (1979)
- Mark Murphy – Stolen Moments (1978)
- Jimmy Raney and Doug Raney – Stolen Moments (1979)
- Carmen McRae and Betty Carter – The Carmen McRae – Betty Carter Duets (1987)
- Grover Washington Jr. – Then and Now (1988)
- Turtle Island Quartet – Turtle Island String Quartet (1988)
- Frank Zappa and Sting – Broadway the Hard Way (1988)
- Lee Ritenour – Stolen Moments (1990)
- Stanley Jordan – Stolen Moments (1991)
- New York Voices – Hearts of Fire (1991)
- Joe Locke and Kenny Barron – But Beautiful (1991)
- United Future Organization – Stolen Moments: Red Hot + Cool (1994)
- Tina May – 'Time Will Tell...' (1996)
- Emilie-Claire Barlow – Sings (1998)
- Andy Summers and Victor Biglione – Strings of Desire (1998)
- Kenny Barron, Jay Leonhart, and Al Foster – Super Standard (2004)
- Kazumi Watanabe – Mo' Bop III (2011)
- Mary Stallings – Songs Were Made to Sing (2019)
