= CJQ =

CJQ can refer to:

- Melanoblossiidae, a family of spiders, by Catalogue of Life identifier
- Classical Jazz Quartet, a jazz quartet in the 2000s
- Centre jeunesse de Québec, a research organization at the Université Laval in Quebec, Canada
