= Naoko Terai =

Japanese Jazz violinist (born 1967)

Naoko Terai 寺井 尚子
- Born: May 1, 1967 (age 58); Fujisawa, Kanagawa, Japan
- Genres: Jazz
- Years active: 1986–present
- Website: .t-naoko.com

Naoko Terai (Japanese: 寺井 尚子, Terai Naoko; born May 1, 1967) is a Japanese jazz violinist. Her work mainly extends into jazz fusion, popular music, tango, and light classical pieces.

Naoko Terai was born in Fujisawa City and began studying violin at the age of four but was unable to pursue classical music due to Tendonitis. After being inspired by the work of Bill Evans, began working professionally as a jazz musician in the 1980s, where she was known for performing with Shigeharu Mukai and Mal Waldron. In 1995, she played violin on Kenny Barron's album Things Unseen and formed her own quartet three years later; touring with Lee Ritenour in 2000 and working with Richard Galliano in 2001.

== Discography ==
=== As leader ===
- Thinking of You (1998)
- Pure Moment (1999)
- Naoko Live (2001)
- Anthem (2003)
- The Best Of Naoko Terai (2003)
- Jealousy (2007)
- Petite Fleur Amapola (Somethin’ Else, 2008)
- Limelight (2011)
- Very Cool (2014)
- Hot Jazz... And Libertango (2015)
- The Standard (2017)
- The Standard II (2018)
- The Best Of Naoko Terai (Remastered – 2018)

=== Featured on ===
- Things Unseen (1995), with Kenny Barron
