= Vladimir Shafranov =

Russian-born jazz pianist

Vladimir Shafranov (born 1948 in Leningrad) is a Russian-born jazz pianist living on the Åland Islands. He started playing piano and violin at age 4, at the Rimsky-Korsakov conservatory. In 1973 he moved to Israel. After a few years he moved to Helsinki and is since 1980 a Finnish citizen. In 1983 he moved to New York where he played with many of the top players, such as Art Farmer, Stan Getz, Chet Baker, George Coleman, Ron Carter, Dizzy Gillespie and Al Foster. Since 1998 he has lived on the Åland Islands, touring regularly in Japan. He has recorded several albums for Atelier Sawano and Venus Records.

== Discography ==
As leader

- Live at Groovy (kompass, 1981)
- White Nights with George Mraz & Al Foster (The Jazz Alliance, 1992) – reissued from Atelier Sawano
- Movin' Vova (Atelier Sawano, 2000)
- Portrait in Music (Atelier Sawano, 2002)
- Russian Lullaby (Atelier Sawano, 2003)
- Kids Are Pretty People (Atelier Sawano, 2005)
- New York Revisited (Atelier Sawano, 2006)
- Easy to Love (Atelier Sawano, 2007)
- I'll Close My Eyes (Atelier Sawano, 2010)
- Whisper Not (Venus, 2012)
- From Russia With Love (Venus, 2015)
- Dear Old Stockholm (Venus, 2016)
- The Way You Look Tonight (Venus, 2019)
- Moonlight Becomes You (Venus, 2020)
- How High the Moon (Venus, 2020)
- Blues for Percy (Venus, 2022)
- Soul Eyes (Venus, 2026)
