= Mel Martin (disambiguation) =

Mel Martin (Melanie Jayne "Mel" Martin) (born 1947) is an English actor.

Mel Martin may also refer to:

- Mel Martin (car collector), founder of the Martin Auto Museum
- Mel Martin, saxophonist-flautist who has recorded with Kenny Barron
- Melvin Martin, winner of the 1991 American Pool Checker Championship
- Melvin Martin, American guitarist who played with Rob Cooper in the 1930s
