= Number Two Express =

Studio album by Christian McBride
- Released: April 15, 1996
- Recorded: November 16–17, 1995
- Studio: Clinton Recording Studios, NYC
- Genre: Jazz
- Length: 63:52
- Label: Verve
- Producer: Richard Seidel, Don Sickler

Christian McBride chronology
Gettin' to It (1995)	Number Two Express (1996)	A Family Affair (1996)

Number Two Express is the second studio album by the American jazz bassist Christian McBride. It was recorded in 1995 and released by Verve Records the following year. The album peaked at #23 in the Billboard Jazz Albums chart.

== Reception ==
Professional ratings
Review scores
Source	Rating
AllMusic	4/5 stars
Los Angeles Times	3/4 stars
Tom Hull	B+

Scott Yanow of AllMusic commented: "Continually interesting music which contains plenty of variety". Bill Kohlhaase, of the Los Angeles Times, wrote: "Bass sensation Christian McBride has followed his well-received debut album, 'Gettin' to It,' with a surprisingly modern album that shows him moving ahead in taste and ambition. While the first album focused on soulful sounds and its leader's gutbucket pluck, the new disc plunges hard ahead with smarts, sizzle and fine interplay between celebrity players including pianists Chick Corea and Kenny Barron, saxophonists Gary Bartz and Kenny Garrett, vibist Steve Nelson and drummer Jack DeJohnette (playing with Corea for the first time since their Miles Davis days). Not only has McBride's material become more sophisticated, his improvisations have also progressed a notch. They're not so reliant on riffs and repetition."

== Track listing ==
No.	Title	Writer(s)	Length
1.	"Whirling Dervish"	McBride	8:22
2.	"Youthful Bliss"	McBride	7:52
3.	"Tones for Joan's Bones"	Chick Corea	6:43
4.	"EGAD"	McBride	6:66
5.	"Miyako"	Wayne Shorter	5:23
6.	"Divergence"	McBride	9:21
7.	"Jayne"	Ornette Coleman	5:05
8.	"Morning Story"	McBride	4:51
9.	"Grove"	McBride	6:11
10.	"Little Sunflower"	Freddie Hubbard	3:58
Total length:			63:52

== Personnel ==
=== Musicians ===
- Christian McBride – Upright and Electric bass
- Kenny Barron – Piano
- Gary Bartz – Alto saxophone
- Mino Cinelu – Percussion
- Chick Corea – Piano
- Jack DeJohnette – Drums
- Kenny Garrett – Alto saxophone
- Steve Nelson – Vibes

=== Production ===
- Richard Seidel & Don Sickler – Production
- Jim Anderson – Recording

== Chart performance ==
Chart (1996)	Peak position
US Jazz Albums (Billboard)	23
