= But Beautiful (Kenny Barron and Joe Locke album) =

Studio album by Kenny Barron and Joe Locke
- Released: 1991
- Recorded: August 1991
- Studio: SteepleChase Digital Studio
- Genre: Jazz
- Length: 1:11:27
- Label: SteepleChase; SCCD 31295
- Producer: Nils Winther

Kenny Barron chronology
Quickstep (1991)	But Beautiful (1991)	The Moment (1992)

Joe Locke chronology
Longing (1991)	But Beautiful (1991)	Wire Walker (1993)

But Beautiful is an album of duets by pianist Kenny Barron and vibraphonist Joe Locke. It was recorded during August 1991, and was released later that year by SteepleChase Records. According to Locke, the musicians' goal was to create an album of instrumental ballads while maintaining "a vocal quality in the music."

== Reception ==
Professional ratings
Review scores
Source	Rating
AllMusic	4.5/5 stars
The Penguin Guide to Jazz	4/4 stars
The Virgin Encyclopedia of Jazz	3/5 stars

In a review for AllMusic, Ken Dryden wrote: "this is a lively release where both musicians 'sing' on their respective instruments... This strongly recommended CD should be considered a high-priority acquisition for fans of Joe Locke and/or Kenny Barron."

The authors of The Penguin Guide to Jazz Recordings awarded the album a full 4 stars, stating that the music is "played with authority and relaxed conviction," and commenting: "We've always had some doubts about piano-vibes combinations, but this one is exquisite."

The Chicago Tribune's Howard Reich remarked: "An album as soft-spoken, understated and musically sophisticated as this probably would not have had much of a chance with a major American record company... There are no artificial climaxes, no sturm und drang for its own sake."

Author Gene Rizzo noted that "Barron is at his best" in collaborative contexts, and stated: "His encounters with... Locke... unleash enough of Barron's post-McCoy Tyner quirks to make something memorable out of what could have been merely a relaxed set of standards."

== Track listing ==
1. "On A Misty Night" (Tadd Dameron) – 5:54
2. "You Don't Know What Love Is" (Don Raye, Gene DePaul) – 8:05
3. "Spring Is Here" (Richard Rodgers, Lorenz Hart) – 7:51
4. "Single Petal of a Rose" (Duke Ellington) – 3:41
5. "But Beautiful" (Jimmy Van Heusen, Johnny Burke) – 9:00
6. "The Island" (Ivan Lins, Vitor Martins, Alan Bergman, Marilyn Bergman) – 7:01
7. "Nancy (with the Laughing Face)" (Jimmy Van Heusen, Phil Silvers) – 6:24
8. "I've Grown Accustomed to Her Face" (Frederick Loewe, Alan Jay Lerner) – 7:50
9. "My Foolish Heart" (Victor Young, Ned Washington) – 8:33
10. "Stolen Moments" (Oliver Nelson) – 7:08

== Personnel ==
- Kenny Barron – piano
- Joe Locke – vibraphone
