= Kenny Barron at the Piano =

Studio album by Kenny Barron
- Released: 1982
- Recorded: February 13, 1981
- Studio: RCA Studios, Studio C, NYC
- Genre: Jazz
- Length: 50:51
- Label: Xanadu; 188
- Producer: Don Schlitten

Kenny Barron chronology
Golden Lotus (1980)	Kenny Barron at the Piano (1982)	Four in One (1982)

Kenny Barron at the Piano is a solo album by American jazz pianist Kenny Barron, recorded in early 1981 and released on the Xanadu label. This was Barron's first solo album and was followed by Spiral (1982), Live at Maybeck Recital Hall, Volume Ten (1990), and The Source (2023).

== Recording and release ==
Kenny Barron at the Piano was recorded on a 9-foot Steinway also used for recordings by classical pianists such as Artur Rubinstein and Van Cliburn. The program includes four originals (including a bonus track), two compositions by Thelonious Monk, one by Billy Strayhorn, and the widely covered jazz standard "Body and Soul".

The recording was reissued on CD in 2015 by Elemental Music, with one bonus track from the original session, as part of the Xanadu Master Edition.

== Reception ==
Professional ratings
Review scores
Source	Rating
AllMusic	4/5 stars
Jazzwise	4/5 stars
The Penguin Guide to Jazz	3.5/4 stars

In his review on AllMusic, Robert Taylor notes: "The set is a fine mix of standards and originals. ... Along with the duets he recorded with Stan Getz, this stands as the high-water mark in his stellar recording career." In JazzTimes, Philip Booth wrote: "At the Piano, Kenny Barron’s debut solo album, recorded in 1981 on a nine-foot Steinway in the same New York studio that was home to high-end classical players, offers an up-close snapshot of the virtuosity, broadly encompassing style and wide-ranging repertoire that would come to define his storied career."

== Track listing ==
All compositions by Kenny Barron except where noted.

1. "Bud-Like" – 6:02
2. "The Star-Crossed Lovers" (Billy Strayhorn, Duke Ellington) – 8:38
3. "Misterioso" (Thelonious Monk) – 7:45
4. "Calypso" – 4:02
5. "Body and Soul" (Johnny Green, Edward Heyman, Robert Sour, Frank Eyton) – 6:58
6. "Enchanted Flower" – 6:15
7. "Rhythm-a-Ning" (Monk) – 5:43
8. " Wazuri Blues" – 4:39 Bonus track on CD reissue

== Personnel ==
- Kenny Barron – piano
