= Jazz Nocturne =

Studio album by Lee Konitz Quartet featuring Kenny Barron
- Released: 1994
- Recorded: October 5, 1992
- Studio: Sound on Sound Studio, NYC
- Genre: Jazz
- Length: 50:56
- Label: Venus/Evidence; ECD 26085-2
- Producer: Big Apple Productions, Inc.

Lee Konitz chronology
Leewise (1992)	Jazz Nocturne (1994)	Lee Konitz Meets Don Friedman (1992)

Jazz Nocturne is an album by saxophonist Lee Konitz's Quartet, recorded in 1992 for the Japanese Venus label and released in the US on the Evidence label.

== Critical reception ==
Professional ratings
Review scores
Source	Rating
AllMusic	4.5/5 stars
The Penguin Guide to Jazz Recordings	3.5/4 stars

The AllMusic review stated: "Konitz digs into seven standards with an impressive rhythm section (pianist Kenny Barron, bassist James Genus and drummer Kenny Washington) and constantly comes up with interesting ideas and new twists. There are no phony disguises of familiar tunes with new titles on this date; just creative blowing. ... This CD is recommended as a strong example of Lee Konitz's playing in the '90s".

== Track listing ==
1. "You'd Be So Nice to Come Home To" (Cole Porter) – 6:14
2. "Everything Happens to Me" (Matt Dennis, Tom Adair) – 7:18
3. "Alone Together"(Arthur Schwartz, Howard Dietz) – 9:15
4. "Misty" (Erroll Garner) – 5:50
5. "Body and Soul" (Johnny Green, Frank Eyton, Edward Heyman, Robert Sour) – 8:52
6. "My Funny Valentine" (Richard Rodgers, Lorenz Hart) – 7:04
7. "In a Sentimental Mood" (Duke Ellington) – 6:21

== Personnel ==
- Lee Konitz – alto saxophone, soprano saxophone
- Kenny Barron – piano
- James Genus – bass (tracks 1 & 3–7)
- Kenny Washington – drums (tracks 1 & 3–7)
