= Kiyoshi Kitagawa =

Japanese jazz bassist, composer and arranger (1958–2026)

Kiyoshi Kitagawa 北川潔
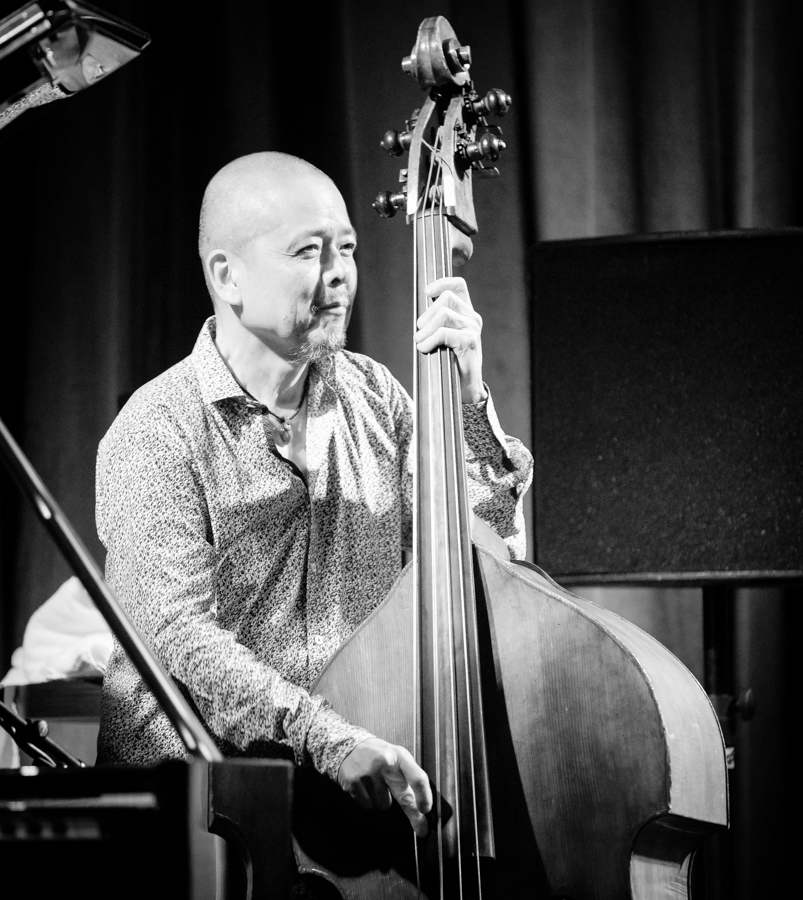
- Kitagawa at the Oslo Jazz Festival, 2018

Background information
- Born: December 5, 1958; Osaka, Kansai, Japan
- Died: April 28, 2026 (aged 67)
- Genres: Jazz
- Occupation: Musician
- Instrument: Double bass
- Years active: 1980s–2026
- Label: Atelier Sawano

Kiyoshi Kitagawa (Japanese: 北川潔; December 5, 1958 – April 28, 2026) was a Japanese-American jazz double bassist.

== Life and career ==
Kitagawa first played bass guitar and was in a rock band as a high school student. He switched to double bass while a student at Kansei Gakuin Daigaku, and in the 1980s, performed with Sadayasu Fujii and Takashi Furuya. In October 1988, he immigrated to the United States, settling in New York City. Kitagawa joined the Harper Brothers (Philip and Winard) and worked with Kenny Barron, Andy Bey, Jon Faddis, Kenny Garrett, Jimmy Heath, Susannah McCorkle, Makoto Ozone, Ben Riley, and Terell Stafford in the late 1980s and 1990s. He worked with Barron again several times in the 2000s, as well as with Brian Blade and Danny Grissett, and in the 2010s, with Regina Carter and Charles McPherson.

He received Grammy Award nominations for Kenny Barron's Book of Intuition and Beyond This Place, in 2017 and 2025, respectively.

Kitagawa died on April 28, 2026, at the age of 67.

== Discography ==
=== As leader ===
- Ancestry (Atelier Sawano, 2004)
- Prayer (Atelier Sawano, 2005)
- Solo (Atelier Sawano, 2006)
- Live at Tsutenkaku (Atelier Sawano, 2006)[DVD-Video]
- I'm Still Here (Atelier Sawano, 2007)
- Solo 2 (Atelier Sawano, 2008) – with photo album
- Live in Japan (Atelier Sawano, 2008) – compilation; recorded live in 2005
- Walkin' Ahead (Atelier Sawano, 2015)
- Turning Point (Atelier Sawano, 2017)
- Spring Night (Atelier Sawano, 2020)

=== As sideman ===
With Makoto Ozone

- Makoto Ozone – The Trio (Polydor, 1997)
- Dear Oscar (Polydor, 1998)
- Three Wishes (Verve, 1998)
- No Strings Attached (Polydor, 1999)
- Ballads (Universal Music Japan, 2008)

With Kenny Barron

- Images (Sunnyside, 2003)
- The Traveler (Sunnyside, 2008)
- Book of Intuition (Impulse!, 2016)
- Concentric Circles (Blue Note, 2018)
- Beyond This Place (Artwork, 2024)

With others

- Andy Bey, American Song (Savoy Jazz, 2004)
- Jon Faddis, Teranga (Koch, 2006)
- Kenny Garrett, Triology (Warner Bros., 1995)
- The Harper Brothers, Remembrance Live at The Village Vanguard (Verve, 1990)
- Jimmy Heath, You or Me (SteepleChase, 1995)
- Susannah McCorkle, From Bessie to Brazil (Concord Jazz, 1993)
- Ben Riley, Memories of T (Concord Jazz, 2006)
- Dan Rose, Fountains (MidLantic, 2003)
- Terell Stafford, Fields of Gold (Nagel-Heyer, 2000) – recorded in 1999
- Dayna Stephens, Today Is Tomorrow (Criss Cross Jazz, 2012)

== Sources ==
- Sugiyama, Kazunori (2004). Kernfeld, Barry (ed.). The New Grove Dictionary of Jazz (2nd ed.). ISBN 978-1-56-159284-5 – via Internet Archive.
