= The Source (Kenny Barron album) =

Studio album by Kenny Barron
- Released: January 20, 2023
- Recorded: July 13, 2022
- Studio: Théâtre de l'Athénée Louis-Jouvet
- Genre: Jazz
- Length: 67:00
- Label: Artwork Records
- Producer: Jean-Philippe Allard, Liza Bendaoud

Kenny Barron chronology
Without Deception (2020)	The Source (2023)	Beyond This Place (2024)

Professional ratings
Review scores
Source	Rating
All About Jazz	4/5 stars
DownBeat	4.5/5 stars
Financial Times	4/5 stars
Jazzwise	4/5 stars
Tom Hull	B+

The Source is a solo studio album by American jazz pianist Kenny Barron. The record was released on January 20, 2023, via the Artwork label in France. The Source was Barron's first solo album since his 1990 record Live at Maybeck Recital Hall, Volume Ten. The Source contains nine tracks: both jazz standards and originals written by Barron.

== Reception ==
Mike Jurkovic of All About Jazz commented, "The Source, like its distant predecessor At The Piano (Xanadu, 1982) has Barron brimming with the same empathy and effervescence, but with all the reflective nature the years tend to instill in a man who has made one to one conversation an art form." Stuart Nicholson of Jazzwise stated, "the solo Source is a fine example of his pianistic art, and how it has evolved since the 1990 Maybeck recording... If anything, technique is more apparent on The Source, suggestive of a confidence that comes with experience, since it is used in service of saying something, while harmonically he is more subtle, with strings of passing chords dropped into his line almost as asides."

== Track listing ==
No.	Title	Writer(s)	Length
1.	"What If"	Barron	8:02
2.	"Isfahan"	Billy Strayhorn, Edward Kennedy Ellington	6:06
3.	"Daydream"	Billy Strayhorn, Edward Kennedy Ellington	9:41
4.	"Teo"	Thelonious Monk	9:41
5.	"I'm Confessin' (that I Love You)"	Donald Dougherty, Ellis Reynolds, Al J. Neiburg	6:16
6.	"Dolores Street, SF"	Barron	8:54
7.	"Well You Needn't"	Thelonious Monk	5:42
8.	"Sunshower"	Barron	8:35
9.	"Phantoms"	Barron	8:01
Total length:			67:00

== Personnel ==
- Kenny Barron – piano
