= Golden Lotus (album) =

Studio album by Kenny Barron
- Released: 1982
- Recorded: April 4 & 18, 1980
- Studio: Downtown Sound Studio, NYC and Sound Heights Studio, Brooklyn, NY
- Genre: Jazz
- Length: 41:30
- Label: Muse; MR 5220
- Producer: Michael Cuscuna

Kenny Barron chronology
Together (1978)	Golden Lotus (1982)	Kenny Barron at the Piano (1981)

Golden Lotus is an album by pianist Kenny Barron, recorded in 1980 and first released on the Muse label in 1982 before being reissued on CD by 32 Records with Sunset to Dawn in 1997.

== Reception ==
Professional ratings
Review scores
Source	Rating
AllMusic	3/5 stars

In his review on AllMusic, Ron Wynn called it a "solid 1980 session with the always vibrant, challenging pianist Kenny Barron and the underrated saxophonist John Stubblefield in fiery form" In JazzTimes, David Zych wrote "Golden Lotus, vintage 1982, has Barron shunning the electrics, opting now to let his fingers control the touch and nuance of the tunes he's interpreting. All the tunes are his own, save for a wonderful "Darn that Dream," where Barron bares his soul with a gorgeous solo rendition of the ballad".

== Track listing ==
All compositions by Kenny Barron except where noted.

1. "Golden Lotus" – 5:57
2. "Dewdrop" – 6:38
3. "Cincero" – 8:57
4. "Darn That Dream" (Jimmy Van Heusen, Eddie DeLange) – 9:16
5. "Row House" – 10:42
- Recorded at Downtown Sound Studio, NYC on April 4, 1980 (track 4) and Sound Heights Studio, Brooklyn, NY on April 18, 1980 (tracks 1–3 & 5)

== Personnel ==
- Kenny Barron – piano
- John Stubblefield – tenor saxophone (tracks 1–3 & 5)
- Steve Nelson – vibraphone (tracks 1–3 & 5)
- Buster Williams – bass (tracks 1–3 & 5)
- Ben Riley – drums (tracks 1–3 & 5)
