= People Time: The Complete Recordings =

Live album by Stan Getz and Kenny Barron
- Released: 2009
- Recorded: March 3–6, 1991
- Venue: Jazzhus Montmartre, Copenhagen, Denmark
- Genre: Jazz
- Label: Universal Records 532 101-6, Sunnyside Records SSC 3084
- Producer: Jean-Philippe Allard

Professional ratings
Review scores
Source	Rating
Allmusic	4/5 stars
The Penguin Guide to Jazz Recordings	(Two-disc album)

People Time: The Complete Recordings is a set of seven CDs of music by saxophonist Stan Getz and pianist Kenny Barron which was recorded in March 1991 at Jazzhus Montmartre in Copenhagen, Denmark. It was released in 2009 (2010 in US).

When this album was recorded, Getz was suffering greatly from the liver cancer that would end his life three months after its completion. There were times that he had to take a break to allow the pain to subside, and he was urged to call a halt. However, he insisted on completing both the engagement at Jazzhus Montmartre and the recording. On the fourth and final night, though, they only played one set. It was announced by the stage manager that Getz was feeling too weak to continue after the break.

== Reception ==
The AllMusic review of the original two-disc set by Scott Yanow said "none of the 14 performances are less than great. A brilliant farewell recording by a masterful jazzman". AllMusic awarded the album 4 stars, but scores of AllMusic users have given it a cumulative rating of five stars.

== Track listing ==
=== Disc 1 (March 3, 1991) – First set ===
1. Stan Getz Announcement – 0:47
2. "I'm Okay" (Eddie del Barrio) – 6:32
3. "Gone with the Wind" (Allie Wrubel – Herb Magidson) – 6:33
4. "First Song" (Charlie Haden) – 11:49
5. "Allison's Waltz" (Alan Broadbent) – 8:38
6. "Stablemates" (Benny Golson) – 8:38

=== Disc 2 (March 3, 1991) – Second set ===
1. "Autumn Leaves" (Joseph Kosma – Jacques Prévert – Johnny Mercer) – 10:27
2. "Yours and Mine" (Thad Jones) – 13:45
3. "(There is No) Greater Love" (Isham Jones – Marty Symes) – 8:56
4. "People Time" (Benny Carter) – 8:49
5. "The Surrey with the Fringe on Top" (Richard Rodgers – Oscar Hammerstein II) – 8:02
6. "Soul Eyes" (Mal Waldron) – 5:45

=== Disc 3 (March 4, 1991) – First set ===
1. Tuning – 0:42
2. "You Don't Know What Love Is" (Don Raye – Gene DePaul) – 9:51
3. "You Stepped Out of a Dream" (Nacio Herb Brown – Gus Kahn) – 9:27
4. "Soul Eyes" (Mal Waldron) – 7:47
5. "I Wish You Love (Que reste-t-il de nos amours)" (Charles Trenet) (English version Albert A. Beach) – 8:35
6. "I'm Okay" (Eddie del Barrio) – 5:36
7. "Night and Day" (Cole Porter) – 8:51

=== Disc 4 (March 4, 1991) – Second set ===
1. "East of the Sun (and West of the Moon)" (Brooks Bowman) – 9:35
2. "Con Alma" (Dizzy Gillespie) – 10:33
3. "People Time" (Benny Carter) – 6:34
4. "Stablemates" (Benny Golson) – 10:12
5. "I Remember Clifford" (Benny Golson) – 6:07
6. "Like Someone in Love" (Jimmy van Heusen – Johnny Burke) – 8:40
7. "First Song" (Charlie Haden) – 8:44
8. "The Surrey with the Fringe on Top" (Richard Rodgers – Oscar Hammerstein II) – 7:53
9. "Yours and Mine" (Thad Jones) – 9:21

=== Disc 5 (March 5, 1991) – First set ===
1. "The End of a Love Affair" (Edward C. Redding) – 9:25
2. "Whisper Not" (Benny Golson) – 8:52
3. "You Stepped Out of a Dream" (Nacio Herb Brown – Gus Kahn) – 8:47
4. "I Remember Clifford" (Benny Golson) – 9:39
5. "I Wish You Love (Que reste-t-il de nos amours)" (Charles Trenet) (English version Albert A. Beach) – 7:51
6. "Bouncing with Bud" (Bud Powell) – 7:12
7. "Soul Eyes" (Mal Waldron) – 7:30
8. "The Surrey with the Fringe on Top" (Richard Rodgers – Oscar Hammerstein II) – 9:49

=== Disc 6 (March 5, 1991) – Second set ===
1. "East of the Sun (and West of the Moon)" (Brooks Bowman) – 9:55
2. "Night and Day" (Cole Porter) – 9:25
3. "First Song" (Charlie Haden) – 10:10
4. "Like Someone in Love" (Jimmy van Heusen – Johnny Burke) – 8:08
5. "Stablemates" (Benny Golson) – 9:33
6. "People Time" (Benny Carter) – 6:51

=== Disc 7 (March 6, 1991) ===
1. Stan Getz Announcement – 0:56
2. "Softly, as in a Morning Sunrise" (Sigmund Romberg – Oscar Hammerstein II) – 8:24
3. "I Wish You Love (Que reste-t-il de nos amours)" (Charles Trenet) (English version Albert A. Beach) – 8:49
4. "Hush-A-Bye" (Ambroise Thomas – Sammy Fain – Jerry Seelen) – 10:00
5. "I'm Okay" (Eddie del Barrio) – 5:54
6. "Con Alma" (Dizzy Gillespie) – 7:59
7. "Gone with the Wind" (Allie Wrubel – Herb Magidson) – 7:30
8. "The Surrey with the Fringe on Top" (Richard Rodgers – Oscar Hammerstein II) – 7:55
9. Bonus Track (Engineer Soundcheck): "Night and Day" (Cole Porter) – 8:55

== Personnel ==
=== Performance ===
- Stan Getz – tenor saxophone
- Kenny Barron – piano

=== Production ===
- Jean-Philippe Allard – producer
- Johnnie Hjerting – recording and mixing engineer
- Jay Newland – mastering and editing
- Gorm Valentin – liner photography
- Patrice Beauséjour – art direction and cover art
- Farida Bachir – box set production manager
