= Minor Blues =

Studio album by Kenny Barron Trio
- Released: August 19, 2009
- Recorded: May 4–5, 2009
- Studio: Avatar (New York, New York)
- Genre: Jazz
- Length: 72:23
- Label: Venus; VHCD-1032
- Producer: Tetsuo Hara and Todd Barkan

Kenny Barron chronology
The Traveler (2007)	Minor Blues (2009)	Softly, as in a Morning Sunrise (2010)

Minor Blues is an album by pianist Kenny Barron recorded in New York in 2009 and released on the Japanese Venus label.

== Reception ==
Professional ratings
Review scores
Source	Rating
AllMusic	4.5/5 stars
Jazzwise	3/5 stars

In the review on AllMusic, Ken Dryden noted "This is yet another fine example of Kenny Barron's superb chops in a small-group setting".

== Track listing ==
1. "Minor Blues" (Kenny Barron) – 6:29
2. "Beautiful Love" (Wayne King, Victor Young, Egbert Van Alstyne, Haven Gillespie) – 6:55
3. "Emily" (Johnny Mandel, Johnny Mercer) – 6:51
4. "For Heaven's Sake" (Elise Bretton, Sherman Edwards, Donald Meyer) – 9:00
5. "How Deep Is the Ocean?" (Irving Berlin) – 8:16
6. "Too Late Now" (Burton Lane, Alan Jay Lerner) – 8:34
7. "Don't Explain" (Billie Holiday, Arthur Herzog Jr.) – 6:30
8. "Hush-a-Bye" (Ambroise Thomas, Sammy Fain, Jerry Seelen) – 6:22
9. "I've Never Been in Love Before" (Frank Loesser) – 6:49
10. "My Ideal" (Leo Robin, Richard A. Whiting, Newell Chase) – 6:37

== Personnel ==
- Kenny Barron – piano
- George Mraz – bass
- Ben Riley – drums
