= Things Unseen =

Studio album by Kenny Barron
- Released: 1997
- Recorded: March 17–18, 1995
- Studio: Systems Two, Brooklyn, NY.
- Genre: Jazz
- Length: 1:13:15
- Label: Verve Records 314 537 315-2
- Producer: Joanne Klein

Kenny Barron chronology
| Wanton Spirit (1994) | Things Unseen (1997) | Swamp Sally (1995) |

Professional ratings
Review scores
| Source | Rating |
|---|---|
| AllMusic | 4/5 stars |

Things Unseen is a studio album by the American jazz pianist Kenny Barron, released in 1997 via Verve Records. The album contains eight original and previous compositions written by Barron.

== Reception ==
In his review on JazzTimes, Willard Jenkins noted: "Barron, who has achieved something akin to MVP status among piano players primarily for his broad capacity to enhance whoever’s session or record date he lays hands on, should also be recognized for his ability to artfully craft recordings under his imprimatur. The elegant 'Things Unseen' continues that craft. There is a certain airiness, a certain judicious use of space that pervades this date, as Barron and company certainly know how to avoid sonic traffic jams and engage a sense of openness that enhances this disc".

== Track listing ==
All tracks are written by Kenny Barron.

| No. | Title | Length |
|---|---|---|
| 1. | "Marie Laveau" | 13:37 |
| 2. | "The Sequel" | 9:27 |
| 3. | "Christopher's Dance" | 4:53 |
| 4. | "Tongue In Cheek" | 5:59 |
| 5. | "Rose Noire" | 8:22 |
| 6. | "Things Unseen" | 8:40 |
| 7. | "Joy Island" | 8:11 |
| 8. | "The Moment" | 14:06 |
| Total length: | | 1:13:15 |

== Personnel ==
Band

- Kenny Barron – piano
- David Williams – bass
- Victor Lewis – drums
- John Scofield – guitar
- Mino Cinelu – percussion
- John Stubblefield – saxophone
- Eddie Henderson – trumpet
- Naoko Terai – violin

Production

- Jean-Philippe Allard – executive producer
- Josef Woodard – liner notes
- Joe Marciano – mastering, mixing
- Joanne Klein – producer
