= Serenity (Stan Getz album) =

Live album by Stan Getz
- Released: 1991
- Recorded: July 6, 1987; Jazzhus Montmartre, Copenhagen, Denmark
- Genre: Jazz
- Length: 55:53
- Label: EmArcy; 838 770-2
- Producer: Ib Skovgaard

Stan Getz chronology
| Anniversary! (1987) | Serenity (1991) | Yours and Mine (1996) |

Serenity is a live album by saxophonist Stan Getz which was recorded at the Jazzhus Montmartre in 1987 and released on the EmArcy label in 1991.

== Reception ==
Professional ratings
Review scores
| Source | Rating |
|---|---|
| Allmusic | 4/5 stars |
| The Penguin Guide to Jazz Recordings | 4/4 stars |

The Allmusic review by Scott Yanow said "From the same sessions that resulted in Anniversary, Stan Getz celebrated his 60th birthday as he had his 50th, with a gig at the Cafe Montmartre in Copenhagen. ...Getz (who only had four years left) plays in peak form, really stretching out... His solo on "I Remember You" is particularly strong".

== Track listing ==
1. "On Green Dolphin Street" (Bronisław Kaper, Ned Washington) - 13:38
2. "Voyage" (Kenny Barron) - 12:05
3. "Falling in Love" (Victor Feldman) - 9:05
4. "I Remember You" (Victor Schertzinger, Johnny Mercer) - 10:08
5. "I Love You" (Cole Porter) - 10:57

== Personnel ==
- Stan Getz - tenor saxophone
- Kenny Barron - piano
- Rufus Reid - bass
- Victor Lewis - drums
