= Super Standard (album) =

Studio album by Kenny Barron, Jay Leonhart and Al Foster
- Released: December 22, 2004
- Recorded: September 7, 2004
- Studio: Avatar (New York, New York)
- Genre: Jazz
- Length: 67:38
- Label: Venus; TKCV 35343
- Producer: Tetsuo Hara and Todd Barkan

Kenny Barron chronology
Images (2002)	Super Standard (2004)	The Traveler (2007)

Super Standard is an album by pianist Kenny Barron, bassist Jay Leonhart and drummer Al Foster (billed for contractual reasons as the Super Trio) recorded in New York in 2004 and released on the Japanese Venus label.

== Reception ==
Professional ratings
Review scores
Source	Rating
Allmusic	4.5/5 stars
The Penguin Guide to Jazz Recordings	3/4 stars

In the review on Allmusic, Ken Dryden noted "As one of the busiest pianists around, Barron has a wealth of music at his fingertips and he doesn't disappoint with fresh approaches to standards and jazz compositions that make up this session".

== Track listing ==
1. "All of Me" (Gerald Marks, Seymour Simons) – 5:27
2. "Bye Bye Blackbird" (Ray Henderson, Mort Dixon) – 7:20
3. "Cherokee" (Ray Noble) – 5:02
4. "Cleopatra's Dream" (Bud Powell) – 3:59
5. "Doxy" (Sonny Rollins) – 6:48
6. "Misty" (Erroll Garner, Johnny Burke) – 8:11
7. "Stolen Moments" (Oliver Nelson) – 5:51
8. "Summer Night" (Harry Warren, Al Dubin) – 4:21
9. "Sunset and the Mockingbird" (Duke Ellington) – 5:32
10. "Sweet and Lovely" (Gus Arnheim, Harry Tobias, Jules Lemare) – 5:47
11. "Willow Weep for Me" (Ann Ronell) – 6:18
12. "Yesterdays" (Jerome Kern, Otto Harbach) – 3:02

== Personnel ==
- Kenny Barron – piano
- Jay Leonhart – bass
- Al Foster – drums
