= Swamp Sally =

Studio album by Kenny Barron and Mino Cinelu
- Released: 1996
- Recorded: September 1995
- Studio: Power Station, New York City
- Genre: Jazz
- Length: 65:29
- Label: Verve; 314 532 268-2
- Producer: Mino Cinelu

Kenny Barron chronology
Things Unseen (1995)	Swamp Sally (1996)	Live at Bradley's (1996)

Swamp Sally is an album by pianist Kenny Barron and multi-instrumentalist Mino Cinelu recorded in New York in 1995 and first released on the Verve label.

== Reception ==
Professional ratings
Review scores
Source	Rating
Allmusic	2.5/5 stars
Tom Hull	A

The review on Allmusic noted "This unusual collaboration between pianist Kenny Barron and multi-instrumentalist Mino Cinelu is as difficult to categorize as it is to ignore. The duo covers an extraordinary amount of stylistic ground on the session; though, as the title suggests, things are mostly rooted in a New Orleans flavor. However, this is only a single thread running through the larger tapestry of the music".

== Track listing ==
All compositions by Mino Cinelu except where noted.

1. "Louisiana Memories (Part 1)" – 3:33
2. "Relentless Pursuit" (Kenny Barron) – 10:19
3. "Simple Thoughts" (Barron, Cinelu) – 4:11
4. "Swamp Sally" – 5:27
5. "Mystère" (Barron) – 6:37
6. "Moon Dance" – 3:29
7. "Such a Touch" – 4:30
8. "Beneath It All" (Barron) – 6:57
9. "Shibui" (Barron) – 5:50
10. "Louisiana Memories (Part 2)" – 5:29
11. "Conversation" (Barron, Cinelu) – 4:02
12. "Monique" – 5:05

== Personnel ==
- Kenny Barron – piano, synthesizer, bass
- Mino Cinelu – guitar, synthesizer, drums, percussion, vocals
