= Together (Tommy Flanagan and Kenny Barron album) =

Studio album by Tommy Flanagan and Kenny Barron
- Released: 1979
- Recorded: December 6, 1978
- Studio: Sound Ideas, NYC
- Genre: Jazz
- Length: 37:13
- Label: Denon
- Producer: Yoshio Ozawa

Kenny Barron chronology
Innocence (1978)	Together (1979)	Golden Lotus (1980)

Tommy Flanagan chronology
The Super Jazz Trio (1978)	Together (1978)	Something Tasty (1979)

Together is a studio album by pianists Tommy Flanagan and Kenny Barron, digitally recorded in late 1978 and released on the Japanese Denon label in 1979.

== Reception ==
Professional ratings
Review scores
Source	Rating
AllMusic	4/5 stars
The Penguin Guide to Jazz	2.5/4 stars

In his review on AllMusic, Scott Yanow notes, "The two masterful pianists perform six vintage jazz standards with plenty of swing and spontaneous moments yet without making the ensembles too cluttered or crowded. In addition to their talents, both Flanagan and Barron prove to have very alert ears. Recommended".

== Track listing ==
1. "Dig" (Miles Davis) – 4:34
2. "If I Should Lose You" (Ralph Rainger, Leo Robin) – 8:05
3. "Stella by Starlight" (Victor Young, Ned Washington) – 5:54
4. "I Can't Get Started" (Vernon Duke, Ira Gershwin) – 6:21
5. "Darn That Dream" (Jimmy Van Heusen, Eddie DeLange) – 5:31
6. "The Way You Look Tonight" (Dorothy Fields, Jerome Kern) – 7:12

== Personnel ==
- Tommy Flanagan, Kenny Barron – piano
