= You Had Better Listen =

Studio album by the Jimmy Owens-Kenny Barron Quintet
- Released: 1967
- Recorded: January 16, 18–19, 1967
- Studio: New York City
- Genre: Jazz
- Length: 35:06
- Label: Atlantic
- Producer: Arif Mardin, Joel Dorn

Kenny Barron chronology
| You Had Better Listen (1967) | Sunset to Dawn (1973) |

Jimmy Owens chronology
| You Had Better Listen (1967) | No Escaping It (1970) |

You Had Better Listen is a studio album by the American trumpeter Jimmy Owens and the pianist Kenny Barron, recorded in 1967 and released on the Atlantic label.

== Reception ==
Professional ratings
Review scores
| Source | Rating |
|---|---|
| AllMusic | 3/5 stars |
| The Penguin Guide to Jazz Recordings | 3/4 stars |

In his review on AllMusic, Andrew Hamilton notes: "The Jimmy Owens-Kenny Barron Quintet doesn't condescend like some jazz artists tend to do; casuals can groove, relate, nod their heads in approval and feel righteous about it. Owens plays some beautiful trumpet scales, while Barron keeps busy banging chord progressions."

== Track listing ==
All compositions by Kenny Barron except where noted

1. "You Had Better Listen" (Jimmy Owens) – 8:32
2. "The Night We Called It a Day" (Matt Dennis, Tom Adair) – 5:11
3. "Gichi" – 6:36
4. "Love, Where Are You?" (James Moody) – 6:59
5. "Carolina John" – 8:07

== Personnel ==
- Jimmy Owens – trumpet, flugelhorn
- Kenny Barron – piano
- Bennie Maupin – tenor saxophone, flute
- Chris White – bass
- Rudy Collins (tracks 3 & 5), Freddie Waits (tracks 1, 2 & 4) – drums
