= Kenny Barron & the Brazilian Knights =

Studio album by Kenny Barron
- Released: June 18, 2013
- Recorded: June 10–11, 2012
- Studio: Visom Digital Studio, São Conrado, Rio de Janeiro, Brazil
- Genre: Jazz
- Length: 73:25
- Label: Sunnyside; SSC 3093
- Producer: Jacques Muyal

Kenny Barron chronology
Witchcraft (2012)	Kenny Barron & the Brazilian Knights (2013)	The Art of Conversation (2014)

Kenny Barron & the Brazilian Knights is an album by pianist Kenny Barron recorded in Rio de Janeiro in 2012 and released on the Sunnyside label.

== Reception ==
Professional ratings
Review scores
Source	Rating
Allmusic	4/5 stars
PopMatters	7/10 stars
Tom Hull	B+

In the review on Allmusic, Matt Collar said "This is highly engaging Brazilian jazz". On PopMatters Brent Faulkner wrote "Kenny Barron & The Brazilian Knights is a superb Brazilian jazz album. It not only highlights Kenny Barron's prodigious pianistic skills, but provides much deserved recognition to relatively unknown Brazilian musicians". In JazzTimes Michael J. West observed "Brazilian Knights is a high-quality recording from a musician whose high quality is inevitable".

== Track listing ==
All compositions by Kenny Barron except where noted.

1. "Rapaz de Bem" (Johnny Alf) – 5:59
2. "Já Era" (Maurício Einhorn) – 4:44
3. "Ilusão à Toa" (Alf) – 7:07
4. "Só Por Amor" (Baden Powell) – 11:10
5. "Curta Metragem" (Einhorn) – 5:03
6. "Nós" (Alf) – 6:54
7. "Triste" (Antônio Carlos Jobim) – 5:29
8. "Sonia Braga" - 7:12
9. "Tristeza de Nós Dois" (Einhorn) – 7:56
10. "Chorinho Carioca" (Alberto Chimelli) – 4:11
11. "São Conrado" (Einhorn) – 7:06

Bonus track on deluxe edition and iTunes:

12. "Phantoms – 8:43
13. "É Só Amar" (Alf) – 7:46
14. "É Só Amar" [alternate take] (Alf) – 7:46
15. "Nós" [alternate take] (Alf) – 6:54
16. "Ilusão à Toa" [alternate take] (Alf) – 7:08
17. "São Conrado" [alternate take] (Einhorn) – 7:06

== Personnel ==
- Kenny Barron – piano
- Maurício Einhorn – harmonica
- Idriss Boudrioua – alto saxophone
- Claudio Roditi – trumpet, flugelhorn
- Lula Galvão – guitar
- Alberto Chimelli – synthesizer
- Sérgio Barrozo – bass
- Rafael Barata – drums
