= Wanton Spirit =

Studio album by Kenny Barron
- Released: 1994
- Recorded: February 22–23, 1994
- Studio: Systems Two, Brooklyn, NYC.
- Genre: Jazz
- Length: 1:03:25
- Label: Verve Records 314 522 364-2
- Producer: Joanne Klein

Kenny Barron chronology
Other Places (1992)	Wanton Spirit (1994)	Things Unseen (1997)

Professional ratings
Review scores
Source	Rating
AllMusic	4.5/5 stars
Tom Hull	B+
Los Angeles Times	3.5/4 stars

Wanton Spirit is a studio album by the American jazz pianist Kenny Barron, with drummer Roy Haynes and bassist Charlie Haden. The album was released in 1994 on the Verve Records label. Wanton Spirit was nominated for a 1996 Grammy Award for Best Jazz Instrumental Performance.

== Reception ==
In his review on AllMusic, Lee Bloom noted: "Wanton Spirit further establishes him as a leader and teams him with bebop legend Roy Haynes on drums and Charlie Haden on bass. The early influences of Tatum, Powell, Monk, plus the melodic lines of Tommy Flanagan, the pentatonic harmony of McCoy Tyner, and the rhythmic fluidity of Herbie Hancock have all been thoroughly absorbed by Barron."

The Chicago Tribune critic Howard Reich wrote: "Though admired among connoisseurs, pianist Kenny Barron never has attained the acclaim he deserves. Perhaps his playing is a bit too subtle and introverted to reach a wide public, or perhaps his timing was off, since he arrived on the scene after the great legends of the '40s and '50s but before the young lions of the '80s. In any event, his name still signals first-rate pianism, as his recent release, Wanton Spirit, proves."

The Los Angeles Times reviewer Bill Kohlhaase stated: "Wanton Spirit makes up for Barron's near-miss recordings of the last few years while painting a more honest picture of his skills. It's an album that, finally, should bring him the accolades he deserves."

== Track listing ==
No.	Title	Writer(s)	Length
1.	"Take the Coltrane"	Duke Ellington	6:10
2.	"Sail Away"	Tom Harrell	6:27
3.	"Be Bop"	Dizzy Gillespie	8:34
4.	"Passion Flower"	Billy Strayhorn	7:40
5.	"Madman"	Kenny Barron	5:38
6.	"Nightlake"	Richie Beirach	6:53
7.	"Loss of a Moment"	Victor Lewis	8:01
8.	"Wanton Spirit"	Earl MacDonald	5:24
9.	"Melancholia"	Duke Ellington	2:40
10.	"One Finger Snap"	Herbie Hancock	5:58
Total length:			1:03:25

== Personnel ==
Band

- Kenny Barron – piano
- Charlie Haden – bass (except 9)
- Roy Haynes – drums (except 9)

Production

- Jean-Philippe Allard – executive producer
- Carol Friedman – photography
- Alain Gerber – liner notes
- Joanne Klein – producer
- Didier Marc – mastering
- Joe Marciano – engineer
