= Spirit Song =

Studio album by Kenny Barron
- Released: February 8, 2000
- Recorded: May 16–17, 1999
- Studio: Systems Two, Brooklyn, NY
- Genre: Jazz
- Length: 64:56
- Label: Verve; 314 543 180-2
- Producer: Joanne Klein

Kenny Barron chronology
Night and the City (1996)	Spirit Song (2000)	Freefall (2000)

Spirit Song is an album by pianist Kenny Barron recorded in New York in 1999 and released on the Verve label.

== Reception ==
Professional ratings
Review scores
Source	Rating
AllMusic	3/5 stars
Tom Hull	B+

In the review on AllMusic, Michael G. Nastos noted that "Barron has amassed a formidable number of high-quality recordings, but this ranks right up there near the top". In JazzTimes, Josef Woodard wrote: "The sum effect is a varietal garden of sounds and ideas, within the framework of Barron’s post-mainstream jazz sensibility".

== Track listing ==
All compositions by Kenny Barron except where noted.

1. "The Pelican" – 4:12
2. "Spirit Song" – 5:42
3. "Um Beijo" – 7:31
4. "Passion Flower" (Billy Strayhorn) – 9:54
5. "Passion Dance" (McCoy Tyner) – 6:12
6. "Sonja Braga" – 6:25
7. "The Question Is" – 5:21
8. "The Wizard" – 7:59
9. "Cook's Bay" – 7:05
10. "And Then Again" – 4:35

== Personnel ==
- Kenny Barron – piano
- David Sánchez – tenor saxophone (tracks 1–9)
- Eddie Henderson – trumpet (tracks 1–4, 6–9)
- Rufus Reid – bass (tracks 1–4, 6–9)
- Billy Hart – drums (tracks 1–4, 6–9)
- Russell Malone – guitar (tracks 2, 8, 10)
- Regina Carter – violin (tracks 3–4)
- Michael Wall Grigsby – percussion (track 2)
