= Freefall (album) =

Studio album by Kenny Barron and Regina Carter
- Released: May 15, 2001
- Recorded: December 19–20, 2000
- Studios: Systems Two, Brooklyn, NY
- Genre: Jazz
- Length: 69:25
- Labels: Verve; 314 549 706-2
- Producers: Karen Kennedy and Michelle Taylor

Kenny Barron chronology
Spirit Song (1999)	Freefall (2001)	Canta Brasil (2001)

Regina Carter chronology
Motor City Moments (2000)	Freefall (2000)	Paganini: After a Dream (2001)

Freefall is an album by pianist Kenny Barron and violinist Regina Carter recorded in New York in late 2000 and released on the Verve label.

== Reception ==
Professional ratings
Review scores
Source	Rating
Allmusic	3/5 stars
Tom Hull	B
The Penguin Guide to Jazz Recordings	2.5/4 stars

In the review on Allmusic, Richard S. Ginell stated "this session has plenty of life and wit; indeed, the sounds of the violin and piano go together as naturally in jazz as in the classical field (must be the resonating strings and wood factors that these instruments share). Carter clearly provides a lot of the spark with her ability to swing, often juxtaposed with classical poise straight from the conservatory, prodding the congenitally professional Barron into occasionally taking some chances". In JazzTimes Doug Ramsey wrote "The cohesion and joy of this duo’s music-making is consistent from beginning to end. Freefall is as close to flawless as any album I have heard this year".

== Track listing ==
All compositions by Kenny Barron except where noted.

1. "Softly, as in a Morning Sunrise" (Sigmund Romberg, Oscar Hammerstein II) – 6:55
2. "Fragile" (Sting) – 7:44
3. "Misterioso" (Thelonious Monk) – 6:01
4. "Phantoms" - 11:17
5. "What If" - 5:29
6. "Squatty Roo" (Johnny Hodges) – 4:14
7. "Freefall" (Kenny Barron, Regina Carter) – 8:22
8. "Shades of Gray" (Regina Carter) – 4:55
9. "Footprints" (Wayne Shorter) – 9:39
10. "A Flower" - 4:49

== Personnel ==
- Kenny Barron – piano
- Regina Carter – violin
