= Sambao =

Studio album by Kenny Barron
- Released: 1992
- Recorded: May 11–13, 1992
- Studio: BMG Studio, New York City.
- Genre: Jazz, latin
- Length: 59:20
- Label: Verve Records 314 514 472-2
- Producer: Joanne Klein

Kenny Barron chronology
Confirmation (1991)	Sambao (1992)	Other Places (1993)

Professional ratings
Review scores
Source	Rating
AllMusic	4/5 stars

Sambao is a studio album by American jazz pianist Kenny Barron, which was released in 1992 on Verve Records label. The album contains eight original instrumental compositions written by Barron.

== Track listing ==
All tracks are written by Kenny Barron.

No.	Title	Length
1.	"Sambao"	6:16
2.	"Yalele"	5:45
3.	"Bacchanal"	6:33
4.	"Belem"	5:37
5.	"Encounter"	10:50
6.	"Ritual"	6:04
7.	"Gardenia"	10:07
8.	"On the Other Side"	8:08
Total length:		59:20

== Personnel ==
Band

- Kenny Barron – composer, piano
- Nico Assumpção – bass
- Mino Cinelu – composer, percussion
- Toninho Horta – guitar
- Victor Lewis – drums

Production

- Joanne Klein – producer
- Jean-Philippe Allard – executive producer
- Joe Lopes – mixing
- Jay Newland – engineer, mixing
- José Ortega – mixing
