= Confirmation (Barry Harris and Kenny Barron album) =

Live album by Barry Harris-Kenny Barron Quartet
- Released: 1992
- Recorded: September 1, 1991
- Venue: Riverside Park Arts Festival, NYC
- Genre: Jazz
- Length: 72:19
- Label: Candid; CCD 79519
- Producer: Mark Morganelli

Kenny Barron chronology
The Moment (1991)	Confirmation (1992)	Sambao (1992)

Barry Harris chronology
Live at Maybeck Recital Hall Volume Twelve (1991)	Confirmation (1991)	Barry Harris in Spain (1991)

Reissue Cover

Confirmation is a live album by pianists Kenny Barron and Barry Harris recorded as part of the 7th Annual Riverside Park Arts Festival in 1991 and released on the Candid label.

== Reception ==
Professional ratings
Review scores
Source	Rating
Allmusic	4/5 stars
The Penguin Guide to Jazz Recordings	3.5/4 stars

In his review on Allmusic, Ken Dryden noted "The combination of two pianists simultaneously on-stage is the recipe for greatness or a train wreck, but with two masters like Barry Harris and Kenny Barron, the former is a sure bet ... This CD was unavailable for a time when the label changed hands, though it has since been reissued with a new cover with Barron getting top billing instead of Harris".

== Track listing ==
1. "Confirmation" (Charlie Parker) - 8:58
2. "On Green Dolphin Street" (Bronisław Kaper, Ned Washington) - 7:08
3. "Tenderly" (Walter Gross, Jack Lawrence) - 8:25
4. "Embraceable You" (George Gershwin, Ira Gershwin) - 9:47
5. "All God's Chillun Got Rhythm" (Kaper, Walter Jurmann, Gus Kahn) - 6:14
6. "Body & Soul" (Johnny Green, Edward Heyman, Robert Sour, Frank Eyton) - 8:56
7. "East of the Sun" (Brooks Bowman) - 10:33
8. "Oleo" (Sonny Rollins) - 6:16
9. "Nascimento" (Barry Harris) - 6:11

== Personnel ==
- Kenny Barron, Barry Harris – Steinway grand piano
- Ray Drummond – bass
- Ben Riley – drums
