= The Only One (Kenny Barron album) =

Studio album by Kenny Barron
- Released: 1990
- Recorded: June 6, 1990
- Studio: Van Gelder, Englewood Cliffs, NJ
- Genre: Jazz
- Length: 65:28
- Label: Reservoir; RSR CD 115
- Producer: Joanne Klein, Mark Feldman

Kenny Barron chronology
Rhythm-a-Ning (1989)	The Only One (1990)	Live at Maybeck Recital Hall Volume Ten (1990)

The Only One is an album by pianist Kenny Barron which was recorded in 1990 and released on the Reservoir label.

== Reception ==
Professional ratings
Review scores
Source	Rating
AllMusic	2.5/5 stars
The Penguin Guide to Jazz Recordings	3/4 stars

In his review on AllMusic, Ron Wynn stated: "Standards galore, each played with care, artistry, and brilliance".

== Track listing ==
1. "The Only One" (Kenny Barron) - 7:09
2. "The Surrey with the Fringe on Top" (Richard Rodgers, Oscar Hammerstein II) - 6:53
3. "The Courtship" (Benny Carter) - 6:05
4. "Blueswatch" (Christina Blalock) - 5:08
5. "On the Sunny Side of the Street" (Jimmy McHugh, Dorothy Fields) - 5:19
6. "Warm Valley" (Duke Ellington) - 6:24
7. "Manila" (Blalock) - 5:05
8. "Tone for Joan's Bones" (Chick Corea) - 5:13
9. "Love for Sale" (Cole Porter) - 7:12
10. "Delores Street, S.F." (Barron) - 5:51
11. "All God's Chillun Got Rhythm" (Walter Jurmann, Gus Kahn, Bronisław Kaper) - 5:09

== Personnel ==
- Kenny Barron – piano
- Ray Drummond – bass (tracks 1–5 & 7–11)
- Ben Riley – drums (tracks 1–5 & 7–11)
