= Live at Bradley's II =

Live album by Kenny Barron Trio
- Released: September 26, 2005
- Recorded: April 6, 1996
- Venue: Bradley's, 70 University Place, NYC
- Genre: Jazz
- Length: 60:07
- Label: Universal; 983 112 4
- Producer: Joanne Klein

Kenny Barron chronology
Live at Bradley's (1996)	Live at Bradley's II (2005)	Night and the City (1996)

Live at Bradley's II (subtitled The Perfect Set) is a live album by pianist Kenny Barron recorded in New York in 1996 and first released on the French Universal label in 2005 then on Sunnyside Records in the United States.

== Reception ==
Professional ratings
Review scores
Source	Rating
Allmusic	4/5 stars
All About Jazz	4/5 stars
Tom Hull	B+
The Penguin Guide to Jazz Recordings	3/4 stars

In the review on Allmusic, Scott Yanow noted " the trio's close interplay and ability to think as one" and said "The results are easily recommended". On All About Jazz Tom Greenland wrote "The Perfect Set: Live at Bradley's II captures three masterful musicians and one enthusiastic audience in mutual jazz worship" while Ollie Bivens said "These marvelous sixty minutes of music are like listening to an intimate conversation among long-time friends who are totally respectful of one another's views. This performance was indeed a "perfect set" and a showcase for true "smooth jazz.""

== Track listing ==
1. House Introductions – 0:32
2. "You Don't Know What Love Is" (Gene de Paul, Don Raye) – 15:16
3. "The Only One" (Kenny Barron) – 12:51
4. "Twilight Song" (Barron) – 11:00
5. "Shuffle Boil" (Thelonious Monk) – 6:23
6. "Well, You Needn't" (Monk) – 14:05

== Personnel ==
- Kenny Barron – piano
- Ray Drummond – double bass
- Ben Riley – drums
- John Moore – MC
