= Innocence (Kenny Barron album) =

Studio album by Kenny Barron
- Released: 1978
- Recorded: 1978
- Studio: Regent Sound Studios, NYC
- Genre: Jazz
- Length: 46:11
- Label: Wolf
- Producer: Joel Dorn

Kenny Barron chronology
Lucifer (1975)	Innocence (1978)	Together (1978)

Innocence is a studio album by American pianist Kenny Barron, recorded in 1978 and first released on the Wolf label.

== Critical reception ==
Professional ratings
Review scores
Source	Rating
AllMusic	4/5 stars

The Bay State Banner wrote that "Barron is a thorough soloist, one who slowly develops an idea rather than flail away and try to impress the novice."

== Track listing ==
All music is composed by Kenny Barron except where noted.

Innocence
No.	Title	Length
1.	"Sunshower"	12:05
2.	"Innocence"	10:07
3.	"Bacchanal"	7:58
4.	"Sunday Morning"	8:40
5.	"Nothing to Fear" (composed by Jimmy Owens)	7:21
Total length:		46:11

== Personnel ==
- Kenny Barron – keyboards
- Jimmy Owens – trumpet (tracks 4 & 5)
- Sonny Fortune – alto saxophone (tracks 1–3)
- Buster Williams – bass (tracks 1–3)
- Gary King – electric bass (tracks 4 & 5)
- Brian Brake (tracks 4 & 5), Ben Riley (tracks 1–3) – drums
- Rafael Cruz (tracks 1–3), Billy Hart (tracks 4 & 5) – percussion
