= 1+1+1 =

Studio album by Kenny Barron, Ron Carter and Michael Moore
- Released: 1986
- Recorded: April 23–24, 1984
- Studios: Van Gelder Studio, Englewood Cliffs, NJ
- Genre: Jazz
- Length: 37:45
- Labels: BlackHawk; BKH 50601
- Producer: Joanne Klein

Kenny Barron chronology
Green Chimneys (1983)	1+1+1 (1986)	Landscape (1984)

1+1+1 is an album by pianist Kenny Barron with bassists Ron Carter and Michael Moore which was recorded in 1984 and first released on the BlackHawk label.

== Reception ==
Professional ratings
Review scores
Source	Rating
Allmusic	4/5 stars

In his review on Allmusic, Stephen Cook stated "This fine duo outing, which has Ron Carter and Michael Moore trading off on bass, certainly shows Barron was in full control of his vigorous and tuneful style by the mid-'80s"

== Track listing ==
1. "The Man I Love" (George Gershwin, Ira Gershwin) – 5:10
2. "United Blues" (Ron Carter) – 3:34
3. "Prelude to a Kiss" (Duke Ellington, Irving Gordon, Irving Mills) – 5:11
4. "C Jam Blues" (Ellington, Barney Bigard) – 4:20
5. "In Your Own Sweet Way" (Dave Brubeck) – 5:58
6. "Giant Steps" (John Coltrane) – 3:06
7. "'Round Midnight" (Thelonious Monk, Cootie Williams, Bernie Hanighen) – 6:28
8. "Beautiful Love" (Victor Young, Wayne King, Egbert Van Alstyne, Haven Gillespie) – 3:58

== Personnel ==
- Kenny Barron – piano
- Ron Carter (tracks 2–3, 6, 8) – bass
- Michael Moore (tracks 1, 4–5) – bass
