= Lemuria-Seascape =

Studio album by Kenny Barron Trio
- Released: 1991
- Recorded: January 17, 1991
- Studio: Van Gelder Studio, Englewood Cliffs, NJ
- Genre: Jazz
- Length: 63:25
- Label: Candid; CCD 79508
- Producer: Mark Morganelli and Joanne Klein

Kenny Barron chronology
Invitation (1990)	Lemuria-Seascape (1991)	Quickstep (1991)

Lemuria-Seascape is an album by pianist Kenny Barron which was recorded in early 1991 and released on the Candid label.

== Reception ==
Professional ratings
Review scores
Source	Rating
AllMusic	3/5 stars
The Penguin Guide to Jazz Recordings	3.5/4 stars

In his review on AllMusic, Ron Wynn stated "The Barron/Drummond/Riley trio step forward into the '90s and churn out another impressive collection, this one containing mostly either Barron or group originals rather than tons of standards. Exacting, carefully constructed, and consistently brilliant playing all around".

== Track listing ==
All compositions by Kenny Barron except where noted.

1. "Lemuria" – 4:36
2. "Ask Me Now" (Thelonious Monk) – 5:31
3. "Sweet Lorraine" (Cliff Burwell, Mitchell Parish) – 7:19
4. "Fungii Mama" (Blue Mitchell) – 5:44
5. "Slow Grind" – 5:19
6. "Have You Met Miss Jones?" (Richard Rodgers, Lorenz Hart) – 5:11
7. "Maria Isabel" (Christina Blalock) – 6:36
8. "You Go to My Head" (J. Fred Coots, Haven Gillespie) – 9:01
9. "The Magical Look in Your Eyes" (Rufus Reid) – 7:40
10. "Seascape" – 5:31

== Personnel ==
- Kenny Barron – piano
- Ray Drummond – bass
- Ben Riley – drums
