= Bossas & Ballads – The Lost Sessions =

Bossas & Ballads: The Lost Sessions

Studio album by Stan Getz
- Released: March 17–19, 2003
- Recorded: March 26, 28, 29, 1989
- Studio: Los Angeles, California
- Genre: Jazz
- Length: 68:39
- Label: Verve
- Producer: Herb Alpert

Bossas & Ballads: The Lost Sessions is an album by jazz saxophonist Stan Getz.

== Background ==
In 1989, Getz recorded his first album for A&M Records, but album wasn't released until 2003. Getz recorded the album with Kenny Barron, Victor Lewis, and George Mraz, and it was produced by Herb Alpert.

== Track listing ==
No.	Title	Writer(s)	Length
1.	"Sunshower"	Barron	7:20
2.	"Yours and Mine"	Thad Jones	8:00
3.	"Joanne Julia"	Barron	7:51
4.	"Soul Eyes"	Mal Waldron	7:23
5.	"Spiral"	Barron	7:54
6.	"Beatrice"	Sam Rivers	8:15
7.	"The Wind"	Russ Freeman, Jerry Gladstone	8:56
8.	"El Sueño (The Dream)"	Barron	6:36
9.	"Feijoada"	Barron	6:24

== Personnel ==
- Stan Getz – tenor saxophone
- Kenny Barron – piano
- George Mraz – double bass
- Victor Lewis – drums
