= Mino Cinélu =

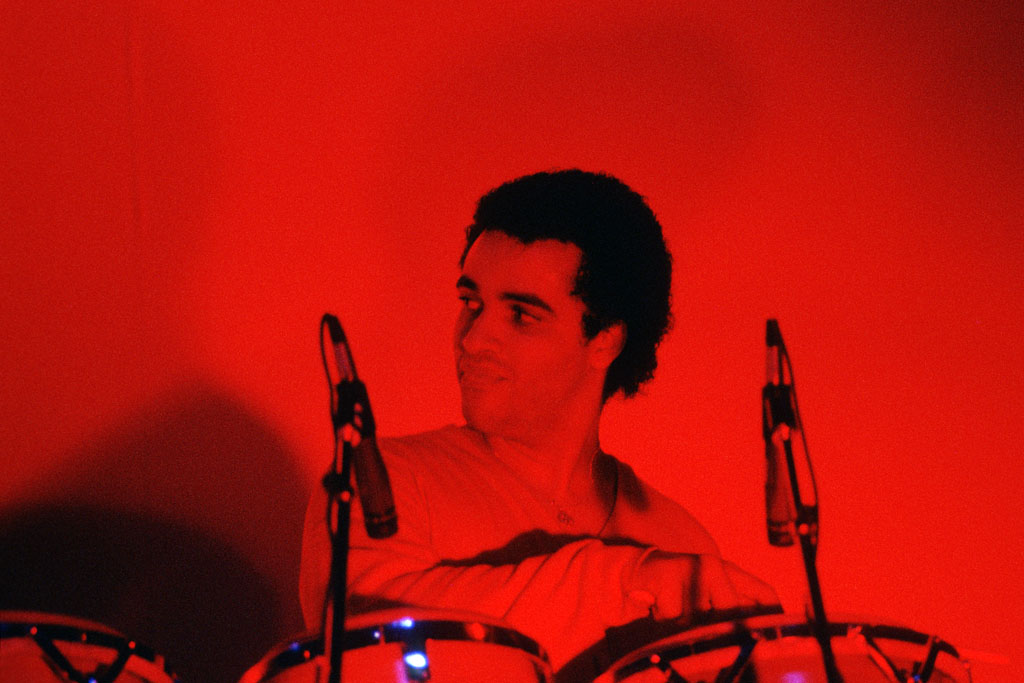
- Cinelu performing with Miles Davis, Palais des congrès de Paris, 1983

Background information
- Born: 10 March 1957 (age 69)
- Origin: Saint-Cloud, Hauts-de-Seine; France
- Genres: Jazz, blues, Afro-pop, jazz fusion, rock and roll
- Occupations: Musician; Composer; Producer
- Instruments: Drums, percussion, flute
- Label: Blue Thumb
- Formerly of: Weather Report
- Website: Mino Cinelu.com

Mino Cinélu (born 10 March 1957) is a French musician. He plays multiple instruments. He is a composer, programmer and producer; and is primarily associated with his work as a jazz percussionist.

== Biography ==
Cinelu was born in Saint-Cloud, Hauts-de-Seine. His father is from Martinique and his mother is French. He was involved with music from childhood as his father and two brothers were musicians, and started spending time and playing in various concert halls such as the Chapelle des Lombards in the suburbs of Paris. He became interested in various styles of music such as jazz, rock, salsa and even in more esoteric varieties like Egyptian chants and Romani music. He would later expand his repertoire to include fado, flamenco, African music, Japanese music, and Slavic music.

The first instrument that Cinelu took to was the bongo drums, which led him to decide to try to live from his music. He often played the bongos in the streets where he first experimented with improvisation. At the end of the 1970s he became more and more interested in the French jazz fusion scene where he made many connections with other musicians and members of the music industry. At varying times he worked with Jef Gilson, Chute Libre, and Moravagine. Shortly thereafter he began playing with artists such as Bernard Lavilliers, Colette Magny, Gong, and Toto Bissainthe.

In 1979, he moved to New York City. After a difficult start he met several musicians living in and around the city such as George Benson, Wayne Shorter, Kenny Barron, and Cassandra Wilson. He continued to learn new instruments in different contexts; for example he played the bass in a gospel choir and earned some money by giving drum lessons. In the beginning of the 1980s he met Miles Davis while playing in a soul band at the New York club Mikkel's. Miles offered him a job as percussionist in his group, playing alongside the group's drummer Al Foster. After a month of rehearsals, Cinelu went on tour with Miles Davis' band.

His stint with Miles Davis led to more recognition; during a concert at the Hollywood Bowl, Joe Zawinul contacted him to join Weather Report as percussionist, which he accepted. During this period he began composing music, with the help of Weather Report members Wayne Shorter and Joe Zawinul.

Cinelu also played with Michel Portal after Michel saw him play at the Théâtre du Châtelet with Miles Davis.

Starting in the 1990s, Cinelu began working on a solo career. His first solo album self-titled Mino Cinelu was released in 2000. Next came Quest Journey, on which Cinelu collaborated with guitarists Bill Frisell and Gerry Leonard, keyboardist Don Blackman, bassist Leo Traversa, DJs DJ Logic and Nickodemus, singer Toni Smith, and rapper Da Lioness. Quest Journey was followed by La californie in 2006.

== Discography ==
=== With Gong ===
- Gazeuse! (1976)

=== With Pat Metheny Group ===
- Imaginary Day (1997)

=== With Miles Davis ===
- We Want Miles (1982)
- Star People (1983)
- Decoy (1984)
- That's What Happened: Live in Germany 1987 (DVD, 1987)

=== With Weather Report ===
- Sportin' Life (1985, Columbia Records)
- This Is This! (1986, Columbia Records)

=== Solo career ===
- World Trio (1995)
  - With Kevin Eubanks and Dave Holland
- Mino Cinelu (2000)
  - With Moun Madinina
- Quest Journey (2002)
- California (2006)

=== With other artists ===
- Patrick Vian -- Bruits et Temps Analogues
- Eliane Elias – A Long Story (Manhattan, 1991)
- Robin Eubanks - Karma (JMT, 1991)
- Gil Evans - Live at Sweet Basil (Gramavision, 1984 [1986]), Live at Sweet Basil Vol. 2 (Gramavision, 1984 [1987])
- Michel Portal - Turbulence, 1987
- Sting - ...Nothing Like the Sun, 1987
- Andy Summers - World Gone Strange, 1991
- Roseanna Vitro - Reaching for the Moon (Chase Music Group, 1991); Softly (Concord Jazz, 1993); Tropical Postcards (A Records, 2004); Clarity: Music of Clare Fischer (Random Act Records, 2014)
- Kenny Barron/Mino Cinelu - Swamp Sally, 1995
- Christian McBride - Number Two Express, 1995
- Kenny Barron - Sambao, 1992
- Kenny Barron - Other Places, 1993
- Kenny Barron - Things Unseen, 1997
- Jacky Terrasson and Cassandra Wilson - Rendezvous (Blue Note, 1997)
- Geri Allen - Open on All Sides in the Middle (Minor Music, 1987); The Gathering (Verve, 1998)
- Jacky Terrasson - What It Is (Blue Note, 1999)
- Alain Bashung - L'Imprudence, 2002
- Layo & Bushwacka!/Mino Cinelu - Feels Closer, 2006
- Serge Forté - Thanks for All, Ella Productions 2004
- Anna Maria Jopek - Farat, 2003; Jo & Co, 2009
- Jacques Coursil - Clameurs, 2007
- Groove 55 - Voyage, 2012
- Kate Bush - Before the Dawn, 2016
- Nils Petter Molvær - SulaMadiana, 2020
