= Peruvian Blue =

Studio album by Kenny Barron
- Released: 1974
- Recorded: March 14, 1974
- Studio: Bell Sound (New York City)
- Genre: Jazz
- Length: 42:54
- Label: Muse
- Producer: Don Schlitten

Kenny Barron chronology
Sunset to Dawn (1973)	Peruvian Blue (1974)	In Tandem (1975)

Peruvian Blue is a studio album by American pianist Kenny Barron that was recorded in 1974 and first released on the Muse label.

== Reception ==
Professional ratings
Review scores
Source	Rating
Allmusic	4/5 stars
Tom Hull	A−

In his review on Allmusic, Scott Yanow notes: "Peruvian Blue has more than its share of variety. Kenny Barron is heard on piano, electric piano, and clavinet on various tracks ... This is an LP that rewards repeated listenings" On All About Jazz, Douglas Payne said "Peruvian Blue has much to offer casual jazz listeners and 'Two Areas,' 'The Procession' and 'Blue Monk,' especially, provide required listening for fans of both Kenny Barron and Ted Dunbar. But it would have been more satisfying to hear any one of these different groupings tackle the whole program, rather than having each get sectioned off for a performance or two. Still, Kenny Barron – who has recorded nearly dozen times as a leader since the early 80s – always makes music worth hearing. Peruvian Blue is no exception."

== Track listing ==
All compositions by Kenny Barron except where noted.

1. "Peruvian Blue" – 9:53
2. "Blue Monk" (Thelonious Monk) – 8:41
3. "The Procession" – 4:51
4. "Two Areas" – 9:46
5. "Here's That Rainy Day" (Jimmy Van Heusen, Johnny Burke) – 8:07
6. "In the Meantime" – 5:46

== Personnel ==
- Kenny Barron – piano, clavinet, electric piano
- Ted Dunbar – guitar (tracks 1, 2, 3, 4 & 6)
- David Williams – bass, electric bass (tracks 1, 3, 4 & 6)
- Albert Heath – drums(tracks 1, 3, 4 & 6)
- Richard Landrum – congas, percussion (tracks 1, 4 & 6)
- Sonny Morgan – percussion (tracks 1, 4 & 6)
