= Voyage (Stan Getz album) =

Studio album by Stan Getz
- Released: 1986
- Recorded: March 9, 1986; Music Annex Recording Studio, Menlo Park, California
- Genre: Jazz
- Length: 50:13
- Label: BlackHawk Records
- Producer: Herb Wong

Stan Getz chronology
Quintessence Volume 2 (1983)	Voyage (1986)	Anniversary! (1987)

Voyage is a 1986 jazz album by American saxophonist Stan Getz, accompanied by pianist Kenny Barron, who consistently played with his group for the last five years of Getz's career, bassist George Mraz, and drummer Victor Lewis. This album was released late in Getz' career and was rare to find until its 2008 re-release due to high demand and low supply. The style of Voyage is very versatile, ranging from Cool Jazz to Post-Bop.

== Reception ==
Professional ratings
Review scores
Source	Rating
Allmusic	4/5 stars

The album is voted as one of the Top 100 Jazz Albums of All Time by Carlos Sampayo. Scott Yanow of AllMusic has also commented "Stan Getz found a perfect accompanist in pianist Kenny Barron".

Voyage is a cosmic musical event that reveals the inside of Getz's unique tone and endless melodic ideas. The audio engineer seems to have understood the intimate nature of Getz's soul and recorded him probably as well as he was ever recorded. This feels like you're taking a ride inside his tenor sax, from deep and reedy low notes to those shocking, brilliant announcements where he slyly shouts, "Here's something you need to hear". Young tenor players who want some insight on tone need only listen to Stan's intro note on "Dreams". He holds it for two full measures and that single note tells an entire story. In this album, Kenny Barron and Stan Getz appear to have perfected the Vulcan mind-meld. Barron's backing is the perfect place setting for the Master's banquet of music. But then this amazing piano player time and again goes off on his own treks that are just about as good as you'll hear anywhere. Kenny Barron has proven over and over that he is one of the finest jazz pianists alive, no exceptions. George Mraz and Victor Lewis demonstrate what taste is all about. Everything they do perfectly complements Getz's tenor and Barron's piano. Mraz has several bass solos that are like small master classes on how to play a bass solo...an acoustic bass solo. In the final analysis this is one of the best jazz albums ever created. It is ethereal and satisfying. It is proof that four brilliant musicians who are masters of their respective instruments is all you need to produce lasting art. That it was made in Getz's final few years shows what pinnacles he had reached. If you can find this album, buy two—and hope they outlive you.

== Track listing ==
#	Title	Songwriters	Length
1.	"I Wanted to Say"	Victor Lewis	9:25
2.	"I Thought About You"	Jimmy Van Heusen	5:26
3.	"Yesterdays"	Jerome Kern	9:18
4.	"Dreams"	Kenny Barron	10:22
5.	"Falling in Love"	Victor Feldman	8:22
6.	"Voyage"	Kenny Barron	7:04
7.	"Just Friends"	John Klenner	9:23

== Personnel ==
- Stan Getz - tenor saxophone
- Kenny Barron - piano
- George Mraz - bass
- Victor Lewis - drums
- Herb Wong - producer, line notes
- Roger Seibel - Mastered the production
- Babatunde Lea - percussion
- Phil Edwards - Mixing Engineer
- Jim Dean - Assistant Engineer
