= The Traveler (Kenny Barron album) =

Studio album by Kenny Barron
- Released: August 26, 2008
- Recorded: December 12–13, 2007
- Studio: NYC
- Genre: Jazz
- Length: 68:46
- Label: Sunnyside; SSC 3079
- Producer: Karen Kennedy and Kenny Barron

Kenny Barron chronology
Super Standard (2004)	The Traveler (2008)	Minor Blues (2009)

The Traveler is an album by pianist Kenny Barron recorded in New York in late 2007 and released on the Sunnyside label. Sunnyside released the album on August 26, 2008.

== Reception ==
Professional ratings
Review scores
Source	Rating
Allmusic	4.5/5 stars
All About Jazz	4/5 stars
Tom Hull	B+

In the review on Allmusic, Ken Dryden noted "These 2007 sessions by Kenny Barron are a bit unusual, as he works with several different groups, playing mostly originals". On All About Jazz, Mark F. Turner wrote "The Traveler finds Barron once again on the move—a colorful palette of ten tracks with excellent sounds—featuring a new rhythm section and some very special guests. From the start of the title track, Barron's still got the touch—panache, grace, fire, and empathy. The result is a perfect portrait of his repertoire and depth ... fine recording by one of jazz's most respected pianists". In JazzTimes, Mike Joyce observed "A rather unlikely group of musicians tag along with Kenny Barron on The Traveler, making the pianist’s latest studio excursion all the more colorful and, at times, intriguing".

== Track listing ==
All compositions by Kenny Barron except where noted.

1. "The Traveler" – 7:07
2. "Clouds" (Kenny Barron, Janice Jarrett) – 7:03
3. "Speed Trap" – 7:38
4. "Um Beijo" (Barron, Jarrett) – 6:12
5. "The First Year" (Alex Nguyen) – 6:15
6. "Illusion" – 6:31
7. "Duet" (Barron, Lionel Loueke) – 6:19
8. "Phantoms" (Barron, Jarrett) – 9:14
9. "Calypso" – 6:40
10. "Memories of You" (Eubie Blake, Andy Razaf ) – 5:47

== Personnel ==
- Kenny Barron – piano
- Kiyoshi Kitagawa – bass (tracks 1–6, 8–9)
- Francisco Mela – drums (tracks 1–6, 8–9)
- Steve Wilson – soprano saxophone (tracks 1, 3, 6)
- Lionel Loueke – guitar (tracks 7–9)
- Ann Hampton Callaway – vocals (track 2)
- Grady Tate – vocals (track 4)
- Gretchen Parlato – vocals (track 8)
