= Invitation (Kenny Barron album) =

Studio album by Kenny Barron Quartet
- Released: 1991
- Recorded: December 20, 1990
- Studio: Van Gelder Studio, Englewood Cliffs, NJ
- Genre: Jazz
- Length: 57:32
- Label: Criss Cross Jazz; Criss 1044
- Producer: Peter Leitch

Kenny Barron chronology
Live at Maybeck Recital Hall Volume Ten (1990)	Invitation (1991)	Lemuria-Seascape (1991)

Invitation is an album by pianist Kenny Barron, recorded in late 1990 and first released on the Dutch Criss Cross Jazz label.

== Reception ==
Professional ratings
Review scores
Source	Rating
AllMusic	4.5/5 stars
The Penguin Guide to Jazz Recordings	3/4 stars

In his review on AllMusic, Stephen Cook stated: "Invitation finds Barron in full maturity as a writer and in the sympathetic company of tenor saxophonist Ralph Moore, bassist David Williams, and drummer Lewis Nash ... Throughout, Ralph Moore's choice tenor lines glide over the notes, Lewis Nash's tasteful drumming impressively anchors the group, and Barron's inventive solos ride atop the band in full stride. With great material, solid playing, and the full Criss Cross sound, Invitation ends up as one of Kenny Barron's finest outings of the 1990s".

== Track listing ==
All compositions by Kenny Barron except where noted.

1. "Namely You" (Gene de Paul, Johnny Mercer) - 9:14
2. "And Then Again" - 5:22
3. "Dew Drop" - 4:39
4. "Invitation" (Bronisław Kaper, Paul Francis Webster) - 7:41
5. "Joanne Julia" - 7:09
6. "Afternoon in Paris" (John Lewis) - 7:18
7. "You Don't Know What Love Is" (Gene de Paul, Don Raye) - 8:41
8. "Blue Monk" (Thelonious Monk) - 7:28

== Personnel ==
- Kenny Barron – piano
- Ralph Moore – tenor saxophone
- David Williams – bass
- Lewis Nash – drums
