= Quickstep (album) =

Studio album by Kenny Barron Quintet
- Released: 1991
- Recorded: February 18, 1991
- Studio: Van Gelder Studio, Englewood Cliffs, NJ
- Genre: Jazz
- Length: 60:59
- Label: Enja; 6084 2
- Producer: Joanne Klein

Kenny Barron chronology
Lemuria-Seascape (1991)	Quickstep (1991)	But Beautiful (1991)

Quickstep is an album by pianist Kenny Barron which was recorded in 1991 and released on the German Enja label.

== Reception ==
Professional ratings
Review scores
Source	Rating
Allmusic	3/5 stars

In his review on Allmusic, Stephen Cook noted "Barron displayed his considerable writing and playing skills in the company of top New York jazz musicians, refining the sound heard on classic '60s Blue Note releases ... A fine modern hard bop release".

== Track listing ==
All compositions by Kenny Barron except where noted.

1. "Once upon a Time" (John Stubblefield) – 8:10
2. "I Wanted to Say" (Victor Lewis) – 8:23
3. "Until Then" - 7:36
4. "Hindsight" (Cedar Walton) – 7:51
5. "Quick Step" - 5:52
6. "Here and There" (John Stubblefield) – 7:26
7. "Big Girls" (Lewis) – 15:41

== Personnel ==
- Kenny Barron – piano
- Eddie Henderson – trumpet
- John Stubblefield – tenor saxophone
- David Williams – bass
- Victor Lewis – drums
