= Landscape (Kenny Barron album) =

Studio album by Kenny Barron
- Released: 1985
- Recorded: October 5, 1984
- Studio: Vanguard Studio, NYC
- Genre: Jazz
- Length: 47:16
- Label: Baystate; RJL-8103
- Producer: Masahiko Yuh, Makoso Kimata and Fumimaru Kawashima

Kenny Barron chronology
1+1+1 (1984)	Landscape (1985)	Autumn in New York (1984)

Landscape is an album by pianist Kenny Barron which was recorded in 1984 and first released on the Japanese Baystate label.

== Reception ==
Professional ratings
Review scores
Source	Rating
Allmusic	4/5 stars

In his review on Allmusic, Ken Dryden stated "Kenny Barron emerged during the 1980s as one of the dominant pianists in his field, recording a series of first-rate releases for a variety of labels in the U.S., Europe, and Japan ... This first-rate effort will be appreciated by any fan of the great Kenny Barron".

== Track listing ==
All compositions by Kenny Barron except where noted.

1. "Hush-a-Bye" (Traditional) – 7:46
2. "Spring Is Here" (Richard Rodgers, Lorenz Hart) – 8:15
3. "Kōjō no Tsuki" (Rentarō Taki, Bansui Tsuchii) – 8:40
4. "Ringo Oiwake" (Fujio Ozawa, Masao Yoneyama) – 6:02
5. "Calypso" – 4:39
6. "Dear Old Stockholm" (Traditional) – 5:56
7. "Sunset" – 5:58

== Personnel ==
- Kenny Barron – piano
- Cecil McBee – bass
- Al Foster – drums
