= Other Places =

Studio album by Kenny Barron
- Released: 1993
- Recorded: February 1–2, 1993
- Studio: EastSide Sound, NYC.
- Genre: Jazz
- Length: 1:07:18
- Label: Verve Records 519 669-2
- Producer: Joanne Klein

Kenny Barron chronology
Sambao (1992)	Other Places (1993)	Wanton Spirit (1994)

Professional ratings
Review scores
Source	Rating
AllMusic	4/5 stars
Tom Hull	B

Other Places is a studio album by American jazz pianist Kenny Barron, which was released in 1993 on Verve Records label. The album includes original compositions by Barron and jazz standards.

== Reception ==
In his review on Allmusic Scott Yanow stated: "In the 1990s, Kenny Barron was finally recognized as one of jazz's top pianists, recording a series of top-notch and consistently inventive releases. This CD has seven of Barron's originals in which he is teamed with Ralph Moore (tenor and soprano), vibraphonist Bobby Hutcherson, bassist Rufus Reid, drummer Victor Lewis, and sometimes percussionist Mino Cinelu. These fine performances help to define the modern mainstream of the period. In addition, there are a pair of standards ("For Heaven's Sake" and a lengthy version of "I Should Care") that are played as sensitive duets with Reid. Excellent and often exquisite music."

== Track listing ==
No.	Title	Writer(s)	Length
1.	"Anywhere"	Barron	5:28
2.	"Other Places"	Barron	6:51
3.	"Mythology"	Barron	7:54
4.	"For Heaven's Sake"	Elise Bretton, Sherman Edwards, Don Meyer	8:01
5.	"Ambrosia"	Kenny Barron, Carole King, Dee Palmer	5:17
6.	"Wildlife"	Barron	6:45
7.	"I Should Care"	Sammy Cahn, Axel Stordahl, Paul Weston	10:50
8.	"Nikara's Song"	Barron	8:26
9.	"Hey, It's Me You're Talkin' To"	Victor Lewis	7:28
Total length:			01:07:18

== Personnel ==
- Kenny Barron – piano
- Mino Cinelu – percussion
- Bobby Hutcherson – vibraphone
- Victor Lewis – drums
- Ralph Moore – tenor sax
- Rufus Reid – bass
