= The Moment (Kenny Barron album) =

Studio album by Kenny Barron
- Released: 1992
- Recorded: August 22, 1991
- Studio: Van Gelder Studio, Englewood Cliffs, NJ
- Genre: Jazz
- Length: 71:10
- Label: Reservoir; RSR CD 121
- Producer: Mark Feldman

Kenny Barron chronology
But Beautiful (1991)	The Moment (1992)	Confirmation (1992)

The Moment is an album by pianist Kenny Barron which was recorded in 1991 and released on the Reservoir label.

== Reception ==
Professional ratings
Review scores
Source	Rating
AllMusic	4/5 stars

In his review on AllMusic, Ken Dryden states "This trio date, with the superb rhythm section of bassist Rufus Reid and drummer Victor Lewis, is one of Barron's most essential releases from the entire decade ... Highly recommended".

== Track listing ==
All compositions by Kenny Barron except where noted.

1. "Minority" (Gigi Gryce) – 7:33
2. "Fragile" (Sting) – 8:39
3. "Silent Rain" – 4:47
4. "I'm Confessin' (That I Love You)" (Al J. Neiburg, Doc Dougherty, Ellis Reynolds) – 7:39
5. "Jackie-ing" (Thelonious Monk) – 8:31
6. "Tear Drop" – 8:47
7. "The Moment" – 9:36
8. "Soul Eyes" (Mal Waldron) – 7:17
9. "How Deep Is the Ocean?" (Irving Berlin) – 8:21

== Personnel ==
- Kenny Barron – piano
- Rufus Reid – bass (tracks 1, 2 & 4–9)
- Victor Lewis – drums (tracks 1, 2 & 4–9)
