= Images (Kenny Barron album) =

Studio album by Kenny Barron Quintet
- Released: May 25, 2004
- Recorded: October 7–8, 2003
- Studio: Systems Two, Brooklyn, NY
- Genre: Jazz
- Length: 72:39
- Label: Sunnyside; SSC 3021
- Producer: Karen Kennedy

Kenny Barron chronology
Canta Brasil (2002)	Images (2004)	Super Standard (2004)

Images is an album by pianist Kenny Barron, which was recorded in New York in 2003 and released on the Sunnyside label.

== Reception ==
Professional ratings
Review scores
Source	Rating
AllMusic	3/5 stars
All About Jazz	5/5 stars
Tom Hull	B−
The Penguin Guide to Jazz Recordings	3/4 stars

In the review on AllMusic, Thom Jurek noted "this is another fine date by a pianist who seems to restlessly climb another rung with every outing even though he has been at the top of his game for decades". On All About Jazz, John Kelman wrote, "Barron shows with Images that he deserves to be recognized as much a leader and composer as an accompanist. And with this fine quintet on the road this summer, hopefully concentrating on material from the recording, more people will come to see him as exactly that". Russ Musto observed, "The flute and vibes grouping gives this unit an appealingly distinctive sound that is airy but never light, sweet but not saccharine. Barron is, not surprisingly, superb throughout, more than living up to his ever-growing reputation as one of the greatest pianist/composers of the day".

== Track listing ==
All compositions by Kenny Barron except where noted.

1. "So It Seems" – 4:12
2. "Jasmine Flower" – 5:47
3. "Inside Out" – 6:35
4. "The Lost Ones" (Stefon Harris) – 7:04
5. "Hallucinations" (Bud Powell) – 4:00
6. "Song for Abdullah" – 6:46
7. "Footprints" (Wayne Shorter) – 7:12
8. "Marie Laveau" – 7:40
9. "Miss Missy" (Harris) – 5:21
10. "Images" – 18:02

== Personnel ==
- Kenny Barron – piano
- Stefon Harris – vibraphone
- Anne Drummond – alto flute, C flute
- Kiyoshi Kitagawa – bass
- Kim Thompson – drums
