= Beyond This Place (album) =

Studio album by Kenny Barron
- Released: May 10, 2024
- Recorded: February 25 & 26, 2023
- Studio: Midi Studio Live
- Genre: Jazz
- Length: 52:49
- Label: Artwork Records ARTR007CD
- Producer: Jean-Philippe Allard

Kenny Barron chronology
| The Source (2023) | Beyond This Place (2024) |

Beyond This Place is a studio album by American jazz pianist Kenny Barron. The record was released by Artwork Records on 10 May 2024. The album was recorded together with saxophonist Immanuel Wilkins, vibraphonist Steve Nelson, bassist Kiyoshi Kitagawa, and drummer Johnathan Blake. The album contains both jazz standards and originals written by bandmembers.

== Reception ==
Professional ratings
Review scores
| Source | Rating |
|---|---|
| All About Jazz | 4/5 stars |
| Financial Times | 4/5 stars |
| Jazzwise | 4/5 stars |
| Tom Hull | A− |

Michael Ullman of The Arts Fuse wrote, "Barron is celebrating his eightieth birthday with a new album... I get the feeling that Barron is what you would call a chameleonic pianist: he can sound anyway he wants. Barron's had a career of over sixty years, and he continues to enthrall." John White of Jazz Journal stated, "Barron demonstrates his continuing mastery of all jazz styles and idioms." Pierre Giroux of All About Jazz commented, "The album is a testament to jazz's boundless creativity and spirit of exploration."

== Track listing ==
| No. | Title | Writer(s) | Length |
|---|---|---|---|
| 1. | "The Nearness of You" | Hoagy Carmichael, Ned Washington | 6:35 |
| 2. | "Scratch" | Kenny Barron | 5:35 |
| 3. | "Innocence" | Kenny Barron | 8:18 |
| 4. | "Blues on Stratford Road" | Johnathan Blake | 6:41 |
| 5. | "Tragic Magic" | Kenny Barron | 5:36 |
| 6. | "Beyond This Place" | Kenny Barron | 5:05 |
| 7. | "Softly, as in a Morning Sunrise" | Oscar Hammerstein II, Sigmund Romberg | 3:15 |
| 8. | "Sunset" | Kenny Barron | 7:10 |
| 9. | "We See" | Thelonious Monk | 4:34 |
| Total length: | | | 52:49 |

== Personnel ==
- Kenny Barron – piano
- Immanuel Wilkins – alto saxophone (tracks: 1 to 6, 8, 9)
- Kiyoshi Kitagawa – double bass (tracks: 1 to 6, 8)
- Johnathan Blake – drums (tracks: 1 to 8)
- Steve Nelson – vibraphone (tracks: 2 to 6, 8)
