= Live at Bradley's =

Live album by Kenny Barron Trio
- Released: 2001
- Recorded: April 3–4, 1996
- Venue: Bradley's, 70 University Place, NYC
- Genre: Jazz
- Length: 65:51
- Label: EmArcy; 549 099-2
- Producer: Joanne Klein

Kenny Barron chronology
Swamp Sally (1995)	Live at Bradley's (2001)	Live at Bradley's II (1996)

Live at Bradley's is a live album by pianist Kenny Barron recorded in New York in 1996 and first released on the French EmArcy label in Europe in 2001 then on Sunnyside Records in the US in 2002.

== Reception ==
Professional ratings
Review scores
Source	Rating
Allmusic	4/5 stars
All About Jazz	5/5 stars
The Penguin Guide to Jazz Recordings	3.5/4 stars

In her review on Allmusic, Judith Schlesinger noted "This CD was recorded live at the Greenwich Village bar that, for 25 years, showcased the best jazz pianists in the world. The atmosphere was relaxed and intimate, the audience hip and respectful; this collection reflects that history as it reveals three veteran masters at their best. Here are extended explorations of five varied tunes, featuring the elegant fluidity of Kenny Barron's piano, the fat sound and ever-swinging pulse of Ray Drummond's bass, and the superb intricacy of Ben Riley on drums ... This is an excellent CD full of serenely joyful energy, and it reveals new layers of delight with each spin". In JazzTimes Doug Ramsey wrote "Barron, bassist Ray Drummond and drummer Ben Riley stretch out in performances of five pieces captured with admirable fidelity by engineer Jim Anderson". On All About Jazz Samuel Chell said "Kenny Barron has never sounded better to me on record. After listening to him in this setting, I'm beginning to understand why so many musicians lamented the passing of Bradley's, the Manhattan night spot that featured a grand piano handpicked and donated by Paul Desmond".

== Track listing ==
1. "Everybody Loves My Baby" (Spencer Williams, Jack Palmer) – 15:27
2. "Solar" (Miles Davis) – 11:26
3. "Blue Moon" (Richard Rodgers, Lorenz Hart) – 9:44
4. "Alter Ego" (James Williams) – 13:23
5. "Canadian Sunset" (Eddie Heywood, Norman Gimbel) – 15:51

== Personnel ==
- Kenny Barron – piano
- Ray Drummond – bass
- Ben Riley – drums
