= Anniversary! =

Live album by saxophonist Stan Getz

Live album by Stan Getz
- Released: 1989
- Recorded: July 6, 1987
- Venue: Jazzhus Montmartre, Copenhagen, Denmark
- Genre: Jazz
- Length: 69:45
- Label: EmArcy; 838 769-2
- Producer: Ib Skovgaard

Stan Getz chronology
| Voyage (1986) | Anniversary! (1989) | Serenity (1987) |

Anniversary! is a live album by saxophonist Stan Getz which was recorded at the Jazzhus Montmartre in 1987 and released on the EmArcy label in 1989.

== Reception ==
Professional ratings
Review scores
| Source | Rating |
|---|---|
| Allmusic | 4/5 stars |
| The Penguin Guide to Jazz Recordings | 4/4 stars |

The Allmusic review by Scott Yanow said "This enjoyable set (mostly lengthy versions of standards) finds the veteran tenor still very much in his prime".

== Track listing ==
1. "El Cahon" (Johnny Mandel) - 13:18
2. "I Can't Get Started" (Vernon Duke, Ira Gershwin) - 11:27
3. "Stella by Starlight" (Victor Young, Ned Washington) - 12:33
4. "Stan's Blues" (Gigi Gryce) - 10:22
5. "I Thought About You" (Jimmy Van Heusen, Johnny Mercer) - 8:20 Bonus track on CD
6. "What Is This Thing Called Love?" (Cole Porter) - 9:43 Bonus track on CD
7. "Blood Count" (Billy Strayhorn) - 4:02 Bonus track on CD

== Personnel ==
- Stan Getz - tenor saxophone
- Kenny Barron - piano
- Rufus Reid - bass
- Victor Lewis - drums
