= Sunset to Dawn =

Studio album by Kenny Barron
- Released: 1973
- Recorded: April 2, 1973
- Studio: RCA Studios, NYC
- Genre: Jazz
- Length: 39:50
- Label: Muse
- Producer: Don Schlitten

Kenny Barron chronology
You Had Better Listen (1968)	Sunset to Dawn (1973)	Peruvian Blue (1974)

Sunset to Dawn is a studio album by American pianist Kenny Barron, recorded in 1973 and first released on the Muse label.

== Reception ==
Professional ratings
Review scores
Source	Rating
AllMusic	2.5/5 stars

In his review on AllMusic, Scott Yanow notes, "Kenny Barron could easily go unidentified if some of the selections on this LP were played for a listener during a "blindfold test" – he sounds quite unrecognizable on the three numbers on which he plays electric piano. Barron, who is joined by electric bassist Bob Cranshaw, drummer Freddie Waits, and the colorful percussion of both Richard Landrum and Warren Smith on his five originals and one by Waits, utilizes electricity with intelligence and creativity. His songs are moody and complex yet somewhat accessible and this underrated set would certainly surprise some of his current fans." In JazzTimes, David Zych wrote, "The program has Barron offering a rich program of originals with a '70s tinge, but nevertheless rich, imaginative, and worth repeated listenings".

== Track listing ==
All compositions by Kenny Barron except where noted.

1. "Sunset" – 9:08
2. "A Flower" – 6:56
3. "Swamp Demon" – 4:43
4. "Al-Kifha" (Freddie Waits) – 6:17
5. "Delores Street, S.F." – 6:43
6. "Dawn" – 6:03

== Personnel ==
- Kenny Barron – piano, electric piano
- Bob Cranshaw – electric bass
- Freddie Waits – drums
- Richard Landrum – congas, percussion
- Warren Smith – vibraphone, percussion
