= Venus Records =

Japanese jazz record label

- Founded: 1992
- Founder: Tetsuo Hara
- Genre: Jazz
- Country of origin: Japan
- Official website: www.venusrecord.com

Venus Records is a Japanese jazz record label. It was founded in 1992 by Tetsuo Hara, who had worked as a producer for RCA Victor. It mostly works with a select group of artists from Italy, the United States, and Japan, and uses a signature 24-bit mastering process, named "Hyper Magnum Sound," that produces "very powerful sound with strong presence". It is also known for its album covers, which use well-known photographers and frequently feature nudity.

== Discography ==
- VENUS-1002 Albert Ayler Bells (CD, RE, Promo) 1993
- TKCZ-79136 Marzette Watts Marzette Watts (CD, Album, RE) 1993
- TKCZ-79134 Burton Greene Trio The On Tour (CD, Album, RE) 1993
- TKCZ-79130 Giuseppi Logan More (CD, Album, RE) 1993
- TKCZ-79126 Patty Waters Sings (CD, Album, RE) 1993
- TKCZ-79118 Why Not? (CD, Album, RE) 1993
- TKCZ-79108 Giuseppi Logan Quartet The Giuseppi Logan Quartet (CD, Album, RE) 1993
- TKCZ-79102 Albert Ayler Spirits Rejoice (CD, Album, RE) 1993
- TKCZ-79101 Albert Ayler Trio Spiritual Unity (CD, Album, RE) 1993
- TKCZ-79004 Gil Evans Live at the Public Theater (New York 1980) (2xCD, Album, RE) 1993
- TKCZ-79005 Art Pepper with Sonny Clark Trio Holiday Flight - Lighthouse 1953 (2xCD, Album, RE, RM) 1993
- TKCV-79021 Barney Wilen Inside Nitty = Gritty (CD, Album) 1993
- TKCV-79016 Marion Brown Quintet Mirante Do Vale ~ Offering II (CD, Album, RE) 1993
- TKCV-79012 Marion Brown Quintet Offering (CD, Album, RE) 1993
- TKCY-79013 Dewey Redman Featuring Joshua Redman African Venus (CD, Album) 1994
- TKCZ-79158 Albert Ayler Quintet At Slug's Saloon 1966 (2xCD, Album, Comp) 1994
- TKCZ-79024 Richie Beirach Trio Methuselah (CD, Album, RE) 1994
- TKCV-79084 Paul Bley Trio Emerald Blue (CD, Album) 1994
- TKCV-79074 Paul Bley Trio Modern Chant (CD, Album) 1994
- TKCV-79055 Lonnie Smith Trio Purple Haze (CD, Album) 1994
- TKCV-79053 Lonnie Smith Trio Føxy Lady (CD, Album) 1994
- TKCV-79022 Lonnie Smith = John Abercrombie Trio The Afro Blue (CD, Album) 1994
- TKCZ-79506 Sonny Rollins Quintet / Thad Jones Sonny Rollins Plays (CD, Album, RE, Comp) 1995
- TKCZ-36010 Albert Ayler Trio Spiritual Unity (CD, Album, RE, Ltd, 24K) 1996
- TKCV-79307 Archie Shepp Quartet Blue Ballads (CD, Album) 1996
- TKCV-35015 Lee Konitz Quartet Jazz Nocturne
- TKCV-35134 Enrico Rava Italian Ballads (CD, Album) 1996
- TKCV-35018 Lee Konitz Lee Konitz & The Brazilian Band – Brazilian Serenade (CD, Album) 1996
- TKCV-35036 Steve Kuhn Trio Sing Me Softly of the Blues (CD, Album) 1997
- JAS-8007 Kenny Dorham The Arrival of Kenny Dorham (CD, Album, RE) 1997
- JAS-8004 JR Monterose The Message (CD, Album, RE) 1997
- TKCV-35102 Steve Kuhn Trio Love Walked In (CD, Album) 1999
- TKCV-35084 Richie Beirach Trio What Is This Thing Called Love? (CD, Album) 1999
- TKCV-35088 Steve Kuhn Trio Quiereme Mucho (CD, Album) 2000
- TKCV-35098 Steve Kuhn Trio Temptation (CD, Album) 2001
- TKCV-35091 Richie Beirach Trio Romantic Rhapsody (CD, Album) 2001
- TKCV-35307 Steve Kuhn Trio Waltz – Red Side (CD, Album) 2002
- TKCV-35306 Steve Kuhn Trio Waltz – Blue Side (CD, Album) 2002
- TKCV-35305 Richie Beirach Trio No Borders (CD, Album) 2002
- TKCV-35302 Enrico Rava Renaissance (CD, Album) 2002
- TKCV-35343 Super Trio Super Standard (CD, Album) 2004
- TKCV-35524 Archie Shepp Quartet Deja Vu (CD, Album) 2003
- VHCD-78073 Peter Bernstein Stranger in Paradise (CD) 2003
- SSC 1109 Steve Kuhn Love Walked In (CD, Album) 2003
- KACD 0304 Roland Hanna with Ron Carter, Grady Tate Apres Un Reve (CD, Album) 2003
- TKCV-35336 Steve Kuhn Trio Easy to Love (CD, Album) 2004
- TKJV-19157 Nicole Henry Teach Me Tonight (LP, Album) 2005
- TKJV-19145 Simone Romance (LP) 2005
- TKCV-35346 Nicole Henry Teach Me Tonight (CD, Album) 2005
- TKCV-35349 Cedar Walton Midnight Waltz (CD, Album) 2005
- TKCV-35380 Richie Beirach Trio Manhattan Reverie (CD, Album) 2006
- TKCV-35361 Steve Kuhn Trio Pavane for a Dead Princess (CD, Album) 2006
- TKCV-35200 Simone Moonlight Serenade (CD, Album, RE, RM, Pap) 2006
- TKJV-19183 Simone Taking a Chance On Love (LP, Album) 2007
- TKCV-35218 Rob Agerbeek Trio The Very Thought of You (CD, Album) 2007
- TKCV-35397 Simone Taking a Chance On Love (CD, Album) 2007
- TKCV-35395 Steve Kuhn Trio Plays Standards (CD, Album) 2007
- VHJD-8 Marilyn Scott Every Time We Say Goodbye (LP, Album) 2008
- VHJD-19 Simone Let's Fall in Love (LP, Album) 2008
- VHCD-1017 Tessa Souter Nights of Key Largo (CD, Album) 2008
- VHCD-1010 Simone Let's Fall in Love (CD, Album) 2008
- VHCD-1003 Steve Kuhn Trio Baubles, Bangles and Beads (CD, Album) 2008
- TKJV-19194 Nicki Parrott Moon River (LP, Album) 2008
- TKCV-35419 Marilyn Scott Every Time We Say Goodbye (CD, Album) 2008
- TKCV-35417 Richie Beirach Trio Summer Night (CD, Album) 2008
- VHJD-21 Nicki Parrott Fly Me to the Moon (LP) 2009
- VHJD-13 Tessa Souter Nights of Key Largo (LP, Album) 2009
- VHCD-8009 Simone Essential Best (CD, Album, Comp) 2009
- VHCD-5011 Nicki Parrott Moon River (CD, Album) 2009
- VHCD-1021 Phil Woods Quintet Ballads & Blues (CD, Album) 2009
- VHCD-1032 Kenny Barron Trio Minor Blues (CD, Album) 2009
- VHCD-1035 Alexis Cole Someday My Prince Will Come (CD, Album) 2009
- VHCD-1024 Richie Beirach Jazz Adagio (CD, Album) 2009
- VHCD-1023 Nicki Parrott Fly Me to the Moon (CD, Album) 2009
- VHCD-1154 Tete Montoliu Catalonian Rhapsody (CD, Album) 2014
- VHJD-37 Alexis Cole Someday My Prince Will Come (LP, Album) 2010
- VHCD-4122 Simone Romance (CD, Album, RE) 2010
- VHCD-4121 Simone Moonlight Serenade (CD, Album, RE) 2010
- VHCD-1046 Alexis Cole with One for All (3) You'd Be So Nice to Come Home To (CD, Album) 2010
- VHCD-1045 Simone & Her Hawaiian Jazz Band Alomas of Hawaii (CD, Album) 2010
- VHCD-1044 Steve Kuhn Trio I Will Wait for You – The Music of Michel Legrand (CD, Album) 2010
- VHCD-1041 Nicki Parrott Black Coffee (CD, Album) 2010
- VHJD-49 Simone & Her Hawaiian Jazz Band Alomas of Hawaii (LP, Album) 2011
- VHJD-44 Alexis Cole (with One for All) You'd Be So Nice to Come Home To (LP, Album) 2011
- VHJD-41 Nicki Parrott Black Coffee (LP, Album) 2011
