= Classical Jazz Quartet =

- Genres: Jazz fusion
- Years active: 2001–2002
- Members: Kenny Barron; Stefon Harris; Ron Carter; Lewis Nash

The Classical Jazz Quartet was a jazz quartet that existed in the early 2000s. It consisted of four established jazz performers playing classical music interpretations written, arranged, and produced by Bob Belden and Suzanne Severini. In this the "CJQ" followed in the footsteps of the Modern Jazz Quartet (MJQ, 1952–1997, using the same instrumentation), and the Jacques Loussier Trio (1959–2019, minus the vibraphone).

== Band members ==
- Kenny Barron – piano
- Stefon Harris – vibes, marimba
- Ron Carter – bass
- Lewis Nash – drums

== Discography ==
- Tchaikovsky's Nutcracker (2001, Vertical Jazz), reissued as The Classical Jazz Quartet Play Tchaikovsky (Kind of Blue Records, 2006)
- The Classical Jazz Quartet Plays Bach (Vertical Jazz, 2002)
- The Classical Jazz Quartet Play Rachmaninov (recorded 2002, released May 16, 2006, Kind of Blue Records). The recording consists of Rachmaninov's Piano Concerto No. 2.
- Christmas (Kind of Blue Records, 2006)(a compilation of six tracks from Tchaikovsky's Nutcracker, one from Plays Bach and a previously unreleased version of George Frideric Handel's Messiah (Handel))
- The Complete Recordings (compilation, Recordings Arts, 2004)
- Anthology (incomplete compilation, Il Sole 24 ore, 2011)
