= Live at Maybeck Recital Hall, Volume Ten =

Live at Maybeck Recital Hall Volume Ten

Live album by Kenny Barron
- Released: 1991
- Recorded: December 3, 1990
- Venue: Maybeck Recital Hall, Berkeley, CA
- Genre: Jazz
- Length: 60:55
- Label: Concord; CCD-4466

Kenny Barron chronology
The Only One (1990)	Live at Maybeck Recital Hall Volume Ten (1991)	Invitation (1990)

Live at Maybeck Recital Hall, Volume Ten is a live solo album by jazz pianist Kenny Barron recorded at the Maybeck Recital Hall in California in late 1990 and released on the Concord label.

== Reception ==
Professional ratings
Review scores
Source	Rating
Allmusic	4/5 stars
The Penguin Guide to Jazz	3/4 stars
The Rolling Stone Jazz & Blues Album Guide	4.5/5 stars

In his review on AllMusic, Richard S. Ginell noted "Producing a darker tone from the Maybeck Yamaha piano than do some other participants in the series, Kenny Barron gets a chance to flaunt a wider range of his influences than he usually does in a group format ... As usual with Maybeck, the sound of the hall's bright, brittle Yamaha piano is brilliantly captured".

== Track listing ==
All compositions by Kenny Barron except where noted.

1. "I'm Getting Sentimental Over You" (George Bassman, Ned Washington) - 7:17
2. "Witchcraft" (Cy Coleman, Carolyn Leigh) - 8:49
3. "Bud-Like" - 5:35
4. "Spring Is Here" (Richard Rodgers, Lorenz Hart) - 10:48
5. "Well, You Needn't" (Thelonious Monk) - 6:50
6. "Skylark" (Hoagy Carmichael, Johnny Mercer) - 8:27
7. "And Then Again" - 5:29
8. "Sunshower" - 10:04

== Personnel ==
- Kenny Barron - piano
