= Kenny Barron =

American jazz pianist (born 1943)

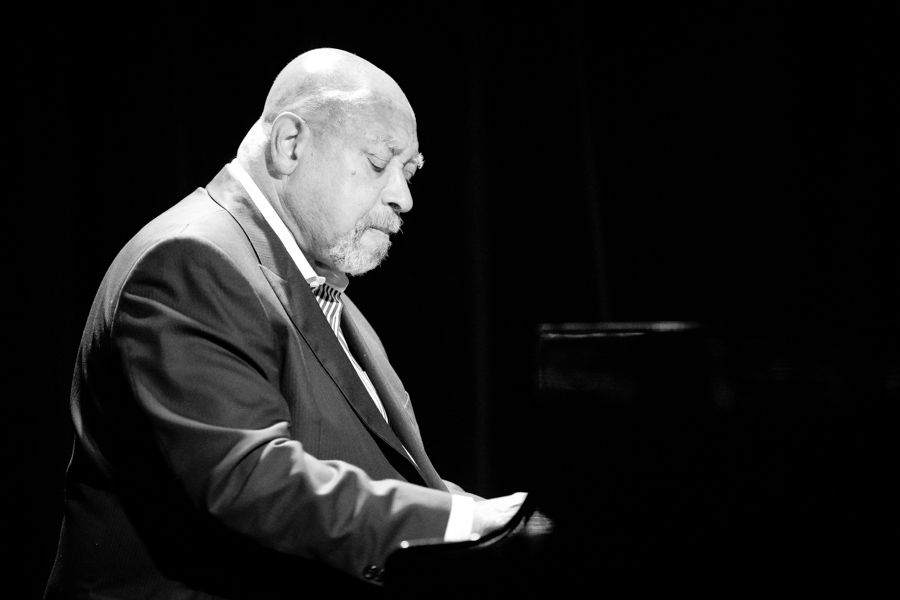
- Barron at the Oslo Jazzfestival 2018

Background information
- Born: June 9, 1943 (age 83); Philadelphia, Pennsylvania, U.S.
- Genre: Jazz
- Occupations: Musician, composer
- Instrument: Piano
- Years active: 1960s–present
- Website: www.kennybarron.com

Kenneth Barron (born June 9, 1943) is an American jazz pianist and composer who has appeared on hundreds of recordings as a leader and sideman, and is considered one of the most influential mainstream jazz pianists since the bebop era.

== Early life ==
Barron was born in Philadelphia, Pennsylvania. He had four siblings, including his eldest brother tenor saxophonist Bill Barron (1927–1989). Kenny Barron started playing piano at the age of 6 at his mother's insistence. "I hated it," he has said. "I wanted to be outside playing with the other kids. Eventually I did grow to love it." He studied with Vera Bryant, the sister of noted jazz pianist Ray Bryant and the mother of jazz guitarist Kevin Eubanks and jazz trombonist Robin Eubanks. At the age of 15, Barron played briefly with Mel Melvin's orchestra. In 1959, while still in school, Barron had local gigs with saxophonist Jimmy Heath. He also played a gig with Yusef Lateef two months before graduating from high school.

Barron cites Hank Jones and Tommy Flanagan as his principal influences. "It was their touch ... and their lyricism, and the way they phrased," he said. "It was like a rubber band, their phrasing, it was very loose, it wasn't rigid. An ebb-and-flow kind of thing. I loved that." He has also mentioned synthesizing the influence of Wynton Kelly, fellow Philadelphia pianist McCoy Tyner, Herbie Hancock, and "a bunch of other people."

== Later life and career ==
A few days after graduating, Barron set off on a week-long tour with Lateef. Seeking to further his musical career, Barron moved to New York City in 1961. He soon had a regular spot in saxophonist James Moody's band, and in the same year he was briefly a sideman with bands led by Lou Donaldson, Roy Haynes, and Lee Morgan. Barron then joined Dizzy Gillespie's band, with which he toured internationally between 1962 and 1966. Barron was briefly a member of The Jazztet around 1962 but did not record with them. In the 1960s, he also married and moved to Brooklyn.

After leaving Gillespie, Barron briefly performed with Stanley Turrentine before starting a three-year stint with Freddie Hubbard. He was then accompanist and arranger for vocalist Esther Marrow in 1970, after which he returned to Lateef for almost five years. He graduated in 1978 with a B.A. degree in arts from Empire State College (Metropolitan Center, New York City).

Barron co-led both the group Sphere, dedicated to performing the music of Thelonious Monk, from 1977 to 1988, and the Classical Jazz Quartet, which gave jazz performances of classical works, from 2001 to 2002.

Between 1986 and 1991, Barron recorded several albums with Stan Getz at the end of the great saxophonist's career, most notably Voyage (1986), Anniversary! (1987), Serenity (1987), Bossas & Ballads – The Lost Sessions (1989), and People Time: The Complete Recordings (1991), a 7-CD set. "It was great to work with him," Barron reflected. "I think we had an affinity for each other, because we're both intent on playing lyrically. That was my thing. That was his thing, as well. So we got along great." Getz reportedly said that Barron was his "favorite pianist of all time."

Barron has composed more than 50 works, the best known of which is "Voyage" (1986), which has been covered at least 75 times. Some other of his signature compositions that he and sometimes others have recorded multiple times include "Dolores Street SF" (1973), "Sunshower" (1975), "Spiral" (1982), "And Then Again" (1982), "Joanne Julia" (1984), "Phantoms" (1986), "What If?" (1986), "The Only One" (1990), and "Twilight Song" (1993). Although Barron is best known for interpretations of jazz standards, modern jazz classics, and originals, he has occasionally also recorded pop/rock material, including various Stevie Wonder songs and Sting's "Fragile".

Barron is also known as "a remarkably sensitive accompanist," recording with notable singers such as Ann Hampton Callaway, Abbey Lincoln, Kevin Mahogany, Helen Merrill, Jane Monheit, Judy Niemack, Dianne Reeves, and Carol Sloane. In addition, Barron contributed to the scores of several Spike Lee films, including Do the Right Thing (1989) and Malcolm X (1992).

Barron has been nominated 14 times for Grammy Awards and was inducted into the American Jazz Hall of Fame in 2005. He was also elected a Fellow of the American Academy of Arts and Sciences in 2009. In May 2010, Barron was awarded an Honorary Doctorate of Music from Berklee College of Music along with African-born singer/songwriter Angelique Kidjo, Spanish guitarist Paco de Lucia, and songwriting duo Leon Huff and Kenneth Gamble.

For more than 25 years, Barron taught piano and keyboard harmony at Rutgers University in New Jersey. He now teaches at the Juilliard School of Music. His piano students have included Earl MacDonald, Harry Pickens, Jon Regen, and Aaron Parks. In 2022, Barron was elected to the DownBeat Jazz Hall of Fame. In 2026 he was named Jazz Legacies Fellow by the Mellon Foundation

The Los Angeles Times called Barron "one of the top jazz pianists in the world," and Jazz Weekly named him the "most lyrical piano player of our time."

== Discography ==
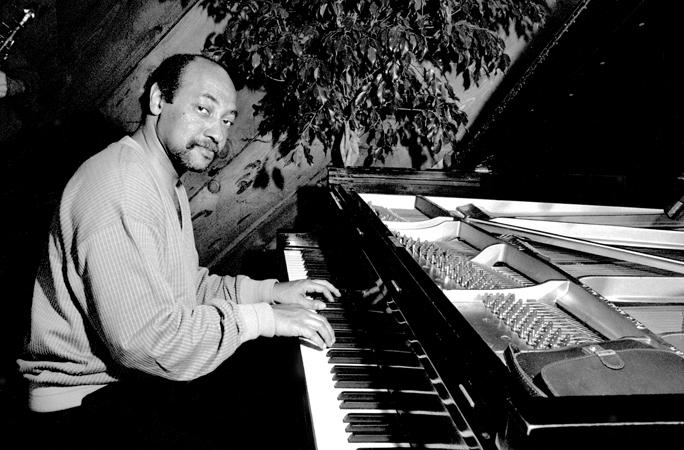
Barron in 1986

- You Had Better Listen (Atlantic, 1967) with Jimmy Owens
- Sunset to Dawn (Muse, 1973)
- Peruvian Blue (Muse, 1974)
- In Tandem (Muse, 1975 [1980]) with Ted Dunbar
- Lucifer (Muse, 1975)
- Innocence (Wolf, 1978)
- Together (Denon, 1978) with Tommy Flanagan
- Golden Lotus (Muse, 1980 [1982])
- Kenny Barron at the Piano (Xanadu, 1981 [1982])
- Imo Live (Whynot, 1982)
- Spiral (Baybridge, 1982)
- Green Chimneys (Criss Cross Jazz, 1983)
- 1+1+1 (BlackHawk, 1984 [1986]) with Ron Carter and Michael Moore
- Landscape (Baystate, 1984)
- Autumn in New York (Uptown, 1984) - reissued as New York Attitude
- Scratch (Enja, 1985)
- What If? (Enja, 1986)
- Two as One (Red, 1986) with Buster Williams
- The Red Barron Duo (Storyville, 1986 [1988]) with Red Mitchell
- Live at Fat Tuesdays (Enja, 1988)
- Rhythm-a-Ning (Candid, 1989) with John Hicks
- The Only One (Reservoir, 1990)
- Live at Maybeck Recital Hall Volume Ten (Concord Jazz, 1990)
- Invitation (Criss Cross Jazz, 1990)
- Lemuria-Seascape (Candid, 1991)
- Quickstep (Enja, 1991)
- The Moment (Reservoir, 1991 [1994])
- Confirmation (Candid, 1991) with Barry Harris
- Sambao (Verve, 1992)
- Other Places (Verve, 1993)
- Wanton Spirit (Verve, 1994) with Roy Haynes and Charlie Haden
- Things Unseen (Verve, 1995 [1997])
- Swamp Sally (Verve, 1995) with Mino Cinelu
- Live at Bradley's (EmArcy, 1996 [2001])
- Live at Bradley's II (Universal, 1996 [2005])
- Night and the City (Verve, 1996 [1998]) with Charlie Haden
- Spirit Song (Verve, 1999)
- Freefall (Verve, 2000) with Regina Carter
- Canta Brasil (Sunnyside, 2002)
- Images (Sunnyside, 2003)
- Super Standard (Venus, 2004)
- The Traveler (Sunnyside, 2007)
- Minor Blues (Venus, 2009)
- Kenny Barron & the Brazilian Knights (Sunnyside, 2012)
- The Art of Conversation (Impulse!, 2014) with Dave Holland
- Book of Intuition (Impulse!, 2016)
- Concentric Circles (Blue Note, 2018)
- Without Deception (Dare2, 2020) with Dave Holland
- The Source (Artwork, 2023)
- The Complete Two as One (Red, 2023) with Buster Williams
- Beyond This Place (Artwork, 2024)
