= Piccolo (album) =

1977 live album by Ron Carter Quartet

Live album by Ron Carter
- Released: 1977
- Recorded: March 25–26, 1977
- Venue: Sweet Basil, New York City
- Genre: Jazz
- Length: 75:55
- Label: Milestone; M-55004
- Producer: Orrin Keepnews

Ron Carter chronology
Pastels (1976)	Piccolo (1977)	Third Plane (1977)

Piccolo is a 1977 release by the Ron Carter Quartet, consisting of Ron Carter on piccolo bass, Kenny Barron on piano, Buster Williams on double bass, and Ben Riley on drums. The album was recorded live at Sweet Basil jazz club in New York City on March 25–26, 1977. Piccolo is considered one of Carter's best albums from the late 1970s due to its excellent recording, live-club feel, and exquisite musicianship. After being brought together by Carter and playing in his quartet for a few years, Barron, Williams, and Riley went on to form the band Sphere with Charlie Rouse.

== Reception ==
The AllMusic review by Scott Yanow stated "This double album is mostly recommended to lovers of bass solos [...] These performances, which are well-played, are almost all quite long, so listeners who prefer more variety in their music are advised to look elsewhere."

Professional ratings
Review scores
Source	Rating
AllMusic	4.5/5 stars
The Rolling Stone Jazz Record Guide	3/5 stars

== Track listing ==
All compositions by Ron Carter except as indicated

1. "Saguaro" – 18:25
2. "Sunshower" (Kenny Barron) – 15:17
3. "Three Little Words" (Harry Ruby, Bert Kalmar) – 8:46
4. "Laverne Walk" (Oscar Pettiford) – 12:24
5. "Little Waltz" – 8:15
6. "Tambien Conocido Como" – 12:59

Note: The original double LP vinyl issue also included the track "Blue Monk" – 6:13 as track 3. This was omitted from CD issues due to time constraints, but does appear on the Milestone label's compilation of '70s Carter material entitled Standard Bearers.

== Personnel ==
- Ron Carter – piccolo bass
- Kenny Barron – piano
- Buster Williams – bass
- Ben Riley – drums
