= Buster Williams =

American jazz bassist (born 1942)

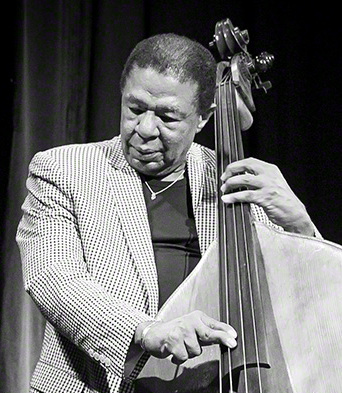
- Williams at Victoria during the 2016 Oslo Jazzfestival

Background information
- Born: Charles Anthony Williams; April 17, 1942 (age 84); Camden, New Jersey
- Genres: Jazz, jazz fusion
- Occupation: Musician
- Instrument: Double bass
- Years active: 1959–present
- Website: busterwilliams.com

Charles Anthony "Buster" Williams (born April 17, 1942) is an American jazz bassist. Williams is known for his membership in pianist Herbie Hancock's early 1970s group, as well as working with guitarist Larry Coryell, the Thelonious Monk repertory band Sphere and as the accompanist of choice for many singers, including Nancy Wilson.

== Biography ==
=== Early life and career ===
Williams' father, Charles Anthony Williams Sr., was a musician who played bass, drums and piano and had band rehearsals in the family home in Camden, New Jersey, exposing Williams to jazz at an early age. Williams was particularly inspired to focus on bass after hearing his father's record of "Stardust", performed by Oscar Pettiford, and started playing in his early teens.

Williams had his first professional gig while he was still a junior high school student, filling in for Charles Sr., who had double booked himself one evening. Williams later spent his days practicing with Sam Dockery, who was playing in Jimmy Heath's band in Philadelphia on a regular double bill with Sam Reed. Charles Sr. hosted a jam session at a club called Rip's and gave Williams the opportunity to put his own group together for a Monday night show in 1959. In an effort to work his way into Heath's band, Williams hired Sam Reed. The plan worked, as two days later Reed contacted Williams about playing in his band that coming Saturday, which demonstrated Williams' talent to Heath, who in turn hired Williams the following week.

Williams attended Camden High School. Just after graduating high school in 1960, Williams had the opportunity to play with Gene Ammons and Sonny Stitt when Nelson Boyd reached out to Charles Sr. to cover for him. Charles Sr. was also unable to make the gig and sent Buster in his stead. After the first set on a Friday night, Ammons and Stitt asked Williams to join the band on tour, starting in Chicago, after playing through the weekend in Philadelphia. Williams toured with them for about a year, from 1960 into 1961, until the group got stranded in Kansas City and was abandoned by Ammons, who fled without paying the band. The rhythm section managed to work with Al Hibbler for one week in order to earn enough for train fare to return home. Williams made his first two recordings with the Ammons/Stitt group in August 1961, Dig Him! for Argo Records and Boss Tenors for Verve, both recorded in Chicago.

=== Education ===
Williams attended Combs College of Music in Philadelphia irregularly during and after his tenure with the Ammons/Stitt group. He learned composition, syntax, harmony and theory from Dr. Roland Wiggins.

=== Vocal accompanist ===
Williams was hired by Dakota Staton after hearing him at a gig in Wilmington, Delaware with the Gerald Price Trio in 1961. This was closely followed by work with Betty Carter in 1962 and Sarah Vaughan in 1963. Vaughan took him on his first European tour, during which he connected with the Miles Davis Quintet on the French Riviera. In 1964, Williams formed a more lasting working relationship with Nancy Wilson, with whom he recorded several albums for Capitol Records, and as a result he moved to Los Angeles. Williams would go on to work with numerous other vocalists throughout his career, including Sathima Bea Benjamin, Shirley Horn, Betty Carter, Jonathan Schwartz, Carmen McRae, Roseanna Vitro, Helen Merrill, Nnenna Freelon, Jon Lucien, Marguerite Mariama and Champian Fulton.

=== West Coast ===
Williams' move to the West Coast facilitated touring and recording with Nancy Wilson as well as The Jazz Crusaders, with whom he recorded five albums for Pacific Jazz. According to Williams, he was "the number one sub for Ray Brown" during this time, playing with Kenny Dorham, recording a date with the Harold Land/Bobby Hutcherson quintet, and ultimately working with Miles Davis for several months in 1967.

=== Herbie Hancock Sextet ===
In October 1968, Williams moved to New York City and continued to work steadily, playing shows with Art Blakey, Herbie Mann and Mary Lou Williams, while recording for Atlantic, Blue Note and Prestige with artists such as McCoy Tyner, Dexter Gordon, Roy Ayers, Stanley Turrentine, Frank Foster, Illinois Jacquet and, once again, Gene Ammons (recently returned from a seven-year stint in Joliet). Having worked with Herbie Hancock in the Miles Davis Quintet, Williams became a fixture of Hancock's Mwandishi Sextet, recording three albums for Warner Bros., Sextant for Columbia, The Prisoner for Blue Note and two more, Realization and Inside Out, under Eddie Henderson's name for Capricorn. The Mwandishi Sextet explored new electronic sounds in jazz and featured Williams on both acoustic and electric bass.

=== Debut as leader ===
Buster Williams made his recording debut as leader in 1975 with the album Pinnacle for Muse Records and he went on to lead several more sessions for Muse, Denon and Buddah through 1980. He also backed Ron Carter on several recording dates which featured Carter soloing on piccolo bass. From the 1970s onward, Williams worked steadily as a sideman for Mary Lou Williams, Kenny Barron, Jimmy Rowles, Larry Coryell, Stanley Cowell, Steve Turre and Frank Morgan, among others. For 18 years between 1980 and 1998, Williams made only one record as leader, 1989's Something More, with Herbie Hancock, Wayne Shorter, Al Foster and trumpeter Shunzo Ono, featuring five original compositions by Williams. He continues to perform with a rotating lineup as Buster Williams' Something More, touring Europe in 2013 with Joey Baron, Eric Reed and saxophonist Bruce Williams. Beginning with Somewhere Along the Way in 1998, Williams increased his output as leader into the new century, notably recording Griot Libertè for HighNote in 2004, engineered, mixed and mastered by Rudy Van Gelder and released in the Hybrid SACD format with a 5.0 surround sound mix. In June 2008, Williams self-released Live Volume 1 exclusively as a digital download.

=== Further collaborations ===
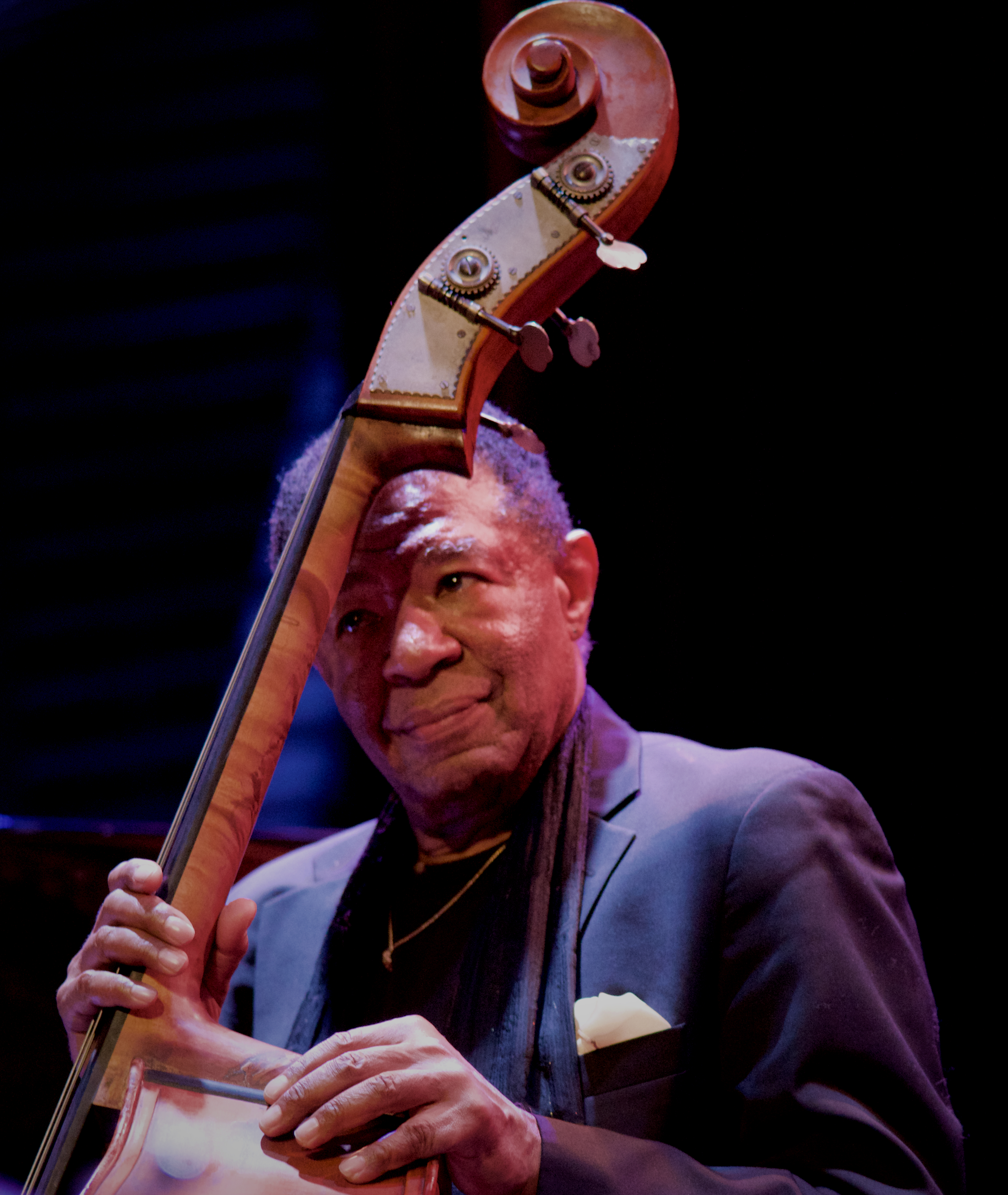
At BIM Amsterdam as a member of the Wallace Roney Quintet, 2015

At the 22nd Annual Grammy Awards in 1980, Williams was nominated for a Grammy Award for Best Jazz Instrumental Album for his work with Hank Jones and Tony Williams on Love for Sale, the first of Jones' records credited to The Great Jazz Trio. Williams also continued to tour with Herbie Hancock throughout the 1980s and 1990s and performed "'Round Midnight" at the 29th Annual Grammy Awards with Hancock, Tony Williams and Bobby McFerrin in 1987. 1982 saw Williams form two important collaborative ensembles, the Timeless All-Stars, a sextet featuring Harold Land, Curtis Fuller, Bobby Hutcherson, Cedar Walton and Billy Higgins, which recorded four albums for the Dutch label Timeless Records and Sphere, featuring Kenny Barron, Ben Riley, Charlie Rouse and later Gary Bartz. Sphere began as a tribute to Thelonious Monk, making their first recording for Elektra on February 17, 1982, the day Monk died, but soon incorporated the band members' own compositions along with other jazz standards.

=== Recent work ===
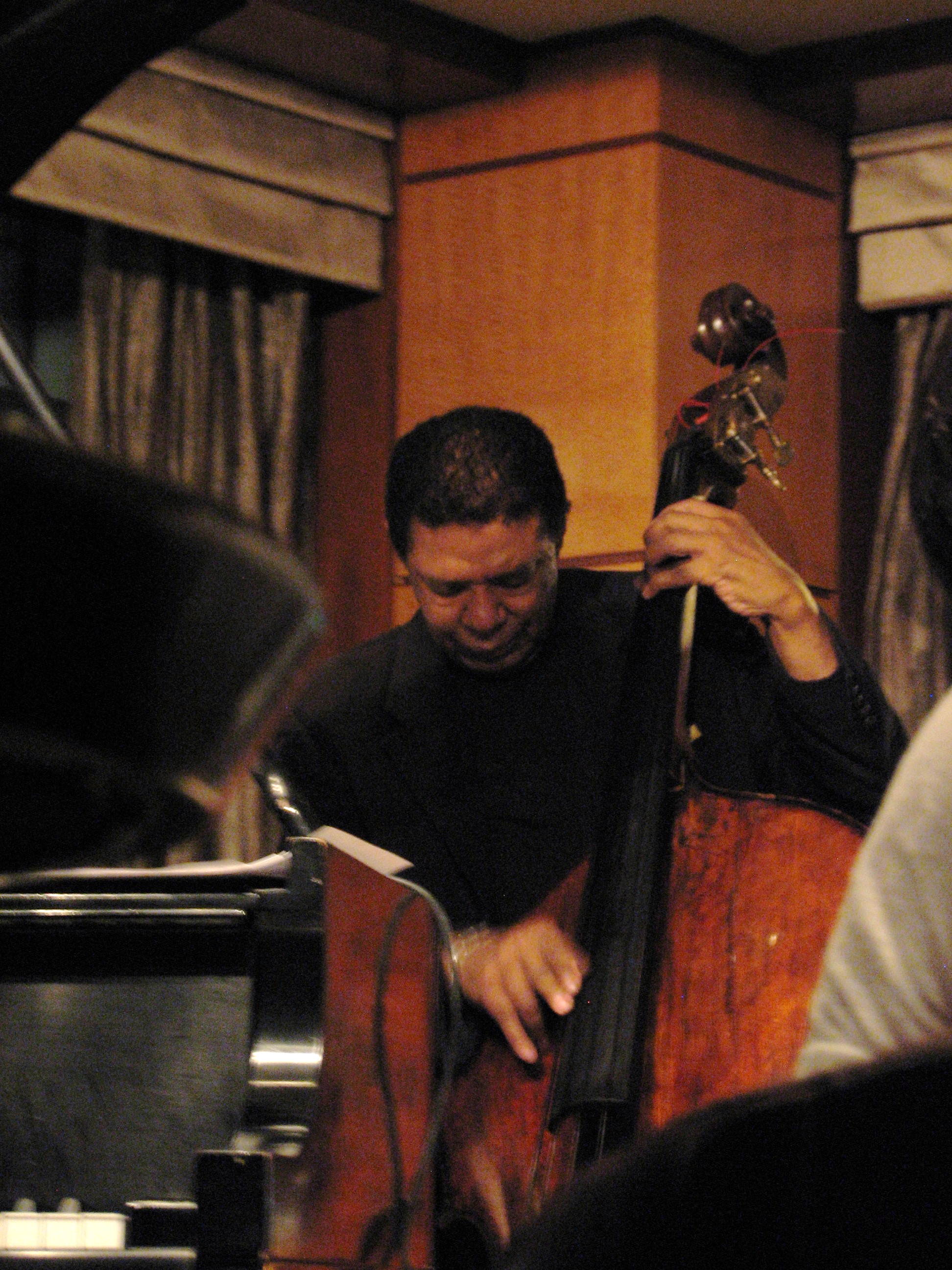
Williams performing in 2008.

From 2010 into 2014, Buster Williams toured with Sonny Fortune, Mike Stern and Jimmy Cobb as 4 Generations of Miles, named after a 2002 concert and recording for Chesky representing four different eras of Miles Davis bands. The original group featured Ron Carter and George Coleman in place of Williams and Fortune. The Buster Williams School of Music developed from a summer class Williams ran for the IDEA Performing Arts Center in Camden in 2012. Williams formed his own non-profit corporation to continue this work in 2013. Something More performed at the Portland Jazz Festival and Dimitriou's Jazz Alley in February 2014, this time consisting of Williams' former Mwandishi bandmates Bennie Maupin and Julian Priester, along with Cindy Blackman-Santana and George Colligan. Williams made a short tour of Europe in March 2014 as part of the Steve Kuhn trio with Billy Drummond.

== Film and television work ==
Williams worked on several film soundtracks and television commercials (including Coca-Cola, Budweiser and Old Spice) throughout his career. The 1969 film Mackenna's Gold featured Williams on the soundtrack working under Quincy Jones. Williams reunited with Ron Carter for Alain Corneau's 1981 film Choice of Arms, with music composed by Philippe Sarde and performed by the London Symphony Orchestra. In the 1990s, Williams worked with Angelo Badalamenti on David Lynch's Twin Peaks: Fire Walk with Me and with Terence Blanchard for the Spike Lee film Clockers. Williams made several television appearances as well, performing five of his own compositions with Branford Marsalis' The Tonight Show band and backing Erroll Garner during an earlier Tonight Show appearance. He appeared on The Andy Williams Show with Nancy Wilson, with Bill Cosby on The Joan Rivers Show and with Joe Williams on Sesame Street. Williams appeared as himself in the 2004 Steven Spielberg film The Terminal, playing in Benny Golson's quartet with Mike LeDonne and Carl Allen. In 2019, Buster Williams, From Bass to Infinity, a documentary film by Adam Kahan, was released about Williams' life, career and philosophy.

== Personal life ==
Williams was married in 1965 to Veronica, whom he met in junior high school, and as of 2014, he lives in Camden with his wife. Introduced to chanting Nam-myoho-renge-kyo by his sister in 1972, Williams and his wife took up the Nichiren Buddhist practice after she suffered a concussion in a car accident and he has continued the practice ever since as a member of the global Buddhist association Soka Gakkai International. His 2004 album Griot Libertè was inspired by another health crisis when Veronica recovered from a coma following a heart attack.

== Awards and honors ==
In addition to his Grammy nomination, Williams was awarded a National Endowment for the Arts grant for composition as well as a New York Foundation for the Arts Fellowship Grant in 1991. Williams has also been recognized by the Min-On Concert Association, RVC Corporation and Soka Gakkai International.

== Critical reception ==
The Penguin Guide to Jazz on CD declared Buster Williams "one of the key sidemen in modern jazz" with "a rock-solid grounding in harmony, counterpoint and orchestration." The guide observed that "Buster's harmony is impeccable and he has a rhythmic sense that is unfailing, feeling and utterly original." Critic Ron Wynn ranked the Mwandishi Sextet "among the finest jazz-rock and pop-tinged units of all time." Critic Thomas Conrad praised Williams' work as a leader in his DownBeat review of the 2001 album Houdini, stating that the album "could in fact be taken as a clinic for bassists on how to assume a more proactive, forward position in an ensemble without throwing it out of balance," and that "in [Williams'] hands, the bass is a fully articulate solo voice."

== Gear ==
Williams' instrument is a copy of a late-1800s Boosey & Hawkes Panormo, using La Bella strings and a Fishman BP-100 pickup, with a 1x15 Polytone Mini-Brute bass amp.

== Discography ==
=== As leader ===
- Pinnacle (Muse, 1975)
- Crystal Reflections (Muse, 1976)
- Tokudo (Denon, 1978)
- Heartbeat (Muse, 1978)
- Dreams Come True (Buddah, 1980)
- Two as One with Kenny Barron (Red, 1987) – live rec. 1986
- Something More (In+Out, 1989)
- Somewhere Along the Way (TCB, 1998)
- Lost in a Memory (TCB, 1999)
- Live at the Montreux Jazz Festival 1999 (TCB, 2001) – live rec. 1999
- Houdini (Sirocco Jazz Ltd., 2001)
- Joined at the Hip (TCB, 2002) – rec. 1998
- Griot Libertè (HighNote, 2004)
- 65 Roses (BluePort Jazz, 2008) – rec. 2006
- Buster Williams Live Volume 1 (Buster Williams, 2008)
- Audacity (Smoke Sessions, 2018)
- Unalome (Smoke Sessions, 2023)

=== As sideman ===
With Geri Allen

- The Gathering (Verve, 1998)
- Jazzpar Concerts 2003 (Stunt, 2006)

With Gene Ammons

- Dig Him! with Sonny Stitt (Argo, 1961) – also released as We'll Be Together Again (Prestige, 1968)
- Boss Tenors with Sonny Stitt (Verve, 1961)
- The Boss Is Back! (Prestige, 1969)
- Brother Jug! (Prestige, 1969)

With Roy Ayers

- Virgo Vibes (Atlantic, 1967)
- Daddy Bug (Atlantic, 1969)

With Angelo Badalamenti

- Twin Peaks: Fire Walk With Me (Warner Bros., 1992)
- Twin Peaks: Season Two Music and More with David Lynch (David Lynch Music Co., 2007)

With Chet Baker

- Chet Baker / Wolfgang Lackerschmid with Wolfgang Lackerschmid (Sandra Music Productions, 1979)
- Peace (Enja, 1982)

With Kenny Barron

- Innocence (Wolf, 1978)
- Golden Lotus (Muse, 1982) – rec. 1980
- Imo Live (Whynot, 1983) – live rec. 1982
- Green Chimneys (Criss Cross Jazz, 1984) – rec. 1983
- Two as One (Red, 1987) – live rec. 1986

With Sathima Bea Benjamin

- Windsong (Ekapa, 1985)
- Love Light (Enja, 1987)
- Southern Touch (Enja, 1989)
- SongSpirit (Ekapa, 2006)

With Art Blakey

- Art Blakey and the All Star Messengers (Jazz Line, 1982)
- The Art of Jazz: Live in Leverkusen (In+Out, 1989)

With Ron Carter

- Piccolo (Milestone, 1977)
- Peg Leg (Milestone, 1978)
- Pick 'Em (Milestone, 1980) – rec. 1978

With Cyrus Chestnut

- Natural Essence (HighNote, 2016)
- There's a Sweet, Sweet Spirit (HighNote, 2017)

With Norman Connors

- Dark of Light (Buddah, 1973)
- Love From The Sun (Buddah, 1973)

With Larry Coryell

- Equipoise (Muse, 1986) – rec. 1985
- Toku Do (Muse, 1988) – rec. 1987
- Air Dancing (Jazzpoint, 1988)
- Shining Hour (Muse, 1989)
- New High (HighNote, 2000)
- Cedars of Avalon (HighNote, 2002)

With Sonny Fortune

- Waves of Dreams (Horizon, 1976)
- Four in One (Blue Note, 1994)

With Benny Golson

- Voices All with The Jazztet (East World, 1982)
- Terminal 1 (Concord Jazz, 2004)
- New Time, New 'Tet (Concord Jazz, 2009)
- Horizon Ahead (HighNote, 2016)

With Dexter Gordon

- The Tower of Power! (Prestige, 1969)
- More Power! (Prestige, 1969)
- Tangerine (Prestige, 1972)
- Generation (Prestige, 1972)

With Herbie Hancock

- The Prisoner (Blue Note, 1969)
- Fat Albert Rotunda (Warner Bros., 1969)
- Mwandishi (Warner Bros., 1969)
- Crossings (Warner Bros., 1972)
- Sextant (Columbia, 1973)
- VSOP (Columbia, 1977)

With Billy Hart

- Enchance (Horizon, 1977)
- Rah (Gramavision, 1988)

With Eddie Henderson

- Realization (Capricorn, 1973)
- Inside Out (Capricorn, 1974)
- Sunburst (Blue Note, 1975)

With Buck Hill

- This Is Buck Hill (SteepleChase, 1978)
- Scope (SteepleChase, 1979)

With Shirley Horn

- A Lazy Afternoon (SteepleChase, 1979)
- You Won't Forget Me (Verve, 1991)

With Bobby Hutcherson

- Farewell Keystone (Theresa, 1982)
- In the Vanguard (Landmark, 1987)

With Abdullah Ibrahim

- African River (Enja, 1989)
- No Fear, No Die (TipToe, 1990)

With The Jazz Crusaders

- Uh Huh (Pacific Jazz, 1967)
- Lighthouse '68 (Pacific Jazz, 1968)
- The Festival Album (Pacific Jazz, 1968)
- Powerhouse (Pacific Jazz, 1969)
- Lighthouse '69 (Pacific Jazz, 1969)
- Give Peace a Chance (Liberty, 1970)

With Steve Kuhn

- Porgy (Evidence, 1988)
- Love Walked In (Venus, 2003)
- Plays Standards (Venus, 2007)

With Harold Land

- The Peace-Maker (Cadet, 1967)
- A New Shade of Blue (Mainstream, 1971)
- Damisi (Mainstream, 1972)

With Harold Mabern

- Workin' & Wailin' (Prestige, 1969)
- Greasy Kid Stuff! (Prestige, 1970)

With John McNeil

- Look to the Sky with Tom Harrell (SteepleChase, 1979)
- John McNeil, Faun (SteepleChase, 1981)

With Meeco

- Perfume e Caricias (Connector, 2010)
- Beauty of the Night (Connector, 2012)

With Frank Morgan

- Lament (Contemporary, 1986)
- Bebop Lives! (Contemporary, 1987)
- Mood Indigo (Antilles, 1989)

With David "Fathead" Newman

- Resurgence! (Muse, 1981)
- The Gift (HighNote, 2003)

With Houston Person

- The Big Horn (Muse, 1979) – rec. 1976
- Very PERSONal (Muse, 1981) – rec. 1980
- The Talk of the Town (Muse, 1987)

With Wallace Roney

- No Room for Argument (Stretch, 2000)
- A Place in Time (HighNote, 2016)

With Jimmy Rowles

- Paws That Refresh (Choice, 1980)
- The Chess Players (Candid, 2010) – rec. 1976

With Hilton Ruiz

- Piano Man (SteepleChase, 1975)
- Excition (SteepleChase, 1977)
- Steppin' Into Beauty (SteepleChase, 1982) – rec. 1977

With Woody Shaw

- The Moontrane (Muse, 1974)
- Woody III (Columbia, 1979)
- Setting Standards (Muse, 1983)

With Sphere

- Four in One (Elektra/Musician, 1982)
- Flight Path (Elektra/Musician, 1983)
- Sphere on Tour (Red, 1985)
- Pumpkin's Delight (Red, 1993) – rec. 1986
- Four for All (Verve, 1987)
- Bird Songs (Verve, 1988)
- Sphere (Verve, 1997)

With Buddy Terry

- Awareness (Mainstream, 1971)
- Pure Dynamite (Mainstream, 1972)

With The Timeless All Stars

- It's Timeless (Timeless, 1982)
- Timeless Heart (Timeless, 1983)
- Essence (Delos, 1986)
- Time for the Timeless All Stars (Early Bird, 1991)

With Steve Turre

- Fire and Ice (Stash, 1988)
- Right There (Antilles, 1991)
- Lotus Flower (Verve, 1999)
- TNT (Trombone-N-Tenor) (Telarc, 2001)
- The Spirits Up Above (HighNote, 2004)

With Stanley Turrentine

- Another Story (Blue Note, 1970) – rec. 1969
- The Man with the Sad Face (Fantasy, 1976)

With McCoy Tyner

- Asante (Blue Note, 1974) – rec. 1970
- Sama Layuca (Milestone, 1974)

With Michal Urbaniak

- Music for Violin and Jazz Quartet (Jam, 1980)
- Jazz Legends (Ubx, 1998)

With Cedar Walton

- Among Friends (Evidence, 1990) – live rec. 1982 at Keystone Korner
- Voices Deep Within (HighNote, 2009)

With Mary Lou Williams

- Free Spirits (SteepleChase, 1975)
- My Mama Pinned a Rose on Me (Pablo, 1977)

With Nancy Wilson

- Hollywood - My Way (Capitol, 1963)
- The Nancy Wilson Show! (Capitol, 1965)
- Lush Life (Capitol, 1967)
- Welcome to My Love (Capitol, 1968)
- Hurt So Bad (Capitol, 1969)

With Denny Zeitlin

- As Long As There's Music (Venus, 1997)
- Slickrock (MAXJAZZ, 2004)
- Trio in Concert (Sunnyside, 2009)
- Stairway to the Stars (Sunnyside, 2014) – rec. 2001 at The Jazz Bakery

With Others

- Franco Ambrosetti, Wings (Enja, 1984)
- Ben Aronov, Bob Brookmeyer and Tom Harrell, Shadow Box (Choice, 1979)
- Bill Barron, Jazz Caper (Muse, 1982)
- Gary Bartz, Episode One: Children of Harlem (Challenge, 1994)
- Cindy Blackman, Arcane (Muse, 1988)
- Hamiet Bluiett, Dangerously Suite (Soul Note, 1981)
- Donald Brown, Sources of Inspiration (Muse, 1989)
- Ted Brown, In Good Company with Jimmy Raney (Criss Cross, 1985)
- Will Calhoun, Native Lands (Half Note, 2005)
- Betty Carter, The Betty Carter Album (Bet-Car, 1976)
- Billy Childs, Skim Coat (Metropolitan, 1999)
- Cyrus Chestnut, Black Nile (Grave News, 2008)
- Freddy Cole, It's Crazy, But I'm in Love (After 9, 1997)
- Junior Cook, Somethin's Cookin' (Muse, 1982)
- Stanley Cowell, We Three (DIW, 1987)
- Jaiman Crunk, Encounters (Origin, 2012)
- Albert Dailey, That Old Feeling (SteepleChase, 1978)
- Miles Davis, Sorcerer (Columbia, 1967)
- Walter Davis Jr., Illumination (Denon, 1977)
- Kenny Drew, Third Phase (Jazz City, 1989)
- Cornell Dupree, Saturday Night Fever (Versatile, 1977)
- Teddy Edwards, Midnight Creeper (HighNote, 1997)
- Kevin Eubanks, Opening Night (GRP, 1985)
- Gil Evans, Lunar Eclypse (Robi Droli, 1992) – live
- Joe Farrell, Outback (CTI, 1971)
- Bruce Forman, The Bash (Muse, 1982)
- Sonny Fortune, Four in One (Blue Note, 1994)
- Frank Foster, Manhattan Fever (Blue Note, 1968)
- Rebecca Coupe Franks, Suit of Armor (Justice, 1992)
- Nnenna Freelon, Nnenna Freelon (Columbia, 1992)
- Chico Freeman, Peaceful Heart, Gentle Spirit (Contemporary, 1980)
- Carlos Garnett, Black Love (Muse, 1974)
- Stan Getz and Jimmie Rowles, The Peacocks (Columbia, 1975)
- Benny Green, In This Direction (Criss Cross, 1989)
- Grant Green, Easy (Versatile, 1978)
- Charles Greenlee, I Know About the Life (Baystate, 1977)
- Winard Harper, Be Yourself (Epicure, 1994)
- Beaver Harris, 360°Experience - A Well-Kept Secret (Shemp, 1980)
- Heads of State, Search for Peace (Smoke Sessions, 2015)
- Albert Heath, Kawaida (O'Be, 1970)
- Joan Hickey, Soulmates (Chicago Lakeside Jazz, 1998)
- John Hicks, On the Wings of an Eagle (Chesky, 2006)
- Billy Higgins, Bridgework (Contemporary, 1987)
- Freddie Hubbard, Outpost (Enja, 1981)
- Robert Irving III, New Momentum (Sonic Portraits, 2007)
- Illinois Jacquet, The Blues; That's Me! (Prestige, 1969)
- Etta Jones, Ms. Jones to You (Muse, 1976)
- Hank Jones and Tony Williams, Love for Sale (East Wind, 1976) – as The Great Jazz Trio
- Willie Jones, III, Groundwork (Wj3, 2016)
- Rahsaan Roland Kirk, The Return of the 5000 Lb. Man (Warner Bros., 1975)
- Eric Kloss, Essence (Muse, 1973)
- Lee Konitz, Yes, Yes, Nonet (SteepleChase, 1979)
- Prince Lasha and Sonny Simmons, Firebirds (Contemporary, 1968)
- Jeff Lederer, Sunwatcher (Jazzheads, Inc., 2011)
- Charles Lloyd, Acoustic Masters I (Atlantic, 1994)
- Jon Lucien, Mother Nature's Son (Mercury, 1993)
- Marguerite Mariama, Wild Women Never Get the Blues... Well, Not Anymore! (From The Inside Out, 2006)
- Branford Marsalis, Renaissance (Columbia, 1986)
- Bennie Maupin, The Jewel in the Lotus (ECM, 1974)
- Tom McIntosh, With Malice Toward None (IPO, 2004)
- Ken McIntyre, Open Horizon (SteepleChase, 1976)
- Carlos McKinney, Up-Front (Sirocco, 1997)
- René McLean, Watch Out (SteepleChase, 1975)
- Charles McPherson, McPherson's Mood (Prestige, 1969)
- Carmen McRae, I'm Coming Home Again (Buddah, 1980)
- Helen Merrill and Gil Evans Collaboration (EmArcy, 1988)
- Ralph Moore, 623 C Street (Criss Cross, 1987)
- James Morrison and Adam Makowicz, Swiss Encounter (EastWest, 1989)
- Sam Morrison, Dune (Inner City, 1976)
- Alphonse Mouzon, The Essence of Mystery (Blue Note, 1972)
- Tiger Onitsuka, A Time in New York (Savoy, 2008)
- Nathen Page, Page-Ing Nathen (Hugo's Music, 1982)
- Cecil Payne, Bird Gets the Worm (Muse, 1976)
- Emily Remler, East To Wes (Concord,1988)
- Ben Riley, Weaver of Dreams (Joken, 1996)
- Claudio Roditi, Free Wheelin': The Music of Lee Morgan (Reservoir, 1994)
- Red Rodney, Red, White and Blues (Muse, 1978)
- Roots, Saying Something (In+Out, 1995)
- Renee Rosnes, Without Words (Blue Note, 1993)
- Charlie Rouse, The Upper Manhattan Jazz Society with Benny Bailey (Enja, 1985)
- Carl Saunders, Out of the Blue (SNL, 1995)
- Jim Schapperoew, This One's For Pearle (Kerralee, 1980)
- Jonathan Schwartz, Sings Arthur Schwartz (Muse, 1977)
- Jimmy Smith, Go for Watcha' Know (Blue Note, 1986)
- Dr. Lonnie Smith, The Turbanator (32 Jazz, 2000)
- Charles Sullivan, Re-Entry (WhyNot, 1976)
- Charles Tolliver, Connect (Gearbox, 2020)
- Sarah Vaughan, Sassy Swings the Tivoli (Mercury, 1963) – live
- Roseanna Vitro, Listen Here (Texas Rose, 1984)
- Chip White, Harlem Sunset (Postcards, 1994)
- Lenny White, George Colligan and Steve Wilson, Hancock Island: The Music of Herbie Hancock (Chesky, 2008)
- James Williams, The Arioso Touch (Concord Jazz, 1982)
- The Mary Lou Williams Collective, Zodiac Suite: Revisited (Mary, 2006)
- Larry Willis, The Big Push (HighNote, 2006)
- Piotr Wojtasik, Quest (Power Bros, 1997)
