= Pumpkin's Delight =

Live album by Sphere
- Released: 1993
- Recorded: July 14, 1986
- Venue: Teatro Morlacchi, Perugia, Italy
- Genre: Jazz
- Length: 50:10
- Label: Red; 123 207
- Producer: Alberto Alberti and Sergio Veschi

Sphere chronology
Sphere on Tour (1985)	Pumpkin's Delight (1993)	Four for All (1987)

Kenny Barron chronology
Two as One (1986)	Pumpkin's Delight (1986)	The Red Barron Duo (1986)

Pumpkin's Delight is a live album by the group Sphere featuring saxophonist Charlie Rouse, pianist Kenny Barron, bassist Buster Williams, and drummer Ben Riley. Recorded at the Teatro Morlacchi in Perugia, Italy, as part of the 1986 Umbria Jazz Festival, it released on the Italian Red label. The 1993 CD edition features four tracks first released on LP in 1987 as Live at Umbria Jazz.

== Reception ==
Professional ratings
Review scores
Source	Rating
AllMusic	4/5 stars

In his review on AllMusic, Ron Wynn noted: "This 1986 concert by the quartet Sphere is one of the short-lived group's high points ... Recommended."

== Track listing ==
1. "Pumpkin's Delight" (Charlie Rouse) – 12:05
2. "Toku Do" (Buster Williams) – 11:00
3. "Saud's Song" (Kenny Barron) – 10:40
4. "Christina" (Williams) – 9:10
5. "Deceptakon" (Williams) – 11:40

== Personnel ==
- Charlie Rouse – tenor saxophone
- Kenny Barron – piano
- Buster Williams – bass
- Ben Riley – drums
