= 65 Roses =

65 Roses may refer to:

- 65 Roses (album), a 2008 live album by Buster Williams Trio
- "65 Roses" (song), a 2001 song by Lee J Collier
