= Sphere (album) =

Studio album by Sphere
- Released: 1998
- Recorded: October 4, 1997
- Studio: Acoustic Recording, Brooklyn, New York; Van Gelder Studios, Englewood Cliffs, New Jersey
- Genre: Jazz
- Length: 56:03
- Label: Verve; 557 796-2
- Producer: Sphere

Sphere chronology
Bird Songs (1988)	Sphere (1998)

Sphere is an album by the American jazz group Sphere. It was recorded on October 4, 1997, in New York City and New Jersey, and was released in 1998 by Verve. The album features saxophonist Gary Bartz, replacing original band member Charlie Rouse, who died in 1988, pianist Kenny Barron, bassist Buster Williams, and drummer Ben Riley. Sphere was the group's first album since 1988's Bird Songs.

== Reception ==
Professional ratings
Review scores
Source	Rating
AllMusic	2.5/5 stars

In a review for AllMusic, David R. Adler wrote: "While the repertoire is interesting... the band comes across as tame and traditional. The sparks that routinely fly during Sphere's live performances appear to be missing here."

Owen Cordle of Jazz Times stated that the album is "solid but seems more conservative than its predecessors," and noted: "good playing is ageless, and this certainly is good playing."

Writing for All About Jazz, Ian Nicolson commented: "the coalition of three of the most celebrated 'supportive' players and the adventurous, raw-toned Bartz generates a rich, multi-layered and swinging music that draws even more impact from outstanding engineering and mastering. Buster Williams' cashmere and cedar bass notes are particularly well-served, and the soundscape skilfully bridges the gap between conveying intimate sonic detail and capturing potent ensemble playing." AAJ's C. Michael Bailey remarked: "Bartz's addition to the group is as appropriate as was Ron Woods addition to the Rolling Stones after the departure of Mick Taylor. A perfect fit. This is a very fine jazz recording, that some how makes me think of the Modern Jazz Quartet. Tastefulness is always tasteful."

== Track listing ==
1. "We See" (Thelonious Monk) – 8:29
2. "Isfahan" (Billy Strayhorn) – 8:15
3. "Uncle Bubba" (Gary Bartz) – 6:19
4. "Hornin' In" (Thelonious Monk) – 8:27
5. "Buck and Wing" (Gary Bartz) – 7:52
6. "Twilight" (Kenny Barron) – 9:19
7. "The Surrey with the Fringe on Top" (Oscar Hammerstein, Richard Rodgers) – 7:22

== Personnel ==
- Gary Bartz – alto saxophone
- Kenny Barron – piano
- Buster Williams – bass
- Ben Riley – drums
