= Four for All =

Studio album by Sphere
- Released: 1987
- Recorded: March 2, 1987
- Studio: Van Gelder Studio, Englewood Cliffs, NJ
- Genre: Jazz
- Length: 56:29
- Label: Verve; 831 674-1
- Producer: Joanne Klein & Sphere

Sphere chronology
Pumpkin's Delight (1986)	Four for All (1987)	Bird Songs (1988)

Kenny Barron chronology
Now Was the Time (1986)	Four for All (1987)	Live at Fat Tuesdays (1988)

Four for All is an album by the group Sphere featuring saxophonist Charlie Rouse, pianist Kenny Barron, bassist Buster Williams, and drummer Ben Riley which was recorded in 1983 and released on the Verve label.

== Reception ==
Professional ratings
Review scores
Source	Rating
AllMusic	4/5 stars

On UPI, Ken Frankling wrote "This, Sphere's finest album, highlights the vast difference between a pick-up group and a band that was meant to play together. Sphere is one of the best small jazz bands around". In his review on AllMusic, Ken Dryden states "Although Sphere was initially formed by Kenny Barron, Buster Williams, Charlie Rouse, and Ben Riley to honor Thelonious Monk, their repertoire expanded far beyond his compositions. There is only one piece by Monk included here, a very playful arrangement of "San Francisco Holiday" (or "Worry Later," as it was tentatively titled by Riverside producer Orrin Keepnews when it was first recorded by Monk). Barron's samba "Baiana" proves to be a lively opener, while "Lunacy" is a tense post-bop chart that inspires some of the group's best playing on the date. Rouse's upbeat "Bittersweet," Williams' moody ballad "Air Dance," and the bassist's calypso-flavored "Lupe" are also tasty originals. "This Time the Dream's on Me" is the only standard, but the call-and-response intro between Williams and the rest of the quartet and Rouse's joyous tenor sax make it a memorable interpretation. Duke Ellington's infrequently played "Melancholia" is simply breathtaking, as Barron's consummate voicings blend beautifully with Rouse's bittersweet sax".

== Track listing ==
1. "Baiana" (Kenny Barron) – 7:49
2. "Bittersweet" (Charlie Rouse) – 6:00
3. "Lunacy" (Barron) – 8:02
4. "Air Dance" (Buster Williams) – 7:59 Bonus track on CD
5. "San Francisco Holiday (Worry Later)" (Thelonious Monk) – 7:16
6. "Lupe" (Williams) – 9:21
7. "This Time the Dream's on Me" (Harold Arlen, Johnny Mercer) – 5:32
8. "Melancholia" (Duke Ellington) – 4:30 Bonus track on CD

== Personnel ==
- Charlie Rouse – tenor saxophone
- Kenny Barron – piano
- Buster Williams – bass
- Ben Riley – drums
