= Weaver of Dreams =

Weaver of Dreams may refer to:

- Weaver of Dreams (Kenny Burrell album), 1961
- Weaver of Dreams (Ben Riley album), 1996

== See also ==
- A Weaver of Dreams, a lost 1918 silent film
