= Onitsuka =

Onitsuka (written: 鬼束) is a Japanese surname. Notable people with the surname include:

- Chihiro Onitsuka (鬼束 ちひろ, born 1980), Japanese singer-songwriter
- Tiger Onitsuka (鬼束 大我, born 1998), Japanese jazz drummer
- Kihachiro Onitsuka (鬼塚喜八郎 1918–2007), Japanese entrepreneur

== See also ==
- Onitsuka Tiger, a Japanese shoe company
