= Two as One =

Live album by Kenny Barron and Buster Williams
- Released: 1987
- Recorded: July 1986
- Venues: Umbria Jazz Festival, Perugia, Italy
- Genre: Jazz
- Length: 51:04
- Labels: Red; RR 214
- Producers: Alberto Alberti and Sergio Veschi

Kenny Barron chronology
What If? (1986)	Two as One (1987)	Pumpkin's Delight (1986)

Buster Williams chronology
Dreams Come True (1978)	Two as One (1986)	Something More (1989)

Two as One is a live album by pianist Kenny Barron and bassist Buster Williams recorded at the Teatro Morlacchi in Perugia, Italy as part of the 1986 Umbria Jazz Festival and released on the Italian Red label.

== Reception ==
Professional ratings
Review scores
Source	Rating
Allmusic	4/5 stars

In his review on Allmusic, Ken Dryden noted "Since the two had worked together on a number of recording sessions previously, they were very familiar with each other's skills and they mesh very well on all five of the standards on this date. Williams is not a mere accompanist but a musical equal who finds interesting paths when the pianist is in the lead. Barron's inventive approach to these chestnuts is always inventive ... This rewarding date should be considered essential". On All About Jazz, reviewer C. Michael Bailey stated "This duet clinic included everything a student of the genre would need to know. The vehicles are a collection of lengthy standards, all well played. Barron and Williams allow one another to stretch out with a great effect".

== Track listing ==
1. "All of You" (Cole Porter) - 11:08
2. "This Time the Dream's on Me" (Harold Arlen, Johnny Mercer) - 11:31
3. "Someday My Prince Will Come" (Frank Churchill, Larry Morey) - 3:58
4. "I Love You" (Porter) - 15:53
5. "My Funny Valentine" (Richard Rodgers, Lorenz Hart) - 8:34

== Personnel ==
- Kenny Barron – piano
- Buster Williams – bass
