= Imo Live =

Live album by Kenny Barron Trio
- Released: 1983
- Recorded: June 9, 1982
- Venue: Imo House, Nakano Minami Guchi, Tokyo
- Genre: Jazz
- Length: 54:28
- Label: Whynot; PAP 25032
- Producer: Masahiko Yuh

Kenny Barron chronology
Four in One (1982)	Imo Live (1983)	Spiral (1982)

Imo Live is a live album by pianist Kenny Barron that was recorded in Japan in 1982 and first released on the Whynot label in 1983 before being reissued on CD by Candid Records in 2010 as Live.

== Reception ==
Professional ratings
Review scores
Source	Rating
Allmusic	4/5 stars

In his review on Allmusic, Ken Dryden stated: "Kenny Barron's star began to rise rapidly in the 1980s, though trio dates such as this live set from Imo House in Tokyo ... the pianist pulls all stops in this outstanding date. Barron is known for playing lengthy (yet never overly long) numbers in front of audiences; this evening is no exception, as the tunes average around 14 minutes each ... fans of the amazing Kenny Barron should make every effort to acquire it"

== Track listing ==
1. "And Then Again" (Kenny Barron) – 12:08
2. "Manhã de Carnaval" (Luiz Bonfá, Antônio Maria) – 14:20
3. "Rhythm-a-Ning" (Thelonious Monk) – 14:17
4. "Someday My Prince Will Come" (Frank Churchill, Larry Morey) – 13:43

(313) 314-2863(313) 314-2863bcxAs

== Personnel ==
- Kenny Barron – piano
- Buster Williams – bass
- Ben Riley – drums
