= Parade (Ron Carter album) =

Studio album by Ron Carter
- Released: 1980
- Recorded: March 1979
- Studio: Van Gelder Studio, Englewood Cliffs, NJ
- Genre: Jazz
- Length: 36:19
- Label: Milestone; M-9088
- Producer: Ron Carter for Retrac Productions

Ron Carter chronology
Pick 'Em (1978)	Parade (1980)	New York Slick (1979)

Parade is an album by bassist Ron Carter that was recorded at Van Gelder Studio in 1979 and released on the Milestone label the following year.

== Reception ==
Professional ratings
Review scores
Source	Rating
AllMusic	4/5 stars
DownBeat	4.5/5 stars

The AllMusic review by Ron Wynn stated: "Bassist Carter heads a sterling mid-sized band with three trumpeters and saxophonists and two trombones. He handles the job of being both the primary and secondary rhythm support, while guests Joe Henderson, Jon Faddis, and Frank Wess, among others, provide some standout solos. The ensemble interaction clicks as well."

DownBeat assigned the album 4 stars. Reviewer Sam Freedman wrote,"Parade is the album Ron Carter has been making, or meaning to make, for years". Freedman praises Carter's writing, arranging, soloing, and management of the group.

== Track listing ==
All compositions by Ron Carter except where noted

1. "Parade" – 9:01
2. "A Theme in 3/4" – 5:54
3. "Sometimes I Feel Like a Motherless Child" (Traditional) – 2:46
4. "Tinderbox" – 5:07
5. "Gypsy" – 8:41
6. "G.J.T." – 4:48

== Personnel ==
- Ron Carter – piccolo bass, bass, arranger
- Joe Henderson – tenor saxophone (tracks 1, 2 & 4–6)
- Chick Corea – piano (tracks 1, 2 & 4–6)
- Tony Williams – drums (tracks 1, 2 & 4–6)
- Jon Faddis, John Frosk, Joe Shepley – trumpet, flugelhorn (tracks 1–4 & 6)
- Urbie Green – trombone (tracks 1–4 & 6)
- Tom Malone – bass trombone (tracks 1–4 & 6)
- Jerry Dodgion – flute, clarinet, alto saxophone (tracks 1–4 & 6)
- Frank Wess – flute, clarinet, tenor saxophone (tracks 1–4 & 6)
- Wade Marcus – horn arranger and conductor (tracks 1–4 & 6)
