= Buster Williams, From Bass to Infinity =

2019 documentary on jazz bassist

Buster Williams: Bass to Infinity is a documentary film about renowned jazz bassist, Buster Williams. Created and directed by Adam Kahan, the documentary was released in 2019. The film shows rare jazz improv with legendary Buster Williams and other jazz greats including Herbie Hancock and Rufus Reid, an interview with bassist Christian McBride, and footage with Nancy Wilson and Sarah Vaughan with whom Williams accompanied during his early years. Animation weaves through depicting Williams' entry into the world of jazz and performances on the road.

The film also shows Williams' personal life, especially his membership with the Soka Gakkai Movement and his practice of Nichiren Buddhism.

Due to the COVID-19 pandemic the festival releases were truncated. The film screened had its West Coast Premiere at the International Buddhist Film Festival in San Rafael, CA in December 2021. The Blu-Ray disc is scheduled to be released in 2022.
