= Bird Songs (Sphere album) =

Studio album by Sphere
- Released: 1988
- Recorded: March 12, 1988
- Studio: Van Gelder Studio, Englewood Cliffs, NJ
- Genre: Jazz
- Length: 52:39
- Label: Verve; 837 032-1
- Producer: Joanne Klein & Sphere

Sphere chronology
Four for All (1987)	Bird Songs (1988)	Sphere (1997)

Kenny Barron chronology
Live at Fat Tuesdays (1988)	Bird Songs (1988)	Rhythm-a-Ning (1989)

Bird Songs is an album by the group Sphere featuring saxophonist Charlie Rouse, pianist Kenny Barron, bassist Buster Williams, and drummer Ben Riley that was recorded in 1988 and released on the Verve label. The album features compositions written by or associated with Charlie Parker and was Charlie Rouse's last recording with the group prior to his death.

== Reception ==
Professional ratings
Review scores
Source	Rating
AllMusic	4.5/5 stars

In his review on AllMusic, Stephen Cook states: "the band comes up with one of their finest releases and one of the most classic hard bop sessions since the heyday of Blue Note's '60s records. Rouse, fittingly enough, is in top form throughout, coming up with a bevy of rich and mature solo statements. Barron avails himself nicely as well. Highly recommended".

== Track listing ==
All tracks are written by Charlie Parker except where noted.

No.	Title	Length
1.	"Red Cross"	5:50
2.	"I Didn't Know What Time It Was" (Richard Rodgers/Lorenz Hart)	10:29
3.	"Dewey Square"	6:47
4.	"Moose the Mooche"	5:41
5.	"Barbados"	5:08
6.	"Ah-Leu-Cha"	5:48
7.	"Quasimodo"	5:15
8.	"Just Friends" (John Klenner/Sam M. Lewis)	7:41

== Personnel ==
- Charlie Rouse – tenor saxophone
- Kenny Barron – piano
- Buster Williams – bass
- Ben Riley – drums
