= 65 Roses (album) =

Live album by Buster Williams Trio
- Released: November 1, 2008
- Recorded: September 9, 2006
- Venues: Mountain View Center for the Performing Arts, Mountain View, CA
- Genre: Jazz
- Length: 53:07
- Labels: BluePort Jazz; BP-J016
- Producer: Michael Silver

Buster Williams chronology
Griot Libertè (2004)	65 Roses (2008)	Buster Williams Live Volume 1 (2008)

65 Roses is a live album by bassist Buster Williams' Trio recorded in 2006 and released on the BluePort Jazz label.

== Reception ==
Professional ratings
Review scores
Source	Rating
AllMusic	4.5/5 stars

The AllMusic review by Ken Dryden said "Buster Williams leads a trio with pianist Kenny Barron and drummer Lenny White in this live concert that was held as a benefit for Cystic Fibrosis Research, Inc. Williams and Barron had worked together on many occasions prior to this date, appearing on each others' albums and working together in the quartet Sphere, while White is equally at home in mainstream jazz and fusion, having worked with numerous leaders".

== Track listing ==
All compositions by Kenny Barron except where noted

1. "We See" (Thelonious Monk) – 9:30
2. "Concierto de Aranjuez" (Joaquín Rodrigo) – 9:31
3. "Song for Abdullah" – 7:30
4. "Related to One" (Buster Williams) – 7:32
5. "Nikara's Song" – 9:06
6. "Surrey with the Fringe on Top" (Richard Rodgers, Oscar Hammerstein II) – 9:58

== Personnel ==
- Buster Williams - bass
- Kenny Barron – piano
- Lenny White – drums
