= Third Plane =

Studio album by Ron Carter
- Released: 1977
- Recorded: July 13, 1977
- Studio: The Automatt, San Francisco
- Genre: Post-bop
- Length: 39:40
- Label: Milestone
- Producer: Ron Carter

Ron Carter chronology
Piccolo (1977)	Third Plane (1977)	Peg Leg (1977)

Professional ratings
Review scores
Source	Rating
AllMusic	2.5/5 stars
The Penguin Guide to Jazz Recordings	4/4 stars

Third Plane is an album by jazz bassist Ron Carter, released on the Milestone label in 1977. It features performances by Carter, Herbie Hancock and Tony Williams.

A second selection of five tracks recorded by the trio during the same day's sessions was released under Herbie Hancock's name as Herbie Hancock Trio.

== Music ==
Jazz writer Thomas Owens highlighted aspects of Carter's playing that are noticeable on the album: "It is a treasure trove of pizzicato techniques: portamento effects, vibrato, double stops (including parallel octaves), harmonics, the most legato pizzicato lines in jazz, and those beautiful long notes on the lowest (E) string – notes whose overtone mix evolves continuously as the notes ring."

The Penguin Guide to Jazz hailed the group as "a killer band" and wrote that the album was "easily Carter's most impressive showing under his own name. There is a good deal of solo bass material, as one would expect, but all of it makes sense in context and is so well constructed and executed that it never palls."

== Track listing ==
1. "Third Plane" (Carter) – 5:53
2. "Quiet Times" (Carter) – 7:52
3. "Lawra" (Tony Williams) – 6:08
4. "Stella by Starlight" (Ned Washington, Victor Young) – 8:26
5. "United Blues" (Carter) – 3:01
6. "Dolphin Dance" (Herbie Hancock) – 8:20

== Personnel ==
- Ron Carter – bass
- Herbie Hancock – piano
- Tony Williams – drums
