= Don Joseph =

- Born: Don Joseph; April 13, 1923
- Origin: New York City
- Died: March 12, 1994 (aged 70)
- Genres: Jazz
- Occupations: Musician, trumpet player
- Instruments: Trumpet, cornet
- Years active: 1940–1994

Donald Frederick Joseph (April 13, 1923 – March 12, 1994) was an American jazz musician. He played trumpet and cornet.

Joseph raised in Staten Island and had an own quintet in the 1940s, where alto saxophonist Manny Albam had his first professional gig; At the end of the decade Joseph worked with big band leaders Buddy Rich, Alvino Rey, and Lucky Millinder. He kept a low profile in New York City in the 1950s, sitting in at clubs where he and Tony Fruscella sometimes jammed together. In 1950 he played in the rehearsal band of Gene Roland with Charlie Parker (It's A Wonderful World); in 1953 he was involved in sessions with pianist Bill Triglia and bassist Red Mitchell im Robert Reisner's jazz club Open Door. He recorded seldom, notably with guitarist Chuck Wayne and with Gerry Mulligan's big band. In 1954 he recorded with drummer Art Mardigan (The Jazz School), 1955 with Tony Fruscella. In 1961 he recorded under the direction of Dave Schildkraut, with vocalist Jackie Paris at one take (Jackie's Blues).

In poor health, he retired to Staten Island and private teaching. Joseph made a small splash with the Uptown Records album One of a Kind (1984), which was widely and favorably reviewed. Al Cohn, Bill Triglia, Joey Baron, and Red Mitchell were the sidemen. Joseph played in his career also with Bill Crow and Turk Van Lake. In the 70s and 80s he lived in Staten Island, where he played in local venues and taught. He also included a long stint as assistant band director and full-time music appreciation teacher at Farrell Catholic High School. He had a keen interest in literature, especially William Shakespeare; and he recited long passages from memory in a deep Orson Wellesian voice with the conviction of a seasoned Shakespearian actor.

== Recognitions ==
Author Jack Kerouac honored the musician in his short story New York Scenes (from the collection Lonesome Traveler, 1960):

"LET'S GO SEE if we can find Don Joseph!"
"Who's Don Joseph?"
"Don Joseph is a terrific cornet player, who wanders around the village with his little mustache and his arms hanging at the sides with the cornet since Bix and more. – He stands at the juke box in the bar and plays with the music for a beer. – He looks like a handsome movie actor.– He's the great super glamorous secret Bobby Hackett of the jazz world."

The jazz critic Scott Yanow adds the musician to his list of Trumpet Kings (Backbeat Books, 2001).

== Discography ==
- Gene Roland Band Featuring Charlie Parker: The Band That Never Was (Spotlite, 1950)
- Gerry Mulligan: Mullenium (Columbia/Legacy 1957)
- Chuck Wayne: String Fever (RCA/Fresh Sound, 1957)
