= Duo (Hank Jones and Red Mitchell album) =

Studio album by Hank Jones and Red Mitchell
- Released: 1988
- Recorded: December 1987
- Studio: Van Gelder Studio, Englewood Cliffs, NJ
- Genre: Jazz
- Length: 50:01
- Label: Timeless; SJP 283

Hank Jones chronology
Hot Flutes (1985)	Duo (1988)	Standard Collection Vol. 1: Summertime (1988)

Red Mitchell chronology
The Red Barron Duo (1985)	Duo (1987)	Jive at Five (1988)

Duo (also referred to as Hank Jones-Red Mitchel Duo) is an album by pianist Hank Jones and bassist Red Mitchell recorded in 1987 for the Dutch Timeless label.

== Reception ==
Professional ratings
Review scores
Source	Rating
AllMusic	4/5 stars
The Penguin Guide to Jazz	3.5/4 stars

AllMusic awarded the album 4 stars and its review by Ken Dryden states: "These two musicians usually make any date that they're a part of a success and this rare duo date together is no exception. Jones' effortlessly swinging style is matched beautifully by the bassist's imaginative lines". The Penguin Guide to Jazz summarized the album as "gorgeous", and wrote that "Jones works around and under the bassist's lines like the great accompanist he is".

== Track listing ==
1. "Gone With the Wind" (Herb Magidson, Allie Wrubel) – 6:17
2. "What Am I Here For?" (Duke Ellington, Frankie Laine) – 6:55
3. "A Child Is Born" (Thad Jones) – 6:09
4. "Wee" (Denzil Best) – 5:29
5. "Someone I love (a.k.a. Jam for your bread)" (Red Mitchell) – 4:16
6. "Mean to Me" (Fred E. Ahlert, Roy Turk) – 4:27
7. "I'll Remember April" (Gene de Paul, Patricia Johnston, Don Raye) – 8:17
8. "But Beautiful" (Van Heusen, Burke) – 8:11

== Personnel ==
- Hank Jones – piano
- Red Mitchell – bass
