= Uptown Records (jazz) =

American jazz record label

Uptown Records is a jazz record label based in Champlain, New York. It was founded by Robert E. Sunenblick MD. (Bob Sunenblick) in 1981. Former seat has been in Harrington Park, New Jersey.

== Discography ==
Catalog	Artist	Album
	Moore, Ralph	[NEVER ISSUED] see Reservoir Records
27.01	Joe Thomas	Raw Meat
27.02	J.R. Monterose	Live in Albany
27.03	John W. Bubbles	Back on Broadway
27.04	Beryl Booker	[NEVER ISSUED]
27.05	Paul Quinichette	[NEVER ISSUED]
27.06	J.R. Monterose & Tommy Flanagan	...And a Little Pleasure
27.07	Dickie Wells	Lonesome Road
27.08	Hod O'Brien	Bits and Pieces
27.09	Allen Eager	Renaissance
27.10	Dave Schildkraut	[NEVER ISSUED]
27.11	Philly Joe Jones Dameronia	To Tadd with Love
27.12	Joe Thomas & Jay McShann	Blowin' in from K.C.
27.13	Haywood Henry	The Gentle Monster
27.14	Frank Wess & Johnny Coles	Two at the Top
27.15	Philly Joe Jones Dameronia	Look Stop Listen
27.16	Pepper Adams	Live at Fat Tuesday's
27.17	Don Sickler	The Music of Kenny Dorham
27.18	Charlie Rouse & Red Rodney	Social Call
27.19	Budd Johnson	Ole Dude and the Fundance Kid
27.20	Barry Harris	For the Moment
27.21	Buddy Tate & Al Grey	Just Jazz
27.22	Joe Puma	[NEVER ISSUED] see Reservoir Records
27.23	Don Joseph	One of a Kind
27.24	Peter Leitch	Exhilaration
27.25	Maria Muldaur	Transbluency
27.26	Kenny Barron	Autumn in New York
27.27	Claudio Roditi	Claudio!
27.28	Carl Fontana	The Great Fontana
27.29	Tommy Flanagan	Nights at the Vanguard
27.30	Freddie Redd	Lonely City
27.31	Pepper Adams	The Adams Effect
27.32	Jimmy Gourley	The Left Bank of New York
27.33	Various Artists	An Uptown Christmas
27.34	Charlie Rouse & Sahib Shihab	Soul Mates
27.35	Chet Baker	Boston, 1954
27.36	Charlie Parker	Montreal, 1953
27.37	Densil Pinnock	I Waited for You
27.38	Serge Chaloff	Boston, 1950
27.39	Don Sickler	Night Watch
27.40	Sonny Clark	Oakland, 1955
27.41	Kenny Barron	New York Attitude
27.42	Charlie Parker	Boston, 1952
27.43	Jack Sheldon	Playing for Change
27.44	Dodo Marmarosa	Pittsburgh, 1958
27.45	Coleman Hawkins	Jamestown, NY, 1958
27.46	Lee Wiley	Music of Manhattan
27.47	Barry Harris	For the Moment
27.48	Charles Mingus	Charles 'Baron' Mingus
27.49	Allen Eager	In the Land of Oo-Bla-Dee
27.50	Charlie Rouse & Red Rodney	Social Call
27.51	Charlie Parker & Dizzy Gillespie	Town Hall, New York City, June 22, 1945
27.84	Jeri Southern	Blue Note, Chicago, March 1956
