= Takin' Care of Business (Charlie Rouse album) =

Studio album by Charlie Rouse
- Released: 1960
- Recorded: May 11, 1960; Plaza Sound Studios, New York City
- Genre: Jazz
- Label: Jazzland; JLP 19
- Producer: Orrin Keepnews

Charlie Rouse chronology
The Chase Is On (1957)	Takin' Care of Business (1960)	Yeah! (1961)

Takin' Care of Business is an album led by American jazz saxophonist Charlie Rouse which was recorded in 1960 for the Jazzland label.

== Reception ==
Professional ratings
Review scores
Source	Rating
AllMusic	4/5 stars
MusicHound Jazz	4/5 stars
The Penguin Guide to Jazz Recordings	3.5/4 stars
The Rolling Stone Jazz & Blues Album Guide	4/5 stars

Scott Yanow of AllMusic called the album "a fine modern mainstream jam session-flavored set".

== Track listing ==
1. "Blue Farouq" (Blue Mitchell) - 7:24
2. "204" (Randy Weston) - 7:24
3. "Upptankt" (Charlie Rouse) - 4:42
4. "Weirdо" (Kenny Drew) - 5:59
5. "Pretty Strange" (Weston) - 5:14
6. "They Didn't Believe Me" (Jerome Kern, Herbert Reynolds) - 6:52

== Personnel ==
- Charlie Rouse - tenor saxophone
- Blue Mitchell - trumpet (tracks 1–4 & 6)
- Walter Bishop, Jr. - piano
- Earl May - bass
- Art Taylor - drums
