= Scratch (Kenny Barron album) =

Studio album by Kenny Barron
- Released: 1985
- Recorded: March 11, 1985
- Studio: ERAS Studio, NYC
- Genre: Jazz
- Length: 37:03
- Label: Enja; 4092
- Producer: Horst Weber and Matthias Winckelmann

Kenny Barron chronology
Autumn in New York (1984)	Scratch (1985)	Sphere on Tour (1985)

Scratch is an album by pianist Kenny Barron which was recorded in 1985 and released on the German Enja label.

== Reception ==
Professional ratings
Review scores
Source	Rating
Allmusic	4/5 stars
Tom Hull	B+

In his review on Allmusic, Scott Yanow noted "Kenny Barron, one of those talented pianists who always seems to be underrated, breaks away from playing standards and conventional bebop on this frequently exciting trio date ... The fresh material and close interplay between the musicians make this set one of Barron's best trio recordings to date".

== Track listing ==
All compositions by Kenny Barron except where noted.

1. "Scratch" – 5:20
2. "Quiet Times" (Carmen Lundy) – 5:32
3. "Water Lillie" – 10:19
4. "Song for Abdullah" – 5:33
5. "The Third Eye" – 6:28
6. "Jacob's Ladder" (Dave Holland) – 3:37
7. "And Then Again" – 5:20

== Personnel ==
- Kenny Barron – piano
- Dave Holland – bass (tracks 1–3 & 5–7)
- Daniel Humair – drums (tracks 1–3 & 5–7)
