= Flight Path (album) =

Studio album by Sphere
- Released: 1983
- Recorded: 1983
- Studio: Van Gelder Studio, Englewood Cliffs, NJ
- Genre: Jazz
- Length: 36:53
- Label: Elektra/Musician; 60313
- Producer: Damu Productions Ltd.

Sphere chronology
Four in One (1982)	Flight Path (1983)	Sphere on Tour (1985)

Kenny Barron chronology
Spiral (1982)	Flight Path (1982)	Green Chimneys (1983)

Flight Path is the second album by the group the Sphere featuring saxophonist Charlie Rouse, pianist Kenny Barron, bassist Buster Williams, and drummer Ben Riley that was recorded in 1983 and released on the Elektra/Musician label.

== Reception ==
Professional ratings
Review scores
Source	Rating
AllMusic	3/5 stars

In his review on AllMusic, Ken Dryden states: "All of the group's members are in top form, with drummer Ben Riley (like Rouse, a veteran of Monk's quartet) solidly anchoring the rhythm section".

== Track listing ==
1. "If I Should Lose You" (Ralph Rainger, Leo Robin) – 10:31
2. "Pumpkin's Delight" (Charlie Rouse) – 6:40
3. "Played Twice" (Thelonious Monk) – 4:30
4. "El Sueño" (Kenny Barron) – 5:27
5. "Christina" (Buster Williams) – 4:47
6. "Flight Path" (Barron) – 4:45

== Personnel ==
- Charlie Rouse – tenor saxophone
- Kenny Barron – piano
- Buster Williams – bass
- Ben Riley – drum
