= Playing for Change (album) =

Studio album by Jack Sheldon
- Released: 1997
- Recorded: May 24 & 25, 1986
- Studio: Van Gelder Studio, Englewood Cliffs, NJ
- Genre: Jazz
- Length: 63:09
- Label: Uptown; UP 27.43
- Producer: David A. Sunenblick, Robert E. Sunenblick MD.

Jack Sheldon chronology
Blues in the Night (1984)	Playing for Change (1997)	Hollywood Heroes (1987)

Playing for Change, is an album by trumpeter Jack Sheldon which was recorded in 1986 and released by the Uptown label in 1997.

== Reception ==
Professional ratings
Review scores
Source	Rating
AllMusic	3/5 stars
The Penguin Guide to Jazz Recordings	3/4 stars

On AllMusic Ken Dryden states, "Jack Sheldon is probably better known for his trumpet playing on other musicians' record dates, but this 1986 studio date more than proves he is a capable leader ... Recommended". In JazzTimes, Chuck Berg wrote" Jack Sheldon-TV actor, antic vocalist and cut-up extraordinaire-also happens to be one hell of a trumpeter. Here, in a superb session from 1986, we get a telling reminder of just how compelling the Sheldon jazz persona is ... Whatever the tempo, and there are some scorchers, it's Sheldon's gorgeous tone and plucky melodism that impresses first, last and always. ... Throughout, the band cooks at a simmer apropos to the session's dialogic intimacy. It's serious fun at the mainstream summit".

== Track listing ==
1. "Angel Eyes" (Matt Dennis, Earl Brent) – 4:39
2. "Along Came Betty" (Benny Golson) – 5:52
3. "Ne Quittez Pas" (Bobby Porcelli) – 5:12
4. "You Better Go Now" (Irvin Graham, Bickley Reichner) – 3:44
5. "The Chase" (Tadd Dameron) – 4:54
6. "Dear Ann" (Paul Chambers) – 5:19
7. "Wait and See" (Jack Sheldon) – 3:17
8. "That Old Feeling" (Sammy Fain, Lew Brown) – 5:39
9. "Follow Me" (Cecil Payne) – 4:03
10. "Just for a Thrill" (Lil Hardin Armstrong, Don Raye) – 4:58
11. "Trane's Strain" (Curtis Fuller) – 4:43
12. "No Trump" (Jerry Dodgion) – 4:58
13. "Nancy" (Jimmy Van Heusen, Phil Silvers) – 5:51

== Personnel ==
- Jack Sheldon – trumpet, arranger
- Jerry Dodgion – alto saxophone
- Barry Harris – piano
- Rufus Reid – double bass
- Ben Riley – drums
- Don Sickler – flugelhorn (track 2), arranger (tracks 1–6 & 9–13)
