= Grown Folks Music =

Studio album by The Ben Riley Quartet Featuring Wayne Escoffery
- Released: 2012
- Recorded: August 30, 2010
- Studio: Tedesco Studios, Paramus, New Jersey
- Genre: Jazz
- Length: 55:30
- Label: Sunnyside; SSC 1305
- Producer: Ben Riley, Wayne Escoffery

Ben Riley chronology
Memories of T (2006)	Grown Folks Music (2012)

Grown Folks Music is an album by the Ben Riley Quartet, led by drummer Ben Riley. His third and final release as a leader, it was recorded on August 30, 2010, at Tedesco Studios in Paramus, New Jersey, and was issued on CD in 2012 by Sunnyside Records. On the album, Riley is joined by saxophonist Wayne Escoffery, guitarists Freddie Bryant and Avi Rothbard, and double bassist Ray Drummond.

== Reception ==
Professional ratings
Review scores
Source	Rating
All About Jazz	4/5 stars
Jazzwise	3/5 stars
Tom Hull – on the Web	A−

In a review for Jazzwise, Selwyn Harris wrote: "A veteran master of hard bop drumming shows that a lazy or snappy groove is all you need to make jazz standards sound delicious."

Raul d'Gama Rose of All About Jazz called Riley "one of the great musicians among the drummers of today," possessing "one of the keenest senses of shade and hue," and with the ability to "play phrases on his skins just as well as a pianist, bassist or any other musician." Rose also praised Escoffery's playing, noting that his ideas are "executed with great depth and passionate character," and stating: "He often begins phrases inside out or from the end, going backwards, and this makes for a sense of surprise that is always delightful, and makes the combination of saxophonist and drummer quite memorable."

Critic Tom Hull awarded the album a grade of A−, and included it in his list of the top ten jazz releases of 2012.

== Track listing ==
1. "Friday the 13th" (Thelonious Monk) – 9:04
2. "Laura" (David Raksin) – 7:15
3. "Teo" (Thelonious Monk) – 6:09
4. "Without a Song" (Vincent Youmans) – 8:28
5. "Weaver of Dreams" (Victor Young) – 8:47
6. "Lulu's Back in Town" (Harry Warren) – 8:24
7. "If Ever I Would Leave You" (Alan Jay Lerner) – 7:23

== Personnel ==
- Ben Riley – drums
- Wayne Escoffery – tenor saxophone
- Avi Rothbard – guitar (tracks 1, 4, 5, and 7)
- Freddie Bryant – guitar (tracks 2, 3, and 6)
- Ray Drummond – double bass
