= Ben Riley =

American drummer (1933–2017)

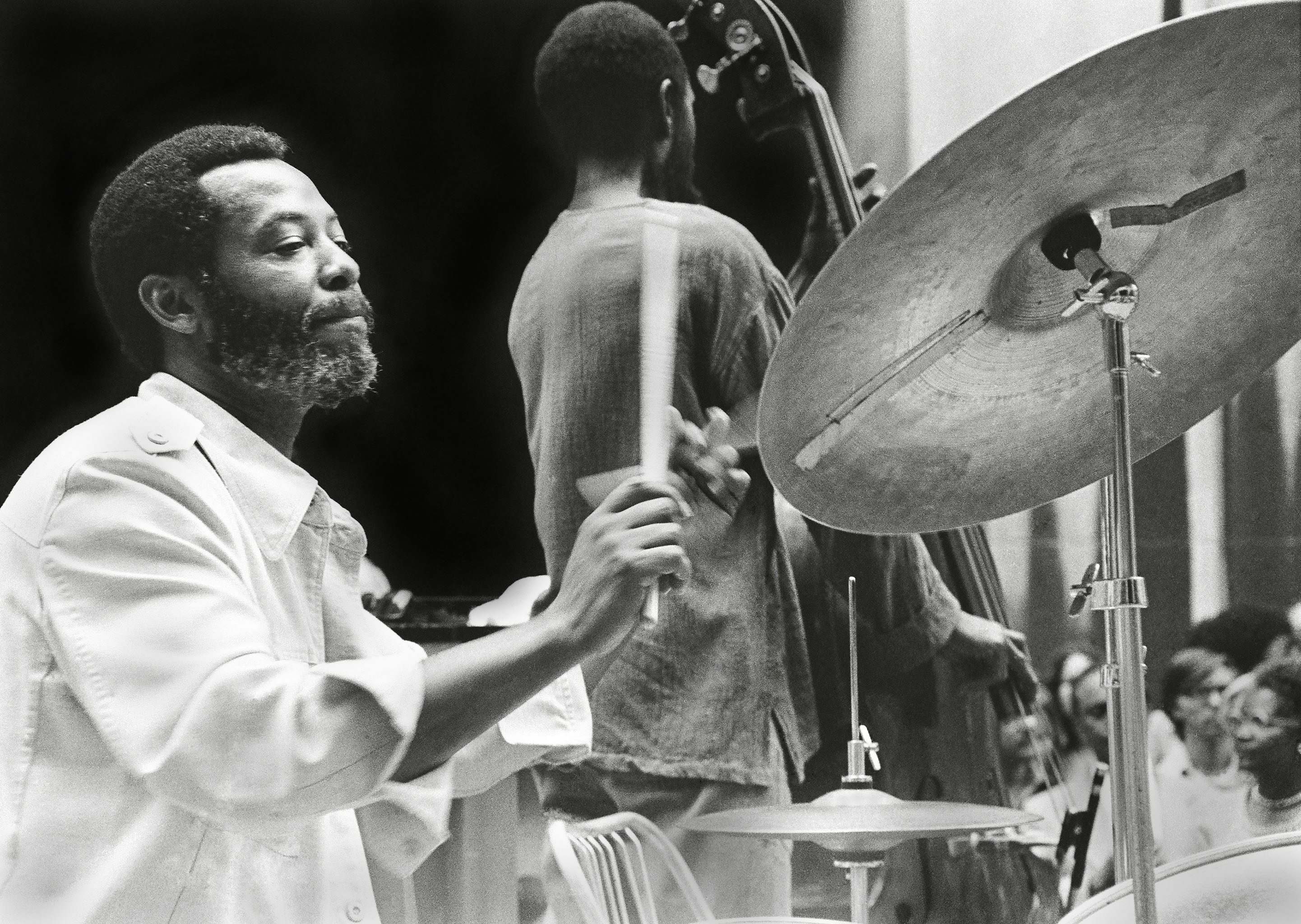
- Riley in New York City, 1977

Background information
- Born: Benjamin Alexander Riley Jr. July 17, 1933; Savannah, Georgia, U.S.
- Died: November 18, 2017 (aged 84) West Islip, New York
- Genres: Jazz
- Occupation: Musician
- Instrument: Drums

Benjamin Alexander Riley Jr. (July 17, 1933 – November 18, 2017) was an American jazz drummer known primarily for his work with Sonny Rollins and Thelonious Monk. Riley worked with a number of other musicians throughout his prolific career as a sideman, such as Alice Coltrane, Stan Getz, Eddie "Lockjaw" Davis, and Ahmad Jamal. Riley was also a member of the group Sphere, and during the 1970s and 1980s, he was a member of the New York Jazz Quartet.

== Biography ==
Benjamin Alexander Riley Jr. was born in Savannah, Georgia, on July 17, 1933, and at the age of four moved with his family to New York City.

Riley performed with Sonny Rollins, Randy Weston, Sonny Stitt, Stan Getz, Junior Mance, Kenny Burrell, Eddie "Lockjaw" Davis–Johnny Griffin (1960–1962), Ahmad Jamal, Billy Taylor, and Ray Bryant. He then spent 1964 to 1967 in Thelonious Monk's quartet. After Monk, he played with Alice Coltrane (intermittently between 1968 and 1975), Ron Carter (1975–1977), and Jim Hall (1981), as well as with the New York Jazz Quartet (1970s and 1980s) and the band Sphere. He also played frequently with pianist Abdullah Ibrahim.

Riley died of lung disease and complications of diabetes in West Islip, New York on November 18, 2017 at the age of 84.

== Discography ==
=== As leader ===
- Weaver of Dreams (Joken, 1996) – recorded in 1993
- Memories of T (Concord, 2006)
- Grown Folks Music (Sunnyside, 2012)

=== As sideman ===
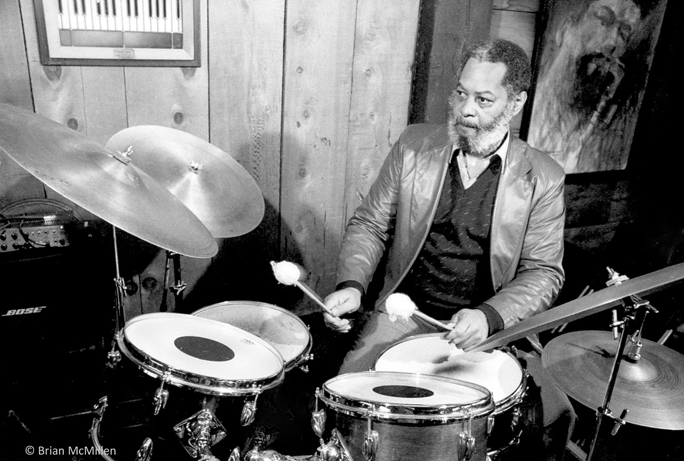
Ben Riley at Bach Dancing & Dynamite Society, Half Moon Bay CA March 20, 1988. Trio with Kenny Barron, piano; Rufus Reid, bass

With Noah Baerman

- Patch Kit (CD Baby, 2006) with Ron Carter

With Chet Baker

- As Time Goes By (Timeless, 1986)
- Cool Cat (Timeless, 1986 [1989])

With Bill Barron

- Variations in Blue (Muse, 1983)
- Live at Cobi's 2 (SteepleChase, 1885 [2006])
- The Next Plateau (Muse, 1987 [1989])
- Live at Cobi's (SteepleChase, 1988-89 [2005])

With Kenny Barron

- Innocence (Wolf, 1978)
- Golden Lotus (Muse, 1980 [1982])
- Imo Live (Whynot, 1982)
- Green Chimneys (Criss Cross Jazz, 1983)
- The Only One (Reservoir, 1990)
- Lemuria-Seascape (Candid, 1991)
- Live at Bradley's (EmArcy, 1996 [2001])
- Live at Bradley's II (Sunnyside, 1996 [2002])
- Minor Blues (Venus, 2009)

With Gary Bartz

- Episode One: Children of Harlem (Challenge, 1994)

With Ted Brown

- In Good Company (Criss Cross, 1985) with Jimmy Raney

With Ray Bryant

- Live at Basin Street East (Sue, 1964)
- Cold Turkey (Sue, 1964)

With Kenny Burrell

- Listen to the Dawn (Muse, 1980 [1983])
- Groovin' High (Muse, 1981 [1984])

With Ron Carter

- Yellow & Green (CTI, 1976)
- Piccolo (Milestone, 1977)
- Peg Leg (Milestone, 1978)
- Pick 'Em (Milestone, 1978 [1980])

With Alice Coltrane

- A Monastic Trio (1968)
- Ptah, the El Daoud (1970)
- World Galaxy (1972)
- Lord of Lords (1972)
- Live at the Berkeley Community Theater 1972 (BCT, 1972 [2019])

With Eddie "Lockjaw" Davis

- Afro-Jaws (Riverside, 1960)

With Ricky Ford

- Manhattan Blues (Candid, 1989)
- Ebony Rhapsody (Candid, 1990)
- American-African Blues (Candid, 1991)

With Red Garland

- Stepping Out (Galaxy, 1978)
- So Long Blues (Galaxy, 1979 [1981])
- Strike Up the Band (Galaxy, 1979 [1981])

With Benny Golson

- Time Speaks (Baystate, 1983) with Freddie Hubbard and Woody Shaw

With Bennie Green

- Glidin' Along (1961)

With Johnny Griffin

- Battle Stations (Prestige, 1960) – with Eddie "Lockjaw" Davis
- Johnny Griffin’s Studio Jazz Party (Riverside, 1960)
- Tough Tenors (Jazzland, 1960) – with Eddie "Lockjaw" Davis
- Griff & Lock (Jazzland, 1960) – with Eddie "Lockjaw" Davis
- The First Set (Prestige, 1961) – with Eddie "Lockjaw" Davis
- The Tenor Scene (Prestige, 1961) – with Eddie "Lockjaw" Davis
- The Late Show (Prestige, 1961) – with Eddie "Lockjaw" Davis
- The Midnight Show (Prestige, 1961) – with Eddie "Lockjaw" Davis
- Lookin' at Monk! (Jazzland, 1961) – with Eddie "Lockjaw" Davis
- Change of Pace (Riverside, 1961)
- Blues Up & Down (Jazzland, 1961) – with Eddie "Lockjaw" Davis
- White Gardenia (Riverside, 1961)
- The Kerry Dancers (Riverside, 1961–62)
- Tough Tenor Favorites (Jazzland, 1962) – with Eddie "Lockjaw" Davis

With Michael Franks

- Tiger in the Rain (Warner Bros., 1979)

With Andrew Hill

- Lift Every Voice (Blue Note, 1969)
- Shades (Soul Note, 1986)

With Andrew Hill Eternal Spirit 1989 Blue Note Records

With Hank Jones

- Bop Redux (Muse, 1977)
- The Great Jazz Trio, What's New (Baybridge, 1998)

With Sam Jones

- Down Home (Riverside, 1962)

With Junior Mance

- Junior Mance Trio at the Village Vanguard (Jazzland, 1961)

With Ken McIntyre

- Year of the Iron Sheep (United Artists, 1962)

With Jay McShann

- Some Blues (Chiaroscuro, 1993)

With Thelonious Monk

- It's Monk's Time (1964)
- Monk (1964)
- Live at the It Club (1964)
- Straight, No Chaser (1967)
- Underground (1968)

With Mark Murphy

- One for Junior (1991)

With Freddie Redd

- Lonely City (Uptown, 1985 [1989])

With Sonny Rollins

- The Bridge (RCA Victor, 1962)
- What's New? (RCA Victor, 1962)

With Dan Rose

- Fountains (Midlantic Records, 2002)

With Charlie Rouse

- Moment's Notice (Storyville/Jazzcraft, 1978)

With Jack Sheldon

- Playing for Change (Uptown, 1986 [1997])

With Sphere

- Four in One (Elektra/Musician, 1982)
- Flight Path (Elektra/Musician, 1983)
- Sphere on Tour (Red, 1985)
- Pumpkin's Delight (Red, 1986 [1993])
- Four for All (Verve, 1987)
- Bird Songs (1988)
- Sphere (1998)

With Nina Simone

- Nina Simone at Town Hall (Colpix, 1959) – live

With Jeremy Steig

- Flute Fever (Columbia, 1964)

With Horace Tapscott

- Dissent or Descent (Nimbus West, 1984 [1998])

With Roseanna Vitro

- Listen Here (Texas Rose, 1984)

With Larry Willis

- A Tribute to Someone (AudioQuest, 1994)
