= Social Call (Charlie Rouse and Red Rodney album) =

Studio album by Charlie Rouse and Red Rodney
- Released: 1984
- Recorded: January 21 & 22, 1984
- Studio: Van Gelder Studio, Englewood Cliffs, New Jersey, United States
- Genre: Jazz
- Length: 59:04
- Label: Uptown; UP 27.18
- Producer: Mark Feldman, Robert E. Sunenblick MD.

Red Rodney chronology
Sprint (1983)	Social Call (1984)	No Turn on Red (1986)

Charlie Rouse chronology
The Upper Manhattan Jazz Society (1981)	Social Call (1984)	Soul Mates (1988)

Social Call is an album by saxophonist Charlie Rouse and trumpeter Red Rodney which was recorded and released on the Uptown label in 1984.

== Reception ==
Professional ratings
Review scores
Source	Rating
AllMusic	4.5/5 stars
The Penguin Guide to Jazz Recordings	3/4 stars

The AllMusic review by Scott Yanow stated "Old friends Rouse and Rodney work off each other very well, and the results are swinging and enjoyable".

The authors of The Penguin Guide to Jazz Recordings called the album "a fine showing from the saxophonist," and praised Dailey's contribution, stating that he is "hugely authoritative... and plays with relaxed power."

David Franklin of Jazz Times noted that Rouse's "appealing, distinctive tone, his clipped, inventive phrasing and his forceful swing-all characteristics" are "clearly in evidence" on the album, and called Rodney "a fine intuitive player" who "never fails to swing infectiously while crafting steadfastly melodic lines."

== Track listing ==
1. "Little Chico" (Charlie Rouse) – 6:20
2. "Social Call" (Gigi Gryce) – 5:46
3. "Half Nelson" (Miles Davis) – 6:29
4. "Greenhouse" (Bobby Porcelli) – 4:44
5. "Darn That Dream" (Jimmy Van Heusen, Eddie DeLange) – 9:31
6. "Casbah" (Tadd Dameron) – 6:11

== Personnel ==
- Charlie Rouse – tenor saxophone
- Red Rodney – trumpet, flugelhorn
- Albert Dailey – piano
- Cecil McBee – bass
- Kenny Washington – drums
- Don Sickler – arranger
