= Memories of T =

Studio album by Ben Riley's Monk Legacy Septet
- Released: 2006
- Recorded: August 7, 2003; April 24 and 25, 2005
- Studio: Van Gelder Studio, Englewood Cliffs, New Jersey
- Genre: Jazz
- Length: 1:04:06
- Label: Concord Jazz; CCD-30095-2
- Producer: Don Sickler

Ben Riley chronology
Weaver of Dreams (1996)	Memories of T (2006)	Grown Folks Music (2012)

Memories of T is an album by Ben Riley's Monk Legacy Septet, led by drummer Ben Riley. His second release as a leader, it was recorded during 2003 and 2005 at Van Gelder Studio in Englewood Cliffs, New Jersey, and was issued on CD in 2006 by Concord Jazz. On the album, Riley is joined by saxophonists Bruce Williams, Jimmy Greene, Wayne Escoffery, and Jay Brandford, trumpeter Don Sickler (who also provided the arrangements), guitarist Freddie Bryant, and double bassists Kiyoshi Kitagawa and Peter Washington. The title of the album refers to Thelonious Monk, with whom Riley played and recorded, and the recording features eleven Monk compositions.

== Reception ==
Professional ratings
Review scores
Source	Rating
All About Jazz	4/5 stars
PopMatters	7/10 stars

Nate Chinen of The New York Times described the album as "warm and thoughtful," and wrote: "On more than a few tunes a four-part horn section spells out the jangly or cascading lines that Monk regularly played, and the effect is refreshing: what had become a mannered pianism manages to sound smart, as voiced for a trumpet and three saxophones... The musicians... are nicely suited to the material... There are standout moments... but the album's best feature is its smart collectivity. That and Mr. Riley's drumming, ebullient as ever."

A writer for AllMusic stated: "Adapting Thelonious Monk's idiosyncratic works for a septet without piano is no mean feat, but Ben Riley... does a remarkable job on this collection... The group's arrangements add a surprising heft to numbers like 'Rhythm-A-Ning' and 'Epistrophy,' while preserving the innate delicacy of pieces like 'Pannonica.'"

In a review for PopMatters, Robert R. Calder commented: "The idea of Monk performances by a piano-less ensemble... would only be remarkable... if the music had been closely Monkian in ways this set for the most part simply isn't. The finest of tuning would be required to correct the music into the intensely Monkian, and this set has to be identified as by a band of different, still individual character. Its values are far from unworthy, but they're other than Monk's."

Dan Ouellette of Billboard remarked: "While Monk's repertoire has been covered exhaustively since his passing, these versions shed a new celebratory light on the maestro's unique harmonic universe without straightening the twists and turns of the original performances."

Writing for All About Jazz, J. Hunter noted: "The genius of Monk lay in his ability to go far out on the limb without falling off. Riley and Sickler's twist on Monk takes Memories of T just as far out. Instead of falling, though, the music is buoyed by a divine pandemonium that takes the disc beyond mere repertory. Nobody can ever really speak for Monk, but I have to think he would have approved."

The editors of The Village Voice included the album in their list of the best jazz releases of 2006.

The Santa Barbara Independent's Josef Woodard featured the album in his 2006 "Baker's Dozen," writing: "Monk's old drummer revisits his boss/colleague's towering songbook, in an intriguing piano-less septet format, with ear-massaging results."

== Track listing ==
Composed by Thelonious Monk.

1. "Let's Call This" – 5:29
2. "Rhythm-A-Ning" – 7:42
3. "Gallop's Gallop" – 6:17
4. "Nutty" – 5:50
5. "Brake's Sake" – 6:18
6. "Pannonica" – 6:30
7. "Straight, No Chaser" – 6:21
8. "Bemsha Swing" – 6:28
9. "Shuffle Boil" – 5:59
10. "Green Chimneys" – 5:40
11. "Epistrophy" – 1:06

== Personnel ==
- Ben Riley – drums
- Bruce Williams – soprano saxophone, alto saxophone
- Wayne Escoffery – tenor saxophone (tracks 1, 2, 4, 6, 7, 9, 11)
- Jimmy Greene – tenor saxophone (tracks 3, 5, 8, 10)
- Jay Brandford – baritone saxophone
- Don Sickler – trumpet
- Freddie Bryant – guitar
- Kiyoshi Kitagawa – double bass (tracks 1, 2, 4, 6, 7, 9, 11)
- Peter Washington – double bass (tracks 3, 5, 8, 10)
