= Yeah! (Charlie Rouse album) =

Studio album by Charlie Rouse
- Released: 1961
- Recorded: December 20 & 21, 1960; New York City
- Genre: Jazz
- Length: 37:52
- Label: Epic; BA 17012

Charlie Rouse chronology
Takin' Care of Business (1960)	Yeah! (1961)	Bossa Nova Bacchanal (1962)

Yeah! is an album by American saxophonist Charlie Rouse recorded in 1960 and released on the Epic label. It was reissued in 1990 with the title Unsung Hero, with extra tracks recorded during July 1961.

== Reception ==
Professional ratings
Review scores
Source	Rating
AllMusic	3.5/5 stars
MusicHound Jazz	3.5/5 stars
The Penguin Guide to Jazz	3.5/4 stars
The Rolling Stone Jazz & Blues Album Guide	4/5 stars

Steve Leggett, in his review for AllMusic, stated: "Rouse headed up few sessions on his own as a bandleader, but as this calm, workmanlike set... clearly shows, he could rise to the occasion".

Jack Fuller of the Chicago Tribune commented: "In performance, Rouse`s musical taste was impeccable and his musical sophistication the match of Monk's."

== Track listing ==
All compositions by Charlie Rouse except as indicated

1. "You Don't Know What Love Is" (Don Raye, Gene de Paul) - 6:31
2. "Lil Rousin'" - 5:05
3. "Stella by Starlight" (Victor Young, Ned Washington) - 6:21
4. "Billy's Blues" - 8:46
5. "Rouse's Point" - 4:47
6. "(There Is) No Greater Love" (Isham Jones, Marty Symes) - 6:22

== Personnel ==
- Charlie Rouse - tenor saxophone
- Billy Gardner - piano
- Peck Morrison - bass
- Dave Bailey - drums
