= In Good Company (Ted Brown album) =

Studio album by Ted Brown with Jimmy Raney
- Released: 1985
- Recorded: December 23, 1985
- Studio: Van Gelder Studio, Englewood Cliffs, NJ
- Genre: Jazz
- Length: 69:39
- Label: Criss Cross Jazz; Criss 1019
- Producer: Gerry Teekens

Jimmy Raney chronology
Nardis (1985)	In Good Company (1985)	Wisteria (1985)

Ted Brown chronology
Free Wheeling (1956)	In Good Company (1985)	Free Spirit (1989)

In Good Company is an album by saxophonist Ted Brown with guitarist Jimmy Raney recorded in 1985 and released on the Dutch label, Criss Cross Jazz. The CD rerelease added five alternate takes in 1990 renaming the album Good Company and displaying Jimmy Raney's name more prominently.

== Reception ==
Professional ratings
Review scores
Source	Rating
AllMusic	4/5 stars
The Penguin Guide to Jazz Recordings	3.5/4 stars

David R. Adler of AllMusic observed "In Good Company makes a nice companion piece to Warne Marsh's Back Home ... There's some good Tristano-oriented bop writing here." noting "Ted Brown and guitar legend Jimmy Raney are essentially co-leaders here, teaming with a stellar rhythm section".

== Track listing ==
1. "Blimey" (Ted Brown) – 4:49
2. "We'll Be Together Again" (Carl T. Fischer, Frankie Laine) – 5:56
3. "Lost and Found" (Hod O'Brien) – 6:40
4. "Sir Felix" (Jimmy Raney) – 4:37
5. "Instant Blue" (O'Brien) – 7:01
6. "Gee, Baby, Ain't I Good to You" (Andy Razaf, Don Redman) – 4:49
7. "People Will Say We're in Love" (Richard Rodgers, Oscar Hammerstein II) – 6:13
8. "Lost and Found" [alternate take] (O'Brien) – 6:24 Bonus track on CD reissue
9. "We'll Be Together Again" [alternate take] (Fischer, Laine) – 6:29 Bonus track on CD reissue
10. "Blimey" [alternate take] (Brown) – 5:09 Bonus track on CD reissue
11. "Sir Felix" [alternate take] (Raney) – 4:35 Bonus track on CD reissue
12. "People Will Say We're in Love" [alternate take] (Rogers, Hammerstein) – 6:48 Bonus track on CD reissue

== Personnel ==
- Ted Brown – tenor saxophone
- Jimmy Raney – guitar
- Hod O'Brien – piano
- Buster Williams – bass
- Ben Riley – drums
