= Pick 'Em =

Studio album by Ron Carter
- Released: 1980
- Recorded: December 1978
- Studio: Van Gelder Studio, Englewood Cliffs, NJ
- Genre: Jazz
- Length: 36:16
- Label: Milestone; M-9092
- Producer: Ron Carter for Retrac Productions

Ron Carter chronology
Carnaval (1978)	Pick 'Em (1980)	Parade (1979)

Pick 'Em is an album by bassist Ron Carter which was recorded at Van Gelder Studio in 1978 and released on the Milestone label in 1980.

== Reception ==
Professional ratings
Review scores
Source	Rating
AllMusic	4/5 stars

The AllMusic review by Alex Henderson called it "an enjoyable disc that will appeal to those who have a taste for lavish orchestral jazz".

== Track listing ==
All compositions by Ron Carter except where noted

1. "All Blues" (Miles Davis) – 8:42
2. "Opus 2" – 5:32
3. "B and A" – 3:54
4. "Pick 'Em" – 6:01
5. "Tranquil" – 5:22
6. "Eight" – 6:45

== Personnel ==
- Ron Carter – piccolo bass, bass, arranger
- Kenny Barron - piano
- Buster Williams – bass
- Ben Riley - drums
- John Abramowitz, Richard Locker, Charles McCracken, Kermit Moore – cello
- Hugh McCracken – guitar, harmonica (track 4)
- Ralph MacDonald – percussion (tracks 4 & 5)
