= Griot Libertè =

Studio album by Buster Williams
- Released: June 29, 2004
- Recorded: February 5, 2004
- Studios: Van Gelder Studio, Englewood Cliffs, NJ
- Genre: Jazz
- Length: 55:27
- Labels: HighNote; HCD 7123
- Producer: Buster Williams

Buster Williams chronology
Houdini (2000)	Griot Libertè (2004)	65 Roses (2008)

Griot Libertè is an album by bassist Buster Williams recorded in 2004 and released on the HighNote label.

== Reception ==
Professional ratings
Review scores
Source	Rating
AllMusic	4/5 stars
All About Jazz	4/5 stars
The Penguin Guide to Jazz Recordings	4/4 stars

The AllMusic review by Scott Yanow said "There are times when the group sounds a bit like the Modern Jazz Quartet, but other selections find the musicians showing more individuality. They are very much in tune with each other and, although not a touring group, sound as if they play together very regularly. Excellent modern mainstream jazz".

On All About Jazz, John Kelman observed "Griot Libertè may also swing on the light side like MJQ, but the musical choices are far more weighty ... Griot Libertè is a project whose ultimate success should not be surprising; Williams has, over the course of forty years, demonstrated a remarkable natural sense of construction and an unfailingly refined musical instinct that makes every project well worth investigating".

In JazzTimes, Ron Wynn stated "Buster Williams is highly regarded and respected for many things, most notably the beauty of his tone and sound, along with the consistent quality of his writing and recordings, and Griot Liberte (HighNote) is no exception. The CD features a quartet that succeeds because of Stefon Harris’ intricate, superbly executed vibes solos, George Colligan’s lush, explosive piano support and the pinpoint interaction between Williams and drummer Lenny White".

The Guardian's Dave Gelly wrote "Williams's warm, sinuous double bass has underpinned the work of so many top soloists in his 40-year career. But in the past few years he has emerged as a considerable soloist and composer. He has also established a working relationship with the vibraphone and marimba player Stefon Harris that seems to bring out the best in both of them. The woody plangency of their tones blend to magical effect".

== Track listing ==
All compositions by Buster Williams except where noted

1. "Nomads" – 8:42
2. "Related to One" – 5:47
3. "The Triumphant Dance of the Butterfly" – 7:51
4. "The Wind of an Immortal Soul" – 9:22
5. "Ev'ry Time We Say Goodbye" (Cole Porter) – 6:35
6. "Joined at the Hip" – 8:42
7. "Concierto de Aranjuez" (Joaquín Rodrigo) – 5:24
8. "After the Ninth Wave" – 3:04

== Personnel ==
- Buster Williams - bass
- Stefon Harris - vibraphone
- George Colligan – piano
- Lenny White – drums
