= Green Chimneys =

Studio album by Kenny Barron Trio
- Released: 1984
- Recorded: July 9, 1983 and December 31, 1987
- Studios: Studio 44, Monster, Netherlands and Van Gelder Studio, Englewood Cliffs, NJ
- Genre: Jazz
- Length: 67:51
- Labels: Criss Cross Jazz; Criss 1008
- Producer: Gery Teekens

Kenny Barron chronology
Flight Path (1983)	Green Chimneys (1984)	1+1+1 (1984)

Green Chimneys is an album by pianist Kenny Barron which was recorded in Holland in 1983 and first released on the Dutch Criss Cross Jazz label. The 1988 CD reissue included six bonus tracks.

== Reception ==
Professional ratings
Review scores
Source	Rating
AllMusic	4/5 stars
The Penguin Guide to Jazz Recordings	4/4 stars
Tom Hull	B+

In his review on AllMusic, Scott Yanow wrote: "In the 1980s, Kenny Barron was recognized as one of jazz's top pianists, a modern mainstream master who two decades later is still in prime form."

== Track listing ==
1. "Softly, as in a Morning Sunrise" (Sigmund Romberg, Oscar Hammerstein II) – 4:38
2. "Don't Explain" (Arthur Herzog Jr., Billie Holiday) – 5:46
3. "There Is No Greater Love" (Isham Jones, Marty Symes) – 11:42
4. "Skylark" (Hoagy Carmichael, Johnny Mercer) – 7:26 Bonus track on CD reissue
5. "Green Chimneys" (Thelonious Monk) – 6:48
6. "Straight, No Chaser" (Monk) – 6:10
7. "Time Was" (Miguel Prado, Bob Russell) – 8:50 Misattributed on LP and CD to Harry Akst
8. "When Lights Are Low" (Benny Carter, Spencer Williams) – 6:25 Bonus track on CD reissue
9. "Morning Blues" (Kenny Barron) – 4:50 Bonus track on CD reissue
10. "Time Was" [take 2] (Prado, Russell) – 5:16 Bonus track on CD reissue
- Recorded at Studio 44, Monster, Netherlands on July 9, 1983 (tracks 1–3, 5–7 & 10) and at Rudy Van Gelder Studio, Englewood Cliffs, NJ on December 31, 1987 (tracks 4, 8 & 9)

== Personnel ==
- Kenny Barron – piano
- Buster Williams – bass
- Ben Riley – drums
