= Four in One (Sphere album) =

Studio album by Sphere
- Released: 1982
- Recorded: February 17, 1982
- Studio: Van Gelder Studio, Englewood Cliffs, NJ
- Genre: Jazz
- Length: 32:25
- Label: Elektra/Musician; 60166
- Producer: Damu Productions Ltd.

Sphere chronology
Four in One (1982)	Flight Path (1983)

Kenny Barron chronology
Kenny Barron at the Piano (1981)	Four in One (1982)	Imo Live (1982)

Four in One (subtitled A Tribute to Thelonious Monk) is the debut album by the group Sphere featuring pianist Kenny Barron, bassist Buster Williams, and Monk's former drummer Ben Riley, and his former saxophonist Charlie Rouse. The album was released by the Elektra/Musician label. Four in One was coincidentally recorded on the day of Monk's death in 1982, though the musicians were unaware of Monk's death during the recording session and had not planned the album as a memorial tribute.

== Reception ==
Professional ratings
Review scores
Source	Rating
AllMusic	4/5 stars

In his review on AllMusic, Ron Wynn states: "Tremendous tribute effort, outstanding versions of Monk classics. Top-flight Monk repertory effort."

== Track listing ==
All compositions by Thelonious Monk.

1. "Four in One" – 6:54
2. "Light Blue" – 3:38
3. "Monk's Dream" – 6:01
4. "Evidence" – 6:01
5. "Reflections" – 5:58
6. "Eronel" – 6:53

== Personnel ==
- Charlie Rouse – tenor saxophone
- Kenny Barron – piano
- Buster Williams – bass
- Ben Riley – drum
