= Spiral (Kenny Barron album) =

Studio album by Kenny Barron
- Released: 1982
- Recorded: June 21, 1982
- Studio: Teichiku Kaikan Studio, Tokyo, Japan
- Genre: Jazz
- Length: 41:41
- Label: Baybridge; KUX-174-B
- Producer: Takeo Yokota

Kenny Barron chronology
Imo Live (1982)	Spiral (1982)	Flight Path (1983)

Spiral is a solo album by pianist Kenny Barron, recorded in 1982 and first released on the Japanese Baybridge label.

== Reception ==
Professional ratings
Review scores
Source	Rating
AllMusic	4/5 stars

In his review on AllMusic, Ken Dryden notes: "One of the more obscure releases by Kenny Barron, this hard to find CD of solo piano is worth seeking".

== Track listing ==
All compositions by Kenny Barron except where noted.

1. "Spiral" – 11:12
2. "Passion Dance" (McCoy Tyner) – 3:52
3. "Reflections" (Thelonious Monk) – 4:57
4. "Dolores Street, S.F." – 9:35
5. "Little Niles" (Randy Weston) – 6:05
6. "Maiden Voyage" (Herbie Hancock) – 5:06

== Personnel ==
- Kenny Barron – piano
