= Peg Leg (album) =

Studio album by Ron Carter
- Released: 1978
- Recorded: November 16, 18, 21 & 22. 1977
- Studio: Van Gelder Studio, Englewood Cliffs, NJ
- Genre: Jazz
- Length: 39:55
- Label: Milestone
- Producer: Ron Carter

Ron Carter chronology
Third Plane (1977)	Peg Leg (1978)	A Song for You (1978)

Professional ratings
Review scores
Source	Rating
The Penguin Guide to Jazz Recordings	3/4 stars

Peg Leg is an album by jazz bassist Ron Carter, originally released on LP in 1978 and released on CD in 1991 by Fantasy Studios.

It was recorded in November 1977 and prominently features Carter on piccolo bass. Often carrying the melody the instrument is a focus of 3 of the album's 6 tracks, while fellow bass player Buster Williams performs the conventional role of the instrument on those tracks. The rhythm section is completed by piano and percussion (on all but 1 track), and guitar on 4 tracks. The standard jazz-ensemble is further augmented, on all 6 tracks, by woodwinds (see below).

Carter uses a piccolo bass tuned a fourth higher than a normal double bass (low to high: A-D-G-C).

== Track listing ==
All compositions by Ron Carter except where noted

1. "Peg Leg" - 8:08
2. "Sheila's Song (Hasta Luego, Mi Amiga)" - 6:14
3. "Chapter XI" - 5:41
4. "Epistrophy" (Thelonious Monk) - 7:33
5. "My Ship" (Kurt Weill, Ira Gershwin) - 5:10
6. "Patchouli" - 7:06

== Personnel ==
- Ron Carter - piccolo bass, bass, percussion
- Kenny Barron - piano
- Jay Berliner - guitar
- Buster Williams - bass (tracks 1, 3 and 4)
- Ben Riley - drums, percussion

Woodwinds arranged and conducted by Robert M Freedman:

- Jerry Dodgion - flute, piccolo flute, alto flute, clarinet
- George Marge - flute, piccolo flute, oboe, clarinet
- Walter Kane - flute, bassoon, clarinet
- Charles Russo - clarinet, bass clarinet
