= What If? (Kenny Barron album) =

Studio album by Kenny Barron
- Released: 1986
- Recorded: February 17, 1986
- Studio: Van Gelder Studio, Englewood Cliffs, NJ
- Genre: Jazz
- Length: 42:19
- Label: Enja; 5013
- Producer: Matthias Winckelmann

Kenny Barron chronology
Sphere on Tour (1985)	What If? (1986)	Two as One (1987)

What If? is an album by pianist Kenny Barron recorded in 1986 and released on the German Enja label.

== Reception ==
Professional ratings
Review scores
Source	Rating
Allmusic	4.5/5 stars

In his review on Allmusic, Greg Turner noted: "Long considered as one of the finest pianists in jazz, Barron's excellent composing skills are also evident on this worthy addition to his discography".

== Track listing ==
All compositions by Kenny Barron except where noted.

1. "Phantoms" – 7:02
2. "What If?" – 7:26
3. "Close to You Alone" (Cecil McBee) – 5:58
4. "Dexterity" (Charlie Parker) – 3:57
5. "Voyage" – 5:03
6. "Lullabye" – 7:09
7. "Trinkle, Tinkle" (Thelonious Monk) – 5:43

== Personnel ==
- Kenny Barron – piano
- Wallace Roney – trumpet (tracks 1, 2, 5 & 6)
- John Stubblefield – tenor saxophone (tracks 1, 2, 5 & 6)
- Cecil McBee – bass (tracks 1–3, 5 & 6)
- Victor Lewis – drums (tracks 1–6)
