= Soul Mates (album) =

Studio album by Charlie Rouse and Sahib Shihab
- Released: 1993
- Recorded: July 6 & 7, 1988
- Studio: Van Gelder Studio, Englewood Cliffs, NJ
- Genre: Jazz
- Length: 62:25
- Label: Uptown; UP 27.34
- Producer: Mabel Fraser, Robert E. Sunenblick MD.

Charlie Rouse chronology
| Social Call (1984) | Soul Mates (1993) | Epistrophy (1989) |

Sahib Shihab chronology
| Flute Summit (1973) | Soul Mates (1993) |

Soul Mates is an album by saxophonists Charlie Rouse and Sahib Shihab which was recorded in 1988 and released on the Uptown label in 1993.

== Reception ==
Professional ratings
Review scores
| Source | Rating |
|---|---|
| AllMusic | 4.5/5 stars |
| The Penguin Guide to Jazz Recordings | 3/4 stars |
| The Rolling Stone Jazz & Blues Album Guide | 4/5 stars |

The AllMusic review by Scott Yanow called it an "exciting studio date" and stated: "On a sad note, by the time this Uptown CD was finally released in 1993, Rouse, Shihab, and Davis had all passed away".

The authors of The Penguin Guide to Jazz Recordings noted that Rouse "solos nicely throughout, and there are few signs of flagging energy, even given that he hadn't long to live thereafter."

== Track listing ==
1. "November Afternoon" (Tom McIntosh) – 5:49
2. "Green Chimneys" (Thelonious Monk) – 5:12
3. "Prayer Song" (Ray Bryant) – 5:42
4. "So Nice" (Elmo Hope) – 5:10
5. "Soul Mates" (Mal Waldron) – 6:08
6. "Bohemia After Dark (Oscar Pettiford) – 5:41
7. "Soft Shoulder (Lonnie Hillyer) – 6:02
8. "I'm Never Happy" (Tadd Dameron) – 7:45
9. "DiDa" (Sahib Shihab) – 4:54
10. "Bittersweet" (Mike Corda) – 5:29
11. "Bird's Nest" (Charlie Rouse) – 4:29

== Personnel ==
- Charlie Rouse - tenor saxophone
- Sahib Shihab – baritone saxophone (Tracks: 1–3, 5, 6, 8, 9)
- Claudio Roditi – trumpet, flugelhorn (Tracks: 1–4, 7, 11)
- Walter Davis Jr. – piano
- Santi Debriano – bass
- Victor Lewis – drums
- Don Sickler – arranger
