= Sphere on Tour =

Live album by Sphere
- Released: 1988
- Recorded: November 21, 1985
- Venue: Bologna, Italy
- Genre: Jazz
- Length: 50:10
- Label: Red; VPA 191
- Producer: Alberto Alberti and Sergio Veschi

Sphere chronology
Flight Path (1983)	Sphere on Tour (1988)	Pumpkin's Delight (1986)

Kenny Barron chronology
Scratch (1985)	Sphere on Tour (1985)	What If? (1986)

Sphere on Tour is a live album by the group Sphere featuring saxophonist Charlie Rouse, pianist Kenny Barron, bassist Buster Williams, and drummer Ben Riley, recorded in Italy in 1985 and released on the Italian Red label.

== Reception ==
Professional ratings
Review scores
Source	Rating
Allmusic	3/5 stars

In his review on Allmusic, Ron Wynn noted: "Sphere was one of the great repertory groups to emerge in the '80s."

== Track listing ==
1. "Dual Force" (Buster Williams) – 7:40
2. "A Beautiful Friendship" (Donald Kahn, Stanley Styne) – 10:10
3. "Scratch" (Kenny Barron) – 7:45
4. "Tayamisha" (Williams) – 5:15
5. "Spiral" (Barron) – 11:00
6. "Well, You Needn't" (Thelonious Monk) – 8:20

== Personnel ==
- Charlie Rouse – tenor saxophone
- Kenny Barron – piano
- Buster Williams – bass
- Ben Riley – drums
