= Epistrophy (Charlie Rouse album) =

Live album by Charlie Rouse
- Released: 1989
- Recorded: October 10, 1988
- Venue: Bimbo´s 365 Club, San Francisco, CA
- Genre: Jazz
- Length: 63:49
- Label: Landmark; LLP/LCD 1521
- Producer: Orrin Keepnews

Charlie Rouse chronology
Soul Mates (1993)	Epistrophy (1989)

Epistrophy, sub-titled The Last Concert, is a live album by saxophonist Charlie Rouse which was recorded in 1988 in San Francisco and released on Orrin Keepnews' Landmark label the following year.

== Reception ==
Professional ratings
Review scores
Source	Rating
AllMusic	4.5/5 stars
MusicHound Jazz	4/5 stars
The Penguin Guide to Jazz	4/4 stars
The Rolling Stone Jazz & Blues Album Guide	4/5 stars
The Virgin Encyclopedia of Jazz	3/5 stars

The AllMusic review by Scott Yanow stated: "This historic event... finds Rouse in prime form despite the fact that he had just seven weeks to live... The date was special from the start, with producer Orrin Keepnews getting Rouse to say a few words to the audience about his time with Monk... A historic occasion that resulted in near-classic music; highly recommended".

Duck Baker of Jazz Times wrote: "The sentimental interest of this last date... is matched by music of considerable value. Rouse knew his time was short, and some of his playing... is very emotional. Kudos to George Cables and Jessica Williams... for very fine and appropriately monastic piano work."

The authors of The Penguin Guide to Jazz Recordings noted that Rouse "runs through the songbook... with magisterial calm," and commented: "Rouse invests each of the numbers with the kind of rhythmic slant that is inalienably bound up with Monk's legacy."

== Track listing ==
All compositions by Thelonious Monk except where noted.

1. Some Words About Monk – 3:11
2. "Nutty" – 6:55
3. "Ruby, My Dear" – 7:46
4. "Blue Monk" – 9:11
5. "In Walked Bud" – 9:27
6. "´Round Midnight" – 16:16
7. "Epistrophy" (Monk, Kenny Clarke) – 11:03

== Personnel ==
- Charlie Rouse – tenor saxophone (tracks 2–4, 6 & 7)
- Don Cherry – trumpet (tracks 6 & 7)
- Buddy Montgomery – vibraphone (tracks 5–7)
- George Cables (tracks 2, 3 & 5–7), Jessica Williams (track 4) – piano
- Jeff Chambers – bass (tracks 2–7)
- Ralph Penland – drums (tracks 2–7)
