= Moment's Notice (album) =

Studio album by Charlie Rouse
- Released: 1978
- Recorded: October 20, 1977
- Studio: New York City
- Genre: Jazz
- Length: 1:09:11
- Label: Jazzcraft Records; Jazzcraft 4 Storyville Records; SLP 4079
- Producer: Lars Johansen

Charlie Rouse chronology
Cinnamon Flower (1977)	Moment's Notice (1978)	The Upper Manhattan Jazz Society (1985)

Moment's Notice is an album by jazz saxophonist Charlie Rouse. It was recorded on October 20, 1977, and was released on LP in 1978 by both Storyville Records and the Danish label Jazzcraft. On the album, Rouse is joined by pianist Hugh Lawson, bassist Bob Cranshaw, and drummer Ben Riley. In 1997, the album was reissued on CD with four alternate takes.

== Reception ==
Professional ratings
Review scores
Source	Rating
AllMusic	4/5 stars
The Penguin Guide to Jazz	4/4 stars

In a review for AllMusic, Scott Yanow called the album "a fine straight-ahead set," noting Rouse's "immediately recognizable tone," and wrote: "Other than Thelonious Monk's 'Well You Needn't' and Thad Jones' 'A Child Is Born,' the material is somewhat obscure... and generally a bit complex, but always swinging. A fine effort."

Writing for Jazz Times, Miles Jordan commented: "Rouse's melodic playing perfectly illuminates each piece and the rhythm section is faultless."

== Track listing (original LP release) ==
1. "The Clucker" (Hugh Lawson) – 4:58
2. "Let Me" (Charlie Rouse) – 5:44
3. "Joobobie" (Hugh Lawson) – 7:08
4. "Well You Needn't" (Thelonious Monk) – 4:56
5. "Royal Love" (Shirley Scott) – 7:29
6. "A Child Is Born" (Thad Jones) – 7:59
7. "Little Sherri" (Charlie Rouse) – 5:08

== Alternate takes on CD reissue ==
1. "Royal Love" (Shirley Scott) – 9:00
2. "Let Me" (Charlie Rouse) – 6:26
3. "The Clucker" (Hugh Lawson) – 4:49
4. "Well You Needn't" (Thelonious Monk) – 5:34

== Personnel ==
- Charlie Rouse – tenor saxophone
- Hugh Lawson – piano
- Bob Cranshaw – bass
- Ben Riley – drums
