= The Upper Manhattan Jazz Society =

Studio album by Charlie Rouse, Benny Bailey and Albert Dailey
- Released: 1985
- Recorded: November 1981
- Studio: New York City
- Genre: Jazz
- Length: 37:59
- Label: Enja; 4090
- Producer: Robert Hutchins, John Heilbrunn

Charlie Rouse chronology
Moment's Notice (1983)	The Upper Manhattan Jazz Society (1985)	Social Call (1984)

Benny Bailey chronology
Grand Slam (1978)	The Upper Manhattan Jazz Society (1985)	While My Lady Sleeps (1990)

The Upper Manhattan Jazz Society is an album by saxophonist Charlie Rouse and trumpeter Benny Bailey which was recorded in 1981 and released on the Enja label in 1985.

== Reception ==
Professional ratings
Review scores
Source	Rating
AllMusic	4.5/5 stars
MusicHound Jazz	3/5 stars
The Rolling Stone Jazz & Blues Album Guide	4/5 stars

The AllMusic review by Scott Yanow stated "The music is quite modern and none of the pieces have exactly caught on. However, the blend and contrast between Rouse and Bailey, plus the strong rhythm section, makes this a set of interest to collectors of acoustic jazz".

== Track listing ==
1. "Lil' Sherry" (Charles Rouse) – 4:50
2. "Spelunke" (Fritz Pauer) – 9:36
3. "Naima's Love Song" (John Hicks) – 8:02
4. "Mr. McKee" (Albert Dailey) – 5:19
5. "After the Morning" (Hicks) – 10:12

== Personnel ==
- Charlie Rouse – tenor saxophone
- Benny Bailey – trumpet
- Albert Dailey – piano
- Buster Williams – bass
- Keith Copeland – drums
