= The Red Barron Duo =

Studio album by Kenny Barron and Red Mitchell
- Released: 1988
- Recorded: August 19, 1986
- Venue: Red Mitchell's livingroom, Stockholm, Sweden
- Genre: Jazz
- Length: 58:20
- Label: Storyville; SLP 4137
- Producer: Red Mitchell and Kenny Barron

Kenny Barron chronology
Pumpkin's Delight (1986)	The Red Barron Duo (1988)	Live at Fat Tuesdays (1988)

Red Mitchell chronology
To Duke and Basie (1986)	The Red Barron Duo (1986)	Duo (1987)

The Red Barron Duo is an album by pianist Kenny Barron and bassist Red Mitchell recorded in Stockholm and released on the Dutch Storyville label.

== Reception ==
Professional ratings
Review scores
Source	Rating
Allmusic	4/5 stars
The Penguin Guide to Jazz Recordings	3/4 stars

In his review on Allmusic, Scott Yanow noted: "Their interpretations swing, are sometimes intuitive and are full of subtle surprises. Barron has since been recognized as a giant of modern mainstream piano while the late Mitchell's virtuosity was never in question. This combination works!"

== Track listing ==
1. "The Girl Next Door" (Ralph Blane, Hugh Martin) – 6:14
2. "Oleo" (Sonny Rollins) – 6:19
3. "Sunshower" (Kenny Barron) – 9:40
4. "Bureau Blues" (Red Mitchell) – 6:59
5. "Finally" (Mitchell) – 7:22
6. "On the Sunny Side of the Street" (Jimmy McHugh, Dorothy Fields) – 6:40
7. "Namely You" (Gene de Paul, Johnny Mercer) – 8:42 Bonus track on CD
8. "Darn That Dream" (Jimmy Van Heusen, Eddie DeLange) – 7:05 Bonus track on CD

== Personnel ==
- Kenny Barron – piano
- Red Mitchell – bass
