= Autumn in New York (Kenny Barron album) =

Studio album by Kenny Barron, Rufus Reid and Frederick Waits
- Released: 1985
- Recorded: December 14, 1984
- Studio: Van Gelder Studio, Englewood Cliffs, NJ
- Genre: Jazz
- Length: 57:00
- Label: Uptown; UP 27.26
- Producer: Robert E. Sunenblick M.D. and David A. Sunenblick

Kenny Barron chronology
Landscape (1984)	Autumn in New York (1985)	Scratch (1985)

New York Attitude cover

Autumn in New York is an album by pianist Kenny Barron with bassist Rufus Reid and drummer Frederick Waits, which was recorded in late 1984 and released on the Uptown label. The album was rereleased on CD in 1996 as New York Attitude with three bonus tracks.

== Reception ==
Professional ratings
Review scores
Source	Rating
AllMusic	4/5 stars

In his review on AllMusic, Ken Dryden stated, "Pianist Kenny Barron's star began to rise in the 1980 as he recorded more frequently as a leader. Uptown releases such as this one have been hard to find because of erratic distribution, but this trio date with bassist Rufus Reid and drummer Frederick Waites (in one of his last record dates prior to his death in 1989) is worth the effort to acquire it. ... The pristine sound achieved by legendary engineer Rudy Van Gelder is an added bonus. Highly recommended."

== Track listing ==
All compositions by Kenny Barron except where noted.

1. "New York Attitude" - 5:58
2. "Embraceable You" (George Gershwin, Ira Gershwin) - 5:49
3. "Joanne Julia" - 5:39
4. "My One Sin (In Life)" (Vittoria Mascheroni, Gian Testoni, Robert Mellin ) - 5:23 Bonus track on CD reissue
5. "Bemsha Swing" (Thelonious Monk, Denzil Best) - 6:50
6. "Autumn in New York" (Vernon Duke) - 8:00
7. "Lemuria" - 5:08
8. "You Don't Know What Love Is" (Gene de Paul, Don Raye) - 6:24 Bonus track on CD reissue
9. "Embraceable You" [take 1] (George Gershwin, Ira Gershwin) - 7:49 Bonus track on CD reissue

== Personnel ==
- Kenny Barron – piano
- Rufus Reid – bass
- Frederick Waits - drums
