= Tiger Onitsuka =

Japanese jazz drummer

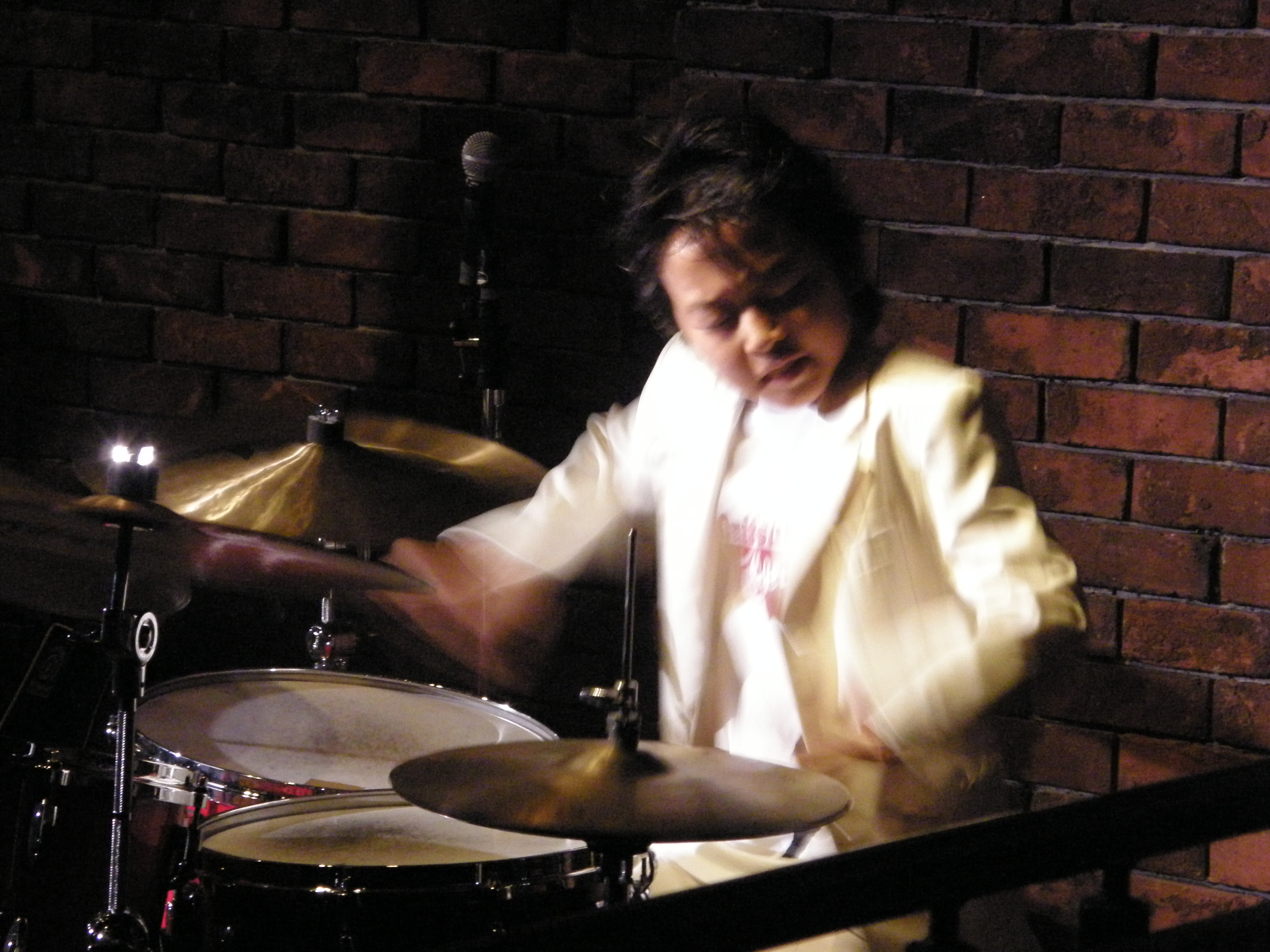
- Onitsuka playing, March 2010

Background information
- Birth name: Taiga Onitsuka (鬼束 大我, Onitsuka Taiga)
- Also known as: "Tiger"
- Born: 9 July 1998 (age 26)
- Origin: Kyoto, Japan
- Genres: Jazz
- Instrument: Drums
- Years active: 2004 – Present
- Labels: Spice Records, Savoy Records
- Website: http://www.taiga-jazz.com/

Tiger Onitsuka (鬼束 大我, Onitsuka Taiga, born 9 July 1998) is a Japanese jazz drummer, who holds the Guinness World Record for being "The World's Youngest Professional Jazz Drummer" after releasing his first album, Tiger! on the Columbia/Savoy label at the age of 9 years old in April 2008.

== Biography ==
Onitsuka started playing the drums from the age of 5. He released his first DVD, I Got Jazz, when he was 6, soon after he started playing on stage.

He performed at a concert in Harlem and Manhattan, New York in 2005 at the age of 7.

Followed by a concert at a national treasure and a World Heritage Site Kamigamo Shrine in Kyoto, on 7 October 2007, Onitsuka performed at the Yokohama Jazz Promenade. In November 2007, Onitsuka performed at the 3rd Ginza International Jazz Festival with his band "Tiger, Burning Bright".

In 2008, Onitsuka performed with Eddie Henderson (tp) in New York City and with Marlon Jordan (tp) in New Orleans, followed by concerts in Korea, Singapore and Spain. Back in Japan, followed by the performances at Blue Note Nagoya, Tokyo Midtown, and the premiere of Tokyo Jazz, he had a concert with Hank Jones. At the time, Jones being 88 and Onitsuka 8, their age difference was 80 years and as the biggest age differences between players in one band, it drew great interests of the media.

In October 2008, Onitsuka released his third album, A Time in New York, recorded at Clinton Recording Studio in New York with the two top jazz musicians, bassist Buster Williams and pianist Benny Green, both of whom remarked on Onitsuka's impressive musical skills.

In 2013, Onitsuka recorded two albums in New Orleans with Ellis Marsalis (p), Kermit Ruffins (vo, to), Corey Henry (tb) and so on. Marsalis and Ruffins were impressed with young Onitsuka's talent and they both invited him to play on their stages at Satchmo Summer Festival held the following week.

In 2014, he passed the audition for The Juilliard School Pre-college after taking classical percussion lessons with Hiroshi Sakagami, acquiring within 6 months the techniques to play the snare drum, the tympani and the marimba with 4 mallets.

He is the youngest jazz drum instructor at Music Labo, a private music school in Kyoto since 2009, and he leads the experimental courses for young children aspiring to be drummers.

He has been offered wardrobes and shoes as endorsement by Onitsuka Tiger of ASICS since 2006 due to the similarity in names.

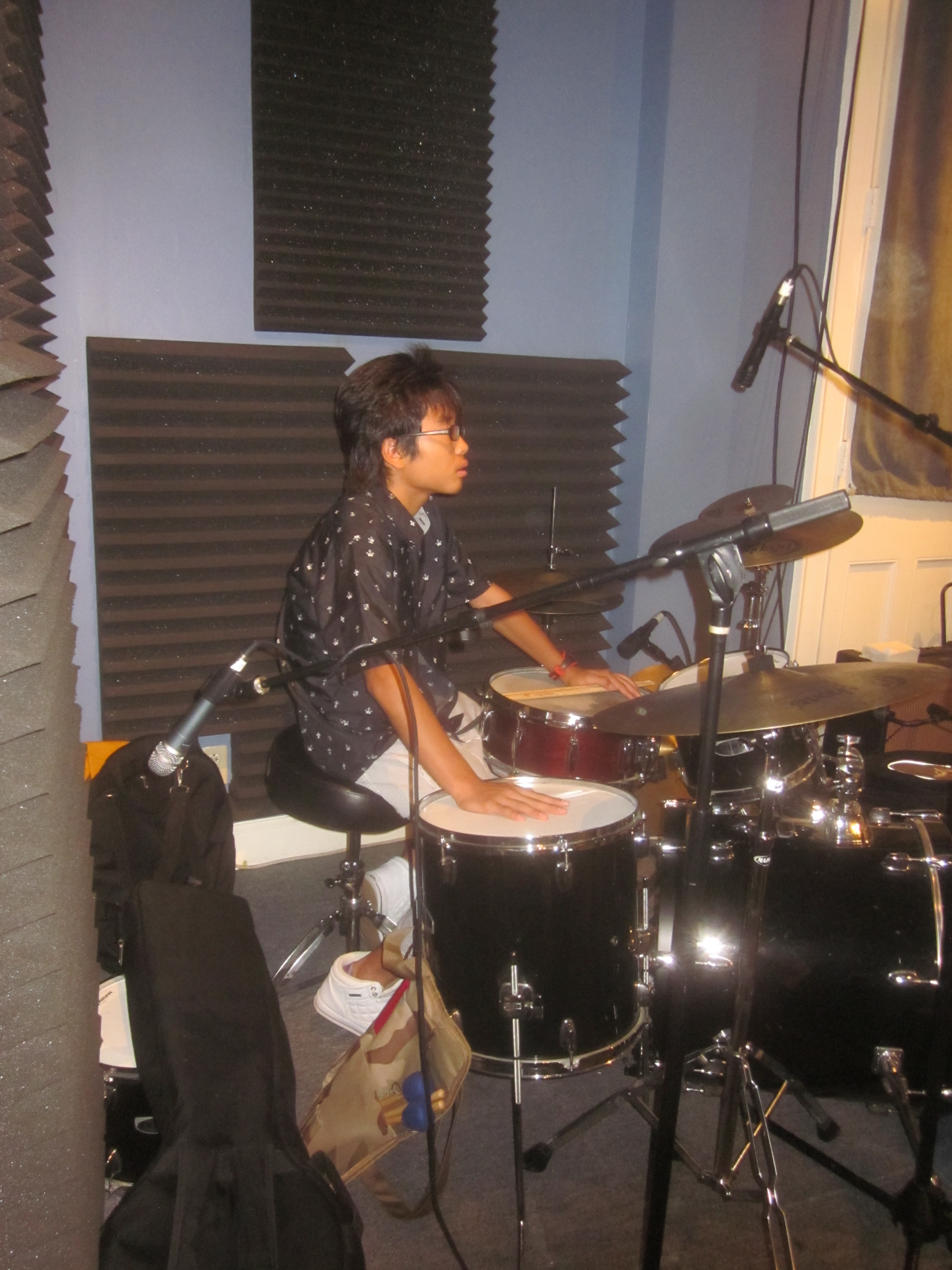
At radio station WWOZ in New Orleans, August 2013.

Tiger Onitsuka has played with musicians including Hank Jones(p), Eddie Henderson (tp), Buster Williams (b), Benny Green (p), Lou Donaldson (as), Evelyn Blakey (vo), Mitsuru "Nishi" Nishiyama (b), Terumasa Hino (tp), Toshiko Akiyoshi (p), Othello Molineaux (steel drum), Kermit Ruffins (vo, tp), Clifton Anderson (tb), Marlon Jordan (tp), Delfeayo Marsalis (tb), Henry Franklin (b), Paul Jackson (b), John Farnsworth (ts), Yosuke Yamashita (p), Mike LeDonne (p), Greg Bandy (dr), Tommy Campbell (dr), Tony Williams (as), Carlton Holms(p), Dwayne Burno(b), Satoshi Inoue (g), Kengo Nakamura (b), Eiji Kitamura (cl), Kazumi Watanabe (g), Mingus Big Band, Sienna Wind Orchestra, Yutaka Sado (Conductor) among others.

== Discography ==
=== Albums ===
- Tiger! (23 April 2008 from Columbia Savoy Label)
- Incredible Tiger - Live (23 April 2008 from Spicerecords)
- A Time in New York (22 October 2008 from Columbia Savoy Label)
- The Land of Dreams (2013 from TRJ Records)
- The Land of Rebirth (2013 from TRJ Records)

=== Albums (as Tiger, Burning Bright) ===
- What's Happiness (2007 from TRJ Records)
- Cathedral (2007 from TRJ Records)

=== DVD ===
- I Got Jazz (June 2004 from TRJ Records)
