= Live at Fat Tuesdays =

Live album by Kenny Barron
- Released: 1988
- Recorded: January 15–16, 1988
- Venues: Fat Tuesdays, NYC
- Genre: Jazz
- Length: 68:21
- Labels: Enja; 5071
- Producer: Matthias Winckelmann

Kenny Barron chronology
The Red Barron Duo (1986)	Live at Fat Tuesdays (1988)	Bird Songs (1988)

Live at Fat Tuesdays is a live album by pianist Kenny Barron that was recorded in 1988 and released on the German Enja label.

== Reception ==
Professional ratings
Review scores
Source	Rating
Allmusic	3/5 stars

In his review on Allmusic, Ron Wynn noted: "Barron stretches out and plays both flashy and easy, hot and cool, on this '88 set cut at Fat Tuesday's in New York."

== Track listing ==
All compositions by Kenny Barron except where noted.

1. "There Is No Greater Love" (Isham Jones, Marty Symes) – 8:34
2. "Misterioso" (Thelonious Monk) – 7:18
3. "Lunacy" – 8:24
4. "Sand Dune" – 12:14
5. "518" – 10:02
6. "Something for Ramone" (John Stubblefield) – 11:18 Bonus track on CD
7. "Dreams" (Eddie Henderson) – 12:11 Bonus track on CD

== Personnel ==
- Kenny Barron – piano
- Eddie Henderson – trumpet (tracks 1 & 3–7)
- John Stubblefield – tenor saxophone (tracks 1 & 3–7)
- Cecil McBee – bass (tracks 1 & 3–7)
- Victor Lewis – drums (tracks 1 & 3–7)
