= Weaver of Dreams (Ben Riley album) =

Studio album by Ben Riley
- Released: 1996
- Recorded: August 26, 1993
- Studio: Systems Two, Brooklyn, New York
- Genre: Jazz
- Length: 1:01:23
- Label: Joken Records; BK-105
- Producer: Kenny Barron, Joanne Klein

Ben Riley chronology
Weaver of Dreams (1996)	Memories of T (2006)

Weaver of Dreams is an album by drummer Ben Riley. His first release as a leader, it was recorded on August 26, 1993, at Systems Two in Brooklyn, New York, and was issued on CD in 1996 by Joken Records. On the album, Riley is joined by saxophonist Ralph Moore and double bassist Buster Williams.

== Reception ==
Professional ratings
Review scores
Source	Rating
AllMusic	4.5/5 stars
The Penguin Guide to Jazz	3.5/4 stars

In a review for AllMusic, Michael G. Nastos noted that Riley is "upfront in the mix, thankfully, so you hear his melodic ideas, on sticks and brushes, with authentic clarity," and wrote: "Don't be discouraged that this is a stereotypically typical drummer's date -- it isn't. You'll hear many solos, but they're all good. The result is much fine music on this 60-plus-minute CD baring the soul of a great jazz drummer."

The authors of The Penguin Guide to Jazz Recordings stated: "Despite his seniority, Ben Riley hasn't hitherto thought to make the jump from engine-room to bridge... Never underestimate Riley, though... for all his delicacy of touch, he's never been a player to mess with... The real surprise is that we haven't heard stuff like this from Ben before."

Jeff Potter of Modern Drummer commented: "where many drummers have floundered before, jazz great Ben Riley shows us the right stuff. His musical, 'melodic,' form-conscious, not to mention swinging drumming makes it all work... this master's kit work sings."

== Track listing ==
1. "Black Nile" (Wayne Shorter) – 6:07
2. "Sweet and Lovely" (Gus Arnheim, Charles N. Daniels, Harry Tobias) – 8:36
3. "Witchcraft" (Cy Coleman, Carolyn Leigh) – 6:29
4. "Tokudo" (Buster Williams) – 7:53
5. "Weaver of Dreams" (Jack Elliott, Victor Young) – 6:33
6. "Solar" (Miles Davis) – 7:58
7. "You Don't Know What Love Is" (Don Raye, Gene de Paul) – 7:49
8. "I Mean You" (Thelonious Monk) – 6:27
9. "Doonda" (Ben Riley) – 3:39

== Personnel ==
- Ben Riley – drums
- Ralph Moore – saxophone
- Buster Williams – double bass
