= Teatro Morlacchi =

Theatre in Perugia, Italy

Coordinates: 43.1133°N 12.3868°E

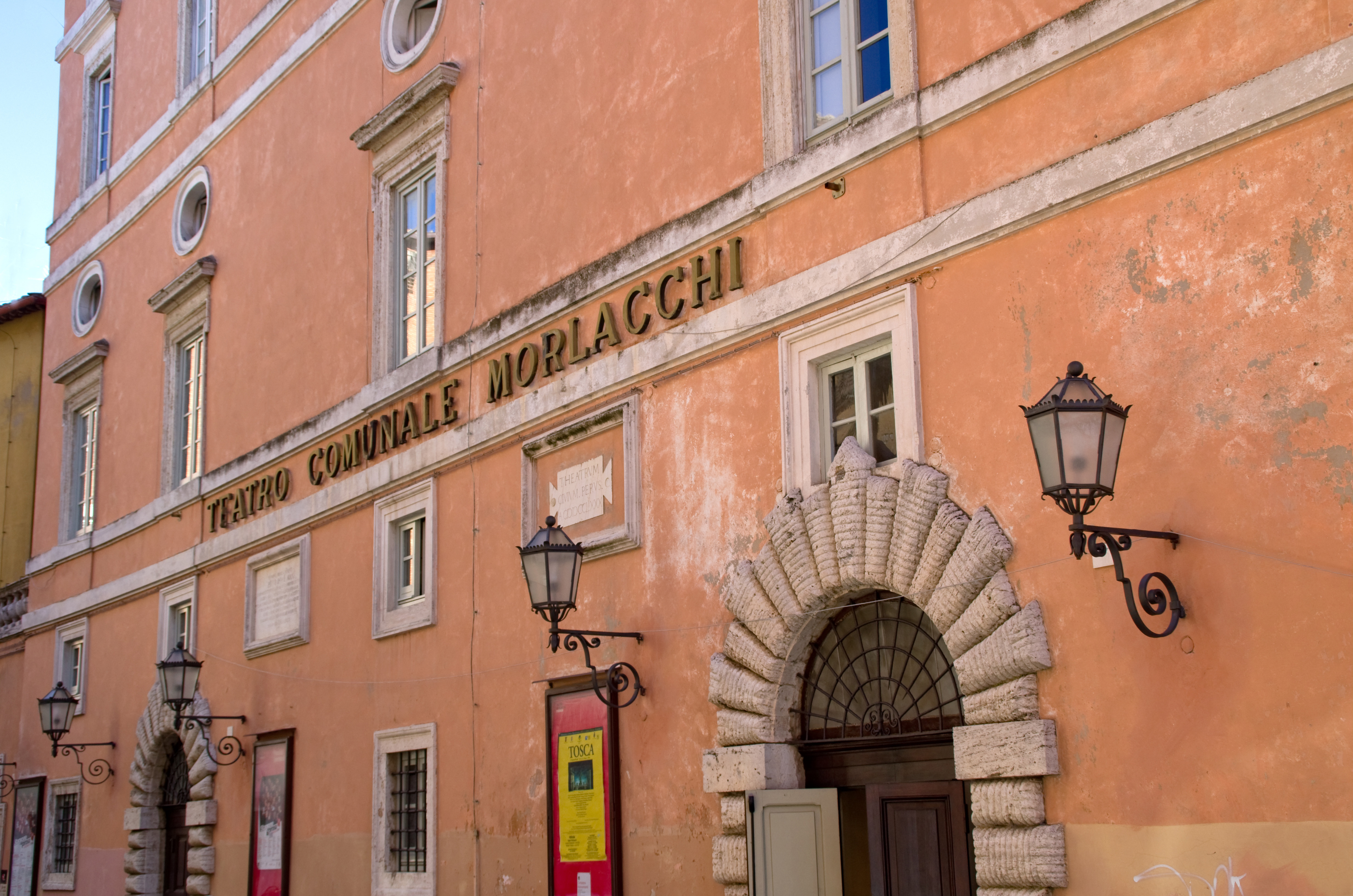
Teatro Morlacchi

Teatro Morlacchi, formerly Teatro del Verzaro, is the largest theater of Perugia. It is named after the musician Francesco Morlacchi.

== History ==
In 1777 the local middle class decided to build a new theater in response to the nobles who had built the Teatro del Pavone; ninety families then formed the "Society for the construction of a new theater", which bought an old convent and commissioned the project to architect Alessio Lorenzini. Lorenzini gave the hall the classic shape of a horseshoe and facing with the problem of limited space, having to reserve a box for each client family, he decided to set up the entire structure diagonally and to reduce the entrance hall.

The works began in June 1778, and ended in April 1780. The inauguration was held on August 15, 1781, and the theater could seat 1,200 people at the time.

In 1874 it was renovated by Guglielmo Calderini, who gave the theater its current structure; simultaneously it was redecorated by artists like Francesco Moretti and Mariano Piervittori, who worked on the curtain of the ceiling. At the new inauguration of the theater it was named after the Perugia-born musician Francesco Morlacchi.

The activities of the theater continued until the early twentieth century, but declined during the years of Fascism until it was requisitioned by the Germans during the occupation of the city and allocated to shows for their soldiers. After the war, the theater was seriously damaged and the City between 1951 and 1953 financed the restoration work, which included a re-roofing and the modification of stage, orchestra pit and marble floors.

Currently the theater has 785 seats. The stage is 20 metres (66 feet) wide and 10.5 metres (34 feet) deep. The proscenium is also 10.5 metres (34 feet) wide.
