= Sphere (American band) =

American jazz band

- Origin: 1977
- Genres: Jazz
- Years active: 1977–1988; 1997–2002
- Labels: Elektra Musician, Verve, Red
- Past members: Kenny Barron; Buster Williams; Ben Riley; Charlie Rouse; Gary Bartz

Sphere was an American jazz band which began as a tribute to pianist Thelonious Monk, whose middle name was "Sphere".

The band, which was formed in 1977, consisted of pianist Kenny Barron, bassist Buster Williams, and two members who had been Monk's bandmates, drummer Ben Riley and saxophonist Charlie Rouse. After Rouse died in 1988, Sphere disbanded but reunited ten years later with Gary Bartz taking Rouse's place.

Sphere recorded its first album, consisting of Monk tunes, on the day that Monk died, February 17, 1982. The band recorded several more albums which included jazz standards and original compositions.

According to Riley, an interesting group dynamic resulted from the fact that the band included two musicians who had played with Monk and two musicians who hadn't. He reflected: "It was good for the other guys... to hear the music in a way Monk would have written it and orchestrated it. It made them think of the music in a different way. It was also good for us to hear their interpretations of Monk's music. The music was always fresh."

== Discography ==
- 1982: Four in One (Elektra/Musician)
- 1983: Flight Path (Elektra/Musician)
- 1985: Sphere on Tour (Red)
- 1986: Pumpkin's Delight (Red) contains all tracks released on Live at Umbria Jazz (Red)
- 1987: Four for All (Verve)
- 1988: Bird Songs (Verve)
- 1997: Sphere (Verve)
