= Charlie Rouse =

American saxophonist and flautist (1924–1988)

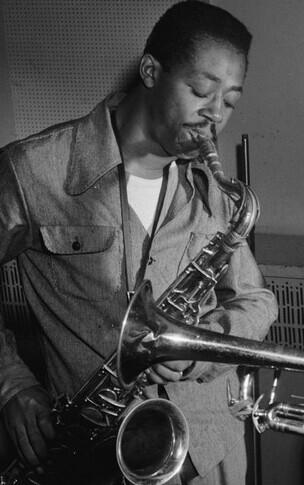
- Rouse, in a c. 1947 photo taken by William P. Gottlieb

Background information
- Born: April 6, 1924; Washington, D.C., U.S.
- Died: November 30, 1988 (aged 64) Seattle, Washington, U.S.
- Genres: Jazz; bebop; hard bop
- Occupation: Musician
- Instruments: Tenor saxophone; flute
- Years active: mid-1940s–1980s
- Labels: Blue Note; Enja; Strata-East; Landmark

Charlie Rouse (April 6, 1924 – November 30, 1988) was an American hard bop tenor saxophonist and flautist. His career is marked by his collaboration with Thelonious Monk, which lasted for more than ten years.

== Biography ==
Rouse was born in Washington, D.C., United States. At first, he worked with the clarinet before turning to the tenor saxophone.

Rouse began his career with the Billy Eckstine Orchestra in 1944, followed by the Dizzy Gillespie Big Band in 1945, the Duke Ellington Orchestra from 1949 to 1950, the Count Basie Octet in 1950, Bull Moose Jackson and His Buffalo Bearcats in 1953, and the Oscar Pettiford Sextet in 1955. He made his recording debut with Tadd Dameron in 1947, and in 1957, made a notable album with Paul Quinichette.

He was a member of Thelonious Monk's quartet from 1959 to 1970. In the 1980s, he was a founding member of the group Sphere, which began as a tribute to Monk.

Rouse died from lung cancer on November 30, 1988, at University Hospital in Seattle at the age of 64.

== Honors ==
The asteroid 10426 Charlierouse was officially named to honor Rouse by American astronomer Joe Montani of Spacewatch, who discovered it in 1999. Earlier, in 1994, asteroid 11091 Thelonious had also been discovered and named by Montani.

== Discography ==
=== As leader ===
- 1957: The Chase Is On (Bethlehem) with Paul Quinichette
- 1958: When the Blues Comes On (Bethlehem) – with Paul Quinichette
- 1958: Just Wailin' (New Jazz) with Herbie Mann, Kenny Burrell, and Mal Waldron
- 1960: Takin' Care of Business (Jazzland)
- 1960: Yeah! (Epic) – reissued as Unsung Hero in 1990 with tracks from We Paid Our Dues
- 1961: We Paid Our Dues (Epic) – shared LP with Seldon Powell
- 1962: Bossa Nova Bacchanal (Blue Note)
- 1973: Two Is One (Strata-East)
- 1977: Cinnamon Flower (Casablanca) – also released as Brazil (Douglas Records)
- 1977: Moment's Notice (Storyville)
- 1981: The Upper Manhattan Jazz Society (Enja) – released 1985
- 1984: Social Call (Uptown) with Red Rodney
- 1988: Soul Mates (Uptown) with Sahib Shihab – released 1993
- 1988: Epistrophy (Landmark)

With Julius Watkins as Les Jazz Modes / The Jazz Modes

- 1956: Jazzville Vol. 1 (Dawn) – shared LP with Gene Quill–Dick Sherman Quintet
- 1956: Les Jazz Modes (Dawn)
- 1957: Mood in Scarlet (Dawn)
- 1958: The Most Happy Fella (Atlantic)
- 1959: The Jazz Modes (Atlantic)

With Sphere

- Four in One (Elektra/Musician, 1982)
- Flight Path (Elektra/Musician, 1983)
- Sphere on Tour (Red, 1985)
- Pumpkin's Delight (Red, 1986 [1993])
- Four for All (Verve, 1987)
- Bird Songs (Verve, 1988)

With The Stan Tracey Quartet

- Playin' In The Yard (Steam, 1987)

=== As sideman ===
With Dave Bailey

- Gettin' Into Somethin' (Epic, 1961)

With Clifford Brown

- Memorial Album (Blue Note, 1953)

With Donald Byrd

- Byrd in Hand (Blue Note, 1959)

With Benny Carter

- Further Definitions (Impulse!, 1961)

With Sonny Clark

- Leapin' and Lopin' (Blue Note, 1961)

With Art Farmer

- The Art Farmer Septet (Prestige, 1953–54)

With Joe Gordon

- Introducing Joe Gordon (EmArcy, 1954)

With Bennie Green

- Bennie Green Blows His Horn (Prestige, 1955)
- Back on the Scene (Blue Note, 1958)

With Hank Jones

- Groovin' High (Muse, 1978)

With Duke Jordan

- Les Liaisons Dangereuses (quintet) (Charlie Parker records 1962)
- Duke's Delight (SteepleChase, 1975)

With Thelonious Monk

- At Town Hall (Riverside, 1959)
- 5 by Monk by 5 (1959)
- At the Blackhawk (Riverside, 1960)
- Monk in France (Riverside, 1961)
- Thelonious Monk in Italy (Riverside, 1961 [1963])
- Monk in Copenhagen (1961)
- Criss-Cross (Columbia, 1962)
- Monk's Dream (Columbia, 1963)
- At Newport 1963 and 1965 (1963, 1965)
- Monterey Jazz Festival '63 (1963)
- Big Band and Quartet in Concert (Columbia, 1963)
- It's Monk's Time (Columbia, 1964)
- Monk (Columbia, 1964)
- Live at the It Club (Columbia, 1964)
- Live at the Jazz Workshop (Columbia, 1964)
- Monk in Paris (1965)
- Olympia, 6 Mars 1965 (1965)
- Olympia, 7 Mars 1965 (1965)
- Paris at Midnight (1965)
- Straight, No Chaser (Columbia, 1966)
- The Nonet – Live! (1967)
- Underground (Columbia, 1968)
- Palo Alto (recorded 1968, released on Impulse! Records 2020)
- Monk's Blues (Columbia, 1969)

With Oscar Pettiford

- Oscar Pettiford (Bethlehem, 1954)

With Louis Smith

- Smithville (Blue Note, 1958)

With Art Taylor

- Taylor's Wailers (Prestige, 1957)
- Taylor's Tenors (Prestige / New Jazz, 1959)

With Eddie "Cleanhead" Vinson

- Clean Head's Back in Town (Bethlehem, 1957)

With Mal Waldron

- The Git Go – Live at the Village Vanguard (Soul Note, 1986)
- The Seagulls of Kristiansund (Soul Note, 1986)

== Bibliography ==
- Cook, Richard; Morton, Brian (2008). The Penguin Guide to Jazz Recordings (9th ed.). London: Penguin Books.
