= Ron Carter discography =

This is the discography for American double bassist Ron Carter.

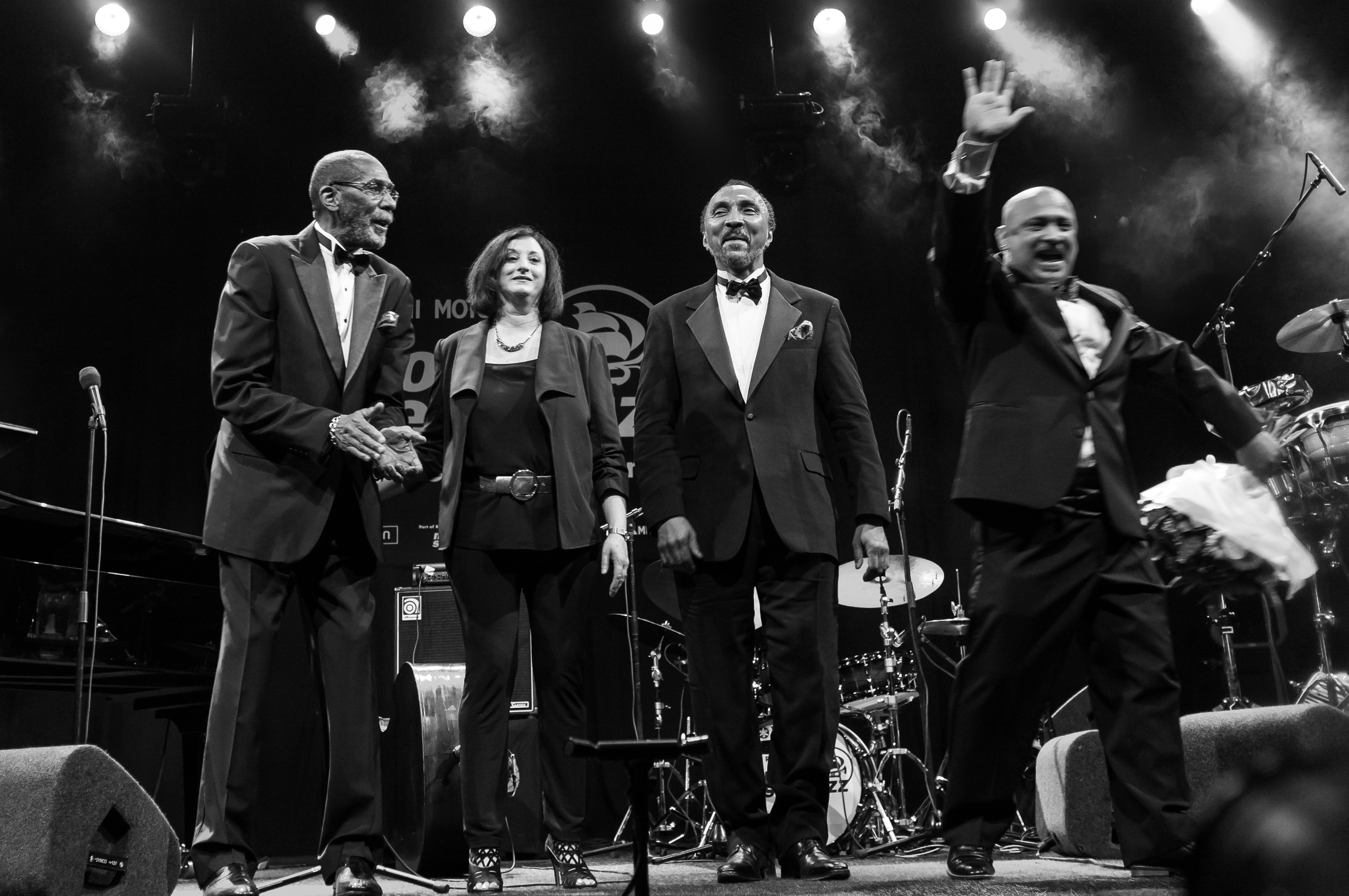
Ron Carter with Foursight at the North Sea Jazz Festival, 2015.

== As leader/co-leader ==
Recording date	Title	Label	Year released	Notes
1961-06	Where?	New Jazz	1961	
1969-10	Uptown Conversation	Embryo	1970	live
1972-08	Alone Together with Jim Hall	Milestone	1973	live
1973-01	Blues Farm	CTI	1973	
1973-10	All Blues	CTI	1974	
1974-11	Spanish Blue	CTI	1975	
1975-06 – 1975-07	Anything Goes	Kudu	1975	
1976-05	Yellow & Green	CTI	1976	
1976-10	Pastels	Milestone	1976	
1977-03	Piccolo	Milestone	1977	live
1977-07	Third Plane	Milestone	1977	
1977-11	Peg Leg	Milestone	1978	
1978-06	A Song for You	Milestone	1978	
1978-07	1 + 3 with Hank Jones or Herbie Hancock and Tony Williams	JVC	1979	live
1978-07	Carnaval with Sadao Watanabe, Hank Jones and Tony Williams	Galaxy	1983	live
1978-12	Pick 'Em	Milestone	1980	
1979-03	Parade	Milestone	1980	
1979-12	New York Slick	Milestone	1980	
1980-05	Patrão	Milestone	1981	
1980	Empire Jazz	RSO	1980	
1980-09	Parfait	Milestone	1982	
1981-04	Super Strings	Milestone	1981	
1981-12	Heart & Soul with Cedar Walton	Timeless	1982	
1982-09	Etudes	Elektra Musician	1983	
1982-11	Live at Village West with Jim Hall	Concord Jazz	1984	live
1984-08	Telephone with Jim Hall	Concord Jazz	1985	live
1986	Plays Bach	Phillips	1987	
1986-05	The Puzzle	SMS	1986	
1987-08	Very Well	Polydor Deep Moat	1987	
1988-03	All Alone	EmArcy	1988	
1989-02	Something in Common with Houston Person	Muse	1990	
1989-09	Duets with Helen Merrill	EmArcy	1989	
1990-01	Now's the Time with Houston Person	Muse	1990	
1990-04	Eight Plus	Victor	1990	
1991-07	Panamanhattan with Richard Galliano	Dreyfus Jazz	1991	live
1991–12	Meets Bach	Blue Note	1992	
1992–12	Friends	Blue Note	1993	
1994-01	Jazz, My Romance	Blue Note	1994	
1995-02	Mr. Bow-tie	Blue Note	1995	
1995-12	Brandenburg Concerto	Blue Note	1996	
1997-01	The Bass and I	Somethin' Else	1997	
1998-01	So What?	Somethin' Else	1998	
1999-02, 1999-03	Orfeu	Somethin' Else	1999	
2000-04	Holiday in Rio	Blue Note	2001	
2000-05	When Skies Are Grey...	Blue Note	2001	live
2000-08	Dialogues with Houston Person	HighNote	2002	
2001-04	Stardust	Blue Note	2001	
2002-07	The Golden Striker	Blue Note	2003	
2005-10	Just Between Friends with Houston Person	HighNote	2008	
2006-02	Dear Miles	Blue Note	2007	
2007-04, 2007-06	It's the Time	Blue Note	2007	
2008-04	Jazz & Bossa	Blue Note	2008	[3CD]
2009-06	The World of Ron Carter	Somethin' Else	2009	
2010-06	Ron Carter's Great Big Band	Sunnyside	2011	
2012-12	Cocktails At The Cotton Club	Somethin' Else	2013	
2014-01	In Memory of Jim with Larry Coryell and Peter Bernstein	Somethin' Else	2014	
2014-07	My Personal Songbook with the WDR Big Band	In+Out	2015	[CD + DVD-Video]
2015–10	The Brown Beatnik Tomes with Danny Simmons	Blue Note	2019	live
2015-12	Chemistry with Houston Person	HighNote	2016	
2016-10	An Evening with Ron Carter & Richard Galliano with Richard Galliano	In+Out	2017	live
2018-03	Remember Love with Houston Person	HighNote	2018	
2018-10	Skyline with Jack DeJohnette, Gonzalo Rubalcaba	5Passion	2021	Grammy won album
2018-11	Foursight: The Complete Stockholm Tapes	In+Out	2022	[2CD] live (combines Volume 1 and Volume 2)
2019-04	Remembering Bob Freedman	Shanti Music	2021	live, Grammy nominated album
2014 – 2021	Finding The Right Notes	In+Out	2022	soundtrack

Collaboration
With Herbie Hancock, Wayne Shorter, Tony Williams and Wallace Roney

- A Tribute to Miles (Qwest/Reprise/Warner Bros., 1994) – rec. 1992, 1994

== As sideman ==
With Pepper Adams

- The Adams Effect (Uptown, 1988)
- Mean What You Say with Thad Jones (Milestone, 1966)
- Encounter! (Prestige, 1969)

With Nat Adderley

- Calling Out Loud (CTI, 1968)
- A Little New York Midtown Music (Galaxy, 1979)

With Geri Allen

- Twenty One (Blue Note, 1994)
- Timeless Portraits and Dreams (Telarc, 2006)

With Gene Ammons

- The Black Cat! (Prestige, 1971) – rec. 1970
- My Way (Prestige, 1971)
- Got My Own (Prestige, 1972)
- Big Bad Jug (Prestige, 1973) – rec. 1972

With Roy Ayers

- Stoned Soul Picnic (Atlantic, 1968)
- Daddy Bug (Atlantic, 1969)

With Chet Baker

- She Was Too Good to Me (CTI, 1974)
- Carnegie Hall Concert with Gerry Mulligan (CTI, 1975) – live
- You Can't Go Home Again (Horizon, 1977)
- Once Upon a Summertime (Artists House, 1980)
- The Best Thing for You (A&M, 1989)

With Gato Barbieri

- Fenix (Flying Dutchman, 1971)
- Chapter Three: Viva Emiliano Zapata (Impulse!, 1974)
- Yesterdays (Flying Dutchman, 1974)
- Chapter Four: Alive in New York (Impulse!, 1975) – live

With Joey Baron

- Down Home with Arthur Blythe and Bill Frisell (Intuition, 1997)
- We'll Soon Find Out with Arthur Blythe and Bill Frisell (Intuition, 1999)

With George Benson

- Giblet Gravy (Verve, 1968)
- Shape of Things to Come (A&M, 1969) – rec. 1968
- The Other Side of Abbey Road (A&M, 1970) – rec. 1969
- Beyond the Blue Horizon (CTI, 1971)
- White Rabbit (CTI, 1972) – rec. 1971
- Body Talk (CTI, 1973)
- Bad Benson (CTI, 1974)
- Tenderly (Warner Bros., 1989)
- Big Boss Band (Warner Bros., 1990)

With Cindy Blackman

- The Oracle (Muse, 1995)
- In the Now (HighNote, 1998)

With Ray Bryant

- Up Above the Rock (Cadet, 1968)
- MCMLXX (Atlantic, 1970)

With Kenny Burrell

- Guitar Forms (Verve, 1964)
- A Generation Ago Today (Verve, 1967)
- Blues – The Common Ground (Verve, 1968)
- Night Song (Verve, 1969)
- God Bless the Child (CTI, 1971)
- Togethering with Grover Washington Jr. (Blue Note, 1984)

With Jaki Byard

- Here's Jaki (New Jazz, 1961)
- Hi-Fly (New Jazz, 1962)
- Out Front! (Prestige, 1964)
- Jaki Byard with Strings! (Prestige, 1968)

With Donald Byrd

- Electric Byrd (Blue Note, 1970)
- Kofi (Blue Note, 1995) – rec. 1969–1970

With Billy Cobham

- Spectrum (Atlantic, 1973)
- The Art of Three (In+Out Records, 2001)
- The Art of Four (In+Out Records, 2006)

With Alice Coltrane

- Huntington Ashram Monastery (Impulse!, 1969)
- Ptah, The El Daoud (Impulse!, 1970)

With Hank Crawford

- Mr. Blues Plays Lady Soul (Atlantic, 1969)
- It's a Funky Thing to Do (Cotillion, 1971)
- Help Me Make it Through the Night (Kudu, 1972)
- We Got a Good Thing Going (Kudu, 1972)

With Miles Davis

- Quiet Nights (Columbia, 1962)
- Seven Steps to Heaven (Columbia, 1963)
- Miles Davis in Europe (Columbia, 1964) – live
- Live at the 1963 Monterey Jazz Festival (Monterey Jazz Festival, 2003) – live
- My Funny Valentine (Columbia, 1965) – live
- Four & More (Columbia, 1966) – live
- Miles in Berlin (Columbia, 1965) – live
- Miles in Tokyo (CBS, 1969) – live
- Live at the Plugged Nickel (Columbia, 1995) – live
- ESP (Columbia, 1965)
- Miles Smiles (Columbia, 1967)
- Sorcerer (Columbia, 1967)
- Nefertiti (Columbia, 1968)
- Miles in the Sky (Columbia, 1968)
- Filles de Kilimanjaro (Columbia, 1969)
- Live-Evil (Columbia, 1971) – partially live
- Big Fun (Columbia, 1974)
- Water Babies (Columbia, 1976)
- Circle in the Round (Columbia, 1979)
- Direction (Columbia, 1981)
- Live in Milan 1964 (RLR, 2007)

With Paul Desmond

- Summertime (CTI, 1968)
- From the Hot Afternoon (CTI, 1969)
- Bridge Over Troubled Water (CTI, 1970)
- Skylark (CTI, 1973)
- Pure Desmond (CTI, 1975)

With Eric Dolphy

- Out There (Prestige, 1961)
- Far Cry (Prestige, 1962)

With Lou Donaldson

- Lush Life (Blue Note, 1980)
- Sophisticated Lou (Blue Note, 1973)

With Don Ellis

- How Time Passes (Candid, 1960)
- New Ideas (New Jazz, 1961)

With Gil Evans

- Out of the Cool (Impulse!, 1961) – rec. 1960
- The Individualism of Gil Evans (Impulse!, 1964)

With Roberta Flack

- First Take (Atlantic, 1969)
- Quiet Fire (Atlantic, 1971)
- Killing Me Softly (Atlantic, 1973)

With Tommy Flanagan

- The Master Trio (Baybridge, 1983)
- Blues in the Closet (Baybridge, 1983)

With Michael Franks

- Tiger in the Rain (Warner Bros. Records, 1979)
- Skin Dive (Warner Bros., 1985)

With Nnenna Freelon

- Nnenna Freelon (Columbia, 1992)
- Listen (Columbia, 1994)

With Letizia Gambi

- Introducing Letizia Gambi (Jando Music S.r.l., 2012)
- Blue Monday (RP Production, 2016)

With Red Garland

- Red Alert (Galaxy, 1978)
- Crossings (Galaxy, 1978)
- Stepping Out (Galaxy, 1981)
- So Long Blues (Galaxy, 1984)
- Strike Up the Band (Galaxy, 1981)

With Stan Getz

- Voices (Verve, 1967)
- Sweet Rain (Verve, 1967)
- What the World Needs Now: Stan Getz Plays Burt Bacharach and Hal David (Verve, 1968) – rec. 1966-1968
- Stan Getz & Bill Evans (Verve, 1973) – rec. 1964

With Gerry Gibbs

- Thrasher Dream Trio with Kenny Barron (Whaling City Sound, 2013)
- We're Back with Kenny Barron (Whaling City Sound, 2014)
- Live in Studio with Kenny Barron (Whaling City Sound, 2015)

With Benny Golson

- Pop + Jazz = Swing (Audio Fidelity, 1961) – also released as Just Jazz!
- Free (Argo, 1962)
- This Is for You, John (Baystate, 1984)
- Stardust (Denon, 1987) with Freddie Hubbard
- One Day, Forever (Arkadia Jazz, 2001) – rec. 1999

With Johnny Griffin

- White Gardenia (Riverside, 1961)
- The Kerry Dancers (Riverside, 1962)

With Jim Hall

- Concierto (CTI, 1975)
- Commitment (A&M, 1976)
- Live at Village West (Concord Jazz, 1984)
- Telephone (Concord Jazz, 1985)

With Johnny Hammond

- Wild Horses Rock Steady (Kudu, 1971)
- The Prophet (Kudu, 1972)
- Higher Ground (Kudu, 1973)

With Herbie Hancock

- Empyrean Isles (Blue Note, 1964)
- Maiden Voyage (Blue Note, 1965)
- Speak Like a Child (Blue Note, 1968)
- V.S.O.P. (Columbia, 1977) – rec. 1976
- Quartet (Columbia, 1982) – rec. 1981

With Eddie Harris

- The In Sound (Atlantic, 1965)
- Mean Greens (Atlantic, 1966)
- The Tender Storm (Atlantic, 1966)
- Plug Me In (Atlantic, 1968)
- Excursions (Atlantic, 1966)
- How Can You Live Like That? (Atlantic, 1976)

With Coleman Hawkins

- Night Hawk (Swingville, 1961) – rec. 1960
- The Hawk Relaxes (Moodsville, 1961)

With Joe Henderson

- Mode for Joe (Blue Note, 1966)
- The Kicker (Milestone, 1968)
- Tetragon (Milestone, 1968)
- Power to the People (Milestone, 1969)
- Black Is the Color (Milestone, 1972)
- Black Miracle (Milestone, 1976)
- Mirror Mirror (MPS, 1980)
- The State of the Tenor, Vols. 1 & 2 (Blue Note, 1985)

With Andrew Hill

- Grass Roots (Blue Note, 1968)
- Lift Every Voice (Blue Note, 1969)
- Passing Ships (Blue Note, 1969)

With Johnny Hodges

- Rippin' & Runnin' (Verve, 1968)
- 3 Shades of Blue (Flying Dutchman, 1970)

With Freddie Hubbard

- Red Clay (CTI, 1970)
- Straight Life (CTI, 1970)
- First Light (CTI, 1971)
- Freddie Hubbard/Stanley Turrentine in Concert Volume One (CTI, 1973)
- In Concert Volume Two (CTI, 1973)
- Sky Dive (CTI, 1973)

With Bobby Hutcherson

- Components (Blue Note, 1965)
- Acoustic Masters II (Atlantic, 1994)

With Milt Jackson

- Big Bags (Riverside, 1962)
- Invitation (Riverside, 1962)
- Milt Jackson at the Museum of Modern Art (Limelight, 1965) – live
- Milt Jackson and the Hip String Quartet (Verve, 1968)
- Sunflower (CTI, 1973) – rec. 1972
- Goodbye (CTI, 1974) – rec. 1972-1973
- Olinga (CTI, 1974)
- Opus De Funk (Prestige, 1975)

With Antonio Carlos Jobim

- Wave (A&M, 1967)
- Tide (A&M, 1970)
- Stone Flower (CTI, 1970)
- Jobim (MCA, 1973)
- Urubu (Warner Bros., 1976)

With J. J. Johnson

- The Total J.J. Johnson (RCA Victor, 1967) – rec. 1966
- Pinnacles (Milestone, 1980) – rec. 1979

With Hank Jones

- Hanky Panky (East Wind, 1975)
- I'm Old Fashioned (East Wind, 1976) with Sadao Watanabe and The Great Jazz Trio
- The Great Jazz Trio at the Village Vanguard (East Wind, 1977) as The Great Jazz Trio
- The Great Jazz Trio at the Village Vanguard Vol. 2 (East Wind, 1977) as The Great Jazz Trio
- The Great Jazz Trio at the Village Vanguard Again (East Wind, 1981) as The Great Jazz Trio – rec. 1977
- Kindness Joy Love & Happiness (East Wind, 1977) as The Great Jazz Trio
- Direct from L.A. (East Wind, 1977) as The Great Jazz Trio
- Milestones (East Wind, 1978) as The Great Jazz Trio
- New Wine in Old Bottles (East Wind, 1978) with Jackie McLean and the Great Jazz Trio

With Ivan "Boogaloo Joe" Jones

- Introducing the Psychedelic Soul Jazz Guitar of Joe Jones (Prestige, 1968) – rec. 1967
- Black Whip (Prestige, 1973)

With Hubert Laws

- Laws' Cause (Atlantic, 1969) – rec. 1968
- Crying Song (CTI, 1969)
- Afro-Classic (CTI, 1970)
- The Rite of Spring (CTI, 1971)
- Wild Flower (Atlantic, 1972) – rec. 1971-1972
- Morning Star (CTI, 1972)
- Carnegie Hall (CTI, 1973) – live
- In the Beginning (CTI, 1974)
- The Chicago Theme (CTI, 1975)

With Harold Mabern

- Straight Street (DIW, 1989)
- The Leading Man (DIW, 1993)

With Herbie Mann

- Glory of Love (CTI, 1968) – rec. 1967
- Concerto Grosso in D Blues (Atlantic, 1969) – rec. 1968
- Stone Flute (Embryo, 1970) – rec. 1968

With Branford Marsalis

- Scenes in the City (Colombia, 1984) - rec. 1983
- Royal Garden Blues (Colombia, 1986)

With Wynton Marsalis

- Wynton Marsalis (Colombia, 1981)
- Hot House Flowers (Colombia, 1984)
- Black Codes (From the Underground) (Colombia, 1985)

With Les McCann

- Much Les (Atlantic, 1969)
- Comment (Atlantic, 1970)

With Helen Merrill

- The Feeling Is Mutual (Millestone, 1967)
- Duets (EmArcy, 1989)

With Jane Monheit

- Never Never Land (N-Coded, 2000)
- In the Sun (N-Coded, 2002)
- Taking a Chance on Love (Sony, 2004)

With Bette Midler

- The Divine Miss M (Atlantic, 1972) – rec. 1971-1972
- Some People's Lives (Atlantic, 1990)
- Bathhouse Betty (Warner Bros., 1998) – rec. 1997-1998

With Buddy Montgomery

- Ties of Love (Landmark, 1987)
- So Why Not? (Landmark, 1988)

With Wes Montgomery

- SO Much Guitar! (Riverside, 1961)
- Maximum Swing: The Unissued 1965 Half Note Recordings (Resonance, 1965)
- Tequila (Verve, 1966)
- A Day in the Life (A&M, 1967)
- Down Here on the Ground (A&M, 1968)

With Frank Morgan

- Yardbird Suite (Contemporary, 1988)
- Reflections (Contemporary, 1989)
- Listen to the Dawn (Antilles, 1994)

With Oliver Nelson

- Sound Pieces (Impulse!, 1967) – rec. 1966
- Happenings (Impulse!, 1966)
- Encyclopedia of Jazz (Verve, 1966)
- The Sound of Feeling (Verve, 1966)

With David "Fathead" Newman

- The Many Facets of David Newman (Atlantic, 1969) – rec. 1968-1969
- Newmanism (Atlantic, 1974)
- Mr. Fathead (Warner Bros., 1976)
- Scratch My Back (Prestige, 1979)
- Mr. Gentle Mr. Cool (Kokopelli, 1994)

With Hermeto Pascoal

- Hermeto (Cobblestone, 1970)
- Slaves Mass (Warner Bros., 1976)

With Art Pepper

- So in Love (Artists House, 1980) – rec. 1979
- New York Album (Galaxy, 1985) – rec. 1979

With Esther Phillips

- Alone Again, Naturally (Kudu, 1972)
- Black-Eyed Blues (Kudu, 1973)
- You've Come a Long Way, Baby (Mercury, 1977)

With The Rascals

- Once Upon a Dream (Atlantic, 1968)
- See (Atlantic, 1969)
- Peaceful World (Columbia, 1971)

With Lou Rawls

- Shades of Blue (Philadelphia, 1981)

With Sam Rivers

- Fuchsia Swing Song (Blue Note, 1964)
- Contours (Blue Note, 1965)

With Wallace Roney

- Intuition (Muse, 1988)
- Crunchin' (Muse, 1993)

With Shirley Scott

- On a Clear Day (Impulse!, 1966)
- Mystical Lady (Cadet, 1971)
- Superstition (Cadet, 1973)

With Don Sebesky

- Giant Box (CTI, 1973)
- The Rape of El Morro (CTI, 1975)

With Woody Shaw

- In the Beginning (Muse, 1983) – rec. 1965
- Blackstone Legacy (Contemporary, 1970)

With Wayne Shorter

- Speak No Evil (Blue Note, 1964)
- The Soothsayer (Blue Note, 1965)
- The All Seeing Eye (Blue Note, 1965)
- Schizophrenia (Blue Note, 1967)
- Moto Grosso Feio (Blue Note, 1970)
- Odyssey of Iska (Blue Note, 1970)

With Horace Silver

- Silver 'n Brass (Blue Note, 1975)
- Silver 'n Wood (Blue Note, 1976)
- Silver 'n Voices (Blue Note, 1976)
- Silver 'n Percussion (Blue Note, 1977)
- Silver 'n Strings Play the Music of the Spheres (Blue Note, 1978)
- The Hardbop Grandpop (Impulse!, 1996)
- A Prescription for the Blues (Impulse!, 1997)

With Jimmy Smith

- Got My Mojo Workin' (Verve, 1966)
- Off the Top (Elektra Musician, 1982)

With James Spaulding

- Gotstabe a Better Way! (Muse, 1990) – rec. 1988
- Brilliant Corners (Muse, 1988)

With Gábor Szabó

- Spellbinder (Impulse!, 1966)
- Mizrab (CTI, 1972)

With Bobby Timmons

- In Person (Riverside, 1961) – live
- Born to Be Blue! (Riverside, 1963)
- The Soul Man! (Prestige, 1966)
- Got to Get It! (Milestone, 1967)

With The Manhattan Transfer

- Jukin' (Capitol, 1971)
- Vocalese (Atlantic, 1985)

With Stanley Turrentine

- Let It Go (Impulse!, 1966)
- Sugar (CTI, 1970)
- The Man with the Sad Face (Fantasy, 1976)
- Nightwings (Fantasy, 1977)
- More Than a Mood (MusicMasters, 1992)
- If I Could (MusicMasters, 1993)

With McCoy Tyner

- The Real McCoy (Blue Note, 1967)
- Expansions (Blue Note, 1970)
- Extensions (Blue Note, 1973) – rec. 1970
- Trident (Milestone, 1975)
- Fly with the Wind (Milestone, 1976)
- Supertrios (Milestone, 1977)
- Passion Dance (Milestone, 1978)
- 13th House (Milestone, 1981) – rec. 1980
- New York Reunion (Chesky, 1991)
- Counterpoints (Milestone, 2004) – rec. 1978

With Cedar Walton

- The All American Trio with Jack DeJohnette (Baystate, 1984)
- Cedar Walton Plays (Delos, 1986)
- Roots (Astor Place, 1997)

With Grover Washington Jr.

- Inner City Blues (Kudu, 1972) – rec. 1971
- All the King's Horses (Kudu, 1972)
- Soul Box (Kudu, 1973)
- Aria (Sony Classical, 2000) – rec. 1999

With Randy Weston

- Uhuru Afrika (Roulette, 1961)
- Blue Moses (CTI, 1972)
- Tanjah (Polydor, 1974)

With Vanessa Williams

- The Sweetest Days (Mercury, 1994)
- Star Bright (Mercury, 1996)

With Kai Winding

- The Incredible Kai Winding Trombones (Impulse!, 1960)
- Penny Lane & Time (Verve, 1967)
- Israel with J. J. Johnson (A&M, 1968)
- Betwixt & Between with J. J. Johnson (A&M, 1969)
- Stonebone with J. J. Johnson (A&M, 1969)

With others

- Toshiko Akiyoshi, Toshiko at Top of the Gate (Nippon Columbia, 1968) – live
- Eric Alexander, Nightlife in Tokyo (Milestone, 2003) – rec. 2002
- Noah Baerman, Patch Kit (CD Baby, 2006) also with Ben Riley
- Kenny Barron, 1+1+1 (BlackHawk, 1986) – rec. 1984
- Gary Bartz, Harlem Bush Music (Milestone, 1997) – rec. 1970–1971
- Eric Bibb, Dear America (Provogue, 2021)
- Terence Blanchard, Magnetic (Blue Note, 2013)
- Teresa Brewer, Softly I Swing (Red Baron, 1992)
- Bob Brookmeyer, Bob Brookmeyer and Friends (Columbia, 1964)
- Henry Butler, The Village (Impulse!, 1987)
- Jonathan Butler, Head to Head (Mercury, 1993)
- Benny Carter, Central City Sketches (MusicMasters, 1987)
- Harry Connick, Jr., Harry Connick Jr. (Columbia, 1987)
- Chick Corea, Inner Space (Atlantic, 1973) – compilation
- A. J. Croce, A. J. Croce (Private Music, 1993)
- Tadd Dameron, The Magic Touch (Riverside, 1962)
- Jesse Davis, First Insight (Concord Jazz, 1998)
- Deodato, Prelude (CTI Records, 1973)
- Eli Degibri, Israeli Song (Anzic, 2010)
- Charles Earland, Kharma (Prestige, 1974)
- Bill Evans, Loose Blues (Milestone, 1982)
- Art Farmer, The Many Faces of Art Farmer (Scepter, 1964)
- Four Tops, Tonight! (Casablanca, 1981)
- Aretha Franklin, Soul '69 (Atlantic, 1969)
- Bill Frisell, Bill Frisell, Ron Carter, Paul Motian (Nonesuch, 2006)
- Johnny Frigo, Live from Studio A in New York City (Chesky, 1988) – live
- Terry Garthwaite, Terry (Arista, 1975)
- Astrud Gilberto, Gilberto with Turrentine with Stanley Turrentine (CTI, 1971)
- Giorgio, Party of the Century (Lettera A, 2010)
- Dexter Gordon, Landslide (Blue Note, 1980) – rec. 1961-1962
- Chico Hamilton, The Further Adventures of El Chico (Impulse!, 1966)
- Barry Harris, Magnificent! (Prestige, 1969)
- Gene Harris, Gene Harris of the Three Sounds (Blue Note, 1972)
- Roy Haynes, Thank You Thank You (Galaxy, 1977)
- John Hicks, Friends Old and New (Novus, 1992)
- Dan Hill, If Dreams Had Wings (Epic Records, 1980)
- Lena Horne, Lena & Michel (RCA, 1975)
- Shirley Horn, I Remember Miles (Verve, 1998)
- Janis Ian, Night Rains (Columbia Records, 1979)
- Ethan Iverson, The Purity of the Turf (Criss Cross Jazz, 2016)
- Jackie and Roy, Time & Love (CTI, 1972)
- Bob James, Touchdown, (Columbia, 1978)
- Billy Joel, The Bridge (Columbia, 1986) – rec. 1985-1986
- Philly Joe Jones, Philly Mignon (Galaxy, 1977)
- Quincy Jones, Gula Matari (CTI, 1970)
- Sam Jones, Down Home (Riverside, 1962)
- Eddie Kendricks, Vintage '78 (Arista, 1978)
- Lee Konitz, Spirits (Milestone, 1971)
- Steve Kuhn and Gary McFarland, The October Suite (Impulse!, 1967) – rec. 1966
- Yusef Lateef, The Three Faces of Yusef Lateef (Riverside, 1960)
- Donal Leace, Donal Leace (Atlantic, 1972)
- Mike LeDonne, Night Song (Savant, 2005)
- Mel Lewis, Mel Lewis and Friends (A&M, 1977)
- Nils Lofgren, Mountains (Cattle Track Road, 2023)
- Johnny Lytle, The Soulful Rebel (Milestone, 1971)
- Junior Mance, Happy Time (Jazzland, 1962)
- Arif Mardin, Journey (Atlantic, 1974) – rec. 1973
- Jon Mark, Songs for a Friend (Columbia, 1975)
- Gene McDaniels, Outlaw (Atlantic, 1970)
- Howard McGhee, Dusty Blue (Bethlehem, 1960)
- Ken McIntyre, Year of the Iron Sheep (United Artists, 1962)
- Charles McPherson, Charles McPherson (Mainstream, 1971)
- Meeco, Amargo Mel (Connector, 2009)
- Moondog, Moondog (Columbia Masterworks, 1969)
- James Moody, The Blues and Other Colors (Milestone, 1969)
- Airto Moreira, Free (CTI, 1972)
- Idris Muhammad, Peace and Rhythm (Prestige, 1971)
- Geoff Muldaur, Is Having a Wonderful Time (Reprise, 1975)
- Mark Murphy, Bridging a Gap (Muse, 1973) – rec. 1972
- Aaron Neville, Nature Boy: The Standards Album (Verve, 2003)
- New York Jazz Quartet, In Concert in Japan (Salvation, 1975)
- Rosa Passos, Entre Amigos (Chesky, 2003)
- Nicholas Payton, Smoke Sessions (Smoke Sessions, 2021)
- Duke Pearson, Sweet Honey Bee (Blue Note, 1966)
- Houston Person, Sweet Buns & Barbeque (Prestige, 1973) – rec. 1972
- Austin Peralta, Maiden Voyage (Eighty-Eight's, 2006) – rec. 2005
- Pony Poindexter, Pony's Express (Epic, 1962)
- Bruce Roberts, Bruce Roberts (Elektra, 1977)
- Tom Rush, Tom Rush (Columbia, 1970)
- Gil Scott-Heron, Pieces of a Man (Flying Dutchman, 1972)
- Bud Shank, This Bud's for You... (Muse, 1985) – rec. 1984
- Marlena Shaw, From the Depths of My Soul (Blue Note, 1973)
- Archie Shepp, The Way Ahead (Impulse!, 1969)
- Janis Siegel, Experiment in White (Atlantic, 1982)
- John Simon, Out on the Street (Pioneer, 1992)
- Paul Simon, Paul Simon (Columbia, 1972)
- Grace Slick, Manhole (RCA, 1974) – rec. 1973
- Lonnie Smith, Mama Wailer (Kudu, 1971)
- Phoebe Snow, Second Childhood (Columbia, 1976)
- Candi Staton, Candi Staton (Warner Bros., 1980)
- Sonny Stitt, Satan (Cadet, 1974)
- Ed Summerlin, Ring Out Joy (Avant-Garde, 1968)
- Kate Taylor, Kate Taylor (Columbia, 1978)
- Buddy Terry, Electric Soul! (Prestige, 1967)
- Ed Thigpen, Out of the Storm (Verve, 1966)
- Charles Tolliver, Paper Man (Freedom, 1968)
- A Tribe Called Quest, The Low End Theory (Jive, 1991) – rec. 1990-1991
- The Tymes, Diggin' Their Roots (RCA Victor, 1977)
- Kenny Vance, Vance 32 (Atlantic, 1975)
- Mal Waldron, The Quest (New Jazz, 1962) – rec. 1961
- The Tony Williams Lifetime, Ego (Polydor, 1971)
- Leo Wright, Suddenly the Blues (Atlantic, 1962)
