= All Alone =

All Alone may refer to:

== Film and television ==
- All Alone (2013 film), a 2013 Iranian film
- All Alone (film series), a 2006–2008 series of pornographic films
- "All Alone" (The Marvelous Mrs. Maisel), a television episode
- "All Alone" (Six Feet Under), a television episode

=== Albums ===
- All Alone (André Previn album), 1967
- All Alone (Dolo Coker album) or the title song, 1981
- All Alone (Frank Sinatra album), 1962
- All Alone (Jo Stafford album), 1963
- All Alone (Ron Carter album), 1988
- All Alone, an EP by the Sins of Thy Beloved, 1997

=== Songs ===
- "All Alone" (Irving Berlin song), a 1924 composition; recorded by many artists, including Frank Sinatra
- "All Alone", composed by Harry Von Tilzer
- "All Alone", instrumental version of "Left Alone" by Joe Satriani
- "All Alone", by 1 Giant Leap from 1 Giant Leap, 2002
- "All Alone", by the Beach Boys from Endless Harmony Soundtrack, 1998
- "All Alone", by Blind Witness from Nightmare on Providence Street, 2010
- "All Alone", by Chris Richardson, 2008
- "All Alone", by the Clientele from Music for the Age of Miracles, 2017
- "All Alone", by Fun from Some Nights, 2012
- "All Alone", by Gorillaz from Demon Days, 2005
- "All Alone", by Grabbitz and Pegboard Nerds, 2016
- "All Alone", by Jackson Jackson, 2008
- "All Alone", by Kim Jae-joong from I, 2013
- "All Alone", by Kutless from Sea of Faces, 2004
- "All Alone", by Mad Season from Above, 1995
- "All Alone", by T. Rex from Futuristic Dragon, 1976

== Other uses ==
- All Alone (novel), a 1953 children's novel by Claire Huchet Bishop
- All Alone (pigeon), a war pigeon decorated for bravery in 1946
