= Stephen Scott (jazz pianist) =

American jazz pianist (born 1969)

- Born: March 13, 1969 (age 57); Queens, New York, U.S.
- Genres: Jazz
- Occupation: Musician
- Instrument: Piano
- Years active: mid-1980s–2008
- Labels: Verve; Enja

Stephen Scott (born March 13, 1969) is an American jazz pianist.

Scott played piano from the age of five. While attending New York's High School of the Performing Arts, he was introduced to jazz by alto saxophonist Justin Robinson, in particular, the music of Wynton Kelly and Red Garland. Later, he took private lessons at the Juilliard School of Music.

In 1986, he received the Young Talent Award from the National Association of Jazz Educators, and within the year, was hired as accompanist to singer Betty Carter. Scott was soon playing with bands led by Kenny Barron, Terence Blanchard, Ron Carter, Lou Donaldson, Benny Golson, Craig Handy, Roy Hargrove, the Harper Brothers, Joe Henderson (appearing on the Grammy-winning tribute to Billy Strayhorn, Lush Life), Jon Hendricks, Bobby Hutcherson, Victor Lewis (appearing on Eeeyyess!), Branford Marsalis, Wynton Marsalis, Sonny Rollins, and Bobby Watson.

== Discography ==
=== As leader ===
- Something to Consider (Verve, 1991)
- Aminah's Dream (Verve, 1993)
- Renaissance (Verve, 1994)
- Beautiful Thing (Verve, 1996)
- Vision Quest (Enja, 1999)

Collaboration
With Roy Hargrove and Christian McBride

- Parker's Mood (Verve, 1995)

=== As sideman ===
With Ron Carter

- Eight Plus (Victor (Japan), 1990)
- The Bass and I (Somethin' Else, 1997)
- Orfeu (Somethin' Else, 1999)
- When Skies Are Grey... (Somethin' Else, 2001)
- Dear Miles (Somethin' Else, 2007)
- Jazz & Bossa (Blue Note, 2008)

With Sonny Rollins

- Sonny Rollins + 3 (Milestone, 1996) – rec. 1995
- Global Warming (Milestone, 1998)
- This Is What I Do (Milestone, 2000)
- Without a Song: The 9/11 Concert (Milestone, 2005) – live rec. 2001

With others

- Betty Carter, Look What I Got! (Verve, 1988)
- Ray Drummond, 1-2-3-4 (Arabesque, 1999)
- Frank Foster, Leo Rising (Arabesque, 1997)
- Roy Hargrove, Public Eye (Novus/RCA, 1991)
- Joe Henderson, Lush Life: The Music of Billy Strayhorn (Verve, 1991)
- Freddie Hubbard, MMTC: Monk, Miles, Trane & Cannon (Music Master, 1995)
- Justin Robinson, Justin Time (Verve, 1991)
