= Tenderly (George Benson album) =

Studio album by George Benson
- Released: 1989
- Genre: Pop; jazz pop
- Length: 38:31
- Label: Warner Bros
- Producer: Tommy LiPuma

George Benson chronology
Twice the Love (1988)	Tenderly (1989)	Big Boss Band (1990)

Singles from Tenderly
- 1. "Here, There & Everywhere" Released: 1993

Tenderly is a 1989 studio album by George Benson, produced by long time collaborator Tommy LiPuma.

== Reception ==
Professional ratings
Review scores
Source	Rating
AllMusic	4.5/5 stars
The Penguin Guide to Jazz Recordings	2/4 stars

In a review for AllMusic, Richard S. Ginell wrote that Benson has gotten the message by "giving up the fruitless search for decent contemporary material, he switched gears and recorded an album of old standards with top-grade jazz musicians".

== Track listing ==
No.	Title	Writer(s)	Length
1.	"You Don't Know What Love Is"	Don Raye, Gene de Paul	4:39
2.	"Stella by Starlight"	Ned Washington, Victor Young	5:13
3.	"Stardust"	Hoagy Carmichael, Mitchell Parish	6:02
4.	"At the Mambo Inn"	Frederick Lincoln-Guirty, Bobby Woodlen, Grace Sampson, Mario Bauzá	4:53
5.	"Here, There and Everywhere"	John Lennon, Paul McCartney	5:04
6.	"This Is All I Ask"	Gordon Jenkins	5:35
7.	"Tenderly"	Jack Lawrence, Walter Gross	3:05
8.	"I Could Write a Book"	Richard Rodgers, Lorenz Hart	4:00

== Personnel ==
=== Musicians ===
- George Benson – guitar (1–5, 7, 8), vocals (1, 3–6, 8)
- McCoy Tyner – acoustic piano (1–6, 8)
- Ron Carter – upright bass (1–6, 8)
- Louis Hayes – drums (1, 6)
- Herlin Riley – drums (2–5)
- Al Foster – drums (8)
- Lenny Castro – percussion (4, 5)
- Marty Paich – horn and string arrangements

=== Production ===
- Tommy LiPuma – producer
- Elliot Scheiner – recording
- Bill Schnee – mixing, additional recording
- Steve Rinkoff – additional recording
- Al Schmitt – additional recording
- Peter Darmi – assistant engineer
- Troy Halderson – assistant engineer
- Roy Hendrickson – assistant engineer
- Joe Pirrera – assistant engineer
- Jim Shefler – assistant engineer
- Bart Stevens – assistant engineer
- Russ DeFilippis – technical assistant
- Doug Sax – mastering at The Mastering Lab (Hollywood, California)
- Lu Snead – project administrator
- Rosemarie Kraitz – production assistant
- Angel Rangelov – production assistant
- Pamela Byers – album package coordinator
- Ph. D – art direction, design
- Harris Savides – photography
- Ken Fritz Management – direction

== Charts ==
Chart (1989)	Peak position
US Billboard 200	140
US Jazz Albums	1
