= Sonny Rollins + 3 =

1996 studio album by Sonny Rollins

Studio album by Sonny Rollins
- Released: 1996
- Recorded: August 30 & October 7, 1995
- Genre: Jazz
- Length: 55:42
- Label: Milestone
- Producer: Sonny Rollins

Sonny Rollins chronology
Old Flames (1993)	Sonny Rollins + 3 (1996)	Global Warming (1998)

Sonny Rollins + 3 is a studio album by jazz saxophonist Sonny Rollins, released on the Milestone label in 1995, featuring performances by Rollins with Bob Cranshaw, Stephen Scott, Jack DeJohnette, Tommy Flanagan and Al Foster.

== Reception ==
Professional ratings
Review scores
Source	Rating
AllMusic	4.5/5 stars
The Penguin Guide to Jazz Recordings	3/4 stars

The AllMusic review by Scott Yanow states: "Rollins is in wonderful form, stretching out on two basic originals and five standards.... This studio set captures the excitement of a Sonny Rollins concert and is highly recommended."

== Track listing ==
All compositions by Sonny Rollins except as indicated

1. "What a Difference a Day Made" (Stanley Adams, María Mendez Grever) - 10:05
2. "Biji" - 8:18
3. "They Say It's Wonderful" (Irving Berlin) - 6:15
4. "Mona Lisa" (Ray Evans, Jay Livingston) - 3:53
5. "Cabin in the Sky" (Vernon Duke, John Latouche) - 8:50
6. "H.S." - 6:17
7. "I've Never Been in Love Before" (Frank Loesser) - 12:19

- Recorded in New York City on August 30 (tracks 3 & 5) and October 7 (tracks 1, 2, 4, 6 & 7), 1995

== Personnel ==
- Sonny Rollins - tenor saxophone
- Bob Cranshaw - electric bass
- Stephen Scott - piano (tracks 3 & 5)
- Jack DeJohnette - drums (tracks 3 & 5)
- Tommy Flanagan - piano (tracks 1, 2, 4, 6 & 7)
- Al Foster - drums (tracks 1, 2, 4, 6 & 7)
