= The Party (Houston Person album) =

Studio album by Houston Person
- Released: 1991
- Recorded: November 14, 1989
- Studio: Van Gelder Studio, Englewood Cliffs, NJ
- Genre: Jazz
- Length: 53:18
- Label: Muse; MCD 5451

Houston Person chronology
Something in Common (1989)	The Party (1991)	Now's the Time (1990)

The Party is an album by saxophonist Houston Person recorded in 1989 and released on the Muse label.

== Reception ==
Professional ratings
Review scores
Source	Rating
AllMusic	4.5/5 stars

The AllMusic review by Ron Wynn called it a "Good soul jazz and blues session".

== Track listing ==
1. "Love Me Tender" (Elvis Presley, Vera Matson) – 9:59
2. "Blue Velvet" (Bernie Wayne, Lee Morris) – 6:06
3. "Blues for H.P." (Randy Johnston) – 7:17
4. "Ceora" (Lee Morgan) – 5:32
5. "Impossible" (Steve Allen) – 6:00
6. "The Party's Over" (Jule Styne, Betty Comden, Adolph Green) – 8:26
7. "True Blues" (Joey DeFrancesco, Houston Person) – 9:58

== Personnel ==
- Houston Person – tenor saxophone
- Joey DeFrancesco – organ
- Randy Johnston – guitar
- Bertell Knox – drums
- Sammy Figueroa – congas, percussion
