= This Is What I Do (Sonny Rollins album) =

2000 studio album by Sonny Rollins

Studio album by Sonny Rollins
- Released: 2000
- Recorded: May 8–9 & July 29, 2000
- Studio: Clinton Recording Studio, New York City
- Genre: Jazz, hard bop, straight-ahead jazz
- Length: 48:19
- Label: Milestone
- Producer: Sonny Rollins, Lucille Rollins

Sonny Rollins chronology
Global Warming (1998)	This Is What I Do (2000)	Without a Song: The 9/11 Concert (2002)

This Is What I Do is a studio album by jazz saxophonist Sonny Rollins, released in 2000 on Milestone Records.

== Background ==
This album features Rollins performing with the likes of Clifton Anderson, Stephen Scott, Bob Cranshaw, Jack DeJohnette and Perry Wilson.

== Critical reception ==
Professional ratings
Review scores
Source	Rating
AllMusic	4/5 stars
The Penguin Guide to Jazz Recordings	4/4 stars
Dallas Morning News	(B+)
The Times	3/5 stars

Thor Christensen of The Dallas Morning News, in a B+ review commented: "But while What I Do blazes no new trails, it's still a challenging work full of the mind-bending solos and striking melodies that have always marked Mr. Rollins' best work." Alex Henderson of AllMusic, in a 4/5-star review declared: "This Is What I Do falls short of essential, but it offers some nice surprises and is a rewarding addition to Rollins' huge catalog." Clive Davis of The Times, in a 4/5 star review proclaimed, "After a string of so-so releases, the good news is that his latest contains some of his earthiest playing in years. We all know that he can hurtle through the chord changes faster than a speeding bullet, but it is good to be reminded of just how soulful a musician he can be. There are times when he sounds as raw and bluesy as the recently departed Stanley Turrentine.

Gary Giddins would later state in 2002: "I think Sonny’s work of the last 20–25 years contains many of his greatest performances. As a recording artist, there was greater consistency in the '50s and in the '60s than later. But as a player, he has kept growing — his sound is so much more powerful and interesting now. And he’s made many great records...the new album, This Is What I Do, is tremendous." The Penguin Guide to Jazz in 4/4 star review remarked: "This Is What I Do is unmistakable, and great Sonny Rollins."

== Accolades ==
The album also won a Grammy Award for Best Jazz Instrumental Album.

== Track listing ==
All compositions by Sonny Rollins except where noted.

1. "Salvador" – 7:55
2. "Sweet Leilani" (Harry Owens) – 7:01
3. "Did You See Harold Vick?" – 9:19
4. "A Nightingale Sang in Berkeley Square" (Eric Maschwitz, Manning Sherwin) – 8:06
5. "Charles M." – 10:19
6. "Moon of Manakoora" (Frank Loesser, Alfred Newman) – 5:44
- Recorded at Clinton Recording Studios, New York City, on May 8 & 9, 2000, except tracks 3 & 5, recorded on July 29.

== Personnel ==
=== Musicians ===
- Sonny Rollins – tenor saxophone
- Clifton Anderson – trombone (except tracks 1 & 6)
- Stephen Scott – piano
- Bob Cranshaw – electric bass
- Jack DeJohnette – drums (except tracks 3 & 5)
- Perry Wilson – drums (tracks 3 & 5)

=== Production ===
- Troy Halderson – recording engineering
- Mark Fraunfelder – recording assistance
- Jeremy Welsh – recording assistance
- Richard Corsello – remixing engineering
- George Horn – mastering
- Jamie Putnam – art direction, design
- John Abbott – photography (including cover)
- Steve Maruta – photography
