= Twice the Love =

Studio album by George Benson
- Released: 28 June 1988
- Genres: Pop; jazz pop
- Length: 49:56
- Label: Warner Bros.
- Producers: George Benson; Preston Glass; Jay Graydon; Dennis Lambert; David Lewis; Wayne Lewis; Barry Eastmond; Wayne Brathwaite; Tommy LiPuma

George Benson chronology
Collaboration (1987)	Twice the Love (1988)	Tenderly (1989)

Singles from Twice the Love
- 1. "Twice The Love" Released: 1988; 2. "Good Habit" Released: 1988; 3. "Let's Do It Again" Released: 1988

Twice the Love is a 1988 studio album by American guitarist and singer George Benson that was recorded with six production teams. The two main singles off the record were the title track "Twice the Love" and the Curtis Mayfield song "Let's Do It Again" which was a No. 1 hit for The Staple Singers in 1975.

== Reception ==
Professional ratings
Review scores
Source	Rating
AllMusic	1.5/5 stars

Like some of Benson's other pop albums, Twice the Love was criticized for the lack of his guitar playing and creative jazz influence, generally labeled as an "attempt to chase the charts".

== Track listing ==
No.	Title	Writer(s)	Producer(s)	Length
1.	"Twice The Love"	Preston Glass, Alan Glass, C.A. Nolen	Preston Glass	4:30
2.	"Starting All Over"	Bill Champlin, Dennis Matkosky, Jason Scheff	Jay Graydon	4:27
3.	"Good Habit"	Franne Golde, Dave Lambert	Dennis Lambert	5:43
4.	"Everybody Does It"	Alan Gorrie, Pam Reswick, Steve Werfel	Dennis Lambert	4:29
5.	"Living On Borrowed Love"	Jeff Pescetto, Allan Rich	George Benson, David Lewis, Wayne Lewis, Jonathan Lewis	3:54
6.	"Let's Do It Again"	Curtis Mayfield	David Lewis, Wayne Lewis, Jonathan Lewis	4:53
7.	"Stephanie"	Wayne Brathwaite, Barry Eastmond, J. Scott Skinner	Wayne Brathwaite, Barry Eastmond	3:46
8.	"Tender Love"	Jerry Butler, J. Scott Skinner	Wayne Brathwaite, Barry Eastmond	4:21
9.	"You're Still My Baby"	Marcus Miller	Tommy LiPuma	5:40
10.	"Until You Believe"	Jerry Butler, Barry Eastmond, J. Scott Skinner	Wayne Brathwaite, Barry Eastmond	4:08
11.	"Let Go (Note: "Let Go" is only available on CD and Austrian LP editions)"	Cinda Firestone, Stephen Fox	George Benson	3:34

== Personnel ==
Musicians:

- George Benson – lead vocals (1, 5), guitar (1, 3–6, 9, 11), vocals (2–4, 6, 7, 10), lead guitar (8)
- Preston Glass – keyboards (1), bass sequencing (1), drum programming (1)
- Jay Graydon – synthesizers (2), drums (2)
- Randy Kerber – synthesizers (2)
- Claude Gaudette – keyboards (3, 4)
- Wayne Lewis – keyboards (5, 6), drum programming (6)
- Rich Aronson – additional keyboards (5), synthesizer sweetening (6), musical programming (6)
- Kevin Deane – additional keyboards (5)
- Jonathan Lewis – additional programming (5), musical programming (6)
- Barry Eastmond – keyboards (7, 8, 10)
- Eric Rehl – synthesizers (7, 8, 10)
- Jason Miles – synthesizer programming (9)
- David Garfield – keyboards (11)
- Bob Baldwin – synthesizer programming (11), drum programming (11)
- Stephen Fox – synthesizer programming (11), drum programming (11)
- Michael Urbaniak – synthesizer programming (11), drum programming (11)
- Dean Parks – guitars (2)
- Paul Jackson, Jr. – guitars (3, 4), additional guitars (5)
- Andy Bloch – guitars (6)
- Ira Siegel – guitars (7, 8, 10)
- Abraham Laboriel – bass (2)
- Neil Stubenhaus – bass (3, 4)
- Marcus Miller – bass (6), all other instruments than guitar (9)
- Wayne Brathwaite – bass (7, 8, 10), drum machine programming (8)
- Bill Champlin – drums (2), backing vocals (2)
- Dennis Matkosky – drums (2)
- Mike Baird – drums (3, 4)
- David Lewis – drum programming (5, 6), additional keyboards (6), additional guitars (6), synthesizer bass (6)
- Terry Silverlight – drums (7, 10)
- Lenny Castro – percussion (3, 4)
- Bashiri Johnson – percussion (7, 8, 10)
- Richard Henrickson – string concertmaster (7, 8)
- Frankie Blue – backing vocals (1)
- Alex Brown – backing vocals (1)
- Cliff Dawson – backing vocals (1)
- Angel Rogers – backing vocals (1)
- Jason Scheff – backing vocals (2)
- Siedah Garrett – backing vocals (3, 4)
- Franne Golde – backing vocals (3)
- Niki Haris – backing vocals (3, 4)
- Dennis Lambert – backing vocals (3)
- Phil Perry – backing vocals (3, 4)
- Yolanda Lee – backing vocals (5)
- Cindy Mizelle – backing vocals (5)
- Vaneese Thomas – backing vocals (5–8, 10)
- Genobia Jeter – backing vocals (6)
- Audrey Wheeler – backing vocals (6)
- Phillip Ballou – backing vocals (7, 10)
- Ethel Beatty – backing vocals (7, 8, 10)
- Thomas Flammia – backing vocals (7, 10)
- Curtis King – backing vocals (7)
- Diane Garisto – backing vocals (8)

Music arrangements

- Preston Glass – arrangements (1)
- Bobby Caldwell – arrangements (2)
- Bill Champlin – arrangements (2)
- Jay Graydon – arrangements (2)
- Randy Kerber – arrangements (2)
- Abraham Laboriel – arrangements (2)
- Dennis Matkosky – arrangements (2)
- Dean Parks – arrangements (2)
- Claude Gaudette – arrangements (3, 4)
- Gene Page – synthesizer sweetening arrangements (6)
- Wayne Brathwaite – rhythm track arrangements (7, 8, 10)
- Barry Eastmond – rhythm track arrangements (7, 8, 10), string arrangements and conductor (7, 8, 10)
- Bob Baldwin – arrangements (11)
- Stephen Fox – arrangements (11)
- Michael Urbaniak – arrangements (11)

== Production ==
- George Benson – executive producer
- Valerie Hobel – production assistant (2)
- Marrianne Pellicci – production coordinator (3, 4)
- Lu Snead – project administrator
- Pamela Byers – album package coordinator
- Mary Ann Dibs – art direction, design
- Robert Hakalski – photography
- Terry Robertson – illustration
- Ken Fritz Management, LA – direction

Technical credits:

- Doug Sax – mastering at The Mastering Lab (Hollywood, California)
- Tommy LiPuma – album sequencing
- Maureen Droney – engineer (1), mixing (1)
- Jay Graydon – engineer (2), mixing (2)
- Mick Guzauski – mixing (2)
- David Bianco – recording (3, 4), mixing (3, 4)
- Bino Espinoza – recording (3, 4)
- Jim Boyer – engineer (5, 9, 11) mixing (9, 11)
- Earl Cohen – mixing (5, 6), engineer (6)
- Carl Beatty – engineer (7, 8, 10), mixing (7, 8, 10)
- Erik Zobler – additional engineer (5)
- Les Cooper – assistant engineer (1)
- Mark Cretella – assistant engineer (1, 3–11)
- Jeff Lorenzen – assistant engineer (1)
- Mitch Zelezny – assistant engineer (1)
- Jamie Chaleff – assistant engineer (3, 4)
- Jeff Poe – assistant engineer (3, 4)
- Tim Leitner – assistant engineer (5, 9, 11)
- Iris Cohen – assistant engineer (6–8, 10)
- Mike Russo – assistant engineer (6)
- John Wise – assistant engineer (6)
- Fernando Kral – assistant engineer (7, 8, 10)
- George Pappadapoulous – assistant engineer (7, 8, 10)
- Mark Pattis – assistant engineer (7, 8, 10)
- Bruce Robbins – technical assistant (7, 8, 10)

== Charts ==
Album charts (weekly)
Chart (1988)	Peak position
Dutch Album Top 100	12
German Top 100 Albums	35
Swiss Albums Top 100	29
UK Albums Chart	16
US Billboard 200	76
US R&B Albums	17
US Top Contemporary Jazz Albums	10

Song charts
Year	Title	Chart peak positions		
Year	Title	Hot R&B/Hip-Hop Singles & Tracks	Dance Music/Club Play Singles	UK
1988	"Twice the Love"	23	-	91
1988	"Let's Do It Again"	8	-	56
1988	"Good Habit"	-	-	-
1989	"Twice the Love"	-	32	-

== Certifications ==
Region	Certification	Certified units/sales
United Kingdom (BPI)	Silver	60,000^{^}
^{^} Shipments figures based on certification alone.
