= It's the Time =

Studio album by Ron Carter
- Released: December 15, 2007
- Recorded: April 27 and June 15, 2007
- Studio: EMI Music Japan Inc. Studios, Tokyo, Japan and
- Genre: Jazz
- Length: 53:15
- Label: Somethin' Else; TOCJ-68075
- Producer: Ron Carter for Retrac Productions

Ron Carter chronology
Dear Miles (2006)	It's the Time (2007)	Jazz & Bossa (2008)

It's the Time is an album by bassist Ron Carter recorded in 2007 and originally released on the Japanese Somethin' Else label.

== Reception ==
The AllMusic review by Ian Martin said "With the appearance of the title track as well as Carter himself in a coffee commercial, there was a resurgence in his popularity in Japan, with this album of new recordings the result".

== Track listing ==
All compositions by Ron Carter except where noted

1. "It's the Time" − 2:53
2. "Eddie's Theme" − 4:56
3. "Mack the Knife" (Kurt Weill, Bertolt Brecht) − 5:44
4. "Candle Light" − 5:19
5. "Softly, as in a Morning Sunrise" (Sigmund Romberg, Oscar Hammerstein II) − 5:37
6. "I Can't Get Started" (Vernon Duke, Ira Gershwin) − 8:20
7. "Super Strings" − 4:54
8. "My Ship" (Weill, Gershwin) − 7:53
9. "Laverne Walk" (Oscar Pettiford) − 6:06
10. "It's the Time" [TVCM Version] − 2:20

== Personnel ==
- Ron Carter – bass, piccolo bass
- Mitsuaki Kishi (track 1), Mulgrew Miller (tracks 1–9) − piano
- Russell Malone − guitar (tracks 1–9)
- Makoto Rikitake − drums (track 10)
- Motoya Hamaguchi − percussion (track 10)
