= Big Boss Band =

Studio album by George Benson
- Released: 1990
- Studio: Clinton Recording Studio and The Power Station (New York City, New York); CTS Studios Ltd. (Wembley, England) (track 7)
- Genre: Jazz
- Length: 41:48
- Label: Warner Bros.
- Producer: George Benson for Broadway Productions; Al Schmitt (co-producer on track 7)

George Benson chronology
Tenderly (1989)	Big Boss Band (1990)	Love Remembers (1993)

Singles from Big Boss Band
- 1. "Baby Workout" Released: 1990

Big Boss Band is the 1990 studio album of American musician George Benson on Warner Bros. featuring the Count Basie Orchestra. This is Benson's second consecutive album which returns to his jazz roots after his successful pop career in the 1980s, and also his debut as sole producer of an album. The genre is mainly big band swing with some Michel Legrand and R&B thrown in.

== Concept ==
In his liner notes, Benson writes that in 1983 he made a promise to Count Basie "to do his (Basie's) music justice" on an album such as Big Boss Band. He continues: "The spirit of the Basie Legacy permeated these sessions as I approached each one (song) in the way I believed the Count would have wanted." He thanks to Frank Foster III for his contribution and notes that he "was Basie's only choice" to arrange this album.

== Reception ==
Professional ratings
Review scores
Source	Rating
AllMusic	4/5 stars
The Penguin Guide to Jazz Recordings	2/4 stars

The album was criticized by jazz writers for not being jazzy enough, for the vocal performance and for not being able to grab the opportunity of making a jazz classic.

== Awards ==
Frank Foster received Grammy Award for his arrangement of George Benson's composition "Basie's Bag" (Best Jazz Instrumental Performance, Big Band, 1990).

== Track listing ==
No.	Title	Writer(s)	Length
1.	"Without a Song"	Vincent Youmans, Edward Eliscu, William Rose	4:09
2.	"Ready Now That You Are"	Frank Foster	5:50
3.	"How Do You Keep the Music Playing?"	Alan Bergman, Marilyn Bergman, Michel Legrand	5:00
4.	"On Green Dolphin Street"	Bronislau Kaper, Ned Washington	4:09
5.	"Baby Workout"	Jackie Wilson, Alonzo Tucker	3:52
6.	"I Only Have Eyes for You"	Harry Warren, Al Dubin	2:52
7.	"Portrait of Jennie"	J. Russel Robinson, Gordon Budge	4:23
8.	"Walkin' My Baby Back Home"	Fred Ahlert, Roy Turk	3:01
9.	"Skylark"	Johnny Mercer, Hoagy Carmichael	5:06
10.	"Basie's Bag"	George Benson	2:59

== Personnel ==
Musicians:

- George Benson – guitar, vocals (1, 3–9)

Count Basie Orchestra (1–4, 6, 8–10):

- Carl "Ace" Carter – acoustic piano
- Charlton Johnson – guitar
- Cleveland Eaton – bass
- Duffy Jackson – drums
- David Glasser – alto saxophone, alto sax solo (2)
- Danny Turner – alto saxophone
- Johnny Williams – baritone saxophone
- Frank Foster III – arrangements (1–5, 8–10), tenor saxophone, tenor sax solo (2)
- Kenneth Hing – tenor saxophone
- Doug Miller – tenor saxophone
- Clarence Banks – trombone
- Melvin Wanzo – trombone
- Tim Williams – trombone
- Bill Hughes – bass trombone
- George Cohn – trumpet
- Bob Ojeda – trumpet, backup trumpet solo (2), arrangements (6)
- Byron Stripling – trumpet, backup trumpet solo (4)
- Mike Williams – trumpet

Additional Musicians:

- Barry J. Eastmond – acoustic piano (3), keyboards (3)
- Terry Burrus – keyboards (5)
- Richard Tee – keyboard bass (5)
- David Witham – keyboards (5)
- Ron Carter – bass (3)
- Bashiri Johnson – percussion (5)
- Ralph MacDonald – percussion (5)
- Carmen Bradford – vocals (3)

New York Horns (5):

- Larry Farrell – trombone
- Paul Faulise – trombone
- Keith O'Quinn – trombone
- James Pugh – trombone
- Randy Brecker – trumpet
- Jon Faddis – trumpet
- Earl Gardner – trumpet
- Lew Soloff – trumpet

Robert Farnon Orchestra (7):

- Robert Farnon – arrangements
- uncredited UK musicians

Production:

- George Benson – producer, liner notes
- Al Schmitt – co-producer (Track 7), recording, mixing
- Peter Darmi – recording
- Elliot Scheiner – recording
- Dave Russell – additional recording
- Jeff Toone – additional recording
- Ed Rak – mixing
- Greg Calbi – mastering at Sterling Sound (New York, NY)
- Russ Defilippis – production assistant for Broadway Productions
- Emile Charlap – musical contractor
- Aaron Woodward – musical contractor
- Lucrecia Snead – project administrator
- Michon C. Stanco – album package coordinator
- Mary Ann Dibs – art direction
- Lorna Stovall – design
- Robert Hakalski – photography
- Robin Lynch – grooming
- Alexander White – styling
- Ken Fritz Management, L.A. – direction

== Charts ==
Chart (1990)	Peak position
Australian Albums (ARIA)	150
US Top Contemporary Jazz Albums	3
