= New Ideas (album) =

Studio album by Don Ellis
- Released: 1961
- Recorded: May 11, 1961
- Studio: Van Gelder Studio, Englewood Cliffs, New Jersey
- Genre: Jazz
- Length: 44:44
- Label: New Jazz; NJLP 8257
- Producer: Esmond Edwards

Don Ellis chronology
Out of Nowhere (1960)	New Ideas (1961)	Essence (1962)

New Ideas is an album by trumpeter Don Ellis recorded in 1961 and released on the New Jazz label.

== Reception ==
Professional ratings
Review scores
Source	Rating
Allmusic	4/5 stars
Down Beat	5/5 stars
The Penguin Guide to Jazz	3/4 stars
The Rolling Stone Jazz Record Guide	3/5 stars

Down Beat magazine critic Pete Welding said in his five star review of February 15, 1962: "This collection I find brilliant in every respect. Ellis' compelling music warrants complete attention if only for the freshness, ingenuity, and striking originality of its conception."

The Allmusic site awarded the album 4 stars stating "Don Ellis experiments with time, new chord structures, and free improvisation... Even over 40 years later, his thoughtful musical experiments of the early '60s are often quite fascinating to hear".

The Penguin Guide to Jazz said "Challenging, provocative music sympathetically recorded by Rudy Van Gelder. The band is on the case from start to finish, with a particular word of praise for Francis, who has a demanding role".

== Track listing ==
All compositions by Don Ellis

1. "Natural H." - 4:33
2. "Despair to Hope" - 4:19
3. "Uh-Huh" - 8:15
4. "Four and Three" - 5:05
5. "Imitation" - 7:57
6. "Solo" - 2:17
7. "Cock and Bull" - 7:06
8. "Tragedy" - 5:12

== Personnel ==
- Don Ellis - trumpet, piano (8)
- Al Francis - vibraphone (tracks 1–5, 7 & 8)
- Jaki Byard - piano (tracks 1, 3, 5, & 7)
- Ron Carter - bass (tracks 1, 3–5, 7 & 8)
- Charlie Persip - drums (tracks 1, 3, 5, 7 & 8)
