= Duets (Helen Merrill and Ron Carter album) =

Studio album by Helen Merrill and Ron Carter
- Released: 1989
- Recorded: December 1988
- Studio: Van Gelder Studio, Englewood Cliffs, NJ
- Genre: Jazz
- Length: 49:13
- Label: EmArcy; 838 097 2
- Producer: Ron Carter

Helen Merrill chronology
Just Friends (1989)	Duets (1989)	Clear Out of This World (1992)

Ron Carter chronology
Something in Common (1989)	Duets (1989)	Now's the Time (1990)

Duets is an album by vocalist Helen Merrill and bassist Ron Carter recorded in 1989 and released on the EmArcy label.

== Reception ==
Professional ratings
Review scores
Source	Rating
AllMusic	4.5/5 stars

The AllMusic review by Scott Yanow called it an "intimate and generally enjoyable set" stating "There is not a great deal of variety, and Merrill's voice has sounded stronger elsewhere, but their versions of "I Fall in Love Too Easily," "A Child Is Born," "Autumn Leaves," and "There Is No Greater Love" are memorable. One certainly has to admire Merrill's constant desire to take chances in her recordings".

== Track listing ==
1. "I Fall in Love Too Easily" (Jule Styne, Sammy Cahn) – 3:11
2. "A Child Is Born" (Thad Jones, Alec Wilder) – 5:35
3. "Come Home Again" (Torrie Zito, Helen Merrill) – 2:30
4. "Little Waltz" (Ron Carter) – 4:21
5. "You and the Night and the Music" (Arthur Schwartz, Howard Dietz) – 2:20
6. "Autumn Leaves" (Joseph Kosma, Jacques Prévert, Johnny Mercer) – 2:48
7. "Come Rain or Come Shine" (Harold Arlen, Mercer) – 2:34
8. "In a Mellow Tone" (Duke Ellington, Milt Gabler) – 2:49
9. "The Summer Knows" (Michel Legrand, Alan Bergman, Marilyn Bergman) – 3:26
10. "There Is No Greater Love" (Isham Jones, Marty Symes) – 4:05
11. "Lover Man" (Jimmy Davis, Ram Ramirez, James Sherman) – 5:00
12. "My Funny Valentine" (Richard Rodgers, Lorenz Hart) – 4:17
13. "I Don't Stand a Ghost of a Chance with You" (Victor Young, Bing Crosby, Ned Washington) – 6:17

== Personnel ==
- Helen Merrill – vocals
- Ron Carter – bass
- Victor See-Yuen – percussion
