= Out of Nowhere (Don Ellis album) =

Studio album by Don Ellis
- Released: 1988
- Recorded: April 21, 1961; Nola Penthouse Studios, New York City
- Genre: Jazz
- Length: 44:28
- Labels: Candid; CS 9032
- Producer: Nat Hentoff

Don Ellis chronology
How Time Passes (1960)	Out of Nowhere (1988)	New Ideas (1961)

Out of Nowhere is an album by trumpeter Don Ellis recorded in 1961 but not released on the Candid label until 1988.

== Reception ==
Professional ratings
Review scores
Source	Rating
AllMusic	4/5 stars
The Penguin Guide to Jazz	3/4 stars

AllMusic stated: "The players constantly take chances with time but there are few slipups or hesitant moments. A fascinating and long-lost session". The Penguin Guide to Jazz wrote that "Ellis plays lines and melodic inversions of considerable inventiveness, always striking out for the microtonal terrain he was to colonise later in the '60s".

== Track listing ==
1. "Sweet and Lovely" (Gus Arnheim, Jules LeMare, Harry Tobias) - 6:11
2. "My Funny Valentine" (Lorenz Hart, Richard Rodgers) - 4:28
3. "I Love You" [take 2] (Cole Porter) - 4:39
4. "I'll Remember April" (Gene de Paul, Patricia Johnston, Don Raye) - 3:33
5. "Just One of Those Things" [take 8] (Porter) - 3:41
6. "You Stepped out of a Dream" (Nacio Herb Brown, Gus Kahn) - 3:46
7. "All the Things You Are" (Oscar Hammerstein II, Jerome Kern) - 6:10
8. "Out of Nowhere" (Johnny Green, Edward Heyman) - 3:45
9. "Just One of Those Things" [take 5] (Porter) - 3:32 Bonus track on CD reissue
10. "I Love You" [take 1] (Porter) - 5:36 Bonus track on CD reissue

== Personnel ==
- Don Ellis - trumpet
- Paul Bley - piano
- Steve Swallow - bass
