= Jazz & Bossa =

Studio album by Ron Carter
- Released: July 15, 2008
- Recorded: April 21, 2008
- Studio: Avatar (New York, New York)
- Genre: Jazz
- Length: 46:13
- Label: Blue Note 50999 2 28104 2 7
- Producer: Ron Carter

Ron Carter chronology
It's the Time (2007)	Jazz & Bossa (2008)	Ron Carter's Great Big Band (2011)

Jazz & Bossa is a studio album by jazz bassist Ron Carter released on July 15, 2008, via Blue Note label.

== Track listing ==
No.	Title	Writer(s)	Length
1.	"Salt Song (Canção Do Sal)"	Milton Nascimento, Romero Lubambo	8:48
2.	"Whisper Not"	Benny Golson	5:56
3.	"Por-De-Sol"	Carter	5:51
4.	"De Samba"	Carter	6:22
5.	"No More Blues (Chega De Saudade)"	Antonio Carlos Jobim, Vinicius De Moraes	3:57
6.	"Obrigado"	Carter	3:16
7.	"Ah, Rio"	Carter	4:02
8.	"Wave"	Antonio Carlos Jobim	5:43
9.	"Saudade"	Carter	2:09
Total length:			46:13

== Personnel ==
- Ron Carter – bass, producer, composer (tracks 3–4, 6–7, 9)
- Portinho – drums
- Guilherme Monteiro – guitar
- Rolando Morales-Matos – percussion
- Stephen Scott – piano
- Javon Jackson – tenor saxophone
