= The Maestro (Cedar Walton album) =

Studio album by Cedar Walton
- Released: 1981
- Recorded: December 15, 1980; Hollywood, CA
- Genre: Jazz
- Label: Muse; MR 5244
- Producer: Cedar Walton

Cedar Walton chronology
Soundscapes (1980)	The Maestro (1981)	Piano Solos (1981)

The Maestro is an album by pianist Cedar Walton with guest vocalist Abbey Lincoln recorded in 1980 and released on the Muse label.

== Reception ==
Professional ratings
Review scores
Source	Rating
Allmusic	4/5 stars

Allmusic awarded the album 4 stars calling it "A well-rounded and easily recommended set of advanced straightahead jazz."

== Track listing ==
1. "The Maestro" (Cedar Walton) – 4:38
2. "Rhythm-a-Ning" (Thelonious Monk) – 6:30
3. "Not in Love" (Abbey Lincoln) – 3:30
4. "Sabiá" (Antônio Carlos Jobim, Chico Buarque) – 6:22
5. "In a Sentimental Mood" (Duke Ellington, Manny Kurtz, Irving Mills) – 6:50
6. "Blue Monk" (Monk) – 4:49
7. "Castles" (Lincoln) – 4:49
8. "On the Trail" (Ferde Grofé) – 3:40

== Personnel ==
- Cedar Walton – piano
- Abbey Lincoln – vocals (tracks 1, 3, 5 & 7)
- Bob Berg – tenor saxophone (tracks 1, 2 & 4–8)
- David Williams – bass
- Billy Higgins – drums
