= Global Warming (Sonny Rollins album) =

1998 studio album by Sonny Rollins

Studio album by Sonny Rollins
- Released: 1998
- Recorded: January 7 & February 28, 1998
- Genre: Jazz
- Length: 50:01
- Label: Milestone
- Producer: Sonny Rollins

Sonny Rollins chronology
Sonny Rollins + 3 (1995)	Global Warming (1998)	This Is What I Do (2000)

Global Warming is a studio album by jazz saxophonist Sonny Rollins, released in 1998 on Milestone Records. This album peaked at No. 25 on the US Billboard Traditional Jazz Albums chart.

== Background ==
Global Warming features performances by Stephen Scott, Bob Cranshaw, Idris Muhammad, Clifton Anderson, Victor See Yuen and Perry Wilson.

== Reception ==
Professional ratings
Review scores
Source	Rating
AllMusic	4/5 stars
The Penguin Guide to Jazz Recordings	3.5/4 stars

The AllMusic review by Cub Koda states: "Rollins' blowing is impassioned throughout and the surroundings are nice and intimate, making this a very inspired set."

== Track listing ==
All compositions by Sonny Rollins except as indicated

1. "Island Lady" - 9:07
2. "Echo-Side Blue" - 7:15
3. "Global Warming" - 6:30
4. "Mother Nature's Blues" - 11:26
5. "Change Partners" (Irving Berlin) - 8:36
6. "Clear-Cut Boogie" - 7:07

- Recorded in NY on January 7 (tracks 2, 4 & 5) and February 28 (tracks 1, 3 & 6), 1998

== Personnel ==
- Sonny Rollins - tenor saxophone
- Stephen Scott - piano, kalimba
- Bob Cranshaw - electric bass
- Idris Muhammad - drums (tracks 2, 4 & 5)
- Clifton Anderson - trombone (tracks 1, 3 & 6)
- Perry Wilson - drums (tracks 1, 3 & 6)
- Victor See Yuen - percussion (tracks 1, 3 & 6)
