= Piano Solos (Cedar Walton album) =

Studio album by Cedar Walton
- Released: 1981
- Recorded: August 1981; Audio System at Orpheus Music, NYC
- Genre: Jazz
- Label: Clean Cuts; CC 704

Cedar Walton chronology
The Maestro (1981)	Piano Solos (1981)	Heart & Soul (1982)

Piano Solos is an album by pianist Cedar Walton recorded in 1981 and released on the Clean Cuts label.

== Reception ==
Professional ratings
Review scores
Source	Rating
Allmusic	4/5 stars
The Rolling Stone Jazz Record Guide	4/5 stars

Allmusic awarded the album 4 stars.

== Track listing ==
All compositions by Cedar Walton except as indicated

1. "Sunday Suite in Four Movements"
2. "30° to the Wind"
3. "Over the Rainbow" (Harold Arlen, Yip Harburg)
4. "Clockwise"
5. "Cedar's Blues"
6. "I'll Let You Know"

== Personnel ==
- Cedar Walton - piano
