= When Skies Are Grey... =

Studio album by Ron Carter
- Released: February 13, 2001
- Recorded: May 1, 2000
- Studio: Clinton Recording Studios, NYC
- Genre: Jazz
- Length: 48:25
- Label: Somethin' Else; TOCJ-68049
- Producer: Ron Carter

Ron Carter chronology
Holiday In Rio (2000)	When Skies Are Grey... (2001)	Dialogues (2000)

Stardust is an album by bassist Ron Carter recorded in 2000 and originally released on the Japanese Somethin' Else label with a US release on Blue Note Records.

== Reception ==
Professional ratings
Review scores
Source	Rating
AllMusic	3/5 stars
The Penguin Guide to Jazz Recordings	3/4 stars

The AllMusic review by David R. Adler said "This beautiful, Latin-themed album by bass superpower Ron Carter almost can stand in as a Stephen Scott showcase, for the young pianist's verve and finesse are in evidence from start to finish. Carter reserves plenty of solo room (and a number of melody statements) for himself, however ... When Skies Are Grey contains nothing ambitious or wildly innovative -- just great, accessible music. Fans of Stephen Scott in particular can't miss with this one". On PopMatters, Simon Warner stated "Ultimately When Skies Are Grey, made in the shadow of Carter's wife's death, is a serious accomplishment". On All About Jazz, Michael Fortuna wrote "When Skies Are Grey is an impressive, unique mixture of two electrifying genres from one of jazz's most prolific bassists".

== Track listing ==
All compositions by Ron Carter except where noted

1. "Loose Change" – 7:08
2. "Bésame Mucho" (Consuelo Velázquez, Sunny Skylar) – 7:05
3. "Caminando" – 7:08
4. "Qué Pasa" – 5:30
5. "Corcovado" (Antônio Carlos Jobim) – 7:22
6. "Cubano Chant" (Ray Bryant) – 6:00
7. "Mi Tiempo" – 8:12

== Personnel ==
- Ron Carter - bass
- Stephen Scott – piano
- Harvey Mason – drums
- Steve Kroon – percussion
