= Super Strings =

Studio album by Ron Carter
- Released: 1981
- Recorded: April 14–15, 1981
- Studio: Aura Recording Studios, New York City
- Genre: Jazz
- Length: 41:57
- Label: Milestone; M-9100
- Producer: Retrac Productions

Ron Carter chronology
Empire Jazz (1980)	Super Strings (1981)	Heart & Soul (1981)

Super Strings is an album by bassist Ron Carter which was recorded in 1981 and released on the Milestone label.

== Reception ==
Professional ratings
Review scores
Source	Rating
AllMusic	3/5 stars

The AllMusic review by Alex Henderson called it an "enjoyable (if less than essential) LP", stating: "Jazz-with-strings projects are often examples of mood music or easy listening; this LP, however, is more diverse than that." On All About Jazz, Derek Taylor said: "Hiring on an entire string orchestra Carter takes a stab at placing his virtuosity in front of a lushly orchestrated backdrop and ends up with bromidic mood music ... Carter's career ranks among the most prolific in jazz, and as such the overproduction and narcissism that spoil this a date make it one best left a forgotten entry."

== Track listing ==
All compositions by Ron Carter except where noted.

1. "Bom Dia" – 6:43
2. "Don't Misunderstand" (Gordon Parks) – 6:15
3. "Super Strings" – 7:30
4. "Bitin'" – 5:25
5. "No Flowers, Please" – 5:15
6. "Uptown Conversation" – 10:49

== Personnel ==
- Ron Carter – piccolo bass, bass, arranger
- Kenny Barron – piano
- John Tropea – guitar
- Jack DeJohnette – drums
- Ralph MacDonald – percussion
- Sanford Allen – concertmaster, violin
- Lamar Alsop, Sandra Billingslea, Harry Cykman, Glenn Dicterow, Kenneth Gordon, Stanley Hunte, Alfio Micci, Marion Pinheiro, John Pintavalle, Richard Young – violin
- Jesse Levine, Maxine Roach, Harry Zaratzian – viola
- Charles McCracken, Kermit Moore, Eugene Moye Jr. – cello
- Leon Maleson – contrabass
- Wade Marcus – string arranger
