= Spanish Blue (album) =

Studio album by Ron Carter
- Released: 1975
- Recorded: November 18, 1974
- Studio: Van Gelder Studio, Englewood Cliffs, NJ
- Genre: Jazz
- Length: 34:07
- Label: CTI
- Producer: Creed Taylor

Ron Carter chronology
All Blues (1973)	Spanish Blue (1975)	Anything Goes (1975)

Spanish Blue is an album by bassist Ron Carter recorded at Van Gelder Studio in New Jersey in 1974 and released on the CTI label.

== Reception ==
The Allmusic review by Ron Wynn awarded the album 2½ stars, calling it an "Interesting concept with good solos".

Professional ratings
Review scores
Source	Rating
Allmusic	2.5/5 stars
The Rolling Stone Jazz Record Guide	3/5 stars

== Track listing ==
All compositions by Ron Carter except where noted

1. "El Noche Sol" - 5:56
2. "So What" (Miles Davis) - 11:24
3. "Sabado Sombrero" - 6:14
4. "Arkansas" - 10:33
- Recorded at Van Gelder Studio in Englewood Cliffs, New Jersey, on November 18, 1974

== Personnel ==
- Ron Carter - bass
- Hubert Laws - flute
- Roland Hanna - electric piano, piano (tracks 1–3)
- Leon Pendarvis - electric piano (track 4)
- Jay Berliner (track 3) - guitar
- Billy Cobham - drums, field drum
- Ralph MacDonald - percussion
