= Telephone (album) =

Live album by Ron Carter and Jim Hall
- Released: 1985
- Recorded: August 1984
- Venue: Concord Pavilion, Concord, CA
- Genre: Jazz
- Length: 43:43
- Label: Concord Jazz; CJ-270
- Producer: Carl Jefferson

Ron Carter chronology
| Live at Village West (1982) | Telephone (1985) | Ron Carter Plays Bach (1985) |

Jim Hall chronology
| Live at Village West (1982) | Telephone (1984) | Jim Hall's Three (1986) |

Telephone is a live album by bassist Ron Carter and guitarist Jim Hall recorded at the Concord Pavilion in 1984 and released on the Concord Jazz label.

== Reception ==
Professional ratings
Review scores
| Source | Rating |
|---|---|
| AllMusic | 5/5 stars |

The AllMusic review by Michael Erlewine said "A live performance -- a concert. Lots of space, and a slow pace. Music to listen to, perhaps a tad too intellectual. Still... lovely".

== Track listing ==
1. "Telephone" (Ron Carter) – 5:32
2. "Indian Summer" (Victor Herbert, Al Dubin) – 5:54
3. "Candlelight" (Carter) – 4:15
4. "Chorale and Dance" (Jim Hall) – 6:50
5. "Alone Together" (Arthur Schwartz, Howard Dietz) – 10:29
6. "Stardust" (Hoagy Carmichael, Mitchell Parish) – 7:44
7. "Two's Blues" (Hall) – 4:42

== Personnel ==
- Ron Carter - bass
- Jim Hall – guitar
