= Blues Farm =

Studio album by Ron Carter
- Released: 1973
- Recorded: January 10, 1973
- Studio: Van Gelder Studio, Englewood Cliffs, NJ
- Genre: Jazz
- Length: 36:15
- Label: CTI
- Producer: Creed Taylor

Ron Carter chronology
Alone Together (1972)	Blues Farm (1973)	All Blues (1973)

Blues Farm is an album by bassist Ron Carter recorded at Van Gelder Studio in New Jersey in 1973 and released on the CTI label.

== Reception ==
Professional ratings
Review scores
Source	Rating
Allmusic	2.5/5 stars
The Rolling Stone Jazz Record Guide	4/5 stars
The Penguin Guide to Jazz Recordings	3/4 stars

Allmusic reviewer Nathan Bush states "Blues Farm's excursions are enjoyable, but somewhat reserved. Both the compositions and performances avoid strong emotions in favor of pleasing palettes of color and texture".

== Track listing ==
All compositions by Ron Carter except as indicated

1. "Blues Farm" - 7:59
2. "A Small Ballad" - 5:38
3. "Django" (John Lewis) - 5:30
4. "A Hymn for Him" - 8:11
5. "Two-Beat Johnson" - 2:49
6. "R2, M1" - 6:08
- Recorded at Van Gelder Studio in Englewood Cliffs, New Jersey on January 10, 1973

== Personnel ==
- Ron Carter - bass, arranger, conductor
- Hubert Laws - flute (tracks 1, 5 & 6)
- Richard Tee - electric piano, piano (tracks 1, 4 & 5)
- Bob James - piano (tracks 2, 3 & 6)
- Gene Bertoncini (track 5), Sam Brown (track 3) - guitar
- Billy Cobham - drums
- Ralph MacDonald - percussion (tracks 1 & 4–6)
