= Yellow & Green (Ron Carter album) =

Studio album by Ron Carter
- Released: 1976
- Recorded: May 17, 18 and 20, 1976
- Studio: Van Gelder Studio, Englewood Cliffs, NJ
- Genre: Jazz
- Length: 36:44
- Label: CTI
- Producer: Creed Taylor

Ron Carter chronology
| Anything Goes (1975) | Yellow & Green (1976) | Pastels (1976) |

Yellow & Green is an album by bassist Ron Carter recorded at Van Gelder Studio in New Jersey in 1976 and released on the CTI label.

== Reception ==
Professional ratings
Review scores
| Source | Rating |
|---|---|
| Allmusic | 1.5/5 stars |
| The Rolling Stone Jazz Record Guide | 3/5 stars |

Allmusic reviewer Jim Todd calls the album "A low point for bassist Ron Carter, this aimless set suffers from the malaise that hit the jazz scene after the fusion boom of the late '60s and early '70s... An episode best forgotten".

== Track listing ==
All compositions by Ron Carter except where noted

1. "Tenaj" - 7:44
2. "Receipt, Please" - 7:05
3. "Willow Weep for Me" (Ann Ronell) - 2:40
4. "Yellow and Green" - 6:13
5. "Opus 15" - 6:55
6. "Epistrophy" (Kenny Clarke, Thelonious Monk) - 6:07

== Personnel ==
- Ron Carter - bass, piccolo bass, cowbell, tambourine
- Kenny Barron - piano (track 1, 5 & 6)
- Don Grolnick - piano, electric piano (track 2 & 4)
- Hugh McCracken - guitar, harmonica (tracks 1, 2, 4 & 5)
- Billy Cobham (tracks 1, 2, 4 & 5), Ben Riley (track 6) - drums
- Dom Um Romão - percussion (tracks 2 & 5)
