= Panamanhattan =

Live album by Ron Carter and Richard Galliano
- Released: 1991
- Recorded: July 23, 1990
- Venue: Fnac Montparnasse, Paris, France
- Genre: Jazz
- Length: 50:43
- Label: Dreyfus Jazz; FDM 36514.2
- Producer: François Lacharme, Philippe Briday

Ron Carter chronology
Eight Plus (1982)	Panamanhattan (1991)	Ron Carter Meets Bach (1991)

Richard Galliano chronology
Spleen (1985)	Panamanhattan (1990)	Flyin' the Coop (1991)

Panamanhattan is a live album by American bassist Ron Carter and accordionist Richard Galliano recorded in Paris in 1990 and released on the Dreyfus Jazz label.

== Reception ==
Professional ratings
Review scores
Source	Rating
AllMusic	3/5 stars
The Penguin Guide to Jazz Recordings	3/4 stars

The AllMusic review by Michael Erlewine said "the free-reed sound of the accordion on this recording is both subtle and lovely. Tempos range from ballads to medium, but tend to be on the slow side. Not breakthrough jazz, these duets (recorded live, in concert) are refreshing and what all good music should be, just good listening".

== Track listing ==
All compositions by Richard Galliano except where noted

1. "Summer in Central Park" (Horace Silver) – 5:40
2. "Spleen" – 7:03
3. "Doom" (Ron Carter) – 4:48
4. "Allée des Brouillards" – 3:33
5. "A Small Ballad" (Carter) – 5:38
6. "Portrait Of Jennie" (J. Russel Robinson, Gordon Burdge) – 7:33
7. "Ballade pour Marion" – 4:19
8. "Little Waltz" (Carter) – 7:24
9. "Des Voiliers" – 4:09

== Personnel ==
- Ron Carter - bass
- Richard Galliano – accordion
