= Dear Miles =

Studio album by Ron Carter
- Released: 2007
- Recorded: February 18, 2006
- Studio: Avatar (New York, New York)
- Genre: Jazz
- Length: 52:54
- Label: Somethin' Else; TOCJ-68073
- Producer: Ron Carter for Retrac Productions

Ron Carter chronology
Just Between Friends (2005)	Dear Miles (2007)	It's the Time (2007)

Dear Miles is an album by American bassist Ron Carter recorded in 2006 and originally released on the Japanese Somethin' Else label with a US release on Blue Note Records.

== Reception ==
Professional ratings
Review scores
Source	Rating
AllMusic	4/5 stars
All About Jazz	5/5 stars
The Penguin Guide to Jazz Recordings	3/4 stars

The AllMusic review by Scott Yanow said "Dear Miles is a cheerful and upbeat session, most highly recommended to listeners who enjoy hearing a lot of bass solos". In JazzTimes, Doug Ramsey stated "Dear Miles maintains Carter’s high standard ... This is music-making at the highest level". On All About Jazz, J. Hunter wrote "Dear Miles is a fantastic set of bold interpretations; it is respectful to its subject while never losing its need to be unique. I'd say that sounds like Miles to a T".

== Track listing ==
1. "Gone" (Gil Evans) – 4:47
2. "Seven Steps to Heaven" (Miles Davis, Victor Feldman) – 4:53
3. "My Funny Valentine" (Richard Rodgers, Lorenz Hart) – 8:04
4. "Bags' Groove" (Milt Jackson) – 3:43
5. "Someday My Prince Will Come" (Frank Churchill, Larry Morey) – 6:45
6. "Cut and Paste" (Ron Carter) – 4:37
7. "Stella by Starlight" (Victor Young, Ned Washington) – 5:03
8. "As Time Goes By" (Herman Hupfeld) – 4:58
9. "Bye Bye Blackbird" (Ray Henderson, Mort Dixon) – 5:28
10. "595" (Ron Carter) – 4:36

== Personnel ==
- Ron Carter - bass
- Stephen Scott – piano
- Payton Crossley – drums
- Roger Squitero – percussion
