= Just Between Friends (album) =

Studio album by Houston Person and Ron Carter
- Released: May 6, 2008
- Recorded: October 26, 2005
- Studio: Van Gelder Studio, Englewood Cliffs, NJ
- Genre: Jazz
- Length: 53:49
- Label: HighNote; HCD 7188
- Producer: Houston Person

Houston Person chronology
All Soul (2005)	Just Between Friends (2008)	Thinking of You (2007)

Ron Carter chronology
The Golden Striker (2002)	Just Between Friends (2005)	Dear Miles (2006)

Just Between Friends is an album by saxophonist Houston Person and bassist Ron Carter recorded in 2005 and released on the HighNote label in 2008.

== Reception ==
Professional ratings
Review scores
Source	Rating
AllMusic	3.5/5 stars

The AllMusic review by Jeff Tamarkin said "Immediately, Houston Person's saxophone and Ron Carter's bass meld so fluidly and effortlessly -- and create such a complete picture -- that it's easy to forget that they are the only two musicians playing. Drums are not missed, nor are piano, horns, or anything else: Person and Carter's communication skills here, as on their previous outings together, are never in doubt; they're "always" in perfect sync. ... It's a collaboration in the truest sense, one in which emotion and the integrity of the material and arrangements trounce showboating". In JazzTimes, Steve Futterman stated "A palpable sense of intimacy, ease and near-telepathic intuition practically radiates from the disc ... Taking their time, savoring sturdy melodies and ingenious changes, allowing the sheer beauty of their respective tones to score major points, letting offhand virtuosity speak for itself, this duo practically luxuriates in generous music-making ... A swing-to-bop stylist now in the golden age of his artistic maturity, Person couldn't sound more relaxed, more willing to impart emotion through the warmth of his sound and the judicious construction of a perfectly devised phrase. Carter, for his part, carries the load of rhythm, harmony and unaccompanied soloist with a grace that will only surprise those that haven't thrilled to the best of his five-decades-long work". On All About Jazz, Terrel Kent Holmes observed "Houston Person plays sax with a tone whose smoothness and flawlessness complements Carter perfectly and their seamless interplay on Just Between Friends comes with familiarity and experience. Carter takes pleasantly meandering paths during his solos, enjoying the freedom that playing with a vet like Person affords".

== Track listing ==
1. "How Deep Is the Ocean" (Irving Berlin) – 5:08
2. "You've Changed" (Bill Carey, Carl Fischer) – 5:10
3. "Blueberry Hill" (Vincent Rose, Larry Stock, Al Lewis) – 5:53
4. "Darn That Dream" (Jimmy Van Heusen, Eddie DeLange) – 6:25
5. "Meditation" (Antonio Carlos Jobim, Newton Mendonça, Norman Gimbel) – 5:25
6. "Lover Man (Oh, Where Can You Be?)" (Jimmy Davis, Ram Ramirez, James Sherman) – 5:23
7. "Lover, Come Back to Me" (Sigmund Romberg, Oscar Hammerstein II ) – 4:26
8. "Polka Dots and Moonbeams" (Jimmy Van Heusen, Johnny Burke) – 4:15
9. "Always" (Berlin) – 6:01
10. "Alone Together" (Arthur Schwartz, Howard Dietz) – 5:43

== Personnel ==
- Houston Person - tenor saxophone
- Ron Carter - bass
