= All Alone (2013 film) =

- Directed by: Ehsan Abdipour
- Written by: Ehsan Abdipour
- Produced by: Edris Abdipour
- Starring: Meisam Farhoumand
- Cinematography: Saed Nikzat
- Music by: Sattar Oraki
- Release date: February 2013
- Country: Iran
- Language: Persian

All Alone is an Iranian movie released in February 2013. The film is about a teenage boy who lives on an island and wants to meet the president and talk about the problems that a boycott has brought to his family's life. The film is directed by Ehsan Abdipour, who won the best directing award for creativity and original screenplay in the Iran Cinema Festival, 2013.

== Plot ==
Rangerou is the nickname of a teenage boy living on one of the Persian Gulf islands with his family. He works to support his family while still in school. He sells fish at the Russian campus, where engineers who are working on the island's nuclear site live. One night, he dreams about a UFO and an abandoned alien, but believes it was real. The next day, he tells his story to everybody he meets, but no one believes it except for a Russian boy of his age. Soon they became good friends even though they couldn't speak the same language. After some time, Rangerou, who learns Russian by practice, understands that his friend and all other foreigners have to leave Iran for some obscure political reasons.

Civil airplanes are replaced by a fighter aircraft and the island is isolated in order to protect the nuclear site.

He learns that all the world leaders will attend a conference in Belgium. He writes a letter to them about his friendship with his Russian friend. He decides to find a way to go there and read his letter to the World Leaders.
