= Stardust (Ron Carter album) =

Studio album by Ron Carter
- Released: 2001
- Recorded: April 6, 2001
- Studio: Clinton Recording Studios, NYC
- Genre: Jazz
- Length: 52:10
- Label: Somethin' Else; TOCJ-68049
- Producer: Ron Carter

Ron Carter chronology
Dialogues (2000)	Stardust (2001)	The Golden Striker (2002)

Stardust is an album by bassist Ron Carter recorded in 2001 and originally released on the Japanese Somethin' Else label with a US release on Blue Note Records.

== Reception ==
Professional ratings
Review scores
Source	Rating
AllMusic	3/5 stars
The Penguin Guide to Jazz Recordings	3.5/4 stars

The AllMusic review by David R. Adler said "Stardust is another satisfying record from Ron Carter, this one in part a tribute to the late Oscar Pettiford. ... Golson and Hanna are in particularly good form, their richly seasoned sounds meshing well with the élan of the younger Locke". On PopMatters, Maurice Bottomley stated "Stardust is, conceptually, a tribute to the work of Oscar Pettiford. It is also just about the strongest of some very impressive small group releases doing the rounds ... not only the most accomplished but also one of the most instantly likeable of this year's releases. As unpretentious and self-effacing as it is impressive,Stardust is an aptly named delight".

== Track listing ==
All compositions by Ron Carter except where noted

1. "Tamalpais" (Oscar Pettiford) – 6:32
2. "The Man I Love" (George Gershwin, Ira Gershwin) – 7:50
3. "Nearly" – 10:26
4. "Bohemia After Dark" (Pettiford) – 6:38
5. "Tail Feathers" – 5:57
6. "Blues in the Closet" (Pettiford) – 4:52
7. "That's Deep" – 5:57
8. "Stardust" (Hoagy Carmichael, Mitchell Parish) – 3:58

== Personnel ==
- Ron Carter - bass
- Sir Roland Hanna – piano
- Benny Golson – tenor saxophone (tracks 1–5)
- Joe Locke – vibraphone (tracks 1, 3–6)
- Lenny White – drums (tracks 1–7)
