= Empire Jazz =

Studio album by Ron Carter
- Released: 1980
- Recorded: 1980
- Studio: Aura Recording Studios, New York City
- Genre: Jazz
- Length: 40:19
- Label: RSO; RS-1-3085
- Producer: Ron Carter

Ron Carter chronology
| Parfait (1980) | Empire Jazz (1980) | Super Strings (1981) |

Empire Jazz is an album by bassist Ron Carter featuring jazz interpretations of five of John Williams' themes from The Empire Strikes Back which was recorded in 1980 and released on the RSO label.

== Reception ==
Professional ratings
Review scores
| Source | Rating |
|---|---|
| AllMusic | 3/5 stars |

The AllMusic review by Scott Yanow stated "the all-star group has plenty of solo space and the music is transformed into reasonably creative jazz".

== Track listing ==
All compositions by John Williams.

1. "The Imperial March (Darth Vader's Theme)" – 8:33
2. "The Asteroid Field" – 9:08
3. "Han Solo and the Princess (Love Theme)" – 8:09
4. "Lando's Palace" – 7:04
5. "Yoda's Theme" – 5:25

== Personnel ==
- Ron Carter – bass, arranger
- Jon Faddis, Joe Shepley – trumpet, flugelhorn
- Eddie Bert – trombone
- Hubert Laws – flute
- Frank Wess – tenor saxophone, soprano saxophone
- Bob James – piano
- Jay Berliner – electric guitar, acoustic guitar
- Billy Cobham - drums
- Ralph MacDonald – percussion

Album cover Artwork: Jeff Wack
