= Parfait (album) =

Studio album by Ron Carter Quartet
- Released: 1982
- Recorded: September 29, 1980
- Studio: Van Gelder Studio, Englewood Cliffs, NJ
- Genre: Jazz
- Length: 36:32
- Label: Milestone; M-9107
- Producer: Ron Carter for Retrac Productions

Ron Carter chronology
Patrão (1980)	Parfait (1982)	Empire Jazz (1980)

Parfait is an album by the double bassist Ron Carter which was recorded at Van Gelder Studio in 1980 and released on the Milestone label in 1982.

Professional ratings
Review scores
Source	Rating
AllMusic	2/5 stars
The Rolling Stone Jazz Record Guide	3/5 stars
The Virgin Encyclopedia of Jazz	3/5 stars

== Track listing ==
All compositions by Ron Carter except where noted.

1. "Parfait" – 4:48
2. "New Waltz" – 6:00
3. "Receipt, Please" – 7:15
4. "Blues for D.P." – 10:33
5. "'Round Midnight" (Thelonious Monk, Cootie Williams) – 7:56

== Personnel ==
- Ron Carter – piccolo bass
- Ted Lo – piano
- Leon Maleson – double bass
- Wilby Fletcher – drums
