= The Golden Striker (Ron Carter album) =

Studio album by Ron Carter
- Released: August 19, 2003
- Recorded: July 20, 2002
- Studio: Avatar (New York, New York)
- Genre: Jazz
- Length: 48:14
- Label: Somethin' Else; TOCJ-68056
- Producer: Ron Carter for Retrac Productions

Ron Carter chronology
Stardust (2001)	The Golden Striker (2003)	Just Between Friends (2005)

The Golden Striker is an album by bassist Ron Carter. It was recorded in 2002 and originally released on the Japanese Somethin' Else label with a US release on Blue Note Records.

== Reception ==
Professional ratings
Review scores
Source	Rating
AllMusic	2.5/5 stars
The Penguin Guide to Jazz Recordings	2.5/4 stars

The AllMusic review by Thom Jurek said the album "comes off as too relaxed, too low-key, and basically uninspiring". In JazzTimes, Thomas Conrad stated "The Golden Striker is chamber jazz of a high order. ... The musicianship in this trio is so refined and the sharing of ideas so selfless that the transitions from the predetermined to the collectively discovered to the individual statement are seamless". On Jazz Review, Don Williamson wrote "The Golden Striker is yet another of Ron Carter's recordings of musical gems that glow, rather than glitter, as he develops memorable tunes, nonetheless deceptively difficult to achieve in the hands of less accomplished musicians, that listeners would want to hear repeatedly because of their beauty and accessibility".

== Track listing ==
All compositions by Ron Carter except where noted

1. "The Golden Striker" (John Lewis) – 5:22
2. "On and On" (Mulgrew Miller) – 3:01
3. "NY Slick" – 4:08
4. "Concierto de Aranjuez (Adagio Theme)" (Joaquín Rodrigo) – 7:02
5. "Cedar Tree" (Russell Malone) – 5:04
6. "A Quick Sketch" – 6:27
7. "Parade" – 5:32
8. "A Theme in 3/4" – 5:20
9. "Autumn Leaves" (Joseph Kosma, Jacques Prévert, Johnny Mercer) – 6:18

== Personnel ==
- Ron Carter – bass
- Mulgrew Miller – piano
- Russell Malone – guitar
