= A Song for You (Ron Carter album) =

Studio album by Ron Carter
- Released: 1978
- Recorded: June 1978
- Studio: Van Gelder Studio in Englewood Cliffs, NJ
- Genre: Jazz
- Label: Milestone; M-9086
- Producer: Ron Carter

Ron Carter chronology
Peg Leg (1977)	A Song for You (1978)	1 + 3 (1978)

A Song for You is an album by bassist Ron Carter recorded at Van Gelder Studio in 1978 and released on the Milestone label.

== Reception ==
Professional ratings
Review scores
Source	Rating
AllMusic	3/5 stars
The Rolling Stone Jazz Record Guide	3/5 stars

AllMusic awarded the album 3 stars with its review by Ron Wynn stating, "A change of pace session for Carter... Things generally work, although sometimes the low energy level and lack of tension threaten to turn this into easy listening material".

== Track listing ==
All compositions by Ron Carter.

1. "A Song for You" (Leon Russell) – 4:51
2. "El Ojo de Dios" – 6:35
3. "A Quiet Place" (Ralph Carmichael) – 6:14
4. "Good Time" – 7:00
5. "Someday My Prince Will Come" (Frank Churchill, Larry Morey) – 5:01
6. "N.O. Blues" – 6:26

== Personnel ==
- Ron Carter – bass, piccolo bass, arranger
- Leon Pendarvis (track 1), Kenny Barron (tracks 2–6) – piano
- Jay Berliner – acoustic guitar, electric guitar (tracks 1–3)
- Jack DeJohnette – drums
- Ralph MacDonald – percussion (tracks 1–3, 5, 6)
- John Abramowitz, Richard Locker, Charles McCracken, Kermit Moore – cello
