= Orfeu (album) =

Studio album by Ron Carter Sextet
- Released: November 2, 1999
- Recorded: February 1 and March 18, 1999
- Studio: Avatar (New York, New York)
- Genre: Jazz
- Length: 45:18
- Label: Somethin' Else; TOCJ-68042
- Producer: Ron Carter

Ron Carter chronology
| So What? (1998) | Orfeu (1999) | Holiday in Rio (2000) |

Orfeu is an album by bassist Ron Carter recorded in 1999 and originally released on the Japanese Somethin' Else label with a US release on Blue Note Records.

== Reception ==
Professional ratings
Review scores
| Source | Rating |
|---|---|
| AllMusic | 3/5 stars |
| The Penguin Guide to Jazz Recordings | 3/4 stars |

The AllMusic review by David R. Adler said, "This record could have been merely one more Latin-themed album by an American jazz musician. But creative production choices and fantastic musicianship make it artistically solid and uncommonly beautiful". In JazzTimes, Owen Cordle stated "The group mixes the melodic side of jazz improvisation with the subtle insinuation of the various supporting rhythms ...This is one of his better albums as a leader". On All About Jazz, Jim Santella wrote "Highly recommended, Ron Carter's Orfeu combines mainstream jazz with lyrical Brazilian charm for an outstanding session".

== Track listing ==
All compositions by Ron Carter except where noted

1. "Saudade" – 6:34
2. "Manhã de Carnaval" (Luiz Bonfá, Antônio Maria) – 5:57
3. "Por-Do-Sol" – 5:17
4. "Goin' Home" (Antonin Dvorák, Carter) – 7:27
5. "117 Special" – 6:53
6. "Obrigado" – 5:34
7. "Samba de Orfeu" (Bonfá, Maria) – 7:36

== Personnel ==
- Ron Carter – bass
- Houston Person – tenor saxophone
- Stephen Scott – piano
- Bill Frisell – guitar
- Payton Crossley – drums
- Steve Kroon – percussion
