= Heart & Soul (Ron Carter and Cedar Walton album) =

Studio album by Ron Carter/Cedar Walton Duo
- Released: 1982
- Recorded: December 1981
- Studio: Soundtek Studios, NYC
- Genre: Jazz
- Length: 40:26
- Label: Timeless; SJP 158
- Producer: Wim Wigt

Cedar Walton chronology
Piano Solos (1981)	Heart & Soul (1982)	Among Friends (1982)

Ron Carter chronology
Super Strings (1981)	Heart & Soul (1981)	Etudes (1982)

Heart & Soul is an album of duets by bassist Ron Carter and pianist Cedar Walton that was recorded in 1981 and released on the Dutch Timeless label.

== Reception ==
Professional ratings
Review scores
Source	Rating
Allmusic	3/5 stars

Allmusic awarded the album 3 stars, stating: "Heart & Soul is certainly not a loose 'blowing session'; it's clear that the duo's repertoire had carefully developed during a year of gigging together in Manhattan. At the same time, the music never feels overarranged and stiff; there is always room for spontaneity.... Recommended."

== Track listing ==
All compositions by Ron Carter except as indicated

1. "Heart and Soul" (Hoagy Carmichael, Frank Loesser) – 3:04
2. "Django" (John Lewis) – 5:35
3. "Frankie and Johnnie" (Traditional) – 4:59
4. "Little Waltz" – 6:38
5. "Telephone" – 3:16
6. "My Funny Valentine" (Lorenz Hart, Richard Rodgers) – 7:41
7. "Back to Bologna" (Cedar Walton) – 4:14
8. "A Beautiful Friendship" (Donald Kahn, Stanley Styne) – 4:59

== Personnel ==
- Cedar Walton – piano
- Ron Carter – bass
