= Pastels (album) =

Studio album by Ron Carter
- Released: 1976
- Recorded: October 18 & 19, 1976
- Studio: Fantasy Studios, Berkeley, California
- Genre: Hard bop, post-bop
- Length: 37:08
- Label: Milestone; M-9073
- Producer: Retrac

Ron Carter chronology
Yellow & Green (1976)	Pastels (1976)	Piccolo (1977)

Pastels is an album by bassist Ron Carter recorded at Fantasy Studios in California in 1976 and released on the Milestone label.

== Reception ==
The Allmusic review by Ron Wynn awarded the album 2½ stars saying "Some tremendous playing... though the strings get intrusive".

Professional ratings
Review scores
Source	Rating
Allmusic	2.5/5 stars
The Rolling Stone Jazz Record Guide	3/5 stars
The Penguin Guide to Jazz Recordings	3/4 stars

== Track listing ==
All compositions by Ron Carter

1. "Woolaphant" - 7:58
2. "Ballad" - 8:45
3. "One Bass Rag" - 7:28
4. "Pastels" - 6:21
5. "12 + 12" - 6:36

== Personnel ==
- Ron Carter - bass, piccolo bass, arranger
- Kenny Barron - piano (tracks 1 & 3–5)
- Hugh McCracken - electric guitar, acoustic guitar, harmonica (tracks 1 & 3–5)
- Harvey Mason - drums (tracks 1 & 3–5)
- Sanford Allen - concertmaster
- Virginia Baker, Myra Bucky, Fei-Pang Ching, Ronald Erickson, Daniel Kobialka, Roy Oakley Jr., Nathan Rubin, Emily Van Valkenburgh, Mark Volkert - violin
- Arthur Bauch, Denis DeCoteau, Daniel Yale - viola
- Garfield Moore, Kermit Moore, Melinda Ross - cello
- Don Sebesky - conductor, arranger
