= Patrão =

Studio album by Ron Carter
- Released: 1981
- Recorded: May 19– 20, 1980
- Studios: Van Gelder Studio, Englewood Cliffs, NJ
- Genre: Jazz
- Length: 37:25
- Labels: Milestone; M-9099
- Producer: A Retrac Production

Ron Carter chronology
New York Slick (1979)	Patrão (1981)	Parfait (1982)

Patrão is a 1981 album by Ron Carter.

Professional ratings
Review scores
Source	Rating
AllMusic	4/5 stars
The Penguin Guide to Jazz Recordings	3/4 stars

== Track listing ==
All compositions by Ron Carter.

1. "Ah Rio" – 8:13
2. "Nearly" – 9:43
3. "Tail Feathers" – 7:06
4. "Yours Truly" – 5:16
5. "Third Plane" – 7:07

== Personnel ==
- Ron Carter – bass
- Chet Baker – trumpet, flugelhorn
- Aloisio Aguiar (tracks 1 & 5), Kenny Barron – piano
- Amaury Tristão – guitar (tracks 1 & 5)
- Jack DeJohnette (tracks 2–4), Edison Machado (tracks 1 & 5) – drums
- Naná Vasconcelos – percussion (tracks 1 & 5)
