= Eight Plus =

Studio album by The Ron Carter Nonet
- Released: 1990
- Recorded: April 9 & 11, 1990
- Studio: Van Gelder Studio, Englewood Cliffs, NJ
- Genre: Jazz
- Length: 54:26
- Label: Victor; VICJ-35
- Producer: Ron Carter

Ron Carter chronology
Now's the Time (1990)	Eight Plus (1990)	Panamanhattan (1990)

Eight Plus is an album by bassist Ron Carter's Nonet recorded in 1990 and originally released on the Japanese Victor label.

== Reception ==
Professional ratings
Review scores
Source	Rating
AllMusic	3/5 stars

The AllMusic review by Rick Anderson observed "On this album he heads a fairly standard quintet that features two significant innovations: Carter himself plays a half-size piccolo bass and the quintet is further augmented by three cellists. Is the experiment a success? For the most part, yes. ... The cellos are a nice touch, and their chordal accompaniments give Carter's compositions an unusual and pleasing texture". On All About Jazz, Mark F. Turner stated "Mr. Carter adds a twist by featuring his skills on the piccolo bass. Combine a quartet of cellos with a horn-less jazz quintet, and the compositions stretch far beyond the typical jazz environment ... For a Nonet recording of a slightly different breed, Eight Plus is worth a listen" while C. Michael Bailey said "The music sounds like hip chamber music. The cellos are not so much plush in their effect as they are percussive and rhythmic. They do provide a dense fullness to the music ... This disc is an acquired taste, but like fine Scotch whiskey, it's a taste that is more than worth developing".

== Track listing ==
All compositions by Ron Carter except where noted

1. "Eight" – 7:45
2. "A Blues for Bradley" – 7:45
3. "Little Waltz" – 9:30
4. "O.K." – 5:13
5. "A Song for You" (Leon Russell) – 8:04
6. "First Trip" – 5:07
7. "El Rompe Cabeza" – 9:03
8. "Just a Closer Walk with Thee" (Traditional) – 1:57

== Personnel ==
- Ron Carter - piccolo bass
- Stephen Scott – piano
- Carol Buck, Kermit Moore, Chase Morrison, Rachael Steuermann – cello
- Leon Maleson – bass
- Lewis Nash – drums
- Steve Kroon – percussion
