= All Alone (Ron Carter album) =

Studio album by Ron Carter
- Released: 1988
- Recorded: March 29, 1988
- Studio: Van Gelder Studio, Englewood Cliffs, NJ
- Genre: Jazz
- Length: 56:15
- Label: EmArcy; 836 366
- Producer: Ron Carter, Kiyoshi Koyama

Ron Carter chronology
Very Well (1987)	All Alone (1988)	Something in Common (1989)

All Alone is a solo album by bassist Ron Carter recorded in 1988 and released on the EmArcy label.

== Reception ==
Professional ratings
Review scores
Source	Rating
AllMusic	3/5 stars

The AllMusic review by Ron Wynn called it a "Nice showcase for Carter's impeccable bass skills".

== Track listing ==
All compositions by Ron Carter except where noted

1. "D.B. Blues" – 7:36
2. "New York Standard Time" – 6:18
3. "Body and Soul" (Johnny Green, Edward Heyman, Frank Eyton, Robert Sour) – 8:12
4. "Tap, Tap, Tap" – 9:09
5. "The Same 12 Tones" – 5:50
6. "Two Hands Only" – 7:46

== Personnel ==
- Ron Carter - bass
