= The Bass and I =

Studio album by Ron Carter
- Released: May 21, 1997
- Recorded: January 14, 1997
- Studio: Van Gelder Studio, Englwood Cliffs, NJ
- Genre: Jazz
- Length: 54:22
- Label: Somethin' Else; TOCJ-5585
- Producer: Ron Carter

Ron Carter chronology
Brandenburg Concerto (1995)	The Bass and I (1997)	So What? (1998)

The Bass and I is an album by the bassist Ron Carter, recorded in 1997 and originally released on the Japanese Somethin' Else label with a US release on Blue Note Records.

== Reception ==
Professional ratings
Review scores
Source	Rating
AllMusic	4/5 stars
The Penguin Guide to Jazz Recordings	3/4 stars

The AllMusic review by Scott Yanow observed: "As is usual on Carter's records, he is the main soloist on many of the songs though Scott also has plenty of good spots". In JazzTimes, Fred Bouchard stated: "Forget the name, the title, the aura of legend. This is a decent little trio album by a primo rhythm section, with extra added percussion, without bass-clef sturm und drang. ... The set is slowed only by his limp compositions and lack of charts. Three standards and a jazz classic go well enough, and so does an original blues. But two nine-minute slow-loping sambas back to back, with an excess of vamping, hogtie the date".

== Track listing ==
All compositions by Ron Carter except where noted

1. "You and the Night and the Music" (Arthur Schwartz, Howard Dietz) – 5:36
2. "Someday My Prince Will Come" (Frank Churchill, Larry Morey) – 7:25
3. "Blues for D.P." – 6:19
4. "The Shadow of Your Smile" (Johnny Mandel, Paul Francis Webster) – 7:10
5. "Mr. Bow-Tie" – 9:12
6. "Double Bass" – 8:17
7. "I Remember Clifford" (Benny Golson) – 10:23

== Personnel ==
- Ron Carter - bass
- Stephen Scott – piano
- Lewis Nash – drums
- Steve Kroon – percussion
