= 1 + 3 =

Live album by Ron Carter
- Released: 1979
- Recorded: July 29, 1978
- Venues: Live Under the Sky, Denen Colosseum, Tokyo, Japan
- Genre: Jazz
- Length: 46:13
- Label: JVC
- Producer: Ed Michel

Ron Carter chronology
A Song for You (1978)	1 + 3 (1979)	Carnaval (1978)

1 + 3 is a live album by bassist Ron Carter which was recorded in Tokyo in 1978 and released on the Japanese JVC label the following year.

== Reception ==
Professional ratings
Review scores
Source	Rating
AllMusic	3/5 stars

The AllMusic review by Ron Wynn stated "Exactly the kind of impressive, high level playing and interaction you'd expect from this trio. ... While it's Carter's session, there's really no leader or followers, just three wonderful musicians fully attuned to each other".

== Track listing ==
All compositions by Ron Carter.

1. "Muffin" – 8:56
2. "Mr. T.W." – 14:01
3. "Doom" – 8:56
4. "New Song #3" – 12:20

== Personnel ==
- Ron Carter – double bass
- Herbie Hancock (tracks 3 & 4), Hank Jones (tracks 1 & 2) – piano
- Tony Williams – drums
