= So What? (Ron Carter album) =

Studio album by Ron Carter Trio
- Released: February 25, 1998
- Recorded: January 4, 1998
- Studio: Avatar (New York, New York)
- Genre: Jazz
- Length: 47:17
- Label: Somethin' Else; TOCJ-5594
- Producer: Ron Carter

Ron Carter chronology
The Bass and I (1997)	So What? (1998)	Orfeu (1999)

So What? is an album by bassist Ron Carter recorded in 1998 and originally released on the Japanese Somethin' Else label with a US release on Blue Note Records.

== Reception ==
Professional ratings
Review scores
Source	Rating
AllMusic	3.5/5 stars

The AllMusic review by Michael G. Nastos observed "Truly a team effort, this consistently well-played set should remind us all how brilliant these players are, especially with the cool Count Basie concept of "less is more" in mind".

== Track listing ==
All compositions by Ron Carter except where noted

1. "So What" (Miles Davis) – 6:47
2. "You'd Be So Nice to Come Home To" (Cole Porter) – 4:35
3. "It's About Time" – 5:14
4. "My Foolish Heart" (Victor Young, Ned Washington) – 8:15
5. "Hi-Fly" (Randy Weston) – 6:02
6. "3 More Days" – 7:35
7. "Eddie's Theme" – 3:54
8. "The Third Plane" – 4:55

== Personnel ==
- Ron Carter - bass
- Kenny Barron – piano
- Lewis Nash – drums
