= How Time Passes =

Studio album by Don Ellis
- Released: 1960
- Recorded: October 4 and 5, 1960; Nola Penthouse Studios, New York City
- Genre: Jazz
- Length: 45:16
- Label: Candid; CJM-8004/CJS-9004
- Producer: Nat Hentoff

Don Ellis chronology
How Time Passes (1960)	Out of Nowhere (1961)

How Time Passes is the debut album by trumpeter Don Ellis recorded in 1960 and released on the Candid label.

== Reception ==
Professional ratings
Review scores
Source	Rating
AllMusic	4.5/5 stars
Jazzwise	3/5 stars
The Penguin Guide to Jazz	3/4 stars

Scott Yanow of Allmusic states, "Trumpeter Don Ellis' initial recording as a leader (and first of four small group dates from the 1960-1962 period) found him stretching the boundaries of bop-based jazz and experimenting a bit with time and tempo... Although these musical experiments failed to be influential (Ellis himself went in a different direction a few years later), the unpredictable music is still quite interesting to hear". The Penguin Guide to Jazz award the album 3 stars.

== Track listing ==
All compositions by Don Ellis except as indicated

1. "How Time Passes" - 6:30
2. "Sallie" - 4:38
3. "A Simplex One" - 4:17
4. "Waste" (Jaki Byard) - 8:15
5. "Improvisational Suite #1" - 22:18

== Personnel ==
- Don Ellis - trumpet
- Jaki Byard - piano, alto saxophone
- Ron Carter - bass
- Charlie Persip - drums
