= All Blues (Ron Carter album) =

Studio album by Ron Carter
- Released: 1974
- Recorded: October 24, 1973
- Studio: Van Gelder Studio, Englewood Cliffs, NJ
- Genre: Jazz
- Length: 36:01
- Label: CTI
- Producer: Creed Taylor

Ron Carter chronology
Blues Farm (1973)	All Blues (1974)	Spanish Blue (1974)

All Blues is an album by bassist Ron Carter recorded at Van Gelder Studio in New Jersey in 1973 and released on the CTI label.

== Reception ==
The Allmusic review by Scott Yanow awarded the album 4½ stars, stating: "One of bassist Ron Carter's better albums as a leader... the quality of the solos is high, and this date lives up to one's expectations."

Professional ratings
Review scores
Source	Rating
Allmusic	4.5/5 stars
The Rolling Stone Jazz Record Guide	4/5 stars

== Track listing ==
All compositions by Ron Carter except as indicated

1. "A Feeling" - 3:23
2. "Light Blue" - 6:47
3. "117 Special" - 7:06
4. "Rufus" - 5:14
5. "All Blues" (Miles Davis) - 9:35
6. "Will You Still Be Mine" (Tom Adair, Matt Dennis) - 3:56
- Recorded at Van Gelder Studio in Englewood Cliffs, New Jersey, on October 24, 1973

== Personnel ==
- Ron Carter - bass, piccolo bass
- Joe Henderson - tenor saxophone (tracks 1 & 3–5)
- Roland Hanna - piano (tracks 1, 2, 4 & 5)
- Richard Tee - electric piano (track 3)
- Billy Cobham - drums, percussion (tracks 1–5)
