= Anything Goes (Ron Carter album) =

Studio album by Ron Carter
- Released: 1975
- Recorded: June–July 1975
- Studio: Van Gelder Studio, Englewood Cliffs, NJ
- Genre: Jazz
- Length: 33:30
- Label: Kudu
- Producer: Creed Taylor

Ron Carter chronology
Spanish Blue (1974)	Anything Goes (1975)	Yellow & Green (1976)

Anything Goes is an album by bassist Ron Carter recorded at Rudy Van Gelder's Studio in New Jersey in 1975 and released on the Kudu label.

== Reception ==
Professional ratings
Review scores
Source	Rating
Allmusic	2/5 stars
The Rolling Stone Jazz Record Guide	3/5 stars

Allmusic reviewer Thom Jurek states "Anything Goes is a studied and even delightful exercise in the commercial aspect of funky jazz fusion. More interested in extrapolated grooves and pretentious motherchopper riffs... Carter cut a record that was as easy to dance to as it was to admire for the quality of its playing... In all, this is a pumping little record, indicative of a forgotten era".

== Track listing ==
All compositions by Ron Carter except where noted.

1. "Anything Goes" (Cole Porter) – 5:24
2. "De Samba" – 5:49
3. "Baretta's Theme (Keep Your Eye on the Sparrow)" (Dave Grusin, Morgan Ames) – 5:06
4. "Can't Give You Anything (But My Love)" (Luigi Creatore, Hugo Peretti, George David Weiss) – 5:10
5. "Quarto Azul" – 6:55
6. "Big Fro" – 5:06
- Recorded at Van Gelder Studio in Englewood Cliffs, New Jersey in June and July 1975

== Personnel ==
- Ron Carter – bass, piccolo bass, arranger
- Randy Brecker – trumpet
- Alan Rubin – trumpet, flugelhorn
- Barry Rogers – trombone
- Michael Brecker – tenor saxophone
- Phil Woods – alto saxophone
- David Sanborn – alto saxophone
- Hubert Laws – flute
- Don Grolnick – electric piano
- Richard Tee – organ
- Eric Gale – electric guitar
- Steve Gadd (track 1), Jimmy Madison (tracks 2–6) – drums
- Ralph MacDonald – congas, percussion
- George Devens, Arthur Jenkins – percussion
- Patti Austin, Marilyn Jackson, Maeretha Stewart – vocals (tracks 1 & 6)
- Dave Matthews – arranger
