= Etudes (Ron Carter album) =

Studio album by Ron Carter
- Released: 1983
- Recorded: September 1982
- Studio: Van Gelder Studio, Englewood Cliffs, NJ
- Genre: Jazz
- Length: 35:51
- Label: Elektra/Musician; 60214-1
- Producer: Ron Carter

Ron Carter chronology
Heart & Soul (1981)	Etudes (1983)	Live at Village West (1982)

Etudes is an album by bassist Ron Carter Quintet which was recorded at Van Gelder Studio and released on the Elektra/Musician label in 1983.

== Reception ==
Professional ratings
Review scores
Source	Rating
AllMusic	3/5 stars

The AllMusic review by Ron Wynn stated "Sophisticated, elegant quartet date from 1982, with Art Farmer's serene trumpet and flugelhorn playing setting the tone, backed by tenor and soprano saxophonist Bill Evans, who's more restrained than usual. Carter's bass and Tony Williams' drums are both understated and definitive in their support and backing rhythms". Three of these musicians had major associations with Miles Davis: Carter and Williams from the "great quintet" of the 1960s and Evans from the then-contemporary Davis band.

== Track listing ==
All compositions by Ron Carter except where noted.

1. "Last Resort" – 7:29
2. "Bottoms Up" – 6:18
3. "Arboretum" (Tony Williams) – 4:31
4. "Rufus" – 5:12
5. "Echoes" – 4:10
6. "Doctor's Row" (Williams) – 8:11

== Personnel ==
- Ron Carter – bass
- Art Farmer – trumpet, flugelhorn
- Bill Evans – tenor saxophone, soprano saxophone
- Tony Williams – drums
