= New York Slick =

Studio album by Ron Carter
- Released: 1980
- Recorded: December 1979
- Studio: Van Gelder Studio, Englewood Cliffs, NJ
- Genre: Jazz
- Length: 35:39
- Label: Milestone; M-9096
- Producer: Ron Carter for Retrac Productions

Ron Carter chronology
Parade (1979)	New York Slick (1980)	Patrão (1980)

New York Slick is an album by bassist Ron Carter which was recorded at Van Gelder Studio in 1979 and released on the Milestone label the following year.

Professional ratings
Review scores
Source	Rating
AllMusic	4/5 stars
The Penguin Guide to Jazz Recordings	3/4 stars

== Track listing ==
All compositions by Ron Carter.

1. "NY Slick" – 4:04
2. "A Slight Smile" – 4:19
3. "Tierra Española" – 8:48
4. "Aromatic" – 8:53
5. "Alternate Route" – 9:35

== Personnel ==
- Ron Carter – bass
- Art Farmer – flugelhorn
- J. J. Johnson – trombone
- Hubert Laws – flute
- Kenny Barron – piano
- Billy Cobham – drums
- Jay Berliner – acoustic guitar (track 3)
- Ralph MacDonald – percussion (track 3)
