= Live at Village West =

Live album by Ron Carter and Jim Hall
- Released: 1984
- Recorded: November 1982
- Venue: Concord Pavilion, Concord, CA
- Genre: Jazz
- Length: 43:43
- Label: Concord Jazz; CJ-245
- Producer: Retrac Productions and Jim Hall

Ron Carter chronology
Etudes (1982)	Live at Village West (1984)	Telephone (1984)

Jim Hall chronology
Studio Trieste (1982)	Live at Village West (1982)	Telephone (1984)

Live at Village West is a live album by bassist Ron Carter and guitarist Jim Hall recorded in New York City in 1982 and released on the Concord Jazz label.

== Reception ==
Professional ratings
Review scores
Source	Rating
AllMusic	4.5/5 stars

The AllMusic review by Ken Dryden said "The second live collaboration between bassist Ron Carter and guitarist Jim Hall follows their first recording together by a decade, but their chemistry together is every bit as strong, if not improved ... Highly recommended".

== Track listing ==
1. "Bag's Groove" (Milt Jackson) – 4:11
2. "All the Things You Are" (Jerome Kern, Oscar Hammerstein II) – 5:38
3. "Blue Monk" (Thelonious Monk) – 5:07
4. "New Waltz" (Ron Carter) – 6:01
5. "St. Thomas" (Sonny Rollins) – 4:27
6. "Embraceable You" (George Gershwin, Ira Gershwin) – 6:37
7. "Laverne Walk" (Oscar Pettiford) – 5:13
8. "Baubles, Bangles, & Beads" (Robert Wright, George Forrest) – 5:02

== Personnel ==
- Ron Carter - bass
- Jim Hall – guitar
