= Now's the Time (Houston Person and Ron Carter album) =

Studio album by Houston Person and Ron Carter
- Released: 1990
- Recorded: January 6, 1990
- Studios: Van Gelder Studio, Englewood Cliffs, New Jersey
- Genre: Jazz
- Length: 48:25
- Label: Muse
- Producer: Houston Person

Houston Person chronology
The Party (1989)	Now's the Time (1990)	Just Friends (1992)

Ron Carter chronology
Something in Common (1990)	Now's the Time (1990)	Eight Plus (1990)

Professional ratings
Review scores
Source	Rating
AllMusic	4/5 stars

Now's the Time is an album by saxophonist Houston Person and bassist Ron Carter that was released by Muse in 1990.

== Track listing ==
1. "Bemsha Swing" (Thelonious Monk, Denzil Best) – 5:25
2. "Spring Can Really Hang You Up the Most" (Tommy Wolf, Fran Landesman) – 5:09
3. "Einbahnstrasse" (Ron Carter) – 5:03
4. "Memories of You" (Eubie Blake, Andy Razaf) – 4:55
5. "Quiet Nights" (Antônio Carlos Jobim) – 6:47
6. "If You Could See Me Now" (Tadd Dameron, Carl Sigman) – 6:38
7. "Now's the Time" (Charlie Parker) – 3:50
8. "Since I Fell for You" (Buddy Johnson) – 7:11
9. "Little Waltz" (Carter) – 3:35

== Personnel ==
- Houston Person – tenor saxophone
- Ron Carter – double bass
