= Something in Common (Houston Person and Ron Carter album) =

Studio album by Houston Person and Ron Carter
- Released: 1990
- Recorded: February 23, 1989
- Studios: Van Gelder Studio, Englewood Cliffs, New Jersey
- Genre: Jazz
- Length: 51:19
- Label: Muse
- Producers: Houston Person, Ron Carter

Houston Person chronology
Basics (1987)	Something in Common (1990)	The Party (1989)

Ron Carter chronology
Duets (1989)	Something in Common (1990)	Now's the Time (1990)

Something in Common is an album by saxophonist Houston Person and bassist Ron Carter that was released by Muse in 1989.

== Reception ==
Professional ratings
Review scores
Source	Rating
AllMusic	4/5 stars

At AllMusic Scott Yanow noted, "Houston Person is one of the last in a long line of thick-toned tenors who display soul in every note they play while bassist Ron Carter's versatility is legendary (it seems as if he has spent half of his life in recording studios). Their duet CD, although not inevitable, works out quite well...the main attractions of this date are the instrumentation and the strong interplay between Person and Carter".

== Track listing ==
1. "Once in a While" (Michael Edwards, Bud Green) – 7:07
2. "Anthropology" (Dizzy Gillespie, Charlie Parker) – 6:02
3. "Blues for Two" (Valery Ponomarev) – 8:42
4. "Mack the Knife" (Kurt Weill, Bertolt Brecht) – 6:22
5. "Joy Spring" (Clifford Brown) – 5:37
6. "Blue Seven" (Sonny Rollins) – 5:57
7. "I Thought About You" (Jimmy Van Heusen, Johnny Mercer) – 3:48
8. "Good Morning Heartache" (Irene Higginbotham, Ervin Drake, and Dan Fisher) – 7:26

== Personnel ==
- Houston Person – tenor saxophone
- Ron Carter – double bass
