= Dancing in the Dark (Rob Schneiderman album) =

Studio album by Rob Schneiderman
- Released: February 10, 1998
- Recorded: May 28, 1997
- Studio: Van Gelder Studio, Englewood Cliffs, NJ
- Genre: Jazz
- Length: 1:08:08
- Label: Reservoir; RSR CD 152
- Producer: Mark Feldman

Rob Schneiderman chronology
Keepin' in the Groove (1996)	Dancing in the Dark (1998)	Edgewise (2001)

Dancing in the Dark is the seventh studio album led by jazz pianist and mathematician Rob Schneiderman, released on the Reservoir label in 1998.

== Reception ==
Professional ratings
Review scores
Source	Rating
AllMusic	3/5 stars
The Penguin Guide to Jazz Recordings	3.5/4 stars

In his review on AllMusic, Michael G. Nastos stated "For his seventh Reservoir disc, pianist Schneiderman has assembled a quintet that takes on a distinct Jazz Messengers persona. Trumpeter Brian Lynch and baritone saxophonist Gary Smulyan supply a rich wellspring of swing and flowing ideas, while bassist Rufus Reid and drummer Billy Hart simply cannot be topped in their rhythmic supremacy.

== Track listing ==
No.	Title	Writer(s)	Length
1.	"Late Breakthrough"	Rob Schneiderman	8:45
2.	"Broken Dreams"	Rob Schneiderman	11:12
3.	"Dancing in the Dark"	Howard Dietz, Arthur Schwartz	6:35
4.	"Oval Essence"	Rob Schneiderman	8:00
5.	"Early Evening"	Rob Schneiderman	5:55
6.	"I Hear a Rhapsody"	Jack Baker, George Fragos, Dick Gasparre	8:58
7.	"Have You Heard?"	Rob Schneiderman	6:29
8.	"Oblivious"	Rob Schneiderman	12:14
Total length:			1:08:08

Track listing adapted from AllMusic.

== Credits ==
- Billy Hart - Drums
- Brian Lynch - Trumpet
- Rufus Reid - Bass
- Rob Schneiderman - Piano
- Gary Smulyan – Baritone Saxophone
- B. Robert Johnson - Design, Photography
- Rudy Van Gelder - Engineer [Recording]
- Maureen Sickler - Engineer [Assistant]
- Kayla Feldman - Executive-Producer
- Zan Stewart - Liner notes
- Abigail Feldman - Cover Photography
- Mark Feldman - Producer
