= Keepin' in the Groove =

Studio album by Rob Schneiderman
- Released: September 17, 1996
- Recorded: January 9, 1996
- Studio: Van Gelder Studio, Englewood Cliffs, NJ
- Genre: Jazz
- Length: 1:00:26
- Label: Reservoir; RSR CD 144
- Producer: Mark Feldman

Rob Schneiderman chronology
Dark Blue (1994)	Keepin' in the Groove (1996)	Dancing in the Dark (1998)

Keepin' in the Groove is the sixth studio album led by jazz pianist and mathematician Rob Schneiderman, released on the Reservoir label in 1996.

== Reception ==
Professional ratings
Review scores
Source	Rating
AllMusic	3/5 stars
MusicHound Jazz	5/5 stars
The Penguin Guide to Jazz Recordings	3.5/4 stars

In his review on Jazz Times, Jack Sohmer stated "Were it not so well recorded and its date and personnel not indicated on the tray back it would be easy to believe that this session by pianist Schneiderman, bassist Rufus Reid, and drummer Akira Tana was discovered on an unissued tape from the mid-1950s. Indeed, the impression sustained throughout this date is that of a Bud Powell-inspired pianist playing his heart out in a small, unpretentious jazz club to the backing of a swinging rhythm team.

== Track listing ==
No.	Title	Writer(s)	Length
1.	"Keepin' in the Groove"	Bud Powell	7:58
2.	"Four"	Miles Davis	6:46
3.	"On a Misty Night"	Tadd Dameron	6:48
4.	"Tugboat"	Rob Schneiderman	7:48
5.	"Daahoud"	Clifford Brown	6:10
6.	"This Is for Albert"	Wayne Shorter	6:44
7.	"Caravan"	Duke Ellington, Irving Mills, Juan Tizol	5:05
8.	"Bebop"	Dizzy Gillespie	7:10
9.	"Deacceleration"	Eddie Harris	5:57
Total length:			01:00:26

Track listing adapted from AllMusic.

== Credits ==
- Rufus Reid - Bass
- Akira Tana - Drums
- Rob Schneiderman - Piano, Liner notes
- B. Robert Johnson - Design, Photography
- Rudy Van Gelder - Engineer [Recording]
- Kayla Feldman - Executive-Producer
- Mark Feldman - Producer
