= Kayoko Miyama =

- Born: Tachikawa, Tokyo, Japan
- Genres: Jazz
- Occupations: Vocalist, voice performer
- Labels: Sound Hills Records, Roving Spirits, Sukaracan Label
- Website: http://www.kayokomiyama.com/

Kayoko Miyama (Japanese: ミヤマ カヨコ; formerly 美山夏蓉子) is a Japanese jazz vocalist and voice performer.

== Career ==
Miyama was born in Tachikawa, Tokyo. She began performing professionally while studying at Waseda University.

In 1995, Miyama recorded in New York with Akira Tana, Rufus Reid, Mark Soskin, Mark Turner and Craig Bailey. The recording was released in 1996 as her first album, Best Regards, on Sound Hills Records. The Jazz Discography Project lists the session as a Sound Hills recording made on 29 and 30 September 1995 at Steve Davis Studio in Yonkers, New York, with Miyama, Mark Soskin, Rufus Reid, Akira Tana, Craig Bailey and Mark Turner.

In 1996, Miyama received the Encouragement Award at the 12th Tsumura Jazz Vocal Awards.

In 2007, she released Circle Step, a duo album with pianist Dairo Suga, on Roving Spirits. Miyama described the album as the starting point for her subsequent work, stating that she thereafter sought to try something new with each CD she produced. She went on to release Obiyabiya (2009), directed by Fumio Yasuda, and ポッペンを吹く女 (2010). In its review of Obiyabiya, CDJournal noted Miyama's wordplay-based scat singing and chorus work, as well as her collaboration with Yasuda on piano, describing the album as creating distinctive musical spaces. Later releases included Rinra Rinra Miyama (2013) and Amazing Kayoko Miyama / At Last (2016).

In 2017, Miyama founded Sukaracan Label, through which she released later albums including Sukkarakan no Kan, Okubo Biyori, and the Ba series.

== Discography ==
- Best Regards (1996, Sound Hills Records)
- Circle Step (2007, Roving Spirits, RKCJ-2033)
- Obiyabiya (2009, Roving Spirits, RKCJ-2039)
- ポッペンを吹く女 (2010, Roving Spirits, RKCJ-2043)
- Rinra Rinra Miyama (2013, Roving Spirits, RKCJ-2049)
- Amazing Kayoko Miyama / At Last (2016, Roving Spirits, RKCJ-2062)
- Sukkarakan no Kan (2017, Sukaracan Label, KMAG-0023)
- Okubo Biyori (2018, Sukaracan Label, KMAG-0024)
- Ba no 5 (2021, Sukaracan Label, KMAG-0025)
- Miyama Gaiden: Standard no Maki (2022, Sukaracan Label, KMAG-0026)
- Ba no 7: Hagure Funky (2022, Sukaracan Label, KMAG-0027)
- Ba no ∞ (2022, Sukaracan Label, KMAG-0028)
- Megaten (2025, as You Luck \)

== Awards ==
- 1996 – Encouragement Award, 12th Tsumura Jazz Vocal Awards
