= Tone Twister =

Studio album by Rob Schneiderman
- Released: September 28, 2017
- Recorded: July 2015
- Studio: Avatar (New York, New York)
- Genre: Jazz
- Length: 1:21:44
- Label: Hollistic MusicWorks; HMW 16
- Producer: Brian Lynch, Rob Schneiderman

Rob Schneiderman chronology
Glass Enclosure (2008)	Tone Twister (2017)

Tone Twister is the eleventh album led by jazz pianist Rob Schneiderman, and the first in nearly a decade. Tone Twister was recorded in June 2015, and released on the Hollistic MusicWorks label on September 28, 2017.

== Reception ==
Professional ratings
Review scores
Source	Rating
DownBeat	3.5/5 stars

In his review on DownBeat, Jeff Potter stated "Throughout his sideman stints with notables such as James Moody, J. J. Johnson, Art Farmer and Eddie Harris, his tenure in the band TanaReid and his 10 previous discs as a leader, pianist Rob Schneiderman has shown a straightahead heart marked by lyricism and no-nonsense taste."

== Track listing ==
All compositions by Rob Schneiderman except where noted

1. Footloose Freestyle - 7:52
2. Unforgettable (Irving Gordon) - 6:54
3. Left Coast Lullaby - 6:33
4. Distant Memory - 5:14
5. Slapdance-Tapstick - 7:30
6. Windblown - 5:44
7. Tone Twister - 4:25
8. Tailspin - 7:07
9. The Lion's Tale - 8:36
10. Unforgettable/Distant Memory (Bonus Track) - 11:20
11. Windblown Tailspin (Bonus Track) - 09:50

== Credits ==
- Bass – Gerald L. Cannon
- Drums – Pete Van Nostrand
- Engineer – Tyler McDiarmid
- Mastered By – Katsuhiko Naito
- Piano, Arranged By, Liner Notes – Rob Schneiderman
- Tenor Saxophone – Ralph Moore (2)
- Trumpet, Mixed By – Brian Lynch
- Written-By – Rob Schneiderman (tracks: 1, 3 to 9)
