= Standards (Rob Schneiderman album) =

Studio album by Rob Schneiderman
- Released: 1993
- Recorded: August 26, 1992
- Studio: Van Gelder Studio, Englewood Cliffs, NJ
- Genre: Jazz
- Length: 1:04:57
- Label: Reservoir; RSR CD 126
- Producer: Mark Feldman

Rob Schneiderman chronology
Radio Waves (1991)	Standards (1993)	Dark Blue (1994)

Standards is the fourth album led by jazz pianist and mathematician Rob Schneiderman, released on the Reservoir label in 1993.

== Reception ==
Professional ratings
Review scores
Source	Rating
AllMusic	4/5 stars
The Penguin Guide to Jazz Recordings	3/4 stars

In his review on AllMusic, Ken Dryden stated "Rob Schneiderman has made a series of recordings for Reservoir in addition to being a jazz educator and math professor (the latter career well after this 1992 session). With bassist Rufus Reid and drummer Ben Riley providing a veteran rhythm section, the pianist focuses on standards, including more than a few that had fallen by the wayside by the 1990s. Schneiderman's exuberant take of Vincent Young's showcases both Reid and Riley's tasty brushwork. The pianist opens "So in Love" unaccompanied then switches gears into a breezy post-bop setting suggestive of the late James Williams, who like Reid and Schneiderman both taught at William Paterson University. The leader's deliberate setting of "I Should Care" emphasizes its melancholy mood, seasoned with his rich chord voicings. The leader adds a playful bop vamp in his waltzing treatment of "Fly Me to the Moon." The South American ballad "Disritmia" may not yet be a standard in North America, but Schneiderman's sensuous arrangement help it fit right in with the bevy of decades-old standards on this fine date."

== Track listing ==
All compositions by Rob Schneiderman except where noted

1. "Love Letters" (Edward Heyman, Victor Young) – 7:38
2. "So in Love" (Cole Porter) – 8:19
3. "On a Slow Boat to China" (Frank Loesser) – 5:13
4. "Without a Song" (Edward Eliscu, Billy Rose, Vincent Youmans) – 8:55
5. "I Should Care" (Sammy Cahn, Axel Stordahl, Paul Weston) – 5:15
6. "Fly Me to the Moon" (Bart Howard) – 6:05
7. "Disritmia" – 7:29
8. "With a Song in My Heart" (Lorenz Hart, Richard Rodgers) – 6:06
9. "When You Wish Upon a Star" (Leigh Harline, Ned Washington) – 4:45
10. "No One Else But You" (Don Redman) – 4:47

== Personnel ==
- Bass – Rufus Reid
- Drums – Ben Riley
- Piano – Rob Schneiderman
- Producer – Mark Feldman
- Recorded by Rudy Van Gelder
