= Dark Blue (album) =

Studio album by Rob Schneiderman
- Released: 1994
- Recorded: May 17, 1994
- Studio: Van Gelder Studio, Englewood Cliffs, NJ
- Genre: Jazz
- Length: 59:26
- Label: Reservoir; RSR CD 132
- Producer: Mark Feldman

Rob Schneiderman chronology
Standards (1993)	Dark Blue (1994)	Keepin' in the Groove (1996)

Dark Blue is the fifth album led by jazz pianist and mathematician Rob Schneiderman, released on the Reservoir label in 1994.

== Reception ==
Professional ratings
Review scores
Source	Rating
AllMusic	4/5 stars
MusicHound Jazz	5/5 stars
The Penguin Guide to Jazz Recordings	3/4 stars

In his review on AllMusic, Michael G. Nastos stated "Mainstream, straight-ahead, well-played jazz is alive and well, courtesy of pianist Rob Schneiderman and his very fine quintet of Ralph Moore (tenor sax), Brian Lynch (trumpet), Peter Washington (bass), and Lewis Nash (drums). They collectively coax and conjure the feeling of the 1950s' Blue Note-Riverside hard-to-post bop sound that remains timeless and forever swinging. The leader wrote five of these nine selections with this era in mind, while also recognizing that being a modernist doesn't necessarily mean throwing traditions overboard."

== Track listing ==
All compositions by Rob Schneiderman except where noted

1. "Dark Blue" - 5:41
2. "The Touch of Your Lips" (Ray Noble) - 7:57
3. "The Lion's Mane" - 8:09
4. "Silent Conversation" - 4:19
5. "Smoke Screen" (Brian Lynch) - 8:56
6. "East Bay Blues" - 6:14
7. "This Love of Mine" (Henry W. Sanicola, Jr., Sol Parker, Frank Sinatra) - 4:57
8. "People Will Say We're in Love" (Richard Rodgers, Oscar Hammerstein II) - 6:06
9. "City Limits" - 7:07

== Credits ==
- Rob Schneiderman - piano
- Brian Lynch - trumpet
- Ralph Moore - tenor and soprano saxophone
- Peter Washington - bass
- Lewis Nash - drums
