= Benny Green (pianist) =

American hard bop jazz pianist

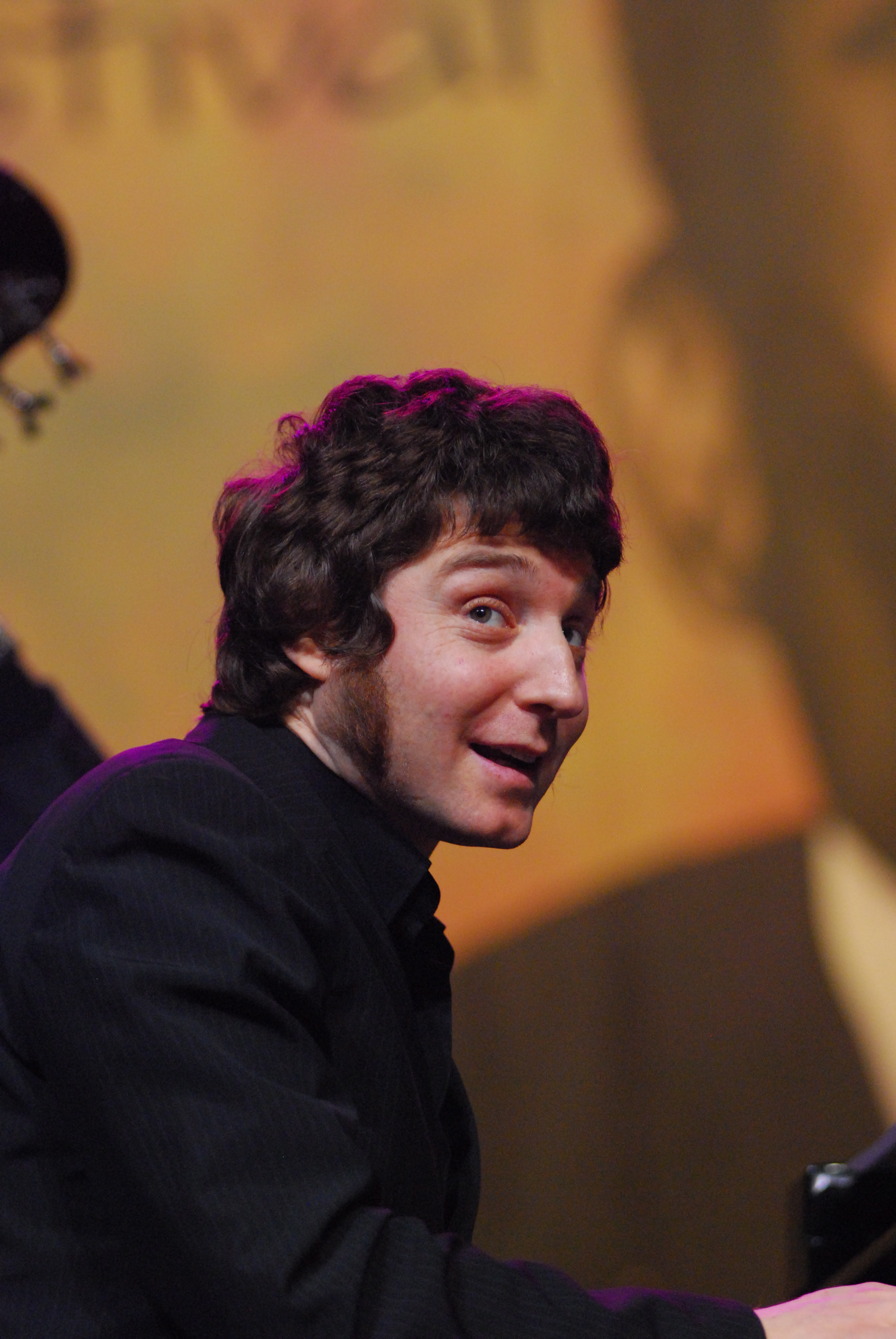
- Photo by John Dugan

Background information
- Born: April 4, 1963 (age 63); New York City, New York, U.S.
- Genre: Jazz
- Occupation: Musician
- Instrument: Piano
- Labels: Criss Cross, Blue Note, Telarc, Sunnyside
- Spouse: Sophy Anzueta Green (married 2023-present)
- Website: bennygreenmusic.com

Benny Green (born April 4, 1963) is an American hard bop jazz pianist who was a member of Art Blakey's Jazz Messengers. He has been compared to Bud Powell and Oscar Peterson in style and counts them as influences.

== Biography ==
Green was born in New York City. He grew up in Berkeley, California, and studied classical piano from the age of seven. He was also interested in jazz from an early point, as his father was a jazz tenor saxophone player. Benny Green was "discovered" by Faye Carroll, and while still in his teens worked in a quintet led by Eddie Henderson. Green attended Berkeley High School, and participated in the school's jazz ensemble. In the later years of his high school career, he had a weekly trio gig at Yoshi's, which was his entrance to the world of professional jazz. After high school, he spent time in San Francisco, but became more successful on his return to New York.

Green joined Betty Carter's band in April, 1983, and since 1991 he has led his own trio. He has recorded for Blue Note, Telarc, and Criss Cross.

Green frequently teaches in workshops across the United States, such as Jazz Camp West in California, and Centrum/Jazz Port Townsend in Washington. He also was the guest artist of the Fine Art Center jazz program for 2024-2025 school year.He currently resides in the United States and tours globally with his trio. Then and Now is a studio album recorded and released in 2018 by Sunnyside Records.

== Discography ==
=== As leader ===
Year recorded	Title	Label	Personnel/Notes
1988	Prelude	Criss Cross	Quintet, with Terence Blanchard (trumpet), Javon Jackson (tenor sax), Peter Washington (bass), Tony Reedus (drums)
1988–89	In This Direction	Criss Cross	Trio, with Buster Williams (bass), Lewis Nash (drums)
1990	Lineage	Blue Note	Trio, with Ray Drummond (bass), Victor Lewis (drums)
1991	Greens	Blue Note	Trio, with Christian McBride (bass), Carl Allen (drums)
1991	Testifyin'!: Live at the Village Vanguard	Blue Note	Trio, with Christian McBride (bass), Carl Allen (drums); in concert
1992	That's Right!	Blue Note	Trio, with Christian McBride (bass), Carl Allen (drums)
1994	The Place to Be	Blue Note	Some tracks solo piano; some tracks trio, with Christian McBride (bass), Kenny Washington (drums); some tracks nonet, with Byron Stripling (trumpet), Delfeayo Marsalis (trombone), John Clark (French horn), Herb Besson (tuba), Jerry Dodgion (flute, alto flute, alto sax), Gary Smulyan (baritone sax) added
1996	Kaleidoscope	Blue Note	With Stanley Turrentine (tenor sax), Antonio Hart (alto sax), Russell Malone (guitar), Ron Carter (bass), Lewis Nash (drums)
1997	Oscar and Benny	Telarc	Quartet, with Oscar Peterson (piano), Ray Brown (bass), Gregory Hutchinson (drums)
1999	These Are Soulful Days	Blue Note	Trio, with Russell Malone (guitar), Christian McBride (bass)
2000	Naturally	Telarc	Trio, with Russell Malone (guitar), Christian McBride (bass)
2001	Green's Blues	Telarc	Solo piano
2002	Jazz at the Bistro	Telarc	Duo, with Russell Malone (guitar); in concert
2003	Bluebird	Telarc	Duo, with Russell Malone (guitar)
2011?	Source	Jazz Legacy	
2013?	Magic Beans	Sunnyside	Trio, with Peter Washington (bass), Kenny Washington (drums)
2013	Live in Santa Cruz!	Sunnyside	Trio, with David Wong (bass), Kenny Washington (drums); in concert
2016	Happiness! Live at Kuumbwa	Sunnyside	Trio, with David Wong (bass), Rodney Green (drums); in concert
2018	Then and Now	Sunnyside	Some tracks trio, with David Wong (bass), Kenny Washington (drums); one track quartet, with Anne Drummond (flute, alto flute) added; two tracks quintet, with Drummond, Josh Jones (percussion) added; four tracks quartet, with Veronica Swift (vocals) added
2020	Benny's Crib	Sunnyside	Green plays the Fender Rhodes electric piano on all 11 tracks, with acoustic piano added on two. David Wong (bass), Aaron Kimmel (drums), Anne Drummond (flute), Josh Jones (congas). Veronica Swift performs vocals on "Benny's Crib".
2022	Solo	Sunnyside	Solo piano
2026	Renovation	Sunnyside	

Main sources:

=== As sideman ===
With Art Blakey

- Not Yet (Soul Note, 1988)
- I Get a Kick Out of Bu (Soul Note, 1988)

With Bob Belden

- Straight to My Heart: The Music of Sting (1989)
- When the Doves Cry: The Music of Prince (1993)

With Don Braden

- Quintet Time Is Now (1991)
- Wish List (1991)

With Cecil Brooks III

- Hangin' with Smooth (Muse, 1990)
- Our Mister Brooks (2000)

With Ray Brown

- Bass Face (1993)
- Don't Get Sassy (1994)
- Some of My Best Friends Are...The Piano Players (1994)
- Some of My Best Friends Are...The Sax Players (1995)
- Seven Steps to Heaven (1995)
- Live at Scullers Jazz Club (1996)
- SuperBass (1997)
- Triple Play (compilation) (1998)
- Walk On (2003)

With Arnett Cobb

- Tenor Tribute, Vol. 1 (1988)
- Tenor Tribute, Vol. 2 (1988)

With Freddie Hubbard

- Topsy - Standard Book (1989)
- Live at Fat Tuesday's (1991)
- God Bless the Child (1998)

With Etta Jones

- Reverse the Charges (Muse, 1992)
- At Last (Muse, 1995)
- My Gentleman Friend (Muse, 1994 [1996])

With Ralph Moore

- Round Trip (Reservoir, 1985 [1987])
- Images (Landmark, 1989)
- Furthermore (Landmark, 1990)
- Who It is You Are (1993)

With Houston Person

- The Lion and His Pride (Muse, 1991 [1994])
- Christmas with Houston Person and Friends (Muse, 1994)
- A Little Houston on the Side (1999)

With Jimmy Ponder

- Soul Eyes (1991)
- Steel City Soul (1998)

With Jim Snidero

- Mixed Bag (1987)
- Blue Afternoon (1989)
- While You Were Here (1991)

With Lew Tabackin

- Ill Be Seeing You (1992)
- What a Little Moonlight Can Do (1994)

With Jack Walrath

- Out of the Tradition (Muse, 1990 [1992])
- I Am the Walrath (2000)

With others

- Gary Bartz Shadows (1991)
- Block 16 Morning Sun Remixed (2002)
- Betty Carter Look What I Got! (1988)
- Anat Cohen Clarinetwork: Live at the Village Vanguard (2010)
- Mark Elf Minor Scramble (1996)
- Larry Gales Message from Monk (1990)
- Tim Hagans Hub Songs: The Music of Freddie... (1997)
- Jay Hoggard Little Tiger (1990)
- Fred Horn Steady Freddy Collective Cuts (1995)
- Jazz Futures Live in Concert (1991)
- Milt Jackson Burnin in the Woodhouse (1995)
- Ron Jackson Guitar Thing (1991)
- Randy Johnston, Walk On (Muse, 1992)
- Vince Jones One Day Spent (1991)
- Kristin Korb Introducing Kristin Korb With the... (1996)
- Diana Krall All for You (1995)
- Michael Logan Night Out (1990)
- Brian Lynch In Process (1991)
- Mingus Dynasty Next Generation Performs Charles... (1991)
- Mark Murphy Dim the Lights (2004)
- Amani A. W. Murray Amani A. W. Murray (1990)
- Randy Napoleon Between Friends (2006)
- Oscar Peterson Oscar Peterson & Benny Green (1998)
- Flip Phillips Swing Is the Thing! (2000)
- John Pizzarelli Dear Mr. Cole (1994)
- Lisa Pollard I See Your Face Before Me (1993)
- Clark Terry One on One (2000)
- Steve Turre Right There (1991)
- Belinda Underwood Greenspace (2008)
- Bobby Watson Inventor (1989)
