= Llegó La India Via Eddie Palmieri =

Studio album by La India
- Released: September 8, 1992
- Genre: Salsa
- Labels: Soho Sounds; Acid Jazz
- Producers: Eddie Palmieri; Little Louie Vega

La India chronology
Breaking Night (1990)	Llegó La India Via Eddie Palmieri (1992)	Dicen Que Soy (1994)

Alternative cover
- 1993 release on Acid Jazz Records

Llegó La India Via Eddie Palmieri (La India Has Arrived Via Eddie Palmieri) is a salsa album by Puerto Rican-American singer La India in collaboration with pianist Eddie Palmieri. It was released in the US by Soho Sounds in 1992 and features songs in Spanish and English. The album was released in the UK by Acid Jazz Records in 1993.

== Reception ==
Professional ratings
Review scores
Source	Rating
AllMusic	3.5/5 stars

AllMusic awarded the album 3.5 stars out of 5. The album peaked at number 5 on the US Tropical Albums chart. La India was subsequently nominated for a Premio Lo Nuestro award in 1993 in the Female Artist of the Year – Tropical/Salsa category. The album was named one of the 50 greatest salsa albums of all time by Rolling Stone Magazine in October 2024.

== Track listing ==
1. "Vivir Sín Ti" (Eddie Palmieri, arr. Eddie Palmieri) – 5:03
2. "Llegó La India" (Eddie Palmieri, arr. Eddie Palmieri) – 6:31
3. "Soledad" (India, Eddie Palmieri, Shirley Marte, Patrick Morales, arr. Eddie Palmieri and Nelson Jaime) – 4:36
4. "Mi Primera Rumba" (Eddie Palmieri, arr. Eddie Palmieri) – 5:39
5. "Yemaya Y Ochun (Prelude)" (Milton Cardona, arr. Milton Codona) – 2:16
6. "Yemaya Y Ochun" (Eddie Palmieri, arr. Eddie Palmieri) – 5:43
7. "Merengue Internacional" (Eddie Palmieri, arr. Eddie Palmieri and Nelson Jaime) – 5:49
8. "Solitude" (India, Eddie Palmieri, Shirley Marte, arr. Eddie Palmieri and Nelson Jaime) – 4:36
9. "I Wanna Dance" (India, Eddie Palmieri, Shirley Marte, arr. Eddie Palmieri and Nelson Jaime) – 4:31
10. "Soledad/Bi-Lingual Version" (India, Eddie Palmieri, Shirley Marte, Patrick Morales, arr. Eddie Palmieri and Nelson Jaime) – 6:20

== Charts ==
Chart (1992)	Peak position
US Tropical Albums (Billboard)	5

== Personnel ==
- La India – vocals
- Eddie Palmieri – piano, arranger, producer
- Johnny Torres – bass
- Charlie Sepúlveda – trumpet
- Barry Danielian – trumpet
- Nelson Jaime – trumpet
- Brian Lynch – trumpet
- Conrad Herwig – trombone
- David Sánchez – tenor saxophone
- José Claussell – percussion, timbales
- Jimmy Delgado – bongo, bells, timbales
- Milton Cardona – conga, shekere, iyá
- Theodore Holliday II – itotele
- Jesús Andújar – tambora
- Ricardo Mejía Carreras – guira
- Pete "Conde" Rodríguez – clave
- Pedro E. Rodríguez – maracas
- Johnny Torres, Milton Cardona, Pepe Conde Rodriquez, Pedro E. Rodríguez, India, Connie Harvey, Benny Diggs – chorus
