= The Place to Be (Benny Green album) =

Studio album by Benny Green
- Released: 1994
- Recorded: March 22–23, 1994
- Studio: Van Gelder Studio, Englewood Cliffs, NJ
- Genre: Jazz
- Length: 58:39
- Label: Blue Note
- Producer: Steven Schenfeld

Benny Green chronology
Blue Notes (1993)	The Place to Be (1994)	Kaleidoscope (1996)

The Place to Be is an album by pianist Benny Green which was recorded in 1994 and released on the Blue Note label.

== Reception ==
Professional ratings
Review scores
Source	Rating
AllMusic	4/5 stars

The AllMusic review by Scott Yanow stated: "Benny Green continued to show gradual growth throughout the 1990s. For this outing with his 1994 trio, Green shows off the influence of Oscar Peterson and other predecessors, but also displays his own musical voice during a mixture of originals, jazz standards and lesser-known tunes. ... Overall, this CD is an excellent example of Benny Green's playing and writing talents". On All About Jazz, William Grimm observed: "Benny Green is a consummate jazz pianist. He’s mastered all the past styles from Kansas City stride to Bill Evans to bebop and beyond and he’s taking the music to heights unknown. The Place To Be is just that, the place where everyone who appreciates great jazz will want to be".

== Track listing ==
All compositions by Benny Green, except where indicated.

1. "Nice Pants" – 5:58
2. "Playmate" – 2:30
3. "I Want to Talk About You" (Billy Eckstine) – 6:58
4. "The Place to Be" – 3:10
5. "I Felt That" – 5:12
6. "Pensativa" (Clare Fischer) – 6:15
7. "One of Another Kind" (Freddie Hubbard) – 5:55
8. "Which Came First?" – 5:22
9. "Noreen's Nocturne" (Oscar Peterson) – 3:28
10. "Concertina" – 7:13
11. "Gravy Waltz" (Steve Allen, Ray Brown) – 2:28
12. "The Folks Who Live on the Hill" (Jerome Kern, Oscar Hammerstein II) – 4:10

== Personnel ==
- Benny Green – piano
- Christian McBride – bass (tracks 1–3, 5–8, 10 & 12)
- Kenny Washington – drums (tracks 1–3, 5–7, 10 & 12)
- Byron Stripling – trumpet (tracks 1, 3 & 5)
- Delfeayo Marsalis – trombone (tracks 1, 3 & 5)
- John Clark – French horn (tracks 1, 3 & 5)
- Herb Besson – tuba (tracks 1, 3 & 5)
- Jerry Dodgion – flute, alto flute, alto saxophone (tracks 1, 3 & 5)
- Gary Smulyan – baritone saxophone(tracks 1, 3 & 5)
- Bob Belden – arranger (tracks 1, 3 & 5)
