= Edsel Gomez =

- Born: Edsel Robert Gomez Rentas; August 9, 1962 (age 64); Bayamon, Puerto Rico
- Genres: Jazz, Latin jazz
- Occupation: Musician
- Instrument: Piano
- Years active: 1975–present
- Label: Zoho Music
- Website: www.edselgomez.com

Edsel Gomez (born August 9, 1962) is a Puerto Rican jazz pianist. In 2007, he was nominated for a Grammy Award for the album Cubist Music. He arranged and directed Dee Dee Bridgewater's Grammy-winning recording Eleanora Fagan (1915-1959): To Billie with Love from Dee Dee Bridgewater. He has worked with Jack DeJohnette, Don Byron, Brian Lynch, and Eddie Palmieri.

After a research study promoted by the Philippine Heritage Library and Ayala Museum in Manila, Philippines, he began the Edsel Gomez World Fusion Band, which explores the fusion of Philippine traditional and tribal music with jazz and Afro Caribbean music.

== Discography ==
=== As leader ===
- "Celebrating Chico Buarque de Hollanda" (Mix House, 1999)
- América: Arismar Do Espírit O Santo (Lua, 2005)
- Cubist Music (Zoho Music, 2006)
- Road to Udaipur (Zoho Music, 2015)

=== As sideman ===
With Freddie Bryant

- 1999 Boogaloo Brasileiro
- 2000 Live at Smoke

With David Sánchez

- 1998 Obsession
- 2000 Melaza
- 2001 Travesía
- 2004 Coral

With Don Byron

- 1992 Tuskegee Experiments

 1995 " Music For Six Musicians"

- 2001 You Are #6: More Music for Six Musicians

With Richard Bona

- 1999 Scenes from My Life
- 2001 Reverence

With Conrad Herwig

- 2004 Another Kind of Blue: The Latin Side of Miles Davis
- 2004 Que Viva Coltrane
- 2006 Sketches of Spain y Mas: The Latin Side of Miles Davis

With Humberto Ramírez

- 1992 Jazz Project
- 2007 Humberto Ramírez Presents Smooth Latin Jazz
- 2008 Trompeta Tropical

With Dee Dee Bridgewater

- 2007 Red Earth
- 2010 Eleanora Fagan (1915-1959): To Billie with Love from Dee Dee Bridgewater
- 2011 Midnight Sun

With Tony Lujan

- 2001 You Don't Know What Love Is
- 2004 Tribute

With others

- 1992 Prodigios Delights, Prodigio
- 1994 Debutaste En Mi, Jorge Escobar
- 1999 A Day in the Life, Eric Benét
- 2001 Branching Out, William Cepeda and Afrorican Jazz
- 2001 Rite of Passage, Sunny Sumter
- 2002 Piñero, Kip Hanrahan
- 2003 Let's Go to the Rumba!, Rumbantela
- 2004 10 Anos, Arismar Do Espirito Santo
- 2004 El Hombre, Carlos "Patato" Valdes
- 2005 The Color of Things, Sandro Albert
- 2006 A Thousand Beautiful Things, Janis Siegel
- 2006 Simpatico, Eddie Palmieri, Brian Lynch
- 2007 Língua, Caetano Veloso
- 2007 Vision of Love, Christine Capdeville
- 2009 The Chick Corea Songbook, The Manhattan Transfer
- 2015 East Side Rio Drive, Nilson Matta
