= Edgewise (album) =

Studio album by Rob Schneiderman
- Released: January 30, 2001
- Recorded: July 9, 2000
- Studio: Avatar (New York, New York)
- Genre: Jazz
- Length: 1:07:18
- Label: Reservoir; RSR CD 165
- Producer: Mark Feldman

Rob Schneiderman chronology
Dancing in the Dark (1998)	Edgewise (2001)	Back in Town (2004)

Edgewise is the eighth album led by jazz pianist Rob Schneiderman, released on the Reservoir label in 2001.

== Reception ==
Professional ratings
Review scores
Source	Rating
AllMusic	3/5 stars
The Penguin Guide to Jazz Recordings	3.5/4 stars

In his review on All About Jazz, C. Andrew Hovan stated

Schneiderman’s art is one of understated elegance and over the course of his previous eight Reservoir sides he has evolved into a singular pianist of great merit. This new affair is simply a trio date with bassist Ray Drummond and drummer Winard Harper, although there’s nothing routine about the results.

In his review on Jazz Times, Miles Jordan opined

...Schneiderman’s playing won’t make us forget Powell but it’s nice to be reminded of him.

== Track listing ==
No.	Title	Writer(s)	Length
1.	"Cleopatra's Dream"	Bud Powell	7:00
2.	"Edgewise"	Rob Schneiderman	6:57
3.	"Just One of Those Things"	Cole Porter	7:05
4.	"I’ll Keep Loving You"	Bud Powell	5:27
5.	"What Is This Thing Called Love?"	Cole Porter	6:01
6.	"Bud Powell Boulevard"	Rob Schneiderman	7:46
7.	"In Walked Bud"	Thelonious Monk	5:31
8.	"Blue Pearl"	Bud Powell	7:04
9.	"Blues In The Closet"	Oscar Pettiford	7:02
10.	"I’ll Remember April"	Gene DePaul, Patricia Johnston, Don Raye	7:24
Total length:			1:07:18

Track listing adapted from AllMusic.

== Credits ==
- Ray Drummond - Bass
- B. Robert Johnson - Design, Photography
- Winard Harper, Drums
- Kayla Feldman - Executive Producer
- Allan Tucker - Mastereing
- Rob Schneiderman - Piano
- Mark Feldman - Producer
- Jim Anderson - Engineer [Recording]
- Ross Peterson - Engineer [Assistant]
- Andrew Gilbert, Liner notes (2)
