= Glass Enclosure (album) =

Studio album by Rob Schneiderman
- Released: May 20, 2008
- Recorded: July 14, 2007
- Studio: Avatar (New York, New York)
- Genre: Jazz
- Length: 61:54
- Label: Reservoir; RSR CD 193
- Producer: Mark Feldman

Rob Schneiderman chronology
Back in Town (2004)	Glass Enclosure (2008)	Tone Twister (2017)

Glass Enclosure is the tenth album led by jazz pianist Rob Schneiderman, released on the Reservoir label in 2008.

== Reception ==
Professional ratings
Review scores
Source	Rating
AllMusic	4/5 stars
DownBeat	3/5 stars

In his review on AllMusic, Ken Dryden opined "Schneiderman devours Bud Powell's dramatic "Glass Enclosure" whole, while his sense of humor comes across in an easygoing take of Charlie Parker's "Yardbird Suite" as he slyly inserts a low-key quote from the Latin tune "Tico Tico." In his review on DownBeat, Robert Doerschuk stated "Rob Schneiderman steers a straightahead course throughout Glass Enclosure... While everyone plays with a pleasing and relaxed authority, Schneiderman pushes a little further..."

== Track listing ==
No.	Title	Writer(s)	Length
1.	"Reunion"	Rob Schneiderman	5:24
2.	"Ready or Not"	Rob Schneiderman	6:21
3.	"Buster Rides Again"	Bud Powell	6:33
4.	"Embraceable You"	George Gershwin, Ira Gershwin	4:53
5.	"Glass Enclosure"	Bud Powell	6:22
6.	"Bluegenes"	Rob Schneiderman	7:33
7.	"Fine and Dandy"	Kay Swift, Paul James	4:45
8.	"Yardbird Suite"	Charlie Parker	6:13
9.	"Social Call"	Gigi Gryce	6:33
10.	"Cocktails for Two"	Arthur Johnston, Sam Coslow	7:12
Total length:			61:54

Track listing adapted from Discogs.

== Credits ==
- Charles McPherson - Alto Saxophone (tracks: 1 to 4, 7, 10)
- Todd Coolman - Bass
- B. Robert Johnson - Design, Photography
- Leroy Williams - Drums
- Brian Montgomery - Engineer [Assistant]
- Jim Anderson - Engineer [Recording]
- Rob Schneiderman - Liner Notes
- Allan Tucker - Mastereing
- Abigail Feldman - Photography
- Rob Schneiderman - Piano
- Mark Feldman - Producer
