= Rob Schneiderman (mathematician) =

American jazz pianist and mathematician

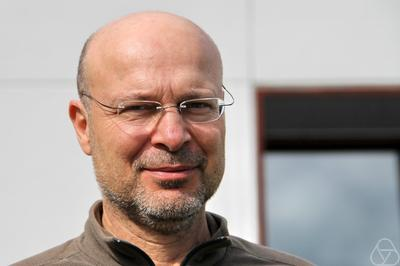
- Schneiderman at Oberwolfach 2014

Background information
- Born: Robert Roland Schneiderman; June 21, 1957 (age 69); Boston, Massachusetts, U.S.
- Genres: Jazz, bebop, hard bop, post-bop
- Occupations: Musician, educator, composer, mathematician
- Instrument: piano
- Years active: 1973–present
- Website: Official website
- Scientific career
- Education: City College of New York (B.A.); University of California, Berkeley (Ph.D.)
- Fields: Geometric topology
- Thesis: "4-Dimensional Intersection Numbers of Knots and Links in 3-Manifolds" (2001)
- Doctoral advisor: Robion Kirby

Robert Roland "Rob" Schneiderman (born June 21, 1957) is an American jazz pianist who also works as a professor of mathematics at Lehman College of the City University of New York, where he specializes in geometric topology.

== Music career ==
Schneiderman's professional jazz career began in San Diego from about age 16, when he played piano for visiting soloists such as Eddie Harris, Sonny Stitt, Harold Land, Charles McPherson and Peter Sprague. He continued to collaborate intermittently with Harris, until the latter's death in 1996, and with McPherson. In 1982, Schneiderman moved to New York, where he performed and toured with such musicians as J.J. Johnson, Chet Baker, Art Farmer, Clifford Jordan, James Moody and Zoot Sims. A performance fellowship from the National Endowment for the Arts in 1987 featured Schneiderman with George Coleman, Jimmy Heath, Claudio Roditi, and Slide Hampton. The collaboration with Slide Hampton resulted in his debut album New Outlook, the first of ten recordings to date as a leader for the Reservoir music label.

His most recent release, entitled Tone Twister, is a collaboration with Brian Lynch on trumpet and Ralph Moore on tenor saxophone. The album features Gerald L. Cannon on bass and Pete Van Nostrand on drums. Schneiderman has also played as sidemen for Billy Higgins, Rufus Reid, Brian Lynch, Ralph Moore, Peter Washington, Lewis Nash, Akira Tana, Billy Hart, Gary Smulyan and Ben Riley.

As a jazz educator, he has been in residence at the Stanford Jazz Workshop. He was previously an adjunct professor in the jazz departments of the William Paterson University (with Rufus Reid) and Queens College (with Jimmy Heath). He has also been on the faculty of the Jazzschool in Berkeley, California.

== Education and academic career ==
Schneiderman graduated with a B.A. in mathematics from City College of New York in 1994. He received his Ph.D. from University of California, Berkeley in 2001 under the supervision of Robion Kirby. In 2006, Schneiderman became an assistant professor at the Department of Mathematics Lehman College after stints at the University of California, San Diego, Courant Institute of Mathematical Sciences, New York University, and at the University of Pennsylvania. From 2013, he has been an associate professor at Lehman College. He has also served as chair of the Mathematics Department since 2019.

Schneiderman also actively works at the interface of music and mathematics.

== Discography ==
=== As Leader ===
Year	Title	Label	CD release(s)	Credit (if not Rob Schneiderman)
1988	New Outlook	Reservoir	Reservoir (City Hall), RSR CD 106, 2008	Composers: Cole Porter, Bud Powell, Alec Wilder
1990	Smooth Sailing	Reservoir	Reservoir (City Hall), RSR CD 114, 1994	Composers: Richard Rodgers, Lorenz Hart, Ernesto Lecuona, Forman Brown, Gus Kahn, Nacio Herb Brown, Harry Warren, Johnny Mercer
1991	Radio Waves	Reservoir (8 tracks)	Reservoir (City Hall), RSR CD 120, 2008	Composers: Lorenz Hart, Richard Rodgers
1992	Standards	Reservoir (10 tracks)	Reservoir (City Hall), RSR CD 126, 1993	Composers: Edward Heyman, Victor Young, Cole Porter, Frank Loesser, Edward Eliscu, Billy Rose, Vincent Youmans, Sammy Cahn, Axel Stordahl, Paul Weston, Bart Howard, Lorenz Hart, Richard Rodgers, Leigh Harline, Don Redman
1994	Dark Blue	Reservoir (8 tracks)	Reservoir (City Hall), RSR CD 132, 1994	Composers: Ray Noble, Brian Lynch, Henry W. Sanicola, Jr., Sol Parker, Frank Sinatra, Oscar Hammerstein II, Richard Rodgers
1996	Keepin' in the Groove	Reservoir (9 tracks)	Reservoir (City Hall), RSR CD 144, 1994	Composers: Clifford Brown, Tadd Dameron, Miles Davis, Duke Ellington, Dizzy Gillespie, Eddie Harris, Irving Mills, Wayne Shorter, Juan Tizol
1998	Dancing in the Dark	Reservoir (8 tracks)		Composers: Jack Baker, Howard Dietz, George Fragos, Dick Gasparre, Arthur Schwartz
2001	Edgewise	Reservoir (10 tracks)		Composers: Gene DePaul, Patricia Johnston, Thelonious Monk, Oscar Pettiford, Cole Porter, Bud Powell, Don Raye
2004	Back in Town	Reservoir (9 tracks)		Composers: Eden Ahbez, Johnny Burke, John Coltrane, Ray Evans, James Van Heusen, Antonio Carlos Jobim, Jay Livingston, Cole Porter, Sonny Rollins
2008	Glass Enclosure	Reservoir (10 tracks)		Composers: Bud Powell, Cole Porter, Kay Swift, Paul James, Charlie Parker, Gigi Gryce, Arthur Johnston, Sam Coslow
2017	Tone Twister	Hollistic MusicWorks HMW 16 (9 tracks)	Holistic Music Works, Digital Album (11 tracks)	Composers: Irving Gordon

=== As Sideman ===
with Eddie Harris

- 1983: Tale of Two Cities (Night Records)

with J.J. Johnson

- 1992: Vivian (Concord)

with Brian Lynch

- 2011: Unsung Heroes Vol. 1 (Hollistic MusicWorks)
- 2013: Unsung Heroes, Vol. 2 (CD Baby)

with Rufus Reid and Harold Land

- 1989: Corridor to the Limits (Sunnyside)

with Akira Tana and Rufus Reid

- 1991: Yours and Mine (Concord)
- 1992: Passing Thoughts (Concord)
- 1994: Blue Motion (Evidence)
