= Don't Get Sassy =

Studio album by Ray Brown
- Released: 1994
- Recorded: April 1994
- Studio: Signet
- Genre: Jazz
- Length: 63:00
- Label: Telarc
- Producer: Elaine Martone

Ray Brown chronology
Black Orpheus (1994)	Don't Get Sassy (1994)	Some of My Best Friends Are...The Piano Players (1994)

Don't Get Sassy is an album by the American bassist Ray Brown, released in 1994. It is credited to the Ray Brown Trio.

== Production ==
The album was recorded live in the studio, in April 1994. Benny Green played piano and Jeff Hamilton played drums. "Don't Get Sassy" was written by Thad Jones. "Tanga" was written by Mario Bauzá.

== Critical reception ==
Professional ratings
Review scores
Source	Rating
AllMusic	4/5 stars
The Encyclopedia of Popular Music	3/5 stars
MusicHound Jazz: The Essential Album Guide	4/5 stars
The Penguin Guide to Jazz on CD	3/4 stars

The Ottawa Citizen determined that "Brown seems content to recreate the sound of his years with Oscar Peterson's classic trio—but the communication between three strong technicians is enough to make this a satisfying listening experience." The Skanner deemed the album "a first-class recording by acknowledged first-class musicians."

The Toronto Star praised "The Good Life" and the title track. The Omaha World-Herald stated that the album "moves along in a solidly soulful groove." The Age noted that "no piano trio swings more easily, more jubilantly, than one led by bass boss Ray Brown."

AllMusic wrote that "the tight yet swinging arrangements are full of subtle surprises."

== Track listing ==
No.	Title	Length
1.	"Don't Get Sassy"
2.	"Everything I Love"
3.	"Kelly's Blues"
4.	"Tanga"
5.	"When You Go"
6.	"Brown's New Blues"
7.	"The Good Life"
8.	"Con Alma"
9.	"Ellington Medley: "Rain Check'"; "In a Sentimental Mood"; "Squatty Roo""
