= New Outlook =

Studio album by Rob Schneiderman
- Released: 1988
- Recorded: January 5, 1988
- Studio: Van Gelder Studio, Englewood Cliffs, NJ
- Genre: Jazz
- Length: 48:11
- Label: Reservoir
- Producer: Rob Schneiderman

Rob Schneiderman chronology
New Outlook (1988)	Smooth Sailing (1990)

New Outlook is the debut album by jazz pianist and mathematician Rob Schneiderman, recorded on January 5, 1988, and released by Reservoir Records.

== Reception ==
Professional ratings
Review scores
Source	Rating
AllMusic	3/5 stars
MusicHound Jazz	5/5 stars
The Penguin Guide to Jazz Recordings	2.5/4 stars

The album received a three-star rating by AllMusic

The authors of The Penguin Guide to Jazz Recordings noted that Slide Hampton's "mild-mannered fluency suits Schneiderman's approach," but stated that "the music tends to settle down into blandishments of the kind that have been committed to record many times before."

The editors of MusicHound Jazz awarded the album a full five stars, calling it "a stellar quartet session," and commenting: "Schneiderman composed four of the eight tunes, though he writes with such an ear for melody it's hard to tell his work from the standards."

== Track listing ==
All compositions by Rob Schneiderman except where noted

1. "New Outlook" – 9:22
2. "Time Waits" (Bud Powell) - 5:10
3. "Slippin' and Slidin" - 5:24
4. "Cedar" - 4:00 (Michael Formanek)
5. "While We're Young" (Alec Wilder) - 8:53
6. "I've Got You Under My Skin" (Cole Porter) - 5:15
7. "Hidden Dreams" - 3:53
8. "Here Today" - 6:14

== Personnel ==
- Rob Schneiderman – piano
- Slide Hampton – trombone
- Rufus Reid – bass
- Akira Tana – drums
