= Smooth Sailing (Rob Schneiderman album) =

Studio album by Rob Schneiderman
- Released: 1990
- Recorded: February 28, 1990
- Studio: Van Gelder Studio, Englewood Cliffs, NJ
- Genre: Jazz
- Length: 1:09:25
- Label: Reservoir; RSR CD 114
- Producer: Mark Feldman

Rob Schneiderman chronology
New Outlook (1988)	Smooth Sailing (1990)	Radio Waves (1991)

Smooth Sailing is the second album led by jazz pianist and mathematician Rob Schneiderman, released on the Reservoir label in 1990.

== Reception ==
Professional ratings
Review scores
Source	Rating
AllMusic	3/5 stars
MusicHound Jazz	4.5/5 stars
The Penguin Guide to Jazz Recordings	3/4 stars

The album received a three-star rating on AllMusic.

The authors of The Penguin Guide to Jazz Recordings suggested that Schneiderman "prefers the kind of knowing, grooving accompaniment that's second nature to Reid and Higgins," and called the album "a blithe mix of standards and new tunes."

The editors of MusicHound Jazz described the album as a "thoroughly enjoyable date," and stated: "Smooth Sailing... features the kind of trio a leader would kill for, players who listen closely and contribute constantly to shape the flow of the music."

== Track listing ==
All compositions by Rob Schneiderman except where noted

1. "Harlem Afternoon" - 6:56
2. "Lost and Found" - 8:22
3. "Rebound" - 7:05
4. "It Never Entered My Mind" (Richard Rodgers, Lorenz Hart) - 5:05
5. "Smooth Sailing" - 5:33
6. "Juvenesence" - 8:28
7. "Two Hearts That Pass in the Night" (Ernesto Lecuona, Forman Brown) - 5:03
8. "Sonhozinho" - 6:58
9. "You Stepped Out of a Dream" (Gus Kahn, Nacio Herb Brown) - 9:12
10. "Naughty but Nice" (Harry Warren, Johnny Mercer) - 6:43

== Credits ==
- Bass – Rufus Reid
- Drums – Billy Higgins
- Piano – Rob Schneiderman
- Produced by Mark Feldman
- Recorded by Rudy Van Gelder
- Written by Rob Schneiderman (tracks: 1, 2, 3, 5, 6, 8)
- Cover [Cover Engraving] – W.H. Bartlett
- Design – B. Robert Johnson
- Liner notes – Peter Leitch
