= Round Trip (Ralph Moore album) =

Studio album by Ralph Moore
- Released: 1987
- Recorded: December 21, 1985
- Studio: Van Gelder Studio, Englewood Cliffs, NJ
- Genre: Jazz
- Length: 42:23
- Label: Reservoir; RSR 104
- Producer: Mark Feldman

Ralph Moore chronology
Round Trip (1987)	623 C Street (1987)

Round Trip is the debut album led by saxophonist Ralph Moore which was recorded in 1985 and released on the Reservoir label in 1987.

== Reception ==
Professional ratings
Review scores
Source	Rating
AllMusic	4/5 stars
The Penguin Guide to Jazz Recordings	3/4 stars

In his review on AllMusic, Scott Yanow called it "A fine hard bop date and an excellent start to Ralph Moore's solo career".

== Track listing ==
All compositions by Ralph Moore except where noted

1. "Dunes" – 6:30
2. "Bewitched, Bothered and Bewildered" (Richard Rodgers, Lorenz Hart) – 6:08
3. "Round Trip" (Kevin Eubanks) – 5:07
4. "Lotus Blossom" (Kenny Dorham) – 6:04
5. "Monique" – 6:25
6. "Back Room Blues" (Brian Lynch) – 6:56
7. "Sleigh Ride" (Leroy Anderson) – 5:13 Additional track on CD reissue

== Personnel ==
- Ralph Moore – tenor saxophone
- Brian Lynch – trumpet
- Kevin Eubanks – guitar
- Benny Green – piano
- Rufus Reid – bass
- Kenny Washington – drums
