= Claudio! =

Studio album by Claudio Roditi featuring Slide Hampton
- Released: 1985
- Recorded: January 27, 1985
- Studio: Van Gelder Studio, Englewood Cliffs, NJ
- Genre: Jazz
- Length: 36:16
- Label: Uptown; UP 27.27
- Producer: Robert E. Sunenblick M.D. and Mark Feldman M.D.

Claudio Roditi chronology
Red on Red (1984)	Claudio! (1985)	Gemini Man (1988)

Claudio!, is an album by Brazilian trumpeter Claudio Roditi which was recorded in 1985 and released by the Uptown label.

== Reception ==
Professional ratings
Review scores
Source	Rating
AllMusic	4.5/5 stars

On AllMusic Scott Yanow states, "The music is mostly quite boppish, with Don Sickler and Roditi contributing arrangements for a notable sextet ... This is still one of his best recordings to date".

== Track listing ==
1. "Karioka" (Kenny Dorham) – 5:11
2. "Can't Help Lovin' Dat Man" (Jerome Kern, Oscar Hammerstein II) – 6:22
3. "Nefertiti" (Wayne Shorter) – 6:33
4. "The Eternal Triangle" (Sonny Stitt) – 6:46
5. "Lament" (J. J. Johnson) – 6:11
6. "My Romance" (Richard Rodgers, Lorenz Hart) – 5:13

== Personnel ==
- Claudio Roditi – trumpet, flugelhorn, arranger
- Slide Hampton – trombone
- Howard Kimbo – tenor saxophone
- Mulgrew Miller – piano
- Rufus Reid – double bass
- Akira Tana – drums
- Steve Sacks – synthesizer (tracks 3 & 5)
- Don Sickler – arranger
