= The Omni-American Book Club =

Studio album by Brian Lynch Big Band
- Released: 2019

The Omni-American Book Club is a studio album by the Brian Lynch Big Band and produced by Kabir Sehgal and Doug Davis. The album received a Grammy Award for Best Large Jazz Ensemble Album at the 62nd Annual Grammy Awards.
