= Trip to Moscow =

Studio album by Valery Ponomarev
- Released: 1988
- Recorded: April 11, 1988
- Studio: Van Gelder Studio, Englewood Cliffs, NJ
- Genre: Jazz
- Length: 54:41
- Label: Reservoir; RSR CD 107
- Producer: Mark Feldman

Valery Ponomarev chronology
Means of Identification (1987)	Trip to Moscow (1988)	Profile (1991)

Trip to Moscow is an album by trumpeter Valery Ponomarev which was recorded in 1988 and released on the Reservoir label.

== Reception ==
Professional ratings
Review scores
Source	Rating
AllMusic	4/5 stars

In his review on AllMusic, Scott Yanow called it an "excellent outing" stating: "For his second Reservoir set, trumpeter Valery Ponomarev performs six of his originals, which are dedicated to different aspects of the Russian homeland from where he had emigrated 15 years earlier ... the music is mostly strictly hard bop, quite accessible and hard-swinging".

== Track listing ==
All compositions by Valery Ponomarev except where noted

1. "Same Place, Same Time" – 8:03
2. "Gettin' to Bolshoi" – 7:42
3. "Gorky Park" – 8:06
4. "Trip to Moscow" – 9:16
5. "For You Only" – 7:59
6. "The Best Thing for You" (Irving Berlin) – 4:36
7. "Tell Me When/Skazshi Kagda" – 8:59

== Personnel ==
- Valery Ponomarev – trumpet
- Ralph Moore – tenor saxophone
- Larry Willis – piano
- Dennis Irwin – bass
- Victor Jones – drums
