= Dim the Lights =

1996 studio album by Mark Murphy

Studio album by Mark Murphy
- Released: 2004
- Recorded: 1996
- Studio: Calgary, Canada
- Genre: Vocal jazz
- Length: 1:08:28
- Label: Millennium Recordings Ltd.
- Producer: Kirk N. Loeffler

Mark Murphy chronology
Bop for Miles (2004)	Dim the Lights (2004)	Once to Every Heart (2005)

Dim the Lights is a 1996 studio album by jazz vocalist Mark Murphy, featuring pianist Benny Green, produced by Kirk N. Loeffler. It was released in 2004 by Millennium Records. The album contains two songs with original lyrics by Murphy, "Dim The Lights" and "Time All Gone".

== Background ==
Mark Murphy considered himself a rhythm singer. He explained why he chose Benny Green for this recording: "Benny Green has been playing with Ray Brown, and he's one of the new hot musicians coming out of the newer trends in jazz where they are listening to the later 50s music of rhythmic players like Ramsey Lewis and Ahmad Jamal. And to us it's old but to them it's brand new". Green was a protégé of Oscar Peterson and had worked with Art Blakey and Betty Carter.

Dim the Lights was recorded in Calgary in 1996 but not released for over three years in a limited edition (September 1999). The year of the recording Mark Murphy won the Downbeat readers' poll for Best Male Singer. Murphy won again in both 2000 and 2001. The album was released again in 2004, eight years after the original recording.

== Recording ==
Murphy experiments with overdubbing on track 4. The three tunes of the medley are overlaid so that you hear the vocal tracks of all three songs at once, including three different scat choruses.

== Release and reception ==
Professional ratings
Review scores
Source	Rating
The Virgin Encyclopedia of Popular Music	3/5 stars

The album was released on CD and digital. The album received 3 out of 5 stars by Colin Larkin on The Virgin Encyclopedia of Popular Music, stating, "Good by the artist's usual standards and therefore recommended".

Scott Yanow of AllMusic includes Dim the Lights in his list of Murphy's "other worthy recordings of the past 20 years" in his book The Jazz Singers: The Ultimate Guide.

In a DownBeat article from 1997, Dan Ouellette called Dim the Lights "a superb duo recording".

Writer Jim Santella called Dim the Lights a "highly recommended album".

In A Biographical Guide to the Great Jazz and Pop Singers, Will Friedwald wrote, "Dim the Lights teams him with Carter veteran Benny Green, and with his usual plethora of ideas, some brilliant and some bizarre".

Joel Siegel reviewing the album for JazzTimes found the duo unable to hold interest for the full 70 minutes and found Murphy's voice to "sound strained and grainy". Siegel however did praise the tracks “Two Lonely People” and “Street of Dreams.”

== Track listing ==
1. "Your Red Wagon" (Gene de Paul, Don Raye, Richard M. Jones) – 4:44
2. "Rules of the Road" (Carolyn Leigh, Cy Coleman) – 4:39
3. "Street of Dreams" (Sam M. Lewis, Victor Young) – 7:53
4. Trilogy – "Beautiful Love" / "Lullaby of the Leaves" / "Soft as in a Morning Sunrise" (Haven Gillespie, Egbert Van Alstyne, Wayne King, Victor Young / Joe Young, Bernice Petkere / Oscar Hammerstein II, Sigmund Romberg) – 3:27
5. "A Quiet Place" (Ralph Carmichael) – 3:49
6. "Dim the Lights" (Mark Murphy, Reinhold Util) – 4:27
7. "See You Later" (Flip Nuñez) – 5:10
8. "Two Lonely People" (Carol Hall, Bill Evans) – 6:53
9. "It Amazes Me" (Leigh, Coleman) – 5:48
10. "North Sea Night" (Suzie Scragg, Hein van de Geyn) – 3:14
11. "Time All Gone" (Murphy, Fernando Corrêa) – 5:02
12. "I Never Know When to Say When" / "I'm in Love Again" (Joan Ford, Jean Kerr, Walter Kerr, Leroy Anderson / Peggy Lee, Coleman, Bill Schluger) – 6:20
13. "Ravel Concerto" / "How Insensitive" / "Corcovado" (Maurice Ravel / Vinicius de Moraes, Norman Gimbel, Antônio Carlos Jobim / Gene Lees, Jobim) – 6:16
14. "The Man on the Other Side of the Street" (Kristen Michelle) – 0:46

== Personnel ==
Performance

- Mark Murphy – vocals
- Benny Green – piano

Production

- Brad Steckel – engineer, recorded in Calgary 1996
- Bud Bremmer – mastering engineer
- Kirk N. Loeffler – executive producer
- Jeff Bright – photography
- Ron Brouwer – design
- Will Friedwald – liner notes
