= Ron Jackson (jazz musician) =

American jazz guitarist, composer, and instructor

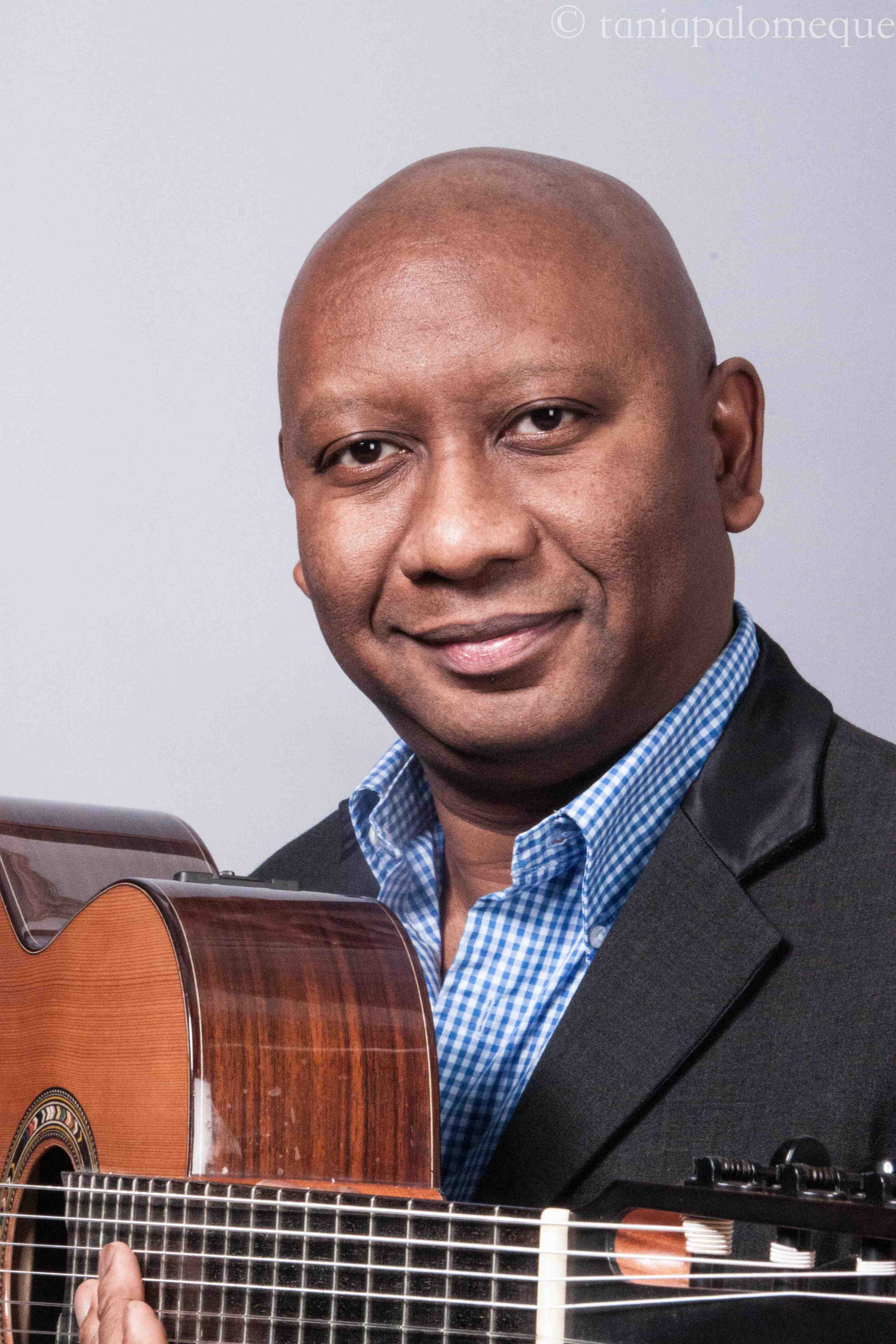

Background information
- Born: July 27, 1964 (age 61); Manila, Philippines
- Origin: New York City
- Genres: Jazz, hard bop, swing
- Occupations: Composer, arranger, instructor
- Instruments: 6-string guitar, 7-string guitar, electric bass
- Years active: 1980s–present
- Labels: Muse, Roni
- Website: ronjacksonmusic.com

Ron Jackson (born 1964) is an American jazz guitarist, composer, arranger, and instructor.

== Early life and career ==
Jackson was born in the Philippines on July 27, 1964, where his father was serving with the US Marines in Vietnam. He began playing the guitar at the age of 11 and played his first professional performance at the age of 15. He enrolled in the Berklee College of Music in 1982, concentrating on composition and arranging. In 1985 he left his graduate studies and spent two years in Paris where he began playing the electric bass. In 1987 he moved to New York City and resumed playing guitar. As a jazz guitarist he began touring North America and Europe.

== Recording and touring career ==
=== 1990s ===
In 1991 Jackson released A Guitar Thing at the age of 27, with collaborators including Benny Green, Lonnie Plaxico, and Cecil Brooks III. This was his debut album as leader, and debuted at #26 on the R&R National Airplay chart. He followed this up with the album Thinking of You, which he also released on Muse Records. In the early 1990s Jackson fronted the Ron Jackson Quartet. In 1995 Jackson joined the group 5 Guitars Play Mingus, playing alongside Russell Malone, leader Peter Leitch, David Gilmore, and Jack Wilkins, in New York venues like the ArtsCenter. He soon released an album of duets with Rufus Reid called Song for Luis. In 1996 took first prize in the Heritage International Jazz Guitar Competition. As his career has progressed he has continued to work alternative music gigs such as subbing in orchestral pits, playing weddings and other parties, working in jam bands, and other positions. He was also a member of the Rufus Reid Trio as well as the Randy Weston Group. In 1999 Jackson released the album Concrete Jungle with Nicki Parrott.

=== 2000s ===
After the release of Concrete Jungle, Jackson formed his own label Roni Music, and has since released his further albums independently. In 2003 Jackson released the album The Dream I had, a combination of jazz standards and original compositions. In 2008 he released the album Flubby Dubby and in 2012 he released the album Burning Gums, the eponymous debut album of the group of the same name. He has toured and recorded as a member of several groups, including the Greg Lewis Organ Monk Trio, and has played regularly in New York City at jazz clubs like Birdland, Iridium Jazz Club, 55 Bar, and the Blue Note Jazz Club. Acts and musicians Jackson has played with include Randy Weston, Oliver Lake, James Spaulding, Jimmy McGriff, Melvin Rhyne, Lonnie Smith, Benny Golson, Dee Dee Bridgewater, Dewey Redman, Gary Bartz, Ralph Peterson Jr., and Greg Lewis.

== Teaching ==
Jackson is a jazz educator and guitar instructor. He has held faculty positions at the New Jersey Performing Arts Center, the Wells Fargo Jazz For Teens Program, the Brooklyn–Queens Conservatory of Music, and Jazz At Lincoln Center. Jackson is also a contributor for Acoustic Guitar Magazine.

== Discography ==
=== As leader ===
- A Guitar Thing (Muse, 1992)
- Thinking of You (Muse, 1994)
- Song for Luis (Mastermix, 1996)
- Concrete Jungle (Airmen, 1999)
- The Dream I Had (Roni, 2003)
- Flubby Dubby (Roni, 2008)
- Burning Gums (Roni, 2011)
- Akustik InventYours (Roni, 2014)
- Standards and Other Songs (Roni, 2019)
- Standards and My Songs (Roni, 2022)
- Daydreaming - EP (Roni, 2024)
