= Images (Ralph Moore album) =

Studio album by Ralph Moore
- Released: 1989
- Recorded: December 15 & 17, 1988
- Studios: Van Gelder Studio, Englewood Cliffs, NJ
- Genre: Jazz
- Length: 52:21 CD reissue with additional track
- Labels: Landmark; LLP-1520
- Producer: Orrin Keepnews

Ralph Moore chronology
Rejuvenate! (1989)	Images (1989)	Furthermore (1990)

Images is the fourth album led by saxophonist Ralph Moore which was recorded in 1989 and released on the Landmark label.

== Reception ==
Professional ratings
Review scores
Source	Rating
AllMusic	4/5 stars

In his review on AllMusic, Scott Yanow stated "The particularly strong material and the all-star lineup make this a particularly enjoyable set from the tenorman. Although still displaying the inspiration (soundwise) of early-'60s John Coltrane, Moore had developed an increasingly original style within the modern mainstream throughout the 1980s ... One of Ralph Moore's more significant recordings to date".

== Track listing ==
All compositions by Ralph Moore except where noted

1. "Freeway" – 8:04
2. "Enigma" (J. J. Johnson) – 5:29
3. "Episode from a Village Dance" (Donald Brown) – 7:37
4. "Morning Star" (Rodgers Grant) – 8:31 Additional track on CD reissue
5. "This I Dig of You" (Hank Mobley) – 5:36
6. "Blues for You" – 5:04
7. "Punjab" (Joe Henderson) – 6:59
8. "One Second, Please" (Elmo Hope) – 5:01

== Personnel ==
- Ralph Moore – tenor saxophone
- Terence Blanchard – trumpet (tracks 1, 3, 5 & 7)
- Benny Green – piano
- Peter Washington – bass
- Kenny Washington – drums
