= Simpático (The Brian Lynch/Eddie Palmieri Project album) =

Studio album by the Brian Lynch/Eddie Palmieri Project
- Released: November 16, 2006
- Recorded: November 23 – December 5, 2005
- Genre: Latin jazz
- Length: 66:38
- Label: ArtistShare

Professional ratings
Review scores
Source	Rating
All About Jazz	5/5 stars
AllMusic	4.5/5 stars
The Penguin Guide to Jazz Recordings	3.5/4 stars

Simpático is an album by the Brian Lynch/Eddie Palmieri Project, released through ArtistShare in 2006. In 2007, the album won the Grammy Award for Best Latin Jazz Album.

== Track listing ==
No.	Title	Writer(s)	Length
1.	"The Palmieri Effect"	Brian Lynch	7:53
2.	"Que Sería la Vida"	Lynch, Lila Downs	5:25
3.	"Guajira Dubois"	Lynch	8:51
4.	"Jazz Impromptu"	Lynch	6:03
5.	"Páginas de Mujer"	Eddie Palmieri	8:39
6.	"Slippery"	Lynch	8:18
7.	"Jazzucar"	Lynch, Palmieri	8:24
8.	"Tema Para Marissa"	Lynch, Palmieri	6:15
9.	"Freehands"	Lynch, Palmieri	6:50

Track listing adapted from AllMusic.

== Personnel ==
- Brian Lynch – trumpet, arranger, producer, mixing, liner notes
- Eddie Palmieri – piano, liner notes
- Lila Downs – vocals
- Donald Harrison – alto sax
- Yosvany Terry – alto sax
- Phil Woods – alto sax
- Gregory Tardy – tenor sax, clarinet
- Mario Rivera – baritone sax
- Joe Fiedler – trombone
- Conrad Herwig – trombone
- Boris Kozlov – double bass
- Ruben Rodriguez – bass guitar
- Adam Rogers – acoustic guitar
- Edsel Gomez – organ, piano
- Robby Ameen – drums
- Dafnis Prieto – drums
- Giovanni Hidalgo – conga
- Pedro Rodriguez – conga
- Timbales – Marvin Diz
- Tom Dambly – assistant producer, digital editing, liner notes, mixing assistant, photography
- Dave Darlington – engineer, mixing
- Tom Carr – mastering
- christian ericson – art direction & design
- Nick Ruechel – liner notes, photography
- Ted Panken – liner notes
