= A Spanish Treasure =

Studio album by The Tete Montoliu Trio
- Released: 1992
- Recorded: June 27, 1991
- Studios: VS Video Sunmall, Tokyo, Japan
- Genre: Jazz
- Length: 49:00
- Labels: Concord Jazz; CCD-4493-2
- Producers: Carl Jefferson, Akira Tana

Tete Montoliu chronology
The Man from Barcelona (1990)	A Spanish Treasure (1992)	Catalonian Rhapsody (1992)

A Spanish Treasure is an album by pianist Tete Montoliu recorded in Japan in 1991 and released on the Concord Jazz label.

== Reception ==
Professional ratings
Review scores
Source	Rating
AllMusic	4/5 stars

Scott Yanow of AllMusic states, "A fine bop-based stylist, Montoliu generally offers few surprises to listeners but always swings. This CD is a typical outing for the pianist, featuring ten jazz standards, fine backup work by bassist Rufus Reid and drummer Akira Tana".

== Track listing ==
1. "Israel" (John Carisi) – 5:10
2. "Don't Blame Me" (Jimmy McHugh, Dorothy Fields) – 7:21
3. "Tricrotism" (Oscar Pettiford) – 4:23
4. "Misterioso" (Thelonious Monk) – 4:02
5. "Our Delight" (Tadd Dameron) – 3:45
6. "Like Someone in Love" (Jimmy Van Heusen, Johnny Burke) – 6:07
7. "The Way You Look Tonight" (Jerome Kern, Fields) – 6:31
8. "All of You" (Cole Porter) – 5:46
9. "What's New?" (Bob Haggart, Burke) – 10:25
10. "All Blues" (Miles Davis) – 5:45

== Personnel ==
- Tete Montoliu – piano
- Rufus Reid – bass
- Akira Tana – drums
