= Some of My Best Friends Are...The Piano Players =

Studio album by Ray Brown
- Released: 1995
- Recorded: November 18, 21, 1994
- Genre: Jazz
- Length: 56:24
- Label: Telarc
- Producer: Elaine Martone

Ray Brown chronology
Some of My Best Friends Are...The Piano Players (1995)	Seven Steps to Heaven (1994)

Professional ratings
Review scores
Source	Rating
Allmusic	3/5 stars
The Penguin Guide to Jazz Recordings	3/4 stars

Some of My Best Friends Are...The Piano Players is an album by double bassist Ray Brown, accompanied by pianists Benny Green, Geoffrey Keezer, Ahmad Jamal, Dado Moroni, and Oscar Peterson.

== Track listing ==
1. "Bags' Groove" (Milt Jackson) – 4:20
2. "Love Walked In" (George Gershwin, Ira Gershwin) – 4:36
3. "St. Louis Blues" (W. C. Handy) – 7:15
4. "Lover" (Lorenz Hart, Richard Rodgers) – 3:39
5. "Just a Gigolo" (Irving Caesar, Leonello Casucci, Julius Brammer) – 5:29
6. "Ray of Light" (Benny Green) – 3:51
7. "Giant Steps" (John Coltrane) – 6:06
8. "My Romance" (Hart, Rodgers) – 4:51
9. "Close Your Eyes" (Bernice Petkere) – 4:40
10. "St. Tropez" (Oscar Peterson) – 5:10
11. "How Come You Do Me Like You Do?" (Gene Austin, Roy Bergere) – 6:27

== Personnel ==
- Ray Brown – double bass
- Benny Green – piano
- Ahmad Jamal
- Geoff Keezer
- Dado Moroni
- Oscar Peterson
- Lewis Nash – drums
