= Catalonian Rhapsody =

Studio album by Tete Montoliu Trio
- Released: 1992
- Recorded: March 8, 1992
- Studios: Albert Moraleda Studio, Barcelona
- Genre: Jazz
- Length: 52:26
- Labels: Alfa; ALCR-172
- Producer: Tetsuo Hara

Tete Montoliu chronology
A Spanish Treasure (1991)	Catalonian Rhapsody (1992)	Music for Anna (1992)

Catalonian Rhapsody is an album by pianist Tete Montoliu recorded in Spain in 1992 and first released on the Japanese label, Alfa before being reissued on Venus Records in 2014.

Professional ratings
Review scores
Source	Rating
AllMusic	4.5/5 stars

== Track listing ==
All compositions are traditional except where noted.

1. "The Lady from Aragon" – 7:01
2. "Catalonian National Anthem" – 7:43
3. "Three Young Ladies" – 6:34
4. "The Singing of the Birds" – 6:55
5. "Song of the Robber" – 6:25
6. "Words of Love" (Joan Manuel Serrat) – 4:49
7. "Don't Smoke Anymore" (Tete Montoliu) – 4:48
8. "My Street" (Serrat) – 8:11

== Personnel ==
- Tete Montoliu – piano
- Hein van de Geyn – bass
- Idris Muhammad – drums
