= Means of Identification =

1987 album by Valery Ponomarev

Studio album by Valery Ponomarev
- Released: 1987
- Recorded: April 14, 1985
- Studio: Van Gelder Studio, Englewood Cliffs, NJ
- Genre: Jazz
- Length: 50:09
- Label: Reservoir; RSR 101
- Producer: Mark Feldman

Valery Ponomarev chronology
Means of Identification (1987)	Trip to Moscow (1991)

Means of Identification is an album by trumpeter Valery Ponomarev which was recorded in 1985 and released on the Reservoir label in 1987.

== Reception ==
Professional ratings
Review scores
Source	Rating
AllMusic	4/5 stars
The Penguin Guide to Jazz Recordings	3.5/4 stars

In his review on AllMusic, Scott Yanow states "The Reservoir label debuted with this excellent effort from trumpeter Valery Ponomarev, who was making his first recording as a leader. Five years earlier he had ended a nearly four-year stay with Art Blakey's Jazz Messengers, and although he never seems to receive the fame he deserved, Ponomarev since then has been one of the top Clifford Brown-inspired hard bop trumpeters around ... the music should please hard bop collectors".

== Track listing ==
All compositions by Valery Ponomarev except where noted.

1. "Dialogue" – 5:56
2. "Means of Identification" – 4:52
3. "Mirage" – 3:56
4. "I Remember Clifford" (Benny Golson) – 7:41
5. "Fifteenth Round" – 4:56
6. "Envoy" – 5:46
7. "Take Care" – 6:31
8. "Take Care" [alternate take] – 6:15 Additional track on CD reissue
9. "Russian Christmas Song" (Traditional) – 4:16 Additional track on CD reissue

== Personnel ==
- Valery Ponomarev – trumpet
- Ralph Moore – tenor saxophone
- Hideki Takao – piano
- Dennis Irwin – bass
- Kenny Washington – drums
