= Furthermore (Ralph Moore album) =

Studio album by Ralph Moore
- Released: 1990
- Recorded: March 3 & 5, 1990
- Studios: Van Gelder Studio, Englewood Cliffs, NJ
- Genre: Jazz
- Length: 48:40
- Labels: Landmark; LLP-1526
- Producer: Orrin Keepnews

Ralph Moore chronology
| Images (1989) | Furthermore (1990) | Who It Is You Are (1993) |

Furthermore is the fifth album led by saxophonist Ralph Moore which was recorded in 1989 and released on the Landmark label.

== Reception ==
Professional ratings
Review scores
| Source | Rating |
|---|---|
| AllMusic | 4/5 stars |

In his review on AllMusic, Stephen Cook stated "Furthermore does not break the mold so much as provide a pleasurable listening experience of the highest order. A potential dinner party classic; subtle enough not to disturb the guests, but provocative enough to elicit comments".

== Track listing ==
All compositions by Ralph Moore except where noted

1. "Hopscotch" – 7:56
2. "Monk's Dream" (Thelonious Monk) – 7:57
3. "3 1 0 Blues" – 8:04
4. "Phoebe's Samba" (Benny Green) – 5:53
5. "Girl Talk" (Neal Hefti) – 6:55
6. "Into Dawn" (Roy Hargrove) – 7:40
7. "Line D" – 4:15

== Personnel ==
- Ralph Moore – tenor saxophone
- Roy Hargrove – trumpet (tracks 1, 3, 4 & 6)
- Benny Green – piano
- Peter Washington – bass
- Victor Lewis (tracks 2, 4, 6 & 7), Kenny Washington (tracks 1, 3 & 5) – drums
