= Madera Latino =

Studio album by Brian Lynch
- Released: 2016
- Genre: Latin jazz
- Label: Hollistic MusicWorks

Brian Lynch chronology
Questioned Answer (2014)	Madera Latino (2016)

Madera Latino: A Latin Jazz Perspective on the Music of Woody Shaw is an album by Brian Lynch and various artists. It earned Lynch a Grammy Award nomination for Best Latin Jazz Album.
