= Rejuvenate! =

Studio album by Ralph Moore
- Released: 1989
- Recorded: February 19, 1988
- Studio: Van Gelder Studio, Englewood Cliffs, NJ
- Genre: Jazz
- Length: 60:31 CD reissue with additional track
- Label: Criss Cross Jazz; Criss 1035
- Producer: Gerry Teekens

Ralph Moore chronology
623 C Street (1987)	Rejuvenate! (1989)	Images (1988)

Rejuvenate! is the third album led by saxophonist Ralph Moore which was recorded in 1988 and released on the Dutch Criss Cross Jazz label.

== Reception ==
Professional ratings
Review scores
Source	Rating
AllMusic	4.5/5 stars
The Penguin Guide to Jazz Recordings	3.5/4 stars

In his review on AllMusic, Scott Yanow stated "The two horns blend together very well and consistently inspire each other; the rhythm section is state-of-the-art for this type of modern hard bop music, and the overall results are swinging and at times a bit adventurous. Recommended."

== Track listing ==
All compositions by Ralph Moore except where noted

1. "Rejuvenate!" (Bobby Porcelli) – 6:38
2. "Josephine" – 8:49
3. "C.R.M." – 8:14
4. "Exact Change" (Mulgrew Miller) – 8:44
5. "It Might as Well Be Spring" (Richard Rodgers, Oscar Hammerstein II) – 7:02
6. "Song for Soweto" – 9:02
7. "Melody for Mr. C" (Steve Turre) – 10:55 Additional track on CD release

== Personnel ==
- Ralph Moore – tenor saxophone, soprano saxophone
- Steve Turre – trombone, conch shell
- Mulgrew Miller – piano
- Peter Washington – bass
- Marvin "Smitty" Smith – drums
