= 623 C Street =

Studio album by Ralph Moore
- Released: 1987
- Recorded: February 27, 1987 and December 31, 1987
- Studio: Van Gelder Studio, Englewood Cliffs, NJ
- Genre: Jazz
- Length: 59:44 CD reissue with additional tracks
- Label: Criss Cross Jazz; Criss 1028
- Producer: Gerry Teekens

Ralph Moore chronology
Round Trip (1987)	623 C Street (1987)	Rejuvenate! (1989)

623 C Street is the second album led by saxophonist Ralph Moore which was recorded in 1987 and released on the Dutch Criss Cross Jazz label.

== Reception ==
Professional ratings
Review scores
Source	Rating
AllMusic	4/5 stars
The Penguin Guide to Jazz Recordings	3/4 stars

In his review on AllMusic, Scott Yanow stated "Displaying a tone on tenor similar to John Coltrane's, Moore's note choices are more original than his sound. A solid modern mainstream set".

== Track listing ==
1. "Un Poco Loco" (Bud Powell) – 10:22
2. "Christina" (Buster Williams) – 4:42
3. "Black Diamond" (Wayne Shorter) – 6:06
4. "It Never Entered My Mind" (Richard Rodgers, Lorenz Hart) – 6:53 Additional track on CD reissue
5. "Cecilia" (David Kikoski) – 7:27
6. "623 C Street" (Ralph Moore) – 8:49
7. "Deceptacon" (Williams) – 7:05
8. "Speak Low" (Kurt Weill, Ogden Nash) – 8:20 Additional track on CD reissue
- Recorded at Van Gelder Studio, Englewood Cliffs, NJ on February 27, 1987 (tracks 1–3 & 5–7) and December 31, 1987 (tracks 4 & 8)

== Personnel ==
- Ralph Moore – tenor saxophone, soprano saxophone
- David Kikoski – piano
- Buster Williams – bass
- Billy Hart – drums
