= Santos - Skin to Skin =

2022 film directed by Kathryn Golden

- Theatrical Poster
- Directed by: Kathryn Golden
- Produced by: Ashley James; Kathryn Golden
- Starring: John Santos; Aida Salazar; John Calloway; Eddie Palmieri; Orestes Vilato; Raul Rekow; Omar Sosa; Rico Pabon; Abhijit Banerjee
- Cinematography: Ashley James
- Edited by: Kathryn Golden
- Music by: John Santos; The Machete Ensemble; The Santos Sextet
- Release date: March 12, 2022 (SXSW)
- Running time: 75 minutes
- Country: United States
- Language: English

Santos - Skin to Skin is a 2022 American documentary film directed by Kathryn Golden. The film about John Santos and his music.

== Synopsis ==
Santos - Skin to Skin is a film portrait of community activist and seven-time Grammy nominee John Santos, a “keeper of the Afro-Caribbean flame.” Rich in unforgettable musical performances, Santos links the rhythms of his ancestors to contemporary struggles against urban gentrification, social inequality, and racial injustice. His hands on the skin of the conga peel back the legacy of colonialism while navigating the politics of culture and global migration. One of the world’s foremost exponents of Afro-Latin music, Santos, through his mixed Puerto Rican & Cape Verdean heritage, musical storytelling and legendary percussion classes, strives to unite and expand his kaleidoscopic audience.

— SXSW Film Festival

== Cast ==
- John Santos
- Aida Salazar
- John Calloway
- Eddie Palmieri
- Orestes Vilato
- Raul Rekow
- Omar Sosa
- Rico Pabon
- Abhijit Banerjee

== Release ==
Santos - Skin to Skin had its world premiere during SXSW on March 12, 2022.
