= Byron Stripling =

American jazz trumpeter

- Born: Lloyd Byron Stripling; August 20, 1961 (age 64); Atlanta, Georgia, U.S.
- Genres: Jazz
- Occupation: Musician
- Instrument: Trumpet
- Years active: 1980–present
- Label: Nagel-Heyer
- Formerly of: Count Basie Orchestra
- Website: www.byronstripling.com

Byron Stripling is a jazz trumpeter who has been a member of the Count Basie Orchestra.

== Career ==
He was born Lloyd Byron Stripling on August 20, 1961, in Atlanta, Georgia. He attended Eastman School of Music in Rochester, New York, and the Interlochen Arts Academy in Interlochen, Michigan.

Following his studies, he was featured as lead trumpeter and soloist with the Count Basie Orchestra, under the direction of Thad Jones and Frank Foster. He toured and recorded with Dizzy Gillespie, Woody Herman, Lionel Hampton, Clark Terry, Louis Bellson, Buck Clayton, Gerry Mulligan, J.J. Johnson, Jim Hall, Sonny Rollins, Paquito D'Rivera, Freddie Cole, Jack McDuff, the Lincoln Center Jazz Orchestra, the Carnegie Hall Jazz Band, the Joe Henderson Big Band, and the GRP All-Star Big Band.

Stripling debuted at Carnegie Hall with Skitch Henderson and The New York Pops. He has been a featured soloist at the Hollywood Bowl and with the Boston Pops Orchestra, Cincinnati Pops Orchestra, Seattle Symphony, Baltimore Symphony Orchestra, Minnesota Orchestra, St. Louis Symphony Orchestra, Vancouver Symphony Orchestra, Utah Symphony, Maryland Symphony Orchestra, and the American Jazz Philharmonic.

He had the lead role in the musicals Satchmo and From Second Avenue to Broadway and a cameo in the television movie, The Young Indiana Jones Chronicles. He again portrayed Louis Armstrong in Dave Brubeck's revival of The Real Ambassadors.

In 2002, he was appointed artistic director of the Columbus Jazz Orchestra, succeeding Ray Eubanks, the founder of Jazz Arts Group.

In 2012, Stripling started being an annually featured performer at the Vail Jazz Festival over Labor Day Weekend in Vail, Colorado.

In 2020, Stripling was appointed as only the second Principal Pops Conductor for the Pittsburgh Symphony Orchestra, where he now holds the Henry and Elsie Hillman Principal Pops Conductor Chair. In 2024, he was named the Stein Family Principal Pops Conductor of the Milwaukee Symphony Orchestra.

== Discography ==
=== As leader ===
- Stripling Now! (Nagel Heyer, 1999)
- If I Could Be with You (Nagel Heyer, 2000)
- Byron, Get One Free... (Nagel Heyer, 2001)

=== As sideman ===
- American Jazz Orchestra, The Music of Jimmie Lunceford (MusicMasters, 1991)
- Count Basie Orchestra, Long Live the Chief (Denon, 1986)
- Count Basie Orchestra & Frank Foster, The Legend the Legacy (Denon, 1989)
- George Benson, Big Boss Band (Warner Bros., 1990)
- Big Daddy Kane, Daddy's Home (MCA, 1994)
- Dee Dee Bridgewater, Dear Ella (Verve, 1997)
- Carla Bley, Looking for America (WATT/ECM, 2003)
- Carmen Bradford, Finally Yours (Amazing, 1992)
- Carnegie Hall Jazz Band, The Carnegie Hall Jazz Band/Music Director Jon Faddis (Blue Note, 1996)
- Buck Clayton, Swings the Village (Nagel Heyer, 2002)
- Freddy Cole, Always (Fantasy, 1995)
- Freddy Cole, To the Ends of the Earth (Fantasy, 1997)
- Elvis Costello, Painted from Memory (Mercury, 1998)
- Paquito D'Rivera, A Night in Englewood (Messidor, 1994)
- Di Blasio, Latino (BMG, 1995)
- Benny Green, The Place To Be (Blue Note, 1994)
- Dave Grusin, All Star Big Band Live! (GRP, 1993)
- Dave Grusin, Dave Grusin Presents West Side Story (N2K Encoded Music, 1997)
- Jonathan Haas, Johnny H & the Prisoners of Swing (Sunset, 1994)
- Jim Hall, Youkali (CTI, 1992)
- Mary Cleere Haran, Pennies from Heaven (Angel, 1998)
- Joe Henderson, Big Band (Verve, 1996)
- Milt Jackson, Explosive! (Qwest, 1999)
- Denise Jannah, I Was Born in Love with You (Blue Note, 1995)
- Elton John & Tim Rice, Aida (Rocket, 1999)
- J.J. Johnson, The Brass Orchestra (Verve, 1997)
- Thad Jones & the Count Basie Orchestra, Way Out Basie (Philips, 1987)
- Kansas City Jazz Orchestra, Live On the Plaza (KCJO, 2007)
- Viktor Lazlo, Viktor Lazlo (Polydor, 1987)
- Amy London, Bridges (FiveCut, 2014)
- The Manhattan Transfer, Vocalese (Atlantic, 1985)
- Jack McDuff, Write On, Capt'n (Concord Jazz, 1993)
- George Michael, Songs from the Last Century (Virgin, 1999)
- Bob Mintzer, Homage to Count Basie (DMP, 2000)
- Grover Mitchell, Hip Shakin' (Ken Music, 1990)
- Gerry Mulligan, Dragonfly (Telarc, 1995)
- Rosie O'Donnell, A Rosie Christmas (Columbia, 1999)
- Mandy Patinkin, Mamaloshen (Nonesuch, 1998)
- Nicki Parrott, Stompin' at the Savoy (Venus, 2018)
- Sonny Rollins, Old Flames (Milestone, 1993)
- Randy Sandke, The Music of Bob Haggart (Arbors, 2002)
- Diane Schuur, Diane Schuur and the Count Basie Orchestra (GRP, 1987)
- Carol Sloane, The Songs Sinatra Sang (Concord 1996)
- Jeff Tyzik, Prophecy (Prophecy 1980)
- Jeff Tyzik, The Farthest Corner of My Mind (Amherst, 1986)
- Caterina Valente, Caterina Valente '86 & the Count Basie Orchestra (Global and Tapes 1986)
