= Gary Smulyan =

American jazz baritone saxophonist (born 1956)

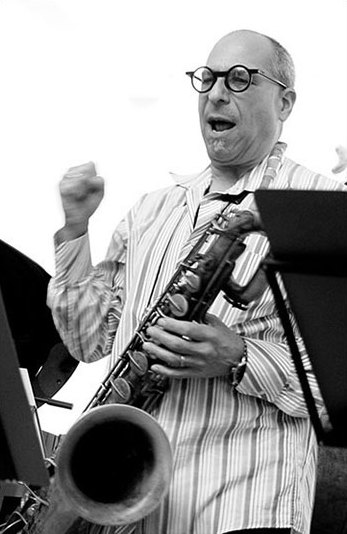
- Gary Smulyan in Aarhus, Denmark, 2015

Background information
- Born: April 4, 1956 (age 70); Bethpage, New York, U.S.
- Education: Hofstra University
- Genre: Jazz
- Occupation: Musician
- Instrument: Baritone saxophone
- Years active: 1970s–present
- Labels: Criss Cross; Reservoir
- Website: www.garysmulyan.com

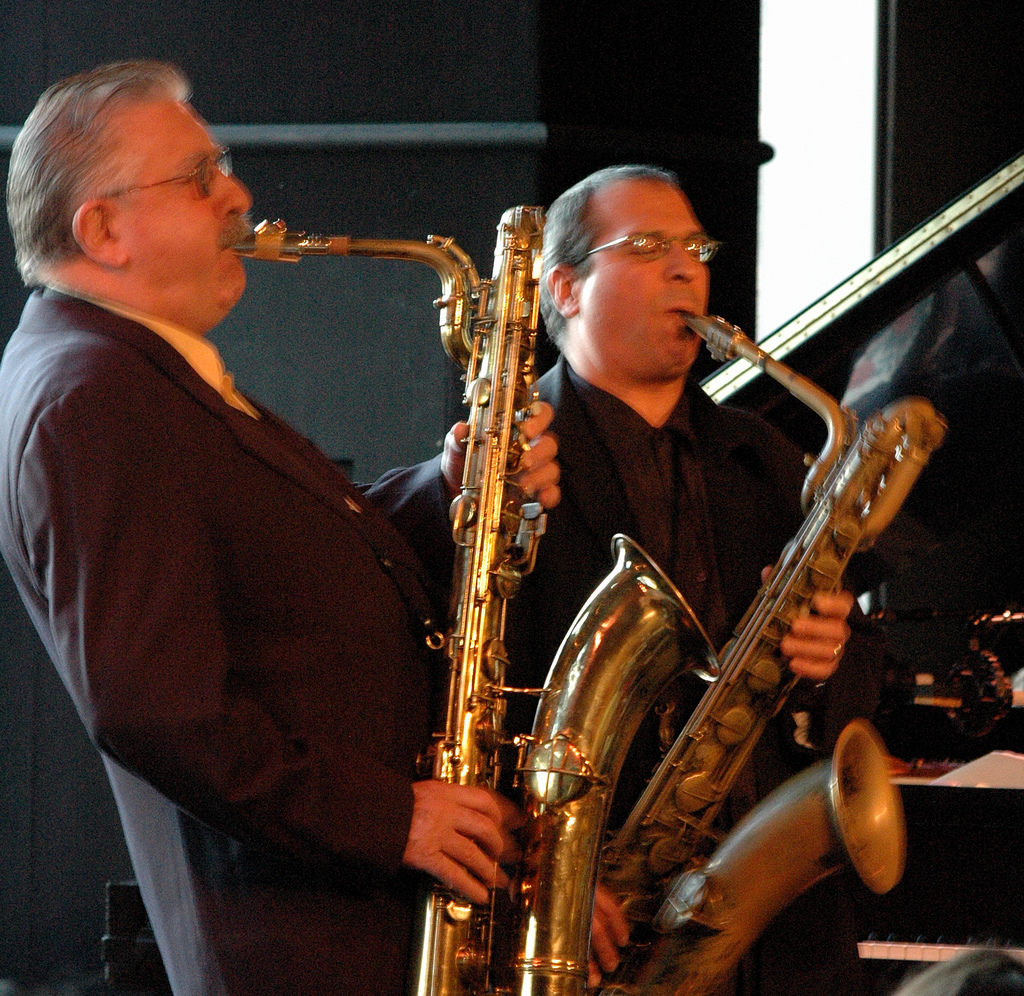
Joe Temperley and Gary Smulyan

Gary Smulyan (born April 4, 1956) is an American jazz musician who plays baritone saxophone. He studied at Hofstra University before working with Woody Herman. He leads a trio with bassist Ray Drummond and drummer Kenny Washington.

== Career ==
Smulyan has played with the Vanguard Jazz Orchestra, the Mel Lewis Big Band, the Dave Holland Big Band and Octet, the Dizzy Gillespie All Star Big Band, and he has performed and recorded with Carla Bley's Big Band.

Smulyan's two greatest influences were Harry Carney and, above all, Pepper Adams. After the latter's death, he recorded an album, Homage, consisting entirely of tracks composed by Adams.

Since the early 2000s, Smulyan has consistently topped Down Beat magazine's charts in the "baritone saxophone" category.

== Discography ==
=== As leader ===
- The Lure of Beauty (Criss Cross, 1991)
- Homage (Criss Cross, 1993)
- Saxophone Mosaic (Criss Cross, 1994)
- Gary Smulyan with Strings (Criss Cross, 1996)
- Blue Suite (Criss Cross, 1999)
- The Real Deal (Reservoir, 2003)
- Hidden Treasures (Reservoir, 2006)
- More Treasures (Reservoir, 2007)
- High Noon (Reservoir, 2008)
- Smul's Paradise (Capri, 2012)
- Bella Napoli with Dominic Chianese (Capri, 2013)
- Royalty at Le Duc (Groovin' High 2017)
- Alternative Contrafacts (SteepleChase, 2018)
- Our Contrafacts (SteepleChase, 2020)
- Tough Baritones with Ronnie Cuber (SteepleChase, 2020)
- Tadd's All Folks (SteepleChase, 2022)
- Boss Baritones with Frank Basile (SteepleChase, 2024)

=== As sideman ===
With Dizzy Gillespie All-Star Big Band and Alumni All-Star Big Band

- Things to Come (MCG, 2002)
- Dizzy's Business (MCG, 2006)
- I'm BeBoppin' Too (Half Note, 2008)

With Woody Herman

- Woody and Friends (Concord Jazz, 1981)
- La Fiesta (West Wind, 1991)
- The Woody Herman Orchestra (Jazz Door, 1991)

With Dave Holland

- What Goes Around (ECM, 2002)
- Overtime (Dare2, 2004)
- Pathways (Dare2, 2010)

With the Mel Lewis Orchestra

- Make Me Smile & Other New Works by Bob Brookmeyer (Finesse, 1982)
- 20 Years at the Village Vanguard (Atlantic, 1986)
- Soft Lights and Hot Music (Musicmasters, 1988)
- The Lost Art (Musicmasters, 1989)
- The Definitive Thad Jones (Musicmasters, 1989)
- The Definitive Thad Jones Volume 2 (Musicmasters, 1990)
- To You (Musicmasters, 1991)

With the Vanguard Jazz Orchestra

- Lickety Split (New World, 1997)
- Thad Jones Legacy (New World, 1999)
- Can I Persuade You? (Planet Arts, 2001)
- The Way (Planet Arts, 2004)
- Up from the Skies (Planet Arts, 2006)
- Monday Night Live at the Village Vanguard (Planet Arts, 2008)
- Forever Lasting: Live in Tokyo (Planet Arts, 2011)
- Overtime Music of Bob Brookmeyer (Planet Arts, 2014)

With others

- Harry Allen, The Candy Men (Arbors, 2016)
- Carla Bley, Looking for America (WATT/ECM, 2003)
- David Byrne, Grown Backwards (Nonesuch, 2004)
- Michel Camilo, One More Once (Columbia, 1994)
- Michel Camilo, Caribe (Calle 54, 2009)
- Carnegie Hall Jazz Band, The Carnegie Hall Jazz Band/Music Director Jon Faddis (Blue Note, 1996)
- Freddy Cole, Merry-Go-Round (Telarc, 2000)
- George Coleman, Danger High Voltage (Two and Four, 2000)
- Dena DeRose, We Won't Forget You...An Homage to Shirley Horn (HighNote, 2014)
- Bill Evans, Push (Lipstick, 1994)
- Gil Evans, Hidden Treasures Vol. 1 (Monday Nights, 2018)
- Jon Faddis, Teranga (Koch, 2006)
- John Fedchock, Up & Running (Reservoir, 2007)
- John Fedchock, Like It Is (Mama, 2015)
- Don Friedman, Don Friedman the Composer Live at Jazz Baltica Salzau (Enja, 2010)
- Benny Green, The Place to Be (Blue Note, 1994)
- Tom Harrell, Labyrinth (RCA Victor, 1996)
- Tom Harrell, The Art of Rhythm (RCA Victor, 1998)
- Gene Harris, Live at Town Hall N.Y.C. (Concord Jazz, 1989)
- Gene Harris, World Tour 1990 (Concord Jazz, 1991)
- Jimmy Heath, Turn Up the Heath (Planet Arts, 2006)
- Joe Henderson, Big Band (Verve, 1996)
- Conrad Herwig, The Latin Side of John Coltrane (Astor Place, 1996)
- Freddie Hubbard, MMTC: Monk, Miles, Trane & Cannon (MusicMasters, 1995)
- Denise Jannah, I Was Born in Love with You (Blue Note, 1995)
- B.B. King, Live at the Apollo (GRP, 1991)
- Mike LeDonne, Bout Time (Criss Cross, 1988)
- Mike LeDonne, The Feeling of Jazz (Criss Cross, 1990)
- Joe Lovano, 52nd Street Themes (Blue Note, 2000)
- Joe Lovano, Streams of Expression (Blue Note, 2006)
- Joe Magnarelli, Always There (Criss Cross, 1997)
- Joe Magnarelli, Persistence (Reservoir, 2008)
- Kevin Mahogany, Songs and Moments (Enja, 1994)
- Mark Masters, The Clifford Brown Project (Capri, 2003)
- Mingus Big Band, Gunslinging Birds (Dreyfus, 1995)
- Mingus Big Band, Live in Time (Dreyfus, 1996)
- Grachan Moncur III, Exploration (Capri, 2004)
- Eddie Palmieri, Full Circle (Ropeadope, 2018)
- Eddie Palmieri, Mi Luz Mayor (Ropeadope, 2018)
- Charlie Parker, Bird (Columbia, 2011)
- Charlie Persip, Charlie Persip and Gerry Lafurn's 17-Piece Superband (Stash, 1981)
- Charlie Persip, Charli Persip & Superband (Natasha, 1994)
- Diana Ross, Live Stolen Moments (Motown, 1993)
- Rob Schneiderman, Radio Waves (Reservoir, 1991)
- Rob Schneiderman, Dancing in the Dark (Reservoir, 1998)
- John Scofield, Up All Night (Verve, 2003)
- Don Sickler, Night Watch (Uptown, 1995)
- Mark Soskin, Keys of the City (Koei, 1990)
- Dave Stryker, Blue to the Bone IV (SteepleChase, 2013)
- Roseanna Vitro, Catchin' Some Rays (Telarc, 1997)
- Walt Weiskopf, Day in Night Out (Criss Cross, 2008)
- Gerald Wilson, In My Time (Mack Avenue, 2005)
- Gerald Wilson, Legacy (Mack Avenue, 2011)
