= Palmas (album) =

Studio album by Eddie Palmieri
- Released: 1994
- Label: Elektra/Nonesuch
- Producer: Eddie Palmieri

Eddie Palmieri chronology
Sueño (1989)	Palmas (1994)	Arete (1995)

Palmas is an album by the American musician Eddie Palmieri, released in 1994. Palmieri supported the album by playing shows with Milton Nascimento.

The album peaked at No. 44 on Billboard's Jazz Albums chart. It was nominated for a Grammy Award for "Best Latin Jazz Performance".

== Production ==
The album was produced by Palmieri, who also composed all of its songs. He began working on it in the fall of 1993. Palmieri wanted to record without vocalists, and with the three horn players taking solos; two of the horn players were ex-Jazz Messengers. Palmieri often treated the piano as a percussive instrument. Eight musicians played on Palmas.

== Critical reception ==
Professional ratings
Review scores
Source	Rating
AllMusic	4/5 stars
The Encyclopedia of Popular Music	3/5 stars
Los Angeles Times	2/4 stars
MusicHound World: The Essential Album Guide	5/5 stars
Orlando Sentinel	4/5 stars
The Province	4.5/5 stars
(The New) Rolling Stone Album Guide	3.5/5 stars

The Miami Herald deemed the album "conventional Afro-Cuban jazz, featuring driving rhythms on the bottom and boppish melodies, jazz harmonies and improvisation on top." The Philadelphia Tribune determined that Palmas "cooks from start to finish with a solid mix of mambos, cha-chas, and ballads." The Province labeled the album "infectious African-Caribbean music with unmistakable jazz roots."

The St. Petersburg Times concluded that "the hyperactive syncopation of the Latin percussionists share equal footing with the clean Cannonball Adderly-inspired melody lines." The St. Louis Post-Dispatch noted that José Claussell "takes the percussion solos and tears the rhythms apart at the same time he's putting them back together, an act of creation through destruction that all great timbales players seem able to do quite casually."

AllMusic wrote that "Palmieri typically starts off a number with familiar Latin piano patterns which quickly evolve into completely innovative chord combinations."

== Track listing ==
No.	Title	Length
1.	"Palmas"
2.	"Slowvisor"
3.	"Mare Nostrum"
4.	"You Dig"
5.	"Doctor Duck"
6.	"Bolero Dos"
7.	"Bouncer"
