= Akira Tana =

American jazz drummer (born 1952)

- Born: March 14, 1952 (age 74); San Jose, California, United States
- Genres: Jazz
- Occupation: Musician
- Instrument: Drums
- Label: Sons of Sound

Akira Tana (born March 14, 1952) is an American jazz drummer.

== Biography ==
He was born in San Jose, California, United States. Tana grew up in Palo Alto, graduating from Gunn High School in 1970. Tana then obtained a bachelor's degree from Harvard University in the social sciences, playing gigs on the side, then enrolled at the New England Conservatory of Music. There he performed in both classical and jazz idioms, playing with the Boston Symphony Orchestra and student ensembles as well as with musicians such as Helen Humes, Milt Jackson, Sonny Rollins, George Russell, and Sonny Stitt.

Tana recorded frequently as a sideman in the 1980s, and began releasing albums as a leader in the 1990s. He formed a group, Tana Reid, with Rufus Reid, and added Kei Akagi on occasion to form the Asian-American Jazz Trio. Tana's performing and recording associations include Charles Aznavour, Ran Blake, Ray Bryant, Al Cohn, Chris Connor, Art Farmer, Carl Fontana, Dizzy Gillespie, Benny Golson, Jim Hall, Jimmy Heath, Major Holley, Lena Horne, J.J. Johnson, Warne Marsh, Tete Montoliu, James Moody, Spike Robinson, Jimmy Rowles, Zoot Sims, Cedar Walton, and Frank Wess.

== Discography ==
=== As TanaReid ===
With Rufus Reid

- Yours and Mine (Concord Jazz, 1991)
- Passing Thoughts (Concord Jazz, 1992)
- Blue Motion (Paddle Wheel, 1993)
- Rumour with Charles Licata Rumour (Charles Publishing, 1995)
- Looking Forward (Evidence, 1995)
- Back to Front (Evidence, 1998)

=== As leader ===
- Secret Agent Men (Sons of Sound, 2002)
- Moon Over The World (Sons of Sound, 2004)
- Kiss Kiss Bang Bang with Annie Sellick (Sons of Sound, 2011)
- Sound Poetry with Ken Berman and Kai Eckhardt (Mmgmusic, 2014)
- JAZZaNOVA (Vegamusic, 2017)

=== As Akira Tana and Otonowa ===
With Masaru Koga, Saki Kono, Art Hirahara and Ken Okada

- Otonowa (Vegamusic, 2013)
- Stars Across the Ocean (Vegamusic, 2016)
- Ai San San – Love's Radiance (愛燦燦) (Vegamusic, 2019)

=== As sideman ===
With James Moody

- Sweet and Lovely (Novus, 1989)
- Honey (Novus, 1991)

With Zoot Sims

- I Wish I Were Twins (Pablo, 1981)
- Suddenly It's Spring (Pablo, 1983)

With others

- Warne Marsh, Posthumous (Interplay, 1985)
- Claudio Roditi, Claudio! (Uptown, 1985)
- Jim Hall, Jim Hall's Three (Concord Jazz, 1986)
- Chris Connor, Classic (Contemporary, 1987)
- Spike Robinson – Al Cohn Quintet, Henry B. Meets Alvin G. 'Once In A Wild' (Capri, 1987)
- Rob Schneiderman, New Outlook (Reservoir, 1988)
- J.J. Johnson, Vivian (Concord Jazz, 1992)
- Tete Montoliu, A Spanish Treasure (Concord Jazz, 1992)

== Other sources ==
- "Akira Tana". The New Grove Encyclopedia of Popular Music (accessed via Oxford Music Online).
