= Brian Lynch (musician) =

American jazz trumpeter (born 1956)

Brian Lynch (September 12, 1956) is an American jazz trumpeter. He has been a member of Eddie Palmieri's Afro-Caribbean Jazz group and has led the Latin Side of Miles project with trombonist Conrad Herwig.

Lynch has worked with Buena Vista Social Club alumnus Barbarito Torres, recorded with dance remixers Joe Claussell, Little Louie Vega and the Latin alternative group Yerba Buena. He arranged for Japanese pop star Mika Nakashima and producer Shinichi Osawa, has written string charts for Phil Woods, and has played with Maxwell, Prince, and Sheila E.

== Early life and education ==
Lynch was born in Urbana, Illinois. He grew up in Milwaukee, Wisconsin, and attended Nicolet High School. Lynch apprenticed with pianist Buddy Montgomery and organist Melvin Rhyne, while earning a degree from the Wisconsin Conservatory of Music.

== Career ==
While living in San Diego in 1980 and 1981, Lynch performed in a group with Charles McPherson.

Lynch moved to New York in late 1981 and was hired by Bill Kirchner, performing and recording with Kirchner's nonet. He was a member of the Horace Silver Quintet (1982–1985) and the Toshiko Akiyoshi Jazz Orchestra (1982–1988). Simultaneously, he played and recorded on the Latin scene with salsa bandleader Angel Canales (1982–83) and Hector LaVoe (1983–87). He began his association with Eddie Palmieri in 1987, and at the end of 1988 joined what turned out to be the final edition of Art Blakey and the Jazz Messengers. He began his association with Phil Woods in 1992, and also worked frequently with Benny Golson around this time.

=== Projects ===
In 1986, Lynch recorded his first album as a leader, Peer Pressure, for Criss Cross, followed by Back Room Blues and At the Main Event (Criss Cross), In Process (Ken Music), Keep Your Circle Small (Sharp Nine)), and a string of sideman dates with Art Blakey and Phil Woods.

Spheres of Influence (Sharp Nine, 1997) became the first of several Lynch projects displaying a strong Afro-Cuban influence. He worked with Eddie Palmieri's Afro-Caribbean Jazz Octet on Arete, Palmas and Vortex (Nonesuch and RMM). As the '90s progressed, he collaborated with Palmieri as an arranger, co-composer and musical director. Palmieri collaborated with Lynch again on Simpático, his album for ArtistShare.

Lynch has collaborated with drummers Dafnis Prieto, Horacio Hernandez, Robby Ameen, and Ernesto Simpson; percussionists Richie Flores, Pedro Martinez, and Roberto Quintero; pianists Luis Perdomo, Edsel Gomez, Manuel Valera, and David Kikoski; bassists John Benitez, Ruben Rodriguez, and Hans Glawischnig; and saxophonists Miguel Zenón and Yosvany Terry.

On February 11, 2007, Lynch and Eddie Palmieri won the Grammy Award for Best Latin Jazz Album for Simpático at the 49th Annual Grammy Awards in Los Angeles.

On January 27, 2020, Lynch and the Brian Lynch Big Band won the Grammy Award for Best Large Jazz Ensemble Album for the album, The Omni-American Book Club.

=== Teaching ===
Lynch holds faculty positions at University of Miami, New York University, and the North Netherlands Conservatory. He has taught at the Stanford Jazz Workshop, and conducted workshops in numerous major institutes of learning, including the Eastman School of Music, Dartmouth College, the University of North Texas College of Music, and Columbia University.

== Discography ==
- 1986 Peer Pressure (Criss Cross)
- 1989 Back Room Blues (Criss Cross)
- 1991 In Process (Ken)
- 1994 At the Main Event (Criss Cross)
- 1995 Keep Your Circle Small (Sharp Nine)
- 1997 Spheres of Influence (Sharp Nine)
- 2000 Tribute to the Trumpet Masters (Sharp Nine)
- 2001 Do That Make You Mad? (Disk Union)
- 2003 Fuschia/Red (Cellar Live)
- 2004 Brian Lynch Meets Bill Charlap (Sharp Nine)
- 2005 24/7 (Nagel Heyer)
- 2005 Conclave (Criss Cross)
- 2006 Simpatico (ArtistShare)
- 2009 Damian With Brian Lynch and Friends (D&R)
- 2010 Bolero Nights: For Billie Holiday (Venus)
- 2011 Conclave, Vol. 2 (Criss Cross)
- 2011 Unsung Heroes
- 2013 Unsung Heroes, Vol. 2 (CD Baby)
- 2014 Questioned Answer
- 2016 Madera Latino: A Latin Jazz Interpretation on the Music of Woody Shaw
- 2019 The Omni-American Book Club

With Art Blakey

- Chippin' In (Timeless, 1990)
- One for All (A&M, 1990)

With Ralph Moore

- Round Trip (Reservoir, 1985 [1987])

With Mark Murphy

- Beauty and the Beast (Muse, 1986)

With Herb Robertson

- Shades of Bud Powell (JMT, 1988)

With Eddie Palmieri

- Sueño (Intuition Records, 1989)
- Palmas (Electra Nonesuch, 1994)
- Arete (RMM Records, 1995)
- Vortex (RMM Records, 1996)
- La Perfecta II (Concord Records, 2001)
- Ritmo Caliente (Concord Records, 2003)
- Listen Here! (Concord Records, 2005)
- Full Circle (Uprising Records, 2018)
- Mi Luz Mayor (Uprising Records, 2018)

With India & Eddie Palmieri

- Llegó La India via Eddie Palmieri (RMM Records, 1992)

With Tito Puente & Eddie Palmieri

- Masterpiece/Obra Maestra (RMM Records, 2000)

With Roberto Magris

- Live in Miami @ The WDNA Jazz Gallery (JMood Records, 2018)

With Rob Schneiderman

- Radio Waves (Reservoir, 1991)

With Phil Woods

- An Affair To Remember (Evidence, 1995)
