= Eddie Palmieri =

American musician (1936–2025)

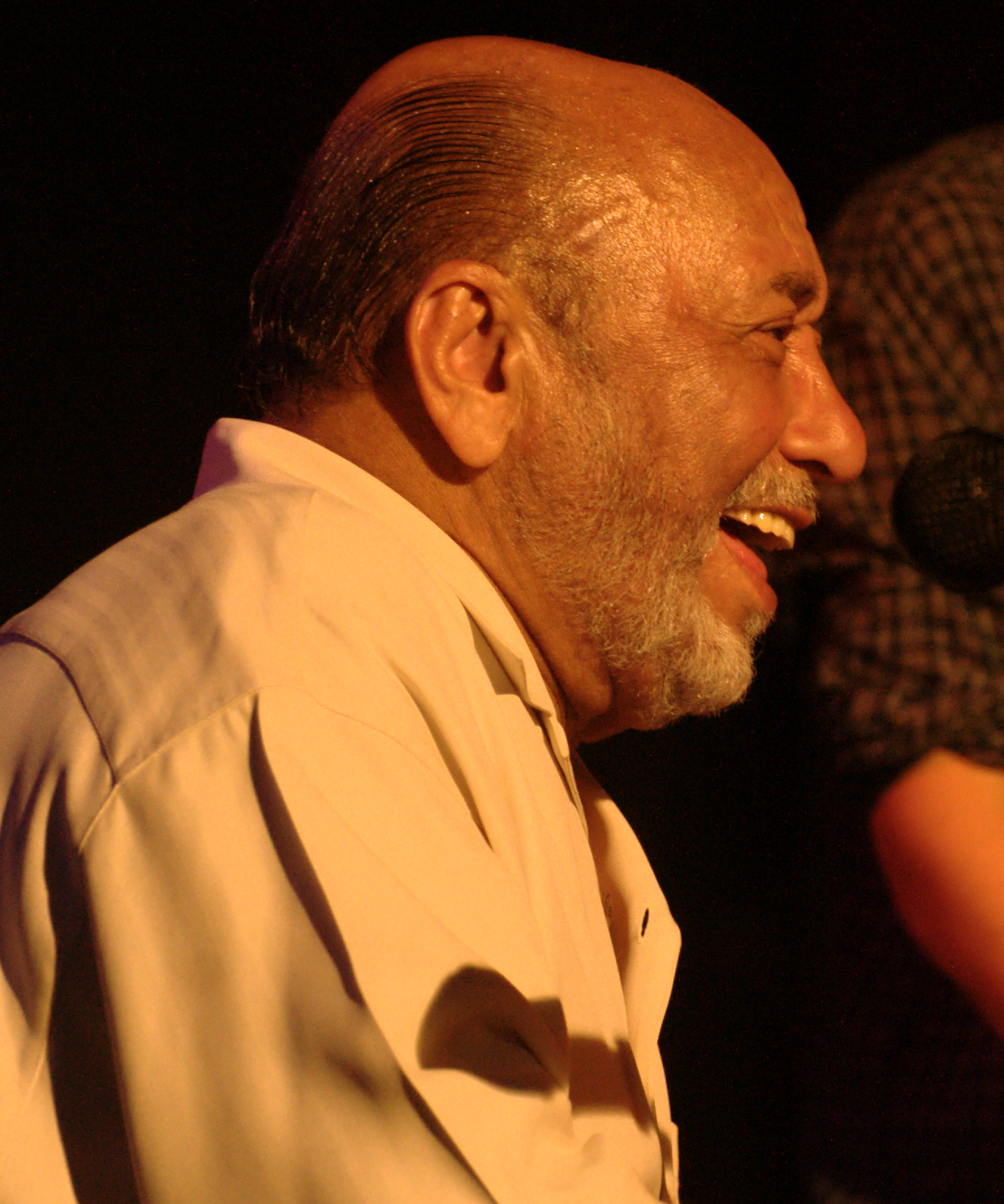
- Palmieri performing in 2013

Background information
- Born: December 15, 1936; New York City, U.S.
- Died: August 6, 2025 (aged 88) Hackensack, New Jersey, U.S.
- Genres: Latin jazz; salsa
- Occupations: Musician; bandleader; composer
- Instrument: Piano
- Years active: 1955–2025
- Labels: Ropeadope; Fania; Alegre; Tico; RMM; Concord Picante
- Website: www.palmierimusic.com

Eduardo Palmieri (December 15, 1936 – August 6, 2025) was an American musician, bandleader, and composer of Puerto Rican heritage. He was the founder of the bands La Perfecta (1961), La Perfecta II (2002), and Harlem River Drive (1970).

== Early life ==
Eduardo Palmieri was born on December 15, 1936 in Manhattan, New York City; his parents were Isabel Maldonado and Carlos Manuel Palmieri, Puerto Ricans from Ponce who had settled in the South Bronx in 1925 and 1926 respectively. He had an elder brother, Charlie Palmieri, who he accompanied and participated in talent contests with when he was young. He was partially of Corsican descent.

Palmieri continued his education in the New York City public school system, where he was constantly exposed to jazz music. He took piano lessons and performed at Carnegie Hall at the age of eleven. Influenced by Thelonious Monk and McCoy Tyner, and inspired by his older brother, he determined to someday form his own band, which he accomplished in 1950 at fourteen years old. During the 1950s, Palmieri played in several bands including Tito Rodríguez's orchestra.

== Career ==
In 1961, Palmieri founded the band Conjunto La Perfecta, which featured singer Ismael Quintana, during the height of popularity of Pachanga, a variety of Charanga ensemble music. Charangas typically employed violins and flute; Palmieri replaced the violins with trombones to produce a more forceful sound, which Eddie's brother Charlie dubbed the "trobanga". Personnel included Barry Rogers on trombone, George Castro on flute, Manny Oquendo on bongos and timbales, Tommy López on congas, and Dave Pérez on bass. What became known as "the Palmieri sound," which incorporated jazz and a Cuban rhythm called Mozambique, influenced the music of Willie Colón and other bandleaders.

In 1964 or 1965, Rogers introduced Palmieri to the work of John Coltrane and pianist McCoy Tyner, who became a mentor and inspiration to Palmieri. In the late 1960s, the singer Bob Bianco introduced Palmieri to the Schillinger system, which informed his subsequent approach to composition.

Palmieri experimented by employing a jazz aesthetic both in live performance and on his recordings based on the Cuban "descarga" (jam session) concept. He "opened up" the arrangements by featuring his band members as soloists. In addition, he began incorporating a newly developed post-Castro revolution Cuban rhythm known as mozambique on his 1966 album "Mambo Con Conga Is Mozambique." Discontent among several members led to them leaving in 1968. Palmieri reformed the band with legendary Cuban trumpeter Alfredo "Chocolate" Armenteros, timbalero Nicky Marrero, conguero Eladio Pérez, bongocero Tomás "Choki" López, and bassist Andy González. leading to the 1970 now classic album, Superimposition, which features two of his best known instrumental Afro-Cuban/Latin jazz compositions, 17.1 and Helado De Chocloate (Chocolate Ice Cream),

In 1971, Palmieri recorded "Vamonos Pa'l Monte" ("Let's go to the Mountain") with his older brother by nine years, Charlie (another piano virtuoso) playing organ and Eddie being the first salsa pianist to record on the Fender Rhodes electric piano. That same year, he also recorded Eddie Palmieri & Friends in Concert, at the University of Puerto Rico. In 1975, Palmieri won the first Grammy Award given in the newly established category, Best Latin Recording, with The Sun of Latin Music produced by Harvey Averne. The album was arranged by René Hernández (long-time pianist with the Machito Orchestra), and Barry Rogers who provided stellar ideas for the lengthy experimental piece he arranged, "Un Día Bonito," which opened with Palmieri doing an extended avant garde free piano solo. On July 21, 1979, he appeared at the Amandla Festival along with Bob Marley, Dick Gregory and Patti LaBelle, among others.

In the 1980s, Ismael Quintana returned to the band, which also included Cheo Feliciano. Palmieri won two Grammys for the recordings of Palo Pa' Rumba and Solito. He also recorded the album La Verdad (The Truth) with salsa singer Tony Vega in 1987. The next year, his brother Charlie died suddenly.

In the 1990s, Palmieri had participated in various concerts and recordings with the Fania All-Stars and the Tico All-Stars; he also introduced La India with the production of Llegó La India via Eddie Palmieri (La India has arrived via Eddie Palmieri), released in 1992. In 1998, Palmieri received an honorary doctorate from the Berklee College of Music. In 2000, Palmieri announced his retirement from the world of music. However, he recorded Masterpiece with Tito Puente and won two Grammys; additionally, he was also named the "Outstanding Producer of the Year" by the National Foundation of Popular Culture. Palmieri has won a total of 9 Grammy Awards during his career, most recently for his 2006 album Simpático. On November 6, 2004, Palmieri directed a "Big Band Tribute" to his late brother Charlie at Avery Fisher Hall at the Lincoln Center for the Performing Arts.

=== La Perfecta ===
Palmieri's La Perfecta departed from the traditional Cuban sources of salsa instrumentation by introducing a new stylistic device into the New York Latin sound. Their signature sound relied heavily on two trombones and a flute instead of trumpets. On the liner notes of their first album, Eddie's brother Charlie dubbed this combination the 'trombanga', referring to the trombones and the still popular charanga which typically featured the flute. The combination helped to give La Perfecta a rich and bold sound which contributed to Palmieri's success with his new band. The trombone-based conjunto sound was later adopted by salsa band leaders Willie Colón and Manny Oquendo, among others.

Palmieri formed a new band, La Perfecta II, with whom he recorded the CD Ritmo Caliente (Hot Rhythm). On April 30, 2005, "Mi Día Bonito", a tribute to Eddie Palmieri celebrating his 50 years in the world of music, took place at the Rubén Rodríguez Coliseum in Bayamón, Puerto Rico. The event included the participation of Lalo Rodríguez, Ismael Quintana, Cheo Feliciano, La India, Hermán Olivera, Jerry Medina, Luis Vergara, and Wichy Camacho.

In November and December 2005, Palmieri teamed up with longtime trumpeter and band member Brian Lynch to record the Artistshare CD release The Brian Lynch/Eddie Palmieri Project: Simpático. This CD and accompanying multimedia web site features music by an all-star roster of jazz and Latin jazz artists, including Phil Woods, Lila Downs, Donald Harrison, Conrad Herwig, Giovanni Hidalgo, Gregory Tardy, Mario Rivera, Boris Kozlov, Rubén Rodríguez, Luques Curtis, Robby Ameen, Dafnis Prieto, Pedro Martínez, Johnny Rivero, Edsel Gómez, and Yosvany Terry. In 2007, the recording was awarded a Grammy as the best Latin Jazz Recording.

=== Other work ===
Palmieri returned to the studio to record three songs for the soundtrack to Doin' it in the Park: Pickup Basketball NYC. The documentary, co-directed by Bobbito García and Kevin Couliau, explores the relationship between NYC playgrounds, basketball, arts, and culture.

In 2022, Palmieri appeared in a feature-length documentary titled Santos - Skin to Skin.

In 2025, Palmieri appeared in the Spike Lee feature-length film Highest 2 Lowest performing multiple songs with the film alternating between his performance and an extended action sequence. This was his final film appearance before his death.

To his credit, Palmieri never called the music he produced salsa. He had this in common with Tito Puente. The term salsa is much despised by many. It is a term created to increase the commercialization of New York Latin music.

== Death ==
Palmieri died at his residence in Hackensack, New Jersey, on August 6, 2025, at the age of 88.

== Discography ==
- La Perfecta (Alegre, 1962)
- El molestoso (Alegre, 1963)
- Lo que traigo es sabroso (Alegre, 1964)
- Echando pa'lante (Straight Ahead) (Tico, 1964)
- Azúcar pa' ti (Sugar for You) (Tico, 1965)
- Mambo con conga es Mozambique (Tico, 1965)
- El Sonido Nuevo (Verve, 1966) – with Cal Tjader
- Bamboléate (Tico, 1967) – with Cal Tjader
- Molasses (Tico, 1967)
- Champagne (Tico, 1968)
- Justicia (Tico, 1969)
- Superimposition (Tico, 1970)
- Vamonos pa'l monte (Tico, 1971)
- In Concert at the University of Puerto Rico (Coco, 1971)
- Harlem River Drive (Roulette, 1971) – with Harlem River Drive
- Recorded Live at Sing Sing Vol. 1 (Tico, 1972) – with Harlem River Drive
- Recorded Live at Sing Sing Vol. 2 (Tico, 1972, released 1974)
- Sentido (Coco/Mango, 1973)
- Sun of Latin Music (Coco, 1974) – with Lalo Rodríguez
- Unfinished Masterpiece (Coco, 1975)
- Eddie's Concerto (Tico, 1976)
- Festival 76 (Coco, 1976)
- Lucumí, Macumba, Voodoo (Epic, 1978)
- Eddie Palmieri (Barbaro, 1980)
- Timeless (Coco, 1981)
- Palo pa' rumba (Musica Latina International, 1984)
- Solito (Musica Latina International, 1985)
- The Truth / La verdad (Fania, 1987)
- Sueño (Intuition, 1989)
- Llegó La India Via Eddie Palmieri (Soho Sounds, 1992) – with La India
- Palmas (Elektra Nonesuch, 1994)
- Arete (RMM, 1995)
- Vortex (1996)
- El rumbero del piano (RMM, 1998)
- Live (1999)
- Masterpiece / Obra maestra (RMM/Universal, 2000) – with Tito Puente
- En Vivo Italia (2002)
- La Perfecta II (Concord, 2002)
- Ritmo caliente (Concord Picante, 2003)
- Listen Here! (Concord Picante, 2005)
- Simpático (ArtistShare, 2006) – with Brian Lynch
- Eddie Palmieri Is Doin' It in the Park (2013)
- Sabiduría / Wisdom (2017)
- Full Circle (Uprising, 2018)
- Mi Luz Mayor (2018)

== See also ==
- List of Puerto Ricans
- Corsican immigration to Puerto Rico
- Charlie Palmieri
