= Rufus Reid =

American bassist, educator, and composer

- Born: February 10, 1944 (age 82); Atlanta, Georgia, U.S.
- Origin: Chicago, Illinois
- Genre: Jazz
- Occupation: Musician
- Instrument: Bass
- Years active: 1976–present
- Labels: Motéma, Sunnyside, Atlantic, Soul Note, Evidence, Concord
- Website: www.rufusreid.com

Rufus Reid (born February 10, 1944, in Atlanta, Georgia) is an American jazz bassist, educator, and composer.

== Biography ==
Reid was raised in Sacramento, California, where he played the trumpet through junior high and high school. Upon graduation from Sacramento High School, he entered the United States Air Force as a trumpet player. During that period, he began to be seriously interested in the double bass.

After fulfilling his duties in the military, Rufus had decided he wanted to pursue a career as a professional bassist. He moved to Seattle, Washington, where he studied bass with James Harnett of the Seattle Symphony. He continued his education at Northwestern University in Evanston, Illinois, where he studied with Warren Benfield and principal bassist, Joseph Guastefeste, both of the Chicago Symphony. He graduated in 1971 with a Bachelor of Music Degree as a Performance Major on the Double Bass.

Rufus Reid's major professional career began in Chicago and continues since 1976 in New York City. Playing with hundreds of the world's greatest musicians, he is famously the bassist that saxophonist Dexter Gordon chose when he returned to the states from his decade-long exile in Denmark. His colleagues include Thad Jones, Nancy Wilson, Eddie Harris, and Bob Berg.

Reid directed the Jazz Studies program at William Paterson University from 1979 to 1999. After retiring from that position, he spent five years attending the weekly BMI Jazz Composer's Workshop in New York City. Reid has also served on the faculty of the biannual Milt Hinton Institute for Studio Bass, which moved to Montclair State University in 2024.

At the 57th Annual Grammy Awards in 2015, Reid received two nominations: Best Large Jazz Ensemble Album for Quiet Pride: The Elizabeth Catlett Project and Best Instrumental Composition for "Recognition," a track from the same album. "Reid’s book, The Evolving Bassist, in publication since 1974, remains the industry standard for double bass methodology".

Reid has been a resident of Teaneck, New Jersey.

Reid's double bass is a Josef Rieger circa 1805.

== Discography ==
=== As leader ===
- Perpetual Stroll (Theresa, 1980)
- Mirth Song, with Harold Danko (Sunnyside, 1982)
- Too Marvelous for Words, with Joe Carter (Empathy, 1982)
- Seven Minds (Sunnyside, 1984)
- Corridor To The Limits (Sunnyside, 1989)
- Song for Luis, with Ron Jackson (Mastermix, 1996)
- Double Bass Delights, with Michael Moore (Double-Time, 1996)
- Intimacy of the Bass, with Michael Moore (Double-Time, 1999)
- Alone Together, with Peter Ind (Wave, 2000)
- The Gait Keeper (Sunnyside, 2003)
- Live at the Kennedy Center (Motéma, 2007)
- Out Front (Motéma, 2009)
- Hues of a Different Blue (Motéma, 2011)
- Quiet Pride: The Elizabeth Catlett Project (Motéma, 2014)
- Terrestrial Dance, Rufus Reid Trio with the Sirius Quartet (Newvelle Records, 2017 - Vinyl only)
- Always in the Moment, with Sullivan Fortner (Newvelle, 2020)
- Celebration, Rufus Reid Trio with the Sirius Quartet (Sunnyside, 2022)
- It's the Nights I Like, with Sullivan Fortner (Sunnyside, 2024)

=== As TanaReid ===
With Akira Tana

- Yours and Mine (Concord Jazz, 1991)
- Passing Thoughts (Concord Jazz, 1992)
- Blue Motion (Paddle Wheel, 1993)
- Rumour with Charles Licata Rumour (Charles Publishing, 1995)
- Looking Forward (Evidence, 1995)
- Back to Front (Evidence, 1998)

=== As sideman ===
With Kenny Barron

- Autumn in New York (Uptown, 1984)
- The Moment (Reservoir, 1991)
- Other Places (Verve, 1993)
- Spirit Song (Verve, 1999)

With Jane Ira Bloom

- Art and Aviation (Arabesque, 1992)
- The Nearness (Arabesque, 1996)

With Kenny Burrell

- Listen to the Dawn (Muse, 1980 [1983])
- Ellington a la Carte (Muse, 1983 [1993])
- A la Carte (Muse, 1983 [1985])
- Sunup to Sundown (Contemporary, 1991)

With Donald Byrd

- Harlem Blues (Landmark, 1987)
- A City Called Heaven (Landmark, 1991)

With George Cables

- Circle (Contemporary, 1979 [1985])
- A Letter to Dexter (Kind of Blue, 2006)

With Art Farmer

- Nostalgia (Baystate, 1983) with Benny Golson
- You Make Me Smile (Soul Note, 1984)
- Something to Live For: The Music of Billy Strayhorn (Contemporary, 1987)
- Blame It on My Youth (Contemporary, 1988)
- Ph.D. (Contemporary, 1989)

With Ricky Ford

- Tenor for the Times (Muse, 1981)
- Shorter Ideas (Muse, 1984)

With Frank Foster and Frank Wess

- Two for the Blues (Pablo, 1984)
- Frankly Speaking (Concord, 1985)

With Stan Getz

- Anniversary! (EmArcy, 1987 [1989])
- Serenity (Emarcy, 1987 [1991])

With Dexter Gordon

- The Chase! (Prestige, 1970) with Gene Ammons
- Manhattan Symphonie (1978)

With Eddie Harris

- Instant Death (Atlantic, 1971)
- Eddie Harris Sings the Blues (Atlantic, 1972)
- Excursions (Atlantic, 1966–73)
- Is It In (Atlantic, 1973)
- I Need Some Money (Atlantic, 1974)
- Bad Luck Is All I Have (Atlantic, 1975)

With Andrew Hill

- Shades (1986)
- Eternal Spirit (1989)

With J. J. Johnson

- Quintergy (1988)
- Standards (1988)
- Let's Hang Out (1992)
- The Brass Orchestra (1996)
- Heroes (1998)

With Lee Konitz

- Figure & Spirit (Progressive, 1976)
- Ideal Scene (1986)

With Rob Schneiderman

- New Outlook (Reservoir, 1988)
- Smooth Sailing (Reservoir, 1990)

With The Thad Jones/ Mel Lewis Orchestra

- It Only Happens Every Time (1977)
- The Thad Jones Mel Lewis Quartet (Artists House, 1978)

With others

- Roni Ben-Hur, Fortuna (2008)
- Jack DeJohnette, Album Album (ECM, 1984)
- Dan Faulk, Focusing In (Criss Cross Jazz, 1992)
- Hal Galper, Naturally (Blackhawk, 1987)
- Benny Golson, Benny Golson Quartet (LRC Ltd. 1990)
- Barry Harris, For the Moment (Uptown, 1985)
- Jimmy Heath, New Picture (Landmark, 1985)
- Bobby Hutcherson, Cruisin' the 'Bird (Landmark, 1988)
- The Jazztet, Nostalgia (Baystate, 1983)
- Etta Jones, My Mother's Eyes (Muse, 1977)
- Frank Kimbrough, Monk's Dreams: The Complete Compositions of Thelonious Sphere Monk (Sunnyside, 2018)
- Kirk Lightsey, From Kirk to Nat (Criss Cross Jazz, 1991)
- Maulawi, Maulawi (Strata)
- Billy Mitchell, De Lawd's Blues (Xanadu, 1980)
- Tete Montoliu, A Spanish Treasure (Concord Jazz, 1991)
- Ralph Moore, Round Trip (Reservoir, 1985 [1987])
- Joe Newman and Joe Wilder, Hangin' Out (Concord Jazz, 1984)
- Claudio Roditi, Claudio! (Uptown, 1985)
- Michel Sardaby, Going Places (Sound Hills, 1989)
- Jack Sheldon, Playing for Change (Uptown, 1986 [1997])
- John Stubblefield, Confessin' (Soul Note, 1984)
- Jon Irabagon, The Observer (2009)
- Geoff Keezer, Waiting In The Wings (Sunnyside, 1989)

== Books ==
- The Evolving Bassist (1974) (2nd edition: ISBN 978-0-9676015-0-2)

== Contributions to education ==
- Jamey Aebersold Summer Jazz Workshops
- Stanford Jazz Workshop
- The Lake Placid Institute
- Professor Emeritus, William Paterson University, Jazz Studies and Performance program (1979–1999)
- The "Richard Davis Foundation for Young Bassists" Annual Bass Conference
- The Sligo Jazz Project
- Bass Coalition Summer Workshop
- Milt Hinton Institute for Studio Bass

== Awards and honors ==
- 1997 Humanitarian Award, International Association for Jazz Education (IAJE)
- 1998 Jazz Educator Achievement Award, Bass Player
- 1999 Outstanding Educator, New Jersey Chapter of the IAJE
- 2001 Distinguished Achievement Award, International Society of Bassists
- 2005 Mellon Jazz Living Legacy Award, Mid Atlantic Arts Foundation
- 2006 Award, Raymond and Beverly Sackler Composition Competition, administered by University of Connecticut
- 2006 Fellowship, New Jersey State Council on the Arts
- 2006 ASCAP/IAJE Strayhorn Commission Recipient
- 2008 Guggenheim Fellowship, Creative Arts/Music Composition category
- Charlie Parker Jazz Composition Award ("Skies Over Emilia")
