= Ralph Moore =

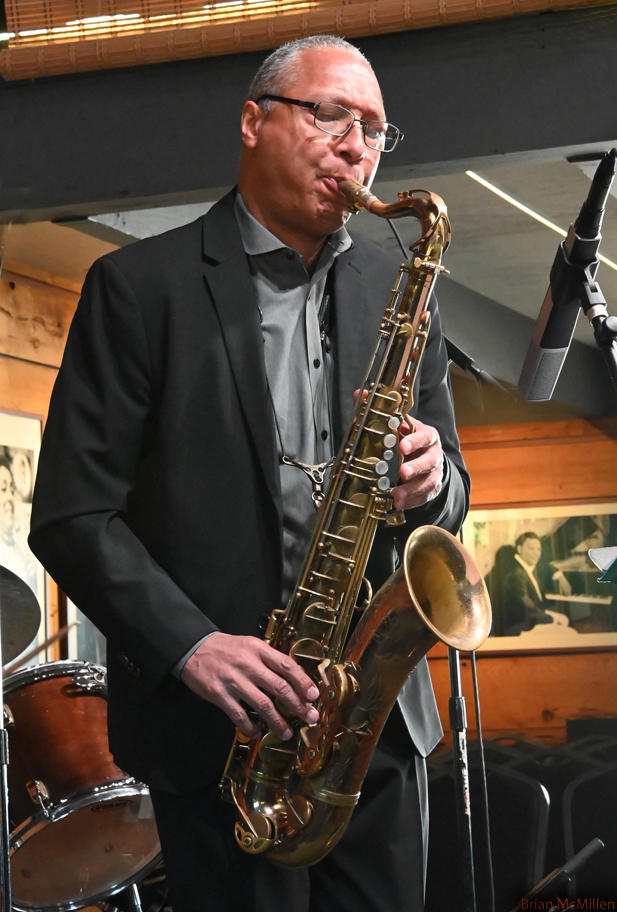

Background information
- Born: 24 December 1956 (age 69); Brixton, London, England
- Genre: Jazz
- Occupation: Musician
- Instrument: Saxophone
- Years active: 1981–present
- Labels: Reservoir, Criss Cross, Landmark, Savoy

Ralph Moore (born 24 December 1956) is an English jazz saxophonist.

== Early life ==
Moore was born in Brixton, London, England. His mother was the dancer Josie Woods, and his father was in the US military. He spent his childhood in Brixton, and after trying various instruments, took up the tenor saxophone at the age of 14.

In 1972, he moved to Santa Maria, California, to live with his father. His mother had not wanted him to grow up in Brixton. "Around 1975 he moved to Boston, where he played locally and attended the Berklee College of Music."

== Later life and career ==
Moore began his professional career with a tour of Scandinavia in 1979. He moved to New York the following year. He was part of Horace Silver's band from 1981 to 1985, including for tours of Europe and Japan, and recordings. He then played with numerous musicians, including Roy Haynes (around 1982–86), Darrell Grant (1986–87), Dizzy Gillespie's reunion band (1987), Freddie Hubbard (around 1987–91), and Gene Harris (1989–90).

Moore's first recording as leader was for Reservoir Records in 1985. He subsequently recorded for Landmark, Criss Cross, and Savoy. Starting in 1995, he was part of Kevin Eubanks's band for The Tonight Show.

== Discography ==
=== As leader ===
- 1985: Round Trip (Reservoir, 1987)
- 1987: 623 C Street (Criss Cross, 1987)
- 1988: Rejuvenate! (Criss Cross, 1989)
- 1988: Images (Landmark, 1989)
- 1990: Furthermore (Landmark, 1990)
- 1993: Who It Is You Are (Savoy, 1994)
- 2016: Three Score (WJ3, 2018)

=== As sideman ===
With Kenny Barron

- Invitation (Criss Cross Jazz, 1991)

With Steve Davis

- We See (Smoke Sessions, 2024)

With Roy Hargrove

- Diamond in the Rough (Novus/RCA, 1990)

With Billy Hart

- Rah (Gramavision, 1988)

With Roy Haynes

- True or False (Freelance, 1986)

With Freddie Hubbard

- Bolivia (Music Masters, 1991)

With Bobby Hutcherson

- Cruisin' the 'Bird (Landmark, 1988)

With Jimmy Knepper

- Dream Dancing (Criss Cross, 1986)

With Oscar Peterson

- Oscar Peterson Meets Roy Hargrove and Ralph Moore (Telarc, 1996)

With Valery Ponomarev

- Means of Identification (Reservoir, 1985 [1987])
- Trip to Moscow (Reservoir, 1987)

With Ben Riley

- Weaver of Dreams (Joken, 1996)

With Rob Schneiderman

- Radio Waves (Reservoir, 1991)
- Dark Blue (Reservoir, 1994)

With Superblue

- Superblue 2 (Blue Note, 1989)

With Cedar Walton

- Mosaic (Music Masters, 1990 [1992]) as Eastern Rebellion
- Simple Pleasure (Music Masters, 1993) as Eastern Rebellion
- Composer (Astor Place, 1996)

With Ray Brown

- Moore Makes Four (Concord Jazz, 1991)
- Some of my best friends are the sax players (Telarc, 1996)
