= Reservoir Records =

- Founded: 1987
- Founder: Mark Feldman; Kayla Feldman
- Genre: Jazz
- Country of origin: U.S.
- Location: Kingston, New York
- Official website: www.reservoirmusic.com

Reservoir Records is jazz record label founded in 1987 by Mark and Kayla Feldman, with special attention given to a piano series. Its catalogue includes music by Kenny Barron, Nick Brignola, Steve Kuhn, Hod O'Brien, Claudio Roditi, Pepper Adams, Tommy Flanagan, Al Grey, Peter Leitch, J. R. Monterose, Ralph Moore, Valery Ponomarev, Joe Puma, Don Sickler, and Buddy Tate.

== Artists ==
- Kenny Barron
- Steve Kuhn
- Claudio Roditi
- John Hicks
- Helio Alves
- Dick Katz
- Nick Brignola
- Valery Ponomarev
- Gary Smulyan
- Ralph Moore
- J. R. Monterose
- Joe Puma
- Dick Berk
- Jon Mayer
- John Fedchock
- Don Sickler
- Roni Ben-Hur
- Peter Leitch

== Discography ==
Catalog	Artist	Album
101	Ponomarev, Valery	Means of Identification
102	Puma, Joe	Shining Hour
103	Leitch, Peter	Red Zone
104	Moore, Ralph	Round Trip
105	Levy, Jed	Good People
106	Schneiderman, Rob	New Outlook
107	Ponomarev, Valery	Trip to Moscow
108	Brignola, Nick	Raincheck
109	Monterose, J.R.	...And a Little Pleasure [reissue of Uptown LP]
110	Tate, Buddy & Al Grey	Just Jazz [reissue of Uptown LP]
111	Sickler, Don	The Music of Kenny Dorham
112	Brignola, Nick	On a Different Level
113	Adams, Pepper	Conjuration: Fat Tuesday's Session
114	Schneiderman, Rob	Smooth Sailing
115	Barron, Kenny	The Only One
116	O'Brien, Hod	Ridin' High
117	Brignola, Nick	What It Takes
118	Leitch, Peter	Exhilaration
119	Ponomarev, Valery	Profile
120	Schneiderman, Rob	Radio Waves
121	Barron, Kenny	The Moment
122	Berk, Dick	Let's Cool One
123	Brignola, Nick	It's Time
124	McShann, Jay & John Hicks	The Missouri Connection
125	Brignola, Nick	Live at Sweet Basil, First Set
126	Schneiderman, Rob	Standards
127	Katz, Dick	3-Way Play
128	Berk, Dick	East Coast Stroll
129	Leitch, Peter	Special Rapport, A
130	Hicks, John	Beyond Expectations
131	Ponomarev, Valery	Live at Sweet Basil
132	Schneiderman, Rob	Dark Blue
133	Roditi, Claudio	Like Old Times
134	Leitch, Peter & John Hicks	Duality
135	Collins, Jay	Uncommon Threads
136	Roditi, Claudio	Free Wheelin'
137	Palmer, Jeff	Shades of the Pine
138	Fedchock, John	New York Big Band
139	Roditi, Claudio	Samba Manhattan Style
140	Leitch, Peter	Colours & Dimensions
141	Katz, Dick	The Line Forms Here
142	Collins, Jay	Reality Tonic
143	Berk, Dick	One by One
144	Schneiderman, Rob	Keepin' in the Groove
145	Brignola, Nick	The Flight of the Eagle
146	Leitch, Peter	Up Front
147	Malinverni, Pete	This Time
148	Roditi, Claudio	Double Standards
149	Boiarsky, Andres	Into the Light
150	Ponomarev, Valery	A Star for You
151	Brignola, Nick	Poinciana
152	Schneiderman, Rob	Dancing in the Dark
153	Fedchock, John	On the Edge
154	Kuhn, Steve	Dedication
155	O'Brien, Hod	So That's How It Is
156	Alves, Helio	Trios
157	Kuhn, Steve	Countdown
158	Malinverni, Pete	A Very Good Year
159	Brignola, Nick	All Business
160	Leitch, Peter	Blues On the Corner
162	Kuhn, Steve	The Best Things
167	Ben-Hur, Roni	Anna's Dance
168	Brignola, Nick	Tour de Force
169	Mayer, Jon	Full Circle
170	Fedchock, John	No Nonsense
171	Malinverni, Pete	Autumn in New York
172	Smulyan, Gary	The Real Deal
173	Harris, Barry	Live in New York
174	Brignola, Nick	Things Ain't What They Used to Be
177	Malinverni, Pete	The Tempest
