= Scott Colley =

American jazz double bassist and composer

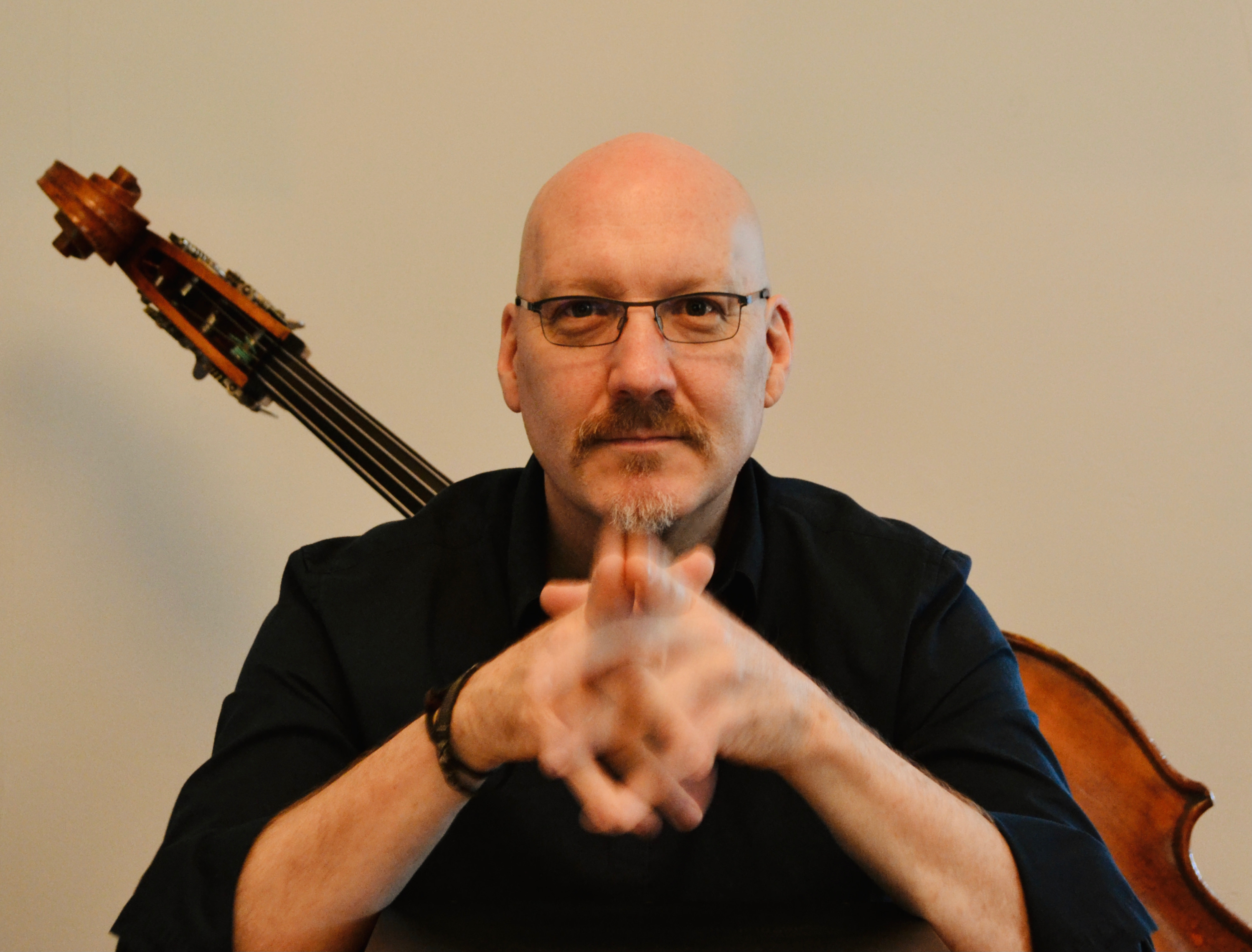

Background information
- Born: Scott Stephen Colley; November 24, 1963 (age 62); Pasadena, California, U.S.
- Genre: Jazz
- Occupations: Musician; Composer
- Instrument: Double bass
- Years active: 1988–present
- Labels: Criss Cross; SteepleChase; Palmetto; CAM Jazz
- Website: scottcolley.com

Scott Colley (born November 24, 1963) is an American jazz double bassist and composer. As of 2024, he had been nominated for 4 Grammy Awards, including Best Jazz Instrumental Album for Guided Tour in 2014 and Still Dreaming in 2019. During his career, he has toured, recorded, and played with musicians such as Herbie Hancock, Jim Hall, Carmen McRae, Chris Potter, Julian Lage, Brian Blade, and Pat Metheny.

== Early life and education ==
Colley was born on November 24, 1963 in Pasadena, California. He began studying bass at age 11 after his older brother Jim, a drummer, said he "thought it would be cool to have another rhythm section instrument in the family." At 13, he began studying with bassist Monty Budwig and played twice a week at a club in Pasadena, where he spent three years being mentored by musicians such as Jimmy Rowles. At Eagle Rock High School, he studied under John Rinaldo. He auditioned at California Institute of the Arts after learning that Charlie Haden taught there and was granted a full-ride scholarship. He studied with Haden and Fred Tinsley, and began touring and recording with jazz singer Carmen McRae prior to graduating in 1988. He then moved to New York City.

== Career ==
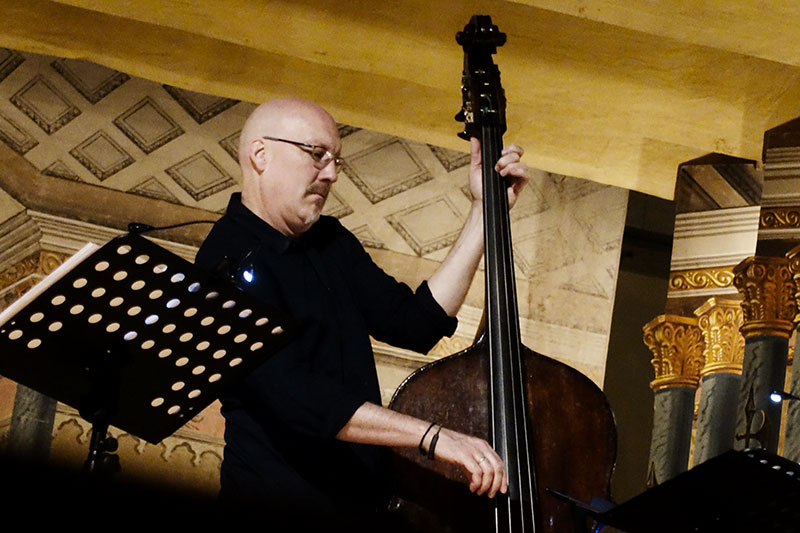
Scott Colley at Aarhus Jazz Festival 2016

In 1988 and 1989, he accompanied McRae on a tour across the US and in Tokyo. He also performed with musicians including Dizzy Gillespie and Clifford Jordan. In the 1990s, members of his touring groups included Jim Hall, John Scofield, Joe Henderson, Art Farmer, Joe Lovano, Toots Thielemans, Bobby Hutcherson, and Bob Berg. He also played extensively with Andrew Hill's Another Point of Departure sextet. In 1996, he released his debut album, Portable Universe, which featured Chris Potter and David Binney. He recorded Subliminal... (1998) with a quartet, while This Place (1997) and The Magic Line (2000) were both recorded with a trio including Potter and Bill Stewart.

Colley toured extensively as a member of Herbie Hancock's working trio for five years in the early 2000s, periodically performing alongside other music groups such as the Chicago Symphony Orchestra. He performed with two separate quartets, one with Gary Thomas and the other with Bobby Hutcherson, as well as with Andrew Hill's trio and sextet and Chris Potter's quartet. Initial Wisdom, his 2003 album release, featured Ravi Coltrane, Adam Rogers, and Bill Stewart. In 2005, he worked on the Directions in Music tour with Michael Brecker, Herbie Hancock, Roy Hargrove, and Terri Lyne Carrington. He continued performing with Jim Hall and joined a trio with Pat Metheny. Around this time, he began taking residencies at institutions including the Banff Centre, Virginia Commonwealth University, and Vallekilde Folk High School. In 2007, he toured internationally with Chris Potter and Antonio Sánchez.

In the mid-2000s, Colley recorded projects with Chris Potter, Abbey Lincoln, Luciana Souza, Kenny Werner, Adam Rogers, and Donny McCaslin. In 2007, he joined Billy Childs' Jazz-Chamber Ensemble with Brian Blade and taught a workshop at Berklee with Antonio Sánchez and Chris Potter. He also released his fourth album, Architect of the Silent Moment, in 2007. It was composed entirely by him with the exception of "Smoke Stack," which was written by Andrew Hill. The album was recorded with a quartet including Ralph Alessi, Craig Taborn, and Brian Blade with appearances by David Binney, Jason Moran, Adam Rogers, Gregoire Maret, and Antonio Sánchez. He and the core quartet began touring prior to the album being fully finished. In the late 2000s, he performed in the US, Europe, and South America with Mark Turner and Antonio Sánchez; Chris Potter's Underground; Edward Simon; the Antonio Sánchez Quartet with Sánchez, Miguel Zenón, and David Sánchez; Magic Circle with Dave Douglas and Mark Feldman; the David Binney Quartet with Binney, Craig Taborn and Brian Blade; and the Kenny Werner Quintet with Werner, Randy Brecker, David Sánchez, and Ari Hoenig. During the summer of 2010, he released Empire, an album entirely of original compositions, on CAM Jazz with longtime collaborators Bill Frisell, Alessi, Blade, and Taborn. He continued touring with Jim Hall and Joey Baron; Chris Potter; the Kenny Werner Quintet; and Michel Portal and Gary Burton and spent the summer doing a teaching residency at the Siena Summer Workshop in Siena, Italy.

Between 2011 and 2015, Colley's group lineups included a trio with Chris Potter and Antonio Sánchez; the Koppel Colley Blade Collective with Benjamin Koppel and Brian Blade; Bob James, David Sanborn, and Steve Gadd at the London Jazz Festival (2013); a trio with Julian Lage and Kenny Wollesen; the Steel House trio with Edward Simon and Brian Blade; and the Pat Metheny Trio with Metheny and Kenny Garrett and a quartet with Metheny and Gary Burton, both at the Detroit International Jazz Festival in 2015. He was also a member of the Jim Hall Trio until Hall's death in 2013. Colley appeared on Marian McPartland's Piano Jazz on NPR in 2014 with Chris Potter. Between 2016 and 2019, he played with many of the same groups: a trio with Gary Burton and Julian Lage; Chris Potter's Underground Quartet; and the Steel House. He held a residency at The Stone with the Nels Cline Four in 2016 with Nels Cline, Julian Lage, and Tom Rainey. He performed with Joshua Redman on his Still Dreaming tour in 2017 and accompanied Luciana Souza alongside Chico Pinheiro at the Portland Jazz Festival in 2018. Also in 2017, he released his next album, Seven.

In January 2020, Colley, Julian Lage, and Dave King had a six-night residency at Village Vanguard, though this was interrupted by the onset of the COVID-19 pandemic. In December, he performed via livestream on the Jazzwise Facebook page with Tim Berne and Nasheet Waits. He was back to touring the following summer, heading to Europe with Antonio Sánchez, Donny McCaslin, and Miguel Zenón. In 2022, he toured with Brian Blade and Wolfgang Muthspiel.

== Personal life ==
Colley has a daughter (born around 2002).

== Discography ==
=== As leader ===
Year recorded	Title	Label	Year released	Personnel / Notes
1996	Portable Universe	Free Lance	1996	With David Binney, Jeff Hirshfield, Donny McCaslin, Chris Potter, Kenny Werner
1997	This Place	SteepleChase	1998	With Chris Potter, Bill Stewart
1997	Subliminal...	Criss Cross Jazz	1998	With Bill Carrothers, Chris Potter, Bill Stewart
1999	The Magic Line	ArtistShare	2000	With Chris Potter, Bill Stewart
2001	Initial Wisdom	Palmetto	2002	With Ravi Coltrane, Adam Rogers, Bill Stewart
2005	Architect of the Silent Moment	CAM Jazz	2007	With Ralph Alessi, David Binney, Gregoire Maret, Jason Moran, Adam Rogers, Antonio Sánchez, Taborn
2009	Empire	CAM Jazz	2010	With Ralph Alessi, Brian Blade, Bill Frisell, Craig Taborn
2016	Seven	ArtistShare	2017	With Jonathan Finlayson, Kevin Hays, Nate Smith

=== Collaborations ===
Trio with Wolfgang Muthspiel and Brian Blade

- Angular Blues (ECM, 2020)

Trio with Benjamin Koppel and Brian Blade

- Collective (ArtistShare, 2014)
- Perspective (Cowbell Music, 2023)

Trio with Edward Simon and Brian Blade

- Steel House (ArtistShare, 2015)
- Three Visitors (GroundUP Music, 2024)

=== As sideman ===
Year released	Leader	Album	Label	Personnel / Notes
1986	Dick Berk	More Birds Less Feathers	Discovery	Brignola, Fahn, Pozzi
1986	Carmen McRae	Any Old Time	Denon	Collins, Gunnison, Jordan, Pulice
1990	Roy Hargrove	Diamond in the Rough	Novus/RCA	Fambrough, Foster, Hargrove, A. Hart, Hicks, Keezer, Moore, Peterson
1990	Judy Niemack		Free Lance	B. Hart, Hersch, Lovano
1991	Kevin Hays	El Matador	Jazz City	Henderson, S. Wilson
1991	Fred Hersch	Forward Motion	Chesky	Friedlander, Perry, Rainey
1992	Jon Gordon	The Jon Gordon Quartet	Chiaroscuro	Stewart
1992	Christopher Hollyday	And I'll Sing Once More	RCA/Novus	Charry, Clark, M. Feldman, Gardner, Haddad, Mosca, Mosello, Neumeister, Purviance, Robinson, R. Savage, Werner
1992	Carmen McRae	New York State of Mind	Victor	Gunnison, Pulice
1993	T.S. Monk	Changing of the Guard	Blue Note	Mathews, Porcelli, Sickler, Williams
1993	Judy Niemack	Straight Up	Free Lance	Bleckmann, Café, Elridge, M. Feldman, Nussbaum, Prins, Thielemans, Werner
1993	Ted Rosenthal	Images of Monk	Jazz Alliance	M. Feldman, Lynch, Oatts, Smith
1993	Steve Slagle	The Steve Slagle Quartet	SteepleChase	Hagans, Hirshfield
1994	Harold Danko	Next Age	SteepleChase	Hirshfield, Perry
1994	Roy Hargrove	Approaching Standards	BMG Music/Jazz Heritage	R. Blake, Cary, Foster, A. Hart, Hicks, Higgins, Hutchinson, Lacy, McBride, Scott, Whitaker
1994	Jazzhole	The Jazzhole	Bluemoon	Binney Bloedow, DiSimone, Mark, Sanders
1994	Chris Potter	Concentric Circles	Concord	J. Hart, B. Stewart, Werner
1995	Rez Abbasi	Third Ear	Cathexis	Copland, Drewes, Erskine, Haddad, Johnson, Lossing, Mintzer, Perowsky, Takeishi, Werner
1995	David Binney	The Luxury of Guessing	AudioQuest	Armor, Caine, Hirshfield, McCaslin, Monder, Sadownick
1995	Bill Charlap	Souvenir	Criss Cross	Mackrel
1995	Julian Coryell	Jazzbo	Venus	Adams, L. Coryell, L. Harris, C. Jones, Moffett, Sanborn, Wolf
1995	Jim Hall	Dialogues	Telarc	Frisell, Goldstein, Lovano, Harrell, Stern, Watson
1995	T. S. Monk	The Charm	Blue Note	Mathews, Porcelli, Sickler, Williams
1995	Steve Slagle	Spread the Word	SteepleChase	Hagans, Hirshfield
1995	Stephen Sondheim	Color and Light	Sony	Barth, Blade, Blanchard, Bryson, Castro-Neves, Cole, A. Davis, T. Davis, Hall, Hancock, Hirshfield, Keezer, McBride, Mehldau, Piltch, Redman, Shorter, Smith, Thomas, Washington, N. Wilson
1995	Dave Stryker	Nomad	SteepleChase	Alexiev, Burridge, Brecker, Eckert, Fusco, Hanlon, Hirshfield, Kadleck, Millikan, J. Nelson, B. Parsons, Seaton, Sessions, Slagle, Warfield, J. Weiskopf, W. Weiskopf
1996	Julian Coryell	Without You	Venus	Brecker, L. Harris, Sadownick, Sanborn, Wolf
1996	Harold Danko	The Feeling of Jazz	SteepleChase	Hirshfield, Perry
1996	Harold Danko	New Autumn	SteepleChase	Hirshfield, Perry
1996	Dave Stryker	The Greeting	SteepleChase	Barth, Reedus, Sadownick
1997	Harold Danko	Tidal Breeze	SteepleChase	Hirshfield, Perry
1997	Jim Hall	Panorama: Live at the Village Vanguard	Telarc	Clarke
1997	Jim Hall	Textures	Telarc	Clarke, DiCenzo, Kisor, Lovano, Pugh, Roditi
1997	Pat Martino	All Sides Now	Blue Note	Amendola, Andress, Eubanks, Hedges, Hirshfield, C. Hunter, Nowinski, Paul, Perowsky, Satriani, Stern, Wilson
1997	Doug Raney	Back in New York	SteepleChase	Washington, Weiss
1997	Tim Ries	Imaginary Times	Moo	Amsallem, Baron, Brecker, C. Gordon, B. Hart, Monder, Wendholt
1997	Steve Slagle	Alto Blue	SteepleChase	Jackson, Kisor
1998	David Binney	Free to Dream	Mythology	Baum, Gayton, McCaslin, Adam Rogers, Sadownick, Edward Simon, Sipiagin, Wolleson, Yates
1998	Harold Danko	Stable Mates	SteepleChase	Hirshfield, Perry
1998	Jim Hall	By Arrangement	Telarc	Brofsky, Clarke, Harrell, Lovano, Metheny, New York Voices, Osby, Pugh, Rojas, Schulman
1998	Andy Parsons	Fundementia	IGMOD	Holober, Lewin, Monder
1998	Chris Potter	Vertigo	Concord	Drummond, Lovano, Rosenwinkel
1998	Tim Ries	Universal Spirits	Criss Cross	Drummond, Monder, Wendholt
1998	Seatbelts	Cowboy Bebop: Vitaminless	Victor	Bartz, Bernstein, Foster, Kanno, B. King, Payton, Potter, Previte, Redman, Robin, Roseman, Sadownick, Shapiro, Soskin, Vallet, Yamane
1998	Alex Sipiagin	Images	TCB	Binney, Goldstein, Hirshfield, Potter, Rogers, Roseman, Wollesen
1998	Dave Stryker	All the Way	SteepleChase	B. Stewart
1999	Lynne Arriale	Melody	TCB	Davis
1999	Domenico Ferrari	3	Straight Ahead	Arguelles, D. Mayer, J. Mayer
1999	David Kikoski	The Maze	Criss Cross	S. Blake, Watts
1999	Ben Perowsky	Ben Perowsky Trio	JazzKey Music	Speed
1999	Dave Pietro	Now Becoming Then	A-Records	Blade, Holober, Isler, McCann, McGuinness, Wendholt
1999	Renee Rosnes	Art & Soul	Blue Note	Bona, Drummond, Reeves
2000	Rebekka Bakken	Daily Mirror	Material	Blade, Cheek, Muthspiel
2000	Harold Danko	Nightscapes	SteepleChase	Hirshfield, Perry
2000	Joel Frahm	The Navigator	Palmetto	Berkman, Drummond
2000	Andrew Hill	Dusk	Palmetto	Drummond, Horton, Ehrlich, Tardy
2000	Jazzhole	Blackburst	Beave Music	Carter, Chancey, DiSimone, Eminizer, Inniss, M. Lewis, Mark, Pondell, Russ, Sadownick, Whitworth
2000	Rick Margitza	Heart of Hearts	Palmetto	Froman
2000	Donny McCaslin	Seen from Above	Arabesque	Black, Monder
2000	Greg Osby	The Invisible Hand	Blue Note	Carrington, Hall, Hill, Thomas
2000	Josh Roseman	Cherry	Enja	Baron, Bowie, Hoenig Jensen, Medeski, Monder, E. J. Rodriguez, J. Rodriguez, Shulman
2001	David Binney	Afinidad	Red	Blade, A. Cruz, L. Cruz, Rogers, Simon
2001	David Binney	South	ACT	Black, Blade, Caine, Potter, Rogers
2001	Stefano Bollani	Les Fleurs Bleues	Label Bleu	Penn
2001	Peter Epstein	Old School	M.A.	Epstein, Erskine
2001	Jim Hall	Jim Hall & Basses	Telarc	Haden, Holland, McBride, Mraz
2001	Rick Margitza	Memento	Palmetto	Blade, Miller
2001	Greg Osby	Symbols of Light	Blue Note	Browden, Howes, Insell-Staack, Moran, Rice-Shaw, Workman
2001	Dave Pietro	Standard Wonder	A-Records	Berkman, Blade, McCann, McGuinness, Wendholt
2001	Chris Potter	This Will Be	Storyville	Drummond, Fischer, Fuglsang, Hays, Potter, Tranberg
2001	Gratitude	Verve	Blade, Hays	
2001	Brad Shepik	Short Trip	Knitting Factory	Rainey
2001	Alex Sipiagin	Steppin' Zone	Criss Cross	Kikoski, Potter, Watts
2002	Jim Hall	Downbeat Critic's Choice	Telarc	Mraz
2002	Andrew Hill	A Beautiful Day	Palmetto	Ballou, D'avila, Ehrlich, Fahn, Fielder, Frink, C. Gordon, Horton, Parran, J. Savage, Staalens, A. Stewart, Tardy, Nasheet Waits
2002	Joachim Kühn	Universal Time	EmArcy	Hernandez, Portal, Potter
2002	Chris Potter	Traveling Mercies	Verve	Hays, Rogers, Scofield, B. Stewart
2002	Adam Rogers	Art of the Invisible	Criss Cross	Penn, Simon
2003	Andrew Hill	The Day the World Stood Still	Stunt	Agergaard, Fuglsang, Helm, Lohrer, Mockūnas, Svensson, Waits
2003	Mike Holober	Canyon	Sons of Sound	Blade, Muthspiel, Ries
2003	Kate McGarry	Show Me	Palmetto	Cardenas, Hammack, Hinrichs, Kovac, McHenry, Refosco, Snedeker, Wolleson
2003	Adam Rogers	Allegory	Criss Cross	Penn, Potter, Simon
2003	Brad Shepik	Drip	Knitting Factory	Rainey
2003	Luciana Souza	North and South	Sunnyside	Barth. Hersch, McCaslin, Penn, Simon
2003	Bojan Z	Transpacifik	Label Bleu	Waits
2004	David Binney	Welcome to Life	Mythology	Blade, Potter, Rogers, Taborn
2004	Jim Hall	Magic Meeting	ArtistShare	Nash
2004	Judy Niemack	Jazz Singer's Practice Session	GAM	Hersch, Weller
2004	Chris Potter	Lift: Live at the Village Vanguard	Sunnyside	Hays, B. Stewart
2004	Alex Sipiagin	Equilibrium	Criss Cross	Binney, Jackson, Kikoski, Potter
2005	Adam Rogers	Apparitions	Criss Cross	Penn, Potter, Rogers, Simon
2005	Alex Sipiagin	Returning	Criss Cross	S. Blake, Rogers, Sánchez
2006	Juliette Greco	Le Temps D'Une Chanson	Sunnyside	Abt, Albach, Brecker, Brice, Carbone, Casewell, Clark, Cutler, Fukuhara, Gallagher, Gemeinhardt, Goldstein, Henze, Jaffe, Jouannest, Kawahara, Kelley, Kitzis, Kuuskmann, Locker, Lovano, Lutzke, Mann, Miller, Mook, Moye, Nester, Nicolau, Paradise, Payne, Pridemore, Reid, Roney, Sadownick, Sato, Schultz, Shaw, Shumway, Siroky, Ting, Turner, Underwood, Wechsler, Witek
2006	Donny McCaslin	The Way Through	Arabesque	A. Cruz, Binney, Bostrom, Souza, Yates
2006	Donny McCaslin	Give and Go	Criss Cross	Cardenas, Jackson, Swana
2006	Donny McCaslin	Soar	Sunnyside	Bonilla, Endsley, Evans, Monder, A. Sánchez, Saturnino, Souza
2006	Kenny Werner	Democracy (Live at the Blue Note)	Half Note	Blade, D. Sánchez, Shulman, Werner, Wheeler
2007	David Binney	Oceanos	Criss Cross	Blade, Endsley, Ferber, Newman, Rogers, Saturnino, Simon, Souza
2007	Abbey Lincoln	Abbey Sings Abbey	Verve	Campbell, Eggar, Goldstein, Pelton
2007	Donny McCaslin	In Pursuit	Sunnyside	Binney, Monder, A. Sánchez, Saturnino
2007	Chris Potter	Song for Anyone	Sunnyside	Cardenas, A. Cruz, Eggar, M. Feldman, Martin, Potter, Rabinowitz, Tardy, von Kleist
2007	Adam Rogers	Time and the Infinite	Criss Cross	B. Stewart
2007	Antonio Sánchez	Migration	CAM Jazz	Corea, Metheny, Potter, D. Sánchez
2007	Alex Sipiagin	Prints	Criss Cross	Kikoski, Michiru, Potter, A. Sánchez
2007	Alex Sipiagin	Out of the Circle	ArtistShare	Eubanks, Goldstein, Hey, McCaslin, Michiru, Rogers, Sadownick, A. Sánchez
2007	Kenny Werner	Lawn Chair Society	Blue Note	Blade, Douglas, Pickett, Potter
2008	Jim Hall	Hemispheres	ArtistShare	Baron, Frisell
2008	Monday Michiru	My Ever Changing Moods	Geneon	Ephron, Hey, McCaslin, Rogers, Sadownick, A. Sánchez
2008	Jane Monheit	The Lovers, the Dreamers and Me	Concord	Bernstein, S. Blake, Goldstein, S. Harris, Johnson, Kanan, Lubambo, Miner, Montalbano, A. Sánchez, Vignola
2008	Boz Scaggs	Speak Low	Decca	Acuña, Crystal, L. Feldman, Goldstein, Hammann, Heick, Locker, Mainieri, Marini, Martin, Robbins, Seaton, Shanahan, Sheppard
2009	Helio Alves	It's Clear	Reservoir	Lubambo, Simpson
2009	David Binney	Third Occasion	Mythology	Akinmusire, Binney, Blade, A. Hunter, C. King, Mason
2009	Bendik Hofseth	XI	Grappa	Goldstein, Louvel, Mainieri, A. Sánchez
2009	Komeda Project	Requiem	WM	Johnson, Medyna, Waits, Winnicki
2009	Donny McCaslin	Declaration	Sunnyside	Gilkes, Greenblatt, Komer, McCaslin, Monder, Rojas, Saturnino, A. Sánchez, Sipiagin, Simon
2009	Rale Mićić	3	CTA	Hutchinson, Jovanovic, Markovic
2009	Tineke Postma	The Traveller	Etcetera	Allen, Carrington
2010	Mason Brothers Quintet	Two Sides One Story	Archival	Kikoski, Potter, A. Sánchez
2010	Michel Portal	Baïlador	Classics & Jazz France	Akinmusire, DeJohnette, Loueke
2010	Antonio Sánchez	Live in New York at Jazz Standard	CAM Jazz	Sánchez, Zenón
2011	Gary Burton	Common Ground	Mack Avenue	Lage, A. Sánchez
2011	Maurane	Fais-Moi Une Fleur	Polydor	Campbell, Creswell, Eggar, Goldstein, Henze, Lee, Mainieri, J. Nelson, Nester, Pelton, Phaneuf, Pillow, Rizner, Sanborn, Thielemans, Todorov
2011	John Scofield	A Moment's Peace	EmArcy	Blade, Goldings
2012	Thomas Chapin	Never Let Me Go: Quartets '95 & '96	Playscape	Fujiwara, Nicholson, Wilson
2012	Enrico Pieranunzi	Permutation	CAM Jazz	A. Sánchez
2012	Edward Simon	A Master's Diary	CAM Jazz	Penn
2013	David Ake	Bridges	Posi-Tone	Alessi, Coltrane, Epstein, Ferber
2013	Gary Burton	Guided Tour	Mack Avenue	Lage, A. Sánchez
2013	Alex Sipiagin	Overlooking Moments	Criss Cross	Harland, Potter
2014	Thana Alexa	Ode to Heroes	Jazz Village	Boente, Disu, Krečič, Lindhorst, McCaslin, Rafalides, Roeder, Salvatore, A. Sánchez, Yasutake
2014	Sylvie Courvoisier	Birdies for Lulu	Intakt	M. Feldman, Mintz
2014	Jazzhole	Blue 72	Beave Music	Binney, Friedman, Inniss, Mark, Pondel, Pozner, Robohm, Sadownick, Slattery
2014	Enrico Pieranunzi	Stories	CAM Jazz	A. Sánchez
2015	Chris Potter	Imaginary Cities	ECM	Ephron, J. Feldman, Hammann, Martin, S. Nelson, Rogers, Smith, Taborn
2015	Various	Hommage a Eberhard Weber	ECM	Burton, Garbarek, McCandless, Metheny, Gottlieb, SWR Big Band
2016	Nels Cline	Currents, Constellations	Blue Note	Lage, Rainey
2016	Julian Lage	Arclight	Mack Avenue	Wollesen
2016	Enrico Pieranunzi	New Spring	CAM Jazz	McCaslin, Penn
2017	Joey Alexander	Joey.Monk.Live!	Motéma	Jones
2017	Sinne Eeg	Dreams	Stunt	Baron, Christoffersen, Koonse, Mandrup, J. Nilsson, L. Nilsson
2017	Donny McCaslin	Brooklyn 3	Edition Longplay	J. Blake, Douglas
2017	Bria Skonberg	With a Twist	Okeh	Cardenas, Fortner, Goldberg, Goldstein, Johnson, Wilson
2018	Julian Lage	Modern Lore	Mack Avenue	Chester, J. Harris, Wolleson
2018	Joshua Redman	Still Dreaming	Nonesuch	Blade, Miles
2018	Edward Simon	Sorrows & Triumphs	Sunnyside	Binney, Blade, Bocatto, Parlato, Quintero, Rogers
2018	Steve Slagle	Dedication	Panorama	Diaz, Fields, B. Stewart, Stryker
2018	Luciana Souza	The Book of Longing	Sunnyside	Pinheiro
2019	Franco Ambrosetti	Long Waves	Unit	Caine, DeJohnette, Scofield
2019	Joshua Redman	Sun on Sand	Nonesuch	Brooklyn Rider, Takeishi, Zimmerli
2020	Benjamin Koppel	Ultimate Soul & Jazz Revue	Cowbell Music	Anderson, Brecker, Christoffersen, Heller, M. C. Koppel, Nimmer, Purdie
2022	Franco Ambrosetti	Nora	Enja	Caine, Caswell, Erskine, Scofield
2023	John Bailey	Time Bandits	Freedom Road Records	Cables, V. Lewis
2024	Wolfgang Muthspiel	Dance of the Elders	ECM	Blade
2026	Steven Bernstein	ResoNation Trio / Ultra Resonance	Royal Potato Family	Waits
