= Bolero Project =

Latin jazz recording project

Bolero Project is an ArtistShare recording project led by Venezuelan singer and percussionist Leonardo Granados and jazz pianist Edward Simon.

== ArtistShare Project – Bolero Project ==
ArtistShare has been well known for their "fan funded" projects which expose the creative process of music making to fans. "Bolero Project" is an appreciation of boleros, a sensual dance music widespread in South America. The project is dedicated to Simon's father who introduced the music to him and Granados' mother as a special gift. All the boleros are interpreted into jazz/improvisation style with Simon providing arrangements and Granados providing vocal interpretations. Along with recorded music, there are exclusive materials such as lyrics to sing along, a short lecture on the history of boleros provided by the artists, video/audio updates, photos, downloads, etc.

There are different participation levels which fans can select from. As the level gets higher, fans can get involved in the project more. Any higher participation level from Bronze, participants can receive credit listing on a personalized and autographed CD. Silver level provides Bronze level contents, a pre-loaded iPod with the artists' favorite music and a VIP ticket to their concert. Gold level offers Bronze level content, a pre-loaded iPod with artists' favorite music, free access to any of Granados' performances for one year, a personal thank you letter from the artists. Executive Producer level offers Gold level contents, and an exclusive studio recording dedicated for the participant.

The CD was scheduled to be released in July 2009.

== Band members ==
Leonardo Granados
A Venezuelan singer and percussionist based in New York City. He was born into a music-oriented family in San Cristóbal, Venezuela. He has studied at the Pedro Antonio Ríos Reina School of Music, founded by his father. He has worked with artists such as flutist Marco Granados, Paquito D'Rivera, Simón Díaz, Edward Simon, Raul Jaurena, Tito Castro, Katie Viqueira, Pablo Ziegler, etc.

His voice has been recognized by various bands and theaters. He has been featured in Marco Granados' Un Mundo Ensemble and David Oquendo's Latin Jazz. He also has been one of lead singers for the 2004 ACE Award Winner off-off Broadway production "Tiempo de Tango". As a tango singer, he has performed in Ástor Piazzolla's María de Buenos Aires and Lincoln Center Institute's Camerata Latina.

Edward Simon
A Venezuelan jazz pianist who is well received by critics. Simon has performed with numerous jazz masters such as Herbie Mann, Paquito D'Rivera, Bobby Hutcherson, Bobby Watson, Terence Blanchard, Don Byron, etc. Performing with Paquito D'Rivera influenced him to integrate his native music into his style. He has recorded nine albums as a leader. He has involved in more than 40 albums. His work has been recognized by various organizations such as Chamber Music America and the New York Foundation for the Arts.

The New York Times describes, "Mr. Simon's touch, light and warm, allows for his music to drift calmly, taking its time to get to where it has to go."

Scott Colley
A jazz bassist known for both his technical abilities as well as his feel for challenging pieces, Scott Colley played with jazz legends such as Jim Hall, Andrew Hill and Herbie Hancock. His empathetic skills, strong melodic penchant and improvisational prowess have also served him well, appearing in various projects with Chris Potter, Greg Osby, David Binney and Adam Rogers.

Adam Cruz
A New York City native gifted drummer in both jazz and Latin styles. His musicality, versatility and technical skill have brought him wide recognition. Cruz has been featured on nearly 40 recordings. He has recorded and toured with The Mingus Big Band, David Sánchez Quintet, Leon Parker Band, Chick Corea's Origin Sextet, Danilo Perez, and has also performed with such artists as Mongo Santamaría, Airto Moreira, Herbie Mann and McCoy Tyner.

== Guest artists ==
- Paquito D'Rivera (sax)
- Marco Granados (flute)
- Pernell Saturnino (percussion)
- Diego Urcola (trumpet)
