= Tim Armacost =

American saxophonist and composer

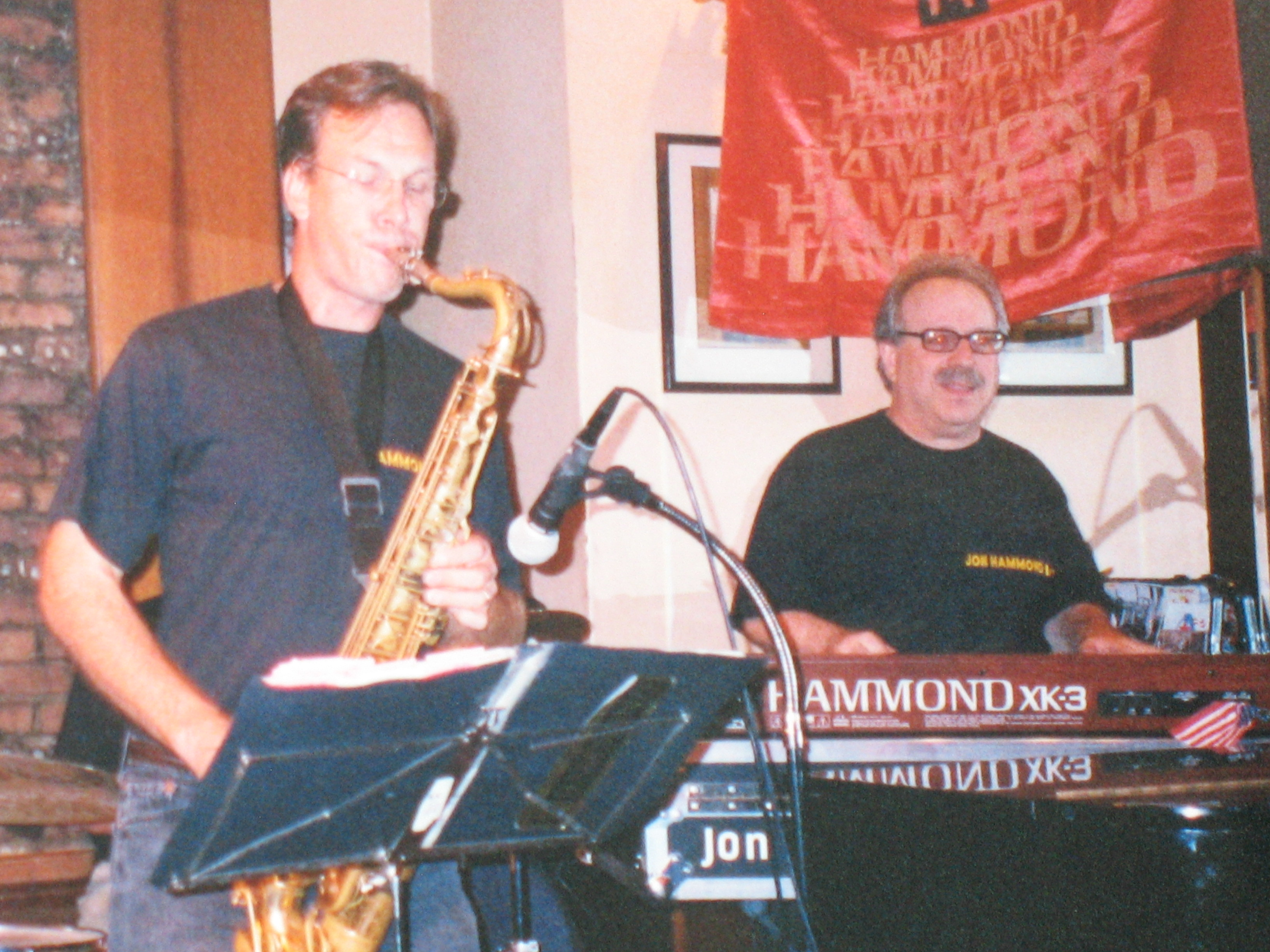
Tim Armacost (left) with Jon Hammond in 2008

Tim Armacost (born December 8, 1962) is an American jazz musician.

== Life and career ==
Armacost grew up in Tokyo and Washington D.C. At the age of 8 he first learned the clarinet before switching to the tenor saxophone at the age of 16 and playing in big bands in D.C. At 18 he moved to Los Angeles, where he performed with Bobby Bradford and Charlie Shoemake. After graduating (magna cum laude) from Pomona College, he moved to Amsterdam and worked from there for seven years in Europe, where he also taught at the Amsterdam Conservatory, and from 1986 was involved in recordings, including with Rob van den Broeck, Klaus Ignatzek, Rick Hollander, Walter Lang and Hendrik Meurkens (Sambahia, Concord 1990). He lived in New Delhi, India for a year, where he studied tabla with Vijay Ateet, incorporating Indian classical music concepts into his original writing. He returned to India twice, performing with American and Indian jazz musicians at the Bombay International Jazz Festival, at the Jazz Yatra Festival in New Delhi, and in concerts in Hyderabad, Bangalore, and Calcutta.

In 1993, Armacost moved to New York and recorded his debut album, Fire (Concord Jazz), with Kenny Barron, Gerald Cannon, Billy Hart, and Shingo Okudaira, followed by a live recording (Live at Smalls) with guest soloist Tom Harrell. He also recorded the album Ugetsu (with Peter Tuscher, Adrian Mears, Bernhard Pichl, Martin Zenker, and Dejan Terzic), along with several others. During this time he also worked with Kenny Barron, Roy Hargrove, the David Murray Big Band, Maria Schneider Orchestra, Randy Brecker, Al Foster, Jimmy Cobb, Victor Lewis, Peter Erskine, Don Friedman, and Joris Teepe. In the 2010s he was also a member of the New York Standards Quartet and co-leader of the Brooklyn Big Band, for which he composes and arranges. He recorded an album with Mike Rodriguez and Yutaka Shiina titled Future Swing (2015). In 2018 he contributed to David Berkman's album Six of One. He was involved in 55 jazz recording sessions between 1986 and 2019.

Armacost composed for Wynton Marsalis and the Jazz at Lincoln Center Orchestra. He has also taught with Jamey Aebersold at his Summer Jazz Workshops, and at the Stanford Summer Jazz Workshops, at Queens College in New York City and as a guest lecturer at universities in the U.S., Japan, and Europe.

Armacost is the author of The Jazz Saxophone Book, published by Sher Music, Inc.

== Discography ==
- Fire (Concord), with Kenny Barron, Gerald Cannon, Billy Hart, and Shingo Okudaira
- Live at Smalls (Double-Time Records, 1998), with Tom Harrell, Jonny King, Gerald Cannon, and Shingo Okudaira
- The Wishing Well (Double-Time Records, 2000), with Bruce Barth, Ray Drummond, and Billy Hart
- Brightly Dark (Satchmo Jazz Records, 2001), with Bruce Barth, Ray Drummond, and Billy Hart
- Craig Bailey, Tim Armacost & Brooklyn Big Band: Live at Sweet Rhythm (Candid Productions Ltd., 2009)
- New York Standards Quartet: Unstandard (Challenge, 2010), with David Berkman, Yosuke Inoue, and Gene Jackson
- New York Standards Quartet: The New Straight Ahead (Whirlwind, 2013), with David Berkman, Daiki Yasukagawa, and Gene Jackson
- New York Standards Quartet: Power of 10 (Whirlwind, 2014), with David Berkman, Michael Janisch, and Gene Jackson
- New York Standards Quartet: Sleight of Hand (Whirlwind, 2016), with David Berkman, Daiki Yasukagawa, and Gene Jackson
- Time Being (Whirlwind, 2016), with David Kikoski, Robert Hurst, and Jeff Tain Watts
- New York Standards Quartet: Heaven Steps to Seven (2018), with David Berkman, Ugonna Okegwo, and Gene Jackson
- The Inevitable Note (TMA Records, 2023), with Joe Locke, Jim Ridl, Kenny Davis and Rudy Royston
