= Edward Simon (musician) =

Venezuelan jazz pianist and composer (born 1969)

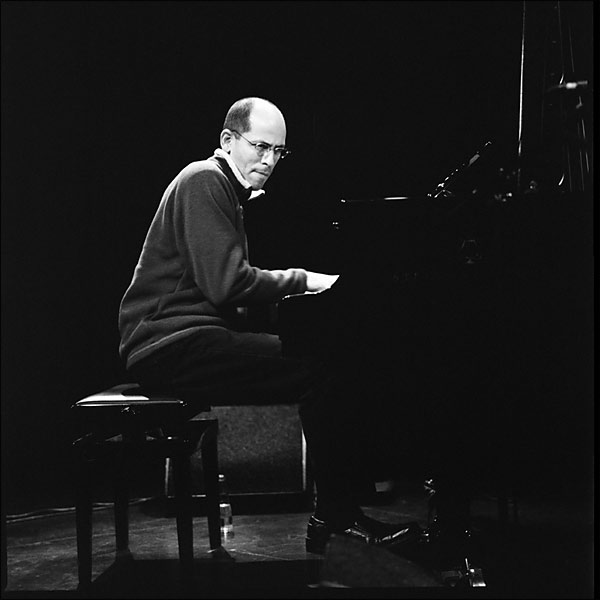
- Simon at the LantarenVenster, Rotterdam, 2007

Background information
- Born: July 27, 1969 (age 56); Punta Cardón, Venezuela
- Genres: Jazz; Latin jazz; world fusion; classical
- Occupations: Musician; composer
- Instrument: Piano
- Years active: 1988–present
- Labels: AudioQuest; Kokopelli; Mythology; Red; Criss Cross; CAM Jazz; Audio & Video Labs; Sunnyside; Ridgeway
- Formerly of: SFJAZZ Collective
- Website: www.edwardsimon.com

Edward Simon (born July 27, 1969) is a Venezuelan jazz pianist and composer.

== Early life ==
Simon was born in Punta Cardón, Venezuela. At the age of ten, he moved to the United States to study at the Philadelphia Performing Arts School. After graduating, he attended the University of the Arts in Philadelphia, where he studied classical piano, and then the Manhattan School of Music, where he studied jazz piano.

== Later life and career ==
In 1988, he recorded as a sideman with Greg Osby, then worked as a member of the band Horizon led by Bobby Watson. For the next eight years, he was a member of Terence Blanchard's band. He has also worked with Herbie Mann, Paquito D'Rivera, Bobby Hutcherson, Jerry González, John Patitucci, Arturo Sandoval, Manny Oquendo, and Don Byron. Simon recorded Beauty Within (AudioQuest, 1994), his first album as a bandleader, with bass guitarist Anthony Jackson and drummer Horacio Hernández. During the same year, he was a finalist in the Thelonious Monk International Jazz Piano Competition (now the Herbie Hancock Institute of Jazz). Then, the following year, he composed Rumba Neurotica for the Relâche ensemble.

He formed Ensemble Venezuela in 2003 to combine jazz with the music of Venezuela. He was commissioned by Chamber Music America to write Venezuelan Suite, for which he recorded an album in 2012, with musicians from Venezuela, Colombia, and the U.S.

Simon has played on several Grammy-nominated jazz albums. Besides his trio, he leads the Sexteto Venezuela, the Afinidad Quartet, and the group Simon, Simon, & Simon with his brothers. He has taught at the New School for Jazz and Contemporary Music in New York City and has been artist in residence at Western Michigan University.

== Discography ==
=== As leader ===
Release year	Album	Label	Session musicians
1994	Beauty Within	AudioQuest	Horacio Hernández, Anthony Jackson, Diego Urcola
1995	Edward Simon	Kokopelli	Larry Grenadier, Adam Cruz, Mark Turner, Milton Cardona
1998	La Bikina	Mythology	Adam Cruz, Ben Street, Mark Turner, David Binney, Pernell Saturnino, Diego Urcola, Milton Cardona
2001	Afinidad	Red	David Binney, Scott Colley, Brian Blade, Adam Cruz, Lucía Pulido, Adam Rogers
2003	The Process	Criss Cross	John Patitucci, Eric Harland
2005	Fiestas de Agosto	Red	David Binney, Donny McCaslin
2005	Simplicitas	Criss Cross	Avishai Cohen, Adam Cruz, Luciana Souza, Adam Rogers, Pernell Saturnino
2006	Unicity	CAM Jazz	John Patitucci, Brian Blade
2007	Océanos	Criss Cross	David Binney, Scott Colley, Brian Blade, Luciana Souza, Adam Rogers, Shane Endsley, Jesse Newman, Alan Ferber, Pernell Saturnino
2009	Poesia	CAM Jazz	John Patitucci, Brian Blade
2010	Danny Boy	Audio & Video Labs	Philip Donkin, Stephen Keogh
2013	Live in New York at Jazz Standard	Sunnyside	John Patitucci, Brian Blade
2014	Venezuelan Suite	Sunnyside	—
2016	Latin American Songbook	Sunnyside	—
2018	Sorrows & Triumphs	Sunnyside	David Binney, Scott Colley, Brian Blade, Adam Rogers
2021	Solo Live	Ridgeway	—

=== As sideman ===
With Craig Handy

- Split Second Timing (Arabesque, 1992) – recorded in 1991

With Greg Osby

- Mindgames (JMT, 1988)
- Season of Renewal (JMT, 1990) – recorded in 1989

With Terence Blanchard

- 1994: Romantic Defiance (Columbia, 1995)
- 1995: The Heart Speaks (Columbia, 1996)
- 1999: Wandering Moon (Sony Classical, 2000)
- 2001: Let's Get Lost (Sony Classical, 2001)
