= Peter Epstein =

American jazz saxophonist

- Born: Peter Coleman Epstein; January 18, 1967 (age 59); Eugene, Oregon, U.S.
- Genres: Avant-garde jazz, free jazz
- Occupations: Musician, professor
- Instrument: Alto saxophone
- Years active: 1982–present
- Labels: M.A. Recordings, Songlines, Origin
- Website: peterepsteinmusic.com

Peter Coleman Epstein (born January 18, 1967) is an American jazz saxophonist.

== Biography ==
Epstein learned clarinet as a youth from his father, Ed Epstein, who played saxophone, but picked up his father's instrument in his teens, playing in high school ensembles. While attending the California Institute of the Arts, Epstein studied improvisation and composition with bassist Charlie Haden, flautist James Newton, and clarinetist John Carter, concurrently exploring West African music and dance, North and South Indian classical music and Balkan folk music.

He graduated from the California Institute of the Arts with a degree in music in 1992, then moved to Brooklyn, New York and has since appeared on more than 50 recordings and toured with Ralph Alessi, Michael Cain, Scott Colley, Jerry Granelli, Carola Grey, Bobby Previte, Brad Shepik, and Marcelo Zarvos.

Epstein was a founding member of the School for Improvisational Music in New York City and has taught workshops at universities, conservatories, and festivals around the United States (Eastman School of Music, California Institute of the Arts, New England Conservatory of Music) and the world (Nepal, India, Slovenia, Poland, Sweden, Germany, Portugal, Colombia).

He received his Master of Music Degree in Saxophone Performance from the University of Nevada, Reno in 2004. In 2007 Epstein became the director of Jazz & Improvisational Music and Associate Professor of Jazz Saxophone at University of Nevada, Reno.

== Discography ==
=== As Leader ===
- Staring at the Sun (MA, 1997)
- Solus (solo) (MA, 1998)
- The Invisible (MA, 1999)
- Lingua Franca (with Brad Shepik and Brad Kilmer) (Songlines, 2005)
- Old School (MA, 2001)
- The Gadfly (as Bug)
- The Dark (with Larry Engstrom and David Ake) (Origin, 2010)
- Abstract Realism (Origin, 2010)
- Epstein Alliance (with brother, Ed) (Berno Records 2010)
- Polarities (with Ralph Alessi) (Songlines, 2014)
- Two Legs Bad (Shifting Paradigm Records, 2023)

=== As The Collective ===
- Boats (The Collective, 2003)
- Balance (The Collective, 2006)
- Once and Again (The Collective, 2008)

=== With David Ake ===
Bridges (Positone, 2013) Lake Effect (Positone, 2015)

=== With Ralph Alessi and Modular Theatre ===
- Hissy Fit (Love Slave, 1999)
- Open Season (RKM Music, 2008)

=== With Michael Cain ===
- Circa (ECM, 1997)
- Phfew (MA, 1998)

=== With James Carney Group ===
- Offset Rhapsody (Jacaranda Records, 1997)
- Green-Wood (Songlines, 2007)
- Ways and Means (Songlines, 2009)

=== With Jerry Granelli ===
- Enter, A Dragon (Songlines, 1998)
- Crowd Theory (Songlines, 1999)

=== With Carola Grey ===
- Noisy Mama (Jazzline, 1992)
- The Age of Illusions (Jazzline, 1994)

=== With Pete McCann ===
- Parable (Palmetto Records, 1998)
- You Remind Me of Someone (Palmetto Records, 2000)

=== With João Paulo Esteves da Silva ===
- O Exílio (OA2, 2003)
- Almas (MA, 1999)
- Esquina (MA, 2000)
- Nascer (MA, 2001)

=== With Brad Shepik ===
- The Loan (Songlines, 1998)
- The Well (Songlines, 2000)
- Lingua Franca (Songlines, 2005)

=== With Marcelo Zarvos ===
- Dualism (MA, 1995)
- Labyrinths (MA, 1997)
- Music Journal (MA, 2000)

=== As Sideman ===
- Chris Dahlgren, Best Intentions (Koch Jazz, 2000)
- Nu Shooz, Kung Pao Kitchen (Nu Shooz, 2012)
- Chris Parker, Late in Lisbon (MA, 1999)
- Miroslav Tadic, Without Words (MA, 1992)
- David Tronzo, Crunch (Love Slave, 1999)
