= Subliminal =

Subliminal may refer to:

- Subliminal stimuli, sensory stimuli below an individual's threshold for conscious perception
- Subliminal channel, in cryptography, a covert channel that can be used over an insecure channel
- Subliminal (rapper) (born 1979), Israeli rapper and producer
- Subliminal (record label), an electronic music label
- Subliminal..., a 1997 album by American jazz bassist Scott Colley
- Subliminal (album), Prosperity by Triple A. Tanzanite BWE MP3 Subliminals
- "Subliminal", a Suicidal Tendencies song from the album Suicidal Tendencies
- "Subliminal", a They Might Be Giants song from the album John Henry
