= David Berkman =

American jazz musician

David Berkman (born December 28, 1958) is an American jazz pianist, composer, arranger and educator.

== Background ==
Berkman grew up in Cleveland, Ohio, playing in house bands for visiting jazz musicians Sonny Stitt, Hank Crawford, and Carter Jefferson and established musicians living in New York but hailing from Cleveland Joe Lovano, Jamey Haddad, and Greg Bandy. He moved to New York City in 1985.

As a composer, Berkman was awarded the 2000 Doris Duke/Chamber Music America New Works Creation and Presentation Grant. He is a recording artist whose recordings (six with Palmetto Records including his 2019 "Six of One", one each on Challenge Records, Smalls Live Records, Red Piano Records and his 2020 release on Without Records--"David Berkman plays music of John Coltrane and Pete Seeger") have appeared on numerous best records of the year critics' lists: The New York Times (Top 10 Records of 1998), the Village Voice (Top 10 Records of 1998), Down Beat (Best records of the 90s), JazzIz (Top 5 records of 1998), Jazz Times and others. Critic John Stevenson wrote in his 2000 review of Berkman's Leaving Home, "With Leaving Home, (Berkman) has ascended to a new height of creativity. Tracing the trajectory of mapped out by his earlier CD's we can see a greater level of melodic sophistication and more intense coalescing of compositional elements." As a jazz clinician, Berkman was awarded the Homer Osborne Award from the Wichita Jazz Society and has performed and taught at numerous jazz camps, universities and conservatories around the United States, South America and Europe.

Berkman published three books with Sher Music Publishing: The Jazz Musician's Guide to Creative Practicing (2007), The Jazz Singer's Guidebook (2009) and The Jazz Harmony Book (2014). He has played in many bands including, most importantly, says Scott Yanow of the All Music Guide to Jazz those of Cecil McBee, whose 1997 album Unspoken includes Berkman. Berkman has performed with Tom Harrell and the Vanguard Orchestra and has performed with, recorded or arranged for numerous jazz musicians, including Sonny Stitt, Brian Blade, Joe Lovano, Dave Douglas, Ray Drummond, Billy Hart, Dick Oatts, Tony Malaby, Chris Potter, Scott Wendholt, Lenny White, Scott Colley, Craig Handy, Steven Bernstein, Bill Stewart, Dave Stryker, David "Fathead" Newman, Hank Crawford, and Jane Monheit )

Now appearing more often as a bandleader, Berkman has performed solo and with his quartet, quintet and sextet at festivals and clubs in the United States, Europe and Japan, most recently at the North Sea Jazz Festival, the Edinburgh Festival, the Glasgow Jazz Festival, the Belfast Festival and the Cork Festival. Recent tours include clubs and concert performances in Germany, Switzerland, Ireland, the United Kingdom, the Netherlands, Austria, Belgium, São Paulo, Japan and around the United States. Recent projects include piano/trumpet duo performances with Dave Douglas, at the 2006 Jazz Composers Symposium in Tampa, Florida, and the 2005 International Trumpet Guild Convention in Bangkok, and with Tom Harrell in Italy, as well as the cooperatively-led New York Standards Quartet (with Tim Armacost, Daiki Yasukagawa and Gene Jackson). NYSQ has 7 recordings out, the last three on London based Whirlwind Recordings and recently completed their 14th annual Japanese tour. Old Friends and New Friends on Palmetto Records was released May 5, 2015 and features Brian Blade on drums, Linda May Han Oh on bass, and Dayna Stephens, Adam Kolker, and Billy Drewes on saxophones. Berkman's latest, Six of One, was released on Palmetto Records April 5, 2019, and features Dayna Stephens, Adam Kolker, Billy Drewes and Tim Armacost on saxophones, clarinets and EWI, Chris Lightcap on bass and Kenneth Salters on drums.

Berkman is a tenured professor at Queens College in New York City and is a visiting professor at the Prince Claus Conservatoire in Groningen, the Netherlands.

== See also ==
- List of jazz arrangers
- List of jazz pianists
