= Criss Cross Jazz =

Dutch jazz record label

- Founded: 1981
- Founder: Gerry Teekens
- Genre: Jazz
- Country of origin: Netherlands
- Location: Enschede
- Official website: www.crisscrossjazz.com

Criss Cross Jazz is a Dutch record company and label specializing in jazz.

Criss Cross was established in 1981 in Enschede, Netherlands by Gerry Teekens, a professional drummer and linguistics professor. Teekens founded the label after organizing tours for jazz musicians such as Jimmy Raney and Warne Marsh. Early issues included Raney and Marsh, Chet Baker, Pete Christlieb, Stan Getz, Tom Harrell, and Clifford Jordan. Criss Cross issued its first compact disc in 1987 in response to international demand. Teekens retired from his position as a professor to work full time on Criss Cross in 1991. The label has released over 400 albums.

Teekens focused on giving talented but underrecorded jazz musicians "considerable artistic freedom", and was also known for introducing musicians as band leaders for the first time, such as Mark Turner, Seamus Blake, and Peter Bernstein.

Gerry Teekens died on October 31, 2019, at the age of 84. Criss Cross was taken over by his son, Jerry Teekens Jr., who has since released new music on the label. Teekens Jr.'s daughters also help manage the label.

== Discography ==
Catalog No. (CRISS)	Artist	Album	Details
1001	Jimmy Raney Quartet	Raney '81	featuring Doug Raney
1002	Warne Marsh	Star Highs	with Hank Jones, George Mraz and Mel Lewis
1003	Kirk Lightsey Trio	Isotope	
1005	Johnny Coles Quartet	New Morning	
1006	Doug Raney Sextet	Meeting the Tenors	
1007	Warne Marsh Quartet	A Ballad Album	featuring Lou Levy
1008	Kenny Barron Trio	Green Chimneys	with Buster Williams and Ben Riley
1009	Jimmy Raney Quartet	The Master	featuring Kirk Lightsey
1010	Chet Baker Quintet	Blues for a Reason	featuring Warne Marsh
1011	Clifford Jordan Quintet	Two Tenor Winner	featuring Junior Cook
1012	Hod O'Brien Quintet	Opalessence	featuring Tom Harrell and Pepper Adams
1013	Joe Van Enkhuizen Quartet	Back on the Scene	
1014	Kenny Garrett Quintet	Introducing Kenny Garrett	featuring Woody Shaw
1015	Slide Hampton Quintet	Roots	featuring Clifford Jordan
1016	Chet Baker Trio	Chet's Choice	featuring Philip Catherine
1017	Cedar Walton Quartet	Bluesville Time	with Dale Barlow, David Williams & Billy Higgins
1018	Tom Harrell Quintet	Moon Alley	featuring Kenny Garrett and Kenny Barron
1019	Jimmy Raney Trio	Wisteria	with Tommy Flanagan and George Mraz
1020	Ted Brown Quintet	In Good Company	
1021	Dave Pike	Pike's Groove	with The Cedar Walton Trio
1022	Michael Weiss Quintet	Presenting Michael Weiss	
1023	Warne Marsh Quartet & Quintet	Back Home	
1024	Jimmy Knepper Quintet	Dream Dancing	
1025	Clifford Jordan Quartet	Royal Ballads	
1026	Peter Leitch Trio	On a Misty Night	featuring Neil Swainson and Mickey Roker
1027	Chet Baker Quartet	Live at Nick's	featuring Phil Markowitz - recorded in 1978
1028	Ralph Moore Quartet	623 C Street	
1029	Brian Lynch Sextet	Peer Pressure	
1030	Kirk Lightsey Quintet	Kirk 'n Marcus	featuring Marcus Belgrave
1031	Ted Brown Trio	Free Spirit	with Hod O'Brien and Jacques Schols - recorded in 1987
1032	Jim Snidero Quintet	Mixed Bag	
1033	Mike LeDonne Quintet	'Bout Time	
1034	Steve Nelson	Communications	with Mulgrew Miller, Ray Drummond & Tony Reedus
1035	Ralph Moore Quintet	Rejuvenate!	
1036	Benny Green Quintet	Prelude	
1037	Greg Marvin Quintet	Workout!	
1038	Benny Green Trio	In This Direction	featuring Buster Williams & Lewis Nash
1039	Peter Leitchn Quintet/Sextet	Portraits and Dedications	featuring Bobby Watson
1040	Ray Drummond Quintet	Camera in a Bag	featuring Steve Nelson and David "Fathead" Newman
1041	Mike LeDonne Quintet/Trio	The Feeling of Jazz	
1042	Brian Lynch Quintet	Back Room Blues	
1043	Pete Christlieb Quartet	Conversations with Warne Volume 1	featuring Warne Marsh - recorded in 1978
1044	Kenny Barron Quartet	Invitation	
1045	John Swana Quintet	Introducing John Swana	
1046	Ralph Lalama & His Manhattan All Stars	Feelin' and Dealin'	
1047	Tad Shull Quintet	Deep Passion	
1048	Philip Catherine Trio	I Remember You	featuring Tom Harrell and Hein Van de Geyn
1049	Gary Smulyan Quintet	The Lure of Beauty	
1050	Kirk Lightsey Trio	From Kirk to Nat	
1051	Don Braden Quintet	The Time Is Now	
1052	Tomas Franck Quartet	Tomas Franck in New York	
1053	Javon Jackson Quartet	Me and Mr. Jones	1992
1054	Harold Ashby Quartet	What Am I Here For?	with Mulgrew Miller, Rufus Reid and Ben Riley - recorded in 1990
1055	John Swana	John Swana and Friends	
1056	Sam Newsome Quintet	Sam I Am	
1057	Billy Drummond Quintet	Native Colours	featuring Steve Nelson, Steve Wilson, Renee Rosnes, Ray Drummond
1058	Mike LeDonne Trio	Common Ground	with Dennis Irwin and Kenny Washington
1059	Melvin Rhyne Trio	The Legend	
1060	Philip Catherine Trio	Moods Volume I	featuring Tom Harrell and Hein Van de Geyn
1061	Philip Catherine Trio	Moods Volume II	featuring Tom Harrell and Hein Van de Geyn
1062	Steve Wilson Quintet	New York Summit	
1063	Ralph Lalama Quartet	Momentum	
1064	Tom Williams Quintet	Introducing Tom Williams	
1065	Jimmy Raney Trio	But Beautiful	featuring George Mraz and Lewis Nash
1066	Ralph Bowen Quintet	Movin' On	
1067	Chris Potter	Presenting Chris Potter	
1068	Gary Smulyan Quartet	Homage	featuring Tommy Flanagan
1069	Don Braden Sextet	Wish List	
1070	Brian Lynch Quintet/Sextet	Brian Lynch at the Main Event	featuring Melvin Rhyne
1071	Tad Shull Quartet	In the Land of the Tenor	
1072	Jim Snidero Quintet	Blue Afternoon	
1073	Steve Wilson Quintet	Blues for Marcus	
1074	Mike LeDonne Sextet	Soulmates	
1075	Walt Weiskopf Sextet	Simplicity	
1076	Dan Faulk Quartet	Focusing In	
1077	Eric Alexander Quintet	New York Calling	
1078	Scott Wendholt Quintet	The Scheme of Things	
1079	Peter Bernstein Quartet	Somethin's Burnin'	
1080	Melvin Rhyne Quartet	Boss Organ	
1081	Don Braden Septet	After Dark	
1082	Cedar Walton Trio	Manhattan Afternoon	
1083	Billy Drummond Quartet	The Gift	featuring Seamus Blake, Renee Rosnes, Peter Washington
1084	Greg Gisbert Quintet	Harcology	
1085	Grant Stewart Quintet	Downtown Sounds	
1086	Rob Bargad Sextet	Better Times	
1087	Darrell Grant Quartet	Black Art	
1088	Seamus Blake Quintet	The Call	
1089	The Tenor Triangle with the Melvin Rhyne Trio	Tell It Like It Is	
1090	John Swana Quintet	The Feeling's Mutual	
1091	Tom Williams Quintet	Straight Street	
1092	Gary Smulyan Nonet	Saxophone Mosaic	
1093	Jonny King Quintet	In from the Cold	
1094	Mark Turner Quintet	Yam Yam	
1095	Peter Bernstein Quartet	Signs of Life	
1096	Steve Wilson Quintet	Step Lively	
1097	Ralph Lalama Quartet	You Know What I Mean	
1098	Eric Alexander Sextet	Full Range	
1099	Jon Gordon Quintet	Ask Me Now	
1100	Walt Weiskopf Quartet	A World Away	
1101	Scott Wendholt Quintet	Through the Shadows	
1102	Tim Warfield Quintet	A Cool Blue	
1103	Pete Christlieb Quartet	Conversations with Warne Volume 2	featuring Warne Marsh - recorded in 1978
1104	Joe Magnarelli Quintet	Why Not	featuring Eric Alexander, Renee Rosnes, Peter Washington, Kenny Washington, Daniel Sadownick
1105	Richard Wyands Trio	Reunited	
1106	Darrell Grant Quintet	The New Bop	
1107	Chris Potter Quartet	Sundiata	
1108	Bill Charlap Trio	Souvenir	
1109	Bobby Broom Quartet	No Hype Blues	
1110	Seamus Blake Quintet	The Bloomdaddies	
1111	Mike LeDonne Quintet	Waltz for an Urbanite	
1112	Jim Snidero Quintet	Vertigo	
1113	Steve Davis Quintet	The Jaunt	
1114	Eric Alexander Quartet	Eric Alexander in Europe	
1115	Steve Wilson Quartet	Four for Time	
1116	Greg Gisbert Sextet	On Second Thought	
1117	Tony Reedus Quartet	Minor Thang	
1118	Melvin Rhyne Trio	Mel's Spell	
1119	John Swana Sextet	In the Moment	
1120	Billy Drummond Quartet	Dubai	
1121	Jon Gordon Sextet	Witness	
1122	Tim Warfield Sextet	A Whisper in the Midnight	
1123	Scott Wendholt Quartet/Sextet	From Now On...	
1124	Grant Stewart Quartet	More Urban Tones	
1125	Orrin Evans Ortet	Justin Time	
1126	Seamus Blake Quintet/Sextet	Four Track Mind	
1127	Walt Weiskopf Nonet	Song for My Mother	
1128	Jim Rotondi Quintet	Introducing Jim Rotondi	
1129	Gary Smulyan	Gary Smulyan with Strings	
1130	Peter Bernstein Quintet	Brain Dance	
1131	Bill Charlap Trio	Distant Star	
1132	Ralph Lalama Quartet	Circle Line	
1133	Eric Alexander Quartet/Quintet	Two of a Kind	
1134	Clarence Penn Quartet	Penn's Landing	
1135	Bobby Broom Quartet	Waitin' and Waitin'	
1136	Steve Davis Sextet	Dig Deep	
1137	Melvin Rhyne Quintet	Stick to the Kick	
1138	Jon Gordon Quartet/Quintet	Along the Way	
1139	Javon Jackson and Billy Pierce	Burnin'	recorded in 1991
1140	Roberta Piket Quintet	Unbroken Line	
1141	Joe Magnarelli Quintet/Sextet	Always There	
1142	David Hazeltine Quintet	How It Is	
1143	The Tenor Triangle with the Melvin Rhyne Trio	Aztec Blues	
1144	Tim Ries Quintet	Universal Spirits	
1145	Ryan Kisor Quartet	Battle Cry	
1146	Adonis Rose	Song for Donise	
1147	Walt Weiskopf Sextet	Sleepless Nights	
1148	David Kikoski Trio	Inner Trust	
1149	Tim Warfield Quintet	Gentle Warrior	
1150	John Swana and Joe Magnarelli	Philly-New York Junction	
1151	Peter Bernstein Trio	Earth Tones	
1152	Steve Davis Sextet	Crossfire	
1153	Bill Charlap Trio	All Through the Night	
1154	Orrin Evans Ortet	Captain Black	
1155	Conrad Herwig Sextet	Heart of Darkness	
1156	Jim Rotondi Quintet	Jim's Bop	
1157	Scott Colley Quartet	Subliminal...	
1158	Sam Yahel	Trio	
1159	Jerry Weldon - Michael Karn Quintet	Head to Head	
1160	Kurt Rosenwinkel Quartet	Intuit	
1161	Greg Gisbert Septet	The Court Jester	
1162	Anthony Wonsey Quintet	Open the Gates	
1163	John Swana Quintet	Tug of War	
1164	Melvin Rhyne Trio	Kojo	
1165	Ralph Lalama Quartet	Music for Grown-Ups	
1166	Joe Farnsworth Sextet	Beautiful Friendship	
1167	Rodney Whitaker Quintet	Ballads and Blues: The Brooklyn Session	
1168	David Kikoski Quartet	The Maze	
1169	Walt Weiskopf Quintet	Anytown	featuring Joe Locke, Renee Rosnes, Doug Weiss, Tony Reedus
1170	David Hazeltine Trio/Quartet	A World for Her	
1171	Andy Fusco Quintet	Out of the Dark	
1172	One for All	Upward and Onward	
1173	Adonis Rose Quintet	The Unity	
1174	Joel Weiskopf Trio	The Search	
1175	Orrin Evans Trio	Grown Folk Bizness	
1176	Conrad Herwig Quintet	Osteology	
1177	Brad Mehldau, Mark Turner and Peter Bernstein: M.T.B.	Consenting Adults	recorded in 1994
1178	Steve Davis Sextet	Vibe Up!	
1179	Herlin Riley Quintet	Watch What You're Doing	
1180	Ryan Kisor Quartet	Point of Arrival	
1181	Jimmy Greene Sextet	Introducing Jimmy Greene	
1182	Mark Turner - Tad Shull	Two Tenor Ballads	recorded in 1994
1183	Melvin Rhyne Quartet	Classmasters	
1184	Jim Rotondi Sextet	Excursions	
1185	Richard Wyands Trio	Half and Half	
1186	Walter Blanding Quintet	The Olive Tree	
1187	Walt Weiskopf Nonet	Siren	
1188	David Hazeltine Quartet	Blues Quarters Vol. 1	recorded in 1998
1189	Gary Smulyan and Brass	Blue Suite	
1190	David Kikoski Trio	Almost Twilight	
1191	Michael Karn Quintet	In Focus	
1192	Wycliffe Gordon Sextet	The Gospel Truth	
1193	One for All	The Long Haul	
1194	Conrad Herwig Sextet	Unseen Universe	
1195	Orrin Evans	Listen to the Band	
1196	Ryan Kisor Quartet	Power Source	
1197	Seamus Blake Quartet	Echonomics	
1198	John Campbell Trio	Workin' Out	
1199	Tim Ries Septet	Alternate Side	
1200	Joe Magnarelli Quintet	Mr. Mags	
1201	Clarence Penn Quintet	Play-Penn	
1202	Alex Sipiagin Quintet	Steppin' Zone	
1203	John Swana and The Philadelphians	Philly Gumbo	
1204	Joel Weiskopf Quintet	New Beginning	
1205	Mike DiRubbo Quintet	Keep Steppin'	
1206	Ralph Peterson Quintet	The Art of War	
1207	Conrad Herwig Quartet	Hieroglyphica	
1208	David Kikoski Trio	Surf's Up	
1209	Jim Rotondi Quintet	Reverence	
1210	David Hazeltine Quintet	Good-Hearted People	
1211	One for All	Live at Smoke Vol. 1	
1212	Wycliffe Gordon Quintet	What You Dealin' With	
1213	Orrin Evans Trio	Blessed Ones	
1214	Peter Beets	New York Trio	
1215	Ryan Kisor Quartet	The Dream	
1216	Ralph Bowen Quintet	Soul Proprietor	
1217	Jesse van Ruller Quartet / Trio	Here and There	
1218	Steve Davis Quartet	Systems Blue	
1219	Walt Weiskopf Quartet	Man of Many Colors	
1220	Alex Sipiagin Quintet	Hindsight	
1221	J. D. Allen Quartet / Quintet	Pharoah's Children	
1222	George Colligan Quartet	Ultimatum	
1223	Adam Rogers Quartet	Art of the Invisible	
1224	Wycliffe Gordon Quintet	United Soul Experience	
1225	Ralph Peterson Quintet	Subliminal Seduction	
1226	David Kikoski	Combinations	
1227	Tim Warfield Sextet	Jazz Is...	
1228	Jeremy Pelt Sextet	Insight	
1229	Edward Simon Trio	The Process	
1230	Conrad Herwig Sextet	Land of Shadow	
1231	Mike DiRubbo Quintet	Human Spirit	
1232	Joel Weiskopf Trio	Change in My Life	
1233	Peter Bernstein + 3	Heart's Content	
1234	One for All	Wide Horizons	
1235	Jesse van Ruller	Circles	
1236	Alex Sipiagin	Mirrors	
1237	Peter Beets	New York Trio: Page Two	
1238	Wycliffe Gordon Quintet	Dig This!!	
1239	Ryan Kisor Quintet	Awakening	
1240	Ralph Peterson Quintet	Tests of Time	
1241	John Swana Quartet	On Target	
1242	Adam Rogers Quintet	Allegory	
1243	Ralph Bowen Quintet	Keep the Change	
1244	Jonathan Kreisberg Trio	Nine Stories Wide	
1245	Jimmy Greene Quartet	Forever	
1246	Joe Magnarelli and John Swana	New York-Philly Junction	
1247	David Hazeltine Trio	Close to You	
1248	Steve Davis Quintet	Meant to Be	
1249	David Kikoski Trio	Details	
1250	Walt Weiskopf Sextet	Sight to Sound	
1251	Jim Rotondi Quintet	New Vistas	
1252	Melvin Rhyne Trio	Tomorrow Yesterday Today	
1253	Wycliffe Gordon and The Garden City Gospel Choir	In the Cross	
1254	Conrad Herwig and Brian Lynch	Que Viva Coltrane	
1255	Ralph Peterson	The Fo'tet Augmented	
1256	One for All	Blueslike	
1257	Alex Sipiagin Sextet	Equilibrium	
1258	Reeds and Deeds	Wailin'	featuring Eric Alexander and Grant Stewart
1259	Orrin Evans	Easy Now	
1260	John Swana and The Philadelphians	Philly Gumbo Vol. 2	
1261	David Binney	Bastion of Sanity	
1262	George Colligan Trio	Past - Present - Future	
1263	Adam Rogers	Apparitions	
1264	Peter Beets	New York Trio: Page 3	
1265	Walt Weiskopf and Andy Fusco	Tea for Two	
1266	Jonathan Kreisberg Trio	New for Now	
1267	Edward Simon	Simplicitas	
1268	Conrad Herwig	Obligation	
1269	Grant Stewart	Grant Stewart + 4	
1270	Alex Sipiagin	Returning	
1271	Brian Lynch Latin Jazz Sextet	ConClave	
1272	Herlin Riley	Cream of the Crescent	
1273	Jesse van Ruller	Views	
1274	Victor Goines	New Adventures	
1275	Jim Rotondi	Iron Man	
1276	David Hazeltine Trio	Perambulation	
1277	Donny McCaslin	Give and Go	
1278	Wycliffe Gordon	Cone's Coup	
1279	Jimmy Greene	True Life Stories	
1280	Joe Magnarelli	Hoop Dreams	
1281	Danny Grissett	Promise	
1282	Steve Davis	Update	
1283	Reeds and Deeds	Cookin'	
1284	David Kikoski Quartet	Limits	
1285	David Binney	Cities and Desire	
1286	Adam Rogers	Time and the Infinite	
1287	David Hazeltine	Blues Quarters Vol. 2	
1288	Seamus Blake	Way Out Willy	
1289	David Binney and Edward Simon	Océanos	
1290	Melvin Rhyne	Front and Center	
1291	Victor Goines	Love Dance	
1292	Alex Sipiagin	Prints	
1293	Joel Weiskopf	Devoted to You	
1294	Adonis Rose	On the Verge	
1295	Jimmy Greene	Gifts and Givers	
1296	Peter Beets Trio	New Groove	
1297	Conrad Herwig	A Jones for Bones Tones	
1298	Gary Versace	Outside In	
1299	Danny Grissett	Encounters	
1300	Walt Weiskopf	Day In Night Out	
1301	John Swana	Bright Moments	
1302	Wycliffe Gordon	Boss Bones	
1303	Mike Moreno	Third Wish	
1304	Tim Warfield	One for Shirley	
1305	Ralph Bowen	Five	
1306	Kirk Lightsey	Lightsey to Gladden	recorded in 1991
1307	Lage Lund	Early Songs	
1308	Luis Perdomo	Pathways	
1309	Joe Cohn	Shared Contemplations	
1310	Jonathan Kreisberg	Night Songs	
1311	Alex Sipiagin	Mirages	
1312	David Kikoski	Mostly Standards	
1313	Adam Rogers	Sight	
1314	Marcus Strickland	Of Song	
1315	Danny Grissett	Form	
1316	Kendrick Scott	Reverence	
1317	Seamus Blake	Bellwether	
1318	Dr. Lonnie Smith	The Art of Organizing	
1319	Keyon Harrold	Introducing Keyon Harrold	
1320	Wycliffe Gordon	Cone and T-Staff	
1321	Lage Lund	Unlikely Stories	
1322	David Binney	Aliso	
1323	Jim Rotondi	The Move	
1324	Tim Warfield	A Sentimental Journey	
1325	Alex Sipiagin	Generations: Dedicated to Woody Shaw	
1326	David Hazeltine	Inversions	
1327	Walt Weiskopf	See the Pyramid	
1328	Walter Smith III	III	
1329	Peter Beets	Chopin Meets the Blues	
1330	Will Vinson	Stockholm Syndrome	
1331	Brian Lynch and Spheres of Influence	ConClave Vol. 2	
1332	Reeds and Deeds	Tenor Time	
1333	Stacy Dillard	Good and Bad Memories	
1334	Yakov Okun	New York Encounter	
1335	David Binney	Barefooted Town	
1336	Alex Sipiagin	Destinations Unknown	
1337	Danny Grissett	Stride	
1338	Mike Moreno	First in Mind	
1339	Opus 5	Introducing Opus 5	
1340	John Escreet	Exception to the Rule	
1341	Joe Cohn	Fuego	
1342	Ulysses Owens Jr.	Unanimous	
1343	Yosvany Terry	Today's Opinion	
1344	Joe Sanders	Introducing Joe Sanders	
1345	Dayna Stephens	Today Is Tomorrow	
1346	David Kikoski	Consequences	
1347	John Ellis	It's You I Like	
1348	Luis Perdomo	The 'Infancia' Project	
1349	Zach Brock	Almost Never Was	
1350	Clarence Penn	Dali in Cobble Hill	
1351	Opus 5	Pentasonic	
1352	Conrad Herwig	A Voice Through the Door	
1353	Wycliffe Gordon	The Intimate Ellington: Ballads and Blues	
1354	Alex Sipiagin	Overlooking Moments	
1355	Tim Warfield	Eye of the Beholder	
1356	Michael Rodriguez	Reverence	
1357	Luis Perdomo	Links	
1358	David Binney	Lifted Land	
1359	Orrin Evans	"... It Was Beauty"	
1360	Lage Lund	Foolhardy	
1361	Dayna Stephens	I'll Take My Chances	
1362	Dee Daniels	State of the Art	
1363	Philip Dizack	Single Soul	
1364	Seamus Blake and Chris Cheek	Reeds Ramble	
1365	Donald Edwards	Evolution of an Influenced Mind	
1366	Zach Brock	Purple Sounds	
1367	Misha Tsiganov	The Artistry of the Standard	
1368	Johnathan Blake	Gone, But Not Forgotten	
1369	Opus 5	Progression	
1370	David Binney	Anacapa	
1371	Justin Robinson	Alana's Fantasy	
1372	Manuel Valera and New Cuban Express	In Motion	
1373	Matt Brewer	Mythology	
1374	Brice Winston	Child's Play	
1375	Tim Warfield	Spherical: Dedicated To Thelonious Sphere Monk	
1376	Lage Lund	Idlewild	
1377	Dayna Stephens	Reminiscent	featuring Walter Smith III
1378	Alex Sipiagin	Balance 38-58	
1379	Adam Rogers and David Binney	R&B	
1380	Zach Brock	Serendipity	
1381	The Rodriguez Brothers	Impromptu	
1382	Danny Grissett	The In-Between	
1383	Opus 5	Tickle	
1384	Misha Tsiganov	Spring Feelings	
1385	Conrad Herwig and Igor Butman	Reflections	
1386	Donald Edwards	Prelude to Real Life	
1387	Luis Perdomo	Spirits and Warriors	
1388	Seamus Blake and Chris Cheek	Let's Call the Whole Thing Off	with Reeds Ramble
1389	Boris Kozlov	Conversations at the Well	
1390	Matt Brewer	Unspoken	
1391	Ethan Iverson	The Purity of the Turf	
1392	David Binney	The Time Verses	
1393	David Gilmore	Transitions	
1394	David Kikoski	Kayemode	
1395	Alex Sipiagin	Moments Captured	
1396	Mike Moreno	Three for Three	
1397	Noah Preminger	Genuinity	
1398	Victor Gould	Earthlings	
1399	Will Vinson	It's Alright with Three	
1400	Tim Warfield	Jazzland	
1401	Misha Tsiganov	Playing with the Wind	
1402	Lage Lund	Terrible Animals	
1403	Matt Brewer	Ganymede	
1404	Noah Preminger	After Life	
1405	David Gilmore	From Here to There	
1406	Opus 5	Swing on This	
1407	Donald Edwards	The Color of US Suite	
1408	David Binney	A Glimpse of the Eternal	
1409	Misha Tsiganov	Misha's Wishes	
1410	Mike Moreno	Standards from Film	
1411	Noah Preminger Trio	Sky Continuous	
1412	Lage Lund	Most Peculiar	
1413	Michael Feinberg	Blues Variant	featuring Noah Preminger (Ts / Fl), Nasheet Waits (D), Leo Genovese (P), Dave Liebman (Ss / Fl)
1414	Alex Sipiagin Quintet	Mel's Vision	featuring Chris Potter (Ts), Johnathan Blake (D), Matt Brewer (B), David Kikoski (P)
1415	David Hazeltine Trio	Blues for Gerry	featuring Peter Washington (B), Joe Farnsworth (D)
1416	Manuel Valera Quintet	Vessel	
1417	Jim Rotondi Quintet	Over Here	
1418	Michael Thomas	The Illusion of Choice	
1419	Gregory Groover Jr.	Lovabye	
1420	Antonio Faraò	Tributes	
1421	Misha Tsiganov	Painter of Dreams	
1422	Oz Noy	Fun One	
