= Another Standard =

Studio album by Bob Berg
- Released: 1997
- Recorded: 1996
- Studio: Sound on Sound (New York City, New York); Mad Hatter (Los Angeles, California)
- Genre: Jazz
- Length: 56:18
- Label: Stretch
- Producer: Bob Berg; David Kikoski; John Burk

Bob Berg chronology
| Riddles (1994) | Another Standard (1997) | The Jazz Times Superband (2000) |

Another Standard is an album by the American musician Bob Berg, released in 1997. Recorded for Stretch Records, it was Berg's first album of standards. Berg supported the album with UK and North American tours.

== Production ==
Berg was backed by pianist David Kikoski, bass player Ed Howard, and drummer Gary Novak; Randy Brecker contributed on flugelhorn and trumpet, and Mike Stern on guitar. Kikoski helped Berg arrange the songs and determine where they could substitute different key changes. "My Man's Gone Now" is a version of the composition from Porgy and Bess. "No Trouble", the only original on the album, was written by Berg.

== Critical reception ==
Professional ratings
Review scores
| Source | Rating |
|---|---|
| AllMusic | 2/5 stars |
| Birmingham Post | 4/5 stars |
| Ottawa Citizen | 3.5/5 stars |
| The Penguin Guide to Jazz on CD | 4/4 stars |
| Winnipeg Sun | 5/5 stars |

Another Standard is considered to be Berg's best album. The Independent wrote that Berg "is on good form, accompanied by a tidy rhythm section." The Guardian concluded that, "while several pieces do spiral off into hoarse, multiphonic orbits, for much of the time Berg's intonation (particularly on resolving notes) resembles Sonny Rollins, and he brings to theme statements heard a thousand times a hollow, mournful tremor that refreshes them in completely personal ways." The Columbia Daily Tribune labeled Another Standard "a near-classic jazz small-group recording."

The Record noted that "Kikoski is a shining talent who often serves as McCoy Tyner to Berg's John Coltrane." The Ottawa Citizen said that, "while the band's equipped with acoustic instruments, there's almost an electric fusion sensibility to the disc." The Birmingham Post opined that the version of the Beatles' "Michelle" "is saved from its usual schmaltz pit."

AllMusic determined that "the arrangements are lightly swinging, with a refreshing lack of electric piano or bass, and there's nothing really wrong with the album, it's just got an unshakeable air of 'been there, done that.'"

== Track listing ==
| No. | Title | Writer(s) | Length |
|---|---|---|---|
| 1. | "You and the Night and the Music" | | 6:07 |
| 2. | "Summer Wind" | | 4:37 |
| 3. | "Michelle" | | 6:36 |
| 4. | "Just in Time" | | 6:57 |
| 5. | "My Man's Gone Now" | | 7:30 |
| 6. | "All the Way" | | 5:35 |
| 7. | "No Trouble" | Bob Berg | 6:24 |
| 8. | "It Was a Very Good Year" | | 6:30 |
| 9. | "I Could Write a Book" | | 6:02 |

== Personnel ==
- Bob Berg – soprano saxophone, tenor saxophone
- David Kikoski – grand piano
- Ed Howard – bass
- Gary Novak – drums
- Mike Stern – guitars (7)
- Randy Brecker – trumpet (5, 9), flugelhorn (5, 9)

Production

- Chick Corea – executive producer
- Ron Moss – executive producer, management
- Bob Berg – producer, arrangements
- John Burk – producer
- David Kikoski – producer, arrangements
- Bernie Kirsch – recording, mixing
- Jordan D'Alessio – assistant engineer
- Zack Wind – assistant engineer
- Chris Bellman – mastering at Bernie Grundman Mastering (Hollywood, California)
- Evelyn Brechtlein – project coordinator
- Kevin Dahill – product manager
- REY International – art direction, design
- Armen Katchaturian – photography
- Karen Bennett – liner notes
