= Empire (Scott Colley album) =

Studio album by Scott Colley
- Released: 2010
- Recorded: June 1 & 4, 2009
- Studio: Sear Sound, New York City
- Genre: Jazz
- Length: 54:43
- Label: CAM Jazz; CAM 5036
- Producer: Ermanno Basso, Scott Colley

Scott Colley chronology
Architect of the Silent Moment (2007)	Empire (2010)	Seven (2017)

Empire is an album led by jazz bassist Scott Colley which was recorded in 2009 and released by the CAM Jazz label.

== Reception ==
Professional ratings
Review scores
Source	Rating
AllMusic	4/5 stars
All About Jazz	4.5/5 stars

The AllMusic review by Ken Dryden states "when Colley has had the opportunity to record as a leader, he has explored provocative originals interpreted with a crop of great players from his generation ... This often subtle release deserves a quiet setting to be truly appreciated, it is easily one of Scott Colley's finest recordings".

On All About Jazz, John Kelman's review called it "a sure contender for one of 2010's top picks" and said "Empire may have been a long time coming, but arrives with an even more definitive sense of purpose and, given the chameleon-like demands on Colley as a sideman, a clear, cohesive and cogent conceptual voice".

NPR's Kevin Whitehead noted "Colley's lyrical and catchy tunes bring Empire halfway home, but it's the players who complete the job; who breathe life into the frameworks he builds. This is heartland music born in Manhattan".

BBC Music's Lara Bellini said "Colley’s writing is superb ... Tagging along on his rhythmical discourse is an exciting, never predictable journey, and definitely never a soulless one. Colley is engaging, propelling the action forward with a relentless sense of swing, and Empire is excellent".

== Track listing ==
All compositions by Scott Colley

1. "January" – 4:53
2. "The Gettin Place" – 8:24
3. "For Sophia" – 5:20
4. "5:30 AM" – 7:23
5. "Speculation" – 6:46
6. "Tomorrowland" – 3:23
7. "Now What?" – 6:14
8. "Gut" – 4:07
9. "Five-Two" – 6:12
10. "Five-Two.2" – 2:01

== Personnel ==
- Scott Colley − bass
- Ralph Alessi – trumpet
- Craig Taborn − piano
- Bill Frisell – electric guitar
- Brian Blade - drums
