= Architect of the Silent Moment =

Studio album by Scott Colley
- Released: January 30, 2007
- Recorded: December 15–16, 2005
- Studios: Sear Sound, New York City
- Genre: Jazz
- Length: 56:33
- Labels: CAM Jazz; CAM 5021
- Producers: Ermanno Basso, Scott Colley

Scott Colley chronology
Initial Wisdom (2003)	Architect of the Silent Moment (2007)	Empire (2010)

Architect of the Silent Moment is an album led by jazz bassist Scott Colley which was recorded in 2005 and released by the CAM Jazz label in 2007.

== Reception ==
Professional ratings
Review scores
Source	Rating
AllMusic	4.5/5 stars
All About Jazz	4.5/5 stars
The Penguin Guide to Jazz Recordings	4/4 stars

The AllMusic review by Michael G. Nastos states "This is easily Colley's best recording of a small handful as a leader; it is a candidate for best jazz CD of 2007 and comes highly recommended".

On All About Jazz, John Kelman's review said "The beauty of Architect of the Silent Moment is its unequivocal sense of purpose, which avoids undue consideration and provides everyone with ample room to move".

JazzTimes's Thomas Conrad said "This is not an album that often settles into "solos." Colley creates shifting, intricate structures in which individual voices are embedded ... It is too early in the new year to vote, but Architect of the Silent Moment is on my working Top 10 list for 2007".

== Track listing ==
All compositions by Scott Colley except where noted

1. "Usual Illusion" – 7:43
2. "Strip Mall Ballet" – 8:03
3. "El Otro" – 2:59
4. "Architect of the Silent Moment" – 7:23
5. "Masoosong" – 6:15
6. "Feign Tonal" – 3:06
7. "From Within" – 8:17
8. "Smoke Stack" (Andrew Hill) – 6:07
9. "Window of Time" – 8:07

== Personnel ==
- Scott Colley − bass
- Ralph Alessi – trumpet
- Craig Taborn − piano, Rhodes piano, Hammond organ
- Antonio Sánchez – drums

=== Special guests ===
- David Binney – tenor saxophone
- Jason Moran – piano
- Gregoire Maret – harmonica
- Adam Rogers – guitar
