= Scott Wendholt =

American jazz trumpeter (born 1965)

Scott Wendholt (born July 21, 1965) is an American jazz trumpeter born in Patuxent River, Maryland.

Wendholt was raised in Denver, where he began playing trumpet when he was eight years old. He took a bachelor's degree at Indiana University in 1987, then played in Cincinnati in the Blue Wisp Big Band of John von Ohlen. He relocated to New York City at the end of the 1980s, where he studied jazz with Dave Liebman and played in a succession of Latin jazz ensembles. He had a house band at Augie's Jazz Club in Manhattan from 1991 to 1994. He has performed or recorded with Ralph Bowen, Chris Botti, Bill Cunliffe, David Berkman, Don Braden, Dwayne Burno, Alan Ferber, Kevin Hays, Vincent Herring, Jim McNeely, Roberta Piket, Tim Ries, Jim Trompeter, Klaus Suonsaari, Bobby McFerrin, Toshiko Akiyoshi, John Fedchock, Woody Herman, Bob Mintzer, Buddy Rich, Maria Schneider, Gary Smulyan, Mingus Big Band, Mike Holober, and George Gruntz.

== Discography ==
- The Scheme of Things (Criss Cross Jazz, 1993)
- Through the Shadows (Criss Cross, 1994)
- From Now On (Criss Cross, 1996)
- Beyond Thursday (Double-Time Records, 1997)
- What Goes Unsaid (Double-Time, 2000)
- Andthem with the Adam Kolker Quartet (Fresh Sound, 2014)
