= Jim Hall & Basses =

Studio album by Jim Hall
- Released: September 25, 2001
- Recorded: January 7–8, 2001
- Studio: Avatar Studio C (New York, New York)
- Genre: Jazz
- Length: 68:21
- Label: Telarc
- Producer: John Snyder

Jim Hall chronology
Jim Hall & Pat Metheny (1999)	Jim Hall & Basses (2001)	Magic Meeting (2004)

Jim Hall & Basses is an album by jazz guitarist Jim Hall performing duets and trios with bassists Dave Holland, Christian McBride, Charlie Haden, George Mraz and Scott Colley that was released by Telarc in 2001.

== Reception ==
Professional ratings
Review scores
Source	Rating
Allmusic	4/5 stars
The Penguin Guide to Jazz Recordings	3.5/4 stars

Ken Dryden, writing for AllMusic, said "Jim Hall is no stranger to guitar/bass duets after several memorable outings with the likes of Ron Carter and Red Mitchell, but this series of studio sessions is even more challenging, mixing it up ... Hall's skills as a composer are vastly underrated by the jazz audience as a whole, but his fellow players recognize his formidable skills. ... Hall's adventuresome streak as a composer, arranger, and performer continues to flourish"

The PopMatters review by Maurice Bottomly said that "this is not as immediately appealing a set as one would have hoped. It is worth getting to know but the whole project suffers from being a little too self-contained and introverted. Hall's inventiveness wins out in the end but it might take you at least a couple of listens to overcome the feeling that this is music for a specialist audience only"

In JazzTimes, Jim Ferguson wrote "In the hands of a lesser figure, a project such as this could easily turn into an exercise in excess, but Hall’s taste and integrity keep it on an artistic track throughout, making this a real treat for not only his admirers, but also anyone who appreciates fine, creative music".

== Track listing ==
All compositions by Jim Hall except where noted

1. "End the Beguine!" − 6:35
2. "Bent Blue" − 5:00
3. "Abstract 1" (Hall, Charlie Haden) − 4:31
4. "All the Things You Are" (Jerome Kern, Oscar Hammerstein II) − 6:22
5. "Abstract 2" (Hall, Scott Colley, George Mraz) − 3:24
6. "Sam Jones" − 3:11
7. "Don't Explain" (Billie Holiday, Arthur Herzog Jr.) − 8:39
8. "Dog Walk" − 6:21
9. "Abstract 3" (Hall, Colley, Mraz) − 5:10
10. "Bésame Mucho" (Consuelo Velázquez) − 6:14
11. "Dream Steps" − 4:16
12. "Abstract 4" (Hall, Colley) − 2:30
13. "Tango Loco" − 5:29

== Personnel ==
- Jim Hall – guitar
- Dave Holland –bass (tracks 1, 6)
- Christian McBride –bass (tracks 2, 8)
- Charlie Haden –bass (tracks 3, 7)
- George Mraz –bass (tracks 4–5, 9, 13)
- Scott Colley –bass (tracks 5, 9–13)
