= Jonathan Kreisberg =

American jazz guitarist

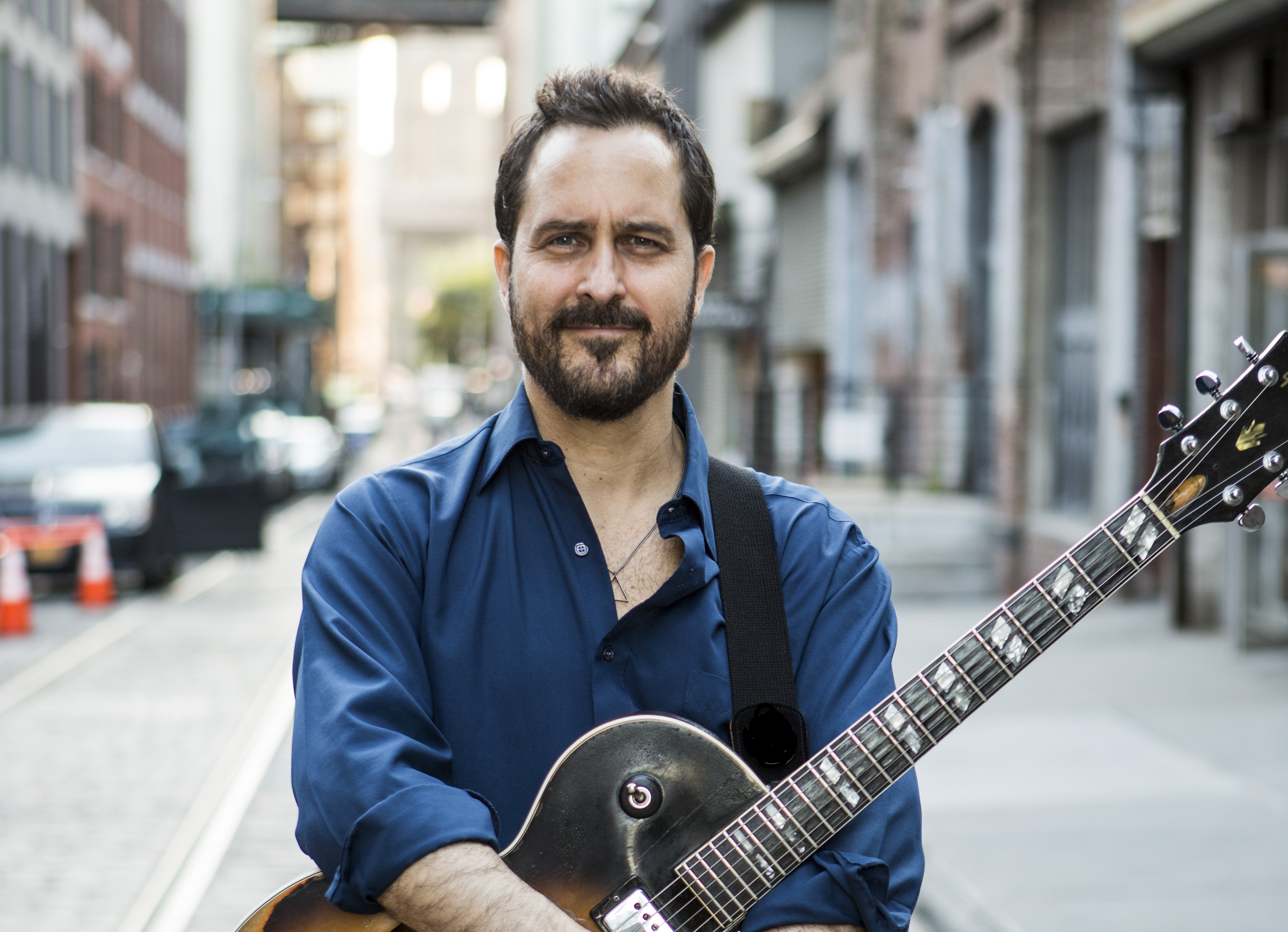

Background information
- Born: New York City
- Genre: Jazz
- Occupation: Musician
- Instrument: Guitar
- Years active: 1995–present
- Labels: Criss Cross, Mel Bay
- Website: jonathankreisberg.com

Jonathan Kreisberg is an American jazz guitarist.

== Career ==
He attended the University of Miami from 1990–1994. Since returning to his birthplace of New York City, Kreisberg has led groups including Larry Grenadier, Bill Stewart, Gary Versace, and Kevin Hays. He has released albums for Criss Cross, Mel Bay, and his own label, New For Now Music. Kreisberg was performer and producer on The Healer for Pilgrimage Records, performer on Evolution for Blue Note, and performer and associate producer on All in My Mind for Blue Note.

He has collaborated with Lonnie Smith and has performed as a sideman with Lee Konitz, Joe Locke, Ari Hoenig, Stefano di Battista, and Don Friedman. He has also performed 20th century works with the New World Symphony directed by Michael Tilson Thomas.

In 2017 he published Offerings of Note, his first book of compositions and transcriptions and a series of instructional videos titled Polyrhythmic Guitar. He also runs the New For Now Music intensive held annually in Brooklyn.

== Discography ==
=== As leader ===
- Third Wish with Wyscan (Batboy Music, 1995)
- Jonathan Kreisberg Trio (Batboy Music, 1996)
- Trioing (New for Now, 2002)
- Nine Stories Wide (Criss Cross Jazz, 2003)
- New for Now (Criss Cross Jazz, 2005)
- Unearth (Mel Bay, 2005)
- The South of Everywhere (Mel Bay, 2007)
- Night Songs (Criss Cross Jazz, 2009)
- Shadowless (New for Now, 2011)
- One (New for Now, 2013)
- Wave Upon Wave (New for Now, 2014)
- Kreisberg Meets Veras (New for Now, 2018) – rec. 2017
- Capturing Spirits: JKQ Live! (New for Now, 2019) – live

=== As sideman ===
With Lonnie Smith

- Spiral (Palmetto, 2010)
- The Healer (Pilgrimage, 2012)
- Evolution (Blue Note, 2016)
- All in My Mind (Blue Note, 2018)
- Breathe (Blue Note, 2021)

With Ari Hoenig

- Bert's Playground (Dreyfus, 2008)
- Punkbop Live at Smalls (Smalls Live, 2010)

With others

- Stefano di Battista, Woman's Land (Discograph, 2011)
- Joe Locke, Sticks and Strings (Jazz Eyes, 2007)
- Paulina Rubio, Paulina (Universal/Polydor, 2000)
