= Subliminal... =

Studio album by Scott Colley Quartet
- Released: October 13, 1998
- Recorded: December 20, 1997
- Studio: RPM Studios, NYC
- Genre: Jazz
- Length: 58:28
- Label: Criss Cross Jazz; Criss 1157 CD
- Producer: Gerry Teekens

Scott Colley chronology
Portable Universe (1997)	Subliminal... (1998)	This Place (2000)

Subliminal... is an album led by jazz double bassist Scott Colley which was recorded in 1997 and released by the Criss Cross Jazz label.

== Reception ==
Professional ratings
Review scores
Source	Rating
AllMusic	4/5 stars
The Penguin Guide to Jazz Recordings	2.5/4 stars

The AllMusic review by David R. Adler states "Scott Colley's writing reaches new heights on this very fine record ... the bassist delivers some of his most memorable compositions to date ... A superb, well-rounded, cohesive effort".

== Track listing ==
All compositions by Scott Colley except where noted

1. "Don't Ever Call Me Again" (Bill Stewart) – 5:48
2. "Sublimal..." – 8:13
3. "The End and the Beginning" – 4:34
4. "Turangalila" (Chris Potter) – 7:33
5. "Out of the Void" – 7:30
6. "Segment" (Charlie Parker) – 5:35
7. "Is What It Is" – 6:07
8. "Impossible Vacation" – 6:11
9. "Verbatim" – 6:23

== Personnel ==
- Scott Colley − bass
- Chris Potter - tenor saxophone, bass clarinet
- Bill Carrothers − piano
- Bill Stewart - drums
