= Alex Sipiagin =

Russian jazz trumpet and flugelhorn player

- Born: June 11, 1967 (age 59); Yaroslavl, Russia
- Genres: Jazz
- Occupations: Musician, educator
- Instruments: Trumpet, flugelhorn
- Years active: 1991–present
- Labels: Criss Cross, Sunnyside, ArtistShare, SkyDeck
- Website: alexsipiagin.com

Alex Sipiagin (born June 11, 1967) is a Russian jazz trumpeter and flugelhorn player.

== Biography ==
Sipiagin was born on June 11, 1967. He moved from Russia to the U.S. in 1990. His first major job in the U.S. was with the Gil Evans Band. He has played with Dave Holland, Mingus Big Band, Michael Brecker, and Mulgrew Miller. He has recorded many albums as a leader, twelve of them for Criss Cross Jazz. Sipiagin is a founding member of the band Opus 5 with Seamus Blake, David Kikoski, Boris Kozlov, and Donald Edwards. His album NoFo Skies was his first for Blue Room Music, but was recorded by the same quintet as his preceding Moments Captured. He is a faculty member at New York University Steinhardt.

== Discography ==
=== As leader ===
- Images (TCB, 1998)
- Steppin' Zone (Criss Cross, 2001)
- Hindsight (Criss Cross, 2002)
- Mirrors (Criss Cross, 2003)
- Equilibrium (Criss Cross, 2004)
- Returning (Criss Cross, 2005)
- Prints (Criss Cross, 2007)
- Out of the Circle (ArtistShare, 2007)
- Mirages (Criss Cross, 2009)
- Generations (Criss Cross, 2010)
- Destinations Unknown (Criss Cross, 2011)
- Overlooking Moments (Criss Cross, 2012)
- From Reality and Back (5Passion, 2013)
- Live at Smalls (SmallsLive, 2013)
- New Path (ArtBeat Music, 2014)
- Balance 38-58 (Criss Cross, 2015)
- Moments Captured (Criss Cross, 2017)
- NoFo Skies (Blue Room Music, 2019)
- Upstream (PosiTone, 2021)
- Ascent to Blues (PosiTone, 2022)
- Mel's Vision (Criss Cross, 2023)
- Horizons (Blue Room Music, 2024)
- Reverberations (Criss Cross, 2025)

With Opus 5

- Introducing Opus 5 (Criss Cross, 2011)
- Pentasonic (Criss Cross, 2012)
- Progression (Criss Cross, 2014)
- Tickle (Criss Cross, 2015)
- Swing On This (Criss Cross, 2022)

=== As sideman ===
With George Gruntz

- Liebermann (TCB, 1999)
- Merryteria (TCB, 1999)
- Expo Triangle (MGB, 2000)
- Global Excellence (TCB, 2001)
- Renaissance Man (TCB, 2002)
- Pourquoi Pas? Why Not? (TCB, 2008)
- Matterhorn Matters (MGB, 2010)

With Conrad Herwig

- The Latin Side of John Coltrane (Astor Place, 1996)
- Unseen Universe (Criss Cross, 2000)
- The Latin Side of Joe Henderson (Half Note, 2014)
- Reflections (Criss Cross, 2016)

With Dave Holland

- What Goes Around (ECM, 2002)
- Overtime (Dare2, 2004)
- Pass It On (Dare2, 2008)
- Pathways (Dare2, 2010)

With Monday Michiru

- Episodes in Color (SAR, 2002)
- Don't Disturb This Groove (Grand Gallery, 2011)
- Soulception (Adventure Music, 2012)
- Brasilified (Billboard, 2013)

With Mingus Big Band

- Live in Time (Dreyfus, 1996)
- !Que Viva Mingus! (Dreyfus, 1997)
- Blues & Politics (Dreyfus, 1999)
- Tonight at Noon (Dreyfus, 2002)
- Live in Tokyo (Sunnyside, 2006)

With others

- Toshiko Akiyoshi, In Shanghai (After Beat 2011)
- David Binney, Free to Dream (Mythology, 1998)
- Michael Brecker, Wide Angles (Verve, 2003)
- Bill Bruford, Earthworks Underground Orchestra (Summerfold, 2006)
- Larry Coryell, Sketches of Coryell (Shanachie, 1996)
- Deborah Cox, Destination Moon (Decca, 2007)
- Barbara Dennerlein, Outhipped (Verve, 1999)
- Robin Eubanks, More Than Meets the Ear (ArtistShare, 2015)
- Michael Franks, Watching the Snow (Koch, 2003)
- Michael Franks, Time Together (Shanachie, 2011)
- Mike Gibbs, Nonsequence (Provocateur, 2001)
- Elliot Goldenthal, S.W.A.T. (Varèse Sarabande, 2003)
- David Kikoski, The Five (DIW, 2002)
- Tony Lakatos, Blue Chili (Skip, 2023)
- Andy LaVerne, Faith (SteepleChase, 2017)
- Donny McCaslin, Declaration (Sunnyside, 2009)
- James Moody, Young at Heart (Warner Bros., 1996)
- Luis Perdomo, Spirits and Warriors (Criss Cross, 2016)
- Lonnie Plaxico, Rhythm & Soul (Sirocco Music, 2003)
- Dafnis Prieto, Back to the Sunset (Dafnison Music, 2018)
- Ruben Rada, Montevideo (Big World Music, 1996)
- Ryuichi Sakamoto, Smoochy (Gut for Life 1995)
- David Sanborn, Closer (Verve, 2005)
- Larry Schneider, Ali Girl (SteepleChase, 1997)
- Mark Sholtez, Real Street (Verve, 2006)
- Jim Snidero, MD66 (Savant, 2016)
- Manuel Valera, In Motion (Criss Cross, 2014)
- Gabriel Vicéns, Days (Inner Circle Music, 2015)
- Kevin Yosua, Direction (Big Hello Records, 2020)
