= David Binney =

American alto saxophonist and composer

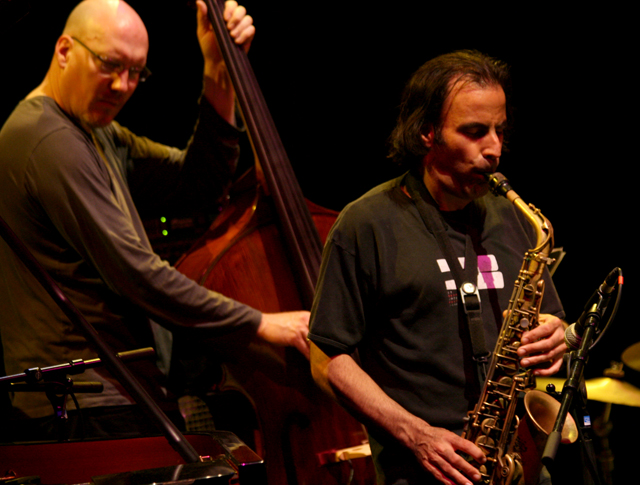

Background information
- Born: Miami
- Genre: Jazz
- Occupation: Musician
- Instrument: Saxophone
- Years active: 1990–present
- Labels: Mythology; ACT; Criss Cross
- Website: davidbinney.com

David Binney is an American alto saxophonist and composer.

== Career ==
When he was nineteen, he moved to New York City and studied with saxophonists George Coleman, Dave Liebman, and Phil Woods. A grant from the National Endowment for the Arts helped him record his first album, Point Game. In the 1990s, he started his own label, Mythology Records.

He has been part of several bands, including Knower, Lost Tribe, Jagged Sky, Lan Xang, the Gil Evans Orchestra, the Maria Schneider Orchestra, and Medeski Martin & Wood. He has also worked with Adam Rogers, Alex Sipiagin, Ben Monder, Ben Perowsky, Bill Frisell, Bobby Previte, Brian Blade, Cecil McBee, Craig Taborn, David Gilmore, Donny McCaslin, Edward Simon, Eivind Opsvik, Genevieve Artadi, Jacob Sacks, James Genus, Jim Black, Jim Hall, Kenny Wollesen, Knower, Leni Stern, Lonnie Plaxico, Mark Turner, Marvin "Smitty" Smith, Nate Wood, Scott Colley, Steven Bernstein, Thomas Morgan, Tim Lefebvre, Wayne Krantz, and Louis Cole.

== Discography ==
=== As leader ===
- Point Game (Owl, 1990)
- The Luxury of Guessing (AudioQuest, 1995)
- Free to Dream (Mythology, 1998)
- Afinidad with Edward Simon (Red, 2001)
- South (ACT, 2001)
- Balance (ACT, 2002)
- A Small Madness with Jeff Hirshfield (Auand, 2003)
- Welcome to Life (Mythology, 2004)
- Fiestas de Agosto with Edward Simon (Red, 2005)
- Bastion of Sanity (Criss Cross, 2005)
- This Life with Mario Franco (Tone of a Pitch, 2006)
- Cities and Desire (Criss Cross, 2006)
- Out of Airplanes (Mythology, 2006)
- Oceanos with Edward Simon (Criss Cross, 2007)
- In the Paint with Alan Ferber (Posi-Tone, 2009)
- Third Occasion (Mythology, 2009)
- Aliso (Criss Cross, 2010)
- Barefooted Town (Criss Cross, 2011)
- Graylen Epicenter (Mythology, 2011)
- Lifted Land (Criss Cross, 2013)
- Anacapa (Criss Cross, 2014)
- R&B with Adam Rogers (Criss Cross, 2015)
- The Time Verses (Criss Cross, 2017)
- Zinc City with Manuel Engel (Metonic, 2018)
- Aerial (Mythology, 2020)
- Basu with Kenny Wollesen (Mythology, 2020)
- Aerial 2 (Mythology, 2021)
- A Glimpse of the Eternal (Criss Cross, 2022)
- Where Infinity Begins (Mythology, 2022)
- Tomorrow's Journey (Ghost Note, 2022)
- Action (Mythology, 2023)
- In the Arms of Light (Mythology, 2024)

With Lan Xang

- Hidden Gardens (Naxos, 2000)

With Lost Tribe

- Lost Tribe (Windham Hill, 1993)
- Soulfish (High Street, 1994)
- Many Lifetimes (Arabesque, 1998)

=== As sideman ===
With Uri Caine

- Urlicht / Primal Light (Winter & Winter, 1997)
- Gustav Mahler in Toblach (Winter & Winter, 1999)

With Scott Colley

- Portable Universe (Free Lance, 1996)
- Architect of the Silent Moment (CAM Jazz, 2007)

With John Escreet

- Consequences (Posi-Tone, 2008)
- Don't Fight the Inevitable (Mythology, 2010)
- Exception to the Rule (Criss Cross, 2011)
- The Age We Live In (Mythology, 2011)
- Sabotage and Celebration (Whirlwind, 2013)

With Joel Harrison

- Free Country (ACT, 2003)
- So Long 2nd Street (ACT, 2004)
- Harbor (HighNote, 2007)
- The Wheel (Intuition, 2008)
- Urban Myths (HighNote, 2009)
- Multiplicity: Leave the Door Open (Whirlwind, 2014)

With Donny McCaslin

- The Way Through (Arabesque, 2003)
- In Pursuit (Sunnyside, 2007)
- Perpetual Motion (Greenleaf, 2010)
- Casting for Gravity (Greenleaf, 2012)
- Fast Future (Greenleaf, 2015)
- Beyond Now (Motema, 2016)

With Miles Okazaki

- Mirror (2006)
- Generations (Sunnyside, 2009)

With Samo Salamon

- Ela's Dream (Splasc(h) Records, 2005)
- Government Cheese (Fresh Sound New Talent, 2006)

With Edward Simon

- La Bikina (Red, 2011)
- Sorrows & Triumphs (Sunnyside, 2018)

With Alex Sipiagin

- Images (TCB, 1998)
- Equilibrium (Criss Cross, 2004)
- Destinations Unknown (Criss Cross, 2011)
- Balance (Criss Cross, 2015)

With others

- Anthony Branker, The Forward (Towards Equality) Suite (Origin, 2014)
- Vinicius Cantuaria, Cymbals (Naive, 2007)
- David Gilmore, Ritualism (Kashka Music 2000)
- Drew Gress, Heyday (Soul Note, 1998)
- Wayne Krantz, Howie 61 (Abstract Logix, 2012)
- Nguyen Le, Songs of Freedom (ACT, 2011)
- Joe Locke, Subtle Disguise (Origin, 2018)
- Medeski Martin & Wood, It's a Jungle in Here (Gramavision, 1993)
- Virgil Moorefield, Distractions on the Way to the King's Party (Cuneiform, 1994)
- Lonnie Plaxico, Short Takes (Muse, 1992)
- Chris Potter, Traveling Mercies (Verve, 2002)
- Antonio Sánchez, New Life (CAM Jazz, 2013)
