= Adam Cruz =

American jazz drummer from New York City

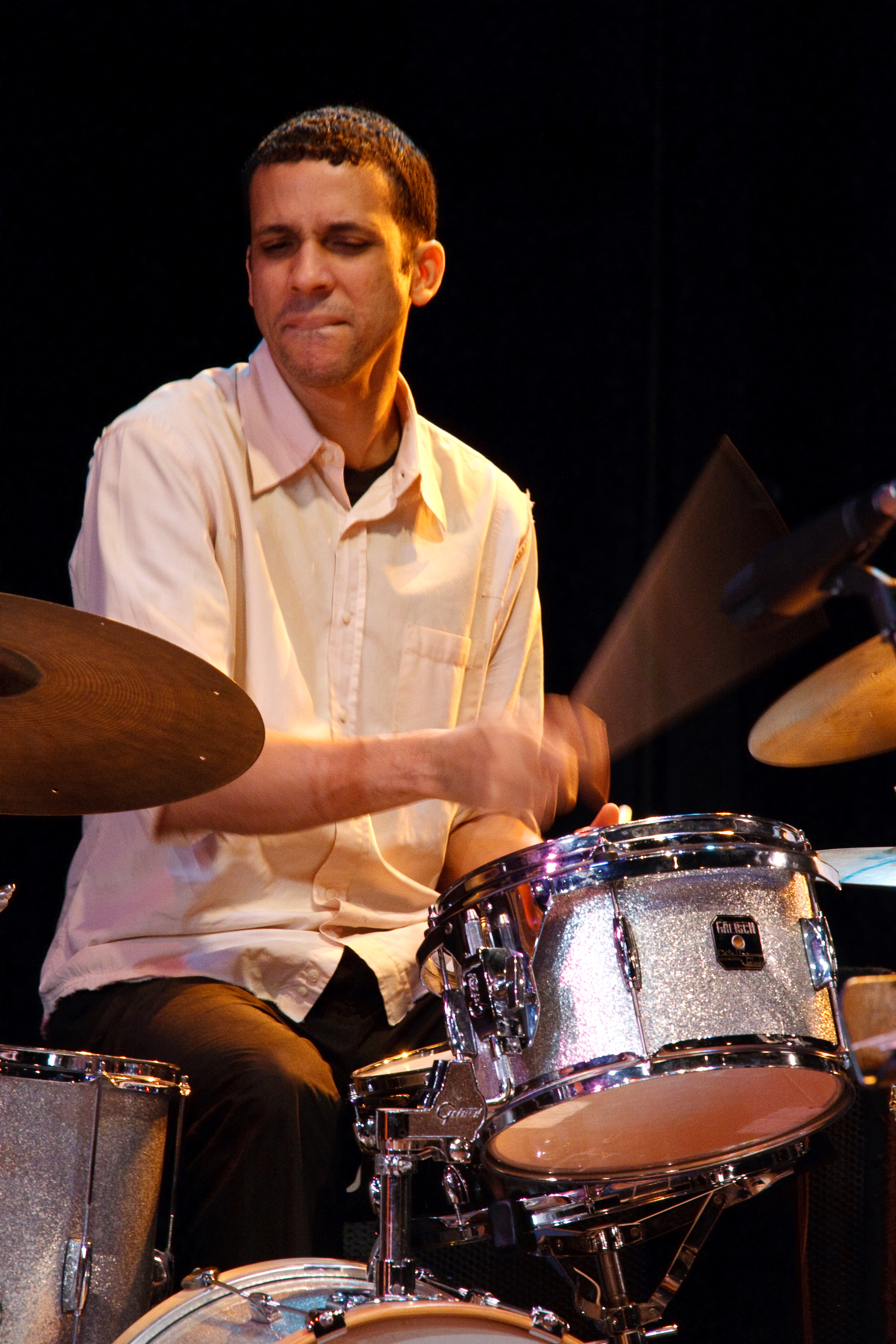
- Cruz in 2009

Background information
- Born: New York City, U.S.
- Genre: Jazz
- Occupation: Musician
- Instrument: Drums
- Labels: Sunnyside; Columbia
- Formerly of: Mingus Big Band
- Website: adamcruz.net}

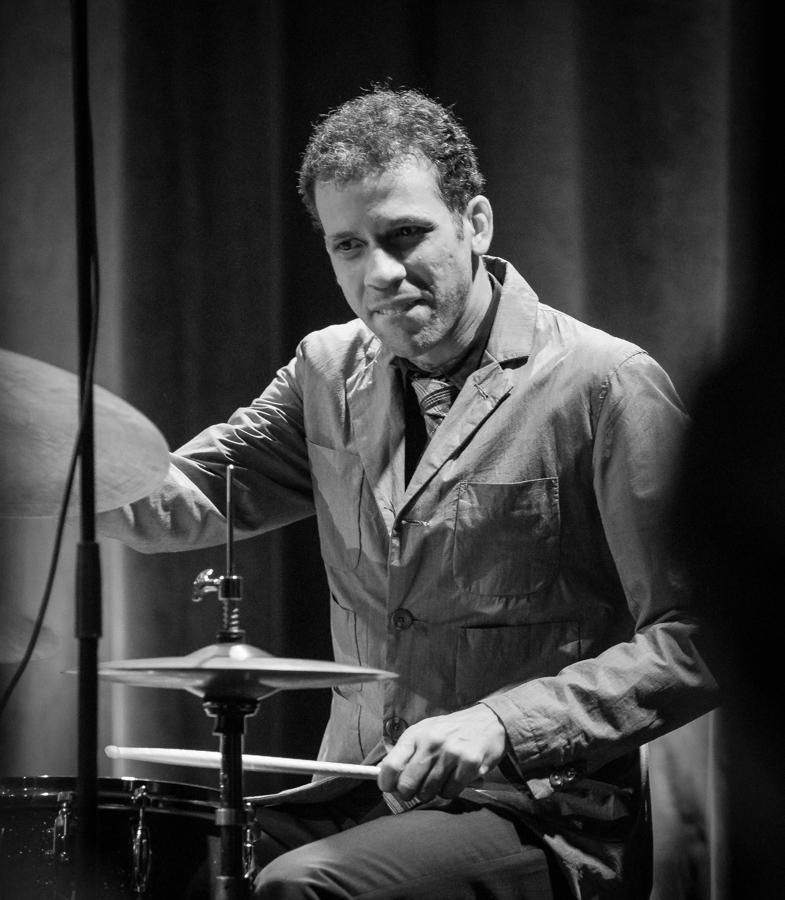
Cruz at the 2017 Oslo Jazz Festival

Adam Cruz is an American jazz drummer from New York City.

== Biography ==
He is best known for his work with pianist Danilo Perez, Tom Harrell, saxophonist Steve Wilson, David Sanchez, and pianist Edward Simon. He has also toured and recorded with the Mingus Big Band, saxophonist Chris Potter, guitarist Charlie Hunter, and Chick Corea's Origin.

Cruz's debut album as a leader was released in 2011 on Sunnyside Records. Milestone was given favorable reviews by the Los Angeles Times, Downbeat Magazine, and JazzTimes. The New York Times describes the album as "Informed by several strains of Latin music but just as meaningfully by brisk post-bop and lyrically minded free jazz".

== Discography ==
=== As leader ===
- Milestone (Sunnyside, 2011)

=== As sideman ===
With Tom Harrell

- The Art of Rhythm (RCA Victor, 1998)
- Paradise (BMG/Bluebird 2001)
- Trip (HighNote, 2014)
- Moving Picture (HighNote, 2017)
- Infinity (HighNote, 2019)
- Oak Tree (HighNote, 2022)

With Danilo Perez

- ...Till Then (Verve, 2003)
- Live at the Jazz Showcase (ArtistShare, 2005)
- Providencia (Mack Avenue, 2010)
- Panama 500 (Mack Avenue, 2014)

With Mingus Big Band

- Gunslinging Birds (Dreyfus, 1995)
- Live in Time (Dreyfus, 1996)
- Que Viva Mingus! (Dreyfus, 1997)
- The Charles Mingus Centennial Sessions (Jazz Workshop, 2022)

With Leon Parker

- Above & Below (Epicure, 1994)
- Belief (Columbia, 1996)
- Awakening (Columbia, 1998)

With David Sanchez

- Sketches of Dreams (Columbia, 1995)
- Obsesion (Columbia, 1998)
- Melaza (Columbia, 2000)
- Coral (Columbia, 2004)
- Cultural Survival (Concord Picante, 2008)

With Edward Simon

- Edward Simon (Kokopelli, 1995)
- Simplicitas (Criss Cross, 2005)
- La Bikina (Red, 2011)
- Venezuelan Suite (Sunnyside, 2013)
- Latin American Songbook (Sunnyside, 2016)
- Femeninas (ArtistShare, 2023)

With others

- Ester Andujar, Celebrating Cole Porter (Omix, 2005)
- Patricia Barber, Nightclub (Premonition, 2000)
- Ray Barretto, Standards Rican-ditioned (Zoho, 2006)
- Bruce Barth, Hope Springs Eternal (Double-Time, 1998)
- Bruce Barth, Where Eagles Fly (Fresh Sound, 2000)
- David Binney, Afinidad (Red, 2001)
- Anthony Branker, Dance Music (Origin, 2010)
- Francesco Cafiso, Angelica (CAM Jazz, 2009)
- Joey Calderazzo, Going Home (Sunnyside, 2015)
- Chick Corea, Live at the Blue Note (Stretch, 1998)
- Ronnie Cuber, In a New York Minute (SteepleChase, 1996)
- Paquito D'Rivera, A Night in Englewood (Messidor, 1994)
- Jon Gordon, Currents (Double-Time, 1998)
- Conrad Herwig, The Latin Side of John Coltrane (Astor Place, 1996)
- Klaus Ignatzek, Return Voyage (Candid, 1994)
- Brian Lynch, Spheres of Influence (Sharp Nine, 1997)
- Herbie Mann, America/Brasil (Lightyear, 1997)
- Herbie Mann, 65th Birthday Celebration (Lightyear, 1997)
- Armando Manzanero, El Piano (BMG/RCA, 1995)
- Virginia Mayhew, Nini Green (Chiaroscuro, 1997)
- Donny McCaslin, The Way Through (Arabesque, 2003)
- Sam Newsome, Global Unity (Palmetto, 2001)
- Bill O'Connell, Zocalo (Savant, 2013)
- Eddie Palmieri, Arete (TropiJazz, 1995)
- Eddie Palmieri, Vortex (TropiJazz, 1996)
- Dave Pietro, The Chakra Suite (Challenge, 2008)
- Chris Potter, Song for Anyone (Sunnyside, 2007)
- Bruno Raberg, Tailwind (Red Piano, 2018)
- David Virelles, Gnosis (ECM, 2017)
- Steve Wilson, Passages (Stretch, 2000)
- Steve Wilson, Soulful Song (MAXJAZZ, 2003)
- The Rodriguez Brothers, Reunited Live at Dizzy's Club (RB Music, 2023)
