= Clarence Penn =

American jazz drummer and composer (born 1968)

- Birth name: Clarence Lacquese Penn
- Born: March 2, 1968 (age 57); Detroit, Michigan, U.S.
- Genres: Jazz
- Occupation(s): Musician, composer
- Instrument: Drums
- Years active: 1980s–present
- Website: clarencepenn.com

Clarence Lacquese Penn (born March 2, 1968) is an American jazz drummer and composer.

== Early life ==
Penn was born in Detroit on March 2, 1968. He started playing the drums aged around eight. In 1986, while still at high school, he attended the Interlochen Arts Academy. He started studying at the University of Miami in Florida in 1986, but transferred to Virginia Commonwealth University.

== Later life and career ==
At Virginia Commonwealth, he studied with Ellis Marsalis, and played in the pianist's trio from 1987 to 1991, including for a tour of Japan in 1990. Penn graduated in classical percussion in 1991. He was part of vocalist Betty Carter's trio from around 1990 to 1993.

Penn later worked with David Sanchez, Jimmy Smith, Slide Hampton, Jimmy Scott, Greg Hatza, Stanley Clarke, Tim Warfield, Bob Berg, Diana Krall, Cyrus Chestnut, and Stephen Scott. In 1997, he recorded his debut album, Penn's Landing, for Criss Cross Jazz. Some of the tracks were composed by Penn. His second album as leader, Play-Penn, was recorded four years later.

== Discography ==
=== As leader ===
- Penn's Landing (Criss Cross Jazz, 1997)
- Play-Penn (Criss Cross Jazz, 2001)
- Saomaye (Universal, 2002)
- Dali in Cobble Hill (Criss Cross Jazz, 2012)
- Kind of Trio (Forced Exposure)
- Monk: The Lost Files (Origin)
