= Carola Grey =

Carola Grey, born Carola Gschrey (born August 5, 1968, Munich) is a German jazz drummer and composer.

Grey studied piano as a child, but switched to drums as a teenager after hearing the recordings of Gene Krupa. She attended the Hochschule für Musik und Tanz Köln starting in 1989; In 1991-1992, she took a break from study to travel to New York City, where she worked with Craig Handy and Ron McClure on her debut recording as a leader. In 1994, she obtained a master's degree in jazz percussion performance from the Hochschule. She then returned to New York to study jazz at Parsons College; her second album as a leader was issued in 1994, which included Ravi Coltrane and Mike Stern as sidemen. In 1995 she moved back to Munich and issued a third album.

== Discography ==
- Noisy Mama (Jazzline, 1992)
- The Age of Illusions (Jazzline, 1994)
- Girls Can't Hit! (Lipstick, 1996)
