= David Kikoski =

American jazz musician (born 1961)

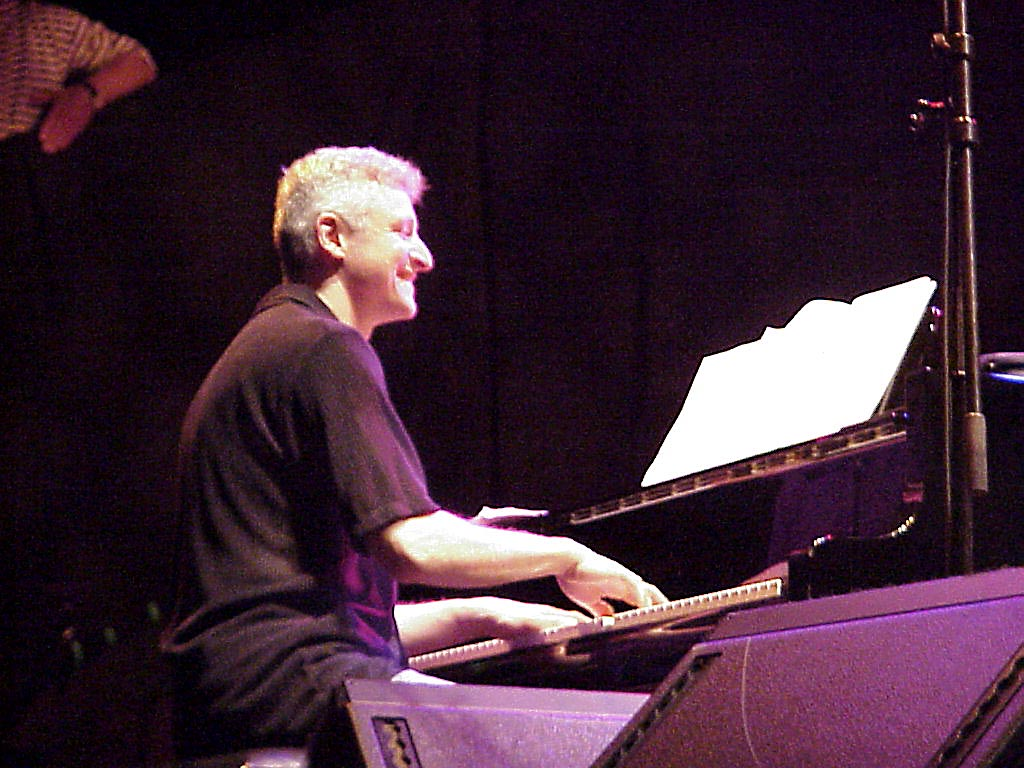
David Kikoski, July 2001

Dave Kikoski (born September 29, 1961) is an American jazz pianist and keyboardist.

== Biography ==
Born in New Brunswick, New Jersey, Kikoski learned piano from his father in Milltown, New Jersey, and played with him in bars as a teenager. He studied at the Berklee College of Music in the early 1980s, then moved to New York City in 1985, touring and recording subsequently with Roy Haynes (from 1986), Randy Brecker (1986–88), Bob Berg (1988), and Billy Hart (1989). He has also played or recorded with George Garzone, Barry Finnerty, Red Rodney, Craig Handy, Ralph Moore, Didier Lockwood, Joe Locke, Olivier Ker Ourio and Mingus Big Band. Kikoski had a Grammy nomination with Roy Haynes for the "Birds of a Feather" CD.

Kikoski has been a resident of Jersey City, New Jersey.

== Discography ==
=== As leader ===
Year recorded	Title	Label	Notes
1989	Presage	Freelance	Trio, with Eddie Gomez (bass), Al Foster (drums)
1991	Persistent Dreams	Triloka	With Randy Brecker (trumpet), Cecilia Tenconi (flute), Dave Jensen (tenor sax), Vadim Zilbershtein (guitar), Ed Howard (acoustic bass), James Genus (electric bass), Billy Hart and Ben Perowsky (drums), Alex Acuña (percussion), Vera Mera (vocals)
1994	Dave Kikoski	Epic	Trio, with Essiet Essiet (bass), Al Foster (drums)
1997	Inner Trust	Criss Cross	Trio, with Ed Howard (bass), Leon Parker (drums)
1998	The Maze	Criss Cross	Quartet, with Seamus Blake (tenor sax), Scott Colley (bass), Jeff "Tain" Watts (drums)
1999	Almost Twilight	Criss Cross	Trio, with John Patitucci (bass), Jeff "Tain" Watts (drums)
2001	Surf's Up	Criss Cross	Trio, with James Genus (bass), Jeff "Tain" Watts (drums)
2001	The Five	DIW	Quintet, with Alex Sipiagin (trumpet), Seamus Blake (tenor sax), Boris Kozlov (bass), Jeff "Tain" Watts (drums)
2001	Comfortable Strange	DIW	Trio, with Boris Kozlov (bass), Jeff "Tain" Watts (drums)
2001	Combinations	Criss Cross	With Seamus Blake (tenor sax), Boris Kozlov (bass), Jeff "Tain" Watts (drums)
2003	Details	Criss Cross	Trio, with Larry Grenadier (bass), Bill Stewart (drums)
2005	Limits	Criss Cross	Quartet, with Seamus Blake (tenor sax), Larry Grenadier (bass), Bill Stewart (drums)
2006	Lighter Way	Apria	Trio, with Ed Howard (bass), Victor Lewis (drums)
2008	Mostly Standards	Criss Cross	Trio, with Eric Revis (bass), Jeff "Tain" Watts (drums)
2008	Live at Smalls	Smalls Live	Trio, with Hans Glawischnig (bass), Obed Calvaire (drums); in concert
2012	Consequences	Criss Cross	Trio, with Christian McBride (bass), Jeff "Tain" Watts (drums)
2013?	From the Hip	BFM	Quartet
2016	Kayemode	Criss Cross	Trio, with Joe Martin (bass), Justin Faulkner (drums)
2019	Phoenix Rising	HighNote	Quartet with Eric Alexander (tenor sax), Peter Washington (bass), Joe Farnsworth (drums)
2021	Sure Thing	HighNote	Duo with Boris Kozlov (bass)
2025	Weekend at Smalls	Cellar Live	Quartet with Randy Brecker (trumpet), Joe Martin (bass), Billy Hart (drums)

=== with BeatleJazz ===
- A Bite of the Apple (Zebra, 1999)
- Another Bite of the Apple (Zebra, 2001)
- With a Little Help From Our Friends (Lightyear, 2005)
- All You Need is Love (Lightyear, 2007)

=== with Opus 5 ===
- Introducing Opus 5 (Criss Cross, 2011)
- Pentasonic (Criss Cross, 2012)
- Progression (Criss Cross, 2013)
- Tickle (Criss Cross, 2014)
- Swing On This (Criss Cross, 2021)

=== As sideman ===
With Roy Haynes

- True or False (Freelance, 1986)
- When It's Haynes It Roars! (Dreyfus Jazz, 1992)
- Homecoming (Evidence, 1994)
- Te Vou! (Dreyfus Jazz, 1994)
- Praise (Dreyfus Jazz, 1998)
- Birds of a Feather: A Tribute to Charlie Parker (Dreyfus Jazz, 2001) – Grammy nominated
- Love Letters (Eighty-Eight's, 2002)

With Billy Hart

- Amethyst (Arabesque, 1993)
- Oceans of Time (Arabesque, 1997)

With others

- Richard Baratta, Off the Charts (Savant, 2023)
- Bob Berg, Another Standard (Stretch, 1997)
- Pe De Boi, Power Samba Band (Arkadia Jazz, 1998)
- Craig Handy, Introducing Three for All + One (Arabesque, 1993)
- Toninho Horta, From Ton To Tom (VideoArts Music, 1998)
- Dave Lisik, Bonnie and Clyde (SkyDeck Music, 2017)
- Ralph Moore, 623 C Street (Criss Cross, 1987)
- Pat Martino, Remember: A Tribute to Wes Montgomery (Blue Note, 2006) – rec. 2005
- Alexander Claffy, Standards: What Are You Doing The Rest Of Your Life? (SMK Jazz, 2018)
- Klemens Marktl Trio Live In Austria(Fresh Sound Records 2021)
- Pulse Smack Dab (Fresh Sound New Talent 2025)
