= Brad Shepik =

American jazz guitarist

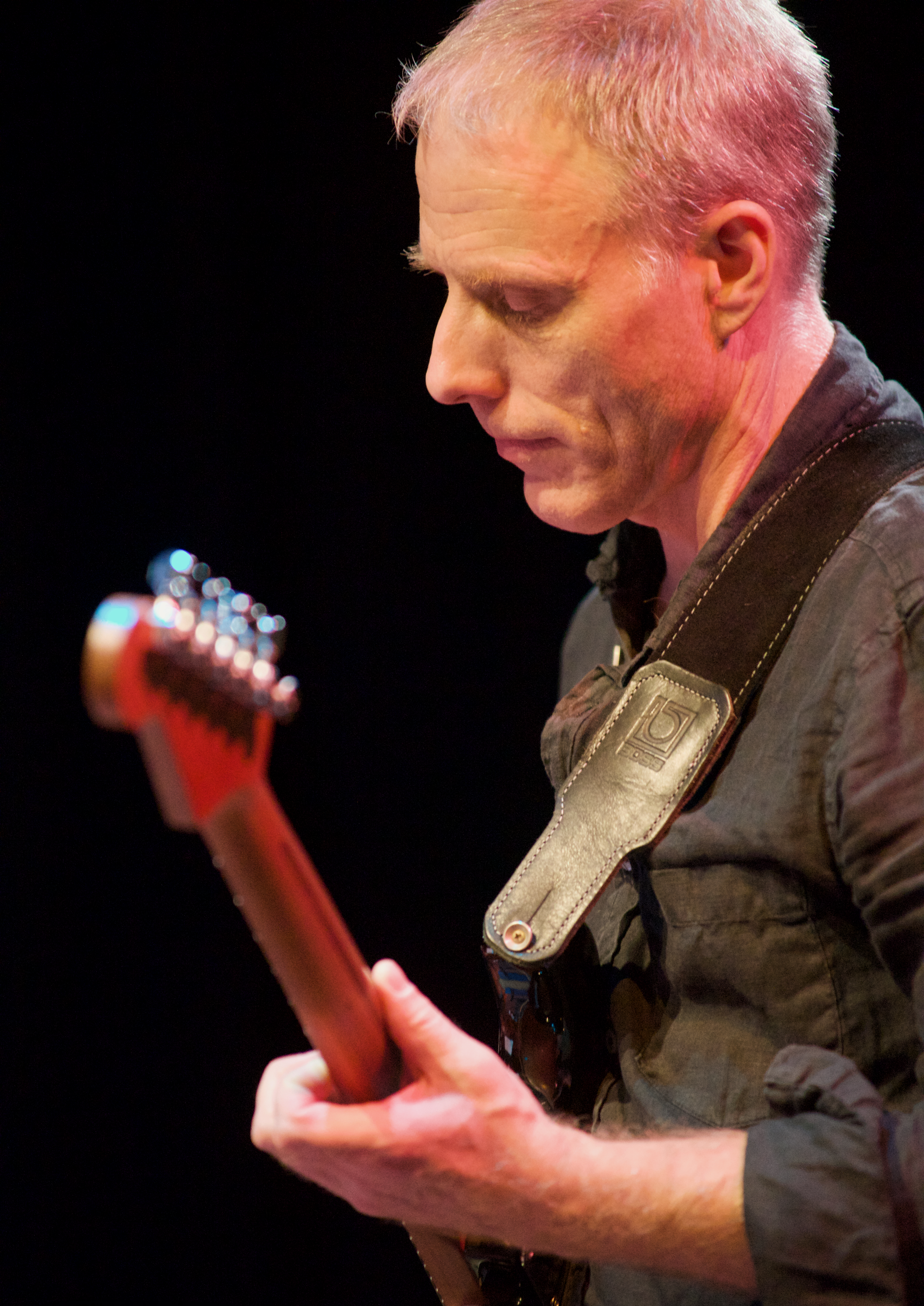
- Shepik performing in Amsterdam, 2018

Background information
- Born: Brad Schoeppach; February 13, 1966 (age 60); Walla Walla, Washington, U.S.
- Genres: Jazz, world music
- Occupation: Musician
- Instruments: Guitar, saz, and tambura
- Years active: 1990–present
- Website: bradshepikmusic.com

Brad Shepik, also known as Brad Schoeppach (born February 13, 1966, Walla Walla, Washington) is an American jazz guitarist. He also plays the saz and tambura.

Born Brad Schoeppach, he changed his last name to Shepik in the late 1990s. He played saxophone as a youth but switched to guitar as a teenager. He attended Cornish College of the Arts and New York University. In the 1990s he led his own ensembles with sidemen including Jim Black, Peter Epstein, Tony Scherr, Chris Speed, Skúli Sverrisson, and Kenny Wollesen.

He has worked as a sideman with Joey Baron, Carla Bley, Bob Brookmeyer, Matt Darriau, Dave Douglas, Charlie Haden, Franz Koglmann, Andy Laster, Paul Motian, Ken Schaphorst, George Schuller, Simon Shaheen, and Yuri Yunakov.

== Discography ==
- The Loan (Songlines, 1997)
- The Well (Songlines, 2000)
- Short Trip (Knitting Factory, 2001)
- Drip (Knitting Factory, 2003)
- Places You Go (Songlines, 2006)
- Human Activity Suite (Songlines, 2009)
- Across the Way (Songlines, 2011)
- Quartet 1991 (Songlines, 2016)
- Human Activity: Dream of the Possible (Shifting Paradigm, 2024)
