= Roberta Piket =

American jazz pianist, organist, and composer

- Born: 1965 (age 59–60); Queens, New York, U.S.
- Genres: Jazz
- Occupation(s): Musician, composer, arranger
- Instrument(s): Piano, organ
- Years active: 1990s–present
- Website: robertajazz.com

Roberta Piket (born 1965) is an American jazz pianist, organist, composer, and arranger.

== Life and career ==
Piket was born in Queens, New York, in 1965. Her father was composer Frederick Piket. She started playing the piano at the age of 7 and moved to jazz in her early teens. A university joint double-degree program led to her receiving a computer science degree from Tufts University and a jazz studies degree from the New England Conservatory of Music. While at university, she took private lessons from Stanley Cowell, Fred Hersch, Jim McNeely, and Bob Moses.

Her first album as leader was Unbroken Line, recorded for Criss Cross in 1996. Her first album for a U.S. label was in 1999: Live at the Blue Note, for Half Note. The 2003 release I'm Back in Therapy and It's All Your Fault was Piket's first with her Alternating Current ensemble. This band was formed after she acquired an electric piano to use in venues that did not have an acoustic piano and then discovered that it did not suit her trio but made her think of new types of music to play.

On Billy Mintz's 2014 album Mintz Quartet, Piket played piano, organ, and sang on one track. She had done the same thing for her earlier album, Sides, Colors, which also included several tracks she arranged for wind instruments, horn instruments, and strings. She was named Rising Star – Organ by DownBeat critics in 2018.

== Playing style ==
The DownBeat reviewer of Emanation (Solo: Volume 2) commented on the absence of a "steady pulse, stride or walking bass" in her solo piano playing; "Instead, she establishes momentum through a rhythmic motif [...and] keeps things moving through more intricate alterations between her hands".

== Discography ==
An asterisk (*) indicates that the year is that of release.

=== As leader/co-leader ===
Year recorded	Title	Label	Personnel/Notes
1996	Unbroken Line	Criss Cross	Most tracks quintet, with Donny McCaslin (tenor sax, soprano sax), Scott Wendholt (trumpet), Michael Formanek (bass), Jeff Williams (drums); some tracks sextet, with Javon Jackson (tenor sax) added
1999	Live at the Blue Note	Half Note	With Harvie Swartz (bass), Jeff Williams (drums), John O'Gallagher (alto sax, soprano sax)
2000*	Speak, Memory	Fresh Sound New Talent	With Masa Kamaguchi (bass), Jeff Williams (drums)
2000	Midnight in Manhattan	Meldac	Trio, with Michael Formanek (bass), Jeff Williams (drums)
2002*	Autumn of Tears	Meldac	Trio, with Rufus Reid (bass), Billy Hart (drums)
2003*	I'm Back in Therapy and It's All Your Fault	Thirteenth Note	Electric quartet, with Bruce Arnold (guitar), Cliff Schmidt (bass), Kirk Driscoll (drums)
2006*	Love and Beauty	Thirteenth Note	Trio
2011*	Side, Colors	Thirteenth Note	Some tracks trio; some have strings or wind instruments added
2012*	Solo	Thirteenth Note	Solo piano
2015*	Emanation (Solo: Volume 2)	Thirteenth Note	Solo piano
2016*	One For Marian: Celebrating Marian McPartland	Thirteenth Note	Sextet
2018*	West Coast Trio	Thirteenth Note	Most tracks trio, with Darek Oles (bass), Joe LaBarbera (drums); two tracks quartet, with Larry Koonse (guitar) added

=== As sidewoman ===
Year recorded	Leader	Title	Label
2014*	Billy Mintz	Mintz Quartet	Thirteenth Note
