= Pernell Saturnino =

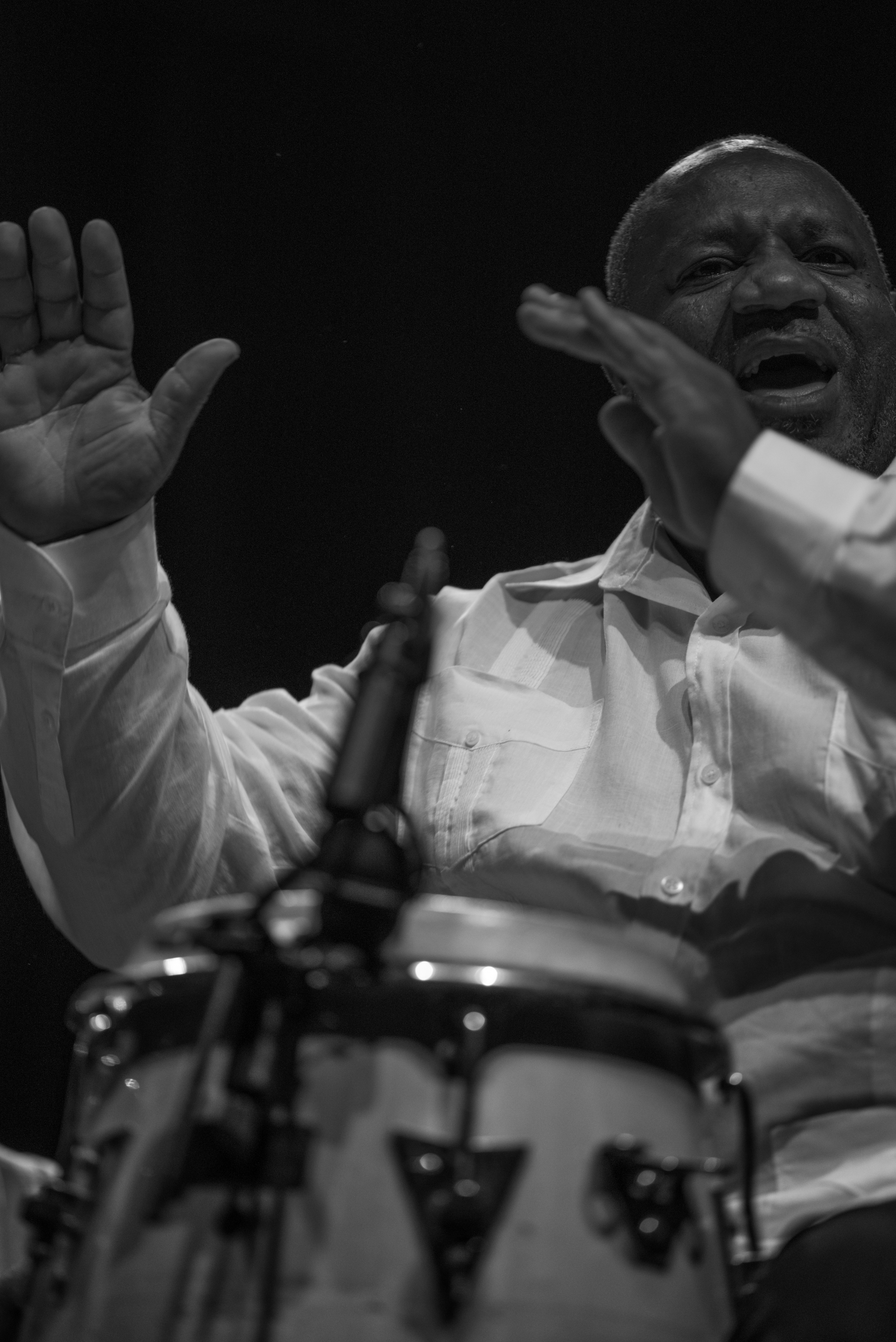
- Saturnino at International Jazz Festival of Punta del Este, 2015

Background information
- Born: 23 May 1962; Curaçao
- Genres: Jazz
- Occupation: Musician
- Instrument: Percussion
- Years active: 1980s–present

Pernell Saturnino (born 23 May 1962) is a percussionist from the Caribbean island of Curaçao. Saturnino joined the band Nos Antias as a teenager and toured the world with them. As part of Paquito D'Rivera's band, he won the Best Latin Jazz Album Grammy Award in 2007 for Funk Tango. He was nominated in the same category in 2006 for Diego Urcola's Viva.
