= AudioQuest =

American company specializing in audio equipment

AudioQuest is a company that was founded in 1980 by William E. Low and provides audio/video cables, digital-to-analog converters, headphones, power-conditioning products, and various audio/video accessories. The company is based in Irvine, California, has offices in the Netherlands and distributes its products to approximately 65 countries throughout the world.

== History ==
In the December 2008 issue of The Absolute Sound, AudioQuest's founder, William E. Low explained to TAS's Neil Gader, "Everything I’ve learned about hi-fi or cables is purely the result of being interested in getting high on music."

In his early days of selling high-end audio equipment, William E. Low allegedly discovered that the sound of an audio system was easily influenced by the quality of the cables connecting its various components. Hi-fi journalist, Richard Hardesty explained:

"With experimentation Bill found that better interconnect and speaker cables could make bigger audible improvements than many costly upgrades to amplifiers and speakers. And he recognized the opportunities afforded by this new category of audio components. He founded AudioQuest to explore and develop new and innovative wire, connectors and accessories."

Although AudioQuest remains best known for its analog and digital cables, the company has entered other product categories, such as the DragonFly USB digital-to-analog converter/headphone amplifier, recipient of numerous awards, including: Stereophile 's 2012 "Computer Audio Component of the Year" and 2012 "Budget Component of the Year;".

At the 2015 Consumer Electronics Show, AudioQuest entered the headphone market with its NightHawk over-the-ear headphones designed by Skylar Gray. In October 2014, NightHawk was named 2015 CES Innovation Award Honoree (Headphones) and 2015 Best of Innovation Winner (Eco-Design and Sustainable Technologies). The NightHawk was followed by the critically successful NightOwl headphone and a headphone stand called Perch.

== Ethernet cable evaluation ==
In their corporate literature, AudioQuest claims that their Ethernet cables are directional. This is a claim that goes against the Ethernet standard IEEE 802.3. In fact, an independent blinded ABX test of Ethernet cables at The Amazing Meeting in 2015 found that the cables' direction do not produce a measurable effect, again contradicting AudioQuest's claims. Note that the experiment focused on measured differences and did not test for subjective audible characteristics. One independent physical test of the data transmission quality of AudioQuest's Ethernet cables showed they perform no better than inexpensive class-compliant cables due to the AudioQuest's poor near-end crosstalk, though the testers admitted they weren't equipped to test Category 7 cables and instead tested the cable to the lower Category 6a spec. At the time of the test, a Category 7 TIA specification had not been established.

== See also ==
- High-end audio
- Stereophile
- Speaker wire
- Nordost Corporation
