= David Virelles =

Cuban jazz pianist and composer (born 1983)

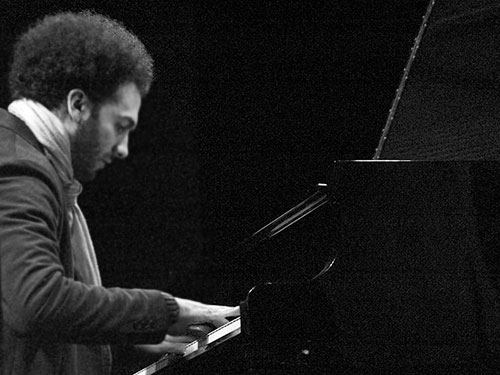
- Playing in Aarhus, Denmark

Background information
- Born: 1983 (age 42–43); Cuba
- Genres: Jazz
- Occupations: Musician, composer
- Instrument: Piano
- Years active: Early 2000s–present
- Labels: Justin Time, Pi, ECM

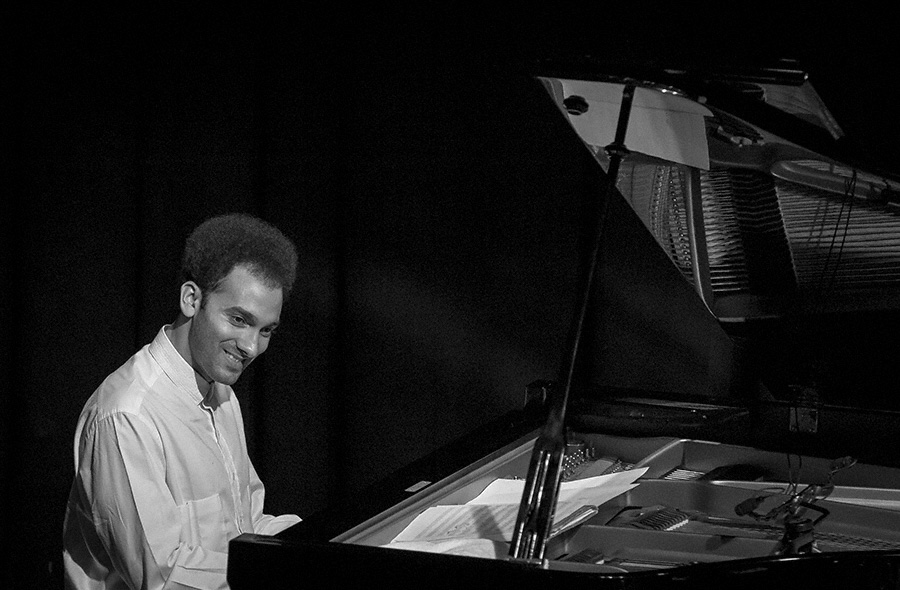
At Cosmopolite Scene in Oslo, 2016.

David Virelles (born 1983) is a Cuban jazz pianist and composer.

== Early life ==
Virelles was born in Cuba in 1983 and grew up in Santiago. His father is José Aquiles, a singer-songwriter; his mother was a Santiago de Cuba Symphony flautist. Virelles started classical piano studies at the age of seven and heard various forms of Cuban music during his childhood. He met Canadian musician Jane Bunnett in Cuba and she invited him to Toronto. He eventually studied at the University of Toronto and Humber College. Virelles also recorded and toured with Bunnett, including for her 2001 album Alma de Santiago. He started communicating via e-mail and telephone with Steve Coleman around 2006; the saxophonist gave him detailed responses to questions on music.

== Later life and career ==
A Canada Council for the Arts grant allowed Virelles to study with Henry Threadgill in New York. Virelles moved to New York permanently in 2009 and soon played with major jazz figures, including saxophonists Coleman, Chris Potter and Mark Turner.

Virelles was part of a trio in 2010, with bassist Ben Street and drummer Andrew Cyrille, that played largely improvised music. The pianist later added percussionist Román Díaz to this group. In 2011, Virelles played prepared piano, celeste and harmonium on Potter's album The Sirens. Virelles made his ECM Records leader debut with the 2014 release Mbókò. The Guardian reviewer reported that "Virelles explores ancient Afro-Cuban sacred and ritual musics through imaginative fusions with contemporary materials. Mostly he does this by using the two basses as drones, mixing spacious chord-moods with bursts of startling improvisation in a flux of styles, and focusing much of the melody-playing on [the two] drummers."

== Discography ==
=== As leader/co-leader ===
| Year recorded | Title | Label | Personnel/Notes |
|---|---|---|---|
| 2008 | Motion | Justin Time | Most tracks quintet, with Luis Deniz (alto sax), Devon Henderson (bass), Ethan Ardelli (drums), Luis Obregoso (percussion); some tracks sextet, with Mark Turner (tenor sax), Jose Aquiles (vocals), or Pablosky Rosales (guitar) added; one track septet, with Turner (tenor sax), Celso Machado (vocals, gimbri) added |
| 2012 | Continuum | Pi | Quartet, with Ben Street (bass), Andrew Cyrille (drums), Román Díaz (percussion) |
| 2013 | Mbókò | ECM | Quintet, with Thomas Morgan and Robert Hurst (bass), Marcus Gilmore (drums), Roman Diaz (biankoméko, vocals) |
| 2016 | Antenna | ECM | Nonet, with Alexander Overington (electronics, samples, cello), Henry Threadgill (alto Saxophone), Román Díaz (vocals), Marcus Gilmore (drums, MPC), Rafiq Bhatia (guitar), Etián Brebaje Man (vocals), Mauricio Herrera (percussion), Los Seres (percussion) |
| 2016 | Gnosis | ECM | With Román Diaz (vocals, percussion), Allison Loggins-Hull (flute, piccolo), Rane Moore (clarinet, bass clarinet), Adam Cruz and Alex Lipowski (percussion), Matthew Gold (marimba, glockenspiel), Mauricio Herrera (ekón, nkomos, erikundi, claves, vocals), Thomas Morgan (bass), Yunior Lopez (viola), Cristine Chen and Samuel DeCaprio (violoncello), Melvis Santa (vocals) |
| 2018 | Igbó Alákorin (The Singer's Grove) Vol. I & II | Pi | With José Ángel Martínez (bass), Lázaro Bandera (congas), Román Filiú (alto sax), René "La Flor" Domínguez (tenor sax), Baudelis Rodríguez (baritone sax), Abel Virelles (trumpet), Gabriel Montero (pailitas criollas, claves), Rafael Ábalos (timbal, güiro), Emilio Despaigne Robert and José Aquiles Virelles (vocals), Alejandro Almenares (requinto, vocals) |
| 2022 | Nuna | Pi | With Julio Barreto (percussion) |
| 2023 | Carta | Intakt | With Ben Street (bass), Eric McPherson (drums, percussion) |

=== As sideman ===
| Year recorded | Leader | Title | Label |
|---|---|---|---|
| 2001 | Jane Bunnett | Alma de Santiago | Blue Note |
| 2002 | Jane Bunnett | Cuban Odyssey | Blue Note |
| 2009 | Curtis Macdonald | Community Immunity | Greenleaf Music |
| 2011 | Chris Potter | The Sirens | ECM |
| 2012 | Tomasz Stańko | Wisława | ECM |
| 2013 | Jonathan Finlayson & Sicilian Defense | Moment And The Message | Pi Recordings |
| 2015 | Henry Threadgill | Old Locks and Irregular Verbs | Pi Recordings |
| 2016 | Tomasz Stańko | December Avenue | ECM |
| 2016 | Chris Potter | The Dreamer Is the Dream | ECM |
| 2018? | Román Filiú | Quarteria | Sunnyside |
| 2018 | Henry Threadgill 14 Or 15 Kestra: Agg | Dirt... And More Dirt | Pi Recordings |
| 2018 | Henry Threadgill | Double Up, Plays Double Up Plus | Pi Recordings |
| 2019 | Andrew Cyrille | The News | ECM |
| 2021 | Johnathan Blake | Homeward Bound | Blue Note |
| 2023 | Ohad Talmor | Back to the Land | Intakt |
