= Adam Rogers (musician) =

American jazz guitarist (born 1965)

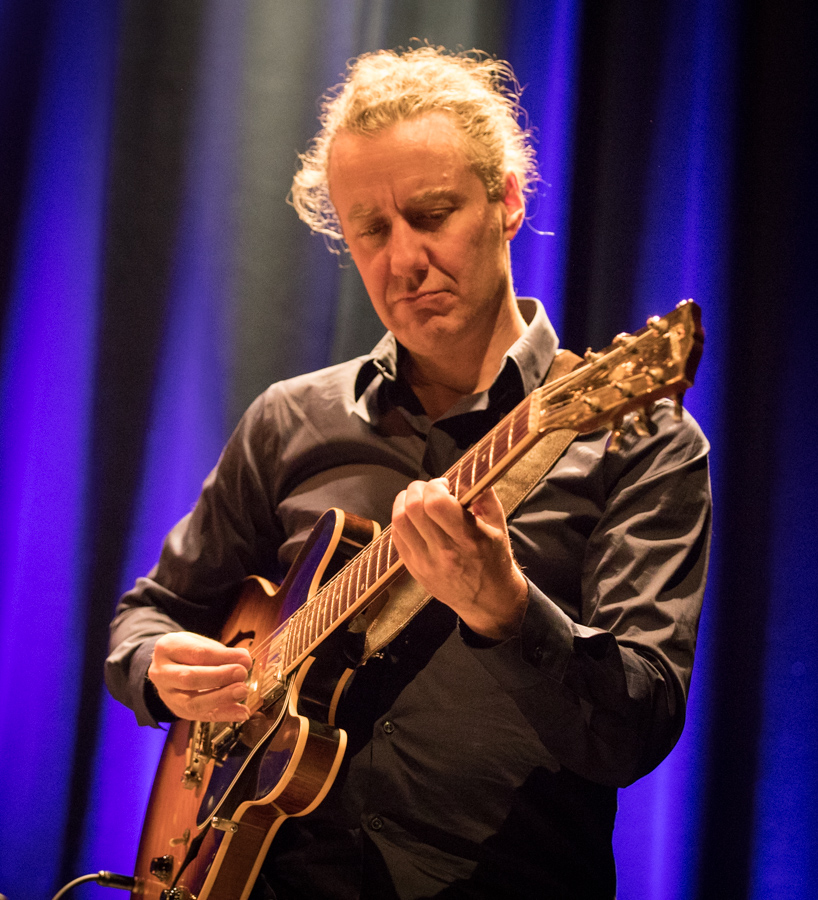
- Oslo, Norway, 2017

Background information
- Born: 1965 (age 60–61); New York City
- Genre: Jazz
- Occupation: Musician
- Instrument: Guitar
- Label: Criss Cross
- Formerly of: Lost Tribe
- Website: www.adamrogersmusic.com

Adam Rogers is an American jazz guitarist.

== Early life ==
The son of Broadway performers and musicians, he began playing piano and drums at just 5 or 6. He became "obsessed" with Jimi Hendrix and began collecting Hendrix recordings after starting guitar at age 11. He listened a great deal to the Hendrix recordings, and by 14 had learned to play in the style of Hendrix. It was at this time that he was exposed to the music of Charlie Parker, John Coltrane, Miles Davis, and Wes Montgomery and began to study jazz. His guitar teachers have included John Scofield and Barry Galbraith.

== Development ==
For five years, Rogers studied classical guitar at Mannes School of Music. Beginning in the 1990s, he spent over ten years as a member of the jazz fusion band Lost Tribe with David Binney, David Gilmore, Fima Ephron, and Ben Perowsky. For several years he was a member of Michael Brecker's bands, and was a founding member of the quartet Forq. He leads a quartet and the trio Dice.

He has also worked with Kenny Barron, Brian Blade, Walter Becker, Michael Brecker & Randy Brecker, Ravi Coltrane, Christian McBride, Uri Caine, James Carter, Regina Carter, Larry Coryell, Eliane Elias, Marcus Miller, Joe Jackson, George Russell, David Sanchez, Bill Evans, Gil Evans Orchestra, Forq, Norah Jones, Jack McDuff, Mingus Big Band, John Patitucci, Chris Potter, Paul Simon, Alex Sipiagin, Phillip Bailey, Kenny Werner, Cassandra Wilson, Lizz Wright, and John Zorn. He was a tour member with Steely Dan on their Earth After Hours 2022 tour.

== Discography ==
=== As leader/co-leader ===
- Art of the Invisible (Criss Cross Jazz, 2002)
- Allegory (Criss Cross Jazz, 2003)
- Structure (ACT, 2004)
- Apparitions (Criss Cross Jazz, 2005)
- Time and the Infinite (Criss Cross Jazz, 2007)
- Heaven on Earth (Half Note, 2009)
- Sight (Criss Cross Jazz, 2009)
- R&B (Criss Cross Jazz, 2015)
- Dice (Adraj, 2017)

With Lost Tribe

- Lost Tribe (Windham Hill, 1993)
- Soulfish (High Street 1994)
- Many Lifetimes (Arabesque, 1998)

=== As sideman ===
With David Binney

- Point Game (Owl, 1990)
- Free to Dream (Mythology, 1998)
- South (ACT, 2001)
- Afinidad with Edward Simon (Red, 2001)
- Balance (ACT, 2002)
- Welcome to Life (Mythology, 2004)
- Out of Airplanes (Mythology, 2006)
- Oceanos with Edward Simon (Criss Cross, 2007)
- Anacapa (Criss Cross, 2014)

With Ralph Bowen

- Dedicated (Posi-Tone, 2009)
- Due Reverence (Posi-Tone, 2010)

With Randy Brecker

- Into the Sun (Concord, 1997)
- Hangin' in the City (ESC, 2001)
- 34th N Lex (ESC, 2003)
- The Brecker Brothers Band Reunion (Piloo, 2013)
- Randy Pop! (Piloo, 2015)

With Regina Carter

- Reverse Thread (E1, 2010)
- Southern Comfort (Sony, 2014)

With Scott Colley

- Initial Wisdom (Palmetto, 2002)
- Architect of the Silent Moment (CAM Jazz, 2007)

With Alana Davis

- Fortune Cookies (Elektra, 2001)
- Surrender Dorothy (Tigress/Telarc, 2005)

With Bill Evans

- Live in Europe (Lipstick, 1995)
- Starfish & The Moon (Escapade Music, 1997)
- Touch (ESC, 1999)

With Giora Feidman

- The Dance of Joy (plaene, 1992)
- Klassic Klezmer (plaene, 1993)
- Klezmer Celebration (plaene, 1997)

With Phillip Johnston

- Phillip Johnston's Big Trouble (Black Saint, 1993)
- Music for Films (Tzadik, 1998)

With Norah Jones

- Come Away with Me (Parlophone, 2002)
- Turn Me On (Blue Note, 2002)

With David Krakauer

- Klezmer Madness! (Tzadik, 1995)
- Klezmer, NY (Tzadik, 1998)

With Monday Michiru

- Episodes in Color (SAR, 2002)
- Naked Breath (ArtistShare, 2004)
- My Ever Changing Moods (Geneon, 2008)
- Nexus (Pony Canyon, 2008)
- Don't Disturb This Groove (Grand Gallery 2011)
- Soulception (Adventure Music, 2012)

With John Patitucci

- Line by Line (Concord Jazz, 2006)
- Brooklyn (Three Faces, 2015)

With Yelena Eckemoff

- In the Shadow of a Cloud (L & H Production, 2017)
- I Am a Stranger in This World (L & H Production, 2022)

With Chris Potter

- Traveling Mercies (Verve, 2002)
- Underground (Sunnyside, 2006)
- Follow the Red Line (Sunnyside, 2007)
- Ultrahang (ArtistShare, 2009)
- Imaginary Cities (ECM, 2015)

With Edward Simon

- Simplicitas (Criss Cross, 2005)
- Sorrows & Triumphs (Sunnyside, 2018)

With Alex Sipiagin

- Images (TCB, 1998)
- Mirrors (Criss Cross, 2003)
- Returning (Criss Cross, 2005)
- Out of the Circle (ArtistShare, 2007)
- Generations: Dedicated to Woody Shaw (Criss Cross, 2010)
- Balance (Criss Cross, 2015)

With others

- Walter Becker, 11 Tracks of Whack (Giant, 1994)
- John Zorn, John Zorn's Cobra: Live at the Knitting Factory (Knitting Factory 1995)
- Groove Collective, We the People (Giant Step, 1996)
- New York Voices, New York Voices Sing the Songs of Paul Simon (RCA Victor, 1998)
- Sanne Salomonsen with Chris Minh Doky, In a New York Minute (Virgin, 1998)
- Jacky Terrasson, What It Is (Blue Note, 1999)
- Michael Philip Mossman, The Orisha Suite (Connector Music, 2001)
- Vitamin C, More (Elektra, 2000)
- Mingus Big Band, Tonight at Noon (Dreyfus, 2002)
- Michael Brecker, Wide Angles (Verve, 2003)
- Josh Roseman, Treats for the Nightwalker (Enja, 2003)
- Lizz Wright, Salt (Verve, 2003)
- Erin Bode, Don't Take Your Time (MAXJAZZ, 2004)
- Dennis Chambers, Planet Earth (BHM, 2005)
- Chiara Civello, Last Quarter Moon (Verve Forecast, 2005)
- Brooke Valentine, Chain Letter (Virgin, 2005)
- Malene Mortensen, Malene (Stunt, 2006)
- Taylor Haskins, Metaview (Fresh Sound New Talent, 2006)
- Brian Lynch, Eddie Palmieri, Simpatico (ArtistShare, 2006)
- Kenji Ozawa, Ecology of Everyday Life (Eastworld, 2006)
- Eliane Elias, Around the City (RCA Victor, 2006)
- Marcus Miller, Renaissance (Concord, Jazz, 2012)
- John Escreet, Sabotage and Celebration (Whirlwind, 2013)
- Forq, FORQ (Ropeadope/GroundUP music, 2014)
- Gonzalo Rubalcaba, Charlie (5Passion, 2015)
- Antonio Sanchez, The Meridian Suite (CAM Jazz, 2015)
- Nate Smith, Kinfolk: Postcards from Everywhere (Ropeadope, 2017)
- Tia Fuller, Diamond Cut (Mack Avenue, 2018)
- Joe Locke, Subtle Disguise (Origin, 2018)
