= Adam Rogers =

Adam Rogers may refer to:

- Adam Rogers (musician) (born 1965), American jazz guitarist
- Adam Rogers (Canadian football) (born 1985), Canadian football offensive lineman
- Adam Rogers, author of Proof: The Science of Booze (2014)
