= Line by Line =

Studio album by John Patitucci
- Released: September 25, 2006
- Studio: Avatar (New York, New York)
- Genre: Jazz
- Label: JVC Victor/Concord
- Producer: John Patitucci

John Patitucci chronology
Songs, Stories & Spirituals (2003)	Line by Line (2006)	Remembrance (2009)

Professional ratings
Review scores
Source	Rating
Allmusic	4/5 stars
All About Jazz	(favorable)

Line by Line is an album by jazz bassist John Patitucci released in 2006 by Concord Records. The album consists of Patitucci with saxophonist Chris Potter, guitarist Adam Rogers, and drummer Brian Blade. Patitucci wrote the compositions except for one by Rogers, one by Monk, a classical piece by Manuel de Falla, and a traditional spiritual.

== Track listing ==
All tracks are written by John Patitucci except where noted.

No.	Title	Length
1.	"The Root"	4:08
2.	"Agitato"	4:12
3.	"Circular"	6:28
4.	"Folklore"	6:26
5.	"Dry September" (Adam Rogers)	5:54
6.	"Nana" (Manuel de Falla)	3:27
7.	"Theme and Variations for Six-string Electric Bass and Strings"	9:37
8.	"Line by Line"	6:53
9.	"Evidence" (Thelonious Monk)	5:58
10.	"Jesus on the Mainline" (traditional)	3:18
11.	"Incarnation"	3:56
12.	"Soaring"	3:51
13.	"Tone Poem"	2:50

== Personnel ==
- John Patitucci – double bass, six-string bass guitar
- Chris Potter – tenor saxophone
- Adam Rogers – electric guitar, nylon-string guitar
- Jeremy McCoy – double bass
- Brian Blade – drums
- Richard Rood – violin
- Elizabeth Lim-Dutton – violin
- Lawrence Dutton – viola
