= Kinfolk =

The general meaning of the term kinfolk is "relatives, family".

Kinfolk may also refer to:

- Kinfolk (album), a 2007 hip hop album by Ali & Gipp
- Kinfolk: Postcards from Everywhere, a 2017 album by Nate Smith and his namesake band Kinfolk
- "Kinfolks", a 2019 song by American country music singer Sam Hunt
- Kinfolk Kia Shine (born 1980), an American hip hop rapper and record producer
- A group of characters in the World of Darkness fictional universe. See: Werewolf: The Apocalypse#Breed Forms
- Kinfolk (magazine), a quarterly entertaining magazine based in Copenhagen, Denmark
- A 1949 novel by American writer Pearl S. Buck
