= Ultrahang =

Studio album by Chris Potter Underground
- Released: 2009
- Recorded: 2009
- Studios: Avatar, New York City
- Genre: Jazz
- Length: 62:23
- Label: ArtistShare
- Producer: Chris Potter

Chris Potter chronology
Follow the Red Line (2007)	Ultrahang (2009)	Transatlantic (2011)

Ultrahang is an album by jazz saxophonist Chris Potter released on the label ArtistShare in 2009. It features keyboardist Craig Taborn, guitarist Adam Rogers and drummer Nate Smith.

== Reception ==
Professional ratings
Review scores
Source	Rating
Allmusic	4.5/5 stars
All About Jazz	4.5/5 stars
All About Jazz	4.5/5 stars

The Allmusic review by Michael G. Nastos awarded the album 4 1/2 stars stating "Potter has been at the forefront of progressive and contemporary jazz since the founding of this ensemble, one that all younger listeners should champion, and deserves high marks in the annals of new jazz as presenting one of the more innovative approaches in the decade of the 2000s. Ultrahang comes highly recommended". All About Jazz correspondent John Kelman observed "With a group this versatile, there's little Underground can't do. Still, it speaks with a clear voice that incorporates elements of M-Base mathematics, funk, fusion, and folkloric pop references into a unique mélange that, based on the trajectory of Underground, Follow the Red Line and, now, Ultrahang, has nowhere to continue but up". Another review by David Miller stated "The end result is a superbly constructed group effort. Underground manages to stay true to its brand of gritty, muscular funk while expanding its repertoire and bringing in other outside influences. Ultrahang is a faithful document of the evolution of a great band that is even better live".

== Track listing ==
All compositions by Chris Potter except where indicated

1. "Ultrahang" − 6:46
2. "Facing East" − 9:57
3. "Rumples" (Adam Rogers) − 7:14
4. "It Ain't Me, Babe" (Bob Dylan) − 5:18
5. "Time's Arrow" − 9:12
6. "Small Wonder" − 7:27
7. "Boots" − 10:00
8. "Interstellar Signals" − 6:29

== Personnel ==
- Chris Potter - tenor saxophone, bass clarinet
- Adam Rogers − guitar
- Craig Taborn - Fender Rhodes
- Nate Smith - drums
