= Erica von Kleist =

- Born: March 9, 1982; Connecticut, U.S.
- Genres: Jazz
- Occupation(s): Musician, composer
- Instrument(s): Flute, saxophone
- Website: www.ericavonkleist.com

Erica von Kleist is a jazz flautist, saxophonist, and composer. She is a descendant of the Pomeranian Prussian noble family von Kleist. As an educator, She has taught privately for over 15 years. She has released three albums as a bandleader – Project E in 2005, Erica von Kleist & No Exceptions in 2009 and Alpine Clarity in 2014

== Music career ==
Von Kleist was born in Connecticut and took piano lessons at the age of five. When she was nine, she became interested in the flute after hearing music from the movie The Little Mermaid. She went to Hall High School in West Hartford, CT, a school famous for its strong Jazz program, and was part of the jazz band when it won the Essentially Ellington Competition at Jazz at Lincoln Center.

Von Kleist went to the Manhattan School of Music, then Juilliard, graduating in 2004. She toured with the Afro Latin Jazz Orchestra and appeared on two of their albums which were nominated for Grammy Awards. She has performed or recorded with Wynton Marsalis and the Jazz at Lincoln Center Orchestra, Darcy James Argue's Secret Society, and Seth MacFarlane. Her debut album was Project E (2005), followed by Erica von Kleist and No Exceptions (2010), and Alpine Clarity (2014). In 2012, she left New York City and moved to Montana, where she performs, records, teaches, and runs two businesses.

As an educator, von Kleist has participated in Horns to Havana, which gives musical instruments to students in Cuba.

== Awards ==
- ASCAP Young Jazz Composer’s Award
- Martin E. Segal Award from Lincoln Center

== Discography ==
With Chris Potter

- Song for Anyone (Sunnyside, 2007)
