= Nate Smith (drummer) =

American drummer (born 1974)

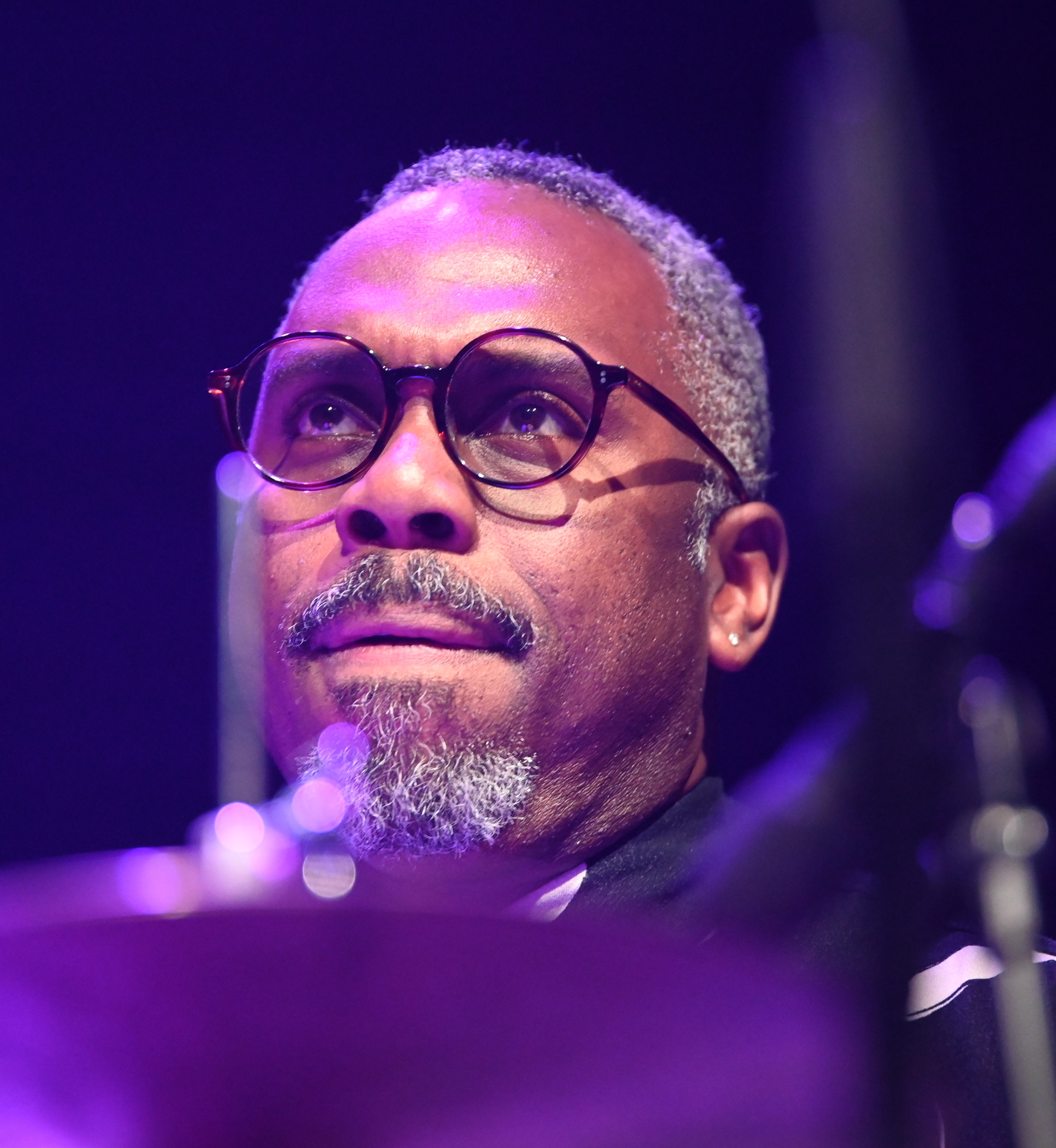
- Smith in 2026

Background information
- Born: Ira Nathaniel Smith; December 14, 1974 (age 51); Chesapeake, Virginia, United States
- Genres: Jazz; funk; R&B; hip-hop; rock
- Occupations: Drummer; composer; record producer
- Instruments: Drums; piano
- Labels: Waterbaby Music; Ropeadope; Edition; Naïve
- Website: www.natesmithdrums.com

Ira Nathaniel "Nate" Smith (born December 14, 1974) is an American drummer, composer, and record producer. His sixth album, Live-Action (2025), won two Grammy Awards for Best Alternative Jazz Album and Best Arrangement, Instrumental and Vocals.

== Life and career ==
Smith was born in Chesapeake, Virginia, and started playing drums at age 11, initially influenced by rock and funk music. At 16, he developed an interest in jazz after listening to Album of the Year by Art Blakey and the Jazz Messengers. Smith studied media art and design at James Madison University. While at James Madison, he performed at the Conference of the International Association for Jazz Education in Atlanta, where he met Betty Carter, who invited him to joint performances at the Blue Note in New York City. Smith went to graduate school at Virginia Commonwealth University, where he met Dave Holland and joined Holland's quintet in 2003. Smith appears on the albums Critical Mass (2005) and Pathways (2009). In 2017, he released his first album as leader, Kinfolk: Postcards from Everywhere on Ropeadope Records. In 2018 Smith cowrote and performed in the self-titled, debut EP release from the Vulfpeck spin-off group The Fearless Flyers, later going on a US tour with the group. The group has released four EPs and two albums. In early 2025, he released the collaborative cross-genre album "LIVE-ACTION", which was nominated for and won the Grammy Award for Best Alternative Jazz Album. The single "Big Fish" from the album, featuring the vocal group säje, was also nominated for and won the Grammy Award for Best Arrangement, Instrumental and Vocals.

Smith has composed soundtracks for broadcast documentaries on Discovery Channel and The Learning Channel. He co-wrote and produced the Michael Jackson song "Heaven Can Wait".

At the 2025 Festival International de Jazz de Montréal in Canada, Smith performed at the Théâtre Jean-Duceppe on 30 June 2025 alongside singer Lalah Hathaway, pianist James Francies and bassist Derrick Hodge. He also gave a drum masterclass as part of the festival in Montréal.

== Discography ==
=== As leader ===
- Workday, Waterbaby Music Vol. 1 (Waterbaby Music, 2008)
- Kinfolk: Postcards from Everywhere (Ropeadope, 2017)
- Pocket Change (Waterbaby Music, 2018)
- Light and Shadow (Waterbaby Music, 2020)
- Kinfolk 2: See the Birds (Edition, 2021)
- Pocket Change 2: Mad Currency (Waterbaby Music, 2023)
- Live-Action (Waterbaby Music, 2025)

=== As sideman ===
With Robin Eubanks

- Klassik Rock Vol. 1 (ArtistShare, 2014)
- More Than Meets the Ear (ArtistShare, 2015)

With Dave Holland

- Critical Mass (Dare2, 2006)
- Pathways (Dare2, 2010)

With Brittany Howard

- Jaime (ATO, 2019)
- What Now (Island, 2024)

With Jose James

- Love in a Time of Madness (Blue Note, 2017)
- Lean on Me (Blue Note, 2018)

With Chris Potter

- Underground (Sunnyside, 2006)
- Follow the Red Line (Sunnyside, 2007)
- Ultrahang (ArtistShare, 2009)
- Imaginary Cities (ECM, 2015)

With others

- Patricia Barber, The Cole Porter Mix (Blue Note, 2008)
- Randy Brecker, Randy Pop! (Piloo, 2015)
- Scott Colley, Seven (ArtistShare, 2017)
- Nir Felder, Golden Age (Okeh, 2014)
- Takuya Kuroda, Rising Son (Blue Note, 2014)
- Monday Michiru, Don't Disturb This Groove (Grand Gallery, 2011)
- Eric Roberson, Fire (Blue Erro Soul, 2017)
- Adam Rogers, Dice (Adraj, 2017)
- Karel Ruzicka, Grace & Gratitude (Animal Music, 2018)
- Paul Simon, In the Blue Light (Legacy, 2018)
- Alex Sipiagin, Live at Smalls (Smalls, 2013)
- Somi, Petite Afrique (Okeh, 2017)
- The Fearless Flyers, The Fearless Flyers (Vulf, 2018), The Fearless Flyers II (Vulf, 2019), Tailwinds (Vulf, 2020), The Fearless Flyers III (Vulf, 2022), The Fearless Flyers IV (Vulf, 2024), The Fearless Flyers V (Roundwound Media, 2025)

== Equipment ==
Smith endorses Zildjian cymbals, Ludwig drums, Vic firths sticks/mallets/beaters, and Evans drumheads.
