= Sunrise Reprise =

Studio album by Chris Potter
- Released: 2021
- Recorded: September 19, 2020
- Studio: GSI Studios
- Genre: Jazz
- Length: 54:09
- Label: Edition Records
- Producer: Chris Potter

Chris Potter chronology
| There Is a Tide (2020) | Sunrise Reprise (2021) | Got the Keys to the Kingdom: Live at the Village Vanguard (2023) |

Professional ratings
Review scores
| Source | Rating |
|---|---|
| DownBeat | 4/5 stars |
| Jazz Music Archives | 4.5/5 stars |
| JazzTrail | 4/5 stars |
| Jazzwise | 4/5 stars |
| The Times | 4/5 stars |

Sunrise Reprise is a 2021 studio album by saxophonist Chris Potter, his third released on Edition Records. For this album, Potter reunited with keyboardist James Francies and drummer Eric Harland from his 2019 studio album Circuits. It was the first album the three musicians recorded after a period of quarantine due to the COVID-19 pandemic.

== Track listing ==
All tracks are written by Chris Potter.

| No. | Title | Length |
|---|---|---|
| 1. | "Sunrise and Joshua Trees" | 5:41 |
| 2. | "Southbound" | 8:17 |
| 3. | "Serpentine" | 11:10 |
| 4. | "The Peanut" | 5:11 |
| 5. | "Nowhere, Now Here / Sunrise Reprise" | 24:27 |

== Personnel ==
Musicians

- Chris Potter – tenor saxophone, soprano saxophone, clarinet, flute, keyboards, producer
- James Francies – piano, keyboards
- Eric Harland – drums

Production

- Dave Stapleton – executive producer
- Louise Holland – executive producer
- Josh Giunta – recording
- Christopher Allen – mixing
- Huntley Miller – mastering
- Oli Bentley – artwork
- Dave Stapleton – photography
