= Surrender Dorothy (disambiguation) =

Surrender Dorothy is a famous special effect in the 1939 film The Wizard of Oz.

Surrender Dorothy may also refer to:

- Surrender Dorothy (1998 film), a 1998 film directed by Kevin DiNovis
- Surrender, Dorothy (2006), a TV film directed by Charles McDougall and starring Diane Keaton and Chris Pine
- "Surrender Dorothy" (Law & Order), an episode of Law & Order
- Surrender Dorothy (album), an album by Alana Davis
- Sleeper (band), formerly Surrender Dorothy, a 1990s Britpop band
- Surrenderdorothy, an alternative Indie/R&B duo made up of rapper Bones and producer Greaf
- Surrender, Dorothy, a 1998 novel by Meg Wolitzer
