= Fortune Cookie (disambiguation) =

A fortune cookie is a food item.

Fortune Cookie, Fortune Cookies, or The Fortune Cookie may also refer to:

- The Fortune Cookie, a 1966 film
- Fortune Cookies (album), a 2001 album by Alana Davis
- "Koi Suru Fortune Cookie", a 2013 song by Japanese group AKB48
- "The Fortune Cookie", an episode of the television series Mona the Vampire
- Fortune Cookie (novel), a 2010 novel by Bryce Courtenay
- "Fortune Cookie" (Shonen Knife song)
- "Fortune Cookie" (Emma Bale song)
