= Pathways (album) =

Live album by Dave Holland Octet
- Released: March 23, 2010
- Recorded: January 7–11, 2009
- Venue: Birdland; New York City
- Genre: Jazz; post-bop; hard bop
- Length: 75:24
- Label: Dare2
- Producer: Dave Holland

Dave Holland Octet chronology
Pass It On (2008)	Pathways (2010)	Hands (2010)

Pathways is a live album by the Dave Holland Octet. The album was recorded live at New York City’s Birdland jazz club. The record was released on March 23, 2010 via Dare2 label.

== Reception ==
Professional ratings
Review scores
Source	Rating
All About Jazz	3.5/5 stars
AllMusic	4/5 stars
Financial Times	4/5 stars
Tom Hull	B+
PopMatters	8/10

The AllMusic review by Jeff Tamarkin stated: "Holland uses those pieces, in particular, as launching pads for dynamic solo exhibits and inspired duets, but in the end it's not the dexterity of the individuals that impresses most, but rather the groupthink of the ensemble." George Varga writing for JazzTimes commented, "As Holland has done in virtually every one of his previous bands, he provides a platform for his Pathways colleagues to realize an individual and collective sense of purpose and cooperation. The resulting spirit of generosity, of selflessly yet emphatically serving each composition, pays off from start to finish on the seven-song album (five penned by Holland), which clocks in at over 75 minutes but doesn’t contain a single extraneous note or gesture. Miles and Mingus would be proud."

Earl J. Lundquist of Seattle Post-Intelligencer wrote "In his latest release, Pathways, bassist Dave Holland shapes his octet into a groove-heavy, blue-flame intensity with writing that is state-of-the-art hard bop... Recorded during a week-long stand at Birdland in New York City, the atmosphere combines with Holland’s writing and the virtuosity and inventiveness of the individual players to give this music the aesthetic thrust of classic Blue Note recordings. Dave Holland has created complex yet compelling and accessible arrangements, making Pathways a welcome addition to his discography."

== Track listing ==
All tracks are written by Dave Holland except as noted.

No.	Title	Writer(s)	Length
1.	"Pathways"		10:46
2.	"How's Never"		13:03
3.	"Sea of Marmara"	Chris Potter	9:03
4.	"Ebb and Flow"		10:48
5.	"Blue Jean"		7:28
6.	"Wind Dance"	Alex Sipiagin	9:10
7.	"Shadow Dance"		15:06
Total length:			1:15:24

== Personnel ==
- Antonio Hart – alto saxophone and flute
- Chris Potter – tenor saxophone and soprano saxophone
- Gary Smulyan – baritone saxophone
- Alex Sipiagin – trumpet
- Robin Eubanks – trombone
- Steve Nelson – marimba and vibraphone
- Dave Holland – double bass
- Nate Smith – drums
