= Song for Anyone =

Studio album by Chris Potter 10
- Released: 2007
- Recorded: August 2006
- Studio: Avatar, New York City
- Genre: Jazz
- Length: 72:54
- Label: Sunnyside; SCC 3074
- Producer: Dave Holland, Chris Potter

Chris Potter chronology
Underground (2006)	Song for Anyone (2007)	Follow the Red Line (2007)

Song for Anyone is an album by jazz saxophonist Chris Potter released on the Sunnyside label in 2007. It features Potter leading a ten-piece ensemble of woodwinds, reeds & strings in a presentation of ten of his original compositions. It was produced by Potter's former employer, bassist Dave Holland.

== Reception ==
Professional ratings
Review scores
Source	Rating
Allmusic	4.5/5 stars
PopMatters	8/10 stars
The Penguin Guide to Jazz Recordings	3/4 stars

The AllMusic review by Michael G. Nastos awarded the album 4 1/2 stars stating "A departure from Potter's small group efforts, this project is close to perfect, and considering his high-level output, may be the highlight of his discography. Everyone should hear Song for Anyone".

PopMatters correspondent Will Layman observed "The general tone of Music for Anyone is gentle, despite Potter's ability to heat things up on tenor ... Though there are ten musicians woven through these carefully arranged and episodic compositions, there is plenty of room in the middle for rays of light and breathing room".

== Track listing ==
All compositions by Chris Potter

1. "The Absence" − 7:36
2. "Against the Wind" − 7:58
3. "Closer to the Sun" − 8:08
4. "Family Tree" − 4:52
5. "Chief Seattle" − 9:44
6. "Cupid and Psyche" − 9:11
7. "Song for Anyone" − 8:57
8. "The Arc of a Day" − 4:00
9. "Estrellas del Sur" − 8:01
10. "All by All" − 4:45

== Personnel ==
- Chris Potter - tenor saxophone, soprano saxophone
- Erica von Kleist − flute
- Greg Tardy − clarinet
- Michael Rabinowitz − bassoon
- Mark Feldman − violin
- Lois Martin − viola
- David Eggar − cello
- Steve Cardenas − guitar
- Scott Colley − acoustic bass
- Adam Cruz - drums, percussion
