= Blame It on Me (album) =

Studio album by Alana Davis
- Released: September 23, 1997
- Recorded: 1997
- Genre: Pop
- Length: 62:34
- Label: Elektra
- Producer: Ed Tuton, Alana Davis

Alana Davis chronology
Blame It on Me (1997)	Fortune Cookies (2001)

Blame It on Me is the debut album by singer-songwriter Alana Davis. It was released in 1997 and contained her two most popular singles, "32 Flavors" and "Crazy". The album peaked at No. 157 on the U.S. Billboard 200.

== Critical reception ==
Professional ratings
Review scores
Source	Rating
AllMusic	4/5 stars
Entertainment Weekly	A−
Pitchfork	9.4/10

The Los Angeles Daily News wrote that Davis "synthesizes a bunch of soulful styles in the service of terrific material and equally refreshing arrangements."

== Track listing ==
All tracks are written by Alana Davis except as noted

No.	Title	Writer(s)	Length
1.	"32 Flavors" (cover of Ani DiFranco, 1995)	Ani DiFranco	3:45
2.	"Murder"		5:00
3.	"Love & Pride"	Davis, Ed Tuton	5:34
4.	"Turtle"	Davis, Tuton	5:19
5.	"One Day"		6:01
6.	"Crazy"	Davis, Tuton	5:04
7.	"Weight of the World"		6:07
8.	"Lullaby"	Davis, Tuton	5:25
9.	"Free"	Davis, Tuton	4:48
10.	"Round & Around"	Davis, Tuton	5:09
11.	"Rest of Yesterday"		5:11
12.	"Blame It on Me"		5:11
Total length:			62:34
