= Concentric Circles (Chris Potter album) =

Studio album by Chris Potter
- Released: 1994
- Recorded: December 1993
- Studio: Penny Lane Studios, New York City
- Genre: Jazz
- Length: 65:40
- Label: Concord
- Producer: Carl Jefferson

Chris Potter chronology
Presenting Chris Potter (1993)	Concentric Circles (1994)	Pure (1995)

Concentric Circles is the third album (but second released) by jazz saxophonist Chris Potter, recorded in 1993 and released by Concord in 1994. It features Potter with pianist Kenny Werner, electric guitarist John Handy, bassist Scott Colley and drummer Bill Stewart.

== Reception ==
Professional ratings
Review scores
Source	Rating
AllMusic	4.5/5 stars

The AllMusic review by Scott Yanow states "Only 23 at the time of this Concord CD, Chris Potter shows a great deal of originality in his explorative styles on alto and soprano ... All but two songs on this set are his originals and on some pieces Potter utilizes some overdubbing. Essentially a quintet session, this CD also contains some fine chance-taking solos from pianist Kenny Werner and guitarist John Hart, with the music ranging from modal to free bop".

== Track listing ==
All compositions by Chris Potter except where noted

1. "El Morocco" − 8:50
2. "Klee" − 5:43
3. "Blues in Concentric Circles" − 10:12
4. "Dusk" − 4:46
5. "Lonely Moon" − 7:02
6. "You and the Night and the Music" (Arthur Schwartz, Howard Dietz) − 7:15
7. "Mortal Coils" − 7:17
8. "In a Sentimental Mood" (Duke Ellington, Manny Kurtz, Irving Mills) − 8:40
9. "Aurora" − 5:55

== Personnel ==
- Chris Potter – tenor saxophone, alto saxophone, soprano saxophone, alto flute, bass clarinet
- Kenny Werner − piano
- John Hart − guitar
- Scott Colley − double bass
- Bill Stewart – drums
