= Imaginary Cities (album) =

Studio album by the Chris Potter Underground Orchestra
- Released: January 16, 2015
- Recorded: December 2013
- Studios: Avatar (New York, New York)
- Genre: Jazz
- Length: 71:09
- Label: ECM 2387
- Producer: Manfred Eicher

Chris Potter chronology
The Sirens (2013)	Imaginary Cities (2015)	The Dreamer Is the Dream (2017)

Imaginary Cities is a studio album by the Chris Potter Underground Orchestra recorded in December 2013 and released on ECM in January 2015, Potter's second album for the label. The ensembles features the return of his "Underground Quartet"—consisting rhythm section Craig Taborn, Adam Rogers, and Nate Smith—alongside vibraphonist Steve Nelson, bassist Scott Colley, bass guitarist Fima Ephron, and a string quartet.

== Reception ==
Professional ratings
Review scores
Source	Rating
All About Jazz	5/5 stars
All About Jazz	5/5 stars
Allmusic	4.5/5 stars
The Buffalo News	4/5 stars
Blurt	4/5 stars
Financial Times	5/5 stars
The Guardian	3/5 stars
Irish Times	4/5 stars

The AllMusic review by Thom Jurek awarded the album 4 1/2 stars stating "Potter's writing on Imaginary Cities engages every aspect of his jazz palette. It embraces modern classical music as part of a striking whole. It is his most ambitious project to date, and arguably his most expertly articulated."

The Guardian's John Fordham noted, "This feels like a work in progress with a fascinating future."

Jeff Simon writing for The Buffalo News commented, "The result is utterly spectacular, I think. It’s a disc that it is completely fresh and idiomatically only itself, with great solos all through it, not least of all by Potter on tenor and soprano saxophone and bass clarinet."

All About Jazz correspondent John Kelman observed "with Imaginary Cities Potter has created the first real masterpiece of 2015. A profound paradigm shift for the saxophonist, Imaginary Cities suggests that the end point of Potter's potential seems still very far beyond the horizon." Another review by Karl Ackermann stated "Imaginary Cities is an expansive album expressing divergent motifs linked together through a central theme. The septet is taut and adventurous; the strings impassioned and thoughtful and Potter's playing is his best to date. Though he emerged as a leader two decades back seemingly fully-formed in every creative aspect, he continues to evolve and surprise. Imaginary Cities is a superb album on every level."

== Track listing ==
All compositions by Chris Potter

1. "Lament" − 8:07
2. "Imaginary Cities 1: Compassion" − 8:34
3. "Imaginary Cities 2: Dualities" − 8:44
4. "Imaginary Cities 3: Disintegration" − 7:23
5. "Imaginary Cities 4: Rebuilding" − 11:33
6. "Firefly" − 8:37
7. "Shadow Self" − 6:09
8. "Sky" − 12:02

== Personnel ==
- Chris Potter – soprano saxophone, tenor saxophone, bass clarinet
- Adam Rogers − guitars
- Craig Taborn − piano
- Steve Nelson − vibraphone, marimba
- Fima Ephron − bass guitar
- Scott Colley − double bass
- Nate Smith – drums
- Mark Feldman, Joyce Hammann − violin
- Lois Martin − viola
- Dave Eggar − cello
