= Sundiata (album) =

Studio album by Chris Potter Quartet
- Released: 1995
- Recorded: December 13, 1993
- Studio: RPM Studios, New York City
- Genre: Jazz
- Length: 62:34
- Label: Criss Cross Jazz
- Producer: Gerry Teekens

Chris Potter chronology
Pure (1995)	Sundiata (1995)	Moving In (1996)

Sundiata is the second album (but fourth released) by jazz saxophonist Chris Potter. It was recorded on December 13, 1993, but not released by the Criss Cross Jazz label until 1995. It features Potter in a quartet with pianist Kevin Hays, bassist Doug Weiss and veteran drummer Al Foster.

== Reception ==
Professional ratings
Review scores
Source	Rating
AllMusic	4/5 stars
The Penguin Guide to Jazz Recordings	3.5/4 stars

The AllMusic review by David R. Adler states "Sundiata ranks as one of Potter's finest efforts ... Sundiata is an early sign of Chris Potter's importance in the jazz world".

== Track listing ==
All compositions by Chris Potter except where noted

1. "Fear of Flying" – 8:45
2. "Hibiscus" – 7:39
3. "Airegin" (Sonny Rollins) – 7:40
4. "New Lullaby" – 6:52
5. "Sundiata" – 8:16
6. "Body and Soul" (Johnny Green, Frank Eyton, Edward Heyman, Robert Sour) – 8:00
7. "Leap of Faith" – 9:36
8. "C.P.'s Blues" – 5:42

== Personnel ==
- Chris Potter – tenor saxophone, alto saxophone, soprano saxophone
- Kevin Hays − piano
- Doug Weiss − bass
- Al Foster – drums
