= 32 Flavors =

1995 song by Ani DiFranco

Song by Ani DiFranco

from the album Not a Pretty Girl
- Released: July 18, 1995
- Genre: Pop
- Length: 6:07
- Label: Righteous Babe
- Songwriter: Ani DiFranco
- Producer: Ani DiFranco

"32 Flavors" is a song written and performed by Ani DiFranco. This song appears on her sixth studio album Not a Pretty Girl, released in 1995. A variation of the song is featured on the movie soundtrack of the 1999 Canadian romantic comedy Better Than Chocolate.

The song was later covered by Alana Davis as her 1997 debut single. The song was used in an ad campaign by the National Football League in 1999. The ad featured a number of players who have worn the number "32" on their jerseys.

The title of the song is a play on Canton, Massachusetts-based ice cream store Baskin-Robbins and its well-known "31 flavors" slogan.

== Alana Davis version ==
"32 Flavors"

Single by Alana Davis

from the album Blame It on Me
- B-side: "Lullaby"
- Released: November 18, 1997
- Genre: Pop
- Length: 3:45
- Label: Elektra
- Songwriter: Ani DiFranco
- Producer: Alana Davis

Alana Davis singles chronology
"32 Flavors" (1997)	"Crazy" (1998)

Audio sample
- file; help

A cover version of "32 Flavors" was released as the first single by Manhattan-based singer Alana Davis. The song appears on her debut album Blame It on Me. The CD single also included Davis' song "Lullaby". It received a 3 out of 5 star rating on Allmusic. "32 Flavors" was successful, peaking at number 37 on Hot 100 chart in Billboard magazine, Davis' sole Hot 100 charting.

When Davis submitted her first album, completed as she intended it, to Elektra Records she recalls the reaction as being: "Uh - great album, Alana: where's the single?" It was Elektra A&R representative Josh Deutsch who suggested Davis record "32 Flavors" to serve as the album's first single. Davis, although was pleased with the finished result, was uncomfortable with covering the song as she felt she could not connect with all of the personal emotions expressed in DiFranco's lyrics: Davis told MTV News, "Ani DiFranco is very much her own song writer .... I think of her songs as being very specific to her ideals and stuff. At first I wasn't sure about taking her ideas and trying to make them my own and reinterpreting them. But I started to play around with [the song] .... I took out the parts that I wasn't comfortable with ... and I put in ideas of my own and sent her a copy of it and she said she loved it ...." DiFranco has stated that she initially found Davis' lyrical adjustments "hard to swallow" but does not fault Davis, adding she feels "pretty unprotective" about her compositions: "The 'songs as children' analogy works for me, in that you have to learn to let them go."

In 2005 Davis stated: "I wrote parts of that song [as Davis recorded it] I never took credit for .... The chorus, for example ... did not exist in the original recording. Though that song is technically a cover, I put myself and my lyrics and my musical sensibility in it as I do with any cover. I wrote the bassline and programmed the drums. And so, when I perform that song, or when you listen to the album version, you are listening to a hybrid of the original. I don’t think you can hear my version and feel like you are listening to Ani's song anymore. You have to listen to her recording to get her vibe. Mine is a different animal".

=== Track listing ===
1. "32 Flavors"
2. "Lullaby"

=== Charts ===
Charts	Peak position
U.S. Billboard Hot 100	37
U.S. Billboard Adult Top 40	17
U.S. Billboard Top 40 Mainstream	34

== Other versions ==
British acid-jazz band D'Influence remade the song for their 2002 album D'Influence Presents D-Vas: the track "32 Flavours" (reflecting British preferred spelling) featured as guest vocalist Louise Rose. "32 Flavors" has since been remade by Elle Varner for her 2012 mixtape Conversational Lush and Dianne Reeves for her 2014 album Beautiful Life. Reeves describes "32 Flavors" as being "about people doing amazing things that nobody sees. It speaks to how we should be more conscious about those around us — those who populate and contribute to our lives": Before recording the song Reeves had been performing "32 Flavors" live for some time - (quote) "I always improvised a melody around it [when] I did it ...on stage...My band never knew how I was going to call it. We would create something on stage and do it. And it was the power of the lyric, you know, that allowed me to do that and to make it something different every night. And then I said, I want to record this."

== In popular culture ==
In the song "You're My Flavor" by Lenny Kravitz on his album 5, at minute 3:08 a reference to Ani DiFranco's song is audible. Lenny says "All 32, baby".
