= Critical Mass (Dave Holland album) =

Studio album by the Dave Holland Quintet
- Released: August 29, 2006
- Recorded: December 2005
- Studio: Avatar, New York City
- Genre: Jazz; post-bop
- Length: 1:12:50
- Label: Dare2/Sunnyside
- Producer: Dave Holland

The Dave Holland Quintet chronology
Overtime (2005)	Critical Mass (2006)	Pass It On (2008)

Professional ratings
Review scores
Source	Rating
Allmusic	3.5/5 stars
All About Jazz	4.5/5 stars
The Guardian	4/5 stars
The Inlander	4/5 stars
Jazzwise	4/5 stars
The Penguin Guide to Jazz Recordings	3.5/4 stars
PopMatters	8/10
Tom Hull	B+

Critical Mass is a studio album by the Dave Holland Quintet released in 2006 through Dare2, his second release for his own label. This is Holland's first recording to feature the quintet of drummer Nate Smith, saxophonist Chris Potter, trombonist Robin Eubanks and vibraphonist Steve Nelson, all returning from previous Holland projects.

== Reception ==
Steve Greenlee of JazzTimes stated "It’s been five years since Dave Holland’s quintet released an album of new material. The bassist hasn’t exactly been relaxing in the meantime; he put out two albums of big-band music and toured extensively, and released a stellar double-live CD by his quintet. And all the while, the least grateful among us have been hankering for some new music from Holland’s quintet. Well, here it is, and it holds its own against Prime Directive, the group’s most impressive release... The groupthink mentality manifests itself most obviously on the New Orleans tribute “Easy Did It,” for which Holland and Smith create a slithering, swelling rhythm that culminates in a five-way roundtable of near-chaos. Critical Mass will be on everyone’s list of 2006’s best." John Kelman of All About Jazz wrote, "Proof that it's possible to retain one's identity while breaking new ground, Critical Mass continues a streak of winning records for Holland that shows no sign of letting up." John Fordham of The Guardian added, " It's unflinching contemporary instrumental jazz, but as subtly melodic as Holland's bands always are."

== Track listing ==
All tracks are written by Dave Holland except as noted.

No.	Title	Writer(s)	Length
1.	"The Eyes Have It"		7:00
2.	"Easy Did It"		11:16
3.	"Vicissitudes"	Chris Potter	9:56
4.	"The Leak"	Nate Smith	5:42
5.	"Secret Garden"		8:42
6.	"Lucky Seven"		8:35
7.	"Full Circle"	Robin Eubanks	12:11
8.	"Amator Silenti"	Steve Nelson	9:17
Total length:			1:12:50

== Personnel ==
- Chris Potter – tenor & soprano saxophones
- Robin Eubanks – trombone
- Steve Nelson – vibraphone, marimba & tambourine
- Dave Holland – double bass
- Nate Smith – drums
