= Pure (Chris Potter album) =

Studio album by Chris Potter
- Released: 1995
- Recorded: 1994
- Studio: New York City
- Genre: Jazz
- Length: 59:42
- Label: Concord Jazz
- Producer: Carl Jefferson

Chris Potter chronology
Concentric Circles (1994)	Pure (1995)	Sundiata (1995)

Professional ratings
Review scores
Source	Rating
Allmusic	3/5 stars

Pure is the fourth album (but third released) by jazz saxophonist Chris Potter, recorded in 1994 and released in 1995 by the Concord Jazz label. Appearing on the album is Potter’s frequent collaborator, guitarist John Hart. Also appearing are organist/pianist Larry Goldings, bassist Larry Grenadier and veteran drummer Al Foster. According to praise from Neil Tesser in 1998, Goldings plays with "virtually none of the traditional organ-jazz fare" on this album.

== Track listing ==
All compositions by Chris Potter except where noted.

1. Salome's Dance - 6:37
2. Checking Out - 3:58
3. Resonance - 3:46
4. Bad Guys - 6:40
5. Boogie Stop Shuffle (Charles Mingus) - 3:22
6. Second Thoughts - 5:47
7. That's What I Said - 6:40
8. The Fool on the Hill (John Lennon, Paul McCartney) - 4:25
9. Bonnie Rose (Al Foster) - 4:37
10. You'd Be So Easy to Love (Cole Porter) - 6:10
11. The Distant Present - 4:45
12. Ev'ry Time We Say Goodbye (Cole Porter) - 2:55

== Personnel ==
- Chris Potter – bass clarinet, alto flute, alto saxophone, soprano saxophone, tenor saxophone
- Larry Goldings – organ, piano
- John Hart – guitar
- Larry Grenadier – upright bass
- Al Foster – drums
