= Transatlantic (album) =

Studio album by Chris Potter and the DR Big Band
- Released: 2011
- Recorded: January 2010
- Studio: DR Byen Studio 3, Copenhagen, Denmark
- Genre: Jazz
- Length: 66:54
- Label: Red Dot Music; RDM013
- Producer: Chris Minh Doky

Chris Potter chronology
| Ultrahang (2009) | Transatlantic (2011) | The Sirens (2013) |

Transatlantic is an album by jazz saxophonist Chris Potter with the 18 piece Danish Radio Big Band (“DR Big Band”) recorded in January 2010, and released in 2011 on the Red Dot Music label.

== Reception ==
Professional ratings
Review scores
| Source | Rating |
|---|---|
| Allmusic | 4/5 stars |
| All About Jazz | 4.5/5 stars |

The Allmusic review by Ken Dryden awarded the album 4 stars stating "Chris Potter has long established himself as one of the top saxophonists of his generation, but these 2010 sessions with the DR Big Band find him breaking new ground, writing original material for a large ensemble while conducting and serving as the primary soloist as well ... Fans of Chris Potter who are used to hearing him lead various small groups will have their ears opened by this outstanding progressive release".

All About Jazz correspondent John Kelman observed "Transatlantic may wax heavy on the solo front, but it's always in service of Potter's detailed charts, which demonstrate continued growth as a writer/arranger. He may largely work in small group contexts, but Transatlantic proves Potter's increasing mettle as a leader in any context, as compelling for its long-form charts as it is its ever-perfect capacity to inspire expansive but always completely relevant improvisation".

== Track listing ==
All compositions by Chris Potter

1. "Quick" − 9:44
2. "The Steppes" − 9:20
3. "Interlude" − 1:30
4. "New Year's Day" − 9:25
5. "Narrow Road" − 6:27
6. "Abyssinia" − 9:52
7. "Totally" − 9:08
8. "Rumination" − 11:48

== Personnel ==
- Chris Potter - arranger, conductor, saxophone
- Anders Gustafsson, Christer Gustafsson, Gerard Presencer, Mads la Cour, Thomas Kjærgaard − trumpet
- Jakob Munck, Peter Jensen, Steen Hansen, Vincent Nilsson − trombone
- Lars Møller, Nicolai Schultz, Pelle Fridell, Peter Fuglsang, Uffe Markussen − reeds
- Magnus Hjort − piano
- Kaspar Vadsholt − double bass
- Søren Frost - drums
- Per Gade − guitar
