= Sarah Jane Cion =

American jazz musician

Sarah Jane Cion is an American author and jazz pianist.

== Music career ==
Sarah Jane Cion received the Boston Jazz Society Award in 1988. She graduated from the New England Conservatory in 1990. In 1991, she was chosen as one of four pianists to attend the Banff School of Fine Arts, with faculty of Steve Coleman, Rufus Reid, Kevin Eubanks, Marvin Smith, Kenny Wheeler and Dave Holland.

In July 1996, she worked with Monty Alexander in his jazz workshop in Verbier, Switzerland. She won the 17th Annual Great American Jazz Piano Competition held in Jacksonville, in 1999. She appeared on the NPR radio Piano Jazz with Marian McPartland.

The Sarah Jane Cion Trio was the opening act for the George Coleman Quartet at the Mellon Jazz Festival in Pittsburgh. The Trio was presented in concert by Savannah On Stage in March 2001, and at the Smithsonian Institution-Voice of America Stage in Washington D.C. in May 2001. A request festival performer, Cion also played in the Kennedy Center Mary Lou Williams Jazz Festival, The Minnesota Jazz Festival, WJCT Jacksonville and the Indy Jazz Fest.

Cion's recordings highlighting her original compositions include Summer Night, featuring saxophonist Michael Brecker (#12 on the Yellowdog jazz chart), Moon Song, among the top selling modern jazz albums in Japan (2000) with Chris Potter, and Indeed! with Antonio Hart.

She has performed and recorded with many other artists including Clark Terry, Etta Jones, Anita O'Day, Della Griffin, Carmen Leggio, Gerry Niewood, Bucky Pizzarelli, Dr. Lyn Christie, Don Braden, James McBride and the BMI Jazz Orchestra among many others. Cion performs in the major jazz venues of the United States. She has brought her magic to New York's Blue Note, Iridium, Birdland, Mezzrow, and New Hersey's Trumpets, Cecil's, The Cornerstone, and Ceceres. Cion's book Modern Jazz Piano (published by Hal Leonard) is the standard theory manual at Princeton University.

Her music has appeared on ABC's long-running daytime soap, All My Children, and her original composition "Golden Song" appeared in the movie Thor: The Dark World, as well as "Cat in the Hat" in Clint Eastwood's 2019 The Mule. She has toured Israel, Portugal, Japan, Germany, Austria and England.

== Discography ==
Year recorded	Title	Label	Notes
1999?	Indeed!	Consolidated Artists	with Antonio Hart and Tony Reedus
1999	Moon Song	Naxos	Most tracks trio, with Phil Palombi (bass), Billy Hart (drums); two tracks quartet, with Chris Potter (tenor sax) added
2000	Summer Night	Naxos	Most tracks trio, with Phil Palombi (bass), Billy Hart (drums); two tracks quartet, with Michael Brecker (tenor sax) added
2004?	Lara's Lullabies	CAP	

== Books ==
Sarah Jane Cion has authored or contributed to the following music-related works:

- Sarah Cion (4 June 2012). Lara's Lullabies: Studies for the Intermediate/Advanced Book and Recording Set. CreateSpace. ISBN 978-1-4752-8056-2.
- A Baker’s Dozen: 13 Contemporary Jazz Etudes: Studies and Etudes for the Intermediate/Advanced
- The Pianist's Jammin’ Handbook!
- Steinway Library Of Piano Music: Jazz Piano — Pieces To Grow On (2006)
- Cion, Sarah Jane (2005). Modern Jazz Piano: An Intermediate Guide to Jazz Concepts, Improvisation, Technique and Theory. Milwaukee, Wisconsin: Hal Leonard Corporation. ISBN 978-0-634-08366-2. OCLC 60456540.
