= The Sirens (Chris Potter album) =

Studio album by Chris Potter
- Released: January 28, 2013
- Recorded: September 2011
- Studios: Avatar (New York, New York)
- Genre: Jazz
- Length: 63:36
- Labels: ECM; ECM 2258
- Producer: Manfred Eicher

Chris Potter chronology
Transatlantic (2011)	The Sirens (2013)	Imaginary Cities (2015)

The Sirens is a 2013 studio album by jazz saxophonist Chris Potter, recorded in September 2011 and released on ECM in January 2013, his first venture for the label. It features Potter with longtime collaborators, pianist Craig Taborn and bassist Larry Grenadier, along with keyboardist David Virelles and drummer Eric Harland.

== Reception ==
Professional ratings
Aggregate scores
Source	Rating
Metacritic	76/100
Review scores
Source	Rating
Allmusic	4/5 stars
The Guardian	3/5 stars
All About Jazz	5/5 stars
All About Jazz	4.5/5 stars

The AllMusic review by Thom Jurek awarded the album 4 stars stating "Potter's vision and compositions on The Sirens never lose sight of his goal: portraying the eternal essence of humanity in the mythos of his subject; his poetic lyricism as a soloist, and his empathy as a bandleader are consummate."

The Guardian's John Fordham noted "Only the faintly niggling sensation of this being a classically authoritative Potter jazz set with some suitable concept-exotica embroidery blunts The Sirens' impact."

All About Jazz correspondent John Kelman observed "Through it all, there's no mistaking this for anything but a Chris Potter record, but with The Sirens he's delivered one unlike any he's done before. An eclectic album that couldn't have happened without what's come before, it's nevertheless a signpost of significant change, as the saxophonist opens himself up compositionally—and, from a performance perspective, one that, if he can keep this remarkable group together, promises even better things to come." Another review by Ian Patterson stated "The Sirens will go down as one of Potter's best, but this is assuredly a collective triumph."

== Track listing ==
All compositions by Chris Potter except as indicated

1. "Wine Dark Sea" - 8:47
2. "Wayfinder" - 6:49
3. "Dawn (With Her Rosy Fingers)" - 7:23
4. "The Sirens" - 8:38
5. "Penelope" - 7:14
6. "Kalypso" - 8:24
7. "Nausikaa" - 5:40
8. "Stranger at the Gate" - 8:12
9. "The Shades" (Potter, David Virelles) - 2:11

== Personnel ==
- Chris Potter – soprano saxophone, tenor saxophone, bass clarinet
- Craig Taborn – piano
- David Virelles – prepared piano, celesta, harmonium
- Larry Grenadier – double bass
- Eric Harland – drums
