= Pass It On (Dave Holland album) =

Studio album by the Dave Holland Sextet
- Released: September 23, 2008
- Recorded: August 2007
- Studios: Avatar (New York, New York)
- Genres: Jazz; post-bop; hard bop
- Length: 74:16
- Label: Dare2/EmArcy
- Producer: Dave Holland

The Dave Holland Sextet chronology
Critical Mass (2006)	Pass It On (2008)	Pathways (2010)

Professional ratings
Review scores
Source	Rating
Allmusic	4/5 stars
All About Jazz	3.5/5 stars
The Guardian	4/5 stars
Jazzwise	4/5 stars
Le Devoir	3/5 stars
Tom Hull	B+

Pass It On is a 2008 album by the Dave Holland Sextet. Long-standing Holland trombonist Robin Eubanks returns, joined by alto saxophonist Antonio Hart and trumpeter Alex Sipiagin from the Holland Big Band. Rounding out the group are the all-star rhythm section of pianist Mulgrew Miller and drummer Eric Harland.

== Critical reception ==
An AllMusic review by Michael G. Nastros awarded the album 4 stars, stating, "Using a sextet, upright bassist Holland sets the bar even higher, adding the always tasteful pianist Mulgrew Miller and a four-horn front line that is relentless. This group continues to define jazz perfectly in the 21st century."

Josef Woodard of JazzTimes wrote "Given the power and familiarity of Dave Holland’s longstanding sextet and the quintet before that, going back to the early ’80s, one point of surprise with his new band and recording is a fundamental change: the presence of piano. Mulgrew Miller does the keyboard honors, and along with the three-horn frontline, he makes the band sound, on first impression at least, like Holland’s most “traditional” band in decades... One of the more exciting aspects of this project, in fact, is the sense of continuity in hearing Holland dipping into his past songbook and applying new textural/ensemble garb. To hear, for example, Holland’s wakeup-call neo-hard-bop tune “Double Vision”-originally from the great 1984 chordless quintet album Seeds of Time-in this new, horns-and-piano thickened format, is to recognize the sweep and significance of the man’s work and musical thinking over the decades. In Holland’s case, the seeds of time keep reaping."

Mark Corroto, writing for All About Jazz, says that sextet "plays music much like a very small big band."

== Track listing ==
All tracks are written by Dave Holland except as noted.

No.	Title	Writer(s)	Length
1.	"The Sum of All Parts"	Robin Eubanks	8:11
2.	"Fast Track"		6:30
3.	"Lazy Snake"		10:07
4.	"Double Vision"		8:07
5.	"Equality"		9:09
6.	"Modern Times"		5:58
7.	"Rivers Run"		13:45
8.	"Processional"		4:33
9.	"Pass It On"		7:56
Total length:			74:16

== Personnel ==
- Antonio Hart – alto saxophone, flute
- Alex Sipiagin – trumpet
- Robin Eubanks – trombone
- Mulgrew Miller – piano
- Dave Holland – double bass
- Eric Harland – drums
