= Eagle's Point =

Studio album by Chris Potter
- Released: March 8, 2024
- Recorded: 2022
- Studio: The Bunker Studio
- Genre: Jazz
- Label: Edition
- Producer: Chris Potter

Eagle's Point is an album by Chris Potter. It was recorded in 2022 and released in 2024 by Edition Records.

== Music and recording ==
Saxophonist and bass clarinetist Potter, pianist Brad Mehldau, bassist John Patitucci, and drummer Brian Blade had known each since the 1990s but had never recorded together before this album, which was laid down at The Bunker Studio in 2022.

Potter wrote all of the eight tracks and was also the album producer. He plays tenor saxophone throughout, except for bass clarinet for the first half of "Indigo Ildikó" and soprano saxophone on "Aria for Anna".

== Release and reception ==
Professional ratings
Review scores
Source	Rating
DownBeat	4/5 stars
Financial Times	4/5 stars
Jazzwise	4/5 stars

Eagle's Point was released by Edition Records on March 8, 2024. The Financial Times reviewer described it as "an album of beautifully poised modern jazz, laden with the strength of character and rhythmic interplay to balance Potter's advanced technique." Referencing the reputation of the band members, Jazz Journal concluded that "'Supergroup' may be an overworked expression, but it would be difficult to deny this is super playing" and Jazzwise wrote "For this most unassuming of supergroups, it's never about anything else other than the music."

== Track listing ==
1. "Dream of Home" – 5:39
2. "Cloud Message" – 7:05
3. "Indigo Ildikó" – 7:18
4. "Eagle's Point" – 7:35
5. "Aria for Anna" – 6:15
6. "Other Plans" – 7:40
7. "Málaga Moon" – 8:28
8. "Horizon Dance" – 6:39

== Personnel ==
- Chris Potter – tenor sax, soprano sax, bass clarinet
- Brad Mehldau – piano
- John Patitucci – bass
- Brian Blade – drums
