= Curtis Macdonald =

Canadian-American composer, sound designer, and saxophonist

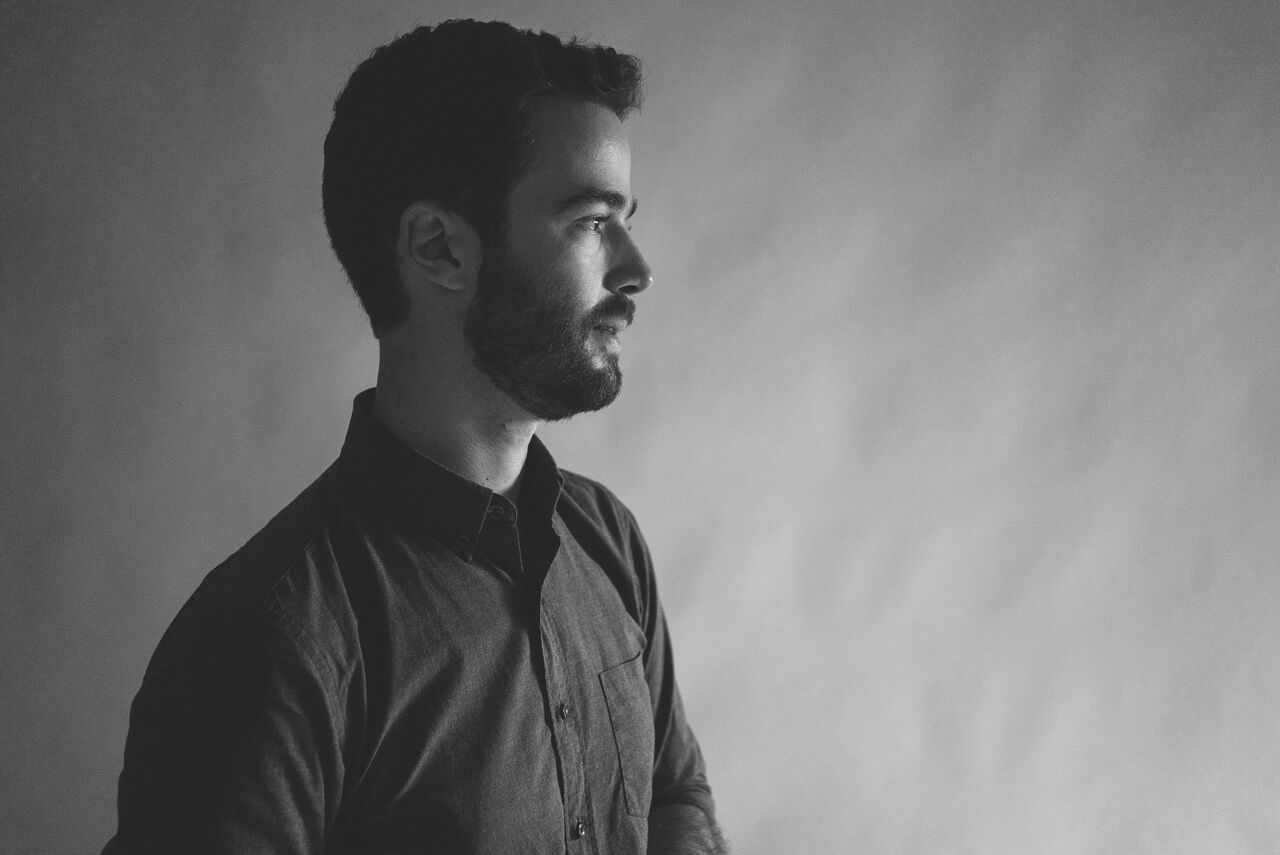

Background information
- Also known as: Curtis R. Macdonald
- Born: Curtis Robert Macdonald; 1985 (age 40–41); Calgary, Alberta, Canada
- Origin: New York City, New York, U.S.
- Genres: Avant-garde jazz; Incidental music; Contemporary classical music
- Occupations: Composer; Sound designer; Saxophonist; Producer
- Instruments: Alto saxophone; Saxophone
- Years active: 2007–present
- Label: Greenleaf Music
- Website: curtismacdonald.com

Curtis Macdonald (also known as Curtis Robert Macdonald; born 1985) is a Canadian-American composer, sound designer, and saxophonist. He has written original scores for contemporary dance companies including Alvin Ailey American Dance Theater, Aszure Barton, Kate Weare Company, and Hubbard Street Dance Chicago, and has worked for Audible. He co-produced the music podcast Meet the Composer, which received a Peabody Award in 2015.

== Early life and education ==
Macdonald was born in 1985 in Calgary, Alberta, and moved to New York City in 2003.

== Career ==
=== Composition ===
Macdonald has composed scores for contemporary dance, including works for Aszure Barton & Artists, Alvin Ailey American Dance Theater, Kate Weare Company, and Hubbard Street Dance Chicago, among others. He draws on a background in sound design as part of his compositional approach.

In 2016 Macdonald appeared as a soloist on Pulitzer Prize winner Henry Threadgill's Old Locks and Irregular Verbs, an album in tribute to Lawrence D. "Butch" Morris released on Pi Recordings; the album was voted best jazz album of 2016 in both the NPR and JazzTimes Critics Polls. He continued with Threadgill's ensembles on Dirt… And More Dirt (2018), recorded with the 15-piece 14 or 15 Kestra: Agg, and Double Up, Plays Double Up Plus (2018), an expansion of Ensemble Double Up to three concert grand pianos.

=== Saxophone and recordings ===
Macdonald's principal instrument is the alto saxophone. His debut album, Community Immunity, was released on Greenleaf Music in 2011. He followed it with Twice Through the Wall (2013) and Scotobiology (2016). In 2013 he authored Introducing Extended Saxophone Techniques, published by Mel Bay.

=== Sound design and production ===
Since 2020, Macdonald has been at Audible, where he contributes to Audible Originals including The Sesame Street Podcast with Foley & Friends (in collaboration with Sesame Workshop) and Letters from Camp (in collaboration with Comet Pictures). These productions have received recognition from the Banff World Media Festival, the Webby Awards, and the Telly Awards.

As a producer he was part of the team behind the music podcast Meet the Composer, produced for WQXR; the program received a Peabody Award in 2015 and was hosted by violist Nadia Sirota. He was also Technical Director of The Open Ears Project from WNYC Studios, hosted by Clemency Burton-Hill, a Webby Award Honoree for Best Podcast Series and Webby Nominee for Best Music Podcast in the 24th Annual Webby Awards (2020).

=== Teaching ===
Macdonald previously served on faculty at The New School, including The New School for Jazz.

== Awards ==
- 2024 — Rockie Award, Best Podcast: Fiction, Banff World Media Festival, for The Sesame Street Podcast with Foley & Friends (Season 3).
- 2023 — Telly Award (Bronze), General Promotional Video, for Letters from Camp (Season 3 promo trailer).
- 2023 — Webby Award Honoree, Video Media & Entertainment (Branded), for Letters from Camp (Season 3 sneak peek).
- 2022 — Webby Award Honoree, Best Family & Kids Podcast Series, for Letters from Camp (Season 2).
- 2020 — Webby Award Honoree, Best Podcast Series, for The Open Ears Project.
- 2020 — Webby Award Nominee, Best Music Podcast, for The Open Ears Project.
- 2015 — Peabody Award, for Meet the Composer.

== Discography ==
=== As leader ===
- 2011 — Community Immunity (Greenleaf Music)
- 2013 — Twice Through the Wall
- 2016 — Scotobiology

=== As sideman ===
With Henry Threadgill:

- 2016 — Old Locks and Irregular Verbs (Pi Recordings PI64), Ensemble Double Up
- 2018 — Dirt… And More Dirt (Pi Recordings PI73), 14 or 15 Kestra: Agg
- 2018 — Double Up, Plays Double Up Plus (Pi Recordings PI75), Ensemble Double Up

== Bibliography ==
- Introducing Extended Saxophone Techniques (Mel Bay, 2013).
