= Unspoken (Chris Potter album) =

Studio album by Chris Potter
- Released: 1997
- Recorded: May 21–23, 1997
- Studio: Make Believe Ballroom, West Shokan, New York
- Genre: Jazz
- Length: 65:01
- Label: Concord Jazz
- Producer: John Burk, Allen Farnham

Chris Potter chronology
Concord Duo Series Volume Ten (1996)	Unspoken (1997)	Vertigo (1998)

Unspoken is the sixth studio album by jazz saxophonist Chris Potter, released in 1997 by Concord Jazz. It features Potter in a quartet with guitarist John Scofield, bassist Dave Holland and drummer Jack DeJohnette.

== Reception ==
Professional ratings
Review scores
Source	Rating
Allmusic	4.5/5 stars
The Penguin Guide to Jazz Recordings	3.5/4 stars

Leo Stanley's AllMusic review awarded the album 4 1/2 stars, stating that "Chris Potter recorded his most adventurous record to date with Unspoken. Although his powerhouse rhythm section sometimes overwhelms him, Potter flexes more creative muscle throughout Unspoken, resulting in an engaging, frequently provocative listen".

All About Jazz correspondent Robert Spencer observed that "Unspoken is a solid album from start to finish. The sidemen are top-notch throughout, and the leader doesn't disappoint."

In JazzTimes, Bill Milkowski wrote that "on his latest for Concord, Unspoken, Potter leaps to another level. Different influences are beginning to creep into both his playing and writing on this superb outing. There's a looseness and a spirit of adventure that one did not necessarily encounter in his earlier efforts".

== Track listing ==
All compositions by Chris Potter

1. "Wistful" – 7:45
2. "Seven Eleven" – 9:08
3. "Hieroglyph" – 6:00
4. "Amsterdam Blues" – 7:50
5. "Et Tu, Bruté?" – 7:12
6. "Unspoken" – 5:41
7. "No Cigar" – 5:18
8. "Time Zone" – 8:55
9. "New Vision" – 7:11

== Personnel ==
- Chris Potter – tenor saxophone, soprano saxophone
- John Scofield − guitar
- Dave Holland − bass
- Jack DeJohnette – drums
