= The Dreamer Is the Dream =

Studio album by Chris Potter
- Released: April 21, 2017
- Recorded: June 2016
- Studio: Avatar (New York, New York)
- Genre: Jazz
- Length: 50:02
- Label: ECM; ECM 2519
- Producer: Manfred Eicher

Chris Potter chronology
Imaginary Cities (2015)	The Dreamer Is the Dream (2017)	Circuits (2019)

The Dreamer Is the Dream is a studio album by jazz saxophonist Chris Potter recorded in June 2016 and released the following year in April on ECM —his third release for the label. Potter's quartet on the album features David Virelles, Joe Martin and Marcus Gilmore.

The album was critically well received.

== Reception ==
Professional ratings
Review scores
Source	Rating
All About Jazz	4/5 stars
All About Jazz	4.5/5 stars
Allmusic	4/5 stars
Blurt	4/5 stars
Elmore	82/100
The Guardian	4/5 stars
RTÉ	4/5 stars
The Times	3/5 stars

The AllMusic review by Thom Jurek awarded the album 4 stars stating, "The Dreamer Is the Dream is impressive for all the right reasons. Potter's tunes are all top flight, for one. He appears to have written them for the considerable strength of this band and he makes no attempt to ride herd over them. For their part, the players' intuitive engagement with him and one another is dictated by a collective willingness to let the music do the primary talking and respond in kind. This is yet another strong outing for Potter."

The Guardian's John Fordham noted "there’s a new creative tension within the quartet for his third ECM album as leader, perhaps because there seem to be two key partnerships complementing and challenging each other within it: Potter’s with longtime bass sidekick Joe Martin, and Cuban-American pianist David Virelles’ edgier, contemporary one with drummer Marcus Gilmore."

Mike Jurkovic of Elmore Magazine wrote, "On his third ECM release, Chris Potter forays further into the creative well of himself and his sax..."

All About Jazz correspondent Karl Ackermann observed "The Dreamer Is the Dream is a testament to Potter's composing as much as to his multi-reed instrumentality. He penned each of the compositions here and they all speak to a deeper sense of mortality, portrayed through lyricism and emotive performances. Potter's responsiveness as a leader shines through in the beautifully orchestrated work of this quartet. One of Potter's best to date". In another review for the same website, Mark Sullivan noted "In short, while this is the most conventional of Potter's ECM albums, it's still a kaleidoscopic affair, full of contrasting moods and tonal colors. It's a splendid showcase for the leader's composing and playing, but still offers plenty of space for the other band members. Here's hoping we hear more from them."

RTÉ reviewer Paddy Kehoe called it "a rich, yet curiously elusive album" stating "Tenor and soprano sax visionary Chris Potter has produced a richly poised, seductive album in The Dreamer is the Dream, on which the American musician shines."

== Track listing ==
All compositions by Chris Potter

1. "Heart in Hand" − 8:19
2. "Ilimba" − 9:52
3. "The Dreamer Is the Dream" − 8:18
4. "Memory and Desire" − 7:52
5. "Yasodhara" − 10:07
6. "Sonic Anomaly" − 5:34

== Personnel ==
- Chris Potter – soprano saxophone, tenor saxophone, bass clarinet, flute, Ilimba, samples
- David Virelles – piano, celeste
- Joe Martin – double bass
- Marcus Gilmore – drums, percussion
