= Presenting Chris Potter =

Studio album by Chris Potter Quintet
- Released: 1993
- Recorded: December 29, 1992
- Studio: RPM Studios, New York City
- Genre: Jazz
- Length: 65:29
- Label: Criss Cross Jazz
- Producer: Gerry Teekens

Chris Potter chronology
Presenting Chris Potter (1993)	Concentric Circles (1994)

Presenting Chris Potter is the debut album led by jazz saxophonist Chris Potter which was recorded on December 29, 1992, and released in 1993 in the Netherlands by the Criss Cross Jazz label. It features Potter in a quintet with trumpeter John Swana, pianist Kevin Hays, bassist Christian McBride and drummer Lewis Nash.

Professional ratings
Review scores
Source	Rating
AllMusic	3/5 stars
The Penguin Guide to Jazz Recordings	3.5/4 stars

== Track listing ==
All compositions by Chris Potter except where noted

1. "Juggernaut" − 8:09
2. "Uneasy Dreams" − 8:26
3. "The Tail That Wags the Dog" − 9:31
4. "Reflections" (Thelonious Monk) − 7:12
5. "So Far" − 10:49
6. "Solar" (Miles Davis) − 6:21
7. "Cindy's Story" − 8:43
8. "General Rodney" – 6:15

== Personnel ==
- Chris Potter - tenor saxophone, alto saxophone, soprano saxophone
- John Swana – trumpet, flugelhorn
- Kevin Hays − piano
- Christian McBride − bass
- Lewis Nash - drums
