= Follow the Red Line =

Live album by Chris Potter Underground
- Released: 2007
- Recorded: February 15–17, 2007
- Venues: Village Vanguard, New York City
- Genre: Jazz
- Length: 75:19
- Label: Sunnyside
- Producers: Chris Potter, Louise Holland

Chris Potter chronology
Song for Anyone (2007)	Follow the Red Line (2007)	Ultrahang (2009)

Follow the Red Line (subtitled Live at the Village Vanguard) is the third live album by jazz saxophonist Chris Potter recorded in February 2007 & released later that year on the Sunnyside label. It features Potter with guitarist Adam Rogers, keyboardist Craig Taborn and drummer Nate Smith.

== Reception ==
Professional ratings
Review scores
Source	Rating
Allmusic	3.5/5 stars
All About Jazz	4.5/5 stars
All About Jazz	4.5/5 stars
The Penguin Guide to Jazz Recordings	3.5/4 stars

The Allmusic review by Michael G. Nastos awarded the album 3 1/2 stars stating "For Potter's fans, this is a worthwhile addition to his growing discography. Considering Potter as a new music composer, this indicates how his music is changing and still flowering, and in a developmental stage. Evidently Potter and the audience were very pleased with the results".

All About Jazz correspondent John Kelman observed "It's an exercise in futility to find a name for the music of Follow the Red Line. But as Potter blurs the lines between jazz, rock, funk and even a little afro- beat in ways that are finally being accepted again two decades after The New York Times declared the "pestilence known as fusion is dead," the best word to describe this recording is, quite simply, great". Another review by Martin Longley stated "Potter penned nearly all the disc's pieces, all averaging around 13 minutes apiece; ample time to drive a powerful rhythmic point deep into the bowels. ... The extended length of these numbers is a bonus, as their live crackle is properly encapsulated on plastic, a valuable souvenir of what must have been an electrifying residency".

In JazzTimes, David R. Adler wrote "All the material on Red Line is new. The takes are long, and we can hear Potter count off the tempos. His writing is full of tension and release, combining short, syncopated hooks and involved unison lines, open-ended vamps and passages of rippling harmonic complexity".

The iTunes release of the album included a bonus track of "Morning Bell" by Radiohead.

== Track listing ==
All compositions by Chris Potter except where indicated

1. "Train" – 15:59
2. "Arjuna" – 14:41
3. "Pop Tune #1" – 11:56
4. "Viva Las Vilnius" – 12:59
5. "Zea" – 6:52
6. "Togo" (Ed Blackwell) – 12:55

== Personnel ==
- Chris Potter – tenor saxophone
- Adam Rogers − guitar
- Craig Taborn – Fender Rhodes
- Nate Smith – drums
