= Side-Eye NYC (V1.IV) =

Live album by Pat Metheny
- Released: September 10, 2021
- Recorded: September 10–11, 2019
- Length: 62:41
- Label: Modern Recordings
- Producer: Pat Metheny; Steve Rodby

Pat Metheny chronology
Road to the Sun (2021)	Side-Eye NYC (V1.IV) (2021)	Dream Box (2023)

Side-Eye NYC (V1.IV) is a live album by the jazz guitarist Pat Metheny released on September 10, 2021. It features Metheny playing with his band Side-Eye in New York City in 2019. The album contains a mixtures of new compositions and ones Metheny had played on previous albums.

== Background ==
Pat Metheny formed Side-Eye as a means to collaborate with younger musicians. He also intended Side-Eye to have a rotating lineup of musicians. Metheny invited the keyboardist James Francies, and they both played with different drummers in Side-Eye, before settling on Marcus Gilmore for their 2019 U.S. tour. Side-Eye NYC (V1.IV) was recorded in New York City on September 11 and 12, 2019, and it was released on September 10, 2021. After its release, Metheny toured with Side-Eye in the United States and Europe. For the entire tour, Joe Dyson replaced Gilmore. Chris Fishman took over Francies' role in the European leg of the tour.

== Composition ==
Side-Eye NYC (V1.IV) features eight tracks and runs for 60 minutes. The tracks are a mixture of new compositions and ones that Metheny had recorded earlier in his career. "It Starts When We Disappear", "Lodger", and "Zenith Blues" all debuted on Side-Eye NYC (V1.IV). "Better Days Ahead" was originally from Metheny's 1989 album Letter from Home, and "Bright Size Life" and "Sirabhorn" came from Metheny's debut album Bright Size Life. "Timeline" debuted on the saxophonist Michael Brecker’s album Time Is of The Essence, and Metheny first performed "Turnaround", a composition by Ornette Coleman, on the album 80/81.

== Reception ==
Professional ratings
Aggregate scores
Source	Rating
Metacritic	78/100
Review scores
Source	Rating
AllMusic	4/5 stars
The Guardian	4/5 stars
Jazzwise	4/5 stars
PopMatters	7/10
The Times	4/5 stars

According to the review aggregator Metacritic, Side-Eye NYC (V1.IV) received "universal acclaim" based on a weighted average score of 82 out of 100 from five critic scores. Thom Jurek of AllMusic praised its sound, stating "Side-Eye NYC (V1.IV) offers an astonishing portrait of the many places Metheny has been, and intimates where he may yet go". Doug Collette of Glide Magazine stated that "Satisfying as it is as (re)new(ed) Metheny music, this album will also whet the appetites of his aficionados and jazz lovers in general for future installments in the series". Lucy Tauss of JazzTimes believed "The Side-Eye concept is a great setting for [Metheny], and a dream gig for any young musician who gets to play in the group—and benefit from Metheny’s experience the way he benefited from his elders all those years ago". Jeremy Levine wrote in PopMatters that Side-Eye NYC (V1.IV)'s "impressive musicianship… creates an exciting, ever-changing evening of music that’s as accessible as it is engaging". Chris Pearson of the Times praised Francies and Gilmore, and he wrote that "it's sometimes hard to believe that you are listening to a trio".

== Track listing ==
All tracks are written by Pat Metheny, except where noted.

Side-Eye NYC (V1.IV) track listing
No.	Title	Writer(s)	Length
1.	"It Starts When We Disappear"		13:47
2.	"Better Days Ahead" (Arranged by Pat Metheny and James Francies)		5:26
3.	"Timeline"		7:12
4.	"Bright Size Life"		5:34
5.	"Lodger"		6:16
6.	"Sirabhorn"		5:07
7.	"Turnaround"	Ornette Coleman	7:42
8.	"Zenith Blues"		11:37
Total length:			62:41

== Personnel ==
- Pat Metheny – guitars, bass guitar, orchestrionics
- James Francies – piano, synthesizers, organ
- Marcus Gilmore – drums

=== Technical staff ===
- Pat Metheny – producer, arranger
- Steve Rodby – co-producer
- David Sholemson, Ted Kurland – executive producer
- Peter Karam – recording, mixing, mastering
- Doyle Partners – artwork, design
