= Moving In (album) =

Studio album by Chris Potter
- Released: 1996
- Recorded: February 6–7, 1996
- Genre: Jazz
- Length: 68:19
- Label: Concord
- Producer: Nick Phillips

Chris Potter chronology
Sundiata (1995)	Moving In (1996)	Concord Duo Series Volume Ten (1996)

Moving In is an album by saxophonist Chris Potter. It was recorded in 1996 and released later that year by Concord. It features Potter in a quartet with pianist Brad Mehldau, bassist Larry Grenadier and drummer Billy Hart.

== Music and recording ==
Potter plays tenor sax on most of the tracks. He switches to soprano sax for "Book of Kells" and "A Kiss to Build a Dream On". On "Chorale", he plays bass clarinet. The title track is played in 5/4 time.

== Reception ==
The AllMusic reviewer wrote that "Concept-wise, this isn't Potter's boldest offering. But the playing is emotionally charged and technically superb." The Chicago Tribune reviewer commented that Potter's album was "the boldest recording of his career".

Professional ratings
Review scores
Source	Rating
AllMusic	4/5 stars
The Penguin Guide to Jazz	3.5/4 stars

== Track listing ==
1. "Nero's Fiddle" – 7:02
2. "Book Of Kells" – 7:20
3. "Moving In" – 6:33
4. "A Kiss to Build a Dream On" – 7:24
5. "Rhubarb" – 7:24
6. "South for the Winter" – 7:16
7. "The Forest" – 8:40
8. "Pelog" – 5:18
9. "Chorale" – 4:54
10. "Old Faithful" – 6:25

== Personnel ==
- Chris Potter – tenor sax, soprano sax, bass clarinet
- Brad Mehldau – piano
- Larry Grenadier – bass
- Billy Hart – drums
