= Old Locks and Irregular Verbs =

Studio album by Henry Threadgill
- Released: 1 April 2016
- Recorded: May 22, 2015
- Studios: Systems Two, Brooklyn
- Genre: Jazz
- Length: 47:00
- Label: Pi Recordings
- Producer: Liberty Ellman

Henry Threadgill chronology
In for a Penny, In for a Pound (2015)	Old Locks and Irregular Verbs (2016)

Old Locks and Irregular Verbs is an album by American jazz saxophonist Henry Threadgill, which was recorded in 2015 and released on Pi Recordings. It features an extended work that Threadgill composed as a tribute to cornetist and composer-conductor Lawrence D. Butch Morris, who died in 2013. Morris and Threadgill were old friends and colleagues on the New York City jazz scene; they both performed on Ming (1980) by David Murray. Threadgill formed a new band for the occasion named Ensemble Double Up, a septet where he doesn't play, but instead conducts.

== Reception ==
Professional ratings
Review scores
Source	Rating
Down Beat	4/5 stars
PopMatters	9/10 stars
All About Jazz	4.5/5 stars

The Pitchfork review by Seth Colter Walls states, "Despite the fact it doesn't contain a single note of his own searing saxophone playing, Old Locks and Irregular Verbs remains pure Threadgill—and a highlight in career stocked with more than a few classics."

In a review for Stereophile, Fred Kaplan says about the album, "It's his true career milestone, one of the great jazz compositions of the past several years, a musical masterpiece beyond category."

The Down Beat review by Bill Meyer notes, "Threadgill doesn't attempt to shape the music on the fly the way Morris did, but ensures that the transitions from full-band statements to smaller interactions occur without loss of momentum or clarity."

In his review for PopMatters John Garratt states, "Henry Threadgill may be in his early 70s, but he continues to make music that sounds like no one else. Even when he branches out and doesn't quite sound like himself, he remains inimitable to a startling degree."

The All About Jazz review by Dan Bilawsky says, "Threadgill's masterful blend of the independent and interdependent is alive and well in Old Locks and Irregular Verbs."

== Track listing ==
All compositions by Henry Threadgill

1. "Part One" – 19:16
2. "Part Two" – 3:53
3. "Part Three" – 16:39
4. "Part Four" – 7:12

== Personnel ==
- Henry Threadgill - composition
- Jason Moran – piano
- David Virelles – piano
- Roman Filiu – alto sax
- Curtis Macdonald – alto sax
- Christopher Hoffman – cello
- Jose Davila – tuba
- Craig Weinrib – drums
