= Concord Duo Series Volume Ten =

Live album by Chris Potter and Kenny Werner
- Released: 1996
- Recorded: October 9, 1994
- Venue: Maybeck Recital Hall, Berkeley, California
- Genre: Jazz
- Length: 60:40
- Label: Concord
- Producer: Carl Jefferson

Chris Potter chronology
Moving In (1996)	Concord Duo Series Volume Ten (1996)	Unspoken (1997)

Concord Duo Series Volume Ten is an album by jazz saxophonist Chris Potter and pianist Kenny Werner which was recorded at Maybeck Recital Hall and released by Concord in 1996.

Professional ratings
Review scores
Source	Rating
Allmusic	3/5 stars
The Penguin Guide to Jazz Recordings	4/4 stars

== Track listing ==
All compositions by Chris Potter except where noted

1. "Hibiscus" − 8:35
2. "Boulevard of Broken Time" (Kenny Werner) − 8:37
3. "Istanbul (Not Constantinople)" (Jimmy Kennedy, Nat Simon) − 5:23
4. "Sail Away" (Tom Harrell) − 6:03
5. "Tala" (Chris Potter, Kenny Werner) − 4:32
6. "September Song" (Kurt Weill, Maxwell Anderson) − 6:31
7. "The New Left (And We Have Our Own Talk Show Host)" − 6:16
8. "Epistrophy" (Thelonious Monk, Kenny Clarke) − 4:26
9. "Hey Reggie" (Werner) − 7:16
10. "Giant Steps" (John Coltrane) − 3:01

== Personnel ==
- Chris Potter - tenor saxophone, soprano saxophone, bass clarinet
- Kenny Werner - piano
