= Alana Davis =

American singer-songwriter

- Born: May 6, 1974 (age 52)
- Origin: New York City, New York, U.S.
- Genres: Pop
- Occupation: Singer-songwriter
- Years active: 1997–present
- Labels: Elektra; SME; Tigress; Cleopatra
- Website: www.alanadavis.com

Alana Schofield Davis (born May 6, 1974) is an American singer-songwriter. Her father, Walter Davis Jr., was an African-American pianist who played alongside such jazz greats as Charlie Parker and Dizzy Gillespie. Her mother was Ann Marie Schofield, and Alana grew up in Greenwich Village, Manhattan.

A record deal with Elektra Records produced Davis' first two albums; Blame It on Me, which was chosen as one of Time's five best albums of 1997, and 2001's Fortune Cookies, which featured production by The Neptunes and Ed Tuton. She released videos of the songs "32 Flavors" and "Crazy."

Davis achieved a radio hit with the single "32 Flavors" from her debut album. The song is a cover version of a track written and previously recorded by Ani DiFranco. Blame It on Me stayed on the Billboard Top 200 for seven weeks, peaking at No. 157 in February 1998 and reaching sales of over 240,000 in the United States. "Murder", also from Blame It on Me, was sampled on Jay-Z's Vol. 3... Life and Times of S. Carter.

After a guest appearance on the 1999 soundtrack to The Mod Squad, Davis left Elektra and signed a single deal with SME Records. She released the single "Carry On" on this label, and the song was featured in a Super Bowl commercial for Sony Electronics.

Tired of major record labels, Davis went independent in 2005 and formed her own label, Tigress Records. She released a third album, Surrender Dorothy, on this label, which featured the single "Wide Open."

In 2006, Davis toured with Thievery Corporation for a couple of dates as a guest vocalist. In July 2017, Davis played 2 shows, one in Rochester, New York, and one in New York City. In May 2018, Davis released her 4th studio album, Love Again.

== Discography ==
=== Albums ===
- Blame It on Me (September 23, 1997, No. 157 US)
- Fortune Cookies (October 30, 2001)
- Surrender Dorothy (February 22, 2005)
- Love Again (May 4, 2018)

=== Singles ===
Year	Title	Chart Positions			Album
Year	Title	US Hot 100	Adult Top 40	Top 40 Mainstream	Album
1997	"32 Flavors"	37	17	34	Blame It on Me
1998	"Crazy"	–	29	37	Blame It on Me
2001	"I Want You"	–	–	–	Fortune Cookies
2002	"Carry On"	–	–	–	non-album single
2005	"Wide Open"	–	–	–	Surrender Dorothy
