= Kate Weare =

American choreographer (born 1972)

- Born: May 21, 1972 (age 54); Oakland, California
- Education: CalArts (BFA '94)
- Occupations: choreographer, artistic director
- Known for: founder, Kate Weare Company

Kate Weare is an American choreographer. She is the founder and artistic director of the Kate Weare Company.

== Early life and education ==
Weare was raised in the San Francisco Bay Area. She attended the California Institute of the Arts, earning a Bachelor of Fine Arts degree in 1994.

== Career ==
Kate Weare has presented her choreography globally, in cities such as Los Angeles, San Francisco, New York, London, Belgrade and Vienna. Upon moving to New York City in 2000, she was twice asked to present work by Dance Theater Workshop, and presented work at Joyce Soho, Danspace at St. Mark's Church, Judson Church, DancemOpolitan at Joe's Pub, The 92nd St. Y, The Puffin Room, New York University's Frederick Loewe Theater, The Kitchen, WAX, BAX, and La Mama. She has collaborated and shared her concerts with many choreographers such as Paul Taylor and Karl Anderson.

While she is a minimalist choreographer, emotionally she explores the areas of love, femininity, strength and sexuality. Her movement ranges from seductive partnering and strong lifts, to witty gestures and lush movement phrases. She is interested in the kind of theatrical dance wherein narrative is implied but never specified and gives evidence of having thought deeply and fruitfully about her intentions. The New York Times noted: "Ms. Weare is simply the choreographer of her own piece."

== Kate Weare Company ==
In 2005, she founded the Kate Weare Company in New York City. The company's dancers include Leslie Kraus, Douglas Gillespie, Bergen Wheeler, Luke Murphy, T.J. Spaur, and Adrian Clark.

== Awards ==
In 1999, San Francisco's Isadora Duncan Dance Award nominated Weare for her duet Suit/Skin. In 2001, Zwei, a film created with Canadian filmmaker Kenji Ouellet, screened at the Dancing for Camera Festival at the American Dance Festival, Dance Theater Workshop’s Film Festival and was an award finalist for the Dance on Camera Screening at Lincoln Center. She was awarded with the 2006/2007 Joyce Soho Residency, and Gwen Welliver mentored her in the studio.

Weare was a 2009 Princess Grace Awards winner. In 2014, she was awarded a Guggenheim Fellowship for Choreography.
