= James Francies =

American jazz pianist

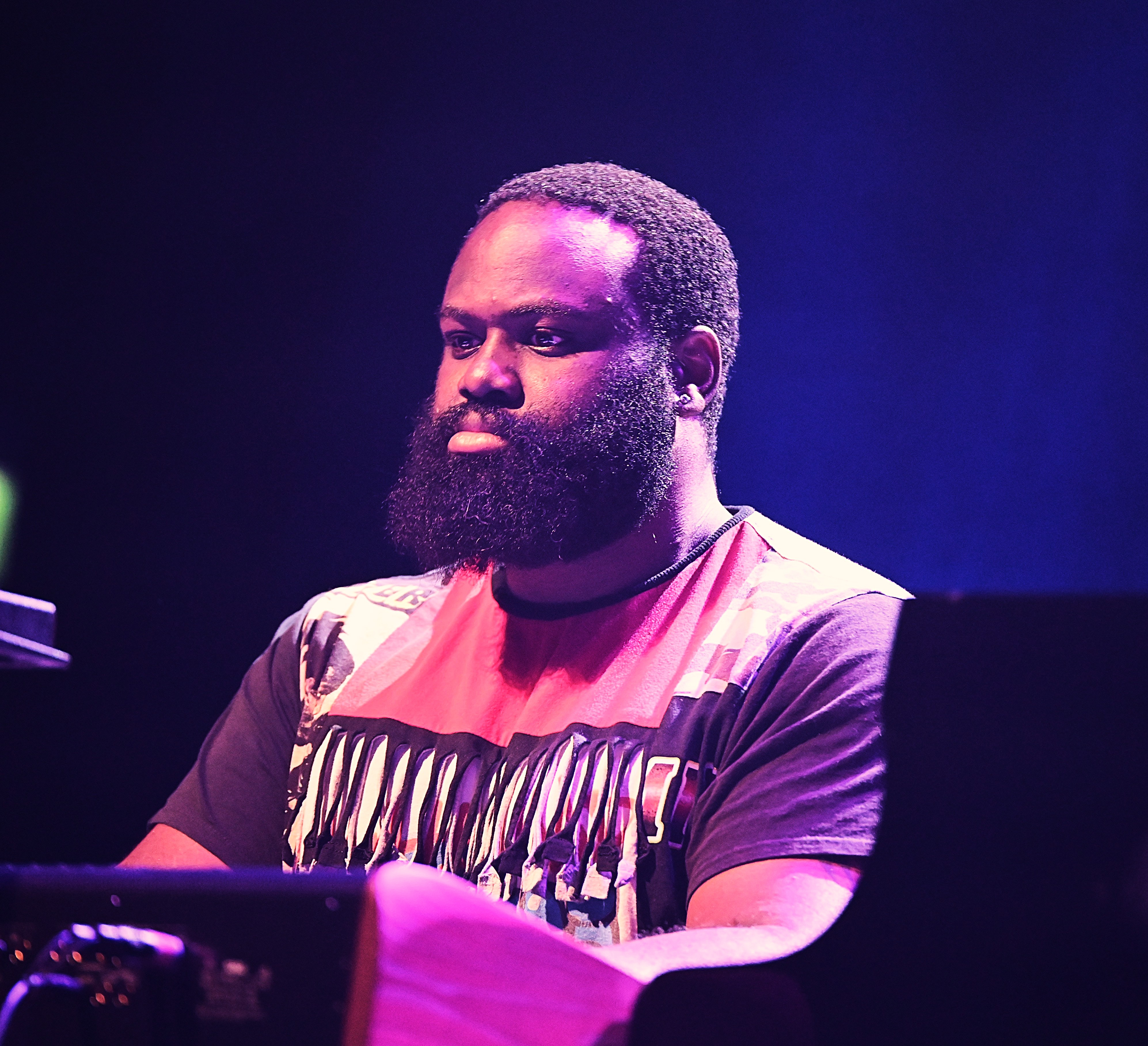
- Francies at Moldejazz 2026

Background information
- Born: 1995 (age 30–31); Houston, Texas, US
- Genres: Jazz
- Occupations: Musician, composer, arranger
- Instruments: Piano, keyboards
- Label: Blue Note
- Website: jamesfranciesmusic.com

James Francies (born 1995) is an American jazz pianist, keyboardist, composer, and arranger. He grew up in Houston but moved to New York to continue his musical studies. Following performances and recordings with various musicians, his first album as leader was released by Blue Note Records in 2018.

== Early life ==
Francies was born in Houston in 1995, and grew up in the South Park neighborhood. He began having piano lessons at the age of five, and learning about jazz at junior high school. He went on to attend the High School for the Performing and Visual Arts in Houston. He played at the church that his parents attended, and formed a jazz trio at the age of 14 that performed for three years.

At high school, Francies was awarded a series of jazz scholarships to aid his musical development. These helped him obtain a full scholarship to study at the New School for Jazz and Contemporary Music in New York.

== Career ==
While a student in New York, Francies became a regular in drummer Jeff "Tain" Watts's band. He played piano on one track for Watts's album Blue, Vol. 1 around 2015. Performances and tours with other leaders, including saxophonist Chris Potter and guitarist Pat Metheny, followed. Francies roomed with pianist Aaron Parks for three years from 2015.

Around 2016, he played on Watts's Blue, Vol. 2, Jaimeo Brown's Work Songs, Marcus Strickland's Nihil Novi, and Chance the Rapper's "No Problem". Francies is also part of vibraphonist Stefon Harris's Blackout, and played on that band's Sonic Creed album.

Francies's debut recording as leader came after he signed for Blue Note Records. The album Flight was released in 2018. All but one of the eleven tracks were written or co-written by Francies; among the other musicians who appeared on the album were bassist Burniss Travis II and drummer Jeremy Dutton, from Francies's band Kinetic. In the same year, Francies was part of vocalist José James's band that played at the Monterey Jazz Festival. Francies won the "Rising Star Keyboards" award in DownBeat magazine's 2022 critics' poll.

Questlove has used Francies as a stand-in for his regular keyboardist with The Roots as part of The Tonight Show Band on The Tonight Show Starring Jimmy Fallon.

== Playing and composing style ==
A reviewer of Flight commented on Francies's "explosive keyboard style, which makes up for what it lacks in thematic development with dazzling fast runs, nuanced textures and unpredictable turns".

Francies has sound-to-color synesthesia. For one of his compositions, "Leaps", he reported that "I literally visualized the song's melodic jumps. I took some musical shapes inside my head and thought about what they would look like in the physical world."

== Discography ==
=== As leader ===
Year recorded	Title	Label	Personnel/Notes
2018	Flight	Blue Note	With Burniss Travis II (bass), Jeremy Dutton (drums); Mike Moreno (guitar) on four tracks; Joel Ross (vibraphone) on four tracks; Chris Potter (tenor sax) on three tracks; Mike Mitchell (drums) on one track; YEBBA, Chris Turner, and Kate Kelsey-Sugg (vocals) on one track each
2021	Purest Form	Blue Note	With Burniss Travis II (bass), Jeremy Dutton (drums); guests Immanuel Wilkins (alto sax), Joel Ross (vibraphone), Mike Moreno (guitar), Peyton, Elliott Skinner, and Bilal (vocals)

=== As sideman ===
Year recorded	Leader	Title	Label
2015	Jeff "Tain" Watts	Blue, Vol. 1	Dark Key
2016?	Jaimeo Brown	Work Songs	Motéma
2016?	Marcus Strickland	Nihil Novi	Blue Note
2016	Chance the Rapper	Coloring Book	(Self-released)
2016	Jeff "Tain" Watts	Blue, Vol. 2	Dark Key
2017	Chris Potter	Circuits	Edition
2018?	Stefon Harris	Sonic Creed	Motéma
2020	Chris Potter	Sunrise Reprise	Edition
2021	Pat Metheny	Side-Eye NYC (V1.IV)	Modern Recordings
