= Underground (Chris Potter album) =

Studio album by Chris Potter
- Released: 2006
- Recorded: January 31, 2006
- Venues: Systems Two Studios, Brooklyn, NY
- Genre: Jazz
- Length: 69:44
- Labels: Sunnyside; SCC 3034
- Producer: Chris Potter

Chris Potter chronology
Lift: Live at the Village Vanguard (2004)	Underground (2006)	Song for Anyone (2007)

Underground is the tenth studio album by jazz saxophonist Chris Potter, released on the Sunnyside label in 2006. It features guitarist Wayne Krantz, keyboardist Craig Taborn and drummer Nate Smith.

== Reception ==
Professional ratings
Review scores
Source	Rating
Allmusic	3.5/5 stars
All About Jazz	4.5/5 stars
The Guardian	4/5 stars
The Penguin Guide to Jazz Recordings	3/4 stars

The Allmusic review by Thom Jurek awarded the album 3 1/2 stars stating "Underground won't come close to appealing to everyone, but so what? It's a fine Potter outing and studio documentation of a fine band that has actually kept the jazz in fusion and vice versa".

All About Jazz correspondent John Kelman observed "With Underground Potter delivers the album that his consistently impressive past efforts only suggested was possible. Combining complex and emotionally wide-reaching compositions with often knotty, yet always accessible grooves, Potter has finally fashioned an album that, more than announcing his potential, delivers it from start to finish with a clear voice ... Potter is by no means at his creative peak—or so we can only hope—but with Underground he has made his most personal and successful statement to date".

In The Guardian, John Fordham wrote "When powerful employers give him the nod, Potter can sound like one of the best saxophonists on the planet, one who seems to have fully absorbed the jazz-sax tradition from Sidney Bechet to Tim Berne. He has been more unsettled as a leader, but this set launches a scalding contemporary-fusion band that includes two gifted younger mavericks".

== Track listing ==
All compositions by Chris Potter except where indicated

1. "Next Best Western" – 9:40
2. "Morning Bell" (Colin Greenwood, Ed O'Brien, Jonny Greenwood, Phil Selway, Thom Yorke) – 5:41
3. "Nudnik" – 9:53
4. "Lotus Blossom" (Billy Strayhorn) – 5:09
5. "Big Top" – 11:46
6. "The Wheel" – 6:59
7. "Celestial Nomad" – 6:28
8. "Underground" – 11:11
9. "Yesterday" (John Lennon, Paul McCartney) – 2:50

== Personnel ==
- Chris Potter – tenor saxophone
- Wayne Krantz, Adam Rogers (tracks 6 & 9) − guitar
- Craig Taborn – Fender Rhodes
- Nate Smith – drums
