= Jeremy McCoy (double bassist) =

Canadian-American double bassist (born 1963)

- Born: July 13, 1963 (age 63); Toronto, Ontario
- Genres: Classical
- Occupations: Musician, educator
- Instrument: Double bass
- Years active: ca. 1983–present
- Website: jeremymccoy.net

Jeremy McCoy (born 1963) is a Canadian-American double bassist known for his work as an orchestral musician, soloist, chamber musician, studio session player and teacher. He is assistant principal double bass with the Metropolitan Opera Orchestra in New York City.

McCoy was born in Toronto, Ontario in 1963 but was raised in Ottawa. His earliest musical training was from age 6, on piano and as a chorister. McCoy took an interest in double bass while at Greenbank Middle School and in 1977, he began to study the instrument with David Currie. He received additional instruction from Oscar Zimmerman, Winston Budrow and Thorvald Fredin. He received his Bachelor of Music from the Curtis Institute of Music as a student of Roger Scott.

== Career ==
=== Performance ===
Jeremy McCoy began his professional career in 1984 as a member of the National Arts Centre Orchestra. In 1985, McCoy joined the Metropolitan Opera Orchestra in New York City and was subsequently promoted to Assistant Principal double bass, which is the chair he currently holds.

He has also performed as Principal double bass with festival orchestras including the Canadian Chamber Orchestra, Classical Tahoe, and the Mostly Mozart Festival Orchestra.

McCoy has made many festival appearances as a chamber musician including Marlboro Music, Lincoln Center Festival, Ottawa International Chamber Music Festival, Close Encounters with Music, Rockport Music, Bowdoin International Music Festival, Kneisel Hall and Cooperstown Summer Music Festival. In 1995, McCoy performed the Canadian premiere of Jon Deak’s Pulitzer Prize-nominated concerto, Jack and the Beanstalk.

McCoy has released two solo recordings, Dialogues with Double Bass (Bridge Records) and Baroque Legacy (MSR Classics).

With the groups Ensemble Sospeso, Sequitur, and Speculum Musica, McCoy has premiered and recorded chamber works by contemporary classical composers including Ades, Andriessen, Carter, Del Tredic, Druckman, Lachenmann, Meltzer, Musgrave, Neuwirth, Patitucci Rakowski, Shore, and Wolff.

As a session musician, McCoy has recorded scores and string tracks for motion picture and television soundtracks as well as popular artists.

=== Teaching ===
McCoy has written articles on double bass repertoire and technique for Strings Magazine. He has presented masterclasses at leading schools of music throughout the United States, Canada, Sweden and Japan, and serves on the faculties of the Manhattan School of Music, Bard College Conservatory of Music and the National Youth Orchestra of Canada, and the Bowdoin International Music Festival.He has also taught at the National Youth Orchestra of Canada, Columbia University and the Aaron Copland School of Music
