= Kinfolk: Postcards from Everywhere =

Studio album by Nate Smith
- Released: February 3, 2017
- Genre: Jazz fusion; funk; soul; R&B
- Length: 56:09
- Label: Ropeadope

Nate Smith chronology
Workday, Waterbaby Music, Vol. 1.0 (2008)	Kinfolk: Postcards from Everywhere (2017)	Pocket Change (2018)

Singles from Kinfolk: Postcards from Everywhere
- 1. "Pages" Released: January 6, 2017

Kinfolk: Postcards from Everywhere is the second studio album by American musician Nate Smith, and his first as bandleader of the namesake band Kinfolk. It was released on February 3, 2017, on Ropeadope Records.

== Background and release ==
Nate Smith's first full album since his 2008 debut Workday, Waterbury Music, Vol. 1.0 and his first as bandleader, Kinfolk: Postcards from Everywhere was described by Smith as "certainly the biggest project I've ever done," involving the core band Kinfolk as well as a rotating cast of featured musicians. Regarding the decision to release his debut album as bandleader at age 42, Smith said, "It was time to see what I could say if I really went all in and committed to making a record that sounded like all of my influences."

Smith released the track "Pages" featuring singer Gretchen Parlato as an online single on January 6, 2017, which Smith described as "a melody that I wrote a long time ago — a song that evokes this idea of recalling memories, of sentimentality. That’s something that I wanted to explore on this album."

Smith cited several inspirations for particular tracks on the album, including Earth, Wind & Fire for the track "Skip Step", Miles Davis's Tutu for the track "Bounce, Pts. I + II", and the killing of Trayvon Martin for the track "Disenchantment: The Weight". The album also features themes of youth and family, including several snippets of interviews Smith conducted with his parents.

In November 2017, Smith alongside Kinfolk performed three tracks from the album in a Tiny Desk Concert for NPR Music.

== Critical reception ==
Professional ratings
Review scores
Source	Rating
All About Jazz	4/5 stars
DownBeat	4/5 stars
PopMatters	8/10

Kinfolk: Postcards from Everywhere was met with positive reviews. Tom Moon of NPR Music called the album "a study in nomadic jazz" that "emphasizes catchy, singable melodies and spring-loaded backbeats". Giovanni Russonello of The New York Times wrote of the album's grooves: "all sorts of sounds participate in building the rhythm: taut but resonant bass notes, clipped guitar playing, zagging saxophone lines. The result is a sound that's tart, bittersweet and almost nostalgic." Peter Margasak of Chicago Reader commended Smith's command as a bandleader, also writing that the album demonstrates "a sleek strain of R&B and funk that showcases his improvisational elasticity."

In a 4-star review for DownBeat magazine, Chris Tart described the album as "generally upbeat, with an emphasis on heady hip-hop beats and soul-jazz melodies," also noting the album's ensemble of "renowned jazz musicians, like bassist Dave Holland and saxophonist Chris Potter, as well as a rotating cast of solid vocalists." Bobby Reed of DownBeat wrote that "The album mainly consists of Smith's original compositions, but his moody interpretation of avant-pop band Stereolab's 1999 song 'The Spiracles' illustrates his willingness to reach outside the jazz realm for inspiration," adding that "There’s only one drum solo on this album, a sign that Smith ... has become a generous leader who eschews flash in favor of substance."

Will Layman of PopMatters described the album as "Glasper-esque... in the best way," noting its fusion of jazz and contemporary soul music, remarking, "It is one of those 'jazz' records that probably wouldn't have been possible until recently — a collection that has plenty of authentic, harmonically complex improvising but also uses soul grooves and vocals to forge a connection back to pop music."

== Track listing ==
No.	Title	Length
1.	"Intro: Wish You Were Here"	0:29
2.	"Skip Step"	3:04
3.	"Bounce, Pts. I + II"	5:33
4.	"Mom: Postcards from Detroit/Floyd/Salem"	0:45
5.	"Retold"	4:54
6.	"Disenchantment: The Weight" (feat. Amma Whatt)	5:42
7.	"Spinning Down"	8:40
8.	"Pages" (feat. Gretchen Parlato)	3:51
9.	"From Here: Interlude"	2:34
10.	"Morning and Allison" (feat. Amma Whatt)	5:06
11.	"Spiracles"	5:26
12.	"Small Moves: Interlude"	2:30
13.	"Dad: Postcards from Isaac Street"	1:36
14.	"Home Free (for Peter Joe)"	5:50
Total length:		56:09

== Personnel ==
Adapted from Bandcamp.

Kinfolk

- Nate Smith – drums, percussion, Rhodes piano, synthesizer
- Kris Bowers – piano, Rhodes piano
- Fima Ephron – electric bass
- Jeremy Most – guitar
- Jaleel Shaw – alto and soprano saxophone

Featured musicians

- Dave Holland – acoustic bass (2, 7)
- Lionel Loueke – guitar (2, 7)
- Michael Mayo – vocals, vocal percussion (2, 5)
- Chris Potter – tenor saxophone (3)
- Amma Whatt – vocals (6, 10)
- Gretchen Parlato – vocals (8)
- Adam Rogers – guitar (11)

Strings

- Stephanie Matthews – violin (6, 9)
- Juliette Jones – violin (6, 9)
- Christiana Liberis – viola (6, 9)
- Reenat Pinchas – cello (6, 9)
