= Circuits (Chris Potter album) =

Studio album by Chris Potter
- Released: February 22, 2019
- Recorded: September 2017
- Studio: GSI Studios, New York City
- Genre: Jazz
- Length: 61:34
- Label: Edition
- Producer: Chris Potter

Chris Potter chronology
The Dreamer Is the Dream (2017)	Circuits (2019)	There Is a Tide (2020)

Circuits is a 2019 studio album by jazz saxophonist Chris Potter, his first to be released on the Edition label. It features Potter with keyboardist James Francies, bass guitarist Linley Marthe and drummer Eric Harland.

== Reception ==
Professional ratings
Review scores
Source	Rating
All About Jazz	4.5/5 stars
Financial Times	4/5 stars
Jazz Journal	4.5/5 stars
The Times	4/5 stars

The Financial Times review by Mike Hobart awarded the album 4 stars, noting that "the tracks in the multi-instrumentalist’s new album recall the sound of his old Underground quartet" and calling it "a return to gritty fusion jazz".

Writing for All About Jazz, Sammy Stein summarised the album by saying "Circuits is a terrific recording, and what it does is show Potter at his show-stopping best. But it also incorporates modern electronic sounds, demonstrating that there is no line in jazz. Modern can match with traditional influences and merge to develop something verging on the extraordinary". In the same publication, Roger Farbey described Circuits as "an early contender for album of the year", saying "Circuits carries considerable visceral heft and largely thanks to Potter's multi-instrumental versatility there's an occasional big band feel to the tracks. In any event, this album demonstrates, once again, the mark of Potter's true virtuosity and ingenuity".

Dave Jones of Jazz Journal also gave a positive review, opining that "This is definitely an album to savour, with strong compositions and excellent playing from a well-chosen team".

In The Times, Chris Pearson noted the stylistic departure from Potter's recent ECM Records releases, saying "Chris Potter is one of the world’s best saxophonists, a master at mixing modern musical genres with conviction, but it has been hard to embrace the diffuse, introspective discs he has recorded of late. With Circuits, his first release with the British label Edition, he consciously gets back to the groove and the result is a relief. His lyricism remains, but the music to which it is applied has far more grit and energy".

== Track listing ==
Compositions by Chris Potter except where noted

1. "Invocation" − 2:08
2. "Hold It" − 6:49
3. "The Nerve" − 8:30
4. "Koutomé" − 6:47 (Amenoudji Joseph Vicky)
5. "Circuits" − 9:26
6. "Green Pastures" − 8:24
7. "Queens of Brooklyn" − 3:34
8. "Exclamation" − 7:16
9. "Pressed for Time" − 8:35 (James Francies)

== Personnel ==
- Chris Potter – soprano saxophone, tenor saxophone, clarinet, flute, sampler, guitar, keyboards, percussion
- James Francies – keyboards
- Linley Marthe – bass guitar
- Eric Harland – drums
