= Proof: The Science of Booze =

2014 book

- Author: Adam Rogers
- Publisher: Houghton Mifflin Harcourt
- Publication date: June 3, 2014
- Pages: 272
- ISBN: 978-0-547-89796-7

Proof: The Science of Booze is a 2014 nonfiction book by Adam Rogers, published by Houghton Mifflin Harcourt.

== Overview ==
The book explores all aspects of alcohol's production, consumption, and effects. It describes the process of producing alcoholic beverages, from fermentation to aging. It also explores the science of how humans are affected by alcohol, physiologically and psychologically, such as the hangover. Rogers also discusses the olfactory experience of alcohol.

== Reception ==
The book received a starred review from Kirkus Reviews, which praised the book's "lucidity, brisk enthusiasm and humor, which helps lighten the science." Diane Leach of PopMatters scored the book 8 out of 10 points.

Gregory Cowles of The New York Times praised the book, writing that its "descriptions of the science behind familiar drinks exert a seductive pull" but that its "pert, gee-whiz tone" might put off some readers.

Sam Kean of The Wall Street Journal "Mr. Rogers's book has much the same effect as a good drink. You get a warm sensation, you want to engage with the wider world, and you feel smarter than you probably are. Above all, it makes you understand just how deeply human it is to take a drink."
