= Fortune Cookies (album) =

Studio album by Alana Davis
- Released: October 30, 2001
- Recorded: Magic Shop, New York City; Joe Music; Ed Tuton's house
- Genre: Pop
- Length: 52:06
- Label: Elektra
- Producer: Ed Tuton, Alana Davis, Josh Deutsch, The Neptunes

Alana Davis chronology
| Blame It on Me (1997) | Fortune Cookies (2001) | Surrender Dorothy (2005) |

Professional ratings
Review scores
| Source | Rating |
|---|---|
| AllMusic | 4/5 stars |

Fortune Cookies is the second album by Alana Davis, released in 2001. It peaked at #34 on Billboard's Heatseekers Album chart.

== Track listing ==
All tracks are written by Alana Davis except as noted.

| No. | Title | Writer(s) | Length |
|---|---|---|---|
| 1. | "Save the Day" | | 4:49 |
| 2. | "I Want You" (cover of Third Eye Blind, 1997) | Stephan Jenkins | 4:17 |
| 3. | "When You Became King" | | 4:19 |
| 4. | "How Many of Us Have Them (Friends)" (cover of Whodini, 1984) | Davis, Josh Deutsch, Jalil Hutchins, Lawrence Smith | 3:55 |
| 5. | "I Don't Care (Lonesome Road)" (cover of Selfish, a Swedish band, 1998) | David Shutrick | 5:00 |
| 6. | "Bye Bye" | Alana Davis, Chad Hugo, Pharrell Williams | 3:05 |
| 7. | "Under the Rainbow" | | 5:17 |
| 8. | "A Chance with You" | | 4:16 |
| 9. | "God of Love" | Jack Daley, Davis, Ed Tuton | 4:33 |
| 10. | "Got This Far" | | 4:44 |
| 11. | "Easy to Love" | | 7:52 |
| Total length: | | | 52:06 |
