= Surrender Dorothy (album) =

Studio album by Alana Davis
- Released: February 22, 2005
- Genre: Rock
- Length: 46:34
- Label: Tigress
- Producer: Alana Davis

Alana Davis chronology
Fortune Cookies (2001)	Surrender Dorothy (2005)

Professional ratings
Review scores
Source	Rating
AllMusic	3.5/5 stars

Surrender Dorothy is the third album by Alana Davis. It was released in 2005 on Davis's own label, Tigress Records.

"Surrender Dorothy" is a line from the film The Wizard of Oz.

== Track listing ==
All tracks are written by Alana Davis except as noted.

No.	Title	Writer(s)	Length
1.	"Letter"		3:58
2.	"The Benefit"		5:58
3.	"Create"		4:37
4.	"Vision"		5:45
5.	"Wide Open"		4:48
6.	"Right There"		4:43
7.	"Jaded (Goodbye)"		5:49
8.	"Desert Rose (Higher Than a Lover)"		5:13
9.	"The Reaper" (cover of Blue Öyster Cult, 1976)	Donald Roeser	5:37
10.	"Stay"		4:08
11.	"Nice Time" (cover of Bob Marley & The Wailers, 1966)	Bob Marley	2:46
