= Chris Potter (jazz saxophonist) =

American jazz musician and composer (born 1971)

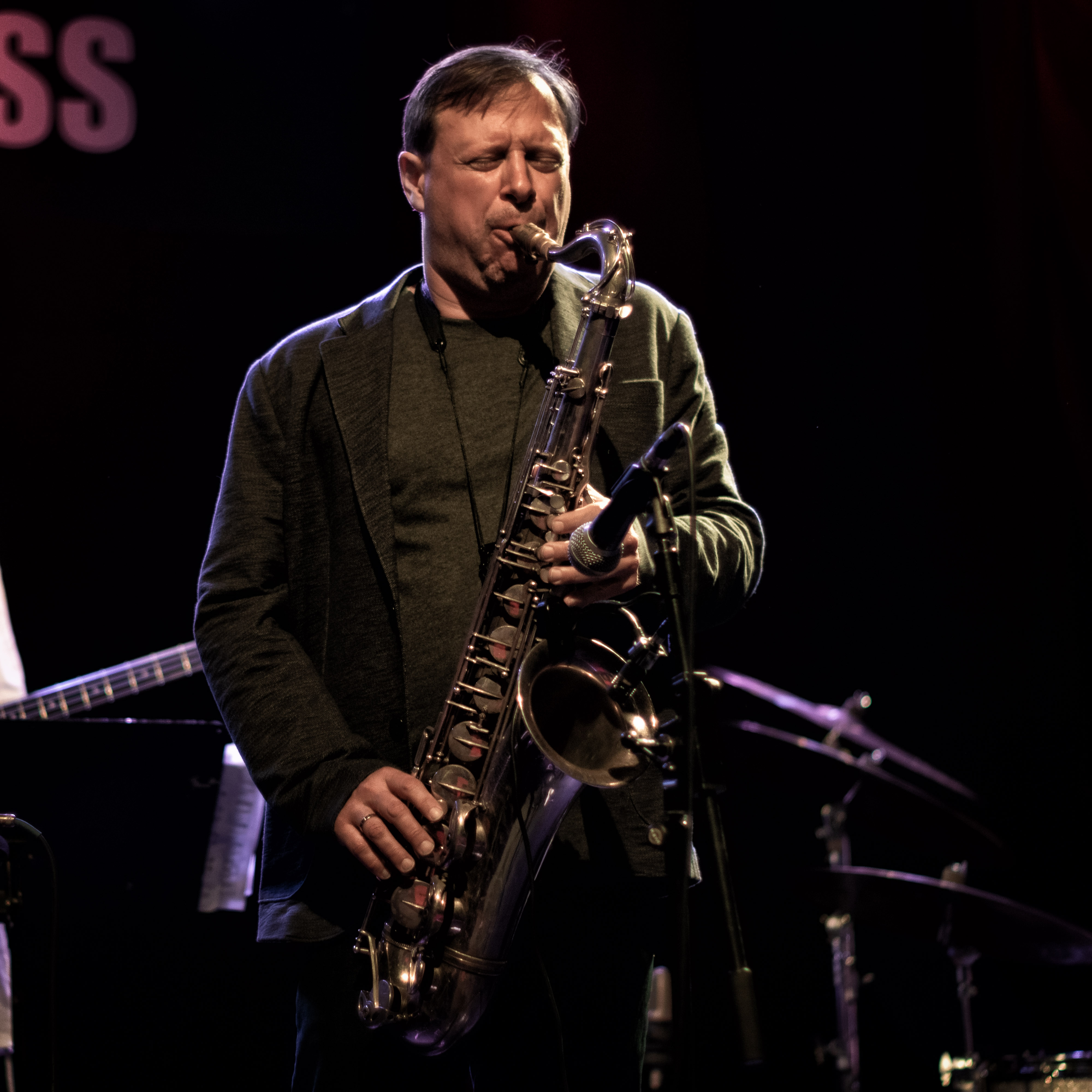
- Chris Potter in Vienna, April 26, 2019

Background information
- Born: January 1, 1971 (age 55); Chicago, Illinois, U.S.
- Genre: Jazz
- Occupation: Musician
- Instruments: Alto saxophone; tenor saxophone; bass clarinet
- Years active: 1990–present
- Labels: Criss Cross; Concord; Verve; Sunnyside; ECM
- Formerly of: Steely Dan
- Website: chrispottermusic.com

Chris Potter (born January 1, 1971) is an American jazz saxophonist, composer, and multi-instrumentalist.

Potter first came to prominence as a sideman with trumpeter Red Rodney (1992–1993), before extended stints with drummer Paul Motian (1994–2009), bassist Dave Holland (1999–2007), trumpeter Dave Douglas (1998–2003) and session work, while also maintaining an active solo career.

== Biography ==
Potter was born in Chicago, Illinois, but his family moved to Columbia, South Carolina, where he spent his formative years. Potter showed an early interest in a wide variety of different music and learned several instruments, including the guitar and piano. He realized after hearing Paul Desmond that the saxophone would be the vehicle that would best allow him to express himself musically. He has been quoted by Jazz Times as saying that, "Music has always been a vehicle for me to investigate the things that are important about life. It's been a way of figuring out what it is I need to say. Plus, I keep learning new things about it."

He took up the alto saxophone at age 10, playing his first jazz gig at 13. He developed a devoted local following while performing with Johnny Helms and Terry Rosen. After leaving Columbia upon his graduation from Dreher High School, Potter attended college in New York City, first at The New School and later at the Manhattan School of Music. In New York he began performing with Red Rodney. He is currently based in New York City.

== Recordings ==
Potter has released over twenty albums as a leader and performed as a sideman on more than 150 more. Some of the artists he has played with include Pat Metheny, Marian McPartland, Patricia Barber, Kenny Werner, the Mingus Big Band, Paul Motian, Ray Brown, Jim Hall, James Moody, Dave Douglas, Joe Lovano, Mike Mainieri, Nguyen Le, Steve Swallow, Steely Dan, Dave Holland and Joanne Brackeen.

His 2006 album Underground, on which he recorded with an electric, "groove"-based ensemble featuring keyboardist Craig Taborn, guitarists Wayne Krantz or Adam Rogers and drummer Nate Smith, was followed by the expansive Follow the Red Line: Live at the Village Vanguard with Rogers on all six of its tracks. This group have reunited with Potter multiple times throughout his career, and recorded & toured extensively.

There is a Tide (2020) was Potter's first album where he performed all the instruments, and was recorded in his home studio during the Covid-19 Pandemic.

== Awards and honors ==
Potter's 1998 album Vertigo was named one of the year's top ten jazz CDs by both Jazziz magazine and The New York Times. The album was inspired by a bout of Ménière's disease that caused severe dizziness and damaged his hearing in one ear. He was nominated for a Grammy Award for Best Jazz Instrumental Solo for his work on the Joanne Brackeen album Pink Elephant Magic. He was awarded the Jazzpar Prize in 2000. His 2004 album Lift: Live at Village Vanguard was named one of the year's ten best jazz recordings by Fred Kaplan of Slate.

Potter has appeared in the Down Beat Critic's and Reader's Polls and named Rising Star for Best Tenor Saxophonist in 2004, 2005, 2006 and 2007. He was honored as Tenor Saxophonist of the Year 2013 by the Jazz Journalists Association.

== Discography ==
=== As leader ===
- Presenting Chris Potter (Criss Cross Jazz, 1993)
- Concentric Circles (Concord Jazz, 1994)
- Pure (Concord Jazz, 1995)
- Sundiata (Criss Cross Jazz, 1995)
- Moving In (Concord Jazz, 1996)
- Concord Duo Series Volume Ten with Kenny Werner (Concord Jazz, 1996) – live rec. 1994
- Unspoken (Concord Jazz, 1997)
- Vertigo (Concord Jazz, 1998)
- This Will Be (Storyville, 2001)
- Gratitude (Verve, 2001)
- Traveling Mercies (Verve, 2002)
- Lift: Live at the Village Vanguard (Sunnyside, 2004)
- Underground (Sunnyside, 2006)
- Song for Anyone (Sunnyside, 2007)
- Follow the Red Line (Sunnyside, 2007)
- Ultrahang (ArtistShare, 2009)
- Transatlantic with DR Big Band (Red Dot Music, 2011) – rec. 2010
- The Sirens (ECM, 2013)
- Imaginary Cities (ECM, 2015)
- The Dreamer Is the Dream (ECM, 2017)
- Circuits (Edition, 2019)
- There Is a Tide (Edition, 2020)
- Sunrise Reprise (Edition, 2021)
- Got the Keys to the Kingdom: Live at the Village Vanguard (Edition, 2023)
- Eagle's Point (Edition, 2024)
- Got the Keys to the Kingdom, Live at the Vilalge Vanguard (Edition, 2025)
- Alive With Ghosts Today (Edition, 2026)

=== As sideman ===
With David Binney

- South (ACT, 2001)
- Welcome to Life (Mythology, 2004)
- Bastion of Sanity (Criss Cross Jazz, 2005)
- Graylen Epicenter (Mythology, 2011)

With Scott Colley

- Portable Universe (Free Lance, 1996)
- Subliminal... (Criss Cross Jazz, 1997)
- This Place (SteepleChase, 1998)
- The Magic Line (ArtistShare, 2008)

With Dave Douglas

- Magic Triangle (Arabesque, 1998)
- Leap of Faith (Arabesque, 1999)
- The Infinite (RCA, 2002)
- Strange Liberation (Bluebird, 2003)

With Fleurine

- San Francisco (Sunnyside, 2008)
- Brazilian Dream (Sunnyside, 2018)

With Greg Gisbert

- Harcology (Criss Cross Jazz, 1994)
- On Second Thought (Criss Cross Jazz, 1994)

With Dave Holland

- Prime Directive (ECM, 1999)
- Not for Nothin' (ECM, 2001)
- What Goes Around (ECM, 2002)
- Extended Play: Live at Birdland (ECM, 2003)
- Overtime (Dare2, 2005)
- Critical Mass (Dare2, 2006)
- The Monterey Quartet (Dave Holland, Gonzalo Rubalcaba, Eric Harland) (Live at the 2007 Monterey Jazz Festival, 2007)
- Pathways (Dare2, 2010)
- Aziza (Dare2, 2016)
- Good Hope (Edition, 2019)

With Ryan Kisor

- On the One (Columbia, 1993)
- Power Source (Criss Cross Jazz, 1999)

With Susannah McCorkle

- Easy to Love: The Songs of Cole Porter (Concord Jazz, 1996)
- Let's Face the Music: The Songs of Irving Berlin (Concord Jazz, 1997)
- Someone to Watch Over Me: The Songs of George Gershwin (Concord Jazz, 1998)

With Pat Metheny

- Unity Band (Nonesuch, 2012)
- KIN (←→) (Nonesuch, 2014)
- The Unity Sessions (Nonesuch, 2016)

With Mingus Big Band

- Mingus Big Band 93 - Nostalgia in Times Square (Dreyfus, 1993)
- !Que Viva Mingus! (Dreyfus, 1997)

With Paul Motian

- Reincarnation of a Love Bird (JMT, 1994)
- Flight of the Blue Jay (Winter & Winter, 1997)
- Trio 2000 + One (Winter & Winter, 1998)
- Play Monk and Powell (Winter & Winter, 1999)
- On Broadway Vol. 4 or The Paradox of Continuity (Winter & Winter, 2006)
- Live at the Village Vanguard (Winter & Winter, 2006)
- Live at the Village Vanguard Vol. II (Winter & Winter, 2007)
- Live at the Village Vanguard Vol. III (Winter & Winter, 2008)
- Lost in a Dream with Jason Moran (ECM, 2010)

With John Patitucci

- One More Angel (Concord Jazz, 1997)
- Now (Concord Jazz, 1998)
- Imprint (Concord Jazz, 2000)
- Line by Line (Concord Jazz, 2006)
- Live in Italy (Concord Jazz, 2022)

With Adam Rogers

- Allegory (Criss Cross Jazz, 2003)
- Apparitions (Criss Cross Jazz, 2005)

With Renee Rosnes

- Ancestors (Blue Note, 1996)
- As We Are Now (Blue Note, 1997)
- Life on Earth (Blue Note, 2001)
- Beloved of the Sky (Smoke Sessions, 2018)

With Alex Sipiagin

- Images (TCB, 1998)
- Steppin' Zone (Criss Cross Jazz, 2001)
- Equilibrium (Criss Cross Jazz, 2004)
- Prints (Criss Cross Jazz, 2007)
- Destinations Unknown (Criss Cross Jazz, 2011)
- Overlooking Moments (Criss Cross Jazz, 2013)
- Moments Captured (Criss Cross Jazz, 2017)
- Horizons (Blue Room Music, 2024)

With Steely Dan

- Alive in America (Giant, 1995)
- Two Against Nature (Giant, 2000)
- Everything Must Go (Reprise, 2003)

With Steve Swallow

- Deconstructed (Xtra Watt, 1997)
- Always Pack Your Uniform on Top (Xtra Watt, 2000)
- Damaged in Transit (Xtra Watt, 2003)

With John Swana

- The Feeling's Mutual (Criss Cross Jazz, 1993)
- Tug of War (Criss Cross Jazz, 1999)

With Joris Teepe

- Seven Days a Week (VIA Jazz, 1998)
- For Adults Only (Postcards, 2000)

With others

- Red Rodney, Then and Now (Chesky, 1992)
- LaVerne Butler, No Looking Back (Chesky, 1993)
- Marian McPartland, In My Life (Concord Jazz, 1993)
- Peter Madsen, Snuggling Snakes (Minor Music, 1993)
- James Moody, Live at the Blue Note (Telarc, 1995)
- Randy Sandke, The Chase (Concord Jazz, 1995)
- Billy Drummond, Dubai (Criss Cross Jazz, 1996)
- Per Husby, If You Could See Me Now (Gemini 1996)
- Marlena Shaw, Dangerous (Concord Jazz, 1996)
- Ray Drummond, Vignettes (Arabesque, 1996)
- Karrin Allyson, Scott Hamilton, Concord Jazz Festival All-Stars, Fujitsu-Concord 27th Jazz Festival (Concord, 1996)
- Eden Atwood, A Night in the Life (Concord Jazz, 1996)
- Billy Hart, Oceans of Time (Arabesque, 1997)
- Ed Palermo Big Band, Plays the Music of Frank Zappa (Astor Place, 1997)
- The Seatbelts, Cowboy Bebop: Vitaminless (Victor, 1998)
- Jochen Rueckert, Introduction (Jazzline, 1998)
- Jim Hall, Jazzpar Quartet + 4 (Storyville, 1998)
- Allen Farnham, Meets the RIAS Big Band (Concord, 1998)
- Joanne Brackeen, Pink Elephant Magic (Arkadia Jazz, 1999)
- Sarah Jane Cion, Moon Song (Naxos, 2000)
- Antonio Farao, Thorn (Enja, 2000)
- John Fedchock, Hit the Bricks (Reservoir, 2000)
- Nnenna Freelon, Soulcall (Concord Jazz, 2000)
- Nguyen Le, Bakida (ACT, 2000)
- Mike Gibbs, Nonsequence (Provocateur, 2001)
- Larry Carlton, Deep Into It (Warner Bros., 2001)
- Rene Marie, Vertigo (MAXJAZZ, 2001)
- Joachim Kuhn, Universal Time (EmArcy, 2002)
- Kenny Rankin, A Song for You (Verve, 2002)
- Chuck Loeb, eBop (Shanachie, 2003)
- Josh Roseman, Treats for the Nightwalker (Enja, 2003)
- Lizz Wright, Salt (Verve, 2003)
- Wayne Shorter, Alegria (Verve, 2003)
- Mike Clark with Billy Childs and Chris Potter, Summertime (JazzKey, 2003)
- Jim Rotondi, New Vistas (Criss Cross Jazz, 2004)
- Enrico Pieranunzi, Paul Motian, with Chris Potter, Doorways (CAM Jazz, 2004)
- Kenny Wheeler, What Now? (CAM Jazz, 2005)
- Malene Mortensen, Malene (Stunt, 2006)
- Miles Okazaki, Mirror (2006)
- Mark Sholtez, Real Street (Verve, 2006)
- Kenny Werner, Lawn Chair Society (Blue Note, 2007)
- Luciana Souza, The New Bossa Nova (Verve, 2007)
- Mark Soskin, One Hopeful Day (Kind of Blue, 2007)
- Antonio Sánchez, Migration (CAM Jazz, 2007)
- Patricia Barber, The Cole Porter Mix (Blue Note 2008)
- Walter Becker, Circus Money (Mailboat, 2008)
- Ari Hoenig, Bert's Playground (Dreyfus, 2008)
- Joe Martin, Not by Chance (Anzic, 2009)
- Tim Ries, Live at Smalls (SmallsLIVE, 2010)
- Sophie Milman, In the Moonlight (eOne, 2011)
- Adam Cruz, Milestone (Sunnyside, 2011)
- Mike Stern, All Over the Place (Heads Up, 2012)
- Burak Bedikyan, Circle of Life (SteepleChase, 2013)
- Monika Borzym, My Place (Sony 2013)
- Eldar Djangirov, Breakthrough (Motema, 2013)
- John Escreet, Sabotage and Celebration (Whirlwind, 2013)
- Dave Stryker, Messin' with Mister T (Strikezone 2015)
- Scott Tixier, Cosmic Adventure (Sunnyside, 2016)
- Ben Patterson Jazz Orchestra Featuring Chris Potter, Vital Frequencies (Bonecat 2016)
- Mihaly Dresch with Chris Potter, Zea (Budapest Music Center, 2016)
- Joey Alexander, Countdown (Motema, 2016)
- Marek Napiorkowski, WAW-NYC (Wydawnictwo Agora, 2017)
- Nate Smith, Kinfolk: Postcards from Everywhere (Ropeadope, 2017)
- Randy Waldman, Super Heroes (BFM, 2018)
- James Francies, Flight (Blue Note, 2018)
- Jon Cowherd, Pride & Joy (Le Coq, 2022)
- Jim McNeely, hr-Bigband, Rituals (Double Moon, 2022)
