= Malta Jazz Festival =

Musical Event

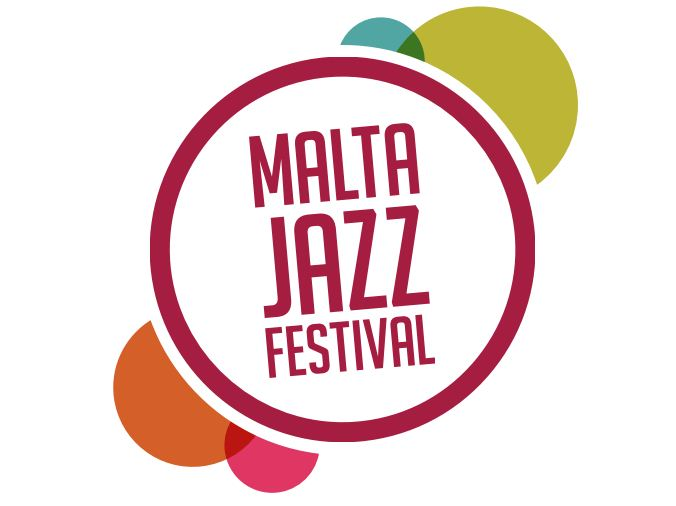
- Genre: Jazz
- Dates: mid-July
- Locations: Valletta, Malta
- Years active: 1990–present
- Website: festivals.mt/mjf

The Malta Jazz Festival is an annual musical event held every July in Malta, organised by Festivals Malta (previously part of Arts Council Malta and the Malta Council for Culture and the Arts). It is held outside Our Lady of Liesse Church, on the Valletta waterfront.

== History ==
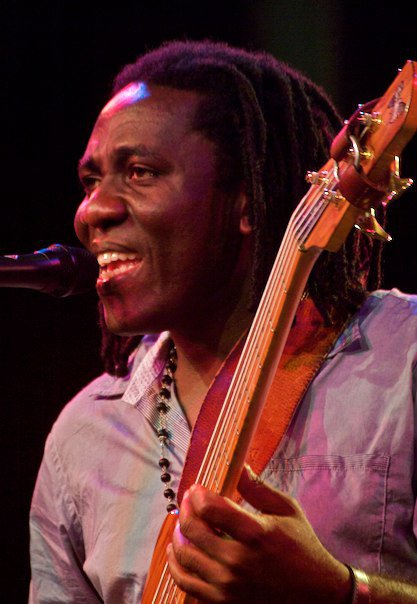
Richard Bona at the Malta Jazz Festival 2010.

The festival was established in 1990 by Charles 'City' Gatt and has featured world-renowned jazz musicians such as Wayne Shorter, Joe Zawinul, Elvin Jones, John Patitucci, Diana Krall, Chick Corea, Al Di Meola, Natalie Cole, Betty Carter, Richard Bona, Joe Henderson and Mike Stern.

In 2006, the event was controversially removed from the artistic directorship of Gatt, a pioneer of Maltese jazz, and placed in the hands of private promotion company N'n'G, who attempted to style it into a more populist 'Rock and Jazz' festival. Subsequent line-ups almost entirely bereft of contemporary jazz content and mainly featuring a host of passé rock musicians, reformed prog rock acts and tribute bands led the festival into a period of brief decline.

2009 saw the festival return to its roots under the directorship of Maltese musician Sandro Zerafa with a line-up of world-renowned jazz musicians.

Among the artists who performed at the 2010 festival were Bill Stewart, Ari Hoenig, Greg Hutchinson, Dave Weckl, Dave King, Mike Stern and Richard Bona. The 2011 festival featured Lionel Loueke, Joao Bosco, Monty Alexander and Avishai Cohen. The 2012 festival took place on July 19, 20 and 21 and included performances by Al Di Meola, Terri Lyne Carrington, Chano Dominguez, Tigran Hamasyan, Dianne Reeves, Jeremy Pelt and Will Vinson.

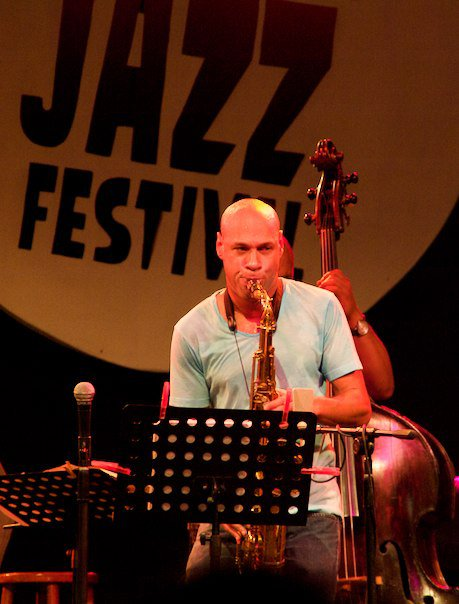
Joshua Redman performing at the 2010 Festival.

The 2013 festival was staged on July 18, 19 and 20, featuring the Robert Glasper Experiment, Vijay Iyer Trio, Gregory Porter, Michel Camilo Trio, Gilad Hekselman Quartet, Charles 'City' Gatt Vibraphone Quintet, Gerald Clayton Trio (featuring Logan Richardson), Cusp and Walter Vella Quartet.

Among the acts appearing at the 2014 festival were Warren Wolf, Tom Harrell (featuring Jaleel Shaw, Johnathan Blake, Esperanza Spalding, Wayne Escoffery and Ugonna Okegwo), Kneebody, Brecker Brothers Band Reunion (featuring Terry Bozzio), Laurent Coq's Dialogue Trio, Ada Rovatti, Barry Finnerty, Neil Jason, Brad Mehldau and Mark Guiliana. Mehldau and Guiliana performed as their synthesizer-oriented duo project "Mehliana". The festival took place between July 17 and 19.

The 2015 festival took place between July 16 and 19. Among the acts on stage were Danilo Perez, John Patitucci, Brian Blade, Dave Holland, Chris Potter, Lionel Loueke, Eric Harland, David Binney, Chucho Valdes, Kurt Elling, Soweto Kinch, Joe Cohn and Richard Bona.

For 2016, the festival moved away from Ta` Liesse for its opening night, which took place at Valletta's City Gate. Among the acts at the 2016 festival were headliner Mike Stern, Snarky Puppy, Omer Avital, Harold López-Nussa and pianist Marcus Roberts' trio. This 26th edition of the festival took place between July 21 and 23.

The 2017 festival was staged between July 20 and 22, featuring acts including Mark Guiliana, Al di Meola, Antonio Sanchez, Nicholas Payton and Munir Hossn. The 2018 Malta Jazz Festival was headlined by Chick Corea, John Patitucci and Dave Weckl. The festival took place between July 16 and 21.

The 2019 festival took place between July 15 and 20. Some of the main acts performing were Jazzmeia Horn, Kenny Garrett, Ozmosys (featuring Omar Hakim) and Chucho Valdés. The festival also featured local acts such as the William Smith Trio, Dominic Galea and Malta Concert Orchestra's Big Band together with Joe Cutajar. Due to the COVID-19 pandemic, the 2020 edition of the festival took place in a reduced format between July 13 and 18, including virtual masterclasses, an internet channel featuring rare broadcasts of concerts from the festival's archives and a virtual exhibition of photography.

The 2021 festival took place in a reduced 'City Jazz Series' format between July 12 and 17 with appearances from Danny Grissett, Chiara Pancadli and Darryl Hall, Yonathan Avishai, Felipe Cabrera 'Mirror' and Dmitry Baevsky

The 2022 edition of the festival took place between July 11 and 16. It featured, among others, Clark Tracey & Dominic Galea Legacy Quintet, The Blue Tangerine, Francesco Ciniglio “Locomotive Suite”, Yusan, Danny Grissett Trio, John Scofield’s “Yankee Go Home”, Warren Galea Trio, Joel Ross “Good Vibes”, Richard Bona & Alfredo Rodriguez and Daniele Cordisco quintet. The festival was dedicated to the memory of the event's founder, Charles 'City' Gatt, who died in February 2022.

The 2023 festival was staged between July 11 and 15, headlined by Samara Joy, Kurt Rosenwinkel Quartet, Kurt Elling featuring Charlie Hunter performing Superblue, Immanuel Wilkins, The New York Blue Note Quintet and Raynald Colom Quintent.

The 2024 festival took place between July 8 and 13, headlined by Chief Adjuah, Walter Smith III Quintent, Something Else!, Trio Grande, Monica Solmaso and Tom Ollendorff Trio.

In 2025, the festival was held between July 7 and 12 and featured Lukmil Pérez Quartet, Franck Amsallem Trio, Rebecca Martin, Larry Grenadier & Bill McHenry, Knower, Viktorija Gečytė and Daniel Gassin, Richard Sears Trio, Paul Giordimaina SFERA, Peter Bernstein Quartet, Michael Mayo, Glen Montanaro Trio, and Johnathan Blake.

== Lineups ==
Edition	Year	Dates	Notable Acts
1	1990		Chick Corea, Michael Petrucciani, Elvin Jones
2	1991	26-28 July	Elvin Jones's Jazz Machine, Robin Jones, Alexei Kuznetzov, Chick Corea with John Patitucci and Dave Weckl, Esmond Selwyn Trio
3	1992		John Patitucci
4	1993		Al Di Meola
5	1994		Betty Carter, Jack Dejohnette, Bill Evans, Joe Henderson, Mike Stern, Joe Zawinul
6	1995		Paul Motian
7	1996		Mro Paul Abela with Alex Debono, Coco York
8	1997		Dave Weckl, Mike Stern
9	1998	17-19 July	Michael Brecker Group, Dave Holland Group, Diana Krall Trio, Bob Berg Band, Lee Konitz, Paul Bley
10	1999	16-18 July	Herbie Hancock's Gershwin's World, Carla Bley 4 + 4, Gabrielle Comeglio + Cinda Jazz Funk, Larry Coryell's Eleventh House, Bill Frisell Band, Tommy Smith Group, Mike Manieri + Steps Ahead, Johann S. Big Band, Lucky Peterson's Blues Band
11	2000		Joao Bosco and the Yellowjackets, Joe Zawinul
12	2001	20-22 July	Charlie Haden
13	2002		Arto Tuncboyaciyan
14	2003	18-20 July	Calexico, Mint Royale, Wayne Shorter, Roberto Juan Rodríguez featuring David Krakauer, Diane Reeves, Tania Maria, Sandro Zerafa Quartet
15	2004	16–18 July	Joao Bosco and the Yellowjackets, Geri Allen, The Souldbop Band
16	2005	15–17 July	Maria João, Greg Osby, John Zorn, Richard Galliano, Rosa Passos, Brian Blade and Dino Saluzzi
17	2006	21–23 July	The Original Blues Brothers Band, Emily Bezar, Alan Parsons
17	2007	19–22 July	Zucchero, The Wailers, Australian Pink Floyd, Nina Ferro, PP Arnold, Dr Robert
18	2008	15–17 July	Sierra Maestra, Ray Wilson, Curved Air
19	2009	16–18 July	Brad Mehldau, the Oliver Degabriele Trio, the Kurt Rosenwinkel Band, Eliane Elias, the John Scofield Piety Street Band, Miguel Zenon Quartet
20	2010	15-17 July	Bill Stewart, Ari Hoenig, Greg Hutchinson, Dave Weckl, Dave King, Mike Stern, Richard Bona
21	2011	14–16 July	Lionel Loueke, Joao Bosco, Monty Alexander and Avishai Cohen
22	2012	19–21 July	Al Di Meola, Terri Lyne Carrington, Chano Dominguez, Tigran Hamasyan, Dianne Reeves, Jeremy Pelt and Will Vinson
23	2013	18–20 July	Robert Glasper Experiment, Vijay Iyer Trio, Gregory Porter, Michel Camilo Trio, Gilad Hekselman Quartet, Gerald Clayton Trio (featuring Logan Richardson), Charles 'City' Gatt Vibraphone Quintet
24	2014	17–19 July	Warren Wolf, Tom Harrell, Kneebody, Brecker Brothers Band Reunion (featuring Terry Bozzio), Laurent Coq's Dialogue Trio, Ada Rovatti, Barry Finnerty, Neil Jason, Brad Mehldau and Mark Guiliana
25	2015	16–19 July	Danilo Perez, John Patitucci, Brian Blade, Dave Holland, Chris Potter, Lionel Loueke, Eric Harland, David Binney, Chucho Valdes, Kurt Elling, Soweto Kinch, Joe Cohn and Richard Bona
26	2016	21–23 July	Mike Stern, Snarky Puppy, Omer Avital, Harold López-Nussa, Marcus Roberts trio
27	2017	20–22 July	Mark Guiliana, Al di Meola, Antonio Sánchez, Nicholas Payton, Munir Hossn
28	2018	16–21 July	Chick Corea, John Patitucci, Dave Weckl
29	2019	15–20 July	Jazzmeia Horn, Kenny Garrett, Ozmosys (featuring Omar Hakim) and Chucho Valdés, the William Smith Trio
30	2020	13–18 July	Main performances cancelled due to the COVID-19 pandemic.
31	2021	12–17 July	Danny Grissett, Chiara Pancadli and Darryl Hall, Yonathan Avishai, Felipe Cabrera 'Mirror' and Dmitry Baevsky
32	2022	11–16 July	Clark Tracey & Dominic Galea Legacy Quintet, The Blue Tangerine, Francesco Ciniglio “Locomotive Suite”, Yusan, Danny Grissett Trio, John Scofield’s “Yankee Go Home”, Warren Galea Trio, Joel Ross “Good Vibes”, Richard Bona & Alfredo Rodriguez and Daniele Cordisco Quintet
33	2023	10–15 July	Samara Joy, Kurt Rosenwinkel Quartet, Kurt Elling featuring Charlie Hunter performing Superblue, Immanuel Wilkins, The New York Blue Note Quintet and Raynald Colom Quintent
34	2024	8–13 July	Chief Adjuah, Walter Smith III Quintent, Something Else!, Trio Grande, Monica Solmaso and Tom Ollendorff Trio
35	2025	7–12 July	Lukmil Pérez Quartet, Franck Amsallem Trio, Rebecca Martin, Larry Grenadier & Bill McHenry, Knower, Viktorija Gečytė and Daniel Gassin, Richard Sears Trio, Paul Giordimaina SFERA, Peter Bernstein Quartet, Michael Mayo, Glen Montanaro Trio, and Johnathan Blake
36	2026	6–11 July	Toninho Horta with Mathias Allamane, Seamus Blake, and Jeff Ballard, Ghost-Note
