= The Time of the Sun =

Studio album by Tom Harrell
- Released: May 31, 2011
- Recorded: December 1, 2010
- Genre: Post bop
- Length: 1:02:12
- Label: High Note
- Producer: Tom Harrell, Wayne Escoffery, Angela Harrell

Tom Harrell chronology
Roman Nights (2010)	The Time of the Sun (2011)	Number Five (2012)

Professional ratings
Review scores
Source	Rating
AllMusic	4/5 stars

The Time of the Sun is an album by jazz trumpeter, composer and arranger, Tom Harrell, that was released in May 2011 by HighNote Records. It is the fourth album by Harrell's 2011-quintet of over six years, which includes Wayne Escoffery, Danny Grissett, Ugonna Okegwo and Johnathan Blake. The other albums by this group are Roman Nights, Prana Dance, and Light On. As with most of his album releases, Harrell composed all the tracks on this album. The title track is notable for the use of sounds produced by the magnetic field in the outer atmosphere of the Sun, recorded by the astronomers at the University of Sheffield and Stanford University. Harrell received his sixth SESAC Jazz Award for this album, which topped the radio charts in the United States.

== Track listing ==
All songs by Tom Harrell.

No.	Title	Length
1.	"The Time of the Sun"	5:57
2.	"Estuary"	8:41
3.	"Ridin'"	9:02
4.	"The Open Door"	6:33
5.	"Dream Text"	7:28
6.	"Modern Life"	7:10
7.	"River Samba"	5:04
8.	"Cactus"	6:28
9.	"Otra"	5:49

== Personnel ==
Credits adapted from AllMusic.

- Tom Harrell – composer, primary artist, producer, flugelhorn, trumpet
- Johnathan Blake – drums
- Wayne Escoffery – producer, sax (tenor)
- Danny Grissett – fender rhodes, piano
- Ugonna Okegwo – bass
- Angela Harrell – producer
- Joe Fields – executive producer
- Mike Marciano – engineer
- Keiji Obata – design
- Salvatore Corso – photography
- Ted Panken – liner notes
