= Matt Slocum (drummer) =

American jazz musician

Matt Slocum (born July 18, 1981, in New Richmond, Wisconsin) is an American jazz drummer and composer. He has released four recordings as a bandleader: Portraits, After the Storm, Black Elk's Dream, and Trio Pacific Vol. 1. Slocum is the recipient of composition grants and commissions from New Music USA, the Mid Atlantic Arts Foundation, the New Jersey State Council on the Arts, the American Music Center, the Puffin Foundation, and Meet the Composer.

Slocum was born in New Richmond, Wisconsin, on the east side of the Twin Cities. In high school he studied with Phil Hey. At USC’s Thornton School of Music Slocum studied with Peter Erskine, Alan Pasqua, John Clayton and Joe LaBarbera. After graduating USC, Slocum spent three years in Pasadena. In 2007 he moved to the East Coast.

Slocum toured with vocal artist Sarah Gazarek for three years and has performed and/or recorded with Seamus Blake, Alan Broadbent, Steve Cardenas, Gerald Clayton, Danny Grissett, Larry Koonse, Lage Lund, Wynton Marsalis, Linda Oh, Alan Pasqua, Jerome Sabbagh, Jaleel Shaw, Walter Smith III, Dayna Stephens, Ben Wendel, Gerald Wiggins, Anthony Wilson and the Dallas Symphony Orchestra.

Slocum named his influences on composing: Billy Strayhorn, Duke Ellington, Wayne Shorter, Tom Harrell, Dave Holland, Alan Pasqua, as well as Debussy and Ravel; and for drumming: Roy Haynes, Elvin Jones, and Max Roach, as well as Bill Stewart, Eric Harland, Matt Wilson, Kendrick Scott, and Marcus Gilmore.

Slocum currently lives in Montclair, New Jersey.
