= Roman Nights =

Studio album by Tom Harrell
- Released: March 23, 2010
- Recorded: November 27, 2009
- Genre: Post bop
- Length: 1:02:34
- Label: High Note
- Producer: Tom Harrell, Wayne Escoffery, Angela Harrell

Tom Harrell chronology
Prana Dance (2009)	Roman Nights (2010)	The Time of the Sun (2011)

Professional ratings
Review scores
Source	Rating
AllMusic	4/5 stars

Roman Nights is a 2010 album by jazz trumpeter, composer and arranger, Tom Harrell. It is the third release with Harrell's 2010-quintet of over five years, which includes Wayne Escoffery, Danny Grissett, Ugonna Okegwo and Johnathan Blake. The album contains nine original compositions by Harrell. The title track is a flugelhorn-piano duet performance by Harrell and Grissett.

The album reached number one on the U.S. jazz radio chart in May 2010 and was included in top album lists of the year by various critics.

== Track listing ==
All songs by Tom Harrell.

No.	Title	Length
1.	"Storm Approaching"	5:13
2.	"Let the Children Play"	6:46
3.	"Roman Nights"	7:53
4.	"Study in Sound"	7:35
5.	"Agua"	5:26
6.	"Obsession"	6:02
7.	"Harvest Song"	8:22
8.	"Bird in Flight"	9:19
9.	"Year of the Ox"	5:58

== Personnel ==
Credits adapted from AllMusic.

- Tom Harrell – composer, primary artist, producer, flugelhorn, trumpet
- Wayne Escoffery – producer, sax (tenor)
- Danny Grissett – piano, fender rhodes
- Ugonna Okegwo – bass
- Johnathan Blake – drums
- Angela Harrell – producer
- Joe Fields – executive producer
- Dave Kowalski – engineer
- Keiji Obata – design
- Doug Ramsey – liner notes
- Francesco Truono – photography
