= Colors of a Dream =

Studio album by Tom Harrell
- Released: October 22, 2013
- Recorded: April 2–3, 2013
- Genre: Post bop
- Length: 1:04:51
- Label: High Note
- Producer: Tom Harrell, Angela Harrell

Tom Harrell chronology
Number Five (2012)	Colors of a Dream (2013)	Trip (2014)

Colors of a Dream is the sixth HighNote Records album by trumpeter-composer Tom Harrell, featuring two basses played by Ugonna Okegwo and Esperanza Spalding, with the latter doubling on vocal, Jaleel Shaw on alto saxophone, Wayne Escoffery on tenor saxophone, and Johnathan Blake on drums. The album was released on October 22, 2013, and the sextet is expected to tour in the summer of 2014.

According to JazzTimes, this album deviates from Harrell's previous works. The use of piano is absent, and the three horns often play in block-chord formation. There are hints of Latin jazz, R&B and indie-rock. According to the review, "Colors of a Dream may deviate, but it never disappoints." Down Beat magazine si"milarly noted the lack of piano, stating that the addition of Shaw on sax and Spalding on bass results in an "opaque and varied" soundscape. In March 2013, the group performed this work at the Village Vanguard which was broadcast live by NPR Music.

== Track listing ==
All songs by Tom Harrell.

No.	Title	Length
1.	"Tango"	6:26
2.	"Velejar"	7:01
3.	"Phantasy in Latin"	6:19
4.	"State"	5:06
5.	"Seventy"	3:18
6.	"Blues 2013"	9:01
7.	"Nite Life"	5:16
8.	"Even If"	4:58
9.	"Walkway"	6:43
10.	"Family"	4:18
11.	"Goin' Out"	6:25

== Personnel ==
Credits adapted from AllMusic.

- Tom Harrell – composer, producer, primary artist, trumpet, flugelhorn
- Esperanza Spalding – bass, vocals
- Wayne Escoffery – sax (tenor)
- Jaleel Shaw – sax (alto)
- Ugonna Okegwo – bass
- Johnathan Blake – drums
- Fleurine Elizabeth Verloop – composer, lyricist
- Lilian Vieira – composer, lyricist
- John Davis – engineer
- Dave Darlington – mastering, mixing
- Joe Fields – executive producer
- Angela Harrell – producer, photography
- Keiji Obata – design
- Tom Schnabel – liner notes
