= Number Five (album) =

Studio album by Tom Harrell
- Released: May 22, 2012
- Recorded: December 30, 2011
- Genre: Post bop
- Length: 59:07
- Label: High Note
- Producer: Tom Harrell, Wayne Escoffery, Angela Harrell

Tom Harrell chronology
| The Time of the Sun (2011) | Number Five (2012) | Colors of a Dream (2013) |

Professional ratings
Review scores
| Source | Rating |
|---|---|
| AllMusic | 4/5 stars |

Number Five is a studio album by jazz trumpeter, composer, and arranger, Tom Harrell, released in May 2012 by HighNote.

== Overview ==
This is the fifth album by Harrell's Quintet, which includes Wayne Escoffery on sax, Danny Grissett on piano, Ugonna Okegwo on bass, and Johnathan Blake on drums. Four tracks feature the full quintet. The other tracks feature arrangements in quartet, trio and duo, and on two tracks Harrell performs solo. This is a departure from Harrell's previous four albums, in which 35 of the total 36 tracks featured the full quintet. Four tracks were recorded with no prior rehearsal – exhibiting the confidence and tightness of the group.

== Reception ==
JazzTimes noted the group's chemistry and called the album "the most adventurous and eclectic of the five he's done for HighNote." AllMusic stated that Harrell "continues to surprise" with this album.

== Track listing ==
| No. | Title | Writer(s) | Length |
|---|---|---|---|
| 1. | "Blue 'n' Boogie" | Dizzy Gillespie, Frank Paparelli | 4:20 |
| 2. | "Right as Rain" | Tom Harrell | 3:20 |
| 3. | "No. 5" | Tom Harrell | 8:24 |
| 4. | "Journey to the Stars" | Tom Harrell | 6:34 |
| 5. | "GT" | Tom Harrell | 8:55 |
| 6. | "Present" | Tom Harrell | 6:44 |
| 7. | "Star Eyes" | Gene de Paul | 5:28 |
| 8. | "Preludium" | Tom Harrell | 4:07 |
| 9. | "The Question" | Tom Harrell | 3:09 |
| 10. | "Melody in B-Flat" | Tom Harrell | 4:06 |
| 11. | "A Blue Time" | Tadd Dameron | 4:00 |

== Personnel ==
Credits adapted from AllMusic.

- Tom Harrell – composer, primary artist, producer, flugelhorn, trumpet
- Wayne Escoffery – producer, sax (tenor)
- Danny Grissett – piano, fender rhodes
- Ugonna Okegwo – bass
- Johnathan Blake – drums
- Tadd Dameron – composer
- Gene De Paul – composer
- Frank Paparelli – composer
- Joe Fields – executive producer
- Angela Harrell – producer
- Rich Lamb – assistant engineer
- Mike Marciano – engineer
- Salvatore Corso – photography
- John Kelman – liner notes
- Keiji Obata – design
