= Light On (album) =

Studio album by Tom Harrell
- Released: June 26, 2007
- Recorded: December 5 and 7, 2006
- Studio: Van Gelder Studio, Englewood Cliffs, NJ
- Genre: Jazz, post-bop
- Length: 1:05:46
- Label: HighNote
- Producer: Don Sickler

Tom Harrell chronology
Humanity (2007)	Light On (2007)	Prana Dance (2009)

Professional ratings
Review scores
Source	Rating
AllMusic	4/5 stars
The Penguin Guide to Jazz Recordings	4/4 stars

Light On is a jazz album by trumpeter-composer Tom Harrell released in 2007 through HighNote Records. This is the first album recorded by Harrell's then recent quintet. The group went on to release five albums between 2007 and 2012 and forms the core of a sixth album released in 2013. The group consists of Wayne Escoffery on sax, Danny Grissett on piano, Ugonna Okegwo on bass, and Johnathan Blake on drums. In 2007, the album topped the U.S. jazz radio chart and received a SESAC jazz award in the following year.

== Reception ==
In reviewing the album for AllMusic, jazz commentator Scott Yanow wrote, "Light On is a superior set of modern jazz". All About Jazz praised the group's cohesiveness and balance, and in particular noted Escoffery's delivery. Similarly JazzTimes called the quintet's delivery "immaculate".

== Track listing ==
All music is composed by Tom Harrell.

No.	Title	Length
1.	"Va"	7:48
2.	"Sky Life"	8:17
3.	"Contrary Mary"	9:11
4.	"Fountain"	4:19
5.	"Nights at Catalonia"	7:20
6.	"The Gronk"	5:56
7.	"Architect of Time"	5:03
8.	"Bad Stuff"	7:39
9.	"Blue Caribe"	6:17
10.	"Va (Reprise)"	3:56

== Notable personnel ==
Credits adapted from AllMusic.

Performers

- Tom Harrell – flugelhorn, trumpet
- Wayne Escoffery – tenor saxophone
- Danny Grissett – piano, Fender Rhodes
- Ugonna Okegwo – bass
- Johnathan Blake – drums

Production

- Don Sickler – producer
- Joe Fields – executive producer
- Rudy Van Gelder – engineer, mastering, mixing
