= Prana Dance =

Studio album by Tom Harrell
- Released: January 27, 2009
- Recorded: May 29 and June 10, 2008
- Genre: Post bop
- Length: 56:20
- Label: High Note
- Producer: Tom Harrell, Wayne Escoffery, Angela Harrell, Joe Fields

Tom Harrell chronology
Light On (2007)	Prana Dance (2009)	Roman Nights (2010)

Professional ratings
Review scores
Source	Rating
AllMusic	4/5 stars
All About Jazz	4.5/5 stars
Down Beat	4.5/5 stars

Prana Dance is a studio album by American jazz musician Tom Harrell, released on January 27, 2009, by HighNote Records and recorded on May 29, 2008, and June 10, 2008. Down Beat magazine praised the album stating that it "signals a new career high" and added, "Music that operates at this level of structural, emotional and psychic integration is rare."

== Track listing ==
All songs by Tom Harrell.

No.	Title	Length
1.	"Marching"	5:55
2.	"Prana"	7:30
3.	"Sequenza"	8:26
4.	"Maharaja"	5:19
5.	"The Call"	7:52
6.	"Ride"	7:00
7.	"The Sea Serpent"	6:07
8.	"In the Infinite"	8:11

== Personnel ==
Credits adapted from AllMusic.

- Tom Harrell – trumpet, flugelhorn, producer
- Wayne Escoffery – soprano and tenor saxophones, producer
- Danny Grissett – piano, Fender Rhodes
- Ugonna Okegwo – bass
- Johnathan Blake – drums
- Joe Fields – executive producer
- Angela Harrell – producer
- Dave Kowalski – engineer
- Neil Tesse – liner notes
