= Live at the Village Vanguard (Tom Harrell album) =

Live album by Tom Harrell
- Released: May 7, 2002
- Recorded: November 15–18, 2001
- Genre: Jazz
- Length: 1:10:06
- Label: Bluebird RCA / Bluebird
- Producer: Tom Harrell

Tom Harrell chronology
Paradise (2001)	Live at the Village Vanguard (2002)	Wise Children (2003)

Professional ratings
Review scores
Source	Rating
AllMusic	4/5 stars
Entertainment Weekly	A−
The Penguin Guide to Jazz Recordings	3.5/4 stars

Live at the Village Vanguard is a Tom Harrell album recorded for RCA with Harrell's then quintet and released in 2002. The band included Jimmy Greene on tenor sax, Ugonna Okegwo on bass, Xavier Davis on piano and Quincy Davis on drums. This is Harrell's first live album. A JazzTimes review called the album "a worthy addition to the library of recordings made at the Vanguard". With the exception of the 1940 standard "Everything Happens to Me", the album consists of mostly new compositions.

== Track listing ==
No.	Title	Writer(s)	Length
1.	"Asia Minor"	Tom Harrell	8:43
2.	"Manhattan, 3 A.M."	Tom Harrell	3:07
3.	"Where the Rain Begins"	Angela Harrell, Tom Harrell	6:18
4.	"Blues in Una Sea"	Tom Harrell	11:39
5.	"A Child's Dream"	Tom Harrell	9:24
6.	"Design"	Tom Harrell	8:46
7.	"Everything Happens to Me"	Matt Dennis, Tom Adair	9:29
8.	"Party Song"	Tom Harrell	12:40

== Personnel ==
Credits adapted from AllMusic.

- Tom Harrell – trumpet
- Jimmy Greene – tenor saxophone
- Xavier Davis – piano
- Ugonna Okegwo – bass
- Quincy Davis – drums
