= Danny Grissett =

American jazz pianist and composer (born 1975)

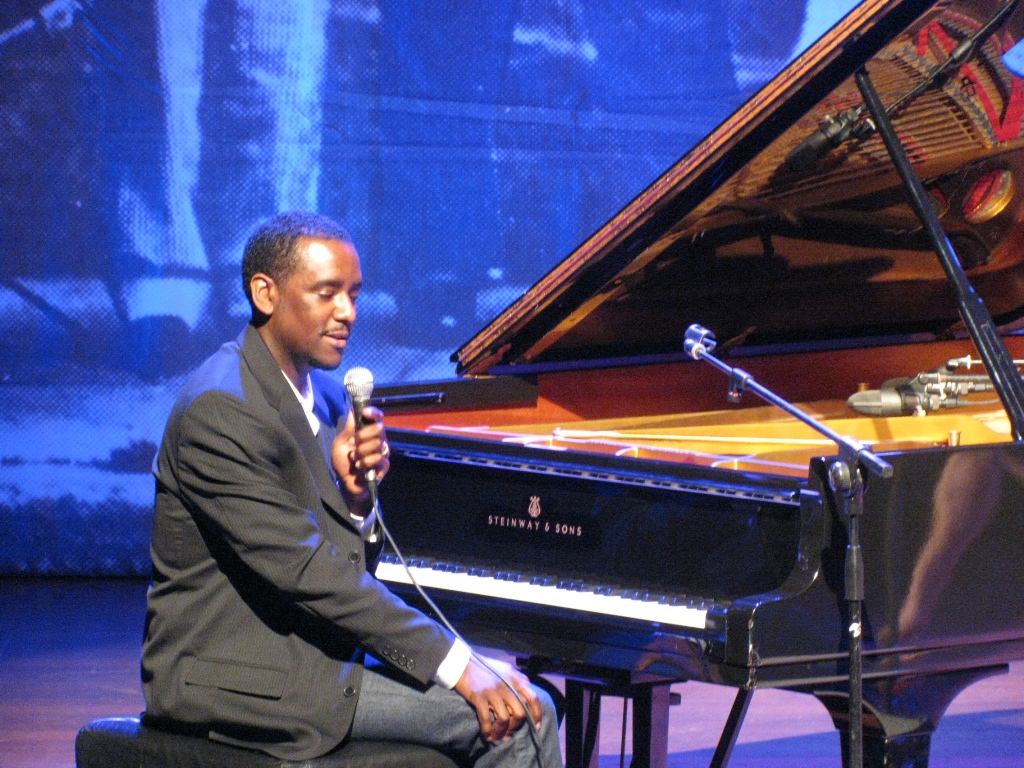
- Grissett in 2010

Background information
- Born: 1975 (age 50–51); Los Angeles, California, U.S.
- Genres: Jazz
- Occupations: Musician, composer
- Instruments: Piano, Fender Rhodes
- Years active: Early 2000s–present
- Label: Criss Cross
- Website: dannygrissett.com

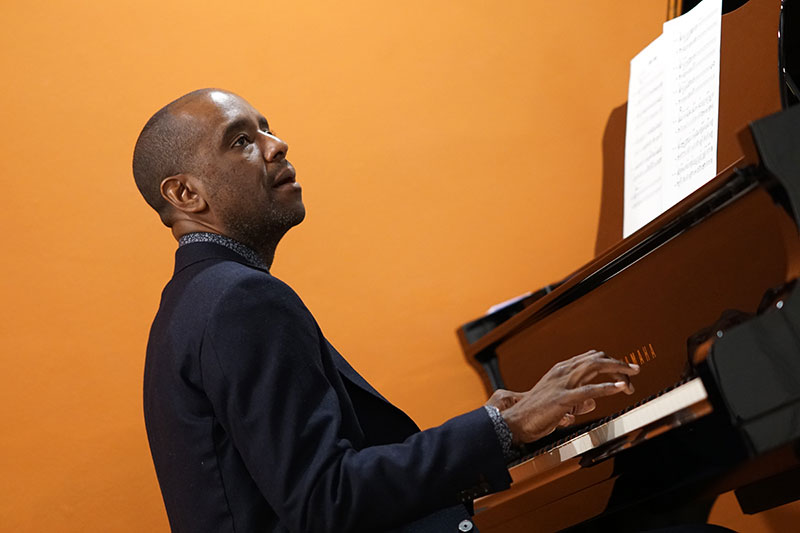
Danny Grissett (2018) in Aarhus, Denmark

Danny Grissett (born 1975) is an American jazz pianist, keyboardist, and composer.

== Early life ==
Grissett was born in Los Angeles in 1975. He first played the piano at the age of five, taking classical music lessons. He graduated with a B.A. in Music Education from California State University, Dominguez Hills, then completed a two-year master's degree in jazz performance in 2000 at the California Institute of the Arts followed by studies at the Thelonious Monk Institute at the University of Southern California Thornton School of Music.

== Later life and career ==
After playing around Los Angeles he moved to New York City in 2003. He became trumpeter Nicholas Payton's keyboardist early the following year, and has been a regular member of trumpeter Tom Harrell's band since 2005. Grissett released his first album as a leader in 2006, on the Criss Cross label, for whom he has continued to record. Promise and his following album, Encounters, were trio recordings with Vicente Archer (bass) and Kendrick Scott (drums). His next album, Form, from 2008, added saxophonist Seamus Blake, trumpeter Ambrose Akinmusire, and trombonist Steve Davis to the trio.

== Playing style ==
A Down Beat reviewer in 2010 commented that Grissett employed "strategies drawn from Mulgrew Miller, Herbie Hancock and Sonny Clark to tell cogent stories that carry his own harmonic and rhythmic signature."

== Discography ==
An asterisk (*) indicates that the year is that of release.

=== As leader/co-leader ===
| Year recorded | Title | Label | Personnel/Notes |
|---|---|---|---|
| 2005 | Promise | Criss Cross | Trio, with Vicente Archer (bass), Kendrick Scott (drums) |
| 2007 | Encounters | Criss Cross | Trio, with Vicente Archer (bass), Kendrick Scott (drums) |
| 2008 | Form | Criss Cross | Sextet, with Ambrose Akinmusire (trumpet), Steve Davis (trombone), Seamus Blake (tenor sax), Vicente Archer (bass), Kendrick Scott (drums) |
| 2011 | Stride | Criss Cross | Trio, with Vicente Archer (bass), Marcus Gilmore (drums) |
| 2015 | The In-Between | Criss Cross | Quartet, with Walter Smith III (tenor sax), Vicente Archer (bass), Bill Stewart (drums) |
| 2017? | Remembrance | Savant | Quartet, with Dayna Stephens (tenor sax, soprano sax), Vicente Archer (bass), Bill Stewart (drums) |

=== As sideman ===
| Year recorded | Leader | Title | Label |
|---|---|---|---|
| 2003 | Vincent Herring | Mr. Wizard | HighNote |
| 2006 | Vincent Herring | Ends and Means | HighNote |
| 2006 | Jimmy Greene | Gifts and Givers | Criss Cross |
| 2006 | Tom Harrell | Light On | HighNote |
| 2006* | Anne Mette Iversen | This Is My House | Okapi |
| 2007 | Jeremy Pelt | November | Max Jazz |
| 2007 | Lage Lund | Early Songs | Criss Cross |
| 2007 | Kiyoshi Kitagawa | I'm Still Here | Atelier Sawano |
| 2008 | Kengo Nakamura | Generations | 55 |
| 2008 | Tom Harrell | Prana Dance | HighNote |
| 2008* | Anne Mette Iversen | Best of the West | Brooklyn Jazz Underground |
| 2009 | Tom Harrell | Roman Nights | HighNote |
| 2009 | Jeremy Pelt | Men of Honor | HighNote |
| 2010 | Jeremy Pelt | The Talented Mr. Pelt | HighNote |
| 2010 | Tom Harrell | The Time of the Sun | HighNote |
| 2011 | Tom Harrell | Number Five | HighNote |
| 2011 | Jeremy Pelt | Soul | HighNote |
| 2011* | Anne Mette Iversen | Milo Songs | Brooklyn Jazz Underground |
| 2011* | Ozan Musluoğlu | 40th Day | Equinox Music & Entertainment |
| 2012* | Laïka Fatien | Come a Little Closer | Universal |
| 2014* | Anne Mette Iversen | So Many Roads | Brooklyn Jazz Underground |
| 2014* | Tom Guarna | Rush | Brooklyn Jazz Underground |
| 2015* | Tom Harrell | First Impressions | HighNote |
| 2015* | Ferit Odman | Dameronia With Strings | Equinox Music & Entertainment |
| 2016* | Jeremy Pelt | #Jiveculture | HighNote |
| 2016* | Anne Mette Iversen | Round Trip | Brooklyn Jazz Underground |
| 2016* | Rale Micic | Night Music | Whaling City Sound |
| 2017* | Tom Harrell | Moving Picture | HighNote |
| 2018* | Pee Wee Ellis | In My Ellingtonian Mood | Minor Music |
| 2019* | Raynald Colom | The Barcelona Sessions | Fresh Sound New Talent |
