= Rale Micic =

Serbian jazz guitarist and composer (born 1975)

Rale Mićić
- Born: 9 October 1975 (age 51); Belgrade, Serbia
- Genre: Jazz
- Occupation: Musician
- Instrument: Guitar
- Years active: 1999–present
- Website: www.ralemicic.com

Rale Mićić (Serbian Cyrillic: Рале Mићић; born 9 October 1975) is a Serbian jazz guitarist and composer.

Micic moved to United States in 1995 after receiving a scholarship from the Berklee College of Music, where he studied with George Garzone, John Thomas, and Bob Brookmeyer. It was also by that time that Mick Goodrick, became his mentor.

In 2000, Micic moved to New York City. His debut album, Bridges (CTA, 2003), mixed jazz with Balkan music. His second album, Serbia, featured jazz trumpeter Tom Harrell.

In 2010 Micic started a guitar duo series called Guitar x2. During the next decade, many prominent jazz guitarist performed as a part of the duo series, including Peter Bernstein, Gene Bertoncini, Ed Cherry, Jack Wilkins, Lage Lund, Mike Moreno, and many more.

== Discography ==
=== As leader ===
- Bridges (CTA, 2003)
- Serbia (CTA, 2006)
- 3 (CTA, 2010)
- Night Music (Whaling City Sound, 2016)
- Only Love Will Stay (Whaling City Sound, 2021)

=== As co-leader ===
- Inspired (ArtistShare, 2016) with John Abercrombie, Peter Bernstein, and Lage Lund

=== As sideman ===
With Tom Harrell

- First Impressions (High Note, 2015)

With The Heavy Hitters

- The Heavy Hitters (Cellar Music, 2023)

With Alma Micic

- You're My Thrill (Venus Records, 2024)
