= Infinity (Tom Harrell album) =

Studio album by Tom Harrell
- Released: March 8, 2019
- Recorded: September 24 & 30, 2018
- Venue: Sear Sound, New York City
- Genre: Jazz
- Length: 65:58
- Label: HighNote
- Producer: Angela Harrell, Tom Harrell

Tom Harrell chronology
Moving Picture (2017)	Infinity (2019)

Infinity is a studio album by jazz trumpeter Tom Harrell, released by HighNote Records in March 2019.

== Reception ==
Professional ratings
Review scores
Source	Rating
DownBeat	4/5 stars
Jazz Journal	5/5 stars
Jazzwise	3/5 stars

At DownBeat magazine, Suzanne Lorge highlighted Harrell's sense of form as a composer and improvisation as a musician as two positive aspects. The playing of the sidemen "flows holistically from his writing, with only the slightest of shifts between the composed and improvised sections. These natural transitions speak to a solid group rapport, where the soloists have a stake in the compositional act."

At JazzTimes, David Whiteis wrote, "Harrell sounds both delighted by his musical quest and enraptured by what he discovers. ... [Harrell's] muted trumpet skips with precision, dexterity, and brio, his solos so logically constructed that one could almost believe he's able to fully imagine each note, each run, each statement in its entirety before playing it."

In Jazz Journal, Andy Hamilton gave the album five stars.

== Track listing ==
All compositions by Tom Harrell

1. "The Fast" – 6:38
2. "Dublin" – 9:40
3. "Hope" – 7:30
4. "Coronation" – 6:56
5. "Folk Song" – 6:03
6. "Blue" – 5:40
7. "Ground" – 7:18
8. "The Isle" – 8:25
9. "Duet" – 1:41
10. "Taurus" – 6:01

== Personnel ==
- Tom Harrell – trumpet, flugelhorn
- Mark Turner – tenor saxophone
- Charles Altura – electric guitar, acoustic guitar
- Ben Street – bass
- Johnathan Blake – drums
- Adam Cruz – percussion
