= Frank Herzberg Trio =

Brazilian jazz trio

- Origin: São Paulo, Brazil
- Genres: Jazz, Latin jazz
- Years active: 2004–present
- Label: FHStudio
- Members: Frank Herzberg (bass); Zé Eduardo Nazario (drums); Alexandre Zamith (piano)
- Website: www.frankherzberg.com

The Frank Herzberg Trio is a contemporary Brazilian jazz trio that consists of bassist Frank Herzberg, drummer Zé Eduardo Nazario, and pianist Alexandre Zamith. Their style of jazz is contemporary with latin jazz influences. They released their debut album, Handmade, on October 11, 2011.

== History ==
Bassist Frank Herzberg was born in East Berlin, the capital of former East Germany. In 1990, he began studying double bass at the Hanns Eisler Music Conservatory. While attending the conservatory, Frank won a scholarship to attend Berklee College of Music in Boston, Massachusetts, where he graduated with a Bachelor of Music in Jazz Composition and Performance. While at Berklee, he studied under late jazz pianist Charlie Banacos and trombonist Hal Crook. After returning to Berlin to finish his studies, he moved to São Paulo, Brazil, where he has lived since. After several years, Herzberg met and developed a relationship with Brazilian drummer Zé Eduardo Nazário and Brazilian pianist Alexandre Zamith, and the Frank Herzberg Trio was formed

Drummer Zé Eduardo Nazario was born and raised in Brazil. He began studying classical piano at age 8, but became interested in the drums and got his first drum set when he was 12. Throughout his career as a drummer and a drum teacher, he has been involved in a multitude of jazz groups both in Brazil and abroad, including performing and recording with American jazz guitarist John Stein and Brazilian composer & multi-instrumentalist Hermeto Pascoal.

Pianist Alexandre Zamith holds a Doctorate in Classical Performance, and musically combines elements of his classical education with jazz piano improvisation.

== Handmade ==
In 2011, the trio recorded and released their debut album, Handmade. Stylistically, the album is a contemporary jazz trio format but with significant Brazilian and Latin influences. Dan Bilawski of All About Jazz stated that it is "a jazz album born in Brazil, rather than a Brazilian jazz album."

The album was generally well received, with Matt Warnock of Guitar International stating that "the grooves are energetic" and "the improvisations [are] conversational and melodic. An All About Jazz review noted that Herzberg "carefully crafts and molds his musical thought patterns and ideas into one-of-a-kind compositions."

In May 2012, radio publicity companies AirPlay Direct and Powderfinger Productions announced that the Frank Herzberg Trio won their Jazz Radio Promotion Contest, which will result in a national radio campaign for the music on Handmade and for the trio.
