= Noah Baerman =

American jazz musician

- Born: March 6, 1975 (age 50); New Haven, Connecticut, U.S.
- Genres: Jazz
- Instruments: Piano

Noah Baerman (born March 6, 1975) is an American jazz pianist and educator best known in Connecticut's jazz circles.

== Early life and education ==
Baerman was born in New Haven, Connecticut. He earned a Bachelor of Music and Master of Music in jazz studies from Rutgers University. During college, Baerman was mentored by Kenny Barron.

== Career ==
Baerman has released nine studio albums and collaborated with prominent jazz musicians, including Wayne Escoffery, Nadje Noordhuis, Linda May Han Oh, Ike Sturm, Jimmy Greene, Robin Eubanks, Warren Smith, and others. He has appeared on Piano Jazz. Although primarily a jazz musician, Baerman has done occasional work in gospel, soul music, R&B, and pop music.

== Personal life ==
Baerman has Ehlers–Danlos syndromes (EDS). The condition nearly led him to quit music at 28, though he decided against it. Baerman has since become an advocate for others diagnosed with EDS.
