= Sail Away (Tom Harrell album) =

Studio album by Tom Harrell
- Released: 1989
- Genre: Jazz
- Label: Contemporary
- Producer: Bill Goodwin

Tom Harrell chronology
Stories (1988)	Sail Away (1989)	Lonely Eyes (1989)

Sail Away is an album by the American musician Tom Harrell. It was released in 1989 via Contemporary Records. The title track became a jazz standard. The album was reissued in 2003 with two bonus tracks.

== Production ==
Joe Lovano played saxophone on four tracks. James Williams played piano; John Abercrombie played guitar.

== Critical reception ==
Professional ratings
Review scores
Source	Rating
AllMusic	4/5 stars
Chicago Sun-Times	3.5/4 stars
The Encyclopedia of Popular Music	4/5 stars
The Penguin Guide to Jazz Recordings	3.5/4 stars
Windsor Star	B+

The Windsor Star wrote that "some tunes hover around a Wayne Shorter mode with their oddly looping lines, like 'Dream in June'." The Chicago Tribune called the album "a lovely piece of work—fresh, concentrated, expressive." The Ottawa Citizen determined that "it's disappointing to find [Harrell's] melodic side overwhelmed by modal progressions and liberally stretched lines." The Washington Post deemed Sail Away "a beautifully arranged collection of mainstream jazz tunes, highlighted by several ballads and medium tempo tunes that make the most of Harrell's warm, soulful fluegelhorn."

The Village Voice noted "the skittery Miles [Davis] of the charged arpeggios, melodic shards, and rhythmic displacement" on "Eons" and the title track. The Chicago Reader labeled "Sail Away" "one of the finest jazz sambas ever written and one of the more memorable compositions of any kind in 20 years."

== Track listing ==
No.	Title	Length
1.	"Eons"
2.	"Glass Mystery"
3.	"Dream in June"
4.	"Sail Away"
5.	"Buffalo Wings"
6.	"It Always Is"
7.	"Dancing Trees"
8.	"Hope St."
