= Whaling City Sound =

Independent record label

- Founded: 1999
- Founder: Neal Weiss
- Distributor: Naxos
- Genre: Jazz
- Country of origin: U.S.
- Location: North Dartmouth, Massachusetts
- Official website: www.whalingcitysound.com

Whaling City Sound is an independent jazz record label established by Neal Weiss in 1999.

== History ==
Weiss is president of Fiber Optic Center in New Bedford, Massachusetts. A lifelong fan of jazz, he started Whaling City Sound as a jazz label, though he has dabbled in other genres such as blues and classical. The first acts to sign were both from New Bedford, pianist John Harrison and vocalist Marcelle Gauvin, who recorded the first album in the catalog. Gerry Gibbs, the son of jazz vibraphonist Terry Gibbs, fulfilled a dream when he formed the Thrasher Dream Trio with bassist Ron Carter and pianist Kenny Barron and released an album in 2013. Other musicians who have recorded for Whaling City Sound include guitarist Joe Beck, saxophonist Dave Liebman, and saxophonist Greg Abate.

== Roster ==
- Greg Abate
- John Abercrombie
- Thierry Arpino
- Danny Bacher
- Dave Bass
- Sheryl Bailey
- Kenny Barron
- Joe Beck
- Jerry Bergonzi
- Ramona Borthwick
- Don Braden
- Ron Carter
- Paul Cienniwa
- Joey DeFrancesco
- Santi Dibriano
- Miles Donahue
- Marcelle Gauvin
- Bruce Gertz
- Gerry Gibbs
- Terry Gibbs
- Dino Govoni
- Eric Hargett
- Monika Herzig
- Ingrid Jensen
- Steve Kirby
- Steve Langone
- Dave Liebman
- Alma Micic
- Rale Micic
- Jason Miles
- Marcus Monteiro
- Shawnn Monteiro
- Dan Moretti
- Greg Murphy
- Hilary Noble
- Jay Rodriguez
- Harvie S
- Kristen Lee Sergeant
- Mark T. Small
- John Stein
- Michael Stephans
- Clark Terry
- Alon Yavnai
- Reggie Young
- Dave Zinno
