= Time's Mirror =

Studio album by Tom Harrell
- Released: September 14, 1999
- Recorded: March 11–12, 1999
- Genre: Big band, jazz
- Length: 50:33
- Label: RCA Victor / RCA
- Producer: Bob Belden

Tom Harrell chronology
The Art of Rhythm (1998)	Time's Mirror (1999)	Paradise (2001)

Professional ratings
Review scores
Source	Rating
AllMusic	4/5 stars
The Penguin Guide to Jazz Recordings	3/4 stars

Time's Mirror is a 1999 big band album by jazz trumpeter, composer and arranger, Tom Harrell. In 2000 Harrell received a Grammy nomination for this album in category Best Large Jazz Ensemble Performance. Several of the tracks were originally composed by Harrell in the 1960s and are arranged for big band, recorded and released for the first time on this album. According to All About Jazz, this album is Harrell's "first full-fledged recording as a big-band impresario". AllMusic highly recommended the album, stating that several tracks are candidates to become jazz standards. The album charted at #16 on the Billboard Top Jazz Albums Chart.

== Track listing ==
No.	Title	Writer(s)	Length
1.	"Shapes"	Tom Harrell	8:19
2.	"Autumn Leaves"	Joseph Kosma, Johnny Mercer, Jacques Prévert	3:32
3.	"Daily News"	Tom Harrell	4:01
4.	"Dream"	Johnny Mercer	2:47
5.	"Chasin' the Bird"	Charlie Parker	5:07
6.	"São Paulo"	Tom Harrell	8:43
7.	"Time's Mirror"	Tom Harrell	8:09
8.	"Train Shuffle"	Tom Harrell	9:55

== Personnel ==
Credits adapted from AllMusic.

- Tom Harrell – flugelhorn, trumpet
- Earl Gardner – flugelhorn, trumpet
- Joe Magnarelli – flugelhorn, trumpet
- Chris Rogers – flugelhorn, trumpet
- David Weiss – flugelhorn, trumpet
- James Zollar – flugelhorn, trumpet
- Mike Fahn – trombone
- Conrad Herwig – trombone
- Curtis Hasselbring – trombone
- Douglas Purviance – trombone, bass trombone
- Craig Bailey – flute, alto saxophone
- Mark Gross – alto saxophone
- Alex Foster – flute, tenor saxophone
- Don Braden – tenor saxophone
- David Schumacher – baritone saxophone
- Xavier Davis – piano
- Kenny Davis – bass
- Carl Allen – drums
- Bob Belden – producer
