= Paul Cienniwa =

American musician

Paul Cienniwa is an American harpsichordist, organist, choral conductor, and arts administrator. He is the Executive Director of the Binghamton Philharmonic. Previously, he was a Music Director at First Church in Boston and Chorus Master at the New Bedford Symphony Orchestra. He was on the faculties of the Music School at the Rhode Island Philharmonic Orchestra, Lynn University Conservatory of Music, UMass Dartmouth, and Framingham State University. He has recorded for Albany Records and Whaling City Sound. He has collaborated with uilleann piper Jerry O'Sullivan, recorder player Aldo Abreu, baroque violinist Dorian Komanoff Bandy, and violinist Rachel Barton Pine.

== Life ==
Cienniwa was born in Niles, Illinois in 1972. He completed his undergraduate at DePaul University in 1994. He then attended the Yale School of Music, where he earned a M.M. in 1997, a M.M.A. in 1998, and a D.M.A. in 2003. His principal teachers were harpsichordists Roger Goodman and Richard Rephann and organist Jerome Butera.

== Discography ==
- Telemann Sonatas for Violin and Harpsichord: Frankfurt, 1715 (Whaling City Sound, 2018)
- Allison: Volume One (2015)
- Harpsichord Music for a Thin Place (Whaling City Sound, 2012)
- Larry Bell: In a Garden of Dreamers (Albany, 2012)
- O'Sullivan Meets O'Farrell (2010)
- Bach: Sonatas for Viola da Gamba (Whaling City Sound, 2009)

== Publications ==
- By Heart: The Art of Memorizing Music (2014)
