= Dave Bass =

American jazz pianist, composer, and lyricist

- Born: David Ira Bass; June 21, 1950 (age 75)
- Origin: Cincinnati, Ohio, U.S.
- Genres: Jazz
- Occupations: Musician, composer, lawyer
- Instrument: Piano
- Years active: 1968–present
- Labels: Whaling City Sound, Tiger Turn, DBQ, and DaveBassMusic
- Website: davebassmusic.com

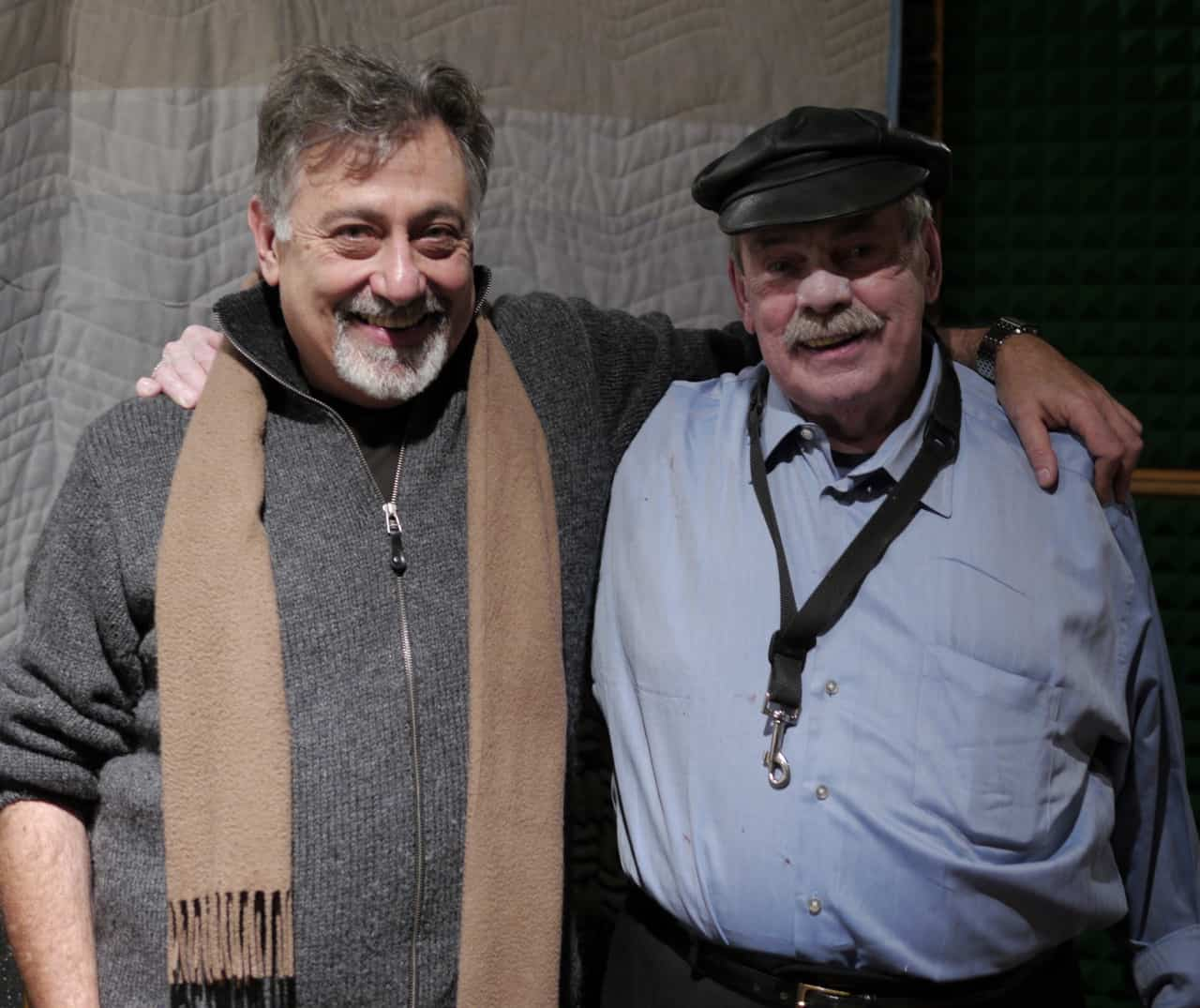
Dave Bass w/ Phil Woods (2015)

David Ira Bass (born June 21, 1950) is an American jazz pianist, composer, arranger, and lyricist who has released eight albums: Gone (2010), NYC Sessions (2015), No Boundaries (2019),The Trio Vol. 1 (2021), The Trio Vol. 2 (2022), The Trio Vol. 3 (2023), Trio Nuevo (2024). and Trio Nuevo Vol 2 (2025). Due to a wrist injury in the mid-1980s, Bass left music to become an attorney. In January 2015, he retired from his position as a Deputy Attorney General for the California State Attorney General's office to devote himself to music.

== Early life and education ==
Bass grew up in Cincinnati, Ohio, and began studying piano at the age of seven. He was accepted to the Berklee College of Music in Boston, but dropped out after a few months to study composition with George Russell, who had begun teaching his Lydian Chromatic Concept of Tonal Organization at the New England Conservatory of Music and piano with Madame Margaret Chaloff.

With a family to support, he chose to enroll in college at the University of California at Irvine, earning his Bachelor of Arts in social ecology and graduating summa cum laude and Phi Beta Kappa in 1989. He went on to attend the UCLA School of Law, where he was an editor of the UCLA Law Review, clerked in the Sacramento legislative office of the American Civil Liberties Union and, in 1991, served as legal extern to Judge David F. Levi. Bass earned his J.D. in 1992 from the UCLA School of Law.

== Career ==
=== Early musical career ===
In 1974, he started touring internationally with singer Brenda Lee. He performed with Lee until 1975, after which he relocated to San Francisco. While in San Francisco, Bass performed with the young Bobby McFerrin and with vocalist Jackie Ryan, drummer/percussionist Babatunde Lea and others in various Bay Area venues, including the Keystone Korner. Ryan joined Bass’ band "Ad Infinitum," which also featured Babatunde Lea who had a steady Wednesday night gig at a Mission District venue, Bajones, with a large, jazzy salsa ensemble with whom Bass played piano and wrote arrangements. Bass also had a steady solo gig at the Trident in Sausalito.

Ultimately, Bass moved to Maui to work with Ryan, remaining there from 1981 through 1984. During that time, Bass also served as the Entertainment Director for the Royal Lahaina Resort, where he performed with his Latin jazz group, his jazz trio, and as a solo pianist. In 1984, Bass relocated to Southern California, where he planned to continue his career as a pianist and composer.

=== Legal career ===
Immediately out of law school, Bass joined Pillsbury Winthrop Shaw Pittman, where he practiced general litigation for four years. In 1996, Bass joined the California Office of the Attorney General. At the attorney general's office, Bass began in the Employment, Administration and Regulation Section, eventually moving to the Civil Rights Enforcement Section.

=== Return to music ===
In December 2008, after a few years playing casually with friends around Sacramento, Bass returned to the studio to record Gone, his first album as a leader. He recorded ten original compositions with saxophonist Ernie Watts, Babatunde on percussion, bassist Gary Brown, and vocalist Mary Stallings. The album reached No. 2 on the JazzWeek national radio play charts.

Bass returned to the studio in 2012 to record NYC Sessions (Whaling City Sound). The album includes saxophonist Phil Woods, drummer Ignacio Berroa, trombonist Conrad Herwig, and bassist Harvie S, with guest vocalist Karrin Allyson. NYC Sessions reached No. 5 on the JazzWeek national radio play charts. The album received a four-star review from DownBeat magazine in its May 2015 issue with the comment that the album "proves deeply satisfying in part because it does so may things so well [including] Bass' savvy as an arranger and programmer [...] not to mention his own sparking keyboard work." DownBeat named NYC Sessions one of the Best Albums of 2015. Jazz critic Ken Franckling named Bass' "Baltic Bolero" one of the Top Ten Jazz Songs of 2015. Latin-Jazz Network contributor Raul De Gama gave high praise to the album and Bass' piano skills.

In October 2018, Dave returned to the studio to record his third album, No Boundaries. Multi-instrumentalist and Jazz at Lincoln Center Orchestra member, Ted Nash, co-produced No Boundaries and played on all but one track, featuring Bass in the classic piano trio setting with Bud Powell’s "Hallucinations." The band includes Carlos Henriquez (also from JALCO) on upright bass, Jerome Jennings on drums and Ted Nash on flute, alto flute, clarinet, bass clarinet, soprano sax, alto sax, and tenor sax. Vocalist Karrin Allyson returns to work with Dave singing one of Dave's originals, "Time of My Life" and Dave's arrangement of Rodgers and Hammerstein’s "If I Loved You." On three Afro-Cuban cuts three native Cubans appear: Carlos Caro (bongo, perc.), Miguelo Valdes (conga, bata) and Mauricio Herrera.

No Boundaries was played nationally and internationally, with a 15-week span on the JazzWeek charts, peaking at #13.

No Boundaries received positive reviews from critics for the composition and musical style.

On July 11, 2021, Bass released The Trio Vol.1 featuring Kerry Kashiwagi on bass and Scott Gordon on drums. Chris Spector of the Midwest Record said Bass was "showing just how furious a jazzbo he can be as he leads his piano trio through a veritable wing ding of epic proportions." The album spent 13 weeks in the Top 50 on the national JazzWeek charts, peaking at #15.

On July 17, 2022, Bass released The Trio Vol. 2 featuring the same lineup. Glide Magazine's Doug Collette remarked, "ranging from sources including Denny Zeitlin, Bud Powell, Andrew Hill and Bass himself (in four instances), spare takes on unorthodox material sound like an unending exposition of imagination; with consummate grace and alacrity, the musicians contour their motion through the twists and turns of convoluted material commencing so emphatically with Annette Peacock’s”El Cordobes.” Bass invariably leads the charge with his assertive piano work, but he is otherwise hardly more authoritative or lithe of touch than his counterparts Kerry Kashiwagi and Scott Gordon on bass and drums respectively."

On May 12, 2023, Bass released Trio Vol. 3 with the same personnel as Vol. 1 and 2 and received wide and sustained nation-wide radio play as shown its reaching #7 on JazzWeek, where it was in the top 20 for 10 weeks.

Trio Vol.3 hit #41 on JazzWeek's Top 100 albums in 2023 for nation-wide radio play; it was on the charts for 24 weeks with 2,840 spins.

Dave released Trio Nuevo in April 2024 and it peaked at #16 on JazzWeek.

Working with a new trio (Tyler Miles on contra-bass and Steve Helfand on drums), Trio Nuevo received many excellent reviews. Pierre Giroux in All About Jazz wrote: "In a captivating showcase of musical virtuosity and creative synergy, pianist Dave Bass' latest album Trio Nuevo transcends the traditional confines of jazz by seamlessly weaving together a variety of genres from Bach to bebop and beyond. Accompanying Bass on this musical adventure are bassist Tyler Miles and drummer Steve Helfand who prove to be exemplary partners and imposingly proficient players."

MediaVersal said: "The latest release from Dave Bass, "Trio Nuevo," showcases his evolving artistry as a pianist, composer, and arranger. Marking his seventh album as a leader, this album continues his journey in the trio format on which he displays an eclectic range that spans from Bach to bebop. I sense the album will leave an indelible mark in the jazz world."

Lynn René Baley in The Art Muisc Lounge wrote, "This is really a wonderful CD mixing mainstream jazz with imaginative subtlety and years of experience in knowing how to create solos that are compositions in themselves. Highly recommended!"

In May 2025, Bass released Trio Nuevo Vol.2, again with bassist Tyler Miles and drummer Steve Helfand.

Trio Nuevo Vol.2 peaked at #4 on the national jazz chart, JazzWeek.com, and was on the charts for 19 weeks.
