= Heavy hitter =

Heavy hitter or heavy hitters can refer to:

- The Heavy Hitter, a 1979 album by Eddie "Lockjaw" Davis
- Heavy Hitters, a 2005 album by the Michael Schenker Group
- Heavy Hitters (comics), a Marvel Comics superhero team
- Heavy Hitters, a line of comic books for mature audiences published by Marvel Comics under its creator-owned Epic Comics imprint
  - Heavy Hitters Annual, a 1993 anthology comic book featuring several series published under the Heavy Hitters branding
- The trademarked phrase "The Heavy Hitters", used first by the law firm Alexander & Catalano and later by James Alexander Law
