= Alexander & Catalano =

- Company type: Limited liability company
- Industry: Legal services
- Founded: 1995
- Defunct: 2019
- Fate: Amicably dissolved into two separate law firms, James Alexander Law and Catalano Law
- Headquarters: Syracuse, New York
- Key people: James L. Alexander, Peter Catalano
- Products: Personal injury legal representation
- Number of employees: 8 attorneys plus support staff
- Website: www.alexanderandcatalano.com

Alexander & Catalano was an Upstate New York based law firm practicing in the area of personal injury and worker's compensation related cases. The firm was headquartered in Syracuse, but also had offices in Rochester and Binghamton.

== History ==
Alexander & Catalano was founded in 1995.

The law firm was known for their advertising campaigns. In 2007, the firm came under scrutiny for its advertising techniques, including the use of their trademarked slogan "The Heavy Hitters". The advertising of Alexander and Catalano, as well as that of Jim "The Hammer" Shapiro, were cited by the Democrat and Chronicle as reasons for the January 2007 amendment of the Code of Professional Responsibility by the New York State Office of Court Administration, which is responsible for attorney regulation and discipline in New York State. The new rules prohibited the use of certain types of advertising methods, including client testimonials, slogans and nicknames, and portraying lawyers with characteristics unrelated to legal counsel. In June of that year, Alexander and Catalano along with Public Citizen, filed a lawsuit in US District Court charging that the new rules violated the firm's First Amendment rights. Senior US District Court Judge Frederick Scullin ruled that certain provisions of the new rules, including prohibiting the use of nicknames in advertising, did indeed violate their First Amendment right to freedom of speech.

In November 2019, the two partners dissolved amicably over a difference of opinion regarding the firm's direction.

- James Alexander reorganized his firm, first as Alexander & Associates before changing in late 2022 to James Alexander Law, continuing to use "The Heavy Hitters" slogan and jingle. The previous firm's website alexanderandcatalano.com now redirects to James Alexander Law.
- Peter Catalano established his own Syracuse based personal injury, workmans comp, and social security disability focused firm called Catalano Law
