= Uoniverse =

Studio album by Ugonna Okegwo
- Released: August 3, 2004; First release: 2002
- Recorded: March 27, 2002
- Genre: Jazz
- Length: 1:04:31
- Label: Satchmo Jazz
- Producer: Ugonna Okegwo

Professional ratings
Review scores
Source	Rating
Jazzreview.com	4/5 stars

Uoniverse is an album by jazz bassist Ugonna Okegwo released in 2002. The album is Okegwo's first release as a leader. The album consists of five original compositions by Okegwo and five new arrangements of jazz classics, including Thelonious Monk's "Let's Call This". Jazzreview.com gave the album a rating of 4 stars and called Okegwo one of the leading bassists of his generation. All About Jazz highly recommended the album, calling it "truly diverse" and the band's rhythm "impeccable".

== Track listing ==
No.	Title	Writer(s)	Length
1.	"Introducing the Uoniverse"	Ugonna Okegwo	9:28
2.	"Never Let Me Go"	Ray Evans, Jay Livingston	7:25
3.	"Three Views of a Secret"	Jaco Pastorius	9:55
4.	"Back to Zero"	Ugonna Okegwo	2:25
5.	"Elasticity"	Ugonna Okegwo	7:57
6.	"Let's Call This"	Thelonious Monk	5:41
7.	"Suspended Memory"	Ugonna Okegwo	5:13
8.	"Cherokee"	Ray Noble	4:25
9.	"The Whirl"	Ugonna Okegwo	8:17
10.	"Infant Eyes"	Wayne Shorter	3:45

== Personnel ==
Credits adapted from AllMusic.

- Ugonna Okegwo – arranger, composer, producer, primary artist, audio production, double bass
- Xavier Davis – piano
- Donald Edwards – drums
- Sam Newsome – guest artist, sax (soprano)
- Ray Evans – composer
- Jay Livingston – composer
- Thelonious Monk – composer
- Ray Noble – composer
- Jaco Pastorius – composer
- Wayne Shorter – composer
- Katsuhiko Naito – mastering
- Jordi Vidal – audio engineer, engineer
