= John Stein (guitarist) =

American jazz guitarist and teacher

- Born: Kansas City, Missouri, U.S.
- Genres: Jazz
- Occupations: Musician, teacher
- Instrument: Guitar
- Labels: Jardis, Whaling City Sound
- Website: johnstein.com

John Stein is a jazz guitarist and teacher from Kansas City, Missouri.

== Career ==
A native of Kansas City, Missouri, Stein took his first guitar lesson when he was seven and his first jazz lesson when he was thirteen. In 1967, he attended Beloit College, but he dropped out and moved to Vermont. He worked in local clubs playing rock music, then took jazz lessons from a pianist. When he was thirty, he attended the Berklee College of Music and taught there after he graduated. He received a master's degree in education from Harvard and also plays double bass. His first album, Hustle Up!, was released in 1995.

Stein considers Wes Montgomery and Jim Hall his two biggest influences. One of his favorite albums since childhood is Getz/Gilberto, released in 1964 by Stan Getz, João Gilberto, and Antônio Carlos Jobim. He recorded his album Concerto Internacional de Jazz (2006) in Brazil. In 2005, he made his public debut as bandleader with David "Fathead" Newman.

For several years, Stein wrote a column for Just Jazz Guitar magazine about arranging and composing. Some of this material was compiled for his books Jazz Standards for Solo Guitar, Composing Tunes for Jazz Performance, and Composing Blues for Jazz Performance.

He has worked with Bill Pierce, John LaPorta, David "Fathead" Newman, Larry Goldings, and Bob Freedman. He has performed on stage with David "Fathead" Newman, Lou Donaldson, Lonnie Smith, Johnny Vidacovich, and Idris Muhammad. He toured France, Germany, Switzerland, Brazil, Spain, and the U.S.

== Discography ==
- Hustle Up! (Knitting Factory, 1995)
- Green Street (Challenge, 1999)
- Portraits and Landscapes (Jardis, 2000)
- Conversation Pieces (Jardis, 2002)
- Interplay (Azica, 2004)
- Concerto Internacional de Jazz (Whaling City Sound, 2006)
- Encounterpoint (Whaling City Sound, 2008)
- Raising the Roof (Whaling City Sound, 2010)
- Turn Up the Quiet with Ron Gill (Whaling City Sound, 2010)
- Hi Fly (Whaling City Sound, 2011)
- Bing Bang Boom! (Whaling City Sound, 2012)
- Emotion (Whaling City Sound, 2014)
- Color Tones (Whaling City Sound, 2017)
- Wood and Strings with Dave Zinno (Whaling City Sound, 2017)
- Watershed (Whaling City Sound, 2020)
- Serendipity (Whaling City Sound, 2021)
- Lifeline (Whaling City Sound, 2022)
- No Goodbyes (Whaling City Sound, 2023)
- Next Gen (Tiger Turn/JS Jazz 2025)
- Among Friends (Tiger Turn/JS Jazz 2025)
