= Greg Abate =

American jazz saxophonist, flautist, and composer (born 1947)

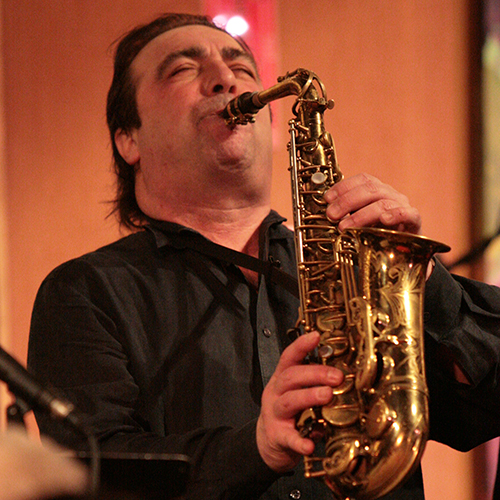

Background information
- Born: May 31, 1947 (age 78); Fall River, Massachusetts, U.S.
- Genres: Jazz
- Occupations: Musician, composer, arranger
- Instruments: Alto saxophone, flute
- Years active: 1973–present
- Labels: Candid, Brownstone, Blue Chip, Koko, Whaling City Sound
- Website: www.gregabate.com

Greg Abate (born May 31, 1947) is a jazz saxophonist, flautist, composer, and arranger. He grew up in Woonsocket, Rhode Island. In the fifth grade he began to play clarinet.

== Career ==
After high school, he attended Berklee College of Music in Boston. After working for several years in California, he returned to Berklee in 1972 to finish his education. During a second trip to Los Angeles he was hired to play alto saxophone in the Ray Charles band in 1973 and '74.

Soon after, Abate formed a sextet called Channel One. The group's only album, Without Boundaries, was released in 1980. While living in Rhode Island, he became a member of Sax Odyssey, led by Tony Giorgianni, and Duke Bellair's Jazz Orchestra. In 1986 he was hired by Dick Johnson to play tenor saxophone in the Artie Shaw band. He has also appeared with Jerome Richardson and Red Rodney. He has taught at Rhode Island College.

In April 2016 Abate was among eight inductees for the Rhode Island Music Hall of Fame.

== Discography ==
- Bop City: Live at Birdland (Candid, 1991)
- Straight Ahead (Candid, 1993)
- Dr Jeckyll & Mr Hyde (Candid, 1995)
- It's Christmas Time (Brownstone Recordings, 1995)
- Bop Lives! (1201 Music/Blue Chip Jazz, 1996)
- Happy Samba (Blue Chip, 1998)
- Evolution (1201 Music, 2002)
- Horace Is Here (Koko Jazz, 2005)
- Monsters in the Night (Koko Jazz, 2006)
- Horace Is Here: A Tribute to Horace Silver (Rhombus, 2011)
- The Greg Abate Quintet Featuring Phil Woods (Posi-Tone, 2012)
- Motif (Whaling City Sound, 2014)
- Kindred Spirits: Live at Chan's (Whaling City Sound, 2016)
- Road to Forever (Whaling City Sound, 2016)
- Gratitude (Whaling City Sound, 2019)
- Magic Dance: The Music of Kenny Barron (Whaling City Sound, 2021)
