= Ugonna Okegwo =

German-Nigerian jazz bassist and composer

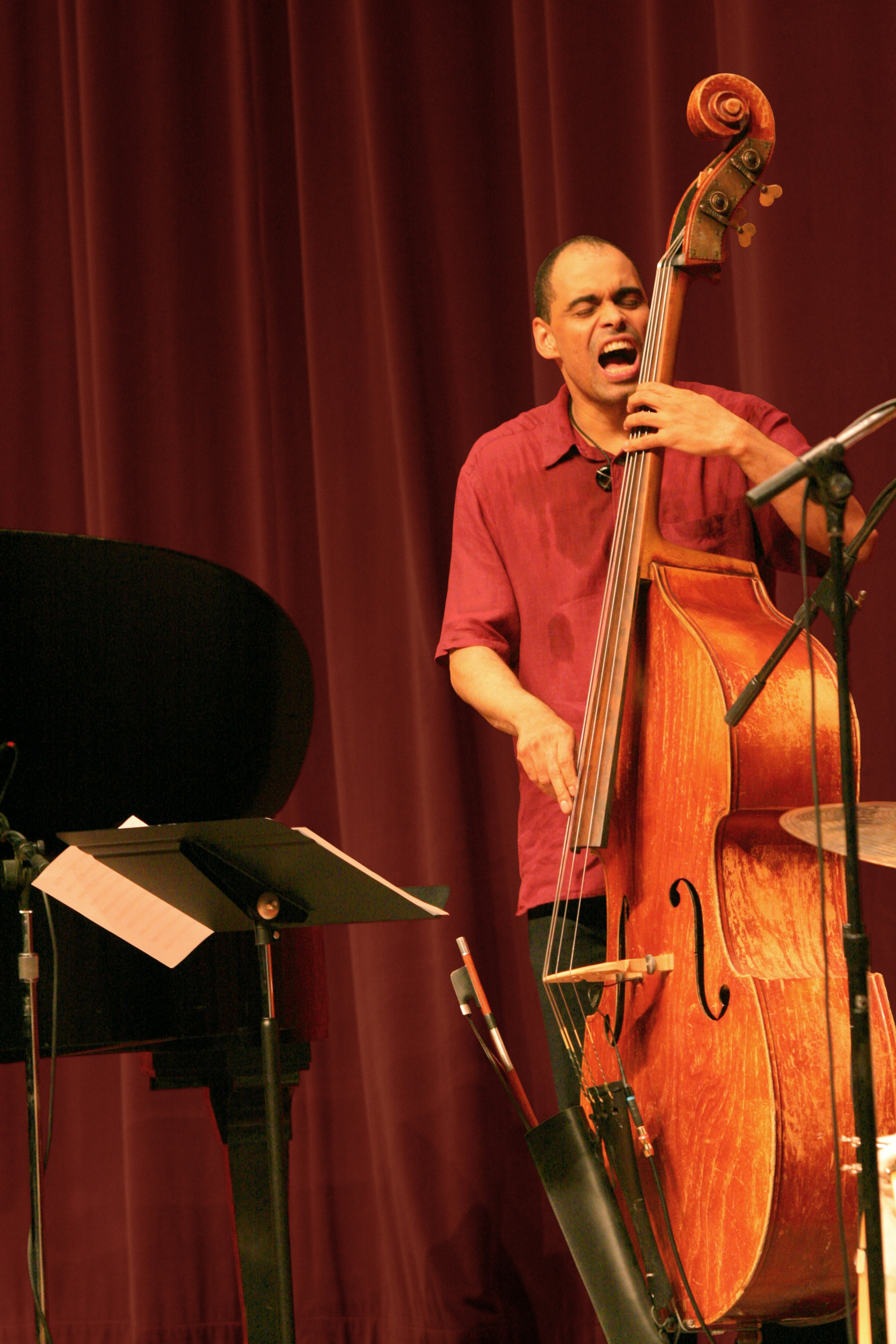
- Okegwo in 2010

Background information
- Born: March 15, 1962 (age 64); London, England
- Origin: Münster, Germany
- Genres: Jazz
- Occupations: Musician, composer
- Instrument: Bass
- Years active: 1986–present
- Website: ugonnaokegwo.com

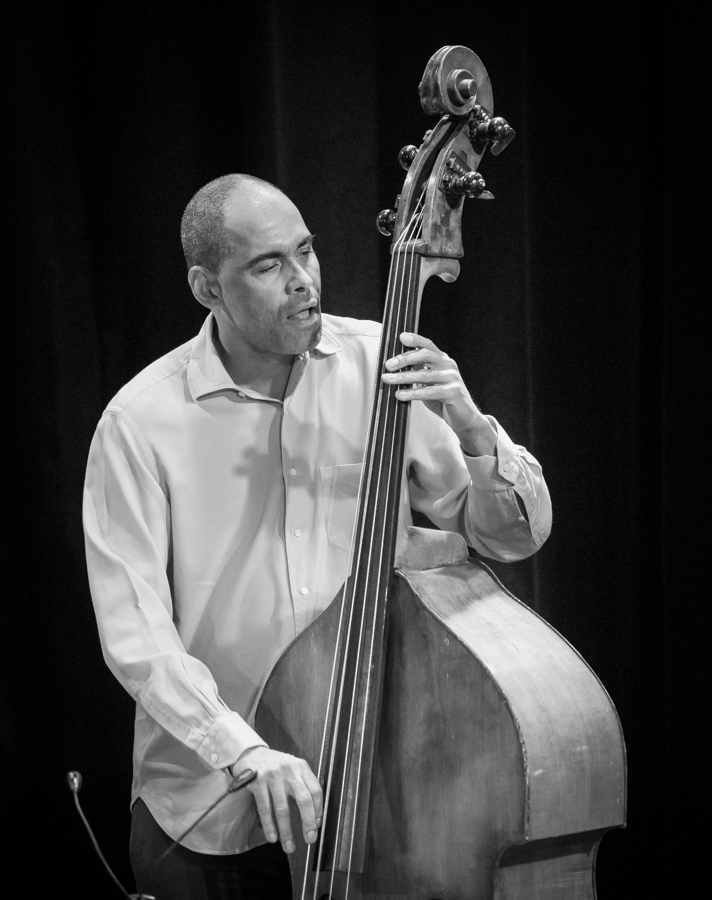
Okegwo at Oslo Jazz Festival, 2017

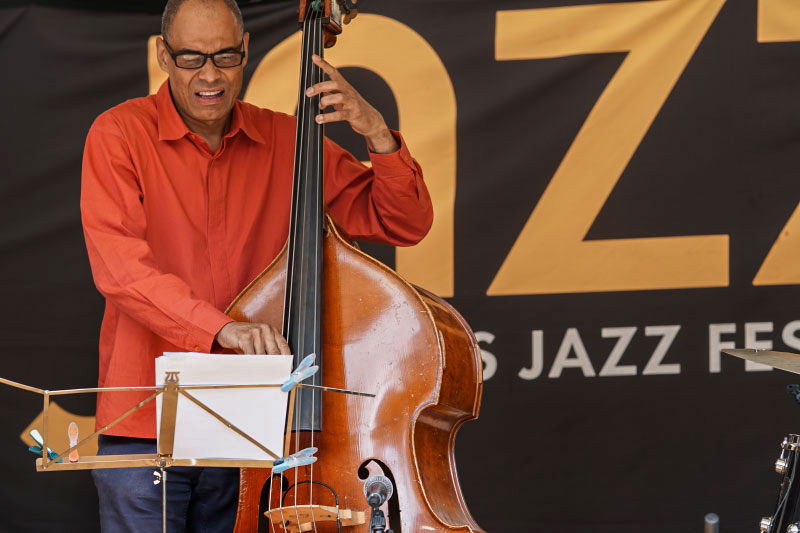
Okegwo at Aarhus Jazz Festival, 2019

Ugonna Okegwo (born March 15, 1962) is a German-Nigerian jazz bassist and composer based in New York City.

== Biography ==
Born in London, Okegwo is the son of Christel Katharina Lulf and Madueke Benedict Okegwo. In 1963 the family moved to Münster, Germany, where Okegwo grew up. As a youngster he enjoyed working with his hands and played the electric bass. At age 21, he took a class in violin-making and started playing the upright bass.

In 1986 Okegwo moved to Berlin and studied with bassist Jay Oliver and pianist Walter Norris. He then joined trombonist Lou Blackburn's group for a tour in Europe and played with Joe Newman, Oliver Jackson and Major Holley.

In 1989 Okegwo moved to New York City and worked with saxophonists Big Nick Nicholas, Junior Cook and James Spaulding. He worked with vocalist Jon Hendricks on a regular basis. He earned a bachelor's degree in Fine Arts from Long Island University, graduating summa cum laude in 1994. In the early 1990s Okegwo formed a trio with pianist Jacky Terrasson and drummer Leon Parker. In 1997 he started to perform regularly in Tom Harrell ensembles. He is a member of the Tom Harrell Quintet and the Mingus Big Band, and he is an associate instructor of music at Columbia University.

In 2002, Okegwo released his first album as a leader titled Uoniverse. About creating music Okegwo said, producing a note is human and personal and "in a rhythm section, the bass is the center, creating something constantly."

Okegwo has worked with a wide range of artists, including Kenny Barron, Michael Brecker, Benny Carter, Johnny Griffin, Wynton Marsalis, James Moody, Clark Terry, Pharoah Sanders, Steve Wilson, Michael Wolff, Bruce Barth, Steve Davis, Dario Chiazzolino, Lionel Hampton, Sam Newsome, Kurt Rosenwinkel and others.

== Discography ==
=== As leader ===
- Uoniverse (Satchmo Jazz, 2002)

=== As sideman ===
Credits partly adapted from AllMusic. This list is incomplete.

With Tom Harrell

- The Art of Rhythm (RCA Victor, 1998)
- Light On (HighNote, 2007)
- Prana Dance (HighNote, 2009)
- Roman Nights (HighNote, 2010)
- The Time of the Sun (HighNote, 2011)
- Number Five (HighNote, 2012)
- Colors of a Dream (HighNote, 2013)
- TRIP (HighNote, 2014)
- First Impressions (HighNote, 2015)
- Something Gold, Something Blue (HighNote, 2016)
- Moving Picture (HighNote, 2017)
- Oak Tree (HighNote, 2022)
- Alternate Summer (HighNote, 2024)

With LaVerne Butler

- Love Lost and Found Again (HighNote, 2012)

With Peter Zak

- The Decider (SteepleChase, 2009)

With Dan Faulk

- Dan Faulk Songbook, Vol.1 (Ugli Fruit, 2002)

With Jacky Terrasson

- Lover Man (Venus, 2002, Recorded 1993)
- Jacky Terrasson (Blue Note, 1994)
- Reach (Blue Note, 1996)
- Alive (Blue Note, 1998)
- What It Is (Blue Note, 1999)
- A Paris... (Blue Note, 2001)

With Sam Newsome

- This Masquerade (SteepleChase, 2000)
- The Tender Side of Sammy Straighthor (SteepleChase, 2000)
- Global Unity (Palmetto, 2001)

With Jon Hendricks

- Boppin' at the Blue Note (Telarc, 1994)

With Wayne Escoffery

- The Humble Warrior (2020)

With Riverside Trio

- Riverside (2022)

With Mark Sherman

- With Freedom (2023)
