= Laïka Fatien =

French singer

Laïka Fatien is a French singer a.k.a. Laika.

== Personal life ==
She was born in Paris in 1968. Her mother is Spanish and Moroccan, and her father is from Ivory Coast.

She studied at ARIAM Île-de-France, CIM and IACP (jazz music schools).

== Music career ==
Laïka Fatien recorded her first album in 2003 under her full name, and was published by the Parisien label Body & Soul the following year. On Look at Me Now! she was accompanied by a piano trio plus tenor saxophone or acoustic guitar on some tracks that comprised songs as "Throw It Away" by Abbey Lincoln, "Inchworm", "Eleanor Rigby", "I Hear Music" and compositions by Nicholas Payton and Wayne Shorter. The following album Misery was a tribute to Billie Holiday recorded in Paris and released by Blujazz in 2008. For the self-produced album she got Robert Glasper as pianist for most of the tracks.

Signed by Verve Records/Universal France in 2011 she recorded Nebula produced by Meshell Ndegeocello and essential contributions by Oliver Lake and Chris Bruce. The following year she recorded Come a Little Closer for EmArcy (Universal) featuring Roy Hargrove, Ambrose Akinmusire, Graham Haynes and Rufus Reid, arranged by Gil Goldstein. The album was produced by Jay Newland while Jean-Philippe Allard (who produced Abbey Lincoln since 1990 until her last album in 2006) is credited for A&R and as executive producer.

With her talent deeply rooted in Paris, Laïka was often called on to accompany various artists such as: Vanessa Paradis and Rockin' Squat. On pianist Ran Blake's recording of Cocktails at Dusk – A Noir Tribute to Chris Connor (2014) she was featured on three duo takes. In 2016, Laïka was part of the Disney homage recording entitled Jazz Loves Disney alongside Gregory Porter and Jamie Cullum.

Issey Miyake, the Japanese designer selected Laïka as his "European Muse" for the Tokyo Universal Exhibition in Japan. She performed at the Luminato Festival in 2013 at the 70th Birthday Concert for Joni Mitchell at Massey Hall, Toronto, Canada. In 2016, she created with Christopher Thomas, the band Laïka & The Unit.

== Theater ==
After a workshop with Jack Garfein (Actors Studio) in 1998, her interest in theater started to grow. She subsequently worked on and performed in several theater productions. At the National Theater of Chaillot she played Madame Zajj in A Drum Is a Woman, directed by Jérôme Savary with music by Duke Ellington. For jazz opera Celestina del Sol written by José Rivera she was chosen for the tile role in the production at the Théâtre de la Ville in Paris directed by François Rancillac, also performed at the Angers-Nantes Opéra. In Spain at the Zarzuela Theater in Madrid she sang Princess Maori in Los Sobrinos del Capitan Grant directed by Paco Mir.

== Sources ==
- Philippe Carles, André Clergeat, Jean-Louis Comolli. Le nouveau dictionnaire du jazz. R. Laffont, Paris 2011.
