= Maria Schneider =

Maria Schneider may refer to:

- Maria Schneider (politician) (born 1923), East German politician
- Maria Schneider (actress) (1952–2011), French actress
- Maria Schneider (musician) (born 1960), American musician and composer
- Maria Schneider (cartoonist) (born 1968), American cartoonist and illustrator
- Maria "Dish" Schneider, a fictional character from the M*A*S*H franchise
