= Nancie Banks =

American musician

Nancie Banks (born Nancie Manzuk, July 29, 1951 – November 2002) was an American jazz singer.

Born in Morgantown, West Virginia, Banks sang in a church choir with her father as a child and learned piano from her mother at age four. She lived in Pittsburgh for a time, then relocated to New York City in the 1980s and studied with Edward Boatner, Barry Harris, and Alberto Socarras, and performed with both small ensembles and big bands. She married trombonist Clarence Banks later in the decade after she joined Charlie Byrd's band, of which he was a member. Among the musicians she worked with were Lionel Hampton, Dexter Gordon, Walter Davis Jr., Bob Cunningham, Duke Jordan, Diane Schuur, George Benson, Woody Shaw, Jon Hendricks, Walter Booker, Bross Townsend, Charlie Persip, Walter Bishop, Jr., and Sadik Hakim.

In 1989 she founded her own big band and recorded four albums between 1992 and 2001. She also worked on film soundtracks, including Mo' Better Blues (1990) and Housesitter (1992), and in Broadway musicals such as Swingin' On a Star. During the 1990s, she taught jazz at the City University of New York.

Banks died in New York City in November 2002. Her body was found in her home; the exact day she died is unknown.

== Discography ==
- Waves of Peace (Consolidated Artists Productions, 1992)
- Bert's Blues (Consolidated Artists Productions, 1994)
- Ear Candy (GFI, 1999)
- Out of It (GFI, 2001)
