= Jim Shapiro (attorney) =

American attorney and author

- Education: Boston University School of Law; Syracuse University
- Occupation: Lawyer

James J. Shapiro better known as his nickname, Jim "The Hammer" Shapiro, is an American attorney and author who was known in the Rochester, New York area and Florida (as well as some parts of Canada near Rochester station) for his aggressive television commercials, as well as for a letter of solicitation he sent to a comatose accident victim. Shapiro was suspended in 2004 from practicing law for one year in New York and from practicing law for one year in Florida in 2005. In 2007, his advertisements were cited as partial inspiration for a new set of New York State rules limiting attorneys' advertisements. Shapiro sold all three of his law firms and now writes books. He is the author of Victims [sic] Rights to Maximum Cash, Sue the Bastards, Million Dollar Lungs, Injury Victims [sic] Rights to Maximum Cash, Instant Credit Repair and Get Back All Your Lost Investments!.

== Career ==
Shapiro graduated from Boston University School of Law. He is a member of the Plaintiff's Securities Lawyers Group. He resigned his registration with the New York State Office of Court Administration, meaning he is no longer duly admitted to the New York Bar. He founded three law firms and had offices in Broward County, Florida; Rochester, Syracuse, and Buffalo, New York.

In the 1990s, Shapiro became controversial for his self-promotional television commercials in which he promised to obtain large financial settlements for accident victims, referred to himself as "the meanest, nastiest S.O.B. in town" and claimed to have "aggressive courtroom prowess". His ads' visuals frequently included vehicle crashes, falling bodies, Satan, threats of physical violence against defendants, images from the video game Doom, animals and people being hit by trains, and explosions. He also began selling not-for-profit t-shirts which featured "a vicious beast with blood dripping from its fangs" and the words "Protected by Vicious S.O.B., Jim The Hammer Shapiro."

Shapiro sold all three law firms and now writes books. He is the author of Victims [sic] Rights to Maximum Cash, Sue the Bastards, Million Dollar Lungs, Injury Victims [sic] Rights to Maximum Cash, Instant Credit Repair and Get Back All Your Lost Investments!.

In 2007, Shapiro's advertisements were cited by the Rochester Democrat and Chronicle as partial inspiration for a new set of rules the New York State Court System has implemented that limit attorneys' advertisements. The new rules prohibit, among other things, nicknames such as "The Hammer". The constitutionality of the rules was called into question when Judge Frederick Scullin of the United States District Court for the Northern District of New York permanently enjoined some of the provisions in July 2007.

== Bar discipline ==
In 2002, Christopher Wagner, a former client, sued Shapiro for malpractice. Wagner was injured in a 1995 motor vehicle accident and had responded to Shapiro's commercials. Wagner claimed he had incurred $182,000 in medical bills, but Shapiro's firm, Shapiro and Shapiro, encouraged him to accept a settlement of $65,000, promising more money could be obtained in a lawsuit against the state of New York. However, the state had no liability and Shapiro never pursued any further action on Wagner's behalf.

In its opinion suspending Shapiro, the New York Supreme Court, Appellate Division, found that he had "never tried a case to its conclusion [in New York] and had conducted approximately 10 depositions." Shapiro had lived in Florida since 1995, remotely supervising his New York office. Wagner's lawyer, Robert Williams, claimed Shapiro's firm in Rochester was staffed by one lawyer who had only taken four cases to trial. The New York Supreme Court jury found the law firm owned by Shapiro had engaged in misleading advertising and legal malpractice and awarded a $1.5 million judgment against Shapiro.

Consequently, in 2004, he was suspended from practicing law for one year in New York. In 2005 he was also suspended from practicing law for one year in Florida. Shapiro said the decision to suspend him from practicing in New York was "unfair and unconstitutional" but claimed the ruling would have little effect because he had sold his Rochester office and was now promoting books. In December, 2004, four additional former clients unsuccessfully sued Shapiro for unspecified damages, alleging he had engaged in misleading advertising and legal malpractice.

== Philanthropy ==
Shapiro is known for his philanthropy in Rochester. Since 1996, he has donated $7,500 per year to elementary schools to purchase books. He has indicated that his goal is to put $600,000 worth of books into schools within ten years. In 1996, he donated 86.5 acres (350,000 m^{2}) of land worth $800,000 to the Rochester YMCA. He has also donated land in Rochester valued at $120,000 to be used as a park for children.

== In popular culture ==
Dunkin' Donuts parodied Shapiro in a commercial for its breakfast menu in 2010, with a sound-alike named Bob "The Bulldozer" Phillips. Phillips imitated Shapiro's "every single penny" advertisement almost to the letter.

Winnipeg-based ska band Whole Lotta Milka wrote a song based on Shapiro called "The Hammer" on their 1999 album Al's Diner. WUHF (FOX) Rochester has historically served as the main national FOX feed for Shaw Direct television in Winnipeg and across Canada.

== Publications ==
- Shapiro, J., Sue the Bastards, Advertising Consultants World Wide Inc., 1997
- Shapiro, J., Victims Rights to Maximum Cash,
- Shapiro, J., Million Dollar Lungs
- Shapiro, J., Injury Victims Rights to Maximum Cash, 1992
- Shapiro, J., Get Back All Your Lost Investments!
