= Jaleel Shaw =

American saxophonist (born 1978)

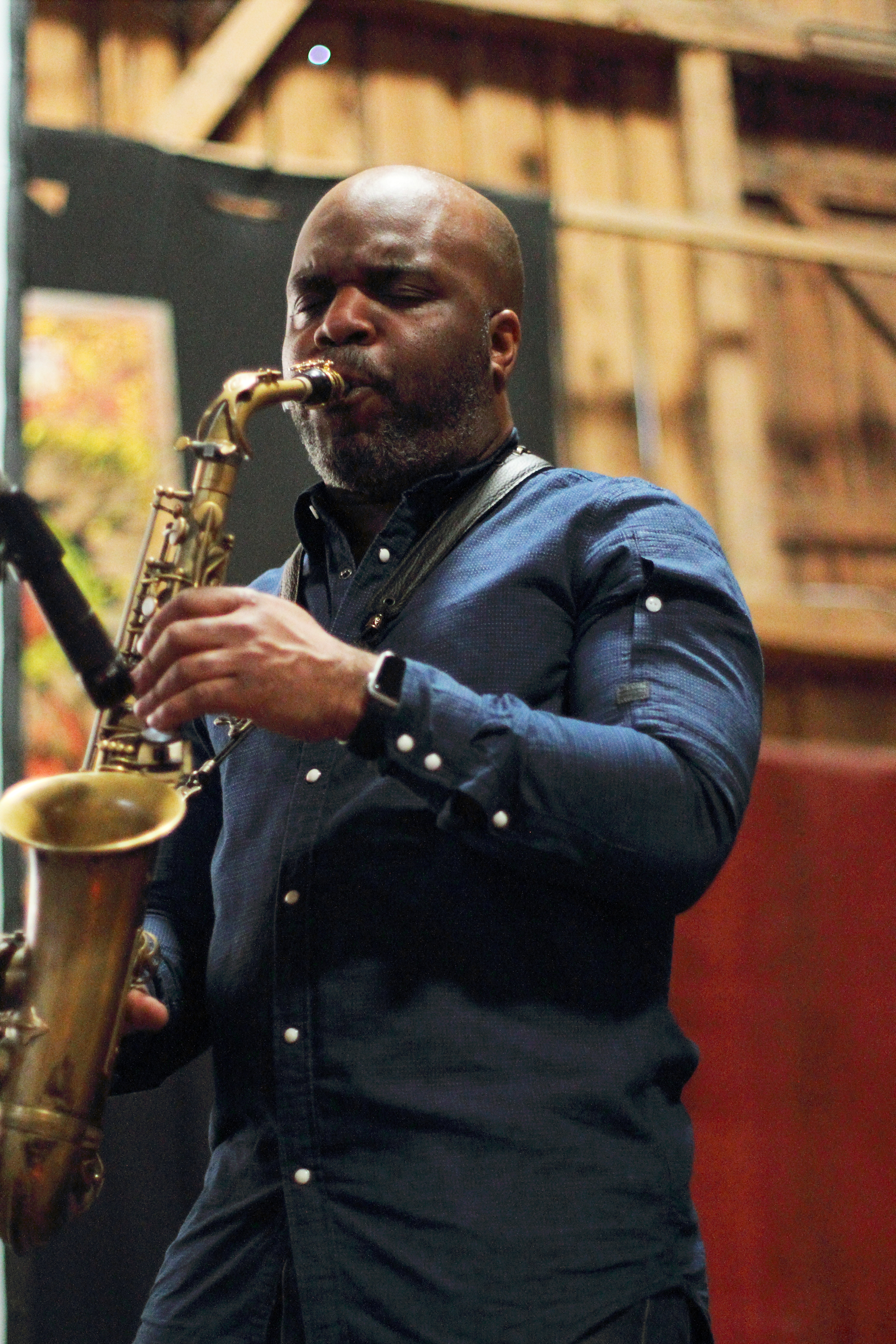
- With Jaimeo Brown Transcendence at INNtöne Jazzfestival on May 19, 2018

Background information
- Born: February 11, 1978; Philadelphia, Pennsylvania, U.S.
- Genres: Jazz
- Occupation: Musician
- Instrument: Saxophone
- Years active: 2002–present
- Labels: Fresh Sound, Changu
- Member of: Mingus Big Band
- Formerly of: World Saxophone Quartet, Roy Haynes

Jaleel Shaw (born February 11, 1978) is an American jazz alto saxophonist.

== Biography ==
Raised in Philadelphia, Pennsylvania, Shaw attended Greene Street Friends School, the Philadelphia High School for the Creative and Performing Arts and graduated from George Washington High School (Philadelphia).

He received a dual degree in Music Education and Performance in 2000 from Berklee College of Music in Boston, Massachusetts. He subsequently attended the Manhattan School of Music in New York City, from which he received a master's degree in Jazz Performance in May 2002. He was a finalist in the Thelonious Monk International Jazz Saxophone Competition that year. In 2008 he was awarded ASCAP's 2008 Young Jazz Composer Award.

Shaw released his first CD, Perspective in 2005. It was reviewed as one of the top debut albums of that year by All About Jazz and was deemed a "convincing opening statement in what promises to be an important career". In 2006 Shaw played as a member of the World Saxophone Quartet, appearing on their album Political Blues. Shaw released his sophomore recording, Optimism, in 2008, followed by Soundtrack of Things to Come in 2013. Echoes, released in 2021, features solo alto and soprano saxophones with added electronic effects. In 2025 he released Painter of the Invisible, his first album with a full band since 2013.

Jaleel Shaw is a member of the Mingus Big Band. Shaw performed with Roy Haynes' band for 14 years.

== Discography ==
=== As leader ===
Year recorded	Title	Label	Personnel/Notes
2005	Perspective	Fresh Sound	Sextet, with Mark Turner (tenor saxophone), Lage Lund (guitar), Robert Glasper (piano), Vicente Archer (bass), and Johnathan Blake (drums)
2008	Optimism	Changu	Sextet, with Lage Lund (guitar), Robert Glasper (piano), Joe Martin (bass), and Jeremy Pelt (trumpet), Johnathan Blake (drums)
2013	Soundtrack of Things to Come	Changu	Quartet, with Lawrence Fields (piano), Boris Kozlov (bass), and Johnathan Blake (drums)
2021	Echoes	Changu	Solo alto and soprano saxophones
2025	Painter of the Invisible	Changu	Most tracks quartet, with Lawrence Fields (piano), Ben Street (bass), and Joe Dyson (drums)

=== As sideman ===
Year recorded	Leader	Title	Label
2017	Nate Smith	Kinfolk: Postcards from Everywhere	Ropadope
2013	Tom Harrell	Colors of a Dream	HighNote
2011	Roy Haynes	Roy-Alty	Dreyfus
2011	Ben Williams	State of Art	Concord
2006	Roy Haynes	Whereas	Dreyfus
