= Lage Lund =

Norwegian jazz guitarist (born 1977)

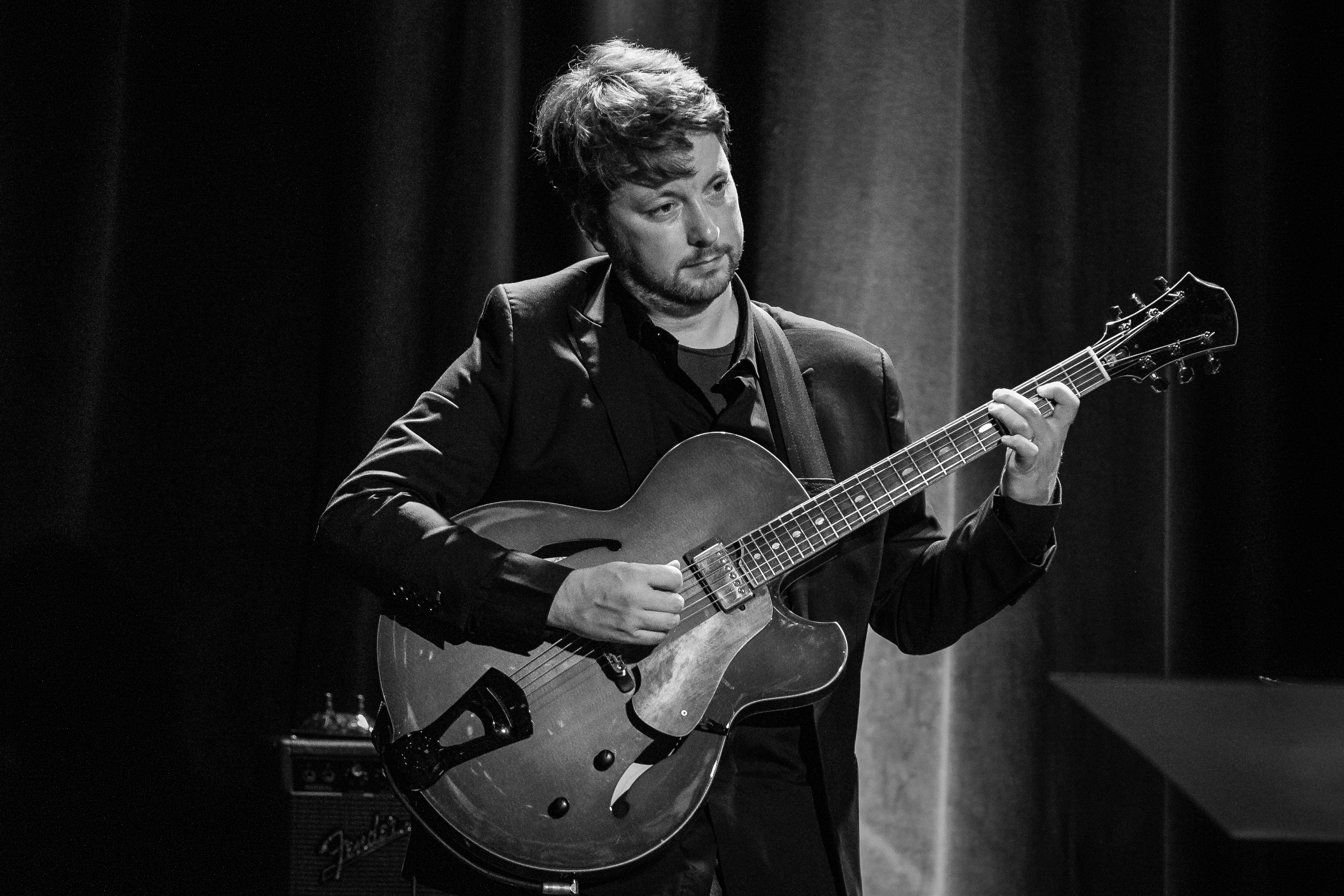
- Lage Lund performing in 2020

Background information
- Born: 12 December 1977 (age 48); Skien, Telemark, Norway
- Genre: Jazz
- Occupation: Musician
- Instrument: Guitar
- Labels: Criss Cross, Losen
- Website: www.lagelund.com

Lage Fosheim Lund (born 12 December 1977) is a Norwegian jazz guitarist who lives in New York.

== Early life and education ==
Initially aspiring to become a professional skateboarder, Lund began playing guitar at the age of 13. He later founded a jazz trio and performing in local clubs. Lund earned a scholarship and attended the Berklee College of Music in Boston, where he regularly performed at Wally's Cafe. In 2002, Lund was the recipient of a Fulbright Foundation grant, which gave him the opportunity to move to New York City. In 2003, he entered the Juilliard School scholarship jazz program and graduated in 2005. He won the Thelonious Monk International Jazz Competition in 2005.

== Career ==
Lund has performed at Smalls Jazz Club, Jazz Gallery, Blues Alley, Kennedy Center, and Jazz at Lincoln Center. He has worked with Seamus Blake, Ingrid Jensen, Carmen Lundy, Wynton Marsalis, Eric Revis, Ron Carter, Mulgrew Miller, and Maria Schneider.

== Honors ==
- 2005: Winner of the Thelonious Monk International Jazz Guitar Competition

== Discography ==
=== As leader ===
- Romantic Latino for Ladies (Leafage, 2006)
- Standards with Lage Lund Trio +1 (Pony Canyon, 2007)
- Early Songs (Criss Cross, 2008)
- Unlikely Stories (Criss Cross, 2010)
- Four (Smallslive, 2012)
- OWL Trio (Losen, 2013)
- Foolhardy (Criss Cross, 2013)
- Idlewild (Criss Cross, 2015)
- Inspired with Rale Micic, John Abercrombie, Peter Bernstein (ArtistShare, 2016)
- Terrible Animals (Criss Cross, 2019)
- Life of the Party with OWL Trio (Newvelle, 2020)
- Ashes (JMI Recordings, 2023)

=== As sideman ===
- Seamus Blake, Way Out Willy (Criss Cross, 2007)
- Seamus Blake, Bellwether (Criss Cross, 2009)
- Seamus Blake, Live at Smalls (Smallslive, 2010)
- Zach Brock, Purple Sounds (Criss Cross, 2014)
- Orlando le Fleming, From Brooklyn with Love (Nineteen-Eight, 2010)
- Jimmy Greene, Mission Statement (Razdaz, Sunnyside 2009)
- Jimmy Greene, While Looking Up (Mack Avenue, 2020)
- Ingrid Jensen, At Sea (ArtistShare, 2005)
- Carmen Lundy, Come Home (Afrasia, 2007)
- Michael Rosen, Sweet 17 (Via Veneto, 2015)
- Jochen Rueckert, We Make the Rules (Whirlwind, 2014)
- David Sanchez, Cultural Survival (Concord Picante, 2008)
- Maria Schneider, The Thompson Fields (ArtistShare, 2015)
- Jaleel Shaw, Perspective (Fresh Sound, 2005)
- Jaleel Shaw, Optimism (Changu, 2008)
- Leo Sidran, Cool School (Bonsai Music, 2018)
- Chihiro Yamanaka, Somethin' Blue (Blue Note, 2014)
- Melissa Aldana, 12 Stars (Blue Note, 2022)
