= LaVerne Butler =

- Born: Shreveport, Louisiana, U.S.
- Genres: Vocal jazz
- Occupation: Singer
- Years active: 1990s–present
- Labels: Chesky, Maxjazz, HighNote

LaVerne Butler is an American jazz singer.

Butler was born in Shreveport, Louisiana, the daughter of saxophonist Scott Butler, and was exposed to jazz and rhythm and blues music. She attended the University of New Orleans. She worked in local clubs as a singer, including with New Orleans jazz veterans Ellis Marsalis and Alvin Batiste. She moved to New York City and worked as an English teacher while singing in clubs. She studied with another jazz veteran, singer Jon Hendricks. In the 1990s she recorded two albums for Chesky Records.

== Critical reception ==
She released two albums on Chesky Records to critical approval from 1992–1994.

== Discography ==
- No Looking Back (Chesky, 1992)
- Day Dreamin' (Chesky, 1994)
- Blues in the City (Maxjazz, 1999)
- A Foolish Thing to Do (Maxjazz, 2001)
- Love Lost and Found Again (HighNote, 2012)
