= Tom Harrell =

American jazz musician, composer, and arranger (b. 1946)

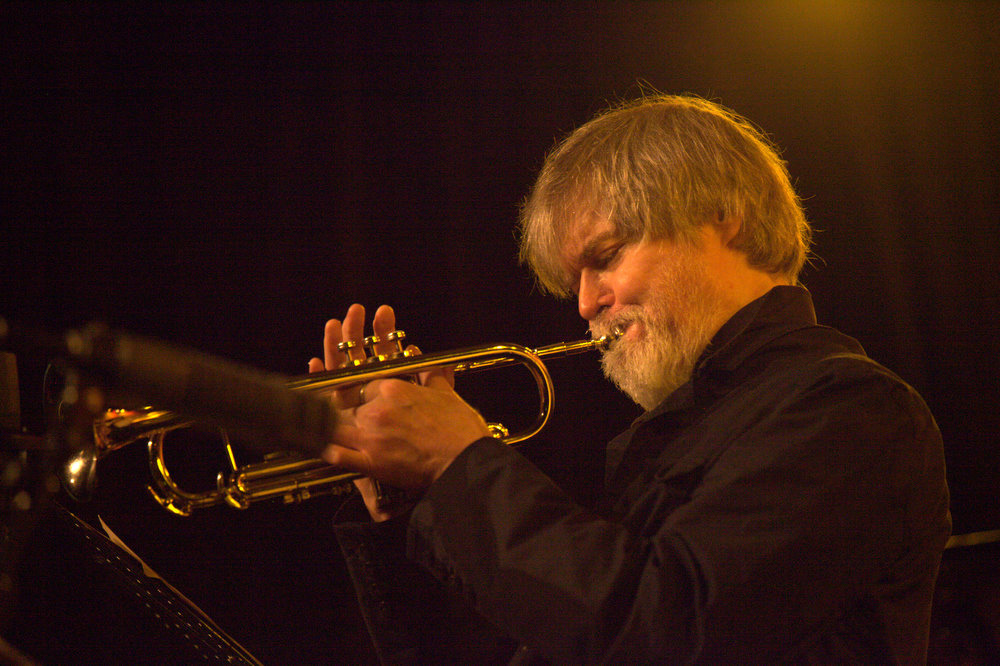
- Harrell performing in 2011

Background information
- Born: June 16, 1946 (age 80); Urbana, Illinois, U.S.
- Genre: Jazz
- Occupation: Musician
- Instruments: Trumpet, flugelhorn
- Years active: 1969–present
- Labels: Contemporary, Chesky, RCA, High Note
- Website: tomharrell.com

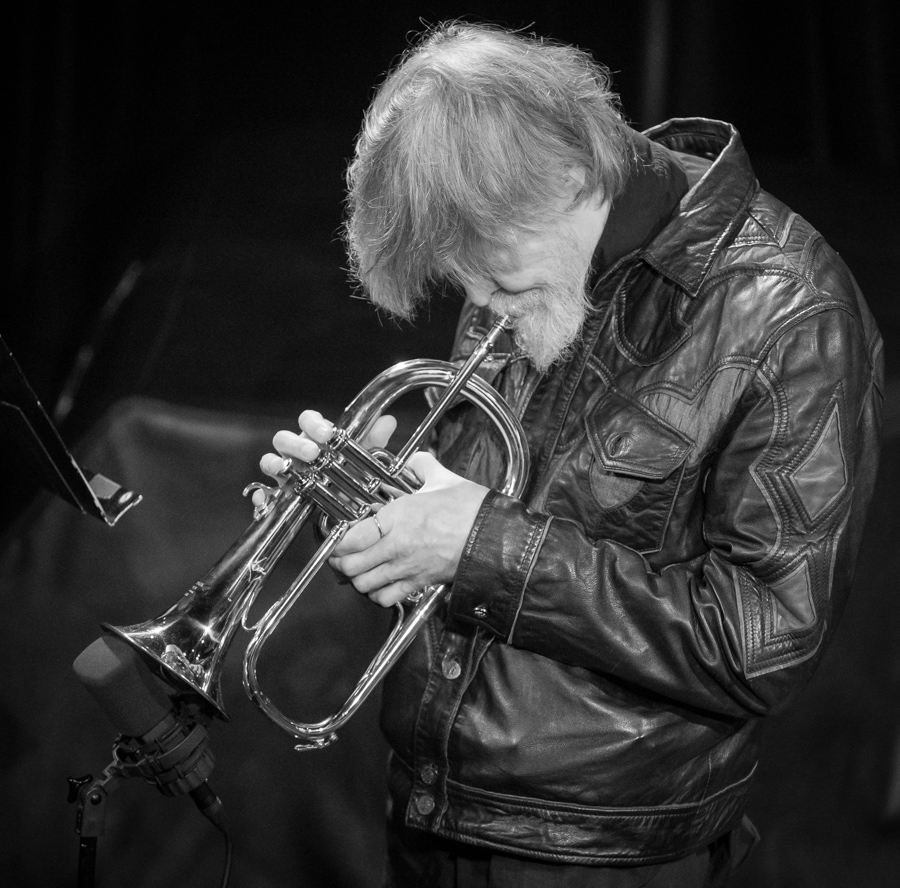
Tom Harrell at the 2017 Oslo Jazz Festival

Tom Harrell (born June 16, 1946) is an American jazz trumpeter, flugelhornist, composer, and arranger. Voted Trumpeter of the Year of 2018 by Jazz Journalists Association, Harrell has won awards and grants throughout his career, including multiple Trumpeter of the Year awards from DownBeat magazine, SESAC Jazz Award, BMI (Broadcast Music Incorporated) Composers Award, and Prix Oscar du Jazz. He received a Grammy Award nomination for his big band album, Time's Mirror.

== Biography ==
Tom Harrell was born in Urbana, Illinois, United States, but moved to the San Francisco Bay Area at the age of five. He started playing trumpet at eight, and within five years he was playing gigs with local bands. In 1969 he graduated from Stanford University with a music composition degree and joined Stan Kenton's orchestra, touring and recording with them throughout 1969. Harrell pursued his musical career despite experiencing symptoms of schizophrenia since he was an adolescent.

After leaving Kenton, Harrell played with Woody Herman's big band (1970–1971), Azteca (1972), the Horace Silver Quintet (1973–1977), with whom he made five albums, the Sam Jones-Tom Harrell Big Band, the Lee Konitz Nonet (1979–1981), George Russell, and the Mel Lewis Orchestra (1981). From 1983 to 1989, he was a pivotal member of the Phil Woods Quintet and made seven albums with the group.

In addition, he performed with Vince Guaraldi on the Peanuts television specials You're Not Elected, Charlie Brown (1972), There's No Time for Love, Charlie Brown, A Charlie Brown Thanksgiving (both 1973) and It's a Mystery, Charlie Brown (1974).

Harrell also performed with Bill Evans, Dizzy Gillespie, Jim Hall, Ronnie Cuber, Bob Brookmeyer, Lionel Hampton, Bob Berg, Cecil Payne, Bobby Shew, Philip Catherine, Ivan Paduart, Joe Lovano, Charlie Haden's Liberation Orchestra, Charles McPherson, David Sánchez, Sheila Jordan, Jane Monheit, the King's Singers and Kathleen Battle among others. Harrell is featured on Bill Evans' final studio recording, We Will Meet Again, which won a Grammy Award for Best Instrumental Jazz Performance, Group.

While Harrell recorded several albums as a leader during his tenure with the Phil Woods Quintet, it was after his departure that he started producing albums as a leader, in succession for Contemporary Records (now owned by Concord), Chesky, and RCA/BMG. During his years as a BMG artist (1996–2003) first with RCA, then Bluebird and finally Arista, Harrell made six albums, many of which feature his arrangements for larger groups. Since the early 1990s, Harrell has toured and performed with his own groups of various sizes and instrumentation.

Harrell is a prolific arranger and composer. He has arranged for Vince Guaraldi's work on Peanuts, Carlos Santana, the Metropole Orchestra, the Danish Radio Big Band, the Vanguard Jazz Orchestra, and Elisabeth Kontomanou with the Orchestre National de Lorraine, among others. His compositions have been recorded by other jazz artists including Ron Carter, Kenny Barron, Art Farmer, Chris Potter, Tom Scott, Steve Kuhn, Kenny Werner and Hank Jones. Harrell's composition and big band arrangement entitled "Humility" was recorded on the Grammy-winning album by Arturo O'Farrill's Afro-Latin Jazz Orchestra, Song for Chico. As a composer and arranger, Harrell works in different genres, including classical music.

== Tom Harrell Quintet ==
Since 1989 Harrell has led his own groups, usually quintets but occasionally expanded ensembles such as chamber orchestras with strings, and big bands. He has appeared at most major jazz clubs and festival venues, and recorded under his own name for such record labels as RCA, Contemporary, Pinnacle, Blackhawk, Criss Cross, SteepleChase, Chesky, and HighNote.

From 1994 to 1996, the quintet contained Don Braden, Kenny Werner, Larry Grenadier, and Billy Hart. From 2000 to 2005, it contained Jimmy Greene, Xavier Davis, Ugonna Okegwo, and Quincy Davis.

In contrast to his signature recordings during the RCA/BMG years (1996–2003), where much of his focus was on projects involving large ensembles, big bands and chamber orchestras, Harrell's more recent works demonstrate his skills as a leader of a tight, smaller unit. Harrell's later quintet of tenor saxophonist Wayne Escoffery, pianist Danny Grissett, bassist Ugonna Okegwo (who has performed with Harrell since 1997), and drummer Johnathan Blake, was noted for the strong chemistry between the musicians and the distinctive sound achieved primarily through Harrell's compositions. It recorded five albums for HighNote: Light On, Prana Dance, Roman Nights, The Time of the Sun, and Number Five. For the last of these, Harrell received his seventh SESAC Jazz Award.

== Tom Harrell Chamber Ensemble ==
In June 2012, Harrell debuted his nine-piece chamber ensemble at the Highline Ballroom as part of the Blue Note Jazz Festival. Harrell arranged the music of Debussy, Ravel, and his own compositions for this ensemble, which consists of trumpet, soprano and tenor saxophones, c-flute and bass flute, violin, cello, acoustic guitar, piano, bass, and drums. The Tom Harrell Chamber Ensemble has since performed at the Village Vanguard, Autumn Jazz Festival in Bielsko Biala, the Jazz Standard, the Xerox Rochester International Jazz Festival, the Scripps Auditorium in San Diego, and Soka University Performing Arts Center in Aliso Viejo, CA. Harrell considers the arrangements and compositions some of the most challenging works he has written to date.

== Colors of a Dream ==
In 2013, Harrell formed a piano-less sextet with two basses called Colors of a Dream, which comprises Harrell on trumpet and flugelhorn, Wayne Escoffery on tenor saxophone, Jaleel Shaw on alto saxophone, Johnathan Blake on drums, Ugonna Okegwo on bass and Esperanza Spalding doubling on bass and vocal. The group debuted at the Village Vanguard during its six-night run starting March 26, 2013 and the second night's performance was webcast for live streaming by NPR. A studio album by the same name was released on October 22, 2013, for which Harrell received his eighth SESAC Jazz Awards the following year.

== TRIP ==
Harrell also recorded with TRIP, a piano-less quartet featuring saxophonist Mark Turner, bassist Ugonna Okegwo and drummer Adam Cruz in 2013. The group first performed in Rochester, New York, and at the Jazz Standard during Dave Douglas' Festival of New Trumpet Music (FONT) in October 2012. Harrell premiered the suite with six sections he wrote specifically for this group. TRIP reconvened a year later at the Village Vanguard and made a studio recording the following week. The quartet released the self-titled album TRIP on August 12, 2014.

== Publications ==
Harrell's work as composer and jazz soloist has been published in books by Hal Leonard, Jamey Aebersold, Sher Music, and Gerard and Sarzin.

== Discography ==
=== As leader ===
- Aurora (1976, reissued as Total, 1987)
- Mind's Ear (1978)
- Play of Light (Palo Alto, 1982)
- Moon Alley (Criss Cross, 1985)
- Sundance (1986) with George Robert
- Open Air (SteepleChase, 1987)
- Stories (Contemporary, 1988)
- Sail Away (Contemporary,1989)
- Lonely Eyes (GPR Records, 1989) with George Robert
- Form (Contemporary, 1990)
- Visions (Contemporary, 1991)
- Sail Away (Musidisc, 1991)
- Passages (Chesky, 1991)
- Moon and Sand (Jazz Aux Remparts, 1991) with Jacky Terrasson
- Upswing (Chesky, 1993)
- Cape Verde (Mons, 1995) with George Robert
- Labyrinth (RCA Victor, 1996)
- The Art of Rhythm (RCA Victor, 1998)
- Time's Mirror (RCA Victor, 1999)
- Paradise (RCA Victor, 2001)
- Live at the Village Vanguard (Bluebird, 2002)
- Wise Children (Bluebird, 2003; recorded 1993)
- The Auditorium Session (Parco Della Musica Records, 2008; recorded 2005)
- Light On (HighNote, 2007)
- Prana Dance (HighNote, 2009)
- Roman Nights (HighNote, 2010)
- The Time of the Sun (HighNote, 2011)
- Number Five (HighNote, 2012)
- Colors of a Dream (HighNote, 2013)
- Trip (HighNote, 2014)
- First Impressions (HighNote, 2015; recorded 2013)
- Something Gold, Something Blue (HighNote, 2016)
- Moving Picture (HighNote, 2017)
- Infinity (HighNote, 2019)
- Oak Tree (HighNote, 2022; recorded 2020)
- Alternate Summer (HighNote, 2024)

=== As co-leader ===
With Art Farmer

- The Company I Keep (Arabesque, 1994)

With John McNeil

- Look to the Sky (SteepleChase, 1979)

With Dado Moroni

- Humanity (Abeat Records, 2007)

=== As sideman ===
With Vince Guaraldi

- You're Not Elected, Charlie Brown (soundtrack) (Lee Mendelson Film Productions, 1972)
- There's No Time for Love, Charlie Brown (1973)
- A Charlie Brown Thanksgiving (soundtrack) (Lee Mendelson Film Productions, 1973)
- It's a Mystery, Charlie Brown (soundtrack) (Lee Mendelson Film Productions, 1974)

With Charlie Haden

- Dream Keeper (Verve, 1990)
- The Montreal Tapes: Liberation Music Orchestra (Verve, 1999)

With Mike LeDonne

- 'Bout Time (Criss Cross, 1988)
- The Feeling of Jazz (Criss Cross, 1990)

With Joe Lovano

- Village Rhythm (Soul Note, 1988)
- Quartets: Live at the Village Vanguard (Blue Note, 1994)

With Mark Murphy

- Satisfaction Guaranteed (Muse, 1980)
- The Artistry of Mark Murphy (Muse, 1982)
- The Latin Porter - Featuring Tom Harrell (Go Jazz, 2000)

With Horace Silver

- Silver 'n Brass (Blue Note, 1975)
- Silver 'n Wood (Blue Note, 1976)
- Silver 'n Voices (Blue Note, 1976)
- Silver 'n Percussion (Blue Note, 1977)
- Silver 'n Strings Play the Music of the Spheres (Blue Note, 1979)

With Phil Woods

- Integrity (Red, 1984)
- Gratitude (Denon, 1986)
- Dizzy Gillespie Meets Phil Woods Quintet (Timeless, 1986)
- Bop Stew (Concord, 1987)
- Evolution (Concord, 1988)
- Flash (Concord, 1989)
- Bouquet (Concord, 1989)

With others

- Ben Aronov, Shadow Box (Choice, 1979)
- Don Braden, The Time Is Now (Criss Cross, 1991)
- Gordon Brisker, Cornerstone (Sea Breeze, 1984)
- Donald Brown, People Music (Muse, 1990)
- Thomas Chapin, You Don't Know Me (Arabesque, 1995)
- Harold Danko, Coincidence (Dreamstreet, 1979)
- Bill Evans, We Will Meet Again (Verve, 1979)
- George Gruntz, Theatre (ECM, 1983)
- Jim Hall, These Rooms (Denon, 1988)
- Shinobu Itoh, Sailing Rolling (1991)
- Ethan Iverson, Common Practice (ECM, 2019)
- Steve Kuhn, Seasons of Romance (Postcards, 1995)
- Lee Konitz, Yes, Yes, Nonet (SteepleChase, 1979)
- Charles McPherson, First Flight Out (Arabesque, 1994)
- Idris Muhammad, House of the Rising Sun (Kudu, 1976)
- Bob Mover, On the Move (Choice, 1978)
- Gerry Mulligan, Walk on the Water (DRG, 1980)
- Bobby Paunetto, Paunetto's Point (Pathfinder, 1975)
- Cecil Payne, Bird Gets the Worm (Muse, 1976)
- Steve Swallow, Real Book (Xtra Watt, 1993)
- Joris Teepe, Bottom Line with Don Braden, Darrell Grant, Carl Allen (Mons, 1996)

== See also ==
- List of jazz arrangers
