= Johnathan Blake =

American jazz musician (born 1976)

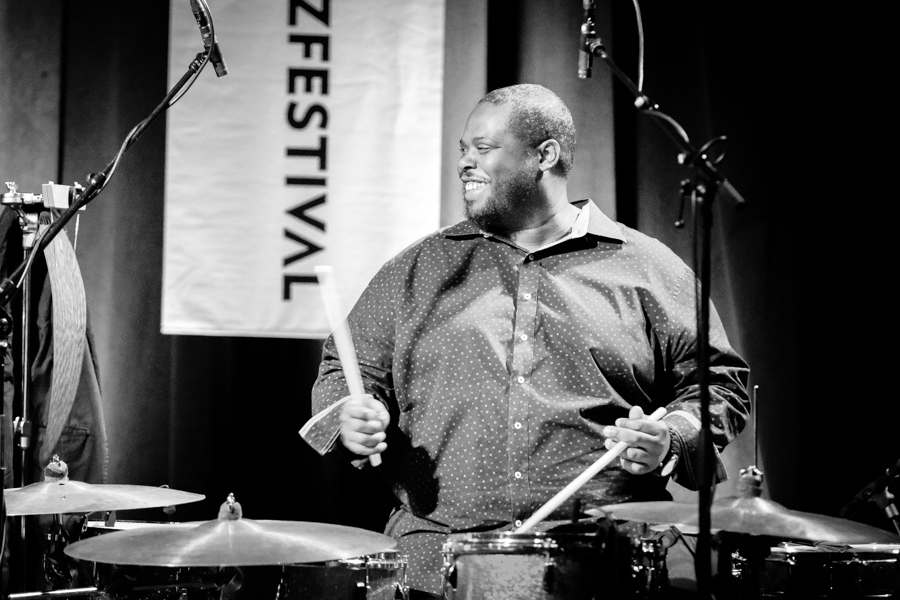
Johnathan Blake, Oslo Jazz Festival 2018

Johnathan Blake (born July 1, 1976, in Philadelphia) is an American jazz drummer.

== Biography ==
Johnathan Blake is the son of jazz violinist John Blake Jr. He started playing the drums when he was ten; He gained his first experience in his hometown in the Lovett Hines Youth Ensemble. After graduating from George Washington High School, he studied jazz at William Paterson University with Rufus Reid, John Riley, Steve Wilson and Horacee Arnold. During this time he began to work as a professional musician, among other things in the Oliver Lake Big Band, with Roy Hargrove and David Sánchez. In 2006, he received the ASCAP Young Composers Award; the following year he completed his studies with a master's in composition at Rutgers University (studied with Victor Lewis, Ralph Bowen, Conrad Herwig and Stanley Cowell).

His first recordings were made in 1996 by Norman Simmons; Blake then worked in the Mingus Big Band in the 2000s and appeared on their Grammy-nominated albums Tonight at Noon (2002) and I Am Three (2005). He also played with Ronnie Cuber, Russell Malone, Randy Brecker and Joe Locke, with whom he performed at JazzBaltica in 2009.

In 2012, Sunnyside Records released Blake's debut album The Eleventh Hour, which featured saxophonists Mark Turner and Jaleel Shaw. With Thomas Maintz and Scott Colley, he presented the joint album Present, which was followed in 2014 by his album Gone, But not Forgotten for Criss Cross Jazz and in 2019, by his double album Trion (with his trio with Chris Potter and Linda Oh). His album Homeward Bound was released on Blue Note in 2021, followed by his 2023 Blue Note release Passage, a tribute to the life and legacy of his late father. His latest album My Life Matters was released on Blue Note in September 2025. A suite of music he composed as a commission for The Jazz Gallery that serves as a dual treatise on the importance of family values and the social imperative to stand up in the face of injustice.

Blake recorded the album Brooklyn Jazz Session (2011) with musicians including Benjamin Koppel, Kenny Werner and Scott Colley. In 2018 he worked with Jonathan Kreisberg at Dr. Lonnie Smith's album All in My Mind (Blue Note). In 2019, he was a member of the Kálmán Oláh Quartet (with John Hébert and Tim Ries), and also in the Oded Tzur quartet. He can also be heard on recordings by Omer Avital, George Colligan, Wayne Escoffery, Tom Harrell, Brian Lynch, Donny McCaslin, Monday Michiru, Alex Sipiagin, Jack Walrath, Maria Schneider, and Greg Abate (Magic Dance: The Music of Kenny Barron). In the field of jazz, Blake participated in 72 recording sessions between 1996 and 2020.
