= Joe Fields (producer) =

American producer and record executive

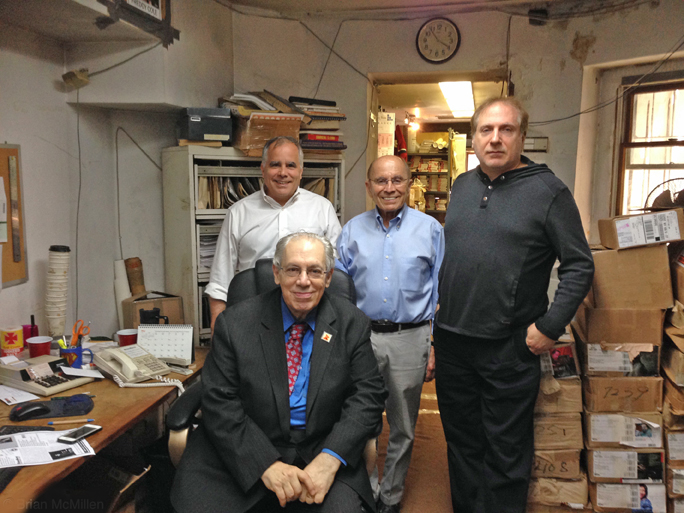
- High Note Records office in New York City, June 2014. Standing, l-r: Barney Fields, Joe Fields, trumpeter David Weiss. Seated: Producer Todd Barkan.

Background information
- Born: 1929; Jersey City, New Jersey
- Died: July 12, 2017 (aged 88)
- Genres: Jazz
- Occupations: Record producer, executive
- Labels: Prestige, Cobblestone, Muse, Onyx, HighNote, Savant

Joe Fields (1929 – July 12, 2017) was an American producer and record executive, active mainly in jazz music.

Fields was born in Jersey City, New Jersey, in 1929. He worked for Prestige Records as an executive in the 1960s. He and producer Don Schlitten cofounded Cobblestone Records, a subsidiary of Buddah Records, in 1972, and soon after founded Muse Records and its sister label Onyx Records. Schlitten split with Fields in 1978 to found the Xanadu label, after which Fields held sole control of Muse. Fields later sold Muse to Joel Dorn, who has released much of Muse's back catalog under the label 32 Jazz. Fields also owned the rights to the Savoy Records catalog for a time in the 1980s, having purchased the catalog from Arista Records, and subsequently selling it to Denon. (As of 2009, the library is controlled and distributed in the U.S. through Tokyo's Columbia Music Entertainment wholly owned Savoy Jazz label (the current owner of the Savoy Records masters.)

Fields and his son Barney Fields co-founded HighNote Records and Savant Records in 1996, which are still actively recording and issuing jazz. The HighNote roster is made up of many of the mainstay Muse artists, like Houston Person, Joey DeFrancesco, and Wallace Roney.

Fields died on July 12, 2017, at the age of 88.
