= Wayne Escoffery =

American jazz saxophonist (born 1975)

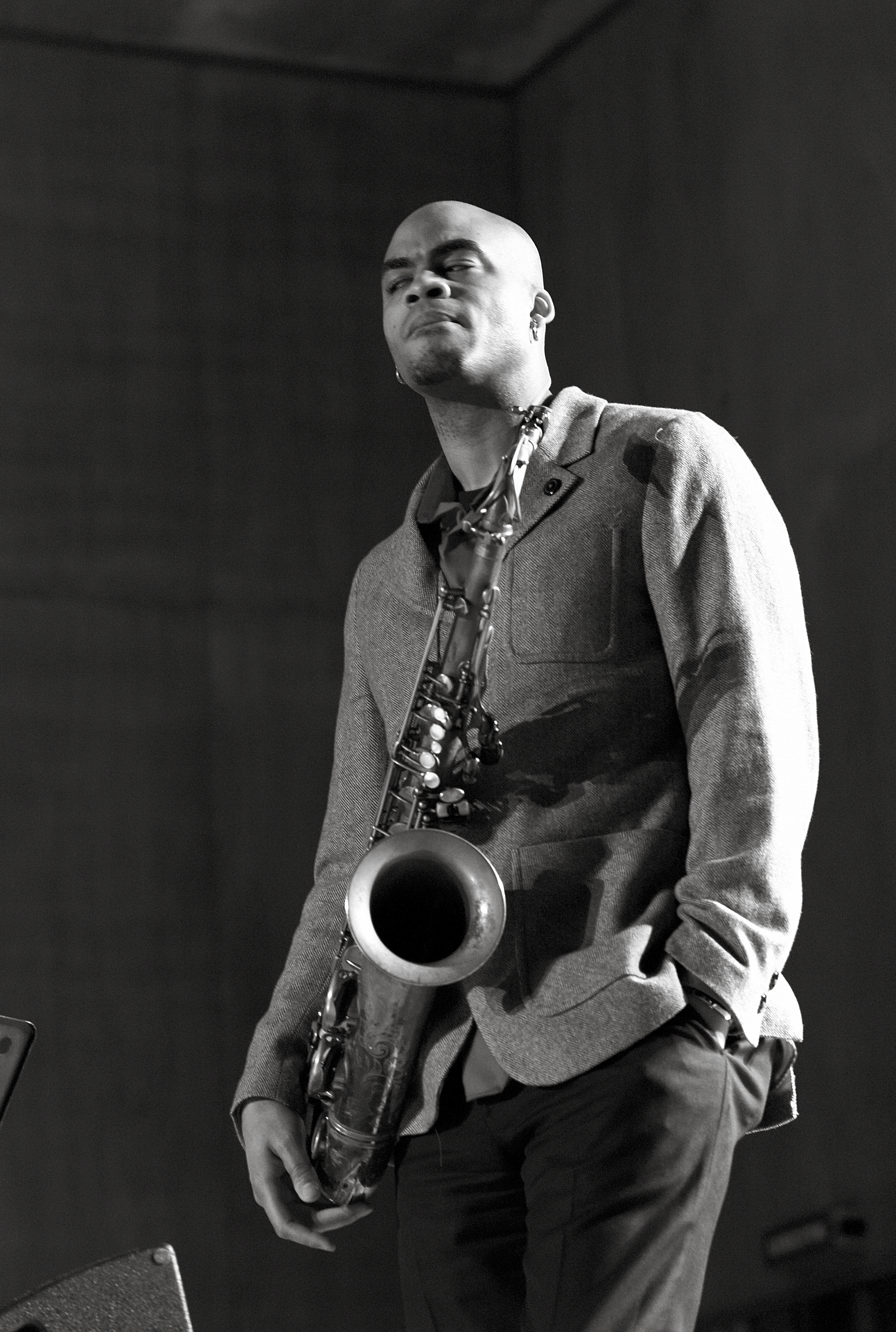
- Escoffery in 2008

Background information
- Born: February 23, 1975 (age 51); London, England
- Genre: Jazz
- Occupation: Musician
- Instrument: Tenor saxophone
- Formerly of: Mingus Big Band
- Website: wayneescoffery.com

Wayne Escoffery (born 23 February 1975) is an American jazz tenor saxophonist.

== Performing history ==
Since 2000, he has been working in New York City with Carl Allen, Eric Reed, and the Mingus Big Band. Other musicians performed with include Ralph Peterson Jr., Ben Riley, Ron Carter, Rufus Reid, Bill Charlap, Bruce Barth, Jimmy Cobb, and Eddie Henderson. He has worked with vocalists including Mary Stallings, Cynthia Scott, Nancie Banks, LaVerne Butler, and Carolyn Leonhart. In addition to performing with his own Quartet featuring David Kikoski, Ugonna Okegwo, and Ralph Peterson, Escoffery currently performs and tours with Ben Riley's Monk Legacy Septet, the Mingus Band, Ron Carter's big band, Monty Alexander, Amina Figarova, and others. He has been a member of the Tom Harrell Quintet since 2006. He has also co-produced four of Harrell's latest recordings.

== Biography ==
Born in London, Wayne and his mother Patricia Escoffery emigrated to the United States and settled in New Haven, Connecticut, in 1986. He attended ACES Educational Center for the Arts high school.

At age eleven, Escoffery joined the New Haven Trinity Boys Choir and began taking saxophone lessons from Malcolm Dickinson. At sixteen, he left the choir and began a more intensive study of the saxophone, attending the Jazzmobile in New York City, the Neighborhood Music School in New Haven, and the ACES Educational Center for the Arts in New Haven. During his senior year in high School, he attended the Artists Collective, Inc. in Hartford, Connecticut. He met Jackie McLean, a well-known alto saxophonist active in Hartford's jazz scene, and the founder of the jazz program at The Hartt School.

Escoffery was awarded a full scholarship to attend The Hartt School, where he studied with McLean for four years, and earned a bachelor's degree in Jazz Performance summa cum laude in 1997. He then attended the Thelonious Monk Institute of Jazz Performance at the New England Conservatory in Boston from 1997 to 1999. During this time, he toured with Herbie Hancock and performed and studied with several jazz greats. In 1999, he graduated with a master's degree and moved to New York to begin his professional career.

Escoffery married singer Carolyn Leonhart in 2004. As of 2020, they are no longer married. Together they have one child, and have collaborated on many performances, and appear together on several albums.

In 2014, Escoffery won the 62nd Annual DownBeat Critics Poll for rising star on the tenor saxophone and in 2010 won a Grammy with the Mingus Big Band. In 2016, he was appointed Lecturer in Jazz Improvisation and Combo Instructor at the Yale School of Music.

== Discography ==
=== As leader ===
- Times Change (Nagel Heyer, 2001)
- Intuition (Nagel Heyer, 2004)
- Veneration (Savant, 2007)
- Hopes and Dreams (Savant, 2008)
- Uptown (Posi-Tone, 2009)
- The Only Son of One (Sunnyside, 2012)
- Live at Firehouse 12 (Sunnyside, 2014)
- Live at Smalls (SmallsLIVE, 2015)
- Vortex (Sunnyside, 2018)
- The Humble Warrior (Smoke Sessions, 2020)
- Like Minds (Smoke Sessions, 2023)
- Alone (Smoke Sessions, 2024)

=== As sideman ===
With Tom Harrell

- Light On (HighNote, 2007)
- Prana Dance (HighNote, 2009)
- Roman Nights (HighNote, 2010)
- The Time of the Sun (HighNote, 2011)
- Number Five (HighNote, 2012)
- Colors of a Dream (HighNote, 2013)
- First Impressions (HighNote, 2015)

With Black Art Jazz Collective

- Presented By The Side Door Jazz Club (Sunnyside, 2016)
- Armor of Pride (HighNote, 2018)
- Ascension (HighNote, 2020)
- Truth To Power (HighNote, 2024)

With others

- Monty Alexander, Wareika Hill: Rasta-Monk Vibrations (MACD, 2019)
- Nancie Banks, Out of It (GFI, 2001)
- Noah Baerman, Playdate (Posi-Tone, 2009)
- Pat Bianchi, Back Home (Doodlin, 2010)
- Pat Bianchi, Something To Say: The Music of Stevie Wonder (Savant, 2021)
- Steve Davis, Correlations (Smoke Sessions, 2019)
- Amina Figarova, Blue Whisper (In+Out, 2015)
- Amina Figarova, Road to the Sun (AmFi, 2018)
- John Hasselback III, Entrance (Hasselcastle, 2021)
- Frank Lacy, Mingus Sings (Sunnyside, 2015)
- Carolyn Leonhart, New 8th Day (Sunnyside, 2004)
- Carolyn Leonhart, If Dreams Come True (Nagel Heyer, 2007)
- Carolyn Leonhart, Tides of Yesterday (Savant, 2010)
- Joe Locke, Force of Four (Origin, 2008)
- Mingus Big Band, Tonight at Noon...Three or Four Shades of Love (Dreyfus, 2002)
- Mingus Big Band, I Am Three (Sue Mingus Music, 2005)
- Mingus Big Band, Live at Jazz Standard (Sue Mingus Music, 2010)
- Lonnie Plaxico, Rhythm & Soul (Sirocco Music, 2003)
- Eric Reed, Happiness (Nagel Heyer, 2001)
- Ben Riley, Memories of T (Concord Jazz, 2006)
- Ben Riley, Grown Folks Music (Sunnyside, 2012)
- Avi Rothbard, Twin Song (MidLantic, 2005)
- Avi Rothbard, Standard Solo And Duet Sketches (Rothbard Music/RM Records, 2016)
- Randy Sandke, Jazz for Juniors (Arbors, 2009)
- Joris Teepe, In the Spirit of Rashied Ali (Jazz Tribes, 2018)
- Akiko Tsuruga, NYC Serenade (Mojo [jp], 2008)
