= Minha Historia =

Compilation album by Magos Herrera
- Released: March 25, 2008; July 18, 2007
- Recorded: 2000, 2003, 2005
- Genre: Latin jazz, Latin pop
- Label: Casser Brasil, Jm Distribuidores

Magos Herrera chronology
Soliluna (2006)	Minha Historia (2008)	Distancia (2009)

Singles from Minha Historia
- 1. "Como Un Poeta" Released: February 2000; 2. "Orquideas Susurrantes" Released: February 2000; 3. "Agua" Released: August 2003; 4. "Somos" Released: August 2003; 5. "Todo Puede Inspirar" Released: July 2005

Minha Historia (In English: My History), it's a Brazilian Compilation album by the Latin jazz Mexican singer Magos Herrera. Released on March 25, 2008, in the United States and July 18, 2007, in Brazil, the compilation album includes song from her previous albums Orquideas Susurrantes, Pais Maravilla and Todo Puede Inspirar.

== Background and theme ==
The Mexican singer and composer Magos Herrera release its first disc released in Brazil. Minha Historia is a compilation of his three previously works "Orquideas Susurrantes", "Pais Maravilla" and "Todo Puede Inspirar".

Bring own songs and readings that show great sensitivity to express themes such as love and human relationships in general. Very observant, Magos is easy to capture in his music of everyday situations.

Besides the album was released for the Brazilian Market, only was include one song in Portugues, Pra Dizer Adeus of Edu Lobo and Ruy Guerra.

== Track listing ==
1. "Como Un Poeta" (Like A Poet)^{1}
2. "Orquideas Susurrantes" (Whispering Orchids)^{1}
3. "Agua" (Water)^{2}
4. "Somos" (We Are)^{2}
5. "Pais Maravilla" (Wonderland)^{2}
6. "Necesito Un Sol" (Need A Sun)^{2}
7. "Son Cotidiano" (Daily "Son")^{2}
8. "La Espera" (The Longing)^{2}
9. "Sol De Lisboa" (Lisboa's Sun)^{3}
10. "Santiago"^{3}
11. "Blanca Pasarela" (White Gateway)^{3}
12. "Pra Dizer Adeus"^{3}
13. "Todo Puede Inspirar" (Anything Can Inspire)^{3}

^{1} taken from the album Orquideas Susurrantes
^{2} taken from the album Pais Maravilla
^{3} taken from the album Todo Puede Inspirar
