= Sunnyside Records =

American jazz record company and label

- Founded: 1982
- Founder: François Zalacain
- Genre: Jazz
- Country of origin: U.S.
- Location: New York City
- Official website: sunnysiderecords.com

Sunnyside Records is an American jazz record company and label initially established by François Zalacain in 1982 to release an album by pianist Harold Danko. Albums by Kirk Lightsey and Lee Konitz soon followed, beginning a sequence of releases covering a cross-section of jazz, blues, classical, and world music.

== Discography ==
=== 1000 Series ===
Catalog No.	Album	Artist	Details
SSC1001	Mirth Song	Harold Danko	
SSC1002	Lightsey 1	Kirk Lightsey	
SSC1003	Dovetail	Lee Konitz	
SSC1004	Shorter by Two	Kirk Lightsey and Harold Danko	
SSC1005	Lightsey 2	Kirk Lightsey	
SSC1006	There's Gonna Be Trouble...	Jay Leonhart with Joe Beck	
SSC1007	Alter Ego	James Williams	
SSC1008	Ink and Water	Harold Danko	
SSC1009	Love Is Here	Roslyn Burrough	
SSC1010	Seven Minds	Rufus Reid Trio	
SSC1011	It's Your Dance	Meredith D'Ambrosio	
SSC1012	Progress Report	James Williams Sextet	
SSC1013	William the Conqueror	Billy Pierce Quartet	
SSC1014	Lightsey Live	Kirk Lightsey	
SSC1015	Sung Heroes	Tony Scott	featuring Bill Evans, Scott LaFaro and Paul Motian - recorded 1959
SSC1016	Simple Isn't Easy	Red Mitchell	
SSC1017	Another Time	Meredith D'Ambrosio	
SSC1018	Lost in His Arms	Meredith D'Ambrosio	Reissue of 1980 Spring LP
SSC1019	A Reverie: Solo Piano	Armen Donelian	
SSC1020	Everything Is Changed	Kirk Lightsey Quartet	
SSC1021	Hurricane	Rory Stuart Quartet	
SSC1022	Wind Inventions	Bill Easley	
SSC1023	Music for String Quartet, Jazz Trio, Violin and Lee Konitz	Pierre Blanchard	with Lee Konitz
SSC1024	Sarabande	Fred Hersch with Charlie Haden and Joey Baron	
SSC1025	Early Bird	Donald Brown	
SSC1026	Give and Take	Billy Pierce	
SSC1027	Perpetual Stroll	Rufus Reid Trio	
SSC1028	The Cove	Meredith D'Ambrosio	
SSC1029	Unspoken Words	Avery Sharpe	
SSC1030	Elusive	Glenn Wilson	
SSC1031	Secrets	Armen Donelian	
SSC1032	The Double Cross	Jay Leonhart	
SSC1033	Alone But Not Forgotten	Harold Danko	
SSC1034	Heaven Dance	The Leaders Trio	
SSC1035	Waiting in the Wings	Geoff Keezer	
SSC1036	Rumba Para Monk	Jerry González	
SSC1037	Equilateral	Billy Pierce	
SSC1038	Introducing the Trio	Kenny Werner	
SSC1039	South to a Warmer Place	Meredith D'Ambrosio	
SSC1040	Little Jazz Bird	Meredith D'Ambrosio	
SSC1041	Treasure Island	Bob Belden Ensemble	
SSC1042	Feliz	Jérôme Barde	
SSC1043	Corridor to the Limits	Rufus Reid	
SSC1044	Full Nelson	Steve Nelson	
SSC1045	Curveball	Geoff Keezer	
SSC1046	Something Old Something New	Bobby Routch	
SSC1047	Heartsongs	Fred Hersch Trio	
SSC1048	Uncovered Heart	Kenny Werner	
SSC1049	The Wayfarer	Armen Donelian Sextet	
SSC1050	Earthdance	Jerry González and Fort Apache Band	
SSC1051	Love Is Not a Game	Meredith D'Ambrosio	
SSC1052	Those Quiet Days	Eddie Higgins	
SSC1053	One for Chuck	Billy Pierce	
SSC1054	I'm Not My Brother I'm Me	Freddie Cole	
SSC1055	Thunder and Rainbows	Jazz from Keystone	Kenny Kirkland, Charles Fambrough and Jeff "Tain" Watts
SSC1056	Press Enter	Kenny Werner Trio	
SSC1057	Bittersweet	Glenn Wilson	
SSC1058	Quest	John Blake	
SSC1059	At Night	Marc Copland	
SSC1060	Shadowland	Meredith D'Ambrosio	
SSC1061	Moliendo Café	Jerry González & the Fort Apache Band	
SSC1062	Changing Standards	Laszlo Gardony	
SSC1063	Sleep Warm	Meredith D'Ambrosio	
SSC1064	Zoot's Hymns	Eddie Higgins	
SSC1065	Rio (Ballads and Bossa Novas	Billy Pierce	
SSC1066	Beautiful Love	Fred Hersch and Jay Clayton	
SSC1067	New York Romance	Barney Wilen	
SSC1068	Ya Yo Me Curé	Jerry González	
SSC1069	Beware of Spring!	Meredith D'Ambrosio	
SSC1070	Aardvark Poses	Michael Leonhart	
SSC1071	Is That So?	Franck Amsallem	
SSC1072	Portrait In Black and White	Eddie Higgins	
SSC1073	Time for Love	John Doughten	
SSC1074	Blue Porpoise Avenue	Glenn Wilson	
SSC1075	Silent Passion	Meredith D'Ambrosio	
SSC1076	Circle Dancing	Jay Clayton	
SSC1077	Glub Glub Vol. 11	Michael Leonhart	
SSC1078	Echo of a Kiss	Meredith D'Ambrosio	
SSC1079	La Cigale	Bob Belden Ensemble	
SSC1080	Haunted Heart	Eddie Higgins	
SSC1081	Group 15 Plays Monk	Group 15	
SSC1082	Los Guachos II	Guillermo Klein	
SSC1083	Are You Happy Now	Yoshiaki Masuo	
SSC1084	Tribute to Chombo	Rumba Jazz	
SSC1085	Out of Nowhere	Meredith D'Ambrosio	
SSC1086	Steal the Moon	Carolyn Leonhart	
SSC1087	One Man's Blues	Glenn Wilson	
SSC1088	Wave: Grand Ideas Vol. 1	Armen Donelian	
SSC1089	Grand Ideas, Vol. 2: Mystic Heights	Armen Donelian	
SSC1090	Full Moon Music: Grand Ideas, Vol. 3	Armen Donelian	
SSC1091	The Poems of Elizabeth Bishop and Other Songs	Luciana Souza	
SSC1092	Speaking of Jobim	Eddie Higgins	
SSC1093	Behind Open Doors	Laszlo Gardony	
SSC1094	Buenas Noticias	Julio Padrón	
SSC1095	Silent Hearts	Eric Watson	
SSC1096	Brooklyn 2000	Jay Clayton	
SSC1097	Bein' Green	Donna Leonhart	
SSC1098	Sun Is Us	Deidre Rodman	
SSC1099	Los Guachos III	Guillermo Klein	
SSC1100	Brazilian Duos	Luciana Souza	
SSC1101	Love Is for the Birds	Meredith D'Ambrosio	
SSC1102	Slow	Michael Leonhart	
SSC1103	Beat Degeneration	Kenny Werner	
SSC1104	Hecho a Mano	Chano Domínguez	
SSC1105	Homage to Art	Ray Barretto	
SSC1106	The Gait Keeper	Rufus Reid	
SSC1107	Ever Before Ever After	Laszlo Gardony	
SSC1108	Songs & Lullabies	Fred Hersch and Norma Winstone	
SSC1109	Love Walked In	Steve Kuhn	
SSC1110	Minino Garay y Los Tambul del Sul	Minino Garay	
SSC1111	Luminescence	Tino Derado	
SSC1112	North and South	Luciana Souza	
SSC1113	When I Close My Eyes	Ann Dyer	
SSC1114	Mucho Corazon	Martirio	
SSC1115	Duo	César Camargo Mariano and Romero Lubambo	
SSC1116	Melodolodie	Jérôme Barde	
SSC1117	Like a Tree in the City	Laurent Coq	
SSC1118	Simple Stories	Deidre Rodman	
SSC1119	Global Motion	Marc Mommaas	
SSC1120	The Holy La	Steve Lacy	
SSC1121	Summer Times	Franck Amsallem	
SSC1122	Conversation	Dave Liebman Group	
SSC1123	Soundances	Diego Urcola	
SSC1124	Iman	Chano Domínguez	
SSC1125	Red Moon	Moutin Reunion Quartet	
SSC1126	Flor de Piel	Martirio	
SSC1127	Green Up Time	Ellen Zachos	
SSC1128	Megawatts	Jeff "Tain" Watts, Charles Fambrough and Kenny Kirkland	
SSC1129	Time Again: Brubeck Revisited Vol. 1	Joe Gilman	
SSC1130	Live/UK	Jason Lindner	
SSC1131	Places	Aaron Choulai	
SSC1132	Neruda	Luciana Souza	
SSC1133	(H)ombre	Jean Pierre Mas	
SSC1134	Fuller Nelson	Steve Nelson	
SSC1135	Jerry Gonzalez y Los Piratas del Flamenco	Jerry González	
SSC1136	Nights of Bradley's	Kirk Lightsey	
SSC1137	Adobe	Tony Malaby	
SSC1138	Chanson Flamenca	Various Artists	
SSC1139	New 8th Day	Carolyn Leonhart	
SSC1140	Time Again: Brubeck Revisited Vol. 2	Joe Gilman Trio	
SSC1141	Una Nave	Guillermo Klein	
SSC1142	Duos II	Luciana Souza	
SSC1144	Fodder on My Wings	Nina Simone	Reissue of 1982 Carrere album
SSC1146	Oceana	Ben Monder	
SSC1147	Blue Mongol	Roswell Rudd	
SSC1148	Baden Live a Bruxelles	Baden Powell	Recorded 1999
SSC1149	Twin Falls	Deidre Rodman and Steve Swallow	
SSC1150	Soar	Donny McCaslin	
SSC1151	Subways Songs	Metta Quintet	
SSC1152	Worlds	Aaron Goldberg	
SSC1153	Three Days of Rain	Bob Belden	Soundtrack
SSC1154	Acoplados	Martirio and Chano Domínguez	
SSC1155	Wonderful World	Guillaume de Chassy	
SSC1156	Dust	Ben Monder	Reissue of 1997 Arabesque album
SSC1157	Excavation	Ben Monder	Reissue of 2000 Arabesque album
SSC1158	MTO Volume 1	Steven Bernstein's Milllenial Territory Orchestra	
SSC1159	Wishing on the Moon	Meredith D'Ambrosio	
SSC1160	Sunnyside Twenty-Fifth Anniversary Volume 1	Various Artists	
SSC1161	Pianists on the Sunnyside	Various Artists	
SSC1162	Jazz on the Sunnyside	Various Artists	
SSC1163	Sunnyside Latin Side	Various Artists	
SSC1164	Sunnyside Voices	Various Artists	
SSC1166	Pogo	Jerome Sabbagh	
SSC1167	Roses	Bill McHenry	
SSC1168	Rediscovery	John McNeil and Bill McHenry	
SSC1169	In Pursuit	Donny McCaslin	
SSC1170	The Truth About Suffering	Jamie Leonhart	
SSC1171	Happy Apple Back on Top	Happy Apple	
SSC1172	Sungbird	Helen Sung	
SSC1174	El Espíritu Jíbaro	Roswell Rudd and Yomo Toro	
SSC1175	Pastorale	Steve Kuhn	
SSC1177	Filtros	Guillermo Klein	
SSC1178	The Growing Season	Rebecca Martin	
SSC1179	Panorama	Hans Glawischnig	
SSC1180	Film Noir	Carlos Franzetti	
SSC1181	Moss	Moss	
SSC1182	San Francisco	Fleurine	
SSC1183	I Am I Am	J. D. Allen Trio	
SSC1184	Flag Day	Adam Kolker	
SSC1185	Not for Piano	Francesco Tristano	
SSC1186	Tragicomic	Vijay Iyer	
SSC1187	Banshees	Scott DuBois	
SSC1188	Keep Your Heart Right	Roswell Rudd	
SSC1189	Out of the Circle	Alex Sipiagin	
SSC1190	Impressions	Claudio Roditi	Reissue of 2006 Groovin' High album
SSC1191	Provinciano	Fernando Huergo	
SSC1192	Vals de la 81st & Columbus	Adrián Iaies	
SSC1193	Solace	Jamie Baum	
SSC1194	Catalysis	Phil Markowitz	
SSC1196	All Fires the Fire	Brian Cullman	
SSC1197	Runaway	George Colligan	
SSC1198	The Peace of Wild Things	Jay Clayton	
SSC1199	Princess Sita	Dominique Di Piazza Trio	
SSC1200	For Dewey	Peter Delano	
SSC1201	Some Other Time	Greg Reitan	
SSC1202	Father's Day B'hash	Rakalam Bob Moses	
SSC1203	Free at First	Adam Glasser	
SSC1204	Bienvenida	Venissa Santi	
SSC1205	Quake	Mike Holober and the Gotham Jazz Orchestra	
SSC1206	Denny Zeitlin Trio in Concert	Denny Zeitlin	Featuring Buster Williams and Matt Wilson
SSC1207	Trombone Tribe	Roswell Rudd	
SSC1208	The Morning World	Chris Morrissey	
SSC1209	Embracing Voices	Jane Bunnett	
SSC1210	Calima	Diego Barber	
SSC1211	Naranjas Sobre la Nieve	Israel	
SSC1212	Senzo	Abdullah Ibrahim	
SSC1213	Sunny Voices	Various Artists	
SSC1214	Generations	Miles Okazaki	
SSC1215	Muse	Yaron Herman	
SSC1216	Simple Song	Ben Wendel	
SSC1217	Share	Baptiste Trotignon	
SSC1218	Declaration	Donny McCaslin	
SSC1219	Duos with Lee	Dan Tepfer with Lee Konitz	
SSC1221	Baritonality	Roger Rosenberg	
SSC1223	Fred Hersch Pays Jobim	Fred Hersch	
SSC1224	La Princesse et le Croque-Notes	Melanie Dahan	
SSC1225	Shine!	J. D. Allen Trio	
SSC1226	Come Together	George Colligan	
SSC1227	Revolutions	Jim Beard	
SSC1228	Jerry Gonzalez y el Comando de la Clave	Carlos Franzetti	
SSC1229	Indelicate	Dave King	
SSC1230	Mambo Tango	Carlos Franzetti	
SSC1231	Alma y Luna	Sofia Tosello	
SSC1232	Home	Aaron Goldberg	
SSC1233	Domador de Huellas	Guillermo Klein	
SSC1234	Ranu	Aaron Choulai	
SSC1235	Crossroads	Hemispheres	
SSC1236	Things to Come	Rez Abbasi	
SSC1237	In the Middle of It All	Melissa Walker	
SSC1238	Antibes	Greg Reitan	
SSC1239	Bem Aqui	Dadi	
SSC1240	Voyage	Federico Britos	
SSC1241	Com Voce	Margret	
SSC1242	Timshel	Dan Weiss Trio	
SSC1243	Reclamation	Stephan Crump with Rosetta Trio	
SSC1244	Ghosts of the Sun	Bill McHenry	
SSC1245	Bienestan	Aaron Goldberg and Guillermo Klein	
SSC1246	Deeper	Maria Neckam	
SSC1247	Bloom	Ben Monder and Bill McHenry	
SSC1248	West of Middle	Steve Cardenas	
SSC1249	Landmarc	Marc Mommaas	
SSC1250	A Christmas Eve in Paris: I Love Paris	Various Artists	
SSC1251	Bombella	Abdullah Ibrahim and WDR Big Band Cologne	
SSC1252	Black Hawk Dance	Scott DuBois	
SSC1253	Precipice	Denny Zeitlin	
SSC1254	Music for Nonet and Strings: Chamber Songs	Alan Ferber	
SSC1255	When I Was Long Ago	Rebecca Martin	
SSC1256	Snuck In	David Weiss & Point of Departure	
SSC1257	Absolute Zawinul	Absolute Ensemble	
SSC1258	A Child’s Smile	Adrián Iaies	
SSC1259	Enesco Re-Imagined	Lucian Ban	
SSC1260	In and Out of Love	Jay Clayton	
SSC1261	Snuck Out	David Weiss & Point of Departure	
SSC1262	American Dream	Taylor Haskins	
SSC1263	Going Express	Helen Sung	
SSC1264	Natural Selection	Rez Abbasi	
SSC1265	Five Pedals Deep	Dan Tepfer	
SSC1266	Quest for Freedom	Richie Beirach	
SSC1267	There’s a Storm Inside	Chico Pinheiro	
SSC1268	Chill Morn He Climb Jenny	John McNeil and Bill McHenry	
SSC1269	Thoroughfare	Rebecca Martin	
SSC1270	David Caceres	David Caceres	
SSC1271	Yes!	Aaron Goldberg	
SSC1272	The Choice	Diego Barber	
SSC1273	The Music of Paul Motian	Joel Harrison String Choir	
SSC1274	Ascension	Harriet Tubman	
SSC1275	Weightless	Becca Stevens	
SSC1276	Sotho Blue	Abdullah Ibrahim	
SSC1277	If the Past Seems So Bright	Jeremy Udden's Plainville	
SSC1278	Milestone	Adam Cruz	
SSC1279	The Incredible Honk	Roswell Rudd	
SSC1280	Victory!	J. D. Allen Trio	
SSC1281	Reflections	Adam Kolker	
SSC1282	Unified	Stan Killian	
SSC1283	Labyrinth: Solo Piano in Concert	Denny Zeitlin	
SSC1284	Goldberg Variations / Variations	Dan Tepfer	
SSC1285	By Myself	Meredith D'Ambrosio	
SSC1286	CaRREra	Guillermo Klein	
SSC1287	For Which It Stands	Cloning Americana	
SSC1288	Essentially Hermeto	Erik Charlston JazzBrazil	
SSC1289	Daybreak	Greg Reitan	
SSC1290	Good Old Light	Dave King Trucking Company	
SSC1291	Acrobat: Music for and by Dimitri Shostakovich	Michael Bates	
SSC1292	Distancia	Magos Herrera	
SSC1293	Ron Carter's Great Big Band	Ron Carter	
SSC1294	Seven Seas	Avishai Cohen	
SSC1296	Fuzzy Logic	Taylor Haskins	
SSC1297	Melody in a Dream	Laurent Coq and Miguel Zenón	
SSC1298	Dialogue	Laurent Coq	
SSC1299	Rayuela	Laurent Coq and Miguel Zenón	
SSC1300	Search	Joel Harrison 7	
SSC1301	Above All	Jonny King	
SSC1302	Santiarican Blues Suite	Aruán Ortiz	
SSC1303	Perrier Street	Davy Mooney	
SSC1304	The Eleventh Hour	Johnathan Blake	
SSC1305	Grown Folks Music	Ben Riley Quartet	Featuring Wayne Escoffery
SSC1306	That Nepenthetic Place	Dayna Stephens	
SSC1309	Landscape Scripture	Scott DuBois	
SSC1310	Jahira	Hans Glawischnig	
SSC1311	Brooklyn Bazaar	Scott Tixier	
SSC1312	Figurations	Miles Okazaki	
SSC1313	Home - Gift of Music: Japan Earthquake and Tsunami Relief	Various Artists	
SSC1314	Tongos	Diego Schissii	
SSC1315	Duos III	Luciana Souza	
SSC1316	Book of Chet	Luciana Souza	
SSC1317	The Talk of the Town	Sal Mosca	
SSC1318	Pierrot et Colombine	Carlos Franzetti	
SSC1319	Drum Music	Russ Lossing	
SSC1320	The Only Son of One	Wayne Escoffery	
SSC1321	Unison	Maria Neckam	
SSC1322	Wherever You Are	Denny Zeitlin	
SSC1323	Life's Magic	Steve Kuhn	
SSC1325	The Elvin Jones Project	Michael Feinberg	
SSC1326	Mzansi	Adam Glasser	
SSC1330	Twain	Rebecca Martin	
SSC1331	La Peur du Vide	Bill McHenry	
SSC1332	North Hero	Chris Morrissey	
SSC1333	Painter's Eye	Sunny Kim	
SSC1334	Migrations	Cristina Pato	
SSC1335	My Life Is Bold: Arts for Life	Various Artists	
SSC1336	I've Been Ringing You	Dave King	
SSC1337	Live at the Village Vanguard	Guillermo Klein Quintet	Featuring Lilliana Herrero
SSC1338	Magic Beans	Benny Green	
SSC1340	Nameless Neighbors	Nick Sanders Trio	
SSC1341	Christmastime in New York	Jamie Leonhart	
SSC1342	Music for September	Vadim Neselovskyi	
SSC1343	Live in New York at Jazz Standard	Edward Simon Trio	
SSC1344	Journey to Journey	Miho Hazama	
SSC1345	Mistery	Lucian Ban	
SSC1346	Tales	Diego Barber with Craig Taborn	
SSC1347	A Thousand Julys	Kristin Slipp	
SSC1348	Bach: Complete Lute Works	Ricardo Gallén	
SSC1349	What Is This Thing Called?	Jean-Michel Pilc	
SSC1350	The Vanguard Date	Steve Kuhn	
SSC1351	Revealing Essence	Brandon Ross and Stomu Takeishi	
SSC1352	Both / And	Denny Zeitlin	
SSC1353	Spirit of the Garden	Rose & the Nightingale	
SSC1355	Spellbound	Trilok Gurtu	Reissue of 2013 Moosicus album
SSC1356	Mukashi	Abdullah Ibrahim	
SSC1357	Hydra	Ben Monder	
SSC1358	Hush Point	John McNeil	
SSC1359	El Bardo	Aldo Del Rio	
SSC1360	Harry Who?: A Tribute to Harry Warren	Jay Clayton	
SSC1362	Kitano Noir	Sara Serpa and Ran Blake	
SSC1363	In This Life	Jamie Baum Septet +	
SSC1364	Thwirl	Stephan Crump's Rosetta Trio	
SSC1365	Big Stuff	Venissa Santi Afro Cuban Holiday	
SSC1366	Infinite Possibility	Joel Harrison 19	
SSC1367	March Sublime	Alan Ferber	
SSC1368	Live	Joey Calderazzo Trio	
SSC1369	Trombone for Lovers	Roswell Rudd	
SSC1370	Tootie's Tempo	Ethan Iverson and Albert Heath	
SSC1371	Adopted Highway	Dave King Trucking Company	
SSC1372	Show of Hands	Jim Beard	
SSC1373	Duende	Avishai Cohen with Nitai Hershkovits	
SSC1374	Genevieve & Ferdinand	Kate McGarry and Keith Ganz	
SSC1375	Nine Stories	Clovis Nicolas	
SSC1376	Sotareño	Carolina Calvache	
SSC1377	Sky/Lift	Randy Ingram	
SSC1378	Amalgamations	Ali Jackson	
SSC1379	Live at Firehouse 12	Wayne Escoffery	
SSC1380	Stairway to the Stars	Denny Zeitlin	
SSC1381	Só Brazilian Essence	Romero Lubambo	
SSC1383	Tangos	Rubén Blades	
SSC1384	In the Key of Tango	Carlos Franzetti	
SSC1385	The Turn	Jerome Sabbagh	
SSC1386	Sound, Space and Structures	John Escreet	
SSC1387	Songs from Afar	Lucian Ban	
SSC1388	Belleville Project	Jeremy Udden	
SSC1389	You are a Creature	Nick Sanders	
SSC1390	Things of That Particular Nature	Duane Eubanks	
SSC1391	Lush Life: A Musical Journey	Joe Castro	6CD Box Set
SSC1394	Connections: Mind the Gap	Bob Stewart	
SSC1395	Post No Bills	Greg Reitan	
SSC1396	Tiddy Boom	Michael Blake	
SSC1397	Blues & Reds	Hush Point	
SSC1398	Portraits	Guilhem Flouzat	
SSC1399	Peace	Dayna Stephens	
SSC1400	Infinite Winds	Guillermo Klein, Chick Corea and Don Byron	With MIT Wind Ensemble & MIT Festival Jazz Ensemble
SSC1401	Live in Santa Cruz!	Benny Green	
SSC1402	The Now	Aaron Goldberg	
SSC1403	Philadelphia Beat	Albert Heath	
SSC1404	The Song Is My Story	Abdullah Ibrahim	
SSC1405	The Origin of Adjustable Things	Joanna Wallfisch with Dan Tepfer	
SSC1406	My Ideal	Glenn Zaleski	
SSC1407	Mingus Sings	Frank Lacy	
SSC1408	Riding the Moment	Denny Zeitlin and George Marsh	
SSC1409	Going Home	Joey Calderazzo	
SSC1410	Speaking in Tongues	Luciana Souza	
SSC1411	Up Go We	Logan Strosahl Team	
SSC1413	Rambling Confessions	John Hébert	
SSC1414	Los Guachos V	Guillermo Klein	
SSC1415	Latina	Cristina Pato	
SSC1416	Upstate	Rebecca Martin and Guillermo Klein	
SSC1417	Wanted	Grégoire Maret	
SSC1418	Venezuelan Suite	Edward Simon	
SSC1419	New Day	Kevin Hays	
SSC1420	Time River	Miho Hazama	
SSC1427	Setembro: A Brazilian Under the Jazz Influence	Romero Lubambo	
SSC1428	Vinicius Canta Antonio Carlos Jobim	Vinicius Cantuária	
SSC1429	Proximity	Bill McHenry and Andrew Cyrille	
SSC1430	Perfectest Herald	9 Horses	
SSC1431	Recurring Dream	Mike McGinnis	
SSC1432	Sarabande	Fred Hersch with Charlie Haden and Joey Baron	2016 Reissue of SSC1024
SSC1433	Pa El Agus y El Uli	Juan Pablo Navarro	
SSC1434	Musings	Christopher Zuar Orchestra	
SSC1435	Jersey Cat	Freddie Hendrix	
SSC1436	At This Time...	Steve Kuhn Trio	
SSC1437	The Digging	Dan Blake	
SSC1438	En Vie	Camille Bertault	
SSC1439	Traces	Camila Meza	
SSC1440	Seemed Like a Good Idea: Petra Haden Sings Jesse Harris	Petra Haden and Jesse Harris	
SSC1441	Presented By The Side Door Jazz Club	Black Art Jazz Collective	
SSC1442	Eleven Cages	Dan Tepfer Trio	
SSC1443	Unraveling Emily	Jay Clayton and Kirk Nurock	
SSC1444	The Opposite of Time	Brian Cullman	
SSC1446	Cosmic Adventure	Scott Tixier	
SSC1448	Live at Maxwell's	Duane Eubanks' DE3	
SSC1449	Surrounded by the Night	Dave King Trucking Company	
SSC1450	Stranger Days	Adam O'Farrill	
SSC1451	Just a Silly Game	Kay Lyra	
SSC1452	Roots & Transitions	Alan Ferber Nonet	
SSC1453	Saturday Songs	Chris Cheek	
SSC1454	Argentum	Carlos Franzetti	
SSC1455	Gardens In My Mind	Joanna Wallfisch	
SSC1456	Early Wayne	Denny Zeitlin	
SSC1457	Hush Point III	Hush Point	
SSC1458	Disappearing Day	Peter Eldridge	
SSC1459	Araminta	Harriet Tubman	
SSC1460	And to the Republic	ELEW	
SSC1462	Vitor Gonçalves Quartet	Vitor Gonçalves Quartet	
SSC1463	Hope of Home	Davy Mooney	
SSC1464	North	Kevin Hays New Day Trio	
SSC1465	Bastille Day: Le Bal du 14 Juillet	Various Artists	
SSC1466	Sampa	Romero Lubambo Trio	
SSC1467	Shorter by Two	Kirk Lightsey and Harold Dank	2017 Reissue of SSC1004
SSC1468	Beautiful Love (Remastered)	Fred Hersch	
SSC1469	Janus	Nick Sanders and Logan Strosahl	
SSC1470	The Wandering	Randy Ingram	Featuring Drew Gress
SSC1471	Listening to You	Judy Niemack with Dan Tepfer	
SSC1472	Over the Rainbow	Chano Domínguez	
SSC1473	The Unknown	John Escreet	
SSC1475	Manhattan in the Rain	Norma Winstone	Reissue of 1998 Enodoc album
SSC1476	Like Song, Like Weather	Norma Winstone and John Taylor	Reissue of 1999 Koch Jazz album
SSC1477	Well Kept Secret	Norma Winstone	Reissue of 1995 Hot House album
SSC1478	Fellowship	Glenn Zaleski	
SSC1479	Steppin' Out	Steps Ahead	
SSC1480	Music for Chameleons	Jesse Harris	
SSC1481	One Minute Later	Diego Barber	
SSC1482	The Seasons of Being	Andy Milne & Dapp Theory	
SSC1483	Luminosa	Carlos Franzetti and Allison Brewster Franzetti	
SSC1484	Town and Country	Dominique Eade and Ran Blake	
SSC1485	Happiness! Live at Kuumbwa	Benny Green	
SSC1486	Beckon	Adam Kolker	
SSC1487	Expedition	Denny Zeitlin and George Marsh	
SSC1488	For Those About to Jazz/Rock We Salute You	Vector Families	
SSC1489	Masters In Bordeaux	Martial Solal and Dave Liebman	
SSC1490	To and from the Heart	Steve Kuhn Trio	with Steve Swallow and Joey Baron
SSC1492	A Thing Called Joe	Guilhem Flouzat	
SSC1493	Book I of Arthur	Logan Strosahl Team	
SSC1494	Jigsaw	Alan Ferber Bigband	
SSC1495	Freedom Suite Ensuite	Clovis Nicolas	Featuring Kenny Washington
SSC1496	Homecoming	Vince Mendoza and WDR Big Band Cologne	
SSC1499	Vortex	Wayne Escoffery	
SSC1500	The Lead Belly Project	Adam Nussbaum	
SSC1501	Joy Ride	John Raymond & Real Feel	
SSC1502	Bridges	Jamie Baum Septet +	
SSC1504	Quarteria	Román Filiú	
SSC1505	Singular Awakening	Mike McGinnis	
SSC1506	Heart Tonic	Caroline Davis	
SSC1507	Duduka Da Fonseca Trio Plays Dom Salvador	Duduka Da Fonseca Trio	
SSC1508	Chano & Colina	Chano Domínguez and Javier Colina	
SSC1509	Faroe	Mikkel Ploug and Mark Turner	
SSC1510	Beautiful Liar	Shamie Royston	
SSC1511	Sorrows and Triumphs	Edward Simon	
SSC1512	Freebird	Walking Distance featuring Jason Moran	
SSC1513	Good Question	Matt Penman	
SSC1514	Wishing On the Moon	Denny Zeitlin	
SSC1515	New York Stories	Judy Niemack	With Jim McNeely and the Danish Radio Big Band
SSC1517	Benign Strangers	Davy Mooney and Ko Omura	
SSC1518	The Book of Longing	Luciana Souza	
SSC1519	The Painted Lady Suite	Michael Leonhart Orchestra	
SSC1520	Woven Threads	Stu Mindeman	
SSC1521	At the Edge of the World	Aaron Goldberg	
SSC1522	No Filter	Jerome Sabbagh and Greg Tuohey	
SSC1523	Quartette Oblique	Quartette Oblique	
SSC1524	Science Fair	Allison Miller and Carmen Staaf	
SSC1525	The Monk: Live at Bimhuis	Miho|Hazama|nolink=1 and Metropole Orkest Big Band	
SSC1526	Free Fall	Lucian Ban and Alex Simu	
SSC1528	Then and Now	Benny Green	
SSC1529	City Animals	Yuhan Su	
SSC1530	Bonegasm	Jennifer Wharton	
SSC1531	Swirl	Michael Wolff	
SSC1532	Motian Music	Russ Lossing	
SSC1533	Ricordare	Carlos Franzetti	
SSC1535	Real Feels Live Vol.2	John Raymond	
SSC1536	The Terror End of Beauty	Harriet Tubman	
SSC1537	Playtime 2050	Nick Sanders Trio	
SSC1538	Anthems	Caroline Davis	
SSC1540	Étoilée	Joe Martin	
SSC1541	Berlin People	Tobias Meinhart	
SSC1542	West 60th	Greg Reitan	
SSC1543	Sure	Logan Strosahl Spec Ops	
SSC1544	Dark Blue	Alex Harding and Lucian Ban	
SSC1545	Three in Paris	Jeremy Udden	
SSC1546	Dancer in Nowhere	Miho Hazama	
SSC1547	Sanctuary	Matt Slocum	
SSC1548	Percussion Theory	Alejandro Coello	
SSC1549	Day After Day	Ben Monder	
SSC1550	Colour	Anat Fort	
SSC1552	Swiss Jazz Orchestra & Guillermo Klein	Swiss Jazz Orchestra and Guillermo Klein	
SSC1553	Remembering Miles	Denny Zeitlin	
SSC1554	Nature Work	Nature Work	
SSC1555	Suite Extracts Vol. 1	Michael Leonhart Orchestra	
SSC1556	Joy	Jay Leonhart	
SSC1557	Brazilian Duos	Luciana Souza	2019 Reissue of SSC1100
SSC1558	Duos II	Luciana Souza	2019 Reissue of SSC1142
SSC1559	Natural Machines	Dan Tepfer	
SSC1560	Hermeto: Voice and Wind	Erik Charlston Jazz Brazil	
SSC1563	Samba Jazz & Tom Jobim	Duduka Da Fonseca	
SSC1564	Paramus	Chano Domínguez and Hadar Noiberg	
SSC1565	Live At Firehouse 12	Gerald Cleaver & Violet Hour	
SSC1566	Dust	Mat Maneri Quartet	
SSC1567	Los Guachos Cristal	Guillermo Klein	
SSC1568	Four Visions	Dave Liebman, Dave Binney, Donny McCaslin and Samuel Blais	
SSC1569	The Means of Response	Randy Ingram	
SSC1571	Pequeña Canción	Tobias Meinhart	
SSC1572	Old Songs New	Lee Konitz Nonet	
SSC1573	Utica Box	Dan Weiss Trio Plus One	
SSC1584	Blood from a Stone	9 Horses	

=== 3000 Series ===
Catalog No.	Album	Artist	Details
SSC3001	Days of Wine and Roses	Michel Petrucciani	2CD compilation of 1981-85 Owl recordings
SSC3002	Live at Bradley's	Kenny Barron	Reissue of 2001 EmArcy album
SSC3003	Toyebi Té	Lokua Kanza	
SSC3004	Milagro	Natalia M. King	
SSC3005	Canta Brasil	Kenny Barron	
SSC3006	Youth Oriented	Happy Apple	
SSC3007	Inspiration: 22 Great Harmonica Performances	Various Artists	
SSC3008	Malicool	Roswell Rudd and Toumani Diabaté	
SSC3009	Café de Flore	Various Artists	
SSC3010	Azul	Helena	
SSC3011	Memphis	Jean-Jacques Milteau	
SSC3012	The Beat Suite	Steve Lacy	
SSC3013	Jaleo	Louis Winsberg	
SSC3014	Interior	Márcio Faraco	
SSC3015	Spirit! The Power of Music	Randy Weston	
SSC3016	O Universo Musical de Baden Powel	Baden Powell	2CD compilation of 1960s Barclay and 1970s Festival recordings
SSC3017	The Hammond Organ of Christmas	Rhoda Scott	
SSC3018	Entre Chien et Loup	Daniel Mille	
SSC3019	Front Page	Dennis Chambers, Biréli Lagrène and Dominique Di Piazza	
SSC3020	Lilac Wine	Helen Merrill	
SSC3021	Images	Kenny Barron	
SSC3022	Lift: Live at the Village Vanguard	Chris Potter	
SSC3023	Paris Fétiche: The French Classic Rendez-Vous	Various Artists	
SSC3024	Something in Common	Denis Colin	
SSC3025	Paris Mississippi Blues	Memphis Slim	Compilation of 1962-1975 Barclay recordings
SSC3026	The Peace Between Our Companies	Happy Apple	
SSC3027	Encore, Encore, Encore	Rhoda Scott	
SSC3028	Overtime	Dave Holland	
SSC3029	I Am Three	Mingus Big Band, Orchestra & Dynasty	
SSC3030	Toto Bona Lokua	Gerald Toto, Richard Bona and Lokua Kanza	
SSC3031	Live at Bradley's II	Kenny Barron	
SSC3032	Nee Dans la Nature	Helena	
SSC3033	Set Luna	Julia Sarr and Patrice Larose	
SSC3034	Underground	Chris Potter	
SSC3035	Barclay Sessions	Leny Eversong	Reissue of 1958 Barclay recordings
SSC3036	Via Brasil	Tania Maria	Reissue of 1974 Barclay recordings
SSC3037	Le Roi de la Bossa Nova	Luiz Bonfá	Reissue of 1962-63 Fontana recordings
SSC3038	Canta Vinicius de Moraes e Paolo Cesar Pinheiro	Baden Powell	Reissue of 1977 Festival recordings
SSC3039	Sou Ni Tile	Amadou et Mariam	
SSC3040	Encounter	Misja Fitzgerald-Michel	
SSC3041	Music Written for Monterey 1965	Charles Mingus	
SSC3042	Live in Tokyo at the Blue Note	Mingus Big Band	
SSC3043	World Musette	Les Primitifs du Futur	
SSC3044	Good Feelin'	T-Bone Walker	Reissue of 1969 Polydor album
SSC3045	The Blue Memphis Suite	Memphis Slim	Reissue of 1970 Barclay LP with additional tracks
SSC3046	Down South in the Bayou Country	Clarence "Gatemouth" Brown	Reissue of 1974 Barclay album
SSC3047	Memphis Heat	Memphis Slim, Canned Heat and The Memphis Horns	Reissue of 1974 Blue Star album
SSC3048	Frenchin' the Boogie	Clifton Chenier	Reissue of 1976 Blue Star album
SSC3049	Rock 'n' Roll Gumbo	Professor Longhair	Reissue of 1974 Blue Star album
SSC3050	Fourth and Beale	Furry Lewis	Reissue of 1971 Barclay album
SSC3051	Mississippi Delta Blues	McHouston Baker	Reissue of 1974 Blue Star album
SSC3052	Gates's on the Heat	Clarence "Gatemouth" Brown	Reissue of 1975 Blue Star album
SSC3053	Southside Reunion	Memphis Slim and Buddy Guy	Reissue of 1971 Barclay album
SSC3054	Via Brasil Volume 2	Tania Maria	Reissue of 1975 Barclay recordings
SSC3056	Le Monde Musical de Baden Powell	Baden Powell	Reissue of 1964 Barclay album
SSC3057	Samba Nouvelle Vague	Sivuca	Reissue of 1962 Barclay album
SSC3058	Critical Mass	Dave Holland	
SSC3060	Bogalusa Boogie Man	Clarence "Gatemouth" Brown	Reissue of 1975 Barclay album
SSC3063	One Long String	Red Mitchell	Reissue of 1969 Barclay album
SSC3064	Birdwatcher	Michel Portal	
SSC3065	Charles Mingus in Paris: The Complete America Session	Charles Mingus	Compilation of two 1970 America albums with additional material
SSC3066	BANG!: Dillinger Girl & Baby Face Nelson	Helena	
SSC3068	They Call Us Wild	The Wild Magnolias	Reissue of 1975 Barclay album
SSC3070	Double-Barreled Boogie	Memphis Slim and Roosevelt Sykes	Reissue of 1974 Olympic album
SSC3071	Boogie Woogie	Memphis Slim	Compilation of 1971 Festival recordings
SSC3073	Clameurs	Jacques Coursil	
SSC3074	Song for Anyone	Chris Potter 10	
SSC3075	Follow the Red Line	Chris Potter	
SSC3076	The Way of Beauty	Remember Shakti	DVD
SSC3077	Fraise Vanille	Helena	
SSC3078	Tribal Musette	Dominic Cravic and Les Primitifs du Futur	
SSC3079	The Traveler	Kenny Barron	
SSC3080	Latchès	Latchès	
SSC3081	La Vie En Rose 1935-1951	Edith Piaf	Compilation
SSC3082	A Paris 1948-49	Yves Montand	Compilation
SSC3083	Swing Troubadour 1937-47	Charles Trenet	Compilation
SSC3084	People Time: The Complete Recordings	Stan Getz and Kenny Barron	7CD Box Set
SSC3085	Trails of Tears	Jacques Coursil	
SSC3086	Sous le Ciel de Paris	Edith Piaf	Compilation
SSC3088	The Same As It Never Was Before	Stéphane Belmondo	
SSC3089	Christian Escoudé plays Brassens	Christian Escoudé	
SSC3090	Je Sais Nager	Irène Jacob	
SSC3091	Concert Au New Morning	Les Primitifs du Futur	
SSC3092	Gouache	Jacky Terrasson	
SSC3093	Kenny Barron & the Brazilian Knights	Kenny Barron	
SSC3097	The Roots of the Blues	Randy Weston and Billy Harper	
SSC3098	Gréco Chante Brel	Juliette Gréco	
SSC3099	Shadow Theater	Tigran Hamasyan	
SSC3100	The Poet	Tigran Hamasyan	

=== 3500 Series: OWL Records ===
Catalog No.	Album	Artist	Details
SSC3501	Toot Sweet	Lee Konitz and Michel Petrucciani	
SSC3502	After Hours	Jeanne Lee and Mal Waldron	
SSC3503	Partners	Paul Bley and Gary Peacock	
SSC3504	Fly Away Little Bird	Jimmy Giuffre, Paul Bley and Steve Swallow	
SSC3505	Paris Blues	Gil Evans and Steve Lacy	
SSC3506	No Tears...No Goodbyes	Helen Merrill and Gordon Beck	
SSC3507	Ten Tales	Aldo Romano and Joe Lovano	
SSC3508	Oceans in the Sky	Steve Kuhn, Miroslav Vitouš and Aldo Romano	
SSC3509	Natural Affinities	Jeanne Lee	
SSC3510	Michel Petrucciani	Michel Petrucciani	
SSC3511	Unleemited	Lee Konitz and Kenny Werner	
SSC3512	Music Makers	Helen Merrill, Gordon Beck, Stéphane Grappelli and Steve Lacy	
SSC3513	Happy Reunion	Stéphane Grappelli and Martial Solal	
SSC3514	The Life of a Trio: Saturday	Paul Bley, Jimmy Guiffre and Steve Swallow	
SSC3515	The Life of a Trio: Sunday	Paul Bley, Jimmy Guiffre and Steve Swallow	
SSC3516	Wende	Ran Blake	
SSC3517	Longing	Bob Mintzer and Gil Goldstein	
SSC3519	Oracle's Destiny	Michel Petrucciani	
SSC3520	Cold Blues	Michel Petrucciani and Ron McClure	
SSC3525	Listen to the Night	Linda Sharrock and Eric Watson	
SSC3526	Two by 2	Steve Kuhn and Steve Swallow	

=== 3600 Series: Sunnyside Café ===
Catalog No.	Album	Artist	Details
SSC3601	Aux Armes et Cætera	Serge Gainsbourg	2CD reissue of 1969 Philips recordings with additional unreleased material
SSC3602	Mauvaises Nouvelles des Etoiles	Serge Gainsbourg	2CD reissue of 1972 Philips recordings with additional unreleased material
SSC3603	Paris City Coffee	Various Artists	
SSC3604	Pop à Paris: Rock n' Roll and Mini Skirts Compilation 1	Various Artists	
SSC3605	Café Mundo	Various Artists	
SSC3606	Pop à Paris: Rock n' Roll and Mini Skirts Compilation 2	Various Artists	
SSC3607	Love and the Beat 1	Serge Gainsbourg	2CD compilation of soundtracks by Gainsbourg
SSC3608	Love and the Beat 2	Serge Gainsbourg	Compilation of remixed 1960-70s recordings
SSC3609	Jambalaya	Eddy Mitchell	
SSC3610	Le Temps d'une Chanson	Juliette Gréco	

=== 4000 Series ===
Catalog No.	Album	Artist	Details
SSC4001	Balance	Marc Mommaas and Nikolaj Hess	
SSC4002	All or Nothing at All	Armen Donelian and Marc Mommaas	
SSC4003	Natural Instinct	Laszlo Gardony	
SSC4007	Oasis	Armen Donelian Trio	
SSC4008	Dig Deep	Laszlo Gardony	
SSC4009	Oscar e Familia	Oscar Feldman	
SSC4010	Leapfrog	Armen Donelian	
SSC4011	Signature Time	Laszlo Gardony	
SSC4012	Evoke	Stan Killian	
SSC4013	Small Constructions	Dan Tepfer and Ben Wendel	
SSC4014	Clarity	Laszlo Gardony	
SSC4015	A Lorca Soundscape	Alexis Cuadrado	
SSC4018	Sayat-Nova: Songs of My Ancestors	Armen Donelian	
SSC4019	Life in Real Time	Laszlo Gardony	
SSC4023	Fields of Pannonia	Christian Artmann	
SSC4024	Ballads & Standards	Marc Mommaas	
SSC4025	Collectables	Todd Coolman	
SSC4027	Poètica	Alexis Cuadrado	
SSC4028	All the Dreams	Sara Serpa and André Matos	
SSC4029	Serious Play	Laszlo Gardony	
SSC4030	Our Story	Christian Artmann	
SSC4031	Brazilian Dream	Fleurine	
SSC4032	Monk's Dreams: The Complete Compositions of Thelonious Sphere Monk	Frank Kimbrough	
SSC4034	La Marseillaise	Laszlo Gardony	

=== 4100 Series ===
Catalog No.	Album	Artist	Details
SSC4101	Soul, Peace & Love	Liz McComb	
SSC4102	The Spirit Of New Orleans	Liz McComb	
SSC4103	Echo	Alyssa Graham	
SSC4104	Stones World	Tim Ries	
SSC4105	Cuentos del Mundo	Chano Domínguez and Marina Albero	Narrated by Constantino Romero
SSC4106	Krazy Love	Luba Mason	
SSC4107	Distancia	Magos Herrera	
WAL4109	The Lock, Stock & Soul EP	Alyssa Graham	Digital only release
WAL4110	Lock, Stock & Soul	Alyssa Graham	
SSC4112	Mates	Diego Urcola	

=== 4500 Series ===
Catalog No.	Album	Artist	Details
SSC4501	Under the Hat	Ada Rovatti	
SSC4502	Center Songs	Tom Beckham	
SSC4503	Lighter Way	David Kikoski	
SSC4510	Voyager: Live by Night	Eric Harland	
SSC4551	Funk Tango	Paquito D'Rivera	
PAQR4552	Pianist	Alex Brown	
PAQR4553	Tango Jazz: Live at Jazz at Lincoln Center	Paquito D'Rivera	
SSC4554	Song for Maura	Paquito D'Rivera	
SSC4555	Jazz Meets the Classics	Paquito D'Rivera	
SSC4556	Aires Tropicales	Paquito D'Rivera & Quinteto Cimarrón	
SSC4557	Paquito D'Rivera Plays the Music of Armando Manzanero	Paquito D'Rivera and Armando Manzanero	
SSC4558	Kites Over Havana	The Vitral Saxophone Quartet	
SSC4559	Bright Eyes	Victor Provost	

=== 4600 Series ===
Catalog No.	Album	Artist	Details
SSC4601	Lyla	Avishai Cohen	
SSC4602	At Home	Avishai Cohen Trio and Ensemble	
SSC4603	Continuo	Avishai Cohen	
SSC4604	Locked in a Basement	Heernt	
SSC4605	I Forgot What You Taught Me	Sam Barsh	
SSC4606	Evolution	Amos Hoffman	
SSC4607	Gently Disturbed	Avishai Cohen Trio	
SSC4608	Mission Statement	Jimmy Greene	
SSC4609	Carving	Amos Hoffman	
SSC4610	Lady of the Forest	Karen Malka	
SSC4613	Wild	Ilan Salem	
SSC4616	From Darkness	Avishai Cohen Trio	
SSC4617	One World	Shachar Elnatan	
SSC4618	Caipi	Kurt Rosenwinkel	
SSC4619	Arvoles	Avishai Cohen	

=== 4700 Series ===
Catalog No.	Album	Artist	Details
SSC4701	Sketch	David Schnitter	
SSC4702	The Champs	Ximo Tebar with Joey DeFrancesco and Idris Muhammad	
SSC4703	Ximo Tebar Goes Blue	Ximo Tebar with Dr. Lonnie Smith and Idris Muhammad	Featuring Lou Donaldson
SSC4704	Eclipse	Ximo Tebar & Fourlights	
SSC4705	Steps	Ximo Tebar & Ivam Jazz Ensemble	
SSC4706	A Jazzy World Christmas	Ximo Tebar	
GH4751	Royalty at Le Duc	Gary Smulyan Quartet	
SSC4752	The 4 American Jazz Men In Tangier	Idrees Sulieman Quartet	Featuring Oscar Dennard
SSC4753	Art of the Piano Duo: Live	Kenny Barron and Mulgrew Miller	
