= Magos Herrera (album) =

Compilation album by Magos Herrera
- Released: April 21, 2004
- Recorded: 2000–2003
- Genre: Latin jazz, Latin pop
- Label: Mecca Records

Magos Herrera chronology
Pais Maravilla (2003)	Magos Herrera (2004)	Todo Puede Inspirar (2005)

Singles from Magos Herrera
- 1. "Como Un Poeta" Released: February 2000; 2. "Orquideas Susurrantes" Released: February 2000; 3. "Agua" Released: August 2003; 4. "Somos" Released: August 2003

Magos Herrera is a Japanese compilation album, by the Latin jazz Mexican singer, Magos Herrera. Released on April 21, 2004 in Japan, the album included songs from her previous albums, Orquideas Susurrantes and Pais Maravilla.

== Background and theme ==
The album was her only release in Japan and distributed by Mecca Records, and can only be found on Amazon.com.

== Track listing ==
1. "Como Un Poeta" (As A Poet)^{1}
2. "Somos" (We Are)^{2}
3. "Pais Maravilla" (Wonderland)^{2}
4. "La Espera" (The Longing)^{2}
5. "Dennis"^{1}
6. "Xote De Manha" (Xote Of Morning)^{1}
7. "Maria de Verdad" (Mary Of True)^{1}
8. "Son Del Negrito" (Negrito "Son")^{1}
9. "Son Cotidiano" (Daily "Son")^{2}
10. "Princesa Caballero" (Princess/Knight)^{2}
11. "Luna Menguante" (Decreasing Moon)^{2}
12. "Drumme Negrita" (Cuban Lullaby)^{2}
13. "Agua" (Water)^{2}
14. "Orquideas Susurrantes" (Whispering Orchids)^{1}
15. "Serafín" (Serafin)^{2}
16. "Sauce Llorón" (Weeping willows)^{1}
17. "Necesito Un Sol" (Need A Sun)^{2}
18. "A Pureza do Mundo caín" (The World's Purity Is Falling Down)^{1}

^{1} taken from the album Orquideas Susurrantes
^{2} taken from the album Pais Maravilla
