= Louis Vuitton Foundation =

Art museum and cultural centre in Paris

- Established: 20 October 2014; 11 years ago
- Location: 8 Avenue du Mahatma-Gandhi; 16th arrondissement of Paris, France
- Coordinates: 48°52′36″N 2°15′48″E
- Visitors: 1,570,000 (2025)
- Architect: Frank Gehry
- Owner: LVMH
- Website: fondationlouisvuitton.fr

The Louis Vuitton Foundation (French: Fondation d'entreprise Louis-Vuitton), previously Louis Vuitton Foundation for Creation (Fondation Louis-Vuitton pour la création), is a French art museum and cultural center sponsored by the group LVMH and its subsidiaries. It is run as a legally separate, nonprofit entity as part of LVMH's promotion of art and culture.

The art museum opened on 20 October 2014, in the presence of President François Hollande. The Deconstructivist building was designed by Canadian-American architect Frank Gehry, with groundwork starting in 2006. It is adjacent to the Jardin d'Acclimatation in the Bois de Boulogne of the 16th arrondissement of Paris, bordering on Neuilly-sur-Seine. More than 1.4 million people visited the Louis Vuitton Foundation in 2017.

The cost of the museum, initially projected to be €100 million, was revealed in 2017 to have been nearly eight times that sum. A November 2018 report of the Court of Audit indicated that from 2007 to 2014, building construction constituted the main activity of the Foundation, and that the LVMH group received €518 million of tax breaks during that time.

== History ==
In 2001, Bernard Arnault, CEO of LVMH, met architect Frank Gehry. He told him of plans for a new building for the Louis Vuitton Foundation for Creation on the edge of the Bois de Boulogne. The building project was first presented in 2006, with costs estimated at €100 million ($127 million) and plans to open in late 2009 or early 2010. Suzanne Pagé, then director of the Musée d'Art Moderne de la Ville de Paris, was named the foundation's artistic director in charge of developing the museum's program.

The city of Paris which owns the park granted a building permit in 2007. In 2011, an association for the safeguard of the Bois de Boulogne won a court battle, as the judge ruled the centre had been built too close to a tiny asphalt road deemed a public right of way. Opponents to the site had also complained that a new building would disrupt the verdant peace of the historic park. The city appealed the court decision. Renowned French architect Jean Nouvel backed Gehry and said of the objectors: "With their little tight-fitting suits, they want to put Paris in formalin. It's quite pathetic." Eventually a special law was passed by the Assemblée Nationale that the Foundation was in the national interest and "a major work of art for the whole world", which allowed it to proceed.

The museum opened to the public in October 2014, at a reported cost of $143 million. However, in May 2017, Marianne, a French news magazine, revealed that the final cost of the building had been €780 million (close to $900 million). In November 2018, FRICC, a French anti-corruption group, filed a complaint in court in Paris accusing the Louis Vuitton Foundation of committing fraud and tax evasion in the construction of its museum. It claimed the nonprofit branch of the LVMH conglomerate was able to deduct about 60% of the cost of the museum from its taxes and request tax refunds on some other costs. In all, FRICC claimed LVMH and the Louis Vuitton Foundation received nearly €603 million from the government toward the nearly €790 million construction costs of the museum. In September 2019, the case was dismissed.

Before the official opening, it provided the venue for Louis Vuitton's women's spring/summer 2015 fashion show.

== Architecture ==
=== Design ===
Distorted LV logo on the facade of the Fondation Louis Vuitton in Paris.

Upon Arnault's invitation, Frank Gehry visited the garden, and imagined an architecture inspired by the glass Grand Palais, and also by the structures of glass, such as the Palmarium, which was built for the Jardin d'Acclimatation in 1893. The building site is designed after the founding principles of 19th century landscaped gardens. It connects the building with the Jardin d'Acclimatation at north, and the Bois de Boulogne to the south.

The two-story structure has 11 galleries of different sizes (in total 41,441 square feet), a voluminous 350-seat auditorium on the lower-ground floor and multilevel roof terraces for events and art installations. Gehry had to build within the square footage and two-story volume of a bowling alley that previously stood on the site; anything higher had to be glass. The resulting glass building takes the form of a sailboat's sails inflated by the wind. These glass sails envelop the "iceberg", a series of shapes with white, flowery terraces.

The galleries on the upper floors are lit by recessed or partially hidden skylights.

The side of the building facing Avenue Mahatma Gandhi, right above the ticket booth, holds a large stainless-steel LV logo designed by Gehry.

According to Gehry's office, more than 400 people contributed design plans, engineering rules, and construction constraints to a shared Web-hosted 3D digital model. The 3,600 glass panels and 19,000 concrete panels that form the façade were simulated and then molded by industrial robots working off the common model. STUDIOS architecture was the local architect for the project spearheading the transition from Gehry's schematic design through the construction process in Paris to building space. The consultants for the auditorium were Nagata Acoustics and AVEL Acoustics for the acoustics and Ducks Scéno as scenographer.

=== Construction ===
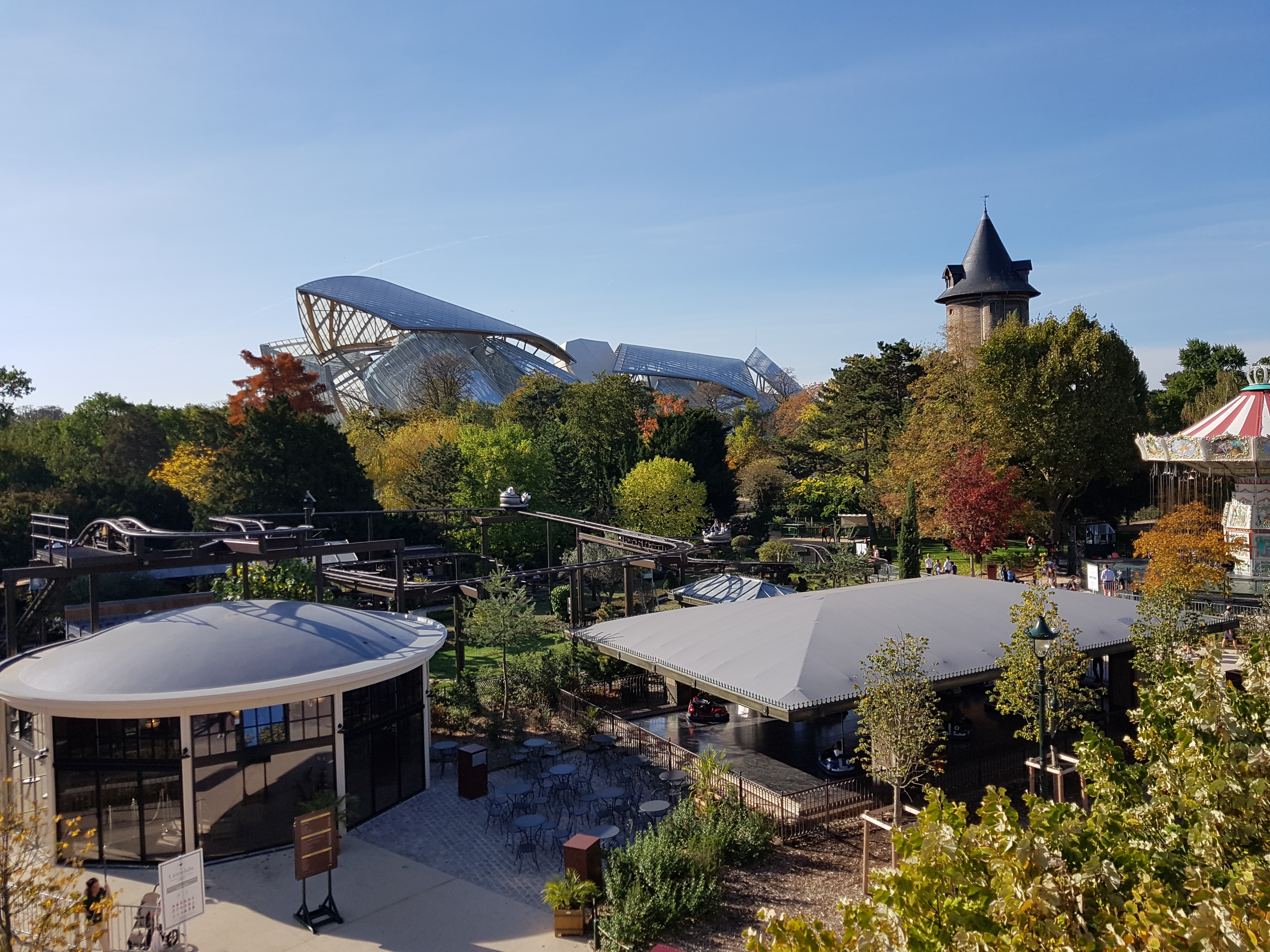
View of the building in the background from the Jardin d'Acclimatation

Construction began in March 2008. The realization of the 126,000-square-foot project required innovative technological developments, from the design phase with the use of 3D design software, Digital Project, specially adapted for the aviation industry. All teams in project management worked simultaneously on the same digital model so that professionals could exchange information in real time.

Opposing this building project, an organization that protects the park, Coordination for the Safeguarding of the Bois de Boulogne, appealed to the Administrative Justice and successfully challenged both the land authorization, issued by a decision of the Council of Paris, and the building permit, leading to the latter being canceled on January 20, 2011. To save the museum project, the city of Paris changed its planning regulations concerning land usage. In April 2011, concerning the building permit, the city and the Louis Vuitton Foundation received approval to continue the work. The association then appealed to the Constitutional Council by filing a priority issue of constitutionality (QPC) targeting the permit but on 24 February 2012 the challenge was rejected by the Constitutional Council.

Fondation Louis-Vuitton, across a water basin, December 4, 2025

In 2012, construction of the building reached a milestone with the installation of glass sails. These sails are made of 3,584 laminated glass panels, each unique and specifically curved to fit the shapes drawn by the architect. The gallery sections are covered in a white fiber-reinforced concrete called Ductal. The teams participating in the construction of the building have been awarded several architectural awards in France and the U.S.

== Collection ==
The museum's collection, believed to be a combination of works owned by LVMH and Bernard Arnault, include works by Jean-Michel Basquiat, Gilbert & George, and Jeff Koons. For site-specific installations, under the curatorship of Francesca Pietropaolo, the foundation commissioned works by Ellsworth Kelly, Olafur Eliasson, Janet Cardiff and George Bures Miller (starring Scott Tixier and Tony Tixier), Sarah Morris, Taryn Simon, Cerith Wyn Evans, and Adrián Villar Rojas.

Morris made the film "Strange Magic" (2014); Simon created the installation "A Polite Fiction" (2014). Kelly made a curtain, Spectrum VIII (2014), consisting of 12 coloured strips, for the building's auditorium. Eliasson created Inside the Horizon (2014), made up of 43 prism-shaped yellow columns that are illuminated from the inside and placed along a walkway. Villar Rojas created "Where the Slaves Live" (2014), a water tank containing found objects, discarded sneakers and plants, installed under one of the 12 glass "sails" that provide the Fondation's signature, swerving shape.

== Auditorium ==
The Auditorium can be used as a small concert hall. The inaugural recital was performed by Lang Lang on 24 October 2014. Other artists have included Yunchan Lim, Kanye West, Tedi Papavrami, Yuja Wang, Vladimir Spivakov, Steve Reich, Chick Corea, Gims and Matthias Pintscher.

== Management ==
=== Funding ===
The museum was funded by LVMH and bears the name (and logo) of its flagship brand, Louis Vuitton. The building will pass into the hands of the city's government after 55 years.

== See also ==
- List of works by Frank Gehry
