= Cosmic Adventure =

Studio album by Scott Tixier
- Released: 9 September 2016
- Recorded: 2016
- Studios: Avatar, New York City
- Genre: Jazz
- Length: 46:48
- Label: Sunnyside
- Producer: Donald Brown

Scott Tixier chronology
Brooklyn Bazaar (2012)	Cosmic Adventure (2016)

Professional ratings
Review scores
Source	Rating
All About Jazz	4/4 stars
Midwest Record	favorable
Jazz Quad	favorable
Tower Records	favorable
Black Grooves / AAAMC	favorable
Argonauta	favorable
JazzDaGama	favorable
The Chimes	favorable
The New York Times	favorable
Classicalite	favorable
The Village Voice	favorable
Down Beat	4.5/5 stars
Best Albums of 2016 (Down Beat)	4.5/5 stars

Cosmic Adventure is Scott Tixier's second album. It was recorded at Avatar Studios in New York, produced by Donald Brown, following his debut album Brooklyn Bazaar. The single "Dig It (feat. Pedrito Martinez) was available in August 2016 and the full album released on September 9, 2016 by Sunnyside Records.

On September 1, the album was featured by the Archives of African American Music and Culture (AAAMC) in the Black Grooves September issue.

Cosmic Adventure was selected one of the Best Albums of 2016 by DownBeat magazine.

== Track listing ==
1. "Maze Walker (feat. Pedrito Martinez)" – 4:11
2. "Dig It (feat. Pedrito Martinez)" – 6:14
3. "100,000 Hours" – 4:53
4. "Troublant Bolero" – 5:23
5. "Mr Tix" – 5:31
6. "Misty" – 4:21
7. "Nil's Landing" – 3:50
8. "King of Sorrow" – 6:12
9. "Beam Me to Mars (feat. Chris Potter)" – 5:58

== Personnel ==
- Scott Tixier – violin
- Yvonnick Prene – harmonica
- Glenn Zaleski – piano
- Luques Curtis – bass
- Justin Brown – drums
- Pedrito Martinez – congas
- Chris Potter – tenor saxophone

== Technical credits ==
- Dave Darlington - Mixing/Mastering
- François Zalacain - Executive Producer
- Donald Brown - Producer
- Franck Bohbot - Photography
- Zach Harter - Graphic Design
- Rachel Foley - Set Design
- Jean-Luc Ponty - Liner Notes
- Corelli Savarez - Executive Producer
- Schertler Group - Executive Producer

== Release history ==
Region	Date	Format(s)	Label	Catalogue
WW	9 September 2016	CD, Music download	Sunnyside Records	SSC1446
