= Nick Sanders (disambiguation) =

Nick Sanders may refer to:

- Nick Sanders (Nicholas Mark Sanders, born 1958), British bicyclist, motorcyclist and author
- Nick Sanders (swimmer) (Nicholas James Sanders, born 1971), New Zealand swimmer
- Nick Sanders (musician), American jazz pianist and composer

== See also ==
- Nicholas Sanders (c. 1530–1581), English Catholic priest and polemicist
