= Mexico Azul =

Studio album by Magos Herrera
- Released: Aug 27, 2010 (Mexico)
- Recorded: 2010
- Genre: Latin jazz, Latin pop
- Label: Sony Music
- Producer: Tim Ries, Magos Herrera

Magos Herrera chronology
| Distancia (2009) | Mexico Azul (2010) |

Singles from Mexico Azul
- 1. "Luz de Luna" Released: Aug, 2010

Mexico Azul (Blue Mexico), is the sixth studio album by the Latin jazz Mexican singer Magos Herrera. Released on Aug 27, 2010 and digital release on Sep 7. Tim Ries produced the album along with Magos Herrera.

== Background and theme ==
Recorded in New York City, produced by Tim Ries and Magos Herrera, Mexico Azul shares a contemporary view of issues such as "Noche criolla" and "Azul" by Agustín Lara, "Luz de Luna" by Álvaro Carrillo and "Dos Gardenias" Isolde Carrillo, among others, accompanied by a first class band with great musicians like the bassist John Patitucci, representing once again, the Mexican jazz in the world.

Magos Herrera pays homage with this album to one of the most remembered in Mexico in the 1930s and '40s, which took place in the Golden Age of Mexican cinema and on the television program La Hora Azul (The Blue Hour), with Agustín Lara.

The material also pays tribute to artists from Puerto Rico and Cuba, who developed their careers in Mexico.

"I'm very happy with this material because it shows that I am given to jazz, that I love to give continuity to my career here in Mexico. The word 'blue' has a connotation interesting because it is depth, which drew my attention. "

The singer also said that this album represents, within the bicentennial and centennial celebrations in Mexico.

"It's important to celebrate, and that is why this disc is attached to the celebrations that are very important to Mexicans", he said.

The album was released in Mexico on August 27, and will be released digitally on September 7 worldwide.

== Track listing ==
1. "Luz de Luna" (Moonlight)
2. "Noche Criolla" (Creole Night)
3. "Azul" (Blue)
4. "Angelitos Negros" (Black Little Angels)
5. "Seguire Mi Viaje" (Will Continue My Journey)
6. "Voz Antigua (A Mi Tierra)" (Ancient Voice - My Land)
7. "Lamento Jarocho" (Jarocho's Lament)
8. "Que Sea Para Mi" (It Is For Me)
9. "Tres Palabras" (Tree Words)
10. "Obsesión" (Obsession)
11. "Dos Gardenias" (Two Gardenias)
