= Above All (Jonny King album) =

Studio album by Jonny King
- Released: March 26, 2012
- Recorded: December 18 & 19, 2010
- Studios: Van Gelder Studio, Englewood Cliffs, NJ
- Genre: Jazz
- Length: 61:51
- Labels: Sunnyside; SSC1301
- Producers: Don Sickler, Jonny King

Jonny King chronology
| The Meltdown (1997) | Above All (2012) |

Above All is a studio album by pianist Jonny King which was recorded in 2010 and released on the Sunnyside label in 2012.

== Reception ==
Professional ratings
Review scores
| Source | Rating |
|---|---|
| Allmusic | 4.5/5 stars |

Allmusic reviewer Ken Dryden stated: "Above All features him with a veteran rhythm section consisting of bassist Ed Howard and drummer Victor Lewis, with whom he has worked extensively. In his liner notes, King credits his bandmates with contributing suggestions that fine-tuned approaches to his originals, which explains why everything comes together so well ... Recommended".

== Track listing ==
All compositions by Jonny King

1. "The Merry-Go-Round" – 4:42
2. "Above All" – 6:08
3. "The Wedding Song" – 7:29
4. "Lullaby for Cecelia" – 4:29
5. "Spindrift" – 4:40
6. "Neither Here Nor There" – 5:46
7. "Catharsis" – 7:29
8. "Like It Is" – 4:29
9. "The Shrinkster" – 5:26
10. "The Silver Lining" – 5:53
11. "Espionage" – 5:20

== Personnel ==
Performance

- Jonny King – piano
- Ed Howard – bass
- Victor Lewis – drums

Production

- Don Sickler, Jonny King – producer
- Rudy Van Gelder – engineer
