= Wishing on the Moon =

Studio album by Meredith D'Ambrosio
- Released: October 10, 2006
- Recorded: July 24, 2004
- Studio: Van Gelder Studio, Englewood Cliffs, New Jersey
- Genre: Vocal jazz
- Length: 52:31
- Label: Sunnyside
- Producer: Don Sickler

Meredith D'Ambrosio chronology
Love Is for the Birds (2002)	Wishing on the Moon (2006)	By Myself (2012)

Wishing on the Moon is an album by jazz vocalist Meredith D'Ambrosio that was recorded in 2004 and released by Sunnyside in 2006.

== Reception ==
Professional ratings
Review scores
Source	Rating
Allmusic	4.5/5 stars
The Penguin Guide to Jazz Recordings	4/4 stars

The Allmusic review states, "It is difficult not to use some of liner note author Doug Ramsey's many adjectives to describe this marvelous singer, who is able to tell a story effortlessly with her pure, unaffected vocals, backed by the excellent support...Whether her theme is love in bloom, love lost, loneliness, or sentiment, d'Ambrosio conveys it in her soft, swinging style. This is the perfect CD for a quiet evening with someone special". In JazzTimes, Harvey Siders wrote, "If any songwriter deserves the encomium "American original," it's Meredith d'Ambrosio. No slave to A-A-B-A or 32-measure tunes, she has always followed her own muse. Her inspiration: intimate jazz, in the story telling style of Mabel Mercer. Meredith has a small range, but tons of wit, whimsy and wisdom. There's no doubt she's a bona fide jazz singer".

== Track listing ==
All compositions by Meredith D'Ambrosio except where noted

1. "Have You Noticed?" – 4:53
2. "I'd Do It All Again" – 5:43
3. "Don't Follow Me" – 4:58
4. "In the Glow of the Moon" (Dena DeRose, Meredith D'Ambrosio) – 5:43
5. "Melodious Funk" – 5:21
6. "Stay with Me" – 6:09
7. "Try as I May" – 4:42
8. "Wishing on the Moon" – 5:15
9. "Miracle of Spring" – 4:29
10. "Angels without Their Wings" (Meredith D'Ambrosio, Bradford Langer) – 5:13

== Personnel ==
- Meredith D'Ambrosio – vocals
- Don Sickler – trumpet, flugelhorn
- Cecilia Coleman – piano
- Tim Givens – double bass
- Vince Cherico – drums
