= Magos Herrera =

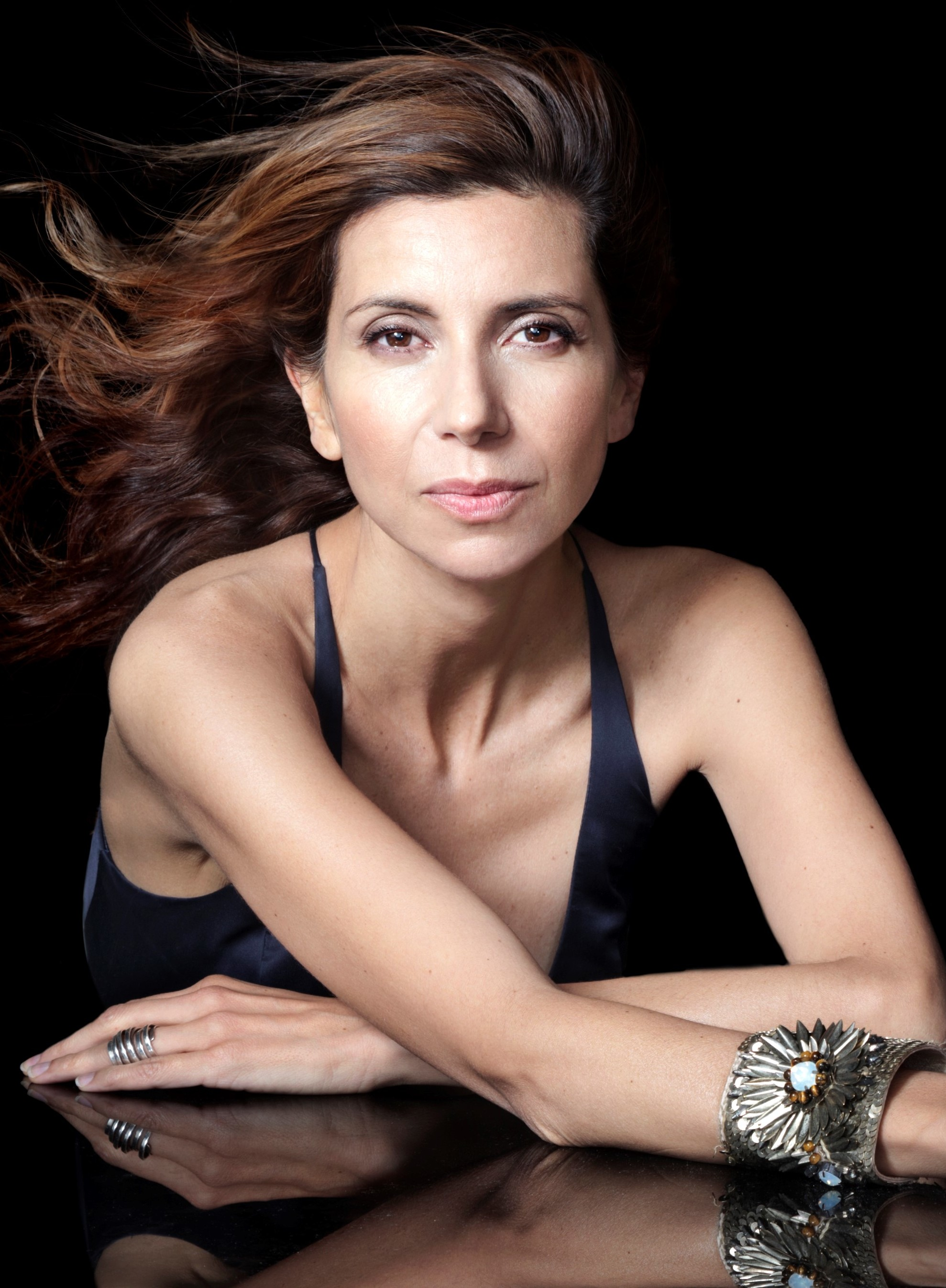
- Herrera in 2014

Background information
- Born: October 24, 1970 (age 55); Mexico City, Mexico
- Genres: Jazz, Latin, pop, rock
- Occupations: Singer, songwriter, producer, educator
- Years active: 1997–present
- Labels: Okeh, Sony, Sunnyside
- Website: www.magosherrera.com

Magos Herrera (born October 24, 1970) is a Mexican jazz singer, songwriter, producer, and educator. She sings in English, Spanish, and Portuguese, and has collaborated with Javier Limón, saxophonist Tim Ries, Aaron Goldberg, Pedro Aznar, Ed Simon Trio, John Patitucci, Luis Perdomo, Adam Rogers, Tim Hagans, Alex Kautz, composer Paola Prestini, former Kronos Quartet cellist Jeff Zeigler, and many others.

Herrera was nominated in 2006 and 2009 for Lunas del Auditorio Awards, presented by Mexico City's Auditorio Nacional for the best live performances, for Best Jazz Concert of the Year. Herrera was given the Berklee Latin Masters Award in 2015.

In 2011 she was selected along with Michelle Obama as one of the most important women of the year by Siempre Mujer magazine. Herrera is a United Nations' spokesperson for UN Women UNITE, a program promoting the elimination of violence against women, and the UN's "He For She" campaigns to promote gender equality.

She currently lives in Brooklyn, New York, with her husband, Brazilian jazz drummer Alexandre Kautz.

== Early life ==
Born in Mexico City in the 1970s, Herrera graduated from the Musicians Institute in Los Angeles in 1992. She later studied with Russian opera teacher Konstantin Jadan, then moved to Boston to continue instruction in contemporary improvisation.

== Music career ==
While in Mexico City, Magos released five albums: Orquídeas Susurrantes (2000), País Maravilla (2002), Todo Puede Inspirar (2004), and Soliluna (2006), the latter recorded with Mexican singer Iraida Noriega. She was also part of the compilation album series Mexican Divas (2001 and 2003).

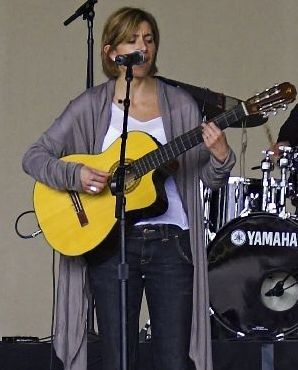
Herrera performing in 2007

In 2008, Herrera moved to New York. She performed locally including at the New York Winter Jazz Festival. Since then, she recorded and participated in multiple projects including the album Stones World: The Rolling Stones Project II (2008) for saxophonist Tim Ries, for contemporary composer Paola Prestini for VIA project, among others. She collaborated with former Kronos Quartet cellist Jeff Zeigler in Lens Vivant, created and directed by Mexican visual artist Erika Harrsch, and later again with Harrsch, in the multimedia project, Dream Act (also "Under the same sky...we dream").

Herrera released her album Distancia in 2009. It was co-produced by Tim Ries, featuring pianist Aaron Goldberg and guitarist Lionel Loueke, the album quickly charted #1 in the iTunes jazz category.

In 2011, Mexico Azul was released, co-produced by Ries and recorded with John Patitucci, Luis Perdomo, Adam Rogers, Tim Hagans, Rogerio Boccato, and Alex Kautz. The album is a tribute to Mexican composers from the Golden Era of the 1930s and 1940s.

A year later, her compilation album, Lo Mejor de Magos Herrera was released.

Later, in the summer of 2013, Magos recorded Dawn, with multiple Grammy winner, producer, and guitarist from Spain, Javier Limón. Magos and Limón decided to record a second album and DVD for UN Women, and included on the project Fito Páez, Eugenia León, Grégoire Maret, Chabuco, and others, in support of the United Nations "He for She" campaign, which promoted gender equality. Herrera is a UN Women spokesperson.

Herrera recorded a tribute to Mexican poet Octavio Paz, by composer Felipe Perez Santiago, and she was invited as a guest artist in "La guitarra vuela", a documentary honoring the flamenco guitarist Paco de Lucía.

Along with other performers from the New York artist community, and under the artistic direction of Paola Prestini, Herrera is a curator for the National Sawdust, one of Brooklyn's performance venues.

As a performer, Herrera has appeared around the world at venues such as New York's Lincoln Center and UN Headquarters, Washington D.C.'s Kennedy Center, Chicago's Millennium Park, SFJazz in San Francisco, Teatro de la Ciudad de México, Sala Galileo Galilei in Madrid, New York Winter Jazz Festival and Paris' Duc des Lombards. In addition, she has participated in Montreal's International Jazz Festival, the Montreux Jazz Festival in Switzerland, Barcelona's International Jazz Festival, and more in the United States, Canada, Mexico, Puerto Rico, Colombia, Brazil, Spain, Holland, Switzerland, England, India, China, Japan, Malaysia, and Singapore.

== Teaching career ==
Herrera has also been an instructor since 2000, has been a guest professor for master classes and clinics at Berklee College in Boston, Central College in Pella, Iowa, Miami Dade College, Kuala Lumpur Music Academy, Escuela Superior de Música in Mexico City, and held academic residencies in Swarnabhoomi Academy of Music in Tamil Nadu, India, and the Langnau Jazz Camp in Switzerland in 2016.

== Nominations and grants ==
- In 2015, Herrera was given the Berklee Latin Masters Award in recognition of her contribution to the development and exposure of Latin American and her original music in a contemporary context around the world.
- In 2009, she was nominated for the International Grammy for Best Jazz Vocal Album with Distancia.
- In 2006 and 2009, was nominated for Best Jazz Performance by Lunas del Auditorio Nacional in Mexico City.
- From 2010 to 2013, was the recipient of Mexico National Grant Program for performing Artists, given by National Fund for Culture and the Arts. (FONCA)
- In 2011, was selected, along with Michelle Obama as one of the most important women of the year by Siempre Mujer magazine.

== TV & radio shows ==
Herrera produced and hosted two musical television programs for Mexico's arts and culture television channel, Canal 22, called "Acústico y Jazz Desde El Bajo Centro," with guests Ute Lemper, Jerry González, Diego el Cigala, among others.

When not touring, Herrera produces and hosts a weekly radio program from New York, entitled "La Vuelta a La Manzana" for Mexico's Public Radio, (IMER, Instituto Mexicano de la Radio), Horizonte Jazz 107.9 FM. Appearing on her show have been Miguel Zenon, Antonio Sánchez, and Peter Eldridge, and others.

== Theater ==
In 2005, Herrera was cast to be part of "Modelo para armar", a play by Pablo Mandoki that was performed at Mexico City's UNAM University Theater, Teatro Juan Ruiz de Alarcón.

In 2025, Herrera debuted Primero Sueno, a new opera she co-composed with Paola Prestini at The Met Cloisters based on the poem of the same name by Sor Juana. The opera was commissioned by The Metropolitan Museum of Art and Vision Into Art.

== Discography ==
=== Studio albums ===
Year	Album	Label
2000	Orquideas Susurrantes	Opcion Sonica
2002	Pais Maravilla	Suave Records
2005	Todo Puede Inspirar	EMI
2006	Soliluna	JM Distribuidores
2009	Distancia	Sunnyside
2011	Mexico Azul	Sony
2014	Magos & Limón:Dawn	OKeh
2015	Magos & Limón:He For She	Sony

=== Compilation albums ===
Year	Album	Country	Label
2002	Mexican Divas II	Mexico	Opción Sonica
2003	Mexican Divas III	Mexico	Opción Sónica
2004	Magos Herrera	Japan	Mecca Records
2007	Minha Historia	Brazil	Casser Brasil
2012	Lo Mejor de Magos Herrera	Mexico	JM Distribuidores

=== Recording collaborations ===
Collaborator	Year	Album	Label
2007	Iraida Noriega	Viaje de Mar	JM Distribuidores
2008	Tim Ries	The Rolling Stones Project II	Sunnyside
2008	Paola Prestini	Traveling Songs	VIA
2008	Beat Kaestli	Far from home	Independent
2013	Arturo Estable	Crosshatching	Origen Records
2013	Luis Muñoz	Luz	Pelin Music
2013	Eugenia León	Ciudadana Del Mundo 2	Universal Music
2015	Luis Muñoz	Voz	Pellin Music
2016	Felipe Pérez Santiago	Homenaje a Octiavio Paz	Independent
2016	Trio Afora Afora	Trio Afora Afora	Independent
2020	John Finbury	Quatro	Green Flash Music
