= Dovetail (album) =

Studio album by Lee Konitz Terzet
- Released: 1983
- Recorded: February 25 & 27, 1983
- Studio: Penthouse Recordings, NYC
- Genre: Jazz
- Length: 57:45
- Label: Sunnyside; SSC 1003
- Producer: François Zalacain

Lee Konitz chronology
Toot Sweet (1982)	Dovetail (1983)	Art of the Duo (1983)

Dovetail is an album by saxophonist Lee Konitz's Terzet, recorded in 1983 and released on the Sunnyside label.

== Critical reception ==
Professional ratings
Review scores
Source	Rating
AllMusic	4/5 stars
The Penguin Guide to Jazz Recordings	3/4 stars

The AllMusic review stated: "The repertoire is certainly a bit offbeat for these modernists ... but the musicians come up with fresh statements on all of the tunes. A continually interesting set, like most of Lee Konitz's recordings".

== Track listing ==
All compositions by Lee Konitz, Harold Danko and Jay Leonhart except where noted.

1. "I Want to Be Happy" (Vincent Youmans, Irving Caesar) – 9:42
2. "The Night Has a Thousand Eyes" (Buddy Bernier, Jerry Brainin) – 4:54
3. "Counter-Point" – 2:19
4. "Dovetail" – 7:45
5. "Sweet Georgia Brown" (Ben Bernie, Maceo Pinkard, Kenneth Casey) – 6:20
6. "Alone Together" (Arthur Schwartz, Howard Dietz) – 7:04
7. "Cherokee" (Ray Noble) – 9:11
8. "Penthouse Serenade (When We're Alone)" (Val Burton, Will Jason) – 3:27
9. "Play Fiddle Play" (Jerry Bock, Sheldon Harnick) – 8:04

== Personnel ==
- Lee Konitz – alto saxophone, soprano saxophone, tenor saxophone, vocals
- Harold Danko – piano
- Jay Leonhart – bass
