= Distancia (Magos Herrera album) =

Studio album by Magos Herrera
- Released: May 5, 2009
- Recorded: 2009
- Genre: Latin jazz, Latin pop
- Label: Sunnyside Records, Jm Distribuidores
- Producer: Tim Ries, Magos Herrera

Magos Herrera chronology
Minha Historia (2007)	Distancia (2009)	Mexico Azul (2010)

Singles from Distancia
- 1. "Reencuentro" Released: May 2009

Distancia (In English: Distance) is the fifth studio album by the Mexican jazz singer Magos Herrera, released on May 5, 2009. Tim Ries produced the album along with Herrera.

== Background and theme ==
Recorded in New York City, Distancia includes songs written by Herrera and by composers like Antonio Carlos Jobim and César Portillo de la Luz.

The record includes original themes "Reencuentro"; "Tus ojos"; "Staying Closer" and "Alegría", with scintillating vocal percussion interlacing with rhythmic Pan-Afro/American structures, with touches of sonorities that evoke Joni Mitchell, and pat-flavored flamenco, as well as reinterpretations of classic themes from Antonio Carlos Jobim, Milton Nascimento and César Portillo de la Luz "Retrato em Branco e preto", "Inutil Paisaje", "Dindi", "Veracruz" and "Tu, Mi Delirio".

== Track listing ==
1. "Reencuentro" (Reunion)
2. "Tus Ojos" (Your Eyes)
3. "New Song"
4. "Retrato Em Branco E Preto" (Portrait in Black And White)
5. "Inutil Paisaje" (Useless Landscape)
6. "Veracruz"
7. "Staying Closer"
8. "Tu, Mi Delirio" (You, My Delirium)
9. "Alegría" (Joy)
10. "Dindi"

== Personnel ==
1. Magos Herrera, vocals
2. Lionel Loueke, guitar
3. Aaron Goldberg, piano
4. Ricky Rodriguez, bass
5. Alex Kauta, drums
6. Jennifer Beaujean, Ingrid Beaujean, vocals
