= Meredith d'Ambrosio =

- Born: March 20, 1941 (age 84); Boston, Massachusetts
- Genres: Jazz
- Occupation: Musician
- Instruments: Vocals; piano
- Years active: 1970s–present
- Labels: Palo Alto, Sunnyside
- Website: Meredith d'Ambrosio at the Wayback Machine (archived 17 January 2020)

Meredith d'Ambrosio (born March 20, 1941) is an American jazz singer from Boston, Massachusetts.

== Career ==
D'Ambrosio was born into a musical family and took piano lessons beginning at the age of six. In 1958 she spent a year at the Boston Museum School, then pursued a career in painting and music. She rejected an offer to tour with John Coltrane in 1966. Over ten years later she recorded her debut album, mostly providing her own piano accompaniment. In 1988, d'Ambrosio and jazz pianist Eddie Higgins were married and became a popular team at clubs and festivals, as well as recording for Sunnyside Records. She appeared on the radio program Piano Jazz with Marian McPartland in 1994.

In addition to singing and playing piano, she is a composer, lyricist, painter, calligrapher, and teacher. Her album Out of Nowhere (2000) was nominated for the Django Award by the French Academy of Jazz.

== Discography ==
- Lost in His Arms (Spring, 1980)
- Another Time (Shiah, 1981)
- Little Jazz Bird (Palo Alto, 1982)
- It's Your Dance (Sunnyside, 1985)
- The Cove (Sunnyside, 1988)
- South to a Warmer Place (Sunnyside, 1989)
- Love Is Not a Game (Sunnyside, 1991)
- Shadowland (Sunnyside, 1993)
- Sleep Warm (Sunnyside, 1994)
- Beware of Spring! (Sunnyside, 1995)
- Silent Passion (Sunnyside, 1997)
- Echo of a Kiss (Sunnyside, 1998)
- Out of Nowhere (Sunnyside, 2000)
- Love Is for the Birds (Sunnyside, 2002)
- Wishing on the Moon (Sunnyside, 2006)
- By Myself (Sunnyside, 2012)
- Sometime Ago (Sunnyside, 2021)
- Midnight Mood with Frédéric Loiseau (Sunnyside, 2025)
