= Toot Sweet =

Live album by Lee Konitz and Michel Petrucciani
- Released: 1982
- Recorded: 25 May 1982
- Venue: Centre Musical Bosendorfer, Paris
- Genre: Jazz
- Length: 47:36
- Label: Owl; OWL 028
- Producer: Guy Van Minden and Jean-Jacques Pussiau

Lee Konitz chronology
| High Jingo (1982) | Toot Sweet (1982) | Dovetail (1983) |

Michel Petrucciani chronology
| Estate (1982) | Toot Sweet (1982) | Oracle's Destiny (1982) |

Toot Sweet is a live album by saxophonist Lee Konitz and pianist Michel Petrucciani which was recorded in Paris in 1982 and released on the French Owl label. The album was rereleased on CD in the US on Sunnyside.

== Critical reception ==
Professional ratings
Review scores
| Source | Rating |
|---|---|
| Allmusic | 4/5 stars |
| The Penguin Guide to Jazz Recordings | 3/4 stars |

The Allmusic review stated "This 1982 meeting between the veteran alto saxophonist Lee Konitz and the young pianist (19 at the time of the session) Michel Petrucciani is a success on all counts. Konitz's fragile alto is complemented by Petrucciani's lush backing".

== Track listing ==
1. "I Hear a Rhapsody" (George Fragos, Jack Baker, Dick Gasparre) – 4:43
2. "To Erlinda" (Michel Petrucciani) – 5:03
3. "'Round About Midnight" (Thelonious Monk, Cootie Williams, Bernie Hanighen) – 16:00
4. "Lover Man" (Jimmy Davis, Ram Ramirez, Jimmy Sherman) – 15:35
5. "Ode" (Lee Konitz) – 4:46
6. "Lovelee" (Konitz, Petrucciani) – 2:11

== Personnel ==
- Lee Konitz – alto saxophone
- Michel Petrucciani – piano
