= Tony Tixier =

- Born: February 26, 1986 (age 40); Montreuil, Seine-Saint-Denis
- Genre: Jazz
- Occupation: Musician
- Instrument: Piano
- Website: www.tixiertony.com

Tony Tixier (born 26 February 1986 in Montreuil, France) is a French jazz pianist.

== Biography ==
Scott Tixier & Tony Tixier with Janet Cardiff & George Miller at the Louis Vuitton Foundation in Paris 2014

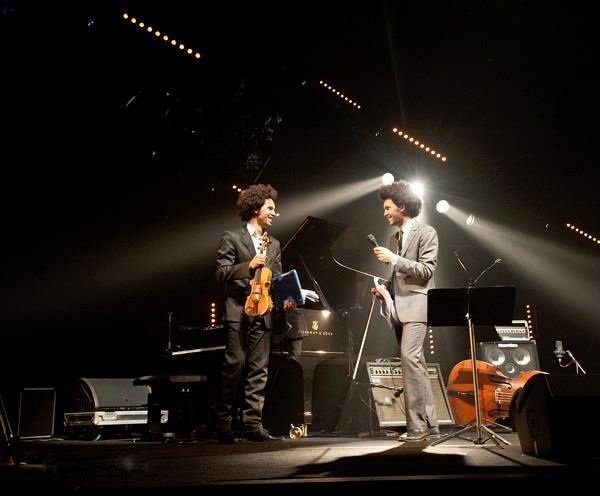
Tony Tixier and Scott Tixier opening for Herbie Hancock and Chris Dave at the festival jazz en tête

Tony Tixier was born in Montreuil and studied classical piano at the conservatory. He made his first stage appearance at age seven. He studied choral, classical harmony and counterpoint, writing and composition. At age twelve, he graduated (DFE) in musical training with honors, and in classical piano (DFE) in Pascal Gallet's class at fourteen.

In 2009, Tixier signed Parallel Worlds, his first album in septet with bold orchestral writings that defines itself as a laboratory of sounds and climates, perfectly illustrating his clear interest in orchestration and musical research.

In 2012, he joined the SpaceTime Record label for which he recorded the album Dream Pursuit with his quartet featuring Justin Brown, Logan Richardson and Earl Burniss Travis. The album was labeled a "revelation" by Jazz Magazine.

In 2012 he opened for Herbie Hancock at the Jazz En Tete Festival in Clermont-Ferrand with his twin brother, violinist Scott Tixier.

In 2013, he founded the chamber ensemble Moon Paradox for which he composed a concertino for piano and string quintet in seven movements, mixing classical writing with jazz and contemporary music. In addition, he led an intense concert activity in France and abroad.

In 2014, Tony and Scott Tixier starred in commissioned work by the Artist Janet Cardiff. They also improvised and composed the music for this project that was a part of the inaugural program for the Louis Vuitton Foundation Paris (building architect Frank Gehry).

In 2015, he began to play at Radio City Music Hall as the pianist for the NBC TV show America's Got Talent.

In 2016 he played on The Tonight Show Starring Jimmy Fallon and performed in a Tommy Hilfiger campaign with top model Gigi Hadid.

In 2017 Tixier signed as an exclusive Yamaha Artist for Yamaha music corporation.

== Discography ==
As leader:

- 2006: Fall in Flowers – Tony Tixier Trio
- 2007: Electric Trane – Tony Tixier solo
- 2009: Parallel Worlds – Tony Tixier septet
- 2012: Dream Pursuit (Space Time Records) – Tony Tixier quartet
- 2017: Life of Sensitive Creatures (Whirlwind recordings) – Tony Tixier trio
- 2020: I AM HUMAN (Tixmusic) - Tony Tixier
- 2021: Moonshine (Tixmusic) - T Tixier & D Freiss

As sideman:

- 2007: Roll the Dice (Yvonnick Prene Group)
- 2008: As a Monkey (Donald Devienne Group)
- 2010: Des mots détonent (JLS hip hop)
- 2011: Roz Jeriko (Veronique Hermann Sambin)
- 2013: Hapalemur (Renaud Gensane)
- 2013: Our Journey (Hermon Mehari 'Diverse')
- 2014: Elements (Joachim Govin)
- 2017: Strings (Ryan J Lee)
- 2019: Guardians of the heart machine (Seamus Blake quartet)
- 2019: Scopes (Scopes)
- 2020: Present (Joachim Govin)
- 2020: A Change for The Dreamlike (Hermon Mehari)
- 2020: Wholeness (Ray Colom)
- 2023: Hymns (Carlo Muscat)
