= Soliluna =

Studio album by Magos Herrera, Iraida Noriega
- Released: January 1, 2006 (United States) (Mexico)
- Recorded: 2006
- Genre: Latin jazz, Latin pop
- Label: Jm Distribuidores

Magos Herrera, Iraida Noriega chronology
Todo Puede Inspirar (2005)	Soliluna (2006)	Minha Historia (2007)

Singles from Soliluna
- 1. "Soliluna" Released: December 2006

"Soliluna", is a Duet Studio album by the Latin Jazz Mexican Singers Magos Herrera and Iraida Noriega.

== Track listing ==
1. "Soliluna"
2. "Estrellita" (Little Star)
3. "New Song (Only Myself)"
4. "Y Entonces" (And Then)
5. "Modhina"
6. "Lonely Woman (Round Midnight)"
7. "Nature Boy"
8. "Tu Risa" (Your Laugh)
9. "Stop Blaming The Moon"
10. "Chovendo Na Roseira"
11. "El Patzcuaro"
