= Suzanne Pagé =

French curator and museum director (born 1941)

Suzanne Pagé (born in 1941 in Brittany) is a French curator and museum director. She is currently the artistic director of the Louis Vuitton Foundation for Creation in Paris.

== Career ==
=== Musée d'Art Moderne de la Ville de Paris ===
In 1973 Pagé began to run the ARC (Animation/Research/Confrontation) research and exhibition area within the Musée d'Art Moderne de la Ville de Paris. Pagé became the director of the Musée d'Art Moderne de la Ville de Paris in Paris in 1988, a position she held until 2007 when she was succeeded by Fabrice Hergott.

=== Louis Vuitton Foundation for Creation ===
In 2006 Pagé was appointed as the artistic director of Louis Vuitton Foundation for Creation. The Foundation will exhibit artworks from the LVMH collection alongside contemporary temporary exhibitions. The Foundation is located in the Bois de Boulogne in Paris and was designed by the architect Frank Gehry. The Foundation is due to open to the public in the fall of 2014.

== Recognition ==
In 2008 Pagé was awarded the Art Cologne Prize.

In 2014 Pagé was listed as one of the Most Influential Women in the European Art World by Artnet.

== See also ==
- Louis Vuitton Foundation for Creation
