= Brooklyn Bazaar =

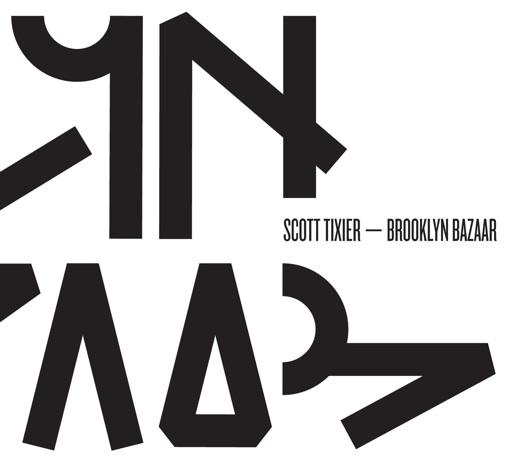

Studio album by Scott Tixier
- Released: March 13, 2012
- Recorded: September 2011
- Studio: Systems Two Studios, Brooklyn
- Genre: Jazz
- Label: Sunnyside Records
- Producer: François Zalacain

Scott Tixier chronology
Brooklyn Bazaar (2012)	Cosmic Adventure (2016)

Professional ratings
Review scores
Source	Rating
theworldmusicreport	4/5 stars
Deezer	5/5 stars
Jazzarium	4/5 stars
The New York City Jazz Record	favorable
CriticalJazz	favorable
Fnac	coup de coeur
All About Jazz	favorable
Jazz Magazine	favorable
JazzTimes	favorable
NPR	Song of the day

Brooklyn Bazaar is Scott Tixier's debut album recorded in Brooklyn in September 2011 and co-produced by Jean-Luc Ponty and Mark Feldman. It was released in March 2012 by Sunnyside Records and was well received by critics (NPR "Song of the day"; "Coup De Coeur" Fnac; The New York City Jazz Record;). Brooklyn Bazaar was listed in the JazzTimes Top 50 CDs of 2012.

== Track listing ==
All songs by Scott Tixier

1. "Keep in Touch" – 6:02
2. "Bushwick Party" – 5:45
3. "Arawaks" – 4:12
4. "Elephant Rose" – 6:38
5. "String Theory" – 6:06
6. "Miss Katsu" – 4:58
7. "Facing Windows" – 7:20
8. "Shopping with Mark F" – 5:17
9. "Roach Dance" – 5:16

== Personnel ==
- Scott Tixier – violin
- Douglas Bradford – guitars
- Jesse Elder – electric keyboards and acoustic piano
- Massimo Biolcati – bass
- Arthur Vint – drums
- Emilie Weibel – vocal

Technical Credits

- Dave Darlington (2 Grammy Awards) - Mixing/Mastering
- François Zalacain - Executive Producer
- Rob Mosher - Producer
- Mike Marciano (2 Grammy Awards) - Engineer
- Bryan Parker - Film director
- Gregg Conde - Cinematography
- Erik Haberfeld - Graphic Design
- Corelli Savarez - Executive Producer
- Chell Stephen - Cinematography
- Mark Feldman - Quotation Author
- Jean-Luc Ponty - Quotation Author
