= Glenn Zaleski =

American jazz keyboardist and composer

- Born: 1987 or 1988; Boylston, Massachusetts, U.S.
- Genres: Jazz
- Occupations: Musician, composer, arranger
- Instruments: Piano, keyboards
- Label: Sunnyside
- Website: glennzaleski.com

Glenn Zaleski is an American jazz pianist, keyboardist, composer, and arranger.

== Early life ==
Zaleski was born and raised in Boylston, Massachusetts. His parents were Bob and Barbara Zaleski. He has an older brother, Mark, who plays the saxophone. Glenn took piano lessons from the age of seven. He played in an elementary school jazz band. While at high school, he had gigs in the Worcester, Massachusetts area. In 2004 he attended the Brubeck Institute's Summer Jazz Colony. He graduated from Tahanto Regional High School in 2005.

Zaleski received a two-year fellowship to study at the Brubeck Institute at the University of the Pacific (2005–07), then completed his degree at The New School. In 2006 he played with Dave Brubeck at the Monterey Jazz Festival.

== Later life and career ==
Zaleski appeared on two trio albums with bassist Rick Rosato and drummer Colin Stranahan.

Zaleski's My Ideal, released by Sunnyside Records, contained both standards and Zaleski originals. Nate Chinen, reviewing My Ideal for The New York Times, wrote that some of the playing was "a little too close to the aesthetic territory of Brad Mehldau. [...] But if there is any unfinished business on this accomplished first outing, it involves a stronger claim to originality."

He played piano and keyboards on violinist Tomoko Omura's Roots. As of 2015, Zaleski is based in New York City.

== Playing style ==
Zaleski acknowledges Bill Evans as an influence on his playing style. Chinen noted Zaleski's "subtleties of touch [...] along with his fluent but unhurried sense of phrase".

== Discography ==
An asterisk (*) indicates that the year is that of release.

=== As leader/co-leader ===
| Year recorded | Title | Label | Personnel/Notes |
|---|---|---|---|
| 2010* | Duet Suite | | Duo, with Mark Zaleski (sax) |
| 2011* | Anticipation | Capri | Trio, co-led with Rick Rosato (bass), Colin Stranahan (drums) |
| 2013* | Limitless | Capri | Trio, co-led with Rick Rosato (bass), Colin Stranahan (drums) |
| 2014 | My Ideal | Sunnyside | Most tracks trio, with Dezron Douglas (bass), Craig Weinrib (drums); one track quartet, with Ravi Coltrane (tenor sax) added |
| 2017 | Fellowship | Sunnyside | Trio, with Dezron Douglas (bass), Craig Weinrib (drums) |
| 2020* | The Question | Sunnyside | Most tracks quintet, with Adam O'Farrill (trumpet), Lucas Pino (tenor sax), Desmond White (bass), Allan Mednard (drums); one track sextet, with Yotam Silberstein (guitar) added; one track nonet, with Nick Finzer (trombone), Andrew Gutauskas (baritone sax), Alex LoRe (alto sax), Andrew Renfroe (guitar) added |
| 2023 | Star Dreams | Sunnyside | Trio, with Dezron Douglas (bass), Willie Jones III (drums) |

=== As sideman ===
| Year recorded | Leader | Title | Label |
|---|---|---|---|
| 2015* | Isaac Darche | Team & Variations | Challenge |
| 2015* | Tomoko Omura | Roots | Inner Circle |
| 2015* | Lucas Pino | No Net Nonet | Origin |
| 2016* | Scott Tixier | Cosmic Adventure | Sunnyside Records |
| 2017* | Lucas Pino | The Answer Is No | Outside In Music |
| 2021* | Gabriel Vicéns | The Way We Are Created | Inner Circle Music |
