= Jonny King =

American jazz musician

Jonathan Z. King (born 2 February 1965) is an American jazz pianist, attorney, fisherman, and writer.

Raised in New York City, King graduated from Princeton University and Harvard Law School and works as an intellectual property attorney.

As well as recording under his own name, he has performed with Eddie Harris, Vincent Herring, Christian McBride, OTB, Joshua Redman, Mark Turner, and Steve Wilson. He has performed around the world and is a regular in New York City's jazz clubs. He is the author of What Jazz Is (Walker Publishing), a primer on jazz listening published in conjunction with a CD prepared by Blue Note Records.

King is also a fly tyer and fisherman. He is a member of the "Pro Team" for Tuffleye and has hosted tying classes and demonstrations. King is credited for creating his own variation of the Muddler Minnow pattern he named the "Kinky Muddler" and written numerous articles on the topic for magazines such as Fly Fisherman and Salt Water Sportsman.

== Discography ==
- 1994: In from the Cold (Criss Cross) with Vincent Herring, Mark Turner, Ira Coleman, Billy Drummond
- 1996: Notes from the Underground (Enja) with Joshua Redman, Steve Nelson, Peter Washington
- 1997: The Meltdown (Enja) with Larry Grenadier, Milton Cardona, David Sanchez, Steve Wilson, Steve Davis
- 2012: Above All (Sunnyside) with Ed Howard and Victor Lewis
