= Nick Sanders (musician) =

American jazz musician

- Origin: New Orleans, Louisiana, U.S.
- Genres: Jazz
- Occupations: Musician, composer
- Instrument: Piano
- Years active: 2011–present
- Label: Sunnyside
- Website: nicksandersmusic.com

Nick Sanders is an American jazz pianist and composer, as well as the leader of the eponymously named Nick Sanders Trio. He has recorded three studio albums for Sunnyside Records: Nameless Neighbors (2013) and You Are a Creature (2015), with his trio band including bassist Henry Fraser and drummer Connor Baker, and Janus (2016), a duo album with saxophonist Logan Strosahl.

== Early life and influences ==
Sanders grew up in New Orleans, Louisiana. He started playing piano when he was seven years old, focusing on the classical repertoire. He attended the New Orleans Center for Creative Arts (NOCCA), a public performing and visual arts high school, graduating in 2006. While at NOCCA, he switched from classical to jazz piano and studied with the clarinetist Alvin Batiste. As a teenager, he occasionally played piano with Batiste, including performances at Snug Harbor in the French Quarter. Sanders later earned a bachelor's and master's degree from the New England Conservatory of Music (NEC), where he studied with the pianists Fred Hersch, Jason Moran, and Danilo Pérez. Hersch has compared Sanders to Keith Jarrett.

== Career ==
After graduation, Sanders established residence in New York City. While at NEC, Sanders had formed the Nick Sanders Trio with two classmates, bassist Henry Fraser and drummer Connor Baker. In 2013, the band released Nameless Neighbors on Sunnyside Records. The album was produced by Fred Hersch. Of the thirteen tracks on the record, ten are original Sanders' compositions. The album was included in The Times-Picayune's "2013 list of best jazz records".

In 2015, Sunnyside Records released the trio's second album, entitled You Are a Creature, which like their debut was produced by Hersch. The recording includes twelve original Sanders compositions and a cover of Ornette Coleman's "The Blessing". In February 2015, the album was included in DownBeat's "Editors' Picks". In describing the album, JAZZIZ Magazine's James Rozzi writes, "With his forward-leaning trio... pianist Nick Sanders has culled a set of music as mysterious as the CD's title." Rozzi praises the band's nontraditional style which includes "odd meters, rapidly changing tonalities and stretched-out song forms". He points out that Sanders' through-composed music, which is often "jagged or ethereal", works to further distinguish the band as unique.

In 2016, Sanders released his third studio album with Sunnyside Records. Instead of his usual trio, he partnered with saxophonist Logan Strosahl. Their collaboration features improvisation on several forms of western music from the 14th century to the present. Additionally, several of the tracks are original compositions by either Sanders or Strosahl. The album is named after the Roman god Janus, a two-faced god representing the album's view into music's past and future. According to DownBeat critic Yoshi Kato, the "title track showcases the pair's locked-in playing style and instinctive almost sibling-like ability to respond to one another."

== Discography ==
=== As leader ===
With Nick Sanders Trio

- 2013 - Nameless Neighbors (Sunnyside Records)
- 2015 - You Are A Creature (Sunnyside)
- 2019 - Playtime 2050 (Sunnyside)

Duo album with Logan Strosahl

- 2016 - Janus (Sunnyside)

=== As sideman ===
With Logan Strosahl Team

- 2015 - Up Go We (Sunnyside)
- 2017 - Book I of Arthur (Sunnyside)

With Jeong Lim Yang

- 2017 - Déjà Vu (Fresh Sound)
