= Yvonnick Prené =

- Born: Île-de-France, France
- Genres: jazz
- Occupations: Composer, Harmonicaist, Professor, Bandleader
- Instruments: Harmonica, Piano,
- Years active: 2006–present
- Labels: SteepleChase Records, Naive, Rodeadope Records, Origin Records
- Website: www.yvonnickprene.com

Yvonnick Prené is a French harmonica player and a recording artist.

== Life and career ==
Born in Paris, he began as a guitarist, later switching to the diatonic harmonica, and eventually settling on the chromatic harmonica as his primary instrument. He first began playing the harmonica in Parisian clubs at 17, then started his studies at Sorbonne University, from which he received a master's degree in music (2011). While still enrolled at the Sorbonne, Prené relocated to New York City and was awarded multiple full-tuition scholarships at The City College of New York, (MICEFA, 2007), Columbia University (Alliance Program, 2008) and at the New School for Jazz and Contemporary Music (Merit-Based Scholarship, 2009) where he had the opportunity to study with Lee Konitz and Reggie Workman among others. In 2011-2012 he earned a BA from The New School for Jazz & Contemporary Music and Master's degree from Sorbonne University.

He has performed and recorded with a wide range of artists, including Geoffrey Keezer, Dev Hynes Bill Stewart, Dayna Stephens, Kevin Hays, Jeremy Pelt, Klingande, Romeo Santos, Peter Bernstein, Scott Tixier, Gene Bertoncini, Rich Perry, Steve Cardenas, Jon Cowherd, Vic Juris, Nate Smith, Ira Coleman, Thomas Enhco, Luques Curtis, Justin Brown, Jerome Barde, Lorin Cohen, Mike Moreno, Avi Rothebard, Jared Gold, Anthony Wonsey, Clovis Nicholas, Laurent Cugny, Alexandre Tassel, Radam Schwartz, Dana Hall, Gilad Hekselman, Jon Davis,Yaron Herman, Laurent de Wilde, Ryan Cohan, Victor Provost among many others. Yvonnick has played at The Tonight Show Starring Jimmy Fallon, Blue Note Jazz Club, Smalls Jazz Club at the Iridium Jazz Club, The Jazz Gallery at Birdland (New York jazz club) at Bern Jazz Festival, Festival Emoi du Jazz (Côte d'Ivoire), Lamentin Jazz Festival, Green Mill Cocktail Lounge, at Jazz in Marciac, Hyde Park Jazz Festival (Chicago), Sidedoor Jazz Club, Jazz Gallery, Jazz on Ubaye, Jazz Sur Seine Festival, at Le Duc des Lombards.

Yvonnick is the founder of New York Harmonica School, Harmonica Studio author of several books and bandleader of Yvonnick Prené quartet. Yvonnick is a Hohner Ambassador.

== Discography ==
As leader

- Un Harmonica pour Django, Minor Major Music, (2025)
- Jobim's World, Sunnyside Records, (2024)
- LISTEN!, Sunnyside Records, (2023)
- New York Moments, SteepleChase Records, (2019)
- Jour de Fête, Steeplechase Records, (2013)

As sideman

- Status Quo, Antoine Cara,(2025)
- Lady in Waiting, Brian Penry,(2023)
- Real Slim Shady But Faster, Anthony Vincent,(2022)
- Wings of a Dove, Mi Yiten Li, Cedars of Lebanonn/ BMAD Music, (2021)
- Pause, Taj Weeks, Jatta Records(2021)
- Since You've Been Around, Alia Sheffield + Sold'D' Out, Fairground Records, (2020)

== Bibliography ==
- 100 Jazz Patterns for Chromatic Harmonica Vol 1, (2015)
- Jazz Etudes for Chromatic Harmonica Vol1, (2015)
- 100 Easy Blues Harmonica Licks, (2016)]
- Easy Harmonica Songbook for Chromatic Harmonica (2016)
- Easy Harmonica Songbook for Diatonic Harmonica (2016)
