= Pais Maravilla =

Studio album by Magos Herrera
- Released: November 2, 2004 USA; August, 2003 Mexico
- Recorded: 2003
- Genre: Latin jazz, Latin pop
- Length: 54:55
- Label: Suave Records/Jm Distribuidores

Magos Herrera chronology
Orquideas Susurrantes (2000)	Pais Maravilla (2004)	Magos Herrera (2004)

Singles from Pais Maravilla
- 1. "Agua" Released: August 2003; 2. "Somos" Released: August 2003

Pais Maravilla (In English: Wonderland), is the third studio album by the Latin jazz Mexican singer Magos Herrera.

== Background and theme ==
Three of the nine tracks inspired by Magos Herrera and the reminiscence of a classic Cuban lullaby "Drume Negrita" by Eliseo Grenet. Includes some Portuguese and Spanish versions as well as a remix.

In 2003, Magos announces its third highly successful album "Pais Maravilla" / Suave Records. Since its launch this disc is positioned at the top of the Mexican sales in jazz and world music as "disc of the week" by Image 90.5 and 107.9 FM. I took the tour in Mexico, Spain and Japan to give concerts in forums such as the Chamber Galileo Galilei, and Suristán and FNAC Callao in Madrid and in Osaka, Tokyo and Chigasaki in Japan.

== Critical reception ==
Evan C. Gutierrez of Allmusic gave a positive review, noting "Her melodic sense and sensitivity make up for her evident lack of raw power."

== Track listing ==
1. "Agua" (Water)
2. "Somos" (We Are)
3. "País Maravilla" (Wonderland)
4. "Serafín" (Serafin)
5. "Princesa Caballero" (Princess/Knight)
6. "La Espera" (The Longing)
7. "Necesito Un Sol" (Need a Sun)
8. "Son Cotidiano" (Daily "Son")
9. "Luna Menguante" (Decreasing Moon)
10. "Drumme Negrita" (Cuban Lullaby)
11. "A Espera" (La Espera - Portuguese Version) (The Longing)
12. "Somos (We Are) (Remix 1)
13. "Somos (We Are) (Remix 2)
