= Jazz in Mexico =

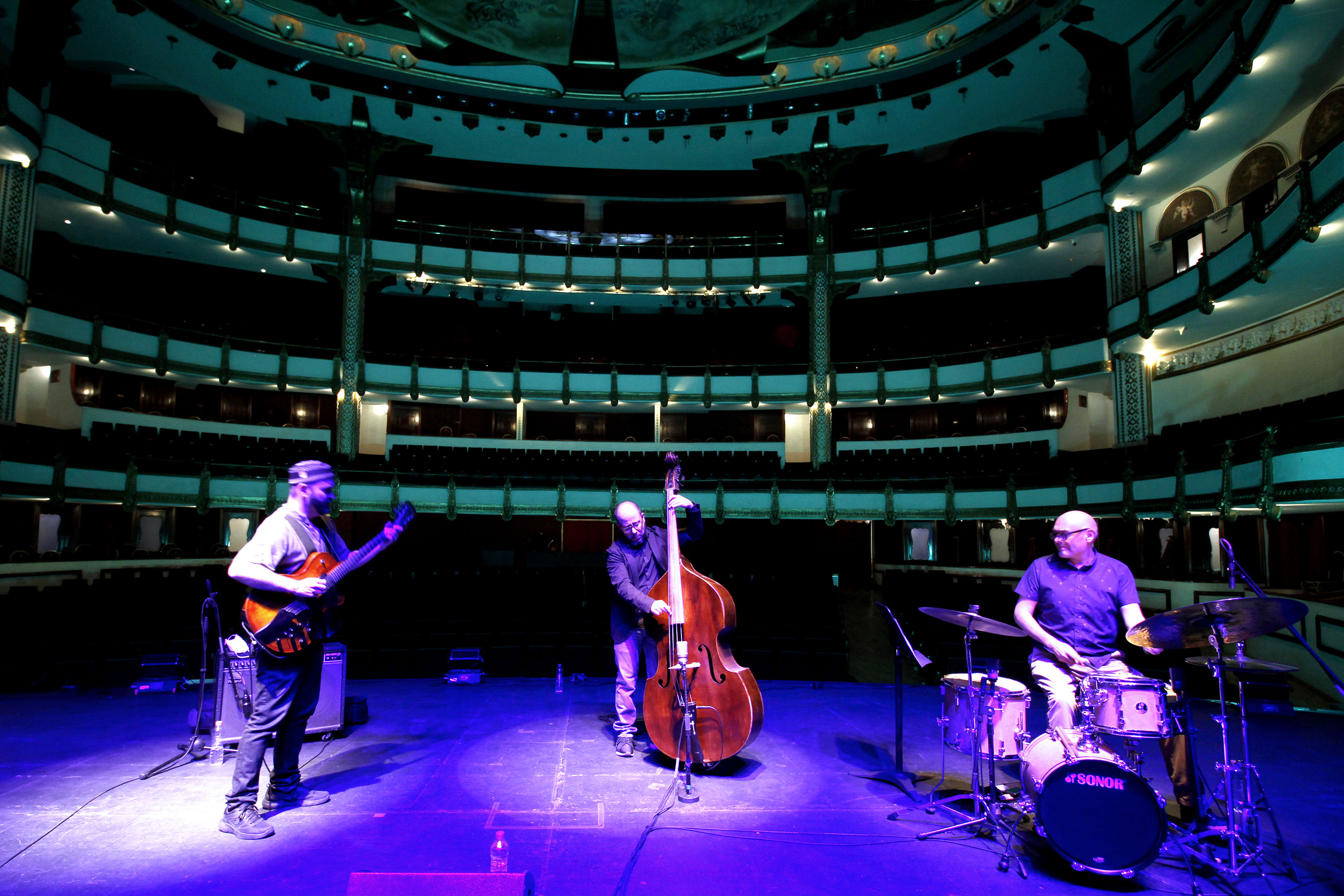

Jazz in the United States, had its start in New Orleans and is known for its complexities, fusion, and improvisational efforts, which later diffused to Mexico. Because of that, an influx of Mexican and Afro-Mexicans have influenced the genre and vice-versa.

== History of jazz in Mexico ==
From 1900 - 1960 the jazz phenomenon occurring in the U.S. transcended onto Mexico as well. This was able to happen due to the Afrodiasporic network that shaped jazz and took it through the Gulf of Mexico to lower North America.

Around the 1920's economic prosperity in Mexico made Mexico City, a desirable spot for Afro-Antillean migrants who brought the presence of Afro-Antillean Music. Early recordings of jazz in Mexico can be traced back to the late 1920s.

In the 1930's majority of the music scene in the United States was jazz. And in Mexico, American music had the most prominence in Mexican music media. This was also due in part because Mexico already had variations of jazz such as Mexican Waltz, Blues, and Danzon creating a very similar cultural product that simultaneously emerged alongside the United States.

Throughout the 1940's Hispanic musicians learned to compose, and translate jazz learned in the United States, and they would bring it back to Mexico to start their own jazz groups. And the big band format became extremely popularized in Mexico in this time period.

In the 1950's a new generation of jazz artists came in and left behind the big orchestra format of jazz. They started smaller bands that would focus on smaller niches of people. This is known of the "golden era" of jazz in Mexico. Heavily propelled by movies. The golden age in Mexico reached its peak, due to the involvement of the United States in WWII.

Meanwhile, in the 1960's jazz had an established social position in Mexican culture. Previously it had been known as a niche, but popular music genre for nighttime enjoyment and dancing. However it was now established as music for the elite. Jazz was in this time period diffused through theater instead of movies. During this time as well the economic stability in Mexico was able to bring in international jazz musicians from the United States to Mexico, such as Ella Fitzgerald.

In the 1970's Mexico deviates from the American jazz culture. This is the time period where jazz is being fused with Mexican rock. At first jazz was being mixed with rock n' roll to be introduced to Mexican audience, but later on younger generations would create more distinction between the genres.

In the year 1978, was the first jazz festival held in one of Mexico's biggest universities. The festival was called "Festival internacional del jazz" and it was hosted by Universidad Nacional Autónoma de México (UNAM).

During the 1980's is where the decline of jazz in Mexico can be observed. This decline can also be attributed to the shift audiences had from being interested in the big orchestra format to small group structures called "combos".

But in the 1990's, although there is a further lack of support, this decade produced the most recording in the jazz genre in Mexico.

== Key influencers ==
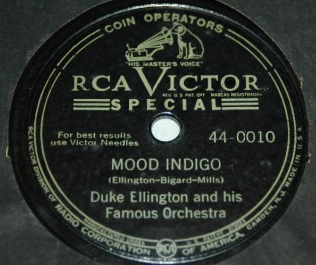
RCA vinyl record - RCA was one of the first record labels to set up producing factories for jazz in Mexico. And produced records for big names such as Duke Ellington.

=== Mexican Jazz in media ===
In 1935 American record labels contributed to the growing jazz culture by setting up production plants in Mexico. The first and most notable one being RCA Victor (later known as just RCA), world renowned record label now under Sony. However, although it increased the reach of jazz and Afro-Antillean variations, only the wealthiest elites could afford (initially). Despite this, radio technologies began improving at this time allowing underclass families and individuals access to jazz.

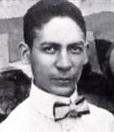
Jelly Roll Morton- Pillar in jazz community

=== Jelly Roll Morton ===
Jelly Roll Morton was one of the first composers of jazz in New Orleans. From Creole decent, he was born in New Orleans. Jelly Roll would use Spanish/Latin influence to produce his jazz records even referring to it as the "Spanish/Latin tinge". This "tinge" is essentially the tresillo-habanera rhythm. This inspiration from Latin America was a big influence of the blues, thus popularizing Latin inspired jazz and cultivating the foundations of jazz in Mexico.

=== Big Bands ===
The big band format was impactful when initially introduced and still influences modern Mexican music today. This genre was so heavily popularized that it caused competition with other popular genres of the time such as Ranchera, Danzon, and Boleros.

== Mexico City ==
In Mexico City there was a blend of seasoned veterans and beginner jazz musicians. Anyone who goes to Mexico City will see a multitude of jazz cafes, underground jazz bars, and various jazz bands all working together from various backgrounds.

Jazz musicians from all over the country often go to Mexico City to realize their jazz talents, bringing musicians from diverse musical backgrounds such as marimba or Mexican rock.

== Modern development of jazz music in Mexico ==
Jazz in the modern century and decades has been established as more of an individual endeavor now taking place in smaller venues rather than designated musician halls.

Due to events such as the COVID-19, the jazz scene in Mexico has been heavily limited, especially since it has been known to take place in small, confined spaces.
