= Scott Tixier =

French jazz violinist and professor

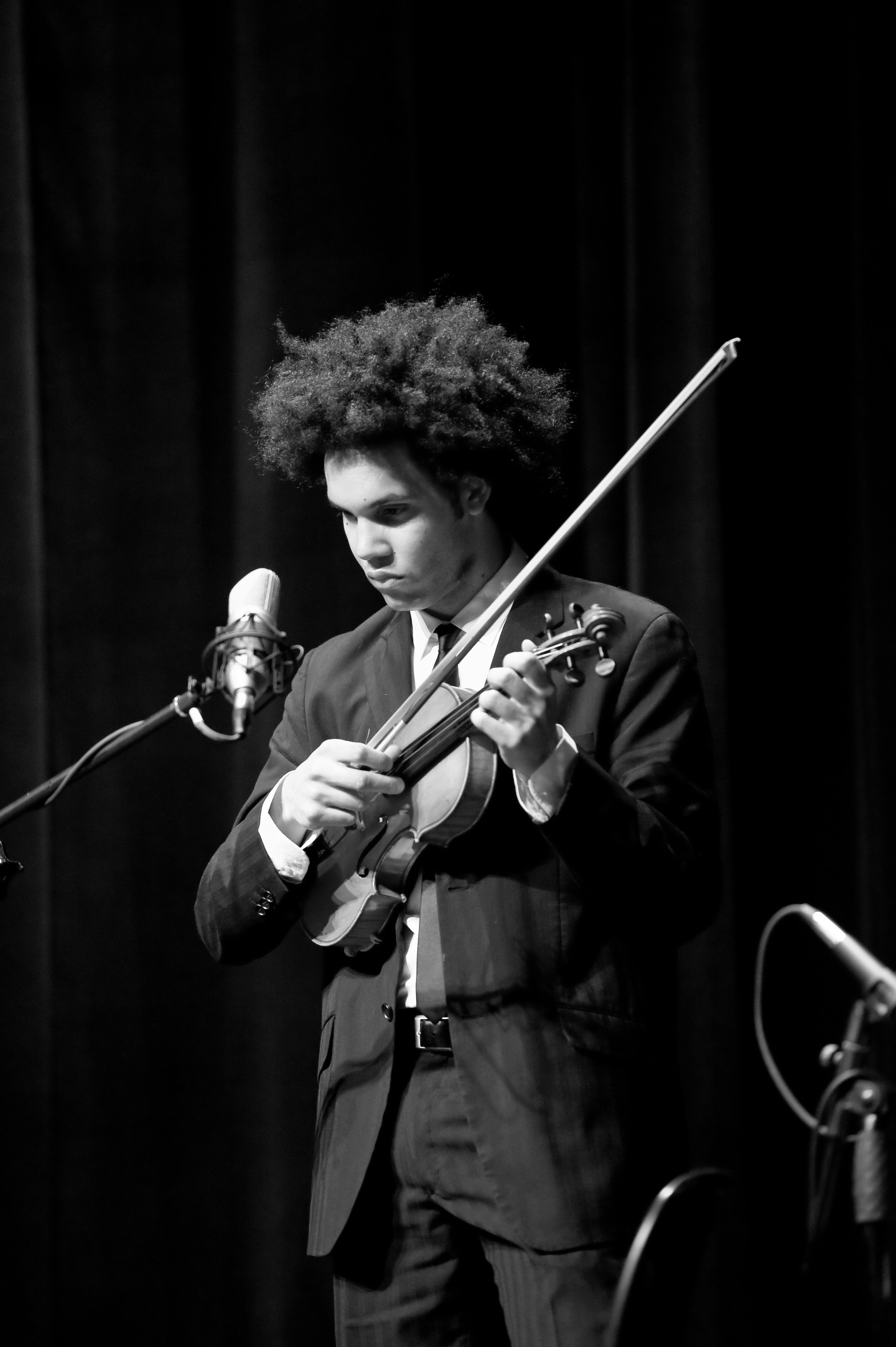

Background information
- Born: 26 February 1986; Montreuil, France
- Genres: Jazz
- Occupation: Musician
- Instrument: Violin
- Years active: 2002–present
- Label: Sunnyside
- Website: scotttixiermusic.com

Scott Tixier
- Citizenship: France; United States (from 2023)
- Relatives: Tony Tixier (twin brother)

Scott Tixier (born 26 February 1986) is a French-born jazz violinist and professor of jazz violin at the University of North Texas.

== Life and career ==
Tixier was born in Montreuil, France, and studied classical violin at the Conservatoire de Paris in Paris. Following that, he studied improvisation as a self-taught jazz musician and under Florin Niculescu then Malo Vallois.

Tixier has worked in theater, film scoring, Broadway shows, for Sony Pictures, ARTE Creative, Heineken, Dos Equis, Fisher-Price, America's Got Talent on NBC, with Zedd on the David Letterman Late Show on CBS, for Josh Groban, Harvey Keitel, Robert De Niro, Sting, Jean Reno, Whoopi Goldberg, Marc Jacobs, Keith David, Pierre Palmade, Pierre Richard, David Ackroyd, NBA player Allan Houston, Christina Aguilera, Chrisette Michele, Doug E. Fresh, JR, Ariana Grande, and Monica Dogra.

He has performed and recorded with Stevie Wonder, Elton John, Roger Waters, Kenny Barron, John Legend, Chris Potter, Christina Aguilera, Common, Anthony Braxton, Joss Stone, Gladys Knight, Natalie Cole, Wayne Brady, Chris Walden, Greg Phillinganes, Ray Chew, The Isley Brothers, Cory Smythe, Maceo Parker, Janet Cardiff, Siegfried Kessler, Tony Middleton, Lonnie Plaxico, Myron Walden, Clifford Adams (Kool & the Gang), Helen Sung, Brice Wassy, Gerald Cleaver, Lew Soloff, Yvonnick Prene, Tigran Hamasyan, James Weidman, Marcus McLauren, Giada Valenti, and Tommy Sims.

He played at Carnegie Hall, the Radio City Music Hall, Madison Square Garden, Barclays Center, the Golden Globes, Jazz at Lincoln Center, the Blue Note Jazz Club, the Apollo Theater, the Smalls Jazz Club, The Stone, Roulette, Smoke Jazz, Hammerstein Ballroom, Joe's Pub, Williamsburg Music Center, Prudential Center and the United States Capitol.

On 22 October 2016 Tixier was performing with Kevin Spacey, Cassandra Wilson, Patti Austin, Andra Day, David Alan Grier and Lizz Wright alongside the Count Basie Orchestra at the Apollo Theater to celebrate the 100th Anniversary of Ella Fitzgerald.

Cosmic Adventure was selected as "Best Albums Of 2016" by Downbeat Magazine

In 2021, Tixier was featured on Jermaine Stegall's score for the sequel of Coming 2 America starring Eddie Murphy. During an interview for NBC, he describes some of the challenges he faced working on the movie in the middle of the COVID-19 pandemic.

Tixier became a naturalized U.S. citizen on 23 August 2023.

In 2026, he was commissioned by Tippet Rise Art Center and premiered at Wigmore Hall by Hilary Hahn on her international recital tour.

== Awards and honors ==
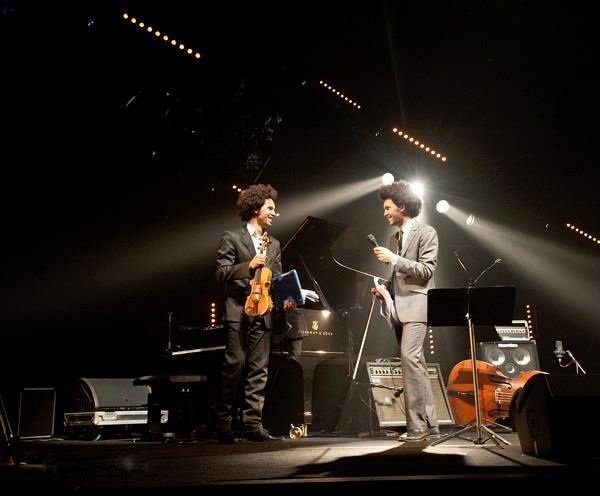
Tony Tixier and Scott Tixier opening for Herbie Hancock and Chris Dave at the festival jazz en tete

- Trophées du Sunside, 2007
- Top 50 album, Brooklyn Bazaar, Jazztimes Critics' Poll 2012
- Rising Star (violin), DownBeat Critics' Poll, 2018
- Grammy award for participation in the PJ Morton album, Gumbo Unplugged, 2018
- Grammy award for participation in John Legend A Legendary Christmas Album, 2019
- 2 Grammy awards for participation in the Lion King soundtrack, Lion King score by Hans Zimmer, 2019
- Grammy award for participation in John Legend album, Bigger Love, 2020

== Discography ==
=== Albums ===
- Brooklyn Bazaar (Sunnyside, 2011)
- Cosmic Adventure (Sunnyside, 2016)
- Bonfire (Tixland, 2025)

=== Singles ===
- Black Magic (Tixland, 2025)
- Twin Power (Tixland, 2025)
- Maze Walker (Live at Dizzy's Club New York), (Tixland, 2026)

=== Albums ===
- Like A Road Leading Home, Sofia Laiti ; James Weidman (2011)
- Tony Middleton, Session Studios Lofish (2011)
- Ephemera - Distance (Live At Lofish Studio Manhattan New York), Christian Ravaglioli (2011)
- When We Arrive, Foldersnacks, Jesse Elder (2010)
- Sangatsu, Keiichi Murata (2010) Tsumori Recordings
- Roll the Dice, Yvonnick Prene Group (2007)
- Introduicing, Yvonnick Prene Group (2006)
- Shareef Clayton, "North & South" (2015)
- Anthony Braxton, Trillium J (2014)
- John Wick Bande Originale, Evil Man Blues (The Candy Shop Boys) (2014) Lionsgate
- Keyon Harrold, The Mugician (Sony, 2017)
- Jana Herzen, Nothing but Love (Motema, 2020)
- John Legend, A Legendary Christmas (Columbia Records, 2018)
- Charnett Moffett, Bright New Day (Motema, 2019)
- Hans Zimmer, The Lion King [2019 Original Motion Picture Soundtrack] (Disney, 2019)
- Brian Tyler, Charlie's Angels (Original Motion Picture Score) (Sony Classical, 2019)
- Tony Tixier, I am Human (Whirlwind Records, 2020)
- Count Basie Orchestra, Ella 100: Live at the Apollo! (Concord, 2020)
- Ben l'Oncle Soul, Addicted to You (Blue Note, 2020)
- John Legend, Bigger Love (Columbia Records, 2020)
- Terence Blanchard, Da 5 Bloods (Original Motion Picture Score) (Sony Music, 2020)
- Brian Jackson, Milton Nascimento, Of Corners & Bridges (Selo Sesc, 2025)
- Mariah Carey, Nothing Is Impossible (Orchestral Version) (Gamma, 2026) Scott Tixier as Concertmaster
