= Todo Puede Inspirar =

Studio album by Magos Herrera
- Released: September 20, 2005 (United States); July, 2005 (Mexico)
- Recorded: 2005
- Genre: Latin jazz, Latin pop
- Length: 52:32
- Label: EMI Music

Magos Herrera chronology
Magos Herrera (2004)	Todo Puede Inspirar (2005)	Soliluna (2006)

Singles from Todo Puede Inspirar
- 1. "Todo Puede Inspirar" Released: July 2005

"Todo Puede Inspirar" (In English: Anything Can Inspire) is the fourth studio album by the Mexican Latin Jazz singer Magos Herrera.

== Background and Theme ==
Fourth studio album Magos Herrera with 8 of his themes emphasizing "Todo Puede Inspirar" and 3 subjects by artists such as The Beatles ("Norwegian Wood"), José Alfredo Jiménez ("Cuando Salga La Luna" in bossa nova version) and Edu Lobo (Pra dizer adeus). Includes a remix.

== Track listing ==
1. "Definición" (Definition)
2. "Todo Puede Inspirar" (Anything Can Inspire)
3. "Rosa" (Rose)
4. "Sol De Lisboa" (Lisboa's Sun)
5. "Azul" (Blue)
6. "Santiago" (Santiago)
7. "Norwegian Wood"
8. "Serenata" (Serenade)
9. "Blanca Pasarela" (White Gateway)
10. "Pra Dizer Adeus"
11. "Todo puede inspirar" (Remixed by Alvaro Ruiz)
