= Orquideas Susurrantes =

Studio album by Magos Herrera
- Released: February, 2000 (United States) (Mexico)
- Recorded: 1999–2000
- Genre: Latin jazz, Latin pop
- Length: 41:38
- Label: Opcion Sonica/Jm Distribuidores

Magos Herrera chronology
Coajuina (1997)	Orquideas Susurrantes (2000)	Pais Maravilla (2002)

Alternative cover
- Alternate Album Cover

Singles from Orquideas Susurrantes
- 1. "Como Un Poeta" Released: February, 2000; 2. "Orquideas Susurrantes" Released: February 2000

Orquideas Susurrantes (In English: Whispering Orchids), is the second studio album by the Latin jazz Mexican singer Magos Herrera.

== Background and theme ==
In January 2000, Herrera appeared in the compilation album, Mexican Divas II, with a special version of her hit song "Orquideas Susurrantes".

Amongst the new generation of singer-songwriters, backed by a solid based on the fusion of jazz, bossa nova and Latin rhythms, Herrera issued Orquideas Susurrantes, edited by the record label, Opcion Sonica. Since 2006, the album is now distributed by Jm Distribuidores.

== Track listing ==
1. "Como Un poeta" (As A Poet)
2. "Dennis"
3. "Xote de manha" (Xote To Awake)
4. "Son del negrito" (Negrito "Son")
5. "Maria De Verdade" (Maria Of Verdade)
6. "Una mujer" (A Woman)
7. "Orquideas Susurrantes" (Whispering Orchids)
8. "A pureza do mundo caín" (The World's Purity Is Falling Down)
9. "Sauce lloron" (Weeping Willow)
10. "Té de olvido" (A Tea To Forgive)
11. "Orquideas Susurrantes" (Whispering Orchids) (Mexican Divas Volume II Version)
