= Milestone Records discography =

The discography for Milestone Records runs from 1966 when the label was established by Orrin Keepnews and Dick Katz.

== Discography ==
=== 9000 series ===
Catalog number	Artist	Title
9001	Jones, Thad, & Adams, Pepper	Mean What You Say
9002	Solal, Martial	Solal!
9003	Merrill, Helen and Dick Katz	The Feeling is Mutual
9004	Kelly, Wynton	Full View
9005	Moody, James	Moody and the Brass Figures
9006	Bartz, Gary	Libra
9007	Vig, Tommy Orchestra	Sounds of the Seventies
9008	Henderson, Joe	The Kicker
9009	Adderley, Nat	Natural Soul
9010	Upchurch, Phil	Feeling Blue
9011	Timmons, Bobby	Got to Get It!
9012	Wofford, Mike	Summer Night
9013	Konitz, Lee	The Lee Konitz Duets
9014	Solal, Martial	On Home Ground
9015	Montgomery, Buddy	The Two-Sided Album
9016	Adderley, Nat	The Scavenger
9017	Henderson, Joe	Tetragon
9018	Bartz, Gary	Another Earth
9019	Merrill, Helen	A Shade of Difference
9020	Timmons, Bobby	Do You Know the Way?
9021	Blake, Ran	The Blue Potato and Other Outrages...
9022	DeJohnette, Jack	The DeJohnette Complex
9023	Moody, James	The Blues and Other Colors
9024	Henderson, Joe	Power To The People
9025	Konitz, Lee	Peacemeal
9026	Berger, Karl	Tune In
9027	Bartz, Gary	Home!
9028	Henderson, Joe	If You're Not Part of the Solution, You're Part of the Problem
9029	DeJohnette, Jack	Have You Heard?
9030	Adderley, Nat and Cannonball Adderley	In New Orleans
9031	Bartz, Gary	Harlem Bush Music: Taifa
9032	Bartz, Gary	Harlem Bush Music: Uhuru
9033	Bley, Paul	The Paul Bley Synthesizer Show
9034	Henderson, Joe	In Pursuit of Blackness
9035	Various	Early Modern
9036	Lytle, Johnny	The Soulful Rebel
9037	Hall, Jim	Where Would I Be?
9038	Konitz, Lee	Spirits
9039	Tyner, McCoy	Sahara
9040	Henderson, Joe	Black Is the Color
9041	Mance, Junior	That Lovin' Feelin'
9042	Rollins, Sonny	Next Album
9043	Lytle, Johnny	People & Love
9044	Tyner, McCoy	Song for My Lady
9045	Hall, Jim & Carter, Ron	Alone Together
9046	Bley, Paul	Paul Bley & Scorpio
9047	Henderson, Joe	Joe Henderson in Japan
9048	Howell, Michael	Looking Glass
9049	Tyner, McCoy	Song of the New World
9050	Henderson, Joe	Multiple
9051	Rollins, Sonny	Horn Culture
9052	Purim, Flora	Butterfly Dreams
9053	Henderson, Joe	The Elements
9054	Howell, Michael	In The Silence
9055	Tyner, McCoy	Echoes of a Friend
9056	Tyner, McCoy	Sama Layuca
9057	Henderson, Joe	Canyon Lady
9058	Purim, Flora	Stories To Tell
9059	Rollins, Sonny	The Cutting Edge
9060	Konitz, Lee	Satori
9061	De Souza, Raul	Colors
9062	Smith, Johnny "Hammond"	Gears
9063	Tyner, McCoy	Trident
9064	Rollins, Sonny	Nucleus
9065	Purim, Flora	Open Your Eyes, You Can Fly
9066	Henderson, Joe	Black Miracle
9067	Tyner, McCoy	Fly with the Wind
9068	Smith, Johnny "Hammond"	Forever Taurus
9069	Opa	Goldenwings
9070	Purim, Flora	500 Miles High at Montreux
9071	Henderson, Joe	Black Narcissus
9072	Tyner, McCoy	Focal Point
9073	Carter, Ron	Pastels
9074	Rollins, Sonny	The Way I Feel
9075	Purim, Flora	Nothing Will Be As It Was… Tomorrow
9076	Smith, Johnny "Hammond"	Storm Warning
9077	Purim, Flora	Encounter
9078	Opa	Magic Time
9079	Tyner, McCoy	Inner Voices
9080	Rollins, Sonny	Easy Living
9081	Purim, Flora	That's What She Said
9082	Carter, Ron	Peg Leg
9083	Smith, Johnny "Hammond"	Don't Let The System Get You
9084	Purim, Flora	Everyday, Every Night
9085	Tyner, McCoy	The Greeting
9086	Carter, Ron	A Song for You
9087	Tyner, McCoy	Together
9088	Carter, Ron	Parade
9089	Azymuth	Light As A Feather
9090	Rollins, Sonny	Don't Ask
9091	Tyner, McCoy	Passion Dance
9092	Carter, Ron	Pick 'Em
9093	Johnson, J.J.	Pinnacles
9094	Tyner, McCoy	Horizon
9095	Purim, Flora	Love Reborn
9096	Carter, Ron	New York Slick
9097	Azymuth	Outubro
9098	Rollins, Sonny	Love At First Sight
9099	Carter, Ron	Patrão
9100	Carter, Ron	Super Strings
9101	Azymuth	Telecommunication
9102	Tyner, McCoy	13th House
9103	Irakere	Chekere Son
9104	Rollins, Sonny	No Problem
9105	Carter, Ron	Third Plane
9106	Adderley, Cannonball	The Sextet
9107	Carter, Ron	Parfait
9108	Rollins, Sonny	Reel Life
9109	Azymuth	Cascades
9110	Montgomery, Wes	Encores
9111	Irakere	El Coco
9112	Crawford, Hank	Midnight Ramble
9113	Neptune, John Kaizan	West Of Somewhere
9114	Subramaniam, L	Spanish Wave
9115	Monk, Thelonious	Evidence
9116	McGriff, Jimmy	Countdown
9117	Bertrami, Jose Roberto	Blue Wave
9118	Azymuth	Rapid Transit
9119	Crawford, Hank	Indigo Blue
9120	Subramaniam, L	Indian Express
9121	Ponder, Jimmy	Down Here On The Ground
9122	Rollins, Sonny	Sunny Days, Starry Nights
9123	Strunz & Farah	Frontera
9124	Monk, Thelonious	Blues Five Spot
9125	Evans, Bill	More from the Vanguard
9126	McGriff, Jimmy	Skywalk
9127	Conti, Ivan	Human Factor
9128	Azymuth	Flame
9129	Crawford, Hank	Down On The Deuce
9130	Subramaniam, L	Conversations
9131	Malheiros, Alex	Atlantic Forest
9132	Ponder, Jimmy	So Many Stars
9133	Casiopea	Zoom
9134	Azymuth	Spectrum
9135	McGriff, Jimmy	State of the Art
9136	Strunz & Farah	Guitarras
9137	Rollins, Sonny	The Solo Album
9138	Subramaniam, L	Mani & Co.
9139	Prysock, Arthur	A Rockin' Good Way
9140	Crawford, Hank	Roadhouse Symphony
9141	Bertrami, Jose Roberto	Dreams Are Real
9142	Crawford, Hank & Jimmy McGriff	Soul Survivors
9143	Azymuth	Tightrope Walker
9144	Various	Round Midnight
9145	Murphy, Mark	Night Mood
9146	Prysock, Arthur	This Guy's in Love With You
9147	White, Carla	Orient Express
9148	McGriff, Jimmy	The Starting Five
9149	Crawford, Hank	Mr. Chips
9150	Rollins, Sonny	G-Man
9151	Evans, Bill	Jazzhouse
9152	Cole, Richie	Popbop
9153	Crawford, Hank & Jimmy McGriff	Steppin' Up
9154	Murphy, Mark	September Ballads
9155	Rollins, Sonny	Dancing In The Dark
9156	Azymuth	Crazy Rhythm
9157	Prysock, Arthur	Today's Love Songs, Tomorrow's Blues
9158	Roditi, Claudio	Gemini Man
9159	White, Carla	Mood Swings
9160	Azymuth	The Best of Azymuth
9161	Habian, Cliff	Tonal Paintings
9162	Cole, Richie	Signature
9163	McGriff, Jimmy	Blue to the 'Bone
9164	Evans, Bill	You're Gonna Hear from Me
9165	Earland, Charles	Front Burner
9166	Various	Bird Lives!
9167	Tyner, McCoy	Uptown/Downtown
9168	Crawford, Hank	Night Beat
9169	Azymuth	Carioca
9170	Evans, Bill	The Solo Sessions, Vol. 1
9171	Crawford, Hank and Jimmy McGriff	Soul Brothers
9172	Habian, Cliff	Manhattan Bridge
9173	Handy, John	Centerpiece
9174	Earland, Charles	Third Degree Burn
9175	Roditi, Claudio	Slow Fire
9176	Smith, Jimmy	Prime Time
9177	Crawford, Hank & Jimmy McGriff	On the Blue Side
9178	Doky, Niels Lan	Dreams
9179	Rollins, Sonny	Falling in Love with Jazz
9180	Crawford, Hank & Cole, Richie	Bossa International
9181	Tyner, McCoy and Stephane Grappelli	One on One
9182	Crawford, Hank	Groove Master
9183	Doky, Niels Lan	Friendship
9184	Smith, Jimmy	Fourmost
9185	Evans, Bill	Blue in Green: The Concert in Canada
9186	Easley, Bill	First Call
9187	Redd, Freddie	Everybody Loves a Winner
9188	Newman, David	Back To Basics
9189	Hyman, Dick	Stride Piano Summit
9190	Donaldson, Lou	Play the Right Thing
9191	Baker, Chet	Out of Nowhere
9192	Crawford, Hank	Portrait
9193	Tate, Grady	Grady Tate Sings
9194	Rollins, Sonny	Here's to the People
9195	Evans, Bill	The Solo Sessions, Vol. 2
9196	Woods, Phil	Full House
9197	Jordan, Clifford	Down Through the Years
9198	Donaldson, Lou	Birdseed
9199	Monk, Thelonious	San Francisco Holiday
9200	Evans, Bill	Loose Blues
9201	Crawford, Hank	South Central
9202	Bonfá, Luiz	The Bonfa Magic
9203	Moura, Paulo & Raphael Rebello	Dois Irmaos
9204	Luiz, Nonato	Gosto De Brasil
9205	Tomatito	Barrio Negro
9206	Pardo, Jorge	Las Cigarras Son Quiza Sordas
9207	Smith, Jimmy	Sum Serious Blues
9208	Tate, Grady	Body And Soul
9209	Puebla, Carlos	La Bodeguita Del Medio
9210	Santamaria, Mongo	Mongo Introduces La Lupe
9211	Various	Christmas Songs
9212	Powell, Baden	Seresta Brasileira
9213	Pereira, Marco & Cristovao Bastos	Bons Encontros
9214	Luiz, Nonato & Tulio Mourao	Carioca
9215	Rollins, Sonny	Old Flames
9216	Riverside Reunion Band	Mostly Monk
9217	Donaldson, Lou	Caracas
9218	Cuber, Ronnie	The Scene Is Clean
9219	Holloway, Ron	Slanted
9220	Silva, Robertinho	Speak No Evil
9221	Rebello, Raphael & Dino Sète Cordas	Rio Nights
9222	Hora, Rildo	Espraiado
9223	Pardo, Jorge	Veloz
9224	Goldschmidt, Per	Frankly
9225	Gonzalez, Jerry	Crossroads
9226	Oquendo, Manny	Mejor Que Nunca
9227	Ross, Billy	The Sound
9228	Riverside Reunion Band	Hi-Fly
9229	Pardo, Jorge & Chano Dominguez	10 de Paco
9230	Da Paraiba, Canhoto	Walking On Coals
9231	Leitte, Dirceu	Leitte De Coco
9232	Mario, Francisco	Retratos
9233	Jackson, Duffy	Swing! Swing! Swing!
9234	Berrios, Steve	First World
9235	Evans, Bill	On Green Dolphin Street
9236	Campbell, Gary	Intersection
9237	Afro Blue Band	Impressions
9238	Holloway, Ron	Struttin'
9239	O'Farrill, Chico	Pure Emotion
9240	Henderson, Eddie	Inspiration
9241	Silva, Robertinho	Shot On Goal
9242	Gonzalez, Jerry	Pensativo
9243	Locke, Joe	Moment To Moment
9244	Tyner, McCoy	Prelude and Sonata
9245	Santamaria, Mongo	Mongo Returns
9246	Mauro, Turk	Hittin' The Jug
9247	Pucho and His Latin Soul Brothers	Rip A Dip
9248	Mraz, George	Jazz
9249	Evans, Bill & Stan Getz	But Beautiful
9250	Rollins, Sonny	Sonny Rollins + 3
9251	Smith, Jimmy & Eddie Harris	All The Way Live
9252	Montgomery, Wes	Encores Vol. 1: Body And Soul
9253	Dalto, Adela	Papa Boco
9254	Henderson, Eddie	Dark Shadows
9255	Berrios, Steve	And Then Some!
9256	Keystone Trio (John Hicks, George Mraz, Idris Muhammad)	Heart Beats
9257	Holloway, Ron	Scorcher
9258	Gonzalez, Jerry	And The Fort Apache Band
9259	Crawford, Hank	Tight
9260	Estrada Brothers, The	Get Out Of My Way
9261	Montgomery, Wes	Encores Vol. 2: Blue 'n Boogie
9262	Mraz, George	My Foolish Heart
9263	Oquendo, Manny	On the Move (Muevete!)
9264	Henderson, Eddie	Dream Session - The All Stars Play Miles Davis
9265	Woods, Phil	Alto Summit
9266	Anderson, Clifton	Landmarks
9267	Mauro, Turk	The Truth
9268	McGriff, Jimmy	The Dream Team
9269	Pedersen, Niels	Friends Forever
9270	Keystone Trio (John Hicks, George Mraz, Idris Muhammad)	Newklear Music
9271	Locke, Joe	Sound Tracks
9272	Mraz, George	Bottom Lines
9273	Shank, Bud	By Request: Bud Shank Meets the Rhythm Section
9274	Crawford, Hank & Jimmy McGriff	Road Tested
9275	Adderley, Cannonball	Greatest Hits
9276	Holloway, Ron	Groove Update
9277	Pardo, Jorge	In a Minute
9278	Golson, Benny	Remembering Clifford
9279	Crawford, Hank	After Dark
9280	Rollins, Sonny	Global Warming
9281	Pata Negra	Best of Pata Negra
9282	Evans, Bill	Half Moon Bay
9283	Alexander, Eric	Solid!
9284	Locke, Joe	Slander (And Other Love Songs)
9285	McGriff, Jimmy	Straight Up
9286	Soloff, Lew	Trumpet Legacy
9287	Crawford, Hank & Jimmy McGriff	Crunch Time
9288	Oquendo, Manny and Libre	Ahora
9289	Drew, Kenny Jr.	Winter Flower
9290	Soloff, Lou	With A Song In My Heart
9291	Evans, Bill	Homecoming
9292	Mraz, George	Duke's Place
9293	Alexander, Eric	Man with a Horn
9294	O'Farrill, Chico	Blood Lines
9295	Yamada, Joh	Bluestone
9296	Duran, Mad & Eddie	From Here to the Moon
9297	Ian Shaw & Cedar Walton	In a New York Minute
9298	Montgomery, Wes	Dangerous
9299	O'Farrill, Chico	Heart of a Legend
9300	McGriff, Jimmy	McGriff's House Party
9301	Koorax, Ithamara	Serenade in Blue
9302	Alexander, Eric	The First Milestone
9303	Prysock, Arthur	The Best of Arthur Prysock
9304	Crawford, Hank	The World of Hank Crawford
9305	Scott, Jimmy	Mood Indigo
9306	Taylor, Martin	In Concert
9307	Oquendo, Manny and Libre	Los New Yorkiños!
9308	O'Farrill, Chico	Carambola
9309	Mraz, George	Morava
9310	Rollins, Sonny	This Is What I Do
9311	Smith, Jimmy	Fourmost Return
9312	Matthews, David and the Manhattan Jazz Orchestra	Bach 2000
9313	McGriff, Jimmy	Feelin' It
9314	Scott, Jimmy	Over the Rainbow
9315	Alexander, Eric	The Second Milestone
9316	Shaw, Ian	Soho Stories
9317	Evans, Bill	Tenderly: An Informal Session
9318	Crawford, Hank and Jimmy McGriff	The Best of Hank Crawford and Jimmy McGriff
9319	Holloway, Red and Plas Johnson	Keep That Groove Going!
9320	Matthews, David and the Manhattan Jazz Orchestra	Hey Duke!
9321	Scott, Jimmy	But Beautiful
9322	Alexander, Eric	Summit Meeting
9323	Brazil All Stars	Rio Strut
9324	Vinson, Eddie "Cleanhead" and Cannonball Adderley	Cleanhead and Cannonball
9325	McGriff, Jimmy	McGriff Avenue
9326	Snidero, Jim	Strings
9327	Koorax, Ithamara	Love Dance: The Ballad Album
9328	Ellis, Dave	State of Mind
9329	Konitz, Lee and Alan Broadbent	Live-Lee
9330	Alexander, Eric	Nightlife in Tokyo
9331	Rodriguez, Willie Jazz Quartet	Flatjacks
9332	Scott, Jimmy	Moon Glow
9333	Amador, Diego	Piano Jondo
9334	Cobb, Jimmy	Cobb's Groove
9335	Holloway, Red	Coast to Coast
9336	Evans, Bill	Getting Sentimental
9337	Various artists	Festival in Havana
9338	Konitz, Lee and Alan Broadbent	More Live-Lee
9339	Tyner, McCoy	Counterpoints
9340	Pucho and His Latin Soul Brothers	The Hideout
9341	Sindero, Jim	Close Up
9342	Rollins, Sonny	Without a Song: The 9/11 Concert

=== 2000 series ===
The Milestone 2000 Series reissued historical jazz and blues recordings including those of Jelly Roll Morton and King Oliver that were originally released in the 1920s on Gennett Records and Ma Rainey and Blind Lemon Jefferson that were originally released on Paramount Records.

#	Artist	Title
1	Ma Rainey	The Immortal Ma Rainey
2	Johnny Dodds	The Immortal Johnny Dodds
3	Jelly Roll Morton	The Immortal Jelly Roll Morton
4	Blind Lemon Jefferson	The Immortal Blind Lemon Jefferson
5	Fletcher Henderson	The Immortal Fletcher Henderson
6	King Oliver	The Immortal King Oliver
7	Blind Lemon Jefferson	Volume Two
8	Ma Rainey	Blame It On The Blues
9	Various Artists	Boogie Woogie Rarities 1927–1932
10	Louis Armstrong	An Early Portrait
11	Johnny Dodds	Chicago Mess Around
12	Earl Hines	Monday Date 1928
13	Blind Lemon Jefferson	Black Snake Moan
14	Freddie Keppard/Tommy Ladnier	New Orleans Horns
15	Ida Cox	Blues Ain't Nothin' Else But…
16	Big Bill Broonzy, King Solomon Hill, Bumble Bee Slim, Willie Brown, Blind Roosevelt Graves, Blind Lemon Jefferson, Bobby Grant, Buddy Boy Hawkins	The Blues Tradition 1927–1932
17	Ma Rainey	Down In The Basement
18	Various Artists	Pitchin' Boogie
