= Outline of jazz =

Musical style and genre

Jazz
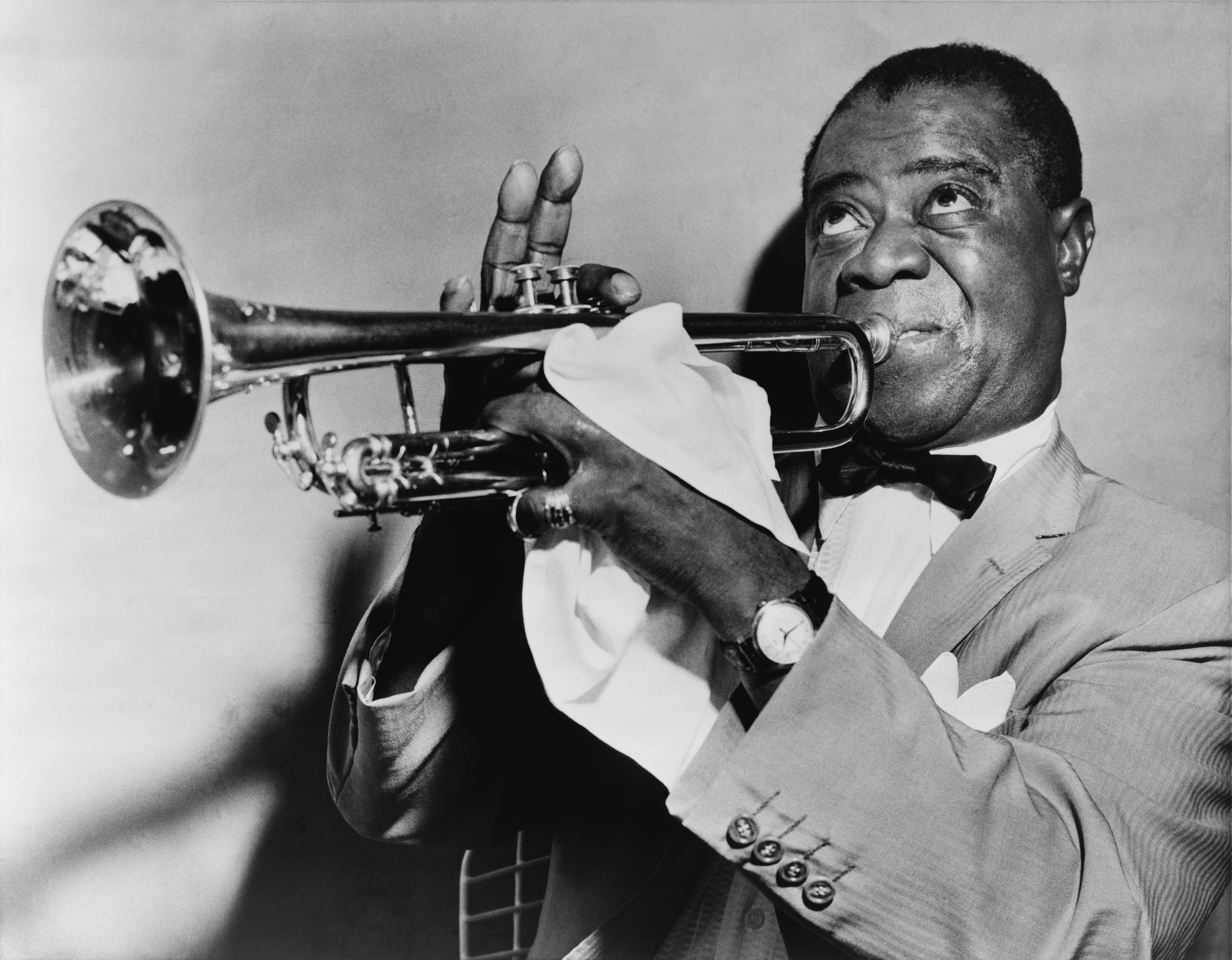
- Louis Armstrong (1901–1971) is considered one of the pivotal musicians in jazz for his contributions as a trumpet player, composer and singer.
- Stylistic origins: Blues; folk; marches; ragtime; classical music
- Cultural origins: Late 19th-century United States
- Typical instruments: Double bass; drums; guitar (typically electric guitar); piano; saxophone; trumpet; clarinet; trombone; vocals; vibraphone; Hammond organ; harmonica. In jazz fusion of the 1970s, electric bass, electric piano and synthesizer were common.
- Derivative forms: Funk; jump blues; reggae; rhythm and blues; ska; hip hop

Subgenres
- Avant-garde jazz; Bebop; Big band; Chamber jazz; Cool jazz; Free jazz; Gypsy jazz; Hard bop; Latin jazz; Mainstream jazz; Modal jazz; M-Base; Neo-bop; Post-bop; Soul jazz; Swing; Third stream; Traditional jazz (complete list)

Fusion genres
- Acid jazz; Afrobeat; Bluegrass; Dansband; Folk jazz; Free funk; Humppa; Indo jazz; Jam band; Jazzcore; Jazz funk; Jazz fusion; Jazz rap; Kwela; Mambo; Manila Sound; Nu jazz; Nu soul; Punk jazz; Shibuya-kei; Ska jazz; Smooth jazz; Swing revival; World fusion

Regional scenes
- Australia; Azerbaijan; Brazil; Canada; Cuba; France; Germany; Haiti; India; Italy; Japan; Malawi; Netherlands; Poland; South Africa; Spain; United Kingdom

Other topics
- Jazz clubs; Jazz standard; Jazz (word)

The following outline is provided as an overview of and a topical guide to jazz:

Jazz – a musical style that originated at the beginning of the 20th century in African American communities in the Southern United States, mixing African music and European classical music traditions.

Jazz is a music genre that originated from African American communities of New Orleans in the United States during the late 19th and early 20th centuries. It emerged in the form of independent traditional and popular musical styles, all linked by the common bonds of African American and European American musical parentage with a performance orientation.

Jazz spans a period of over a hundred years, encompassing a very wide range of music, making it difficult to define. Jazz makes heavy use of improvisation, polyrhythms, syncopation and the swing note, as well as aspects of European harmony, American popular music, the brass band tradition, and African musical elements such as blue notes and African-American styles such as ragtime.

Although the foundation of jazz is deeply rooted within the black experience of the United States, different cultures have contributed their own experience and styles to the art form as well. Intellectuals around the world have hailed jazz as "one of America's original art forms".

As jazz spread around the world, it drew on different national, regional, and local musical cultures, which gave rise to many distinctive styles. New Orleans jazz began in the early 1910s, combining earlier brass-band marches, French quadrilles, biguine, ragtime and blues with collective polyphonic improvisation.

In the 1930s, heavily arranged dance-oriented swing big bands, Kansas City jazz, a hard-swinging, bluesy, improvisational style and Gypsy jazz (a style that emphasized musette waltzes) were the prominent styles. Bebop emerged in the 1940s, shifting jazz from danceable popular music towards a more challenging "musician's music" which was played at faster tempos and used more chord-based improvisation. Cool jazz developed in the end of the 1940s, introducing calmer, smoother sounds and long, linear melodic lines.

The 1950s saw the emergence of free jazz, which explored playing without regular meter, beat and formal structures, and in the mid-1950s, hard bop emerged, which introduced influences from rhythm and blues, gospel, and blues, especially in the saxophone and piano playing. Modal jazz developed in the late 1950s, using the mode, or musical scale, as the basis of musical structure and improvisation.

Jazz-rock fusion appeared in the late 1960s and early 1970s, combining jazz improvisation with rock music's rhythms, electric instruments and highly amplified stage sound. In the early 1980s, a commercial form of jazz fusion called smooth jazz became successful, garnering significant radio airplay. Other styles and genres abound in the 2000s, such as Latin and Afro-Cuban jazz.

== Types of jazz ==
Jazz can be described as all of the following:

- Music – art and cultural form whose medium is sound and silence. Its common elements are pitch (which governs melody and harmony), rhythm (and its associated concepts tempo, meter, and articulation), dynamics, and the sonic qualities of timbre and texture. The word derives from Greek μουσική (mousike; "art of the Muses").
  - Music genre – conventional category that identifies pieces of music as belonging to a shared tradition or set of conventions. It is to be distinguished from musical form and musical style, although in practice these terms are sometimes used interchangeably.

=== Musical instruments typically associated with jazz ===
Rhythm section instruments

- Jazz bass
- Jazz drumming
- Jazz guitar
- Jazz piano

"Lead instruments and lead vocals"

- Saxophone
- Trombone
- Trumpet
- Jazz violin
- Vibraphone
- Vocal jazz

Other

- Banjo (early Dixieland jazz)
- Bass guitar (post 1950s, especially post-1970s)
- Clarinet (early Dixieland jazz and Swing-era jazz)
- Tuba (early Dixieland jazz)

== Jazz genres ==
- Avant-garde jazz
- Bebop
- Big band
- Chamber jazz
- Continental Jazz
- Cool jazz
- Dixieland or 'Early Jazz'.
- Free jazz
- Gypsy jazz
- Hard Bop
- Latin jazz
- Mainstream jazz
- M-Base
- Neo-bop
- Orchestral jazz
- Post-bop
- Soul jazz
- Spiritual jazz
- Stride
- Swing
- Third stream
- Traditional jazz
- Traditional pop
- Vocal jazz

=== Jazz fusion ===
Jazz fusion

- Acid jazz
- Afrobeat
- Bluegrass
- Bossa nova
- Dansband
- Free funk
- Humppa
- Jam band
- Jazzcore
- Jazz funk
- Jazz fusion
- Jazz rap
- Kwela
- Livetronica
- Mambo
- Manila Sound
- Nu jazz
- Nu soul
- Punk jazz
- Shibuya-kei
- Ska jazz
- Smooth jazz
- Swing revival
- World fusion

=== Regional scenes ===
- Australian jazz
- Azerbaijani jazz
- Bossa nova
- British jazz
- Cuban jazz
- Dutch jazz
- French jazz
- Indo jazz
- Italian jazz
- Japanese jazz
- Jazz in Germany
- Music of Malawi
- Polish jazz
- South African jazz
- Spanish jazz

==== Local scenes ====
- Cape jazz
- Kansas City jazz
- Dixieland
- West Coast jazz

== Jazz compositions ==
=== Jazz standards ===
- Jazz standard – musical composition which is an important part of the musical repertoire of jazz musicians, in that it is widely known, performed, and recorded by jazz musicians, and widely known by listeners. Jazz standards include jazz arrangements of popular Broadway songs, blues songs and well-known jazz tunes.
  - List of pre-1920 jazz standards
  - List of 1920s jazz standards
  - List of 1930s jazz standards
  - List of 1940s jazz standards
  - List of post-1950 jazz standards

=== Jazz discographies ===
- Blue Note Records discography
- BYG Actuel
- Cobblestone Records
- CTI Records
- ECM
- ESP-Disk
- Flying Dutchman Records
- Freedom Records
- Groove Merchant
- Impulse! Records discography
- India Navigation
- Landmark Records
- Mainstream Records
- Milestone Records discography
- MPS Records discography
- Muse Records discography
- Prestige Records discography
- Riverside Records discography
- Strata-East Records
- Verve Records discography

== History of jazz ==
- Timeline of jazz education

=== Stylistic origins ===
- Blues
- Folk
- March
- Ragtime

=== Cultural origins ===
- Early 1910s New Orleans

=== Mainstream popularity ===
- 1920s–1960s, although popularity and development as a genre persists into the present.

=== Derivatives ===
- Jump blues
- Rhythm and blues
- Rock and roll
- Ska
- Reggae
- Funk

=== Years in jazz ===
- Pre-1920
  - 1915 • 1916 • 1917 • 1918 • 1919
- 1920s
  - 1920 • 1921 • 1922 • 1923 • 1924 • 1925 • 1926 • 1927 • 1928 • 1929
- 1930s
  - 1930 • 1931 • 1932 • 1933 • 1934 • 1935 • 1936 • 1937 • 1938 • 1939
- 1940s
  - 1940 • 1941 • 1942 • 1943 • 1944 • 1945 • 1946 • 1947 • 1948 • 1949
- 1950s
  - 1950 • 1951 • 1952 • 1953 • 1954 • 1955 • 1956 • 1957 • 1958 • 1959
- 1960s
  - 1960 • 1961 • 1962 • 1963 • 1964 • 1965 • 1966 • 1967 • 1968 • 1969
- 1970s
  - 1970 • 1971 • 1972 • 1973 • 1974 • 1975 • 1976 • 1977 • 1978 • 1979
- 1980s
  - 1980 • 1981 • 1982 • 1983 • 1984 • 1985 • 1986 • 1987 • 1988 • 1989
- 1990s
  - 1990 • 1991 • 1992 • 1993 • 1994 • 1995 • 1996 • 1997 • 1998 • 1999
- 2000s
  - 2000 • 2001 • 2002 • 2003 • 2004 • 2005 • 2006 • 2007 • 2008 • 2009
- 2010s
  - 2010 • 2011 • 2012 • 2013 • 2014 • 2015 • 2016 • 2017 • 2018 • 2019
- 2020s
  - 2020 • 2021 • 2022 • 2023 • 2024 • 2025 • 2026 • 2027 • 2028 • 2029

== Jazz culture ==
- Big band
- Improvisation
- Jam session
- Jazz Age
- Jazz band
- Jazz poetry
- Jazz royalty
- Jazz (word)
- List of jazz clubs
- List of jazz contrafacts
- List of jazz festivals
- Scat singing
- Stride
- Swing performance

== Jazz organizations ==
- List of jazz institutions and organizations

== Jazz publications ==
- JazzTimes
- Down Beat
- Jazz Review
- Jazz Improv
- All About Jazz

== Persons influential in jazz ==
=== Jazz musicians ===
- List of jazz musicians

==== Jazz musicians, by instrument ====
- List of jazz bassists
- List of jazz clarinetists
- List of jazz drummers
  - List of American jazz drummers
- List of jazz guitarists
- List of jazz organists
- List of jazz percussionists
- List of jazz pianists
- List of jazz saxophonists
- List of jazz trombonists
- List of jazz trumpeters
- List of jazz violinists
- List of jazz vocalists

==== Jazz musicians, by genre ====
- List of bebop musicians
- List of chamber jazz musicians
- List of cool jazz and West Coast jazz musicians
- List of hard bop musicians
- List of jazz fusion musicians
- List of scat singers
- List of ska-jazz musicians
- List of smooth jazz musicians
- List of soul-jazz musicians
- List of swing musicians

== See also ==
- Glossary of jazz and popular musical terms
- Outline of music
- Victorian Jazz Archive
