= South Central (album) =

Studio album by Hank Crawford
- Released: 1993
- Recorded: August 1992
- Genre: Jazz
- Label: Milestone
- Producer: Bob Porter

Hank Crawford chronology
Portrait (1991)	South Central (1993)	Right Turn on Blues (1994)

South Central is an album by the American saxophonist Hank Crawford, released in 1993. He supported it with a North American tour.

== Production ==
Recorded in August 1992, the album was produced by Bob Porter. Crawford was back by Melvin Sparks on guitar, Grady Tate on drums, Peter Marin Weiss on bass, and Stan Hope on piano. Bernard Purdie, Gloria Coleman, and Dr. John contributed to a couple of the tracks. The album was recorded after the 1992 Los Angeles riots; Crawford was inspired by the resiliency of the region and his hope for its future. "In a Mellotone" is a version of the Duke Ellington standard.

== Critical reception ==
Professional ratings
Review scores
Source	Rating
All Music Guide to Jazz	3/5 stars
Detroit Free Press	4/4 stars
MusicHound Jazz: The Essential Album Guide	3.5/5 stars
The Penguin Guide to Jazz Recordings	3/4 stars
The Rolling Stone Jazz & Blues Album Guide	3.5/5 stars
The Virgin Encyclopedia of Popular Music	3/5 stars

The Detroit Free Press praised the "good songs in a good mix, sharp arrangements and a stellar cast of players to bring it all off." The Omaha World-Herald called the album "raw, elemental and mostly funky". The Commercial Appeal said that "Crawford's playing is a down-home delight."

== Track listing ==
No.	Title	Length
1.	"Falling in Love with Love"
2.	"I Should Care"
3.	"South Central"
4.	"I Want to Talk About You"
5.	"In a Mellotone"
6.	"Conjunction Mars"
7.	"Fool That I Am"
8.	"Splanky"
9.	"O Holy Night"
