= Van Gelder Studio =

American jazz recording studio

- U.S. National Register of Historic Places
- New Jersey Register of Historic Places
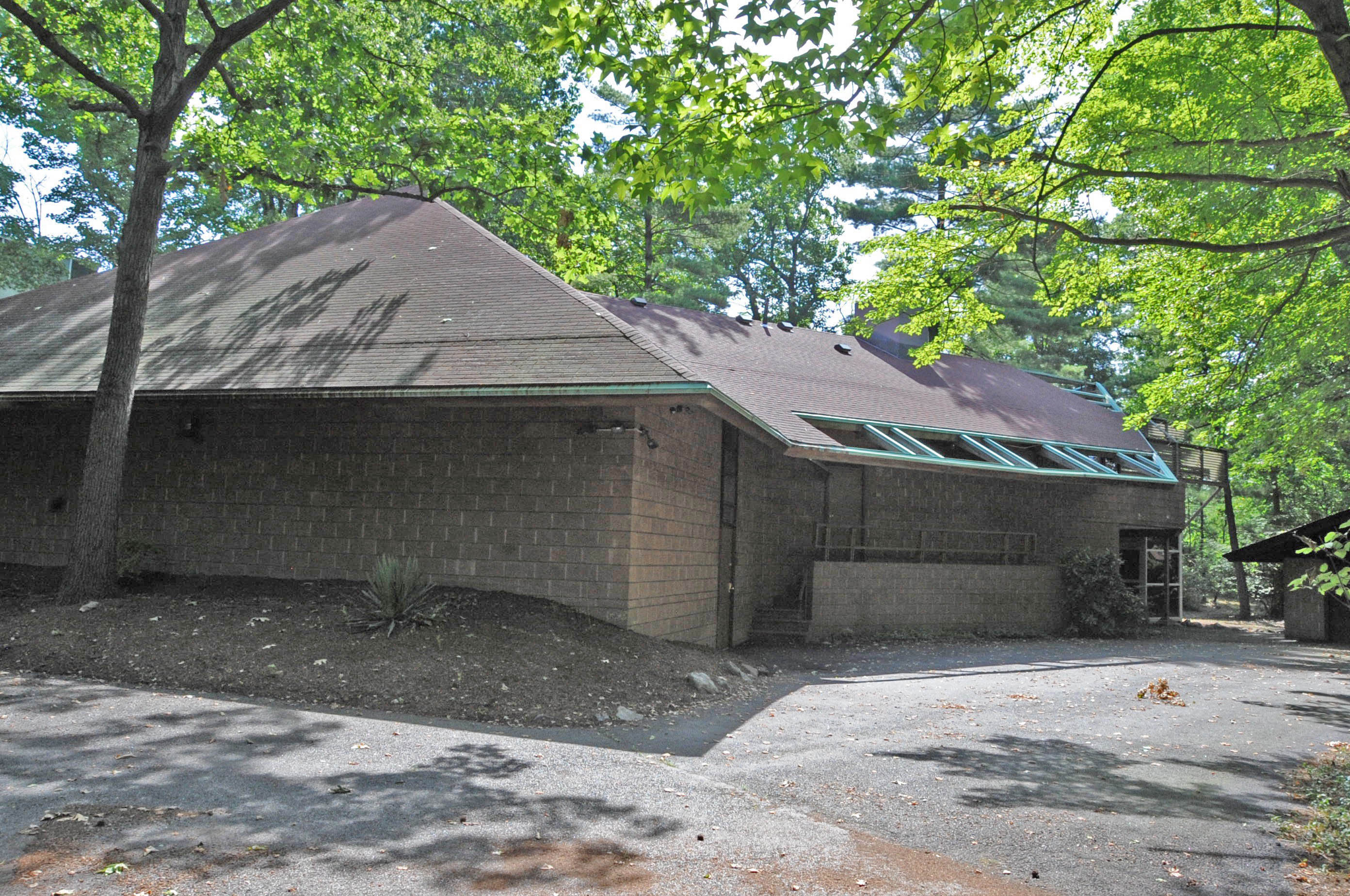
- Van Gelder Studio in 2022

- Location within Bergen County, New Jersey Location within New Jersey Location within the United States
- Location: 445 Sylvan Avenue; Englewood Cliffs, New Jersey
- Coordinates: 40°52′34″N 73°57′7″W
- NRHP reference No.: 100007644
- NJRHP No.: 5626

Significant dates
- Added to NRHP: April 25, 2022
- Designated NJRHP: March 10, 2022

The Van Gelder Studio is a recording studio at 445 Sylvan Avenue, Englewood Cliffs, New Jersey, United States. Following the use of his parents' home at 25 Prospect Avenue, Hackensack, New Jersey, for the original studio, Rudy Van Gelder (1924–2016) moved to the new location for his recording studio in July 1959. It has been used to record many albums released by jazz labels such as Blue Note, Prestige, Impulse!, Verve, and CTI. It was added to the National Register of Historic Places on April 25, 2022, for its significance in performing arts and engineering.

== Background ==
From around 1952, beginning with a session led by Gil Melle that was sold to Blue Note, recordings were made by Van Gelder for commercial release in the living room of his parents' house at 25 Prospect Avenue in Hackensack, a house that had been built with the intention of doubling as a recording studio. The area was later subsumed by the Hackensack University Medical Center.

In July 1959, Van Gelder moved to a new facility in Englewood Cliffs. The last recording session at Hackensack and the first at Englewood Cliffs were both led by Ike Quebec and are contained in From Hackensack to Englewood Cliffs, a collection of singles recorded by the saxophonist in July 1959.

Important recordings made at Hackensack include Thelonious Monk's Thelonious Monk Plays Duke Ellington (1955), Sonny Rollins' Saxophone Colossus (1956) and Tenor Madness(1956) ; Miles Davis' Workin' and Steamin' (1956); Jazz Messengers recordings like Moanin' (1958); solo debuts by Hank Mobley (Hank Mobley Quartet, 1955) and Johnny Griffin (Introducing Johnny Griffin, 1956).

Van Gelder's recording techniques were closely guarded, to the extent that microphones were moved when photography of bands was taking place in order to disguise his means of recording.

The new structure with a 39-foot ceiling and fine acoustics, designed by the architect David Henken and inspired by the work of Frank Lloyd Wright, resembles a chapel. The critic Ira Gitler describes the studio in liner notes for the saxophonist Booker Ervin's The Space Book (1964): "In the high-domed, wooden-beamed, brick-tiled, spare modernity of Rudy Van Gelder's studio, one can get a feeling akin to religion."

Among many significant recordings made at Englewood Cliffs are John Coltrane's A Love Supreme (1964), Booker Ervin's The Space Book, 1964 Sonny Rollins' Sonny Rollins on Impulse! (1965), Stanley Turrentine's Cherry (1972) and Don't Mess with Mister T (1973), Andrew Hill's Point of Departure (1964), Freddie Hubbard's Red Clay (1970) and Hank Mobley's Soul Station (1960).

In 2016, when Van Gelder died, the studio was entrusted to Maureen Sickler, who now operates and co-owns Van Gelder Studio with her husband, Don Sickler.

For its significance in the history of jazz music, the Van Gelder Studio was entered in to the National Register of Historic Places on April 25, 2022.

== List of recording sessions ==
The following table lists recording sessions for albums held at the studio.

=== 1970s ===
Recording Date	Album	Artist	Label
1970	Portrait of Jenny	Dizzy Gillespie	Perception
January 2, 1970	Drives	Lonnie Smith	Blue Note
January 9, 1970	Everything I Play Is Funky	Lou Donaldson	Blue Note
January 12, 1970	Dateline	Pucho & the Latin Soul Brothers	Prestige
January 16, 1970 & January 23, 1970	Mosaic Select 16: Andrew Hill	Andrew Hill	Blue Note
January 26, 1970	Greasy Kid Stuff!	Harold Mabern	Prestige
January 27, 1970 & January 28 and 29, 1970	Red Clay	Freddie Hubbard	CTI
January 30, 1970	Green Is Beautiful	Grant Green	Blue Note
February 2, 1970	Night Lights	Gene Ammons	Prestige
February 9, 1970	Extensions	McCoy Tyner	Blue Note
February 13, 1970 & April 10, 1970	It Could Only Happen with You	Duke Pearson	Blue Note
February 16, 1970	Right On Brother	Boogaloo Joe Jones	Prestige
February 23, 1970	Truth!	Houston Person	Prestige
March 6, 1970 & March 13, 1970	Lift Every Voice	Andrew Hill	Blue Note
March 16, 1970, April 23, 24 and 29, 1970 & May 8, 20 and 22, 1970	Stone Flower	Antônio Carlos Jobim	CTI
March 16, 1970, April 23, 24 and 29, 1970 & May 8, 20 and 22, 1970	Tide	Antônio Carlos Jobim	A&M
March 18, 1970	Black Magic!	Sonny Phillips	Prestige
March 25, 1970, March 26, 1970 & May 12, 1970	Gula Matari	Quincy Jones	A&M
April 6, 1970	Afro-Disiac	Charles Kynard	Prestige
April 8, 1970 & June 18, 1970	That Healin' Feelin'	Horace Silver	Blue Note
April 27, 1970 & June 29, 1970	Yesterday, Today & Tomorrow	Billy Butler	Prestige
May 15, 1970	Electric Byrd	Donald Byrd	Blue Note
June 1, 1970	Black Drops	Charles Earland	Prestige
June 15, 1970	Soul Liberation	Rusty Bryant	Prestige
July 1, 1970 & July 2, 1970	Joe Farrell Quartet	Joe Farrell	CTI
July 16, 1970 & July 22, 1970	Black Out	Fats Theus	CTI
July 17, 1970	Coalition	Elvin Jones	Blue Note
July 21, 1970	Cosmos	McCoy Tyner	Blue Note
July 27, 1970	Black on Black!	Sonny Phillips	Prestige
July 31, 1970	Thinking of Home	Hank Mobley	Blue Note
September 10, 1970	Asante	McCoy Tyner	Blue Note
September 14, 1970	Sparks!	Melvin Sparks	Prestige
September 18, 1970 & September 25, 1970	A Groovy Situation	Reuben Wilson	Blue Note
September 21, 1970	Here It 'Tis	Johnny "Hammond" Smith	Prestige
October 12, 1970	Person to Person!	Houston Person	Prestige
November 1970	Sugar	Stanley Turrentine	CTI
November 2, 1970	Black Rhythm Revolution!	Idris Muhammad	Prestige
November 11, 1970	The Black Cat!	Gene Ammons	Prestige
November 15, 1970 & January 29, 1971	Total Response	Horace Silver	Blue Note
November 16, 1970	Straight Life	Freddie Hubbard	CTI
November 23, 1970	No Way!	Boogaloo Joe Jones	Prestige
December 1, 1970 & December 11, 1970	Afro-Classic	Hubert Laws	CTI
December 7, 1970	Sneak Preview!	Leon Spencer Jr.	Prestige
December 14, 1970	Wa-Tu-Wa-Zui (Beautiful People)	Charles Kynard	Prestige
December 21, 1970	Night Life	Billy Butler	Prestige
1971	He's Coming	Roy Ayers Ubiquity	Polydor
1971	Funk, Inc.	Funk, Inc.	Prestige
January 4, 1971	Turn It On!	Sonny Stitt	Prestige
January 11, 1971	Purdie Good!	Bernard Purdie	Prestige
January 13, 1971, February 1 and 4, March 19 & April 6, 1971	Gilberto with Turrentine	Astrud Gilberto and Stanley Turrentine	CTI
February 1971, March 9, 1971 & April 23, 1971	The Sugar Man	Stanley Turrentine	CTI
February 2, 1971 & February 3, 1971	Beyond the Blue Horizon	George Benson	CTI
February 8, 1971	You Talk That Talk!	Gene Ammons and Sonny Stitt	Prestige
February 12, 1971	Genesis	Elvin Jones	Blue Note
February 12, 1971 & December 16, 1971	Merry-Go-Round	Elvin Jones	Blue Note
February 22, 1971	Fire Eater	Rusty Bryant	Prestige
March 1, 1971 & March 8, 1971	Spark Plug	Melvin Sparks	Prestige
April 3, 1971 and May 3, 1971	Soul Story	Charles Earland	Prestige
April 8, 1971 & April 9, 1971	Houston Express	Houston Person	Prestige
April 12, 1971	What's Going On	Johnny "Hammond" Smith	Prestige
April 23, 1971 & July 7 and 13, 1971	Salt Song	Stanley Turrentine	CTI
April 28, 1971 & May 11 and 25, 1971	God Bless the Child	Kenny Burrell	CTI
May 17, 1971	Things Have Got to Change	Archie Shepp	Impulse!
May 21, 1971	Visions	Grant Green	Blue Note
June 3, 1971 & June 4, 1971	Breakout	Johnny Hammond	Kudu
June 8, 1971 & June 10 and 25, 1971	The Rite of Spring	Hubert Laws	CTI
July 7, 1971	Louisiana Slim	Leon Spencer	Prestige
July 9, 1971	Black Vibrations	Sonny Stitt	Prestige
July 14, 1971 & July 15, 1971	Mama Wailer	Lonnie Smith	CTI
July 16, 1971	Cosmos	Lou Donaldson	Blue Note
July 23, 1971	Set Us Free	Reuben Wilson	Blue Note
July 26, 1971	My Way	Gene Ammons	Prestige
August 1971	Gatorade	Willis Jackson	Prestige
August 16, 1971	What It Is	Boogaloo Joe Jones	Prestige
September 1971	Inner City Blues	Grover Washington Jr.	Kudu
September 13, 1971 & September 20, 1971	Peace and Rhythm	Idris Muhammad	Prestige
September 14, 1971, September 15, 1971 & September 16, 1971	First Light	Freddie Hubbard	CTI
September 17, 1971 & September 18, 1971	Lee Morgan: The Last Session	Lee Morgan	Blue Note
September 30, 1971 & October 1, 1971	Flute-In	Bobbi Humphrey	Blue Note
October 4, 1971	Wild Fire	Rusty Bryant	Prestige
October 11, 1971	Shaft	Bernard Purdie	Prestige
October 1971 & November, 1971	Wild Horses Rock Steady	Johnny Hammond	Kudu
November 1971	White Rabbit	George Benson	CTI
November 4, 1971	Outback	Joe Farrell	CTI
December 1971	From a Whisper to a Scream	Esther Phillips	Kudu
December 8, 1971	Village of the Pharoahs	Pharoah Sanders	Impulse!
December 16, 1971 & December 17, 1971	Shades of Green (horn overdubs)	Grant Green	Blue Note
January 1972	Help Me Make It Through the Night	Hank Crawford	Kudu
January 17, 1972 & February 14, 1972	All	Horace Silver	Blue Note
January 20, 1972 & January 21, 1972	Two Headed Freap	Ronnie Foster	Blue Note
February 14, 1972 & February 21, 1972	Akilah!	Melvin Sparks	Prestige
February 15, 1972	Goin' Down Slow	Sonny Stitt	Prestige
February 16, 1972 & February 17, 1972	Intensity	Charles Earland	Prestige
February 16, 1972, February 17, 1972 & February 14, 1973	Charles III	Charles Earland	Prestige
February 17, 1972	Hollow Out	Elvin Jones and Masabumi Kikuchi	Philips
February 22, 1972	Bad Walking Woman	Leon Spencer	Prestige
February 22, 1972 & January 26, 1973	Where I'm Coming From	Leon Spencer	Prestige
March 1972 & April, 1972	Blue Moses	Randy Weston	CTI
March 2, 1972 & March 3, 1972	Natural Illusions	Bobby Hutcherson	Blue Note
March 18, 1972	Chicken Lickin'	Funk, Inc.	Prestige
March 23, 1972 & April 12, 13 and 20, 1972	Free	Airto Moreira	CTI
April 12, 1972	Polar AC	Freddie Hubbard	CTI
May 1972	Hello Sunshine	B. C. & M. Choir	Salvation
May 1972 & June 1972	All the King's Horses	Grover Washington Jr.	Kudu
May 1, 1972	Broken Windows, Empty Hallways	Houston Person	Prestige
May 17, 1972, & May 18 and 24, 1972	Cherry	Stanley Turrentine and Milt Jackson	CTI
May 23, 1972 & July 28, 1972	Child's Dance	Art Blakey and The Jazz Messengers	Prestige
June 6, 1972 & June 7, 8 and 20 1972	Time & Love	Jackie & Roy	CTI
June 22, 1972	Ca'Purange	Dexter Gordon	Prestige
June 22, 1972 & June 28, 1972	Tangerine	Dexter Gordon	Prestige
July 1972, September, 1972 & October, 1972	Alone Again, Naturally	Esther Phillips	Kudu
July 12, 1972 & July 13, 1972	Mr. Jones	Elvin Jones	Blue Note
July 17, 1972	Friday Night Funk for Saturday Night Brothers	Rusty Bryant	Prestige
July 22, 1972	Generation	Dexter Gordon	Prestige
September 1972 & November, 1972	Morning Star	Hubert Laws	CTI
September 11, 1972 & November 7, 1972	Sweet Buns & Barbeque	Houston Person	Prestige
September 12, 1972 & September 13 and 14, 1972	Prelude	Eumir Deodato	CTI
September 21, 1972, September 28, 1972 & October 10, 1972	We Got a Good Thing Going	Hank Crawford	Kudu
October 4, 1972 & October 5, 1972	Sky Dive	Freddie Hubbard	CTI
October 6, 1972 & November 10, 1972	In Pursuit of the 27th Man	Horace Silver	Blue Note
October 28, 1972, October 30 & November 1, 1972	Got My Own	Gene Ammons	Prestige
October 28, 1972, October 30 & November 1, 1972	Big Bad Jug	Gene Ammons	Prestige
November 7, 1972 & February 2, 1973	Midnight Rider	Maynard Parker	Prestige
November 21, 1972	Moon Germs	Joe Farrell	CTI
November 24, 1972	Snake Rhythm Rock	Ivan "Boogaloo Joe" Jones	Prestige
November 29, 1972 & November 30, 1972	The Prophet	Johnny Hammond	Kudu
December 1972	Mizrab	Gábor Szabó	CTI
December 1, 1972	Hangin' Out	Funk, Inc.	Prestige
December 12, 1972 & December 13, 1972	Sunflower	Milt Jackson	CTI
January 1973	Forecast	Eric Gale	Kudu
January 10, 1973	Blues Farm	Ron Carter	CTI
February 7, 1973	Last Bolero in Berkeley	Cal Tjader	Fantasy
February 8, 1973 & February 9, 1973	Primo	Cal Tjader	Fantasy
March 1973	Soul Box	Grover Washington Jr.	Kudu
March 9, 1973	For the Good Times	Rusty Bryant	Prestige
March 14, 1973, March 15, 1973 & June 7 and 8, 1973	Don't Mess with Mister T.	Stanley Turrentine	CTI
April 1973 & May 1973	Giant Box	Don Sebesky	CTI
April 9, 1973 & April 17 and 18, 1973	Fingers	Airto Moreira	CTI
April 12, 1973 & May 16, 1973	Deodato 2	Eumir Deodato	CTI
June 28, 1973 & June 29, 1973	Wildflower	Hank Crawford	Kudu
July 1973	Black-Eyed Blues	Esther Phillips	Kudu
July 17, 1973 & July 18, 1973	Body Talk	George Benson	CTI
September 1973	Rambler	Gábor Szabó	CTI
October 1973	Penny Arcade	Joe Farrell	CTI
October 5, 1973 & October 23, 1973	Keep Your Soul Together	Freddie Hubbard	CTI
October 24, 1973	All Blues	Ron Carter	CTI
October 31, 1973 & November 1, 1973	Higher Ground	Johnny Hammond	Kudu
November 27, 1973, November 28, 1973 & December 4, 1973	Skylark	Paul Desmond	CTI
December 1973 & December 12, 1972	Goodbye	Milt Jackson and Herbert Laws	CTI
December 1973	A Wilder Alias	Jackie Cain and Roy Kral	CTI
January 9, 1974 & January 10, 1974	Olinga	Milt Jackson	CTI
February 1974-April, 1974	One	Bob James	CTI
February 6, 1974 & February 7, 8 and 11, 1975	In the Beginning	Hubert Laws	CTI
March 1974	Power of Soul	Idris Muhammad	Kudu
March 1974	Upon This Rock	Joe Farrell	CTI
April 22, 1974, May 29 and 30, 1974 & June 20, 1974	Bad Benson	George Benson	CTI
May 1974	Performance	Esther Phillips	Kudu
June 1974	Don't You Worry 'bout a Thing	Hank Crawford	Kudu
July 17, 1974, October 31, 1974 & November 1, 1974	She Was Too Good to Me	Chet Baker	CTI
September 1974, & January–March 1975	Upchurch/Tennyson	Phil Upchurch and Tennyson Stephens	Kudu
September 24, 1974 & September 25 and 26, 1974	Pure Desmond	Paul Desmond	CTI
November 1974	Mister Magic	Grover Washington Jr.	Kudu
November 1974 & December, 1974	Canned Funk	Joe Farrell	CTI
November 18, 1974	Spanish Blue	Ron Carter	CTI
December 1974 & January, 1975	Two	Bob James	CTI
January 1975–April, 1975	The Chicago Theme	Hubert Laws	CTI
March 10, 1975, & March 11 and 17 1975	Beck	Joe Beck	Kudu
April 1975 & May 1975	The Rape of El Morro	Don Sebesky	CTI
April 16, 1975 & April 23, 1975	Concierto	Jim Hall	CTI
April 22, 1975, & April 24 and 28, 1975	What a Diff'rence a Day Makes	Esther Phillips and Joe Beck	Kudu
May 1975 & July, 1975	Feels So Good	Grover Washington Jr.	Kudu
June 1975 & July, 1975	Anything Goes	Ron Carter	Kudu
June 1975 & July, 1975	I Hear a Symphony	Hank Crawford	Kudu
June 18, 1975, June 19 and 27, September 23 & October 8, 1975	House of the Rising Sun	Idris Muhammad	Kudu
July 1, 1975, July 8, October 9 & December 4 and 5, 1975	Good King Bad	George Benson	CTI
July 1975 & October, 1975	Pacific Fire	George Benson	CTI
October 17, 1975, November 14, 1975 & December 8, 1975	For All We Know	Esther Phillips and Joe Beck	Kudu
November 1975 & January, 1976	Three	Bob James	CTI
January 20, 1976, January 21, 1976 & March 12, 1976	Benson & Farrell	George Benson and Joe Farrell	CTI
March 19, 1976	The Main Attraction	Grant Green	Kudu
April 1976–June, 1976	End of a Rainbow	Patti Austin	CTI
May 17, 1976, & May 18 and 20, 1976	Yellow & Green	Ron Carter	CTI
May 24, 1976, May 25 and 26 & June 18, 1976	Velvet Darkness	Allan Holdsworth	CTI
July 1976, October, 1976 and November 1976	The Fox	Urbie Green	CTI
October 1976	A Secret Place	Grover Washington Jr.	Kudu
October 18, 1976, October 20, 1976 & December 21, 1976	Towering Toccata	Lalo Schifrin	CTI
May 1976–December, 1976	Capricorn Princess	Esther Phillips	Kudu
November 1976 & December, 1976	BJ4	Bob James	CTI
1977	Smokin'	Charlie Earland	Muse
1977	Mama Roots	Charlie Earland	Muse
January 1977	Crawl Space	Art Farmer	CTI
June 1977	Shippin' Out	"Groove" Holmes	Muse
June 23, 1977	My Mother's Eyes	Etta Jones	Muse
July 11, 1977	Brief Encounter	Eddie Daniels	Muse
September 12, 1977	Wild Flower	Houston Person	Muse
September 19, 1977 & September 21, 1977	Roadsong	Vic Juris	Muse
October 31, 1977	Everything Must Change	Johnny Lytle	Muse
November 1977	The Nearness of You	Houston Person	Muse
November 9, 1977	I Concentrate on You	Sonny Phillips	Muse
November 16, 1977, November 18, 21 & 22, 1977	Peg Leg	Ron Carter	Milestone
November 12, 1977, & November 17, 25 and 30, 1977	Silver 'n Percussion	Horace Silver	Blue Note
December 21, 1977	Bar Wars	Willis Jackson	Muse
1978	Infant Eyes	Charlie Earland	Muse
January 4, 1978 & January 5, 1978	Now	Eric Kloss	Muse
January 10, 1978	Home	Bill Hardman	Muse
January 25, 1978	Groovin' High	Hank Jones	Muse
January 26, 1978	Why Not...	Don Patterson	Muse
April 28, 1978	Single Action	Willis Jackson with Pat Martino	Muse
June 1978	A Song for You	Ron Carter	Milestone
June 21, 1978	If You Could See Me Now	Etta Jones	Muse
June 23, 1978	Mister Mysterious	Mickey Tucker	Muse
August 1, 1978	Manhattan Plaza	Ricky Ford	Muse
August 5, 1978	Sunstroke	Charlie Shoemake	Muse
August 7, 1978	L-R-G / The Maze / S II Examples	Roscoe Mitchell	Nessa
September 6, 1978	Keeper of the Flame	Richie Cole	Muse
September 13, 1978	Thundering	David Schnitter	Muse
November 3, 1978, November 10, 1978, October 26, 1979 & November 2, 1979	Silver 'n Strings Play the Music of the Spheres	Horace Silver	Blue Note
December 1978	Pick 'Em	Ron Carter	Milestone
March 1979	Parade	Ron Carter	Milestone
March 15, 1979 & March 16, 1979	Conception: The Gift of Love	Bobby Hutcherson	Columbia
April 24, 1979 & April 25, 1979	Horizon	McCoy Tyner	Milestone
May 1979	In a Temple Garden	Yusef Lateef	CTI
May 4, 1979 & June 27, 1979	The Plot Thickens	Jim McNeely	Gatemouth
May 21, 1979	Spirit Catcher	Leo Smith	Nessa
June 7, 1979	Good Cookin'	Junior Cook	Muse
June 13, 1979 & June 14 and 20, 1979	Very R.A.R.E.	Elvin Jones	Trio
August 1979	La Cuna	Ray Barretto	CTI
December 1979	New York Slick	Ron Carter	Milestone

=== 1980s ===
Recording Date	Album	Artist	Label
1980	Pleasant Afternoon	Charlie Earland	Muse
1980	Touch of Silk	Eric Gale	Columbia
January 29, 1980 & January 30, 1980	Soul Survivors	Hank Crawford and Jimmy McGriff	Milestone
March 3, 1980, March 5 and 6, 1980, & May 29, 1980	Quartets 4 X 4	McCoy Tyner	Milestone
April 24, 1980	Suspicions	Houston Person	Muse
April 24, 1980	Flying Colors	Ricky Ford	Muse
May 1980 & June 1980	Fuse One	Fuse One	CTI
May 19, 1980 & May 20, 1980	Patrão	Ron Carter	Milestone
June 20, 1980	Nothing Butt...	Willis Jackson	Muse
July 8, 1980	Save Your Love for Me	Etta Jones	Muse
August 29, 1980	Very PERSONal	Houston Person	Muse
September 12, 1980	Kabsha	Idris Muhammad	Theresa
September 24, 1980	Dannie Richmond Quintet	Dannie Richmond	Gatemouth
September 29, 1980	Parfait	Ron Carter	Milestone
December 2, 1980	Broadway	Groove Holmes	Muse
December 19, 1980 & February 4, 1981	City Lights	Jimmy McGriff	JAM
December 19, 1980 & June 23 and 24, 1981	Movin' Upside the Blues	Jimmy McGriff	JAM
1981	La Leyenda de La Hora	McCoy Tyner	Columbia
January 7, 1981	Sweet Poppa Lou	Lou Donaldson	Muse
March 18, 1981	In Style	Sonny Stitt	Muse
March 31, 1981	Mellifluous	Mel Lewis	Gatemouth
April 6, 1981 & July 1, 1981	Tenor for the Times	Ricky Ford	Muse
May 31, 1981	Clean Sweep	John McNeil	SteepleChase
June 4, 1981	Textures	Albert Dailey	Muse
June 11, 1981 & June 12, 1981	New York Concerto	Joe Chambers and Friends featuring Yoshiaki Masuo	Baystate
June 12, 1981	Somethin's Cookin'	Junior Cook	Muse
July 7, 1981	Politely	Bill Hardman	Muse
September 21, 1981-September 24, 1981	Silk	Fuse One	CTI
September 25, 1981	Away from the Crowd	Charlie Shoemake	Discovery
September 30, 1981	Urban Dreams	Pepper Adams	Palo Alto
February 9, 1982	1st Place	Jimmy Knepper	BlackHawk
February 10, 1982	Earth Jones	Elvin Jones	Palo Alto
February 11, 1982	Play of Light	Tom Harrell	BlackHawk
February 17, 1982	Four in One	Sphere	Elektra/Musician
February 22, 1982	Interpretations	Ricky Ford	Muse
March 1982-April, 1982	Studio Trieste	Chet Baker, Jim Hall and Hubert Laws	CTI
March 2, 1982	Little Jazz Bird	Meredith D'Ambrosio	Palo Alto
April 13, 1982 & April 14, 1982	Love & Peace	Elvin Jones-McCoy Tyner Quintet	Trio
June 1982-July, 1982	Gershwin Carmichael Cats	Roland Hanna	CTI
June 24, 1982	Heavy Juice	Houston Person	Muse
September 1982	Etudes	Ron Carter	Elektra/Musician
September 24, 1982	Cross Roads	Charlie Shoemake Sextet	Discovery
November 2, 1982	The Bash	Bruce Forman	Muse
December 7, 1982 & December 8, 1982	Time Speaks	Benny Golson with Freddie Hubbard and Woody Shaw	Baystate
1983	Flight Path	Sphere	Elektra/Musician
1983	Spirit	Malachi Thompson	Delmark
February 9, 1983	Future's Gold	Ricky Ford	Muse
April 8, 1983	Timeless Heart	Timeless All Stars	Timeless
April 27, 1983 & April 28, 1983	Countdown	Jimmy McGriff	Milestone
May 19, 1983	The Gentle Monster	Haywood Henry featuring Joe Newman and Hank Jones	Uptown
June 18, 1983	Two at the Top	Frank Wess and Johnny Coles	Uptown
July 11, 1983	Look Stop Listen	Philly Joe Jones Dameronia featuring Johnny Griffin	Uptown
July 19, 1983-July 22, 1983	Captain Blued	Jack Wilkins	CTI
October 7, 1983	Memories and Dreams	Sathima Bea Benjamin	BlackHawk
November 12, 1983	The Music of Kenny Dorham	Don Sickler	Uptown
November 17, 1983	Ekaya (Home)	Abdullah Ibrahim	Ekaya
December 1, 1983	Setting Standards	Woody Shaw	Muse
December 9, 1983 & December 10, 1983	The Rose Tattoo	Freddie Hubbard	Baystate
January 21, 1984 & January 22, 1984	Social Call	Charlie Rouse and Red Rodney	Uptown
January 24, 1984-January 26, 1984	Red On Red	Claudio Roditi with Kenia	CTI
February 4, 1984	The Ole Dude & The Fundance Kid	Budd Johnson and Phil Woods	Uptown
February 7, 1984	Comin' Home	Larry Coryell	Muse
March 8, 1984	Incandescent	Charlie Shoemake Sextet featuring Phil Woods	Discovery
April 23, 1984 & April 24, 1984	1+1+1	Kenny Barron and Ron Carter / Michael Moore	BlackHawk
April 28, 1984	Just Jazz	Buddy Tate and Al Grey	Uptown
May 1984	High Horse	Urszula	CTI
May 18, 1984 & May 19 and 29, 1984	Road Warriors	Les McCann and Houston Person	CTI
June 2, 1984 & June 3, 1984	One of a Kind	Don Joseph featuring Al Cohn	Uptown
July 1984 & August, 1984	Creation	Roger Kellaway featuring Houston Person	Greene Street
August 28, 1984	Shorter Ideas	Ricky Ford	Muse
November 7, 1984, November 8 and 9, 1984 & February 11, 1985	Transblucency	Maria Muldaur	Uptown
November 17, 1984 & December 6, 1988	Exhilaration	Peter Leitch	Uptown
December 14, 1984	Autumn in New York	Kenny Barron	Uptown
December 20, 1984 & December 21, 1984	Living Room	Mark Murphy	Muse
December 28, 1984	Introducing Kenny Garrett	Kenny Garrett	Criss Cross Jazz
1985	Just Be Yourself	Curtis Lundy	New Note
January 2, 1985	Opalessence	Hod O'Brien Quintet featuring Tom Harrell and Pepper Adams	Criss Cross Jazz
January 8, 1985	Equipoise	Larry Coryell	Muse
January 18, 1985 & January 19, 1985	Lonely City	Freddie Redd	Uptown
January 25, 1985	Generations	Pepper Adams and Frank Foster	Muse
January 27, 1985	Claudio!	Claudio Roditi	Uptown
April 1985 & June, 1985	Good Morning Kiss	Carmen Lundy	BlackHawk
April 8, 1985–April 13, 1985	Ron Carter Plays Bach	Ron Carter	Philips
April 14, 1985	Means of Identification	Valery Ponomarev	Reservoir
June 7, 1985 & June 8, 1985	O.T.B.	Out of the Blue	Blue Note
June 17, 1985	Windsong	Sathima Bea Benjamin	BlackHawk
June 18, 1985 & June 20, 1985	New Picture	Jimmy Heath	Landmark
June 25, 1985 & June 26, 1985	The Adams Effect	Pepper Adams	Uptown
September 5, 1985 & September 6, 1985	The Great Fontana	Carl Fontana	Uptown
October 1985	Water from an Ancient Well	Abdullah Ibrahim	BlackHawk
November 16, 1985	Red Zone	Peter Leitch	Reservoir
November 21, 1985 & November 22, 1985	Double Take	Freddie Hubbard and Woody Shaw	Blue Note
December 18, 1985	Loverman: A Tribute to Billie Holiday	Lee Torchia	Jazz Ragas
December 21, 1985	Round Trip	Ralph Moore	Reservoir
December 22, 1985	Moon Alley	Tom Harrell Quintet featuring Kenny Garrett and Kenny Barron	Criss Cross Jazz
December 23, 1985	In Good Company	Ted Brown and Jimmy Raney	Criss Cross Jazz
December 30, 1985	Wisteria	Jimmy Raney	Criss Cross Jazz
1986	In a Sentimental Mood	Bob Stewart	Stash
January 2, 1986 & January 3, 1986	Go for Whatcha Know	Jimmy Smith	Blue Note
February 14, 1986	Looking Ahead	Ricky Ford	Muse
February 17, 1986	What If?	Kenny Barron	Enja
March 24, 1986	Solid	Woody Shaw	Muse
March 31, 1986	Back Home	Warne Marsh	Criss Cross Jazz
April 3, 1986	Dream Dancing	Jimmy Knepper	Criss Cross Jazz
April 4, 1986	Presenting Michael Weiss	Michael Weiss	Criss Cross Jazz
May 1986-June, 1986	Chris Hunter	Chris Hunter	Atlantic
May 24, 1986 & May 25, 1986	Playing for Change	Jack Sheldon	Uptown
July 14, 1986, July 15, 1986, December 17, 1986 & March 3 and 4, 1987	I'll Get By	Greg Marvin	Timeless
August 25, 1986	The Left Bank of New York	Jimmy Gourley	Uptown
October 14, 1986 & October 15, 1986	The Starting Five	Jimmy McGriff	Milestone
October 19, 1986	Looking Ahead	Ricky Ford	Muse
October 21, 1986	Fine and Mellow	Etta Jones	Muse
October 27, 1986	Make Someone Happy	Lonnie Liston Smith	Doctor Jazz
November 1986	Movies	Franco Ambrosetti	Enja
November 4, 1986	Ties of Love	Buddy Montgomery	Landmark
December 23, 1986	Royal Ballads	Clifford Jordan Quartet	Criss Cross Jazz
December 24, 1986 & December 26, 1986	Kirk 'n Marcus	Kirk Lightsey Quintet featuring Marcus Belgrave	Criss Cross Jazz
December 27, 1986	Peer Pressure	Brian Lynch Sextet	Criss Cross Jazz
January 23, 1987	The Talk of the Town	Houston Person	Muse
January 27, 1987	623 C Street	Ralph Moore Quartet	Criss Cross Jazz
January 31, 1987 & February 1, 1987	It Just So Happens	Ray Anderson	Enja
February 17, 1987 & February 18, 1987	Peer Pleasure	Jimmy Heath	Landmark
February 19, 1987	Verses	Wallace Roney	Muse
March 2, 1987	Four for All	Sphere	Verve
April 1987	Don't Be Shy	Pete Malinverni Trio	Sea Breeze Jazz
May 23, 1987 & May 24, 1987	Good People	Jed Levy	Reservoir
June 4, 1987 & June 5, 1987	Obeah	Santi Debriano	Free Lance
June 11, 1987 & June 12, 1987	The Eternal Triangle	Freddie Hubbard and Woody Shaw	Blue Note
June 15, 1987 & June 16, 1987	Steppin' Up	Hank Crawford and Jimmy McGriff	Milestone
June 17, 1987	Henry B. Meets Alvin G. Once in a Wild	Spike Robinson and Al Cohn	Capri
June 19, 1987	Mean Streets – No Bridges	Jimmy Ponder	Muse
June 24, 1987	Imagination	Woody Shaw	Muse
June 26, 1987	From Paradise (Small's) to Shangri-La	Benny Waters	Muse
August 1987	Very Well	Ron Carter	Deep Moat
August 8, 1987 & December 23, 1987	Arcane	Cindy Blackman	Muse
August 13, 1987	Ron Carter Presents Dado Moroni	Dado Moroni with Ron Carter	EmArcy
September 4, 1987	Saxotic Stomp	Ricky Ford	Muse
September 5, 1987	LoveLight	Sathima Bea Benjamin	Enja
September 9, 1987	Toku Do	Larry Coryell	Muse
September 10, 1987, September 11, 1987 & November 18, 1987	Moving Forward	James Moody	RCA Novus
September 22, 1987 & September 24, 1987	Harlem Blues	Donald Byrd	Landmark
September 23, 1987	I'll Be Seeing You	Etta Jones	Muse
October 12, 1987	Basics	Houston Person	Muse
November 29, 1987 & November 30, 1987	In a Jazz Tradition	Eric Gale with Ron Carter	EmArcy
December 1987	Duo	Hank Jones and Red Mitchell	Timeless
December 11, 1987	Evening Star	Joshua Breakstone featuring Tommy Flanagan and Jimmy Knepper	Contemporary
December 24, 1987	Mixed Bag	Jim Snidero Quintet	Criss Cross Jazz
December 30, 1987 & October 11, 1989	Communications	Steve Nelson with Mulgrew Miller, Ray Drummond and Tony Reedus	Criss Cross Jazz
December 31, 1987	Green Chimneys	Kenny Barron	Criss Cross Jazz
January 5, 1988	New Outlook	Rob Schneiderman	Reservoir
January 6, 1988	Intuition	Wallace Roney	Muse
January 11, 1988	'Bout Time	Mike LeDonne Quintet	Criss Cross Jazz
February 19, 1988	Rejuvenate!	Ralph Moore Quintet	Criss Cross Jazz
February 22, 1988	Prelude	Benny Green Quintet	Criss Cross Jazz
February 24, 1988	Blues All Day Long	Richard "Groove" Holmes	Muse
March 7, 1988 & March 8, 1988	Mindif	Abdullah Ibrahim	Enja
March 12, 1988	Bird Songs	Sphere	Verve
March 15, 1988	Bagg's Flight Home	Michael Musillami and Michael Moore	Alacra
March 22, 1988 & March 23, 1988	Movies Too	Franco Ambrosetti	Enja
March 25, 1988	The Re-Entry	Jack McDuff	Muse
March 28, 1988	Jump	Jimmy Ponder	Muse
March 29, 1988	All Alone	Ron Carter	EmArcy
April 1988	Superblue	Superblue	Blue Note
April 11, 1988	Trip to Moscow	Valery Ponomarev	Reservoir
April 27, 1988, April 28, 1988 & May 9, 1988	I Remember	Dianne Reeves	Blue Note
May 6, 1988 & May 7, 1988	I'm Walkin'	Harumi Kaneko with Ron Carter	EmArcy
May 16, 1988 & May 17, 1988	The New Al Grey Quintet	Al Grey	Chiaroscuro
May 31, 1988	Gotstabe a Better Way!	James Spaulding	Muse
June 10, 1988	Bopera House	John Marshall and Tardo Hammer	V.S.O.P.
June 27, 1988 & June 28, 1988	Front Burner	Charles Earland	Milestone
July 6, 1988 & July 7, 1988	Soul Mates	Charlie Rouse and Sahib Shihab	Uptown
July 19, 1988 & July 20, 1988	Blue to the 'Bone	Jimmy McGriff	Milestone
July 26, 1988	To Reach a Dream	Jimmy Ponder	Muse
August 27, 1988 & August 28, and 30, 1988	Art Deco	Don Cherry	A&M
September 1988-October, 1988	Night Beat	Hank Crawford	Milestone
September 12, 1988 & September 13, 1988	Raincheck	Nick Brignola	Reservoir
September 27, 1988	Between Me and You	Michael Carvin	Muse
November 25, 1988	Brilliant Corners	James Spaulding	Muse
December 11, 1988 & February 4, 1989	Renee Rosnes	Renee Rosnes	Blue Note
December 15, 1988 & December 17, 1988	Images	Ralph Moore	Landmark
December 30, 1988	Portraits and Dedications	Peter Leitch Sextet featuring Bobby Watson	Criss Cross Jazz
December 29, 1988 & January 2, 1989	In This Direction	Benny Green Trio	Criss Cross Jazz
January 5, 1989 & January 7, 1989	Higher Ground	Bill Barron	Joken
January 6, 1989 & January 7, 1989	Trio	Judy Carmichael	C&D
January 10, 1989 & January 11, 1989	Mitchell's Talking	Red Mitchell	Capri
January 17, 1989 & January 19, 1989	Jazz Poet	Tommy Flanagan	Timeless
January 17, 1989 & January 19, 1989	Please Request Again	Super Jazz Trio	Timeless
January 18, 1989	Self-Portrait in Swing	Joshua Breakstone Quartet	Contemporary
January 25, 1989 & January 26, 1989	Christopher Hollyday	Christopher Hollyday	RCA Novus
January 30, 1989 & January 31, 1989	Eternal Spirit	Andrew Hill	Blue Note
February 13, 1989	Squeeze Me!	Clark Terry Spacemen	Chiaroscuro
February 23, 1989	Something in Common	Houston Person and Ron Carter	Muse
February 24, 1989	Hard Groovin'	Ricky Ford	Muse
March 1, 1989 & July 18, 1990	Another Real Good'Un	Jack McDuff	Savoy
March 3, 1989	The Standard Bearer	Wallace Roney	Muse
March 8, 1989 & March 9, 1989	Something More	Buster Williams Quintet	In + Out
March 27, 1989 & March 28, 1989	Last of the Whorehouse Piano Players	Ralph Sutton and Jay McShann	Chiaroscuro
April 4, 1989 & August 9, 1989	On the Blue Side	Hank Crawford and Jimmy McGriff	Milestone
April 24, 1989 & April 25, 1989	Superblue 2	Superblue	Blue Note
April 29, 1989 & April 30, 1989	The Half-Life of Desire	Either/Orchestra	Accurate
June 1, 1989	African River	Abdullah Ibrahim	Enja
June 19, 1989-June 21, 1989	Rhythmstick	Rhythmstick	CTI
July 27, 1989 & August 3, 1989	Indiana on Our Minds	John Eaton	Chiaroscuro
August 7, 1989	Capital Hill	Buck Hill	Muse
August 11, 1989	Sources of Inspiration	Donald Brown	Muse
August 15, 1989	Happy Ground	Johnny Lytle	Muse
September 19, 1989	Duets	Helen Merrill and Ron Carter	EmArcy
September 25, 1989	On a Different Level	Nick Brignola	Reservoir
October 10, 1989 & October 12, 1989	Getting Down to Business	Donald Byrd Sextet featuring Joe Henderson	Landmark
October 18, 1989 & October 30, 1989	Sugar	Etta Jones	Muse
October 20, 1989	Shining Hour	Larry Coryell	Muse
November 14, 1989	The Party	Houston Person	Muse
November 27, 1989 & November 28, 1989	Taking Off!	Greg Marvin	Timeless
December 9, 1989	Doin' It Right	Hilton Ruiz	RCA Novus
December 12, 1989	Revelation	Michael Carvin	Muse
December 14, 1989	Southern Touch	Sathima Bea Benjamin	Enja
December 23, 1989	Blue Afternoon	Jim Snidero	Criss Cross Jazz
December 28, 1989	Camera in a Bag	Ray Drummond Quintet	Criss Cross Jazz
December 30, 1989	Back Room Blues	Brian Lynch Quintet	Criss Cross Jazz

=== 1990s ===
Recording Date	Album	Artist	Label
1990	Lotus Blossom	Billy Strayhorn Project featuring the Michael Hashim Quartet	Stash
1990	My Time Will Come	Hubert Laws	Music Masters
1990	Welcome to the Club	Bob Stewart	VWC
January 2, 1990	The Feeling of Jazz	Mike LeDonne Quintet/Trio	Criss Cross Jazz
January 6, 1990	Now's the Time	Houston Person and Ron Carter	Muse
January 16, 1990 & January 17, 1990	On Course	Christopher Hollyday	RCA Novus
February 1, 1990 & February 2, 1990	Chippin' In	Art Blakey and The Jazz Messengers	Timeless
February 2, 1990	Some Blues	Jay McShann	Chiaroscuro
February 5, 1990	Just Friends	Buddy Tate, Nat Simkins and Houston Person	Muse
February 27, 1990	Where Were You?	Joey DeFrancesco	Columbia
February 28, 1990	Smooth Sailing	Rob Schneiderman with Rufus Reid and Billy Higgins	Reservoir
March 3, 1990 & March 5, 1990	Furthermore	Ralph Moore	Landmark
April 9, 1990 & April 11, 1990	Eight Plus	Ron Carter	Victor
April 13, 1990	The Buck Stops Here	Buck Hill	Muse
May 7, 1990	Out of the Tradition	Jack Walrath	Muse
May 23, 1990	Whip Appeal	Charles Earland	Muse
May 30, 1990 & May 31, 1990	Summit Reunion	Bob Wilber and Kenny Davern	Chiaroscuro
June 6, 1990	The Only One	Kenny Barron	Reservoir
June 6, 1990	Christmas with Etta Jones	Etta Jones	Muse
July 2, 1990 & July 3, 1990	Four Seasons	Toshiko Akiyoshi Trio	Ninety-One
July 18, 1990	No Fear, No Die	Abdullah Ibrahim	Enja
July 20, 1990	As Long as There's Music	Cedar Walton	Muse
July 31, 1990 & August 1, 1990	Remembering Bud: Cleopatra's Dream	Toshiko Akiyoshi	Ninety-One
August 15, 1990	Ridin' High	Hod O'Brien	Reservoir
August 16, 1990	May I Come In	Lorez Alexandria	Muse
August 20, 1990	Night Out	Michael Logan	Muse
September 7, 1990	Obsession	Wallace Roney	Muse
September 19, 1990 & September 21, 1990	Night Watch	Don Sickler	Uptown
September 27, 1990	Come On Down	Jimmy Ponder	Muse
October 9, 1990	Why Not!	Houston Person	Muse
October 9, 1990	What It Takes	Nick Brignola	Reservoir
October 19, 1990	Code Red	Cindy Blackman	Muse
October 30, 1990	9 by 3	Joshua Breakstone Trio	Contemporary
December 14, 1990	Hangin' with Smooth	Cecil Brooks III	Muse
December 20, 1990	Invitation	Kenny Barron	Criss Cross Jazz
1991	A Blue Streak	Michael Hashim	Stash
January 17, 1991	Lemuria-Seascape	Kenny Barron	Candid
January 21, 1991 & January 22, 1991	The Natural Moment	Christopher Hollyday	RCA Novus
January 28, 1991	Walk On	Randy Johnston	Muse
January 31, 1991	John Bunch Plays Kurt Weill	John Bunch	Chiaroscuro
February 18, 1991	Quickstep	Kenny Barron	Enja
February 25, 1991-March 12, 1991	A Moments Notice	Hilton Ruiz	RCA Novus
March 4, 1991 & March 5, 1991	My Horns of Plenty	George Coleman	Birdology
March 15, 1991	Native Colours	Billy Drummond Quintet	Criss Cross Jazz
May 2, 1991	Profile	Valery Ponomarev	Reservoir
May 9, 1991	Radio Waves	Rob Schneiderman	Reservoir
May 14, 1991 & May 15, 1991	The Right Choice	Bill Doggett	After Hours
May 29, 1991-May 31, 1991	The Proper Angle	Charles Fambrough	CTI
June 19, 1991	The Turbanator	Lonnie Smith	32 Jazz
July 7, 1991	Great Scott!	Shirley Scott	Muse
August 12, 1991	Tenor Madness Too!	Ricky Ford	Muse
August 16, 1991 & August 18, 1991	Cause and Effect	Donald Brown	Muse
August 22, 1991	The Moment	Kenny Barron Trio	Reservoir
August 26, 1991	Walk Don't Run	Joshua Breakstone Quartet featuring Kenny Barron	King
September 3, 1991 & September 6 and 8, 1991	Lush Life: The Music of Billy Strayhorn	Joe Henderson	Verve
September 26, 1991	Let's Cool One	Dick Berk and The New Jazz Adoption Agency	Reservoir
September 28, 1991	Seth Air	Wallace Roney	Muse
October 16, 1991	Take One	T. S. Monk	Blue Note
October 18, 1991	Songs of Courage	James Spaulding	Muse
October 22, 1991 & September 12–24, 1992	The Charmer	Charles Fambrough	CTI
December 1991	Desert Flowers	Abdullah Ibrahim	Enja
December 2, 1991	It's Time	Nick Brignola	Reservoir
December 3, 1991	Headlines	The Houdini's	Timeless
December 6, 1991	Unforgettable	Charles Earland	Muse
December 9, 1991	Mr. A.T.	Art Taylor	Enja
1992	Youkali	Jim Hall	CTI
1992	Mexico	Jack Wilkins	CTI
January 1992-June, 1992	Calling You	Ted Rosenthal	CTI
February 6, 1992	The Traveller	Antoine Roney	Muse
March 12, 1992 & March 13, 1992	Rhythm of the Earth	Jackie McLean	Antilles/Birdology
March 20, 1992 & March 21, 1992	Spirit Willie	Willie Williams	Enja
March 26, 1992, March 27, 1992 & August 19, 1992	3WayPlay	Dick Katz	Reservoir
April 4, 1992	Serious Hang	Jack Walrath	Muse
April 20, 1992 & April 21, 1992	Youngblood	Elvin Jones	Enja
April 28, 1992 & April 29, 1992	Handful Of Keys - The Music of Thomas "Fats" Waller	Hank Jones	Verve
May 4, 1992	In the Spirit	Jay Hoggard	Muse
May 6, 1992	Guys and Dolls	Michael Hashim Quartet	Stash
May 16, 1992-May 18, 1992	Goodfellas 2	Goodfellas	Paddle Wheel
June 30, 1992 & July 1, 1992	Try a Little Tenderness	Flip Phillips	Chiaroscuro
July 24, 1992	Impulse	Buck Hill	Muse
August 26, 1992	Standards	Rob Schneiderman	Reservoir
September 18, 1992	Telepathy	Cindy Blackman	Muse
October 15, 1992 & October 16, 1992	Going Home	Elvin Jones	Enja
November 17, 1992	A Walkin' Thing	Shirley Scott	Candid
November 18, 1992	Jubilation	Randy Johnston	Muse
December 17, 1992	Doodlin'	"Papa" John DeFrancesco	Muse
1993	Fallen Angel	Larry Coryell	CTI
January 13, 1993	Neck Peckin’ Jammie	Cecil Brooks III	Muse
January 29, 1993 & March 5, 1993	Remembering Grant Green	Joshua Breakstone	King
January 29, 1993	Sittin' on the Thing With Ming	Joshua Breakstone	Capri
February 3, 1993	East Coast Stroll	Dick Berk	Reservoir
February 22, 1993	Soulful Sin	Philip Harper	Muse
February 25, 1993–February 28, 1993	Upon Reflection – The Music of Thad Jones	Hank Jones	Verve
March 15, 1993-March 22, 1993	Lost Voices	Bill O'Connell	CTI
April 9, 1993 & April 10, 1993	Incident'ly	Ann Malcolm	Sound Hills
April 23, 1993	Kickin' in the Frontwindow	The Houdini's	Timeless
June 6, 1993	Munchin'	Wallace Roney	Muse
July 1, 1993	A Special Rapport	Peter Leitch	Reservoir
July 30, 1993	Crunchin'	Wallace Roney	Muse
August 8, 1993	Blues Nexus	James Spaulding	Muse
September 1, 1993	Beyond Expectations	John Hicks	Reservoir
September 2, 1993	Cartunes	Donald Brown	Muse
September 8, 1993 & October 5, 1993	Horn of Plenty	Warren Vaché	Muse
January 14, 1994	The Trio: 1994	Milt Hinton, Bobby Rosengarden and Derek Smith	Chiaroscuro
January 17, 1994 & January 18 and 27, 1994	Four in One	Sonny Fortune	Blue Note
January 20, 1994	Episode One: Children of Harlem	Gary Bartz	Challenge
February 22, 1994-February 24, 1994	All My Tomorrows	Grover Washington Jr.	Columbia
March 2, 1994	All About My Girl	Joey DeFrancesco	Muse
March 22, 1994 & March 23, 1994	The Place to Be	Benny Green	Blue Note
April 21, 1994 & April 22, 1994	The Clincher	The N.Y. Hardbop Quintet	TCB
May 17, 1994	Dark Blue	Rob Schneiderman	Reservoir
May 18, 1994	Blue Mance	Junior Mance	Chiaroscuro
May 19, 1994	Like Old Times	Nick Brignola	Reservoir
June 1, 1994 & June 2, 1994	Duality	Peter Leitch and John Hicks	Reservoir
June 14, 1994	Uncommon Threads	Jay Collins	Reservoir
June 19, 1994 & June 20, 1994	Le Ca: New York Romance	Barney Wilen	Venus
June 22, 1994	Reflections	David Leonhardt Trio	Big Bang
June 27, 1994-June 29, 1994	In Other Words	Teodross Avery Quartet	GRP
June 29, 1994	Free Wheelin': The Music of Lee Morgan	Claudio Roditi	Reservoir
September 8, 1994	Comin' Home	"Papa" John DeFrancesco	Muse
September 14, 1994	Judy	Judy Carmichael	C&D
September 18, 1994 & September 19, 1994	Shades of the Pine	Jeff Palmer	Reservoir
November 21, 1994 & November 22, 1994	Bert's Blues	Nancie Banks Orchestra	CAP
December 19, 1994	Young Gunn	Russell Gunn	Muse
December 27, 1994	Horn to Horn	Teddy Edwards and Houston Person	Muse
1995	Rhythm Within	Steve Turre	Antilles
January 23, 1995	The Oracle	Cindy Blackman	Muse
February 14, 1995 & February 15, 1995	Made in America	John Eaton	Chiaroscuro
February 20, 1995 & February 21, 1995	A Better Understanding	Sonny Fortune	Blue Note
March 1, 1995	Backyard	Roni Ben-Hur	TCB
March 14, 1995	Yellow Dog Blues	Summit Reunion	Chiaroscuro
March 26, 1995	Groovy Encounters	The Pratt Brothers Big Band	Amosaya
April 12, 1995 & April 13 and 14, 1995	Infinity	McCoy Tyner Trio featuring Michael Brecker	Impulse!
April 22, 1995 & April 23, 1995	Autumn in New York	Claude Williamson Trio	Venus
May 10, 1995 & May 11, 1995	The Line Forms Here	Dick Katz	Reservoir
June 6, 1995	Talk To Me Baby	Warren Vaché	Muse
July 7, 1995 & July 8, 1995	Colours & Dimensions	Peter Leitch	Reservoir
July 27, 1995	4 Flights Up	David Hazeltine Quartet featuring Slide Hampton	Sharp Nine
July 31, 1995	Resurgence	Carlos Garnett	Muse
October 8, 1995	Reality Tonic	Jay Collins	Reservoir
October 23, 1995, October 24, 1995 & November 9, 1995	Urban Renewal	Funk Inc.	Prestige
October 26, 1995	One by One	Dick Berk	Reservoir
November 9, 1995-January 5, 1995	Bob Belden's Shades of Blue	Bob Belden	Blue Note
November 11, 1995	Winter Moon	Jody Sandhaus	Saranac
November 19, 1995 & November 20, 1995	From Birdland to Broadway	Bill Crow	Venus
January 9, 1996	Keepin' in the Groove	Rob Schneiderman	Reservoir
February 12, 1996 & May 6, 1996	Comin' Back Home	Lou Montelione featuring John Stubblefield	Jazzhead
February 13, 1996 & December 11, 1996	Is There a Jackson in the House?	Chip Jackson	JazzKey Music
March 4, 1996 & March 5, 1996	Rockermotion	The N.Y. Hardbop Quintet	TCB
March 11, 1996 & March 12, 1996	From Now On	Sonny Fortune	Blue Note
March 15, 1996	Danger High Voltage	George Coleman	Two and Four
April 1, 1996	Killer Ray Rides Again	Ray Appleton Sextet	Sharp Nine
April 8, 1996, April 29, 1996 & May 13, 1996	Tight	Hank Crawford	Milestone
April 17, 1996	Louis at Large	Louis Hayes	Sharp Nine
May 16, 1996	Keep a Song in Your Soul	Michael Hahsim	Hep Jazz
June 3, 1996	This Time	Pete Malinverni	Reservoir
June 6, 1996 & June 7, 1996	The Gerry Mulligan Songbook	Bill Charlap, Ted Rosenthal, Dean Johnson and Ron Vincent	Chiaroscuro
August 15, 1996	Cape Town Flowers	Abdullah Ibrahim	Enja
August 19, 1996	The Dream Team	Jimmy McGriff	Milestone
August 22, 1996	The Classic Trio	David Hazeltine	Sharp Nine
September 24, 1996 & September 25, 1996	Into The Light	Andrés Boiarsky	Reservoir
October 1, 1996 & October 2, 1996	First Time Ever	Barry Harris Trio	Alfa
November 6, 1996	Close Encounters	Teddy Edwards and Houston Person	HighNote
November 11, 1996 & November 12, 1996	Somewhere Along the Way	Buster Williams Quintet	TCB
November 19, 1996 & November 20, 1996	Jazz Anecdotes	Bill Crow	Venus
November 26, 1996	Person-ified	Houston Person	HighNote
December 11, 1996	Let's Call This Monk!	Joshua Breakstone	Double-Time
January 3, 1997 & January 4, 1997	Roots	Cedar Walton	Astor Place
January 14, 1997	The Bass and I	Ron Carter	Somethin' Else
February 5, 1997	The Opening Round	Houston Person	Savant
February 6, 1997-February 27, 1997	Monk on Monk	T. S. Monk	N2K Encoded Music
February 12, 1997	Blowing the Blues Away	Charles Earland	HighNote
February 25, 1997	Too Soon To Tell	One for All featuring Eric Alexander	Sharp Nine
March 7, 1997	Midnight Creeper	Teddy Edwards	HighNote
March 12, 1997	As We Are Now	Renee Rosnes	Blue Note
April 3, 1997	A Star for You	Valery Ponomarev	Reservoir
April 24, 1997	Poinciana	Nick Brignola	Reservoir
May 5, 1997	Slammin' & Jammin'	Charles Earland	Savant
May 8, 1997	Alexander the Great	Eric Alexander	HighNote
May 14, 1997 & May 15, 1997	My Favorite Colors	Junko Moriya	Ninety-One
May 28, 1997	Dancing in the Dark	Rob Schneiderman	Reservoir
June 30, 1997 & July 1, 1997	Road Tested	Hank Crawford and Jimmy McGriff	Milestone
July 5, 1997	Cookin' with the Mighty Burner	Charles Earland	HighNote
July 21, 1997	Here Again	Buddy Montgomery Trio	Sharp Nine
July 24, 1997	To Be There	Scott Whitfield	Amosaya
August 21, 1997 & August 22, 1997	Trios	Helio Alves	Reservoir
August 25, 1997	All in the Family	Joey DeFrancesco and "Papa" John DeFrancesco	HighNote
August 28, 1997	Standards + Plus	Jim Snidero	Double-Time
September 3, 1997	So That's How It Is	Hod O'Brien	Reservoir
September 14, 1997 & September 15, 1997	The Missouri Connection	Jay McShann and John Hicks	Reservoir
October 6, 1997 & October 7, 1997	Dedication	Steve Kuhn	Reservoir
November 19, 1997	In the Now	Cindy Blackman	HighNote
November 27, 1997	In the Red	Red Holloway	HighNote
December 1, 1997 & December 2, 1997	New Beginnings	Steve Nelson Quartet	TCB
1998	Secret Places	Sumi Tonooka	Joken
January 14, 1998	To Each His Own	Mike LeDonne	Double-Time
January 19, 1998	Detour Ahead	Randy Johnston	HighNote
February 16, 1998 & February 17, 1998	Optimism	One for All	Sharp Nine
February 23, 1998 & February 24, 1998	After Dark	Hank Crawford	Milestone
April 28, 1998, May 1, 1998, August 3, 1999 & August 27, 2002	Hope Is in the Air: The Music of Elmo Hope	New Stories	Origin Records
May 18, 1998 & May 19, 1998	Straight Up	Jimmy McGriff	Milestone
May 27, 1998	The Champ: Dedicated to Jimmy Smith	Joey DeFrancesco	HighNote
May 28, 1998	Monk, Trane, Miles & Me	Larry Coryell	HighNote
May 30, 1998	The Champ: Round 2	Joey DeFrancesco	HighNote
June 1, 1998	My Romance	Houston Person	HighNote
July 9, 1998 & October 2, 1998	MultiColored Blue	Michael Hashim	Hep Jazz
August 5, 1998	Joey DeFrancesco Plays Sinatra His Way	Joey DeFrancesco	HighNote
August 12, 1998	The Philadelphia Connection: A Tribute to Don Patterson	Joey DeFrancesco	HighNote
October 19, 1998 & October 20, 1998	Countdown	Steve Kuhn	Reservoir
October 29, 1998	A Very Good Year	Pete Malinverni	Reservoir
November 16, 1998 & November 17, 1998	Crunch Time	Hank Crawford and Jimmy McGriff	Milestone
November 25, 1998	Hammer Time	Tardo Hammer	Sharp Nine
December 16, 1998	Chillin'	David "Fathead" Newman	HighNote
March 13, 1999	Stomp!	Charles Earland	HighNote
April 27, 1999	Soft Lights	Houston Person	HighNote
April 28, 1999	Escapade	James Spaulding	HighNote
May 10, 1999 & May 11, 1999	New Directions	Stefon Harris, Jason Moran, Greg Osby and Mark Shim	Blue Note
September 10, 1999	New High	Larry Coryell	HighNote
September 28, 1999 & September 29, 1999	McGriff's House Party	Jimmy McGriff	Milestone
October 19, 1999	If Only For One Night	Charles Earland with Najee	HighNote
November 16, 1999 & November 17, 1999	The Satchmo Legacy	Benny Bailey	Enja

=== 2000s ===
Recording Date	Album	Artist	Label
January 19, 2000	In a Sentimental Mood	Houston Person	HighNote
February 8, 2000 & February 9, 2000	The World of Hank Crawford	Hank Crawford	Milestone
February 23, 2000	Inner Urge	Larry Coryell	HighNote
March 27, 2000	Reflections	Don Sickler Quartet	HighNote
May 17, 2000	Ladies Man	Teddy Edwards	HighNote
May 31, 2000	Moment to Moment	Hideaki Yoshioka	Venus
June 6, 2000	Keepers of the Flame	Charles Earland Tribute Band	HighNote
July 8, 2000-July 12, 2000	Ya Gotta Try	Boston Brass	Summit
August 18, 2000	Dialogues	Houston Person and Ron Carter	HighNote
October 17, 2000-October 19, 2000	Feelin' It	Jimmy McGriff	Milestone
November 8, 2000	Artistic License	Santi Debriano	Savant
December 2000	The Second Milestone	Eric Alexander	Milestone
2001	I Think of You	Jody Sandhaus	CAP
March 10, 2001 & March 12, 2001	Haunted Heart	Chris Connor	HighNote
March 21, 2001	Simple Pleasure	Vincent Herring	HighNote
March 29, 2001	The Promise Land	Cedar Walton	HighNote
April 24, 2001 & April 25, 2001	Keep That Groove Going!	Plas Johnson and Red Holloway	Milestone
July 10, 2001	Blue Velvet	Houston Person	HighNote
October 22, 2001 & October 23, 2001	McGriff Avenue	Jimmy McGriff	Milestone
December 5, 2001	Cedars of Avalon	Larry Coryell	HighNote
2002	So Little Time	Ned Otter	Two and Four
May 22, 2002	Sentimental Journey	Houston Person	HighNote
June 21, 2002	Latin Tinge	Cedar Walton	HighNote
November 22, 2002	Tina May Sings the Ray Bryant Songbook	Tina May	33 Jazz
2003	A Fine Spring Morning	Jody Sandhaus	CAP
2003	Powder Keg	Ned Otter	Two and Four
May 8, 2003	Social Call	Houston Person	HighNote
August 7, 2003 & April 24 and 25, 2005	Memories of T	Ben Riley's Monk Legacy Septet	Concord Jazz
October 15, 2003	Song for the New Man	David "Fathead" Newman	HighNote
November 5, 2003	Smokin' Out Loud	Mike LeDonne	Savant
January 21, 2004	To Etta with Love	Houston Person	HighNote
February 5, 2004	Griot Libertè	Buster Williams	HighNote
May 26, 2004	The Spirits Up Above	Steve Turre	HighNote
June 10, 2004	Dead Center	Eric Alexander	HighNote
July 24, 2004	Wishing on the Moon	Meredith D'Ambrosio	Sunnyside
August 4, 2004	You Taught My Heart to Sing	Houston Person with Bill Charlap	HighNote
August 14, 2004	I Remember Brother Ray	David "Fathead" Newman	HighNote
October 1, 2004 & October 21, 2004	Dedicated to You	Gloria Cooper	Origin
December 22, 2004	Put on a Happy Face	Stan Hope	Savant
December 28, 2004	Fun House	Reuben Wilson	Savant
May 9, 2005	The Big Push	Larry Willis	HighNote
May 10, 2005	Night Song	Mike LeDonne	Savant
June 21, 2005	All Soul	Houston Person	HighNote
July 29, 2005	It's All in the Game	Eric Alexander	HighNote
October 26, 2005	Just Between Friends	Houston Person and Ron Carter	HighNote
November 14, 2005	Reflections	Frank Morgan	HighNote
April 5, 2006	Sweet Love of Mine	John Hicks	HighNote
April 7, 2006	One Flight Down	Cedar Walton	HighNote
April 12, 2006	How Little We Know	Jeff Hackworth	Big Bridge Music
April 19, 2006	Keep Searchin'	Steve Turre	HighNote
May 17, 2006 & May 18, 2006	Music Maestro Please	Freddie Cole with the Bill Charlap Trio	HighNote
August 29, 2006	Cry for Peace	Peter Lerner	Blujazz
October 2, 2006	Blue Fable	Larry Willis	HighNote
December 5, 2006 & December 7, 2006	Light On	Tom Harrell	HighNote
January 17, 2007	Temple of Olympic Zeus	Eric Alexander	HighNote
May 22, 2007	Thinking of You	Houston Person	HighNote
May 31, 2007	Tippin'	Jim Snidero	Savant
October 9, 2007	The Offering	Larry Willis	HighNote
2008	Across the Tracks	Scott Hamilton	Concord Jazz
February 1, 2008	Seasoned Wood	Cedar Walton	HighNote
December 12, 2008	The Blessing	David "Fathead" Newman	HighNote
2009	The Observer	Jon Irabagon	Concord Jazz
April 14, 2009 & April 28, 2009	Revival of the Fittest	Eric Alexander	HighNote
April 22, 2009-April 25, 2009	Yesterday You Said Tomorrow	Christian Scott	Concord Jazz
May 20, 2009	Voices Deep Within	Cedar Walton	HighNote
June 23, 2009	Mellow	Houston Person	HighNote
August 11, 2009	Men of Honor	Jeremy Pelt	HighNote
June 23, 2010	Moment to Moment	Houston Person	HighNote
September 15, 2010	The Talented Mr. Pelt	Jeremy Pelt	HighNote
November 4, 2010	Don't Follow the Crowd	Eric Alexander	HighNote
December 18, 2010 & December 19, 2010	Above All	Jonny King	Sunnyside
February 28, 2011	The Bouncer	Cedar Walton	HighNote
June 22, 2011	So Nice	Houston Person	HighNote
2012	Ithamara Koorax Sings Getz/Gilberto	Ithamara Koorax	Jazz Vision
March 22, 2012	Wonderful! Wonderful!	Joey DeFrancesco	HighNote
May 10, 2012	Mr. Lucky	Harold Mabern	HighNote
July 5, 2012	Naturally	Houston Person	HighNote
October 22, 2012	Touching	Eric Alexander	HighNote
June 24, 2013	One for Rudy	Joey DeFrancesco	HighNote
July 3, 2013	Nice 'n' Easy	Houston Person	HighNote
November 26, 2013	Chicago Fire	Eric Alexander	HighNote
June 30, 2014	The Melody Lingers On	Houston Person	HighNote
2015	Something Personal	Houston Person	HighNote
April 2, 2015	The Real Thing	Eric Alexander	HighNote
December 22, 2015	Chemistry	Houston Person and Ron Carter	HighNote
2017	Ithamara Koorax Sings the Jazz Masters	Ithamara Koorax	Jazz Vision
April 1, 2017 & April 2, 2017	The Masquerade is Over	Massimo Faraò Double Piano Quartet	Venus
June 4, 2017	Rain or Shine	Houston Person	HighNote
March 27, 2018	Remember Love	Houston Person and Ron Carter	HighNote
September 2018-December 2018	Blue Dawn-Blue Nights	Wallace Roney	HighNote
May 8th & 9th, 2022	The Heavy Hitters	Mike LeDonne with Eric Alexander, Jeremy Pelt, Vincent Herring, Peter Washington, Kenny Washington, Rale Micic	Cellar Music Group
July 14, 2025	Blue Fire: The Van Gelder Session	Dave Stryker	Strikezone Records

== See also ==
- Official Web site
- List of US recording studios
- National Register of Historic Places listings in Bergen County, New Jersey
