= Twobones =

- Origin: Switzerland
- Genres: Jazz
- Years active: 1986–present
- Labels: TCB
- Members: Paul Haag; Danilo Moccia; Peter Schmidlin; Isla Eckinger; Tutilo Odermatt
- Website: paulhaag.ch

Twobones is a Swiss mainstream jazz band founded in 1986. The core members of the group are trombone players Paul Haag and Danilo Moccia. Other members include Isla Eckinger (double bass), Peter Schmidlin (drums), and Tutilo Odermatt (piano). They modeled their trombone duo band after trombonists J. J. Johnson and Kai Winding.

== Discography ==
=== Studio albums ===
| Date of Release | Title | Label | Awards |
|---|---|---|---|
| 1992 | Easy on the Ear | TCB | |
| 1994 | To Kai and Jay | TCB | |
| 1998 | Spiral Stairway | TCB | |
| 2000 | Ballads for Bluehorns | TCB | |

=== Live albums ===
| Date of Release | Title | Label | Awards |
|---|---|---|---|
| 2007 | Get that Groove! – A Tribute to Eric Peter | TCB | |
| 2008 | Groovin' Bones | TCB | |
