= Danny Mixon =

American jazz pianist (1949–2026)

- Born: Daniel Asbury Mixon; August 19, 1949; New York City, U.S.
- Died: May 1, 2026 (aged 76)
- Genres: Mainstream jazz, hard bop, post-bop
- Occupation: Musician
- Instruments: Piano, vocals
- Website: dannymixonsounds.com

Daniel Asbury Mixon (August 19, 1949 – May 1, 2026) was an American mainstream jazz, hard bop and post-bop pianist.

== Life and career ==
Mixon was born in Harlem, New York City, on August 19, 1949. He gained some attention in the 1970s and continued to record and play in New York and abroad. He started off as a tap dancer, attending the Ruth Williams Dance Studio. Later, he attended the High School of Performing Arts with Dance as his major but soon switched to playing the piano after being inspired by visits with his grandfather to see jazz artists playing at the Apollo Theater.

In 1966, at the age of 17, Mixon was invited to play with the trumpet player Sam Brown's band backing Patti LaBelle & the Blue Belles in Atlantic City at Reggie's Cocktail Lounge. After working with Joe Lee Wilson from 1967 to 1970, Mixon started to play regularly with Betty Carter during the years 1971–72.

He formed his own jazz trio, recorded with the Piano Choir and worked with a variety of important jazz musicians including Kenny Dorham, Cecil Payne, Art Blakey's Jazz Messengers, Frank Foster, Grant Green, Pharoah Sanders (1975), Joe Williams (jazz singer), Eddie Jefferson and Dee Dee Bridgewater.

1976 saw Mixon playing in Charles Mingus' band. He then played with Dannie Richmond in the late 1970s, toured the U.S. with Yusef Lateef and played a few years with the Lionel Hampton Big Band.

Mixon worked continuously with Frank Foster since his twenties, as a pianist for the Big Band; Frank Foster's Loud Minority, and his quartet - the Non-Electric Company.

He played piano on many recordings. He appeared with Hank Crawford on the compact discs Tight and After Dark and also recorded with The Danny Mixon Trio.

In 2004, Mixon was presented with an award honoring him as a legendary pianist, by the National Jazz Museum in Harlem from their series "Harlem Speaks" honoring Harlem Heroes. In September 2007, he was Honoree at the 18th Annual Legends Purple Carpet Awards, honoring contributors of the promotional arts and entertainment industry at Brooklyn's Toro's.

Mixon was also the musical director of the Lenox Lounge in Harlem, where he also regularly played with the Danny Mixon Trio, until it closed in 2012.

He performed with Antoinette Montague at Marcus Garvey Park's Charlie Parker Jazz Festival 2016 in New York City, and several others venues in 2016 New York City.

Mixon died from prostate cancer on May 1, 2026, at the age of 76.

== Selected discography ==
=== As leader ===
- Mixin' With Mixon (Cinderella, 1983)
- Building Bridges (2004)
- On My Way (2003)
- Pass It On (2015)

With The Piano Choir

- Handscapes (Strata-East, 1974)

=== As sideman ===
With Betty Carter

- The Betty Carter Album (Bet-Car Productions, 1976)

With Hank Crawford

- Tight (Milestone, 1996)
- After Dark (Milestone, 1998)
- The World of Hank Crawford (Milestone, 2000)

With Charles Mingus

- Cumbia & Jazz Fusion (Atlantic, 1978)

With Dannie Richmond

- Ode to Mingus (Soul Note, 1979)

With Pharoah Sanders

- Live in Paris (1975) (Lost ORTF Recordings) (Transversales Disques, 2020)

With Joe Lee Wilson

- Without A Song (Inner City Records, 1978)
