= The Dream Team (album) =

Studio album by Jimmy McGriff
- Released: 1997
- Recorded: August 19, 1996
- Studio: Van Gelder Studio, Englwood Cliffs, NJ
- Genre: Jazz
- Length: 61:46
- Label: Milestone; MCD-9268-2
- Producer: Bob Porter

Jimmy McGriff chronology
Blues Groove (1995)	The Dream Team (1997)	Road Tested (1997)

The Dream Team is an album by organist Jimmy McGriff recorded in 1996 and released on the Milestone label the following year.

== Reception ==
Professional ratings
Review scores
Source	Rating
Allmusic	4.5/5 stars
The Penguin Guide to Jazz Recordings	3/4 stars

Allmusic's Richard S. Ginell said: "Everybody swings, everybody listens intuitively to each other and feels the down-home churchy grooves, and they recorded it all in one day at Rudy Van Gelder's studio. This has the ingredients for ranking as an instant classic in this idiom". On All About Jazz, Douglas Payne noted "It's nice to hear Jimmy McGriff like this, and I highly recommend The Dream Team to the McGriff mob and those folks into some good contemporary acid jazz". In JazzTimes, David Franklin wrote "For that good ol’ blues-drenched, Hammond B-3-style-jazz, you can't do much better than this. The recording boasts some of the masters of the genre and they live up to expectations. ... Infectious music you'll want to come back to".

== Track listing ==
All compositions by Jimmy McGriff except where noted

1. "McGriffin" (David "Fathead" Newman) – 7:12
2. "Ain't It Funny How Time Slips Away" (Willie Nelson) – 6:19
3. "Red Hot 'n' New" – 7:40
4. "Fleetwood Stroll" – 9:49
5. "Don't Blame Me" (Jimmy McHugh, Dorothy Fields) – 11:29
6. "'Tain't Nobody's Bizness If I Do" (Porter Grainger, Everett Robbins) – 8:14
7. "Things Ain't What They Used to Be" (Mercer Ellington, Ted Persons) – 11:13

== Personnel ==
- Jimmy McGriff – Hammond X-B3 organ
- David "Fathead" Newman – tenor saxophone
- Red Holloway – tenor saxophone, alto saxophone
- Mel Brown – guitar
- Bernard Purdie − drums
