= Hank Crawford's Back =

Studio album by Hank Crawford
- Released: 1976
- Recorded: Late 1976
- Studio: Mediasound, New York City
- Genre: Jazz
- Length: 33:30
- Label: Kudu; KU-33
- Producer: Creed Taylor

Hank Crawford chronology
I Hear a Symphony (1975)	Hank Crawford's Back (1976)	Tico Rico (1977)

Hank Crawford's Back is the seventeenth album led by saxophonist Hank Crawford and his sixth for the Kudu label which was released in 1976.

== Reception ==
Professional ratings
Review scores
Source	Rating
AllMusic	3/5 stars

AllMusic awarded the album 3 stars.

== Track listing ==
1. "Funky Pigeon" (David Matthews) – 6:05
2. "I Can't Stop Loving You" (Don Gibson) – 3:04
3. "You'll Never Find Another Love Like Mine" (Kenny Gamble, Leon Huff) – 6:45
4. "Canadian Sunset" (Eddie Heywood, Norman Gimbel) – 6:06
5. "Midnight Over Memphis" (John Stubblefield) – 11:30

== Personnel ==
- Hank Crawford – alto saxophone
- Fred Wesley – trombone
- Jeremy Steig – flute
- Richard Tee – electric piano
- Eric Gale – guitar
- Anthony Jackson (tracks 4 & 5), Gary King (tracks 1–3) – bass
- Steve Gadd (tracks 4 & 5), Andy Newmark (tracks 1–3) – drums
- Nicky Marrero – percussion
- Frank Floyd, Zachary Sanders, Ray Simpson – vocals
- David Matthews – arranger
