= The World of Hank Crawford =

Studio album by Hank Crawford
- Released: 2000
- Recorded: February 8 & 9, 2000
- Studio: Van Gelder Studio, Englewood Cliffs, NJ
- Genre: Jazz
- Length: 56:29
- Label: Milestone; MCD-9304-2
- Producer: Bob Porter

Hank Crawford chronology
Crunch Time (1999)	The World of Hank Crawford (2000)

The World of Hank Crawford is an album by saxophonist Hank Crawford recorded in 2000 and released on the Milestone label.

== Reception ==
Professional ratings
Review scores
Source	Rating
Allmusic	4/5 stars
The Penguin Guide to Jazz Recordings	3/4 stars

Allmusic's Richard S. Ginell said: "Rather than stick completely with the down-home soul-jazz rituals that have served him well in his previous several releases, Crawford mixes up his pitches in this more-inclusively titled outing -- or he seems to. ... Nice change of pace, though not that big of a change for this soulful veteran". In JazzTimes, Owen Cordle noted "Crawford always puts deep feeling into his alto saxophone playing and he always gives you the melody, the blues and a groove. He’s consistent and economical. This album is his 15th for Milestone, and it goes back to some of the jazz tunes he heard in his early days".

== Track listing ==
1. "Grab the World" (Mansoor Sabree) – 7:03
2. "Way Back Home" (Wilton Felder) – 7:30
3. "Trust in Me" (Milton Ager, Jean Schwartz, Ned Wever) – 5:03
4. "Back in the Day" (Hank Crawford) – 5:12
5. "Love for Sale" (Cole Porter) – 6:38
6. "Come Sunday" (Duke Ellington) – 5:14
7. "Sonnymoon for Two" (Sonny Rollins) – 7:32
8. "Good Bait" (Tadd Dameron, Count Basie) – 7:01
9. "Star Eyes" (Gene de Paul, Don Raye) – 5:12

== Personnel ==
- Hank Crawford – alto saxophone
- Marcus Belgrave – trumpet, flugelhorn (tracks 1–2 & 8)
- Ronnie Cuber – baritone saxophone (tracks 1–2 & 8)
- Danny Mixon – piano, organ
- Melvin Sparks – guitar (tracks 1–8)
- Stanley Banks – bass (tracks 1–2, 4–6 & 8–9)
- Kenny Washington − drums
