= Straight Up (Jimmy McGriff album) =

Studio album by Jimmy McGriff
- Released: 1998
- Recorded: May 18 and 19, 1998
- Studio: Van Gelder Studio, Englwood Cliffs, NJ
- Genre: Jazz
- Length: 61:45
- Label: Milestone; MCD-9285-2
- Producer: Bob Porter

Jimmy McGriff chronology
Road Tested (1997)	Straight Up (1998)	Crunch Time (1999)

Straight Up is an album by the organist Jimmy McGriff, recorded in 1998 and released on the Milestone label.

== Reception ==
Professional ratings
Review scores
Source	Rating
AllMusic	4.5/5 stars
The Penguin Guide to Jazz Recordings	3/4 stars

AllMusic's Richard S. Ginell said: "McGriff proves once again that it's never too late to come up with a good record in this vein. And 'good' is understating it; this is a truly great soul-jazz session, possibly the best of McGriff's end-of-the-century renaissance up to this date". On All About Jazz, Douglas Payne noted: "Straight Up isn't perfect. But the variety on display here is nice and the ageless organ master proves he can still grind with a style that's worth hearing"; the site's Ed Kopp observed that "McGriff is one of the most soulful B3 organ players alive, a verity he proves yet again on this fine release".

In JazzTimes, Patricia Myers wrote that "this issue is a must for fans of both jazz organ and tenor sax".

== Track listing ==
1. "Doin' My Thing" (Jimmy McGriff) – 9:19
2. "It Had to Be You" (Isham Jones, Gus Kahn) – 5:47
3. "Straight Up" (David "Fathead" Newman) – 7:03
4. "Blues for the Baby Grand" (Rodney Jones) – 6:05
5. "It's Your Thing" (Ronald Isley, O'Kelly Isley Jr., Rudolph Isley) – 9:11
6. "Dream" (Johnny Mercer) – 9:03
7. "Brother Griff" (Newman) – 8:08
8. "Oleo" (Sonny Rollins) – 7:09

== Personnel ==
- Jimmy McGriff – Hammond X-B3 organ
- David "Fathead" Newman, Frank Wess – tenor saxophone, flute
- Wayne Boyd – guitar
- Bernard Purdie − drums
