= Keep That Groove Going! =

Studio album by Plas Johnson and Red Holloway
- Released: October 2, 2001
- Recorded: April 24 and 25, 2001
- Studio: Van Gelder Studio, Englewood Cliffs, NJ
- Genre: Jazz
- Length: 55:22
- Label: Milestone; MCD-9319-2
- Producer: Bob Porter

Plas Johnson chronology
Evening Delight (2000)	Keep That Groove Going! (2001)	All Blues (2009)

Red Holloway chronology
Standing Room Only (2000)	Keep That Groove Going! (2001)	Coast to Coast (2003)

Keep That Groove Going! is an album by saxophonists Plas Johnson and Red Holloway recorded in 2001 and released on the Milestone label.

== Reception ==
Professional ratings
Review scores
Source	Rating
Allmusic	4/5 stars
The Penguin Guide to Jazz Recordings	3/4 stars

Allmusic's Richard S. Ginell said: "another Bob Porter-produced soul-jazz cooker, effortlessly suggesting tenor battles of the past. They are a most compatible duo, with Johnson displaying a slightly lighter, more overt rhythm & blues tinge, and their sure-footed note selection makes them a pleasure to hear". In JazzTimes Bill Milkowski called it a "spirited session" and "superb recording". All About Jazz noted "Beneath the emotionally charged surface of both Johnson and Holloway’s playing lies a wellspring of intelligence and good taste. ... the septuagenarians tackle a diverse program that refutes the notion that there are artistic limitations in sustaining a groove".

== Track listing ==
1. "Keep That Groove Going!" (Red Holloway) – 6:07
2. "Stuffy" (Coleman Hawkins) – 4:13
3. "Serenade in Blue" (Harry Warren, Mack Gordon) – 6:49 [Holloway solo feature]
4. "Go Red Go" (Arnett Cobb) – 4:13
5. "Bretheren!" (Holloway) – 7:24
6. "Pass the Gravy" (Plas Johnson) – 8:42
7. "Jammin' for Mr. Lee" (Johnson) – 6:35
8. "Cry Me a River" (Arthur Hamilton) – 5:04 [Johnson solo feature]
9. "Dream a Little Dream of Me" (Fabian Andre, Wilbur Schwandt, Gus Kahn) – 6:15

== Personnel ==
- Red Holloway (tracks 1–7 & 9), Plas Johnson (tracks 1, 2 & 4–9) – tenor saxophone
- Gene Ludwig – organ
- Melvin Sparks (tracks 1–8) – guitar
- Kenny Washington − drums
