= Crunch Time (album) =

Album by Hank Crawford and Jimmy McGriff

Studio album by Hank Crawford and Jimmy McGriff
- Released: March 9, 1999
- Recorded: November 16 & 17, 1998
- Studio: Van Gelder Studio, Englewood Cliffs, NJ
- Genre: Jazz
- Length: 60:30
- Label: Milestone; MCD-9287-2
- Producer: Bob Porter

Hank Crawford chronology
After Dark (1998)	Crunch Time (1999)	The World of Hank Crawford (2000)

Jimmy McGriff chronology
Straight Up (1998)	Crunch Time (1999)	McGriff's House Party (1999)

Crunch Time is an album by saxophonist Hank Crawford and organist Jimmy McGriff recorded in 1998 and released on the Milestone label the following year.

== Reception ==
Professional ratings
Review scores
Source	Rating
AllMusic	3/5 stars
The Penguin Guide to Jazz Recordings	3/4 stars

AllMusic's Richard S. Ginell said: "Not much is new here -- which may be precisely the point of the exercise -- and while these sessions do not quite rise to the truckin' heights of some other McGriff Milestone discs from this period, there is still plenty to groove to in these track". In JazzTimes, Geraldine Wyckoff stated: "Crunch Time is classic Crawford/McGriff ... The sense of timing throughout this album and within these musicians is at the music’s essence. It’s the element which makes Crunch Time-and all of Crawford’s and McGriff’s music-so timeless".

== Track listing ==
1. "Bow Legs" (Hank Crawford) – 6:31
2. "It's All Good" (Lewis Lebish, Melvin Sparks) – 8:10
3. "Don't Deceive Me (Please Don't Go)" (Chuck Willis) – 5:43
4. "Sandu" (Clifford Brown) – 7:09
5. "Crunch Time" (Jimmy McGriff) – 7:12
6. "What's Going On" (Marvin Gaye, Renaldo Benson, Al Cleveland) – 7:13
7. "Without a Song" (Vincent Youmans, Edward Eliscu, Fred Rose) – 4:11
8. "The Preacher" (Horace Silver) – 6:31

== Personnel ==
- Hank Crawford – alto saxophone
- Jimmy McGriff – organ
- Melvin Sparks, Cornell Dupree (tracks 1, 3, 6 & 7) – guitar
- Bernard Purdie − drums
