= Blue to the 'Bone =

Studio album by Jimmy McGriff
- Released: 1988
- Recorded: July 19 and 20, 1988
- Studio: Van Gelder Studio, Englwood Cliffs, NJ
- Genre: Jazz
- Length: 44:12
- Label: Milestone; M-9163/MCD-9163-2
- Producer: Bob Porter

Jimmy McGriff chronology
Steppin' Up (1987)	Blue to the 'Bone (1988)	On the Blue Side (1989)

Blue to the 'Bone is an album by organist Jimmy McGriff, recorded in 1988 and released on the Milestone label.

== Reception ==
Professional ratings
Review scores
Source	Rating
AllMusic	4/5 stars
The Penguin Guide to Jazz Recordings	3/4 stars

AllMusic's Michael Erlewine said: "The trombone is not that often found in the small-organ combo format and may not appeal to everyone. Smooth, yet funky".

== Track listing ==
1. "Ain't That Funk for You" (Al Grey) – 6:25
2. "For All We Know" (J. Fred Coots, Sam M. Lewis) – 5:10
3. "Don't Get Around Much Anymore" (Duke Ellington, Bob Russell) – 10:18
4. "Secret Love" (Sammy Fain, Paul Francis Webster) – 9:03
5. "Hangin' In" (Jimmy McGriff, Melvin Sparks) – 7:43
6. "After the Dark" (Reggy Marks) – 5:33

== Personnel ==
- Jimmy McGriff – organ
- Al Grey – trombone
- Bill Easley – alto saxophone, tenor saxophone
- Melvin Sparks – guitar
- Bernard Purdie − drums
