= I Hear a Symphony (Hank Crawford album) =

Studio album by Hank Crawford
- Released: 1975
- Recorded: June and July 1975
- Studio: Van Gelder Studio, Englewood Cliffs, NJ
- Genre: Jazz
- Length: 33:15
- Label: Kudu; KU-26
- Producer: Creed Taylor

Hank Crawford chronology
Don't You Worry 'bout a Thing (1975)	I Hear a Symphony (1975)	Hank Crawford's Back (1976)

I Hear a Symphony is the sixteenth album led by saxophonist Hank Crawford and his fifth released on the Kudu label in 1975.

== Reception ==
Professional ratings
Review scores
Source	Rating
AllMusic	3/5 stars

AllMusic awarded the album 3 stars and its review by Thom Jurek states, "this set is a cooker. Certainly the production is a bit dated, but the funky-butt moves in Crawford's soulful playing and the tough riffing of Gale more than transcend it".

== Track listing ==
1. "I Hear a Symphony" (Brian Holland, Lamont Dozier, Eddie Holland) – 4:46
2. "Madison (Spirit, The Power)" (David Matthews) – 3:55
3. "Hang it on the Ceiling" (Matthews) – 4:13
4. "The Stripper" (David Rose) – 4:03
5. "Sugar Free" (Hank Crawford) – 4:42
6. "Love Won't Let Me Wait" (Vinnie Barrett, Bobby Eli) – 4:03
7. "I'll Move You No Mountain" (Jerry Ragovoy, Aaron Schroeder) – 4:08
8. "Baby! This Love I Have" (Minnie Riperton, Richard Rudolph, Leon Ware) – 3:38

== Personnel ==
- Hank Crawford – alto saxophone
- Jon Faddis, John Frosk, Robert Millikan, Alan Rubin – trumpet, flugelhorn
- Barry Rogers, Fred Wesley – trombone
- Paul Faulise, Tony Studd, Dave Taylor – bass trombone
- Leon Pendarvis – electric piano
- Eric Gale – guitar
- Gary King – bass
- Steve Gadd – drums
- Ralph MacDonald – percussion
- Idris Muhammad – shaker, tambourine
- Patti Austin – lead vocals
- Hilda Harris, Deborah McDuffie, Maeretha Stewart – vocals
- Harry Cykman, Lewis Eley, Max Ellen, Paul Gershman, Emanuel Green, Harold Kohon, Charles Libove, Joe Malin, David Nadien, John Pintavalle, Raoul Poliakin, Max Pollikoff, Richard Sortomme – violin
- Seymour Barab, Charles McCracken, Alan Shulman – cello
- David Matthews – arranger
