= McGriff's House Party =

Studio album by Jimmy McGriff with Dr. Lonnie Smith and Eric Alexander
- Released: April 18, 2000
- Recorded: September 28 and 29, 1999
- Studio: Van Gelder Studio, Englwood Cliffs, NJ
- Genre: Jazz
- Length: 59:52
- Label: Milestone; MCD-9300-2
- Producer: Bob Porter

Jimmy McGriff chronology
| Crunch Time (1999) | McGriff's House Party (2000) | Feelin' It (2000) |

McGriff's House Party is an album by organist Jimmy McGriff recorded in 1999 and released on the Milestone label the following year.

== Reception ==
Professional ratings
Review scores
| Source | Rating |
|---|---|
| Allmusic | 3/5 stars |
| The Penguin Guide to Jazz Recordings | 3/4 stars |

Allmusic's Al Campbell said: "McGriff's House Party took two days to complete and found the participants in a hard funk mood. ... another enjoyable and recommended soul groove session". Douglas Payne noted "McGriff seems ready to leave the lounge and get back to the soul and funk of the chittlin circuit. ... A nice comeback for one of the funkiest organists, when he wants to be". In JazzTimes, Owen Cordle wrote "The Philadelphia organist knows how to initiate an infectious rhythmic feeling and keep it happening via hip footwork and judicious keyboard jabs ... All told, this house party, one of the organist’s best, is worth revisiting often".

== Track listing ==
All compositions by Rodney Jones except where noted

1. "Neckbones a la Carte" – 8:04
2. "Blues for Stitt" (Bill Easley) – 8:21
3. "Red Roses for a Blue Lady" (Sid Tepper, Roy C. Bennett) – 5:48
4. "Red Cadillac Boogaloo" (George Benson) – 6:02
5. "That's All" (Alan Brandt, Bob Haymes) – 6:33
6. "McGriff's House Party" – 7:29
7. "Grits, Gravy and Groove" – 7:33
8. "Dishin' the Dirt" (Lonnie Smith) – 10:02

== Personnel ==
- Jimmy McGriff – Hammond X-B3 organ
- Kenny Rampton – trumpet (tracks: 4–6,8)
- Eric Alexander, Bill Easley (tracks: 1–3,7) – tenor saxophones
- Dr. Lonnie Smith – organ (tracks: 4–6,8)
- Rodney Jones – guitar
- Bernard Purdie − drums
