= Blues Groove (Jimmy McGriff album) =

Studio album by Jimmy McGriff and Hank Crawford
- Released: January 30, 1996
- Recorded: July 1995
- Genre: Blues, jazz
- Label: Telarc Jazz
- Producer: John Snyder

Jimmy McGriff and Hank Crawford chronology
Right Turn on Blue (1994)	Blues Groove (1996)	Road Tested (1997)

Blues Groove is an album by the American musicians Jimmy McGriff and Hank Crawford, released on January 30, 1996. The supported it by playing the 1996 Toronto Jazz Festival.

== Production ==
The album was recorded in July 1995. McGriff and Crawford were backed by Vance James on drums and Wayne Boyd on guitar. McGriff played a Hammond XB-3. "Splanky" was written by Neal Hefti. "Mercy, Mercy, Mercy" is a version of the song made famous by Cannonball Adderley. "Frame for the Blues" was composed by Slide Hampton. "All Blues" is an interpretation of the Miles Davis song. "Could Be" was written by Les McCann.

== Critical reception ==
Professional ratings
Review scores
Source	Rating
All Music Guide	4/5 stars
The Encyclopedia of Popular Music	3/5 stars
MusicHound Jazz: The Essential Album Guide	4/5 stars
The Penguin Guide to Jazz Recordings	3/4 stars
The Rolling Stone Jazz & Blues Album Guide	3.5/5 stars
The Star-Ledger	3/4 stars
The Vancouver Sun	3/5 stars

The Omaha World-Herald noted that "the co-leaders offer funky stuff that sounds a bit tired when Boyd is not in the spotlight." The Vancouver Sun stated, "This is classic funk-blues playing, where each soloist builds to a crescendo, then cuts out as the band brings the energy level back down for the next player to stoke the fire." The Toronto Star said that "the awesome expressive power and range of McGriff's B3 organ and Crawford's distinctive, fat and emotional alto sax heat proceedings".

== Track listing ==
No.	Title	Length
1.	"Movin' Upside the Blues"
2.	"Splanky"
3.	"Frame for the Blues"
4.	"Lew's Piece"
5.	"All Blues"
6.	"The Sermon"
7.	"When I Fall in Love"
8.	"Could Be"
9.	"Don't Cry, Baby"
10.	"Mercy, Mercy, Mercy"
