= After Dark (Hank Crawford album) =

Studio album by Hank Crawford
- Released: 1998
- Recorded: February 23 and 24, 1998
- Studio: Van Gelder Studio, Englewood Cliffs, NJ
- Genre: Jazz
- Length: 62:40
- Label: Milestone; MCD-9279-2
- Producer: Bob Porter

Hank Crawford chronology
Road Tested (1997)	After Dark (1998)	Crunch Time (1999)

After Dark is an album by saxophonist Hank Crawford recorded in 1998 and released on the Milestone label.

== Reception ==
Professional ratings
Review scores
Source	Rating
Allmusic	3/5 stars
The Penguin Guide to Jazz Recordings	2.5/4 stars

Allmusic's Alex Henderson said: "After Dark finds Hank Crawford excelling by sticking to what he does so well: uncomplicated, blues-drenched, gospel-minded soul-jazz. Warmth and accessibility continued to define the veteran alto saxophonist, who sounds like he's still very much in his prime". In JazzTimes, Miles Jordan called it a "blues-saturated disc which features altoist Crawford with a terrific combo" and noted "Crawford is through and through a bluseman, albeit one without portfolio. Maybe there’s too much “jazz” in his playing. Whatever the case, this CD-like most of his work definitely deserves a bigger audience".

== Track listing ==
1. "My Babe" (Willie Dixon) – 5:41
2. "Share Your Love with Me" (Alfred Braggs, Deadric Malone) – 5:03
3. "Git It!" (Melvin Sparks) – 7:31
4. "Tain't Nobody's Bizness If I Do" (Porter Grainger, Everett Robbins) – 5:54
5. "Our Day Will Come" (Mort Garson, Bob Hilliard) – 7:23
6. "Mother Nature" (Hank Crawford) – 6:24
7. "That's All" (Bob Haymes, Alan Brandt) – 5:11
8. "St. Louis Blues" (W. C. Handy) – 6:21
9. "Beale Street After Dark" (Hank Crawford) – 7:21
10. "Amazing Grace" (John Newton) – 5:50

== Personnel ==
- Hank Crawford – alto saxophone
- Danny Mixon – piano, organ
- Melvin Sparks – guitar
- Wilbur Bascomb (tracks 1, 5, 9 & 10), Stanley Banks (tracks 2–4, 7 & 8) – bass
- Bernard Purdie − drums
