= Tight (Hank Crawford album) =

Studio album by Hank Crawford
- Released: 1996
- Recorded: April 8 and 29 & May 13, 1996
- Studio: Van Gelder Studio, Englewood Cliffs, NJ
- Genre: Jazz
- Length: 47:39
- Label: Milestone; MCD-9259-2
- Producer: Bob Porter

Hank Crawford chronology
| Blues Groove (1995) | Tight (1996) | Road Tested (1997) |

Tight is an album by saxophonist Hank Crawford recorded in 1996 and released on the Milestone label.

== Reception ==
Professional ratings
Review scores
| Source | Rating |
|---|---|
| Allmusic | 3/5 stars |
| The Penguin Guide to Jazz Recordings | 2/4 stars |

Allmusic's Michael G. Nastos called it: "a clear effort to sell some records" and noted "this commercially inclined recording is all right, not his most essential, but likable in many more spots than not". In JazzTimes, Ron Welburn wrote "Mr. Crawford is immersed in his grooves. Pyrotechnical wails are not associated with his recordings ... Consistency of a groove, however, remains his abiding principle, so much that Hank Crawford seems incapable of spoiling a good thing". On All About Jazz, Douglas Payne stated "Here's a most pleasant surprise from the familiar tenor of Hank Crawford - a terrific collection of familiar soul/jazz tunes worthy of his deeply soulful skills and abundant talent ... a welcome return of one of the most revered sounds in soulful jazz".

== Track listing ==
All compositions by Hank Crawford except where noted

1. "I Had a Dream" (Hubert Laws) – 7:23
2. "If It's the Last Thing I Do" (Saul Chaplin, Sammy Cahn) – 4:56
3. "Breezin'" (Bobby Womack) – 5:56
4. "Don't Start Nuttin', Won't Be Nuttin'" (Melvin Sparks) – 7:47
5. "Mona Lisa" (Ray Evans, Jay Livingston) – 3:29
6. "Little Sunflower" (Freddie Hubbard) – 7:18
7. "Everything I Have Is Yours" (Burton Lane, Harold Adamson) – 6:13
8. "Manhattan Blues" (Hank Crawford) – 4:37

== Personnel ==
- Hank Crawford – alto saxophone, arranger
- Earl Gardner, Alan Rubin – trumpet
- David Newman – tenor saxophone, flute
- Howard Johnson – baritone saxophone
- Danny Mixon – piano, organ
- Melvin Sparks – guitar
- Stanley Banks - bass
- Idris Muhammad − drums
