= McGriff Avenue =

Studio album by Jimmy McGriff
- Released: October 29, 2002
- Recorded: October 22 and 23, 2001
- Studio: Van Gelder Studio, Englewood Cliffs, NJ
- Genre: Jazz
- Length: 59:20
- Label: Milestone; MCD-9325-2
- Producer: Bob Porter

Jimmy McGriff chronology
Feelin' It (2001)	McGriff Avenue (2002)

McGriff Avenue is an album by organist Jimmy McGriff recorded in 2001 and released on the Milestone label the following year.

== Reception ==
Professional ratings
Review scores
Source	Rating
Allmusic	4/5 stars
The Penguin Guide to Jazz Recordings	3/4 stars

Allmusic's Richard S. Ginell said: "McGriff Avenue cruises easily through mostly blues country, highlighted by a few inspired remakes of early McGriff hits ... Though this CD doesn't have the ecstatic super-grooves of some of McGriff's earlier milestones, it still keeps the customers satisfied". On All About Jazz, Joel Roberts noted "While no new ground is broken here, McGriff and company evoke the down home mood of the classic soul jazz years. It ain't quite as greasy as the old days, but it still tastes good". In JazzTimes, Owen Cordle wrote "The organist, an economical player, comes from the slow-burn school. Forget theatrics and fireworks-he’s the type who paces his performances for a steady payoff of good grooves and soulful messages. Everyone delivers heartfelt solos throughout the album and, as always, the dance floor remains open during the set".

== Track listing ==
All compositions by Rodney Jones except where noted

1. "All About My Girl" (Jimmy McGriff) – 7:50
2. "McGriff Avenue" – 7:35
3. "Soul Street" (Jimmy Forrest) – 10:50
4. "The Answer Is in the Blues" – 8:13
5. "The Great Unknown" (McGriff, Ronnie Cuber) – 6:45
6. "Dissertation on the Blues" – 8:35
7. "The Worm" (McGriff, Sonny Lester, Fats Theus) – 6:30
8. "America the Beautiful" (Samuel A. Ward, Katharine Lee Bates) – 3:02

== Personnel ==
- Jimmy McGriff – Hammond X-B3 organ
- Gordon Beadle, Bill Easley – tenor saxophone
- Ronnie Cuber – baritone saxophone
- Rodney Jones (tracks 2, 4 & 6), Melvin Sparks-Hassan (tracks 1, 3, 5, 7 & 8) – guitar
- Wilbur Bascomb – bass
- Bernard Purdie (tracks 1, 3, 5, 7 & 8), Don Williams (tracks 2, 4 & 6) − drums
