= Road Tested (Hank Crawford and Jimmy McGriff album) =

Studio album by Hank Crawford and Jimmy McGriff
- Released: 1997
- Recorded: June 30 & July 1, 1997
- Studio: Van Gelder Studio, Englewood Cliffs, NJ
- Genre: Jazz
- Length: 60:30
- Label: Milestone; MCD-9274-2
- Producer: Bob Porter

Hank Crawford chronology
Tight (1996)	Road Tested (1997)	After Dark (1998)

Jimmy McGriff chronology
The Dream Team (1996)	Road Tested (1997)	Straight Up (1998)

Road Tested is an album by saxophonist Hank Crawford and organist Jimmy McGriff, recorded in 1997 and released on the Milestone label.

== Reception ==
Professional ratings
Review scores
Source	Rating
AllMusic	4/5 stars
The Penguin Guide to Jazz Recordings	2.5/4 stars

AllMusic's Richard S. Ginell said: "You know what to expect by now -- hardass, down-home, blues-drenched organ trio-plus-sax grooving -- but this is a really potent gusher of that genre ... it's amazing and gratifying that bluesicians are still allowed to make records this way". On All About Jazz, Douglas Payne stated that "Road Tested, the seventh pairing under both their names, is exactly what you'd expect from these two: the tried and trues of funk and blues ... Road Tested offers some reliably soulful sounds and gotcha-groove for both fatback fans and acid-jazzers".

== Track listing ==
1. "Peanuts" (Wayne Boyd) – 6:19
2. "I Only Have Eyes for You" (Harry Warren, Al Dubin) – 4:52
3. "Happy Feet" (Hank Crawford) – 5:30
4. "For Sentimental Reasons" (William Best, Deek Watson) – 5:21
5. "Caravan" (Juan Tizol, Duke Ellington, Irving Mills) – 9:01
6. "Road Tested" (Jimmy McGriff) – 5:48
7. "Hope That We Can Be Together Soon" (Kenny Gamble, Leon Huff) – 5:54
8. "Mr. P.C." (John Coltrane) – 3:35
9. "Summertime" (George Gershwin, Ira Gershwin, DuBose Heyward) – 5:38
10. "A Little Bit South of East St. Louis" (Crawford, McGriff) – 8:53

== Personnel ==
- Hank Crawford – alto saxophone
- Jimmy McGriff – Hammond X-B3 organ
- Wayne Boyd – guitar
- Bernard Purdie − drums
