= Tico Rico =

Album by Hank Crawford

Studio album by Hank Crawford
- Released: 1977
- Genre: Funk, jazz
- Label: Kudu

Professional ratings
Review scores
Source	Rating
AllMusic	2.5/5 stars

Tico Rico is a 1977 jazz/funk album by saxophonist Hank Crawford. It was produced by Creed Taylor. The music featured CTI recording artists including Eric Gale, Steve Gadd, Jon Faddis and Randy Brecker. It appeared at number 31 on Billboard Magazine's Best Selling Jazz LPs on October 8, 1977 and peaked at number 28.

== Track listing ==
1. "Tico Rico" (David Matthews) – 4:50
2. "Teach Me Tonight" (De Paul, Cahn) – 4:18.
3. "Lady Soul" (Matthews) – 4:45
4. "Lullaby Of Love" (Floyd, Williams) – 4:46
5. "I've Just Seen A Face" (Lennon, McCartney) – 6:30
6. "Lament" (Matthews) – 5:06
7. "Funky Rooster" (Matthews) – 5:54

== Personnel ==
- Gary King – bass
- Steve Gadd – drums
- Jeremy Steig – flute
- Eric Gale – guitar
- Clifford Carter – keyboards
- David Matthews – piano
- Sue Evans – percussion
- Nicky Marrero – congas
- Hank Crawford – alto saxophone
- Michael Brecker – tenor saxophone
- Jon Faddis – trumpet
- Randy Brecker – trumpet

=== Additional musicians ===
- Alan Shulman, Charles McCracken – cello
- Emanuel Vardi, Lamar Alsop – viola
- Charles Libove, David Nadien, Emanuel Green, Marvin Morgenstern, Matthew Raimondi, Max Ellen, Max Pollikoff, Paul Gershman – violin
- Raymond Simpson, Zachary Sanders – backing vocals
- Frank Floyd – backing vocals, solo vocal

=== Technical personnel ===
- Creed Taylor – producer
- David Palmer – mixing engineer
- Joe Jorgensen – overdubbing engineer
- Don Hahn – recording engineer
- Carole Kowalchuk, Sib Chalawick – album art
- White Gate – photography
