= Hank Crawford =

American R&B and jazz saxophonist and songwriter (1934–2009)

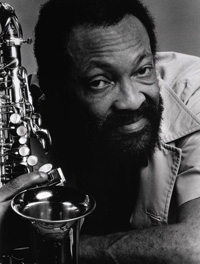

Background information
- Born: Bennie Ross Crawford Jr. December 21, 1934; Memphis, Tennessee, U.S.
- Died: January 29, 2009 (aged 74) Memphis, Tennessee, U.S.
- Genres: R&B; hard bop; jazz-funk; soul jazz
- Occupations: Musician; composer
- Instruments: Alto saxophone; baritone saxophone; piano
- Years active: 1958–2009
- Labels: Milestone; Atlantic

Bennie Ross "Hank" Crawford Jr. (December 21, 1934 – January 29, 2009) was an American alto saxophonist, pianist, arranger, and songwriter whose genres included R&B, hard bop, jazz-funk, and soul jazz. Crawford was musical director for Ray Charles before embarking on a solo career, releasing many well-regarded albums for labels such as Atlantic, CTI, and Milestone.

== Early life ==
Crawford was born in Memphis, Tennessee, United States. He began formal piano studies at the age of nine and was soon playing for his church choir. His father had brought an alto saxophone home from the service, and when Hank entered Manassas High School, he took it up in order to join the band. He credits Charlie Parker, Louis Jordan, Earl Bostic, and Johnny Hodges as early influences.

== Career ==
Crawford appears on an early 1952 Memphis recording for B. B. King, with a band including Ben Branch and Ike Turner.

In 1958, Crawford attended Tennessee State University in Nashville, Tennessee. While there, he majored in music, studying theory and composition, as well as playing alto and baritone saxophones in the Tennessee State Jazz Collegians. He also led his own rock 'n' roll quartet: "Little Hank and the Rhythm Kings". His bandmates all thought he looked and sounded just like Hank O'Day, a local saxophonist, which earned him the nickname "Hank". This is when Crawford met Ray Charles, who hired Crawford originally as a baritone saxophonist. Crawford switched to alto in 1959 and remained with Charles's band, serving as its musical director until 1963.

When Crawford left Ray Charles in 1963 to form his own septet, he had already established himself through several albums for Atlantic Records. From 1960 until 1970, he recorded twelve LPs for the label, many while balancing his earlier duties as Ray's director. He released such pre-crossover hits as "Misty", "The Peeper", "Whispering Grass", and "Shake-A-Plenty".

He also did musical arrangement for Etta James and Lou Rawls, among others. Crawford recorded "Wild Flower" in 1973, and in 1978, worked with Cornell Dupree on the album Shadow Dancing. Much of his career was in R&B, but in the 1970s, he had several successful jazz albums, with I Hear a Symphony reaching no. 11 on Billboard's jazz albums chart and no. 159 for pop albums.

David Sanborn has cited Crawford as being one of his primary influences. Crawford is recognized by saxophonists as having a particularly unique and pleasing sound. In 1981, he featured with fellow saxophonists David "Fathead" Newman and Ronnie Cuber on B. B. King's There Must Be a Better World Somewhere.

In 1983, he traded to Milestone Records as a premier arranger, soloist, and composer, writing for small bands, including guitarist Melvin Sparks, organist Jimmy McGriff, and Dr. John. In 1986, Crawford began working with soul-jazz organist Jimmy McGriff. They recorded five co-leader dates for Milestone: Soul Survivors, Steppin' Up, On the Blue Side, Road Tested, and Crunch Time, as well as two dates for Telarc Records: Right Turn on Blue and Blues Groove. The two toured together extensively.

The 21st century found Crawford shifting gears and pursuing more a mainstream jazz set with his 2000 release The World of Hank Crawford. Though its track listing includes the music of jazz composers like Cole Porter, Duke Ellington, and Tadd Dameron, he delivers a soul sound that is his trademark. The following year saw the release of The Best of Hank Crawford and Jimmy McGriff.

== Death ==
Crawford died on January 29, 2009, aged 74, at his home in Memphis, Tennessee, due to complications arising from an earlier stroke.

== Discography ==
=== As leader/co-leader ===
Release year	Title	Label	Personnel/Notes
1961	More Soul	Atlantic	
1962	The Soul Clinic	Atlantic	
1962	From the Heart	Atlantic	
1963	Soul of the Ballad	Atlantic	
1964	True Blue	Atlantic	
1965	Dig These Blues	Atlantic	
1966	After Hours	Atlantic	
1967	Mr. Blues	Atlantic	
1968	Double Cross	Atlantic	
1969	Mr. Blues Plays Lady Soul	Atlantic	
1970	The Best of Hank Crawford	Atlantic	Compilation
1971	It's a Funky Thing to Do	Cotillion/Atlantic	
1972	Help Me Make It Through the Night	Kudu/CTI	
1972	We Got a Good Thing Going	Kudu	
1973	Wildflower	Kudu	
1974	Don't You Worry 'bout a Thing	Kudu	
1975	I Hear a Symphony	Kudu	
1976	Hank Crawford's Back	Kudu	
1977	Tico Rico	Kudu	
1978	Cajun Sunrise	Kudu	
1980	Centerpiece	Buddah	With Calvin Newborn
1982	Midnight Ramble	Milestone	
1983	Indigo Blue	Milestone	
1984	Down on the Deuce	Milestone	
1985	Roadhouse Symphony	Milestone	
1986	Soul Survivors	Milestone	With Jimmy McGriff
1986	Mr. Chips	Milestone	
1987	Steppin' Up	Milestone	With Jimmy McGriff
1989	Night Beat	Milestone	
1989	On the Blue Side	Milestone	With Jimmy McGriff
1990	Groove Master	Milestone	
1990	Bossa International	Milestone	With Richie Cole
1991	Portrait	Milestone	With Johnny "Hammond" Smith
1993	South Central	Milestone	
1994	Right Turn on Blue	Telarc	With Jimmy McGriff
1996	Blues Groove	Telarc	With Jimmy McGriff
1996	Tight	Milestone	
1997	Road Tested	Milestone	With Jimmy McGriff
1998	After Dark	Milestone	
1999	Crunch Time	Milestone	With Jimmy McGriff
2000	The World of Hank Crawford	Milestone	
2001	The Best of Hank Crawford & Jimmy McGriff	Milestone	Compilation

=== As sideman ===
With Ray Charles

- Ray Charles at Newport (Atlantic, 1958)
- What'd I Say (Atlantic, 1959)
- Ray Charles in Person (Atlantic, 1959)
- Modern Sounds in Country and Western Music (ABC-Paramount, 1962)

With B. B. King

- There Must Be a Better World Somewhere (MCA, 1981)
- Let the Good Times Roll (MCA, 1999)

With David "Fathead" Newman

- Fathead Comes On (Atlantic, 1962)
- Still Hard Times (Muse, 1982)
- Fire! Live at the Village Vanguard (Atlantic, 1989)

With others

- Eric Clapton, Journeyman (Warner Bros., 1989)
- Cornell Dupree, Shadow Dancing (Versatile, 1978)
- Grant Green, Easy (Versatile, 1978)
- Johnny "Hammond" Smith, Breakout (Kudu/CTI, 1971)
- Etta James, The Right Time (Elektra, 1992)
- Shirley Scott, Shirley Scott & the Soul Saxes (Atlantic, 1969)
- Janis Siegel, The Tender Trap (Monarch, 1999)
