= Mainstream jazz =

Genre of jazz music

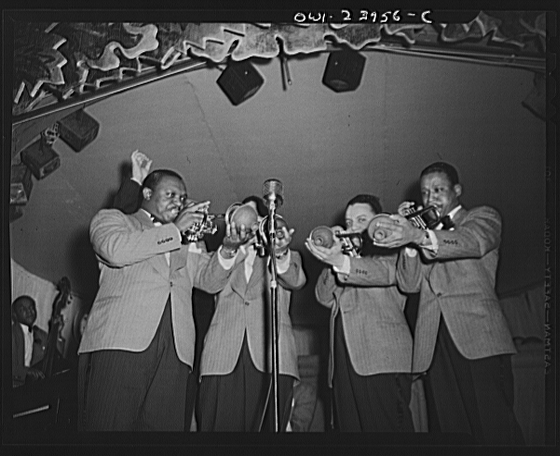
Duke Ellington Orchestra

Mainstream jazz is a term coined in the 1950s by music journalist Stanley Dance, who considered anything within the popular jazz of the Swing Era "mainstream", and did not include the bebop style.

== Jazz in the mainstream ==
After Dance defined mainstream jazz in the 1950s, the definition changed with the evolution and progression of jazz music. What was mainstream then would not be considered mainstream now. In a general sense, mainstream jazz can be considered what was most popular at the time: For example, during the Swing era, swing and big band music were in their prime and what target audiences were looking for. Although bebop was introduced into jazz during that time, audiences had not developed an ear for it.

=== Mainstream jazz musicians ===
The jazz musicians listed below were either considered "mainstream" musicians, or were influenced by mainstream musicians.

==== Swing era ====
- Duke Ellington was an important influence on mainstream jazz; his music during the swing era was not known for breaking rules.
- Coleman Hawkins made significant contributions to big band music prior to introducing bebop to his style.
- Johnny Hodges was a member of Duke Ellington's Orchestra and became a familiar voice within the orchestra itself.
- Benny Carter was a major influence on the big band style.
- Roy Eldridge has been named one of the most influential jazz musicians both within the swing era and to the development of bebop. His trumpet playing was influenced by Louis Armstrong.

== Mainstream jazz in popular culture ==
In the 1950s and 1960s, jazz was a mainstream part of pop culture. Jazz music was on the radio and Hollywood frequently incorporated jazz in television and films.
