= Bob Porter (music producer) =

American record producer (1940–2021)

Robert Porter (June 20, 1940 – April 10, 2021) was an American record producer, discographer, writer, and radio presenter. He was responsible for reissuing many classic blues and jazz recordings, and in 2009 was inducted into the Blues Hall of Fame.

Bob Porter was born in Wellesley, Massachusetts. From the 1960s, he produced over 200 albums of jazz and blues music, first for Prestige Records where he also wrote liner notes, in the 1960s, then as reissue producer for Savoy Records (1975–1980), and then Atlantic Records (1986–1991). He subsequently worked for many other record labels. It was said that "The result of his painstaking efforts is the restoration of much of the 20th century's most indelible music, now preserved for future generations and sounding better than ever before."

In 1981, he started to broadcast Portraits In Blue, a syndicated radio program covering blues, R&B and soul music, which he launched at WBGO in Newark, New Jersey. He received the 1986 W. C. Handy Award. He had five Grammy Award nominations, winning in 1980 for his liner notes for The Complete Charlie Parker on Savoy and in 1986 as reissue producer for Atlantic Rhythm & Blues. He was a member of the nominating committee of the Rock and Roll Hall of Fame. He was a master of ceremonies for the Chicago Blues Festival from 1990.

He wrote for magazines such as DownBeat and Cash Box, and wrote liner notes for more than three hundred albums of jazz and blues. He also contributed expertise to organizations including the National Academy of Recording Arts and Sciences.

Bob Porter died of complications from esophageal cancer, at his home in Northvale, New Jersey, on April 10, 2021.
