= Pete Turner (photographer) =

American photographer (1934–2017)

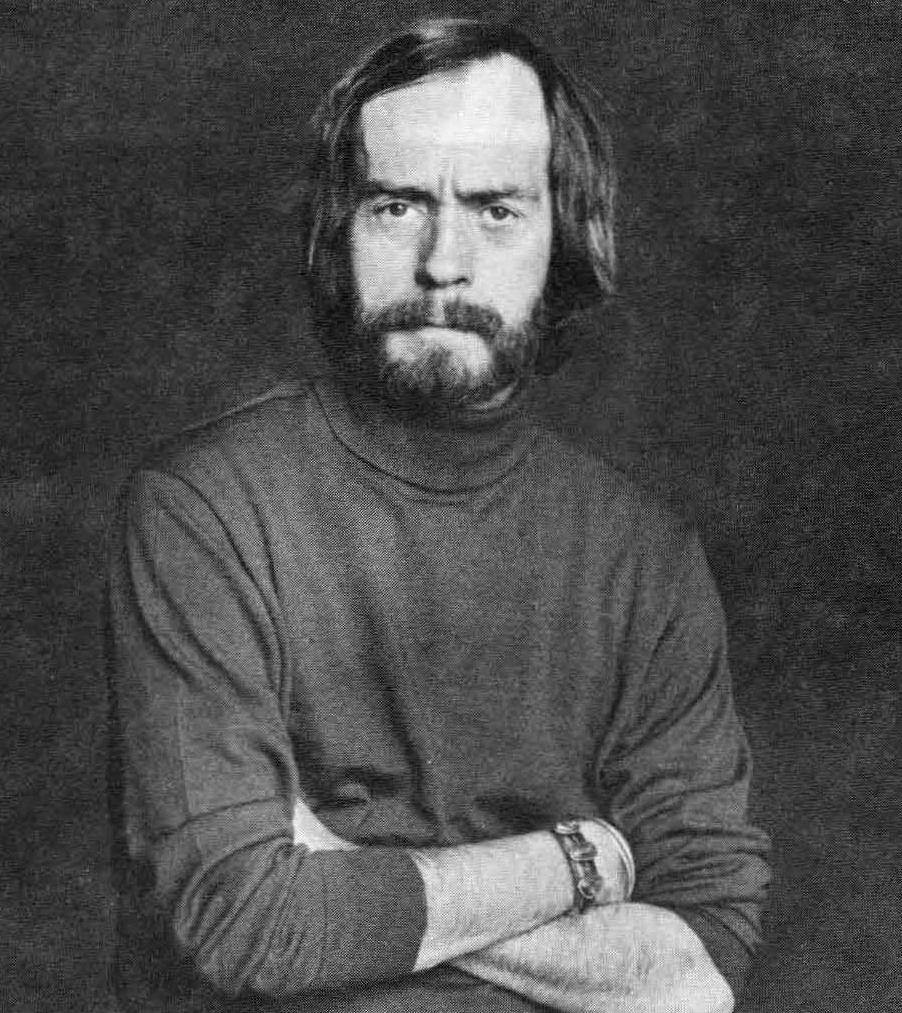
- Turner circa 1980
- Born: Donald Peter Turner; May 30, 1934; Albany, New York, U.S.
- Died: September 18, 2017 (aged 83); Wainscott, New York, U.S.
- Education: Rochester Institute of Technology
- Occupation: Photographer
- Spouse: Reine Angeli (m. 1965–2017)
- Children: 1

Donald Peter Turner (May 30, 1934 – September 18, 2017) was an American photographer.

In 1986, Turner published his first monograph, Pete Turner Photographs (Abrams). His second book, Pete Turner African Journey (Graphis Inc., 2001), documents Turner's many adventures in Africa, beginning with his trek in 1959 from Cape Town to Cairo with Wally Byam's famous Airstream caravan. The Color of Jazz (Rizzoli, 2006) is a comprehensive collection of his provocative album covers for CTI Records among many others.

== Life and work ==
Critic A. D. Coleman described the work of Turner as having "A dramatist's sense of event, intense and saturated coloration, and a distinct if indescribable otherness are omnipresent in Turner's images".

He graduated from the Rochester Institute of Technology in 1956 along with classmates Bruce Davidson and Jerry Uelsmann.

Photo District News voted him as one of the 20 most influential photographers of all time and in 1981 the American Society of Media Photographers (ASMP) awarded him its Outstanding Achievement in Photography honor.

His photographs are in the permanent collections of many major museums, including the Maison Européenne de la Photographie (MEP), the Tokyo Metropolitan Museum of Photography and International Center of Photography (ICP) in New York. The George Eastman House in Rochester is the depository of Turner's life's work and where his retrospective exhibition, Pete Turner: Empowered by Color, opened in 2007.

Turner died September 18, 2017, at his home on Long Island, New York.

== Contributions to LP covers ==
- The Sound of New York, Kenyon Hopkins – ABC Paramount, 1959
- Lonelyville 'The Nervous Beat', The Creed Taylor Orchestra – ABC Paramount, 1959
- The Best of the Barrack Ballads, The Creed Taylor Orchestra – ABC Paramount, 1959
- The Blues and the Abstract Truth, Oliver Nelson – Impulse!, 1961
- Motion, Lee Konitz – Verve, 1961
- Perceptions, Dizzy Gillespie – Verve, 1961
- Focus, Stan Getz – Verve, 1961
- In a Latin Bag, Cal Tjader – Verve, 1961
- Live at the Village Vanguard, John Coltrane – Impulse!, 1962
- The Quintessence, Quincy Jones – Impulse!, 1962
- Further Definitions, Benny Carter – Impulse!, 1962
- Statements, Milt Jackson – Impulse!, 1962
- Count Basie and the Kansas City 7, Count Basie – Impulse!, 1962
- All the Sad Young Men, Anita O'Day – Verve, 1962
- Saturday Night/Sunday Night, Cal Tjader – Verve, 1962
- Pike's Peak, The Dave Pike Quartet – Epic, 1962
- Coltrane, John Coltrane – Impulse!, 1962
- Night Train Oscar Peterson – Verve, 1963
- Wave, Antônio Carlos Jobim – CTI, 1967
- Soft Samba Strings, Gary McFarland – Verve, 1967
- A Day in the Life, Wes Montgomery – A&M, 1967
- Trust in Me, Soul Flutes – A&M/CTI, 1967
- We and the Sea, Tamba 4 – A&M/CTI, 1968
- Samba Blim, Tamba 4 – A&M/CTI, 1968
- Down Here on the Ground, Wes Montgomery – A&M/CTI, 1968
- Road Song, Wes Montgomery – A&M/CTI, 1968
- Soul Machine, Richard Barbary – A&M/CTI, 1968
- Have You Meet Miss Jones, Artie Butler – A&M/CTI, 1968
- Glory of Love, Herbie Mann – A&M/CTI, 1968
- You, Baby, Nat Adderley – A&M/CTI, 1968
- Shape of Things to Come, George Benson – A&M/CTI, 1968
- When It Was Done – Walter Wanderley – A&M/CTI, 1968
- Moondreams – Walter Wanderley – A&M/CTI, 1969
- Summertime, Paul Desmond – A&M/CTI, 1968
- Betwixt & Between, J.J. Johnson & Kai Winding – A&M/CTI, 1969
- Walking In Space, Quincy Jones – A&M/CTI, 1969
- Tell It Like It Is, George Benson – A&M/CTI, 1969
- Calling Out Loud, Nat Adderley – A&M/CTI, 1969
- Courage, Milton Nascimento – A&M/CTI, 1969
- From The Hot Afternoon, Paul Desmond – A&M/CTI, 1969
- Gula Matari, Quincy Jones – A&M/CTI, 1970
- Tide, Antônio Carlos Jobim – A&M/CTI, 1970
- Starbones, J.J. Johnson & Kai Winding – A&M/CTI, 1970
- Sugar, Stanley Turrentine – CTI, 1970
- Crying Song, Hubert Laws – CTI, 1970
- Stone Flower, Antônio Carlos Jobim – CTI, 1970
- Joe Farrell Quartet, Joe Farrell – CTI, 1970
- Black Out, Fats Theus – CTI, 1970
- Montreux II, Bill Evans – CTI, 1970
- California Concert, CTI All Stars – CTI, 1971
- Straight Life, Freddie Hubbard – CTI, 1971
- Beyond the Blue Horizon, George Benson – CTI, 1971
- Salt Song, Stanley Turrentine – CTI, 1971
- First Light, Freddie Hubbard – CTI, 1971
- Outback, Joe Farrell – CTI, 1971
- God Bless The Child, Kenny Burrell – CTI, 1971
- Gilberto with Turrentine, Astrud Gilberto – CTI, 1971
- Killer, Alice Cooper – Warner Bros., 1971
- Shebaba, Bola Sete – Fantasy, 1971
- Afro-Classic, Hubert Laws – CTI, 1972
- White Rabbit, George Benson – CTI, 1972
- Free, Airto Moreira – CTI, 1972
- All the King's Horses, Grover Washington, Jr. – Kudu, 1972
- Soul Story, Charles Earland – Prestige, 1972
- Morning Star, Hubert Laws – CTI, 1972
- Time & Love, Jackie & Roy – CTI, 1972
- Sky Dive, Freddie Hubbard – CTI, 1972
- Prelude, Deodato – CTI, 1973
- Sunflower, Milt Jackson – CTI, 1973
- Fingers, Airto Moreira – CTI, 1973
- Blue Moses, Randy Weston – CTI, 1973
- Blues Farm, Ron Carter – CTI, 1973
- Keep Your Soul Together, Freddie Hubbard – CTI, 1973
- Giant Box, Don Sebesky – CTI, 1973
- Upon This Rock, Joe Farrell – CTI, 1974
- Goodbye, Milt Jackson – CTI, 1974
- Higher Ground, Johnny Hammond – Kudu, 1974
- Skylark, Paul Desmond – CTI, 1974
- Rambler, Gabor Szabo – CTI, 1974
- She Was Too Good To Me, Chet Baker – CTI, 1974
- Bad Benson, George Benson – CTI, 1974
- A Wilder Alias, Jackie & Roy – CTI, 1974
- Olinga, Milt Jackson – CTI, 1974
- Gambler's Life, Johnny Hammond – Salvation, 1974
- Concierto, Jim Hall – CTI, 1975
- Canned Funk, Joe Farrell – CTI, 1975
- I Hear A Symphony, Hank Crawford – Kudu, 1975
- Good King Bad, George Benson – CTI, 1976
- Black Widow, Lalo Schifrin – CTI, 1976
- The San Francisco Concert, Hubert Laws – CTI, 1977
- Greatest Hits, Steely Dan – ABC, 1978
- Space, George Benson – CTI, 1978
- Pulsion, Jacques Loussier – CBS, 1979
- Night Passage, Weather Report – CBS, 1980
- Silk, Fuse One – CTI, 1981
- Studio Trieste, Jim Hall/Chet Baker/Hubert Laws – CTI, 1982
- N.Y. Connection, David Matthews – Electric Bird, 1982
- Gershwin Carmichael Cats, Roland Hanna – CTI, 1983
- In My Life, Patti Austin – CTI, 1983
- Red On Red, Claudio Roditi – CTI, 1984
- Live at Felt Forum, Deodato – CTI/CBS, 1988
- Rhythmstick, Dizzy Gillespie and CTI Records All-Stars – CTI, 1990
- Song of the Sun, Jim Beard – CTI, 1991
- We Are Family '93, Sister Sledge – Atlantic, 1993
- Grooves In The Temple, Jorge Pescara – JSR, 2005
- Live at Montreux 2009, CTI All Stars – CTI, 2010
- Saga, Rodrigo Lima – JSR, 2014
