= Herbie Hancock appearances as sideman or guest artist =

This page lists appearances of American jazz musician Herbie Hancock as a sideman in recordings of other artists (that includes also the year of recordings if the albums were released at least two years later).

== Table of albums ==
Album	Year	Artist	Status	References
Royal Flush	1961	Donald Byrd	Composer, band member, piano	
Out of this World	1961	Donald Byrd Pepper Adams Quintet	Band member, piano	
Free Form	1962	Donald Byrd	Band member, piano	
Snap Your Fingers	1962	Al Grey	Piano	
Hub-Tones	1962	Freddie Hubbard	Guest artist, piano	
Domino	1962	Roland Kirk	Guest artist, piano	
A New Perspective	1963	Donald Byrd	Guest artist, piano	
Vertigo	1963	Jackie McLean	Guest artist, piano	
Seven Steps to Heaven	1963	Miles Davis	Guest artist, main personnel, piano	
Swamp Seed	1963	Jimmy Heath	Piano	
Una Mas	1963	Kenny Dorham	Guest artist, piano	
Feelin' the Spirit	1963	Grant Green	Guest artist, main personnel, piano	
No Room for Squares	1963	Hank Mobley	Piano	
In Europe	1964	Miles Davis	Main personnel, piano	
Four & More	1964	Miles Davis	Guest artist, main personnel, piano	
It's Time	1964	Jackie McLean	Guest artist, main personnel, piano	
Some Other Stuff	1964	Grachan Moncur III	Guest artist, piano	
Search for the New Land	1964	Lee Morgan	Guest artist, piano	
All the Things You Are (1963-1964)	1964	Sonny Rollins	Guest artist, piano	
Speak No Evil	1964	Wayne Shorter	Guest artist, main personnel, piano	
In Memory Of	1964	Stanley Turrentine	Piano	
Life Time	1964	Tony Williams	Guest artist, piano	
Bob Brookmeyer and Friends	1965	Bob Brookmeyer	Guest artist, piano	
Up with Donald Byrd	1965	Donald Byrd	Composer, piano	
My Funny Valentine: Miles Davis in Concert	1965	Miles Davis	Guest artist, main personnel, piano	
E.S.P.	1965	Miles Davis	Composer, guest artist, piano	
Components	1965	Bobby Hutcherson	Guest artist, organ, piano	
The Turnaround!	1965	Hank Mobley	Guest artist, piano	
Cornbread	1965	Lee Morgan	Guest artist, piano	
Contours	1965	Sam Rivers	Guest artist, piano	
In the Beginning	1965	Woody Shaw		
The All Seeing Eye	1965	Wayne Shorter	Guest artist, piano	
Joyride	1965	Stanley Turrentine	Guest artist, piano	
Spring	1965	Tony Williams	Guest artist, piano	
Voices	1966	Stan Getz	Piano	
Happenings	1966	Bobby Hutcherson	Composer, guest artist, piano	
Dirty Dog	1966	Kai Winding	Composer, piano	
Goin' Out of My Head	1966	Wes Montgomery	Guest artist, piano	
California Dreaming	1966	Wes Montgomery	Guest artist, piano	
Jazz for the Jet Set	1966	Dave Pike	Composer, organ	
Out of the Storm	1966	Ed Thigpen	piano	
Adam's Apple	1966	Wayne Shorter	Composer, piano	
Miles Smiles	1967	Miles Davis	Guest artist, piano	
Sorcerer	1967	Miles Davis	Composer, guest artist, keyboards, piano	
A Day in the Life	1967	Wes Montgomery	Guest artist, piano	
Schizophrenia	1967	Wayne Shorter	Guest artist, piano	
Hip Vibrations	1967	Cal Tjader	Piano	
Virgo Vibes	1967	Roy Ayers	Guest artist, piano (listed as Ronnie Clark)	
Stoned Soul Picnic	1968	Roy Ayers	Piano	
Shape of Things to Come	1968	George Benson	Guest artist, main personnel, piano	
Giblet Gravy	1968	George Benson	Guest artist, piano	
Blues - The Common Ground	1968	Kenny Burrell	Guest artist, piano	
Nefertiti	1968	Miles Davis	Composer, guest artist, piano, electric piano	
Miles in the Sky	1968	Miles Davis	Guest artist, piano, electric piano	
Filles de Kilimanjaro	1968	Miles Davis	Guest artist, electric piano	
What the World Needs Now: Stan Getz Plays Burt Bacharach and Hal David	1968	Stan Getz	Guest artist, piano	
Israel	1968	J. J. Johnson and Kai Winding		
Down Here on the Ground	1968	Wes Montgomery	Guest artist, piano	
Road Song	1968	Wes Montgomery	Piano	
In a Silent Way	1969	Miles Davis	Guest artist, electric piano	
Uptown Conversation	1969	Ron Carter	piano, electric piano	
Summertime	1969	Paul Desmond	Piano	
Daddy Bug	1969	Roy Ayers	Piano	
Aquarius	1969	Charlie Byrd	Keyboards	
Goin' West	1969	Grant Green	Guest artist, piano Recorded in 1962	
Kawaida	1969	Albert "Tootie" Heath	Piano	
Power to the People	1969	Joe Henderson	Guest artist, piano, electric piano	
Stonebone	1969	J. J. Johnson and Kai Winding		
Courage	1969	Milton Nascimento	Guest artist, main personnel, piano	
Paper Man	1969	Charles Tolliver	Piano	
Round Trip	1969	Phil Woods	Piano	
The Other Side of Abbey Road	1970	George Benson	Guest artist, harpsichord, organ, piano	
Bridge Over Troubled Water	1970	Paul Desmond	Electric piano	
Red Clay	1970	Freddie Hubbard	Featured artist, guest artist, piano	
Betwixt & Between	1970	J. J. Johnson and Kai Winding		
Gula Matari	1970	Quincy Jones	Keyboards	
Infinite Search	1970	Miroslav Vitous	Guest artist, keyboards, electric piano	
A Tribute to Jack Johnson	1971	Miles Davis	Guest artist, keyboards, main personnel, organ	
Live-Evil	1971	Miles Davis	Guest artist, keyboards, electric piano	
Straight Life	1971	Freddie Hubbard	Guest artist, piano	
First Light	1971	Freddie Hubbard	Guest artist, Rhodes	
He Who Lives in Many Places	1971	Terry Plumeri		
White Rabbit	1972	George Benson	Guest artist, keyboards, electric piano	
On the Corner	1972	Miles Davis	Fender Rhodes, guest artist, keyboards, synthesizer	
Moon Germs	1972	Joe Farrell	Guest artist, piano	
Penny Arcade	1973	Joe Farrell	Piano, electric piano	
Realization	1973	Eddie Henderson	Composer, Keyboards	
Inside Out	1973	Eddie Henderson	Keyboards	
In Concert	1973	Freddie Hubbard with Stanley Turrentine	Composer, guest artist, piano	
In Concert Volume II	1973	Freddie Hubbard with Stanley Turrentine	Composer, guest artist, piano	
Sunflower	1973	Milt Jackson	Guest artist, piano	
Big Fun	1974	Miles Davis	Guest artist, electric piano Recorded in 1969	
Get Up with It	1974	Miles Davis	Clavinet, guest artist, keyboards	
Upon This Rock	1974	Joe Farrell		
Body Heat	1974	Quincy Jones	Piano, electric piano, synthesizer	
The Jewel in the Lotus	1974	Bennie Maupin	Main personnel, piano, electric piano, primary artist	
Native Dancer	1974	Wayne Shorter	Composer, guest artist, keyboards, piano	
Love Me by Name	1975	Lesley Gore	Keyboards, primary artist	
Water Babies	1976	Miles Davis	Guest artist, keyboards, piano, electric piano, primary artist, synthesizer, vocals Recorded in 1968	
Milton (Raça)	1976	Milton Nascimento	Guest artist, piano	
Jaco Pastorius	1976	Jaco Pastorius	Clavinet, composer, Fender Rhodes, guest artist, keyboards, liner notes, piano, electric piano	
Magical Shepherd	1976	Miroslav Vitous	Arp Odyssey, clavinet, Fender Rhodes, keyboards, electric piano, synthesizer, synthesizer strings	
Songs in the Key of Life	1976	Stevie Wonder	Guest artist, handclapping, keyboards	
Night Dancing	1978	Joe Farrell	Piano, electric piano	
Sounds...and Stuff Like That!!	1978	Quincy Jones	Composer, keyboards, piano, electric piano	
Mahal	1978	Eddie Henderson	Composer, keyboards, electric piano	
The Procrastinator	1978	Lee Morgan	Guest artist, piano Recorded in 1967	
The Joy of Flying	1978	Tony Williams	Guest artist on two tracks, piano, electric piano, Minimoog, Oberheim synthesizer, Prophet 5	
1 + 3	1978	Ron Carter	Piano; Live in Japan	
Chant	1979	Donald Byrd	Piano; Recorded in 1961	
Circle in the Round	1979	Miles Davis	Main personnel, piano, electric piano Recorded in 1968	
Oblique	1979	Bobby Hutcherson	Composer, guest artist, piano Recorded in 1967	
Butterfly	1979	Kimiko Kasai	Composer, co-producer, main personnel, electric piano, keyboards, clavinet, vocoder	
Mingus	1979	Joni Mitchell	Main personnel, electric piano	
Step Lightly	1980	Blue Mitchell	Piano; Recorded in 1963	
The Swing of Delight	1980	Carlos Santana	Main personnel, keyboards, piano	
Et Cetera	1980	Wayne Shorter	Guest artist, piano Recorded in 1965	
Inside Story	1981	Prince Lasha	Guest artist, piano Recorded in 1965	
Directions	1981	Miles Davis	Piano, electric piano Recorded in 1967	
The Dude	1981	Quincy Jones	Guest artist, piano, electric piano	
What Cha' Gonna Do for Me	1981	Chaka Khan	Keyboards, Clavitar, Oberheim synthesizer, soloist, bells, breakdown	
By All Means	1981	Alphonse Mouzon	Fender Rhodes, keyboards, piano, synthesizer, vocals	
Wynton Marsalis	1982	Wynton Marsalis	Composer, producer, primary artist, piano	
New Gold Dream	1982	Simple Minds	Keyboards, soloist, vocals	
Vocalists (compilation)	1983	V.A./Tony Bennett	piano Recorded in 1964	
The Other Side of Round Midnight	1986	Dexter Gordon	Composer, producer, primary artist, piano	
Nightwind	1987	Mike Lawrence	Guest artist	
Renaissance	1987	Branford Marsalis	Guest artist, piano	
Don't Try This at Home	1988	Michael Brecker	Guest artist, piano	
Back on the Block	1989	Quincy Jones	Keyboards, soloist, synthesizer pads	
Miltons	1989	Milton Nascimento	Guest artist, piano, synthesizer bass	
Nick of Time	1989	Bonnie Raitt	Guest artist, main personnel, piano	
Charming Snakes	1990	Andy Summers	Guest artist, keyboards, piano	
Parallel Realities	1990	Jack DeJohnette	Guest artist, keyboards, piano	
Quintet U.S.A.	1990	Eric Dolphy	Recorded in 1962	
Take a Look	1993	Natalie Cole	Fender Rhodes, piano	
Solos and Duets	1994	Eliane Elias	Composer, duo partner, piano	
Angelus	1994	Milton Nascimento	Guest artist, piano	
Live at the Plugged Nickel 1965	1995	Miles Davis	Guest artist, piano Recorded in 1965	
Double Rainbow: The Music of Antonio Carlos Jobim	1995	Joe Henderson	Guest artist, piano	
A Time Remembered	1995	Art Davis	Pianist	
Antonio Carlos Jobim & Friends	1996	Antonio Carlos Jobim	Director, primary artist, keyboards, piano	
Standards	1998	Lee Morgan	Guest artist, piano, unknown contributor role Recorded in 1967	
The Illinois Concert	1999	Eric Dolphy	Guest artist, piano Recorded in 1963	
Sci-Fi	2000	Christian McBride	Guest artist, piano on two tracks	
Nearness of You: The Ballad Book	2001	Michael Brecker	Composer, main personnel, piano	
M^{2}	2001	Marcus Miller	Guest artist, piano	
Travelogue	2002	Joni Mitchell	Guest artist, piano	
Seasons of a Life	2006	Lena Horne	Guest artist, piano	
Pilgrimage	2007	Michael Brecker	Guest artist, piano	
Virgin Forest	2007	Lionel Loueke	Composer, main personnel, piano	
Karibu	2008	Lionel Loueke	Composer, featured artist, piano	
Impressions	2012	Chris Botti	Composer, featured artist, piano	
You're Dead!	2014	Flying Lotus	Guest artist, piano	
Hidden Figures OST	2016	Hans Zimmer, Pharrell Williams and Benjamin Wallfisch	Guest artist, piano solo	
NOT TiGHT	2022	DOMi & JD BECK	Featured artist, piano and vocals	

- For every year (here reported chronologically) the albums are listed alphabetically by the last name of the artist.

== See also ==
- Herbie Hancock discography
- The Headhunters
- V.S.O.P.
