= Polar AC =

Compilation album by Freddie Hubbard
- Released: April 18, 1975
- Recorded: September 16, 1971 (#1); April 12, 1972 (#2–3); October 4–5, 1972 (#4); October 5 or 23, 1973 (#5)
- Studios: Van Gelder Studio, Englewood Cliffs
- Genre: Jazz
- Length: 40:20
- Labels: CTI; CTI 6056
- Producer: Creed Taylor

Freddie Hubbard chronology
Keep Your Soul Together (1974)	Polar AC (1975)	High Energy (1974)

Professional ratings
Review scores
Source	Rating
Allmusic	3/5 stars
The Rolling Stone Jazz Record Guide	1/5 stars

Polar AC is a compilation album by jazz trumpeter Freddie Hubbard. It was his final album released on Creed Taylor's CTI label and features performances by Hubbard, Hubert Laws, George Benson, Junior Cook, and Ron Carter. It was put together by CTI after Hubbard left the label to go to Columbia, and the tracks were recorded at different sessions, between 1971 and 1973. The album featured pieces: "People Make the World Go Round" and "Betcha, By Golly Wow", recorded both on April 12, 1972, and "Son of Sky Dive" recorded around 1973. "Polar AC" (aka "Fantasy in D" and "Ugetsu") came from First Light sessions, whilst "Naturally" was recorded during Sky Dive sessions, and both can be found on CD reissues of their respective albums.

== Track listing ==
1. "Polar AC" (Cedar Walton) - 6:56
2. "People Make the World Go Round" (Thom Bell, Linda Creed) - 5:54
3. "Betcha by Golly, Wow" (Thom Bell, Linda Creed) - 8:14
4. "Naturally" (Nat Adderley) - 5:55
5. "Son of Sky Dive" (Freddie Hubbard) - 13:21

== Personnel ==
- Freddie Hubbard: trumpet
- Junior Cook: tenor saxophone
- Hubert Laws: flute
- George Cables: piano (tracks 2 & 5)
- George Benson: guitar
- Ron Carter: bass
- Jack DeJohnette: drums (track 1)
- Lenny White: drums (tracks 2 & 5)
- Billy Cobham: drums (track 4)
- Airto Moreira: percussion (tracks 2 & 3)
- Strings (tracks 1–3): Al Brown, Paul Gershman, Emanuel "Manny" Green, Max Ellen, Theodore Israel, Harold Kohon, Charles Libove, Harry Lookofsky, Joe Malin, Charles McCracken, David Nadien, Gene Orloff, Matthew Raimondi, George Ricci, Tony Sophos, Tosha Samaroff, Irving Spice, Manny Vardi
- Woodwinds (track 4): Phil Bodner, Wally Kane, George Marge, Romeo Penque
- Brass (track 4): Wayne Andre, Garnett Brown, Paul Faulise, Tony Price, Alan Rubin, Marvin Stamm
- Don Sebesky: string arrangements (track 1), brass and woodwind arrangements (track 4)
- Bob James: string arrangements (tracks 2 & 3)

== Charts ==
Chart performance for Polar AC
Chart (1975)	Peak position
US Billboard 200	167
US Top R&B/Hip-Hop Albums (Billboard)	32
