= Body Talk (George Benson album) =

Studio album by George Benson
- Released: August 23, 1973
- Recorded: July 17–18, 1973
- Studios: Van Gelder Studio, Englewood Cliffs, New Jersey
- Genre: Jazz
- Length: 48:33
- Label: CTI
- Producer: Creed Taylor

George Benson chronology
White Rabbit (1972)	Body Talk (1973)	Bad Benson (1974)

Professional ratings
Review scores
Source	Rating
All About Jazz	4/5 stars
AllMusic	4/5 stars
The Penguin Guide to Jazz Recordings	2.5/4 stars
The Rolling Stone Jazz Record Guide	4/5 stars

Body Talk is a 1973 studio album by American guitarist George Benson, released on CTI Records.

== Track listing ==
All tracks are written by George Benson except where noted.

No.	Title	Writer(s)	Length
1.	"Dance"	George Benson, Pee Wee Ellis	8:22
2.	"When Love Has Grown"	Donny Hathaway, Gene McDaniels	5:03
3.	"Plum"		5:11
4.	"Body Talk"		8:21
5.	"Top of the World"		9:11
6.	"Body Talk" (Alternate Take - Bonus track on CD reissue 1989)		9:21

- Recorded at Van Gelder Studio, Englewood Cliffs, New Jersey on July 17 (Tracks 4–6) and 18 (Tracks 1–3), 1973.

== Later releases ==
This album was reissued on the Super Audio CD format in September 2018 by UK label Dutton Vocalion, remastered in both stereo and surround sound from the original analogue tapes by Michael J.Dutton. The surround sound portion of the disc features the quadraphonic mixes of the album, made available for the first time in over 40 years.

== Personnel ==
- George Benson – lead guitar
- Earl Klugh – rhythm guitar
- Harold Mabern – electric piano
- Ron Carter – acoustic bass
- Gary King – electric bass
- Jack DeJohnette – drums
- Mobutu – percussion, congas
- Frank Foster – tenor saxophone
- Gerald Chamberlain – trombone
- Dick Griffin – trombone
- Jon Faddis – trumpet, flugelhorn
- John Gatchell – trumpet, flugelhorn
- Waymon Reed – trumpet, flugelhorn
- Pee Wee Ellis – arrangements and conductor

Production

- Producer – Creed Taylor
- Engineer – Rudy Van Gelder
- Album Design – Bob Ciano
- Cover Photography – Pete Turner
- Liner Photography – Steve Salmieri
