= Canned Funk =

Studio album by Joe Farrell
- Released: 1975
- Recorded: November, December 1974
- Studio: Van Gelder, Englewood Cliffs, NJ
- Genre: Jazz fusion, jazz-funk, hard bop
- Length: 34:01
- Label: CTI
- Producer: Creed Taylor

Joe Farrell chronology
Upon This Rock (1974)	Canned Funk (1975)	Benson & Farrell (1976)

Professional ratings
Review scores
Source	Rating
AllMusic	2.5/5.0 stars
The Rolling Stone Jazz Record Guide	1/5 stars

Canned Funk is a jazz album by Joe Farrell for CTI Records. It was recorded at Van Gelder Studios November and December 1974. The album was released in 1975.

== Track listing ==
Side one

1. "Canned Funk" (Joe Farrell) – 7:20
2. "Animal" (Farrell) – 9:55

Side two

1. "Suite Martinique" (Farrell) – 9:03
2. "Spoken Silence" (Farrell) – 7:43

== Personnel ==
- Joe Farrell – tenor saxophone, soprano saxophone, baritone saxophone, flute
- Herb Bushler – bass
- Joe Beck – guitar
- Jimmy Madison – drums
- Ray Mantilla – conga, percussion

Recording credits

- Producer – Creed Taylor
- Cover photograph – Pete Turner
- Liner photograph – Sheila Metzner
- Album design – Bob Ciano

== Chart performance ==
Year	Chart	Position
1975	Billboard Jazz Albums	30
