= Bad Benson =

Studio album by George Benson
- Released: October 13, 1974
- Recorded: April 22 – June 20, 1974
- Studio: Van Gelder Studio, Englewood Cliffs, New Jersey
- Genre: Jazz
- Length: 50:36
- Label: CTI
- Producer: Creed Taylor

George Benson chronology
Body Talk (1973)	Bad Benson (1974)	In Concert-Carnegie Hall (1976)

Professional ratings
Review scores
Source	Rating
Allmusic	3/5 stars
The Rolling Stone Jazz Record Guide	2/5 stars
The Penguin Guide to Jazz Recordings	2/4 stars

Bad Benson is a 1974 studio album by American guitarist George Benson, released on CTI Records.

== Track listing ==
1. "Take Five" (Paul Desmond) - 7:08
2. "Summer Wishes, Winter Dreams" (Alan Bergman, Marilyn Bergman, Johnny Mandel) - 2:56
3. "My Latin Brother" (George Benson) - 6:50
4. "No Sooner Said Than Done" (Phil Upchurch) - 5:59
5. "Full Compass" (Upchurch) - 5:40
6. "The Changing World" (Benson, Art Gore) - 4:53
7. "Take the 'A' Train" (Billy Strayhorn) - 4:13 Bonus track on CD reissue
8. "Serbian Blue" (Don Sebesky) - 13:03 Bonus track on CD reissue
9. "From Now On" (Benson) - 2:20 Bonus track on CD reissue
- Recorded at Van Gelder Studio, Englewood Cliffs, New Jersey on April 22 (Track 9), May 29 (Tracks 1, 3 & 5), May 30 (Tracks 4, 6–8) and June 20 (Track 2), 1974.

== Personnel ==
- George Benson – guitar
- Phil Upchurch – guitar, percussion (3), electric bass (5)
- Kenny Barron – piano
- Ron Carter – bass
- Steve Gadd – drums
- Garnett Brown, Warren Covington, Wayne Andre – trombone
- Paul Faulise – bass trombone
- Alan Rubin, Joe Shepley, John Frosk – trumpet
- Phil Bodner – English horn, clarinet, alto flute
- George Marge – English horn, flute, piccolo flute
- Ray Beckenstein – flute
- Albert Regni – flute, clarinet
- Brooks Tillotson, Jim Buffington – French horn
- Margaret Ross – harp
- Alan Shulman, Charles McCracken, Frank Levy, Jesse Levy, Paul Tobias, Seymour Barab – cello
- Don Sebesky – arrangements and conductor

=== Production ===
- Creed Taylor – producer
- Rudy Van Gelder – engineer, mastering (4–6)
- Bob Ciano – album's design
- Ben Rose – cover photography
- Pete Turner – liner photography
