= Benson & Farrell =

Studio album by George Benson and Joe Farrell
- Released: October 1976
- Recorded: January 20 & 21 and March 12, 1976
- Studio: Van Gelder, Englewood Cliffs, New Jersey; A & R, New York City, New York
- Genre: Jazz
- Length: 36:11
- Label: CTI
- Producer: Creed Taylor

George Benson chronology
Good King Bad (1976)	Benson & Farrell (1976)	Breezin' (1976)

Benson & Farrell is an album co-led by American guitarist George Benson and jazz saxophonist and flutist Joe Farrell; both artists had previously released several albums on the CTI label and had also contributed to the albums Free, CTI Summer Jazz at the Hollywood Bowl, and Giant Box.

== Reception ==
Benson & Farrell gained mixed reviews upon release. The AllMusic review calls the album a "pleasing if not all that memorable instrumental date".

Professional ratings
Review scores
Source	Rating
AllMusic	2.5/5 stars
The Rolling Stone Jazz Record Guide	3/5 stars

== Track listing ==
All compositions by David Matthews except as indicated

1. "Flute Song" - 6:05
2. "Beyond the Ozone" - 7:03
3. "Camel Hump" - 6:25
4. "Rolling Home" - 7:15
5. "Old Devil Moon" (Burton Lane, E.Y. "Yip" Harburg) - 9:23

== Personnel ==
- George Benson – guitar
- Joe Farrell – flute (1, 3, 5), bass flute (1, 3, 5), soprano saxophone (3, 4)

Additional Musicians:

- Don Grolnick – electric piano (1–4)
- Sonny Bravo – acoustic piano (5)
- Eric Gale – guitar (1, 3)
- Steve Khan – guitar (2, 4)
- Will Lee – bass (1–4)
- Gary King – bass (5)
- Andy Newmark – drums (1–4)
- Nicky Marrero – percussion
- Jose Madera – congas (5)
- Michael Collaza – timbales (5)
- Eddie Daniels – alto flute (1, 3, 5)
- David Tofani – alto flute (1, 3)
- David Matthews – arrangements and conductor

Production:

- Creed Taylor – producer
- Don Hahn – engineer
- Rudy Van Gelder – engineer, mixing, mastering
- Rene Schumacher – album design
- Alen MacWeeney – photography

== Chart performance ==
Year	Chart	Position
1976	Billboard 200	100
1976	Billboard R&B Albums	27
1976	Billboard Jazz Albums	3
