= Don't Mess with Mister T. =

Album by Stanley Turrentine

Don't Mess With Mister T.

Studio album by Stanley Turrentine
- Released: September 1973
- Recorded: March 14, 1973 (#6); March 15, 1973 (#7–8); June 7, 1973 (#1, 3, 5); June 8, 1973 (#2, 4)
- Studio: Van Gelder Studio, Englewood Cliffs, NJ
- Genre: Soul-jazz; hard bop
- Length: 32:40
- Label: CTI; CTI 6030
- Producer: Creed Taylor

Stanley Turrentine chronology
In Concert Volume Two (1973)	Don't Mess With Mister T. (1973)	Pieces of Dreams (1974)

Don't Mess With Mister T. is a Stanley Turrentine album produced by Creed Taylor on his label, CTI. It was arranged by Bob James and recorded at Van Gelder Studio in June 1973.

== Reception ==
The Allmusic review by Ron Wynn awarded the album 4½ stars.

Professional ratings
Review scores
Source	Rating
Allmusic	4.5/5 stars
The Rolling Stone Jazz Record Guide	2/5 stars

== Track listing ==
1. "Don't Mess With Mister T." (Marvin Gaye) – 9:51
2. "Two for T." (Turrentine) – 7:06
3. "Too Blue" (Turrentine) – 7:21
4. "I Could Never Repay Your Love" (Bruce Hawes) – 8:22

Bonus tracks on CD reissue

5. "Pieces of Dreams" (Alan and Marilyn Bergman, Michel Legrand) - 7:28
6. "Don't Mess With Mister T." [Alternate Take] - 7:10
7. "Mississippi City Strut" - 8:40 (Billy Cobham)
8. "Harlem Dawn" - 7:50 (Bob James)

== Personnel ==
- Stanley Turrentine - tenor saxophone
- Bob James - piano, electric piano, arranger, conductor
- Harold Mabern - electric piano
- Richard Tee - organ
- Idris Muhammad - drums
- Billy Cobham - drums on tracks 6,7 & 8
- Rubens Bassini - percussion
- Ron Carter - bass
- Eric Gale - guitar
- Randy Brecker - trumpet
- John Frosk - flugelhorn
- Alan Raph - bass trombone
- Pepper Adams - baritone saxophone
- Jerry Dodgion - alto saxophone
- Joe Farrell - tenor saxophone
- Harry Cykman, Harry Glickman, Emanuel Green, Harold Kohon, Guy Lumia, David Nadien, John Pintaualle, Irving Spice - violin
- Harold Coletta, Emanuel Vardi - viola
- Seymour Barab, George Ricci - cello
