= You, Baby =

Studio album by Nat Adderley
- Released: 1969
- Recorded: March 26–28 & April 4, 1968
- Studio: Van Gelder Studio, Englewood Cliffs, NJ
- Genre: Jazz
- Length: 36:09
- Label: CTI
- Producer: Creed Taylor

Nat Adderley chronology
The Scavenger (1968)	You, Baby (1969)	Calling Out Loud (1968)

You, Baby is an album by jazz cornetist Nat Adderley released on the CTI label featuring performances by Adderley with Jerome Richardson, Joe Zawinul, Ron Carter, and Grady Tate and an orchestra arranged and conducted by Bill Fischer.

== Reception ==
The Allmusic review by Richard S. Ginell awarded the album 4½ stars calling it "A lovely, intensely musical album, well worth seeking out".

Professional ratings
Review scores
Source	Rating
Allmusic	4.5/5 stars

== Track listing ==
All compositions by Nat Adderley except as indicated

1. "You Baby" (Ivy Hunter, Jack Goga, Jeffrey Bowen) - 2:46
2. "By the Time I Get to Phoenix" (Jim Webb) - 3:20
3. "Electric Eel" - 4:58
4. "Early Chanson" [aka "Joe's Blues #1"] (Joe Zawinul) - 2:25
5. "Denise" (Wilson J. Turbinton, Earl J. Turbinton) - 3:59
6. "Early Minor" [aka "Joe's Untitled #2"] (Zawinul) - 3:45
7. "My Son" (Caiphus Semenya) - 4:28
8. "New Orleans" - 4:20
9. "Hang On In" (Eric Knight) - 3:31
10. "Halftime" (Nat Adderley, Julian "Cannonball" Adderley) - 2:39

- Recorded at Englewood Cliffs, New Jersey on March 26, 1968 (tracks 4 & 7), March 27, 1968 (tracks 3, 6 & 9), March 28, 1968 (tracks 2, 5, 8 & 10) and April 4, 1968 (track 1)

== Personnel ==
Musicians

- Nat Adderley – cornet
- Jerome Richardson - soprano saxophone, flute
- Harvey Estrin, Romeo Penque, Joe Soldo - flute
- George Marge - flute, oboe
- Joe Zawinul - electric piano
- Ron Carter - bass
- Grady Tate - drums
- Al Brown, Selwart Clarke, Bernard Zaslav - viola
- Charles McCracken, George Ricci, Alan Shulman - cello
- Bill Fischer - arranger, conductor

Production

- Creed Taylor – producer
- Rudy Van Gelder – engineer
- Sam Antupit – design
- Pete Turner - photography
