= Calling Out Loud =

Studio album by Nat Adderley
- Released: 1969
- Recorded: November 19, 21 & December 4, 1968
- Studio: Van Gelder Studio, Englewood Cliffs, NJ
- Genre: Jazz
- Length: 36:26
- Label: CTI
- Producer: Creed Taylor

Nat Adderley chronology
You, Baby (1968)	Calling Out Loud (1969)	Soul Zodiac (1972)

Calling Out Loud is an album by jazz cornetist Nat Adderley released on the CTI label featuring performances by Adderley with Jerome Richardson, Joe Zawinul, Ron Carter, and Leo Morris and with brass and woodwinds arranged and conducted by Bill Fischer.

== Reception ==
The Allmusic review by Richard S. Ginell awarded the album 4½ stars calling it "A fascinating album, beautifully produced".

Professional ratings
Review scores
Source	Rating
Allmusic	4.5/5 stars

== Track listing ==
All compositions by Nat Adderley except where noted

1. "Biafra" - 6:32
2. "Haifa" - 4:57
3. "St. M" (William S. Fischer) - 3:37
4. "Grey Moss" (Joe Zawinul) - 3:43
5. "Nobody Knows" (Fischer) - 5:53
6. "Comin' Out the Shadows" - 5:09
7. "Ivan's Holiday" (Zawinul) - 3:14
8. "Calling Out Loud" (Adderley, Fischer) - 3:21
- Recorded at Englewood Cliffs, New Jersey on November 19, 1968 (tracks 7 & 8), November 21, 1968 (tracks 1 & 5) and December 4, 1968 (tracks 2–4 & 6)

== Personnel ==
Musicians

- Nat Adderley – cornet
- Paul Ingraham – French horn
- Seldon Powell – saxophone
- Jerome Richardson – saxophone
- Jerry Dodgion – saxophone
- Richard Henderson – saxophone
- Hubert Laws – flute, piccolo
- Don MacCourt – bassoon
- George Marge – clarinet, English horn, saxophone
- Romeo Penque – bass clarinet
- Joe Zawinul – electric piano
- Ron Carter – bass
- Leo Morris – drums
- Bill Fischer – arranger, conductor

Production

- Creed Taylor – producer
- Rudy Van Gelder – engineer
- Sam Antupit – design
- Pete Turner – photography
- Jon Borgzinner – liner notes
