= Walking in Space =

1969 studio album by Quincy Jones

Studio album by Quincy Jones
- Released: 1969
- Recorded: June 18–19, 1969
- Genre: Jazz; lounge
- Length: 35:06
- Label: A&M/CTI
- Producer: Creed Taylor

Quincy Jones chronology
The Lost Man (1969)	Walking in Space (1969)	Bob & Carol & Ted & Alice (1969)

Professional ratings
Review scores
Source	Rating
Allmusic	5/5 stars
DownBeat	4.5/5 stars

Walking in Space is a 1969 studio album by Quincy Jones. The album was recorded for A&M who released the album with a cover photo of Jones taken by Pete Turner. Vocalist Valerie Simpson is featured on the title track, an arrangement of a song from the hit rock musical Hair. "Dead End" is also from Hair and "Killer Joe" features Ray Brown on bass and Grady Tate on drums.

== Track listing ==
1. "Dead End" (Galt MacDermot, James Rado, Gerome Ragni) – 4:05
2. "Walking in Space" (MacDermot, Rado, Ragni) – 12:06
3. "Killer Joe" (Benny Golson) – 5:12
4. "Love and Peace" (Arthur Adams) – 5:48
5. "I Never Told You" (Arthur Hamilton, Johnny Mandel) – 4:18
6. "Oh Happy Day" (Edwin Hawkins) – 3:37

== Personnel ==
- Quincy Jones – conductor, arranger
- Freddie Hubbard, Lloyd Michaels, Dick Williams, John Frosk, Marvin Stamm, Snooky Young – trumpet
- Jimmy Cleveland, J. J. Johnson, Alan Raph, Tony Studd, Norman Pride, Kai Winding – trombone
- Joel Kaye, Roland Kirk, Hubert Laws, Jerome Richardson – reeds
- Paul Griffin – piano
- Eric Gale – electric guitar
- Ray Brown – double bass
- Chuck Rainey – bass on "Love and Peace"
- Bob James – electric piano
- Hubert Laws – flute, tenor sax
- Toots Thielemans – guitar, harmonica
- Bernard Purdie, Grady Tate – drums
- Hilda Harris – vocals
- Marilyn Jackson – vocals
- Valerie Simpson – vocal solo on "Walking in Space"
- Maretha Stewart – vocals

Technical

- Pete Turner – photography
