= Outback (album) =

Studio album by Joe Farrell
- Released: 1972
- Recorded: November 4, 1971
- Studio: Van Gelder, Englewood Cliffs, NJ
- Genre: Jazz
- Length: 33:20
- Label: CTI
- Producer: Creed Taylor

Joe Farrell chronology
Joe Farrell Quartet (1970)	Outback (1972)	Moon Germs (1972)

Professional ratings
Review scores
Source	Rating
AllMusic	5/5 stars
The Rolling Stone Jazz Record Guide	3/5 stars

Outback is a jazz album by Joe Farrell on the CTI Records label. It was recorded at the Van Gelder Studio in November 1971.

== Track listing ==
=== Side one ===
1. "Outback (From the Motion Picture Outback)" (John Scott) – 8:40
2. "Sound Down" (Joe Farrell, Geri Farrell) – 8:30

=== Side two ===
1. "Bleeding Orchid" (Chick Corea) – 6:45
2. "November 68th" (Joe Farrell) – 9:25

== Personnel ==
Musicians

- Joe Farrell – tenor and soprano saxophone, flute, alto flute, piccolo
- Chick Corea – electric piano
- Elvin Jones – drums
- Buster Williams – acoustic bass
- Airto Moreira – percussions

Production

- Creed Taylor – producer
- Rudy Van Gelder – engineer
- Bob Ciano – design
- Pete Turner – phtography (cover)
- Chuck Stewart – phtography (liner)
