= Upon This Rock (Joe Farrell album) =

Studio album by Joe Farrell
- Released: 1974
- Recorded: October 1973, March 1974
- Studio: Van Gelder
- Genre: Crossover jazz, jazz-rock, hard bop
- Length: 36:49
- Label: CTI
- Producer: Creed Taylor

Joe Farrell chronology
Penny Arcade (1973)	Upon This Rock (1974)	Canned Funk (1975)

Professional ratings
Review scores
Source	Rating
AllMusic	2.5/5.0 stars
The Rolling Stone Jazz Record Guide	3/5 stars

Upon This Rock is an album by Joe Farrell released in 1974.

In 2008 it returned to media attention when Farrell's daughter sued Kanye West, Method Man, Redman, Common and their respective record companies over alleged sampling of the title track.

== Track listing ==
Side one

1. "Weathervane" (Joe Farrell) – 8:00
2. "I Won't Be Back" (Joe Beck) – 10:05

Side two

1. "Upon This Rock " (Joe Farrell) – 11:54
2. "Seven Seas" (Joe Beck) – 6:50

== Personnel ==
- Joe Farrell – tenor saxophone, soprano saxophone, flute
- Herb Bushler – bass
- Joe Beck – guitar
- Jimmy Madison – drums
- Steve Gadd – drums (on "I Won't Be Back")
- Herbie Hancock – piano (on "I Won't Be Back")
- Don Alias – conga (on "I Won't Be Back")

Recording credits

- Engineer – Rudy Van Gelder
- Producer – Creed Taylor
- Cover photograph – Pete Turner
- Liner photographs – Gene Laurents
- Album design – Sibbie McDonough

== Chart performance ==
Year	Chart	Position
1974	Billboard Jazz Albums	24
