= Cherry (Stanley Turrentine album) =

Studio album by Stanley Turrentine with Milt Jackson
- Released: September 1972
- Recorded: May 17–18 & 24, 1972
- Studio: Van Gelder Studio, Englewood Cliffs, NJ
- Genre: Soul-jazz; Hard bop
- Length: 37:49 original LP
- Label: CTI; CTI 6017
- Producer: Creed Taylor

Stanley Turrentine chronology
Salt Song (1971)	Cherry (1972)	Freddie Hubbard/Stanley Turrentine in Concert Volume One (1973)

Milt Jackson chronology
Reunion Blues (1972)	Cherry (1972)	The Legendary Profile (1972)

Professional ratings
Review scores
Source	Rating
Allmusic	4/5 stars

Cherry is a 1972 album by saxophonist Stanley Turrentine featuring Milt Jackson.

== Track listing ==
1. "Speedball" (Lee Morgan) – 6:39
2. "I Remember You" (Johnny Mercer, Victor Schertzinger) – 5:10
3. "The Revs" (Milt Jackson) – 7:46
4. "Sister Sanctified" (Weldon Irvine) – 6:04
5. "Cherry" (Ray Gilbert, Don Redman) – 5:10
6. "Introspective" (Irvine) – 7:00
7. "The More I See You" (Gordon, Warren) – 7:56 Bonus track on CD

== Personnel ==
- Stanley Turrentine – tenor saxophone
- Milt Jackson – vibraphone
- Bob James – piano, electric piano, arranger
- Cornell Dupree – guitar
- Ron Carter – bass
- Billy Cobham – drums
- Weldon Irvine Jr. – arranger (#6, 7)
