= Mizrab (album) =

Studio album by Gábor Szabó
- Released: 1973
- Recorded: December 1972
- Studio: Van Gelder Studio, Englewood Cliffs, New Jersey
- Genre: Jazz
- Length: 36:32
- Label: CTI; CTI 6026
- Producer: Creed Taylor

Gábor Szabó chronology
Small World (1972)	Mizrab (1973)	Rambler (1974)

Mizrab is an album by Hungarian guitarist Gábor Szabó featuring performances recorded in 1972 and released on the CTI label.

== Reception ==
The Allmusic review states "The music is well played but not particularly memorable".

Professional ratings
Review scores
Source	Rating
Allmusic	3/5 stars
The Rolling Stone Jazz Record Guide	2/5 stars

== Track listing ==
All compositions by Gábor Szabó except as indicated

1. "Mizrab" - 9:35
2. "Thirteen" - 9:16
3. "It's Going to Take Some Time" (Carole King, Toni Stern) - 4:14
4. "Concerto #2" (Dmitri Shostakovich) - 7:20
5. "Summer Breeze" (Jim Seals, Dash Crofts) - 6:07

- Recorded at Van Gelder Studio in Englewood Cliffs, New Jersey in December 1972

== Personnel ==
- Gábor Szabó - guitar
- Bob James - electric piano, arranger, conductor
- Ron Carter - bass, arco bass
- Billy Cobham - drums on "Mizrab" and "It's Going to Take Some Time"
- Jack DeJohnette - drums
- Ralph MacDonald - percussion
- Marvin Stamm - trumpet, flugelhorn
- Wayne Andre - trombone
- James Buffington, Brooks Tillotson - French horn
- John Campo - bass clarinet, bassoon
- Sidney Weinberg - oboe, English horn
- Hubert Laws - flute, bass flute, alto flute, piccolo
- George Marge - oboe, clarinet, recorder
- Max Ellen, Paul Gershman, Harold Kohan, Charles Libove, Joe Malim, David Nadien, John Pintaualle, Irving Spice - violin
- Richard Dickler, Theodore Israel - viola
- Charles McCracken, George Ricci, Alan Shulman - cello
- Charles Israel - arco bass
- Margaret Ross - harp
