= Moon Germs =

Studio album by Joe Farrell
- Released: 1973
- Recorded: November 21, 1972
- Studio: Van Gelder, Englewood Cliffs
- Genre: Post-bop, jazz fusion
- Length: 37:34
- Label: CTI; CTI 6023
- Producer: Creed Taylor

Joe Farrell chronology
Outback (1972)	Moon Germs (1973)	Penny Arcade (1973)

Professional ratings
Review scores
Source	Rating
All About Jazz	(favorable)
AllMusic	4/5 stars
The Penguin Guide to Jazz Recordings	3/4 stars
The Rolling Stone Jazz Record Guide	4/5 stars

Moon Germs is a jazz album by Joe Farrell, recorded at the Van Gelder Studio on November 21, 1972, and released on CTI Records.

== Track listing ==
1. "Great Gorge" (Joe Farrell) – 11:48
2. "Moon Germs" (Farrell) – 7:27
3. "Time's Lie" (Chick Corea) – 8:32
4. "Bass Folk Song" (Stanley Clarke) – 9:47

== Personnel ==
- Joe Farrell – soprano saxophone, flute
- Herbie Hancock – electric piano
- Stanley Clarke – bass
- Jack DeJohnette – drums

Recording credits

- Engineer – Rudy Van Gelder
- Cover photograph – Pete Turner
- Liner photograph – Sheila Metzner
- Album design – Bob Ciano

== Chart performance ==
Year	Chart	Position
1976	Billboard Jazz Albums	17
