= Rubens Bassini =

Brazilian musician (1933–85)

Rubens Bassini (January 26, 1933 in Rio de Janeiro – September 1985) was a Brazilian percussionist, who played bongos and congas above all. He played together with the band Os Ipanemas: Astor Silva; (trombone), Marinho (bass), Wilson das Neves (drums) and Neco (guitar).

He also played with Judy Collins, João Gilberto, Sérgio Mendes, Chuck Mangione, Edu Lobo, Rosinha de Valenca, Dom Salvador, Carly Simon, Spyro Gyra, Lee Ritenour, Eumir Deodato and Dave Grusin, predominantly Bossa Nova.

== Discography ==
- Rubens Bassini E Os 11 Magnificos 1960 Rio de Janeiro, Brasil re- issued 2002
- Rubens Bassini Y Los Latinos 1963 Rio de Janeiro, Brasil re -issued 2010
- Rubens Bassini with Sérgio Mendes and Brasil '66, 77, 88
- Deodato - Deodato 2 - 1973 (CTI Records)
- The Atlantic Family Live at Montreux - 1976 (Atlantic Records)

=== As sideman ===
With Herbie Mann

- Brazil: Once Again (Atlantic, 1977)

With Chuck Mangione

- Main Squeeze (A&M, 1976)

With Jimmy McGriff

- Tailgunner (LRC, 1977)

With Don Sebesky

- Giant Box (CTI, 1973)

With The Spinners

- Dancin' and Lovin' (Atlantic, 1979)

With Stanley Turrentine

- Don't Mess with Mister T. (CTI, 1973)

With Vince Guaraldi

- Alma-Ville (Warner Bros.-Seven Arts, 1969)

With Spyro Gyra (album),1977
