= Space (George Benson album) =

Compilation album by George Benson
- Released: 1978
- Recorded: 1975
- Genre: Jazz; R&B
- Label: CTI Records
- Producer: Creed Taylor

George Benson chronology
Weekend in L.A. (1978)	Space (1978)	Livin' Inside Your Love (1979)

Space is a compilation album by George Benson released in 1978 on CTI Records. It features his rendition of Sam & Dave's "Hold On, I'm Coming" recorded during the Good King Bad sessions as well as some additional songs from his Carnegie Hall performance.

== Track listing ==
All tracks recorded live at Carnegie Hall, except as noted.

=== Side one ===
1. "Hold On, I'm Coming (5:44) " Previously Unreleased. Recorded at Van Gelder Studios, later included as a bonus track on the CD release of Good King Bad
2. "Summertime" (7:16) from In Concert-Carnegie Hall
3. "Sky Dive" (6:51) Previously Unreleased

=== Side two ===
1. "Octane" (10:12) from In Concert-Carnegie Hall
2. "Gone" (Incorrectly listed as "No Sooner Said Than Done") (8:04) from In Concert-Carnegie Hall

== Personnel ==
- George Benson - guitar, vocals
- Phil Upchurch, Eric Gale - guitar
- Hubert Laws - flute
- Don Grolnick, Cliff Carter, Ronnie Foster - keyboards
- Will Lee, Wilbur Bascomb, Jr., Wayne Dockery - bass guitar
- Steve Gadd, Andy Newmark, Marvin Chappell - drums
- Ray Armando, Johnny Griggs, Sue Evans - percussion
- Randy Brecker - trumpet
- Fred Wesley - trombone
- Frank Vicari - tenor saxophone
- Ronnie Cuber - baritone saxophone
