= The Rape of El Morro =

Studio album by Don Sebesky
- Released: 1975
- Recorded: April–May 1975
- Studio: Van Gelder Studio, Englewood Cliffs, NJ
- Genre: Jazz
- Length: 36:12
- Label: CTI; CTI 6061 S1
- Producer: Creed Taylor

Don Sebesky chronology
Giant Box (1973)	The Rape of El Morro (1975)	Three Works For Jazz Soloists & Symphony Orchestra (1979)

Professional ratings
Review scores
Source	Rating
Allmusic	3/5 stars
The Rolling Stone Jazz Record Guide	1/5 stars

The Rape of El Morro is an album by American arranger/conductor and composer Don Sebesky featuring performances recorded in 1975 and released on the CTI label.

== Track listing ==
All compositions by Don Sebesky except where noted

1. "The Rape of El Morro" – 7:41
2. "Moon Dreams" (John Chalmers MacGregor, Johnny Mercer) – 5:30
3. "Skyliner" (Charlie Barnet, Billy Moore Jr.) – 5:49
4. "The Entertainer" (Scott Joplin) – 4:12
5. "Footprints of the Giant" (based on themes by Béla Bartók; arranged and adapted by Don Sebesky) – 7:32
6. "Lucky Seven" – 5:28

- Recorded at Van Gelder Studio in Englewood Cliffs, New Jersey between April and May, 1975

== Personnel ==
- Don Sebesky – keyboards, arranger, conductor
- Randy Brecker, Jon Faddis – trumpet
- Wayne Andre, Barry Rogers, Sonny Russo – trombone
- Tony Studd – bass trombone
- Michael Brecker – tenor saxophone
- David Sanborn – alto saxophone
- Ray Beckenstetein – flute, alto flute, piccolo
- Harvey Estrin, Walt Levinsky, George Marge, Al Regni – flute
- Don Grolnick, Roland Hanna, Pat Rebillot – keyboards
- Joe Beck – guitar
- Ron Carter, Will Lee – bass
- Steve Gadd – drums
- George Devens, Phil Kraus – percussion
- Harry Cykman, Paul Gershman, Harry Glickman, Emanuel Green, Harold Kohon, Charles Libove, Harry Lookofsky, David Nadien, Matthew Raimondi, David Rose – violin
- Jean R. Dane, Manny Vardi – viola
- Seymour Barab, Charles McCracken – cello
- Joan LaBarbara – vocals
- Bob Ciano, Richard Mantel – album design
