= Song of the Wind =

Song of the Wind may refer to:

- "Song of the Wind", a song by Chick Corea from the album Piano Improvisations Vol. 1, 1971
- Song of the Wind, an alternate title for the Joe Farrell album Joe Farrell Quartet, 1970
- "Song of the Wind", a song by Santana from Caravanserai (album), 1972

== See also ==
- Song of the Wind and the Trees
