= Penny Arcade (album) =

Studio album by Joe Farrell
- Released: 1973
- Recorded: October 1973
- Studio: Van Gelder, Englewood Cliffs, NJ
- Genre: Jazz
- Length: 36:10
- Label: CTI
- Producer: Creed Taylor

Joe Farrell chronology
Moon Germs (1972)	Penny Arcade (1973)	Upon This Rock (1974)

Penny Arcade is a jazz album by Joe Farrell on the CTI Records label. It was recorded at the Van Gelder Studio in October 1973.

== Reception ==
Professional ratings
Review scores
Source	Rating
AllMusic	3/5 stars
DownBeat	3/5 stars
The Rolling Stone Jazz Record Guide	3/5 stars

Ray Townley of DownBeat wrote, "Farrell is just one of those musicians who happens to be a monstrous player (has thorough concep tion of his instrument and the facility to ex ecute ideas on it), but who is only an average composer of original material or re-arranger of other people's". Townley praises Farrell’s playing as "fluid and melodic," especially on "Geo Blue" as "the type of playing we’ve come to expect from Joe since he won the db Critics Poll in '68". He singles out Hancock's contribution on "Cloud Cream" with Hancock "excelling on piano, this time acoustically (and reminiscent of his early-’60s work with Willie Bobo)".

== Track listing ==
Side one

1. "Penny Arcade" (Joe Beck) – 4:45
2. "Too High" (Stevie Wonder) – 13:15

Side two

1. "Hurricane Jane" (Joe Farrell) – 4:25
2. "Cloud Cream" (Joe Farrell) – 6:15
3. "Geo Blue" (Joe Farrell) – 7:30

== Personnel ==
- Joe Farrell – tenor and soprano sax, flute, piccolo
- Herbie Hancock – piano
- Joe Beck – guitar
- Steve Gadd – drums
- Herb Bushler – bass
- Don Alias – conga

Recording credits

- Engineer – Rudy Van Gelder
- Producer – Creed Taylor
- Cover photograph – Pete Turner
- Liner photograph – Sheila Green Metzner
- Album design – Bob Ciano
