= Glory of Love (album) =

Studio album by Herbie Mann
- Released: 1968
- Recorded: July 26–27, September 19 and October 6, 1967
- Studio: Van Gelder, Englewood Cliffs
- Genre: Jazz
- Length: 34:27
- Label: CTI
- Producer: Creed Taylor

Herbie Mann chronology
The Herbie Mann String Album (1967)	Glory of Love (1968)	Windows Opened (1968)

Glory of Love is an album by flautist Herbie Mann released on the CTI label featuring performances recorded at Rudy Van Gelder's studio in 1967.

== Reception ==
The Allmusic review by Scott Yanow awarded the album 2 stars stating "the most interesting aspect of the R&B-oriented date is that the up-and-coming flutist Hubert Laws is matched with Mann on several tracks".

Professional ratings
Review scores
Source	Rating
Allmusic	2/5 stars

== Track listing ==
All compositions by Herbie Mann except as indicated

1. "No Use Crying" (Roy Gaines, Freddie Lee Kober, J. B. Daniels) - 3:03
2. "Hold On, I'm Comin'" (Isaac Hayes, David Porter) - 3:12
3. "Glory of Love" (Billy Hill) - 2:42
4. "Unchain My Heart" (Robert Sharp Jr., Teddy Powell) - 3:12
5. "House of the Rising Sun" (Traditional) - 3:10
6. "The Letter" (Wayne Carson) - 3:25
7. "Upa, Neguinho" (Edu Lobo, Gianfrancesco Guanieri) - 2:39
8. "Love Is Stronger Far Than We" (Pierre Barouh, Jerry Keller, Francis Lai) - 3:11
9. "Oh, How I Want To Love You" - 5:32
10. "In and Out" - 4:34

- Recorded at Van Gelder Studio in Englewood Cliffs, New Jersey on July 26 (tracks 1, 3-6, 8 & 9), July 27 (track 10), September 19 (track 7) and October 6 (track 2), 1967

== Personnel ==
- Herbie Mann - flute, arranger, conductor
- Hubert Laws - flute, piccolo
- Ernie Royal, Burt Collins - trumpet, flugelhorn
- Benny Powell - trombone
- Joseph Grimaldi - saxophone
- Leroy Glover - piano, organ, arranger, conductor
- Paul Griffin - piano
- Roland Hanna - organ
- Jay Berliner, Eric Gale - guitar
- Ron Carter - bass
- Herb Lovelle, Grady Tate - drums
- Teddy Sommer - vibraphone, percussion
- Ray Barretto, Johnny Pacheco - percussion
- Herb Bernstein - arranger, conductor
- Earl May - bass
- Roy Ayers - vibes

Technical

- Rudy Van Gelder - engineer
- Sam Antupit - album design
- Pete Turner - photography
