= Joe Farrell Quartet =

Studio album by Joe Farrell
- Released: 1970
- Recorded: July 1–2, 1970
- Studio: Van Gelder Studio, Englewood Cliffs, New Jersey
- Genre: Jazz
- Length: 34:17
- Label: CTI
- Producer: Creed Taylor

Joe Farrell chronology
Joe Farrell Quartet (1970)	Outback (1971)

Professional ratings
Review scores
Source	Rating
Allmusic	4.5/5.0 stars

Joe Farrell Quartet is a jazz album by Joe Farrell that was released by CTI Records. It was recorded at the Van Gelder Studio on July 1 and 2, 1970. Guitarist John McLaughlin plays on two tracks, and there are two duo tracks, one with Dave Holland and one with Chick Corea. The album was re-released twice in the mid 1970s (with different cover art in each instance) as Super Session and Song of the Wind.

== Track listing ==
=== Side one ===
1. "Follow Your Heart" (McLaughlin) – 6:50
2. "Collage for Polly" (Farrell) – 2:28
3. "Circle in the Square" (Farrell) – 7:11

=== Side two ===
1. "Molten Glass" (Farrell) – 5:15
2. "Alter Ego" (Farrell) – 1:23 (duet with Dave Holland)
3. "Song of the Wind" (Corea) – 5:57 (duet with Chick Corea)
4. "Motion" (Corea) – 5:13

== Personnel ==
Musicians

- Joe Farrell – tenor saxophone, flute, oboe
- Chick Corea – piano
- Dave Holland – double bass
- Jack DeJohnette – drums
- John McLaughlin – guitar ("Follow Your Heart" and "Motion" only)

Production

- Creed Taylor – producer
- Rudy Van Gelder – engineer
- Sam Antupit – design
- Pete Turner – photography (cover)
- Robert Brosan – photography (liner)

== See also ==
- Miles Davis, Miles Davis at Fillmore (1970)
- Chick Corea, The Song of Singing (1971)
