= The San Francisco Concert =

Live album by Hubert Laws
- Released: 1977
- Recorded: October 4, 1975 at the Paramount Theatre in Oakland, California
- Genre: Jazz
- Length: 36:12
- Label: CTI
- Producer: Creed Taylor

Hubert Laws chronology
The Chicago Theme (1975)	The San Francisco Concert (1977)	Romeo & Juliet (1977)

The San Francisco Concert is a live album by flautist Hubert Laws recorded at the Paramount Theatre in California in 1975 and released in 1977 on the CTI label.

== Reception ==
The Allmusic review by Scott Yanow awarded the album 3 stars stating "This live set finds flutist Hubert Laws both looking backwards toward his best CTI recordings and ahead to his generally abysmal output for Columbia... Backed by a huge string orchestra, Laws plays quite well, uplifting the material and doing what he can with the charts".

Professional ratings
Review scores
Source	Rating
Allmusic	3/5 stars

== Track listing ==
1. "Modadji" (Dave Grusin) - 12:09
2. "Feel Like Making Love" (Eugene McDaniels) - 6:16
3. "Farandole" (Georges Bizet) - 10:55
4. "Scheherazade" (Nikolai Rimsky-Korsakov) - 8:18

== Personnel ==
- Hubert Laws - flute
- Bob James - electric piano, arranger, conductor
- Glen Deardorff - guitar
- Gary King - bass
- Harvey Mason - drums
- Nathan Rubin, Virginia Baker, Myra Bucky, Anne Crowden, Ardeen De Camp, Beth Gibson; Alexander Horvath, Daniel Kobialka, Donna Lerew, Greg Mazmanian, Zaven Melikian, Carl Pedersen, Ruggiero Pelosi, Judith Poska, Frances Schorr, Verne Sellin - violin
- Arthur Bauch, Hope Bauch, Don Ehrlich, Nancy Ellis, Thomas Heimberg, Albert White - viola
- Terry Adams, Joel Cohen, Richard Eade, Mary Anne Meredith, Margaret Moores, Amy Radner - cello
- Michelle Burr, Jeffrey Neighbor - string bass
- Randall Pratt - harp
- Stuart Gronningen, Jeremy Merrill - French horn
- Frederick Berry, Oscar Brashear, Allen Smith, Snooky Young - trumpet
- George Bohanon, Daniel Livesay - trombone
- Maurice Spears - bass trombone
