= In Concert Volume Two (Freddie Hubbard & Stanley Turrentine album) =

Live album by Freddie Hubbard, Herbie Hancock & Stanley Turrentine
- Released: 1973
- Recorded: March 3–4, 1973
- Genre: Jazz
- Label: CTI
- Producer: Creed Taylor

Freddie Hubbard chronology
Freddie Hubbard/Stanley Turrentine In Concert Volume One (1973)	In Concert Volume Two (1973)	Keep Your Soul Together (1974)

Stanley Turrentine chronology
Freddie Hubbard/Stanley Turrentine In Concert Volume One (1973)	In Concert Volume Two (1973)	Don't Mess with Mister T. (1973)

Professional ratings
Review scores
Source	Rating
Allmusic	3/5 stars

In Concert Volume Two is a live album recorded in 1973 by jazz trumpeter Freddie Hubbard, pianist Herbie Hancock and tenor saxophonist Stanley Turrentine. It was recorded in Chicago and Detroit for Creed Taylor's CTI label and features performances by Hubbard, Turrentine, Hancock, guitarist Eric Gale, bassist Ron Carter and drummer Jack DeJohnette.

== Track listing ==
1. "Hornets" [Chicago Version] - 9:40
2. "Interlude" - 1:17
3. "Hornets" [Detroit Version] - 9:47
4. "Gilbraltar" [Detroit Version] (Hubbard) - 21:09

All compositions by Herbie Hancock except as indicated
- Recorded at the "Chicago Opera House", Chicago, on March 3 (tracks 1 & 2) and the "Ford Auditorium", Detroit on March 4 (tracks 3 & 4), 1973

== Personnel ==
- Freddie Hubbard - trumpet
- Stanley Turrentine - tenor saxophone
- Herbie Hancock - piano
- Eric Gale - guitar
- Ron Carter - bass
- Jack DeJohnette - drums
