= Courage (Milton Nascimento album) =

Studio album by Milton Nascimento
- Released: 1969
- Recorded: December 19, 1968 and February 26 & 27, 1969
- Studios: Van Gelder, Englewood Cliffs, NJ
- Genre: Jazz
- Length: 33:45
- Labels: A&M/CTI; SP 3019
- Producer: Creed Taylor

Milton Nascimento chronology
Milton Nascimento (Travessia) (1967)	Courage (1969)	Milton Nascimento (1969)

Courage is the second studio album by Brazilian singer-songwriter and guitarist Milton Nascimento, recorded in 1968 and released in 1969 by CTI Records.

== Reception ==
Professional ratings
Review scores
Source	Rating
AllMusic	5/5 stars
The Rolling Stone Album Guide	3/5 stars

AllMusic called the album "a masterpiece, a gorgeously executed tour through his early songs... To some admirers, Courage remains his best record, period".

== Track listing ==
1. "Bridges (Travessia)" (Milton Nascimento, Fernando Brant, Gene Lees) - 3:52
2. "Vera Cruz" - 3:12 (Nascimento, Márcio Borges)
3. "Tres Pontas" - 2:45 (Nascimento, Ronaldo Bastos)
4. "Outubro (October)" (Nascimento, Brant) - 4:12
5. "Courage" (Nascimento, Paul Williams, Borges) - 3:25
6. "Rio Vermelho" (Danilo Caymmi, Nascimento, Bastos) - 3:23
7. "Gira, Girou (Round and Round)" - 3:26 (Nascimento, Borges)
8. "Morro Velho" - 4:28 (Nascimento)
9. "Catavento" - 2:31 (Nascimento)
10. "Canção do Sal (Saltworkers Song)" - 3:07 (Nascimento)
- Recorded at Van Gelder Studio in Englewood Cliffs, New Jersey, on December 19, 1968 (tracks 1, 3, 4 & 8), February 26 (tracks 2, 6, 7 & 10), and February 27 (tracks 5, 8 & 9), 1969

== Personnel ==
- Milton Nascimento - vocals and guitar
- Wayne Andre, Paul Faulise, John Messner, Tony Studd, Bill Watrous, Chauncey Welsch - trombone
- Burt Collins, Marvin Stamm - flugelhorn
- Ray Alonge, Joe DeAngelis, Paul Ingraham - French horn
- George Marge - clarinet
- Danny Bank, Harvey Estrin, Hubert Laws, Romeo Penque, Jerome Richardson, Bill Slapin, Joe Soldo - flute
- Herbie Hancock - piano
- Eumir Deodato - organ, arranger, conductor
- Jose Marino - bass
- João Palma - drums
- Airto Moreira - percussion
- David Nadien, Anahid Ajemian, Frederick Buldrini, Alexander Cores, Harry Cykman, Lewis Eley, Harry Glickman, Emanuel Green, Raoul Poliakin, Max Pollikoff, Matthew Raimondi, Joyce Robbins, Tosha Samaroff, Avram Weiss, Jack Zatde, Joseph Zwilich - violin
- Alfred Brown, Harold Coletta, Theodore Israel, David Mankovitz, Emanuel Vardi - viola
- Charles McCracken, George Ricci, Lucien Schmit, Alan Shulman - cello
- Anamaria Valle - vocal

Technical

- Pete Turner - photography
