= Macho (album) =

Studio album by Gábor Szabó
- Released: 1975
- Recorded: April 3, 4, 5, 7 & 8, 1975
- Studio: Kendun Recorders, Burbank, California
- Genre: Jazz, Jazz-funk
- Length: 37:40
- Label: Salvation; SAL 704S1
- Producer: Bob James

Gábor Szabó chronology
Rambler (1974)	Macho (1975)	Nightflight (1976)

Macho is an album by Hungarian guitarist Gábor Szabó featuring performances recorded in 1975 and released on the Salvation label.

== Reception ==
The Allmusic review states "This is a tough, streetwise, commercial jazz album that has plenty to offer to anyone with an open mind. In the pocket, groove-soaked, and flawlessly executed".

Professional ratings
Review scores
Source	Rating
Allmusic	3/5 stars

== Track listing ==
All compositions by Gábor Szabó except as indicated

1. "Hungarian Rhapsody No. 2" (Franz Liszt) - 6:56
2. "Time" - 5:41
3. "Transylvania Boogie" (Bob James) - 5:37
4. "Ziggidy Zog" (Harvey Mason) - 6:03
5. "Macho" - 9:16
6. "Poetry Man" (Phoebe Snow) - 4:32
7. "Evening in the Country" - 5:24 Bonus track on CD reissue
8. "Macho" [alternate take] - 11:27 Bonus track on CD reissue

- Recorded at Kendun Recorders in Burbank, California on April 3, 4, 5, 7 & 8, 1975

== Personnel ==
- Gábor Szabó, Eric Gale - guitar
- Bob James - keyboards, arranger, conductor
- Ian Underwood - synthesizer
- Tom Scott - tenor saxophone, lyricon
- John Faddis - trumpet
- George Bohanon - trombone
- Louis Johnson - bass
- Scott Edwards - electric bass
- Harvey Mason - drums, arranger
- Bobbye Hall, Idris Muhammad, Ralph MacDonald - percussion
