= Olinga (album) =

Studio album by Milt Jackson
- Released: 1974
- Recorded: January 9–10, 1974
- Studio: Van Gelder Studio, Englewood Cliffs, NJ
- Genre: Jazz
- Length: 46:54
- Label: CTI
- Producer: Creed Taylor

Milt Jackson chronology
Goodbye (1974)	Olinga (1974)	The Last Concert (1975)

Olinga is an album by vibraphonist Milt Jackson recorded in 1974 and released on the CTI label.

== Reception ==
The Allmusic review by Scott Yanow awarded the album 3 stars stating "this set features vibraphonist Milt Jackson with some of his favorite musicians... The performances are pretty straight-ahead for CTI... Although Cedar Walton does not sound as formidable on electric piano as on acoustic and the other solos overall are a bit safe, this is a nice album".

Professional ratings
Review scores
Source	Rating
Allmusic	3/5 stars

== Track listing ==
All compositions by Milt Jackson except where noted

1. "Olinga" (Dizzy Gillespie) - 3:47
2. "Re-Rev" (Jimmy Heath, Jackson) - 6:08
3. "The Metal Melter" (Heath, Jackson) - 6:19
4. "The Steel Bender" - 5:27
5. "Lost April" (Eddie DeLange, Emil Newman, Hubert Spencer) - 4:35
6. "I'm Not So Sure" (Cedar Walton) - 8:35
7. "The Metal Melter" [alternate take] (Heath, Jackson) - 6:13 Bonus track on CD reissue
8. "The Steel Bender" [alternate take] - 5:10 Bonus track on CD reissue
- Recorded at Van Gelder Studio in Englewood Cliffs, New Jersey on January 9 & 10, 1974

== Personnel ==
- Milt Jackson – vibes
- Jimmy Heath – soprano saxophone
- Cedar Walton – piano
- Ron Carter – bass
- Mickey Roker – drums
- Arnold Black, Harry Cykman, Max Ellen, Emanuel Green, Harold Kohon, Harry Lookofsky, David Nadien, Irving Spice – violin (tracks 1 & 5)
- Jesse Levy, Charles McCracken, George Ricci, Alan Shulman – cello (tracks 1 & 5)
- Bob James – arranger, conductor (tracks 1 & 5)
