= Keep Your Soul Together =

Studio album by Freddie Hubbard
- Released: 1974
- Recorded: October 1973
- Studios: Van Gelder Studio, Englewood Cliffs, New Jersey
- Genre: Jazz fusion
- Length: 38:35
- Label: CTI
- Producer: Creed Taylor

Freddie Hubbard chronology
In Concert Volume Two (1973)	Keep Your Soul Together (1974)	Polar AC (1974)

Professional ratings
Review scores
Source	Rating
Allmusic	4/5 stars
The Rolling Stone Jazz Record Guide	2/5 stars
DownBeat	5/5 stars

Keep Your Soul Together is an album recorded in 1973 by jazz trumpeter Freddie Hubbard. It was his fifth studio album released on Creed Taylor's CTI label, and features performances by Hubbard, Junior Cook, George Cables, Aurell Ray, Kent Brinkley, Ron Carter, Ralph Penland and Juno Lewis.

== Reception ==
Eric Kriss gave the album 5 stars in his DownBeat review. Kriss wrote of the album, "It’s representative of the music Hubbard is playing live and it illustrates why his influence has been so deeply felt". Kriss also singled out the contributions of Cables and Cook.

== Track listing ==
1. "Brigitte" - 9:10
2. "Keep Your Soul Together" - 9:55
3. "Spirits of Trane" - 9:10
4. "Destiny's Children" - 10:20
5. "Keep Your Soul Together" - 14:20 [CD bonus track]

All compositions by Freddie Hubbard.

== Personnel ==
- Freddie Hubbard - trumpet
- Junior Cook - tenor saxophone
- George Cables - electric piano
- Aurell Ray - guitar
- Kent Brinkley - bass
- Ron Carter - electric bass
- Ralph Penland - drums
- Juno Lewis - percussion

== Charts ==
Chart performance for Keep Your Soul Together
Chart (1974)	Peak position
US Billboard 200	186
US Top R&B/Hip-Hop Albums (Billboard)	36
