= Fuse One =

American jazz ensemble

Fuse One was a group of jazz musicians who collaborated for two albums released on CTI Records and one album released on GNP Crescendo Records.

The albums Fuse One and Silk were produced by Creed Taylor. The first album was arranged by Jeremy Wall of Spyro Gyra, the second by Leon "Ndugu" Chancler of Weather Report and the third by David Matthews.

Membership was not concrete, but included Tony Williams, Joe Farrell, John McLaughlin, Stanley Turrentine, Wynton Marsalis, Larry Coryell, Lenny White, Paulinho Da Costa, Ronnie Foster, Stanley Clarke, George Benson, Todd Cochran, Leon "Ndugu" Chancler, Tom Browne, Dave Valentin, Jorge Dalto, and Eric Gale.

The liner notes to their first album described the group thus: "Fuse One is conceived as a forum in which major contemporary musicians perform according to their own musical disciplines and without the constraints that accompany leader responsibilities. Each player brings in new compositions and ideas."

== Discography ==
=== Studio albums ===
Rel.	Title	Rec.	Label	Formats	Notes
1980	Fuse One	1980	CTI Records	LP, CD	-
1981	Silk	1981	CTI Records	LP, CD	-
1984	Ice	1984	Electric Bird	LP, CD	-

=== Compilation albums ===
Rel.	Title	Rec.	Label	Formats	Notes
1989	Fuse One: The Complete Recordings	1980-1981	Music Masters Records	CD	Contains first two albums Fuse One and Silk
