= She Was Too Good to Me =

Studio album by Chet Baker
- Released: 1974
- Recorded: July 17, October 31 & November 1, 1974
- Studio: Van Gelder Studio, Englewood Cliffs, NJ
- Genre: Jazz
- Length: 41:02
- Label: CTI Records
- Producer: Creed Taylor

Chet Baker chronology
In Concert (1974)	She Was Too Good to Me (1974)	Carnegie Hall Concert (1974)

She Was Too Good to Me is an album by Chet Baker. The album was released in 1974 as what some would call a "comeback" album. The title track is an alteration of "He Was Too Good to Me". There were three recording sessions (July 17, October 31, and November 1, 1974).

== Track listing ==
She Was Too Good to Me
No.	Title	Writer(s)	Length
1.	"Autumn Leaves"	Joseph Kosma, Jacques Prévert, Johnny Mercer	7:02
2.	"She Was Too Good to Me"	Richard Rodgers, Lorenz Hart	4:40
3.	"Funk in Deep Freeze"	Hank Mobley	6:06
4.	"Tangerine"	Victor Schertzinger, Johnny Mercer	5:27
5.	"With a Song in My Heart"	Richard Rodgers, Lorenz Hart	4:04
6.	"What'll I Do"	Irving Berlin	3:55
7.	"It's You or No One"	Jule Styne, Sammy Cahn	4:28
8.	"My Future Just Passed"	Richard A. Whiting, George Marion Jr.	4:46

== Personnel ==
- Chet Baker – trumpet, vocals
- Hubert Laws – flute and alto flute
- Bob James – electric piano
- Ron Carter – bass
- Steve Gadd – drums on "Autumn Leaves", "She Was Too Good to Me", "Funk in Deep Freeze", "Tangerine", "My Future Just Passed"
- Jack DeJohnette – drums on "With a Song in My Heart", "What'll I Do?", "It's You or No One"
- Paul Desmond – alto saxophone on "Autumn Leaves", "Tangerine"
- Romeo Penque – flute, clarinet
- George Marge – alto flute, oboe d'amore
- David Friedman – vibes
- Don Sebesky – arrangements
- Rudy Van Gelder – engineer, recorder
