= Salt Song =

Studio album by Stanley Turrentine
- Released: 1971
- Recorded: July 7 & 13, and April 23, 1971
- Studio: Van Gelder Studio, Englewood Cliffs, NJ
- Genre: Jazz
- Length: 42:35
- Label: CTI; CTI 6010
- Producer: Creed Taylor

Stanley Turrentine chronology
The Sugar Man (1971)	Salt Song (1971)	Cherry (1972)

Salt Song is an album by jazz saxophonist Stanley Turrentine recorded for the CTI Note label featuring performances by Turrentine with an orchestra arranged by Eumir Deodato. The CD rerelease added another track.

== Reception ==
The Allmusic review by Steve Huey awarded the album 4 stars and states "it's another fine, eclectic outing that falls squarely into the signature CTI fusion sound: smooth but not slick, accessible but not simplistic... All in all, Salt Song has dated well, partly because the arrangements don't overemphasize electric piano, but mostly on the strength of Turrentine's always-soulful playing".

Professional ratings
Review scores
Source	Rating
Allmusic	4/5 stars

== Track listing ==
1. "Gibraltar" (Freddie Hubbard) – 10:21
2. "I Told Jesus" (traditional, arranged by Eumir Deodato) – 7:40
3. "Salt Song" (Milton Nascimento) – 7:17
4. "I Haven't Got Anything Better to Do" (Lee Pockriss, Paul Vance) – 4:37
5. "Storm" (Stanley Turrentine) – 7:36
6. "Vera Cruz" (Nascimento) – 5:04 Bonus track on CD

Recorded on July 7 & 13 (tracks 1–5) and April 23, 1971 (track 6).

== Personnel ==
- Stanley Turrentine – tenor saxophone
- Eumir Deodato – electric piano, arranger, conductor
- Ron Carter – bass
- Airto Moreira – drums, percussion
- Horace Parlan, Richard Tee – piano, electric piano, organ (tracks 1–5)
- Eric Gale – electric guitar (tracks 1–5)
- Billy Cobham – drums (tracks 1–5)
- Julius Brand, Paul Gershman, Julius Held, Leo Kahn, Harry Katzman, Joe Malin – violin (tracks 2–5)
- Harold Coletta – viola (tracks 2–5)
- Charles McCracken, Alan Shulman – cello (tracks 2–5)
- Hubert Laws, George Marge, Romeo Penque, Jerome Richardson – flute (track 6)
- Sivuca – guitar (track 6)
- Russell George – bass (track 6)
- Joao Palma, Dom Um Romão – drums, percussion (track 6)
- Margaret Branch, Brenda Bryant, Patsy Smith – vocals (tracks 2 & 5)
