= Freddie Hubbard/Stanley Turrentine in Concert Volume One =

Freddie Hubbard/Stanley Turrentine In Concert Volume One

Live album by Freddie Hubbard & Stanley Turrentine
- Released: 1973
- Recorded: March 3–4, 1973
- Genre: Jazz
- Length: 38:42
- Label: CTI
- Producer: Creed Taylor

Freddie Hubbard chronology
Sky Dive (1972)	Freddie Hubbard/Stanley Turrentine In Concert Volume One (1973)	In Concert Volume Two (1973)

Stanley Turrentine chronology
Cherry (1972)	Freddie Hubbard/Stanley Turrentine In Concert Volume One (1973)	In Concert Volume Two (1973)

Professional ratings
Review scores
Source	Rating
Allmusic	3/5 stars

Freddie Hubbard/Stanley Turrentine In Concert Volume One is a live album recorded in 1973 by jazz trumpeter Freddie Hubbard and tenor saxophonist Stanley Turrentine. It was recorded in Chicago and Detroit for Creed Taylor's CTI label and features performances by Hubbard, Turrentine, guitarist Eric Gale, bassist Ron Carter, drummer Jack DeJohnette and pianist Herbie Hancock.

== Reception ==
Scott Yanow of Allmusic stated "This LP pairs trumpeter Freddie Hubbard and tenor-saxophonist Stanley Turrentine, two very individual players who always brought out the best in each other. They stretch out on long versions of "Povo" and "Gibraltar" that clock in around 19 minutes apiece. The backup rhythm section (guitarist Eric Gale, keyboardist Herbie Hancock, bassist Ron Carter, and drummer Jack DeJohnette) is a major asset and inspires the two horns to play reasonably creative solos."

Syd Fablo of Rock Salted wrote "A really, really good — if strangely overlooked — live jazz fusion album, comparable to Cannonball Adderley‘s The Black Messiah and Donald Byrd‘s Ethiopian Knights, which is to say this is not formally or stylistically innovative but everybody involved delivers superb performances with a focus on warmth and heart. There also is an equally good Volume Two, on which Herbie Hancock shares top billing — strangely, because he plays on both volumes, but also not so strangely given the commonalities this music shares with his own Mwandishi group. As fusion was starting to drift into bland mediocrity, this is something else entirely, a vibrant, energetic and likable rock-inflected electric jazz performance that sidesteps the sort of pandering that usually goes hand-in-hand with fusion from this point onward. There are overt signs of structure, and efforts to make the performances sound proper and professional, but there is always a hint of something unruly and dangerous lurking behind every note. It is that sense of double meaning that makes this more than just a funky good time (which it also is)."

== Track listing ==
All compositions by Freddie Hubbard

1. "Povo" - 19:23
2. "Gibraltar" - 19:19

"Gibraltar" was recorded March 3, 1973 at the Chicago Opera House.
"Povo" was recorded March 4, 1973 at the Ford Auditorium in Detroit.

== Personnel ==
- Freddie Hubbard - trumpet
- Stanley Turrentine - tenor saxophone
- Herbie Hancock - electric piano
- Eric Gale - guitar
- Ron Carter - bass
- Jack DeJohnette - drums
