= Rambler (Gábor Szabó album) =

Studio album by Gábor Szabó
- Released: 1973
- Recorded: September 1973
- Studio: Van Gelder Studio, Englewood Cliffs, New Jersey
- Genre: Jazz
- Length: 33:10
- Label: CTI; CTI 6026
- Producer: Creed Taylor

Gábor Szabó chronology
Mizrab (1972)	Rambler (1973)	Macho (1975)

Rambler is an album by Hungarian guitarist Gábor Szabó featuring performances recorded in 1973 and released on the CTI label.

== Reception ==
The Allmusic review states "For what would be Szabo's last significant recording, the Hungarian guitarist performs an obscurity and five of bassist Melz's originals... Although the individual melodies are not that memorable (none caught on), Gabor Szabo's distinctive sound and logical improvisations make this an album worth searching for".

Professional ratings
Review scores
Source	Rating
Allmusic	3/5 stars
The Rolling Stone Jazz Record Guide	1/5 stars

== Track listing ==
All compositions by Wolfgang Melz except as indicated

1. "Rambler" - 5:25
2. "So Hard to Say Goodbye" - 4:42
3. "New Love" - 6:21
4. "Reinhardt" - 6:55
5. "Help Me Build a Lifetime" - 4:27
6. "All Is Well" (Robert Lamm) - 5:20

- Recorded at Van Gelder Studio in Englewood Cliffs, New Jersey in September 1973

== Personnel ==
- Gábor Szabó - guitar
- Bob James - piano, organ, synthesizer, musical supervision
- Mike Wofford - electric piano
- Wolfgang Melz - bass
- Bobby Morin - drums
- Unknown - percussion
