= White Rabbit (George Benson album) =

Studio album by George Benson
- Released: 1971
- Recorded: November 23, 24 & 30, 1971
- Studio: Van Gelder Studio, Englewood Cliffs, NJ
- Genre: Jazz
- Length: 36:18
- Label: CTI Records (CTI 6015)
- Producer: Creed Taylor

George Benson chronology
Beyond the Blue Horizon (1971)	White Rabbit (1971)	Body Talk (1973)

Professional ratings
Review scores
Source	Rating
Allmusic	4/5 stars
The Rolling Stone Jazz Record Guide	2/5 stars

White Rabbit is an album by George Benson. The title track is a cover of the famous Jefferson Airplane song.This album was George Benson's second CTI Records project produced by Creed Taylor and was recorded nine months after Beyond the Blue Horizon.

== Background ==
"White Rabbit" was described at Billboard as "a dynamic pop-packed jazz LP with two extraordinary works "California Dreaming" and "White Rabbit"". For this project Creed Taylor and Don Sebesky used the formula that gave them good results in other recordings with Verve Records and A&M Records: two successful rock/pop songs covers from The Mamas and the Papas and Jefferson Airplane, music from a well-known soundtrack like "The Summer Knows" ("Theme from Summer of '42) of Michel Legrand, a jazzy version of a classical Brazilian song "Little train" from Heitor Villa-Lobos "Brachianas Basileiras No.2" and an original George Benson composition, "El Mar" . In all tracks featuring Herbie Hancock, Ron Carter, Billy Cobham, Airto Moreira, Jay Berliner, Hubert Laws plus nine studio musicians playing at different wind instruments and harp arrangements. This album was the recorded debut of a guitarist, Earl Klugh, only 17 years old by then, featuring on "El Mar".

Interviewed by Jeff Tamarkin at "Music & Musicians", answering a question about the choice of Jefferson Airplane's song for this album, Benson said: "I had never heard of it before. I’d never even heard of the group! It sounded so bizarre, as opposed to what I wanted to do. But I have never run away from a challenge." The track that named the album was Don Sebesky's initiative as he recognized to Marc Myers in an interview at "JazzWax", after listening to Jefferson Airplane's record Surrealistic Pillow, which was released by RCA Records in 1967 and he brought the proposal of the album to Creed Taylor: "I suggested we do White Rabbit in a Spanish mode. He agreed. George Benson doesn’t read music. He just heard the song and automatically fell into the groove. It shows you that music doesn’t exist on the page, only in the air."

Benson told at the interview with Tamarkin that "The White Rabbit album was very exciting—it was an adventure. I really enjoyed doing that stuff", nevertheless Didier C. Deutsch cited at the booklet of the CD digitally remastered, released in 1987 by Epic (EPC 450555 2) that Benson didn't like the 'tracking' process followed by CTI for this album, by means of a studio technique where the soloist, rhythm section, and background ingredients are recorded separately with overdubbing made afterwards.

== Reception and critics ==
The review of this record at Jazz Musical Archives "White Rabbit" is rated as a four stars album considered to be "a slick but interesting album from a great guitarist" where "the sound of guitar dominates, both acoustic and electric". In the opinion of John Kelman in All About Jazz this album "was (and remains) an anomaly in Benson's prodigious catalogue" and to him "White Rabbit" is "a curiosity that transitions between his more mainstream efforts and the soulful jazz/pop star he was about to become".

"White Rabbit" was the first Grammy Award nomination to George Benson in 1972 at the category of "Best Jazz Performance by a Group".

== Album design ==
The original 1971 LP cover was designed by Bob Ciano and features Pete Turner's picture of Pondo tribeswoman that he photographed in South Africa in 1970. George Benson recognized in his autobiography in 2014 that the fact that Creed Taylor didn't put Benson's photo on the cover "was a factor that played to the success of this album".

== Track listing ==
No.	Title	Writer(s)	Length
1.	"White Rabbit"	Grace Slick	6:55
2.	"Theme from Summer of '42"	Michel Legrand	5:08
3.	"Little Train (from Bachianas Brasileiras No.2)"	Heitor Villa-Lobos	5:47
4.	"California Dreamin'"	John Phillips, Michelle Phillips	7:22
5.	"El Mar (The Sea)"	George Benson	10:49

== Personnel ==
- George Benson – electric guitar, solos
- Earl Klugh – acoustic guitar (5)
- Jay Berliner – Spanish guitar
- Herbie Hancock – electric piano
- Ron Carter – electric bass (1, 3), double bass (2, 4, 5)
- Billy Cobham – drums
- Airto Moreira – percussion, vocals
- Phil Kraus – vibraphone, percussion
- Gloria Agostini – harp

Woodwinds

- Hubert Laws – flute, alto flute, piccolo, flute solo (1)
- Phil Bodner – flute, alto flute, oboe, English horn
- George Marge – flute, alto flute, clarinet, oboe, English horn
- Romeo Penque – alto flute, clarinet, bass clarinet, oboe, English horn
- Jane Taylor – bassoon

Brass

- John Frosk – trumpet, flugelhorn, trumpet solo (1, 5)
- Alan Rubin – trumpet, flugelhorn
- Wayne Andre – trombone, baritone horn
- Jim Buffington – French horn

== Production ==
- Creed Taylor – producer
- Didier C. Deutsch – producer (CD 1987)
- Rudy Van Gelder – engineer
- Frank Decker – engineer (CD 1987)
- Don Sebesky – arrangements
- Pete Turner – cover photography
- Bob Ciano – album design
