= In Concert-Carnegie Hall =

Live album by George Benson
- Released: 1976
- Recorded: January 11, 1975
- Venue: Carnegie Hall, New York City
- Genre: Jazz
- Length: 42:01
- Label: CTI
- Producer: Creed Taylor

George Benson chronology
Bad Benson (1974)	In Concert-Carnegie Hall (1976)	Good King Bad (1976)

In Concert-Carnegie Hall is a live album by American guitarist George Benson featuring a performance recorded at Carnegie Hall in 1975 and released on the CTI label in 1976. The CD reissue added one bonus track and reordered the selections as presented in concert.

== Reception ==
The Allmusic review states " this is a solid "live" effort with Benson cooking on all burners... In retrospect, listening to this record in the 21st century, it's difficult to imagine Benson making the switch from a classy guitar firebrand to a pop star so quickly".

Professional ratings
Review scores
Source	Rating
Allmusic	3.5/5 stars
The Rolling Stone Jazz Record Guide	3/5 stars

== Track listing ==
All compositions by George Benson except as indicated

1. Introduction – 1:17 Bonus track on CD reissue
2. "Take Five" (Paul Desmond) – 5:37
3. "Summertime" (George Gershwin, DuBose Heyward) – 7:24
4. "Gone" – 10:28
5. "Sky Dive" (Freddie Hubbard) – 6:57 Bonus track on CD reissue
6. "Octane" – 10:16

== Personnel ==
- George Benson – guitar, vocals
- Hubert Laws – flute
- Ronnie Foster – keyboards
- Wayne Dockery – bass
- Marvin Chappell – drums
- Bernard Fennell – cello

Overdubbed:

- Johnny Griggs, Ray Armando – percussion
- Will Lee – bass
- Steve Gadd, Andy Newmark – drums
- Unknown string section arranged and conducted by David Matthews
