= Goodbye (Milt Jackson album) =

Milt Jackson album

Studio album by Milt Jackson
- Released: 1974
- Recorded: December 12, 1972 and December 1973
- Genre: Jazz
- Length: 36:44
- Label: CTI
- Producer: Creed Taylor

Milt Jackson chronology
Blues on Bach (1974)	Goodbye (1974)	Olinga (1974)

Goodbye is an album by vibraphonist Milt Jackson recorded in 1973 (with one track from 1972) and released on the CTI label.

== Reception ==
The Allmusic review by Thom Jurek awarded the album 3 stars stating "Milt Jackson's second entry on the CTI label is also one of its highlights. This is one of Creed Taylor's finest productions both in terms of material and sidemen".

Professional ratings
Review scores
Source	Rating
Allmusic	3/5 stars

== Track listing ==
All compositions by Milt Jackson except as indicated

1. "Detour Ahead" (Lou Carter, Herb Ellis, Johnny Frigo) - 8:00
2. "Goodbye" (Gordon Jenkins) - 9:21
3. "Old Devil Moon" (E. Y. Harburg, Burton Lane) - 5:50
4. "S.K.J." - 6:47
5. "Opus de Funk" (Horace Silver) - 6:46

- Recorded at Rudy Van Gelder Studio in Englewood Cliffs, New Jersey on December 12, 1972 (track 4) and December, 1973 (tracks 1, 2, 3 & 5)

== Personnel ==
- Milt Jackson – vibes
- Ron Carter - bass
- Freddie Hubbard (track 4) - trumpet
- Hubert Laws (tracks 1, 2, 3 & 5) - flute
- Cedar Walton (tracks 1, 2, 3 & 5); Herbie Hancock (track 4) - piano
- Steve Gadd (tracks 1, 2, 3 & 5); Billy Cobham (track 4) - drums
