= Fingers (album) =

Studio album by Airto
- Released: 1973
- Recorded: April 1973
- Studio: Van Gelder Studio, Englewood Cliffs, New Jersey, U.S.
- Genre: Jazz rock, samba jazz, jazz fusion, progressive rock, brazilian music
- Length: 37:23
- Label: CTI
- Producer: Creed Taylor

Airto Moreira chronology
Free (1972)	Fingers (1973)	Virgin Land (1974)

Fingers is a studio album by Brazilian jazz drummer and percussionist Airto Moreira, credited simply as Airto. It was released on CTI Records in 1973. It peaked at number 18 on the Billboard Jazz Albums chart.

== Critical reception ==
Professional ratings
Review scores
Source	Rating
AllMusic	4.5/5 stars
The Rolling Stone Jazz Record Guide	4/5 stars

Alex Henderson of AllMusic gave the album 4.5 out of 5 stars, calling it "consistently enriching." He added, "Fingers is an album to savor."

== Track listing ==
No.	Title	Writer(s)	Length
1.	"Fingers (El Rada)"	Ruben Rada; Eduardo Uzeta	4:30
2.	"Romance of Death"	Hugo Fattoruso	5:35
3.	"Merry-Go-Round"	Airto Moreira; Flora Purim	2:40
4.	"Wind Chant"	Fattoruso	5:45
5.	"Parana"	Fattoruso	6:00
6.	"San Francisco River"	Purim	4:05
7.	"Tombo in 7/4"	Moreira Fattoruso	6:20
Total length:			37:23

== Personnel ==
Credits adapted from liner notes.

- Airto – drums, percussion, vocals
- Hugo Fattoruso – keyboards, harmonica, vocals
- David Amaro – acoustic guitar, electric guitar
- Ringo Thielmann – double bass, vocals
- Jorge Osvaldo Fattoruso – drums, vocals
- Flora Purim – percussion, vocals
- Creed Taylor – production
- Rudy Van Gelder – engineering
- Pete Turner – photography
- Alen MacWeeney – photography
- Rob Ciano – design

== Charts ==
Chart	Peak position
US Jazz Albums (Billboard)	18
