= Giant Box =

Studio album by Don Sebesky
- Released: 1973
- Recorded: April and May 1973
- Studio: Van Gelder Studio, Englewood Cliffs, NJ
- Genre: Jazz
- Length: 59:31
- Label: CTI; CTI 6031/32
- Producer: Creed Taylor

Don Sebesky chronology
Distant Galaxy (1972)	Giant Box (1973)	The Rape of El Morro (1975)

Giant Box is a double album by American arranger/conductor and composer Don Sebesky recorded in 1973 and released on the CTI label.

== Reception ==
The Allmusic review states "This may have been Creed Taylor's most ambitious single project... Thankfully the musicmaking lives up to the billing. Everything that gave CTI its distinctive sound and identity is here – the classical adaptations, elaborate orchestrations and structuring, pop-tune covers, plenty of room for the star soloists to stretch out in a combo format... Giant Box still ranks as a sensational coup and a reminder of how potent CTI was at its peak". All About Jazz reviewer Dan Bilwasky said "While Giant Box is indicative of the bigger-is-better approach of the times, it also serves as a benchmark for creativity in arranging and composition, and helps to place Sebesky's talents in the proper light".

Professional ratings
Review scores
Source	Rating
Allmusic	4.5/5 stars
The Rolling Stone Jazz Record Guide	2/5 stars

== Track listing ==
All compositions by Don Sebesky except where noted

1. "Firebird/Birds of Fire" (Igor Stravinsky/John McLaughlin) – 13:57
2. "Song to a Seagull" (Joni Mitchell) – 5:49
3. "Free as a Bird" – 8:16
4. "Psalm 150" (Jimmy Webb) – 8:10
5. "Vocalise" (Sergei Rachmaninoff) – 5:40
6. "Fly/Circles" – 9:49
7. "Semi-Tough" – 7:50

== Personnel ==
- Don Sebesky – electric piano, organ, clavinet, accordion, arranger, conductor
- Freddie Hubbard – trumpet
- Grover Washington, Jr. – alto saxophone
- George Benson – electric guitar
- Airto Moreira – percussion
- Milt Jackson – vibraphone
- Jackie Cain, Roy Kral – vocals
- Paul Desmond – alto saxophone
- Hubert Laws – soprano saxophone, flute
- Joe Farrell – soprano saxophone
- Ron Carter – bass, electric bass, piccolo bass
- Bob James – organ
- Billy Cobham, Jack DeJohnette – drums
- Randy Brecker, Alan Rubin, Joe Shepley – trumpet, flugelhorn
- Garnett Brown – trombone
- Wayne Andre, Warren Covington – trombone, baritone horn
- Paul Faulise, Alan Raph – bass trombone, baritone horn
- Jim Buffington, Earl Chapin – French horn
- Tony Price – tuba
- Walt Levinsky – tenor saxophone, clarinet
- Phil Bodner – soprano saxophone, clarinet, flute, piccolo
- George Marge – soprano saxophone, baritone saxophone, clarinet, flute, oboe, English horn
- Romeo Penque – soprano saxophone, clarinet, flute, piccolo, oboe, English horn
- Rubens Bassini – conga
- Dave Friedman, Phil Kraus, Ralph MacDonald, Airto Moreira – percussion
- Alfred Brown, Harry Cykman, Max Ellen, Paul Gershman, Harry Glickman, Emanuel Green, Harold Kohon, Charles Libove, Harry Lookofsky, Joe Malin, David Nadien, Gene Orloff, Elliot Rosoff, Irving Spice – violin
- Seymour Barab, Charles McCracken, George Ricci, Alan Shulman – cello
- Homer Mensch – bass
- Margaret Ross – harp
- Lani Groves, Carl Caldwell, Tasha Thomas – vocals
- Bob Ciano – album design
