= Free (Airto album) =

Studio album by Airto Moreira
- Released: October 24, 1972
- Recorded: March 23 and April 12, 13, and 20, 1972
- Studios: Van Gelder Studio, Englewood Cliffs, New Jersey
- Genres: Jazz, Brazilian jazz, Jazz fusion, Jazz rock
- Length: 47:23
- Label: CTI
- Producer: Creed Taylor

Airto Moreira chronology
Seeds on the Ground (1971)	Free (1972)	Fingers (1973)

Free is an album by Brazilian jazz drummer and percussionist Airto Moreira (who was credited as "Airto") with performances recorded in 1972. The album was released by CTI Records and reached No. 30 on the jazz album chart at Billboard magazine.

== Reception ==
Professional ratings
Review scores
Source	Rating
AllMusic	5/5 stars
The Rolling Stone Jazz Record Guide	4/5 stars

At AllMusic, critic Scott Yanow writes that the album combines "jazz, Brazilian music, and aspects of fusion and funk quite successfully."

== Track listing ==
No.	Title	Writer(s)	Length
1.	"Return to Forever"	Chick Corea	10:17
2.	"Flora's Song"	Flora Purim	8:30
3.	"Free"	Moreira	11:50
4.	"Lucky Southern"	Keith Jarrett	2:36
5.	"Creek (Arroio)"	Victor Brazil	6:12
6.	"So Tender"	Jarrett	5:01
7.	"Jequié"	Moacir Santos	2:57

== Personnel ==
Adapted from AllMusic

- Airto Moreira – percussion, vocals
- Burt Collins – trumpet, flugelhorn
- Mel Davis – trumpet, flugelhorn
- Alan Rubin – trumpet, flugelhorn
- Wayne Andre – trombone
- Garnett Brown – trombone
- Joe Wallace – trombone
- Joe Farrell – soprano saxophone, alto and bass flutes, piccolo
- Hubert Laws – flute
- Nelson Ayres – electric piano
- Chick Corea – piano, electric piano
- Keith Jarrett – piano
- George Benson – guitar
- Jay Berliner – guitar
- Ron Carter – double bass
- Stanley Clarke – bass guitar
- Flora Purim – vocals
- Don Sebesky – arranger

== Charts ==
Year	Chart	Peak position
1973	Billboard's Jazz Albums	30
