= CTI Records =

American record label

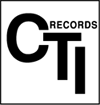
- Founded: 1967
- Founder: Creed Taylor
- Distributors: Sony (US), King Records (Japan)
- Genre: Jazz, jazz fusion
- Country of origin: U.S.
- Location: New York City

CTI Records (Creed Taylor Incorporated) is a jazz record label founded in 1967 by Creed Taylor. CTI was a subsidiary of A&M before becoming independent in 1970. Its first album was A Day in the Life by guitarist Wes Montgomery in 1967. The final release, by the CTI Jazz All-Star Band, was recorded live at the Montreux Jazz Festival in 2009, and released in November 2010 on multiple formats: CD, DVD and Blu-ray.

Its roster included George Benson, Ron Carter, Eumir Deodato, Astrud Gilberto, Freddie Hubbard, Bob James, Antonio Carlos Jobim, Hubert Laws, Airto Moreira, Stanley Turrentine, and Walter Wanderley.

== History ==
Don Sebesky created many of the arrangements for CTI and its subsidiary labels. He was later joined by Bob James and then David Matthews in the mid-1970s. Taylor used Van Gelder Studio in Englewood Cliffs, New Jersey, with Rudy Van Gelder engineering nearly all sessions until the later years of the label. Sessions included Ron Carter, Eric Gale, Herbie Hancock, Bob James, Richard Tee, Billy Cobham, Jack DeJohnette, Steve Gadd, Idris Muhammad, and Harvey Mason.

CTI was commercially successful with certain albums. CTI's best-selling album was Deodato's Prelude, which reached No. 3 on the US Billboard albums chart in 1973. A single from the album, "Also Sprach Zarathustra (2001)", peaked at No. 2 on the US Billboard Hot 100 and No. 7 in the UK. Other successful singles were Bob James' "Feel Like Making Love", and Esther Phillips' "What a Diff'rence a Day Makes", a disco hit.

Successful album releases included Grover Washington, Jr.'s Mister Magic and Feels So Good (both reaching No. 10 in 1975), Esther Phillips' What a Diff'rence a Day Makes (reaching No. 32 in 1975), and Bob James' BJ4 (reaching No. 38 in 1977).

Taylor's productions for CTI helped to establish jazz fusion as a commercially viable musical genre. CTI also became known for its striking album sleeve designs, most of them with images by photographer Pete Turner.

After founding CTI as a jazz label for A & M Records in 1967, Taylor decided to go independent three years later. The company had several subsidiary labels. Kudu Records was established in 1971 and concentrated on soul jazz with albums by Joe Beck, Hank Crawford, Grant Green, Idris Muhammad, Esther Phillips, Johnny "Hammond" Smith, Dr. Lonnie Smith, and Grover Washington Jr. Salvation Records released 10 albums during its existence, including music by Airto, Roland Hanna, Faith Howard, New York Jazz Quartet, Johnny "Hammond" Smith, and Gábor Szabó Greenestreet (which released albums by Jack Wilkins, Claudio Roditi, Les McCann) and Three Brothers (with recordings by The Clams, Lou Christie, Duke Jones, and Cassandra Morgan).

A switch to Motown Records for distribution was to end in difficulties in 1977, with legal and financial problems eventually leading to the label filing for bankruptcy in 1978. CTI, though, remained active until 1984, releasing studio albums by Ray Barretto, Urszula Dudziak, Jim Hall, Roland Hanna, Nina Simone, and the all-star studio band Fuse One

Taylor restructured CTI in 1989, resuming his association with Van Gelder and Turner in June 1989 when recording the all-star session for Rhythmstick, an ambitious album released on vinyl, CD, VHS, and LaserDisc in 1990. Many young musicians were signed to the label, such as Charles Fambrough, Jim Beard, Ted Rosenthal, Bill O'Connell, Donald Harrison, Steve Laury, and Jurgen Friedrich, as well as veteran guitarist Larry Coryell, who collaborated with arranger Don Sebesky on the best-selling Fallen Angel album, which reached No. 18 in the Billboard Top Contemporary Jazz Albums Chart in 1993.

CTI's post-A&M Records catalog (albums released between 1970 and 1979) is owned by Sony and distributed by Masterworks Jazz in the USA. King Records handles the rights for exclusive distribution in Japan. Grover Washington, Jr.'s Kudu albums have been re-issued by Motown and its MoJazz imprint as part of Universal Classics & Jazz. Bob James owns the four albums he recorded for CTI (now managed by Evolution Music Group under license from Tappan Zee, James' record label). Seawind also owns their back catalog of CTI releases. CTI's A&M-subsidiary releases are distributed by Verve, a division of Universal Music Group.

In 2009, Taylor produced a reissue series of twenty CTI titles remastered by Van Gelder for release on SHM-CD format in Japan. New liner notes were provided by Ira Gitler, Arnaldo DeSouteiro, and Doug Payne. Other reissue series came out in December 2013 (including forty titles released on Blu-spec CD format) and in December 2017 with another forty titles on the CTI 50th Anniversary Collection.

== Discography ==
=== 3000 Series ===
The albums comprising the CTI 3000 Series were produced by Creed Taylor between 1967 and 1970 and issued by A&M with a "CTI" logo on the front cover.

Catalog number (mono)	Catalog number (stereo)	Artist	Title
	SP 3000	Various Artists	Audio Master Plus Series Sampler Volume 1
LP 2001	SP 3001	Wes Montgomery	A Day in the Life
LP 2002	SP 3002	Antonio Carlos Jobim	Wave
LP 2003	SP 3003	Herbie Mann	Glory of Love
LP 2004	SP 3004	Tamba 4	We and the Sea
	SP 3005	Nat Adderley	You, Baby
	SP 3006	Wes Montgomery	Down Here on the Ground
	SP 3007	Artie Butler	Have You Met Miss Jones?
	SP 3008	Kai Winding and J. J. Johnson	Israel
	SP 3009	Soul Flutes	Trust in Me
	SP 3010	Richard Barbary	Soul Machine
	SP 3011	Tamiko Jones	I'll Be Anything for You
	SP 3012	Wes Montgomery	Road Song
	SP 3013	Tamba 4	Samba Blim
	SP 3014	George Benson	Shape of Things to Come
	SP 3015	Paul Desmond	Summertime
	SP 3016	Kai Winding and J. J. Johnson	Betwixt & Between
	SP 3017	Nat Adderley	Calling Out Loud
	SP 3018	Walter Wanderley	When It Was Done
	SP 3019	Milton Nascimento	Courage
	SP 3020	George Benson	Tell It Like It Is
	SP 6-3021	Various Artists	Audio Master Plus Series Audio Sampler, Vol. 2
	SP 3022	Walter Wanderley	Moondreams
	SP 3023	Quincy Jones	Walking in Space
	SP 3024	Paul Desmond	From the Hot Afternoon
	SP 3025	George Benson	I Got a Woman and Some Blues
	SP 3026	Hubert Laws	Unissued
	SP 3027	Kai Winding and J. J. Johnson	Stonebone (Originally only issued in Japan; Re-issued as 2020 Record Store Day pressing in Red Vinyl)
	SP 3028	George Benson	The Other Side of Abbey Road
	SP 3030	Quincy Jones	Gula Matari
	SP 3031	Antonio Carlos Jobim	Tide

=== 1000 Series ===
In 1970, Creed Taylor established CTI independently of A&M and issued the first five releases as the 1000 Series which had a green record label. The 1000 Series featured artists working outside of the jazz genre.

Catalog number	Artist	Title
CTI 1001	Kathy McCord	Kathy McCord
CTI 1002	Hubert Laws	Crying Song
CTI 1003	Flow	Flow
CTI 1004	Dave Frishberg	Oklahoma Toad
CTI 1005	Fats Theus	Black Out

=== 6000 series ===
The albums in the CTI 6000 series were released between 1970 and 1976 and featured an orange CTI label with black print, but Quadraphonic issues featured a red label variant. Later albums in the 6000 series were distributed by Motown and are designated by the addition of an S1 to the catalog number.

Catalog number	Artist	Title
CTI 6000	Hubert Laws	Crying Song (Reissue of CTI 1002)
CTI 6001	Freddie Hubbard	Red Clay
CTI 6002	Antonio Carlos Jobim	Stone Flower
CTI 6003	Joe Farrell	Joe Farrell Quartet
CTI 6004	Bill Evans	Montreux II
CTI 6005	Stanley Turrentine	Sugar
CTI 6006	Hubert Laws	Afro-Classic
CTI 6007	Freddie Hubbard	Straight Life
CTI 6008	Astrud Gilberto	Gilberto with Turrentine
CTI 6009	George Benson	Beyond the Blue Horizon
CTI 6010	Stanley Turrentine	Salt Song
CTI 6011	Kenny Burrell	God Bless the Child
CTI 6012	Hubert Laws	The Rite of Spring
CTI 6013	Freddie Hubbard	First Light
CTI 6014	Joe Farrell	Outback
CTI 6015	George Benson	White Rabbit
CTI 6016	Randy Weston	Blue Moses
CTI 6017	Stanley Turrentine with Milt Jackson	Cherry
CTI 6018	Freddie Hubbard	Sky Dive
CTI 6019	Jackie and Roy	Time & Love
CTI 6020	Airto	Free
CTI 6021	Deodato	Prelude
CTI 6022	Hubert Laws	Morning Star
CTI 6023	Joe Farrell	Moon Germs
CTI 6024	Milt Jackson	Sunflower
CTI 6025	Hubert Laws	Carnegie Hall
CTI 6026	Gábor Szabó	Mizrab
CTI 6027	Ron Carter	Blues Farm
CTI 6028	Airto	Fingers
CTI 6029	Deodato	Deodato 2
CTI 6030	Stanley Turrentine	Don't Mess with Mister T.
CTI 6031/32	Don Sebesky	Giant Box
CTI 6033	George Benson	Body Talk
CTI 6034	Joe Farrell	Penny Arcade
CTI 6035	Gábor Szabó	Rambler
CTI 6036	Freddie Hubbard	Keep Your Soul Together
CTI 6037	Ron Carter	All Blues
CTI 6038	Milt Jackson with Hubert Laws	Goodbye
CTI 6039	Paul Desmond featuring Gábor Szabó	Skylark
CTI 6040	Jackie Cain & Roy Kral	A Wilder Alias
CTI 6041	Deodato/Airto	In Concert
CTI 6042S1	Joe Farrell	Upon This Rock
CTI 6043S1	Bob James	One
CTI 6044S1	Freddie Hubbard/Stanley Turrentine	Freddie Hubbard/Stanley Turrentine in Concert Volume One
CTI 6045S1	George Benson	Bad Benson
CTI 6046S1	Milt Jackson	Olinga
CTI 6047S1	Freddie Hubbard	The Baddest Hubbard
CTI 6048S1	Stanley Turrentine	The Baddest Turrentine
CTI 6049S1	Herbie Hancock/Freddie Hubbard/Stanley Turrentine	In Concert Volume Two
CTI 6050S1	Chet Baker	She Was Too Good to Me
CTI 6051S1	Ron Carter	Spanish Blue
CTI 6052S1	Stanley Turrentine	The Sugar Man
CTI 6053S1	Joe Farrell	Canned Funk
CTI 6054S1	Gerry Mulligan / Chet Baker	Carnegie Hall Concert Volume 1
CTI 6055S1	Gerry Mulligan / Chet Baker	Carnegie Hall Concert Volume 2
CTI 6056S1	Freddie Hubbard	Polar AC
CTI 6057S1	Bob James	Two
CTI 6058S1	Hubert Laws	The Chicago Theme
CTI 6059S1	Paul Desmond	Pure Desmond
CTI 6060S1	Jim Hall	Concierto
CTI 6061S1	Don Sebesky	The Rape of El Morro
CTI 6062	George Benson	Good King Bad
CTI 6063	Bob James	Three
CTI 6064	Ron Carter	Yellow & Green
CTI 6065	Hubert Laws	Then There Was Light: In the Beginning Vol. 1
CTI 6066	Hubert Laws	Then There Was Light: In the Beginning Vol. 2
CTI 6067	Joe Farrell	Song of the Wind (Reissue of CTI 6003)
CTI 6068	Allan Holdsworth	Velvet Darkness
CTI 6069	George Benson and Joe Farrell	Benson & Farrell
CTI 6072S1	George Benson	In Concert-Carnegie Hall

=== CTI Twofer series ===
The albums in the CTI Twofer series were double albums released between 1972 and 1974.

Catalog number	Artist	Title
CTX 3+3	Hubert Laws	In the Beginning
CTX 2+2	CTI All-Stars (George Benson, Freddie Hubbard, Hubert Laws, Stanley Turrentine, Hank Crawford, Johnny Hammond, Ron Carter, Billy Cobham, Airto)	California Concert - The Hollywood Palladium

=== 5000 Series ===
The 5000 Series was introduced in 1975 as a series of popular music recordings and consist of eight issued albums. Only a handful in this series were produced by Creed Taylor; outside producers handled the rest, like Harvey Mason producing Seawind's albums and David Grusin and Larry Rosen producing Patti Austin's second album. The first releases features a "P.S." (which stood for "Pop Series") inside the familiar CTI logo.

Catalog number	Artist	Title
CTI 5000	Lalo Schifrin	Black Widow
CTI 5001	Patti Austin	End of a Rainbow
CTI 5002	Seawind	Seawind
CTI 5003	Lalo Schifrin	Towering Toccata
CTI 5004	John Blair	We Belong Together
CTI 5005	David Matthews	Dune
CTI 5006	Patti Austin	Havana Candy
CTI 5007	Seawind	Window of a Child

=== 7000 Series ===
The 7000 Series continued the numbering sequence from the 6000 Series after it ended its distribution deal with Motown.

Catalog number	Artist	Title
CTI 7070	Urbie Green	The Fox
CTI 7071	Hubert Laws	The San Francisco Concert
CTI 7073	Art Farmer	Crawl Space
CTI 7074	Bob James	BJ4
CTI 7075	Jeremy Steig	Firefly
CTI 7076	Various Artists	CTI Summer Jazz at the Hollywood Bowl - Live One
CTI 7077	Various Artists	CTI Summer Jazz at the Hollywood Bowl - Live Two
CTI 7078	Various Artists	CTI Summer Jazz at the Hollywood Bowl - Live Three
CTI 7079	Urbie Green with Grover Washington, Jr. and David Matthews' Big Band	Señor Blues
CTI 7080	Art Farmer with Yusef Lateef and David Matthews' Big Band	Something You Got
CTI 7081	Deodato	2001 (Reissue of CTI 6021)
CTI 7082	Yusef Lateef	Autophysiopsychic
CTI 7083	Art Farmer / Jim Hall	Big Blues
CTI 7084	Nina Simone	Baltimore
CTI 7085	George Benson	Space
CTI 7086	Patti Austin	Live at the Bottom Line
CTI 7087	Art Farmer with Joe Henderson	Yama (Only issued in Japan)
CTI 7088	Yusef Lateef	In a Temple Garden
CTI 7089	Art Farmer	Live in Tokyo

=== 8000 Series ===
The 8000 series was launched in the late-1970s. Its purpose was to reissue previous CTI and Kudu albums. In some instances original album titles were changed, and artwork was also altered, with releases originally issued in gatefold album covers now reduced to single sleeves.

Catalog number	Artist	Title
CTI 8000	Airto	Free (later reissued as Return to Forever) (Reissue of CTI 6020)
CTI 8001	Ron Carter	Blues Farm (Reissue of CTI 6027)
CTI 8002	Joe Beck	Beck & Sanborn (Reissue of KU-21 as Beck)
CTI 8003	Joe Farrell	Moon Germs (Reissue of CTI 6023)
CTI 8004	Milt Jackson	Sunflower (Reissue of CTI 6024)
CTI 8005	Joe Farrell	Outback (Reissue of CTI 6014)
CTI 8006	Stanley Turrentine	Sugar (Reissue of CTI 6005)
CTI 8007	George Benson	Beyond the Blue Horizon (Reissue of CTI 6009)
CTI 8008	Stanley Turrentine	Salt Song (Reissue of CTI 6010)
CTI 8009	George Benson	White Rabbit (Reissue of CTI 6015)
CTI 8010	Stanley Turrentine	Cherry (Reissue of CTI 6017)
CTI 8011	Stanley Turrentine	Don't Mess With Mister T. (Reissue of CTI 6030)
CTI 8012	Jim Hall	Concierto (Reissue of CTI 6060S1)
CTI 8013	Airto	Virgin Land (Reissue of SAL 701)
CTI 8014	George Benson	Take Five (Reissue of CTI 6045S1 as Bad Benson)
CTI 8015	Hubert Laws	The Chicago Theme (Reissue of CTI 6058S1)
CTI 8016	Freddie Hubbard	Red Clay (Reissue of CTI 6001)
CTI 8017	Freddie Hubbard	First Light (Reissue of CTI 6013)
CTI 8018	unissued	unissued
CTI 8019	Hubert Laws	Afro-Classic (Reissue of CTI 6006)
CTI 8020	Hubert Laws	The Rite of Spring (Reissue of CTI 6012)
CTI 8021	Deodato	Prelude (Reissue of CTI 6021)
CTI 8022	Freddie Hubbard	Straight Life (Reissue of CTI 6007)
CTI 8023	unissued	unissued
CTI 8024	unissued	unissued
CTI 8025	Deodato	Deodato 2 (Reissue of CTI 6029)
CTI 8026	unissued	unissued
CTI 8027	unissued	unissued
CTI 8028	Deodato/Airto	In Concert (Reissue of CTI 6041)
CTI 8029	Hubert Laws	Morning Star (Reissue of CTI 6022)
CTI 8030	George Benson	Cast Your Fate to the Wind (Reissue of CTI 6062 as Good King Bad)
CTI 8031	George Benson	Summertime (Reissue of CTI 6072S1 as In Concert-Carnegie Hall)

=== 9000 Series ===
The 9000 Series was started in 1980 and was distributed by CBS Records but maintained its independence (except for Patti Austin's Body Language album which carried a CBS-style look and catalog number) The series started with the classic orange label (used since the 6000 Series) but by 1981 switched to a white label with a new logo design, though in 1983, for George Benson's archive release Pacific Fire it had a silver label.

Catalog number	Artist	Title
CTI 9000	Art Farmer with Joe Henderson	Yama (The USA release of CTI 7087)
JZ 36503	Patti Austin	Body Language (Originally slated for CTI 9001)
CTI 9002	Ray Barretto	La Cuna
CTI 9003	Fuse One	Fuse One
CTI 9004	Nina Simone	Baltimore (Planned reissue of CTI 7084, but never released)
CTI 9006	Fuse One	Silk
CTI 9007	Chet Baker, Jim Hall, Hubert Laws	Studio Trieste
CTI 9008	Roland Hanna	Gershwin Carmichael Cats
CTI 9009	Patti Austin	In My Life
CTI 9010	George Benson	Pacific Fire

=== Kudu ===
The Kudu label was started by Creed Taylor in July 1971 and specialized in soul jazz, releasing 39 albums from 1971 to 1979. Kudu is considered CTI's sister label.

Catalog number	Artist	Title
KU-01	Johnny Hammond	Breakout
KU-02	Lonnie Smith	Mama Wailer
KU-03	Grover Washington, Jr.	Inner City Blues
KU-04	Johnny Hammond	Wild Horses Rock Steady
KU-05	Esther Phillips	From a Whisper to a Scream
KU-06	Hank Crawford	Help Me Make it Through the Night
KU-07	Grover Washington, Jr.	All the King's Horses
KU-08	Hank Crawford	We Got a Good Thing Going
KU-09	Esther Phillips	Alone Again, Naturally
KU-10	Johnny Hammond	The Prophet
KU-11	Eric Gale	Forecast
KU-12	Grover Washington, Jr.	Soul Box Vol. 1
KU-13	Grover Washington, Jr.	Soul Box Vol. 2
KU-14	Esther Phillips	Black-Eyed Blues
KU-15	Hank Crawford	Wildflower
KU-16	Johnny Hammond	Higher Ground
KU-17	Idris Muhammad	Power of Soul
KU-18	Esther Phillips	Performance
KU-19	Hank Crawford	Don't You Worry 'Bout a Thing
KU-20	Grover Washington, Jr.	Mister Magic
KU-21	Joe Beck	Beck
KU-22	Phil Upchurch and Tennyson Stephens	Upchurch/Tennyson
KU-23	Esther Philips with Joe Beck	What a Diff'rence a Day Makes
KU-24	Grover Washington, Jr.	Feels So Good
KU-25	Ron Carter	Anything Goes
KU-26	Hank Crawford	I Hear a Symphony
KU-27	Idris Muhammad	House of the Rising Sun
KU-28	Esther Philips with Joe Beck	For All We Know
KU-29	Grant Green	The Main Attraction
KU-30	David Matthews with Whirlwind	Shoogie Wanna Boogie
KU-31	Esther Philips	Capricorn Princess
KU-32S1	Grover Washington, Jr.	A Secret Place
KU-33S1	Hank Crawford	Hank Crawford's Back
KU-34S1	Idris Muhammad	Turn This Mutha Out
KU-35S1	Hank Crawford	Tico Rico
KU-3637M2	Grover Washington, Jr.	Live at The Bijou
KU-38	Idris Muhammad	Boogie to the Top
KU-39	Hank Crawford	Cajun Sunrise

=== Salvation ===
Salvation Records was a CTI subsidiary originally intended for gospel albums but after releasing one album by the B. C. & M. Choir and laying fallow for two years the label was revived for a handful of jazz and R&B releases. While Creed Taylor did produce the B. C. & M. Choir album, outside producers would handle the other releases.

Catalog number	Artist	Title
SAL 700	B. C. & M. Choir	Hello Sunshine
SAL 701	Airto	Virgin Land
SAL 702	Johnny Hammond	Gambler's Life
SAL 703	The New York Jazz Quartet	In Concert in Japan
SAL 704S1	Gábor Szabó	Macho

=== Three Brothers label ===
Three Brothers Records was a short-lived subsidiary of CTI named after Creed Taylor's sons (Creed Jr., John, and Blake). It had a few single releases and issued one album by Lou Christie.

Catalog number	Artist	Title
THB 2000	Lou Christie	Lou Christie

== See also ==
- Eric Gale
