= Phil Bodner =

American jazz clarinetist and studio musician (1917–2008)

- Birth name: Philip L. Bodner
- Born: June 13, 1917; Waterbury, Connecticut
- Died: February 24, 2008 (aged 90); New York, New York
- Genres: Jazz
- Occupation: Musician
- Instrument: Clarinet
- Labels: Dunhill

Philip L. Bodner (June 13, 1917 – February 24, 2008) was an American jazz clarinetist and studio musician who also played flute, oboe, saxophone, and English horn.

== Career ==
A native of Waterbury, Connecticut, Bodner worked as a studio musician in the 1940s and 1950s in New York City. In 1958, he recorded with Benny Goodman, Miles Davis, and Gil Evans. In the 1960s he played with Oliver Nelson and J.J. Johnson, and organized The Brass Ring, a group modeled after Herb Alpert and the Tijuana Brass. The Brass Ring released nine albums between 1966 and 1972. Associations in the 1970s included Oscar Peterson, Yusef Lateef, Peanuts Hucko, Wild Bill Davison, and Ralph Sutton.

Bodner played the signature piccolo part on the disco hit "The Hustle" by Van McCoy. Other work in the 1970s included playing with Ralph Sutton and Johnny Varro, working with Mingus Epitaph, and arranging Louie Bellson's tribute to Duke Ellington's Black, Brown and Beige. He worked in a swing style with Marty Napoleon, Mel Lewis, and George Duvivier in the 1980s and played with Maxine Sullivan and Barbara Carroll. Jazzmania released his album Jammin' at Phil's Place in 1990. Bodner died on February 24, 2008, at age 90.

== Discography ==
=== As leader ===
- The Greatest Sax in the World (Billed as Mr. Phil B for contractual concerns) (Kapp Records, 1966)
- Fine and Dandy (Stash, 1981)
- Jammin' at Phil's Place (Jazzmania, 1994)
- The Genius of Phil Bodner (Alanna, 2003)
- Clarinet Virtuosity: Once More with Feeling! (Arbors, 2006)

With Brass Ring

- Love Theme from the Flight of the Phoenix (Dunhill, 1966)
- Lara's Theme (Dunhill, 1966)
- Sunday Night at the Movies (Dunhill, 1967)
- The Disadvantages of You (Dunhill, 1967)
- The Now Sound of the Brass Ring (Dunhill, 1967)
- Gazpacho (Dunhill, 1968)
- Only Love (Dunhill, 1968)
- The Evolution of the Brass Ring (Itco, 1969)
- The Brass Ring Featuring Phil Bodner (Project 3, 1972)

=== As sideman ===
- Coleman Hawkins, The Hawk in Hi Fi (RCA Victor, 1956)
- Cootie Williams, Cootie Williams in Hi-Fi (RCA Victor, 1958)
- Miles Davis, Porgy and Bess (Miles Davis album) (Columbia, 1959)
- Joe Wilder, The Pretty Sound (Columbia, 1959)
- Paul Desmond, Desmond Blue (RCA Victor, 1962)
- Wes Montgomery, Fusion! Wes Montgomery with Strings (Riverside, 1963)
- Cal Tjader, Several Shades of Jade (Verve, 1963)
- Mel Davis, Dick Hyman, Bobby Rosengarden, Living Jazz: Dear Heart and Other Favorites (RCA Camden, 1965)
- George Benson, White Rabbit (CTI, 1972)
- Freddie Hubbard, Sky Dive (CTI, 1973)
- Joey DeFrancesco, Where Were You? (Columbia, 1990)
