= Shape of Things to Come (George Benson album) =

Studio album by George Benson
- Released: March 1969
- Recorded: August 27 – October 22, 1968
- Studio: Van Gelder Studio, Englewood Cliffs, New Jersey
- Genre: Soul jazz
- Length: 33:20
- Label: A&M
- Producer: Creed Taylor

George Benson chronology
| Giblet Gravy (1968) | Shape of Things to Come (1969) | Goodies (1968) |

Singles from Shape of Things to Come
- 1. "Don't Let Me Lose This Dream" Released: 1968

Professional ratings
Review scores
| Source | Rating |
|---|---|
| Allmusic | 5/5 stars |
| The Rolling Stone Jazz Record Guide | 2/5 stars |
| The Penguin Guide to Jazz Recordings | 3.5/4 stars |

Shape of Things to Come is the fifth studio album by the American guitarist George Benson, recorded in 1968 and arranged by Don Sebesky. It was his first album for A&M Records and his first album to be produced by Creed Taylor, who would remain his producer until 1976.

== Background ==
After four years and three different labels, Benson signed with the A&M/CTI label in 1968. He was to be the replacement for their star Wes Montgomery, who had died earlier in the year. For his first album with the label, producer Taylor brought in all of the labels heavyweights, arranger Sebesky, engineer Rudy Van Gelder, and guest artists Herbie Hancock and Ron Carter. The album is mostly cover songs from artists as diverse as Aretha Franklin, The Monkees and Glenn Miller. It also contains a pair of original compositions and some reworkings of movie soundtracks.

== Track listing ==
1. "Footin' It" (George Benson, Don Sebesky) – 4:23
2. "Face It Boy, It's Over" (Andy Badale, Frank Stanton) – 4:05
3. "Shape of Things to Come" (Barry Mann, Cynthia Weil) – 5:15
4. "Chattanooga Choo Choo" (Mack Gordon, Harry Warren) – 3:34
5. "Don't Let Me Lose This Dream" (Aretha Franklin, Ted White) – 4:42
6. "Shape of Things That Are and Were" (Benson) – 5:48
7. "Last Train to Clarksville" (Tommy Boyce, Bobby Hart) – 5:32

== Personnel ==
- George Benson – guitar, vocals
- Ron Carter – bass guitar (tracks 2, 6–7)
- Richard Davis – bass guitar
- Herbie Hancock – piano
- Hank Jones – piano
- Idris Muhammad (as Leo Morris) – drums
- Dave Mankovitz – viola (tracks 1, 3–4)
- George Marge – flute, cello (tracks 1, 3–4)
- Romeo Penque – flute, cello (tracks 1, 3–4)
- Alan Raph – trombone, sound effects, valve trombone, tuba (all tracks except 3)
- George Ricci – cello (tracks 1, 3–4)
- Stanley Webb – flute
- Joe Shepley – trumpet, flugelhorn (all tracks except 3)
- Wayne Andre – trombone, baritone saxophone (all tracks except 3)
- Burt Collins – trumpet
- Charles Covington – organ
- Don Sebesky – arranger, conductor
- Bernard Eichen – violin (tracks 1, 3–4)
- Jack Jennings – percussion, vibraphone (tracks 1, 3–4)
- Charles Libove – violin (tracks 1, 3–4)
- Buddy Lucas – harmonica, tenor saxophone, amplified harmonica (all tracks except 3)
- Johnny Pacheco – percussion, conga
- Marvin Stamm – trumpet, flugelhorn, piccolo (all tracks except 3)

=== Technical ===
- Creed Taylor – producer
- Rudy Van Gelder – engineer
- Sam Antupit – artwork
- Pete Turner – photography
