= Sky Dive =

Studio album by Freddie Hubbard
- Released: Early January 1973
- Recorded: October 4–5, 1972
- Studios: Van Gelder Studio, Englewood Cliffs, NJ
- Genres: Post-bop, jazz-funk, jazz fusion
- Length: 34:43 original LP
- Labels: CTI; CTI 6018
- Producer: Creed Taylor

Freddie Hubbard chronology
First Light (1971)	Sky Dive (1973)	Freddie Hubbard/Stanley Turrentine in Concert Volume One (1973)

Professional ratings
Review scores
Source	Rating
AllMusic	4/5 stars
DownBeat	4/5 stars
The Rolling Stone Jazz Record Guide	1/5 stars

Sky Dive is the twentieth album by jazz trumpeter Freddie Hubbard, recorded in 1972. It was his fourth album released on Creed Taylor's CTI label and features performances by Hubbard, Keith Jarrett, George Benson, Ron Carter, Billy Cobham, Airto Moreira and Ray Barretto.

== Track listing ==
1. "Povo" (Hubbard) – 14:46
2. "In a Mist" (Bix Biederbecke) – 7:05
3. "Naturally" (Nat Adderley) – 5:56 Bonus track on CD
4. "The Godfather (Theme)" (Nino Rota) – 7:23
5. "Sky Dive" (Hubbard) – 7:37
6. "Naturally" [Alternate Take] – 5:03 Bonus track on CD

== Personnel ==
- Freddie Hubbard – trumpet
- Alan Rubin, Marvin Stamm – trumpet, flugelhorn
- Wayne Andre, Garnett Brown – trombone
- Paul Faulise – bass trombone
- Tony Price – tuba
- Hubert Laws – flute, alto flute, bass flute
- Phil Bodner – flute, alto flute, bass clarinet, piccolo
- George Marge – alto clarinet, bass clarinet
- Wally Kane – bass clarinet, piccolo
- Romeo Penque – flute, alto flute, clarinet, oboe, English horn
- Keith Jarrett – piano, electric piano
- George Benson – guitar
- Ron Carter – bass
- Billy Cobham – drums
- Ray Barretto, Airto Moreira – percussion
- Don Sebesky – arranger, conductor

== Charts ==
Chart performance for Sky Dive
Chart (1973)	Peak position
US Billboard 200	165
US Top R&B/Hip-Hop Albums (Billboard)	21
