= First Light (Freddie Hubbard album) =

Studio album by Freddie Hubbard
- Released: October 12, 1971
- Recorded: September 14–16, 1971
- Studios: Van Gelder Studio, Englewood Cliffs, New Jersey
- Genres: Jazz-funk, post-bop, jazz fusion, soul jazz
- Length: 42:55
- Label: CTI
- Producer: Creed Taylor

Freddie Hubbard chronology
Sing Me a Song of Songmy (1971)	First Light (1971)	Sky Dive (1972)

Professional ratings
Review scores
Source	Rating
AllMusic	4.5/5 stars
The Penguin Guide to Jazz Recordings	3/4 stars
The Rolling Stone Jazz Record Guide	1/5 stars

First Light is an album by jazz trumpeter Freddie Hubbard. Recorded in 1971, it features string arrangements by Don Sebesky. It was his third album released on Creed Taylor's CTI label and features performances by Hubbard, Herbie Hancock, Eric Gale, George Benson, Ron Carter, Jack DeJohnette, Airto Moreira and Richard Wyands. The album is part of a loose trilogy including his two previous records at the time, Red Clay and Straight Life. First Light won a 1972 Grammy Award for "Best Jazz Performance by a Group".

== Track listing ==
1. "First Light" - 11:05 (Hubbard)
2. "Uncle Albert/Admiral Halsey" (P. McCartney, L. McCartney) - 8:17
3. "Moment to Moment" (Mancini, Mercer) - 5:43
4. "Yesterday's Dreams" (Norman L. Martin, Sebesky) - 3:55
5. "Lonely Town" [from On the Town] (Bernstein, Comden, Green) - 7:00
6. "Fantasy in D" (Walton) - 6:55
7. "First Light - live Detroit 4th March 1973" - 16:04 (Hubbard) Bonus track on CD

== Personnel ==
- Freddie Hubbard – trumpet, flugelhorn
- Richard Wyands – piano
- George Benson – guitar
- Ron Carter – bass
- Jack DeJohnette – drums
- Airto Moreira – percussion
- Phil Kraus – vibraphone
- Hubert Laws – flute
- Wally Kane – flute, bassoon
- George Marge – flute, clarinet
- Romeo Penque – flute, English horn, oboe, clarinet
- Jane Taylor – bassoon
- Ray Alonge – French horn
- James Buffington – French horn
- Margaret Ross – harp
- David Nadien – violin
- Paul Gershman – violin
- Emanuel Green – violin
- Harold Kohon – violin
- Joe Malin – violin
- Gene Orloff – violin
- Matthew Raimondi – violin
- Tosha Samaroff – violin
- Irving Spice – violin
- Alfred Brown – viola
- Emanuel Vardi – viola
- Charles McCracken – cello
- George Ricci – cello
- Don Sebesky – arranger, conductor

== Charts ==
Chart performance for First Light
Chart (1972)	Peak position
US Top R&B/Hip-Hop Albums (Billboard)	25
