= Straight Life (Freddie Hubbard album) =

Studio album by Freddie Hubbard
- Released: January 1971
- Recorded: November 16, 1970
- Studios: Van Gelder Studio, Englewood Cliffs, NJ
- Genres: Post-bop, soul jazz, jazz fusion, jazz-funk
- Length: 36:24
- Labels: CTI; CTI 6007
- Producer: Creed Taylor

Freddie Hubbard chronology
Red Clay (1970)	Straight Life (1971)	Sing Me a Song of Songmy (1971)

Professional ratings
Review scores
Source	Rating
Allmusic	5/5 stars
The Rolling Stone Jazz Record Guide	1/5 stars
Penguin Guide to Jazz	3/4 stars

Straight Life is a soul/funk influenced jazz album recorded in 1970 by trumpeter Freddie Hubbard. It was recorded on 16 November 1970 and released between the albums Red Clay (1970) and Sing Me a Song of Songmy (1971). This is also Hubbard's eighteenth overall album.

== Track listing ==
1. "Straight Life" (Freddie Hubbard) - 17:30
2. "Mr. Clean" (Weldon Irvine) - 13:37
3. "Here's That Rainy Day" (Jimmy Van Heusen, Johnny Burke) - 5:17

== Personnel ==
- Freddie Hubbard - trumpet, flugelhorn
- Joe Henderson - tenor saxophone
- Herbie Hancock - electric piano
- George Benson - guitar
- Ron Carter - double bass
- Jack DeJohnette - drums
- Richard "Pablo" Landrum - percussion
- Weldon Irvine - tambourine

== Charts ==
Chart performance for Straight Life
Chart (1971)	Peak position
US Top R&B/Hip-Hop Albums (Billboard)	34
