= Herb Bushler =

American jazz bassist

Herb Bushler (born March 7, 1939, New York City) is an American jazz bassist. He plays on both double bass and electric bass.

Bushler played piano and tuba in his youth before picking up double bass; he is classically trained in bass and has performed with symphony orchestras in this capacity. In 1966 he began a longtime association with ballet and film composer Coleridge-Taylor Perkinson. He worked extensively in jazz idioms in the 1960s and 1970s, including with David Amram, Ted Curson, Blossom Dearie, Tony Williams, and Paul Winter. He first played with Gil Evans in 1967, an association that would continue on and off until 1981. Other work in the 1970s included sessions with Enrico Rava, Joe Farrell, Ryo Kawasaki, David Sanborn, and Harold Vick. He played with The Fifth Dimension in the 1960s and has also worked with Dee Dee Bridgewater, Billy Harper, Les McCann, Enrico Rava, Joe Chambers, and Howard Johnson.

== Collaborations ==
With Gil Evans

- Svengali (ATLANTIC, 1973)
- The Gil Evans Orchestra Plays the Music of Jimi Hendrix (RCA, 1974)
- There Comes a Time (RCA, 1975)
- Live at the Royal Festival Hall London 1978 (RCA, 1979)

With Joe Farrell

- Penny Arcade (CTI, 1973)
- Upon This Rock (CTI, 1974)
- Canned Funk (CTI, 1975)

With others

- Peter Allen, Peter Allen (Metromedia, 1971)
- Teresa Brewer, It Don't Mean A Thing If It Ain't Got That Swing (Flying Dutchman, 1973)
- Dee Dee Bridgewater, Dee Dee Bridgewater (Atlantic, 1976)
- Michael Franks, Tiger in the Rain (Warner Bros., 1979)
- Ryo Kawasaki, Juice (RCA, 1976)
- Gary McMahan, Colorado Blue (Horse Apple, 1980)
- David Sanborn, Taking Off (Warner Bros., 1975)
- Josh White Jr., Josh White Jr. (Vanguard, 1978)
