= Creed Taylor =

American record producer (1929–2022)

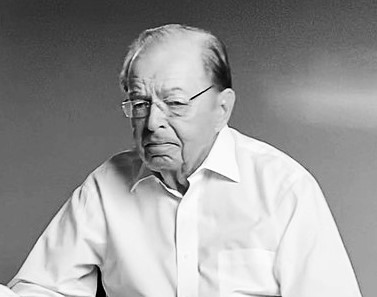
- Taylor in 2021
- Born: Creed Bane Taylor V May 13, 1929; Lynchburg, Virginia, U.S.
- Died: August 22, 2022 (aged 93); Nuremberg, Germany
- Occupations: Record producer, record label founder
- Musical career
- Genre: Jazz
- Instrument: Trumpet
- Years active: 1955–1995
- Labels: CTI Records; Bethlehem Records; ABC-Paramount; Impulse!; Verve; A&M Records

Creed Bane Taylor V (May 13, 1929 – August 22, 2022) was an American record producer, best known for his work with Creed Taylor, Inc. which he founded in 1966 and the CTI Records label. His career also included periods at Bethlehem Records, ABC-Paramount Records (including its jazz label, Impulse!), Verve, and A&M Records. In the 1960s, he signed bossa nova artists from Brazil to record in the US including Antonio Carlos Jobim, Eumir Deodato, João Gilberto, Astrud Gilberto, and Airto Moreira.

== Biography ==
=== Early work ===
Taylor was born in Lynchburg, Virginia, and spent his childhood in Pearisburg, Virginia, where he played trumpet in the high-school marching band and symphony orchestra. Although he grew up surrounded by country music and bluegrass, he gravitated more toward the sounds of jazz, citing Dizzy Gillespie as a source of inspiration during his high school years. Taylor recalls spending many evenings beside a small radio, listening to Symphony Sid's live broadcasts from Birdland in New York City.

After high school, Taylor completed an undergraduate degree in psychology from Duke University in 1951 while actively performing with the student jazz ensembles the Duke Ambassadors and the Five Dukes. Taylor credits Duke's strong tradition of student-led jazz ensembles, and Les Brown's association with Duke in particular, as initially drawing him to the university. As he recalls, "The reason I went to Duke was from hearing Les Brown and all the history of the bands who went through Duke. This was really a great jazz band, ... and the book was handed down from one class to the next, you had to audition and all the best players who came to Duke got in the band. ... I had a ball when I was there." After graduating from Duke, Taylor spent two years in the Marines before returning to Duke for a year of graduate study.

=== The Bethlehem years ===
Shortly thereafter, Taylor told his parents that he did not want to become a doctor, as they wished, or a psychologist, but wanted to work in jazz. He relocated to New York City in order to pursue his dream of becoming a record producer. Although he had no formal training in record production, he recalls that his "mix of naivete and positive thinking" convinced him that he could succeed. After arriving in NYC, Taylor approached a drummer friend, a Duke University alum, working in the record business there. His friend then introduced him to Gus Wildi who was running Bethlehem Records. Taylor persuaded Wildi to allow him to record the vocalist Chris Connor, who Bethlehem had been trying to unsuccessfully push in the pop music genre, with the trio of pianist Ellis Larkins in a jazz setting. Due in part to the album's success, Taylor became head of artists and repertoire for Bethlehem, where he remained during its two most significant years, recording such artists as Oscar Pettiford, Ruby Braff, Carmen McRae, Charles Mingus, Herbie Mann, Charlie Shavers, and the J.J. Johnson-Kai Winding Quintet.

=== The ABC-Paramount years ===
In 1956 Taylor left Bethlehem to join ABC-Paramount, where, four years later, he founded the subsidiary label Impulse!. Motivated by the idea of a label dedicated to tasteful, current jazz, Taylor worked with ABC-Paramount executive Harry Levine to advocate for the label, which he dubbed "The New Wave in Jazz". It was Taylor who signed John Coltrane to Impulse!, rather than Coltrane's better known producer at the label, Bob Thiele. Taylor's accomplishments during this period also included gaining immediate credibility for the label by releasing successful gate-fold albums by Ray Charles, Gil Evans, J.J. Johnson and Kai Winding, and Oliver Nelson. Taylor was sensitive to the importance of album cover design to visually attract people to the music, and he regularly hired photographers Pete Turner and Arnold Newman to create cover images. Taylor's successful Impulse! albums regularly blurred the genre-based lines between jazz and popular music, and his superb production values became the hallmark of the label.

=== The Verve years ===
Although he signed John Coltrane for Impulse! in 1960, Taylor left the following year to accept a job with Verve Records. There he prominently introduced bossa nova to the US through recordings such as “The Girl from Ipanema” with Antonio Carlos Jobim and Stan Getz. As Taylor recalls, "I went down to Brazil a few times and spent some time at Jobim's house and met all the players down there. Then of course after “Desafinado” became a hit, Jobim wanted to come up and see what New York was like, so he came in to see me right off the bat. That started a long friendship and series of albums."

As Gene Lees puts it: "Creed Taylor was treating [bossa nova] with respect and dignity. Were it not for Creed Taylor, I am convinced, bossa nova and Brazilian music generally would have retreated into itself, gone back to Brazil ... and become a quaint parochial phenomenon interesting to tourists, instead of the worldwide music and the tremendous influence on jazz itself that it in fact became."

In a 1965 article and interview with Taylor, historian, writer and editor of DownBeat - George Hoefer also noted that "At the time of this recording the bossa nova had run its course. Taylor held back the album, Getz/Gilberto, until the summer of 1964. It is likely that the album would have died if it had been released during the collapse of the bossa nova fad." Success of the track was also partly due to the two-minute forty-four-seconds airplay friendly studio edit rather than the full album track that was five-minutes fifteen-seconds. The studio edit was done by Creed Taylor and engineer Phil Ramone and had not been performed and recorded like that.

According to Lees, in Singers and the Song II, however, Getz asked Taylor to ensure that singer Astrud Gilberto was paid no royalties on “The Girl from Ipanema” single, which went on to sell more than five million copies. Gilberto was paid Musician Union scale rates for two days work as an otherwise unknown vocalist. The song has been covered more than 1,000 times according website SecondHandSongs.

While at Verve, Taylor also produced recordings by Wes Montgomery, Jimmy Smith, Bill Evans, Cal Tjader, and others.

=== CTI years ===
A certificate of incorporation for Creed Taylor, Inc. (CTI) was filed October 26th, 1966. The registration was in Taylor's then home, New York. The registration was as a domestic business corporation.

Popular opinion holds that CTI was variously "a subsidiary" or imprint of A&M Records and/or formed in 1967, when the first CTI production appeared on the crossover jazz/jazz fusion label CTI Records. CTI was a separate production company, owned by Taylor that produced records for A&M. Taylor signed a 5-year deal worth some $1,000,000.

=== Later years ===
In 2009, Taylor toured Europe with the CTI All Stars band. The first concert at the Montreux Jazz Festival was recorded and filmed for a CD/DVD/Blu-ray release, CTI All Stars At Montreux 2009, featuring Hubert Laws, Airto Moreira, Flora Purim, Randy Brecker, John McLaughlin, George Duke, Mark Egan, and special guest Jamie Cullum. The album was engineered by Rudy Van Gelder with cover art by Pete Turner. That same year, Taylor himself produced, for the first time, an extensive CTI reissue series on SHM-CD format, "The CTI + RVG" series, working for the last time with Van Gelder.

In 2010, Taylor once again put together the CTI All Stars for another tour, this time with Bryan Lynch replacing Randy Brecker. A video was filmed at the Burghausen Festival and was broadcast on German TV.

Creed Taylor, Inc. (CTI) was marked as inactive and dissolved as a legal entity by New York State in January 2012.

== Awards ==
Albums and tracks produced by Creed Taylor have won 12 Grammy awards. Eight tracks Taylor produced are Grammy Hall of Fame Inductees. However, Taylor himself has not been officially recognized by the Recording Academy. This is primarily because producers were not officially recognized by the Recording Academy until 1974. The last of Taylor's productions to win an award was in 1976, for George Benson "Theme From Good King Bad", which won the Grammy Award for Best R&B Instrumental Performance.

For his decades of production work numerous Grammy awards and nominations were made, these include awards for: Focus (Stan Getz, 1961), "Desafinado" (Stan Getz/Charlie Byrd, 1962), Conversations with Myself (Bill Evans, 1963), "The Girl from Ipanema" (Stan Getz/Joao Gilberto, 1964), "Willow Weep for Me" (Wes Montgomery, 1969), and "First Light" (Freddie Hubbard, 1972).

In 2005, Taylor was recognized with the DownBeat Lifetime Achievement Award. The October edition of the magazine included a four-page article on Taylor by Ted Panken and included a full-page photograph by Jack Vartoogian.

== Death ==
Taylor died on August 22, 2022, at the age of 93. Taylor had been visiting family in Winkelhaid, Germany, where he suffered a stroke on August 2. He was taken to hospital in nearby Nuremberg, where he died.
