= Smoker =

Smoker is a noun derived from smoke and may have the following specialized meanings:

- Someone who smokes tobacco, cannabis, cigarette or vape substitutes, or various other drugs
- Smoking (cooking), smoker, an apparatus for smoking (cooking technique)
- Bee smoker, a tool used in beekeeping
- Räuchermann, a German figurine used for burning incense
- A stag film

== People ==
- Smoker (surname)

== Fictional characters ==
- Smoker (One Piece), a character from the manga One Piece
- A smoker, or copper-burner, one of the types of allomancer in Brandon Sanderson's fantasy Mistborn series
- Smoker, a special infected in the 2008 game Left 4 Dead
- The antagonists in the 1995 film Waterworld

== Other uses ==
- Smokers (Footlights), performances by Cambridge University Footlights Dramatic Club, typically late-night shows presenting comedy sketches and songs at ADC Theatre
- Smoking concert, Victorian era, live performance, of mainly music, for men only
- Smoker (lecture), Victorian era, speech, for men only
- The Smokers (film), a 2000 film directed and written by Kat Slater
- The Smokers (painting), a 1630s painting by Adriaen Brouwer
- Black smoker, a type of hydrothermal vent
- White smoker, a type of hydrothermal vent
- Smoker parrot, colloquial name for the regent parrot
- "The Smoker," a short story by David Schickler
- Smoker or smoking car, a car on a passenger train, in which smoking is permitted, just as a sleeper or sleeping car is where passengers can sleep
- In baseball, another term for fastball.

== See also ==
- Chain smoker
- Smoking (disambiguation)
