= Smoking (disambiguation) =

Smoking is the inhaling of smoke generated for this purpose from various substances, most often tobacco.

It may take the form of:

- Pipe smoking
- Tobacco smoking
- Cannabis smoking

It may also refer to:

- Smoking (cooking), treating food by exposing it to smoke
- Smoking (rolling paper), a brand of rolling papers
- Smoking jacket, a waist-length men's jacket made of silk or velvet traditionally worn for smoking or leisure at home
- In parts of Europe and Brazil, "smoking" refers to a tuxedo (dinner jacket)

== See also ==
- Smokin' (disambiguation)
- Smoke, the airborne solid and liquid particulates and gases evolved when a material undergoes pyrolysis or combustion
- Smoker (disambiguation)
- Smoking concert
