= Smokin' =

Smokin' may refer to:

Albums

- Smokin' (Bobby Miller album)
- Smokin' (Charles Earland album)
- Smokin' (Curtis Fuller album)
- Smokin' (Eddie "Lockjaw" Davis album)
- Smokin' (Humble Pie album)
- Smokin (Jonny Lang album)
- Smokin' (Smokey Robinson album)
- Smokin', a 1982 album by Billy Cobham's Glass Menagerie

Songs

- "Smokin'" (song), 1976 song by Boston from their debut album
- "Smokin'", the lead track from Welsh band Super Furry Animals' 1998 Ice Hockey Hair EP
- "Smokin'", a song by Nas from Stillmatic
- "Smokin' (Empty, Try Another)", a song by Joni Mitchell from Dog Eat Dog
- "Smokin'", a song by Teddy Edwards from Heart & Soul
- "Smokin'", a song by MC Breed from Funkafied
- "Smokin'", a song by Mal Waldron from Sweet Love, Bitter (album)

== See also ==
- Smokin' in the Boys Room
- Smoking (disambiguation)
- Smoking Joe (disambiguation)
