= Jimmy Ponder =

American jazz guitarist

- Born: James Willis Ponder; May 10, 1946; Pittsburgh, Pennsylvania, U.S.
- Died: September 16, 2013 (aged 67) Pittsburgh
- Genres: Jazz, soul jazz
- Occupation: Musician
- Instrument: Guitar
- Years active: 1960s–2013
- Labels: Cadet, Impulse!, Milestone, Muse, HighNote

Jimmy Ponder (May 10, 1946 – September 16, 2013) was an American jazz guitarist.

== Career ==
When Ponder's brother entered the military, he left his guitar, and Ponder picked it up. In his early teens he received lessons from the guitarist in a band for which he sang doo-wop. He was drawn to the jazz guitar he heard on the radio. While playing in a rhythm and blues band, he occasionally inserted a jazz solo. He considered hearing guitarist Thornel Schwartz an important part of his life, when Schwartz was playing with organist Jimmy McGriff. He was impressed by Pat Martino when he saw Martino in the Jack McDuff band. He also cited as influences George Benson, Kenny Burrell, and Rene Thomas, though none surpassed the impact of seeing Wes Montgomery.

He learned the guitar solo from "Daily Double" (Quaker Town), the first 45 rpm single released by Charles Earland. When Earland performed in Pittsburgh, he invited Ponder to sit-in with the band and liked what he heard. Earland promised Ponder he could become a member of the band after he finished high school. Six months after graduating, he was hired by Earland.

He began playing with Earland at 17 and in the following years with Lou Donaldson, Houston Person, Donald Byrd, Stanley Turrentine, and Jimmy McGriff. He moved to Philadelphia and later New York City in the 1970s and recorded extensively as a leader. Since the late 1980s, he frequently returned to his hometown to perform with his trio of two other Pittsburgh musicians, Gene Ludwig and Roger Humphries. Ponder's highest charting release was Somebody's Child, which reached No. 3 on the JazzWeek airplay chart in 2007.

Ponder died of lung cancer in Pittsburgh at the age of 67 on September 2013.

== Discography ==
=== As leader ===
- While My Guitar Gently Weeps (Cadet, 1974)
- Illusions (ABC Impulse!, 1976)
- White Room (ABC Impulse!, 1977)
- All Things Beautiful (LRC, 1978)
- Ponder'n (51 West, 1981)
- Down Here on the Ground (Milestone, 1984)
- So Many Stars (Milestone, 1985)
- Mean Streets – No Bridges (Muse, 1987)
- Jump (Muse, 1989)
- Come On Down (Muse, 1991)
- To Reach a Dream (Muse, 1991)
- Soul Eyes (Muse, 1995)
- Something to Ponder (Muse, 1996)
- James Street (HighNote, 1997)
- Guitar Christmas (HighNote, 1998)
- Ain't Misbehavin' (HighNote, 2000)
- Thumbs Up (HighNote, 2001)
- Alone (HighNote, 2003)
- What's New (HighNote, 2005)
- Somebody's Child (HighNote, 2007)
- Live at The Other End (Explore, 2007)

=== As sideman ===
With Hank Crawford and Jimmy McGriff

- Soul Survivors (Milestone, 1986)
- Steppin' Up (Milestone, 1987)
- On the Blue Side (Milestone, 1990)

With Lou Donaldson

- 1967: Mr. Shing-A-Ling (Blue Note, 1968)
- 1968: Say It Loud! (Blue Note, 1969)

With Charles Earland

- Boss Organ (Choice, 1966)
- Soul Crib (Choice, 1969)
- Smokin' (Muse, 1977)
- Mama Roots (Muse, 1977)
- Infant Eyes (Muse, 1978)

With Richard Groove Holmes

- Blues All Day Long (Muse, 1988)
- Hot Tat (Muse, 1991)

With Etta Jones

- Ms. Jones to You (Muse, 1976)
- My Mother's Eyes (Muse, 1977)

With Jimmy McGriff

- The Main Squeeze (Groove Merchant, 1974)
- Stump Juice (Groove Merchant, 1975)
- Tailgunner (LRC, 1977)
- City Lights (JAM, 1981)
- Movin' Upside the Blues (JAM, 1982)
- Skywalk (Milestone, 1984)

With Houston Person

- Stolen Sweets (Muse, 1976)
- Wild Flower (Muse, 1977)

With others

- Rusty Bryant, Wild Fire (Prestige, 1972)
- Donald Byrd, Fancy Free (Blue Note, 1969)
- Andrew Hill, Grass Roots (Blue Note, 1968)
- Johnny Hodges, Rippin' & Runnin' (Verve, 1969)
- Willis Jackson, In the Alley (Muse, 1977)
- Clifford Jordan, Inward Fire (Muse, 1978)
- Jack McDuff, The Fourth Dimension (Cadet, 1974)
- John Patton That Certain Feeling, (Blue Note, 1968)
- Sonny Phillips, My Black Flower (Muse, 1976)
- Shirley Scott, Superstition (Cadet, 1973)
- Lonnie Smith, Mama Wailer (Kudu, 1971)
- Joe Thomas, Joy of Cookin' (Groove Merchant, 1972)
- Mickey Tucker, Triplicity (Xanadu, 1976)
- Stanley Turrentine, Common Touch (Blue Note, 1969)
- Joe Lee Wilson, Come and See (Explore, 2007)
