= Black Talk! =

Studio album by Charles Earland
- Released: 1970
- Recorded: December 15, 1969
- Studio: Van Gelder, Englewood Cliffs, New Jersey
- Genre: Jazz
- Length: 38:26
- Label: Prestige; PR 7758
- Producer: Bob Porter

Charles Earland chronology
Soul Crib (1969)	Black Talk! (1970)	Black Drops (1970)

Black Talk! is an album by organist Charles Earland, recorded in 1969 and released on the Prestige label.

== Reception ==
Professional ratings
Review scores
Source	Rating
AllMusic	5/5 stars
The Penguin Guide to Jazz Recordings	3.5/4 stars
The Rolling Stone Jazz Record Guide	3/5 stars

The initial Cashbox review stated that "jazz organist Charles Earland has come out of nowhere onto the charts. Assisted by Virgil Jones, trumpet; Houston Person, tenor sax; Melvin Sparks, guitar; Idris Muhammad, drums; and Buddy Caldwell, conga, Earland has made an album that has a wider appeal than any jazz organ set we can remember." The magazine noted the five selections and ended the review with "Watch this one closely for further action."

AllMusic awarded the album 5 stars with reviewer Scott Yanow calling it "one of the few successful examples of jazz musicians from the late '60s taking a few rock and pop songs and turning them into creative jazz" and stating that "fans of organ combos are advised to pick up this interesting set".

The title track is also featured in the 1972 film and its respective soundtrack Fritz the Cat.

== Chart performance ==
The album debuted on Billboard magazine's Top LP's chart in the issue dated July 11, 1970, peaking at No. 108 during a nineteen-week run on the chart. The album debuted on the Cashbox Top 100 Albums 101-140 chart in the issue dated July 18, 1970, and remained on the chart for six weeks, peaking at No. 115.

== Track listing ==
All compositions by Charles Earland except where noted.

1. "Black Talk" – 7:50
2. "The Mighty Burner" – 3:04
3. "Here Comes Charlie" – 8:15
4. "Aquarius" (James Rado, Gerome Ragni, Galt MacDermot) – 8:00
5. "More Today Than Yesterday" (Pat Upton) – 11:10

== Personnel ==
- Charles Earland – organ
- Virgil Jones – trumpet
- Houston Person – tenor saxophone
- Melvin Sparks – guitar
- Idris Muhammad – drums
- Buddy Caldwell – congas (on tracks 2 & 5)

== Sampled ==
Track 4, "Aquarius", was sampled by Nujabes on the 2005 track "Modal Soul" on the album of the same name.

== Charts ==
Chart (1970)	Peak position
US Billboard Top LPs	108
US Cashbox Top 100 Albums	115
