= Hanan Hameen =

- Born: July 18, 1979; New York City, U.S.
- Occupations: Artist director, arts administrator, artist, educator, dancer, curriculum developer in the arts and steam fields.

Hanan Hameen (born July 18, 1979) is an arts administrator, educator, and dancer from the United States. She is the founder and executive director of Artsucation Academy Network, and a co-founder of the Official Juneteenth Coalition of Greater New Haven, the New Haven African Arts Alliance, and Premiere Dance Company at the Neighborhood Music School. She is also the artistic director of the BAM DanceAfrica Candle Bearers, founded by Chuck Davis. She is a co-choreographer with the M'Bosse Dance Company in Kaolack, Senegal since 2020, and a cultural exchange program in Senegal.

== Early life and education ==
Hameen was born in New York City, and grew up in an artistic household in the South Bronx. Her father is Jesse Hameen II, and her mother Iman Hameen was a school teacher, dancer and filmmaker. Hameen attended Science Skills Center High School in Brooklyn, where she was a student of Patricia Dye. While in high school Hameen performed with the Brooklyn Academy of Music's Dance Africa, which brought a dance company from Africa or the African Diaspora to Brooklyn each year to teach dance and culture.

From 2003 to 2005, Hameen attended the State University of New York Empire State College, receiving a bachelor's degree in Dance and Administration. In 2009 to 2011, she attended Baruch College in New York City, and received a Masters of Educational Leadership.

From 2017 to 2022, Hameen attended Walden University and received a PhD in Education specialized in Educational Curriculum and Assessment. Her doctoral research focussed on culturally relevant instruction, STEAM fields education, and the motivation of gifted African-American youth.

== Career ==
Hameen is a certified principal. She has worked with the New York Board of Education to develop a curriculum focussed on arts education for young people. She leads several dance companies that teach hip-hop, African dance, drumming, and culture in New Haven, New York, New England, and Senegal.

She founded the Artsucation Academy Network in 2012. Hameen is a curriculum developer for the New Haven Neighborhood Music School since 2012. In 2012, she founded "Africa is Me!' a dance and drumming class at the Stetson Library in New Haven, Connecticut.

Hameen is a 2018 and 2023 Mandela Washington Reciprocal Exchange Alumni.

She is a member of the Dance Africa Elder's council, founded by Chuck Davis in 1977.

== Personal life ==
In 2010, Hameen was diagnosed with Lupus. She wrote a book, Rebirth of a Dancer: Lupus Tried to Kill Me But Dancing Saved My Life, about her experiences with Lupus. She became a lupus support group facilitator, and works with the Lupus Foundation.

== Awards ==
- 2018 – Arts Council of Greater New Haven 2018, Phenomenal Woman and Artist Commission
