= Smokey Joe =

Smokey Joe, Smokey Joe's or Smoky Joe's may refer to:

== Nickname ==
- Joe Barton, Texan Congressman, nicknamed "Smokey Joe" for defending industries against pollution controls
- Smokey Joe Baugh (1932–1999), American rockabilly musician
- Happy Finneran (1890–1942), American Major League Baseball pitcher
- Joe Martin (third baseman) (1911–1960), American Major League Baseball player
- Smokey Robinson (born 1940), American singer, songwriter, record producer and former record executive whose childhood nickname was "Smokey Joe"
- Joe Salem (American football) (born 1938), American former college football player and coach
- Charlie Teagarden (1913–1984), American jazz trumpeter
- Smokey Joe Williams (1886–1951), American baseball pitcher in the Negro leagues, member of the Baseball Hall of Fame
- Smoky Joe Wood (1889–1985), American baseball player

== Other uses ==
- Smokey Joe (video game), a variant of the 1978 arcade game Fire Truck
- Smokey Joe (model locomotive), a model steam locomotive built by Hornby Railways
- Smoky Joe's, a former men's clothing store and current website
- "Smokey Joe", nickname given to Soviet World War II freighter Sukhona by another ship's crew in Convoy QP 1

== See also ==
- Smoking Joe (disambiguation) or Smokin' Joe, a nickname
- "Smokey Joe's Cafe", a song by The Robins
- Smokey Joe's Cafe (revue)
  - Smokey Joe's Cafe: Direct from Broadway, a 2000 film
