= QleanAir Scandinavia =

Swedish multinational air filtration company

Coordinates: 59.35586257548518°N 17.973209526193536°E

QleanAir Scandinavia AB
- Trade name: QleanAir Scandinavia
- Type: Public
- Traded as: QAIR.ST
- ISIN: SE0013382066
- Industry: Cleanrooms, Smoking rooms, Air purifier
- Founded: October 26, 1987; 38 years ago
- Founder: Peter Bjersten
- Headquarters: Solna, Sweden
- Area served: Worldwide
- Key people: Sebastian Lindström (CEO); Bengt Engström (Chairman); Henrik Resmark (CFO)
- Products: clean rooms, air cleaners, smoking cabins
- Revenue: ▲504M kr (2023); 455M kr (2022)
- Operating income: ▲64M kr (2023); 29M kr (2022)
- Net income: ▲43M kr (2023); 13M kr (2022)
- Total assets: ▲662M kr (2023); 648M kr (2022)
- Total equity: ▲215M kr (2023); 184M kr (2022)
- Number of employees: 111 (2023)
- Website: qleanair.com; qleanair.us; qleanair.jp

QleanAir Scandinavia is a Swedish multinational air filtration company. The company sells air cleaning solutions for indoor environments. This includes air purifiers, smoking cabins, and modular cleanrooms. Business is conducted in EMEA, APAC, and North America.
