= Jesse Hameen II =

Jazz musician from Connecticut, United States

- Also known as: Cheese
- Born: New Haven, Connecticut, United States
- Genres: Jazz; R&B; soul
- Occupations: Musician, educator, mentor, humanitarian
- Instruments: Drums, tambourine

Jesse "Cheese" Hameen II was born in New Haven, Connecticut. He is a jazz drummer, percussionist, mentor, and educator. He plays the drums, and percussion instruments for over 40 years. He has held percussion clinics and workshops. He is also a jazz and rock studies instructor for the Neighborhood Music School for eighteen years. He has toured in the United States, Europe, Africa, and the Caribbean.

== Early life ==
Hameen was born in New Haven, Connecticut. He grew up in Dixwell, New Haven. Dixwell was a neighborhood that had a thriving jazz community when Hameen was growing up. He grew up with a love for music coming from a musical gospel family and a background in Afro-Cuban music, R&B, Jazz.

Hameen lived and performed on the West Coast early in his career. In 1966, at the age of 25, he moved back to the East Coast.

Hameen speaking about his life and career at a translate-a-thon at LaGuardia Community College in New York City.

== Career ==
He has performed and recorded with artists such as; Tommy Flanagan, Kenny Burrell, Lou Donaldson, Jimmy McGriff, Hank Crawford, Ruth Brown, Charles Earland, Curtis Mayfield, Irene Reid, Gloria Lynne, Bobby Watson, Stanley Turrentine, Jimmy Witherspoon, Grover Washington Jr, Lena Horne, Pharoah Sanders, Curtis Mayfield, Freddie Cole, George Benson, Christian Sands, Donald Smith, Arthur Prysock, George Benson, Etta Jones, George Adams, Talib Kibwe, Paul Brown, Benny Powell, David "Fathead" Newman, Leon Thomas, Little Jimmy Scott, Blue Mitchell, Curtis Fuller, Reuben Wilson, Brook Benton, Rich Goldstein, Rodney Jones (guitarist), Tony Williams, Seleno Clarke, Bonnie Raitt, Major Holley, Doug Carn, Kenny Barron, Bill Easley, Rodney Jones, Tina Fabrique, and others.

He is the president of Inspire Music Recording Company.

He is a founding member of the Jazz Haven, a not-for-profit organization founded in 1996. Jazz Haven promotes the culture of jazz, and the arts in New Haven, Connecticut.

Hameen was a mentor for Christian Sands, when Sands was 12 years old.

== Discography ==
- 1984 - Rodney Jones / Tommy Flanagan Quartet - My Funny Valentine (LP, Album) Timeless Records
- 1985 - "Cheesesteak" - Jimmy McGriff - State of the Art (LP, Album) Milestone Records
- 1994 - Silver Bells Various - Santa's Bag - An All-Star Jazz Christmas (CD, Comp) Telarc
- 1994 - Right Turn on Blues - Jimmy McGriff
- 1994 - Sun Meidia - Midnight Sun (CD, Album) Sumei Records
- 1998 - Gloria Lynne - This One's On Me (CD, Album) HighNote
- 2000 - Rodney Jones - My Funny Valentine (CD)
- 2002 - Christian Sands - Footprints (CD, Album)
- 2003 - Irene Reid - Movin' Out (CD) Savant
- 2004 - Irene Reid - Thanks to You (CD, Album) Savant

Writing & Arrangement

- 1994 - Sun Meidia - Midnight Sun (CD, Album) Sumei Records
- 2004 - Irene Reid - Thanks to You (CD, Album) Savant

Production

- 1994 - Sun Meidia - Midnight Sun (CD, Album) Sumei Records
- 2008 - Sign Of The Times (CD, Album)
