= Mama Roots =

Studio album by Charlie Earland
- Released: 1979
- Recorded: 1969 and 1977
- Studio: Van Gelder Studio, Englewood Cliffs, NJ
- Genre: Jazz
- Length: 39:14
- Label: Muse; MR 5156
- Producer: Ozzie Cadena

Charlie Earland chronology
Smokin' (1977)	Mama Roots (1979)	Infant Eyes (1978)

Mama Roots is an album by organist Charlie Earland which was recorded in 1969 and 1977 and released on the Muse label. The album contains reissues tracks from Earland's 1969 albums Boss Organ and Soul Crib.

== Reception ==
Professional ratings
Review scores
Source	Rating
AllMusic	3/5 stars

The AllMusic review by Ron Wynn stated "Impressive reunion with George Coleman (ts). Also includes Jimmy Ponder on guitar".

== Track listing ==
All compositions by Charles Earland except where noted

1. "Undecided" (Charlie Shavers) – 7:44
2. "The Dozens" – 3:47
3. "Red, Green & Black Blues" – 4:54
4. "Mama Roots" – 6:32
5. "Old Folks" (Dedette Lee Hill, Willard Robison) – 5:26
6. "Bluesette" (Toots Thielemans) – 6:35

== Personnel ==
- Charles Earland – organ
- George Coleman (tracks 1, 2, 4 & 5), Dave Schnitter (track 1) – tenor saxophone
- Jimmy Ponder – guitar
- Walter Perkins (tracks 1, 2, 4 & 5), Bobby Durham (tracks 3 & 6) – drums
