= Live at the Lighthouse =

Live at the Lighthouse may refer to a number of albums recorded at the Lighthouse Café in Hermosa Beach, California:

- The Cannonball Adderley Quintet at the Lighthouse
- Live at the Lighthouse (Charles Earland album)
- Live at the Lighthouse (Grant Green album)
- Live at the Lighthouse (Elvin Jones album)
- Live at the Lighthouse (Modern Jazz Quartet album)
- Live at the Lighthouse (Lee Morgan album)
- Live at the Lighthouse (The Three Sounds album)
- If You're Not Part of the Solution, You're Part of the Problem, rereleased as At The Lighthouse
