= Bobby Durham (jazz musician) =

American jazz drummer (1937–2008)

Bobby Durham (February 3, 1937 – July 6, 2008) was an American jazz drummer.

Durham was born in Philadelphia and learned to play drums while a child. He played with The Orioles at age 16, and was in a military band between 1956 and 1959. After his discharge, he played with King James and Stan Hunter. In 1960, he moved to New York City, where he played with Lloyd Price, Wild Bill Davis, Lionel Hampton, Count Basie, Slide Hampton, Grant Green, Sweets Edison, Tommy Flanagan, Jimmy Rowles, and the Duke Ellington Orchestra, in which he played for five months. While working with Basie, he met Al Grey, and was a member of several of Grey's small ensembles. He accompanied Ella Fitzgerald for more than a decade, and worked with Oscar Peterson in a trio setting.

Durham also played in trios with organists such as Charles Earland and Shirley Scott, and there was a resurgence in interest in Durham's work during the acid jazz upswing in the 1990s. Many of Durham's projects, both as sideman and as leader, came about because of his association with producer Norman Granz, who used him in performances with Ella Fitzgerald, Count Basie, Harry Edison, Tommy Flanagan, and Joe Pass. Durham led his own combos as well; he is noted for scat singing along with his drum solos. Durham has also performed often with pop and soul musicians such as Frank Sinatra, James Brown, Ray Charles, and Marvin Gaye.

He died of lung cancer in Genoa, Italy, aged 71.

== Discography ==
=== As leader ===
- Bobby Durham Trio/Gerald Price 1979
- For Lovers Only, 2001
- We Three Plus Friends, featuring Massimo Faraò and Paolo Benedettini, 2001
- Domani's Blues, 2004
- Christmas Jazz, 2006

=== As sideman ===
With Monty Alexander

- We've Only Just Begun (BASF)

With Wild Bill Davis and Johnny Hodges

- Wild Bill Davis & Johnny Hodges in Atlantic City (RCA Victor, 1966)

With Charles Earland

- Boss Organ (Choice, 1966 [1969])
- Smokin' (Muse, 1969/77 [1977])
- Mama Roots (Muse, 1969/77 [1977])

With Tommy Flanagan

- The Tommy Flanagan Tokyo Recital (Pablo, 1975)
- Straight Ahead (Pablo, 1976) with Eddie "Lockjaw" Davis
- Montreux '77 (Pablo, 1977)

With Al Grey

- Grey's Mood (Black and Blue, 1973–75 [1979])
- Struttin' and Shoutin' (Columbia, 1976 [1983])
- The New Al Grey Quintet (Chiaroscuro, 1988)

With Red Holloway

- The Burner (Prestige, 1963)

With Milt Jackson

- Loose Walk (Palcoscenico)

With Clifford Jordan

- Soul Fountain (Vortex, 1966 [1970])

With Jay McShann

- Some Blues (Chiaroscuro, 1993)

With Shirley Scott

- Mystical Lady (Cadet, 1971)
- Queen Talk: Live at the Left Bank (Cellar Live, 2023)

With Oscar Peterson

- The Way I Really Play (Pausa, 1968)
- The Great Oscar Peterson on Prestige (Prestige, 1968)
- Live at the Blue Note (Telarc, 1990)
- Saturday Night At The Blue Note (Telarc, 1991)
- Last Call at the Blue Note (Telarc 1992)
- Encore at the Blue Note (Telarc, 1993)

With Joe Pass

- Portraits of Duke Ellington (Pablo, 1974)

With Al Grey

- The New Al Grey Quintet (Chiaroscuro, 1988)
- Live at the Floating Jazz Festival (Chiaroscuro, 1990)

With Jesse Green

- Lift Off (Chiaroscuro, 1990)

With Shawnn Monteiro and Massimo Faraò Trio

- Never Let Me Go (Azzurra Music, March 2001)

With Waymon Reed

- 46th and 8th (Artists House, 1977 [1979])

With Pete Minger, Keter Betts and Dolph Castellano

- Straight From The Source (Spinnster Records, 1984)
