= Countdown (Jimmy McGriff album) =

Studio album by Jimmy McGriff
- Released: 1983
- Recorded: April 27 and 28, 1983
- Studio: Van Gelder Studio, Englwood Cliffs, NJ
- Genre: Jazz
- Length: 33:21
- Label: Milestone; M-9116
- Producer: Bob Porter

Jimmy McGriff chronology
The Groover (1982)	Countdown (1983)	Skywalk (1984)

Countdown is an album by organist Jimmy McGriff recorded in 1983 and released on the Milestone label.

== Reception ==
Professional ratings
Review scores
Source	Rating
Allmusic	4/5 stars
The Penguin Guide to Jazz Recordings	2.5/4 stars

Allmusic's Scott Yanow said: "Few surprises occur, but the music is quite enjoyable and easily recommended to fans of this genre".

== Track listing ==
1. "I'm Walkin'" (Fats Domino, Dave Bartholomew) – 6:59
2. "Holly" (Jimmy McGriff) – 5:15
3. "Down for the Count" (Frank Foster) – 4:07
4. "Blow Your Horn" (Benny Green) – 4:08
5. "Since I Fell for You" (Buddy Johnson) – 4:59
6. "Shiny Stockings" (Foster) – 8:14

== Personnel ==
- Jimmy McGriff – organ
- Clifford Adams Jr. – trombone
- Marshall Keys – alto saxophone
- Arnold Sterling – alto saxophone, tenor saxophone
- Melvin Sparks – guitar
- Vance James − drums
