= Something to Ponder =

Studio album by Jimmy Ponder
- Released: 1996
- Recorded: March 9, 1994
- Studio: M & I Recording Studio, NYC
- Genre: Jazz
- Length: 46:23
- Label: Muse; MCD 5567
- Producer: Houston Person

Jimmy Ponder chronology
To Reach a Dream (1992)	Something to Ponder (1996)	James Street (1997)

Something to Ponder is an album by guitarist Jimmy Ponder that was released by Muse in 1996.

Professional ratings
Review scores
Source	Rating
AllMusic	4/5 stars

== Track listing ==
All compositions by Jimmy Ponder except where noted

1. "Johnny's Place" – 4:14
2. "Since I Fell for You" (Buddy Johnson) – 12:11
3. "Satin Doll" (Duke Ellington, Billy Strayhorn, Johnny Mercer) – 6:06
4. "The Creator Has a Master Plan" (Pharoah Sanders) – 9:32
5. "Moonlight in Vermont" (Karl Suessdorf, John Blackburn) – 7:32
6. "Softly, as in a Morning Sunrise" (Sigmund Romberg, Oscar Hammerstein II) – 4:08
7. "Sunshine" – 2:40

== Personnel ==
- Jimmy Ponder – guitar
- Mark Soskin – piano
- Peter Washington – bass
- Roger Humphries – drums
