= Mean Streets – No Bridges =

Studio album by Jimmy Ponder
- Released: 1987
- Recorded: June 19, 1987
- Studio: Van Gelder Studio, Englewood Cliffs, New Jersey
- Genre: Jazz
- Length: 44:25
- Label: Muse; MR 5324
- Producer: Joe Fields

Jimmy Ponder chronology
So Many Stars (1985)	Mean Streets – No Bridges (1987)	Jump (1994)

Mean Streets – No Bridges is an album by guitarist Jimmy Ponder that was released by Muse in 1987.

== Reception ==
Professional ratings
Review scores
Source	Rating
AllMusic	3/5 stars

In his review on AllMusic, Ron Wynn called it "prototype Ponder; soul jazz and blues played with energy and a slick, yet resourceful conviction" stating "Ponder has never gotten the profile or the exposure he deserves; he doesn't use gimmicks or crank up the volume, but his tasty fills, clever riffs, and crisp, bluesy solos are always worthwhile".

== Track listing ==
All compositions by Jimmy Ponder except where noted

1. "Next Time You See Me" – 4:15
2. "(They Long to Be) Close to You" (Burt Bacharach, Hal David) – 4:46
3. "Time After Time" (Jule Styne, Sammy Cahn) – 5:04
4. "Mean Streets-No Bridges" – 6:50
5. "Solitude" (Duke Ellington, Eddie DeLange, Irving Mills) – 7:15
6. "I Only Have Eyes for You" (Harry Warren, Al Dubin) – 4:35
7. "After the Rain" (John Coltrane) – 5:06

== Personnel ==
- Jimmy Ponder – guitar, vocals
- Bill Saxton – tenor saxophone, flute
- Big John Patton – organ
- Geary Moore – rhythm guitar (tracks 2 & 4)
- Greg Bandy – drums
