= Leaving This Planet =

Studio album by Charles Earland
- Released: 1974
- Recorded: December 11, 12 & 13, 1973; Fantasy Studios, Berkeley, California
- Genre: Jazz-funk
- Length: 78:39
- Label: Prestige; PR 66002
- Producer: Charles Earland

Charles Earland chronology
The Dynamite Brothers (1973)	Leaving This Planet (1974)	Kharma (1974)

Leaving This Planet is a double album by organist Charles Earland that was recorded in 1973 and released on the Prestige label.

== Reception ==
Professional ratings
Review scores
Source	Rating
Allmusic	4/5 stars
The Rolling Stone Jazz Record Guide	3/5 stars
The Penguin Guide to Jazz Recordings	3/4 stars

Allmusic awarded the album 4 stars where Alex Henderson states "A definite departure from the type of earthy, groove-oriented soul-jazz he usually embraced, Leaving This Planet is perhaps Charles Earland's most ambitious album – not necessarily his best, but certainly his most surprising. Responding to the fusion revolution, Earland plays keyboards and various synthesizers in addition to his usual Hammond B-3 organ and thrives in a very electric setting... he leaves no doubt just how much he's enjoying this surprising change of pace."

== Track listing ==
All compositions by Charles Earland except as indicated

1. (A1) "Leaving This Planet" – 7:29
2. (A2) "Red Clay" (Freddie Hubbard) – 7:05
3. (A3) "Warp Factor 8" – 6:18
4. (B1) "Brown Eyes" – 11:45
5. (B2) "Asteroid" – 6:40
6. (C1) "Mason's Galaxy" – 7:17
7. (C2) "No Me Esqueca" (Joe Henderson) – 7:41
8. (C3) "Tyner" – 6:03
9. (D1) "Van Jay" – 8:36
10. (D2) "Never Ending Melody" – 9:45

== Personnel ==
- Charles Earland – organ, ARP and Moog synthesizers, clavinet (on track 3), soprano saxophone (on track 8), electric piano (on track 10)
- Eddie Henderson – trumpet (on tracks 1, 4, 6, 8)
- Freddie Hubbard – trumpet, flugelhorn
- Dave Hubbard – soprano saxophone, tenor saxophone, alto flute
- Joe Henderson – tenor saxophone
- Patrick Gleeson – ARP and Moog synthesizers
- Eddie Arkin (on tracks 1, 3, 4, 6, 8, 10); Greg Crockett (on track 2); Mark Elf – guitar
- Brian Brake (on tracks 3, 9, 10); Harvey Mason – drums
- Larry Killian – percussion
- Rudy Copeland – vocals (on track 1)
