= Pleasant Afternoon =

Studio album by Charlie Earland
- Released: 1981
- Recorded: 1980
- Studio: Van Gelder Studio, Englewood Cliffs, NJ
- Genre: Jazz
- Length: 35:13
- Label: Muse; MR 5201
- Producer: Houston Person

Charlie Earland chronology
Infant Eyes (1979)	Pleasant Afternoon (1981)	Coming to You Live (1981)

Pleasant Afternoon is an album by organist Charlie Earland which was recorded in 1980 and released on the Muse label in 1981.

== Reception ==
Professional ratings
Review scores
Source	Rating
AllMusic	3/5 stars

The AllMusic review simply stated "With Houston Person on tenor sax, Bill Hardman on trumpet, and Melvin Sparks on guitar. It was recorded at Englewood Cliffs, NJ.".

== Track listing ==
All compositions by Charles Earland

1. "Murilley" – 6:36
2. "A Prayer" – 3:46
3. "Organic Blues" – 7:31
4. "Pleasant Afternoon" – 11:04
5. "Three Blind Mice" – 6:16

== Personnel ==
- Charles Earland – organ
- Bill Hardman – trumpet
- Houston Person – tenor saxophone
- Melvin Sparks – guitar
- Grady Tate – drums
- Ralph Dorsey – percussion
