= The Leading Man (album) =

Studio album by Harold Mabern
- Released: 1993
- Recorded: November 9, 1992, January 21, February 11, March3 & 12, April 12, 1993
- Genre: Jazz
- Label: DIW
- Producer: James Williams

The Leading Man is an album by pianist Harold Mabern. It was released by DIW Records in 1993. Columbia Records released an album with the same title and some of the same tracks two years later.

== Recording and music ==
The core personnel are Harold Mabern (piano), Ron Carter (bass), and Jack DeJohnette (drums). They play on all of the tracks except "Mercury Retro", which is performed by Mabern alone. The album was produced by James Williams.

== Release and reception ==
Professional ratings
Review scores
Source	Rating
AllMusic	4.5/5 stars

The Leading Man was released in 1993 by DIW Records. An album of the same title was issued by Columbia Records in March 1995. Some of the tracks on this release are the same as for the original album, and the other tracks feature some different personnel.

The AllMusic reviewer commented that the album "is considered a classic, both for its selection of material and the performances of the various ensembles Mabern assembled for the date", and that Mabern's "playing, while always inspired, is revelatory in its sense of full orchestration and the shifting timbres of his solos". The American Visions reviewer wrote that: "Out of the crucible of Art Blakey's band, Mabern held his own for many years and carried some neophytes along the way. Here's a chance to hear him in his terribleness with some real giants."

== Track listing ==
=== DIW release ===
1. "Yes or No"
2. "Save the Best for Last"
3. "Full House"
4. "She/Mr. Lucky"
5. "Alone Together"
6. "The Man from Hyde Park"
7. "B&B"
8. "T-Bone Steak"
9. "Mercury Retro"

=== Columbia release ===
1. "Look on the Bright Side"
2. "Save the Best for Last"
3. "Full House"
4. "Alone Together"
5. "It's a Lonesome Old Town"
6. "Yes and No"
7. "Moment's Notice"
8. "Au Privave"
9. "B and B"
10. "Mercury Retro"

== Personnel ==
=== DIW release ===
- Harold Mabern – piano
- Ron Carter – bass (tracks 1–8)
- Jack DeJohnette – drums (tracks 1–8)
- Bill Mobley – trumpet, flugelhorn
- Bill Easley – alto sax
- Kevin Eubanks – guitar
- Pamela Baskin-Watson – vocals

=== Columbia release ===
- Harold Mabern – piano
- Ron Carter – bass (tracks 2–4, 6, 9)
- Christian McBride – bass (tracks 1, 5, 7, 8)
- Jack DeJohnette – drums (tracks 1–9)
- Bill Mobley – trumpet, flugelhorn (tracks 6, 9)
- Bill Easley – alto sax (track 2)
- Kevin Eubanks – guitar (track 3)
