= Smoking Joe =

Smoking Joe or Smokin' Joe is a nickname of:

- Joe Frazier (1944–2011), Olympic and world heavyweight boxing champion
- Jo Nattawut (born 1989), Thai Muay Thai kickboxer
- Smokin' Joe Kubek (1956–2015), blues musician
- Smokin' Joe Misiti (born 1974), Australian footballer
- Smokin Joe Robinson (born 1991), Australian guitarist
- Smokin' Joe Stanley (born 1957), New Zealand former rugby player

== See also ==
- Smokin' (disambiguation)
- Smokey Joe (disambiguation)
- Smokin' Joe's, an Indian chain of pizzerias
- Smokin Joes Trading Post, a Native American cigarette brand
