= State of the Art (Jimmy McGriff album) =

Studio album by Jimmy McGriff
- Released: 1986
- Recorded: May 13 and 14, 1985
- Studio: Quadrosonic Sound Studio, NYC
- Genre: Jazz
- Length: 37:26
- Label: Milestone; M-9135
- Producer: Bob Porter

Jimmy McGriff chronology
Skywalk (1984)	State of the Art (1986)	Soul Survivors (1986)

State of the Art is an album by organist Jimmy McGriff recorded in 1985 and released on the Milestone label.

Professional ratings
Review scores
Source	Rating
Allmusic	4/5 stars

== Track listing ==
All compositions by Jimmy McGriff except where noted

1. "Headbender" – 5:23
2. "Stormy Weather" (Harold Arlen, Ted Koehler) – 4:26
3. "Cheesesteak" – 5:57
4. "Don't Ever Doubt Me" (Jimmy McGriff, Thornell Schwartz) – 4:18
5. "New Wave Blues" – 6:15
6. "Slow Grindin'" – 4:39
7. "Hip Hop Bebop" (Lonnie Smith) – 6:28

== Personnel ==
- Jimmy McGriff – organ, keyboards, arranger
- Lonnie Smith – synthesizer
- Melvin Sparks – guitar, arranger
- Stanley Banks – electric bass (tracks 1, 4 & 6)
- Bernard Davis (tracks 1, 4 & 6), Jesse "Cheese" Hameen (track 3) − drums
