= Black Drops =

Studio album by Charles Earland
- Released: October/November 1970
- Recorded: June 1, 1970
- Studio: Van Gelder Studio, Englewood Cliffs, New Jersey
- Genre: Jazz
- Length: 38:39
- Label: Prestige; PR 7815
- Producer: Bob Porter

Charles Earland chronology
Black Talk! (1969)	Black Drops (1970)	Living Black! (1970)

Black Drops is an album by organist Charles Earland which was recorded in 1970 and released on the Prestige label.

== Reception ==
Professional ratings
Review scores
Source	Rating
Allmusic	3/5 stars
The Rolling Stone Jazz Record Guide	4/5 stars
The Penguin Guide to Jazz Recordings	2.5/4 stars

Alex Henderson of Allmusic wrote, "Although not in a class with Black Talk or Living Black, this Bob Porter-produced soul-jazz/hard bop LP is satisfying and generally enjoyable".

== Chart performance ==
The album debuted on Billboard magazine's Top LP's chart in the issue dated November 21, 1970, peaking at No. 131 during a ten-week run on the chart.

== Track listing ==
All compositions by Charles Earland except where noted.

No.	Title	Length
1.	"Sing a Simple Song" (Sly Stone)	5:44
2.	"Don't Say Goodbye"	7:09
3.	"Lazy Bird" (John Coltrane)	7:18
4.	"Letha"	7:23
5.	"Raindrops Keep Fallin' on My Head" (Burt Bacharach, Hal David)	3:48
6.	"Buck Green"	7:17

== Personnel ==
- Charles Earland – organ
- Virgil Jones – trumpet
- Clayton Pruden – trombone
- Jimmy Heath – tenor saxophone, soprano saxophone, flute
- Maynard Parker – guitar
- Jimmy Turner – drums

== Charts ==
Chart (1970)	Peak position
US Billboard Top LPs	131
