= Come On Down (Jimmy Ponder album) =

Studio album by Jimmy Ponder
- Released: 1991
- Recorded: September 27, 1990
- Studio: Van Gelder Studio, Englewood Cliffs, New Jersey
- Genre: Jazz
- Length: 44:25
- Label: Muse; MCD 5375
- Producer: Houston Person

Jimmy Ponder chronology
Jump (1989)	Come On Down (1991)	To Reach a Dream (1994)

Come On Down is an album by guitarist Jimmy Ponder that was released by Muse in 1991.

Professional ratings
Review scores
Source	Rating
AllMusic	4.5/5 stars

== Track listing ==
All compositions by Jimmy Ponder except where noted

1. "Uncle Steve" – 5:49
2. "Ebb Tide" (Robert Maxwell, Carl Sigman) – 3:22
3. "Secret Love" (Sammy Fain, Paul Francis Webster) – 5:33
4. "Barbara" (Horace Silver) – 6:32
5. "Come on Down" – 10:10
6. "A Subtle One" (Stanley Turrentine) – 5:59
7. "A Tribute to a Rose" – 2:16
8. "Fats" (Dennis Alston) – 4:58

== Personnel ==
- Jimmy Ponder – guitar
- Houston Person – tenor saxophone (tracks 1, 3, 5 & 6)
- Lonnie Smith – organ
- Winard Harper – drums
- Sammy Figueroa – congas, percussion
