= Smoky Joe's =

Men's clothing store

Smoky Joe's was a men's clothing store that was started on Maxwell Street in Chicago, Illinois by Joseph Bublick in the late 1930s. The store was known as a trend setter in men's fashions. The name originated as a combination between Joe and his oldest son Morris (Morry) Bublick, who enjoyed smoking a pipe. Morry was purportedly an originator of the "Zoot Suit". Many black entertainers went to Smoky Joe's to have their entertainment suits made, including the Jackson Five at the beginning of their careers who traveled there from their home in Gary, Indiana. Morry also suited James Brown and other well-known black entertainers during the 1950s and 1960s. In the 1970s, there were three Smoky Joe's stores in Chicago.

Smoky Joe's was mentioned in a Jimmie Lee Robinson's blues song "Maxwell Street (Tear Down Blues)". "I'm talking about Maxwell Street, that's right. A place of many lives, many dreams...I remember when we use to go to the 12th Street Store. There was the Earvin, Bertells, Levetts and Smoky Joe's ..." Jimmie Lee Robinson who was one of the first Chicago-born Bluesmen. He lived a few blocks from the Maxwell Street Market.

The last Smoky Joe's retail store closed in the mid-1970s. The brand was revived in fall 2011 as a bespoke made-in-Chicago smoking jacket company by the first grandson of Morry Bublick, Steve Omans and his fiancé' Beth Stern.
