= Kharma (album) =

Live album by Charles Earland
- Released: 1974
- Recorded: July 6, 1974; Montreux, Switzerland
- Genre: Jazz
- Label: Prestige; PR 10095
- Producer: Charles Earland and Orrin Keepnews

Charles Earland chronology
Leaving This Planet (1973)	Kharma (1974)	Odyssey (1976)

Kharma is a live album by organist Charles Earland which was recorded at the Montreux Jazz Festival in 1974 and released on the Prestige label.

== Reception ==
Professional ratings
Review scores
Source	Rating
Allmusic	3/5 stars
The Rolling Stone Jazz Record Guide	3/5 stars

Allmusic awarded the album 3 stars stating "Earland was getting into mixing up his customary organ with electric piano and synthesizer by the time of this 1974 concert, recorded at the Montreux Jazz Festival... this is a respectable and energetic set containing some real flights of inspiration, as when he seems to be barely keeping some demons in check during the more frenzied solos".

== Track listing ==
All compositions by Charles Earland

1. "Joe Brown" - 8:38
2. "Morgan" - 13:05
3. "Suite For Martin Luther King Part 1: Offering" - 8:40
4. "Suite For Martin Luther King Part 2: Mode For Martin" - 7:59
5. "Kharma" - 5:04

== Personnel ==
- Charles Earland - organ, electric piano, synthesizer
- Jon Faddis - trumpet
- Clifford Adams - trombone
- Dave Hubbard - soprano saxophone, tenor saxophone, flute
- Aurell Ray - guitar
- Ron Carter - electric bass
- George Johnson - drums
