= Jump (Jimmy Ponder album) =

Studio album by Jimmy Ponder
- Released: 1989
- Recorded: March 28, 1988
- Studio: Van Gelder Studio, Englewood Cliffs, New Jersey
- Genre: Jazz
- Length: 42:44
- Label: Muse; MR 5347
- Producer: Joe Fields

Jimmy Ponder chronology
Mean Streets – No Bridges (1987)	Jump (1989)	Come On Down (1991)

Jump is an album by guitarist Jimmy Ponder that was released by Muse in 1989.

== Reception ==
Professional ratings
Review scores
Source	Rating
AllMusic	4.5/5 stars

In his review on AllMusic, Ron Wynn stated "Ponder is a good guitarist in the Grant Green school, a fine soul/blues player.".

== Track listing ==
All compositions by Jimmy Ponder except where noted

1. "I'll Always Be There" – 5:00
2. "You Stepped Out of a Dream" (Nacio Herb Brown, Gus Kahn) – 5:35
3. "Blues for Betty" – 4:02
4. "When Love Comes My Way" – 5:33
5. "My Romance" (Richard Rodgers, Lorenz Hart) – 4:23
6. "Stormy Monday" (T-Bone Walker) – 5:43
7. "Jump" – 6:02
8. "In a Mellow Tone" (Duke Ellington) – 6:26

== Personnel ==
- Jimmy Ponder – guitar, vocals
- James Anderson – tenor saxophone
- Big John Patton – organ
- Geary Moore – rhythm guitar
- Eddie Gladden – drums
- Lawrance Killien - percussion
