= Bill Easley =

American jazz multi-instrumentalist (born 1946)

- Born: January 13, 1946 (age 80); Olean, New York, U.S.
- Genres: Jazz
- Instruments: Flute, saxophone, clarinet

Bill Easley (born January 13, 1946) is an American jazz musician who plays saxophone, flute, and clarinet.

== Early life and education ==
Easley was born and raised in Olean, New York. He began playing music at the age of 13 and studied at Memphis State University during the 1960s.

== Career ==
Easley worked with George Benson in the late 1960s and with Isaac Hayes in the 1970s. He also did sessions at Stax and Hi Records (with Ann Peebles and Al Green). He moved back to New York in 1980.

He has worked with Roland Hanna, Jimmy McGriff, Jimmy Smith, Ruth Brown, James Williams, Bill Mobley, George Caldwell, Mulgrew Miller, Grady Tate, Victor Gaskin, Panama Francis, Mercer Ellington, and Billy Higgins.

== Discography ==
- Wind Inventions (Sunnyside, 1986)
- First Call (Milestone, 1990)
- Easley Said (Evidence, 1997)
- Business Man's Bounce (18th & Vine, 2007)
- Hearing Voices (18th and Vine, 2008)
- Love Stories (American Showplace, 2010)

=== As sideman ===
With Mercer Ellington

- Duke Ellington's Sophisticated Ladies (RCA, 1981)
- Music is My Mistress (Music Masters, 1988)

With Jimmy McGriff

- City Lights (JAM, 1981)
- Movin' Upside the Blues (JAM, 1982)
- Skywalk (Milestone, 1984)
- Blue to the 'Bone (Milestone, 1988)
- You Ought to Think About Me (Headfirst, 1990)
- McGriff's House Party (Milestone, 2000)
- Feelin' It (Milestone, 2000)
- McGriff Avenue (Milestone, 2002)

With Warren Vaché

- Talk to Me Baby (Muse, 1996)

With James Williams

- Flying Colors (Zim, 1977)
- Alter Ego (Sunnyside, 1984)
- Progress Report (Sunnyside, 1985)
- Memphis Convention (DIW, 1992)

With others

- Jimmy Witherspoon, Sings the Blues (Black & Blue, 1980)
- Benny Carter, Central City Sketches (MusicMasters, 1987)
- Bobby Watson, The Year of the Rabbit (New Note, 1987)
- Charles Earland, Front Burner (Milestone, 1988)
- Ed Thigpen, BWay (Alpha Jazz, 1989)
- Grady Tate, Dream Love (All Art, 1989)
- Joey DeFrancesco, Where Were You? (Columbia, 1990)
- Etta Jones, Christmas with Etta Jones (Muse, 1990)
- Randy Johnston, Walk On (Muse, 1992)
- Grady Tate, TNT Grady Tate Sings (Milestone, 1991)
- Dakota Staton, Darling Please Save Your Love for Me (Muse, 1991)
- Jimmy Heath, Little Man Big Band, (Verve, 1992)
- Harold Mabern The Leading Man (DIW, 1993)
- Chris Connor, I Walk With Music (HighNote, 2002)
- Mark Murphy, Memories of You: Remembering Joe Williams (HighNote, 2003)
