= Bobby Miller (musician) =

American musician (born 1966)

- Also known as: Bobby
- Born: Robert C. Miller Jr.
- Origin: Chicago, Illinois United States
- Genres: Neo soul, rock
- Instruments: Drums, keyboards
- Years active: 1990–present
- Labels: Dafont, Intercept
- Website: bobbymiller3.tripod.com (archived)

Bobby Miller (born April 3, 1966) is a neo-soul/rock musician from Chicago, Illinois.

== Career ==
A multi-instrumentalist, Miller began playing piano at the age of 8 and later studied trumpet and drums at the Lyon and Healy's school of music. With roots stemming from the church, Miller's resume includes working with such well known musicians and songwriters as Marvin Yancy, Raynard Miner (Fontella Bass "Rescue Me"), Clarence Satchell and Marshall Jones of the Ohio Players and he was the drummer for former Roger Troutman and Zapp vocalist Wanda Rash.

An active member of both ASCAP and NARAS, Miller's debut solo album was recorded on the Chi-Town Ballin' label in 1992 and he produced several solo albums on the Dafont Records label out of Chicago. Most of Miller's productions include collaborations with engineer and guitarist Jerry Soto. With his flair for flashy musical productions, Miller is credited with scoring sound effects for the 2004 Steve T. Berry horror film The Embalmer.

== Discography ==
- Shatter Proof — Chi-Town Ballin' Records 1994 (Produced by Bobby Miller and Terry World)
- Players Never Die — Dafont Records 1997 (Produced by Bobby Miller, Feat. Marshall Jones and Ralph "Pee Wee" Middlebrooks)
- The Whole Theory — Orchard/Dafont Records 1999 (Produced by Bobby Miller and David Seape)
- Smokin' — Intercept Records 2001 (Produced by Bobby Miller)
- Meditation — Intercept Recordings 2003 (Produced by Bobby Miller)
