= To Reach a Dream =

Studio album by Jimmy Ponder
- Released: 1992
- Recorded: July 26, 1988 and June 5, 1989
- Studio: Van Gelder Studio, Englewood Cliffs, New Jersey and Fox Recording Studio, Rutherford, NJ
- Genre: Jazz
- Length: 51:51
- Label: Muse; CD 5394
- Producer: Don Sickler and Joe Fields

Jimmy Ponder chronology
Come On Down (1991)	To Reach a Dream (1992)	Something to Ponder (1996)

To Reach a Dream is an album by guitarist Jimmy Ponder that was released by Muse in 1991.

Professional ratings
Review scores
Source	Rating
AllMusic	3/5 stars

== Track listing ==
All compositions by Jimmy Ponder except where noted

1. "To Reach a Dream" – 6:27
2. "You Are Too Beautiful" (Richard Rodgers, Lorenz Hart) – 6:02
3. "Ruby" (Heinz Roemheld, Mitchell Parish) – 7:02
4. "Bumpin' On Sunset" – 9:27
5. "Oleo" (Sonny Rollins) – 2:59
6. "At Last" (Harry Warren, Mack Gordon) – 6:08
7. "This Bitter Earth" (Clyde Otis) – 9:04
8. "Don't Be Flat Blues" – 4:42
- Recorded at Van Gelder Studio, Englewood Cliffs, NJ on July 26, 1988 (tracks 2–4, 6 & 8) and at Fox Recording Studio, Rutherford, NJ on June 5, 1989 (tracks 1, 5 & 7)

== Personnel ==
- Jimmy Ponder – guitar, vocals
- Lonnie Smith – organ
- Geary Moore – rhythm guitar (tracks 2, 4 & 6)
- Greg Bandy – drums
- Lawrence Killian - percussion
