= Arnold Sterling =

Arnold Sterling (March 2, 1938 - November 28, 2015) was a Baltimore, Maryland-based player of the saxophone (soprano, alto and tenor), and a prominent part of the Baltimore jazz scene. He toured with Jackie Wilson in the late 1950s, then worked with organist Bill Byrd in Baltimore. In the 1980s, he toured and recorded with organist Jimmy McGriff, and later in the decade with other organists Percy Smith and Don Patterson. In 2002, he recorded with blues singer Nap Turner.

== Discography ==
=== As leader ===
- Here's Brother Sterling (JAM, 1982)

=== As sideman ===
With Jimmy McGriff

- Movin' Upside the Blues (JAM, 1982)
- The Groover (JAM, 1982)
- Countdown (Milestone, 1983)
- Skywalk (Milestone, 1984)

With [(Nap "Don't Forget the Blues" Turner)

Live At Cada Vez (Right on Rhythm/Folkways, 2002)
