= Living Black! =

Live album by Charles Earland
- Released: 1971
- Recorded: September 17, 1970; The Key Club, New Jersey
- Genre: Jazz
- Length: 55:11
- Label: Prestige; PR 10009
- Producer: Bob Porter

Charles Earland chronology
Black Drops (1970)	Living Black! (1971)	Soul Story (1971)

Living Black! is a live album by organist Charles Earland which was recorded in New Jersey 1970 and released on the Prestige label.

== Reception ==
Professional ratings
Review scores
Source	Rating
Allmusic	5/5 stars
The Rolling Stone Jazz Record Guide	3/5 stars

Allmusic awarded the album 5 stars stating "Living Black! is notable for many reasons, not the least of which is that it showcased Earland in a live setting at his most inspired. From choosing his sidemen to material to reading the audience to pure instrumental execution, there isn't a weak moment on this date, nor a sedentary one... Everybody who was there, no doubt -- as well as any listener with blood instead of sawdust in her or his veins -- had their minds blown long before".

== Chart performance ==
The album debuted on Billboard magazine's Top LP's chart in the issue dated May 15, 1971, peaking at No. 176 during a seven-week run on the chart.

== Track listing ==
All compositions by Charles Earland except as indicated

1. "Key Club Cookout" - 9:31
2. "Westbound No. 9" (Daphne Dumas, Ronald Dunbar, Edith Wayne) - 8:19
3. "Killer Joe" (Benny Golson) - 14:28
4. "Milestones" (Miles Davis) - 4:34
5. "More Today Than Yesterday" (Pat Upton) - 8:20 Bonus track on CD reissue
6. "Message from a Black Man" (Barrett Strong, Norman Whitfield) - 9:59 Bonus track on CD reissue

== Personnel ==
- Charles Earland - organ
- Gary Chandler - trumpet
- Grover Washington Jr. - tenor saxophone
- Maynard Parker - guitar
- Jesse Kilpatrick - drums
- Buddy Caldwell - congas

== Charts ==
Chart (1971)	Peak position
US Billboard Top LPs	176
