= Movin' Upside the Blues =

Studio album by Jimmy McGriff
- Released: April 1982
- Recorded: December 19, 1980 & June 23 and 24, 1981
- Studio: Van Gelder Studio, Englwood Cliffs, NJ
- Genre: Jazz
- Length: 34:50
- Label: Jazz America Marketing (JAM); JAM 005
- Producer: Bob Porter

Jimmy McGriff chronology
City Lights (1981)	Movin' Upside the Blues (1982)	The Groover (1982)

Movin' Upside the Blues is an album by organist Jimmy McGriff recorded in 1981 (with one track from late 1980) and released on the Jazz America Marketing (JAM) label.

== Reception ==
Professional ratings
Review scores
Source	Rating
Allmusic	4.5/5 stars

Allmusic's Scott Yanow said: "As usual, most of the music is blues-based, although the inclusion of "Moonlight Serenade" in this soul-jazz setting is a pleasant surprise".

== Track listing ==
1. "Moonlight Serenade" (Glenn Miller, Mitchell Parish) – 6:30
2. "All Day Long" (Kenny Burrell) – 11:02
3. "Could Be" (Jimmy McGriff, Jimmy Ponder) – 5:34
4. "Free and Foxy" (McGriff, Ponder) – 6:12
5. "Movin' Upside the Blues" (McGriff) – 5:24
- Recorded on December 19, 1980 (track 2), June 23, 1981 (tracks 4 & 5) and June 24, 1981 (tracks 1 & 3)

== Personnel ==
- Jimmy McGriff – organ
- Bill Hardman (tracks 4 & 5), Danny Moore (track 2) – trumpet
- Bill Easley (track 2), Arnold Sterling (tracks 1 & 3–5) – alto saxophone
- Harold Vick – tenor saxophone (track 2)
- Jimmy Ponder – guitar
- Vance James (tracks 1 & 3–5), Victor Jones (track 2) − drums
- Richard Byrd – congas (track 2)
