= Charles III (album) =

Studio album by Charles Earland
- Released: 1973
- Recorded: February 16–17, 1972 and February 14, 1973
- Studio: Van Gelder Studio, Englewood Cliffs, New Jersey
- Genre: Jazz
- Label: Prestige; PR 10061
- Producer: Charles Earland

Charles Earland chronology
Live at the Lighthouse (1972)	Charles III (1973)	The Dynamite Brothers (1973)

Charles III is an album by organist Charles Earland which was recorded in 1972 and 1973 and released on the Prestige label.

== Reception ==
Professional ratings
Review scores
Source	Rating
Allmusic	3/5 stars
The Rolling Stone Jazz Record Guide	3/5 stars

Allmusic awarded the album 3 stars.

== Track listing ==
All compositions by Charles Earland except where noted.

1. "Charles III" – 6:20
2. "Girl, You Need a Change Of Mind" (Leonard Caston, Jr., Anita Poree) – 5:00
3. "Auburn Delight" – 8:35
4. "Lowdown" (Peter Cetera, Danny Seraphine) – 8:20
5. "My Favorite Things" (Oscar Hammerstein II, Richard Rodgers) – 6:00
6. "Speedball" (Lee Morgan) – 5:19

== Personnel ==
- Charles Earland – organ, electric piano, soprano saxophone, percussion
- Jon Faddis, Virgil Jones, Lee Morgan, Victor Paz, Joe Shepley, Richard Williams – trumpet, flugelhorn
- Garnett Brown, Dick Griffin – trombone
- Jack Jeffers – trombone, tuba
- Billy Harper – tenor saxophone, alto flute
- Seldon Powell – baritone saxophone, alto flute
- John Fourie, Greg Millar, Maynard Parker – guitar
- Stuart Scharf – acoustic guitar
- Jack Turner – guitar, percussion
- Billy Cobham – drums
- Darryl Washington – drums, percussion
- Larry Killian – percussion
- Sonny Morgan – congas
- Joe Lee Wilson – vocals
