= Bill Mobley =

American jazz musician

- Born: April 7, 1953 (age 71); Memphis, Tennessee, U.S.
- Genres: Jazz
- Instruments: Trumpet, flugelhorn

Joseph William Mobley (born April 7, 1953) is an American jazz trumpet and flugelhorn player.

== Early life and education ==
Mobley was born in Memphis, Tennessee. Both of his parents were musicians. Mobley learned piano, his mother's instrument, from age five, and while his father sang and played trombone and trumpet, Mobley did not have formal trumpet lessons in his youth. He studied music education at North Texas State University in 1971 and 1972, then returned to Memphis, where he played with Herman Green and James Williams. He earned a bachelor's degree from Rhodes College in 1976.

== Career ==
After graduating from college, Mobley relocated from Memphis to Boston, where he took a position teaching at Berklee College of Music from 1982 to 1986. His credits in the 1980s included work with Bill Pierce, Donald Brown, the Artie Shaw Orchestra under the direction of Dick Johnson, and Geoff Keezer. In the 1990s he performed with Marvin "Smitty" Smith and Clifford Jordan, also playing with his own big band in New York City.

== Discography ==
=== As leader ===
- Triple Bill (Evidence, 1996)
- Mean What You Say (Space Time, 1999)
- Moodscape (Space Time, 2007)
- New Light (Space Time, 2008)
- Live at Smoke (Space Time, 2011)
- Black Elk's Dream (Space Time, 2013) - a live album with Orchestre d'Auvergne
- Hittin' Home (Space Time, 2016)

=== As sideman ===
With Donald Brown

- Early Bird (Sunnyside, 1988)
- Cartunes (Muse, 1995)
- Wurd On the Skreet (Space Time, 1998)
- At This Point in My Life (Space Time, 2001)
- Fast Forward to the Past (Space Time, 2008)

With others

- Alan Dawson, Waltzin' with Flo (Space Time, 1998)
- Bill Easley, First Call (Milestone, 1991)
- Bill Easley, Easley Said (Evidence, 1997)
- Geoff Keezer, Waiting in the Wings (Sunnyside, 1989)
- Geoff Keezer, Other Spheres (DIW, 1993)
- Harold Mabern, The Leading Man (Columbia, 1993)
- Calvin Newborn, Up City! (Yellow Dog, 2005)
- Sara K., Play On Words (Chesky, 1994)
- Jean Toussaint, Blue Black (Space Time, 2001)
- Roberta Piket, One for Marian: Celebrating Marian McPartland (Thirteen Note, 2016)
