= City Lights (Jimmy McGriff album) =

Studio album by Jimmy McGriff
- Released: 1981
- Recorded: December 19, 1980 & February 4, 1981
- Studio: Van Gelder Studio, Englwood Cliffs, NJ
- Genre: Jazz
- Length: 37:28
- Label: Jazz America Marketing (JAM); JAM 002
- Producer: Bob Porter

Jimmy McGriff chronology
| Outside Looking In (1978) | City Lights (1981) | Movin' Upside the Blues (1982) |

City Lights is an album by organist Jimmy McGriff recorded in late 1980 and early 1981 and released on the Jazz America Marketing (JAM) label.

== Reception ==
Professional ratings
Review scores
| Source | Rating |
|---|---|
| Allmusic | 4/5 stars |

Allmusic's Scott Yanow said: "he returned to prime form on this album. ... The repertoire is fairly typical for soul-jazz, including "Teach Me Tonight" and some funky blues, and the music is pleasing".

== Track listing ==
All compositions by Jimmy McGriff except where noted

1. "My Way" (Claude François, Jacques Revaux, Paul Anka) – 5:31
2. "Funky Accents" – 3:21
3. "Brickyard" – 9:51
4. "City Lights" – 4:11
5. "Teach Me Tonight" (Gene De Paul, Sammy Cahn) – 8:37
6. "Jimmy's Room" – 5:57

== Personnel ==
- Jimmy McGriff – organ
- Danny Moore – trumpet
- Leo Johnson / Bill Easley – alto saxophone
- Harold Vick – tenor saxophone
- Wayne Boyd / Jimmy Ponder – guitar
- Alfred Johnson – bass
- Victor Jones / Idris Muhammad − drums
