= The Whole Theory =

Studio album by Bobby Miller
- Released: 2000
- Recorded: CRC, Streeterville Studio, Universal Studios Chicago
- Genre: Neo soul, nu jazz, funk
- Label: Dafont Records
- Producer: Bobby Miller and David Seape

Bobby Miller chronology
Players Never Die (1997)	The Whole Theory (2000)	Smokin' (2001)

The Whole Theory is a 2000 album recorded by Bobby Miller. This was the third album for the singer. The songs were a departure from the organic, string-laden, guitar-wielding musical arrangements that Bobby has become known for on his previous and following album releases. The album did include a cover version of Heaven and Earth's "Guess Who's Back In Town". It was speculated that The Whole Theory was proposed to feature hip hop and film star Ice Cube. This has never been confirmed or denied.

== Track listing ==
1. Crazy (0:57)
2. Stay With Him (3:47)
3. Friday Night (3:48)
4. Keep It Coming (Featuring Quiche) (0:55)
5. I Gotta Get Paid (5:03)
6. Going Crazy (3:06)
7. Guess Who's Back In Town (4:00)
8. Serious Thang (3:14)
9. Bounce To This (3:51)
10. Can You Hang (2:58)
11. 3 Rounds Of Love (4:55)
12. Bounce To This (ol' skool mix) (4:19)
13. Friday (3:07)
14. Serious (3:12)

== Musicians ==
- Bobby Miller - vocals, drums, keyboards
- Jerry Soto- engineer, guitars, samples
- David Seape - additional keyboards
- Quiche - additional vocals
