= Infant Eyes =

Studio album by Charlie Earland
- Released: 1979
- Recorded: 1978
- Studio: Van Gelder, Englewood Cliffs, New Jersey
- Genre: Jazz
- Length: 40:25
- Label: Muse; MR 5181
- Producer: Ozzie Cadena

Charlie Earland chronology
| Mama Roots (1977) | Infant Eyes (1979) | Pleasant Afternoon (1980) |

Infant Eyes is an album by organist Charlie Earland which was recorded in 1978 and released on the Muse label the following year.

Professional ratings
Review scores
| Source | Rating |
|---|---|
| AllMusic | 3/5 stars |

== Track listing ==
All compositions by Charles Earland except where noted

1. "We Are Not Alone" – 5:03
2. "Blues for Rudy" – 12:00
3. "The Thang" – 7:10
4. "Infant Eyes" (Wayne Shorter) – 6:14
5. "Is It Necessary?" – 4:58

== Personnel ==
- Charles Earland – organ
- Bill Hardman – trumpet
- Frank Wess – tenor saxophone, flute
- Mack Goldsbury – tenor saxophone (track 2)
- Jimmy Ponder (tracks 1 & 2), Melvin Sparks (tracks 3–5) – guitar
- Grady Tate – drums
- Lawrence Killian – percussion
