= Skywalk (album) =

Studio album by Jimmy McGriff
- Released: 1984
- Recorded: March 19 and 20, 1984
- Studio: Fox Recording Studios, Rutherford, NJ
- Genre: Jazz
- Length: 40:36
- Label: Milestone; M-9126
- Producer: Bob Porter

Jimmy McGriff chronology
Countdown (1983)	Skywalk (1984)	State of the Art (1985)

Skywalk is an album by organist Jimmy McGriff recorded in 1984 and released on the Milestone label.

== Reception ==
Professional ratings
Review scores
Source	Rating
Allmusic	4/5 stars

Allmusic's Scott Yanow said: "Heard with a nonet on three numbers, a quintet on two songs, and an 11-piece outfit during his "Skywalk," McGriff is in his usual fine form ... Outside of altoist Bill Easley and guitarist Jimmy Ponder, the sidemen are pretty obscure, although quite capable in this setting".

== Track listing ==
All compositions by Jimmy McGriff except where noted

1. "Skywalk" – 8:43
2. "Easy Time" (Louie Bellson, Tommy Newsom) – 7:53
3. "Motoring Along" – 3:07
4. "Let's Stay Together" (Al Green, Willie Mitchell, Al Jackson Jr.) – 7:56
5. "Barb' Wine" (Wayne Boyd) – 7:25
6. "Jersey Bounce" (Tiny Bradshaw, Eddie Johnson, Bobby Plater, Robert B. Wright) – 5:32

== Personnel ==
- Jimmy McGriff – organ
- Glenn Kaye, Michael Ridley – trumpet (tracks 1, 2 & 6)
- Dominick Carelli – trombone (tracks 1, 2 & 6)
- Bill Easley – alto saxophone, tenor saxophone
- Arnold Sterling – alto saxophone (tracks 1 & 3–5)
- Coy Shockley – tenor saxophone
- James Brundige – baritone saxophone (tracks 1, 2 & 6)
- Jimmy Ponder (tracks 1, 2 & 6), Wayne Boyd (tracks 1 & 3–5) – guitar
- Don Williams − drums
