= Mr. Shing-a-Ling =

Studio album by Lou Donaldson
- Released: Mid January 1968
- Recorded: October 27, 1967
- Studio: Van Gelder Studio; Englewood Cliffs, NJ
- Genre: Jazz, soul blues
- Length: 37:46
- Label: Blue Note; BST 84271
- Producer: Francis Wolff

Lou Donaldson chronology
Alligator Bogaloo (1967)	Mr. Shing-a-Ling (1968)	Midnight Creeper (1968)

Professional ratings
Review scores
Source	Rating
AllMusic	2.5/5 stars

Mr. Shing-a-Ling is an album by American jazz saxophonist Lou Donaldson, recorded on October 27, 1967 and released on Blue Note in January 1968. The quintet features trumpeter Blue Mitchell, organist Lonnie Smith, guitarist Jimmy Ponder, and drummer Idris Muhammad (born Leo Morris).

== Track listing ==
Side 1
No.	Title	Writer(s)	Length
1.	"Ode to Billie Joe"	Bobbie Gentry	6:33
2.	"The Humpback"	Donaldson	5:28
3.	"The Shadow of Your Smile"	Johnny Mandel; Paul Francis Webster	6:25

Side 2
No.	Title	Writer(s)	Length
1.	"Peepin'"	Lonnie Smith	8:21
2.	"The Kid"	Harold Ousley	10:59

== Personnel ==
- Lou Donaldson – alto saxophone
- Blue Mitchell – trumpet (except "Ode to Billie Joe")
- Lonnie Smith – organ
- Jimmy Ponder – guitar
- Leo Morris – drums
