= Intensity (Charles Earland album) =

Studio album by Charles Earland
- Released: 1972
- Recorded: February 16–17, 1972
- Studios: Van Gelder Studio, Englewood Cliffs, New Jersey
- Genre: Jazz
- Length: 51:52
- Labels: Prestige; PR 10041
- Producer: Charles Earland

Charles Earland chronology
Soul Story (1971)	Intensity (1972)	Live at the Lighthouse (1972)

Intensity is an album by organist Charles Earland which was recorded in 1972 and released on the Prestige label.

== Reception ==
Professional ratings
Review scores
Source	Rating
Allmusic	4/5 stars
The Rolling Stone Jazz Record Guide	4/5 stars

Allmusic awarded the album 4 stars, stating: "Even if the performances on Intensity weren't excellent, this Charles Earland session would be required listening for jazz historians because it marked the last documented recording by Lee Morgan. Only two days after Intensity was recorded at Rudy Van Gelder's Englewood Cliffs, New Jersey studio on February 17, 1972, the influential trumpeter was shot and killed by his wife at the age of 33. Refusing to confine himself to hard bop, Morgan was exploring soul-jazz and fusion during the last years of his life -- and his enthusiasm for soul-jazz is hard to miss".

== Track listing ==
All compositions by Charles Earland except as indicated.

1. "Happy 'Cause I'm Goin' Home" (Robert Lamm) - 11:15
2. "Will You Still Love Me Tomorrow" (Gerry Goffin, Carole King) - 6:55
3. "'Cause I Love Her" - 9:38
4. "Morgan" - 10:25
5. "Lowdown" (Peter Cetera, Danny Seraphine) - 8:20 Bonus track on CD reissue
6. "Speedball" (Lee Morgan) - 5:19 Bonus track on CD reissue

== Personnel ==
- Charles Earland - organ
- Jon Faddis, Virgil Jones, Lee Morgan, Victor Paz - trumpet, flugelhorn
- Clifford Adams (on track 1 only), Dick Griffin, Jack Jeffers - trombone
- Hubert Laws - flute (and on track 4 only, piccolo flute)
- Billy Harper - tenor saxophone (on track 4 only)
- William Thorpe - baritone saxophone (on track 4 only)
- Maynard Parker (on track 4 only), John Fourie, Greg Millar - guitar
- Billy Cobham - drums
- Sonny Morgan - congas
