= The Groover (Jimmy McGriff album) =

Movin' Upside the Blues

Studio album by Jimmy McGriff
- Released: 1982
- Recorded: June 24, 1982
- Studio: Right Track Recording, NY
- Genre: Jazz
- Length: 42:16
- Label: Jazz America Marketing (JAM); JAM 009
- Producer: Esmond Edwards

Jimmy McGriff chronology
Movin' Upside the Blues (1982)	Movin' Upside the Blues (1982)	Countdown (1983)

The Groover is an album by organist Jimmy McGriff, recorded in 1982 and released on the Jazz America Marketing (JAM) label.

== Reception ==
The Washington Post's Mike Joyce wrote: "Jazz organist Jimmy McGriff demonstrates on The Groover that no musician has a monopoly on the blues. Certainly not these blues -- the late-night, after-hours kind that once routinely spilled from tired jukeboxes at closing time ... The Groover lives up to its title and a tradition well worth renewing".

== Track listing ==
1. "Night Train" (Jimmy Forrest) – 6:30
2. "When I Grow Too Old to Dream" (Sigmund Romberg, Oscar Hammerstein II) – 6:00
3. "Soft" (Tiny Bradshaw) – 5:43
4. "Song for My Father" (Horace Silver) – 4:57
5. "Mercy, Mercy, Mercy" (Joe Zawinul) – 5:40
6. "This One's for Ray" (Jimmy McGriff) – 8:26

== Personnel ==
- Jimmy McGriff – organ, Fender Rhodes piano, piano
- Arnold Sterling – alto saxophone
- Billy Butler – guitar
- Bob Cranshaw – electric bass
- Belton Evans − drums
- Ray Mantilla – percussion
