= Soul Story =

Studio album by Charles Earland
- Released: 1971
- Recorded: April 3 and May 3, 1971
- Studio: Van Gelder Studio, Englewood Cliffs, New Jersey
- Genre: Jazz
- Length: 34:37
- Label: Prestige; PR 10018
- Producer: Charles Earland

Charles Earland chronology
Living Black! (1970)	Soul Story (1971)	Intensity (1972)

Soul Story is an album by organist Charles Earland which was recorded in 1971 and released on the Prestige label.

== Reception ==
Professional ratings
Review scores
Source	Rating
Allmusic	3/5 stars

Allmusic awarded the album 3 stars.

== Track listing ==
All compositions by Charles Earland except where noted

1. "Betty's Dilemma" – 8:12
2. "Love Story" (Francis Lai) – 10:10
3. "One for Scotty" – 6:55
4. "My Scorpio Lady" – 2:20
5. "I Was Made to Love Her" (Stevie Wonder, Lula Mae Hardaway, Henry Cosby, Sylvia Moy) – 2:50
6. "Happy Medium" – 4:10

== Personnel ==
- Charles Earland – organ, vocals
- Gary Chandler (tracks 1 & 2), Virgil Jones (tracks 3–6) – trumpet
- Clifford Adams Jr. – trombone (tracks 3–6)
- Jimmy Vass – flute, soprano saxophone, alto saxophone (tracks 1 & 2)
- Arthur Grant – tenor saxophone, flute (tracks 3–6)
- Houston Person – tenor saxophone (tracks 1 & 2)
- Maynard Parker – guitar
- Jesse Kilpatrick Jr. (tracks 1 & 2), Billy "Kentucky" Wilson (tracks 3–6) – drums
- Buddy Caldwell – congas, tambourine (tracks 1 & 2)
- Arthur Jenkins – congas (tracks 3–6)
