= Smoking room =

Room intended for smoking

A smoking room (or smoking lounge) is a room which is specifically provided and furnished for smoking, generally in buildings where smoking is otherwise prohibited.

== Locations and facilities ==
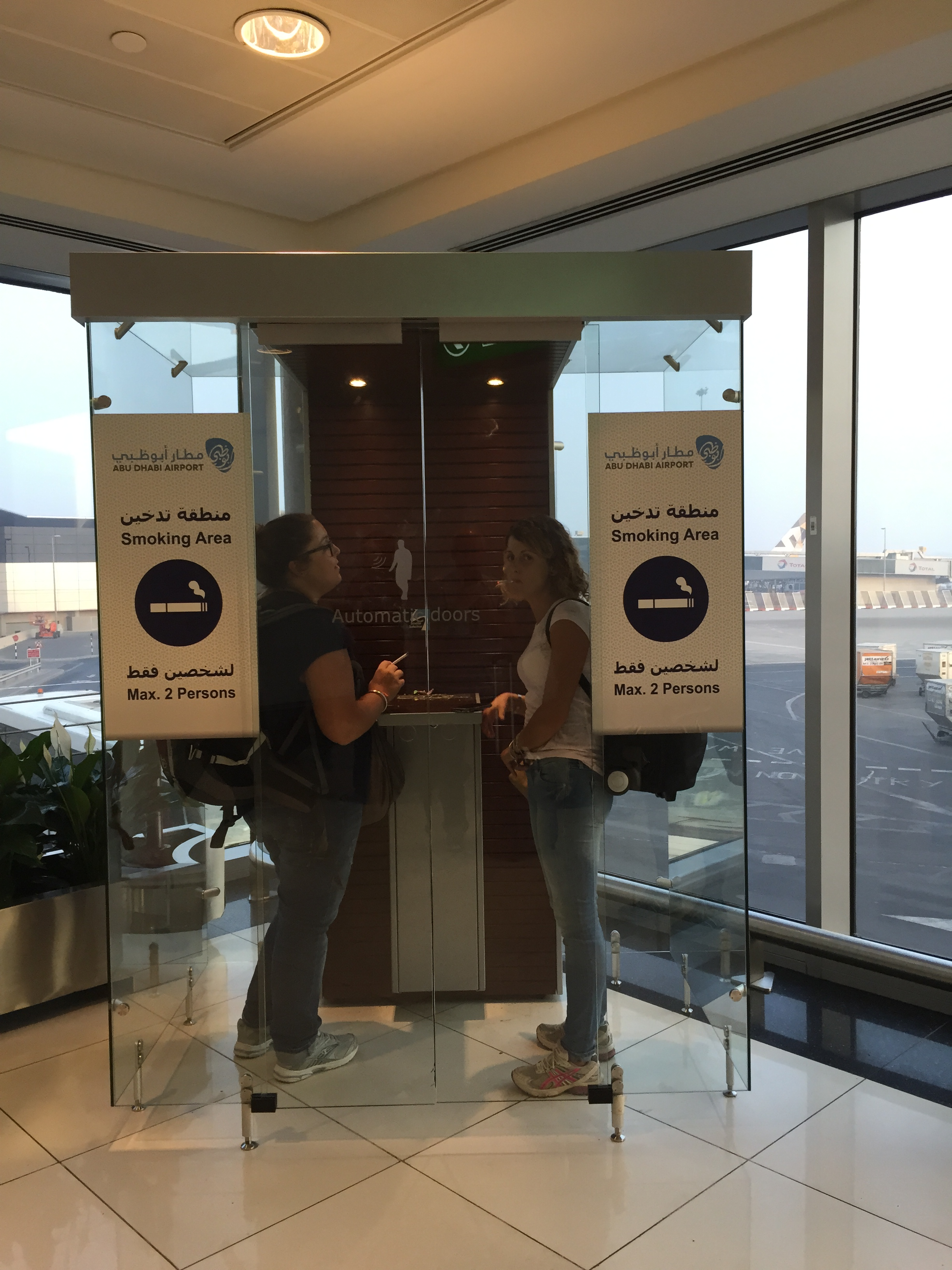
Smoking area inside the airport in Abu Dhabi.

Smoking rooms can be found in public buildings such as airports, and in semi-public buildings such as workplaces. Such rooms are commonly equipped with chairs, ashtrays and ventilation, and are usually free to enter, although there may be a smoking age restriction. A cigarette company sometimes sponsors these smoking rooms, displaying its brand names on the room walls and financing the room or its maintenance. Cigarette companies have worked hard to ensure smoking was accommodated in major airports, which are high-profile locations serving many people who are often bored or nervous. Initially, providing smoking and no smoking areas was their goal, but when that policy failed they fell back on ventilated smoking rooms.

Field studies of enclosed smoking rooms in airports, including rooms with separate ventilation systems, have reported levels of fine particulate matter from second-hand smoke that exceed health-based air quality standards, and found that smoke particles can leak into adjacent non-smoking areas, exposing workers and members of the public. World Health Organization (WHO) Framework Convention on Tobacco Control (FCTC) analysis summarising this research states that designated smoking rooms and similar partial measures do not fully protect people in indoor public places from second-hand smoke.

== Historical use in private British houses ==
When the Crimean War during the 1850s popularized Turkish tobacco in Great Britain, smoking gained in fashionable popularity there but was considered indelicate. After dinner in a large private house, the gentlemen might retreat from the ladies to a smoking room, furnished with velvet curtains and decorated to masculine tastes (wealthy owners would often choose Turkish themes and weapons collections), and replace his tail coat with a comfortable velvet smoking jacket and cap. The velvet was intended to absorb the smoke, to avoid contaminating other rooms and clothes.

In the United Kingdom smoking became illegal on 1 July 2007 in any enclosed public place, so that smoking rooms cannot be provided and facilities must be outdoors; apart from private homes, almost the only legal exception is for smoking rooms in tobacconists where customers may sample the wares. Mental health units in the NHS providing long term in-patient care also have an exemption allowing the provision of designated smoking rooms for patients.

== See also ==
- Smoking ban
- Passive smoking
