= Smokin' (Charles Earland album) =

Studio album by Charlie Earland
- Released: 1977
- Recorded: 1969 and 1977
- Studio: Van Gelder Studio, Englewood Cliffs, NJ
- Genre: Jazz
- Length: 39:14
- Label: Muse; MR 5126
- Producer: Ozzie Cadena

Charlie Earland chronology
| Perception (1977) | Smokin' (1977) | Mama Roots (1977) |

Smokin' is an album by organist Charlie Earland which was recorded in 1969 and 1977 and released on the Muse label. The album contains two new recordings and reissues three tracks from Earland's 1969 album Soul Crib.

== Reception ==
Professional ratings
Review scores
| Source | Rating |
|---|---|
| AllMusic | 2.5/5 stars |

The AllMusic review by Ron Wynn stated "Fine mid-'70s sextet set featuring Earland's customary soul-jazz, blues, and funk, with uptempo and ballad originals".

== Track listing ==
1. "Penn Relays" (Charles Earland) – 6:00
2. "Danny Boy's Soul" (Dave Paul) – 3:50
3. "Milestones #2" (Miles Davis) – 8:50
4. "Soon It's Gonna Rain" (Harvey Schmidt, Tom Jones) – 9:30
5. "Strangers in the Night" (Bert Kaempfert, Charles Singleton, Eddie Snyder) – 5:30

== Personnel ==
- Charles Earland – organ
- George Coleman, Dave Schnitter (track 1) – tenor saxophone
- Jimmy Ponder – guitar
- Bobby Durham (tracks 1 & 2), Walter Perkins (tracks 3–5) – drums
- Herb Fisher – percussion (track 1)
