= Smokin' (Bobby Miller album) =

Studio album by Bobby Miller
- Released: 2001
- Studio: CRC and Soto Sound, Chicago
- Genre: Neo jazz/funk
- Length: 65:38
- Label: Intercept Recordings
- Producer: Bobby Miller

Bobby Miller chronology
| The Whole Theory (2000) | Smokin' (2001) | Meditation (2003) |

Smokin' is the fourth studio album by Bobby Miller, released in 2001. It signifies a turning point in production style, introducing a more organic and glossy sound.

Miller produced and recorded the album in Chicago. It was engineered by Jerry Soto and Ron Gresham, and the final mix was mastered by Brian Jensen.

Professional ratings
Review scores
| Source | Rating |
|---|---|
| Allmusic | link |
| Allmusic | link |

== Track listing ==
1. "Smokin'" - 3:15
2. "Have I Told You" - 3:41
3. "Hava Evah" - 2:32
4. "Universal Youth" - 5:49
5. "Don't Sunshine on My Rain" - 4:23
6. "Urban Blue (Bobby's Concerto, A Selection)" - 0:53
7. "It's Funky!" - 3:02
8. "On the Road (Trynna Get Home)" - 2:49
9. "Never Gonna See You Again" - 2:50
10. "Foggy Eyes" - 3:01
11. "As Long as It Takes" - 3:32
12. "Keysha's Smile" - 3:56
13. "Precious Love" - 3:40
14. "Bring It Down" - 3:54
15. "Rockin' the Night" - 3:40
16. "You Gotta Do Better" - 3:43
17. "Love in the First Degree" - 3:21
18. "Don't Sunshine (Reprise)" - 1:39
19. "He" - 2:54
20. "Free and Easy" - 3:04

== Album credits ==
- Bobby Miller - lead vocals, organ, percussion, bass guitar, trumpet, acoustic guitar, production
- Jerry Soto - lead guitar
