= Smoker (surname) =

Smoker is a surname. Notable people with the surname include:

- Barbara Smoker (1923–2020), British Humanist activist and freethought advocate
- Craig Smoker (born 1978), Australian rules footballer
- George Smoker (1856–1925), English cricketer and footballer
- Henry Smoker (1881–1966), English cricketer and footballer, son of George Smoker
- Jeff Smoker (born 1981), American football quarterback
- Josh Smoker (born 1988), American baseball player
- Paul Smoker (1941–2016), American jazz trumpeter
