= Boss Organ =

Studio album by The Charlie Earland Trio
- Released: 1969
- Recorded: 1966
- Studio: Van Gelder Studio, Englewood Cliffs, NJ
- Genre: Jazz
- Length: 33:50
- Label: Choice; CMG-517
- Producer: Ozzie Cadena

Charlie Earland chronology
Boss Organ (1969)	Soul Crib (1969)

Boss Organ is an album by organist Charlie Earland which was recorded in 1966 and released on the Choice label in 1969.

== Track listing ==
All compositions by Charles Earland except where noted

1. "Danny Boy Soul" (Dave Paul) – 2:50
2. "Millology" – 4:30
3. "Six Twice" – 4:50
4. "Mustang" – 5:05
5. "Tonk" (Ray Bryant) – 5:45
6. "Rock-a-Bye Your Baby" (Jean Schwartz, Sam M. Lewis, Joe Young) – 4:35
7. "Wha's Happinin'" – 6:15

== Personnel ==
- Charles Earland – organ
- Jimmy Ponder – guitar
- Bobby Durham – drums
