= Live at the Lighthouse (Charles Earland album) =

Live album by Charles Earland
- Released: 1972
- Recorded: October 9, 1972
- Venue: The Lighthouse, Hermosa Beach, California
- Genre: Jazz
- Label: Prestige; PR 10050
- Producer: Charles Earland

Charles Earland chronology
Intensity (1972)	Live at the Lighthouse (1972)	Charles III (1973)

Live at the Lighthouse is a live album by organist Charles Earland which was recorded at the Lighthouse Café in Hermosa Beach in 1972 and released on the Prestige label.

== Reception ==
Professional ratings
Review scores
Source	Rating
Allmusic	4/5 stars

Allmusic awarded the album 4 stars stating "This date from 1972 at the legendary Lighthouse club offers a stunning vision of Earland the soul organist, not the jazzman. Certainly there is plenty of improvisation here and many unexpected twists and turns in the arrangements, with decisions made and reacted to on the spot. But that's not what makes this date so special. This is Earland digging so deeply into a groove emotionally that he's unconcerned with anything but feeling... This is a demanding gig -- it demands that you stay on your feet for its entirety. Make sure no one at your next throwdown has heart disease before you spin it".

== Track listing ==
All compositions by Charles Earland except as indicated

1. "Smiling" (Sylvester Stewart) - 6:36
2. "We've Only Just Begun" (Roger Nichols, Paul Williams) - 5:50
3. "Black Gun" - 8:17
4. "Spinky" - 6:13
5. "Freedom Jazz Dance" (Eddie Harris) - 6:16
6. "Moontrane" (Woody Shaw) - 5:27

== Personnel ==
- Charles Earland - organ
- Elmer Coles - trumpet
- Clifford Adams - trombone
- James Vass - alto saxophone, soprano saxophone
- Maynard Parker - guitar
- Darryl Washington - drums
- Kenneth Nash - congas
