= Smoking cap =

Caps worn by men while smoking

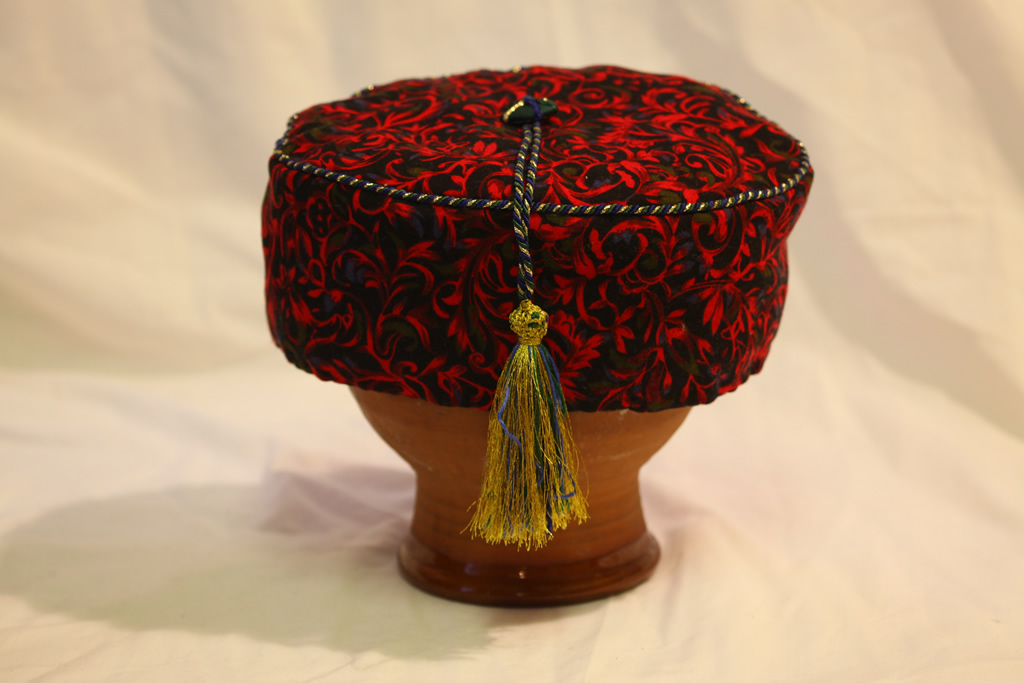
A nineteenth-century smoking cap

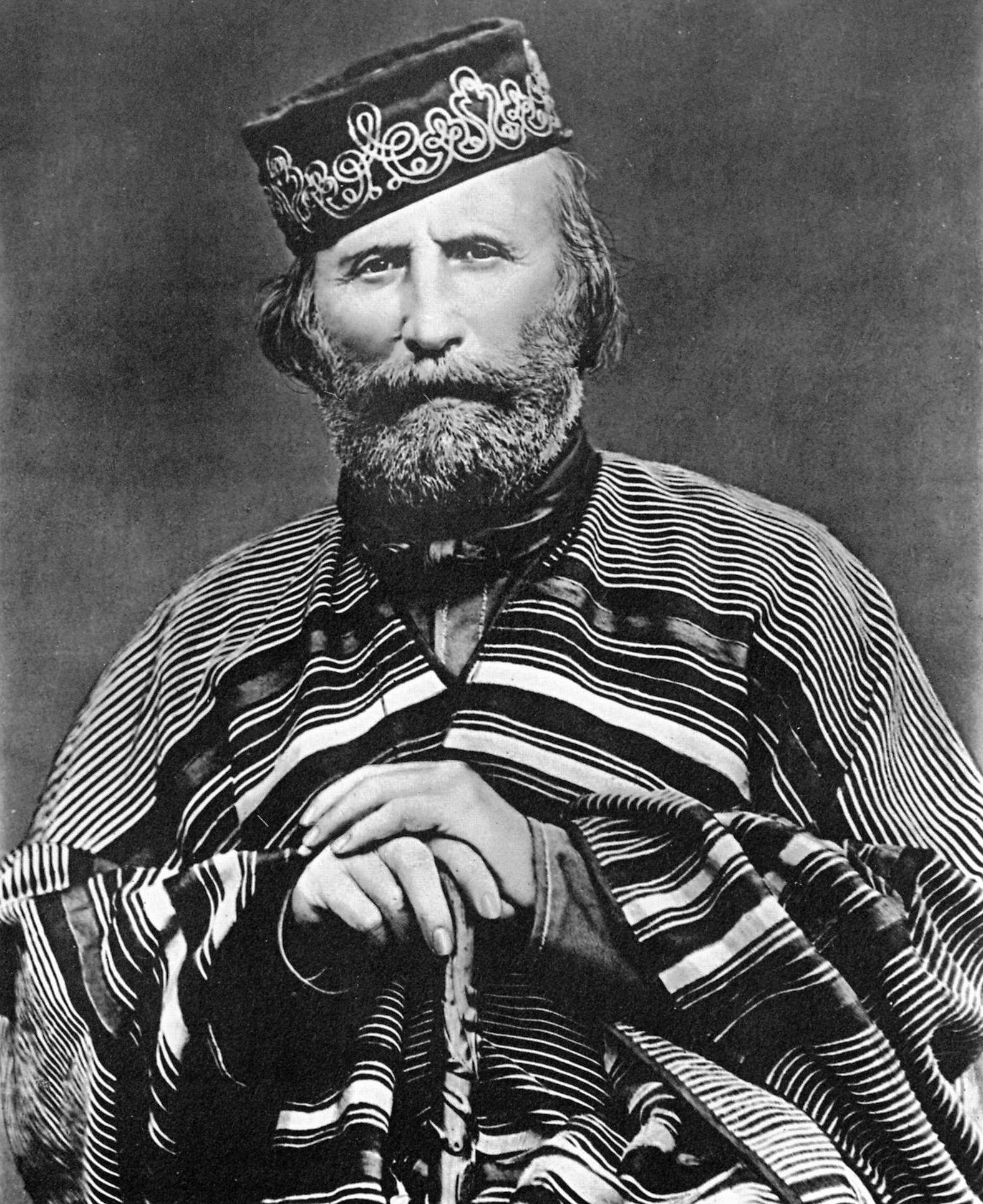
Giuseppe Garibaldi with his characteristic smoking cap

Smoking caps, also known as lounging caps, were Victorian headwear worn by men while smoking to stop their hair from smelling of tobacco smoke. They were soft caps, shaped like a squat cylinder or close fitting like a knit cap, and usually heavily embroidered with a tassel on top.

== History ==
Smoking caps were originally worn for warmth, but continued with their new use after improvements in Victorian heating. They were popular in the period 1840–1880, and usually used by gentlemen in the privacy of their homes. The need for smoking caps, and smoking wear generally, arose from the social more of not smoking in front of women, and not smelling of smoke when one returned to their presence. They were often a gift from women, who made them themselves to give to male partners.

They were often worn with a smoking jacket, but while the jacket was more or less de rigueur, the cap was optional. Neither was worn by everyone, as smoking was not as popular as it became in the twentieth century, although they could also be worn as part of a man's loungewear outfit with no connection to smoking. The decoration of the cap was often very ornate and colourful. Designs were particularly influenced by the designs of the Near and Middle East, a common Victorian influence in many other areas.

== See also ==
- Chalice (pipe)
- Hookah
- List of hat styles
- List of headgear
- Tobacco pipe
