= Soul Crib =

Studio album by The Charlie Earland Trio featuring George Coleman
- Released: 1969
- Recorded: 1969
- Studio: Van Gelder Studio, Englewood Cliffs, NJ
- Genre: Jazz
- Length: 39:14
- Label: Choice; CMG-520
- Producer: Ozzie Cadena

Charlie Earland chronology
Boss Organ (1966)	Soul Crib (1969)	Black Power (1969)

Soul Crib is an album by organist Charlie Earland which was recorded in 1969 and released on the Choice label. Most of the tracks were reissued on Muse Records in 1977 with three tracks on Smokin' and three on Mama Roots.

== Reception ==
Professional ratings
Review scores
Source	Rating
AllMusic	3/5 stars

The AllMusic review by Wichael Erlewine simply stated "Earland with George Coleman on tenor sax, Jimmy Ponder on guitar, and Walter Perkins on drums".

== Track listing ==
All compositions by Charles Earland except where noted

1. "Soon It's Gonna Rain" (Harvey Schmidt, Tom Jones) – 7:30
2. "Strangers in the Night" (Bert Kaempfert, Charles Singleton, Eddie Snyder) – 5:30
3. "Old Folks" (Dedette Lee Hill, Willard Robison) – 5:30
4. "The Dozens" – 2:50
5. "Milestones #2" (Miles Davis) – 3:30
6. "Mus' Be LSD" – 6:30
7. "Undecided" (Charlie Shavers, Sid Robin) – 6:45

== Personnel ==
- Charles Earland – organ
- George Coleman – tenor saxophone
- Jimmy Ponder – guitar
- Walter Perkins – drums
