= Smoking concert =

Live theatre performances for men only

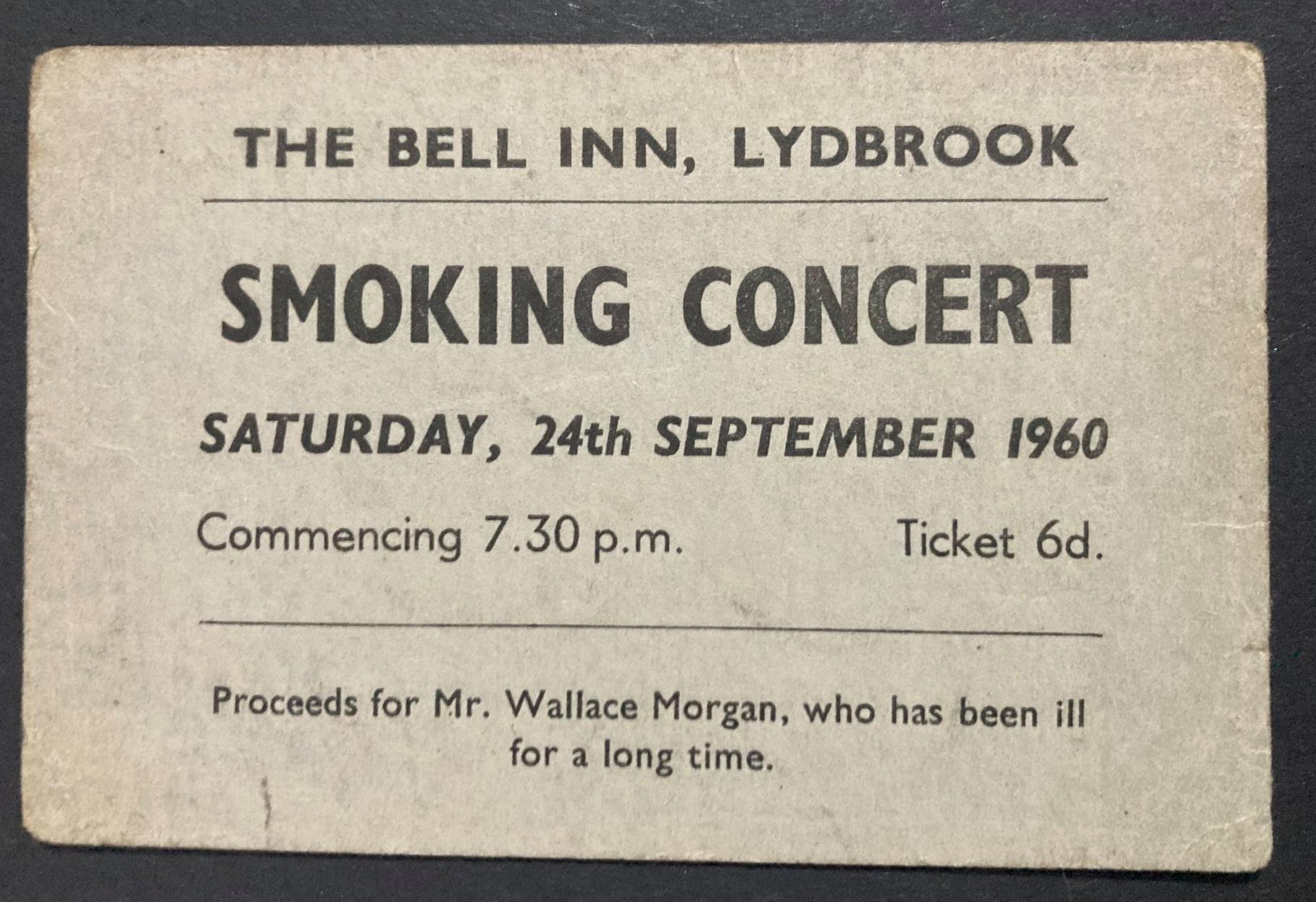
A ticket to a smoking concert held at the Bell Inn, Lydbrook in the Forest of Dean, UK

Smoking concerts were live performances, usually of music, before an audience of men only, popular during the Victorian era. Smoking concerts emerged in the 1860s as private entertainment organised by aristocratic and bourgeois amateur music societies and were intended exclusively for men, but later developed into more socially mixed audience events that included women. These social occasions were instrumental in introducing new musical forms to the public. At these functions men would smoke and speak of politics while listening to live music. These popular gatherings were sometimes held at hotels.

At the University of Cambridge, the Footlights dramatic club continues to use the term “Smokers” when staging informal evenings of sketches and stand-up comedy at the ADC Theatre.

Oxford college archives describe “Smokers” as less formal college entertainment, arranged by junior common rooms, at which male undergraduates could relax over light performances, smoking and drinking while also discussing politics and current events away from women.

Although the concerts are now obsolete, the term continued and is used for student-organised variety performances, especially at Oxford and Cambridge. Annual smoking concerts were held at Imperial College London into the 1980s and continue at Glasgow University Union.

The saying "Booking for smoking concerts now" came into use at this time meaning that a person had recovered and was in the prime of health. This saying is used in the works of writer P.G. Wodehouse.

College archivists have noted that, in P. G. Wodehouse’s usage, the expression signalled that a man had recovered sufficiently from illness to go out again and take part in social life.

The Liverpool Medical Students Society at the University of Liverpool School of Medicine still hold an annual smoking concert, a tradition going back 130 years. Each of the five year groups present a play annually.

== Smoker (lecture) ==
The Sixty-fourth Annual Convention of the Theta Delta Chi included regular sessions, sightseeing trips, luncheons, a banquet, a theatre party, and a smoker, that featured a lecture by Donald Baxter MacMillan, a companion of Admiral Robert E. Peary on his north polar trip.
