= Smoking jacket =

Men's casual loungewear

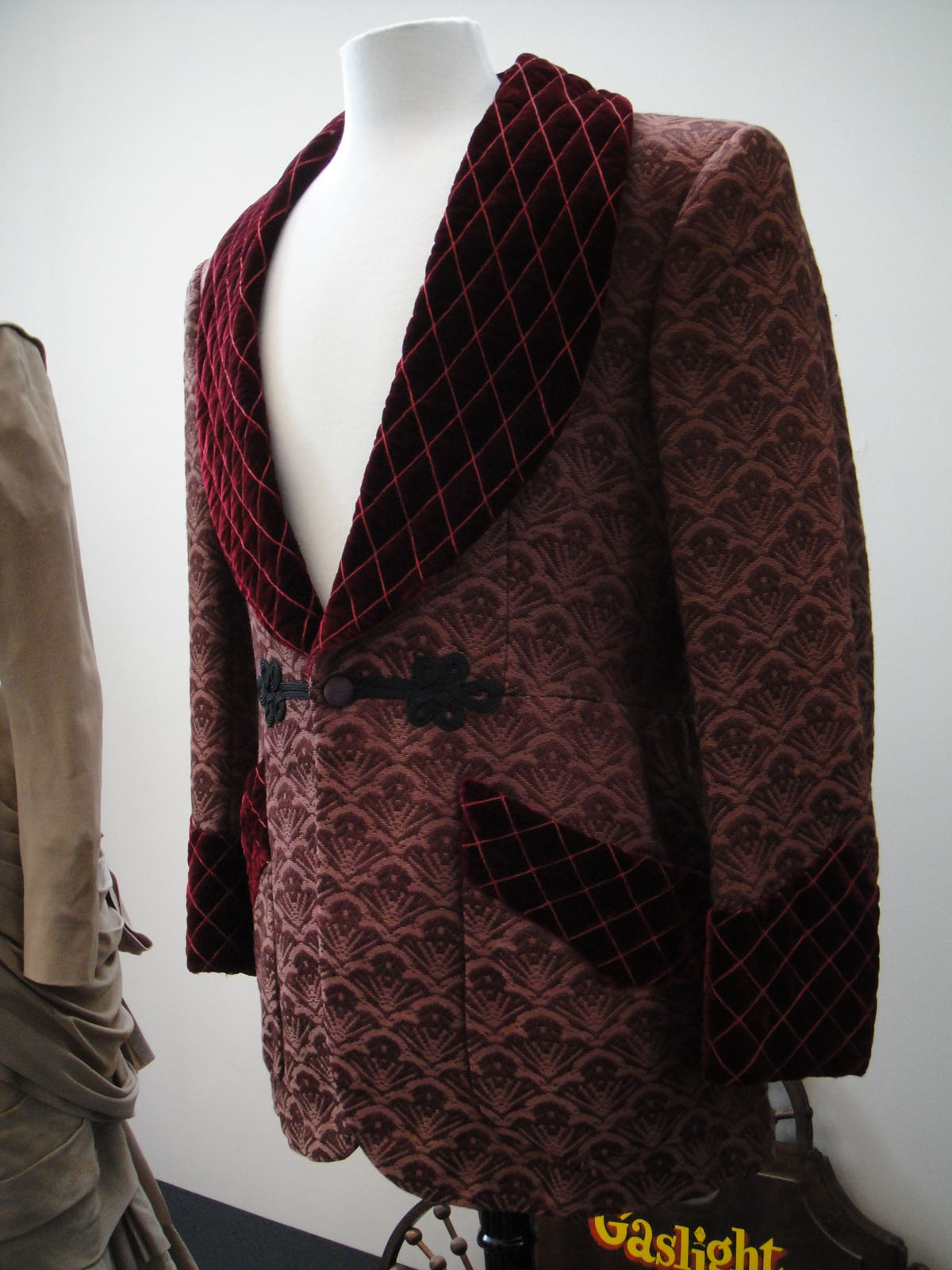
A smoking jacket in burgundy with the typical shawl collar, frog fastening and turn-up cuffs. From the 1944 film Gaslight.

A smoking jacket is an informal men's style of lounge jacket originally intended for tobacco smoking. Designed in the 1850s, a traditional smoking jacket has a shawl collar, turn-up cuffs, and is closed with either toggle or button fastenings, or with a tie belt. It is usually made from velvet and/or silk.

Originating in the 1850s, The Gentleman's Magazine of London, England, defined the smoking jacket as a "kind of short robe de chambre [i.e., a banyan], of velvet, cashmere, plush, merino or printed flannel, lined with bright colours, ornamented with brandebourgs [i.e., frog fasteners], olives or large buttons."

The smoking jacket later evolved into the dinner jacket, essentially a dress coat without tails, following an example set by Edward, Prince of Wales (later King Edward VII) in 1865. The smoking jacket has remained in its original form and is commonly worn when smoking pipes and cigars.

== Etymology ==
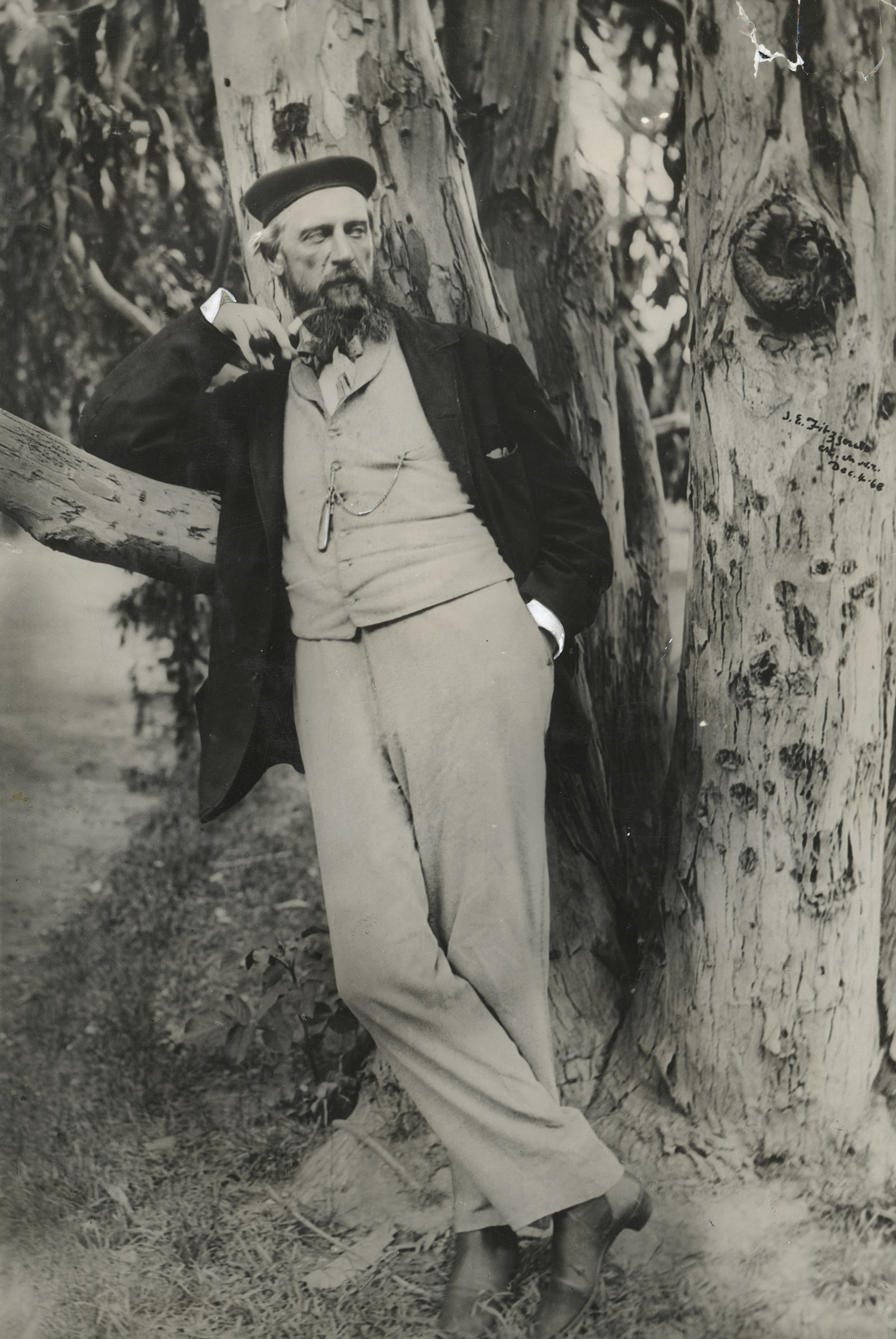
James FitzGerald (1818–1896) wearing a smoking jacket in 1868.

The smoking jacket is named due to its association with tobacco smoking.

As a false friend, the name carried on to its derivation the dinner jacket in several non-English languages. In Bulgarian, Catalan, Czech, Danish, Dutch, Estonian, Finnish, French, German, Greek, Hebrew, Hungarian, Icelandic, Italian, Lithuanian, Norwegian, Polish, Portuguese, Romanian, Russian, Slovak, Spanish, Swedish, Turkish, and other European languages, the term smoking indicates a dinner jacket, or a tuxedo jacket.

== History ==
In the 17th century, goods began flowing into Europe from Asia and the Americas, bringing in spices, tobacco, coffee, and silks. It became fashionable to be depicted in one's portrait wearing a silk robe de chambre, or dressing gown. One of the earliest mentions of this garment comes from Samuel Pepys, who rented a silk gown for his portrait because he could not afford a new one:

Thence home and eat one mouthful, and so to Hale's and there sat until almost quite dark upon working my gowne, which I hired to be drawn (in) it—an Indian gown, and I do see all the reason to expect a most excellent picture of it. —Diary, 30 March 1666

In the 18th century, gentlemen often referred to a specific style of "night gown" called the banyan, a knee-length robe, a more comfortable design than the justaucorps, onto which shawl collars became prevalent. The shorter smoking jacket evolved from these garments.

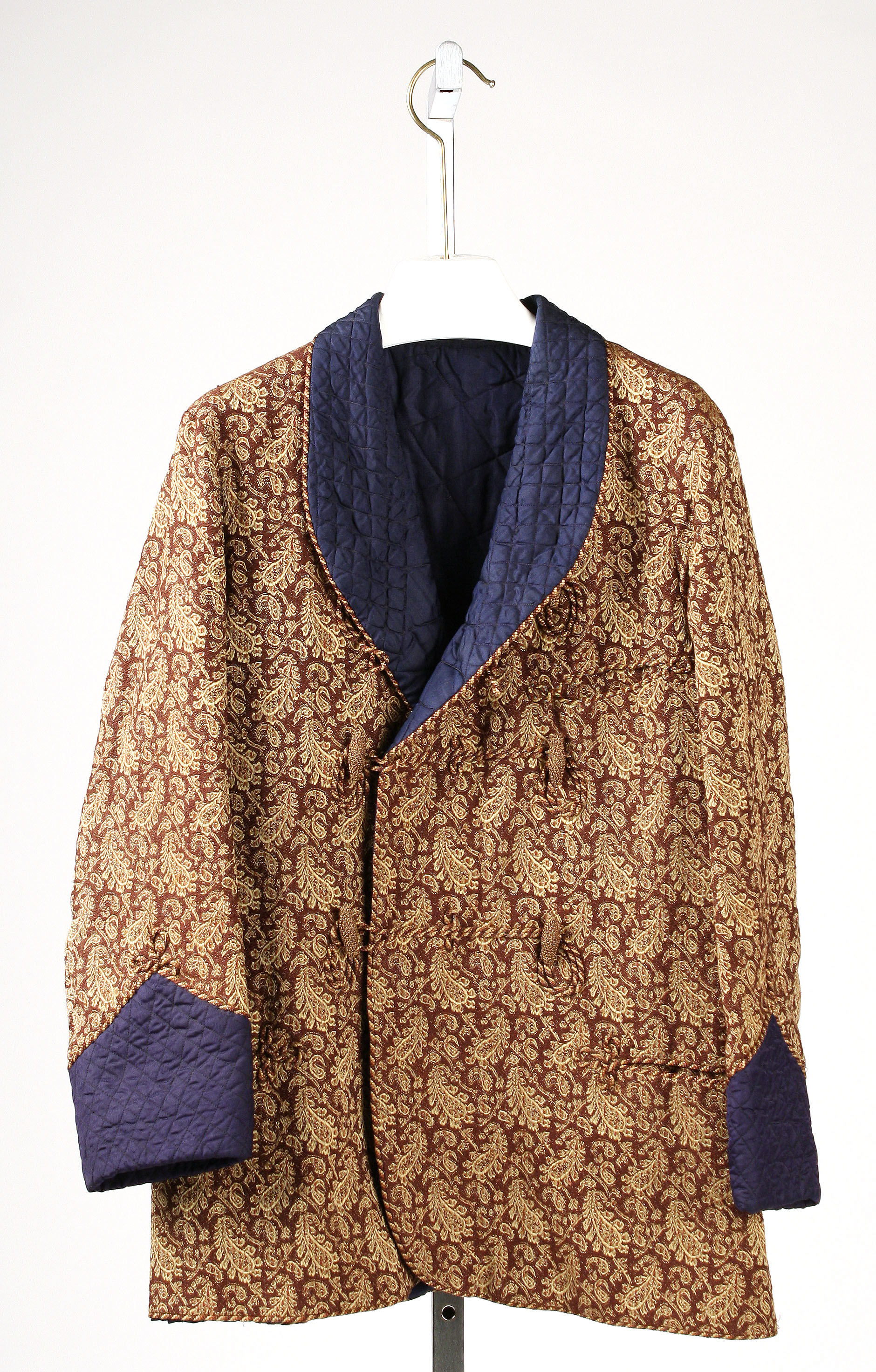
A smoking jacket from the 1860s exhibited at the Metropolitan Museum of Art, New York City, United States.

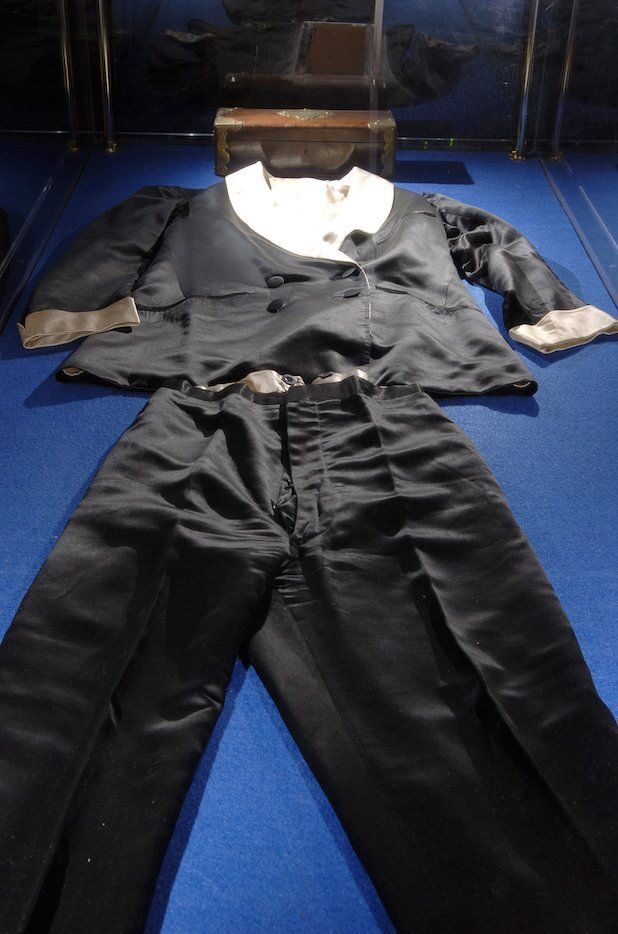
A silk smoking suit with shawl collar and gold facings from 1912.

To protect their clothes, many men would wear their robes-de-chambre while smoking in private. These robes acted as a barrier against ash and smoke, while also allowing them to showcase another garment from their collection. When the Crimean War of the 1850s popularised Turkish tobacco in Britain, smoking gained in popularity. After dinner, a gentleman might wear a smoking jacket and retreat to a smoking room. The jacket was intended to absorb the smoke from his cigar or pipe and protect his clothing from falling ash.

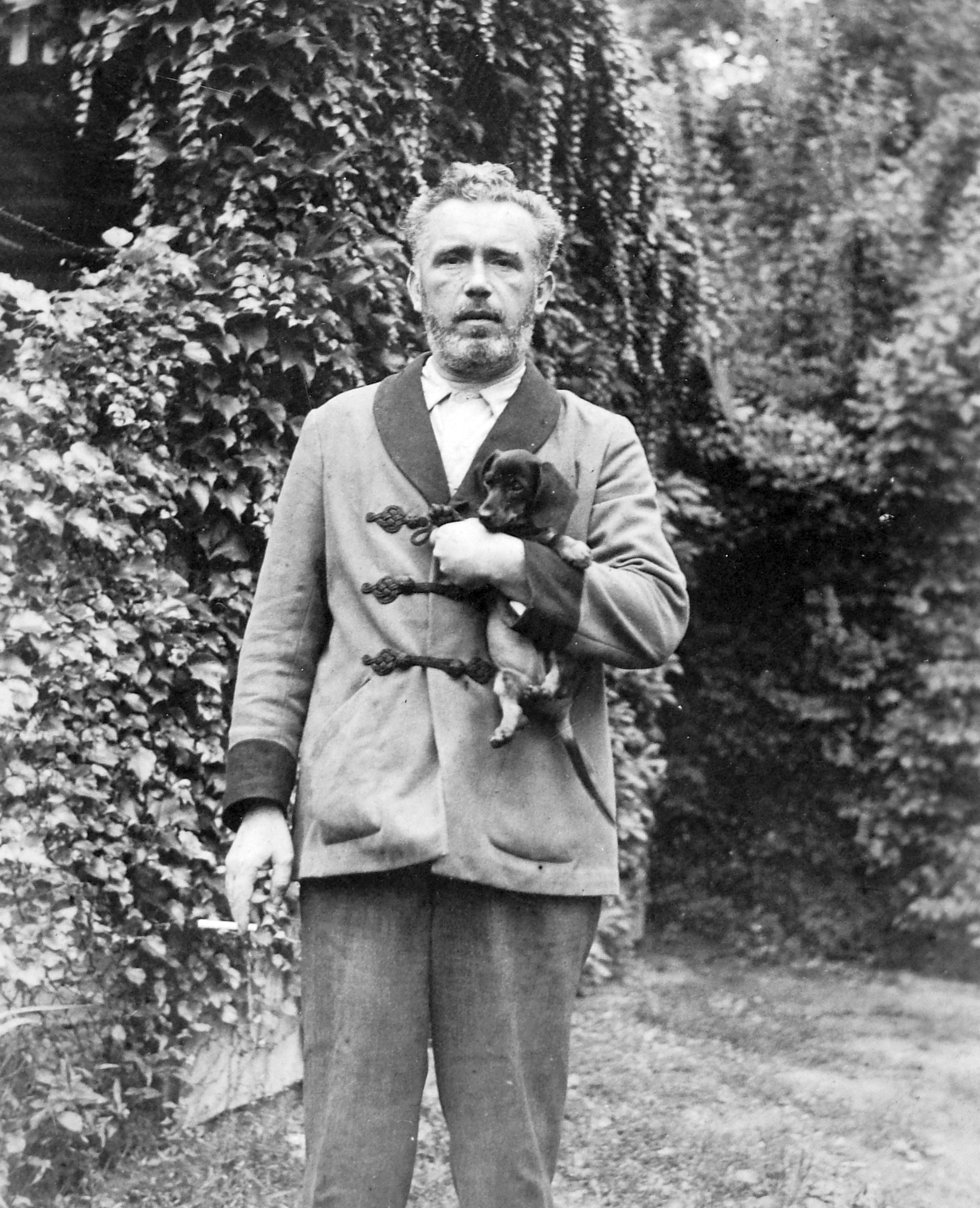
A gentleman in a smoking jacket with a cigarette and a puppy (1930)

The smoking jacket remained popular into the 20th century. An editorial in The Washington Post in 1902 wrote that the smoking jacket was "synonymous with comfort", while a Pennsylvania newspaper in 1908 stated that it would be "putting it mildly to say that a new House Coat or Smoking Jacket will give any man reason for elation". Due to its comfort, it was also worn by men as a leisure garment outside of smoking. Famous wearers included Fred Astaire (who was buried in a smoking jacket), Cary Grant, Dean Martin, Jon Pertwee, and Frank Sinatra.

While smoking jackets declined in popularity from the 1950s, a minority of wearers persisted; Playboy mogul Hugh Hefner was a notable example. In its January/February 1999 issue, Cigar Aficionado stated that the smoking jacket ought to be brought back, perhaps as an "alternative type of formalwear".

== See also ==
- Bathrobe
- Black tie
- Smoking cap
