= Charles Earland =

American jazz organist

- Earland in 1983

Background information
- Born: May 24, 1941; Philadelphia, Pennsylvania, U.S.
- Died: December 11, 1999 (aged 58) Kansas City, Missouri, U.S.
- Genres: Jazz; soul jazz; blues; funk
- Occupations: Musician; composer
- Instrument: Organ
- Years active: 1966–1999
- Labels: Prestige; Muse; Mercury; Columbia; Milestone

Charles Earland (May 24, 1941 – December 11, 1999) was an American jazz organist and pianist.

== Biography ==
Earland was born in Philadelphia and learned to play the saxophone in high school. He played tenor with Jimmy McGriff at the age of 17 and in 1960 formed his first group. He started playing the organ after playing with Pat Martino, and joined Lou Donaldson's band from 1968 to 1969.

The group that he led from 1970, including Grover Washington, Jr., was successful, and he eventually started playing soprano saxophone and synthesizer. His hard, simmering grooves earned him the nickname "The Mighty Burner".

In 1978, Earland hit the disco/club scene with a track recorded on Mercury Records called "Let The Music Play", written by Randy Muller from the funk group Brass Construction. The record was in the U.S. charts for five weeks and reached number 46 in the UK Singles Chart. With Earland's playing on synthesizer, the track also has an uncredited female vocalist. He had several moderate Billboard R&B chart hits in the mid-1970s and early 1980s on Mercury and later Columbia Records.

Earland traveled extensively from 1988 until his death in 1999, performing throughout the U.S. and abroad. One of the highlights of his latter years was playing at the Berlin Jazz Festival in 1994. Among the musicians that performed with him at the Berlin Jazz Festival was the Alabama-born Chicago resident, Zimbabu Hamilton on the drums.

Earland died in Kansas City, Missouri, of heart failure at the age of 58.

== Discography ==
=== As leader ===
- Boss Organ (Choice, 1969) – rec. 1966
- Soul Crib (Choice, 1969)
- Black Power (Rare Bird, 1969)
- Black Talk! (Prestige, 1970) – rec. 1969
- Black Drops (Prestige, 1970)
- Living Black! (Prestige, 1971) – live rec. 1970
- Freakin' Off (Big Chance, 1971) – live
- Soul Story (Prestige, 1971)
- Intensity (Prestige, 1972)
- Live at the Lighthouse (Prestige, 1972) – live
- Charles III (Prestige, 1973)
- The Dynamite Brothers (Prestige, 1973)
- Leaving This Planet (Prestige, 1974)
- Kharma (Prestige, 1974) – live
- Odyssey (Mercury, 1976)
- The Great Pyramid (Mercury, 1976)
- Revelation (Mercury, 1977)
- Smokin' (Muse, 1977)
- Mama Roots (Muse, 1977)
- Perceptions (Mercury, 1978)
- Infant Eyes (Muse, 1978)
- Pleasant Afternoon (Muse, 1978)
- Coming to You Live (Columbia, 1980) – live
- In the Pocket... (Muse, 1982)
- Earland's Jam (Columbia, 1982)
- Earland's Street Themes (Columbia, 1983)
- Front Burner (Milestone, 1988)
- Third Degree Burn (Milestone, 1989)
- Whip Appeal (Muse, 1990)
- Unforgettable (Muse, 1991)
- I Ain't Jivin'...I'm Jammin' (Muse, 1992)
- Ready 'n' Able (Muse, 1995)
- Blowing the Blues Away (HighNote, 1997)
- Charles Earland's Jazz Organ Summit (Cannonball, 1997) – live
- Slammin' & Jammin' (Savant, 1998)
- Cookin' with the Mighty Burner (HighNote, 1999)
- Charles Earland Live (Cannonball, 1999) – live
- Stomp! (HighNote, 2000)
- If Only for One Night (HighNote, 2002)

=== LP/CD compilations ===
- Burners (Prestige MPP 2501, 1980)
- Organomically Correct (32 Jazz, 1999; reissued on Savoy Jazz in 2003)
- The Almighty Burner (32 Jazz, 2000; reissued on Savoy Jazz in 2003)
- Charlie's Greatest Hits (Prestige, 2000) (compilation drawn from 4 different Earland albums, and 1 track from Boogaloo Joe Jones' Right On Brother + 2 previously unreleased live tracks from the Living Black! sessions)
- Anthology (Soul Brother [UK] Records, 2000) (2CD compilation)
- Charles Earland In Concert: At The Montreux Jazz Festival And The Lighthouse (Prestige, 2002) (compilation of Live At The Lighthouse + Kharma)
- Funk Fantastique (Prestige, 2004) (compilation of Charles III + 4 bonus tracks from the same sessions)
- The Mighty Burner: The Best Of His HighNote Recordings (HighNote, 2004)
- Scorched, Seared & Smokin': The Best Of "The Mighty Burner" (HighNote, 2011) (3CD compilation of Blowing The Blues Away, Slammin' & Jammin' , Cookin' With The Mighty Burner, Stomp!, If Only For One Night, plus 3 tracks with Earland backing vocalist Irene Reid)
- Coming To You Live/Earland's Jam/Earland's Street Themes (Robinsongs/Cherry Red [UK], 2019) (3LP-on-2CD compilation + 6 bonus tracks)

=== As sideman ===
With Lou Donaldson

- Say It Loud! (Blue Note, 1968)
- Hot Dog (Blue Note, 1969)
- Everything I Play Is Funky (Blue Note, 1970)

With George Freeman

- Introducing George Freeman Live with Charlie Earland Sitting In (Giant Step, 1971)
- Franticdiagnosis (Bam-Boo, 1972)

With Willis Jackson

- Bar Wars (Muse, 1977)
- Nothing Butt... (Muse, 1983)

With Irene Reid

- Million Dollar Secret (Savant, 1997)
- I Ain't Doing Too Bad (Savant, 1999)
- The Uptown Lowdown (Savant, 2000)

With others

- Eric Alexander, Alexander the Great (HighNote, 2000)
- Rusty Bryant, Soul Liberation (Prestige, 1970)
- Bob DeVos. Breaking the Ice (Savant, 1999)
- Sonny Hopson, Life & Mad ...Featuring Charlie Earland (Giant Step, 1970)
- Boogaloo Joe Jones, Right On Brother (Prestige, 1970)
- Houston Person, The Nearness of You (Muse, 1977)
