= Hubert Laws discography =

American Saxophonist

Hubert Laws (born November 10, 1939) is an American flutist and saxophonist with a career spanning over 50 years in jazz, classical, and other music genres. He is one of the most recognized and respected jazz flutists in the history of jazz. Laws is one of the few classical artists who has also mastered jazz, pop, and rhythm-and-blues genres, moving effortlessly from one repertory to another.

== As leader ==
Year	Title	Label	notes
1964	The Laws of Jazz	Atlantic	
1966	Flute By-Laws	Atlantic	
1968	Laws' Cause	Atlantic	
1969	Crying Song	CTI	
1970	Afro-Classic	CTI	
1971	The Rite of Spring	CTI	
1972	Wild Flower	Atlantic	
1972	Morning Star	CTI	
1973	Carnegie Hall	CTI	
1974	In the Beginning	CTI	
1975	The Chicago Theme	CTI	
1975	The San Francisco Concert	CTI	
1976	Then There Was Light, Volume 1	CTI	
1976	Romeo & Juliet	Columbia	
1976	Then There Was Light, Volume 2	CTI	
1978	Say It with Silence	Columbia	
1979	Land of Passion	Columbia	
1980	Family	Columbia	
1980	How to Beat the High Cost of Living	Columbia	With Earl Klugh
1982	Studio Trieste	CTI	With Chet Baker and Jim Hall
1983	Make It Last	Columbia	
1985	New Earth Sonata	Sony Music	
1993	My Time Will Come	Music Masters Jazz	
1994	Storm Then the Calm	Music Masters Jazz	
1998	Hubert Laws Remembers the Unforgettable Nat "King" Cole	RKO/Unique	
2002	Baila Cinderella	Scepterstein	
2004	Moondance	Savoy Jazz	
2005	Hubert Laws Plays Bach for Barone & Baker	Denon Records	
2006	Hubert Laws Live - 30-year Video Retrospective	Spirit Productions	
2009	Flute Adaptations of Rachmaninov & Barber	Spirit Productions	

== As sideman ==
With Roy Ayers

- Stoned Soul Picnic (Atlantic, 1968)
- Daddy Bug (Atlantic, 1969)

With Chet Baker

- She Was Too Good to Me (1972)
- You Can't Go Home Again (Horizon, 1977)
- The Best Thing for You (A&M, 1977 [1989])
- Studio Trieste (1982)

With George Benson

- Tell It Like It Is (A&M/CTI, 1969)
- The Other Side of Abbey Road (A&M/CTI, 1969)
- White Rabbit (CTI, 1972)
- Good King Bad (CTI, 1975)
- In Concert-Carnegie Hall (CTI, 1975)
- Pacific Fire (CTI, 1983)

With Ron Carter

- Uptown Conversation (Embryo, 1970)
- Blues Farm (CTI, 1973)
- Spanish Blue (CTI, 1974)
- Anything Goes (Kudu, 1975)
- New York Slick (Milestone, 1979)
- Empire Jazz (RSO, 1980)

With Chick Corea

- The Complete "Is" Sessions (1969)
- Tap Step (1980)
- The Ultimate Adventure (2006)

With Freddie Hubbard

- First Light (CTI, 1971)
- Sky Dive (CTI, 1972)

With Bobby Hutcherson

- Highway One (Columbia, 1978)
- Conception: The Gift of Love (Columbia, 1979)

With Jackie and Roy

- Time & Love (CTI, 1972)
- A Wilder Alias (CTI, 1973)

With Milt Jackson

- Milt Jackson and the Hip String Quartet (Verve, 1968)
- Goodbye (CTI, 1973)
- Feelings (Pablo, 1976)

With Quincy Jones

- Walking in Space (A&M, 1969)
- Gula Matari (A&M, 1970)
- Smackwater Jack (A&M, 1971)
- You've Got It Bad Girl (A&M, 1973)
- Body Heat (A&M, 1974)
- Mellow Madness (A&M, 1975)
- Sounds...and Stuff Like That!! (A&M, 1978)

With Gary McFarland

- America the Beautiful, An Account of its Disappearance (1968)
- Today (1969)

With Leon Spencer

- Bad Walking Woman (Prestige, 1972)
- Where I'm Coming From (Prestige, 1973)

With Stanley Turrentine

- Nightwings (Fantasy, 1977)
- If I Could (MusicMasters, 1993)

With McCoy Tyner

- Fly with the Wind (Milestone, 1976)
- Together (Milestone, 1978)
- La Leyenda de La Hora (Columbia, 1981)

With Walter Wanderley

- When It Was Done (A&M/CTI, 1968)
- Moondreams (A&M/CTI, 1969)

With others

- Claude Bolling, California Suite (CBS Masterworks, 1980)
- Kenny Burrell, God Bless the Child (CTI, 1971)
- Paul Desmond, From the Hot Afternoon (A&M/CTI, 1969)
- Charles Earland, Intensity (Prestige, 1972)
- Gil Evans, Blues in Orbit (Enja, 1971)
- Gil Scott-Heron, Pieces of a Man (Flying Dutchman, 1971)
- Astrud Gilberto, Gilberto with Turrentine with Stanley Turrentine (CTI, 1971)
- Grant Green, The Main Attraction (CTI, 1976)
- Johnny Hammond, The Prophet (Kudu, 1972)
- Eddie Henderson, Mahal (Capitol, 1978)
- Solomon Ilori, African High Life (Blue Note, 1964)
- The Jazz Crusaders, Chile Con Soul (Pacific Jazz, 1965)
- Harold Mabern, Greasy Kid Stuff! (Prestige, 1970)
- Junior Mance, I Believe to My Soul (Atlantic, 1968)
- Herbie Mann, Glory of Love (CTI, 1967)
- Arif Mardin, Journey (Atlantic, 1974)
- Helen Merrill and Dick Katz, A Shade of Difference (Milestone, 1968)
- James Moody, Great Day (Argo, 1963)
- Airto Moreira, Free (CTI, 1972)
- Alphonse Mouzon, Morning Sun (1981)
- Milton Nascimento, Courage (A&M/CTI, 1969)
- Jaco Pastorius, Jaco Pastorius (Epic, 1976)
- Houston Person, Broken Windows, Empty Hallways (Prestige, 1972)
- Dave Pike, Manhattan Latin (Decca, 1964)
- Joe Sample, Carmel (GRP, 1979)
- Mongo Santamaría, Mongomania (Columbia, 1967)
- Lalo Schifrin, Black Widow (CTI, 1976)
- Don Sebesky, Giant Box (CTI, 1973)
- Melvin Sparks, Akilah! (Prestige, 1972)
- Gábor Szabó, Mizrab (CTI, 1972)
- CTI All-Stars, California Concert (CTI, 1972)
- Bobby Timmons, Got to Get It! (Milestone, 1967)
- Cal Tjader, The Prophet (Verve, 1967)
- Randy Weston, Blue Moses (CTI, 1972)
- Gerald Wilson, Monterey Moods (Mack Avenue, 2007)
- Kai Winding, Penny Lane & Time (Verve, 1967)
- Stevie Wonder, A Time to Love (Motown, 2005)

== As a producer ==
With Debra Laws

- Very Special (Spy, 1981)

With Eloise Laws

- The Key (Scepterstein Records, 1999)

With Cheryl Lynn

- Got to Be Real: The Columbia Anthology (Soulmusic Records, 2019)
