= Rebellious Soul Tour =

2013 concert tour by K. Michelle

The Rebellious Soul Tour
- Tour by K. Michelle
- Location: United States
- Associated album: Rebellious Soul
- Start date: November 4, 2013
- End date: December 3, 2013
- Legs: 1
- No. of shows: 19

K. Michelle concert chronology
- The Rebellious Soul Tour (2013); My Twisted Mind Tour (2015)

The Rebellious Soul Tour was the first headlining concert tour by American singer K. Michelle, in support of her debut studio album, Rebellious Soul (2013). Presented by BET's Music Matters campaign, the 19-show tour began on November 4, 2013, in San Francisco, and concluded on December 3 in Boston.

== Background ==
Michelle announced the tour on October 4, 2013. Presented by BET Music Matters, the tour featured singer Sevyn Streeter as its special guest on all dates. Singer-songwriter Tiara Thomas was later added as an opening act during the tour.

== Critical response ==
Reviewing the November 5 performance at the House of Blues in West Hollywood, Gerrick D. Kennedy of the Los Angeles Times described Michelle's performance style as a "confessional, warts-and-all style" and wrote that she "moved through the hourlong set with the same conviction that packed the disk."

Writing for The Source about the November 17 performance at the Royal Oak Music Theatre in Michigan, Chuniq compared the concert experience to "group therapy."

== Setlist ==
The following songs were reported during the November 24, 2013, concert at The Fillmore Charlotte. The selection does not represent every performance on the tour.

1. "My Life"
2. "Who You're Around" (snippet; Meek Mill cover)
3. "Rain" (SWV cover)
4. "Before You Walk Out of My Life" (Monica cover)
5. "Amen"
6. "Go Off"
7. "Can't Raise a Man"
8. "The Right One"
9. "Pay My Bills"
10. "I Don't Like Me"
11. "Baby Mama"
12. "V.S.O.P."

== Opening acts ==
- Sevyn Streeter
- Tiara Thomas

== Tour dates ==
| Date | City | Country | Venue |
United States</ref>
| November 4, 2013 | San Francisco | United States | Mezzanine |
| November 5, 2013 | West Hollywood | United States | House of Blues |
| November 9, 2013 | Tempe | United States | Marquee Theatre |
| November 11, 2013 | Dallas | United States | House of Blues |
| November 12, 2013 | Houston | United States | Warehouse Live |
| November 14, 2013 | Kansas City | United States | Arvest Bank Theatre at the Midland |
| November 15, 2013 | Chicago | United States | The Shrine |
| November 16, 2013 | Indianapolis | United States | The Vogue |
| November 17, 2013 | Royal Oak | United States | Royal Oak Music Theatre |
| November 19, 2013 | Pittsburgh | United States | Carnegie Music Hall |
| November 21, 2013 | Raleigh | United States | Phantom Night Club |
| November 22, 2013 | Atlanta | United States | Center Stage |
| November 23, 2013 | North Myrtle Beach | United States | House of Blues |
| November 24, 2013 | Charlotte | United States | The Fillmore |
| November 26, 2013 | Baltimore | United States | Rams Head Live! |
| November 27, 2013 | Silver Spring | United States | The Fillmore Silver Spring |
| November 29, 2013 | Cleveland | United States | House of Blues |
| November 30, 2013 | Buffalo | United States | Tralf Music Hall |
| December 3, 2013 | Boston | United States | Wilbur Theatre |
