= Very Special =

Very Special may refer to:

- Very Special (Debra Laws album)
- Very Special (Junko Onishi album)
- Very Special (song), a 1981 song by Debra Laws
- "Very Special", a song by Chris Brown from his 2023 album 11:11
