= Grammy Award for Best R&B Performance by a Duo or Group with Vocals =

The Grammy Award for Best R&B Performance by a Duo or Group with Vocal was awarded between 1970 and 2011. From 1967 to 1969 and in 1971, the award included instrumental performances. The award had several minor name changes:

- From 1967 to 1968, the award was known as Best Rhythm & Blues Group Performance, Vocal or Instrumental
- In 1969, it was awarded as Best Rhythm & Blues Performance by a Duo or Group, Vocal or Instrumental
- In 1970, it was awarded as Best R&B Vocal Performance by a Duo or Group
- In 1971, it was awarded as Best R&B Performance by a Duo or Group, Vocal or Instrumental
- In 1972, it was awarded as Best R&B Vocal Performance by a Group
- From 1973 to 1980, it was awarded as Best R&B Vocal Performance by a Duo, Group or Chorus
- From 1981 to 2003, it was awarded as Best R&B Performance by a Duo or Group with Vocal
- In 2004, it was awarded as Best R&B Performance by a Duo or Group with Vocals

The award has been discontinued after 2011 in a major overhaul of Grammy categories. As of 2012, all solo and duo/group vocal performances in the R&B category were shifted to the newly formed Best R&B Performance category.

Years reflect the year in which the Grammy Awards were handed out, for music released in the previous year.

== Recipients ==
Year	Winner(s)	Title	Nominees	Ref.
1967	Ramsey Lewis	"Hold It Right There"	The Capitols for "Cool Jerk"; Sam & Dave for "Hold On, I'm A Comin'"; James & Bobby Purify for "I'm Your Puppet"; King Curtis for "Spanish Harlem"	
1968	Sam & Dave	"Soul Man"	Marvin Gaye and Tammi Terrell for "Ain't No Mountain High Enough"; Booker T. & the M.G.'s for "Hip Hug-Her"; Smokey Robinson & the Miracles for "I Second That Emotion"; Carla Thomas and Otis Redding for "King & Queen"	
1969	The Temptations	"Cloud Nine"	Sam & Dave for "I Thank You"; Peggy Scott and Jo Jo Benson for "Pickin' Wild Mountain Berries"; Sweet Inspirations for "Sweet Inspiration"; Archie Bell & the Drells for "Tighten Up"	
1970	The Isley Brothers	"It's Your Thing"	Mel and Tim for "Backfield In Motion"; The Winstons for "Color Him Father"; Gladys Knight & the Pips for "Friendship Train"; Peggy Scott and Jo Jo Benson for "Soulshake"	
1971	The Delfonics	"Didn't I (Blow Your Mind This Time)"	The Presidents for "5-10-15-20 (25-30 Years of Love)"; Charles Wright & the Watts 103rd Street Rhythm Band for "Express Yourself"; Four Tops for "It's All in the Game"; 100 Proof (Aged in Soul) for "Somebody's Been Sleeping in My Bed"	
1972	Ike & Tina Turner	"Proud Mary"	Gladys Knight & the Pips for "If I Were Your Woman"; The Staple Singers for "Respect Yourself"; Isaac Hayes for "Theme from Shaft"; Roberta Flack and Donny Hathaway for "You've Got a Friend"	
1973	The Temptations	"Papa Was a Rollin' Stone"	The Spinners for "I'll Be Around"; The Staple Singers for "I'll Take You There"; Harold Melvin & the Blue Notes for "If You Don't Know Me by Now"; Gladys Knight & the Pips for "Help Me Make It Through the Night"	
1974	Gladys Knight & the Pips	"Midnight Train to Georgia"	The Staple Singers for "Be What You Are"; The Spinners for "Could It Be I'm Falling in Love"; The O'Jays for "Love Train"; War for "Cisco Kid"	
1975	Rufus	"Tell Me Something Good"	The Jackson 5 for "Dancing Machine"; The O'Jays for "For the Love of Money"; Gladys Knight & the Pips for "I Feel a Song (In My Heart)"; The Spinners for "Mighty Love"	
1976	Earth, Wind & Fire	"Shining Star"	Average White Band for "Cut the Cake"; Ohio Players for "Fire"; KC and the Sunshine Band for "Get Down Tonight"; The Pointer Sisters for "How Long (Betcha' Got a Chick on the Side)"	
1977	Marilyn McCoo & Billy Davis Jr.	"You Don't Have to Be a Star (To Be in My Show)"	KC and the Sunshine Band for "(Shake, Shake, Shake) Shake Your Booty"; Earth, Wind & Fire for "Gratitude"; Wild Cherry for "Play That Funky Music"; The Spinners for "The Rubberband Man"	
1978	The Emotions	"Best of My Love"	Rufus ft. Chaka Khan for Ask Rufus; Gladys Knight & the Pips for "Baby, Don't Change Your Mind"; Heatwave for "Boogie Nights"; Commodores for "Easy"	
1979	Earth, Wind & Fire	All 'N All	A Taste of Honey for "Boogie Oogie Oogie"; Diana Ross and Michael Jackson for "Ease On down the Road"; Commodores for "Natural High"; The O'Jays for "Use ta Be My Girl"	
1980	Earth, Wind & Fire	"After the Love Has Gone"	McFadden & Whitehead for "Ain't No Stoppin' Us Now"; Commodores for "Midnight Magic"; Peaches & Herb for "Reunited"; Sister Sledge for "We Are Family"	
1981	The Manhattans	"Shining Star"	Gladys Knight & the Pips for "About Love"; Roberta Flack with Donny Hathaway for "Back Together Again"; The Spinners for "Cupid/I've Loved You for a Long Time"; Commodores for "Heroes"; The Jacksons for "Triumph"	
1982	Quincy Jones	The Dude	The Pointer Sisters for "Black and White"; Commodores for "Lady (You Bring Me Up)"; Earth, Wind & Fire for "Let's Groove"; Stanley Clarke, George Duke for "The Clarke/Duke Project"	
1983	Dazz Band	"Let It Whip"	Tavares for "A Penny for Your Thoughts"; The Crusaders with B.B. King, Josie James for "Street Life"; Paul McCartney, Stevie Wonder for "What's That You're Doing?"	
1983	Earth, Wind & Fire	"Wanna Be With You"	Tavares for "A Penny for Your Thoughts"; The Crusaders with B.B. King, Josie James for "Street Life"; Paul McCartney, Stevie Wonder for "What's That You're Doing?"	
1984	Rufus & Chaka Khan	"Ain't Nobody"	Shalamar for "Dead Giveaway"; Earth, Wind & Fire for "Fall in Love with Me"; DeBarge for "In a Special Way"; The Weather Girls for "It's Raining Men"	
1985	James Ingram & Michael McDonald	"Yah Mo B There"	Shalamar for "Dancing In the Sheets"; Kashif, Al Jarreau for "Edgartown Groove"; Jermaine Jackson, Michael Jackson for "Tell Me I'm Not Dreamin' (Too Good to Be True)"; Joyce Kennedy, Jeffrey Osborne for "The Last Time I Made Love"	
1986	Commodores	"Nightshift"	The Pointer Sisters for "Contact"; Eurythmics, Aretha Franklin for "Sisters Are Doin' It for Themselves"; Ashford & Simpson for "Solid"; Daryl Hall, John Oates, David Ruffin, Eddie Kendricks for "The Way You Do the Things You Do/My Girl"	
1987	Prince & the Revolution	"Kiss"	Sade for Promise; Run-D.M.C. for Raising Hell; Ashford & Simpson for Real Love; Chicago Bears Shufflin' Crew for "The Super Bowl Shuffle"; Cameo for "Word Up!"	
1988	Aretha Franklin & George Michael	"I Knew You Were Waiting (For Me)"	LeVert for "Casanova"; Club Nouveau for "Lean On Me"; The Whispers for "Rock Steady"; Prince and Sheena Easton for "U Got the Look"	
1989	Gladys Knight & the Pips	"Love Overboard"	Robert Cray for "Acting This Way"; Experience Unlimited for "Da Butt"; New Edition for "If It Isn't Love"; The Jets for "Rocket 2 U	
1990	Soul II Soul, & Caron Wheeler	"Back to Life (However Do You Want Me)"	Aretha Franklin & James Brown for "Gimme Your Love"; Aretha Franklin & Whitney Houston for "It Isn't, It Wasn't, It Ain't Never Gonna Be"; Deniece Williams & Natalie Cole for "We Sing Praises"; BeBe & CeCe Winans for "Celebrate New Life"	
1991	Ray Charles & Chaka Khan	"I'll Be Good to You"	After 7 for "Can't Stop"; Al B. Sure!, James Ingram, El DeBarge & Barry White for "The Secret Garden (Sweet Seduction Suite)"; En Vogue for Born to Sing; Was (Not Was) for "Papa Was a Rolling Stone"	
1992	Boyz II Men	Cooleyhighharmony	Color Me Badd for "I Wanna Sex You Up"; Aretha Franklin & Luther Vandross for "Doctor's Orders"; Gladys Knight, Patti LaBelle, & Dionne Warwick for "Superwoman"; Prince & the New Power Generation for "Gett Off"	
1993	Boyz II Men	"End of the Road"	Arrested Development for "People Everyday"; Mariah Carey & Trey Lorenz for "I'll Be There"; En Vogue for Funky Divas; Luther Vandross & Janet Jackson for "The Best Things in Life Are Free"	
1994	Sade	"No Ordinary Love"	Boyz II Men for "Let It Snow"; Earth, Wind & Fire for "Sunday Morning"; En Vogue for "Give It Up, Turn It Loose"; Tony! Toni! Toné! for "Anniversary"	
1995	Boyz II Men	"I'll Make Love to You"	Sade for "Please Send Me Someone to Love"; Salt-n-Pepa & En Vogue for "Whatta Man"; Take 6 for "Biggest Part of Me"; BeBe & CeCe Winans for "If Anything Ever Happened To You"	
1996	TLC	"Creep"	All-4-One for "I'm Your Man"; Brownstone for "If You Love Me"; Terence Trent D'Arby & Booker T. & the M.G.'s for "A Change Is Gonna Come"; Take 6 for "All I Need (Is A Chance)"	
1997	Fugees	"Killing Me Softly"	Luke Cresswell, Charlie Wilson, Fiona Wilkes, Carl Smith, Fraser Morrison, Everett Bradley, Yo-Yo, Chaka Khan, Luniz, & Shaquille O'Neal for "Stomp"; Babyface, Barry White, Portrait & Tamia for "Slow Jams"; En Vogue for "Don't Let Go (Love)"; Chaka Khan & Meshell Ndegeocello for "Never Miss the Water"	
1998	BLACKstreet	"No Diggity"	Az Yet & Peter Cetera for "Hard to Say I'm Sorry"; Boyz II Men for "A Song for Mama"; God's Property & Salt for "Stomp"; Take 6 for "You Don't Have to Be Afraid"	
1999	Brandy & Monica	"The Boy Is Mine"	Kirk Franklin ft. R. Kelly, Crystal Lewis, Mary J. Blige & Bono for "Lean On Me"; Lauryn Hill ft D'Angelo for "Nothing Even Matters"; K-Ci & JoJo for "All My Life"; The Temptations for "Stay"	
2000	TLC	"No Scrubs"	Destiny's Child for "Bills, Bills, Bills"; Mary J. Blige & Aretha Franklin for "Don't Waste Your Time"; Eric Benet & Tamia for "Spend My Life With You"; Whitney Houston, Faith Evans & Kelly Price for "Heartbreak Hotel"	
2001	Destiny's Child	"Say My Name"	Boyz II Men for "Pass You By"; Wyclef Jean & Mary J. Blige for "911"; Lucy Pearl for "Dance Tonight"; BeBe Winans, Joe & Brian McKnight for "Coming Back Home"	
2002	Destiny's Child	"Survivor"	City High for "What Would You Do?"; 112 for "Peaches & Cream"; The Isley Brothers for "Contagious"; Faith Evans & Carl Thomas for "Can't Believe"	
2003	Stevie Wonder and Take 6	"Love's in Need of Love Today" (Live)	TLC for "Girl Talk"; Angie Stone & Joe for "More Than a Woman"; Kenny G & Brian McKnight for "All the Way"; Nivea, Brian Casey & Brandon Casey for "Don't Mess with My Man"	
2004	Beyoncé & Luther Vandross	"The Closer I Get to You"	TLC for "Hands Up"; Roy Hargrove & D'Angelo for "I'll Stay"; The Isley Brothers & JS for "Busted"; Stanley Clarke ft. Amel Larrieux & Glenn Lewis for "Where Is the Love"	
2005	Usher and Alicia Keys	"My Boo"	Destiny's Child for "Lose My Breath"; Floetry for "Say Yes"; Alicia Keys ft. Tony! Toni! Toné! for "Diary"; Earth, Wind & Fire & Raphael Saadiq for "Show Me the Way"	
2006	Beyoncé & Stevie Wonder	"So Amazing"	Destiny's Child for "Cater 2 U"; Stevie Wonder & Aisha Morris for "How Will I Know"; Alicia Keys ft. Jermaine Paul for "If This World Were Mine"; John Legend & Lauryn Hill for "So High"	
2007	John Legend, Joss Stone & Van Hunt	"Family Affair"	George Benson & Al Jarreau for "Breezin'"; Jamie Foxx & Mary J. Blige for "Love Changes"; Chaka Khan, Carl Thomas, Yolanda Adams & Gerald Levert for "Family Reunion"; Prince & Támar for "Beautiful, Loved & Blessed"	
2008	Chaka Khan & Mary J. Blige	"Disrespectful"	R. Kelly & Usher for "Same Girl"; Rihanna & Ne-Yo for "Hate That I Love You"; Angie Stone & Betty Wright for "Baby"; T-Pain & Akon for "Bartender"	
2009	Al Green & John Legend	"Stay with Me (By the Sea)"	Boyz II Men for "Ribbon in the Sky"; Anthony David & India.Arie for "Words"; Jennifer Hudson & Fantasia Barrino for "I'm His Only Woman"; Raphael Saadiq, Stevie Wonder & CJ Hilton for "Never Give You Up"	
2010	Jamie Foxx & T-Pain	"Blame It"	India.Arie & Musiq Soulchild for "Chocolate High"; Musiq Soulchild & Mary J. Blige for "IfULeave"; Robert Randolph & The Clark Sisters for "Higher Ground"; Calvin Richardson & Ann Nesby for "Love Had Finally Come at Last"	
2011	Sade	"Soldier of Love"	Chuck Brown, Jill Scott & Marcus Miller for "Love"; Chris Brown & Tank for "Take My Time"; Ronald Isley & Aretha Franklin for "You've Got a Friend"; John Legend & The Roots for "Shine"	

== Category records ==
- Most wins

Rank	1st	2nd	3rd
Artist	Earth, Wind & Fire; Beyoncé	Chaka Khan; Boyz II Men	The Temptations; Rufus; Gladys Knight & the Pips; Destiny's Child; John Legend; TLC; Sade
Total Wins	4 wins	3 wins	2 wins

- Most Nominations

Rank	1st	2nd	3rd	4th	5th
Artist	Earth, Wind & Fire	Gladys Knight & the Pips	Chaka Khan; Boyz II Men; Beyoncé; Aretha Franklin	Mary J. Blige; The Commodores; Dawn Robinson	En Vogue; Stevie Wonder; Destiny's Child; Raphael Saadiq; The Spinners
Total Wins	9 nominations	8 nominations	7 nominations	6 nominations	5 nominations
