= Rebellious Soul =

Studio album by K. Michelle
- Released: August 13, 2013
- Recorded: 2012–2013
- Genres: R&B; soul
- Length: 44:35
- Label: Atlantic
- Producers: Alonzo Harris; Andrew "Hit Drew" Clifton; Pop & Oak; Bridgetown; David "Swagg R'Celious" Harris; Eric Hudson; Ezekiel Lewis; Happy Perez; Jack Splash; Nexx Generation; Tank; Troy Taylor; Stridah Von

K. Michelle chronology
| 0 Fucks Given (2012) | Rebellious Soul (2013) | Anybody Wanna Buy a Heart? (2014) |

Singles from Rebellious Soul
- 1. "V.S.O.P." Released: May 20, 2013; 2. "Can't Raise a Man" Released: December 12, 2013

Rebellious Soul is the debut studio album by American singer-songwriter K. Michelle. It was released on August 13, 2013, through Atlantic Records. The album's songs were primarily co-written and co-composed by K. Michelle and Bianca Atterberry. Additional collaborators included Tank, Priscilla Renea, Meek Mill, and Jack Splash.

Upon its release, the album debuted at number two on the Billboard 200 and reached number one on the Top R&B/Hip-Hop Albums, selling 72,000 copies in its first week. Rebellious Soul produced two singles: "V.S.O.P.", released on May 20, 2013, and "Can't Raise a Man", released on December 12, 2013. Michelle promoted the album through an album release party, televised performances, radio interviews, and the Rebellious Soul Tour.

The album was certified gold by the Recording Industry Association of America for sales of over 500,000 copies. At the 2013 Soul Train Music Awards, K. Michelle won the award for Best New Artist. Reviews for Rebellious Soul were generally positive, with critics praising its autobiographical themes and K. Michelle's vocal performance.

== Background ==
In 2008, K. Michelle signed a recording contract with Jive Records and began work on a debut album titled Pain Medicine. The unreleased project reportedly included collaborations with Trina, Gucci Mane, Akon, Usher, and R. Kelly. Following her departure from RCA Records in 2011, Michelle stated that creative differences and circumstances beyond her control contributed to the project's cancellation.

In 2012, K. Michelle joined the cast of the VH1 reality television series Love & Hip Hop: Atlanta which increased her public profile and led to a recording contract with Atlantic Records. She subsequently began work on her debut studio album.

In January 2013, K. Michelle announced that her debut album would be titled Rebellious Soul. On April 23, 2013, she released "I Just Wanna" as a buzz single to promote the album. The album cover artwork was unveiled on July 15, 2013. K. Michelle explained that the album title reflected her outspoken personality and willingness to express her beliefs without concern for criticism.

== Singles ==
"V.S.O.P." was released as the album's lead single on May 20, 2013. Produced by Pop & Oak, the song contains a sample of "Very Special" performed by Debra Laws, as well as "That's How Long" performed by The Chi-Lites. "V.S.O.P." reached at number 89 on the US Billboard Hot 100 and number 27 on the Billboard Hot R&B/Hip-Hop Songs charts. It was later certified gold by the Recording Industry Association of America. accompanying music video, directed by Benny Boom was released on June 29, 2013.

"Can't Raise a Man", was released as the album's second single on December 12, 2013. The song peaked at number 23 on the Hot R&B/Hip-Hop Songs and number 94 on the US Billboard Hot 100. It was later certified Platinum by the RIAA. Its accompanying music video, also directed by Benny Boom, was released on February 8, 2014.

== Critical response ==
Professional ratings
Aggregate scores
| Source | Rating |
|---|---|
| Metacritic | 71/100 |
Review scores
| Source | Rating |
| Allmusic | 4/5 stars |
| The Guardian | 4/5 stars |
| PopMatters | 5/10 stars |

Rebellious Soul received mostly positive reviews from critics. At Metacritic, which assigns a normalized rating out of 100 to reviews from mainstream critics, the album received an average score of 71, indicating "generally favorable reviews", based on five reviews. Andy Kellman of Allmusic raised the material influenced by classic soul, citing "Damn" and lead single "V.S.O.P." as key examples, and referring to it overall as a "compact, lyrically diverse debut."

Stacy-Ann Ellis of Vibe Stacy-Ann Ellis of Vibe noted K. Michelle's "rough around the edges" demeanor as evidenced in her role in Love & Hip Hop: Atlanta, but pointed out that the album shows more to her than just the "'shaking the table' moments, Piscean dramatics and a mouthful of expletives." She added that her "keep-it-real charm drew fans in, and her rebellious soul will keep them there."

Maura Johnston of MSN Music wrote, "Reality TV junkies might know this fiery singer from VH1′s ‘Love and Hip-Hop Atlanta,’ but she's been releasing real-talk-filled mixtapes for the past three years ... She shows off her super-raunchy, defiantly strong and maternally devoted sides, among others. All of these lyrics sound like they were written in moments of high passion, thanks in part to her take-no-prisoners voice."

Ayara Pommells of Soul Train said, "Overall Rebellious Soul is a great effort from K. Michelle. You can expect to be serenaded with tales of heartbreak, sexual encounters for grown folks and mantras of female empowerment. The production is complementary to both K. Michelle’s heavy vocals and candid lyrical content. She does not drown in the instrumentals. The beats are relatively simple without ever crossing over into vanilla territory. Every detail on this album has been carefully constructed so as to allow K. Michelle to shine her brightest."

Elias Legit of PopMatters was more critical, referencing the 2009 buzz single "Fakin' It" as a sign of her manipulation over men and inflating their egos, while lamenting that the same power was nowhere to be found on Rebellious Soul. Jon Caramancia of The New York Times praised K. Michelle's "tremendous promise", but was critical of her foul language and lack of boundaries in regard to subject matter, stating, "What she’s missing is restraint."

== Commercial performance ==
Rebellious Soul debuted at number two on the US Billboard 200 and number one on the Top R&B/Hip-Hop Albums selling 72,000 copies in its first week. On February 14, 2024, the album was certified RIAA for sales and album-equivalent units of 500,000 in the United States.

== Promotion ==
To promote Rebellious Soul, K. Michelle launched her first headlining tour, the Rebellious Soul Tour, presented by BET Music Matters. The 19-city run began on November 4, 2013, in San Francisco and concluded on December 3, 2013, in Boston. The tour included major stops in cities such as Los Angeles, Houston, Chicago, and Atlanta.

Opening acts on select dates included Sevyn Streeter and Tiara Thomas.

On December 20, 2013, during an appearance on BET’s 106 & Park, K. Michelle announced she would be joining Robin Thicke on the North American leg of his Blurred Lines Tour, which launched on February 21, 2014, in Atlanta, Georgia.

== Track listing ==
Rebellious Soul – Standard edition
| No. | Title | Writer(s) | Producer(s) | Length |
|---|---|---|---|---|
| 1. | "My Life" (includes "The Right One" interlude) | Kimberly Pate; Bianca Atterberry; Ervin Ward II; Dean Beresford; Durrell Babbs; Jerren Spruill; Troy Taylor | Nexx Generation; Spruill; Taylor | 5:03 |
| 2. | "Damn" | Pate; Atterberry; Eric Hudson; Andrew Clifton | Hudson; G-Eron^{[a]} | 3:18 |
| 3. | "I Don't Like Me" | Pate; Atterberry; James Alonzo Harris; David Harris | Harris; Harris | 2:51 |
| 4. | "Can't Raise a Man" | Taylor; Ezekiel Lewis; Menardini Timothee; Najja McDowell | Taylor; Lewis | 3:28 |
| 5. | "V.S.O.P." | Priscilla Renea; Andrew Wansel; Warren Felder; Lisa Peters; William Jeffrey; Walter Boyd; Elijah Powell | @PopWansel; @Oakwud | 3:29 |
| 6. | "Pay My Bills" | Pate; Atterberry; Nathan Perez; Frank McDonald; Chris Rae | Happy Perez | 3:21 |
| 7. | "Sometimes" | Pate; Atterberry; Jessyca Wilson; Jack Splash; Phillip Guilbeau | Splash | 6:16 |
| 8. | "Ride Out" (includes "Coochie Symphony" prelude) | Pate; Atterberry; Wilson; Felder; Barry White; Harris; Harris | Harris; Harris; @Oakwud | 3:56 |
| 9. | "Hate on Her" | Pate; Atterberry; Hudson; Clifton | Hudson; Clifton^{[a]} | 4:03 |
| 10. | "When I Get a Man" (includes "Rebuild This Heart" interlude) | Pate; Atterberry; Hudson; Clifton; Harris; Harris | Hudson; Clifton^{[a]} | 5:00 |
| 11. | "A Mother's Prayer" | Pate; Harris; Harris | Harris; Harris | 3:57 |
| Total length: | | | | 44:43 |

Deluxe edition (bonus tracks)
| No. | Title | Writer(s) | Producer(s) | Length |
|---|---|---|---|---|
| 12. | "Better Than Nothing" | Pate; Wilson; Lavar Wilson; Karsh Kale; Gaurav Reina; Wayne Sharpe; Khari Cain | Needlz; TL Cross^{[b]} |
| 13. | "The Right One" | Taylor; Spruill; Babbs | Taylor; Spruill |
| 14. | "Same Man" | Pate; Harris; Harris | Harris; Harris |

Notes

- ^{^[a]} signifies an additional producer
- ^{^[b]} signifies a co-producer

Sampling credits

- "V.S.O.P." samples elements of "Very Special", written by Lisa Peters and William Jeffrey, and That's How Long, written by Walter Boyd and Elijah Powell.
- "Pay My Bills" samples elements of "Night Moves", written by Frank McDonald and Chris Rae.
- "Sometimes" samples elements of "Sometimes", written by Phillip Guilbeau.
- "Ride Out" samples elements of "Somebody Is Gonna Off the Man", written by Barry White.
- "Better Than Nothing" samples elements of "Goa Dreams", written by Karsh Kale, Gaurav Reina and Wayne Sharpe.

== Charts ==
=== Weekly charts ===
Weekly chart performance for Rebellious Soul
| Chart (2013) | Peak position |
|---|---|
| US Billboard 200 | 2 |
| US Top R&B/Hip-Hop Albums (Billboard) | 1 |
| US Indie Store Album Sales (Billboard) | 6 |

=== Year-end charts ===
2013 year-end chart performance for Rebellious Soul
| Chart (2013) | Position |
|---|---|
| US Billboard 200 | 167 |
| US Top R&B/Hip-Hop Albums (Billboard) | 43 |

2014 year-end chart performance for Rebellious Soul
| Chart (2014) | Position |
|---|---|
| US Top R&B/Hip-Hop Albums (Billboard) | 44 |

== Certifications ==
| Region | Certification | Certified units/sales |
|---|---|---|
| United States (RIAA) | Gold | 500,000^{‡} |
^{‡} Sales+streaming figures based on certification alone.
