= Meant for You =

"Meant For You"

Single by Debra Laws

from the album Very Special
- Released: 1981
- Studio: Concorde Recording, Los Angeles
- Genre: R&B; soul
- Length: 3:59
- Label: Elektra
- Songwriter(s): David Lasley; Roxanne Seeman
- Producer(s): Hubert Laws; Ronnie Laws

Debra Laws singles chronology
"Be Yourself" (1981)	"Meant For You" (1981)

Music video
- "Meant for You" on YouTube

"Meant for You" is a song written by David Lasley and Roxanne Seeman and recorded by American singer Debra Laws. It was released in 1981 as the third single from Laws' Very Special album by Elektra Records. The song was produced by Hubert Laws and Ronnie Laws. “Meant For You” appears in the film Fighting Back starring Tom Skerritt, Patti LuPone and Michael Sarrazin.

The song was originally recorded by David Lasley as a 24-track demo during writer recording sessions at A&M Recording Studios while Lasley was under contract to Almo Music. Lasley's version was subsequently released on several compilation albums.

== Background ==
Roxanne Seeman gave Debra Laws “Meant For You” and “All The Things I Love”, both co-written with David Lasley, to try out. The demos were recorded with a full rhythm section and background vocals on a 24-track recorded at A&M Recording Studios.

"Meant For You" and “All The Things I Love” were re-recorded at Concord Recording Center, formerly Scott/Sunstorm and ABC Recording Studios before that, by engineer Gerry Brown. It was produced by Hubert Laws and Ronnie Laws, using a similar arrangement to the demos.

== Composition ==
Seeman developed the lyrical content for the song in a writing session with Lasley in his writer room at the Almo Publishing offices in Hollywood. Lasley then sat at the piano with the lyrics, where he put melody to the words and they developed it into a song.

Cashbox described “Meant for You” as a “Stevie Wonder-influenced groove” thematically “about love and dreams come true.” The song contains chorus vocals, rhythm guitar and strings.

== Personnel ==
David Lasley version

- David Lasley – lead vocals, background vocals, producer, arranger
- Roxanne Seeman – composer
- David Benoit – keyboards, producer
- Bobby Ray Watson – bass
- Marty Walsh – guitar
- Gary Ferguson – drums

Debra Laws version

- Debra Laws – vocals
- Hubert Laws – producer
- Ronnie Laws – producer
- Nathan East – bass
- Bobby Lyle – piano
- Roland Bautista – guitar
- Leon "Ndugu" Chancler – drums
- David Lasley – background vocals
- Arnold McCuller – background vocals
- Marlena Jeter – background vocals
- Gwen Gwenchee Mathews – background vocals
- Gerry Brown – engineer

== Chart performance ==
"Meant For You" peaked at 47 on the Billboard US R&B chart, Hot Soul Singles, staying on the chart for 9 weeks. The accompanying Very Special album sold more than 385,000 copies worldwide.

Chart	Peak position
United States Billboard R&B	47
United States Record World Black Oriented Singles	36
United States Record World Singles	126

== Critical reception ==
“Meant For You” was a recommended pick in Billboard's R&B single reviews in the September 5, 1981 issue.

A review in Cashbox praised Laws’ “pristine vocals” over a groove with “tasty lick rhythm guitar” complemented by “swooning strings” while commending the production by her brothers Hubert and Ronnie for bringing out “her best chops”.

Record World described the song as having a “bouncy” feel with a “neat hook” and “sweet chorus backing”, calling Laws’ vocal “vibrant.”

John Hoskins of The Grand Rapids Press called the song “mellow” and said it “stands out” on the album.

== Track listing ==
A. Meant For You – 3:59

B. How Long – 4:02

== Film ==
“Meant For You” appears in the 1982 film Fighting Back, directed by Lewis Teague, starring Tom Skerritt, Patti LuPone and Michael Sarrazin.

== Compilations and other versions ==
"Meant For You" was included in a 2005 Warner Special Marketing CD compilation, Natural High 4, of soul songs from the vaults of Atlantic Records, Elektra Records and Warner Bros. Records from 1975 – 1983. Tracks included featured Ben E. King, Aretha Franklin, Staple (band), Chaka Khan, The Meters, Michael Franks (musician), Sérgio Mendes & Brasil '77, and others.

Hal Leonard Corporation printed the single sheet piano music.

The song was released on several compilation albums featuring David Lasley as the artist:

- "Expectations of Love", Expansion Records (2001)
- "Demos" (2003)
- "Now And Again", Noa Noa Music (2006).
