= V.S.O.P. (song) =

Single by K. Michelle

from the album Rebellious Soul
- Released: May 20, 2013
- Recorded: 2012
- Genre: Soul; R&B
- Length: 3:28
- Label: Atlantic
- Songwriters: Priscilla Hamilton; Warren Felder; Andrew Wansel; Lisa Peters; William Jeffrey; Walter Boyd; Elijah Powell
- Producer: Pop & Oak

K. Michelle singles chronology
"I Just Wanna" (2013)	"V.S.O.P." (2013)	"Can't Raise a Man" (2013)

"V.S.O.P." is the debut commercial single by American singer K. Michelle. It was released on May 20, 2013 as the lead single from Michelle's debut studio album Rebellious Soul (2013). Written by Muni Long (then known as Priscilla Renea),Warren Felder, Andrew Wansel, Lisa Peters, William Jeffrey, Walter Boyd, and Elijah Powell, the song also features background vocals from American singer Kelly Rowland as well as Muni Long who co-wrote the song. The song samples "Very Special" by Debra Laws as well as "That's How Long" by the Chi-Lites.

Lyrically, the song speaks of a special relationship between K. Michelle and her love interest, but parallels the relationship with drinking V.S.O.P. Brandy. The song peaked at number 89 on the US Billboard Hot 100 Singles chart and at number 27 on the Hot R&B/Hip-Hop Songs chart. The official remix features American rapper Young Jeezy while other remix versions feature Rick Ross, Jadakiss and August Alsina respectively.

== Critical reception ==
The song received a generally positive review from music critic Andy Kellman of AllMusic. He described the song as being part of "the best material" on the album.

== Music video ==
The music video for the song was released on June 29, 2013 on the BET show 106 & Park and was directed by Benny Boom. It chronicles a troubled relationship between K. Michelle and her lover. The love interest in the video is played by former teen rapper Chi-Ali.

== Charts ==
=== Weekly charts ===
Chart (2013)	Peak position
US Billboard Hot 100	89
US Hot R&B/Hip-Hop Songs (Billboard)	27

=== Year-end charts ===
Chart (2013)	Position
US Hot R&B/Hip-Hop Songs (Billboard)	93

== Certifications ==
Region	Certification	Certified units/sales
United States (RIAA)	Gold	500,000^{‡}
^{‡} Sales+streaming figures based on certification alone.
