= Land of Passion =

Studio album by Hubert Laws
- Released: 1979
- Genre: Jazz
- Label: Columbia
- Producer: Hubert Laws

Hubert Laws chronology
Say It with Silence (1978)	Land of Passion (1979)	Family (1980)

Land of Passion is an album by American flutist Hubert Laws released in 1979 via Columbia Records and produced by Laws himself. The album peaked at No. 8 on the US Billboard Top Jazz LPs chart.

== Guest artists ==
Guest artists on the album include Patrice Rushen, Debra Laws, Ronnie Laws, Eloise Laws as well as Larry Dunn and Roland Bautista of Earth, Wind and Fire.

== Critical reception ==
Professional ratings
Review scores
Source	Rating
AllMusic	2.5/5 stars

Alex Henderson of AllMusic, in a 2.5/5-star review, remarked, "Land of Passion isn't instrumental jazz — it isn't hard bop, post-bop, or even fusion. The main focus of this LP is mellow, mildly jazzy R&B/pop (with the occasional instrumental)...Land of Passion needs to be judged by R&B/pop and quiet storm standards, and when those standards are applied, one has to say that this record is likable but not mind-blowing."

== Tracklisting ==
No.	Title	Writer(s)	Length
1.	"Music Forever"	Hubert Laws	5:13
2.	"Land of Passion"	Hubert Laws	5:45
3.	"We're In Ecstacy"	Hubert Laws	7:07
4.	"Heartbeats"	Hubert Laws	6:34
5.	"The Key"	Hubert Laws	6:55
6.	"We Will Be"	Ronnie Laws	4:36

== Credits ==
- Bass Guitar – Bobby Vega, James Jamerson
- Brass – Bobby Bryant, Oscar Brashear, Raymond Brown, Snooky Young
- Cello – Nils Oliver, Raymond Kelly, Ron Cooper
- Co-producer [Assistant] – William Jeffrey
- Design – Nancy Donald
- Drums – Ndugu Chancler, Raymond Pounds
- Engineer (Recording) – Chris Brunt
- Engineer (String & Brass) – Buddy Brundo
- Flute, Alto Flute – Hubert Laws
- Rhythm Guitar – Melvin Robinson, Pat Kelley, Roland Bautista
- Mastered By (Mastering Engineer) – Vlado Meller
- Percussion – Victor Feldman
- Piano – Barnaby Finch, Patrice Rushen
- Producer – Hubert Laws
- Saxophone, Synthesizer (Moog), Co-producer (Assistant) – Ronnie Laws
- Strings – Arnold Belnick, Bonnie Douglas, Dorothy Wade, Endre Granat, Janice Dower, Marcia Van Dyke, Paul Shure, Robert Sushel, Sandy Seymour
- Synthesizer – Larry Dunn
- Trombone – Benny Powell, Garnett Brown, Maurice Spears
- Vocals – Blanch Laws, Debra Laws, Eloise Laws, Johnny Laws
