= Crying Song (album) =

Studio album by Hubert Laws
- Released: 1969
- Recorded: July 23–24 (#1, 2, 4–6, 9); American Sound Studios, Memphis; September 23–24, 1969 (#3, 7–8); Van Gelder Studio, Englewood Cliffs
- Genre: Jazz
- Length: 33:42
- Label: CTI; CTI 1002/CTI 6000
- Producer: Creed Taylor

Hubert Laws chronology
Laws' Cause (1968)	Crying Song (1969)	Afro-Classic (1970)

CTI 1000 Series cover
- CTI 1002 LP

Crying Song is an album by jazz flautist Hubert Laws released on the CTI label featuring performances of popular music (including songs by Pink Floyd, The Beatles, The Monkees and The Bee Gees) and by Laws recorded in Memphis with Elvis Presley's rhythm section and at Rudy Van Gelder's studio.

== Reception ==
The Allmusic review awarded the album 3 stars.

Professional ratings
Review scores
Source	Rating
Allmusic	3/5 stars

== Track listing ==
1. "La Jean" (Johnny Christopher) – 2:33
2. "Love Is Blue/Sing a Rainbow" (André Popp/Arthur Hamilton) – 3:25
3. "Crying Song" (Roger Waters) – 4:56
4. "Listen to the Band" (Michael Nesmith) – 3:24
5. "I've Gotta Get a Message to You" (Barry Gibb, Robin Gibb, Maurice Gibb) – 3:12
6. "Feelin' Alright" (Dave Mason) – 2:34
7. "Cymbaline" (Waters) – 3:55
8. "How Long Will It Be?" (Hubert Laws) – 6:11
9. "Let It Be" (John Lennon, Paul McCartney) – 3:32

== Personnel ==
- Hubert Laws – flute
- Bobby Wood – piano (tracks 1, 2, 4–6 & 9)
- Bobby Emmons – organ (tracks 1, 2, 4–6 & 9)
- Bob James – electric piano, organ (tracks 3, 7 & 8)
- George Benson (tracks 3, 7 & 8), Reggie Young (tracks 1, 2, 4–6 & 9) – guitar
- Mike Leech – electric bass (tracks 1, 2, 4–6 & 9)
- Ron Carter – bass (tracks 3, 7 & 8)
- Gene Chrisman (tracks 1, 2, 4–6 & 9), Billy Cobham (track 3), Grady Tate (tracks 7 & 8) – drums
- Ernie Royal, Marvin Stamm – trumpet, flugelhorn (tracks 1, 2, 4–6 & 9)
- Garnett Brown, Tony Studd – trombone (tracks 1, 2, 4–6 & 9)
- Art Clarke, Seldon Powell – saxophone (tracks 1, 2, 4–6 & 9)
- Ed Shaughnessy – tabla, sand blocks (track 6)
- Lewis Eley, Paul Gershman, George Ockner, Gene Orloff, Raoul Pollikoff, Matthew Raimondi, Sylvan Shulman, Avram Weiss – violin (tracks 1 & 2)
- Charles McCracken, George Ricci – cello (tracks 1 & 2)
- Bob James, Glen Spreen, Mike Leech – arranger
