= Flute By-Laws =

Studio album by Hubert Laws
- Released: 1966
- Recorded: Aug 25, 1965 – Feb 22, 1966
- Genre: Jazz
- Label: Atlantic
- Producer: Joel Dorn

Hubert Laws chronology
The Laws of Jazz (1964)	Flute By-Laws (1966)	Laws' Cause (1968)

Professional ratings
Review scores
Source	Rating
Allmusic	4/5 stars

Flute By-Laws is the second album by jazz flautist Hubert Laws, released in 1966 on Atlantic Records.

== Track listing ==
All tracks composed by Hubert Laws

1. "Bloodshot"
2. "Miedo"
3. "Mean Lene"
4. "No You'd Better Not"
5. "Let Her Go"
6. "Strange Girl"
7. "Baila Cinderella"

== Personnel ==
- Hubert Laws - Flute (tracks 1–4,6), Piccolo (tracks 5,7)
- Marty Banks - Trumpet, Flugelhorn
- Jimmy Owens - Trumpet, Flugelhorn
- Garnett Brown - Trombone (tracks 2,5–7)
- Carmelo Garcia - Timbales (tracks 1,3,5–7)
- Benny Powell - Trombone, Bass Trombone (tracks 1,3,4)
- Chris White - Bass (tracks 1,3,4)
- Ray Lucas - Drums (tracks 1,3,4)
- Victor Pantoja - Conga (tracks 1,3,4)
- Rodgers Grant - Piano (tracks 1,4)
- Chick Corea - Piano (tracks 2,3,5–7)
- Tom McIntosh - Trombone (tracks 2,5–7)
- Bobby Thomas - Drums (tracks 2,5–7)
- Richard Davis - Bass (tracks 2,6)
- Cachao López - bass (tracks 5,7)
- Raymond Orchart - Conga (tracks 5,7)
- Bill Fitch - Percussion (tracks 5,7)
- Sam Brown - Guitar (track 6)
