= Can't Raise a Man =

Single by K. Michelle

from the album Rebellious Soul
- Released: December 12, 2013
- Genre: R&B; soul
- Length: 3:28
- Label: Atlantic
- Songwriters: Kimberly Pate, Troy Taylor, Ezekiel Lewis, Menardini Timothee, Najja McDowell
- Producers: Bridgetown, Troy Taylor, Ezekiel Lewis

K. Michelle singles chronology
| "V.S.O.P." (2013) | "Can't Raise a Man" (2013) | "Love 'Em All" (2014) |

"Can't Raise a Man" is a song by American R&B singer K. Michelle released on December 12, 2013. It is the second single from her debut studio album Rebellious Soul. Produced by Bridgetown, Troy Taylor, and Ezekiel Lewis, and written by Taylor, Lewis, Menardini Timothee, and Najja McDowell.

== Chart performance ==
On February 14, 2014, the song peaked at number 94 on the US Billboard Hot 100 chart, number 23 on the Hot R&B/Hip-Hop Songs chart, number 12 on the Heatseekers Songs chart and number 19 on the R&B Streaming Songs.

On April 5, 2014, the song peaked at number 30 on the US Billboard Adult R&B Songs chart and number 13 on US Billboard Hot R&B Songs. On April 19, 2014, the song peaked at number 13 on US Billboard R&B/Hip-Hop Airplay,

== Music video ==
The music video for the song was released on February 7, 2014, via YouTube and was directed by Benny Boom. It was shot at Great Falls (Passaic River) in Paterson, New Jersey.

== Charts ==
=== Weekly charts ===
| Chart (2014) | Peak position |
|---|---|
| US Billboard Hot 100 | 94 |
| US Hot R&B/Hip-Hop Songs (Billboard) | 23 |
| US Adult R&B Songs (Billboard) | 30 |

=== Year-end charts ===
| Chart (2014) | Position |
|---|---|
| US Hot R&B/Hip-Hop Songs (Billboard) | 81 |

== Certifications ==
| Region | Certification | Certified units/sales |
|---|---|---|
| United States (RIAA) | Platinum | 1,000,000^{‡} |
^{‡} Sales+streaming figures based on certification alone.
