= Morning Star (Hubert Laws album) =

Studio album by Hubert Laws
- Released: 20 December 1972
- Recorded: September – November 1972
- Studio: Van Gelder Studio, Englewood Cliffs, NJ
- Genre: Jazz
- Length: 35:46
- Label: CTI
- Producer: Creed Taylor

Hubert Laws chronology
Wild Flower (1972)	Morning Star (1972)	Carnegie Hall (1973)

Morning Star is an album by flautist Hubert Laws released on the CTI and recorded at Rudy Van Gelder's studio in 1972.

== Reception ==
The Allmusic review by Thom Jurek awarded the album 4 stars stating "Morning Star is a joy all the way through... It's Laws at his very best; it helped define the essence of CTI".

Professional ratings
Review scores
Source	Rating
Allmusic	4/5 stars

== Track listing ==
All compositions by Hubert Laws except where noted

1. "Morning Star" (Rodgers Grant) - 7:57
2. "Let Her Go" - 4:53
3. "Where Is The Love" (Ralph MacDonald, William Salter) - 4:36
4. "No More" - 5:01
5. "Amazing Grace" (Traditional) - 7:19
6. "What Do You Think of This World Now?" - 6:00

== Personnel ==
- Hubert Laws - flute, alto flute, bass flute, piccolo
- Alan Rubin, Marvin Stamm - trumpet, flugelhorn
- Garnett Brown - trombone
- James Buffington - French horn
- Phil Bodner - clarinet, flute, alto flute
- Romeo Penque - flute, alto flute, bass flute, piccolo, English horn
- Jack Knitzer - bassoon
- Bob James - electric piano
- John Tropea - guitar
- Ron Carter - bass
- Billy Cobham - drums
- Dave Friedman - vibraphone, percussion
- Ralph MacDonald - percussion
- Harry Cykman, Max Ellen, Paul Gershman, Emanuel Green, Harry Lookofsky, David Nadien, Gene Orloff, Elliot Rosoff, Irving Spice - violin
- George Koutzen, Charles McCracken, Lucien Schmit - cello
- Gloria Agostini - harp
- Lani Groves, Eloise Laws, Debra Laws, Tasha Thomas - vocal
- Don Sebesky - arranger, conductor
