= In the Beginning (Hubert Laws album) =

Studio album by Hubert Laws
- Released: 1974
- Recorded: February 6–8 and 11, 1974
- Studio: Van Gelder Studio, Englewood Cliffs, NJ
- Genre: Jazz
- Length: 63:12
- Label: CTI
- Producer: Creed Taylor

Hubert Laws chronology
Carnegie Hall (1973)	In the Beginning (1974)	The Chicago Theme (1975)

Then There Was Light Vol 2 cover

In the Beginning is a double album by flutist Hubert Laws released on the CTI and recorded at Rudy Van Gelder's studio in 1974. The album was later reissued on CTI as two separate volumes entitled Then There Was Light.

== Reception ==
Viewed, at the time of its release, as a "Recording of Special Merit" in the estimation of Stereo Review (which, in addition, proclaimed the "recording excellent," the "performance impeccable," and the resulting album a welcome return to Laws' pre-CTI form), In the Beginning would provoke a similarly enthusiastic response decades later from Allmusic's Scott Yanow, who awarded the album 5 stars, stating "This double album features flutist Hubert Laws at his finest. The music ranges from classical-oriented pieces to straight-ahead jazz with touches of '70s funk included in the mix... this recording is one of the most rewarding of Hubert Laws' career". The Penguin Guide to Jazz Recordings describes it as Laws’s “best album and a good, expansive representation of his flute playing.”

Professional ratings
Review scores
Source	Rating
Allmusic	5/5 stars
Stereo Review	"Recording of Special Merit"
The Penguin Guide to Jazz Recordings	3.5/4 stars

== Track listing ==
1. "In the Beginning" (Clare Fischer) - 6:53
2. "Restoration" (Harold Blanchard) - 8:59
3. "Gymnopédie No. 1" (Erik Satie) - 3:55
4. "Come Ye Disconsolate" (Traditional) - 5:21
5. "Airegin" (Sonny Rollins) - 5:32
6. "Moment's Notice" (John Coltrane) - 6:56
7. "Reconciliation" (Rodgers Grant) - 10:08
8. "Mean Lene" (Hubert Laws) - 15:28
- Recorded at Van Gelder Studio in Englewood Cliffs, New Jersey on February 6–8 and 11, 1974

== Personnel ==
- Hubert Laws - flute, arranger
- Ronnie Laws - tenor saxophone
- Bob James - keyboards, arranger, conductor
- Clare Fischer - piano, electric piano
- Richard Tee - organ
- Gene Bertoncini - guitar
- Ron Carter - bass
- Steve Gadd - drums
- Dave Friedman - vibraphone
- Airto Moreira - percussion
- David Nadien - violin
- Emanuel Vardi - viola
- George Ricci - cello
