= Afro-Classic =

Studio album by Hubert Laws
- Released: 1970
- Recorded: December 1 & 11, 1970
- Studio: Van Gelder Studio, Englewood Cliffs, NJ
- Genre: Jazz, third stream
- Length: 37:29
- Label: CTI
- Producer: Creed Taylor

Hubert Laws chronology
| Crying Song (1969) | Afro-Classic (1970) | The Rite of Spring (1971) |

Afro-Classic is an album by flautist Hubert Laws released on the CTI label featuring performances of popular and classical music by Laws recorded at Rudy Van Gelder's studio in 1970.

== Reception ==
The AllMusic review by Thom Jurek awarded the album 5 stars stating "Afro-Classic is a classic for the manner in which Laws, with brilliant assistance from arranger Don Sebesky, melded the jazz and classical worlds — not to mention pop — into a seamless whole," aptly describing "[t]he liberties taken with the Passacaglia" as "revolutionary" rendering the "stunning" number "no longer simply a classical tune" but one which "begins to swing with Latin, blues, and jazz undertones. When Laws finally takes his solo, the tune simply grooves its way through to the end — with subtle sound effects that Brian Eno would be envious of because he hadn't thought of them yet."

Professional ratings
Review scores
| Source | Rating |
|---|---|
| Allmusic | 5/5 stars |
| The Penguin Guide to Jazz Recordings | 3/4 stars |

== Track listing ==
1. "Fire and Rain" (James Taylor) - 7:58
2. "Allegro from Concerto No. 3 in D" (Johann Sebastian Bach) - 3:47
3. "Theme from Love Story" (Francis Lai) - 7:32
4. "Passacaglia in C Minor" (Johann Sebastian Bach) - 15:14
5. "Flute Sonata in F" (Wolfgang Amadeus Mozart) - 3:17

== Personnel ==
- Hubert Laws - flute (on "Passacaglia", electric flute)
- Bob James - electric piano
- Gene Bertoncini - guitar
- Ron Carter - bass (on "Passacaglia", electric cello solo)
- Fred Waits - drums
- Dave Friedman - vibraphone (on "Fire and Rain", vibes with fuzz pedal)
- Richie "Pablo" Landrum, Airto Moreira - percussion
- Fred Alston, Jr. - bassoon
- Don Sebesky - arranger
