= My Time Will Come =

Studio album by Hubert Laws
- Released: 1993
- Genre: Jazz
- Label: Music Masters
- Producer: Hubert Laws

Hubert Laws chronology
New Earth Sonata (1985)	My Time Will Come (1993)	Storm Then the Calm (1994)

My Time Will Come is an album by American flutist Hubert Laws released in 1993 via Music Masters Records, produced by Laws himself. That album peaked at No. 15 on the US Billboard Best Selling Jazz LPs chart.

== Guest performers ==
Guest artists on the album include George Duke, Joe Sample and Ronnie Laws.

== Critical reception ==
Professional ratings
Review scores
Source	Rating
AllMusic	2/5 stars

Scott Yanow of AllMusic, in a 2/5-star review, declared, "This is a streaky affair, Hubert Laws's first recording as a leader in quite a few years...only Hubert Laws's most loyal fans will want this release."

== Tracklisting ==
No.	Title	Writer(s)	Length
1.	"La Malagueña"	Ernesto Lecuona	10:06
2.	"My Time Will Come"	Hubert Laws	5:12
3.	"It's So Crazy"	William Jeffrey, Hubert Laws	4:57
4.	"Shades of Light"	Hubert Laws	6:59
5.	"Valse"	Frédéric Chopin	10:51
6.	"Make It Last"	Hubert Laws	8:40
7.	"Moonlight Sonata"	Ludwig van Beethoven	7:53

== Credits ==
- Chris Brunt - engineer
- Clayton Cameron - drums
- Danny Gottlieb - drums
- Don Sebesky - arranger
- Gary Willis - bass
- George Duke - keyboards
- Hubert Laws - arranger, engineer, flute, piccolo, producer
- Joan La Barbara - bass, brass, vocals
- Joe Sample - keyboards
- John Beasley - keyboards
- John Patitucci - bass
- Leon Johnson - engineer
- Mark Gray - piano
- Mike Richmond - bass
- Ralph Penland - drums
- Ronnie Laws - soprano sax
- Rudy Van Gelder - engineer
- Skyash 7 - bass, percussion, strings
- Sue Evans - percussion
- Terral "Terry" Santiel - congas, percussion, strings
- Terry Santell - congas, percussion
