= Romeo & Juliet (Hubert Laws album) =

Studio album by Hubert Laws
- Released: 1976
- Studio: Mediasound Studios, New York City
- Genre: Jazz
- Length: 36:39
- Label: Columbia Records
- Producer: Bob James, Bob Clearmountain

Hubert Laws chronology
Then There Was Light, Volume 1 (1976)	Romeo & Juliet (1976)	Then There Was Light, Volume 2 (1976)

Romeo & Juliet is an album by flutist Hubert Laws. It was released by Columbia Records and spent several weeks on the Billboard Top LPs & Tape chart in 1976.

The album is "an adaptation of Tchaikovsky's famous theme with strings and electronic instruments, in a pop vein." The AllMusic reviewer described the album as "Light jazz (with strings, keyboards, voices, etc.) and a classical/Eastern flavor."

== Track listing ==
1. "Undecided" - 6:07
2. "Tryin' to Get the Feeling Again" - 8:07
3. "Forlane" - 4:11
4. "Romeo & Juliet" - 7:41
5. "What Are We Gonna Do?" - 5:30
6. "Guatemala Connection" - 5:43

== Personnel ==
- Hubert Laws - Flute
- Bob James - Fender Rhodes, Clavinet, Keyboards
- Eric Gale, Richie Resnicoff, Barry Finnerty, Steve Khan - Guitar
- Gary King - Bass
- Andy Newmark, Steve Gadd - Drums
- Ralph MacDonald - Percussion
- Mark Gray - Clavinet, Keyboards
- Alan Rubin, Randy Brecker, Jon Faddis, Marvin Stamm, Bernie Glow - Trumpet, Flugelhorn
- Allen Ralph, David Taylor, Wayne Andre - Trombone
- George Marge, David Sanborn, Howard Johnson, Phil Bodner, Jerry Dodgion, Harvey Estrin - Woodwinds
- David Nadien - Concertmaster
- Alan Schulman, Alfred Brown, Barry Sinclair, Charles McCracken, Emanuel Green, Emanuel Vardi, Guy Lumia, Harold Kohon, Harry Cykman, Harry Lookofsky, Matthew Raimondi, Max Ellen, Max Pollikoff, Paul Gershman, Seymour Barab - Strings
- Denise Wigfall, Kenneth Coles, Robin Wilson, Shirley Thompson, Stanley Stroman - Vocals

=== Production ===
- Produced, Arranged and Conducted by Bob James
- Co-Produced and Engineered by Bob Clearmountain
- Engineered by Joe Jorgensen
- Vocal Arrangements by Stanley Stroman
