= The Chicago Theme =

Studio album by Hubert Laws
- Released: 1975
- Recorded: January–April 1975
- Studio: Van Gelder, Englewood Cliffs, New Jersey
- Genre: Jazz
- Length: 34:49
- Label: CTI
- Producer: Creed Taylor

Hubert Laws chronology
In the Beginning (1974)	The Chicago Theme (1975)	The San Francisco Concert (1977)

The Chicago Theme is an album by flautist Hubert Laws recorded at Rudy Van Gelder's Studio in New Jersey in 1974 and released in 1975 on the CTI label.

== Reception ==
The Allmusic review by Scott Yanow awarded the album 3 stars stating "Rather than performing with a small group, as he did on his best sessions, Laws is joined by strings and funky rhythm sections playing now-dated commercial grooves... The only reason to acquire this out of print LP is for Laws' still-superb flute playing".

Professional ratings
Review scores
Source	Rating
Allmusic	3/5 stars

== Track listing ==
All compositions by Hubert Laws except as indicated

1. "The Chicago Theme (Love Loop)" (Bob James) - 5:38
2. "Midnight at the Oasis" (David Nichtern) - 5:31
3. "You Make Me Feel Brand New" (Thom Bell, Linda Creed) - 5:54
4. "Going Home" (Antonín Dvořák) - 4:56
5. "I Had a Dream" - 6:02
6. "Inflation Chaser" - 6:48

- Recorded at Van Gelder Studio in Englewood Cliffs, New Jersey between January and April, 1975

== Personnel ==
- Hubert Laws - flute, arranger
- Randy Brecker - trumpet
- Michael Brecker - tenor saxophone
- David Sanborn - alto saxophone
- Bob James - keyboards, arranger, conductor
- Don Grolnick - piano, clavinet
- Joe Beck, George Benson, Eric Gale, Richie Resnicoff, Phil Upchurch - guitar
- Doug Bascomb, Ron Carter - bass
- Stanley Clarke - electric bass
- Steve Gadd, Andrew Smith - drums
- Ralph MacDonald - percussion
- Harry Cykman, Gayle Dixon, Max Ellen, Paul Gershman, Emanuel Green, Harold Kohon, Charles Libove, Harry Lookofsky, David Nadien, Matthew Raimondi - violin
- Al Brown, Manny Vardi - viola
- George Ricci, Alan Shulman - cello
