= Carnegie Hall (Hubert Laws album) =

Live album by Hubert Laws
- Released: 1973
- Recorded: January 12, 1973
- Genre: Jazz
- Length: 36:12
- Label: CTI
- Producer: Creed Taylor

Hubert Laws chronology
Morning Star (1972)	Carnegie Hall (1973)	In the Beginning (1974)

Carnegie Hall is a live album by flautist Hubert Laws recorded at Carnegie Hall in New York City in 1973 and released on the CTI label.

== Reception ==
Professional ratings
Review scores
Source	Rating
AllMusic	4/5 stars

The AllMusic review by Scott Yanow awarded the album 4 stars stating "This interesting live set features flutist Hubert Laws at the height of his powers and fame".

== Track listing ==
1. "Windows/Fire and Rain" (Chick Corea/James Taylor) - 15:30
2. "Passacaglia in C Minor" (Johann Sebastian Bach) - 20:42

Recorded at Carnegie Hall in New York City on January 12, 1973

== Personnel ==
- Hubert Laws - flute
- Bob James - electric piano
- Gene Bertoncini - guitar
- Ron Carter - bass
- Billy Cobham, Freddie Waits - drums
- Dave Friedman - vibraphone
- Don Sebesky - arranger
- Dave Miller - bassoon
