= Very Special (song) =

1981 single by Debra Laws

Single by Debra Laws

from the album Very Special
- B-side: "All the Things I Love"
- Released: August 1981
- Recorded: 1981
- Genre: R&B; soul
- Length: 4:29
- Label: Elektra
- Songwriters: Lisa Peters; William Jeffrey
- Producers: Hubert Laws; Ronnie Laws

Debra Laws singles chronology
"Very Special" (1981)	"Be Yourself" (1981)

"Very Special" is a song by American singer and actress Debra Laws. Released as a single in 1981, it is the title track of her first album (1981), and features her brother Ronnie with call and response backing vocals. The song reached number 90 on the US Billboard Hot 100 during the summer of the year. It peaked at number 11 on the R&B chart. On that chart, it ranks as the 64th biggest hit of 1981. "Very Special" has been most notably covered and/or sampled by Big Daddy Kane and Jennifer Lopez, and has been the subject of lawsuits in this regard.

== Big Daddy Kane cover ==
"Very Special"

Single by Big Daddy Kane featuring DJ Spinderella

from the album Looks Like a Job For...
- B-side: "Stop Shammin'"
- Released: June 22, 1993
- Recorded: 1993
- Genre: Hip hop
- Length: 5:05
- Label: Cold Chillin' / Reprise
- Songwriters: Antonio Hardy, Lisa Peters, William Jeffrey
- Producer: Big Daddy Kane

Big Daddy Kane singles chronology
"How U Get a Record Deal?" (1993)	"Very Special" (1993)	"In the PJs" (1994)

"Very Special" was covered by American rapper, producer and actor Big Daddy Kane featuring DJ Spinderella in 1993. It was the second single released from his fifth studio album, Looks Like a Job For... (1993). Produced by Kane, the song is a duet between Kane and Salt-n-Pepa member DJ Spinderella. The chorus was performed by vocalists Karen Anderson and Laree Williams. The song became an American Top 40 hit, becoming Big Daddy Kane's first and only single to crack the US Billboard Hot 100 chart, peaking at number 31.

== Track listing ==
=== A-side ===
1. "Very Special" (Album Version) – 5:05
2. "Very Special" (Underground Mix) – 3:03
3. "Very Special" (Edit Without Female Rap) – 3:53

=== B-side ===
1. "Stop Shammin'" (Album Version) – 3:57
2. "Stop Shammin'" (Instrumental Version) – 3:57

== Charts ==
Debra Laws version

Chart (1981)	Peak position
US Billboard Hot 100	90
US Hot Soul Singles (Billboard)	11

Big Daddy Kane version

Chart (1993)	Peak position
US Billboard Hot 100	31
US Hot R&B/Hip-Hop Singles & Tracks (Billboard)	23
US Hot Rap Singles (Billboard)	9
US Hot Dance Music/Maxi-Singles Sales (Billboard)	24
US Rhythmic Top 40 (Billboard)	6
US Cash Box Top 100	43

== Other cover versions and sampling ==
- In late 2002, Jennifer Lopez sampled "Very Special" in her international hit song, "All I Have", which reached number one in the US. This usage became the subject of a lawsuit by Laws as a result of Elektra Records giving its unilateral consent to the sampling.
- In 2013, K. Michelle sampled the song in "V.S.O.P.", which charted almost identically to Laws' original on both the pop (#89) and R&B charts (#13).
- In 2015, Crystal Kay covered the song in Japanese, featuring Sandaime J Soul Brothers' vocalist Ryuji Imaichi. From her album Shine.
