= Laws' Cause =

Studio album by Hubert Laws
- Released: 1969
- Recorded: August 10, 1966, February 9, 1968 and March 27, 1968
- Genre: Jazz
- Length: 34:18
- Label: Atlantic

Hubert Laws chronology
Flute By-Laws (1966)	Laws' Cause (1969)	Crying Song (1969)

Laws' Cause is the third album by jazz flautist Hubert Laws released on the Atlantic label in 1969.

== Reception ==
The Allmusic review by Al Campbell awarded the album 3 stars calling it "an interesting and entertaining combination of hard bop and crossover jazz". Harvey Pekar, in a contemporary review for DownBeat, wrote the album was among the best jazz flute recordings ever released and praised Laws' improvisation and soloing.

Professional ratings
Review scores
Source	Rating
Allmusic	3/5 stars
DownBeat	4/5 stars

== Track listing ==
All compositions by Hubert Laws except as indicated

1. "No More" – 2:30
2. "If You Knew" – 4:31
3. "A Day with You" (John Murtaugh) – 3:35
4. "Please Let Go" – 3:05
5. "Shades of Light" – 6:45
6. "Trio for Flute, Bassoon and Piano" (Chick Corea) – 5:09
7. "Windows" (Corea) – 8:43

- Recorded in New York City on August 10, 1966 (track 7) and at A&R Studios in New York City on February 9, 1968 (tracks 2 & 4) and March 27, 1968 (tracks 1, 3, 5 & 6)

== Personnel ==
- Hubert Laws – flute, piccolo
- Jimmy Owens – trumpet
- Karl Porter – bassoon
- Chick Corea – piano
- Roland Hanna – harpsichord
- Kenny Burrell – guitar
- Sam Brown – sitar
- Ron Carter – bass
- Chuck Rainey – electric bass
- Grady Tate – drums
- Melba Moore – vocals
