= The Laws of Jazz =

Studio album by Hubert Laws
- Released: 1964
- Recorded: April 2 & 22, 1964
- Genre: Jazz
- Length: 33:29
- Label: Atlantic
- Producer: Joel Dorn

Hubert Laws chronology
The Laws of Jazz (1964)	Flute By-Laws (1966)

The Laws of Jazz is the debut album by jazz flautist Hubert Laws released on the Atlantic label in 1964.

== Reception ==
The Allmusic review by Scott Yanow awarded the album 4 stars stating "Laws is in fine form during what is essentially a straight-ahead jazz set. Some of the music is a little funky, but throughout, Laws (who plays piccolo on two of the seven numbers) is in excellent form".

Professional ratings
Review scores
Source	Rating
Allmusic	4/5 stars
The Penguin Guide to Jazz Recordings	3/4 stars

== Track listing ==
All compositions by Hubert Laws except as indicated

1. "Miss Thing" (Bobby Thomas) - 3:47
2. "All Soul" (Curtis Lewis) - 3:39
3. "Black Eyed Peas and Rice" - 3:25
4. "Bessie's Blues" - 6:12
5. "And Don't You Forget It" (Thomas) - 2:59
6. "Bimbe Blue" - 7:51
7. "Capers" (Tommy McIntosh) - 5:36

- Recorded in New York City on April 2, 1964 (tracks 1, 3 & 6) and April 22, 1964 (tracks 2, 4, 5 & 7)

== Personnel ==
- Hubert Laws - flute, piccolo
- Armando (Chick) Corea - piano
- Richard Davis - bass
- Jimmy Cobb (tracks 2, 4, 5 & 7), Bobby Thomas (tracks 1, 3 & 6) - drums
