= Say It with Silence =

1978 studio album

Say It With Silence

Studio album by Hubert Laws
- Released: 1978
- Genre: Jazz
- Label: Columbia
- Producer: Hubert Laws, Ronnie Laws

Hubert Laws chronology
Then There Was Light, Volume 2 (1976)	Say It With Silence (1978)	Land of Passion (1979)

Say It with Silence is an album by American flute player Hubert Laws released in 1978 via Columbia Records. The album was produced by Hubert and Ronnie Laws. The album peaked at No. 5 on the US Billboard Top Jazz LPs chart.

Laws toured in support of the album, opening his set at the Berkeley Jazz Festival with "The Baron."

== Track listing ==
No.	Title	Length
1.	"The Baron"	5:51
2.	"False Faces"	6:20
3.	"Love Gets Better"	5:05
4.	"It Happens Every Day"	7:38
5.	"Say It With Silence"	8:19
