= Wild Flower (Hubert Laws album) =

Studio album by Hubert Laws
- Released: 22 July 1972
- Recorded: October 22, 1971, November 23, 1971, and January 27, 1972
- Genre: Jazz
- Length: 30:59
- Label: Atlantic
- Producer: Joel Dorn

Hubert Laws chronology
The Rite of Spring (1971)	Wild Flower (1972)	Morning Star (1972)

Wild Flower is an album by the flautist Hubert Laws released on the Atlantic label in 1972.

== Reception ==
The Allmusic review by Ron Wynn awarded the album 4½ stars calling it "A nice date from an earlier Laws period with a harder tone and more traditional jazz direction".

Professional ratings
Review scores
Source	Rating
Allmusic	4.5/5 stars

== Track listing ==
1. "Wild Flower" (John Murtaugh) - 3:14
2. "Pensativa" (Clare Fischer) - 4:05
3. "Equinox" (John Coltrane) - 6:26
4. "Ashanti" (Murtaugh) - 5:31
5. "Motherless Child" (Traditional) - 5:36
6. "Yoruba" (Murtaugh) - 6:07

- Recorded in New York City on October 22, 1971 (tracks 2 & 3), November 23, 1971 (tracks 1, 4 & 5) and January 27, 1972 (track 6)

== Personnel ==
- Hubert Laws - flute, alto flute, piccolo, electric flute
- Gary Burton - vibraphone
- Chick Corea - piano
- Ron Carter, Richard Davis - double bass
- Bernard Purdie - drums
- Ramon "Mongo" Santamaría - congas
- Joe Chambers, Airto Moreira, Warren Smith - percussion
- Bernard Eichen, Paul Gershman, Harry Lookofsky, Guy Lumia, David Nadien, Gene Orloff, John Pintavalle, Matthew Raimondi, Aaron Rosand - violin
- Julian Barber, Selwart Clarke, Harold Coletta, Richard Dickler, Harry Zaratzian - viola
- Seymour Barab, Richard Bock, Charles McCracken, George Ricci, Alan Shulman - cello
- John Murtaugh - arranger, conductor
