= Very Special (Debra Laws album) =

Studio album by Debra Laws
- Released: 1981
- Recorded: 1981
- Studios: Concorde Recording, Los Angeles
- Genres: R&B, soul
- Label: Elektra
- Producers: Hubert Laws; Ronnie Laws

Debra Laws chronology
Very Special (1981)	Moments (1993)

Singles from Very Special
- 1. "Very Special" Released: 1981; 2. "Be Yourself" Released: 1981; 3. "Meant for You" Released: 1981

Very Special is the debut album by Debra Laws, released in 1981 on Elektra Records.

The album peaked at No. 70 on the Billboard 200 and No. 13 on Billboard's Top Black Albums chart. The title track and "Be Yourself" were top 40 hits on Billboard's Hot Soul Singles chart.

== Track listing ==
Side A
No.	Title	Writer(s)	Length
1.	"On My Own"	R. Laws	4:19
2.	"Meant for You"	Lasley, Seeman	3:59
3.	"Very Special"	Peters, Jeffery	4:28
4.	"Be Yourself"	D. Laws, East	5:00

Side B
No.	Title	Writer(s)	Length
5.	"Long As We're Together"	R. Laws	4:21
6.	"Your Love"	Mitchell	3:42
7.	"How Long"	Grey, Hanks	4:02
8.	"All The Things I Love"	Lasley, Seeman	3:55

== Personnel ==
- Debra Laws – lead vocals
- Gwen Matthews – backing vocals (2, 4, 6–8)
- Marlena Jeter – backing vocals (2, 4, 6–8)
- David Lasley – backing vocals (2)
- Eloise Laws – backing vocals (5)
- Arnold McCuller – backing vocals (2)
- Alexandra Brown – backing vocals (7)
- Stephanie Hayes – backing vocals (7)
- Nathan East – bass (1–2, 4–5, 7–8)
- Alex Smith – bass (3)
- Welton Gite – bass (6)
- Leon "Ndugu" Chancler – drums (1–2, 5, 7)
- Darryl Clifton – drums (3)
- Raymond Pounds – drums (4, 6)
- Roland Bautista – guitar (except 3)
- Melvin Robinson – guitar (3)
- Arthur Adams – guitar (3, 7)
- Pat Kelley – guitar (5)
- Bobby Lyle – keyboards (except 3)
- Michael Robinson – keyboards (3)
- Larry Dunn – synthesizer (1, 4–6, 8)
- Ronnie Laws – saxophone (1, 3–4), duet vocals (3) [uncredited]
- Hubert Laws – flute (4)

Production

- Producer: Hubert Laws, Ronnie Laws
- Engineer: Gerry E. Brown
- Photography: Ron Slenzak

== Charts ==
=== Weekly charts ===
Chart (1981)	Peak position
US Billboard 200	70
US Top R&B/Hip-Hop Albums (Billboard)	13

=== Year-end charts ===
Chart (1981)	Position
US Top R&B/Hip-Hop Albums (Billboard)	26

=== Singles ===
Year	Single	Chart	Position
1981	"Very Special"	Billboard Hot 100	90
1981	"Very Special"	Billboard Hot Soul Singles	11
1981	"Be Yourself"	Billboard Hot Soul Singles	31
1981	"Meant for You"	Billboard Hot Soul Singles	47
