= The Rite of Spring (Hubert Laws album) =

Studio album by Hubert Laws
- Released: August 26, 1971
- Recorded: June 8, 10 and 25, 1971
- Studio: Van Gelder Studio, Englewood Cliffs, NJ
- Genre: Jazz
- Length: 30:29
- Label: CTI
- Producer: Creed Taylor

Hubert Laws chronology
| Afro-Classic (1970) | The Rite of Spring (1971) | Wild Flower (1972) |

The Rite of Spring is an album by flautist Hubert Laws released on the CTI label featuring jazz interpretations of classical music compositions.

== Reception ==
Professional ratings
Review scores
| Source | Rating |
|---|---|
| AllMusic | 2.5/5 stars |
| The Penguin Guide to Jazz Recordings | 2.5/4 stars |

The AllMusic review by Thom Jurek awarded the album 2½ stars stating "Long before Wynton decided he could play classical chops as well as the real long-haired interpreters, even though he was a jazz musician, Hubert Laws and his partners at CTI gave it a run with a jazz twist, and for the most part with a far more adventurous repertoire. Unfortunately, the results were just about as thrilling as Wynton's, with a few notable exceptions.

== Track listing ==
1. "Pavane" (Gabriel Fauré) - 7:43
2. "The Rite of Spring" (Igor Stravinsky) - 9:03
3. "Syrinx" (Claude Debussy) - 3:34
4. "Brandenburg Concerto #3 (First Movement)" (Johann Sebastian Bach) - 6:01
5. "Brandenburg Concerto #3 (Second Movement)" (Bach) - 4:27

== Personnel ==
- Hubert Laws - flute
- Wally Kane, Jane Taylor - bassoon
- Bob James - piano, electric piano, electric harpsichord
- Gene Bertoncini, Stuart Scharf - guitar
- Ron Carter - bass
- Jack DeJohnette - drums
- Dave Friedman - vibraphone, percussion
- Airto Moreira - percussion
- Don Sebesky - arranger, conductor
