= 5-10-15-20 (25-30 Years of Love) =

Single by The Presidents

from the album 5-10-15-20 (25-30 Years of Love)
- B-side: "I'm Still Dancing"
- Released: September 1970
- Genre: Soul, R&B
- Length: 3:00
- Label: Sussex Records
- Songwriters: Tony Boyd, Archie Powell
- Producer: Van McCoy

The Presidents singles chronology
"5-10-15-20 (25-30 Years of Love)" (1970)	"Triangle of Love (Hey Diddle Diddle)" (1971)

"5-10-15-20 (25-30 Years of Love)" is a 1970 song by The Presidents. It is the title track and first release from their album. The song was produced by Van McCoy. It reached number 11 on the US Billboard Hot 100, number 5 on the R&B chart and was nominated for a Grammy Award for Best R&B Performance by a Duo or Group with Vocals.

== Chart performance ==
=== Weekly charts ===
Chart (1970–71)	Peak position
Canadian RPM Top Singles	43
US Billboard Hot 100	11
US Billboard R&B	5
US Cash Box Top 100	7
