= Fighting Back (1982 American film) =

1982 film by Lewis Teague

- Theatrical release poster
- Directed by: Lewis Teague
- Screenplay by: Thomas Hedley Jr. David Zelag Goodman
- Produced by: D. Constantine Conte executive Dino de Laurentiis
- Starring: Tom Skerritt; Patti LuPone; Michael Sarrazin; Yaphet Kotto
- Cinematography: Franco Di Giacomo
- Edited by: Nicholas C. Smith
- Music by: Piero Piccioni
- Production company: Paramount Famous Productions
- Distributed by: Paramount Pictures
- Release date: May 21, 1982
- Running time: 96 minutes
- Country: United States
- Language: English
- Budget: $9 million
- Box office: $6.4 million (rentals)

Fighting Back (UK title: Death Vengeance) is a 1982 vigilante crime action drama thriller film written by Thomas Hedley Jr and David Zelag Goodman and directed by Lewis Teague. The film stars Tom Skerritt, Patti LuPone, Michael Sarrazin, Yaphet Kotto, David Rasche, Lewis Van Bergen, Earle Hyman, and Ted Ross.

== Plot ==
The film opens with Philadelphia television reporters viewing and broadcasting a news story about violence in society since JFK's assassination in 1963. With the increase in crime, Philadelphia is becoming unsafe. Proud Italian-American, John D'Angelo, runs a deli in town. While driving with his wife, Lisa, John comes across a pimp known as Eldorado, brutalizing one of his prostitutes. John's wife confronts the pimp, who chases the D'Angelos and rams his car into the back of the D'Angelos' vehicle, injuring Lisa and killing their unborn baby. Later, John's mother, Vera, is assaulted in the neighborhood by robbers who tried to take her wedding ring.

John decides to make a stand, organizing a neighborhood patrol of regular citizens who are also fed up with the crime in their neighborhood. They call themselves The People's Neighborhood Patrol (PNP). They have their own uniforms of blue hats and vests that have a PNP logo on them, headquarters to take phone calls, and vehicles containing the PNP logo and led by John and his best friend Vince Morelli, a police officer. After D'Angelo's house is burglarized and their dog is killed, the film cuts to the reporters' studio footage of Anthony Imperiale ten years after the 1967 Newark riots, self-defense classes in Beverly Hills, various target practice sessions and the Guardian Angels on patrol in New York City. With Vince's help, the police allow the PNP to patrol the neighborhood. However, the PNP seems to operate with no regard for the law and does what it wants. To make their first stand and to introduce themselves to the neighborhood, the group goes to a dirty bar in town known for being a hot spot for criminals, including Eldorado and his men. John casually walks into the bar with the rest of the PNP behind him. John confronts the bartender (Allan Graf) to try to get answers as to who is responsible for mugging his mother. Things turn violent when the bartender laughs in John's face, triggering an all-out brawl, but the PNP comes out on top.

John and the PNP start gaining media attention, and the neighborhood starts to rally behind the PNP. The group starts taking out various street criminals. The PNP operates above the law. John does what he wants, and his actions are seen as racial discrimination by a small portion of the African-American community. John meets with Ivanhoe Washington, a black leader of a similar vigilante movement. Ivanhoe presents John with the two men who mugged his mother, one of whom is white while the other is black. John beats up the black man, proving Ivanhoe's point that John is guilty of discrimination.

With widespread media attention, John decides to run for councilman in the upcoming election. Just when things are looking good for the city, tragedy strikes when Vince is gunned down and killed at the hands of Eldorado and his men. In retaliation, John organizes a large-scale attack on the park where Vince was killed. All members of the PNP head to the park, where they demand for everyone in the park to clear out. When their demands are ignored, the PNP takes action and starts to clear out the park by brute force. A large brawl soon erupts, and police arrive on the scene not long afterward. John spots Eldorado and chases after him; during the chase, John is tackled and arrested by police. Eldorado manages to get away.

Meeting with the Police Commissioner, John is informed where Eldorado is, the Commissioner sardonically explaining that John can understand that at the moment the police are "too busy" to arrest Eldorado and in effect inviting John to assassinate Eldorado. When John explains he does not know how to thank him, the Commissioner says "oh yes, he does" and explains that his job is based on working with people and paying and collecting favors and that John is going to owe him some big favors when he is elected.

Essentially having permission from the Commissioner to take out Eldorado, John waits patiently on the roof above Eldorado's vehicle. When Eldorado and his men enter the car, John drops a grenade through the vehicle's roof. The grenade explodes, killing everyone inside the car.

John ends up winning the election, and a large celebration with family and friends takes place inside his deli. The PNP has cleaned up the neighborhood, and crime is no more. The final scene shows children playing in the same park that was once occupied by criminals.

== Cast ==
- Tom Skerritt as John D'Angelo
- Patti LuPone as Lisa D'Angelo
- Michael Sarrazin as Vince Morelli
- Yaphet Kotto as Ivanhoe Washington
- David Rasche as Michael Taylor
- Lewis Van Bergen as Laz Burkofsky
- Earle Hyman as Police Officer
- Ted Ross as Police Commissioner
- Frank Sivero as Frank Russo
- Pat Cooper as Harry Janelli
- Paul Rawson as Jim
- Gina DeAngelis as Vera D'Angelo
- Allan Graf as Carl-The Bartender
- Donna de Varona as Sara Rogers
- Jonathan Adam Sherman as Danny D'Angelo
- Pete Richardson as Eldorado
- Joseph Rangno as Mike Pelyk
- Sal Richards as Bill Gallo
- Jim Moody as Lester Baldwin
- Maurie Fields as Police Sergeant

== Production ==
The film was rumored to be based on the story of Anthony Imperiale, a former city councilman in Newark, New Jersey, who organised a vigilante group. The producer, Dino De Laurentiis, had enjoyed a big box office success with an earlier vigilante movie, Death Wish. He developed the film with one director but two weeks before filming started replaced him with Lewis Teague.

Teague wanted to make a film about a "flawed hero: I’d always imagined a Raging Bull type of story, with this fascinating villain as the main character.’ However De Laurentiis pushed for scenes showing the lead to be heroic, so Teague said, "the picture’s a little schizophrenic in its point of view — you don’t know whether to like the guy or detest the guy."

Fighting Back was mostly filmed in and around the Kensington section of Philadelphia, Pennsylvania over seven weeks starting in November 1981. It was known during filming as The Last Safe Place and then Striking Back. In February 1982 it was announced Paramount had acquired the film.

Patti Lupone later said "I don't know what to say about the experience except that I respected my costars and my director, I had a lot of fun making it and I play a harried Italian housewife."

== Reception ==
Opening the weekend of May 23, 1982, Fighting Back grossed $1,624,381 at the US box office. The film went on to gross $3,355,948 in the United States and Canada. Worldwide, it earned theatrical rentals of $6.4 million.

=== Critical response ===
Review aggregator Rotten Tomatoes gives Fighting Back a score of 20% based on reviews from 5 critics and a rating average of 4.5 out of 10.

Richard F. Shepard of The New York Times wrote in his review: "This Dino De Laurentiis production is, puzzlingly, more realistic in its parts than in its whole, which tries to attack the entire problem of crime and neighborhood self-protection, of selfless community service and of temptations to use service as a stepping stone. It approaches and touches the matters of racism, political opportunism, civil rights, vigilante tactics and the process of law, but it does not come to extreme conclusions about them. And so we are left with a story, but fortunately the story is interestingly spun. Fighting Back is set in an Italian neighborhood of Philadelphia, where a storekeeper, played by Tom Skerritt, is outraged by an incident on the streets that results in his pregnant wife losing the baby and by a robbery in which his mother's ring finger is cut off. He organizes the local people into a security patrol. The patrol does wipe out crime but operates beyond the law, with our hero carrying on more of a personal vendetta, western-style, than a campaign to establish law and order."

Critic Gary Arnold of The Washington Post wrote in his review: "Fighting Back is a lurid glorification of urban vigilantism remotely inspired by the career of Anthony Imperiale, the charismatic community leader of riled and fearful Italian-American residents in Newark in the late 1960s. Imperiale himself is recalled in newsreel clips in the course of the movie, which opens for no justifiable reason with a medley of traumatic documentary footage, from the assassination of President Kennedy through the assassination attempts on President Reagan and Pope John Paul II.... All of them are impressively overqualified for the minimal, motley quality of illusion that Fighting Back is content to confuse with effective contemporary melodrama."

== Release ==
Fighting Back was released in theatres on May 21, 1982. The film was released on VHS in the United Kingdom.
