= Hubert Laws =

American flutist and saxophonist

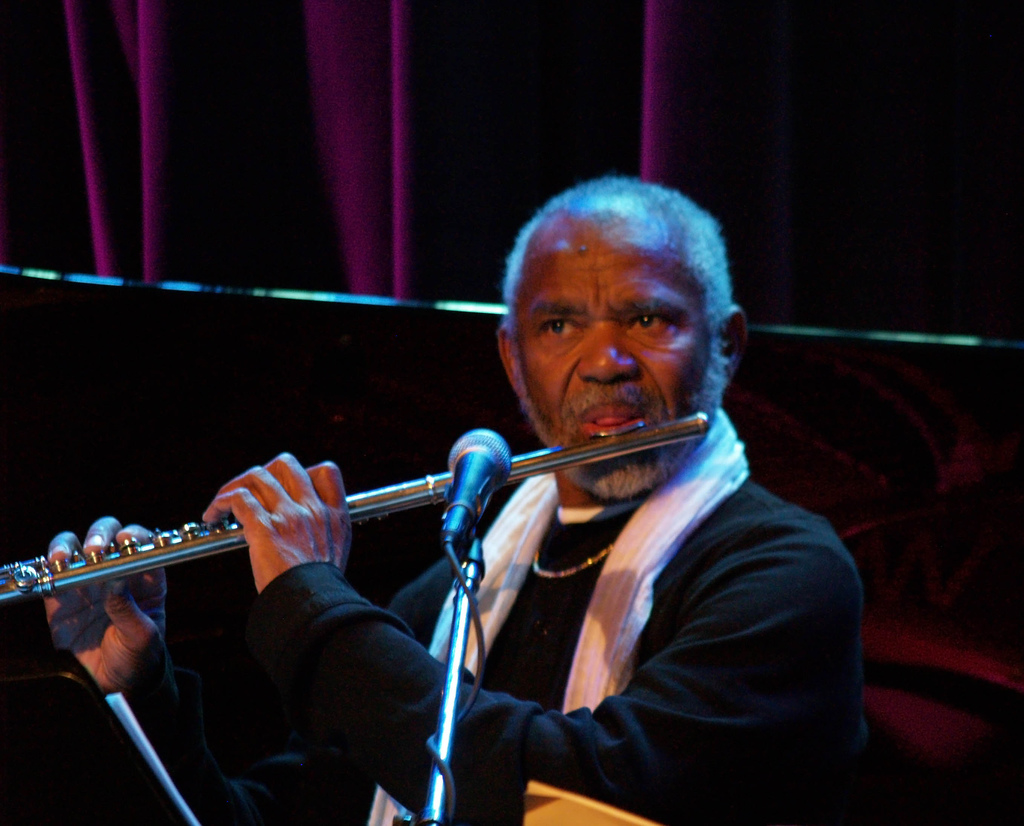
- Laws in 2007

Background information
- Born: November 10, 1939 (age 86)
- Origin: Houston, Texas, United States
- Genres: Jazz, classical
- Occupation: Musician
- Instruments: Flute, piccolo
- Years active: 1964–present
- Labels: RKO/Unique, Sony, Music Masters Jazz, CTI, Columbia
- Website: HubertLaws.com

Hubert Laws (born November 10, 1939) is an American flutist, piccoloist and saxophonist with a career spanning over 50 years in jazz, classical, and other music genres. Laws is one of the few classical artists who has also mastered jazz, pop, and rhythm-and-blues genres, moving effortlessly from one repertory to another. He has three Grammy nominations.

== Biography ==
Hubert Laws Jr. was born November 10, 1939, in the Studewood section of Houston, Texas, the second of eight children to Hubert Laws Sr. and Miola Luverta Donahue. Many of his siblings also entered the music industry, including saxophonist Ronnie and vocalists Eloise, Debra, and Johnnie Laws. He began playing flute in high school after volunteering to substitute for the school orchestra's regular flutist. He became adept at jazz improvisation by playing in the Houston-area jazz group the Swingsters, which eventually evolved into the Modern Jazz Sextet, the Night Hawks, and The Crusaders. At the age of 15, he was a member of the early Jazz Crusaders while in Texas (1954–60), and also played classical music during those years.

Winning a scholarship to New York's Juilliard School of Music in 1960, he studied music both in the classroom and with master flutist Julius Baker, and played with both the New York Metropolitan Opera Orchestra (member) and the New York Philharmonic Orchestra through 1969–72. In this period, his renditions of classical compositions by Gabriel Fauré, Stravinsky, Debussy, and Bach on the 1971 CTI recording Rite of Spring—with a string section and such jazz stalwarts as Airto Moreira, Jack DeJohnette, Bob James, and Ron Carter—earned him an audience of classical music aficionados. Laws would return to this genre in 1976 with a recording of Tchaikovsky's Romeo and Juliet.

While at Juilliard, Laws played flute during the evenings with several acts, including Mongo Santamaría through 1963–67 where he also was featured on tenor saxophone, and in 1964 began recording as a bandleader for Atlantic where he released the albums The Laws of Jazz, Flute By-Laws, and Laws Cause. He appeared on albums by Ashford & Simpson, Chet Baker, George Benson, and Moondog. He recorded with his younger brother Ronnie on the album The Laws in the early 1970s. He played flute on Gil Scott-Heron's 1971 album Pieces of a Man, which featured the jazz poem "The Revolution Will Not Be Televised". During the 1970s, Laws was a member of the New York Jazz Quartet. He can also be heard playing tenor saxophone on some records from the 1970s.

In 1981, Laws produced the album Very Special by Debra Laws.

In the 1990s, Laws resumed his career, playing on the 1991 Spirituals in Concert recording by opera singers Kathleen Battle and Jessye Norman. His albums on the Music Masters Jazz label—My Time Will Come in 1990 and, more particularly, Storm Then Calm in 1994—are regarded by critics as a return to the form he exhibited on his early 1970s albums. He also recorded a tribute album to jazz pianist and pop-music vocalist Nat King Cole, Hubert Laws Remembers the Unforgettable Nat King Cole, which received critical accolades. Among the many artists he has played and recorded with are Herbie Hancock, Chick Corea, McCoy Tyner, Nancy Wilson, Quincy Jones, Paul McCartney, Paul Simon, Aretha Franklin, Ella Fitzgerald, Sarah Vaughan, Lena Horne, Leonard Bernstein, Antonio Carlos Jobim, James Moody, Jaco Pastorius, Sérgio Mendes, Steve Barta, Bob James, Carly Simon, Grant Green, George Benson, Freddie Hubbard, Clark Terry, Stevie Wonder, J. J. Johnson, and The Rascals. In 1998, Laws recorded with Morcheeba for the Red Hot Organization's compilation album Red Hot + Rhapsody, a tribute to George Gershwin, which raised money for various charities devoted to increasing AIDS awareness and fighting the disease.

The 2006 video Hubert Laws Live 30-year Video Retrospective includes "Red Hot & Cool" with Nancy Wilson, Performance in Brazil, The Tonight Show Starring Johnny Carson Appearance, The 1975 Down Beat Reader's Poll Awards, Performance in Japan, and Performance in Germany.

== Awards and honors ==
In June 2010, Laws received a lifetime achievement award from the National Endowment for the Arts in the field of jazz.

Laws is a recipient of the 2011 NEA Jazz Masters Award.

=== Grammy Awards ===
Hubert Laws has received the following nominations at the Grammy Awards:

Year	Title	Category	Result
1973	Morning Star	Best Jazz Performance by a Soloist	Nominated
1974	In the Beginning	Best Jazz Performance by a Soloist	Nominated
1979	Land of Passion	Best R&B Instrumental Performance	Nominated

== Discography ==
- The Laws of Jazz (1964)
- Flute By-Laws (1966)
- Laws' Cause (1969)
- Crying Song (1969)
- Afro-Classic (1970)
- The Rite of Spring (1971)
- Wild Flower (1972)
- Morning Star (1972)
- Carnegie Hall (1973)
- In the Beginning (1974)
- The Chicago Theme (1975)
- The San Francisco Concert (1975)
- Romeo & Juliet (1976)
- Say It with Silence (1978)
- Land of Passion (1979)
- Studio Trieste (1982)
- My Time Will Come (1993)
