= The Presidents (American soul band) =

American soul group

- Origin: Washington, D.C, United States
- Genres: Soul
- Labels: Sussex, A&M
- Past members: Tony Boyd; Archie Powell; Billy Shorter

The Presidents were an American soul group from Washington, D.C. The group's members were Tony Boyd, Archie Powell, and Billy Shorter. The group scored a hit in the United States in 1970 with the Van McCoy produced track, "5-10-15-20 (25-30 Years of Love)", taken from the Sussex Records album of the same name. The album hit #158 on the Billboard Hot 200 and #15 on the R&B Albums chart, and the song peaked at #11 on the Billboard Hot 100 pop singles chart, #5 on the R&B singles chart, and #43 in Canada.

Later in the 1970s, the group changed its name to Trilogy, then Anacostia, under which they recorded the similar-sounding single "On and Off" (later recorded by David Ruffin) and continued recording under this name into the 1980s.
