= Eloise Laws =

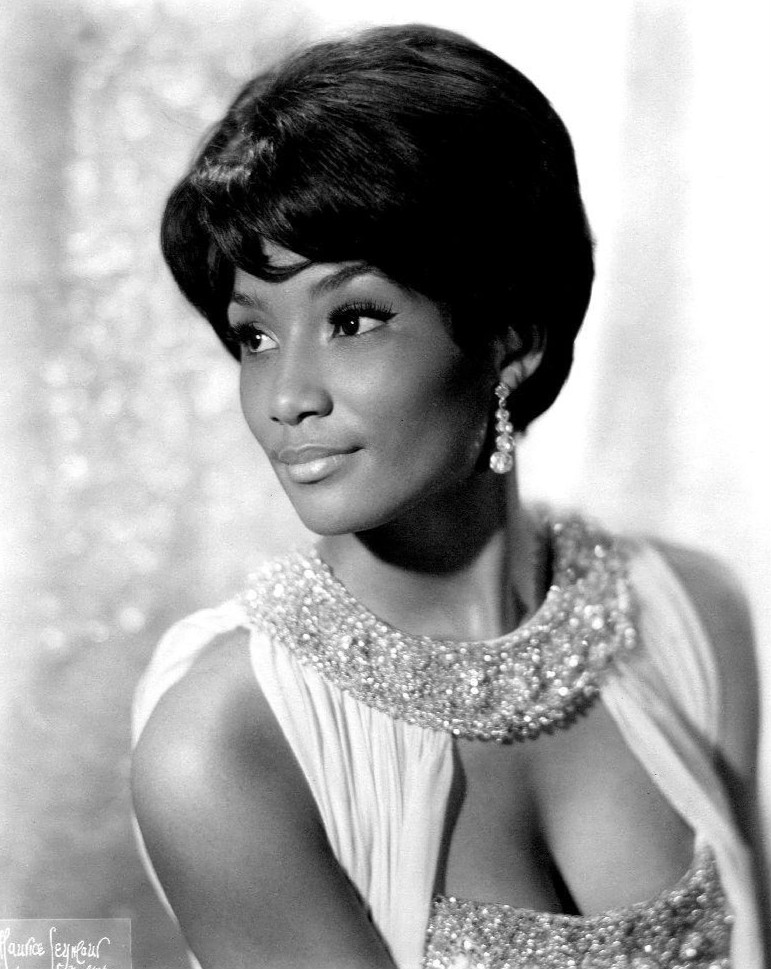
- Laws in 1968

Background information
- Born: Lavern Eloise Laws; November 6, 1943 (age 82); Houston, Texas, U.S.
- Genres: Jazz, R&B
- Occupation: Vocalist
- Labels: Invictus, ABC, Capitol

Eloise Laws (born November 6, 1943) is an American singer and a member of the Laws family of musicians from Houston, Texas.

== Biography ==
Lavern Eloise Laws was born in Houston, Texas, as the fourth of eight children of Miola Luverta Donahue and Hubert Laws, Sr. Born into a family of musicians, her siblings include flutist Hubert, saxophonist Ronnie, and vocalist Debra.

In the 1970s, she was the first replacement for singer Marilyn McCoo in The 5th Dimension. She then began recording for Holland-Dozier-Holland's Music Merchant and later Invictus labels. Her first album, Ain't It Good Feeling Good, was released on Invictus in 1977. Unfortunately, both labels folded. Laws released the LP Eloise (ABC) later the same year and Eloise Laws (Liberty) in 1980, both of which featured the songwriting and producing talents of Linda Creed.

Eloise has been credited as one of the backing singers on her brother Ronnie's 1980 LP Every Generation.

After All in Time, for Capitol, followed two years later, Laws was featured on albums from such artists as Harvey Mason, Lee Oskar, Aquarian Dream, Ahmad Jamal as well as several releases by her siblings. She did not record another solo album until the late 1990s. Meanwhile, she pursued a career on stage, starring in the Tony-nominated musical, It Ain't Nothin' But the Blues, which she also co-wrote.

== Discography ==
=== Studio albums ===
- 1977: Ain't It Good Feeling Good (Invictus Records)
- 1977: Eloise (ABC)
- 1980: Eloise Laws (Liberty)
- 1982: All in Time (Capitol)
- 2000: The Key (Scepterstein)
- 2003: Secrets (Scepterstein)

=== Compilations ===
- 1999: Love Factory: The Invictus Sessions (Castle)
