= Debra Laws =

American singer-songwriter

- Laws in 1981

Background information
- Born: Debra Renee Laws; September 10, 1956 (age 70); Houston, Texas, U.S.
- Genres: R&B, quiet storm
- Occupation: Vocalist
- Years active: 1977–present
- Label: Elektra

Debra Renee Laws (born September 10, 1956) is an American singer and actress from Houston, Texas. She is best known for her 1981 R&B/soul ballad "Very Special". In her music career, she works closely with her siblings, Eloise Laws, Hubert Laws and Ronnie Laws, who are producers.

== Biography ==
Born in Houston, Texas, Laws is the seventh of eight children to Hubert Laws Sr. and Miola Luverta Donahue. She has performed throughout the US in such prestigious venues as Carnegie Hall, The Berkeley Jazz Festival and the Hollywood Bowl. She has also toured in Europe, Africa, and Asia. Her 1993 album is entitled Moments, and she produced, wrote or co-wrote nine of the 12 songs contained in the album.

== Career ==
Her professional career started in 1977 when she was featured on her brother Ronnie's album entitled Friends and Strangers, on United Artists Records. In 1979, she was a lead vocalist on her brother Hubert's album, Land of Passion, on Columbia Records.

Laws made her debut as a solo recording artist in 1981 with the release of her album Very Special on Elektra Records. This album, produced by her two brothers sold in excess of 385,000 copies, while the two singles, "Very Special" and "Be Yourself" sold combined totals in excess of 260,000 copies. The third single, "Meant for You", was written by Roxanne Seeman and David Lasley. "Meant for You" appeared in the Paramount film Fighting Back featuring Tom Skerritt and Patti LuPone.

From 1981 through 1990, Laws worked with her three siblings, recording and doing many live performances in the United States and abroad.

In 1985, she recorded "Crusin' Tonight," written and produced by George Duke, for The Heavenly Kid motion picture soundtrack. In June 1987, she won the first prize in the international TV singing competition Midnight Sun Song Festival in Lahti, Finland.

In April and May 1991, she toured Europe with the Commodores for a 38 city tour. In November of that year, she performed with Kool and the Gang, Third World, Shabba Ranks, Rita Marley, the Commodores and many others at a benefit for the children of Africa held in Lagos, Nigeria. In 1992, she toured Asia in January and February, performing in Thailand, Singapore, Taiwan and Japan. Rapper Big Daddy Kane covered "Very Special" in 1993. Mary J. Blige and Jennifer Lopez sampled "Very Special" also.

She then began the writing and recording process for an album which was completed in October 1994. In November and December of that year, she toured Europe again. She worked with Jeffrey Ozbourne, Betty Wright, and Stevie Wonder.

In addition to The Heavenly Kid, she has also recorded soundtracks for Fighting Back and Prison Dancer and is featured on Pamela Williams' album Eight Days of Ecstasy.

== Lawsuits against Sony Music and Elektra Entertainment Group ==
In March 2003, Debra Laws sued Sony Music Entertainment/Epic Records in the United States District Court for the Central District of California, over the use of samples from "Very Special" in Jennifer Lopez's recording of "All I Have" on her album This Is Me... Then. Although Sony had been granted permission to use the samples by Elektra Entertainment Group, which held the copyright to the song, Laws claimed that the use of her voice without her consent nonetheless violated her statutory and common law right of publicity under California law. In November 2003, Judge Lourdes Baird granted Sony Music's motion for summary judgment on the ground that Laws's state law claims were preempted by Section 301 of the United States Copyright Act. In 2006, that decision was affirmed by the United States Court of Appeals for the Ninth Circuit.

In 2004, after losing the lawsuit against Sony Music, Laws and her production company, Spirit Productions, Inc. (which is owned and controlled by her brother, Hubert), sued Elektra Entertainment Group (as well as Elektra's parent company, Warner Music Group, and former parent, Warner Communications, Inc.), claiming that Elektra was contractually obligated to obtain consent before agreeing to allow the "Very Special" sound recording to be used in "All I Have." Laws's claims were dismissed early in the case on res judicata grounds, and Spirit's claims settled in early 2007 on undisclosed terms.

== Discography ==
=== Albums ===
Year	Album	Chart positions	
Year	Album	US	US R&B
1981	Very Special	70	13
1993	Moments	—	—
"—" denotes releases that failed to chart

=== Singles ===
Year	Title	Chart positions	
Year	Title	US	US R&B
1980	"Be Yourself"	—	31
1981	"Very Special"	90	11
1981	"On My Own"	—	—
1981	"Meant for You"	—	47
"—" denotes releases that failed to chart or was not released.

== Acting career ==
Theater

- It Ain't Nothin' But the Blues(1999)
- Clothes Pins and Dreams Suds
- The Choice Is Yours
- The World Is a Playground and a Great Big Circus

Film

- Crossroads(1986)
- Jailbird Rock
